= 2020 Dawn Ultra 150 =

Race details
- Race 8 of 20 of the 2020 ARCA Menards Series
- Date: July 24, 2020
- Official name: Inaugural Dawn Ultra 150
- Location: Kansas City, Kansas, Kansas Speedway
- Course: Permanent racing facility
- Course length: 2.41 km (1.5 miles)
- Distance: 100 laps, 150 mi (241.402 km)
- Scheduled distance: 100 laps, 150 mi (241.402 km)
- Average speed: 138.533 miles per hour (222.947 km/h)

Pole position
Driver	Riley Herbst	Joe Gibbs Racing
- Time: Set by 2020 owner's points

Most laps led
Driver	Bret Holmes	Bret Holmes Racing
- Laps: 82

Winner
No. 23	Bret Holmes	Bret Holmes Racing

Television in the United States
- Network: Fox Sports 1
- Announcers: David Rieff, Phil Parsons

Radio in the United States
- Radio: Motor Racing Network

The 2020 Dawn Ultra 150 was the eighth stock car race of the 2020 ARCA Menards Series and the inaugural iteration of the event. The race was held on Friday, July 24, 2020, in Kansas City, Kansas at Kansas Speedway, a 1.5 miles (2.4 km) permanent D-shaped oval racetrack. The race took the scheduled 100 laps to complete. At race's end, Bret Holmes of Bret Holmes Racing would dominate to win his first and so far final career ARCA Menards Series win and his first and only win of the season. To fill out the podium, Ryan Repko of Venturini Motorsports and Riley Herbst of Joe Gibbs Racing would finish second and third, respectively.

== Background ==
Kansas Speedway is a 1.5-mile (2.4 km) tri-oval race track in Kansas City, Kansas. It was built in 2001 and hosts two annual NASCAR race weekends. The NTT IndyCar Series also raced there until 2011. The speedway is owned and operated by the International Speedway Corporation.

=== Entry list ===
#	Driver	Team	Make	Sponsor
01	Mike Basham	Fast Track Racing	Chevrolet	Fast Track Racing
4	Hailie Deegan	DGR-Crosley	Ford	Monster Energy
06	Con Nicolopoulos	Wayne Peterson Racing	Chevrolet	Great Railing
8	Russ Lane	Empire Records	Toyota	NASA Central Region, Make It Rain
10	Ryan Huff	Fast Track Racing	Ford	Shawn Balluzzo Tribute
11	Tyler Hill	Fast Track Racing	Chevrolet	Fast Track Racing
12	Corey Heim	Fast Track Racing	Toyota	JBL
15	Drew Dollar	Venturini Motorsports	Toyota	Sunbelt Rentals
17	Tanner Gray	DGR-Crosley	Ford	Pneumatech
18	Riley Herbst	Joe Gibbs Racing	Toyota	Monster Energy
20	Ryan Repko	Venturini Motorsports	Toyota	Craftsman
22	Derek Griffith	Chad Bryant Racing	Ford	Original Gourmet Lollipops
23	Bret Holmes	Bret Holmes Racing	Chevrolet	Holmes II Excavating
25	Michael Self	Venturini Motorsports	Toyota	Sinclair
46	Thad Moffitt	DGR-Crosley	Ford	Performance Plus Motor Oil Richard Petty Signature Series
48	Brad Smith	Brad Smith Motorsports	Chevrolet	Home Building Solutions, NASCAR Low Teams
69	Eric Caudell	Kimmel Racing	Toyota	ETRM Software Consulting, Caudell Sports Marketing
97	Jason Kitzmiller	CR7 Motorsports	Chevrolet	A. L. L. Construction
Official entry list

== Practice ==
The only one-hour practice session would occur on Friday, July 24. Bret Holmes of Bret Holmes Racing would set the fastest time in the session, with a lap of 31.669 and an average speed of 170.514 miles per hour (274.416 km/h).

Pos.	#	Driver	Team	Make	Time	Speed
1	23	Bret Holmes	Bret Holmes Racing	Chevrolet	31.669	170.514
2	18	Riley Herbst	Joe Gibbs Racing	Toyota	31.910	169.226
3	20	Ryan Repko	Venturini Motorsports	Toyota	32.059	168.439
Full practice results

== Starting lineup ==
ARCA would not hold a qualifying session for the race. Therefore, the current 2020 owner's standings would be determined for who got the pole. As a result, Riley Herbst of Joe Gibbs Racing won the pole.

Pos.	#	Driver	Team	Make
1	18	Riley Herbst	Joe Gibbs Racing	Toyota
2	25	Michael Self	Venturini Motorsports	Toyota
3	20	Ryan Repko	Venturini Motorsports	Toyota
4	23	Bret Holmes	Bret Holmes Racing	Chevrolet
5	15	Drew Dollar	Venturini Motorsports	Toyota
6	4	Hailie Deegan	DGR-Crosley	Ford
7	17	Tanner Gray	DGR-Crosley	Ford
8	46	Thad Moffitt	DGR-Crosley	Ford
9	69	Eric Caudell	Kimmel Racing	Toyota
10	12	Corey Heim	Fast Track Racing	Toyota
11	10	Ryan Huff	Fast Track Racing	Ford
12	22	Derek Griffith	Chad Bryant Racing	Ford
13	11	Tyler Hill	Fast Track Racing	Chevrolet
14	06	Con Nicolopoulos	Wayne Peterson Racing	Chevrolet
15	48	Brad Smith	Brad Smith Motorsports	Chevrolet
16	97	Jason Kitzmiller	CR7 Motorsports	Chevrolet
17	01	Mike Basham	Fast Track Racing	Chevrolet
18	8	Russ Lane	Empire Records	Toyota
Official starting lineup

== Race results ==
Fin	St	#	Driver	Team	Make	Laps	Led	Status	Pts
1	4	23	Bret Holmes	Bret Holmes Racing	Chevrolet	100	82	running	48
2	3	20	Ryan Repko	Venturini Motorsports	Toyota	100	0	running	42
3	1	18	Riley Herbst	Joe Gibbs Racing	Toyota	100	18	running	42
4	10	12	Corey Heim	Fast Track Racing	Toyota	100	0	running	40
5	7	17	Tanner Gray	DGR-Crosley	Ford	100	0	running	39
6	2	25	Michael Self	Venturini Motorsports	Toyota	100	0	running	38
7	5	15	Drew Dollar	Venturini Motorsports	Toyota	100	0	running	37
8	12	22	Derek Griffith	Chad Bryant Racing	Ford	100	0	running	36
9	6	4	Hailie Deegan	DGR-Crosley	Ford	100	0	running	35
10	8	46	Thad Moffitt	DGR-Crosley	Ford	99	0	running	34
11	16	97	Jason Kitzmiller	CR7 Motorsports	Chevrolet	97	0	running	33
12	9	69	Eric Caudell	Kimmel Racing	Toyota	95	0	running	32
13	11	10	Ryan Huff	Fast Track Racing	Ford	93	0	overheating	31
14	13	11	Tyler Hill	Fast Track Racing	Chevrolet	93	0	running	30
15	14	06	Con Nicolopoulos	Wayne Peterson Racing	Chevrolet	67	0	engine	29
16	15	48	Brad Smith	Brad Smith Motorsports	Chevrolet	33	0	handling	28
17	17	01	Mike Basham	Fast Track Racing	Chevrolet	19	0	vibration	27
18	18	8	Russ Lane	Empire Records	Toyota	14	0	crash	26
Official race results

Previous race: 2020 Shore Lunch 150	ARCA Menards Series; 2020 season	Next race: 2020 Menards.com 200 Presented by SPxE
