= Jason Kitzmiller =

American racing driver (born 1973)

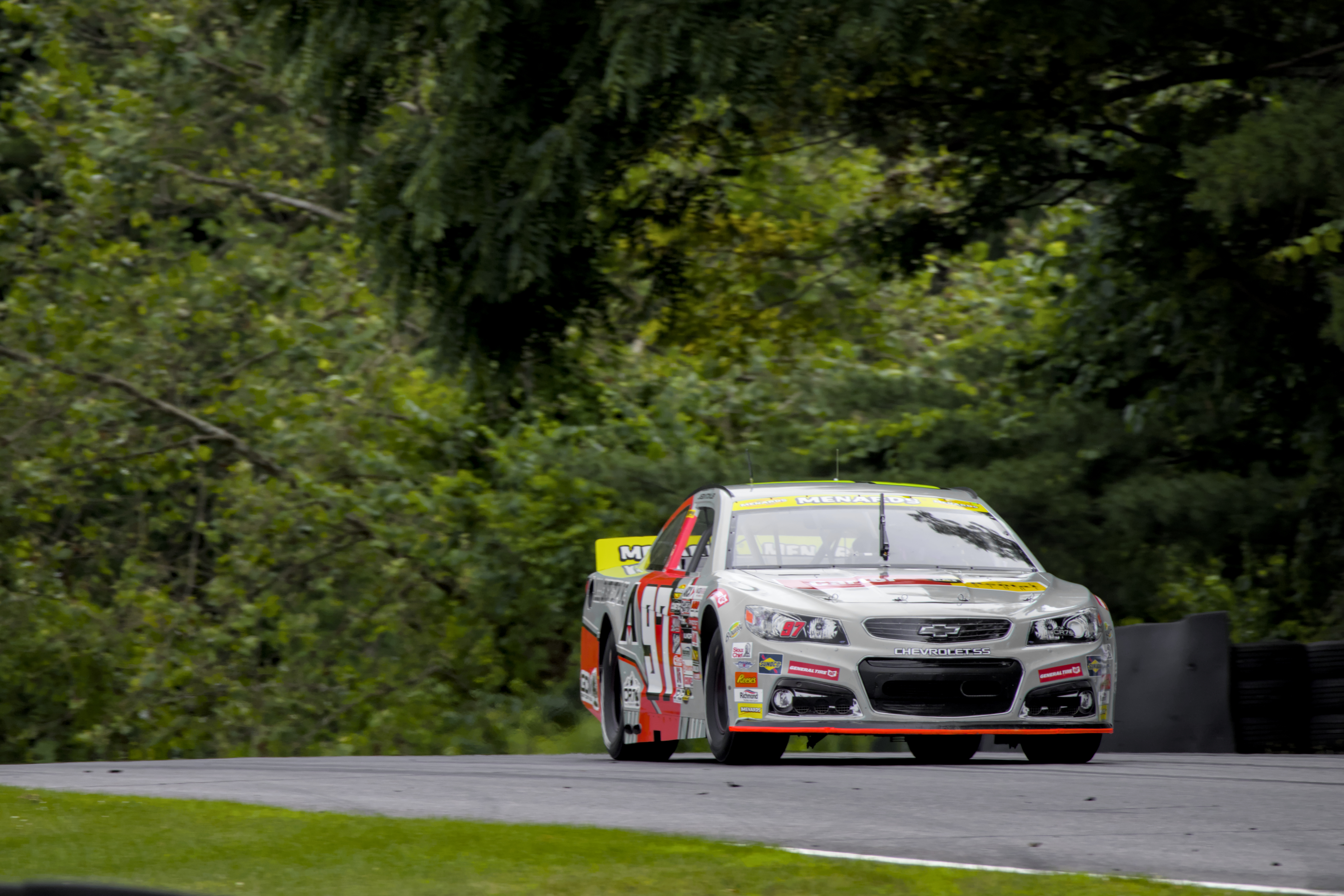
- Kitzmiller's No. 97 car at Lime Rock Park in 2025
- Born: Jason Andrew Kitzmiller; July 25, 1973 (age 53); Petersburg, West Virginia, U.S.

NASCAR FedEx Freight Truck Series career
- 1 race run over 1 year
- 2026 position: 83rd
- Best finish: 83rd (2026)
- First race: 2026 Fresh From Florida 250 (Daytona)
Wins	Top tens	Poles
0	0	0

ARCA Menards Series career
- 66 races run over 7 years
- ARCA no., team: No. 97 (CR7 Motorsports)
- Best finish: 3rd (2025)
- First race: 2020 Lucas Oil 200 (Daytona)
- Last race: 2026 Menards 150 (Kansas)
Wins	Top tens	Poles
0	33	0

ARCA Menards Series East career
- 10 races run over 4 years
- ARCA East no., team: No. 97 (CR7 Motorsports)
- Best finish: 10th (2025)
- First race: 2020 Bush's Beans 200 (Bristol)
- Last race: 2026 Bush's Best 200 (Bristol)
Wins	Top tens	Poles
0	5	0

ARCA Menards Series West career
- 2 races run over 2 years
- ARCA West no., team: No. 97 (CR7 Motorsports)
- Best finish: 68th (2026)
- First race: 2025 General Tire 150 (Phoenix)
- Last race: 2026 General Tire 150 (Phoenix)
Wins	Top tens	Poles
0	0	0
- Statistics up to date as of November 6, 2026.

Jason Andrew Kitzmiller (born July 25, 1973) is an American professional stock car racing driver. He competes full-time in the ARCA Menards Series, driving the No. 97 Chevrolet SS for CR7 Motorsports. He also competes part-time in the Grand National Super Series Presented By ECC, where he has captured multiple victories. He is the father of fellow racing driver Isaac Kitzmiller, who is the 2025 ARCA Menards Series East champion.

== Racing career ==
=== ARCA Menards Series ===
Kitzmiller would announce his debut in the ARCA Menards Series in 2020, driving the No. 97 Chevrolet for CR7 Motorsports in a press release, saying "Without a doubt, this will be the biggest race of my career thus far and I've got a ton of knowledge and support behind me, I just hope to mind my manners and keep our No. 97 CR7 Motorsports Chevrolet out of trouble." He would finish 32nd with engine troubles. Throughout the season, he would make six more starts with CR7 Motorsports, earning two top-tens that year at Talladega and Michigan. He would end up finishing eighteenth in the standings with 212 points.

In 2021, Kitzmiller would return to the series, again with CR7 Motorsports as a part-timer. In six races, he would not get any top-tens, with a best of eleventh at Daytona and Charlotte. He would have a worse season in 2021, finishing 24th in the standings with 177 points. On January 27, 2025, it was announced that Kitzmiller would run the full schedule, with ten-time series champion Frank Kimmel serving as his crew chief for CR7. Kitzmiller would finish the season third in the final point standings with two top-fives and fourteen top-tens.

=== ARCA Menards Series East ===
Kitzmiller would make his debut in the ARCA Menards Series East in a combination event with the ARCA Menards Series at the 2020 Bush's Beans 200, finishing thirteenth. He would race in the next year's Bristol race, this time finishing 22nd. On January 27, 2025, it was announced that Kitzmiller would run part-time in 2025 with CR7.

=== ARCA Menards Series West ===
On January 27, 2025, it was announced that Kitzmiller would run part-time in 2025 with CR7.

=== NASCAR Truck Series ===
On February 10, 2022, CR7 Motorsports announced that Kitzmiller would make his NASCAR Camping World Truck Series start in the 2022 NextEra Energy 250, driving the No. 97 (his main ARCA number), a second entry for the team. However, he withdrew from the event after crashing his primary truck in practice and not having a backup truck.

== Personal life ==
Kitzmiller has been the president of A. L. L. Construction, a construction company in West Virginia, since 2004.

== Motorsports career results ==
=== Stock car career summary ===
Season	Series	Team	Races	Wins	Top 5	Top 10	Points	Position
2020	ARCA Menards Series East	CR7 Motorsports	1	0	0	0	34	35th
2020	ARCA Menards Series	CR7 Motorsports	7	0	0	3	212	18th
2021	ARCA Menards Series East	CR7 Motorsports	1	0	0	0	22	53rd
2021	ARCA Menards Series	CR7 Motorsports	6	0	0	0	177	24th
2022	ARCA Menards Series	CR7 Motorsports	4	0	0	1	107	34th
2022	NASCAR Camping World Truck Series	CR7 Motorsports	0	0	0	0	0	115th
2023	CARS Late Model Stock Car Tour	N/A	4	0	0	0	29	37th
2023	ARCA Menards Series	CR7 Motorsports	5	0	0	0	129	34th
2024	CARS Late Model Stock Car Tour	Vandyke Racing Performance	2	0	0	0	0	N/A
2024	ARCA Menards Series	CR7 Motorsports	5	0	0	4	155	29th
2025	CARS Pro Late Model Tour	Rackley W.A.R.	4	0	1	1	105	21st
2025	ARCA Menards Series West	CR7 Motorsports	1	0	0	0	17	78th
2025	ARCA Menards Series East	CR7 Motorsports	4	0	0	4	191	10th
2025	ARCA Menards Series	CR7 Motorsports	19	0	2	14	854	**3rd**
2025	ARCA Menards Series	ACR Motorsports	1	0	0	0	854	**3rd**
2026	ARCA Menards Series West	CR7 Motorsports	1	0	0	0	28	68th
2026	ARCA Menards Series East	CR7 Motorsports	4	0	0	1	117	16th
2026	ARCA Menards Series	CR7 Motorsports	19	0	1	11	736	5th
2026	NASCAR Craftsman Truck Series	CR7 Motorsports	1	0	0	0	7	83rd

=== NASCAR ===
(key) (Bold – Pole position awarded by qualifying time. Italics – Pole position earned by points standings or practice time. * – Most laps led.)

==== Craftsman Truck Series ====
NASCAR Craftsman Truck Series results
Year	Team	No.	Make	1	2	3	4	5	6	7	8	9	10	11	12	13	14	15	16	17	18	19	20	21	22	23	24	25	NCTC	Pts	Ref
2022	CR7 Motorsports	97	Chevy	DAY; Wth	LVS	ATL	COA	MAR	BRI	DAR	KAN	TEX	CLT	GTW	SON	KNO	NSH	MOH	POC	IRP	RCH	KAN	BRI	TAL	HOM	PHO			115th	N/A	
2026	CR7 Motorsports	97	Chevy	DAY; 30	ATL	STP	DAR	CAR	BRI	TEX	GLN	DOV	CLT	NSH	MCH	COR	LRP	NWS	IRP	RCH	NHA	BRI	KAN	CLT	PHO	TAL	MAR	HOM	83rd	7	

=== ARCA Menards Series ===
(key) (Bold – Pole position awarded by qualifying time. Italics – Pole position earned by points standings or practice time. * – Most laps led.)

ARCA Menards Series results
Year	Team	No.	Make	1	2	3	4	5	6	7	8	9	10	11	12	13	14	15	16	17	18	19	20	AMSC	Pts	Ref
2020	CR7 Motorsports	97	Chevy	DAY; 32	PHO	TAL; 8	POC; 14	IRP	KEN; 10	IOW	KAN; 11	TOL	TOL	MCH; 8	DAY	GTW	L44	TOL	BRI; 13	WIN	MEM	ISF	KAN	18th	212	
2021	CR7 Motorsports	97	Chevy	DAY; 11	PHO	TAL; 15	KAN	TOL	CLT; 11	MOH	POC; 17	ELK	BLN	IOW	WIN	GLN	MCH; 12	ISF	MLW	DSF	BRI; 22	SLM	KAN	24th	177	
2022	CR7 Motorsports	97	Chevy	DAY; 34	PHO	TAL; 14	KAN	CLT	IOW	BLN	ELK	MOH	POC; 9	IRP	MCH; 12	GLN	ISF	MLW	DSF	KAN	BRI	SLM	TOL	34th	107	
2023	CR7 Motorsports	97	Chevy	DAY; 19	PHO	TAL; 26	KAN; 23	CLT	BLN	ELK	MOH	IOW	POC; 11	MCH; 13	IRP	GLN	ISF	MLW	DSF	KAN	BRI	SLM	TOL	34th	129	
2024	CR7 Motorsports	97	Chevy	DAY; 6	PHO	TAL; 33	DOV	KAN	CLT; 9	IOW	MOH	BLN	IRP	SLM	ELK	MCH; 7	ISF	MLW	DSF	GLN	BRI	KAN; 10	TOL	29th	155	
2025	CR7 Motorsports	97	Chevy	DAY; 3	PHO; 27	TAL; 5	KAN; 7		MCH; 8	BLN; 8	ELK; 6	LRP; 19	DOV; 8	IRP; 8	IOW; 10	GLN; 17	ISF; 10	MAD; 7	DSF; 14	BRI; 9	SLM; 11	KAN; 9	TOL; 9	3rd	854	
2025	ACR Motorsports	79	Chevy					CLT; 32																3rd	854	
2026	CR7 Motorsports	97	Chevy	DAY; 7	PHO; 16	KAN; 6	TAL; 33	GLN; 23	TOL; 7	MCH; 23	POC; 9	BER; 10	ELK; 5	CHI; 9	LRP; 17	IRP; 16	IOW; 25	ISF; 10	MAD; 9	DSF; 7	SLM	BRI; 11	KAN; 7	5th	736	

==== ARCA Menards Series East ====
ARCA Menards Series East results
Year	Team	No.	Make	1	2	3	4	5	6	7	8	AMSEC	Pts	Ref
2020	CR7 Motorsports	97	Chevy	NSM	TOL	DOV; DNS	TOL	BRI; 13	FIF			35th	34	
2021	CR7 Motorsports	97	Chevy	NSM	FIF	NSV	DOV	SNM	IOW	MLW	BRI; 22	53rd	22	
2025	CR7 Motorsports	97	Chevy	FIF	CAR	NSV	FRS	DOV; 8	IRP; 8	IOW; 10	BRI; 9	10th	191	
2026	CR7 Motorsports	97	Chevy	HCY	CAR	NSV	TOL; 7	IRP; 16	FRS	IOW; 25	BRI; 11	16th	117	

==== ARCA Menards Series West ====
ARCA Menards Series West results
Year	Team	No.	Make	1	2	3	4	5	6	7	8	9	10	11	12	13	AMSWC	Pts	Ref
2025	CR7 Motorsports	97	Chevy	KER	PHO; 27	TUC	CNS	KER	SON	TRI	PIR	AAS	MAD	LVS	PHO		78th	17	
2026	CR7 Motorsports	97	Chevy	KER	PHO; 16	TUC	SHA	CNS	TRI	SON	PIR	AAS	MAD	LVS	PHO	KER	68th	28	

=== CARS Late Model Stock Car Tour ===
(key) (Bold – Pole position awarded by qualifying time. Italics – Pole position earned by points standings or practice time. * – Most laps led. ** – All laps led.)

CARS Late Model Stock Car Tour results
Year	Team	No.	Make	1	2	3	4	5	6	7	8	9	10	11	12	13	14	15	16	17	CLMSCTC	Pts	Ref
2023	N/A	97A	Chevy	SNM; 26	FLC; 31	HCY	ACE	NWS; 25	LGY	DOM	CRW; 21	HCY	ACE	TCM	WKS	AAS	SBO	TCM	CRW		37th	29	
2024	Vandyke Racing Performance	97A	Chevy	SNM	HCY	AAS	OCS	ACE	TCM	LGY	DOM; 14	CRW; 21	HCY	NWS	ACE	WCS	FLC	SBO	TCM	NWS	N/A	0	

=== CARS Pro Late Model Tour ===
(key)

CARS Pro Late Model Tour results
Year	Team	No.	Make	1	2	3	4	5	6	7	8	9	10	11	12	13	CPLMTC	Pts	Ref
2025	Rackley W.A.R.	25	Chevy	AAS	CDL	OCS	ACE; 5										21st	105	
2025	Rackley W.A.R.	97K	Chevy					NWS; 22	CRW; 15	HCY	HCY	AND	FLC	SBO	TCM	NWS; 21	21st	105	
