= 2020 General Tire AnywhereIsPossible 200 =

2020 General Tire #AnywhereIsPossible 200
Race details
- Race 4 of 20 of the 2020 ARCA Menards Series
- Date: June 26, 2020
- Official name: 36th Annual General Tire #AnywhereIsPossible 200
- Location: Long Pond, Pennsylvania, Pocono Raceway
- Course: Permanent racing facility
- Course length: 2.5 miles (4.0 km)
- Distance: 80 laps, 200 mi (321.869 km)
- Scheduled distance: 80 laps, 200 mi (321.869 km)
- Average speed: 113.654 miles per hour (182.908 km/h)

Pole position
Driver	Michael Self	Venturini Motorsports
- Time: Set by 2020 owner's points

Most laps led
Driver	Ty Gibbs	Joe Gibbs Racing
- Laps: 65

Winner
No. 18	Ty Gibbs	Joe Gibbs Racing

Television in the United States
- Network: Fox Sports 1
- Announcers: David Rieff, Phil Parsons

Radio in the United States
- Radio: Motor Racing Network

The 2020 General Tire #AnywhereIsPossible 200 was the fourth stock car race of the 2020 ARCA Menards Series and the 36th iteration of the event. The race was held on Friday, June 26, 2020, in Long Pond, Pennsylvania, at Pocono Raceway, a 2.5 miles (4.0 km) triangular permanent course. The race took the scheduled 80 laps to complete. At race's end, Ty Gibbs of Joe Gibbs Racing would lead a dominant race to win his third career ARCA Menards Series win and his first of the season. To fill out the podium, Chandler Smith of Venturini Motorsports and Sam Mayer of GMS Racing would finish second and third, respectively.

== Background ==
The race was held at Pocono Raceway, which is a three-turn superspeedway located in Long Pond, Pennsylvania. The track hosts two annual NASCAR Sprint Cup Series races, as well as one Xfinity Series and Camping World Truck Series event. Until 2019, the track also hosted an IndyCar Series race.

Pocono Raceway is one of a very few NASCAR tracks not owned by either Speedway Motorsports, Inc. or International Speedway Corporation. It is operated by the Igdalsky siblings Brandon, Nicholas, and sister Ashley, and cousins Joseph IV and Chase Mattioli, all of whom are third-generation members of the family-owned Mattco Inc, started by Joseph II and Rose Mattioli.

Outside of the NASCAR races, the track is used throughout the year by Sports Car Club of America (SCCA) and motorcycle clubs as well as racing schools and an IndyCar race. The triangular oval also has three separate infield sections of racetrack – North Course, East Course and South Course. Each of these infield sections use a separate portion of the tri-oval to complete the track. During regular non-race weekends, multiple clubs can use the track by running on different infield sections. Also some of the infield sections can be run in either direction, or multiple infield sections can be put together – such as running the North Course and the South Course and using the tri-oval to connect the two.

=== Entry list ===
#	Driver	Team	Make	Sponsor
0	Don Thompson*	Wayne Peterson Racing	Chevrolet	Great Railing
01	Tommy Vigh Jr.	Fast Track Racing	Chevrolet	Fast Track Racing
4	Hailie Deegan	DGR-Crosley	Ford	Monster Energy
06	Tim Richmond*	Wayne Peterson Racing	Chevrolet	Wayne Peterson Racing
8	Russ Lane	Empire Racing	Toyota	National Auto Sport Association Central Region
10	Ryan Huff	Fast Track Racing	Ford	H. B. Hankins, Inc.
11	Clay Greenfield	Fast Track Racing	Ford	Rackley Roofing
12	Ed Pompa	Fast Track Racing	Chevrolet	Green Renewable, Inc., Double "H" Ranch
15	Drew Dollar	Venturini Motorsports	Toyota	Dollar Concrete Construction Company, Lynx Capital
17	Tanner Gray	DGR-Crosley	Ford	Ford Performance
18	Ty Gibbs	Joe Gibbs Racing	Toyota	Monster Energy
20	Chandler Smith	Venturini Motorsports	Toyota	JBL
21	Sam Mayer	GMS Racing	Chevrolet	AO1 Foundation
22	Derek Griffith	Chad Bryant Racing	Ford	Original Gourmet Lollipops
23	Bret Holmes	Bret Holmes Racing	Chevrolet	Holmes II Excavating
25	Michael Self	Venturini Motorsports	Toyota	Sinclair
46	Thad Moffitt	DGR-Crosley	Ford	Performance Plus Motor Oil Richard Petty Signature Series
48	Brad Smith	Brad Smith Motorsports	Chevrolet	Home Building Solutions, NASCAR Low Teams
69	Scott Melton	Kimmel Racing	Toyota	Melton-McFadden Insurance Agency
82	Sean Corr	Empire Racing	Chevrolet	Yelverton's Enrichment Services "Thank You Essential Workers"
97	Jason Kitzmiller	CR7 Motorsports	Chevrolet	A. L. L. Construction
Official entry list

*The #0 would withdraw due to one of the team's engines blowing up at the previous race. As a result, Thompson would replace Richmond in the #06 for the weekend.

== Practice ==
The only 45-minute practice session would take place on Friday, June 26. Chandler Smith of Venturini Motorsports would set the fastest time in the session, with a 54.062 and an average speed of 166.476 miles per hour (267.917 km/h).

Pos.	#	Driver	Team	Make	Time	Speed
1	20	Chandler Smith	Venturini Motorsports	Toyota	54.062	166.476
2	25	Michael Self	Venturini Motorsports	Toyota	54.335	165.639
3	17	Tanner Gray	DGR-Crosley	Ford	54.610	164.805
Full practice results

== Starting lineup ==
The starting lineup was determined by the current 2020 owner's points. As a result, Michael Self of Venturini Motorsports would win the pole.

=== Full starting lineup ===
Pos.	#	Driver	Team	Make
1	25	Michael Self	Venturini Motorsports	Toyota
2	18	Ty Gibbs	Joe Gibbs Racing	Toyota
3	15	Drew Dollar	Venturini Motorsports	Toyota
4	20	Chandler Smith	Venturini Motorsports	Toyota
5	23	Bret Holmes	Bret Holmes Racing	Chevrolet
6	46	Thad Moffitt	DGR-Crosley	Ford
7	4	Hailie Deegan	DGR-Crosley	Ford
8	12	Ed Pompa	Fast Track Racing	Chevrolet
9	69	Scott Melton	Kimmel Racing	Toyota
10	17	Tanner Gray	DGR-Crosley	Ford
11	11	Clay Greenfield	Fast Track Racing	Ford
12	8	Russ Lane	Empire Racing	Toyota
13	10	Ryan Huff	Fast Track Racing	Ford
14	06	Don Thompson	Wayne Peterson Racing	Chevrolet
15	22	Derek Griffith	Chad Bryant Racing	Ford
16	01	Tommy Vigh Jr.	Fast Track Racing	Chevrolet
17	97	Jason Kitzmiller	CR7 Motorsports	Chevrolet
18	21	Sam Mayer	GMS Racing	Chevrolet
19	48	Brad Smith	Brad Smith Motorsports	Chevrolet
20	82	Sean Corr	Empire Racing	Chevrolet
Withdrew
WD	0	Don Thompson	Wayne Peterson Racing	Chevrolet
Official starting lineup

== Race results ==
Fin	St	#	Driver	Team	Make	Laps	Led	Status	Pts
1	2	18	Ty Gibbs	Joe Gibbs Racing	Toyota	80	65	running	48
2	4	20	Chandler Smith	Venturini Motorsports	Toyota	80	4	running	43
3	18	21	Sam Mayer	GMS Racing	Chevrolet	80	0	running	41
4	5	23	Bret Holmes	Bret Holmes Racing	Chevrolet	80	0	running	40
5	1	25	Michael Self	Venturini Motorsports	Toyota	80	11	running	40
6	3	15	Drew Dollar	Venturini Motorsports	Toyota	80	0	running	38
7	7	4	Hailie Deegan	DGR-Crosley	Ford	80	0	running	37
8	15	22	Derek Griffith	Chad Bryant Racing	Ford	80	0	running	36
9	13	10	Ryan Huff	Fast Track Racing	Ford	79	0	running	35
10	9	69	Scott Melton	Kimmel Racing	Toyota	79	0	running	34
11	8	12	Ed Pompa	Fast Track Racing	Chevrolet	77	0	running	33
12	20	82	Sean Corr	Empire Racing	Chevrolet	75	0	running	32
13	19	48	Brad Smith	Brad Smith Motorsports	Chevrolet	72	0	running	31
14	17	97	Jason Kitzmiller	CR7 Motorsports	Chevrolet	54	0	crash	30
15	10	17	Tanner Gray	DGR-Crosley	Ford	37	0	suspension	29
16	11	11	Clay Greenfield	Fast Track Racing	Ford	29	0	electrical	28
17	12	8	Russ Lane	Empire Racing	Toyota	28	0	oil line	27
18	14	06	Don Thompson	Wayne Peterson Racing	Chevrolet	11	0	overheating	26
19	16	01	Tommy Vigh Jr.	Fast Track Racing	Chevrolet	9	0	vibration	25
20	6	46	Thad Moffitt	DGR-Crosley	Ford	2	0	engine	24
Withdrew
WD		0	Don Thompson	Wayne Peterson Racing	Chevrolet				

Previous race: 2020 General Tire 200	ARCA Menards Series; 2020 season	Next race: 2020 Calypso Lemonade 200
