= 2020 General Tire 150 (Kentucky) =

Race details
- Race 6 of 20 of the 2020 ARCA Menards Series
- Date: July 11, 2020
- Official name: 15th Annual General Tire 150
- Location: Sparta, Kentucky, Kentucky Speedway
- Course: Permanent racing facility
- Course length: 2.41 km (1.5 miles)
- Distance: 100 laps, 150 mi (241.402 km)
- Scheduled distance: 100 laps, 150 mi (241.402 km)
- Average speed: 104.692 miles per hour (168.485 km/h)

Pole position
Driver	Michael Self	Venturini Motorsports
- Time: Set by 2020 owner's points

Most laps led
Driver	Ty Gibbs	Joe Gibbs Racing
- Laps: 59

Winner
No. 18	Ty Gibbs	Joe Gibbs Racing

Television in the United States
- Network: Fox Sports 1
- Announcers: David Rieff, Todd Bodine

Radio in the United States
- Radio: Motor Racing Network

The 2020 General Tire 150 was the sixth stock car race of the 2020 ARCA Menards Series and the 15th iteration of the event. The race was held on Saturday, July 11, 2020, in Sparta, Kentucky, at Kentucky Speedway, a 1.5-mile (2.41 km) tri-oval speedway. The race took the scheduled 100 laps to complete. At race's end, Ty Gibbs of Joe Gibbs Racing would take control in the late stages of the race to take his fourth career ARCA Menards Series win and his second of the season. To fill out the podium, Bret Holmes of Bret Holmes Racing and Michael Self of Venturini Motorsports would finish second and third, respectively.

== Background ==
Kentucky Speedway is a 1.5-mile (2.4 km) tri-oval speedway in Sparta, Kentucky, which has hosted ARCA, NASCAR and Indy Racing League racing annually since it opened in 2000. The track is currently owned and operated by Speedway Motorsports, Inc. and Jerry Carroll, who, along with four other investors, owned Kentucky Speedway until 2008. The speedway has a grandstand capacity of 117,000. Construction of the speedway began in 1998 and was completed in mid-2000. The speedway has hosted the Gander RV & Outdoors Truck Series, Xfinity Series, IndyCar Series, Indy Lights, and most recently, the NASCAR Cup Series beginning in 2011.

The race was held without fans in attendance due to the ongoing COVID-19 pandemic.

=== Entry list ===
#	Driver	Team	Make	Sponsor
4	Hailie Deegan	DGR-Crosley	Ford	Wastequip WRX
06	Don Thompson	Wayne Peterson Racing	Chevrolet	Great Railing
10	Ryan Huff	Fast Track Racing	Ford	H. B. Hankins, Inc.
11	Willie Mullins	Fast Track Racing	Ford	CW Metals, Crow Wing Recycling
12	Dick Doheny	Fast Track Racing	Chevrolet	Fast Track Racing
15	Drew Dollar	Venturini Motorsports	Toyota	Dollar Concrete Construction Company, Lynx Capital
17	Tanner Gray	DGR-Crosley	Ford	Ford Performance
18	Ty Gibbs	Joe Gibbs Racing	Toyota	Monster Energy
20	Ryan Repko	Venturini Motorsports	Toyota	Craftsman
21	Sam Mayer	GMS Racing	Chevrolet	California Strong
22	Derek Griffith	Chad Bryant Racing	Ford	Original Gourmet Lollipops
23	Bret Holmes	Bret Holmes Racing	Chevrolet	Holmes II Excavating
25	Michael Self	Venturini Motorsports	Toyota	Sinclair
46	Thad Moffitt	DGR-Crosley	Ford	Alsco Uniforms Patriotic
48	Brad Smith	Brad Smith Motorsports	Chevrolet	Home Building Solutions, NASCAR Low Teams
69	Scott Melton	Kimmel Racing	Toyota	Melton-McFadden Insurance Agency
97	Jason Kitzmiller	CR7 Motorsports	Chevrolet	A. L. L. Construction
Official entry list

== Practice ==
The only one-hour practice session would take place on Saturday, July 11. Sam Mayer of GMS Racing would set the fastest time in the session, with a 30.199 and an average speed of 178.814 miles per hour (287.773 km/h).

Pos.	#	Driver	Team	Make	Time	Speed
1	21	Sam Mayer	GMS Racing	Chevrolet	30.199	178.814
2	25	Michael Self	Venturini Motorsports	Toyota	30.289	178.283
3	4	Hailie Deegan	DGR-Crosley	Ford	30.379	177.754
Full practice results

== Starting lineup ==
ARCA would not hold a qualifying session for the race. Therefore, the current 2020 owner's standings would be determined for who got the pole. As a result, Michael Self of Venturini Motorsports won the pole.

=== Full starting lineup ===
Pos.	#	Driver	Team	Make
1	25	Michael Self	Venturini Motorsports	Toyota
2	20	Ryan Repko	Venturini Motorsports	Toyota
3	18	Ty Gibbs	Joe Gibbs Racing	Toyota
4	15	Drew Dollar	Venturini Motorsports	Toyota
5	23	Bret Holmes	Bret Holmes Racing	Chevrolet
6	4	Hailie Deegan	DGR-Crosley	Ford
7	46	Thad Moffitt	DGR-Crosley	Ford
8	69	Scott Melton	Kimmel Racing	Toyota
9	17	Tanner Gray	DGR-Crosley	Ford
10	12	Dick Doheny	Fast Track Racing	Chevrolet
11	10	Ryan Huff	Fast Track Racing	Ford
12	11	Willie Mullins	Fast Track Racing	Ford
13	22	Derek Griffith	Chad Bryant Racing	Ford
14	06	Don Thompson	Wayne Peterson Racing	Chevrolet
15	21	Sam Mayer	GMS Racing	Chevrolet
16	48	Brad Smith	Brad Smith Motorsports	Chevrolet
17	97	Jason Kitzmiller	CR7 Motorsports	Chevrolet
Official starting lineup

== Race results ==
Fin	St	#	Driver	Team	Make	Laps	Led	Status	Pts
1	3	18	Ty Gibbs	Joe Gibbs Racing	Toyota	100	59	running	48
2	5	23	Bret Holmes	Bret Holmes Racing	Chevrolet	100	17	running	43
3	1	25	Michael Self	Venturini Motorsports	Toyota	100	23	running	42
4	15	21	Sam Mayer	GMS Racing	Chevrolet	100	1	running	41
5	4	15	Drew Dollar	Venturini Motorsports	Toyota	100	0	running	39
6	2	20	Ryan Repko	Venturini Motorsports	Toyota	100	0	running	38
7	13	22	Derek Griffith	Chad Bryant Racing	Ford	100	0	running	37
8	11	10	Ryan Huff	Fast Track Racing	Ford	100	0	running	36
9	9	17	Tanner Gray	DGR-Crosley	Ford	100	0	running	35
10	17	97	Jason Kitzmiller	CR7 Motorsports	Chevrolet	100	0	running	34
11	12	11	Willie Mullins	Fast Track Racing	Ford	98	0	running	33
12	16	48	Brad Smith	Brad Smith Motorsports	Chevrolet	91	0	running	32
13	10	12	Dick Doheny	Fast Track Racing	Chevrolet	81	0	running	31
14	6	4	Hailie Deegan	DGR-Crosley	Ford	77	0	crash	30
15	7	46	Thad Moffitt	DGR-Crosley	Ford	70	0	crash	29
16	14	06	Don Thompson	Wayne Peterson Racing	Chevrolet	19	0	suspension	28
17	8	69	Scott Melton	Kimmel Racing	Toyota	16	0	crash	27
Official race results

Previous race: 2020 Calypso Lemonade 200	ARCA Menards Series; 2020 season	Next race: 2020 Shore Lunch 150
