= Drew Dollar =

American racing driver (born 2000)

- Born: Andrew Joseph Dollar; December 2, 2000 (age 25); Atlanta, Georgia, U.S.

NASCAR O'Reilly Auto Parts Series career
- 2 races run over 1 year
- 2022 position: 56th
- Best finish: 56th (2022)
- First race: 2022 Beef. It's What's for Dinner. 300 (Daytona)
- Last race: 2022 Ag-Pro 300 (Talladega)
Wins	Top tens	Poles
0	0	0

NASCAR FedEx Freight Truck Series career
- 8 races run over 1 year
- 2021 position: 36th
- Best finish: 36th (2021)
- First race: 2021 NextEra Energy 250 (Daytona)
- Last race: 2021 Lucas Oil 150 (Phoenix)
Wins	Top tens	Poles
0	1	0

ARCA Menards Series career
- 38 races run over 4 years
- ARCA no., team: No. 18 (Kyle Busch Motorsports)
- Best finish: 4th (2020)
- First race: 2019 Day to Day Coffee 150 (Gateway)
- Last race: 2022 General Tire 150 (Charlotte)
- First win: 2020 General Tire 200 (Talladega)
Wins	Top tens	Poles
1	25	2

ARCA Menards Series East career
- 13 races run over 3 years
- Best finish: 9th (2019)
- First race: 2019 New Smyrna 175 (New Smyrna)
- Last race: 2021 Bush's Beans 200 (Bristol)
Wins	Top tens	Poles
0	9	0

ARCA Menards Series West career
- 4 races run over 3 years
- ARCA West no., team: No. 20 (Venturini Motorsports)
- Best finish: 22nd (2020)
- First race: 2020 Arizona Lottery 100 (Phoenix Raceway)
- Last race: 2021 Arizona Lottery 100 (Phoenix)
Wins	Top tens	Poles
0	3	0

Andrew Joseph Dollar (born December 2, 2000) is an American former professional stock car racing driver. He last competed part-time in the NASCAR Xfinity Series, driving the No. 18 Toyota Supra for Joe Gibbs Racing and part-time in the ARCA Menards Series, driving the No. 18 Toyota Camry for Kyle Busch Motorsports. He has raced in the NASCAR Craftsman Truck Series, ARCA Menards Series East and the ARCA Menards Series West. He is most known for getting into multiple feuds with drivers and team owners. He quietly stepped away after the 2022 season to focus on college.

== Racing career ==
Dollar signed with DGR-Crosley in October 2018 to drive part-time in what was then known as the NASCAR K&N Pro Series East as well as in the CARS Late Model Stock Tour.

Dollar was put in the No. 54 car when the season started, and drove it for the first seven races of the year. He also drove the No. 17 in one race, the season finale at Dover. In his first race in the series and with his team, which came at New Smyrna, he qualified second, led 48 laps and finished ninth in the race. He ended up running almost all the races in his rookie season, only missing out on Watkins Glen, Bristol, Gateway, and New Hampshire. With his solid finishes (all but one were top-tens), he was able to finish ninth in points.

Also, Dollar competed in two ARCA Menards Series races for DGR-Crosley, driving their No. 4 Toyota at both Gateway and Kansas, finishing 6th and 7th, respectfully, as well as one K&N Pro Series West race at Phoenix in preparation for the new ARCA race at the track which was added to the schedule for the following year. In his first West Series start, he finished 18th after a crash.

It was announced on December 19, 2019, that Dollar would be moving from DGR to Venturini Motorsports for the 2020 season, running full-time in ARCA in the No. 15 Toyota, replacing Christian Eckes, who moved up to the Truck Series full-time with Kyle Busch Motorsports after winning the 2019 series championship. Crew chief Shannon Rursch, who worked with Michael Self's No. 25 Venturini ARCA team in 2019, was announced to lead Dollar's No. 15 team in 2020. On June 20, 2020, Dollar got his first ARCA Menards Series win at Talladega. It was only his fifth start in the series. At the conclusion of the season, Dollar was fourth in the championship and was runner-up in Rookie of the Year standings.

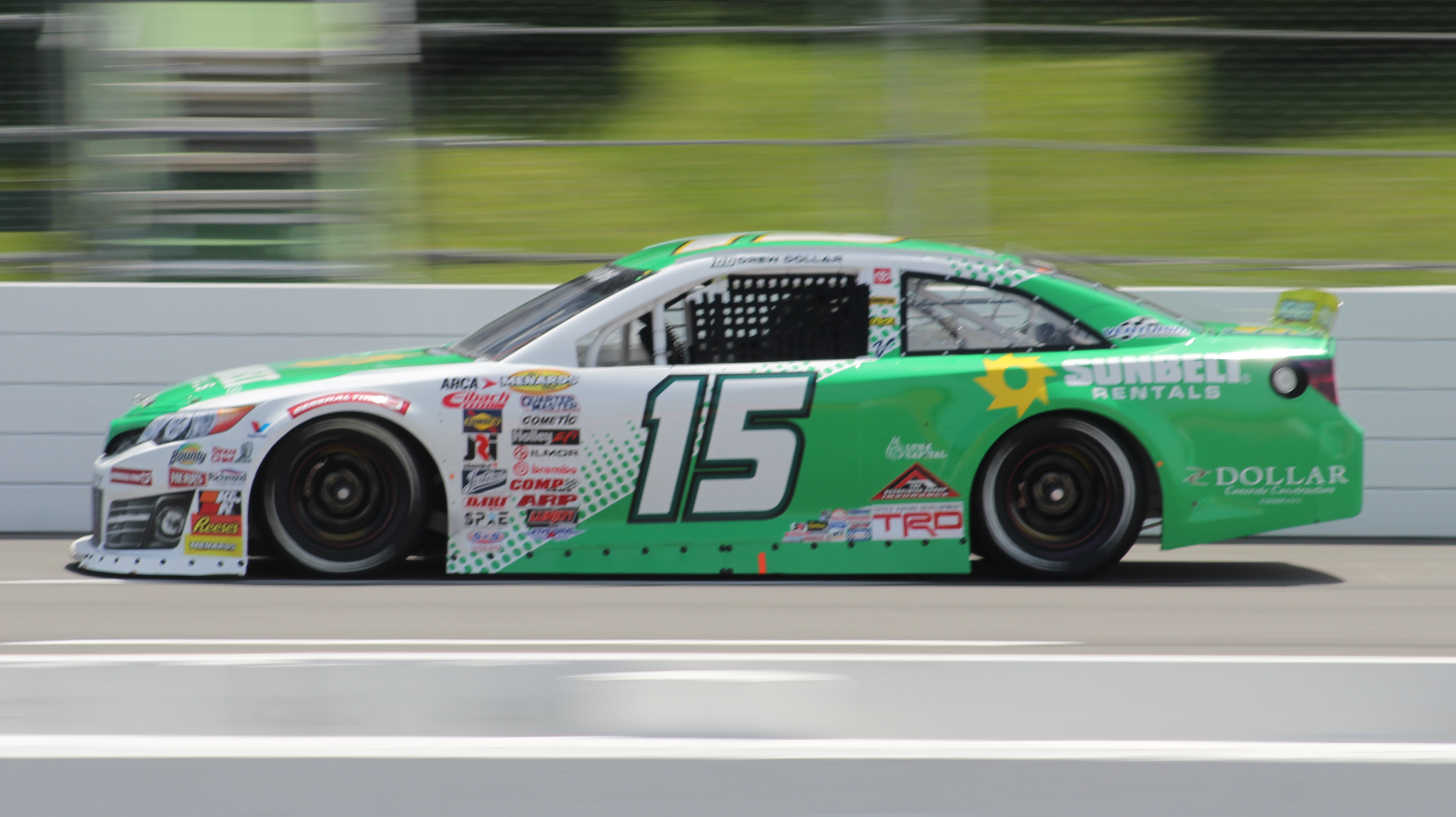
Dollar at Pocono Raceway in 2021

In 2021, Dollar returned to Venturini, but was reduced down to a part-time schedule in the No. 15 with former Bill McAnally Racing ARCA West Series driver Gracie Trotter, and was given eleven races in the big ARCA Series, plus one additional race in both the East Series (at Dover) and West Series (at Phoenix in November). On January 28, 2021, it was announced that Dollar would run a part-time schedule in the NASCAR Camping World Truck Series in the No. 51 for Kyle Busch Motorsports, another team that is part of the Toyota development pipeline. His eight race schedule begins with the season-opener at Daytona.

In 2022, Kyle Busch Motorsports took over Joe Gibbs Racing’s ARCA operations. They signed Dollar to a four race deal in the ARCA Menards Series in the No. 18 car.

At the 2022 Kansas ARCA race, Dollar was battling for the lead with Corey Heim when he spun out, crashing both cars out of the race. After the incident, Dollar’s former team owner when he drove the No. 15, Billy Venturini, who was also the owner of Heim’s No. 20 Toyota, was interviewed by Fox Sports. Venturini said, “Drew wrecks all your [expletive] when driving for you then he wrecks it all when he's driving against ya... Just typical, bonehead move by Drew... Great kid, does not need to be a race car driver. He's got a lot of other thing he could probably do to make a good living.” Dollar ran one more ARCA race at Charlotte Motor Speedway, finishing 24th after crashing out. Dollar has not made a start since.

== Motorsports career results ==
=== NASCAR ===
(key) (Bold – Pole position awarded by qualifying time. Italics – Pole position earned by points standings or practice time. * – Most laps led.)

==== Xfinity Series ====
NASCAR Xfinity Series results
Year	Team	No.	Make	1	2	3	4	5	6	7	8	9	10	11	12	13	14	15	16	17	18	19	20	21	22	23	24	25	26	27	28	29	30	31	32	33	NXSC	Pts	Ref
2022	Joe Gibbs Racing	18	Toyota	DAY; 36	CAL	LVS	PHO	ATL	COA	RCH	MAR	TAL; 13	DOV	DAR	TEX	CLT	PIR	NSH	ROA	ATL	NHA	POC	IND	MCH	GLN	DAY	DAR	KAN	BRI	TEX	TAL	CLT	LVS	HOM	MAR	PHO	56th	30	

==== Camping World Truck Series ====
NASCAR Camping World Truck Series results
Year	Team	No.	Make	1	2	3	4	5	6	7	8	9	10	11	12	13	14	15	16	17	18	19	20	21	22	NCWTC	Pts	Ref
2021	Kyle Busch Motorsports	51	Toyota	DAY; 10	DRC	LVS	ATL	BRI	RCH	KAN	DAR	COA	CLT; 20	TEX; 33	NSH; 24	POC	KNX	GLN	GTW	DAR	BRI; 34	LVS; 24	TAL; 35	MAR	PHO; 18	36th	102	

=== ARCA Menards Series ===
(key) (Bold – Pole position awarded by qualifying time. Italics – Pole position earned by points standings or practice time. * – Most laps led.)

ARCA Menards Series results
Year	Team	No.	Make	1	2	3	4	5	6	7	8	9	10	11	12	13	14	15	16	17	18	19	20	AMSC	Pts	Ref
2019	DGR-Crosley	4	Toyota	DAY	FIF	SLM	TAL	NSH	TOL	CLT	POC	MCH	MAD	GTW; 6	CHI	ELK	IOW	POC	ISF	DSF	SLM	IRP	KAN; 7	43rd	395	
2020	Venturini Motorsports	15	Toyota	DAY; 3	PHO; 14	TAL; 1*	POC; 6	IRP; 14	KEN; 3	IOW; 17	KAN; 7	TOL; 6	TOL; 9	MCH; 4	DRC; 12	GTW; 7	L44; 9	TOL; 15	BRI; 18	WIN; 6	MEM; 8	ISF; 7	KAN; 8	4th	860	
2021	Venturini Motorsports	15	Toyota	**DAY**; 2	PHO; 7	TAL; 4*	KAN; 2	TOL	CLT; 3	MOH; 12	POC; 3	ELK	BLN	IOW	WIN	GLN; 15	MCH; 18	ISF	MLW	DSF	BRI; 8	SLM	KAN; 4	7th	444	
2022	Kyle Busch Motorsports	18	Toyota	DAY; 19	PHO	TAL; 7*	KAN; 15	CLT; 24	IOW	BLN	ELK	MOH	POC	IRP	MCH	GLN	ISF	MLW	DSF	KAN	BRI	SLM	TOL	30th	114	

==== ARCA Menards Series East ====
ARCA Menards Series East results
Year	Team	No.	Make	1	2	3	4	5	6	7	8	9	10	11	12	AMSEC	Pts	Ref
2019	DGR-Crosley	54	Toyota	NSM; 9	BRI; 4	SBO; 12	SBO; 6	MEM; 7	NHA; 8	IOW; 7	GLN	BRI	GTW	NHA		9th	297	
2019	DGR-Crosley	17	Toyota												DOV; 4	9th	297	
2020	Venturini Motorsports	15	Toyota	NSM	TOL	DOV; 5	TOL; 15	BRI; 18	FIF							18th	94	
2021	Venturini Motorsports	15	Toyota	NSM	FIF	NSV	DOV; 16	SNM	IOW	MLW	BRI; 8					19th	97	

==== ARCA Menards Series West ====
ARCA Menards Series West results
Year	Team	No.	Make	1	2	3	4	5	6	7	8	9	10	11	12	13	14	AMSWC	Pts	Ref
2019	DGR-Crosley	15	Toyota	LVS	IRW	TUS	TUS	CNS	SON	DCS	IOW	EVG	GTW	MER	AAS	KCR	PHO; 15	58th	26	
2020	Venturini Motorsports	15	Toyota	LVS	MMP	MMP	IRW	EVG	DCS	CNS	LVS	AAS	KCR	PHO; 5				21st	89	
2021	Venturini Motorsports	15	Toyota	PHO; 7	SON	IRW	CNS	IRW	PIR	LVS	AAS	PHO; 7						26th	75	

=== CARS Late Model Stock Car Tour ===
(key) (Bold – Pole position awarded by qualifying time. Italics – Pole position earned by points standings or practice time. * – Most laps led. ** – All laps led.)

CARS Late Model Stock Car Tour results
Year	Team	No.	Make	1	2	3	4	5	6	7	8	9	10	11	CLMSCTC	Pts	Ref
2019	DGR-Crosley	54	Toyota	SNM; 7	HCY	OCS	ACE	MMS; 21	LGY; 22	DOM	CCS; 21		OCS; 8	SBO; 19	21st	102	
2019	DGR-Crosley	00	Toyota									HCY; DNQ			21st	102	
2020	R&S Race Cars	19	Toyota	SNM	ACE	HCY; 9	HCY	DOM	FCS	LGY	CCS	FLO	GRE		39th	24	

^{*} Season still in progress
