= Bret Holmes Racing =

Defunct NASCAR team

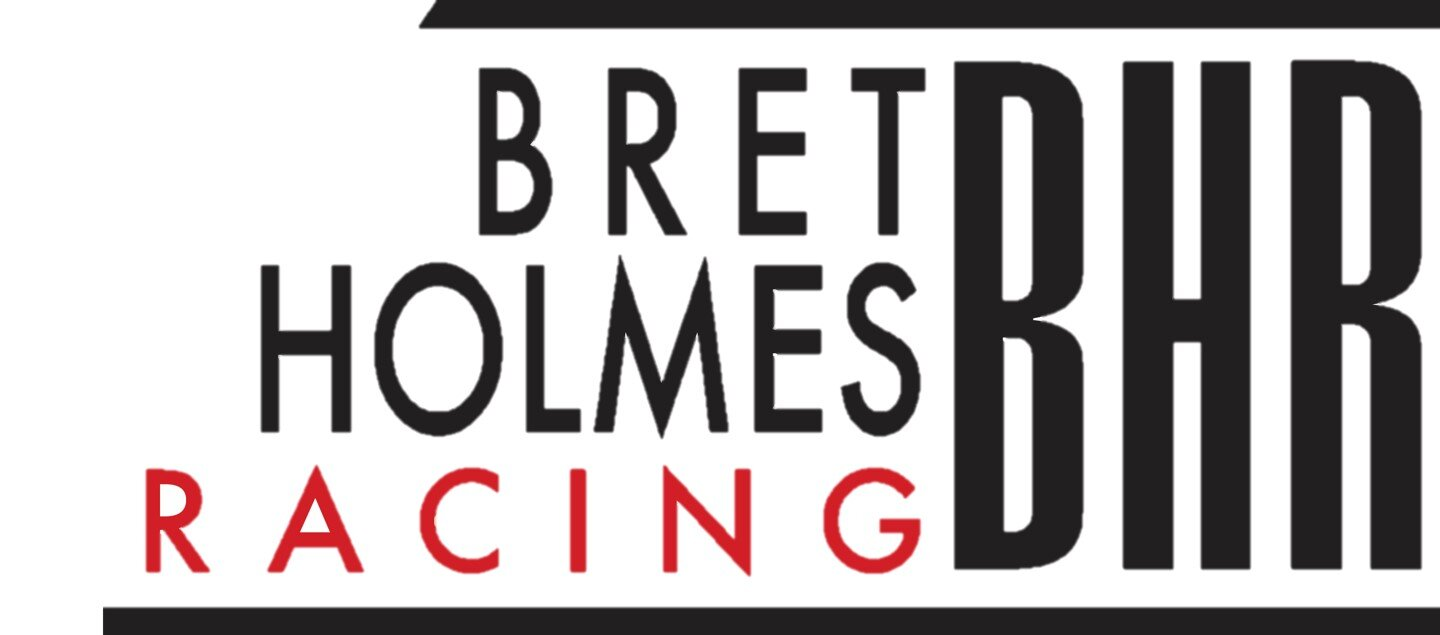
- Owner(s): Bret Holmes; Stacy Holmes
- Base: Mooresville, North Carolina
- Series: NASCAR Craftsman Truck Series
- Race drivers: Truck Series: 32. Bret Holmes
- Manufacturer: Chevrolet
- Opened: 2016 (ARCA); 2021 (Truck)
- Closed: 2024

Career
- Debut: Truck Series: 2021 Bucked Up 200 (Las Vegas); ARCA Menards Series: 2016 Music City 200 (Nashville Fairgrounds); ARCA Menards Series East: 2020 Herr's Potato Chips 200 (Toledo); ARCA Menards Series West: 2022 General Tire 150 (Phoenix)
- Races competed: Truck Series: 63; ARCA Menards Series: 99; ARCA Menards Series East: 6 ARCA Menards Series West: 1
- Drivers' Championships: Truck Series: 0 ARCA Menards Series: 1 (2020); ARCA Menards Series East: 0 ARCA Menards Series West: 0
- Race victories: Truck Series: 0 ARCA Menards Series: 2 ARCA Menards Series East: 0 ARCA Menards Series West: 0
- Pole positions: Truck Series: 0 ARCA Menards Series: 1 ARCA Menards Series East: 0 ARCA Menards Series West: 0

Bret Holmes Racing was an American professional stock car racing team that fielded the No. 32 full-time Chevrolet Silverado full-time in the NASCAR Craftsman Truck Series for owner Bret Holmes. The team had a technical alliance with Spire Motorsports. The team shut down its operations in 2024; its assets were sold to Late Model team owner Chris Hettinger, who renamed it Hettinger Racing.

== History ==
=== NASCAR Craftsman Truck Series ===
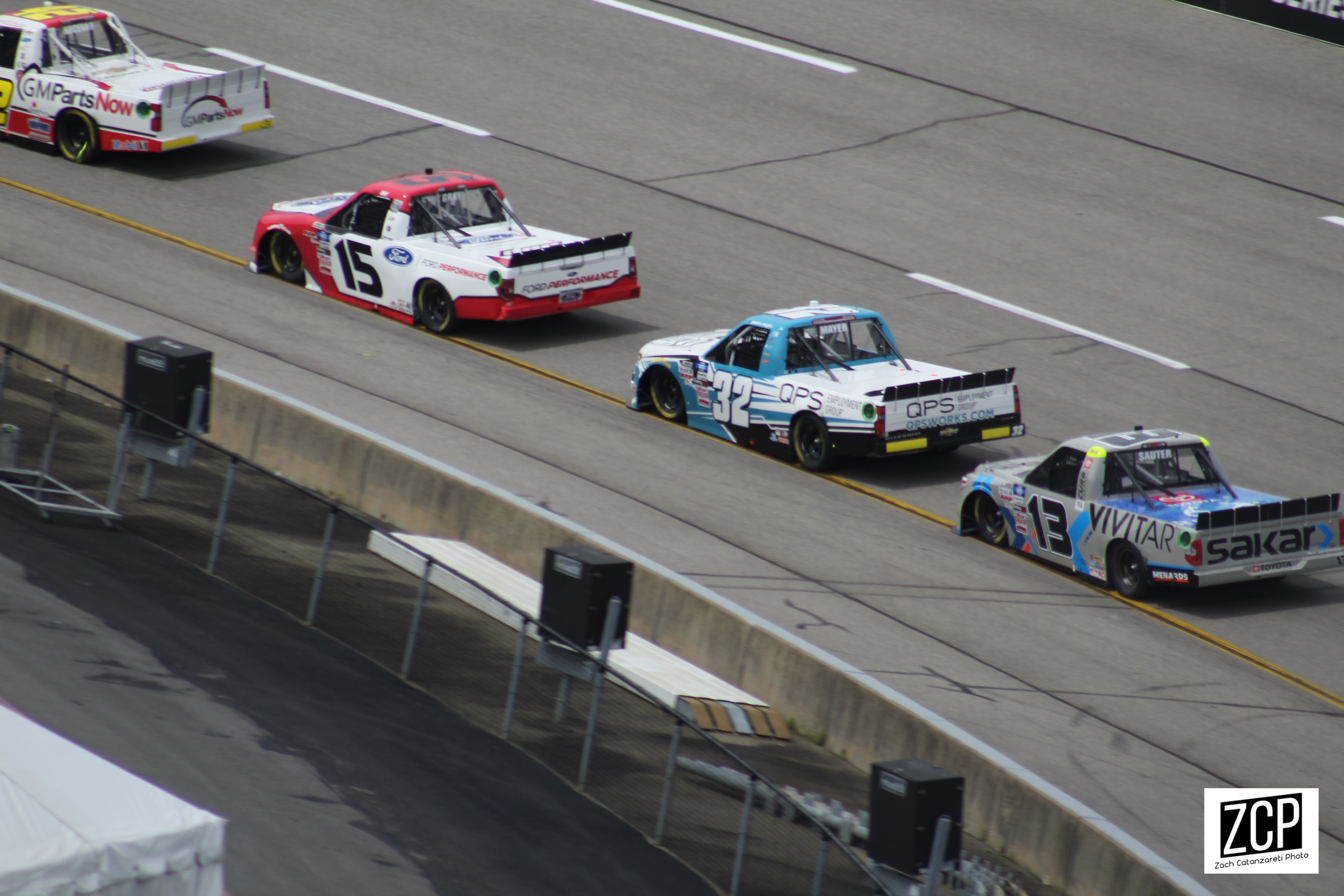
Sam Mayer (No. 32) racing Tanner Gray (No. 15) and Johnny Sauter (No. 13) at Richmond in 2021

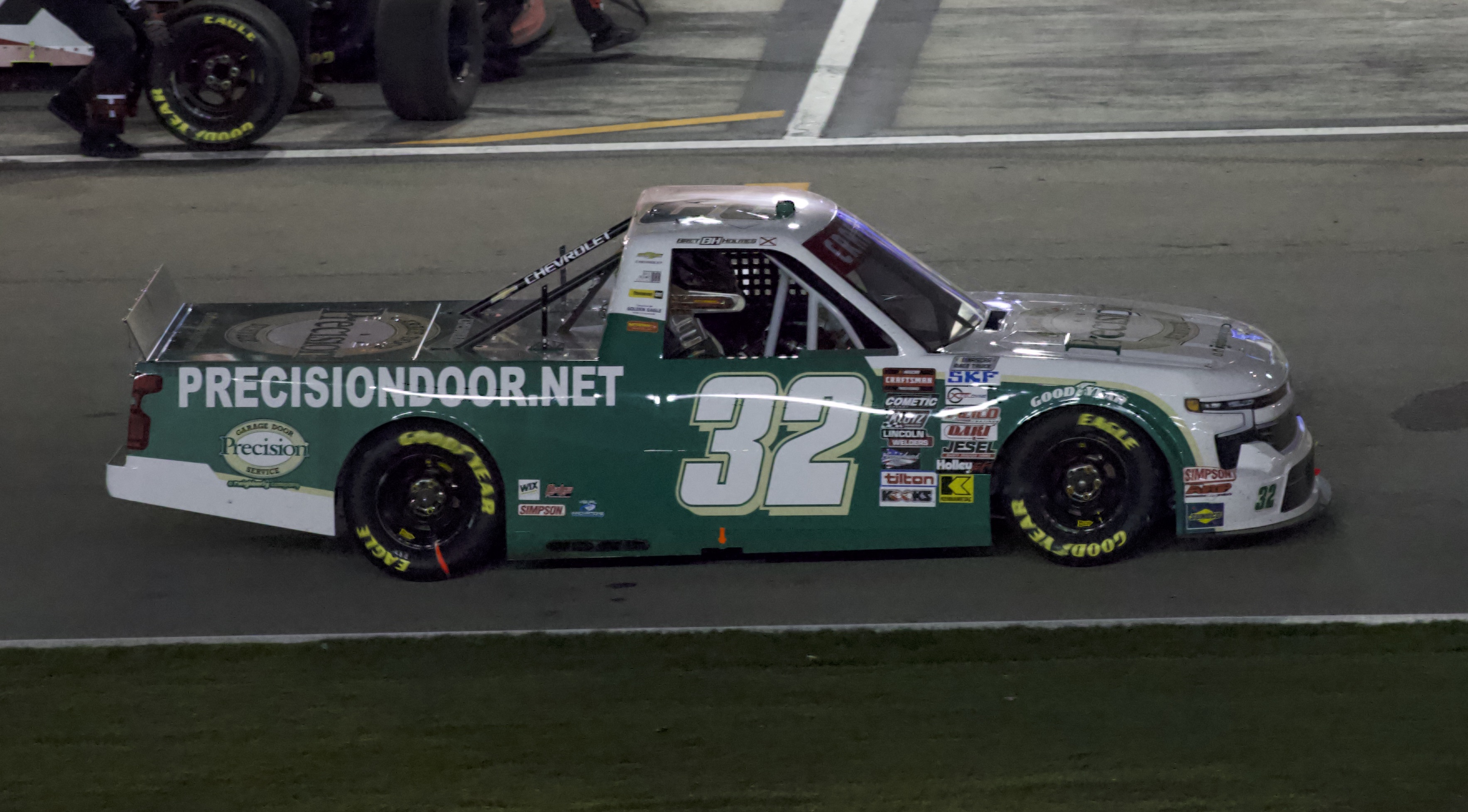
Bret Holmes in the No. 32 truck at Las Vegas Motor Speedway in 2024.

On July 31, 2020, Holmes told reporter Chris Knight that he was looking at debuting his team in the Truck Series for select races in 2021. On January 14, 2021, Holmes announced that he and Sam Mayer would run part-time schedules for his own team in the Truck Series, which would field the No. 32 truck. (The team chose the No. 32 as it is the No. 23 backwards, and the No. 23 was being used by GMS Racing in the Truck Series.) On March 6, 2021, it was revealed that the team had purchased the owner points of the No. 28 FDNY Racing truck, which attempted the season-opener at Daytona, in order to be more likely to qualify for races without qualifying if an entry list had over 40 trucks. Ty Dillon would drive the truck in the season-finale at Phoenix.

==== Truck No. 32 results ====
Year	Driver	No.	Make	1	2	3	4	5	6	7	8	9	10	11	12	13	14	15	16	17	18	19	20	21	22	23	NCTC	Pts
2021	Bret Holmes	32	Chevy	DAY	DAY	LVS; 37	ATL; 32	BRI		KAN; 27	DAR		CLT; 36	TEX	NSH; DNQ	POC	KNX					LVS; 11	TAL; 15	MAR; 22			35th	222
2021	Sam Mayer	32	Chevy						RCH; 9			COA; 6						GLN; 9	GTW	DAR	BRI; 22						35th	222
2021	Ty Dillon	32	Chevy																						PHO; 25		35th	222
2022	Bret Holmes	32	Chevy	DAY; 35	LVS; 8	ATL	COA	MAR; 24	BRI	DAR	KAN	TEX; 15	CLT	GTW	SON	KNO	NSH; DNQ				RCH; 15	KAN; 17		TAL; 3	HOM; 33	PHO	36th	157
2022	Connor Mosack	32	Chevy															MOH; 34	POC	IRP			BRI; 31				36th	157
2023	Bret Holmes	32	Chevy	DAY; 31	LVS; 34	ATL; 13	COA; 19	TEX; 23	BRD; 20	MAR; 22	KAN; 14	DAR; 23	NWS; 15	CLT; 21	GTW; 14	NSH; 34	MOH; 32	POC; 29	RCH; 29	IRP; 25	MLW; 19	KAN; 20	BRI; 27	TAL; 16	HOM	PHO	27th	303
2024	Bret Holmes	32	Chevy	DAY; 4	ATL; 11	LVS; 12	BRI; 31	COA; 29	MAR; 24	TEX; 22	KAN; 14	DAR; 17	NWS; 29	CLT; 14	GTW; 21	NSH; 36	POC; 12	IRP; 26	RCH; 21	MLW; 26	BRI; 13	KAN; 16	TAL; 9	HOM	MAR	PHO	23rd	388

=== ARCA Menards Series ===
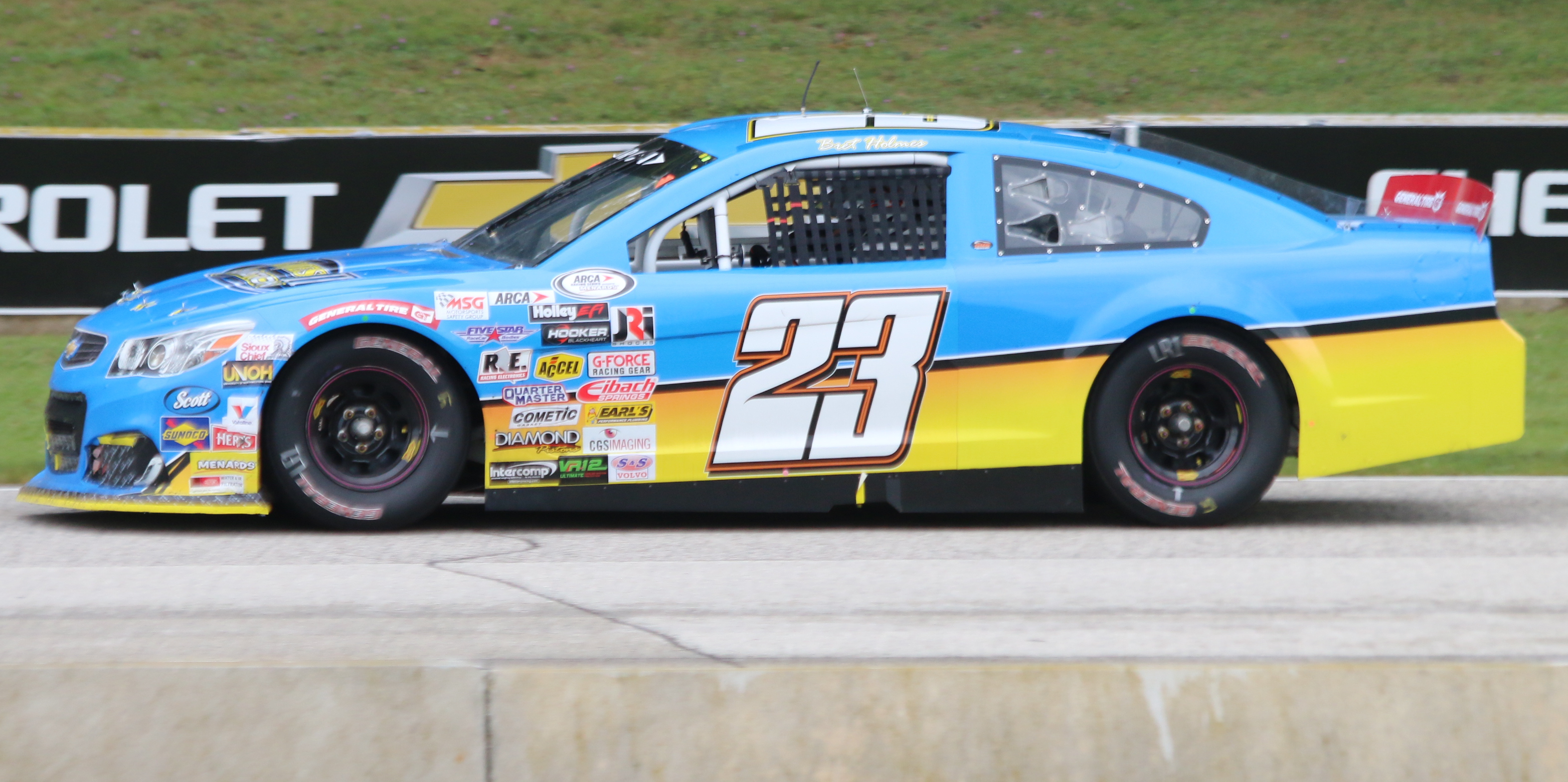
Holmes in the No. 23 at Road America in 2017

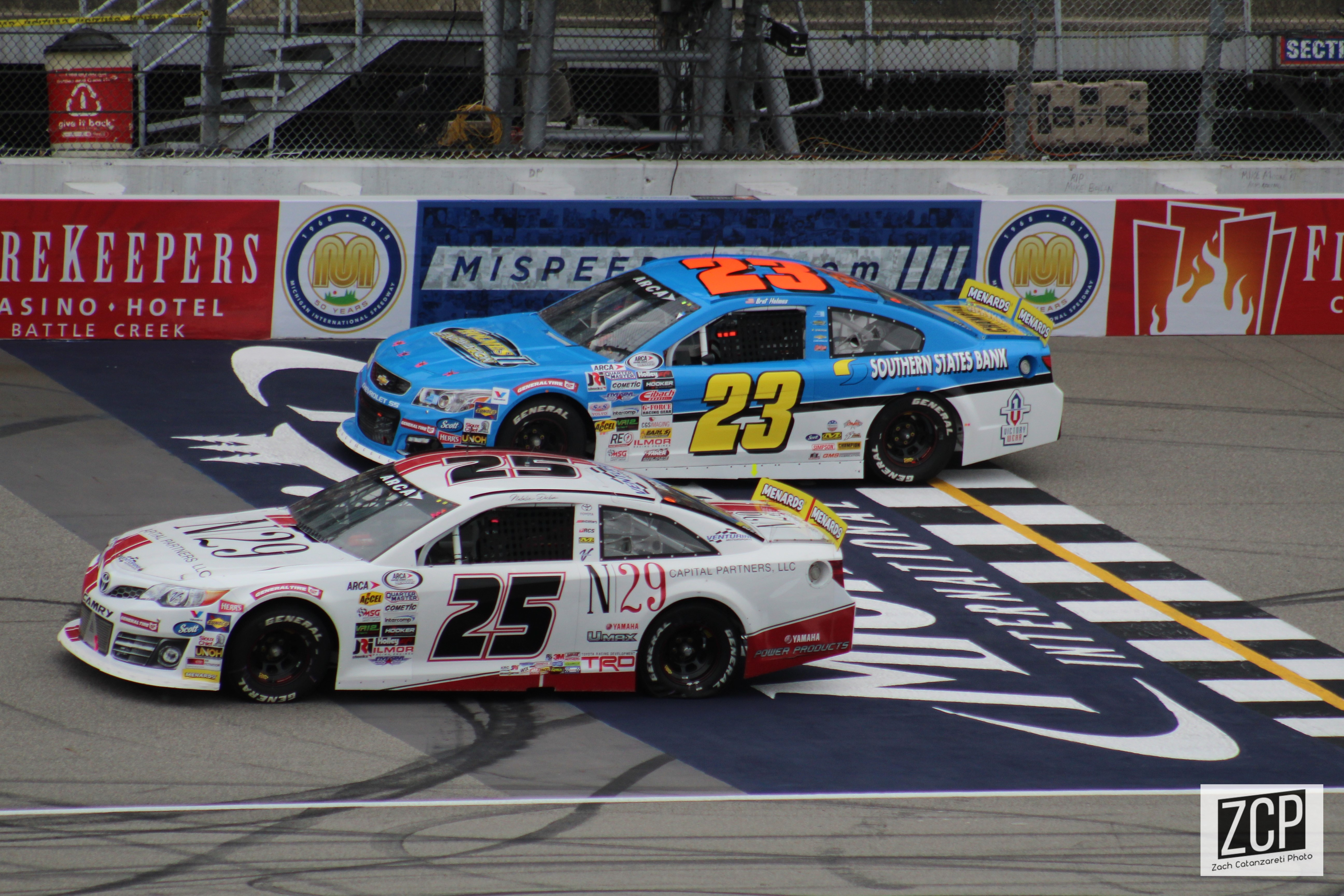
Holmes racing Natalie Decker (No. 25) at Michigan in 2018

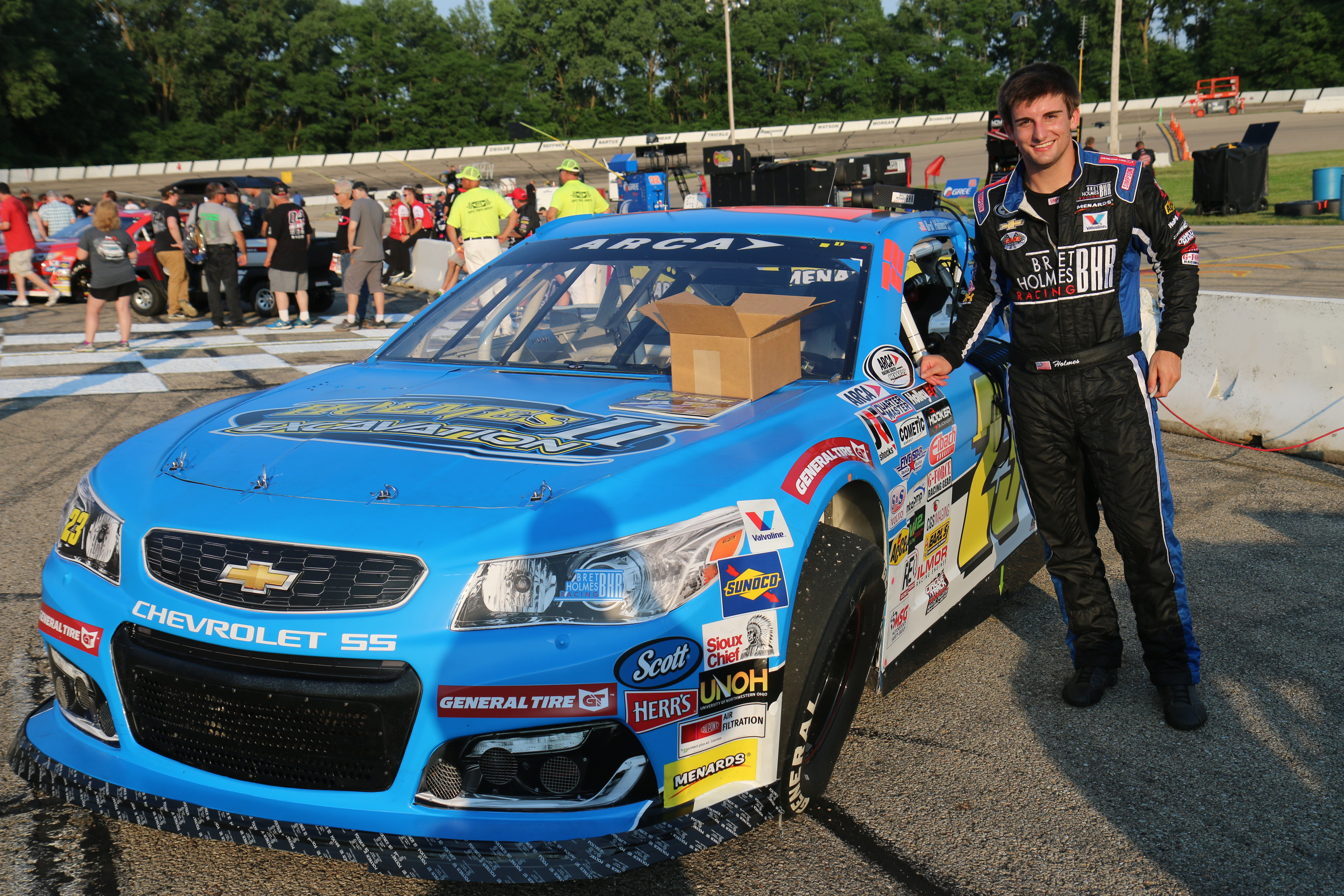
Holmes standing next to his No. 23 car before the race at Madison in 2018

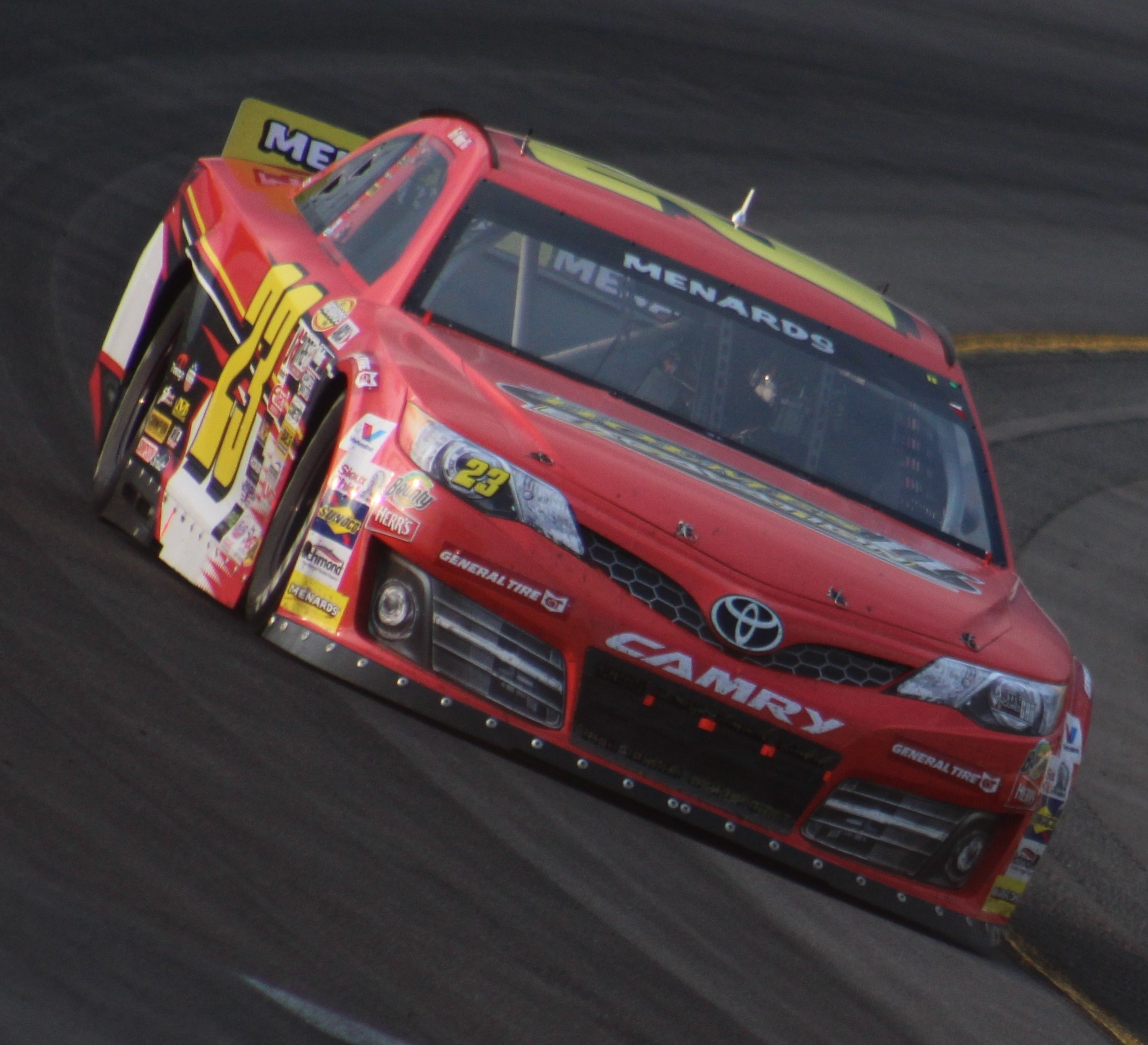
Holmes' No. 23 at Pocono in 2019. The car was a Toyota in this race.

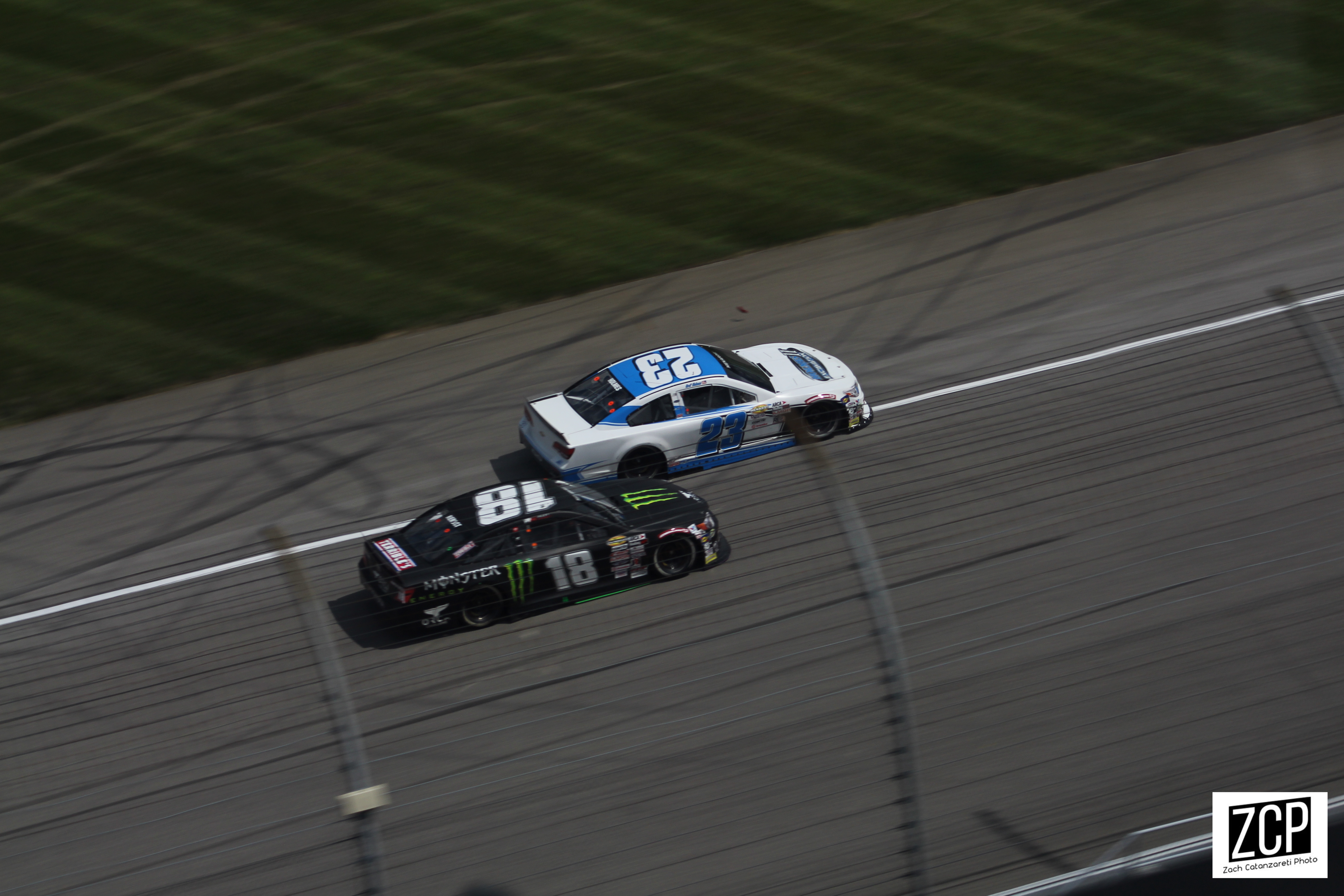
Holmes racing Riley Herbst (No. 18) at Kansas in July 2020. Holmes would go on to win this race.

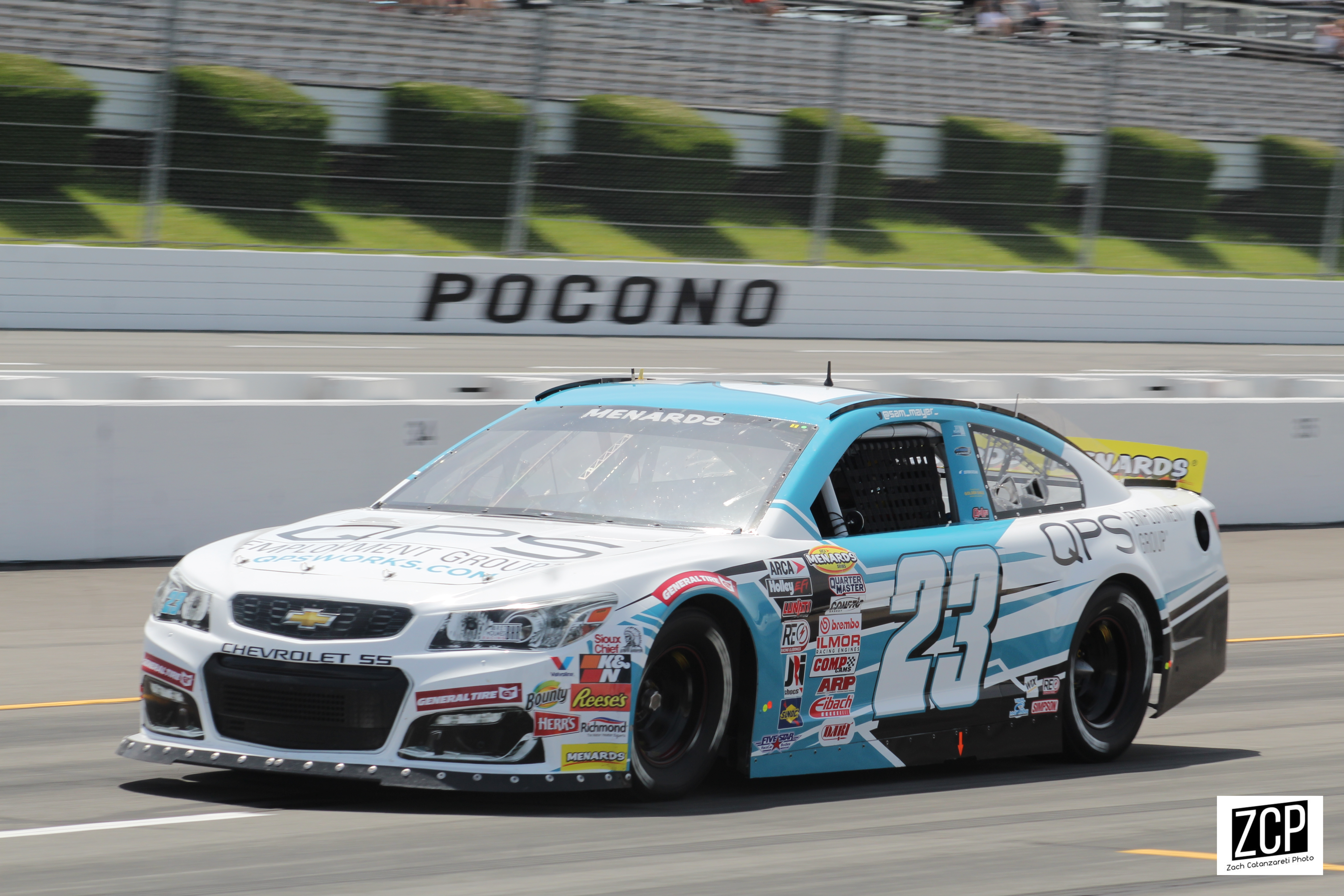
Sam Mayer driving down pit road in the No. 23 at Pocono in 2021

After GMS Racing closed down their ARCA team after the 2015 season to focus on expanding their Truck Series team in 2016, driver Bret Holmes, who was going to start the season with Empire Racing, and his father Stacy Holmes purchased the team's assets and ran part-time in the series in 2016. Their debut came in the race at the Nashville Fairgrounds Speedway. The GMS No. 23 had won the 2015 championship with Grant Enfinger driving. Enfinger had moved up to the Truck Series with GMS in 2016, driving part-time for the team in their No. 24 and No. 33 trucks. Enfinger would become a driver coach and crew chief for Holmes' ARCA team and would also drive the car in one race, which was at Pocono and he would win that race, giving the team a win in its first season.

BHR would field the No. 23 full-time in 2017 with Holmes driving, and although he did not win any races, he finished sixth in the standings. In 2018, Holmes and his team intended on running full-time again. However, halfway through the season, the team did not run any races except for the second Pocono race due to lack of sponsorship, although Wayne Peterson Racing used the team's car number in two races to keep collecting owner points for the No. 23 in case sponsorship was found and the team could compete again. Holmes would drive Ken Schrader Racing's No. 52 car in three of the final ten races of the season. BHR returned full-time in 2019, and Holmes finished third in the standings although he did not win any races.

In 2020, Holmes won his first race in the series at Kansas in July. He went on to win the championship despite his team having older equipment and struggling to find sponsorship, narrowly beating Michael Self, who drove a fully sponsored car for the powerhouse Venturini Motorsports team.

In 2021, the No. 23 car only ran part-time with Holmes driving it in four races and JR Motorsports Xfinity Series driver Sam Mayer (also a former GMS ARCA and Truck Series driver) driving it in five races.

==== Car No. 23 results ====
Year	Driver	No.	Make	1	2	3	4	5	6	7	8	9	10	11	12	13	14	15	16	17	18	19	20	AMSC	Pts
2016	Bret Holmes	23	Chevy	DAY	NSH; 5	SLM	TAL; 9	TOL	NJE	POC	MCH	MAD	WIN	IOW	IRP; 6		BLN; 4	ISF	DSF	SLM; 3	CHI	KEN; 7	KAN; 26		
2016	Grant Enfinger	23	Chevy													POC; 1									
2017	Bret Holmes	23	Chevy	DAY; 6	NSH; 13	SLM; 7	TAL; 22	TOL; 24	ELK; 4	POC; 14	MCH; 4	MAD; 7	IOW; 9	IRP; 8	POC; 14	WIN; 8	ISF; 20	ROA; 10	DSF; 12	SLM; 7	CHI; 10	KEN; 21	KAN; 10		
2018	Bret Holmes	23	Chevy	DAY; 24	NSH; 10	SLM; 13	TAL; 27	TOL; 5	CLT; 7	POC; 13	MCH; 20	MAD; 7	GTW; 10	CHI	IOW	ELK	POC; 10	ISF	BLN	DSF	SLM	IRP	KAN		
2019	Bret Holmes	23	Chevy	DAY; 18	FIF; 6	SLM; 10	TAL; 14	NSH; 5	TOL; 7	CLT; 8		MCH; 3	MAD; 5		CHI; 3	ELK; 9	IOW; 8	POC; 7	ISF; 3	DSF; 9			KAN; 4		
2019	Bret Holmes	23	Toyota								POC; 5			GTW; 10							SLM; 4	IRP; 8			
2020	Bret Holmes	23	Chevy	DAY; 9		TAL; 3	POC; 4	IRP; 7	KEN; 2	IOW; 3	KAN; 1*	TOL; 4	TOL; 3	MCH; 2*		GTW; 6	I44; 2	TOL; 4	BRI; 8	WIN; 3	MEM; 3*	ISF; 3	KAN; 2	2nd	1003
2020	Bret Holmes	23	Toyota		PHO; 15																			2nd	1003
2020	Bret Holmes	23	Ford												DRC; 8									2nd	1003
2021	Bret Holmes	23	Chevy	DAY; 3	PHO	TAL; 5*	KAN; 19	TOL	CLT	MOH				IOW; 10	WIN									19th	290
2021	Sam Mayer	23	Chevy								POC; 22	ELK	BLN			GLN; 14	MCH; 4	ISF	MLW; 2	DSF	BRI; 29	SLM	KAN	19th	290
2022	Connor Mosack	23	Chevy	DAY	PHO; 10		KAN; 5	CLT; 4	IOW; 3	BLN	ELK	MOH	POC; 6	IRP; 5		GLN; 16	ISF	MLW	DSF	KAN	BRI; 9	SLM	TOL	19th	376
2022	Bret Holmes	23	Chevy			TAL; 2									MCH; 7									19th	376
2023	Bret Holmes	23	Chevy	DAY	PHO	TAL; 3	KAN	CLT	BLN	ELK	MOH	IOW	POC	MCH	IRP	GLN	ISF	MLW	DSF	KAN	BRI	SLM	TOL	52nd	41
