= 2021 Clean Harbors 100 at The Glen =

Race details
- Race 13 of 20 of the 2021 ARCA Menards Series; Race 7 of 10 of the 2021 Sioux Chief Showdown
- Date: August 6, 2021
- Official name: 21st Annual Clean Harbors 100 at The Glen
- Location: Watkins Glen, New York, Watkins Glen International
- Course: Permanent racing facility
- Course length: 2.45 miles (3.94 km)
- Distance: 41 laps, 100.4 mi (161.578 km)
- Scheduled distance: 41 laps, 100.4 mi (161.578 km)
- Average speed: 91.968 miles per hour (148.008 km/h)

Pole position
Driver	Ty Gibbs	Joe Gibbs Racing
- Time: 1:13.651

Most laps led
Driver	Corey Heim	Venturini Motorsports
- Laps: 18

Winner
No. 20	Corey Heim	Venturini Motorsports

Television in the United States
- Network: Fox Sports 1
- Announcers: Jamie Little, Phil Parsons, Trevor Bayne

Radio in the United States
- Radio: Motor Racing Network

The 2021 Clean Harbors 100 at The Glen was the 13th stock car race of the 2021 ARCA Menards Series season, the seventh race of the 2021 Sioux Chief Showdown, and the 21st iteration of the event. The race was held on Friday, August 6, 2021, in Watkins Glen, New York at Watkins Glen International, a 2.45-mile (3.94 km) permanent road course. The race took the scheduled 41 laps to complete. At race's end, Corey Heim of Venturini Motorsports would take control in the later half of the race to win his sixth career ARCA Menards Series win and his fifth of the season. To fill out the podium, Austin Hill of Hattori Racing Enterprises and Ty Gibbs of Joe Gibbs Racing would finish second and third, respectively.

== Background ==
Watkins Glen International (nicknamed "The Glen") is an automobile race track located in Watkins Glen, New York at the southern tip of Seneca Lake. It was long known around the world as the home of the Formula One United States Grand Prix, which it hosted for twenty consecutive years (1961–1980), but the site has been home to road racing of nearly every class, including the World Sportscar Championship, Trans-Am, Can-Am, NASCAR Sprint Cup Series, the International Motor Sports Association and the IndyCar Series.

Initially, public roads in the village were used for the race course. In 1956 a permanent circuit for the race was built. In 1968 the race was extended to six hours, becoming the 6 Hours of Watkins Glen. The circuit's current layout has more or less been the same since 1971, although a chicane was installed at the uphill Esses in 1975 to slow cars through these corners, where there was a fatality during practice at the 1973 United States Grand Prix. The chicane was removed in 1985, but another chicane called the "Inner Loop" was installed in 1992 after J.D. McDuffie's fatal accident during the previous year's NASCAR Winston Cup event.

The circuit is known as the Mecca of North American road racing and is a very popular venue among fans and drivers. The facility is currently owned by International Speedway Corporation.

=== Entry list ===
#	Driver	Team	Make	Sponsor
1	Austin Hill	Hattori Racing Enterprises	Toyota	ARCO National Construction
01	D. L. Wilson	Fast Track Racing	Toyota	Council Cup Campground, Evergreen Raceway
2	Nick Sanchez	Rev Racing	Chevrolet	Castle Pack's Power, Max Siegel Incorporated
3	Dale Quarterley	Mullins Racing	Chevrolet	Van Dyk Recycling Solutions
10	Arnout Kok	Fast Track Racing	Toyota	American Blast Systems, Wild Mike's Ultimate Pizza, South Africa "Inspiring new ways"
11	Ed Pompa	Fast Track Racing	Toyota	Hytorc of New York, Double "H" Ranch
12	Tony Cosentino	Fast Track Racing	Toyota	Fast Track Racing
14	Chase Briscoe	Stewart-Haas Racing	Ford	Parker Offshore, Huffy
15	Drew Dollar	Venturini Motorsports	Toyota	Sunbelt Rentals
17	Taylor Gray	David Gilliland Racing	Ford	Ripper Coffee Company
18	Ty Gibbs	Joe Gibbs Racing	Toyota	Joe Gibbs Racing
20	Corey Heim	Venturini Motorsports	Toyota	JBL
21	Jack Wood	GMS Racing	Chevrolet	Chevrolet Accessories
23	Sam Mayer	Bret Holmes Racing	Chevrolet	QPS Employment Group
25	Brandon Jones	Venturini Motorsports	Toyota	Magickwoods Vanities
27	Tim Richmond	Richmond Clubb Motorsports	Toyota	Immigration Legal Center
28	Kyle Sieg	RSS Racing	Chevrolet	Lotze Insulation Design
30	Kris Wright	Rette Jones Racing	Ford	Wright Automotive Group
32	Austin Wayne Self	AM Racing	Chevrolet	Janitronics, Airbox Air Purifiers "Clean Air. Pure & Simple."
42	Tyler Ankrum	Cook-Finley Racing	Chevrolet	LiUNA!
46	Thad Moffitt	David Gilliland Racing	Ford	Clean Harbors
48	Brad Smith	Brad Smith Motorsports	Chevrolet	Henshaw Automation
50	Carson Hocevar	Niece Motorsports	Chevrolet	GMPartsNow, Scott's Sports Cards, Coins, & Jewelry
54	Riley Herbst	David Gilliland Racing	Ford	Dixie Vodka Tony's Tea
60	Brad Perez	Josh Williams Motorsports	Chevrolet	Rackley Roofing
63	Chase Purdy*	Spraker Racing Enterprises	Chevrolet	Bama Buggies
69	Russ Lane	Kimmel Racing	Ford	National Auto Sport Association Central Region
73	Andy Jankowiak	Jankowiak Motorsports	Chevrolet	Phillips 66, Dak's Market
74	Chris Werth	Visconti Motorsports	Ford	Otto Motorsports, Accede Mold & Tool
77	Ed Bull	Bull Racing	Ford	Bayside Chiropractic
Official entry list

*Withdrew due to Purdy contracting COVID-19.

== Practice/Qualifying ==
Practice and qualifying would be combined for the event. The session would take place on Friday, August 6, at 3:15 p.m. EST. Each driver would have 45 minutes to run their fastest lap. Ty Gibbs of Joe Gibbs Racing would win the pole, with a lap of 1:13.651 and an average speed of 119.754 miles per hour (192.725 km/h).

=== Full qualifying results ===
Pos.	#	Driver	Team	Make	Time	Speed
1	18	Ty Gibbs	Joe Gibbs Racing	Toyota	1:13.651	119.754
2	20	Corey Heim	Venturini Motorsports	Toyota	1:14.538	118.329
3	1	Austin Hill	Hattori Racing Enterprises	Toyota	1:14.969	117.649
4	50	Carson Hocevar	Niece Motorsports	Chevrolet	1:15.168	117.337
5	23	Sam Mayer	Bret Holmes Racing	Chevrolet	1:15.410	116.961
6	25	Brandon Jones	Venturini Motorsports	Toyota	1:15.577	116.702
7	14	Chase Briscoe	Stewart-Haas Racing	Ford	1:15.699	116.514
8	30	Kris Wright	Rette Jones Racing	Ford	1:16.094	115.909
9	2	Nick Sanchez	Rev Racing	Chevrolet	1:16.264	115.651
10	42	Tyler Ankrum	Cook-Finley Racing	Chevrolet	1:16.557	115.208
11	54	Riley Herbst	David Gilliland Racing	Ford	1:16.624	115.108
12	17	Taylor Gray	David Gilliland Racing	Ford	1:16.819	114.815
13	21	Jack Wood	GMS Racing	Chevrolet	1:17.257	114.164
14	32	Austin Wayne Self	AM Racing	Chevrolet	1:17.450	113.880
15	46	Thad Moffitt	David Gilliland Racing	Ford	1:17.817	113.343
16	15	Drew Dollar	Venturini Motorsports	Toyota	1:18.105	112.925
17	3	Dale Quarterley	Mullins Racing	Chevrolet	1:18.422	112.468
18	28	Kyle Sieg	RSS Racing	Chevrolet	1:19.279	111.253
19	10	Arnout Kok	Fast Track Racing	Toyota	1:20.953	108.952
20	74	Chris Werth	Visconti Motorsports	Ford	1:21.095	108.761
21	27	Tim Richmond	Richmond Clubb Motorsports	Toyota	1:21.676	107.988
22	69	Russ Lane	Kimmel Racing	Ford	1:22.039	107.510
23	11	Ed Pompa	Fast Track Racing	Toyota	1:23.961	105.049
24	60	Brad Perez	Josh Williams Motorsports	Chevrolet	1:36.974	90.952
25	01	D. L. Wilson	Fast Track Racing	Toyota	1:42.055	86.424
26	48	Brad Smith	Brad Smith Motorsports	Chevrolet	1:42.939	85.682
27	73	Andy Jankowiak	Jankowiak Motorsports	Chevrolet	5:09.040	28.540
28	77	Ed Bull	Bull Racing	Ford	—	—
29	12	Tony Cosentino	Fast Track Racing	Toyota	—	—
Official qualifying results

== Race results ==
Fin	St	#	Driver	Team	Make	Laps	Led	Status	Pts
1	2	20	Corey Heim	Venturini Motorsports	Toyota	41	18	running	48
2	3	1	Austin Hill	Hattori Racing Enterprises	Toyota	41	0	running	42
3	1	18	Ty Gibbs	Joe Gibbs Racing	Toyota	41	14	running	43
4	4	50	Carson Hocevar	Niece Motorsports	Chevrolet	41	0	running	40
5	6	25	Brandon Jones	Venturini Motorsports	Toyota	41	0	running	39
6	11	54	Riley Herbst	David Gilliland Racing	Ford	41	0	running	38
7	12	17	Taylor Gray	David Gilliland Racing	Ford	41	0	running	37
8	9	2	Nick Sanchez	Rev Racing	Chevrolet	41	0	running	36
9	14	32	Austin Wayne Self	AM Racing	Chevrolet	41	0	running	35
10	13	21	Jack Wood	GMS Racing	Chevrolet	41	0	running	34
11	15	46	Thad Moffitt	David Gilliland Racing	Ford	41	0	running	33
12	18	28	Kyle Sieg	RSS Racing	Chevrolet	41	0	running	32
13	8	30	Kris Wright	Rette Jones Racing	Ford	41	0	running	31
14	5	23	Sam Mayer	Bret Holmes Racing	Chevrolet	40	0	running	30
15	16	15	Drew Dollar	Venturini Motorsports	Toyota	40	0	running	29
16	27	73	Andy Jankowiak	Jankowiak Motorsports	Chevrolet	39	0	running	28
17	21	27	Tim Richmond	Richmond Clubb Motorsports	Toyota	39	0	running	27
18	23	11	Ed Pompa	Fast Track Racing	Toyota	39	0	running	26
19	19	10	Arnout Kok	Fast Track Racing	Toyota	39	0	running	25
20	20	74	Chris Werth	Visconti Motorsports	Ford	39	0	running	24
21	22	69	Russ Lane	Kimmel Racing	Ford	37	0	running	23
22	10	42	Tyler Ankrum	Cook-Finley Racing	Chevrolet	30	0	running	22
23	7	14	Chase Briscoe	Stewart-Haas Racing	Ford	25	9	suspension	22
24	24	60	Brad Perez	Josh Williams Motorsports	Chevrolet	25	0	running	20
25	17	3	Dale Quarterley	Mullins Racing	Chevrolet	15	0	accident	19
26	29	12	Tony Cosentino	Fast Track Racing	Toyota	8	0	rear gear	18
27	25	01	D. L. Wilson	Fast Track Racing	Toyota	4	0	brakes	17
28	26	48	Brad Smith	Brad Smith Motorsports	Chevrolet	2	0	brakes	16
29	28	77	Ed Bull	Bull Racing	Ford	0	0	did not start	3
Withdrew
WD		63	Chase Purdy	Spraker Racing Enterprises	Chevrolet				
Official race results

Previous race: 2021 Calypso Lemonade 200	ARCA Menards Series; 2021 season	Next race: 2021 Henry Ford Health System 200
