= 2020 General Tire 100 =

Race details
- Race 12 of 20 of the 2020 ARCA Menards Series; Race 6 of 10 of the 2020 Sioux Chief Showdown
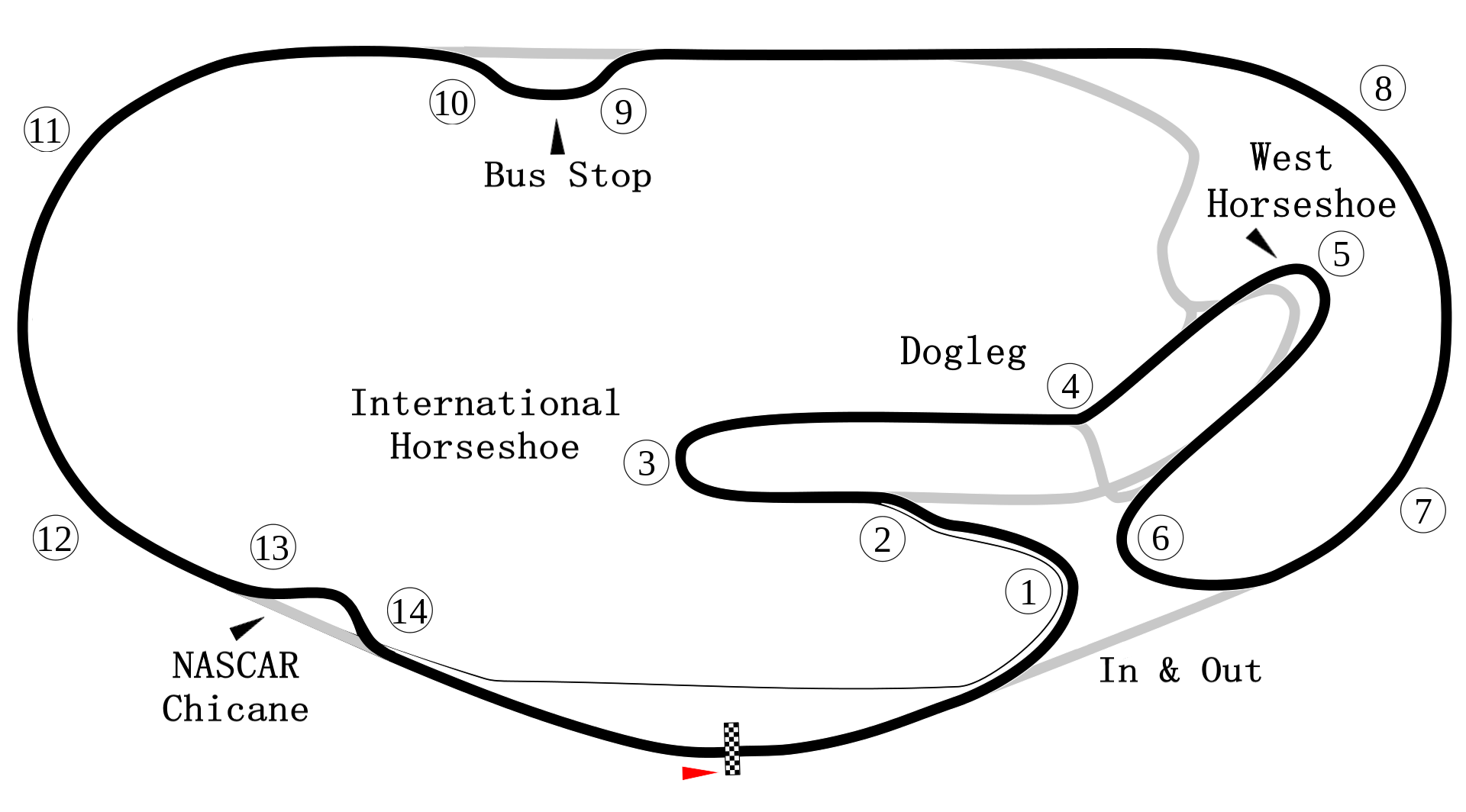
- Date: August 14, 2020
- Official name: Inaugural General Tire 100
- Location: Daytona Beach, Florida, Daytona International Speedway road course
- Course: Permanent racing facility
- Course length: 3.61 miles (5.81 km)
- Distance: 28 laps, 101.1 mi (162.704 km)
- Scheduled distance: 28 laps, 101.1 mi (162.704 km)
- Average speed: 79.625 miles per hour (128.144 km/h)

Pole position
Driver	Chandler Smith	Venturini Motorsports
- Time: Set by 2020 Sioux Chief Showdown owner's points

Most laps led
Driver	Ty Gibbs	Joe Gibbs Racing
- Laps: 19

Winner
No. 25	Michael Self	Venturini Motorsports

Television in the United States
- Network: MAVTV
- Announcers: Bob Dillner, Jim Tretow

Radio in the United States
- Radio: Motor Racing Network

The 2020 General Tire 100 was the 12th stock car race of the 2020 ARCA Menards Series, the sixth race of the 2020 Sioux Chief Showdown, and the inaugural iteration of the event. The race was held on Friday, August 14, 2020, in Daytona Beach, Florida, at the Daytona International Speedway road course, a 3.61 miles (5.81 km) permanent road course that uses part of the Daytona oval and infield road course. The race took the scheduled 28 laps to complete. After hours of delay, Michael Self of Venturini Motorsports would control the late stages of the race to win his ninth and to date, final career ARCA Menards Series race, as well as his second and final of the season, completing a Daytona sweep. To fill out the podium, Ty Gibbs of Joe Gibbs Racing and Sam Mayer of GMS Racing would finish second and third, respectively.

== Background ==
=== Entry list ===
#	Driver	Team	Make	Sponsor
1	Max McLaughlin	Hattori Racing Enterprises	Toyota	Mohawk Northeast, Payton's Promise
4	Hailie Deegan	DGR-Crosley	Ford	Monster Energy
06	Con Nicolopoulos	Wayne Peterson Racing	Toyota	Wayne Peterson Racing
8	Russ Lane	Empire Racing	Ford	Make It Rain
10	Mike Basham	Fast Track Racing	Ford	Fast Track Racing
11	Tim Monroe	Fast Track Racing	Toyota	Fast Track Racing
12	Nick Igdalsky	Fast Track Racing	Toyota	Jacob Construction
15	Drew Dollar	Venturini Motorsports	Toyota	Sunbelt Rentals
17	Taylor Gray	DGR-Crosley	Ford	Place of Hope
17W	Will Rodgers	Steve McGowan Motorsports	Chevrolet	Madorom Camouflage
18	Ty Gibbs	Joe Gibbs Racing	Toyota	Monster Energy
20	Chandler Smith	Venturini Motorsports	Toyota	JBL
21	Sam Mayer	GMS Racing	Chevrolet	Kelly For Kids Foundation
22	Parker Chase	Chad Bryant Racing	Ford	Vertical Bridge
23	Bret Holmes	Bret Holmes Racing	Ford	Holmes II Excavating
25	Michael Self	Venturini Motorsports	Toyota	Sinclair
46	Thad Moffitt	DGR-Crosley	Ford	Performance Plus Motor Oil Richard Petty Signature Series
48	Brad Smith	Brad Smith Motorsports	Chevrolet	Henshaw Automation
57	Bryan Dauzat	Brother-In-Law Racing	Chevrolet	O.B. Builders Door & Trim
69	Will Kimmel	Kimmel Racing	Ford	Kimmel Racing
74	Ayrton Ori	Visconti Motorsports	Chevrolet	Spray Nine, Nextel
Official entry list

== Practice ==
The only 45-minute practice session was held on Friday, August 14. Will Rodgers of Steve McGowan Motorsports would set the fastest time in the session, with a lap of 2:07.226 and an average speed of 102.149 miles per hour (164.393 km/h).

Pos.	#	Driver	Team	Make	Time	Speed
1	17W	Will Rodgers	Steve McGowan Motorsports	Chevrolet	2:07.226	102.149
2	18	Ty Gibbs	Joe Gibbs Racing	Toyota	2:07.562	101.880
3	22	Parker Chase	Chad Bryant Racing	Ford	2:07.644	101.814
Full practice results

== Starting lineup ==
ARCA would not hold qualifying for the event, and would decide to determine the starting lineup based on the current 2020 Sioux Chief Showdown owner's standings. As a result, Chandler Smith of Venturini Motorsports would win the pole.

=== Full starting lineup ===
Pos.	#	Driver	Team	Make
1	20	Chandler Smith	Venturini Motorsports	Toyota
2	25	Michael Self	Venturini Motorsports	Toyota
3	21	Sam Mayer	GMS Racing	Chevrolet
4	17	Taylor Gray	DGR-Crosley	Ford
5	18	Ty Gibbs	Joe Gibbs Racing	Toyota
6	23	Bret Holmes	Bret Holmes Racing	Ford
7	4	Hailie Deegan	DGR-Crosley	Ford
8	22	Parker Chase	Chad Bryant Racing	Ford
9	46	Thad Moffitt	DGR-Crosley	Ford
10	15	Drew Dollar	Venturini Motorsports	Toyota
11	12	Nick Igdalsky	Fast Track Racing	Toyota
12	11	Tim Monroe	Fast Track Racing	Toyota
13	10	Mike Basham	Fast Track Racing	Ford
14	06	Con Nicolopoulos	Wayne Peterson Racing	Toyota
15	48	Brad Smith	Brad Smith Motorsports	Chevrolet
16	1	Max McLaughlin	Hattori Racing Enterprises	Toyota
17	74	Ayrton Ori	Visconti Motorsports	Chevrolet
18	69	Will Kimmel	Kimmel Racing	Ford
19	17W	Will Rodgers	Steve McGowan Motorsports	Chevrolet
20	8	Russ Lane	Empire Racing	Ford
21	57	Bryan Dauzat	Brother-In-Law Racing	Chevrolet
Official starting lineup

== Race results ==
Fin	St	#	Driver	Team	Make	Laps	Led	Status	Pts
1	2	25	Michael Self	Venturini Motorsports	Toyota	28	9	running	47
2	5	18	Ty Gibbs	Joe Gibbs Racing	Toyota	28	19	running	44
3	3	21	Sam Mayer	GMS Racing	Chevrolet	28	0	running	41
4	4	17	Taylor Gray	DGR-Crosley	Ford	28	0	running	40
5	19	17W	Will Rodgers	Steve McGowan Motorsports	Chevrolet	28	0	running	39
6	7	4	Hailie Deegan	DGR-Crosley	Ford	28	0	running	38
7	16	1	Max McLaughlin	Hattori Racing Enterprises	Toyota	28	0	running	37
8	6	23	Bret Holmes	Bret Holmes Racing	Ford	28	0	running	36
9	1	20	Chandler Smith	Venturini Motorsports	Toyota	28	0	running	35
10	8	22	Parker Chase	Chad Bryant Racing	Ford	28	0	running	34
11	9	46	Thad Moffitt	DGR-Crosley	Ford	28	0	running	33
12	10	15	Drew Dollar	Venturini Motorsports	Toyota	27	0	running	32
13	18	69	Will Kimmel	Kimmel Racing	Ford	27	0	running	31
14	11	12	Nick Igdalsky	Fast Track Racing	Toyota	27	0	running	30
15	13	10	Mike Basham	Fast Track Racing	Ford	26	0	running	29
16	20	8	Russ Lane	Empire Racing	Ford	26	0	running	28
17	17	74	Ayrton Ori	Visconti Motorsports	Chevrolet	26	0	running	27
18	14	06	Con Nicolopoulos	Wayne Peterson Racing	Toyota	3	0	overheating	26
19	15	48	Brad Smith	Brad Smith Motorsports	Chevrolet	1	0	transmission	25
20	12	11	Tim Monroe	Fast Track Racing	Toyota	0	0	electrical	24
21	21	57	Bryan Dauzat	Brother-In-Law Racing	Chevrolet	0	0	did not start	23
Withdrew
WD		54	?	DGR-Crosley	Ford				
Official race results

Previous race: 2020 VizCom 200	ARCA Menards Series; 2020 season	Next race: 2020 Dutch Boy 150
