= 2020 General Tire 125 =

Race details
- Race 3 of 6 of the 2020 ARCA Menards Series East
- Date: August 21, 2020
- Official name: 20th Annual General Tire 125
- Location: Dover, Delaware, Dover International Speedway
- Course: Permanent racing facility
- Course length: 1.6 km (1 miles)
- Distance: 125 laps, 125 mi (201.168 km)
- Scheduled distance: 125 laps, 125 mi (201.168 km)
- Average speed: 116.219 miles per hour (187.036 km/h)

Pole position
Driver	Ty Gibbs	Joe Gibbs Racing
- Time: 23.709

Most laps led
Driver	Ty Gibbs	Joe Gibbs Racing
- Laps: 104

Winner
No. 21	Sam Mayer	GMS Racing

Television in the United States
- Network: TrackPass
- Announcers: Charles Krall

Radio in the United States
- Radio: Motor Racing Network

The 2020 General Tire 125 was the third stock car race of the 2020 ARCA Menards Series East season and the 20th iteration of the event. The race was held on Friday, August 21, 2020, in Dover, Delaware at Dover International Speedway, a 1 mile (1.6 km) oval-shaped permanent racetrack. The race took the scheduled 125 laps to complete. At race's end, Sam Mayer of GMS Racing would hold off the field after he performed a bump and run on race dominator Ty Gibbs, earning his sixth career ARCA Menards Series East win and his second of the season. To fill out the podium, David Gilliland of DGR-Crosley and Mason Diaz of Venturini Motorsports would finish second and third, respectively.

== Background ==
Dover International Speedway is an oval race track in Dover, Delaware, United States that has held at least two NASCAR races since it opened in 1969. In addition to NASCAR, the track also hosted USAC and the NTT IndyCar Series. The track features one layout, a 1-mile (1.6 km) concrete oval, with 24° banking in the turns and 9° banking on the straights. The speedway is owned and operated by Dover Motorsports.

The track, nicknamed "The Monster Mile", was built in 1969 by Melvin Joseph of Melvin L. Joseph Construction Company, Inc., with an asphalt surface, but was replaced with concrete in 1995. Six years later in 2001, the track's capacity moved to 135,000 seats, making the track have the largest capacity of sports venue in the mid-Atlantic. In 2002, the name changed to Dover International Speedway from Dover Downs International Speedway after Dover Downs Gaming and Entertainment split, making Dover Motorsports. From 2007 to 2009, the speedway worked on an improvement project called "The Monster Makeover", which expanded facilities at the track and beautified the track. After the 2014 season, the track's capacity was reduced to 95,500 seats.

=== Entry list ===
#	Driver	Team	Make	Sponsor
1	Max McLaughlin	Hattori Racing Enterprises	Toyota	Toyota Racing Development
4	Chase Cabre	Rev Racing	Toyota	Eibach, Max Siegel Incorporated
6	Nick Sanchez	Rev Racing	Toyota	Universal Technical Institute, NASCAR Technical Institute
10	Tommy Vigh Jr.	Fast Track Racing	Ford	Fast Track Racing
11	Ed Pompa	Fast Track Racing	Toyota	Green Renewable Inc., Double "H" Ranch
15	Drew Dollar	Venturini Motorsports	Toyota	Sunbelt Rentals
17	Taylor Gray	DGR-Crosley	Ford	Ford Performance
18	Ty Gibbs	Joe Gibbs Racing	Toyota	Monster Energy
20	Corey Heim	Venturini Motorsports	Toyota	Craftsman
21	Sam Mayer	GMS Racing	Chevrolet	Vince Lombardi Cancer Foundation
25	Mason Diaz	Venturini Motorsports	Toyota	Drydene
41	Kyle Sieg	RSS Racing	Chevrolet	Independent Strapping
42	Parker Retzlaff	Cook-Finley Racing	Toyota	Ponsse, Ironhorse Loggers
54	David Gilliland	DGR-Crosley	Ford	Frontline Enterprises
74	Joe Graf Jr.	Visconti Motorsports	Chevrolet	Bucked Up Energy
87	Chuck Buchanan Jr.	Charles Buchanan Racing	Ford	Spring Drug
91	Justin Carroll	TC Motorsports	Toyota	Carroll's Automotive
97	Jason Kitzmiller	CR7 Motorsports	Chevrolet	A. L. L. Construction
Official entry list

== Qualifying ==
Qualifying was held on Friday, August 21, at 11:30 AM EST. Each driver would have two laps to set a fastest time; the fastest of the two would count as their official qualifying lap.

Ty Gibbs of Joe Gibbs Racing would win the pole, setting a time of 23.709 and an average speed of 151.841 miles per hour (244.364 km/h).

=== Full qualifying results ===
Pos.	#	Driver	Team	Make	Time	Speed
1	18	Ty Gibbs	Joe Gibbs Racing	Toyota	23.709	151.841
2	21	Sam Mayer	GMS Racing	Chevrolet	23.788	151.337
3	54	David Gilliland	DGR-Crosley	Ford	23.863	150.861
4	20	Corey Heim	Venturini Motorsports	Toyota	24.045	149.719
5	17	Taylor Gray	DGR-Crosley	Ford	24.063	149.607
6	1	Max McLaughlin	Hattori Racing Enterprises	Toyota	24.091	149.433
7	15	Drew Dollar	Venturini Motorsports	Toyota	24.115	149.285
8	25	Mason Diaz	Venturini Motorsports	Toyota	24.279	148.276
9	4	Chase Cabre	Rev Racing	Toyota	24.393	147.583
10	6	Nick Sanchez	Rev Racing	Toyota	24.538	146.711
11	42	Parker Retzlaff	Cook-Finley Racing	Toyota	24.817	145.062
12	91	Justin Carroll	TC Motorsports	Toyota	25.009	143.948
13	41	Kyle Sieg	RSS Racing	Chevrolet	25.205	142.829
14	74	Joe Graf Jr.	Visconti Motorsports	Chevrolet	25.881	139.098
15	97	Jason Kitzmiller	CR7 Motorsports	Chevrolet	26.809	134.283
16	87	Chuck Buchanan Jr.	Charles Buchanan Racing	Ford	26.976	133.452
17	10	Tommy Vigh Jr.	Fast Track Racing	Ford	27.580	130.529
18	11	Ed Pompa	Fast Track Racing	Toyota	28.123	128.009
Official qualifying results

== Race results ==
Fin	St	#	Driver	Team	Make	Laps	Led	Status	Pts
1	2	21	Sam Mayer	GMS Racing	Chevrolet	125	21	running	47
2	3	54	David Gilliland	DGR-Crosley	Ford	125	0	running	42
3	8	25	Mason Diaz	Venturini Motorsports	Toyota	125	0	running	41
4	6	1	Max McLaughlin	Hattori Racing Enterprises	Toyota	125	0	running	40
5	7	15	Drew Dollar	Venturini Motorsports	Toyota	125	0	running	39
6	4	20	Corey Heim	Venturini Motorsports	Toyota	125	0	running	38
7	11	42	Parker Retzlaff	Cook-Finley Racing	Toyota	125	0	running	37
8	9	4	Chase Cabre	Rev Racing	Toyota	125	0	running	36
9	5	17	Taylor Gray	DGR-Crosley	Ford	125	0	running	35
10	16	87	Chuck Buchanan Jr.	Charles Buchanan Racing	Ford	116	0	running	34
11	13	41	Kyle Sieg	RSS Racing	Chevrolet	116	0	running	33
12	1	18	Ty Gibbs	Joe Gibbs Racing	Toyota	110	104	crash	35
13	18	11	Ed Pompa	Fast Track Racing	Toyota	66	0	running	31
14	12	91	Justin Carroll	TC Motorsports	Toyota	26	0	mechanical	30
15	17	10	Tommy Vigh Jr.	Fast Track Racing	Ford	19	0	electrical	29
16	10	6	Nick Sanchez	Rev Racing	Toyota	13	0	mechanical	28
17	14	74	Joe Graf Jr.	Visconti Motorsports	Chevrolet	12	0	mechanical	27
18	15	97	Jason Kitzmiller	CR7 Motorsports	Chevrolet	0	0	did not start	3
Official race results

Previous race: 2020 Herr's Potato Chips 200	ARCA Menards Series East; 2020 season	Next race: 2020 Royal Truck & Trailer 200
