= Russ Lane =

American professional stock car driver

- Born: September 21, 1996 (age 30) Overland Park, Kansas, U.S.

ARCA Menards Series career
- Debut season: 2020
- Current team: Kimmel Racing
- Car number: 69
- Former teams: Empire Racing (2020)
- Starts: 5
- Championships: 0
- Wins: 0
- Podiums: 0
- Poles: 0
- Statistics up to date as of February 20, 2022.

Russ Lane (born September 21, 1996) is an American professional stock car racing driver. He last competed part-time in the ARCA Menards Series, driving the No. 69 for Kimmel Racing.

== Racing career ==
=== National Auto Sport Association ===
At the age of eighteen, he would first race in the National Auto Sport Association, driving a Ford Mustang. He would win the American Iron division in 2019.

=== ARCA Menards Series ===
With help of Toyota Racing Development employee Jack Irving, Lane was able to buy a car from Venturini Motorsports to race in a future ARCA Menards Series race. While looking for a location to store the car, Empire Racing would offer Lane a mechanic job for the team. He would first make his debut at the 2020 General Tire #AnywhereIsPossible 200, retiring in seventeenth due to a busted oil line. He would then suffer a crash at the 2020 Dutch Boy 150, finishing last in eighteenth. He would then get a new car for the 2020 General Tire 100, finishing sixteenth.

Lane would race two races in 2021 for Kimmel Racing, finishing eleventh and 21st in the first and second races he raced, respectively.

== Motorsports career results ==
=== ARCA Menards Series ===
(key) (Bold – Pole position awarded by qualifying time. Italics – Pole position earned by points standings or practice time. * – Most laps led.)

ARCA Menards Series results
Year	Team	No.	Make	1	2	3	4	5	6	7	8	9	10	11	12	13	14	15	16	17	18	19	20	AMSC	Pts	Ref
2020	Empire Racing	8	Toyota	DAY	PHO	TAL	POC; 17	IRP	KEN	IOW	KAN; 18	TOL	TOL	MCH										40th	81	
2020	Empire Racing	8	Ford												DAY; 16	GTW	L44	TOL	BRI	WIN	MEM	ISF	KAN	40th	81	
2021	Kimmel Racing	69	Ford	DAY	PHO	TAL	KAN	TOL	CLT	MOH; 11	POC	ELK	BLN	IOW	WIN	GLN; 21	MCH	ISF	MLW	DSF	BRI	SLM	KAN	65th	56	
