= Will Kimmel =

American racing driver (born 1988)

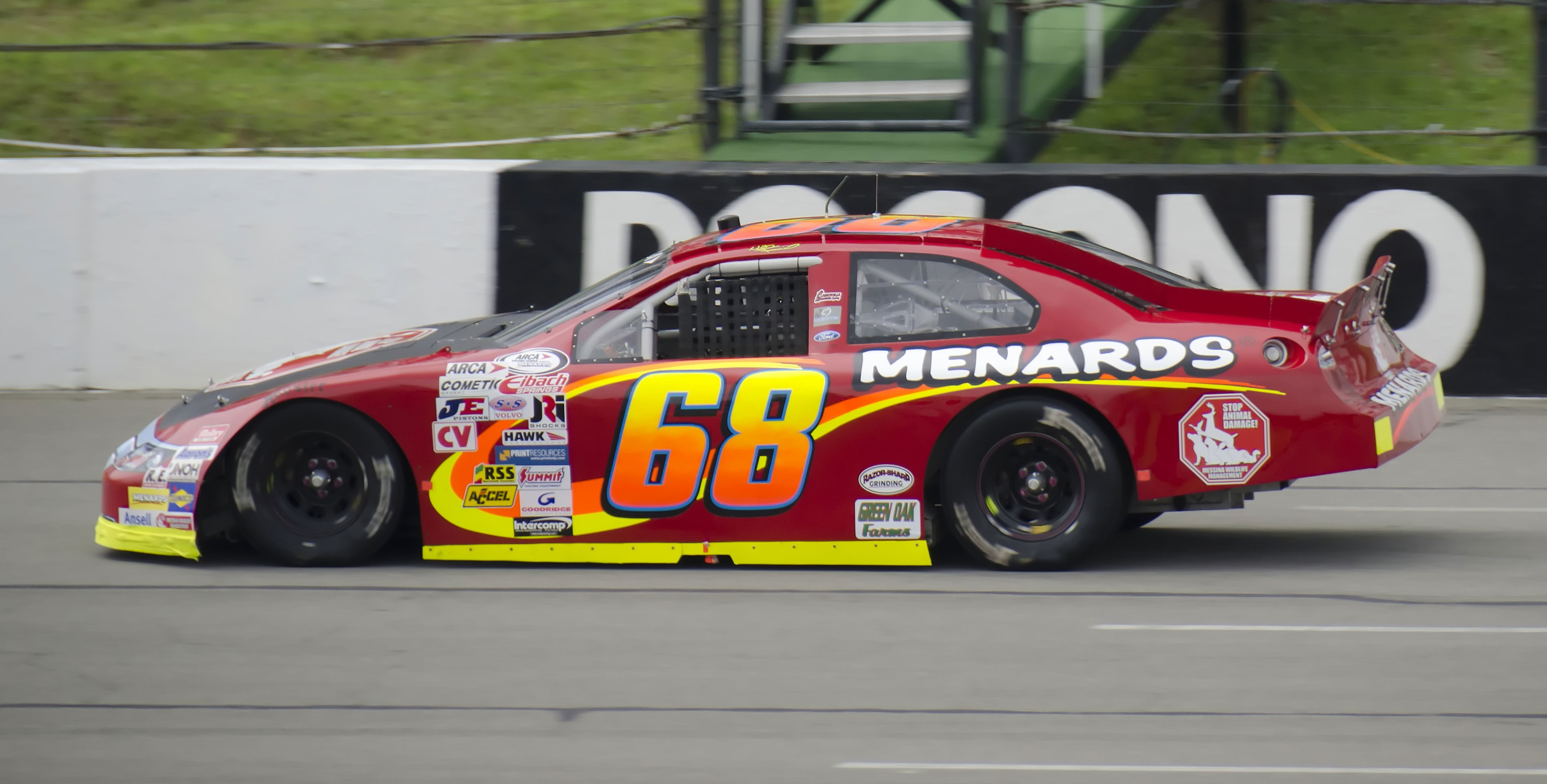
- Kimmel in the ARCA race at Pocono Raceway in August 2011
- Born: May 11, 1988 (age 38); Sellersburg, Indiana, U.S.

NASCAR Cup Series career
- 2 races run over 1 year
- 2015 position: 46th
- Best finish: 46th (2015)
- First race: 2015 Quaker State 400 (Kentucky)
- Last race: 2015 Hollywood Casino 400 (Kansas)
Wins	Top tens	Poles
0	0	0

NASCAR O'Reilly Auto Parts Series career
- 6 races run over 2 years
- 2014 position: 41st
- Best finish: 41st (2014)
- First race: 2011 Feed the Children 300 (Kentucky)
- Last race: 2014 Drive for the Cure 300 (Charlotte)
Wins	Top tens	Poles
0	0	0

NASCAR FedEx Freight Truck Series career
- 1 race run over 1 year
- Best finish: 97th (2010)
- First race: 2010 Built Ford Tough 225 (Kentucky)
Wins	Top tens	Poles
0	0	0

ARCA Menards Series career
- 145 races run over 18 years
- ARCA no., team: No. 69 (Kimmel Racing)
- Best finish: 8th (2013)
- First race: 2008 Cayuga ARCA Re/Max 250 (Cayuga)
- Last race: 2026 Menards 150 (Kansas)
Wins	Top tens	Poles
0	50	2
- Statistics up to date as of September 25, 2026.

William Kimmel III (born May 11, 1988) is an American stock car racing driver and crew chief. He is the son of Bill Kimmel Jr. and nephew of Frank Kimmel. He currently crew chiefs his family team Kimmel Racing's No. 68 car in the ARCA Menards Series driven by Alli Owens. He has also competed part-time for the team as a driver each year since 2009. He has also previously made starts in the NASCAR Cup Series, NASCAR O'Reilly Auto Parts Series, and NASCAR Craftsman Truck Series.

== Racing career ==
Kimmel began his racing career in 1998; in 2006, he began competing at Salem Speedway, winning the track's Rookie of the Year award for Super Late Model drivers. The following year he won the track's championship, becoming the youngest driver to do so. He made his debut in the ARCA Racing Series in 2008, competing in 62 races in the series between 2008 and 2013 with a best finish of second at Salem in 2011. Kimmel also won the Polar Bear 150 street-stock race at Rockingham Speedway in 2010, beating Kurt Busch.

In 2010, Kimmel made his debut in NASCAR competition, driving the No. 44 Ford in a Camping World Truck Series event at Kentucky Speedway, finishing 21st. He made his first start in the Nationwide Series the following year at Kentucky Speedway, driving for Go Green Racing; he finished 35th after an accident.

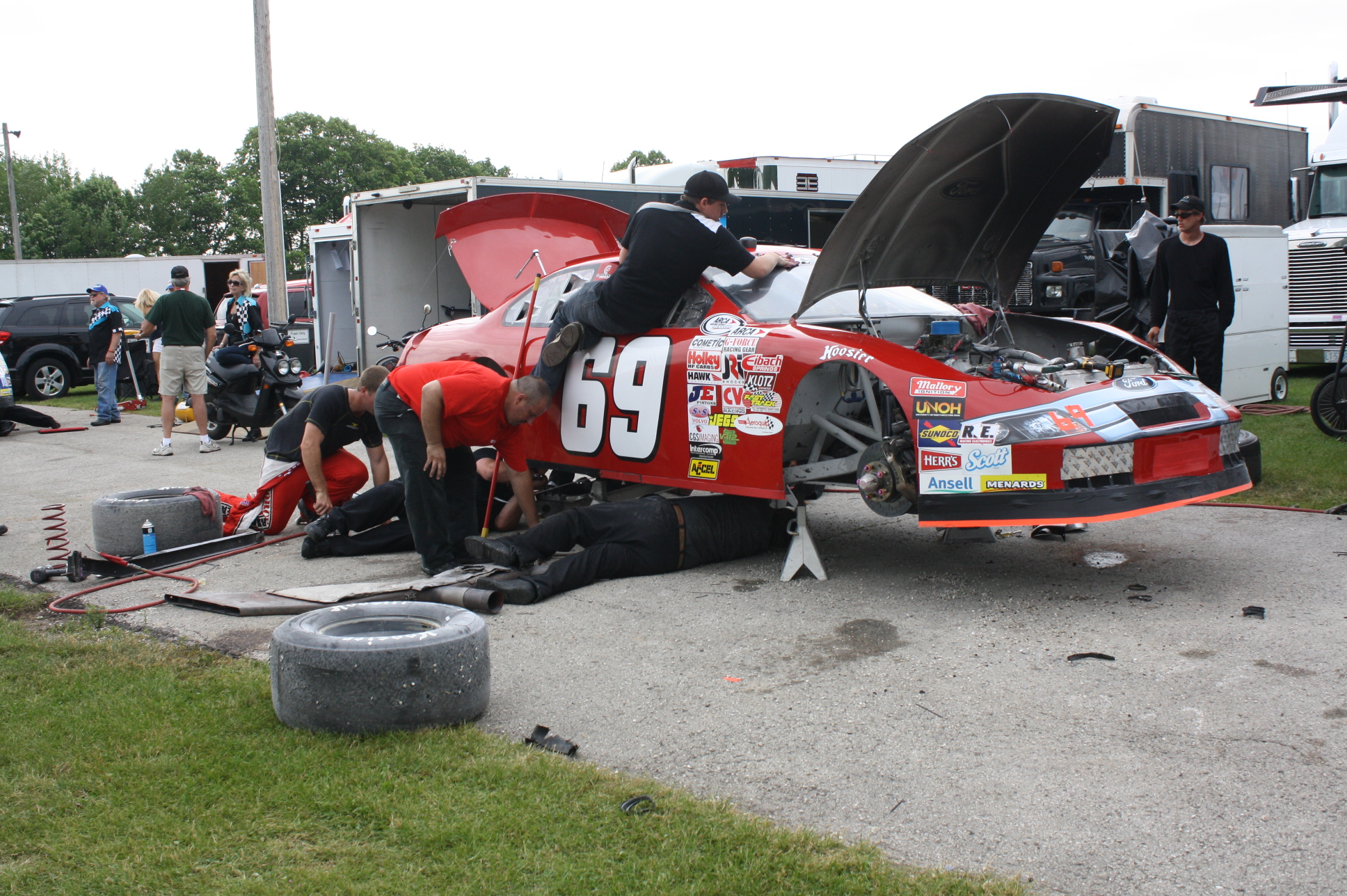
Kimmel's 2013 ARCA car at Road America.

In January 2014, Kimmel announced that he would be driving for TriStar Motorsports part-time in the Nationwide Series during the 2014 season, competing in five events driving the No. 44 Toyota.

On May 12, 2015, Kimmel joined Go FAS Racing for his Sprint Cup Series debut, which took place in the Quaker State 400 at Kentucky. Kimmel finished in 38th, five laps behind the leaders. He then raced at Kansas for the Hollywood Casino 400, and finished 39th.

Kimmel crew chiefed his team's No. 68 car in the ARCA season-opener at Daytona in 2026.

== Motorsports career results ==
=== Stock car career summary ===
Season	Series	Team	Races	Wins	Top 5	Top 10	Points	Position
2008	ARCA Re/Max Series	Hixson Motorsports	1	0	0	0	75	141st
2009	ARCA Re/Max Series	Kimmel Racing	3	0	0	1	395	70th
2010	ARCA Racing Series	Kimmel Racing	3	0	0	1	700	37th
2010	ARCA Racing Series	Mark Gibson Racing	2	0	0	0	700	37th
2010	NASCAR Camping World Truck Series	Kimmel Racing	1	0	0	0	100	97th
2011	ARCA Racing Series	Kimmel Racing	16	0	2	3	2235	15th
2011	NASCAR Nationwide Series	Go Green Racing	1	0	0	0	9	85th
2012	ARCA Racing Series	Kimmel Racing	18	0	2	6	2990	12th
2013	ARCA Racing Series	Kimmel Racing	18	0	3	6	4215	8th
2013	ARCA Racing Series	Cunningham Motorsports	3	0	0	2	4215	8th
2014	ARCA Racing Series	Kimmel Racing	12	0	4	6	1800	18th
2014	NASCAR Nationwide Series	TriStar Motorsports	5	0	0	0	74	41st
2015	ARCA Racing Series	Kimmel Racing	17	0	3	4	3000	11th
2015	NASCAR Sprint Cup Series	Go Fas Racing	2	0	0	0	11	46th
2016	ARCA Racing Series	Kimmel Racing	8	0	1	2	2060	13th
2016	ARCA Racing Series	Cunningham Motorsports	2	0	0	2	2060	13th
2016	ARCA Racing Series	Higdon Racing	1	0	0	0	2060	13th
2017	ARCA Racing Series	Kimmel Racing	8	0	0	3	1075	26th
2018	ARCA Racing Series	Kimmel Racing	8	0	1	2	1310	18th
2019	ARCA Menards Series	Kimmel Racing	2	0	1	1	345	51st
2020	ARCA Menards Series	Kimmel Racing	2	0	0	0	61	46th
2021	ARCA Menards Series	Kimmel Racing	3	0	1	2	113	34th
2022	ARCA Menards Series	Kimmel Racing	6	0	1	2	165	24th
2023	ARCA Menards Series East	Kimmel Racing	1	0	0	1	36	34th
2023	ARCA Menards Series	Kimmel Racing	2	0	1	1	72	54th
2024	ARCA Menards Series	Kimmel Racing	3	0	2	2	106	40th
2025	ARCA Menards Series	Kimmel Racing	3	0	0	1	74	64th
2026	ARCA Menards Series	Kimmel Racing	5	0	1	2	147	29th

=== NASCAR ===
(key) (Bold – Pole position awarded by qualifying time. Italics – Pole position earned by points standings or practice time. * – Most laps led.)

==== Sprint Cup Series ====
NASCAR Sprint Cup Series results
Year	Team	No.	Make	1	2	3	4	5	6	7	8	9	10	11	12	13	14	15	16	17	18	19	20	21	22	23	24	25	26	27	28	29	30	31	32	33	34	35	36	NSCC	Pts	Ref
2015	Go FAS Racing	32	Ford	DAY	ATL	LVS	PHO	CAL	MAR	TEX	BRI	RCH	TAL	KAN	CLT	DOV	POC	MCH	SON	DAY	KEN; 38	NHA	IND	POC	GLN	MCH	BRI	DAR	RCH	CHI	NHA	DOV	CLT	KAN; 39	TAL	MAR	TEX	PHO	HOM	46th	11	

==== Nationwide Series ====
NASCAR Nationwide Series results
Year	Team	No.	Make	1	2	3	4	5	6	7	8	9	10	11	12	13	14	15	16	17	18	19	20	21	22	23	24	25	26	27	28	29	30	31	32	33	34	NNSC	Pts	Ref
2011	Go Green Racing	39	Ford	DAY	PHO	LVS	BRI	CAL	TEX	TAL	NSH	RCH	DAR	DOV	IOW	CLT	CHI	MCH	ROA	DAY	KEN; 35	NHA	NSH	IRP	IOW	GLN	CGV	BRI	ATL	RCH	CHI	DOV	KAN	CLT	TEX	PHO	HOM	85th	9	
2014	TriStar Motorsports	44	Toyota	DAY	PHO; 33	LVS	BRI; 22	CAL	TEX	DAR	RCH	TAL	IOW	CLT	DOV	MCH	ROA	KEN	DAY	NHA	CHI	IND	IOW	GLN	MOH	BRI	ATL	RCH; 25	CHI; 28	KEN	DOV	KAN	CLT; 38	TEX	PHO	HOM		41st	74	

==== Camping World Truck Series ====
NASCAR Camping World Truck Series results
Year	Team	No.	Make	1	2	3	4	5	6	7	8	9	10	11	12	13	14	15	16	17	18	19	20	21	22	23	24	25	NCWTC	Pts	Ref
2010	Kimmel Racing	44	Ford	DAY	ATL	MAR	NSH	KAN	DOV	CLT	TEX	MCH	IOW	GTY	IRP	POC	NSH	DAR	BRI	CHI	KEN; 21	NHA	LVS	MAR	TAL	TEX	PHO	HOM	97th	100	

^{*} Season still in progress
^{1} Ineligible for series points

=== ARCA Menards Series ===
(key) (Bold – Pole position awarded by qualifying time. Italics – Pole position earned by points standings or practice time. * – Most laps led.)

ARCA Menards Series results
Year	Team	No.	Make	1	2	3	4	5	6	7	8	9	10	11	12	13	14	15	16	17	18	19	20	21	AMSC	Pts	Ref
2008	Hixson Motorsports	29	Chevy	DAY	SLM	IOW	KAN	CAR	KEN	TOL	POC	MCH	CAY; 31	KEN	BLN	POC	NSH	ISF	DSF	CHI	SLM	NJE	TAL	TOL	141st	75	
2009	Kimmel Racing	68	Ford	DAY; 18	SLM	CAR	TAL	KEN	TOL	POC	MCH	MFD	IOW	KEN	BLN	POC	ISF; 8	CHI	TOL	DSF; 33	NJE	SLM	KAN	CAR	70th	395	
2010	Kimmel Racing	68	Ford	DAY	PBE; 30	SLM	TEX	TAL	TOL	POC	MCH						ISF; 21	CHI	DSF; 6	TOL	SLM	KAN	CAR		37th	700	
2010	Mark Gibson Racing	59	Dodge									IOW; 18	MFD	POC; 15	BLN	NJE									37th	700	
2011	Kimmel Racing	68	Ford	DAY	TAL; 38	SLM; 29	TOL	NJE; 31	CHI; 31	POC; 32	MCH; 37	WIN; 27	BLN; 27	IOW; 37	IRP	POC; 12	ISF; 4	MAD; 30	DSF; 8	SLM; 2	KAN; 17	TOL; 29			15th	2235	
2012	Kimmel Racing	68	Ford	DAY; 3	MOB; 25	SLM; 27	TAL; 6	TOL; Wth	ELK; 26	POC; 34	MCH; 30	WIN; 27	NJE; 5	IOW; 38	CHI; 10		POC; 9		ISF; 11		SLM; 25	DSF; C	KAN; 9		12th	2990	
2012	Kimmel Racing	69	Ford													IRP; 34		BLN; 27		MAD; 27					12th	2990	
2013	Kimmel Racing	68	Ford	DAY; 33	MOB; 27	SLM; 3	TAL; 36	TOL; 29					WIN; 20				BLN; 23		MAD; 22						8th	4215	
2013	Kimmel Racing	69	Ford						ELK; 18		MCH; 7	ROA; 11		CHI; 4	NJE; 4			ISF; 28		DSF; 24	IOW; 9	SLM; 12		KAN; 6	8th	4215	
2013	Cunningham Motorsports	22	Dodge							POC; 31						POC; 7							KEN; 7		8th	4215	
2014	Kimmel Racing	69	Ford	DAY; 38	MOB	SLM				POC; 4	MCH; 6	ELK		CHI; 4	IRP	POC; 2	BLN	ISF; 5		DSF; 21	SLM	KEN; 6			18th	1800	
2014	Kimmel Racing	68	Ford				TAL; 36	TOL	NJE				WIN; 16						MAD; 27				KAN; 29		18th	1800	
2015	Kimmel Racing	69	Ford	DAY; 10	MOB; 23	NSH; 25	SLM; 20	TAL; 29	TOL	NJE	POC; 4	MCH; 16	CHI; 3	WIN; 20	IOW; 26	IRP	POC; 17	BLN; 11		DSF; 14		KEN; 22	KAN; 21		11th	3000	
2015	Kimmel Racing	69	Toyota																ISF; 23		SLM; 3				11th	3000	
2016	Kimmel Racing	69	Chevy	DAY; 18	NSH	SLM	TAL; 4	TOL																	13th	2060	
2016	Kimmel Racing	69	Ford						NJE; 16	POC; 29	MCH					POC; 10	BLN	ISF; 19	DSF; 11	SLM; 18	CHI	KEN	KAN		13th	2060	
2016	Cunningham Motorsports	22	Ford									MAD; 10	WIN; 8												13th	2060	
2016	Higdon Racing	08	Chevy											IOW; 18	IRP										13th	2060	
2017	Kimmel Racing	69	Ford	DAY	NSH	SLM; 18			ELK; 22	POC	MCH	MAD; 20	IOW	IRP; 26	POC	WIN	ISF; 9	ROA	**DSF**; 7	SLM; 10	CHI	KEN	KAN		26th	1075	
2017	Kimmel Racing	69	Chevy				TAL; 33	TOL																	26th	1075	
2018	Kimmel Racing	69	Ford	DAY	NSH; 24	SLM; 12	TAL	TOL; 23	CLT	POC	MCH	MAD	GTW; 13	CHI; 15	IOW	ELK	POC	ISF; Wth	BLN	DSF; 2	SLM	IRP; 10	KAN; 13		18th	1310	
2019	Kimmel Racing	69	Ford	DAY	FIF	SLM	TAL	NSH	TOL	CLT	POC	MCH	MAD	GTW	CHI	ELK	IOW	POC	ISF; 5	DSF; 18	SLM	IRP	KAN		51st	345	
2020	Kimmel Racing	69	Ford	DAY	PHO	TAL	POC	IRP	KEN	IOW	KAN	TOL	TOL	MCH	DAY; 13	GTW	L44	TOL	BRI	WIN	MEM	ISF; 14	KAN		46th	61	
2021	Kimmel Racing	69	Ford	DAY	PHO	TAL	KAN	TOL	CLT	MOH	POC	ELK	BLN	IOW	WIN	GLN	MCH	ISF; 6	MLW	DSF; 9	BRI				34th	113	
2021	Kimmel Racing	69	Toyota																			SLM; 4	KAN		34th	113	
2022	Kimmel Racing	68	Ford	DAY; 35	PHO	TAL																			24th	165	
2022	Kimmel Racing	69	Toyota				KAN; 6	CLT; 19	IOW	BLN	ELK	MOH	POC	IRP	MCH	GLN									24th	165	
2022	Kimmel Racing	69	Ford														ISF; 16	MLW	DSF; 19	KAN	BRI	SLM; 4	TOL		24th	165	
2023	Kimmel Racing	69	Ford	DAY	PHO	TAL	KAN	CLT	BLN	ELK	MOH	IOW	POC	MCH	IRP	GLN	ISF	MLW	DSF; 3	KAN	BRI	SLM; 13	TOL		54th	72	
2024	Kimmel Racing	68	Ford	DAY	PHO	TAL	DOV	KAN; Wth																	40th	106	
2024	Kimmel Racing	69	Ford						CLT; 4	IOW	MOH	BLN	IRP	SLM; 4	ELK	MCH	ISF	MLW	DSF; 18	GLN	BRI	KAN	TOL		40th	106	
2025	Kimmel Racing	68	Ford	DAY	PHO	TAL	KAN; 25																		64th	74	
2025	Kimmel Racing	69	Ford					**CLT**; 28	MCH	BLN	ELK	LRP	DOV	IRP	IOW	GLN	ISF	MAD	DSF	BRI	SLM; 7	KAN	TOL		64th	74	
2026	Kimmel Racing	69	Ford	DAY	PHO	KAN; 28				MCH; 8	POC	BER	ELK	CHI	LRP	IRP	IOW	ISF	MAD	DSF	SLM; 3	BRI	KAN; 23		29th	147	
2026	Kimmel Racing	69	Toyota				TAL; 11	GLN	TOL																29th	147	

==== ARCA Menards Series East ====
ARCA Menards Series East results
Year	Team	No.	Make	1	2	3	4	5	6	7	8	AMSEC	Pts	Ref
2023	Kimmel Racing	69	Ford	FIF	DOV	NSV	FRS; 8	IOW	IRP	MLW	BRI	34th	36	

^{*} Season still in progress
