= 2023 General Tire 200 (Talladega) =

Third race of the 2023 ARCA Menards Series

Race details
- Race 3 of 20 of the 2023 ARCA Menards Series
- Date: April 22, 2023
- Official name: 61st Annual General Tire 200
- Location: Talladega Superspeedway, Lincoln, Alabama
- Course: Permanent racing facility
- Course length: 2.66 miles (4.28 km)
- Distance: 76 laps, 202 mi (325 km)
- Scheduled distance: 76 laps, 202 mi (325 km)

Pole position
Driver	Taylor Gray	Joe Gibbs Racing
- Grid positions set by competition-based formula

Most laps led
Driver	Jesse Love	Venturini Motorsports
- Laps: 35

Winner
No. 20	Jesse Love	Venturini Motorsports

Television in the United States
- Network: FS1
- Announcers: Jamie Little, Phil Parsons, and Austin Cindric

Radio in the United States
- Radio: MRN

The 2023 General Tire 200 was the 3rd stock car race of the 2023 ARCA Menards Series season, and the 61st iteration of the event. The race is scheduled to be held on Saturday, April 22, 2023, in Lincoln, Alabama at Talladega Superspeedway, a 2.66 mile (4.28 km) permanent tri-oval shaped superspeedway. The race took the scheduled 76 laps to complete. Jesse Love, driving for Venturini Motorsports, would dominate a portion of the race, and earned his 3rd career ARCA Menards Series win, and his first of the season. Love and Andrés Pérez de Lara would dominate the race in general, leading 35 and 28 laps respectively. To fill out the podium, Gus Dean, driving for Venturini Motorsports, and Bret Holmes, driving for his family-owned team, Bret Holmes Racing, would finish 2nd and 3rd, respectively.

== Background ==
Talladega Superspeedway, formerly known as Alabama International Motor Speedway, is a motorsports complex located north of Talladega, Alabama. It is located on the former Anniston Air Force Base in the small city of Lincoln. A tri-oval, the track was constructed in 1969 by the International Speedway Corporation, a business controlled by the France family. Talladega is most known for its steep banking. The track currently hosts NASCAR's Cup Series, Xfinity Series and Craftsman Truck Series. Talladega is the longest NASCAR oval with a length of 2.66-mile-long (4.28 km) tri-oval like the Daytona International Speedway, which is 2.5-mile-long (4.0 km).

=== Entry list ===
- (R) denotes rookie driver.

#	Driver	Team	Make	Sponsor
0	Kevin Hinckle	Wayne Peterson Racing	Ford	Parsons Farms
2	Andrés Pérez de Lara (R)	Rev Racing	Chevrolet	Max Siegel Inc.
03	Alex Clubb	Clubb Racing Inc.	Ford	Clubb Racing Inc.
06	A. J. Moyer	Wayne Peterson Racing	Chevrolet	River's Edge Cottages & RV Park
6	Jack Wood	Rev Racing	Chevrolet	Velocity Racing, Max Siegel Inc.
7	Eric Caudell	CCM Racing	Toyota	Coble Enterprises, Red Tide Canopies
8	Sean Corr	Empire Racing	Chevrolet	Empire Racing
10	Ed Pompa	Fast Track Racing	Chevrolet	HYTORC of New York, Double "H" Ranch
11	Bryce Haugeberg	Fast Track Racing	Toyota	Magnum Contracting
12	Tim Monroe	Fast Track Racing	Toyota	Fast Track Racing
15	Amber Balcaen	Venturini Motorsports	Toyota	ICON Direct
18	Taylor Gray	Joe Gibbs Racing	Toyota	Mobil 1
20	Jesse Love	Venturini Motorsports	Toyota	Yahoo!
23	Bret Holmes	Bret Holmes Racing	Chevrolet	Golden Eagle Syrup
25	Gus Dean	Venturini Motorsports	Toyota	Dean Custom Air
27	Tim Richmond	Richmond Motorsports	Toyota	Immigration Legal Center
30	Frankie Muniz (R)	Rette Jones Racing	Ford	HairClub
32	Christian Rose (R)	AM Racing	Ford	West Virginia Tourism
35	Greg Van Alst	Greg Van Alst Motorsports	Chevrolet	CB Fabricating
44	Jason White	Jeff McClure Racing	Chevrolet	Powder Ventures Excavations
45	Tony Cosentino	Tamayo Cosentino Racing	Chevrolet	Peppers Polarized Sunglasses
48	Brad Smith	Brad Smith Motorsports	Chevrolet	Copraya.com
53	Patrick Emerling	Emerling-Gase Motorsports	Ford	Emerling-Gase Motorsports
55	Toni Breidinger	Venturini Motorsports	Toyota	Rootly
57	Hunter Deshautelle	Brother-in-Law Racing	Chevrolet	Brother-in-Law Racing
62	Steve Lewis Jr.	Steve Lewis Racing	Chevrolet	Telco Construction, Jeffery Machine
63	Logan Misuraca	Spraker Racing Enterprises	Chevrolet	Celsius Energy Drink
66	Jon Garrett (R)	Veer Motorsports	Chevrolet	Weinstein Law Firm
69	Scott Melton	Kimmel Racing	Ford	Melton-McFadden Insurance Agency
73	Andy Jankowiak	KLAS Motorsports	Ford	Whelen
74	Mandy Chick	Team Chick Motorsports	Chevrolet	Rose–Hulman Institute of Technology
75	Bryan Dauzat	Brother-in-Law Racing	Chevrolet	Brother-in-Law Racing
82	Kevin Campbell	KC Motorsports	Chevrolet	Missouri Tigers
93	Caleb Costner	Costner Weaver Motorsports	Chevrolet	Innovative Tiny Houses, Lickety Lew's
97	Jason Kitzmiller	CR7 Motorsports	Chevrolet	A. L. L. Construction
Official entry list

== Practice ==
The first and only practice session was held on Friday, April 21, at 3:00 PM CST. For practice, drivers were separated into different groups. Bret Holmes, driving for his family-owned team, Bret Holmes Racing, would set the fastest time in the session, with a lap of 52.351, and an average speed of 182.919 mph (294.380 km/h).

Pos.	#	Driver	Team	Make	Time	Speed
1	23	Bret Holmes	Bret Holmes Racing	Chevrolet	52.351	182.919
2	20	Jesse Love	Venturini Motorsports	Toyota	52.356	182.902
3	25	Gus Dean	Venturini Motorsports	Toyota	52.362	182.881
Full practice results

== Starting lineup ==
No qualifying session will be held, instead, the starting lineup will be based on the owners points from the previous session. As a result, Taylor Gray, driving for Joe Gibbs Racing, would earn the pole.

Pos.	#	Driver	Team	Make
1	18	Taylor Gray	Joe Gibbs Racing	Toyota
2	20	Jesse Love	Venturini Motorsports	Toyota
3	2	Andrés Pérez de Lara (R)	Rev Racing	Chevrolet
4	69	Scott Melton	Kimmel Racing	Ford
5	15	Amber Balcaen	Venturini Motorsports	Toyota
6	6	Jack Wood	Rev Racing	Chevrolet
7	35	Greg Van Alst	Greg Van Alst Motorsports	Chevrolet
8	25	Gus Dean	Venturini Motorsports	Toyota
9	11	Bryce Haugeberg	Fast Track Racing	Toyota
10	30	Frankie Muniz (R)	Rette Jones Racing	Ford
11	12	Tim Monroe	Fast Track Racing	Toyota
12	10	Ed Pompa	Fast Track Racing	Chevrolet
13	48	Brad Smith	Brad Smith Motorsports	Chevrolet
14	03	Alex Clubb	Clubb Racing Inc.	Ford
15	06	A. J. Moyer	Wayne Peterson Racing	Chevrolet
16	66	Jon Garrett (R)	Veer Motorsports	Chevrolet
17	44	Jason White	Jeff McClure Racing	Chevrolet
18	23	Bret Holmes	Bret Holmes Racing	Chevrolet
19	55	Toni Breidinger	Venturini Motorsports	Toyota
20	7	Eric Caudell	CCM Racing	Toyota
21	73	Andy Jankowiak	KLAS Motorsports	Ford
22	0	Kevin Hinckle	Wayne Peterson Racing	Ford
23	97	Jason Kitzmiller	CR7 Motorsports	Chevrolet
24	32	Christian Rose (R)	AM Racing	Ford
25	57	Hunter Deshautelle	Brother-in-Law Racing	Chevrolet
26	8	Sean Corr	Empire Racing	Chevrolet
27	74	Mandy Chick	Team Chick Motorsports	Chevrolet
28	27	Tim Richmond	Richmond Motorsports	Toyota
29	63	Logan Misuraca	Spraker Racing Enterprises	Chevrolet
30	45	Tony Cosentino	Tamayo Cosentino Racing	Chevrolet
31	62	Steve Lewis Jr.	Steve Lewis Racing	Chevrolet
32	53	Patrick Emerling	Emerling-Gase Motorsports	Ford
33	75	Bryan Dauzat	Brother-in-Law Racing	Chevrolet
34	93	Caleb Costner	Costner Weaver Motorsports	Chevrolet
Withdrew
35	82	Kevin Campbell	KC Motorsports	Chevrolet
Official starting lineup

== Race results ==
Fin	St	#	Driver	Team	Make	Laps	Led	Status	Pts
1	2	20	Jesse Love	Venturini Motorsports	Toyota	76	35	Running	47
2	8	25	Gus Dean	Venturini Motorsports	Toyota	76	0	Running	42
3	18	23	Bret Holmes	Bret Holmes Racing	Chevrolet	76	0	Running	41
4	3	2	Andrés Pérez de Lara (R)	Rev Racing	Chevrolet	76	28	Running	41
5	26	8	Sean Corr	Empire Racing	Chevrolet	76	0	Running	39
6	6	6	Jack Wood	Rev Racing	Chevrolet	76	9	Running	39
7	1	18	Taylor Gray	Joe Gibbs Racing	Toyota	76	0	Running	39
8	4	69	Scott Melton	Kimmel Racing	Ford	76	0	Running	36
9	10	30	Frankie Muniz (R)	Rette Jones Racing	Ford	76	0	Running	35
10	17	44	Jason White	Jeff McClure Racing	Chevrolet	76	0	Running	34
11	30	45	Tony Cosentino	Tamayo Cosentino Racing	Chevrolet	76	0	Running	33
12	19	55	Toni Breidinger	Venturini Motorsports	Toyota	76	0	Running	32
13	12	10	Ed Pompa	Fast Track Racing	Chevrolet	76	0	Running	31
14	33	75	Bryan Dauzat	Brother-in-Law Racing	Chevrolet	76	0	Running	30
15	9	11	Bryce Haugeberg	Fast Track Racing	Toyota	76	0	Running	29
16	32	53	Patrick Emerling	Emerling-Gase Motorsports	Ford	76	0	Running	28
17	24	32	Christian Rose (R)	AM Racing	Ford	74	0	Running	27
18	21	73	Andy Jankowiak	KLAS Motorsports	Ford	72	0	Running	26
19	13	48	Brad Smith	Brad Smith Motorsports	Chevrolet	72	0	Running	25
20	15	06	A. J. Moyer	Wayne Peterson Racing	Chevrolet	71	0	Running	24
21	34	93	Caleb Costner	Costner Weaver Motorsports	Chevrolet	64	0	Crash	23
22	31	62	Steve Lewis Jr.	Steve Lewis Racing	Chevrolet	59	0	Running	22
23	20	7	Eric Caudell	CCM Racing	Toyota	45	4	Engine	22
24	27	74	Mandy Chick	Team Chick Motorsports	Chevrolet	40	0	Crash	20
25	28	27	Tim Richmond	Richmond Motorsports	Toyota	23	0	Brakes	19
26	23	97	Jason Kitzmiller	CR7 Motorsports	Chevrolet	23	0	Crash	18
27	16	66	Jon Garrett (R)	Veer Motorsports	Chevrolet	23	0	Crash	17
28	29	63	Logan Misuraca	Spraker Racing Enterprises	Chevrolet	23	0	Crash	16
29	25	57	Hunter Deshautelle	Brother-in-Law Racing	Chevrolet	23	0	Crash	15
30	22	0	Kevin Hinckle	Wayne Peterson Racing	Ford	21	0	Crash	14
31	5	15	Amber Balcaen	Venturini Motorsports	Toyota	15	0	Clutch	13
32	7	35	Greg Van Alst	Greg Van Alst Motorsports	Chevrolet	15	0	Crash	12
33	14	03	Alex Clubb	Clubb Racing Inc.	Ford	7	0	Electrical	11
34	11	12	Tim Monroe	Fast Track Racing	Toyota	5	0	Drive Shaft	10
Official race results

== Standings after the race ==
Drivers' Championship standings

	Pos	Driver	Points
1	1	Frankie Muniz	106
2	2	Jesse Love	103 (-3)
2	3	Greg Van Alst	93 (-13)
2	4	Jack Wood	91 (-15)
2	5	Tony Cosentino	91 (-15)
4	6	Andrés Pérez de Lara	85 (-21)
2	7	Christian Rose	80 (-26)
5	8	Sean Corr	80 (-26)
'3	9	Toni Breidinger	75 (-31)
13	10	Jason White	70 (-36)

- Note: Only the first 10 positions are included for the driver standings.

Previous race: 2023 General Tire 150 (Phoenix)	ARCA Menards Series; 2023 season	Next race: 2023 Dawn 150
