= 2023 General Tire 150 (Charlotte) =

5th race of the 2023 ARCA Menards Series

Race details
- Race 5 of 20 of the 2023 ARCA Menards Series
- Date: May 26, 2023
- Official name: 13th Annual Dawn 150
- Location: Charlotte Motor Speedway, Concord, North Carolina
- Course: Permanent racing facility
- Course length: 2.4 km (1.5 miles)
- Distance: 103 laps, 154 mi (248 km)
- Scheduled distance: 100 laps, 150 mi (241 km)
- Average speed: 103.804 mph (167.056 km/h)

Pole position
Driver	Jesse Love	Venturini Motorsports
- Time: 29.993

Most laps led
Driver	Jesse Love	Venturini Motorsports
- Laps: 67

Winner
No. 20	Jesse Love	Venturini Motorsports

Television in the United States
- Network: FS1
- Announcers: Jamie Little, Phil Parsons, and Aric Almirola

Radio in the United States
- Radio: MRN

The 2023 General Tire 150 was the 5th stock car race of the 2023 ARCA Menards Series season, and the 13th iteration of the event. The race was held on Friday, May 26, 2023, in Concord, North Carolina at Charlotte Motor Speedway, a 1.5 mile (2.4 km) permanent tri-oval shaped racetrack. The race was increased from 100 to 103 laps, due to a NASCAR overtime finish. Jesse Love, driving for Venturini Motorsports, would hold off the field on the final restart, and earned his 5th career ARCA Menards Series win, and his third consecutive win of the season. Love dominated the majority of the race as well, leading a race-high 67 laps. To fill out the podium, Dean Thompson, driving for Venturini Motorsports, and Taylor Gray, driving for Tricon Garage, would finish 2nd and 3rd, respectively.

== Background ==
Charlotte Motor Speedway (previously known as Lowe's Motor Speedway from 1999 to 2009) is a motorsport complex located in Concord, North Carolina, 13-mile (21 km) outside Charlotte. The complex features a 1.500 mi (2.414 km) quad oval track that hosts NASCAR racing including the prestigious Coca-Cola 600 on Memorial Day weekend, and the Bank of America Roval 400. The speedway was built in 1959 by Bruton Smith and is considered the home track for NASCAR with many race teams located in the Charlotte area. The track is owned and operated by Speedway Motorsports with Greg Walter as track president.

The 2,000 acres (8.1 km^{2}) complex also features a state-of-the-art 0.250 mi (0.402 km) drag racing strip, ZMAX Dragway. It is the only all-concrete, four-lane drag strip in the United States and hosts NHRA events. Alongside the drag strip is a state-of-the-art clay oval that hosts dirt racing including the World of Outlaws finals among other popular racing events.

=== Entry list ===
- (R) denotes rookie driver.

#	Driver	Team	Make	Sponsor
01	C. J. McLaughlin	Fast Track Racing	Chevrolet	Universal Technical Institute
2	Andrés Pérez de Lara (R)	Rev Racing	Chevrolet	Max Siegel Inc.
03	Alex Clubb	Clubb Racing Inc.	Ford	Echo Effect
06	A. J. Moyer	Wayne Peterson Racing	Ford	River's Edge Cottages & RV Park
6	Jack Wood	Rev Racing	Chevrolet	Velocity Racing
8	Sean Corr	Empire Racing	Chevrolet	Navy Seal Foundation, NESCO
10	Ed Pompa	Fast Track Racing	Toyota	HYTORC of New York, Double "H" Ranch
11	Stephanie Moyer	Fast Track Racing	Toyota	GY6USA.com, Victory Riding Academy
12	Brayton Laster	Fast Track Racing	Ford	AutoRepairVinStickers.com
15	Dean Thompson	Venturini Motorsports	Toyota	Thompson Pipe Group
17	Taylor Gray	Tricon Garage	Toyota	Dead On Tools
18	Connor Mosack	Joe Gibbs Racing	Toyota	Mobil 1
20	Jesse Love	Venturini Motorsports	Toyota	GearWrench
25	Gus Dean	Venturini Motorsports	Toyota	Dean Custom Air, Mobil 1
30	Frankie Muniz (R)	Rette Jones Racing	Ford	HairClub
31	Stephen Leicht	Rise Motorsports	Chevrolet	Inspire. Real. Change.
32	Christian Rose (R)	AM Racing	Ford	West Virginia Tourism
35	Greg Van Alst	Greg Van Alst Motorsports	Ford	CB Fabricating
45	Tony Cosentino	Tamayo Cosentino Racing	Chevrolet	The Gutter Team
48	Brad Smith	Brad Smith Motorsports	Chevrolet	Copraya.com
55	Toni Breidinger	Venturini Motorsports	Toyota	Rootly
66	Jon Garrett (R)	Veer Motorsports	Chevrolet	Venture Foods
69	Scott Melton	Kimmel Racing	Toyota	Melton-McFadden Insurance Agency
72	Cody Coughlin	Coughlin Brothers Racing	Ford	JEGS, Cody Coughlin Company
73	Andy Jankowiak	KLAS Motorsports	Toyota	V1 Fiber
75	Bryan Dauzat	Brother-in-Law Racing	Chevrolet	Brother-in-Law Racing
93	Caleb Costner	Costner Weaver Motorsports	Chevrolet	Innovative Tiny Houses, Lickety Lew's
97	Grant Enfinger	CR7 Motorsports	Chevrolet	Grant County Mulch
Official entry list

== Practice ==
The first and only practice session was held on Friday, May 26, at 11:40 AM EST, and would last for 45 minutes. Taylor Gray, driving for Tricon Garage, would set the fastest time in the session, with a lap of 30.218, and an average speed of 178.701 mph (287.591 km/h).

Pos.	#	Driver	Team	Make	Time	Speed
1	17	Taylor Gray	Tricon Garage	Toyota	30.218	178.701
2	2	Andrés Pérez de Lara (R)	Rev Racing	Chevrolet	30.226	178.654
3	18	Connor Mosack	Joe Gibbs Racing	Toyota	30.312	178.147
Full practice results

== Qualifying ==
Qualifying was held on Friday, May 26, at 12:40 PM EST. The qualifying system used is a multi car, multi lap system with only one round. Whoever sets the fastest time in the round wins the pole. Jesse Love, driving for Venturini Motorsports, would score the pole for the race, with a lap of 29.993, and an average speed of 180.042 mph (289.750 km/h).

Pos.	#	Driver	Team	Make	Time	Speed
1	20	Jesse Love	Venturini Motorsports	Toyota	29.993	180.042
2	2	Andrés Pérez de Lara (R)	Rev Racing	Chevrolet	30.003	179.982
3	17	Taylor Gray	Tricon Garage	Toyota	30.104	179.378
4	15	Dean Thompson	Venturini Motorsports	Toyota	30.184	178.903
5	18	Connor Mosack	Joe Gibbs Racing	Toyota	30.188	178.879
6	25	Gus Dean	Venturini Motorsports	Toyota	30.288	178.288
7	6	Jack Wood	Rev Racing	Chevrolet	30.449	177.346
8	73	Andy Jankowiak	KLAS Motorsports	Toyota	30.745	175.638
9	35	Greg Van Alst	Greg Van Alst Motorsports	Ford	30.781	175.433
10	30	Frankie Muniz (R)	Rette Jones Racing	Ford	30.989	174.255
11	55	Toni Breidinger	Venturini Motorsports	Toyota	31.366	172.161
12	45	Tony Cosentino	Tamayo Cosentino Racing	Chevrolet	31.385	172.057
13	32	Christian Rose (R)	AM Racing	Ford	31.676	170.476
14	66	Jon Garrett	Veer Motorsports	Chevrolet	32.062	168.424
15	69	Scott Melton	Kimmel Racing	Toyota	32.081	168.324
16	93	Caleb Costner	Costner Weaver Motorsports	Chevrolet	33.396	161.696
17	11	Stephanie Moyer	Fast Track Racing	Toyota	33.803	159.749
18	10	Ed Pompa	Fast Track Racing	Toyota	34.116	158.284
19	12	Brayton Laster	Fast Track Racing	Ford	34.350	157.205
20	75	Bryan Dauzat	Brother-in-Law Racing	Chevrolet	35.242	153.226
21	03	Alex Clubb	Clubb Racing Inc.	Ford	36.086	149.643
22	31	Stephen Leicht	Rise Motorsports	Chevrolet	39.801	135.675
23	48	Brad Smith	Brad Smith Motorsports	Chevrolet	42.638	126.648
24	06	A. J. Moyer	Wayne Peterson Racing	Ford	48.026	112.439
25	8	Sean Corr	Empire Racing	Chevrolet	–	–
26	97	Grant Enfinger	CR7 Motorsports	Chevrolet	–	–
27	01	C. J. McLaughlin	Fast Track Racing	Chevrolet	–	–
Withdrew
28	72	Cody Coughlin	Coughlin Brothers Racing	Ford	–	–
29	87	Charles Buchanan	Charles Buchanan Racing	Chevrolet	–	–
Official qualifying results

== Race results ==
Fin	St	#	Driver	Team	Make	Laps	Led	Status	Pts
1	1	20	Jesse Love	Venturini Motorsports	Toyota	103	67	Running	48
2	4	15	Dean Thompson	Venturini Motorsports	Toyota	103	15	Running	43
3	3	17	Taylor Gray	Tricon Garage	Toyota	103	0	Running	41
4	26	97	Grant Enfinger	CR7 Motorsports	Chevrolet	103	0	Running	40
5	8	73	Andy Jankowiak	KLAS Motorsports	Toyota	103	0	Running	39
6	10	30	Frankie Muniz (R)	Rette Jones Racing	Ford	103	0	Running	38
7	2	2	Andrés Pérez de Lara (R)	Rev Racing	Chevrolet	103	0	Running	37
8	13	32	Christian Rose (R)	AM Racing	Ford	103	4	Running	37
9	5	18	Connor Mosack	Joe Gibbs Racing	Toyota	103	17	Running	36
10	7	6	Jack Wood	Rev Racing	Chevrolet	103	0	Running	34
11	12	45	Tony Cosentino	Tamayo Cosentino Racing	Chevrolet	103	0	Running	33
12	11	55	Toni Breidinger	Venturini Motorsports	Toyota	102	0	Running	32
13	16	93	Caleb Costner	Costner Weaver Motorsports	Chevrolet	102	0	Running	31
14	14	66	Jon Garrett (R)	Veer Motorsports	Chevrolet	102	0	Running	30
15	6	25	Gus Dean	Venturini Motorsports	Toyota	101	0	Running	29
16	18	10	Ed Pompa	Fast Track Racing	Toyota	100	0	Running	28
17	17	11	Stephanie Moyer	Fast Track Racing	Toyota	99	0	Running	27
18	20	75	Bryan Dauzat	Brother-in-Law Racing	Chevrolet	97	0	Running	26
19	19	12	Brayton Laster	Fast Track Racing	Ford	96	0	Running	25
20	23	48	Brad Smith	Brad Smith Motorsports	Chevrolet	61	0	Too Slow	24
21	21	03	Alex Clubb	Clubb Racing Inc.	Ford	54	0	Running	23
22	9	35	Greg Van Alst	Greg Van Alst Motorsports	Ford	47	0	Accident	22
23	15	69	Scott Melton	Kimmel Racing	Toyota	39	0	Accident	21
24	25	8	Sean Corr	Empire Racing	Chevrolet	30	0	Handling	20
25	22	31	Stephen Leicht	Rise Motorsports	Chevrolet	25	0	Engine	19
26	27	01	C. J. McLaughlin	Fast Track Racing	Chevrolet	17	0	Engine	18
27	24	06	A. J. Moyer	Wayne Peterson Racing	Ford	12	0	Clutch	17
Withdrew
		72	Cody Coughlin	Coughlin Brothers Racing	Ford				
		87	Charles Buchanan	Charles Buchanan Racing	Chevrolet				
Official race results

== Standings after the race ==
Drivers' Championship standings

	Pos	Driver	Points
	1	Jesse Love	245
	2	Frankie Muniz	230 (-15)
	3	Jack Wood	214 (-31)
1	4	Andrés Pérez de Lara	209 (-36)
1	5	Tony Cosentino	203 (-42)
1	6	Christian Rose	201 (-44)
3	7	Greg Van Alst	199 (-46)
1	8	Toni Breidinger	190 (-55)
2	9	Jon Garrett	171 (-74)
2	10	A. J. Moyer	153 (-92)

- Note: Only the first 10 positions are included for the driver standings.

Previous race: 2023 Dawn 150	ARCA Menards Series; 2023 season	Next race: 2023 Herr's Snacks 200
