= Bryan Dauzat =

American racing driver (born 1959)

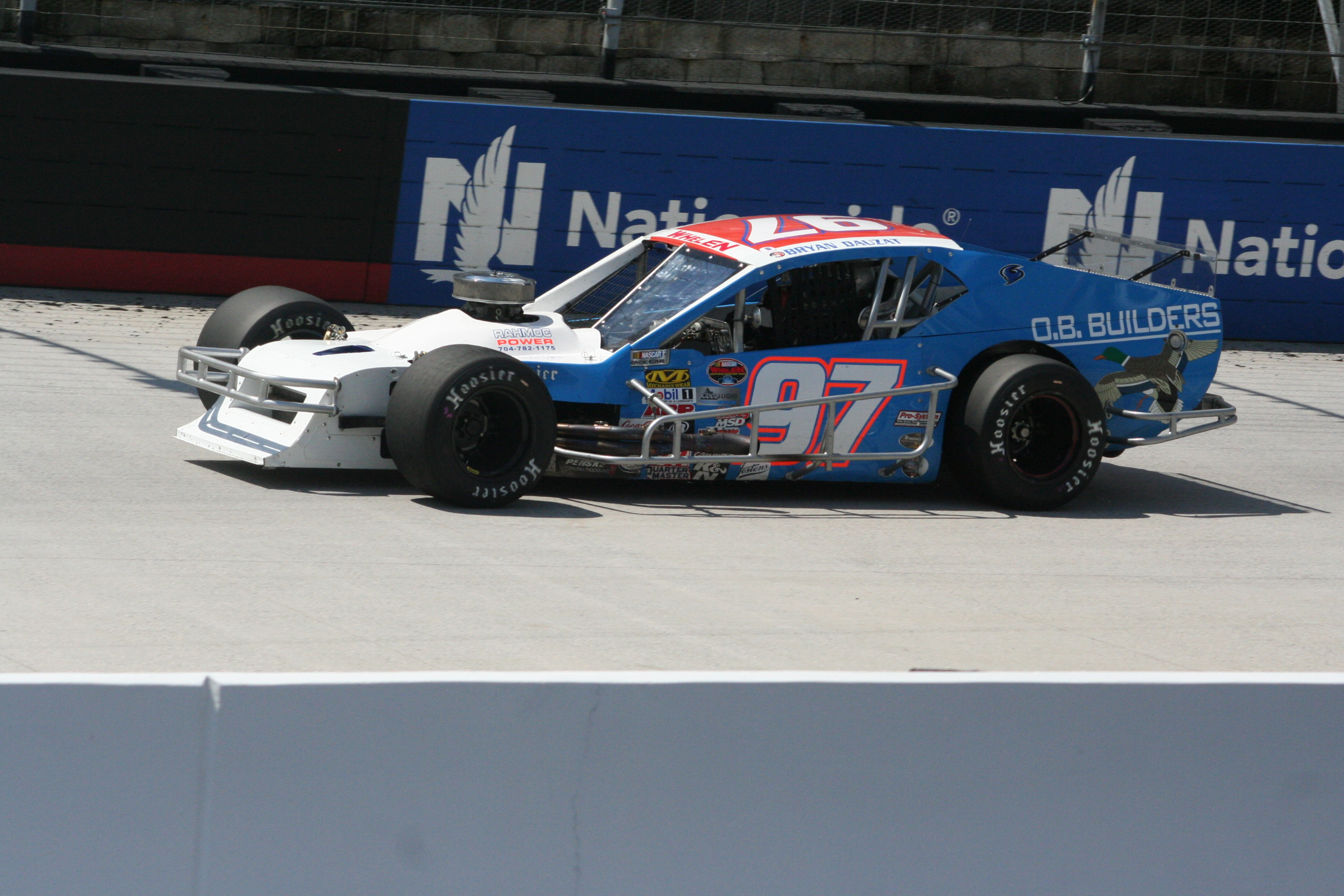
- Dauzat in the NASCAR Whelen Modified Tour race at Bristol Motor Speedway in 2015
- Born: Bryan Keith Dauzat; November 30, 1959 (age 66); Alexandria, Louisiana, U.S.

NASCAR FedEx Freight Truck Series career
- 23 races run over 10 years
- 2026 position: 124th
- Best finish: 45th (2018)
- First race: 2014 UNOH 200 (Bristol)
- Last race: 2025 MillerTech Battery 200 (Pocono)
Wins	Top tens	Poles
0	2	0

ARCA Menards Series career
- 30 races run over 10 years
- Best finish: 30th (2018)
- First race: 2014 International Motorsports Hall of Fame 200 (Talladega)
- Last race: 2026 Alabama Manufactured Housing 200 (Talladega)
Wins	Top tens	Poles
0	0	0
- Statistics up to date as of November 6, 2026.

Bryan Keith Dauzat (pronounced "dough-zuh"; born November 30, 1959) is an American former professional stock car racing driver. He last competed part-time in the NASCAR Craftsman Truck Series, driving the No. 28 Chevrolet Silverado RST for FDNY Racing, and part-time in the ARCA Menards Series, driving the No. 75 Chevrolet SS for Brother-In-Law Racing. He has also competed in the NASCAR Craftsman Truck Series and the NASCAR Whelen Modified Tour.

== Racing career ==
=== ARCA Menards Series ===
In 2014, Dauzat made his ARCA Racing Series debut at Talladega, finishing 26th. He attempted to qualify for the season-opening race at Daytona the following year but did not make the race. In 2016, Dauzat ran the restrictor plate tracks and qualified but did not start at Kansas.

For 2017, Dauzat teamed up with Bob Rahilly, owner of the former NASCAR Cup Series team RahMoc Enterprises. He also acquired a car from JR Motorsports. He also invited prospect Calvin Carroll to test with the team at Daytona. Dauzat ran a career-high five races in 2017, running Daytona, Talladega, Pocono, Chicagoland and Kansas. He returned to Daytona in 2018 but was caught up in a wreck that also included Bo LeMastus and Quin Houff.

=== Craftsman Truck Series ===
Dauzat made his Camping World Truck Series debut at Bristol in 2014 with FDNY Racing, where he started and finished in the final position of the field, 36th, falling out due to suspension problems. He returned in 2017 to try to qualify for the season-opener at Daytona but failed to qualify. In 2018, he returned once again to Daytona, where he finished eighteenth after being knocked out of the top ten in a late wreck in what was originally intended to be FDNY Racing's final race. However, on August 27, 2018, the team announced on its Facebook that they would run the Truck race at Talladega, and with Dauzat driving, the team achieved its first-ever top-ten finish in eighth place.

During the season-opening 2019 NextEra Energy 250 at Daytona, Dauzat accidentally hit his jackman, Billy Rock, on pit road when his truck experienced braking problems. Rock was rushed to Halifax Health for his injuries and was diagnosed with a broken shoulder. He was released from the hospital shortly after.

Dauzat returned to FDNY, and their No. 28 truck was in 2020. He and the team ran more races than originally scheduled because the field size for the Truck Series was expanded from 32 to 40 as a result of the cancellation of qualifying due to the COVID-19 pandemic, and the team had owner points to make the races after their attempt at Daytona.

On January 29, 2021, it was revealed that Dauzat would return for another part-time schedule in the FDNY No. 28 truck in 2021, beginning at the season-opener at Daytona. Dauzat entered the CRC Brakleen 150 at Pocono Raceway in June, the fourteenth race of the season, finishing 34th. Dauzat ran part-time in the FDNY No. 28 truck again in 2022 and 2023, and would run at least the season-opener at Daytona for the team in 2024. Dauzat opened 2024 with the second top-ten finish of his NASCAR Truck Series career after finishing in ninth place. Dauzat would later compete in that year's Pocono race, but finished in 34th after being involved in a crash in the final laps with Zane Smith.

On September 24, 2026, it was announced that Dauzat would make his final start at Talladega, before retiring from the Truck Series.

== Personal life ==
Dauzat serves as president of O. B. Builders, a sponsor of his racing career.

== Motorsports career results ==
=== NASCAR ===
(key) (Bold – Pole position awarded by qualifying time. Italics – Pole position earned by points standings or practice time. * – Most laps led.)

==== Craftsman Truck Series ====
NASCAR Craftsman Truck Series results
Year	Team	No.	Make	1	2	3	4	5	6	7	8	9	10	11	12	13	14	15	16	17	18	19	20	21	22	23	24	25	NCTC	Pts	Ref
2014	FDNY Racing	28	Chevy	DAY	MAR	KAN	CLT	DOV	TEX	GTW	KEN	IOW	ELD	POC	MCH	BRI; 36	MSP	CHI	NHA	LVS	TAL	MAR	TEX	PHO	HOM				70th	8	
2017	FDNY Racing	28	Chevy	DAY; DNQ	ATL	MAR	KAN	CLT	DOV	TEX	GTW	IOW	KEN	ELD	POC; 22	MCH	BRI	MSP	CHI	NHA	LVS	TAL	MAR	TEX	PHO	HOM			66th	15	
2018	FDNY Racing	28	Chevy	DAY; 18	ATL	LVS	MAR	DOV	KAN	CLT	TEX	IOW	GTW	CHI	KEN	ELD	POC	MCH	BRI	MSP	LVS	TAL; 8	MAR	TEX	PHO	HOM			45th	48	
2019	FDNY Racing	28	Chevy	DAY; 31	ATL	LVS	MAR	TEX	DOV	KAN	CLT	TEX	IOW	GTW	CHI	KEN	POC; 24	ELD	MCH	BRI	MSP	LVS	TAL; 17	MAR	PHO	HOM			55th	39	
2020	FDNY Racing	28	Chevy	DAY; 29	LVS	CLT; 34	ATL; 39	HOM	POC; 26	KEN	TEX	KAN; 37	KAN; 37	MCH	DRC	DOV	GTW	DAR	RCH	BRI	LVS	TAL; 21	KAN	TEX	MAR	PHO			46th	55	
2021	FDNY Racing	28	Chevy	DAY; 19	DRC	LVS	ATL	BRI	RCH	KAN	DAR	COA	CLT	TEX	NSH	POC; 34	KNX	GLN	GTW	DAR	BRI	LVS	TAL; 39	MAR	PHO				65th	22	
2022	FDNY Racing	28	Chevy	DAY; 23	LVS	ATL	COA	MAR	BRD	DAR	KAN	TEX	CLT	GTW	SON	KNX	NSH	MOH	POC; DNQ	IRP	RCH	KAN	BRI	TAL; 35	HOM	PHO			60th	16	
2023	FDNY Racing	28	Chevy	DAY; DNQ	LVS	ATL	COA	TEX	BRD	MAR	KAN	DAR	NWS	CLT	GTW	NSH	MOH	POC; DNQ	RCH	IRP	MLW	KAN	BRI	TAL; 36	HOM	PHO			83rd	1	
2024	FDNY Racing	28	Chevy	DAY; 9	ATL	LVS	BRI	COA	MAR	TEX	KAN	DAR	NWS	CLT	GTW	NSH; DNQ	POC; 34	IRP	RCH	MLW	BRI	KAN	TAL; QL^{†}	HOM	MAR	PHO			47th	31	
2025	FDNY Racing	28	Chevy	DAY; DNQ	ATL	LVS	HOM	MAR	BRI	CAR	TEX	KAN	NWS	CLT	NSH	MCH	POC; 35	LRP	IRP	GLN	RCH	DAR	BRI	NHA	ROV	TAL	MAR	PHO	75th	2	
2026	FDNY Racing	28	Chevy	DAY; DNQ	ATL	STP	DAR	CAR	BRI	TEX	GLN	DOV	CLT	NSH	MCH	COR	LRP	NWS	IRP	RCH	NHA	BRI	KAN	CLT	PHO	TAL; DNQ	MAR	HOM	124th	0	
^{†} – Qualified but replaced by Keith McGee

^{*} Season still in progress
^{1} Ineligible for series points

==== Whelen Modified Tour ====
NASCAR Whelen Modified Tour results
Year	Car owner	No.	Make	1	2	3	4	5	6	7	8	9	10	11	12	13	14	15	16	17	18	NWMTC	Pts	Ref
2010	Brother-In-Law Racing	97	Chevy	TMP	STA	STA	MAR; 28	NHA	LIM	MND	RIV	STA	TMP	BRI	NHA	STA	TMP					54th	79	
2013	Brother-In-Law Racing	97	Chevy	TMP	STA	STA	WFD	RIV	NHA; 28	MND	STA	TMP	BRI	RIV	NHA	STA	TMP					47th	17	
2016	Brother-In-Law Racing	97	Chevy	TMP	STA	WFD	STA	TMP	RIV	NHA; 22	MND	STA	TMP	BRI	RIV	OSW	SEE	NHA	STA	TMP		52nd	22	
2017	Brother-In-Law Racing	97	Chevy	MYR	TMP; 15	STA	LGY	TMP; 16	RIV	NHA; 20	STA	TMP	BRI; 12	SEE	OSW	RIV	NHA	STA	TMP			36th	113	
2018	Brother-In-Law Racing	97	Chevy	MYR	TMP; 23	STA	SEE	TMP	LGY	RIV	NHA; 20	STA	TMP	BRI	OSW	RIV	NHA	STA	TMP			50th	45	
2019	Brother-In-Law Racing	97	Chevy	MYR	SBO	TMP	STA	WAL	SEE	TMP	RIV	NHA; 27	STA	TMP	OSW	RIV	NHA	STA	TMP			69th	17	
2020	Brother-In-Law Racing	97	Chevy	JEN	WMM	WMM	JEN	MND	TMP	NHA; 21	STA	TMP										44th	23	
2021	Brother-In-Law Racing	97	Chevy	MAR; 18	STA	RIV	JEN	OSW	RIV	NHA; 23	NRP	STA	BEE	OSW	RCH; Wth	RIV	STA					45th	47	
2022	Brother-In-Law Racing	97	Chevy	NSM	RCH; 24	RIV	LEE	JEN	MND	RIV	WAL	NHA	CLM	TMP	LGY	OSW	RIV	TMP	MAR			58th	32	
2023	Brother-In-Law Racing	97	Chevy	NSM	RCH	MON	RIV	LEE	SEE	RIV	WAL	NHA; 26	LMP	THO	LGY	OSW	MON	RIV	NWS	THO	MAR	69th	32	
2024	Brother-In-Law Racing	97	Chevy	NSM	RCH	THO	MON	RIV	SEE	NHA	MON	LMP	THO	OSW	RIV	MON	THO	NWS	MAR; 21			63rd	23	

==== Whelen Southern Modified Tour ====
NASCAR Whelen Southern Modified Tour results
Year	Car owner	No.	Make	1	2	3	4	5	6	7	8	9	10	11	12	13	14	NSWMTC	Pts	Ref
2008	Brother-In-Law Racing	97	Chevy	CRW	ACE	CRW	BGS	CRW	LAN	CRW; 22	SNM	MAR; DNQ	CRW; 20	CRW				28th	318	
2009	Brother-In-Law Racing	97	Chevy	CON	SBO; 13	CRW; 17	LAN	CRW; 14	BGS; 5	BRI; 12			CRW; 13	CRW; 13	MAR; 13	ACE	CRW; 10	12th	1266	
2009	Brother-In-Law Racing	15	Chevy								CRW; 14	MBS						12th	1266	
2010	Brother-In-Law Racing	97	Chevy	ATL; 20	CRW; 14	SBO; 21	CRW; 15	BGS; 17	BRI; 7	CRW; 16	LGY; 11	TRI; 10	CLT; 15					12th	1197	
2011	Brother-In-Law Racing	97	Chevy	CRW	HCY	SBO	CRW	CRW	BGS	BRI	CRW	LGY	THO	TRI	CRW	CLT; 15	CRW	41st	118	
2012	Brother-In-Law Racing	97	Chevy	CRW; 22	CRW; 21	SBO; 24	CRW; 8	CRW; 16	BGS; 15	BRI; DNQ	LGY; 11	THO	CRW	CLT; 15				14th	247	
2013	Brother-In-Law Racing	97	Chevy	CRW; 10	SNM; 14	SBO; 16	CRW; 13	CRW; 11	BGS; 17	BRI; 7	LGY; 11	CRW; 13	CRW; 7	SNM; 17	CLT; 19			11th	373	
2014	Brother-In-Law Racing	97	Chevy	CRW; 15	SNM; 10	SBO; 11	LGY; DNQ	CRW; 8	BGS; 11	BRI; 10	LGY	CRW; 8	SBO; 18	SNM	CRW	CRW	CLT; 17	15th	315	
2016	Brother-In-Law Racing	97	Chevy	CRW; 11	CON; 15	SBO	CRW; 10	CRW	BGS; 6	BRI; 11	ECA	SBO; 11	CRW; 10	CLT; 11				11th	265	

=== ARCA Menards Series ===
(key) (Bold – Pole position awarded by qualifying time. Italics – Pole position earned by points standings or practice time. * – Most laps led. ** – All laps led.)

ARCA Menards Series results
Year	Team	No.	Make	1	2	3	4	5	6	7	8	9	10	11	12	13	14	15	16	17	18	19	20	AMSC	Pts	Ref
2014	Brother-In-Law Racing	57	Chevy	DAY	MOB	SLM	TAL; 26	TOL	NJE	POC	MCH	ELK	WIN	CHI	IRP	POC	BLN	ISF	MAD	DSF	SLM	KEN	KAN	131st	100	
2015	Brother-In-Law Racing	57	Chevy	DAY; DNQ	MOB	NSH	SLM	TAL	TOL	NJE	POC	MCH	CHI	WIN	IOW	IRP	POC	BLN	ISF	DSF	SLM	KEN	KAN	N/A	–	
2016	Brother-In-Law Racing	57	Chevy	DAY; 15	NSH	SLM	TAL; 15	TOL	NJE	POC	MCH	MAD	WIN	IOW	IRP	POC	BLN	ISF	DSF	SLM	CHI	KEN	KAN; 35	71st	330	
2017	Brother-In-Law Racing	11	Chevy	DAY; 38	NSH	SLM																		37th	590	
2017	Brother-In-Law Racing	57	Chevy				TAL; 23	TOL	ELK	POC	MCH	MAD	IOW	IRP	POC; 18	WIN	ISF	ROA	DSF	SLM	CHI; 17	KEN	KAN; 16	37th	590	
2018	Brother-In-Law Racing	57	Chevy	DAY; 33	NSH	SLM	TAL; 11	TOL	CLT; 27	POC	MCH	MAD	GTW	CHI	IOW	ELK	POC; 16	ISF; 12	BLN	DSF	SLM	IRP	KAN	30th	650	
2019	Brother-In-Law Racing	57	Chevy	DAY	FIF	SLM	TAL; 12	NSH	TOL	CLT; 13	POC	MCH	MAD	GTW	CHI	ELK	IOW	POC	ISF	DSF	SLM	IRP	KAN	53rd	335	
2020	Brother-In-Law Racing	57	Chevy	DAY	PHO	TAL	POC	IRP	KEN	IOW	KAN	TOL	TOL	MCH	DRC; DNS	GTW	L44	TOL	BRI	WIN	MEM	ISF	KAN	91st	3	
2021	Brother-In-Law Racing	57	Chevy	DAY	PHO	TAL; 18	KAN	TOL	CLT	MOH	POC; 20	ELK	BLN	IOW	WIN	GLN	MCH	ISF	MLW	DSF	BRI	SLM	KAN	67th	50	
2022	Brother-In-Law Racing	57	Chevy	DAY; 26	PHO	TAL; 30	KAN	CLT; 20	IOW	BLN	ELK	MOH	POC; 27	IRP	MCH	GLN	ISF	MLW	DSF	KAN	BRI	SLM	TOL	48th	73	
2023	Brother-In-Law Racing	75	Chevy	DAY; 21	PHO	TAL; 14	KAN	CLT; 18	BLN	ELK	MOH	IOW	POC; 23	MCH	IRP	GLN	ISF	MLW	DSF	KAN	BRI	SLM	TOL	38th	100	
2024	Brother-In-Law Racing	75	Chevy	DAY; QL^{†}	PHO	TAL	DOV	KAN	CLT	IOW	MOH	BLN	IRP	SLM	ELK	MCH	ISF	MLW	DSF	GLN	BRI	KAN	TOL	N/A	0	
2025	Brother-In-Law Racing	75	Chevy	DAY; 20	PHO	TAL; 18	KAN																	57th	78	
2025	Brother-In-Law Racing	57	Chevy					CLT; 16	MCH	BLN	ELK	LRP	DOV	IRP	IOW	GLN	ISF	MAD	DSF	BRI	SLM	KAN	TOL	57th	78	
2026	Brother-In-Law Racing	75	Chevy	DAY; 28	PHO	KAN	TAL; 37	GLN	TOL	MCH	POC	BER	ELK	CHI	LRP	IRP	IOW	ISF	MAD	DSF	SLM	BRI	KAN	117th	23	
^{†} – Qualified but replaced by Hunter Deshautelle

=== CARS Late Model Stock Car Tour ===
(key) (Bold – Pole position awarded by qualifying time. Italics – Pole position earned by points standings or practice time. * – Most laps led. ** – All laps led.)

CARS Late Model Stock Car Tour results
Year	Team	No.	Make	1	2	3	4	5	6	7	8	9	10	CLMSCTC	Pts	Ref
2015	Brother-In-Law Racing	97	N/A	SNM	ROU	HCY	SNM	TCM	MMS	ROU	CON; 16	MYB	HCY	49th	17	

=== SMART Modified Tour ===
SMART Modified Tour results
Year	Car owner	No.	Make	1	2	3	4	5	6	7	8	9	10	11	12	13	SMTC	Pts	Ref
2021	Brother-In-Law Racing	97	N/A	CRW	FLO; 12	SBO	FCS	CRW	DIL	CAR	CRW	DOM	PUL	HCY	ACE		43rd	19	
2022	Brother-In-Law Racing	97	N/A	FLO	SNM	CRW	SBO	FCS	CRW; 11	NWS	NWS	CAR	DOM	HCY	TRI	PUL	45th	20	
