= 2023 Sunset Hill Shooting Range 150 =

10th race of the 2023 ARCA Menards Series

Race details
- Race 10 of 20 of the 2023 ARCA Menards Series
- Date: July 22, 2023
- Official name: 38th Annual Sunset Hill Shooting Range 150
- Location: Pocono Raceway, Long Pond, Pennsylvania
- Course: Permanent racing facility
- Course length: 2.5 miles (4.0 km)
- Distance: 60 laps, 150 mi (241 km)
- Scheduled distance: 60 laps, 150 mi (241 km)
- Average speed: 109.868 mph (176.815 km/h)

Pole position
Driver	Dean Thompson	Venturini Motorsports
- Time: 53.763

Most laps led
Driver	Jesse Love	Venturini Motorsports
- Laps: 40

Winner
No. 20	Jesse Love	Venturini Motorsports

Television in the United States
- Network: FS1
- Announcers: Jamie Little, Phil Parsons, and Trevor Bayne

Radio in the United States
- Radio: MRN

The 2023 Sunset Hill Shooting Range 150 was the 10th stock car race of the 2023 ARCA Menards Series season, and the 38th iteration of the event. The race was originally going to be held on Friday, July 21, 2023, but due to rain showers, the race was postponed until Saturday, July 22. The race was held in Long Pond, Pennsylvania at Pocono Raceway, a 2.5 mile (4.0 km) permanent triangular-shaped racetrack. The race took the scheduled 60 laps to complete. Jesse Love, driving for Venturini Motorsports, would put on a dominating performance, leading a race-high 40 laps, and earning his seventh career ARCA Menards Series win, and his fifth of the season. To fill out the podium, Connor Mosack, driving for Joe Gibbs Racing, and Andrés Pérez de Lara, driving for Rev Racing, would finish 2nd and 3rd, respectively.

== Background ==
Pocono Raceway is a 2.5-mile (4.0 km) oval speedway located in Long Pond, Pennsylvania, which has hosted NASCAR racing annually since the early 1970s. Nicknamed "The Tricky Triangle", the speedway has three distinct corners and is known for high speeds along its lengthy straightaways.

From 1982 to 2019, the circuit had two race weekends. In 2020, the circuit was reduced to one race meeting of two races. The first race was moved to World Wide Technology Raceway near St. Louis starting in 2022.

=== Entry list ===
- (R) denotes rookie driver.

#	Driver	Team	Make	Sponsor
1	Jake Finch	Phoenix Racing	Toyota	Phoenix Construction
2	Andrés Pérez de Lara (R)	Rev Racing	Chevrolet	Max Siegel Inc.
03	Alex Clubb	Clubb Racing Inc.	Ford	Clubb Racing Inc.
06	A. J. Moyer	Wayne Peterson Racing	Toyota	River's Edge Cottages & RV Park
8	Sean Corr	Empire Racing	Chevrolet	NESCO, Navy Seal Foundation
10	Ed Pompa	Fast Track Racing	Toyota	HYTORC of New York, Double "H" Ranch
11	Stephanie Moyer	Fast Track Racing	Toyota	Fairway Subaru, Harry's U-Pull-It
12	Tim Monroe	Fast Track Racing	Ford	Fast Track Racing
15	Dean Thompson	Venturini Motorsports	Toyota	Thompson Pipe Group
18	Connor Mosack	Joe Gibbs Racing	Toyota	Mobil 1
20	Jesse Love	Venturini Motorsports	Toyota	JBL
25	Conner Jones	Venturini Motorsports	Toyota	Jones Utilities
30	Frankie Muniz (R)	Rette Jones Racing	Ford	Pond Lehocky
32	Christian Rose (R)	AM Racing	Ford	West Virginia Tourism
45	Don Thompson	Tamayo Cosentino Racing	Chevrolet	Tamayo Cosentino Racing
48	Brad Smith	Brad Smith Motorsports	Ford	Copraya.com
55	Toni Breidinger	Venturini Motorsports	Toyota	Pit Viper Sunglasses
63	Logan Misuraca	Spraker Racing Enterprises	Chevrolet	Celsius Energy Drink
66	Jon Garrett (R)	Veer Motorsports	Chevrolet	Venture Foods
69	Scott Melton	Kimmel Racing	Toyota	Melton-McFadden Insurance Agency
72	Cody Coughlin	Coughlin Brothers Racing	Ford	JEGS, Cody Coughlin Company
73	Andy Jankowiak	KLAS Motorsports	Toyota	Dak's Market
75	Bryan Dauzat	Brother-in-Law Racing	Chevrolet	O. B. Builders
87	Charles Buchanan	Charles Buchanan Racing	Ford	Spring Drug
97	Jason Kitzmiller	CR7 Motorsports	Chevrolet	A. L. L. Construction
Official entry list

== Practice ==
The first and only practice session was held on Friday, July 21, at 11:30 AM EST, and would last for 45 minutes. Jesse Love, driving for Venturini Motorsports, would set the fastest time in the session, with a lap of 54.168, and an average speed of 166.150 mph (267.393 km/h).

Pos.	#	Driver	Team	Make	Time	Speed
1	20	Jesse Love	Venturini Motorsports	Toyota	54.168	166.150
2	2	Andrés Pérez de Lara (R)	Rev Racing	Chevrolet	54.341	165.621
3	18	Connor Mosack	Joe Gibbs Racing	Toyota	54.500	165.138
Full practice results

== Qualifying ==
Qualifying was held on Friday, July 21, at 12:30 PM EST. The qualifying system used is a single-car, one-lap system with only one round. Whoever sets the fastest time in that round wins the pole. Dean Thompson, driving for Venturini Motorsports, would score the pole for the race, with a lap of 53.763, and an average speed of 167.401 mph (269.406 km/h).

Pos.	#	Driver	Team	Make	Time	Speed
1	15	Dean Thompson	Venturini Motorsports	Toyota	53.763	167.401
2	20	Jesse Love	Venturini Motorsports	Toyota	53.855	167.115
3	2	Andrés Pérez de Lara (R)	Rev Racing	Chevrolet	54.413	165.402
4	1	Jake Finch	Phoenix Racing	Toyota	54.751	164.381
5	18	Connor Mosack	Joe Gibbs Racing	Toyota	54.895	163.949
6	55	Toni Breidinger	Venturini Motorsports	Toyota	55.060	163.458
7	73	Andy Jankowiak	KLAS Motorsports	Toyota	55.433	162.358
8	25	Conner Jones	Venturini Motorsports	Toyota	55.457	162.288
9	72	Cody Coughlin	Coughlin Brothers Racing	Ford	55.586	161.911
10	30	Frankie Muniz (R)	Rette Jones Racing	Ford	55.916	160.956
11	97	Jason Kitzmiller	CR7 Motorsports	Chevrolet	56.117	160.379
12	8	Sean Corr	Empire Racing	Chevrolet	56.340	159.744
13	66	Jon Garrett (R)	Veer Motorsports	Chevrolet	57.626	156.180
14	10	Ed Pompa	Fast Track Racing	Toyota	57.949	155.309
15	69	Scott Melton	Kimmel Racing	Toyota	58.295	154.387
16	87	Charles Buchanan	Charles Buchanan Racing	Ford	59.258	151.878
17	11	Stephanie Moyer	Fast Track Racing	Toyota	59.511	151.233
18	75	Bryan Dauzat	Brother-in-Law Racing	Chevrolet	1:00.882	147.827
19	12	Tim Monroe	Fast Track Racing	Ford	1:02.671	144.967
20	63	Logan Misuraca	Spraker Racing Enterprises	Chevrolet	1:02.762	143.502
21	03	Alex Clubb	Clubb Racing Inc.	Ford	1:03.622	141.461
22	06	A. J. Moyer	Wayne Peterson Racing	Toyota	1:05.966	136.544
23	45	Don Thompson	Tamayo Cosentino Racing	Chevrolet	1:07.648	133.042
24	48	Brad Smith	Brad Smith Motorsports	Ford	1:14.400	121.049
25	32	Christian Rose (R)	AM Racing	Ford	–	–
Official qualifying results

== Race results ==
Fin	St	#	Driver	Team	Make	Laps	Led	Status	Pts
1	2	20	Jesse Love	Venturini Motorsports	Toyota	60	40	Running	48
2	5	18	Connor Mosack	Joe Gibbs Racing	Toyota	60	0	Running	42
3	3	2	Andrés Pérez de Lara (R)	Rev Racing	Chevrolet	60	16	Running	42
4	1	15	Dean Thompson	Venturini Motorsports	Toyota	60	0	Running	41
5	8	25	Conner Jones	Venturini Motorsports	Toyota	60	0	Running	39
6	6	55	Toni Breidinger	Venturini Motorsports	Toyota	60	0	Running	38
7	7	73	Andy Jankowiak	KLAS Motorsports	Toyota	60	0	Running	37
8	9	72	Cody Coughlin	Coughlin Brothers Racing	Ford	60	0	Running	36
9	25	32	Christian Rose (R)	AM Racing	Ford	60	0	Running	35
10	4	1	Jake Finch	Phoenix Racing	Toyota	60	0	Running	34
11	11	97	Jason Kitzmiller	CR7 Motorsports	Chevrolet	60	0	Running	33
12	13	66	Jon Garrett (R)	Veer Motorsports	Chevrolet	60	1	Running	33
13	15	69	Scott Melton	Kimmel Racing	Toyota	60	0	Running	31
14	17	11	Stephanie Moyer	Fast Track Racing	Toyota	60	0	Running	30
15	14	10	Ed Pompa	Fast Track Racing	Toyota	59	0	Running	29
16	22	06	A. J. Moyer	Wayne Peterson Racing	Toyota	56	0	Running	28
17	24	48	Brad Smith	Brad Smith Motorsports	Ford	55	0	Running	27
18	16	87	Charles Buchanan	Charles Buchanan Racing	Ford	52	0	Mechanical	26
19	21	03	Alex Clubb	Clubb Racing Inc.	Ford	51	3	Running	26
20	12	8	Sean Corr	Empire Racing	Chevrolet	47	0	Mechanical	24
21	10	30	Frankie Muniz (R)	Rette Jones Racing	Ford	47	0	Running	23
22	23	45	Don Thompson	Tamayo Cosentino Racing	Chevrolet	31	0	Mechanical	22
23	18	75	Bryan Dauzat	Brother-in-Law Racing	Chevrolet	18	0	Accident	21
24	19	12	Tim Monroe	Fast Track Racing	Ford	11	0	Mechanical	20
25	20	63	Logan Misuraca	Spraker Racing Enterprises	Chevrolet	7	0	Accident	19
Official race results

== Standings after the race ==
Drivers' Championship standings

	Pos	Driver	Points
	1	Jesse Love	516
1	2	Andrés Pérez de Lara	446 (-70)
1	3	Frankie Muniz	442 (-74)
	4	Christian Rose	428 (-88)
	5	Jon Garrett	386 (-130)
2	6	A. J. Moyer	347 (-169)
1	7	Toni Breidinger	341 (-175)
2	8	Brad Smith	331 (-185)
2	9	Tony Cosentino	276 (-240)
1	10	Jack Wood	254 (-261)

- Note: Only the first 10 positions are included for the driver standings.

Previous race: 2023 Calypso Lemonade 150	ARCA Menards Series; 2023 season	Next race: 2023 Henry Ford Health 200
