= 2022 General Tire 200 (Talladega) =

Third race of the 2022 ARCA Menards Series

Race details
- Race 3 of 20 of the 2022 ARCA Menards Series
- Date: April 23, 2022
- Official name: General Tire 200
- Location: Lincoln, Alabama, Talladega Superspeedway
- Course: Permanent racing facility
- Course length: 2.66 miles (4.281 km)
- Distance: 68 laps, 180.88 mi (291.1 km)
- Scheduled distance: 76 laps, 202.16 mi (325.3 km)
- Average speed: 118.761 mph (191.127 km/h)

Pole position
Driver	Drew Dollar	Kyle Busch Motorsports
- Time: Set by 2021 owner's points and provisionals

Most laps led
Driver	Drew Dollar	Kyle Busch Motorsports
- Laps: 50

Winner
No. 2	Nick Sanchez	Rev Racing

Television in the United States
- Network: Fox Sports 1
- Announcers: Jamie Little, Austin Cindric, Phil Parsons

Radio in the United States
- Radio: Motor Racing Network

The 2022 General Tire 200 was the third stock car race of the 2022 ARCA Menards Series season, and the 60th iteration of the event. The race was held on Saturday, April 23, 2022, in Lincoln, Alabama at Talladega Superspeedway, a 2.66 mile (4 km) permanent triangle-shaped superspeedway. The race was decreased from 76 laps to 68 laps, due to a time restraint with the NASCAR Xfinity Series race. At race's end, Nick Sanchez of Rev Racing would win, after Daniel Dye spun on the backstretch with 9 laps to go. This was Sanchez's second career ARCA Menards Series win, and his first of the season. To fill out the podium, Bret Holmes of Bret Holmes Racing and Corey Heim of Venturini Motorsports would finish 2nd and 3rd, respectively.

The race was marred by a crash involving several drivers, including Richard Garvie, Brayton Laster, Toni Breidinger, Eric Caudell, Scott Melton, Tim Richmond, and barely Ryan Huff. Garvie's car would clip the front of Laster's car, and would result in a near flip for Garvie. Eric Caudell slid across the track, as he tried to avoid the wreck. As he came up onto the track, he would get t-boned by Scott Melton, Ryan Huff would barely get involved in the accident, but would manage an 8th place finish. Safety personnel had to get Melton out of the car, and was taken to a local hospital on a stretcher.

== Background ==
Talladega Superspeedway, nicknamed “Dega”, and formerly named Alabama International Motor Speedway (AIMS), is a motorsports complex located north of Talladega, Alabama. It is located on the former Anniston Air Force Base in the small city of Lincoln. A tri-oval, the track was constructed in 1969 by the International Speedway Corporation, a business controlled by the France Family. As of 2021, the track hosts the NASCAR Cup Series, NASCAR Xfinity Series, NASCAR Camping World Truck Series, and ARCA Menards Series. Talladega is the longest NASCAR oval, with a length of 2.66 miles (4.281 km), compared to the Daytona International Speedway, which is 2.5 miles (4.0 km) long. The total peak capacity of Talladega is around 175,000 spectators, with the main grandstand capacity being about 80,000.

=== Entry list ===
- (R) denotes rookie driver

#	Driver	Team	Make	Sponsor
0	A. J. Moyer	Wayne Peterson Racing	Ford	GreatRailing.com
01	Tim Monroe	Fast Track Racing	Ford	Fast Track Racing
2	Nick Sanchez	Rev Racing	Chevrolet	Max Siegel Inc.
03	Brayton Laster	Mullins Racing	Ford	Indy Auto Recyclers
3	Willie Mullins	Mullins Racing	Chevrolet	CorvetteParts.net, Crow Wing Recycling
06	Zachary Tinkle	Wayne Peterson Racing	Ford	GreatRailing.com
6	Rajah Caruth (R)	Rev Racing	Chevrolet	Max Siegel Inc.
07	Brian Kaltreider	Kaltreider Motorsports	Ford	Superior Walls
7	Eric Caudell	CCM Racing	Ford	Red Tide Canopies, Coble Enterprises
8	Sean Corr	Empire Racing	Chevrolet	Transtec, NESCO
9	Thomas Praytor	Max Force Racing	Chevrolet	Alabama Institute for the Deaf and Blind
10	Richard Garvie	Fast Track Racing	Toyota	Rugietfast.com
11	Jon Garrett	Fast Track Racing	Ford	Fort Worth Screen Printing
12	D. L. Wilson	Fast Track Racing	Chevrolet	Wilson Traditional Metals
15	Parker Chase	Venturini Motorsports	Toyota	Vertical Bridge
18	Drew Dollar	Kyle Busch Motorsports	Toyota	Lynx Capital
20	Corey Heim	Venturini Motorsports	Toyota	Crescent Tools
23	Bret Holmes	Bret Holmes Racing	Chevrolet	Golden Eagle Syrup
25	Toni Breidinger (R)	Venturini Motorsports	Toyota	HairClub
27	Tim Richmond	Richmond Motorsports	Toyota	Circle Track Warehouse
30	Amber Balcaen (R)	Rette Jones Racing	Ford	ICON Direct
32	Max Gutiérrez	Rette Jones Racing	Chevrolet	Toughbuilt
35	Greg Van Alst	Greg Van Alst Motorsports	Chevrolet	CB Fabricating
36	Ryan Huff	Huff Racing	Ford	South Eastern Services, H&H Excavation
43	Daniel Dye (R)	GMS Racing	Chevrolet	Heise LED Lighting Systems
44	Thad Moffitt	Ferrier-McClure Racing	Chevrolet	Clean Harbors, Team Construction
48	Brad Smith	Brad Smith Motorsports	Chevrolet	PSST... Copraya Websites
55	Gus Dean	Venturini Motorsports	Toyota	Venturini Motorsports
57	Bryan Dauzat	Brother-in-Law Racing	Chevrolet	Brother-in-Law Racing
63	Dave Mader III**	Spraker Racing Enterprises	Chevrolet	Diamond C Ranch, American Apparel
69	Scott Melton	Kimmel Racing	Ford	Melton McFadden Insurance Agency
73	Andy Jankowiak	Jankowiak Motorsports	Ford	Whelen
94	Bryce Haugeberg	Haugeberg Racing	Toyota	Magnum Contracting
97	Jason Kitzmiller	CR7 Motorsports	Chevrolet	A. L. L. Construction
Official entry list

**Withdrew prior to the event.

== Practice ==
The only 60-minute practice was held on Friday, April 22, at 3:00 PM CST. Willie Mullins of Mullins Racing was the fastest in the session, with a time of 53.494 seconds and a time of 179.011 mph (288.090 km/h).

Pos.	#	Driver	Team	Make	Time	Speed
1	3	Willie Mullins	Mullins Racing	Chevrolet	53.494	179.011
2	35	Greg Van Alst	Greg Van Alst Motorsports	Chevrolet	53.509	178.961
3	18	Drew Dollar	Kyle Busch Motorsports	Toyota	53.517	178.934
Full practice results

== Starting lineup ==
No qualifying session will be held; instead, the lineup will be determined by the previous season's owner's points and provisionals. As a result, Drew Dollar of Kyle Busch Motorsports won the pole.

Pos.	#	Driver	Team	Make
1	18	Drew Dollar	Kyle Busch Motorsports	Toyota
2	20	Corey Heim	Venturini Motorsports	Toyota
3	15	Parker Chase	Venturini Motorsports	Toyota
4	2	Nick Sanchez	Rev Racing	Chevrolet
5	25	Toni Breidinger (R)	Venturini Motorsports	Toyota
6	10	Richard Garvie	Fast Track Racing	Toyota
7	27	Tim Richmond	Richmond Motorsports	Toyota
8	11	Jon Garrett	Fast Track Racing	Ford
9	12	D. L. Wilson	Fast Track Racing	Chevrolet
10	01	Tim Monroe	Fast Track Racing	Ford
11	48	Brad Smith	Brad Smith Motorsports	Chevrolet
12	43	Daniel Dye (R)	GMS Racing	Chevrolet
13	30	Amber Balcaen (R)	Rette Jones Racing	Ford
14	06	Zachary Tinkle	Wayne Peterson Racing	Chevrolet
15	69	Scott Melton	Kimmel Racing	Ford
16	23	Bret Holmes	Bret Holmes Racing	Chevrolet
17	35	Greg Van Alst	Greg Van Alst Motorsports	Chevrolet
18	73	Andy Jankowiak	Jankowiak Motorsports	Ford
19	6	Rajah Caruth (R)	Rev Racing	Chevrolet
20	97	Jason Kitzmiller	CR7 Motorsports	Chevrolet
21	7	Eric Caudell	CCM Racing	Ford
22	55	Gus Dean	Venturini Motorsports	Toyota
23	8	Sean Corr	Empire Racing	Chevrolet
24	32	Max Gutiérrez	Rette Jones Racing	Chevrolet
25	44	Thad Moffitt	Ferrier-McClure Racing	Chevrolet
26	36	Ryan Huff	Huff Racing	Ford
27	57	Bryan Dauzat	Brother-in-Law Racing	Chevrolet
28	3	Willie Mullins	Mullins Racing	Chevrolet
29	9	Thomas Praytor	Max Force Racing	Chevrolet
30	94	Bryce Haugeberg	Haugeberg Racing	Toyota
31	03	Brayton Laster	Mullins Racing	Ford
32	07	Brian Kaltreider	Kaltreider Motorsports	Ford
33	0	A. J. Moyer	Wayne Peterson Racing	Ford
Official starting lineup

== Race results ==
Fin.	St.	#	Driver	Team	Make	Laps	Led	Status	Pts
1	4	2	Nick Sanchez	Rev Racing	Chevrolet	68	1	Running	47
2	16	23	Bret Holmes	Bret Holmes Racing	Chevrolet	68	0	Running	42
3	2	20	Corey Heim	Venturini Motorsports	Toyota	68	11	Running	43
4	25	44	Thad Moffitt	Ferrier-McClure Racing	Chevrolet	68	0	Running	40
5	24	55	Gus Dean	Venturini Motorsports	Toyota	68	0	Running	39
6	19	6	Rajah Caruth (R)	Rev Racing	Chevrolet	68	6	Running	39
7	1	18	Drew Dollar	Kyle Busch Motorsports	Toyota	68	50	Running	40
8	26	36	Ryan Huff	Huff Racing	Ford	68	0	Running	36
9	3	15	Parker Chase	Venturini Motorsports	Toyota	68	0	Running	35
10	24	32	Max Gutiérrez	Rette Jones Racing	Chevrolet	68	0	Running	34
11	17	35	Greg Van Alst	Greg Van Alst Motorsports	Chevrolet	68	0	Running	33
12	13	30	Amber Balcaen (R)	Rette Jones Racing	Ford	68	0	Running	32
13	18	73	Andy Jankowiak	Jankowiak Motorsports	Ford	68	0	Running	31
14	20	97	Jason Kitzmiller	CR7 Motorsports	Chevrolet	68	0	Running	30
15	28	3	Willie Mullins	Mullins Racing	Chevrolet	68	0	Running	29
16	9	12	D. L. Wilson	Fast Track Racing	Chevrolet	68	0	Running	28
17	12	43	Daniel Dye (R)	GMS Racing	Chevrolet	68	0	Running	27
18	30	94	Bryce Haugeberg	Haugeberg Racing	Toyota	68	0	Running	26
19	29	9	Thomas Praytor (Note: During the middle of the race, Sean Corr took over the No. 9 car due to unspecified reasons. Since Praytor started the race, he is officially credited with the 19th place finish.)	Max Force Racing	Chevrolet	67	0	Running	25
20	14	06	Zachary Tinkle	Wayne Peterson Racing	Chevrolet	67	0	Running	24
21	8	11	Jon Garrett	Fast Track Racing	Ford	66	0	Running	23
22	11	48	Brad Smith	Brad Smith Motorsports	Chevrolet	66	0	Running	22
23	33	0	A. J. Moyer	Wayne Peterson Racing	Ford	61	0	Running	21
24	5	25	Toni Breidinger (R)	Venturini Motorsports	Toyota	48	0	Accident	20
25	6	10	Richard Garvie	Fast Track Racing	Toyota	48	0	Accident	19
26	31	03	Brayton Laster	Mullins Racing	Ford	48	0	Running	18
27	21	7	Eric Caudell	CCM Racing	Ford	48	0	Accident	17
28	15	69	Scott Melton	Kimmel Racing	Ford	48	0	Accident	16
29	7	27	Tim Richmond	Richmond Motorsports	Toyota	48	0	Accident	15
30	27	57	Bryan Dauzat	Brother-in-Law Racing	Chevrolet	36	0	Running	14
31	23	8	Sean Corr (Note: During the middle of the race, Sean Corr took over Thomas Praytor's No. 9 car due to unspecified reasons. Since Corr started the race in his No. 8 car, he is officially credited with the 31st place finish.)	Empire Racing	Chevrolet	17	0	Engine	13
32	32	07	Brian Kaltreider	Kaltreider Motorsports	Ford	9	0	Engine	12
33	10	01	Tim Monroe	Fast Track Racing	Ford	4	0	Rear end	11
Official race results

== Standings after the race ==
Drivers' Championship standings

	Pos	Driver	Points
1	1	Rajah Caruth	112
1	2	Daniel Dye	111 (-1)
2	3	Nick Sanchez	108 (-4)
1	4	Parker Chase	101 (-11)
1	5	Corey Heim	92 (-20)
2	6	Toni Breidinger	84 (-28)
5	7	Gus Dean	78 (-34)
1	8	Amber Balcaen	74 (-38)
12	9	Ryan Huff	70 (-42)
4	10	Andy Jankowiak	69 (-43)

- Note: Only the first 10 positions are included for the driver standings.

Previous race: 2022 General Tire 150 (Phoenix)	ARCA Menards Series; 2022 season	Next race: 2022 Dutch Boy 150
