= 2022 General Tire Delivers 200 =

Tenth race of the 2022 ARCA Menards Series

Race details
- Race 10 of 20 of the 2022 ARCA Menards Series
- Date: July 22, 2022
- Official name: 37th Annual General Tire Delivers 200
- Location: Pocono Raceway, Long Pond, Pennsylvania
- Course: Permanent racing facility
- Course length: 2.5 miles (4.0 km)
- Distance: 64 laps,
- Scheduled distance: 80 laps, 200 mi (321.9 km)
- Average speed: 91.734 mph (147.632 km/h)

Pole position
Driver	Sammy Smith	Kyle Busch Motorsports
- Time: 53.610

Most laps led
Driver	Taylor Gray	David Gilliland Racing
- Laps: 38

Winner
No. 17	Taylor Gray	David Gilliland Racing

Television in the United States
- Network: Fox Sports 1
- Announcers: Jamie Little, Trevor Bayne, Phil Parsons

Radio in the United States
- Radio: Motor Racing Network

The 2022 General Tire Delivers 200 was the tenth stock car race of the 2022 ARCA Menards Series season, and the 37th iteration of the event. The race was held on Friday, July 22, 2022, in Long Pond, Pennsylvania at Pocono Raceway, a 2.5 mile (4.0 km) permanent triangular-shaped racetrack. The race was decreased from 80 laps to 64 laps, due to increasing darkness. Taylor Gray, driving for David Gilliland Racing, would win the race, after leading the race when the final caution came out with 16 laps to go, which was a spin from Jesse Love. Gray would also lead 38 laps. This was Gray's third career ARCA Menards Series, and his third of the season. To fill out the podium, Nick Sanchez, driving for Rev Racing, and Brandon Jones, driving for Joe Gibbs Racing, would finish 2nd and 3rd, respectively.

== Background ==
Pocono Raceway (formerly Pocono International Raceway), also known as The Tricky Triangle, is a superspeedway located in the Pocono Mountains in Long Pond, Pennsylvania. It is the site of three NASCAR national series races and an ARCA Menards Series event in July: a NASCAR Cup Series race with support events by the NASCAR Xfinity Series and NASCAR Camping World Truck Series. From 1971 to 1989, and from 2013 to 2019, the track also hosted an Indy Car race, currently sanctioned by the IndyCar Series. Additionally, from 1982 to 2021, it hosted two NASCAR Cup Series races, with the traditional first date being removed for 2022.

Pocono is one of the few NASCAR tracks not owned by either NASCAR or Speedway Motorsports, the dominant track owners in NASCAR. Pocono CEO Nick Igdalsky and president Ben May are members of the family-owned Mattco Inc, started by Joseph II and Rose Mattioli. Mattco also owns South Boston Speedway in South Boston, Virginia.

Outside NASCAR and IndyCar Series races, Pocono is used throughout the year by the Stock Car Experience, Bertil Roos Driving School, Sports Car Club of America (SCCA) as well as many other clubs and organizations. The triangular track also has three separate infield sections of racetrack – the north course, east course and south course. Each of these infield sections use separate portions of the track or can be combined for longer and more technical course configurations. In total Pocono Raceway has offers 22 different road course configurations ranging from .5 miles to 3.65 miles in length. During regular non-race weekends, multiple clubs or driving schools can use the track simultaneously by running on different infield sections. All of the infield sections can also be run in either clockwise or counter clockwise direction which doubles the 22 course configuration to 44 total course options.

=== Entry list ===
- (R) denotes rookie driver

#	Driver	Team	Make	Sponsor
01	Stephanie Moyer	Fast Track Racing	Toyota	WeGotUsed.com
02	Kris Wright	Young's Motorsports	Chevrolet	Big Dog Energy
2	Nick Sanchez	Rev Racing	Chevrolet	Max Siegel Inc.
03	Alex Clubb	Clubb Racing Inc.	Ford	Clubb Racing Inc.
06	Zachary Tinkle	Wayne Peterson Racing	Chevrolet	Pipe Works
6	Rajah Caruth (R)	Rev Racing	Chevrolet	Max Siegel Inc.
8	Sean Corr	Empire Racing	Chevrolet	The Trans Group
10	Jon Garrett	Fast Track Racing	Chevrolet	Rock Creek Distillery
11	Bryce Haugeberg	Fast Track Racing	Chevrolet	Magnum Contracting
12	D. L. Wilson	Fast Track Racing	Chevrolet	Dansby’s Tokio Store
15	Parker Chase	Venturini Motorsports	Toyota	Vertical Bridge
17	Taylor Gray	David Gilliland Racing	Ford	Ford Performance
18	Sammy Smith (R)	Kyle Busch Motorsports	Toyota	TMC Transportation
20	Jesse Love (R)	Venturini Motorsports	Toyota	Crescent Tools
23	Connor Mosack	Bret Holmes Racing	Chevrolet	Nic Tailor Custom Underwear
25	Toni Breidinger (R)	Venturini Motorsports	Toyota	HairClub
30	Amber Balcaen (R)	Rette Jones Racing	Ford	ICON Direct
35	Greg Van Alst	Greg Van Alst Motorsports	Ford	CB Fabricating
42	Christian Rose	Cook Racing Technologies	Chevrolet	West Virginia Tourism
43	Daniel Dye (R)	GMS Racing	Chevrolet	Champion Container
44	Ed Pompa	Fast Track Racing	Toyota	Vampire State LLC, Double H Ranch
48	Brad Smith	Brad Smith Motorsports	Chevrolet	PSST...Copraya Websites
55	Jake Finch	Venturini Motorsports	Toyota	Phoenix Construction
57	Bryan Dauzat	Brother-In-Law Racing	Chevrolet	Brother-In-Law Racing
69	Scott Melton	Kimmel Racing	Toyota	Melton McFadden Insurance, Donna’s Donuts
73	Andy Jankowiak	Jankowiak Motorsports	Toyota	Planter Box
81	Brandon Jones	Joe Gibbs Racing	Toyota	Watts, Menards
97	Jason Kitzmiller	CR7 Motorsports	Chevrolet	A. L. L. Construction
Official entry list

== Pre-race practice ==
A pre-race practice session was held on Thursday, July 21, at 9:00 AM EST, and would last for five hours. Nick Sanchez, driving for Rev Racing, was the fastest in the session, with a lap of 54.059, and an average speed of 166.485 mph (267.932 km/h).

Pos.	#	Driver	Team	Make	Time	Speed
1	2	Nick Sanchez	Rev Racing	Chevrolet	54.059	166.485
2	18	Sammy Smith (R)	Kyle Busch Motorsports	Toyota	54.375	165.517
3	6	Rajah Caruth (R)	Rev Racing	Chevrolet	54.446	165.301
Full pre-race practice results

== Practice ==
The official 35-minute practice session was held on Friday, July 22, at 2:45 PM EST. Sammy Smith, driving for Kyle Busch Motorsports, was the fastest in the session, with a lap of 53.618 seconds, and an average speed of 167.879 mph (270.175 km/h).

Pos.	#	Driver	Team	Make	Time	Speed
1	18	Sammy Smith (R)	Kyle Busch Motorsports	Toyota	53.610	167.879
2	17	Taylor Gray	David Gilliland Racing	Ford	54.005	166.651
3	20	Jesse Love (R)	Venturini Motorsports	Toyota	54.386	165.484
Full practice results

== Qualifying ==
Qualifying was scheduled to be held on Friday, July 22, at 3:30 PM EST. The qualifying system used is a multiple-car, multiple-lap system with only one round. Whoever sets the fastest time in the round wins the pole.

Qualifying was cancelled due to inclement weather. The startling lineup would be based on the times from practice. As a result, Sammy Smith, driving for Kyle Busch Motorsports, would earn the pole.

Pos.	#	Name	Team	Make	Time	Speed
1	18	Sammy Smith (R)	Kyle Busch Motorsports	Toyota	53.610	167.879
2	17	Taylor Gray	David Gilliland Racing	Ford	54.005	166.651
3	20	Jesse Love (R)	Venturini Motorsports	Toyota	54.386	165.484
4	6	Rajah Caruth (R)	Rev Racing	Chevrolet	54.759	164.357
5	2	Nick Sanchez	Rev Racing	Chevrolet	54.770	164.324
6	81	Brandon Jones	Joe Gibbs Racing	Toyota	55.008	163.613
7	23	Connor Mosack	Bret Holmes Racing	Chevrolet	55.037	163.526
8	55	Jake Finch	Venturini Motorsports	Toyota	55.043	163.509
9	43	Daniel Dye (R)	GMS Racing	Chevrolet	55.565	161.972
10	02	Kris Wright	Young's Motorsports	Chevrolet	55.650	161.725
11	30	Amber Balcaen (R)	Rette Jones Racing	Ford	55.958	160.835
12	15	Parker Chase	Venturini Motorsports	Toyota	56.166	160.239
13	35	Greg Van Alst	Greg Van Alst Motorsports	Ford	56.310	159.830
14	42	Christian Rose	Cook Racing Technologies	Toyota	56.330	159.773
15	73	Andy Jankowiak	Jankowiak Motorsports	Ford	56.581	159.064
16	97	Jason Kitzmiller	CR7 Motorsports	Chevrolet	56.932	158.083
17	8	Sean Corr	Empire Racing	Chevrolet	57.285	157.109
18	25	Toni Breidinger (R)	Venturini Motorsports	Toyota	57.776	155.774
19	69	Scott Melton	Kimmel Racing	Toyota	57.794	155.726
20	57	Bryan Dauzat	Brother-in-Law Racing	Chevrolet	58.255	154.493
21	10	Jon Garrett	Fast Track Racing	Chevrolet	58.633	153.497
22	11	Bryce Haugeberg	Fast Track Racing	Chevrolet	59.074	152.351
23	01	Stephanie Moyer	Fast Track Racing	Toyota	59.287	151.804
24	44	Ed Pompa	Fast Track Racing	Toyota	59.662	150.850
25	06	Zachary Tinkle	Wayne Peterson Racing	Chevrolet	1:00.144	149.641
26	48	Brad Smith	Brad Smith Motorsports	Chevrolet	1:03.246	142.301
27	03	Alex Clubb	Clubb Racing Inc.	Ford	1:03.429	141.891
28	12	D. L. Wilson	Fast Track Racing	Chevrolet	1:03.782	141.106
Official starting lineup

== Race results ==
Fin.	St	#	Driver	Team	Make	Laps	Led	Status	Pts
1	2	17	Taylor Gray	David Gilliland Racing	Ford	64	38	Running	48
2	5	2	Nick Sanchez	Rev Racing	Chevrolet	64	13	Running	43
3	6	81	Brandon Jones	Joe Gibbs Racing	Toyota	64	0	Running	41
4	4	6	Rajah Caruth (R)	Rev Racing	Chevrolet	64	0	Running	40
5	9	43	Daniel Dye (R)	GMS Racing	Chevrolet	64	0	Running	39
6	7	23	Connor Mosack	Bret Holmes Racing	Chevrolet	64	5	Running	39
7	8	55	Jake Finch	Venturini Motorsports	Toyota	64	0	Running	37
8	10	02	Kris Wright	Young's Motorsports	Chevrolet	64	0	Running	36
9	16	97	Jason Kitzmiller	CR7 Motorsports	Chevrolet	64	0	Running	35
10	18	25	Toni Breidinger (R)	Venturini Motorsports	Toyota	64	0	Running	34
11	19	69	Scott Melton	Kimmel Racing	Toyota	64	0	Running	33
12	1	18	Sammy Smith (R)	Kyle Busch Motorsports	Toyota	63	0	Running	32
13	3	20	Jesse Love (R)	Venturini Motorsports	Toyota	63	8	Running	32
14	21	10	Jon Garrett	Fast Track Racing	Chevrolet	62	0	Running	30
15	13	35	Greg Van Alst	Greg Van Alst Motorsports	Ford	62	0	Running	29
16	22	11	Bryce Haugeberg	Fast Track Racing	Chevrolet	61	0	Running	28
17	26	48	Brad Smith	Brad Smith Motorsports	Chevrolet	60	0	Running	27
18	12	15	Parker Chase	Venturini Motorsports	Toyota	58	0	Running	26
19	23	01	Stephanie Moyer	Fast Track Racing	Toyota	58	0	Running	25
20	24	44	Ed Pompa	Fast Track Racing	Toyota	52	0	Accident	24
21	11	30	Amber Balcaen (R)	Rette Jones Racing	Ford	49	0	Accident	23
22	17	8	Sean Corr	Empire Racing	Chevrolet	49	0	Accident	22
23	15	73	Andy Jankowiak	Jankowiak Motorsports	Ford	49	0	Accident	21
24	14	42	Christian Rose	Cook Racing Technologies	Chevrolet	32	0	Electrical	20
25	28	12	D. L. Wilson	Fast Track Racing	Chevrolet	32	0	Electrical	19
26	25	06	Zachary Tinkle	Wayne Peterson Racing	Chevrolet	19	0	Accident	18
27	20	57	Bryan Dauzat	Brother-in-Law Racing	Chevrolet	7	0	Radiator	17
28	27	03	Alex Clubb	Clubb Racing Inc.	Ford	7	0	Oil Cooler	16
Official race results

== Standings after the race ==
Drivers' Championship standings

	Pos	Driver	Points
	1	Rajah Caruth	430
	2	Nick Sanchez	428 (-2)
	3	Daniel Dye	421 (-9)
	4	Toni Breidinger	366 (-64)
	5	Greg Van Alst	358 (-72)
	6	Amber Balcaen	342 (-88)
	7	Brad Smith	294 (-136)
	8	Zachary Tinkle	266 (-164)
	9	Sammy Smith	258 (-172)
1	10	Taylor Gray	249 (-181)

- Note: Only the first 10 positions are included for the driver standings.

Previous race: 2022 Dawn 150	ARCA Menards Series; 2022 season	Next race: 2022 Reese's 200
