= 2022 Calypso Lemonade 150 =

Sixth race of the 2022 ARCA Menards Series

Race details
- Race 6 of 20 of the 2022 ARCA Menards Series; Race 5 of 7 of the 2022 ARCA Menards Series East; Race 2 of 10 of the 2022 Sioux Chief Showdown
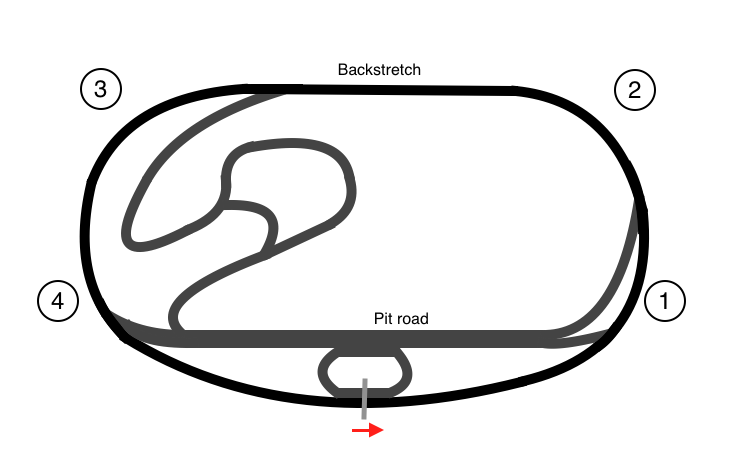
- Date: June 11–12, 2022
- Official name: 16th Annual Calypso Lemonade 150
- Location: Newton, Iowa, Iowa Speedway
- Course: Permanent racing facility
- Course length: 0.875 miles (1.408 km)
- Distance: 150 laps, 131.25 mi (211.226 km)
- Scheduled distance: 150 laps, 131.25 mi (211.226 km)
- Average speed: 90.500 mph (145.646 km/h)

Pole position
Driver	Jesse Love	Venturini Motorsports
- Time: 24.437

Most laps led
Driver	Sammy Smith	Kyle Busch Motorsports
- Laps: 64

Winner
No. 81	Brandon Jones	Joe Gibbs Racing

Television in the United States
- Network: MAVTV
- Announcers: Krista Voda, Jim Tretow

Radio in the United States
- Radio: ARCA

The 2022 Calypso Lemonade 150 was the sixth stock car race of the 2022 ARCA Menards Series season, the fifth race of the 2022 ARCA Menards Series East season, the second race of the 2022 Sioux Chief Showdown, and the 16th iteration of the event. The first part of the race was held on Saturday, June 11, 2022, but because of inclement weather, the rest of the race was held on Sunday, June 12. It was held in Newton, Iowa at Iowa Speedway, a 0.875 mile (1.408 km) permanent oval-shaped racetrack. The race took the scheduled 150 laps to complete. Brandon Jones, driving for Joe Gibbs Racing, took the lead away from Sammy Smith with 18 laps to go, and would earn his 7th career ARCA Menards Series win, his 2nd career ARCA Menards Series East win, and his second win of the season. To fill out the podium, Connor Mosack, driving for Bret Holmes Racing, would finish in 3rd, respectively.

== Background ==
Iowa Speedway is a 7/8-mile (1.4 km) paved oval motor racing track in Newton, Iowa, United States, approximately 30 miles (48 km) east of Des Moines. It has over 25,000 permanent seats as well as a unique multi-tiered RV viewing area along the backstretch.

=== Entry list ===
- (R) denotes rookie driver

#	Driver	Team	Make	Sponsor
01	Stephanie Moyer	Fast Track Racing	Toyota	EvergreenRacewayPark.com
02	Leland Honeyman (R)	Young's Motorsports	Chevrolet	LH Waterfront Construction
2	Nick Sanchez	Rev Racing	Chevrolet	Max Siegel Inc.
03	Alex Clubb	Clubb Racing Inc.	Ford	Clubb Racing Inc.
06	Zachary Tinkle	Wayne Peterson Racing	Chevrolet	Pipe Works
6	Rajah Caruth (R)	Rev Racing	Chevrolet	St. Vincent & The Grenadines Tourism
10	Tanner Allen	Fast Track Racing	Toyota	Stolte Farms, CDLJobs.com
11	Bryce Haugeberg	Fast Track Racing	Chevrolet	Magnum Contracting, Haugeberg Farms
12	D. L. Wilson	Fast Track Racing	Toyota	Aaron Kile Singer-Songwriter
15	Conner Jones	Venturini Motorsports	Toyota	Jones Utilities
17	Taylor Gray	David Gilliland Racing	Ford	Ford Performance
18	Sammy Smith (R)	Kyle Busch Motorsports	Toyota	TMC Transportation
20	Jesse Love (R)	Venturini Motorsports	Toyota	Yahoo!
23	Connor Mosack	Bret Holmes Racing	Chevrolet	Nic Tailor Custom Underwear
25	Toni Breidinger (R)	Venturini Motorsports	Toyota	HairClub
27	Tim Richmond	Richmond Motorsports	Chevrolet	Circle Track Warehouse
30	Amber Balcaen (R)	Rette Jones Racing	Ford	ICON Direct
35	Greg Van Alst	Greg Van Alst Motorsports	Ford	CB Fabricating
43	Daniel Dye (R)	GMS Racing	Chevrolet	GMS Racing
44	Ron Vandermeir Jr.	Vanco Racing	Ford	Mak Rak Engineered Rack Repair
48	Brad Smith	Brad Smith Motorsports	Chevrolet	PSST...Copraya Websites
55	Jonathan Shafer	Venturini Motorsports	Toyota	Champion Power Equipment
81	Brandon Jones	Joe Gibbs Racing	Toyota	Morton Salt, Menards
Official entry list

== Practice ==
The only 45-minute practice session was held on Saturday, June 11, at 4:15 PM CST. Sammy Smith, driving for Kyle Busch Motorsports, would set the fastest time in the session, with a time of 24.307 seconds, and a speed of 129.592 mph (208.558 km/h).

Pos.	#	Driver	Team	Make	Time	Speed
1	18	Sammy Smith (R)	Kyle Busch Motorsports	Toyota	24.307	129.592
2	20	Jesse Love (R)	Venturini Motorsports	Toyota	24.486	128.645
3	43	Daniel Dye (R)	GMS Racing	Chevrolet	24.620	127.945
Full practice results

== Qualifying ==
Qualifying was held on Saturday, June 11, at 6:00 PM CST. The qualifying system used is a multi car, one round system. Whoever sets the fastest time in the round wins the pole.

Jesse Love, driving for Venturini Motorsports, scored the pole for the race, with a time of 24.437 seconds, and a speed of 128.903 mph (207.449 km/h).

=== Full qualifying results ===
Pos.	#	Driver	Team	Make	Time	Speed
1	20	Jesse Love (R)	Venturini Motorsports	Toyota	24.437	128.903
2	43	Daniel Dye (R)	GMS Racing	Chevrolet	24.463	128.766
3	15	Conner Jones	Venturini Motorsports	Toyota	24.528	128.425
4	17	Taylor Gray	David Gilliland Racing	Ford	24.573	128.189
5	81	Brandon Jones	Joe Gibbs Racing	Toyota	24.592	128.090
6	23	Connor Mosack	Bret Holmes Racing	Chevrolet	24.606	128.018
7	55	Jonathan Shafer	Venturini Motorsports	Toyota	24.689	127.587
8	2	Nick Sanchez	Rev Racing	Chevrolet	24.728	127.386
9	18	Sammy Smith (R)	Kyle Busch Motorsports	Toyota	24.798	127.026
10	35	Greg Van Alst	Greg Van Alst Motorsports	Ford	24.947	126.268
11	6	Rajah Caruth (R)	Rev Racing	Chevrolet	25.027	125.864
12	02	Leland Honeyman (R)	Young's Motorsports	Chevrolet	25.154	125.229
13	44	Ron Vandermeir Jr.	Vanco Racing	Ford	25.157	125.214
14	30	Amber Balcaen (R)	Rette Jones Racing	Ford	25.211	124.945
15	25	Toni Breidinger (R)	Venturini Motorsports	Toyota	25.313	124.442
16	12	D. L. Wilson	Fast Track Racing	Toyota	26.395	119.341
17	01	Stephanie Moyer	Fast Track Racing	Toyota	26.534	118.716
18	11	Bryce Haugeberg	Fast Track Racing	Chevrolet	26.620	118.332
19	10	Tanner Allen	Fast Track Racing	Toyota	26.622	118.323
20	06	Zachary Tinkle	Wayne Peterson Racing	Chevrolet	27.208	115.775
21	03	Alex Clubb	Clubb Racing Inc.	Ford	27.963	112.649
22	48	Brad Smith	Brad Smith Motorsports	Chevrolet	28.297	111.319
23	27	Tim Richmond	Richmond Motorsports	Chevrolet	-	-
Official qualifying results

== Race results ==
Fin.	St	#	Driver	Team	Make	Laps	Led	Status	Pts
1	5	81	Brandon Jones	Joe Gibbs Racing	Toyota	150	31	Running	47
2	9	18	Sammy Smith (R)	Kyle Busch Motorsports	Toyota	150	64	Running	44
3	6	23	Connor Mosack	Bret Holmes Racing	Chevrolet	150	0	Running	41
4	7	55	Jonathan Shafer	Venturini Motorsports	Toyota	150	0	Running	40
5	3	15	Conner Jones	Venturini Motorsports	Toyota	150	0	Running	39
6	12	02	Leland Honeyman (R)	Young's Motorsports	Chevrolet	150	0	Running	38
7	8	2	Nick Sanchez	Rev Racing	Chevrolet	150	0	Running	37
8	10	35	Greg Van Alst	Greg Van Alst Motorsports	Ford	150	0	Running	36
9	13	44	Ron Vandermeir Jr.	Vanco Racing	Ford	150	0	Running	35
10	14	30	Amber Balcaen (R)	Rette Jones Racing	Ford	149	0	Running	34
11	15	25	Toni Breidinger (R)	Venturini Motorsports	Toyota	149	0	Running	33
12	11	6	Rajah Caruth (R)	Rev Racing	Chevrolet	148	0	Running	32
13	1	20	Jesse Love (R)	Venturini Motorsports	Toyota	145	55	Battery	33
14	18	11	Bryce Haugeberg	Fast Track Racing	Chevrolet	141	0	Running	30
15	22	48	Brad Smith	Brad Smith Motorsports	Chevrolet	137	0	Running	29
16	21	03	Alex Clubb	Clubb Racing Inc.	Ford	107	0	Rear End	28
17	2	43	Daniel Dye (R)	GMS Racing	Chevrolet	88	0	Oil Leak	27
18	4	17	Taylor Gray	David Gilliland Racing	Ford	65	0	Engine	26
19	16	12	D. L. Wilson	Fast Track Racing	Toyota	53	0	Battery	25
20	19	10	Tanner Allen	Fast Track Racing	Toyota	52	0	Overheating	24
21	17	01	Stephanie Moyer	Fast Track Racing	Toyota	22	0	Brakes	23
22	20	06	Zachary Tinkle	Wayne Peterson Racing	Chevrolet	16	0	Brakes	22
23	23	27	Tim Richmond	Richmond Motorsports	Chevrolet	2	0	Suspension	21
Official race results

== Standings after the race ==
Drivers' Championship standings

	Pos	Driver	Points
1	1	Nick Sanchez	279
1	2	Rajah Caruth	279
	3	Daniel Dye	267 (-12)
	4	Toni Breidinger	234 (-45)
	5	Amber Balcaen	230 (-49)
	6	Greg Van Alst	225 (-54)
	7	Zachary Tinkle	191 (-88)
1	8	Brad Smith	183 (-96)
1	9	Corey Heim	165 (-114)
5	10	Connor Mosack	155 (-124)

- Note: Only the first 10 positions are included for the driver standings.

Previous race: 2022 General Tire 150 (Charlotte)	ARCA Menards Series; 2022 season	Next race: 2022 Zinsser SmartCoat 200

Previous race: 2022 Music City 200	ARCA Menards Series East; 2022 season	Next race: 2022 Sprecher 150
