= Bryce Haugeberg =

American racing driver (born 2003)

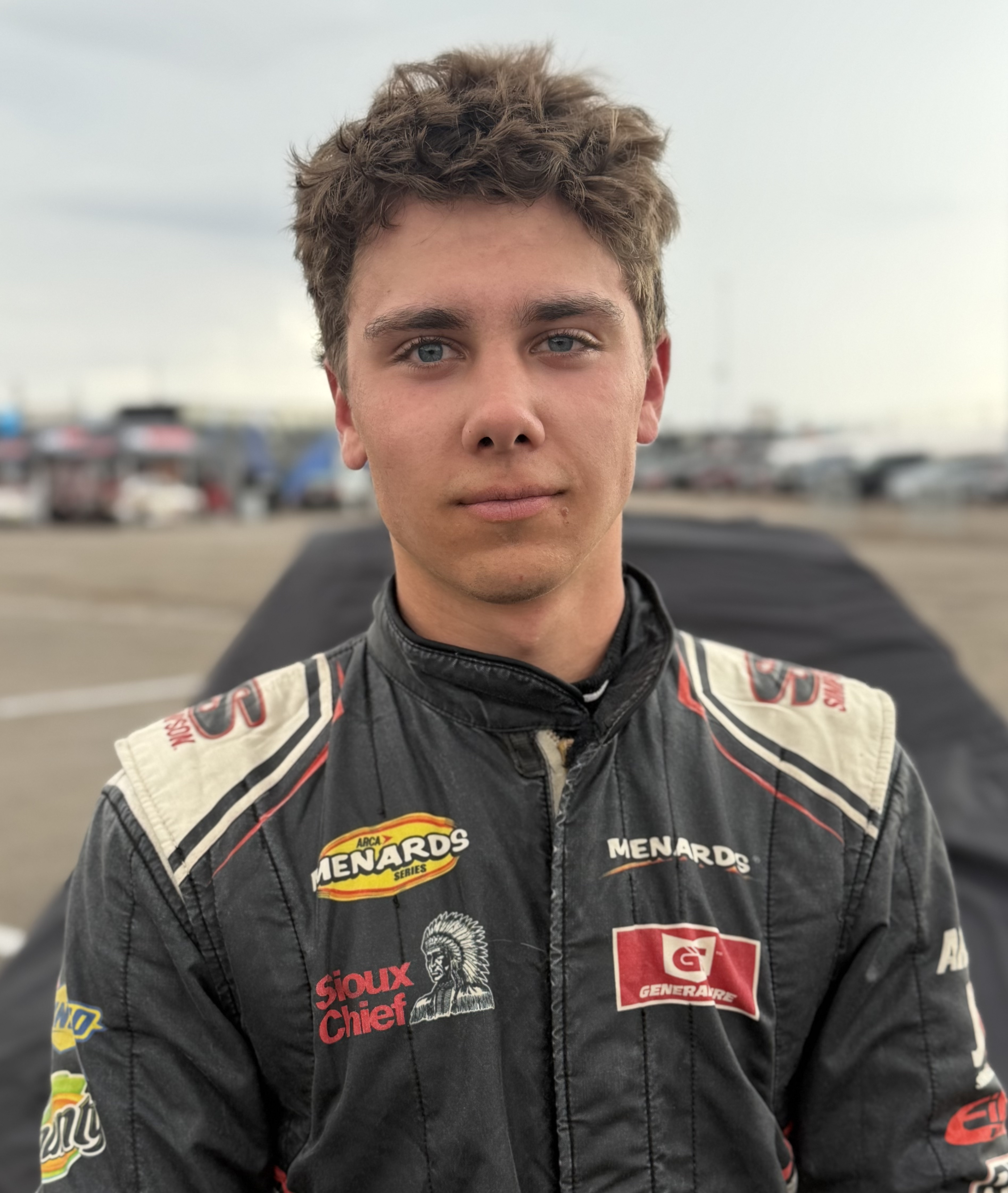
- Haugeberg in 2025
- Born: August 5, 2003 (age 23); West Fargo, North Dakota, U.S.

ARCA Menards Series career
- 27 races run over 6 years
- Best finish: 17th (2022)
- First race: 2021 General Tire 150 (Phoenix)
- Last race: 2026 Shore Lunch 250 (Elko)
Wins	Top tens	Poles
0	4	0

ARCA Menards Series East career
- 3 races run over 2 years
- Best finish: 34th (2022)
- First race: 2021 Shore Lunch 150 (Iowa)
- Last race: 2022 Sprecher 150 (Milwaukee)
Wins	Top tens	Poles
0	0	0

ARCA Menards Series West career
- 4 races run over 4 years
- Best finish: 62nd (2021)
- First race: 2021 General Tire 150 (Phoenix)
- Last race: 2025 Star Nursery 150 (Las Vegas Bullring)
Wins	Top tens	Poles
0	0	0
- Statistics up to date as of June 27, 2026.

Bryce Haugeberg (born August 5, 2003) is an American professional stock car racing driver. He last competed part-time in the ARCA Menards Series, driving the No. 11 for Fast Track Racing.

== Racing career ==
=== ARCA Menards Series ===
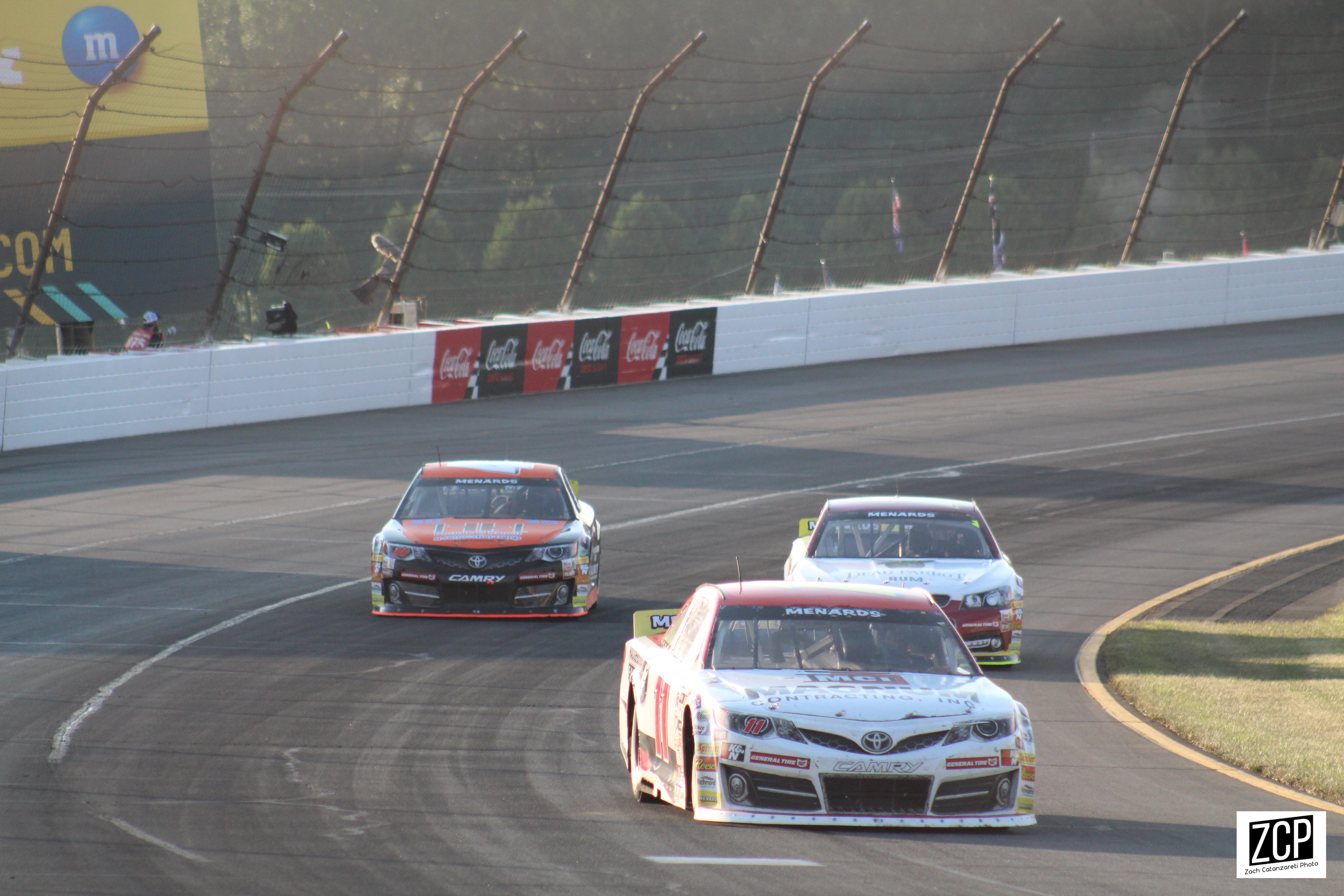
Haugeberg (No. 11) racing Ed Pompa (No. 44) and Jon Garrett (No. 10) in the ARCA race at Pocono in 2022

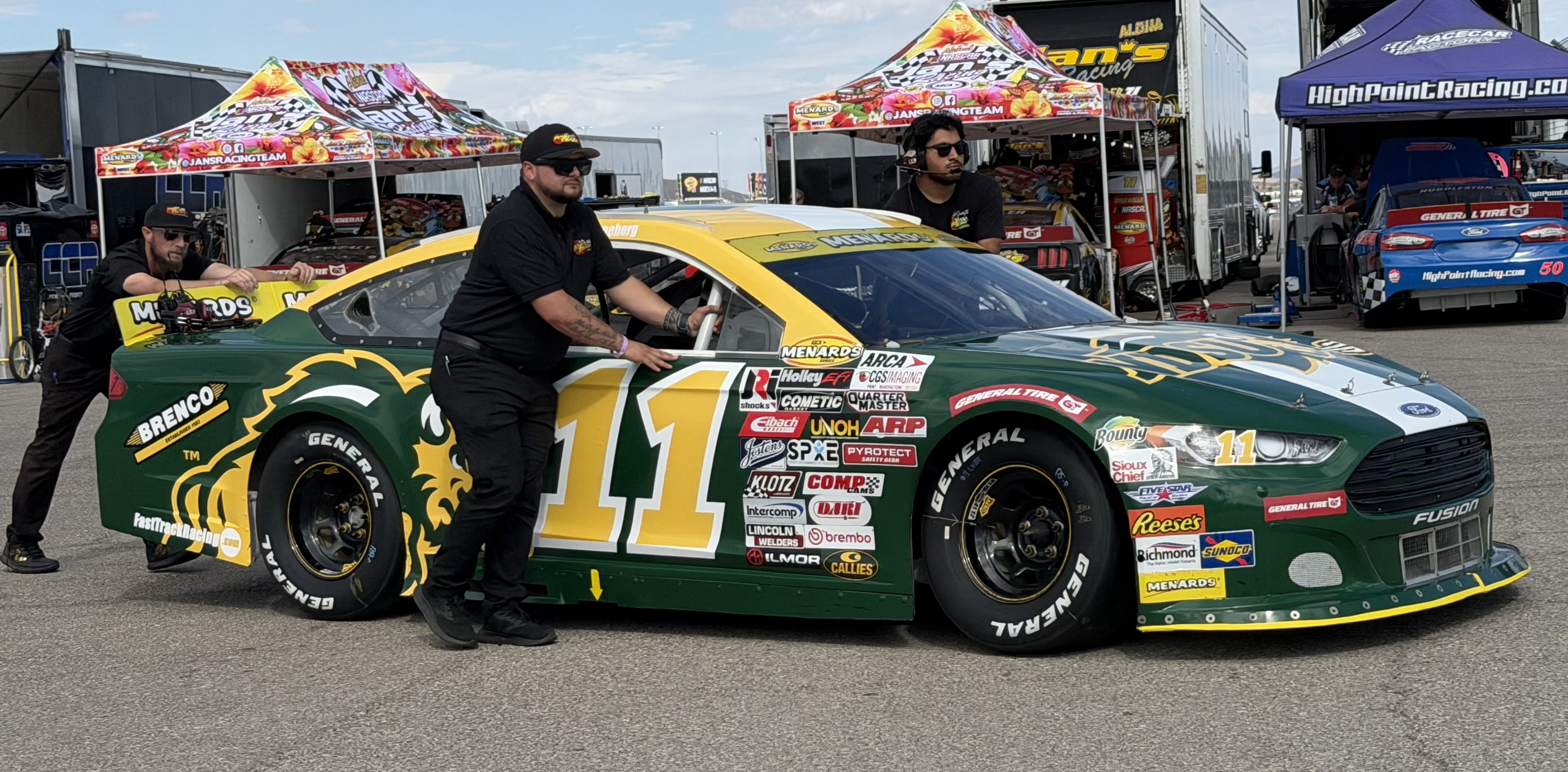
Haugeberg's No. 11 ARCA car at the Las Vegas Motor Speedway Bullring in 2025

Haugeberg would first make his debut in the ARCA Menards Series, driving the No. 01 for Fast Track Racing. He would retire after being spun by Drew Dollar, retiring in 25th. He would make two more starts, finishing with a best of thirteenth at the 2021 Zinsser SmartCoat 200.

In 2022, Haugeberg would drive for the No. 94 for his own team Haugeberg Racing in the superspeedway events. Haugeberg's No. 94 would also have a technical partnership with Cram Racing Enterprises. Haugeberg would also drive for Fast Track Racing in numerous races in a partnership with his own team. In the Atlas 100, Haugeberg was involved in a violent crash with Buddy Kofoid, where Kofoid ran into a slowing Haugeberg, causing the latter's car to roll over several times before coming to rest on its side. Both drivers were able to walk away from the crash without serious injury.

In 2025, Haugeberg would drive the No. 06 for Wayne Peterson Racing at Daytona, plus a technical alliance with Fast Track Racing.

=== Dirt track racing ===
Haugeberg races in the POWRi Minn-Kota Lightning Sprints series, driving the No. 22.

== Personal life ==
Haugeberg is currently a Junior Engineering student at North Dakota State University.

Haugeberg has a brother, Jake, who also is a racing driver.

== Motorsports career results ==
=== ARCA Menards Series ===
(key) (Bold – Pole position awarded by qualifying time. Italics – Pole position earned by points standings or practice time. * – Most laps led.)

ARCA Menards Series results
Year	Team	No.	Make	1	2	3	4	5	6	7	8	9	10	11	12	13	14	15	16	17	18	19	20	AMSC	Pts	Ref
2021	Fast Track Racing	01	Chevy	DAY	PHO; 25	TAL	KAN	TOL	CLT	MOH	POC													48th	77	
2021	Fast Track Racing	11	Chevy									ELK; 13	BLN	IOW; 17	WIN	GLN	MCH	ISF	MLW	DSF	BRI	SLM	KAN	48th	77	
2022	Haugeberg Racing	94	Toyota	DAY; 33		TAL; 18																		17th	296	
2022	Fast Track Racing	11	Chevy		PHO; 28				IOW; 14	BLN	ELK; 14	MOH	POC; 16	IRP; 13	MCH	GLN								17th	296	
2022	Fast Track Racing	11	Toyota				KAN; 13	CLT										MLW; 19	DSF	KAN	BRI			17th	296	
2022	Fast Track Racing	12	Toyota														ISF; 10							17th	296	
2022	Fast Track Racing	10	Toyota																			SLM; 10	TOL	17th	296	
2023	Fast Track Racing	11	Toyota	DAY; 16		TAL; 15	KAN	CLT	BLN															37th	100	
2023	Fast Track Racing	11	Ford		PHO; 32					ELK; 13	MOH	IOW	POC	MCH	IRP	GLN	ISF	MLW	DSF	KAN	BRI	SLM	TOL	37th	100	
2024	Fast Track Racing	11	Toyota	DAY; 26	PHO	TAL; 18	DOV	KAN	CLT	IOW	MOH	BLN	IRP	SLM										44th	102	
2024	Fast Track Racing	10	Ford												ELK; 13	MCH	ISF; 17	MLW	DSF	GLN	BRI	KAN	TOL	44th	102	
2025	Fast Track Racing	06	Toyota	DAY; 10	PHO																			45th	100	
2025	Fast Track Racing	11	Toyota			TAL; 8	KAN	CLT	MCH	BLN														45th	100	
2025	Fast Track Racing	11	Ford								ELK; 15	LRP	DOV	IRP	IOW	GLN	ISF	MAD	DSF	BRI	SLM	KAN	TOL	45th	100	
2026	Fast Track Racing	11	Toyota	DAY; 18	PHO	KAN	TAL; 27	GLN	TOL	MCH	POC	BER												58th	75	
2026	Fast Track Racing	11	Ford										ELK; 12	CHI	LRP	IRP	IOW	ISF	MAD	DSF	SLM	BRI	KAN	58th	75	

==== ARCA Menards Series East ====
ARCA Menards Series East results
Year	Team	No.	Make	1	2	3	4	5	6	7	8	AMSEC	Pts	Ref
2021	Fast Track Racing	11	Chevy	NSM	FIF	NSV	DOV	SNM	IOW; 17	MLW	BRI	48th	27	
2022	Fast Track Racing	11	Chevy	NSM	FIF	DOV	NSV	IOW; 14				34th	55	
2022	Fast Track Racing	11	Toyota						MLW; 19	BRI		34th	55	

==== ARCA Menards Series West ====
ARCA Menards Series West results
Year	Team	No.	Make	1	2	3	4	5	6	7	8	9	10	11	12	AMSWC	Pts	Ref
2021	Fast Track Racing	01	Chevy	PHO; 25	SON	IRW	CNS	IRW	PIR	LVS	AAS	PHO				62nd	19	
2022	Fast Track Racing	11	Chevy	PHO; 28	IRW	KCR	PIR	SON	IRW	EVG	PIR	AAS	LVS	PHO		65th	16	
2023	Fast Track Racing	11	Ford	PHO; 32	IRW	KCR	PIR	SON	IRW	SHA	EVG	AAS	LVS	MAD	PHO	75th	12	
2025	Fast Track Racing	11	Ford	KER	PHO	TUC	CNS	KER	SON	TRI	PIR	AAS	MAD	LVS; 19	PHO	70th	25	
