= Golden Eagle Syrup =

American brand of syrup

- Product type: Syrup
- Current owner: Golden Eagle Syrup Manufacturing Company
- Country: Fayette, Alabama
- Introduced: 1928
- Markets: Southeastern United States
- Website: www.goldeneaglesyrup.com

Golden Eagle is an American brand of syrup manufactured by the Golden Eagle Syrup Manufacturing Company in Fayette, Alabama.

== History ==
Golden Eagle Syrup was founded in 1928 by Victor and Lucy Patterson of Fayette, Alabama. Victor decided to create a mild table syrup after most available syrups irritated his stomach. Due to the lack of maple syrup, Patterson created Golden Eagle syrup from a combination of cane sugar, corn syrup, molasses, and honey. The brand was named after the Golden eagle in reference to the color of the syrup and the fact that an eagle soars high above the ground. The Pattersons originally produced the syrup in their backyard, but by 1944 demand had increased to the degree that a former grocery warehouse was purchased in downtown Fayette to serve as a new manufacturing building. The company remained in the Patterson family until 1986, when it passed through multiple owners before being purchased by Temple Bowling and John Blevins in 2011. The syrup is still manufactured in the same building that was originally purchased in 1944. The syrup is produced on Tuesdays and Thursdays and around 500 gallons are made each production day.

A copyright for the label was granted by the United States Copyright Office on November 15, 1939.

In June 2019, the company introduced a Golden Eagle Caramel Corn.

== Uses ==
In addition to its use as a condiment, Golden Eagle syrup is also commonly used in making pecan pie.

== Sponsorships ==
In 2020, Golden Eagle began sponsoring stock car racing driver Bret Holmes, who races in the ARCA Menards Series. The Golden Eagle Brand sponsored the Second place team in The 2022 Dixie Softball World Series in August

== See also ==
- List of syrups
