= Sean Corr =

American racing driver (born 1984)

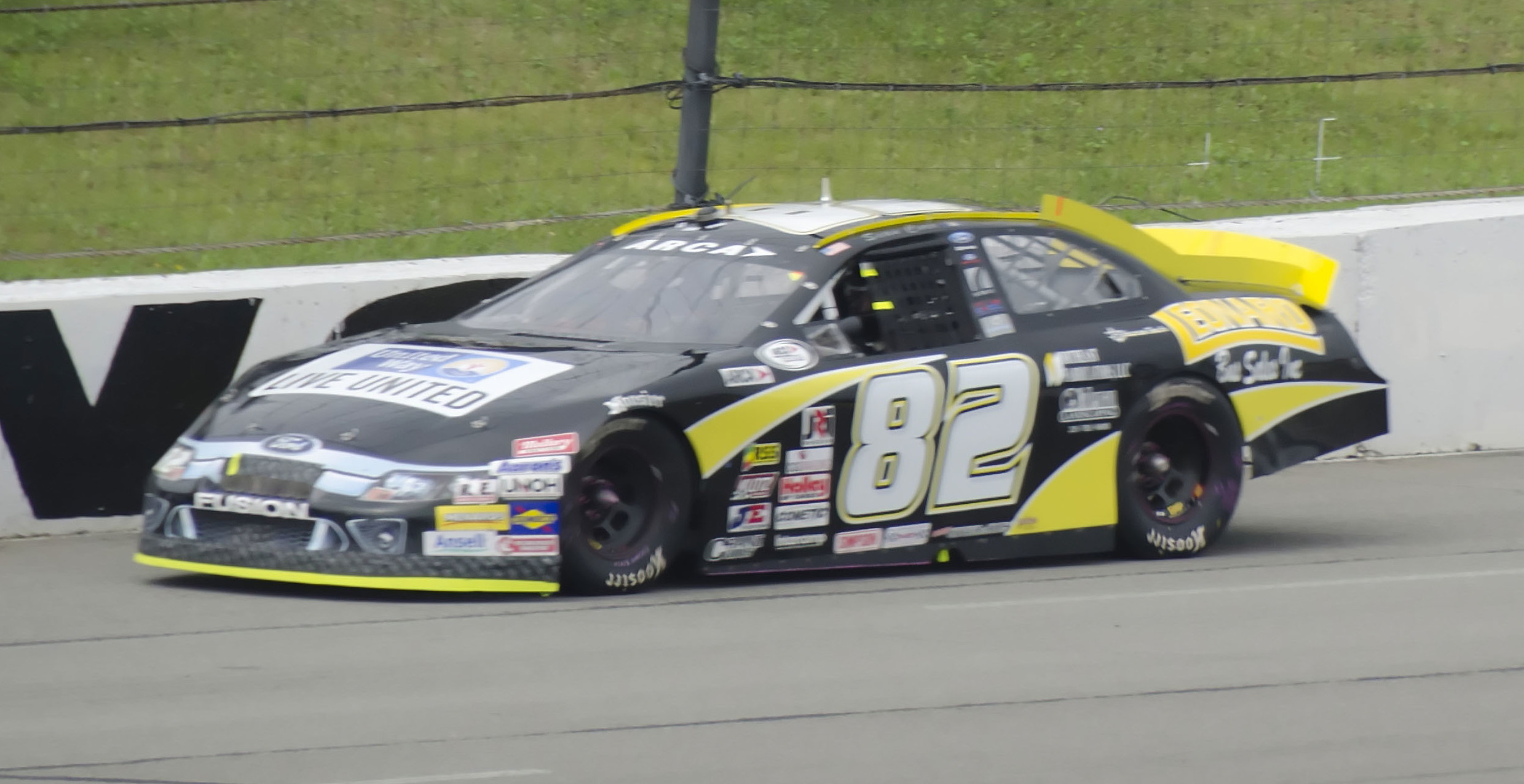
- Corr's No. 82 ARCA car at Pocono Raceway in 2011
- Born: February 21, 1984 (age 42); Goshen, New York, U.S.

NASCAR FedEx Freight Truck Series career
- 6 races run over 5 years
- 2016 position: 108th
- Best finish: 58th (2013)
- First race: 2012 Pocono Mountains 125 (Pocono)
- Last race: 2016 Pocono Mountains 150 (Pocono)
Wins	Top tens	Poles
0	0	0

ARCA Menards Series career
- 77 races run over 19 years
- Best finish: 9th (2011)
- First race: 2009 Drive Smart Buckle-Up 150 (Kentucky)
- Last race: 2026 Audubon Park 100 (DuQuoin)
Wins	Top tens	Poles
0	19	1

ARCA Menards Series East career
- 1 race run over 1 year
- Best finish: 55th (2009)
- First race: 2009 Pepsi Full Fender Frenzy 100 (Thompson)
Wins	Top tens	Poles
0	0	0
- Statistics up to date as of September 6, 2026.

Sean Corr (born February 21, 1984) is an American professional stock car racing driver and owner. He last competed part-time in the ARCA Menards Series, driving the No. 8 Chevrolet SS for Empire Racing. Corr is also the president of Educational Bus Transportation, a school bus provider on Long Island.

== Racing career ==
=== Camping World Truck Series ===
Corr has made six starts in the Camping World Truck Series. He drove his family-owned truck entry at Daytona, Talladega, Eldora and Pocono. His best finish was 20th in the Aspen Dental Eldora Dirt Derby in 2015. In 2016, Corr attempted again to race at Eldora but a spin in the LCQ ended his hopes to make the field. In the following week at Pocono, Corr drove the No. 6 Chevrolet Silverado for Norm Benning Racing and finished 30th.

=== ARCA Menards Series ===
Corr usually attempts Daytona, Talladega, and Pocono events every year. In 2011, he completed in all races (full-season) and finished ninth in the championship. His best finish was fourth at Daytona in 2020 after leading seven laps behind the wheel of his family-owned No. 8 Chevrolet. He also has a pole position in the series, at Daytona in 2012.

=== Camping World East Series ===
Corr's only start in the NASCAR Camping World East Series was in 2009 at Thompson, where he started in 22nd and finished in sixteenth.

== Motorsports career results ==
=== Stock car career summary ===
Season	Series	Team	Races	Wins	Top 5	Top 10	Points	Position
2008	ARCA Re/Max Series	Randy Baker Racing	0	0	0	0	0	N/A
2009	NASCAR Camping World East Series	Empire Racing	1	0	0	0	115	55th
2009	ARCA Re/Max Series	Empire Racing	4	0	0	0	590	51st
2010	ARCA Racing Series	Empire Racing	6	0	0	0	810	33rd
2011	ARCA Racing Series	Empire Racing	19	0	0	2	3985	9th
2012	ARCA Racing Series	Empire Racing	5	0	0	1	640	34th
2012	NASCAR Camping World Truck Series	Empire Racing	1	0	0	0	20	68th
2013	ARCA Racing Series	Empire Racing	3	0	1	1	540	49th
2013	NASCAR Camping World Truck Series	Empire Racing	2	0	0	0	29	58th
2014	ARCA Racing Series	Empire Racing	1	0	0	1	180	87th
2014	NASCAR Camping World Truck Series	Empire Racing	1	0	0	0	13	83rd
2015	ARCA Racing Series	Empire Racing	1	0	0	0	85	132nd
2015	NASCAR Camping World Truck Series	Empire Racing	1	0	0	0	24	67th
2016	ARCA Racing Series	Empire Racing	3	0	1	1	435	53rd
2016	NASCAR Camping World Truck Series	Empire Racing	0	0	0	0	0	NC†
2016	NASCAR Camping World Truck Series	Norm Benning Racing	1	0	0	0	0	NC†
2017	ARCA Racing Series	Empire Racing	3	0	0	0	475	42nd
2018	ARCA Racing Series	Empire Racing	3	0	0	0	420	48th
2019	ARCA Menards Series	Empire Racing	2	0	1	1	470	47th
2020	ARCA Menards Series	Empire Racing	3	0	1	2	108	31st
2021	ARCA Menards Series	Empire Racing	2	0	0	2	69	55th
2022	ARCA Menards Series	Empire Racing	4	0	1	2	110	33rd
2023	ARCA Menards Series	Empire Racing	7	0	2	2	214	22nd
2024	ARCA Menards Series	Empire Racing	4	0	0	1	113	38th
2025	ARCA Menards Series	Empire Racing	2	0	1	1	47	83rd
2026	ARCA Menards Series	Empire Racing	5	0	0	1	133	36th

^{†} As Corr was a guest driver, he was ineligible for championship points.

=== NASCAR ===
(key) (Bold – Pole position awarded by qualifying time. Italics – Pole position earned by points standings or practice time. * – Most laps led.)

==== Camping World Truck Series ====
NASCAR Camping World Truck Series results
Year	Team	No.	Make	1	2	3	4	5	6	7	8	9	10	11	12	13	14	15	16	17	18	19	20	21	22	23	NCWTC	Pts	Ref
2012	Empire Racing	82	Ford	DAY	MAR	CAR	KAN	CLT	DOV	TEX	KEN	IOW	CHI	POC; 25	MCH	BRI	ATL	IOW	KEN	LVS	TAL	MAR	TEX	PHO	HOM; DNQ		68th	20	
2013	Empire Racing	82	Ford	DAY; DNQ	MAR	CAR	KAN	CLT	DOV	TEX	KEN	IOW	ELD	POC; 26	MCH	BRI	MSP	IOW	CHI	LVS	TAL; 33	MAR	TEX	PHO	HOM		58th	29	
2014	Empire Racing	82	Ford	DAY; 31	MAR	KAN	CLT	DOV	TEX	GTW	KEN	IOW	ELD	POC	MCH	BRI	MSP	CHI	NHA	LVS	TAL	MAR	TEX	PHO	HOM		83rd	13	
2015	Empire Racing	82	Ford	DAY	ATL	MAR	KAN	CLT	DOV	TEX	GTW	IOW	KEN	ELD; 20	POC	MCH	BRI	MSP	CHI	NHA	LVS	TAL	MAR	TEX	PHO	HOM	67th	24	
2016	Empire Racing	82	Chevy	DAY	ATL	MAR	KAN	DOV	CLT	TEX	IOW	GTW	KEN	ELD; DNQ													108th	0^{1}	
2016	Norm Benning Racing	6	Chevy												POC; 30	BRI	MCH	MSP	CHI	NHA	LVS	TAL	MAR	TEX	PHO	HOM	108th	0^{1}	

==== Camping World East Series ====
NASCAR Camping World East Series results
Year	Team	No.	Make	1	2	3	4	5	6	7	8	9	10	11	NCWESC	Pts	Ref
2009	Empire Racing	82	Chevy	GRE	TRI	IOW	SBO	GLN	NHA	TMP; 16	ADI	LRP	NHA	DOV	55th	115	

^{*} Season still in progress
^{1} Ineligible for series points

=== ARCA Menards Series ===
(key) (Bold – Pole position awarded by qualifying time. Italics – Pole position earned by points standings or practice time. * – Most laps led.)

ARCA Menards Series results
Year	Team	No.	Make	1	2	3	4	5	6	7	8	9	10	11	12	13	14	15	16	17	18	19	20	21	AMSC	Pts	Ref
2008	Randy Baker Racing	86	Dodge	DAY	SLM	IOW	KAN	CAR	KEN	TOL	POC	MCH	CAY	KEN	BLN	POC; DNQ	NSH	ISF	DSF	CHI	SLM	NJE	TAL	TOL	N/A	–	
2009	Empire Racing	82	Ford	DAY	SLM	CAR	TAL	KEN; 26	TOL	POC; 13	MCH	MFD	IOW	KEN	BLN	POC; 14	ISF	CHI; 13	TOL	DSF	NJE	SLM	KAN	CAR	51st	590	
2010	Empire Racing	83	Ford	DAY; 14	PBE	SLM																			33rd	810	
2010	Empire Racing	82	Ford				TEX; 28	TAL; 26	TOL	POC; 12	MCH; 18	IOW	MFD	POC; 16	BLN	NJE	ISF	CHI	DSF	TOL	SLM	KAN	CAR		33rd	810	
2011	Empire Racing	82	Ford	DAY; 15	TAL; 16	SLM; 14	TOL; 20	NJE; 16	CHI; 13	POC; 11	MCH; 24	WIN; 13	BLN; 12	IOW; 9	IRP; 27	POC; 11	ISF; 11	MAD; 7	DSF; 11	SLM; 11	KAN; 14	TOL; 22			9th	3985	
2012	Empire Racing	82	Ford	**DAY**; 43	MOB; 14	SLM; 30	TAL; 10	TOL	ELK	POC; 12	MCH	WIN	NJE	IOW	CHI	IRP	POC	BLN	ISF	MAD	SLM	DSF; C	KAN		34th	640	
2013	Empire Racing	82	Ford	DAY; 5	MOB	SLM	TAL; 14	TOL	ELK	POC; 11	MCH	ROA	WIN	CHI	NJE	POC	BLN	ISF	MAD	DSF	IOW	SLM	KEN	KAN	49th	540	
2014	Empire Racing	48	Ford	DAY; 10	MOB	SLM	TAL	TOL	NJE	POC	MCH	ELK	WIN	CHI	IRP	POC	BLN	ISF	MAD	DSF	SLM	KEN	KAN		87th	180	
2015	Empire Racing	48	Ford	DAY; 29	MOB	NSH	SLM	TAL	TOL	NJE	POC	MCH	CHI	WIN	IOW	IRP	POC	BLN	ISF	DSF	SLM	KEN	KAN		132nd	85	
2016	Empire Racing	48	Ford	DAY; 27	NSH	SLM	TAL; 5	TOL	NJE	POC	MCH	MAD	WIN	IOW	IRP	POC; 12	BLN	ISF	DSF	SLM	CHI	KEN	KAN		53rd	435	
2017	Empire Racing	46	Ford	DAY; 11	NSH	SLM	TAL; 15	TOL	ELK	POC	MCH	MAD	IOW	IRP											42nd	475	
2017	Empire Racing	43	Ford												POC; 17	WIN	ISF	ROA	DSF	SLM	CHI	KEN	KAN		42nd	475	
2018	Empire Racing	43	Chevy	DAY; 20	NSH	SLM																			48th	420	
2018	Empire Racing	46	Chevy				TAL; 23	TOL	CLT	POC	MCH	MAD	GTW	CHI	IOW	ELK									48th	420	
2018	Empire Racing	43	Ford														POC; 12	ISF	BLN	DSF	SLM	IRP	KAN		48th	420	
2019	Empire Racing	43	Chevy	DAY; 5	FIF	SLM	TAL; 15*	NSH	TOL	CLT	POC	MCH	MAD	GTW	CHI	ELK	IOW	POC	ISF	DSF	SLM	IRP	KAN		47th	370	
2020	Empire Racing	8	Chevy	DAY; 4	PHO	TAL; 9																			31st	108	
2020	Empire Racing	82	Chevy				POC; 12	IRP	KEN	IOW	KAN	TOL	TOL	MCH	DAY	GTW	L44	TOL	BRI	WIN	MEM	ISF	KAN		31st	108	
2021	Empire Racing	8	Chevy	DAY; 10	PHO	TAL	KAN	TOL	CLT	MOH	POC; 9	ELK	BLN	IOW	WIN	GLN	MCH	ISF	MLW	DSF	BRI	SLM	KAN		55th	69	
2022	Empire Racing	29	Chevy	DAY; 4	PHO																				33rd	110	
2022	Empire Racing	8	Chevy			TAL; 31	KAN	CLT; 10	IOW	BLN	ELK	MOH	POC; 22	IRP	MCH	GLN	ISF	MLW	DSF	KAN	BRI	SLM	TOL		33rd	110	
2022	Max Force Racing	9	Chevy			TAL; RL^{†}																			33rd	110	
2023	Empire Racing	8	Chevy	DAY; 3	PHO	TAL; 5		CLT; 24	BLN	ELK	MOH	IOW	POC; 20	MCH	IRP	GLN									22nd	214	
2023	Empire Racing	8	Ford				KAN; 16										ISF; 13	MLW	DSF; 13	KAN	BRI	SLM	TOL		22nd	214	
2024	Empire Racing	8	Chevy	DAY; 30	PHO	TAL; 6	DOV	KAN	CLT	IOW	MOH	BLN	IRP	SLM	ELK	MCH	ISF; 11	MLW	DSF; 17	GLN	BRI	KAN	TOL		38th	113	
2025	Empire Racing	8	Chevy	DAY; 36	PHO	TAL	KAN	CLT	MCH	BLN	ELK	LRP	DOV	IRP	IOW	GLN	ISF; 5	MAD	DSF	BRI	SLM	KAN	TOL		83rd	47	
2026	Empire Racing	8	Chevy	DAY; 33	PHO	KAN	TAL; 7	GLN	TOL	MCH	POC; 19	BER	ELK	CHI	LRP	IRP	IOW	ISF; 12	MAD	DSF; 16	SLM	BRI	KAN		36th	133	
^{†} – Relieved Thomas Praytor.

^{*} Season still in progress
^{1} Ineligible for series points
