= 2022 Dutch Boy 150 =

Fourth race of the 2022 ARCA Menards Series

Race details
- Race 4 of 20 of the 2022 ARCA Menards Series
- Date: May 14, 2022
- Official name: Third Annual Dutch Boy 150
- Location: Kansas City, Kansas, Kansas Speedway
- Course: Permanent racing facility
- Course length: 1.5 miles (2.4 km)
- Distance: 100 laps, 150 mi (241.402 km)
- Scheduled distance: 100 laps, 150 mi (241.402 km)
- Average speed: 113.924 mph (183.343 km/h)

Pole position
| Driver | Corey Heim | Venturini Motorsports |
- Time: 30.729

Most laps led
| Driver | Corey Heim | Venturini Motorsports |
- Laps: 56

Winner
| No. 2 | Nick Sanchez | Rev Racing |

Television in the United States
- Network: Fox Sports 1
- Announcers: Jamie Little, Austin Cindric, Phil Parsons

Radio in the United States
- Radio: Motor Racing Network

The 2022 Dutch Boy 150 was the fourth stock car race of the 2022 ARCA Menards Series season, and the third iteration of the event. The race was held on Saturday, May 14, 2022, in Kansas City, Kansas at Kansas Speedway, a 1.5 mile (4 km) permanent oval-shaped racetrack. The race was contested over 100 laps. At race's end, Nick Sanchez, driving for Rev Racing, would take the win, after holding off teammate Rajah Caruth in the final 36 laps. This was Sanchez's third career ARCA Menards Series win, and his second of the season. To fill out the podium, Daniel Dye of GMS Racing would finish 3rd, respectively.

== Background ==
Kansas Speedway is a 1.5-mile (2.4 km) tri-oval race track in the Village West area near Kansas City, Kansas, United States. It was built in 2001 and it currently hosts two annual NASCAR race weekends. The IndyCar Series also held races at the venue until 2011. The speedway is owned and operated by NASCAR.

=== Entry list ===
- (R) denotes rookie driver

| # | Driver | Team | Make | Sponsor |
|---|---|---|---|---|
| 01 | Arnout Kok | Fast Track Racing | Toyota | Polar Bear, Brand South Africa |
| 2 | Nick Sanchez | Rev Racing | Chevrolet | Max Siegel Inc., Special Smiles |
| 03 | Alex Clubb | Clubb Racing Inc. | Ford | Clubb Racing Inc. |
| 06 | Zachary Tinkle | Wayne Peterson Racing | Chevrolet | Racing for Rescues |
| 6 | Rajah Caruth (R) | Rev Racing | Chevrolet | Max Siegel Inc., Special Smiles |
| 7 | Matt Wilson** | CCM Racing | Toyota | R. A. Wilson Enterprises |
| 10 | Ryan Huff | Fast Track Racing | Ford | Southeastern Services |
| 11 | Bryce Haugeberg | Fast Track Racing | Toyota | Magnum Contracting |
| 12 | D. L. Wilson | Fast Track Racing | Chevrolet | Dansby's Tokio Store |
| 15 | Gus Dean | Venturini Motorsports | Toyota | Mobil 1 |
| 18 | Drew Dollar | Kyle Busch Motorsports | Toyota | Lynx Capital |
| 20 | Corey Heim | Venturini Motorsports | Toyota | Crescent Tools |
| 23 | Connor Mosack | Bret Holmes Racing | Chevrolet | Nic Tailor Custom Underwear |
| 25 | Toni Breidinger (R) | Venturini Motorsports | Toyota | FP Movement |
| 27 | Ron Vandermeir Jr. | Vanco Racing | Ford | Mac Rak Engineered Rak Repair |
| 30 | Amber Balcaen (R) | Rette Jones Racing | Ford | ICON Direct |
| 35 | Greg Van Alst | Greg Van Alst Motorsports | Ford | CB Fabricating |
| 43 | Daniel Dye (R) | GMS Racing | Chevrolet | GMS Racing |
| 48 | Brad Smith | Brad Smith Motorsports | Chevrolet | PSST...Copraya Websites |
| 69 | Will Kimmel | Kimmel Racing | Toyota | Melton McFadden Insurance Agency |
Official entry list

**Withdrew prior to the event.

== Practice/Qualifying ==
Practice and qualifying was combined into one 45-minute session, with a driver's fastest time counting as their qualifying lap. It was held on Saturday, May 14, at 9:45 AM CST. Corey Heim of Venturini Motorsports scored the pole for the race, with a time of 30.729 seconds and a speed of 175.730 mph (282.810 km/h).

| Pos. | # | Driver | Team | Make | Time | Speed |
|---|---|---|---|---|---|---|
| 1 | 20 | Corey Heim | Venturini Motorsports | Toyota | 30.729 | 175.730 |
| 2 | 18 | Drew Dollar | Kyle Busch Motorsports | Toyota | 30.737 | 175.684 |
| 3 | 2 | Nick Sanchez | Rev Racing | Chevrolet | 30.938 | 174.543 |
| 4 | 23 | Connor Mosack | Bret Holmes Racing | Chevrolet | 31.194 | 173.110 |
| 5 | 15 | Gus Dean | Venturini Motorsports | Toyota | 31.264 | 172.723 |
| 6 | 43 | Daniel Dye (R) | GMS Racing | Chevrolet | 31.293 | 172.563 |
| 7 | 69 | Will Kimmel | Kimmel Racing | Toyota | 31.707 | 170.309 |
| 8 | 6 | Rajah Caruth (R) | Rev Racing | Chevrolet | 31.874 | 169.417 |
| 9 | 27 | Ron Vandermeir Jr. | Vanco Racing | Ford | 32.338 | 166.986 |
| 10 | 35 | Greg Van Alst | Greg Van Alst Motorsports | Ford | 32.466 | 166.328 |
| 11 | 10 | Ryan Huff | Fast Track Racing | Ford | 32.570 | 165.797 |
| 12 | 06 | Zachary Tinkle | Wayne Peterson Racing | Chevrolet | 32.590 | 165.695 |
| 13 | 30 | Amber Balcaen (R) | Rette Jones Racing | Ford | 33.127 | 163.009 |
| 14 | 25 | Toni Breidinger (R) | Venturini Motorsports | Toyota | 33.321 | 162.060 |
| 15 | 12 | D. L. Wilson | Fast Track Racing | Chevrolet | 34.010 | 158.777 |
| 16 | 11 | Bryce Haugeberg | Fast Track Racing | Toyota | 34.110 | 158.311 |
| 17 | 01 | Arnout Kok | Fast Track Racing | Toyota | 35.503 | 152.100 |
| 18 | 03 | Alex Clubb | Clubb Racing Inc. | Ford | 35.863 | 150.573 |
| 19 | 48 | Brad Smith | Brad Smith Motorsports | Chevrolet | 36.843 | 146.568 |
Official practice/qualifying results

== Race results ==
| Fin. | St. | # | Driver | Team | Make | Laps | Led | Status | Pts |
|---|---|---|---|---|---|---|---|---|---|
| 1 | 3 | 2 | Nick Sanchez | Rev Racing | Chevrolet | 100 | 42 | Running | 47 |
| 2 | 8 | 6 | Rajah Caruth (R) | Rev Racing | Chevrolet | 100 | 1 | Running | 43 |
| 3 | 6 | 43 | Daniel Dye (R) | GMS Racing | Chevrolet | 100 | 0 | Running | 41 |
| 4 | 5 | 15 | Gus Dean | Venturini Motorsports | Toyota | 100 | 0 | Running | 40 |
| 5 | 4 | 23 | Connor Mosack | Bret Holmes Racing | Chevrolet | 100 | 0 | Running | 39 |
| 6 | 7 | 69 | Will Kimmel | Kimmel Racing | Toyota | 99 | 0 | Running | 38 |
| 7 | 10 | 35 | Greg Van Alst | Greg Van Alst Motorsports | Ford | 99 | 0 | Running | 37 |
| 8 | 9 | 27 | Ron Vandermeir Jr. | Vanco Racing | Ford | 98 | 0 | Running | 36 |
| 9 | 13 | 30 | Amber Balcaen (R) | Rette Jones Racing | Ford | 97 | 0 | Running | 35 |
| 10 | 14 | 25 | Toni Breidinger (R) | Venturini Motorsports | Toyota | 97 | 0 | Running | 34 |
| 11 | 12 | 06 | Zachary Tinkle | Wayne Peterson Racing | Chevrolet | 96 | 0 | Running | 33 |
| 12 | 15 | 12 | D. L. Wilson | Fast Track Racing | Chevrolet | 95 | 0 | Running | 32 |
| 13 | 16 | 11 | Bryce Haugeberg | Fast Track Racing | Toyota | 95 | 0 | Running | 31 |
| 14 | 11 | 10 | Ryan Huff | Fast Track Racing | Ford | 74 | 0 | Electrical | 30 |
| 15 | 2 | 18 | Drew Dollar | Kyle Busch Motorsports | Toyota | 67 | 1 | Accident | 30 |
| 16 | 1 | 20 | Corey Heim | Venturini Motorsports | Toyota | 59 | 56 | Accident | 31 |
| 17 | 18 | 03 | Alex Clubb | Clubb Racing Inc. | Ford | 50 | 0 | Transmission | 27 |
| 18 | 19 | 48 | Brad Smith | Brad Smith Motorsports | Chevrolet | 31 | 0 | Engine | 26 |
| 19 | 17 | 01 | Arnout Kok | Fast Track Racing | Toyota | 0 | 0 | Did Not Start | 25 |
Official race results

== Standings after the race ==
Drivers' Championship standings

| | Pos | Driver | Points |
|---|---|---|---|
| 1 | 1 | Nick Sanchez | 155 |
| 1 | 2 | Rajah Caruth | 155 |
| 1 | 3 | Daniel Dye | 152 (-3) |
| 1 | 4 | Corey Heim | 122 (-33) |
| 1 | 5 | Toni Breidinger | 118 (-37) |
| 1 | 6 | Gus Dean | 118 (-37) |
| 1 | 7 | Amber Balcaen | 109 (-46) |
| 4 | 8 | Parker Chase | 101 (-54) |
| 2 | 9 | D. L. Wilson | 101 (-54) |
| 1 | 10 | Ryan Huff | 100 (-55) |

- Note: Only the first 10 positions are included for the driver standings.

| Previous race: 2022 General Tire 200 (Talladega) | ARCA Menards Series; 2022 season | Next race: 2022 General Tire 150 (Charlotte) |
