= Scott Melton =

American racing driver (born 1961)

- Born: Scott Melton; November 30, 1961 (age 64); Rockford, Michigan, U.S.

ARCA Menards Series career
- 43 races run over 8 years
- Best finish: 15th (2019)
- First race: 2018 Primera Plastics 200 (Berlin)
- Last race: 2025 General Tire 200 (Talladega)
Wins	Top tens	Poles
0	8	0

ARCA Menards Series East career
- 1 race run over 1 year
- Best finish: 42nd (2023)
- First race: 2023 Calypso Lemonade 150 (Iowa)
Wins	Top tens	Poles
0	0	0
- Statistics up to date as of April 26, 2025.

Scott Melton (born November 30, 1961) is an American professional stock car racing driver. He last competed part-time in the ARCA Menards Series, driving the No. 68 Ford Mustang for Kimmel Racing.

== Racing career ==
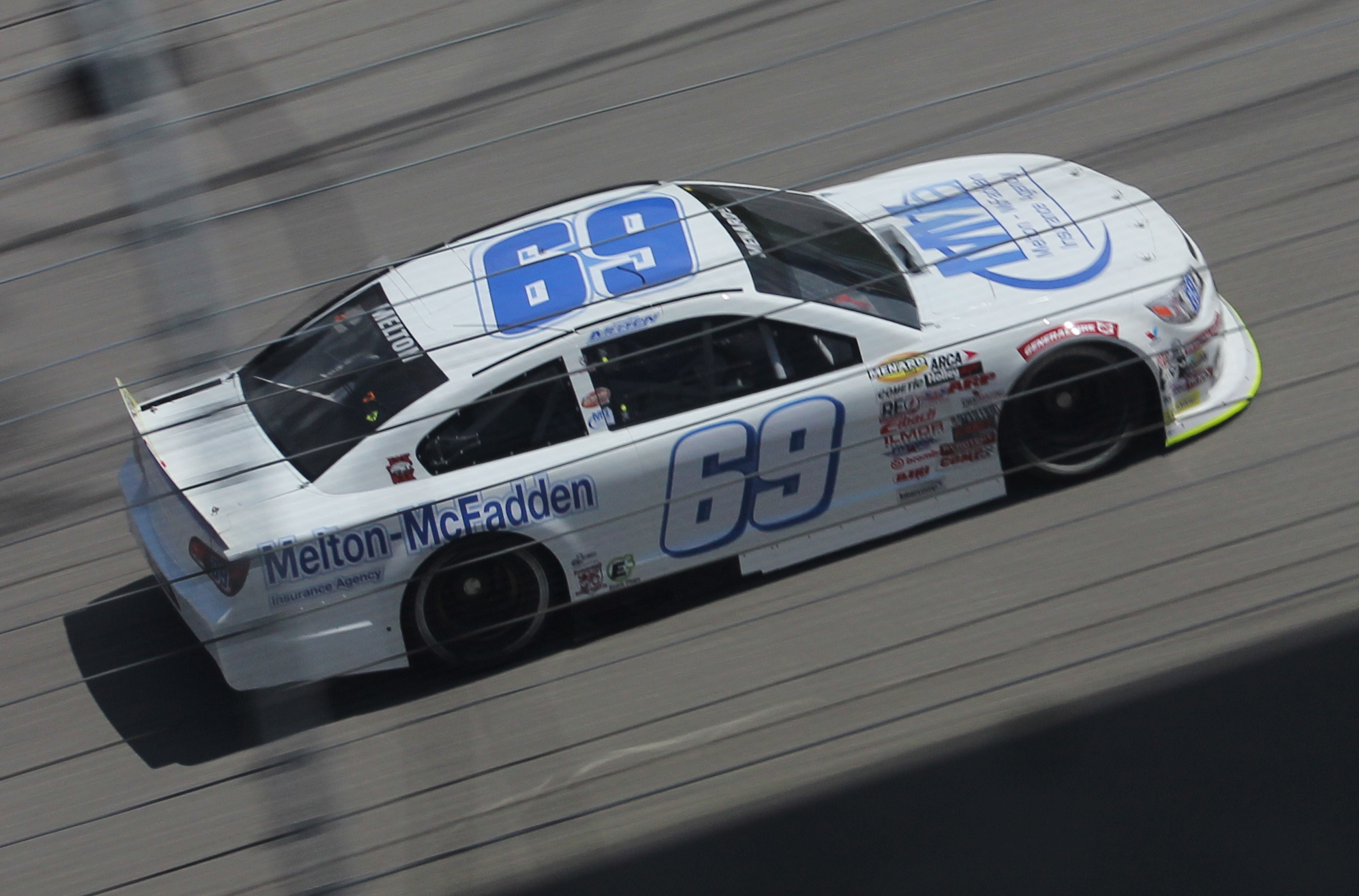
Melton at Michigan Speedway in 2020.

=== ARCA Menards Series ===
Melton would begin racing in 2018, driving 4 Cylinder races at Springport Speedway. He decided to race in the ARCA Menards Series, after having talks with Bill Kimmel, the owner of Kimmel Racing. He finished fifteenth in his first start at Berlin Raceway, and followed with a 25th-place finish at the Lucas Oil Indianapolis Raceway Park. He would run half of the season in 2019, earning two top tens, with his best career finish being ninth at Michigan International Speedway, and finishing 15th in the point standings. 2020 would be his breakout season, earning three top-tens, with his best finish of ninth at Kansas Speedway. He would follow with a tenth place finish at Talladega Superspeedway in 2021. Melton suffered a compound fracture in his left leg in an accident at the 2022 General Tire 200. He would return later that year at Pocono.

== Personal life ==
Melton was born and raised in Rockford, Michigan, and has eight children. He currently operates the Melton-McFadden Insurance Agency, an insurance company located in Greenville and Belding, Michigan, and would often sponsor all of his races.

== Motorsports career results ==
=== ARCA Menards Series ===
(key) (Bold – Pole position awarded by qualifying time. Italics – Pole position earned by points standings or practice time. * – Most laps led.)

ARCA Menards Series results
Year	Team	No.	Make	1	2	3	4	5	6	7	8	9	10	11	12	13	14	15	16	17	18	19	20	ARSC	Pts	Ref
2018	Scott Melton Racing	67	Ford	DAY	NSH	SLM	TAL	TOL	CLT	POC	MCH	MAD	GTW	CHI	IOW	ELK	POC	ISF	BLN; 15	DSF	SLM			81st	180	
2018	Kimmel Racing	68	Ford																			IRP; 25	KAN	81st	180	
2019	Kimmel Racing	69	Ford	DAY; 32	FIF	SLM	TAL; 18	NSH	TOL												SLM; 12	IRP; 14		15th	1645	
2019	Kimmel Racing	69	Toyota							CLT; 14	POC; 13	MCH; 9	MAD	GTW	CHI; 10	ELK	IOW; 15	POC	ISF	DSF			KAN; 14	15th	1645	
2020	Kimmel Racing	69	Ford	DAY; 10	PHO	TAL; 11				IOW; 15	KAN	TOL	TOL											16th	223	
2020	Kimmel Racing	69	Toyota				POC; 10	IRP	KEN; 17															16th	223	
2020	Kimmel Racing	69	Chevy											MCH; 13	DAY	GTW	L44	TOL	BRI	WIN	MEM	ISF	KAN; 9	16th	223	
2021	Kimmel Racing	69	Ford	DAY; 32	PHO	TAL; 10																		22nd	181	
2021	Kimmel Racing	69	Chevy				KAN; 20	TOL																22nd	181	
2021	Kimmel Racing	69	Toyota						CLT; 16	MOH	POC; 23	ELK	BLN	IOW	WIN	GLN	MCH; 14	ISF	MLW	DSF	BRI	SLM	KAN; 12	22nd	181	
2022	Kimmel Racing	69	Ford	DAY; 30	PHO	TAL; 28	KAN	CLT	IOW	BLN	ELK	MOH												27th	125	
2022	Kimmel Racing	69	Toyota										POC; 11	IRP	MCH; 15	GLN	ISF	MLW	DSF	KAN; 11	BRI	SLM	TOL	27th	125	
2023	Kimmel Racing	69	Ford	DAY; 38	PHO	TAL; 8																		21st	220	
2023	Kimmel Racing	69	Toyota				KAN; 14	CLT; 23	BLN	ELK	MOH	IOW; 12	POC; 13	MCH; 18	IRP	GLN	ISF	MLW	DSF	KAN; 7	BRI	SLM	TOL	21st	220	
2024	Kimmel Racing	69	Ford	DAY; 27	PHO	TAL; 14	DOV																	73rd	47	
2024	Kimmel Racing	69	Toyota					KAN; Wth	CLT	IOW	MOH	BLN	IRP	SLM	ELK	MCH	ISF	MLW	DSF	GLN	BRI	KAN	TOL	73rd	47	
2025	Kimmel Racing	68	Ford	DAY; 23	PHO	TAL; 17	KAN	CLT	MCH	BLN	ELK	LRP	DOV	IRP	IOW	GLN	ISF	MAD	DSF	BRI	SLM	KAN	TOL	79th	49	

==== ARCA Menards Series East ====
ARCA Menards Series East results
Year	Team	No.	Make	1	2	3	4	5	6	7	8	AMSEC	Pts	Ref
2023	Kimmel Racing	69	Toyota	FIF	DOV	NSV	FRS	IOW; 12	IRP	MLW	BRI	42nd	32	
