= Zachary Tinkle =

American professional stock car racing driver

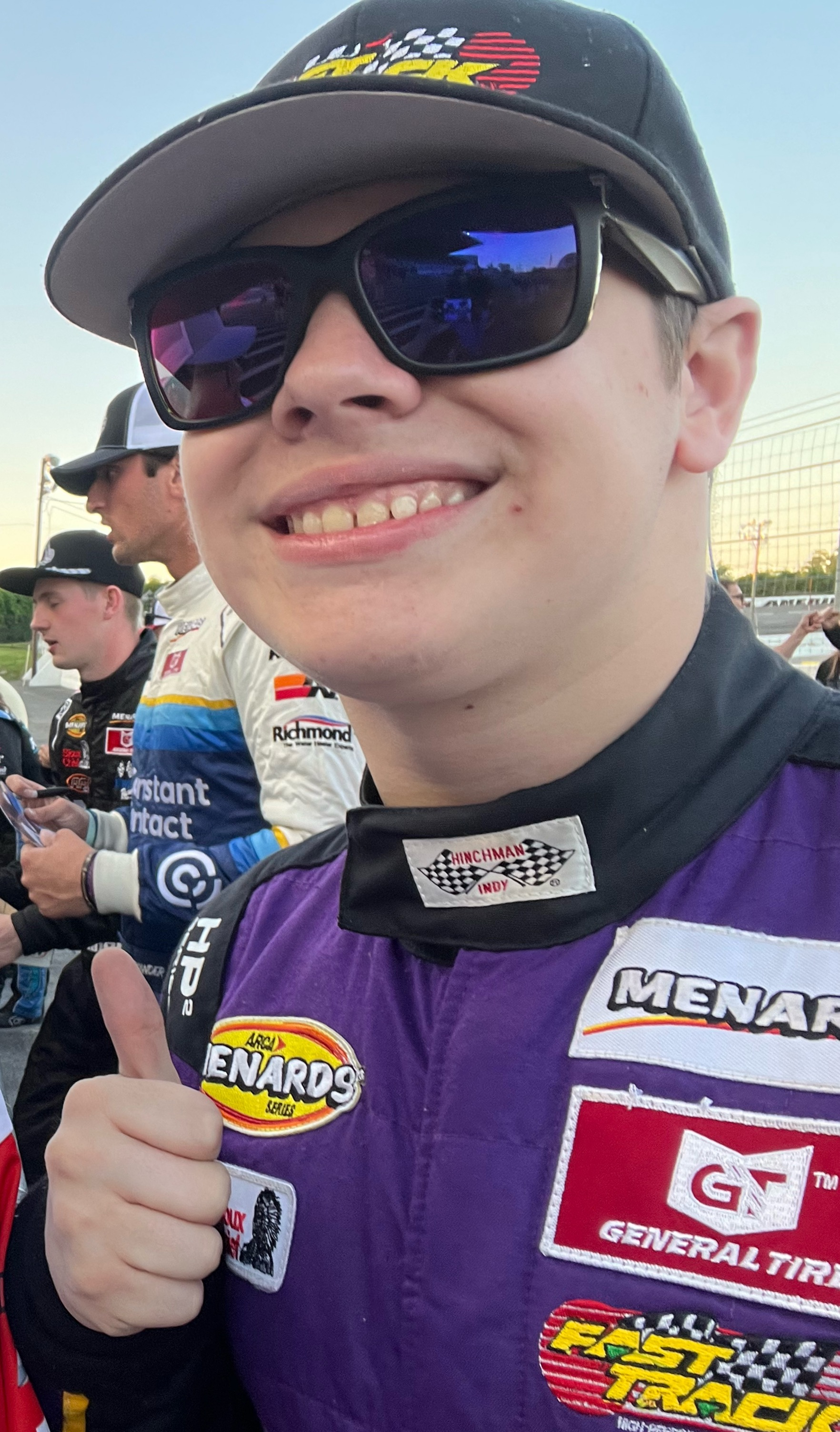
- Tinkle at Fairgrounds Speedway in 2024
- Born: July 3, 2002 (age 24); Speedway, Indiana, U.S.
- Achievements: 2019 CRA Late Model Sportsman Series Champion

ARCA Menards Series career
- 48 races run over 6 years
- Best finish: 9th (2022)
- First race: 2021 Zinsser SmartCoat 200 (Berlin)
- Last race: 2026 Bush's Best 200 (Bristol)
Wins	Top tens	Poles
0	6	0

ARCA Menards Series East career
- 31 races run over 6 years
- Best finish: 3rd (2025)
- First race: 2021 Bush's Beans 200 (Bristol)
- Last race: 2026 Bush's Best 200 (Bristol)
Wins	Top tens	Poles
0	13	0

ARCA Menards Series West career
- 2 races run over 2 years
- Best finish: 66th (2022)
- First race: 2022 General Tire 150 (Phoenix)
- Last race: 2026 General Tire 150 (Phoenix)
Wins	Top tens	Poles
0	0	0
- Statistics up to date as of September 17, 2026.

Zachary Tinkle (born July 3, 2002) is an American professional stock car racing driver. He last competed part-time in the ARCA Menards Series, driving the No. 19 Chevrolet for Maples Motorsports, and the No. 53 Toyota for Tinkle Family Racing.

== Racing career ==
=== Early racing career ===
Tinkle started racing go karts and mini cup cars in the mid-2010s. In 2014, he won the Rookie of the Year award in the Central States Region Super Cups. He then won the series championship in 2017.

Tinkle won the Rockford Speedway MiniCup division championship in 2016.

In 2018, Tinkle moved to the Vore's Welding CRA Late Model Sportsman championship, and placed fifth in the championship.

In 2019, Tinkle returned to the Vore's Welding CRA Late Model Sportsman championship and scored two wins en route to the series championship, winning the 2019 CRA Late Model Sportsman Triple Crown and the 2019 Anderson Speedway McGunegill Engines Late Model Series championship. He is the first driver to have won all three in the same year.

In 2020, Tinkle ran part-time in the JEG'S / CRA All-Stars Tour and placed seventh in the championship. He again competed part-time in 2021. He also partook in Speedweeks at New Smyrna Speedway in the Pro Late Model division, where he scored one fastest qualifier and place seventh in points.

In 2021, Tinkle's racing career came to a halt when his father, Brad Tinkle, had a stroke. Tinkle started a GoFundMe in order to restart his racing career.

=== ARCA Menards Series ===
Tinkle announced that he had signed for one race with Wayne Peterson Racing on July 15, 2021, after Peterson needed a driver for the race. Peterson was impressed with Tinkle's performance, and signed him for three more races that year.

After Tim Richmond was injured at the 2021 Henry Ford Health System 200, Tinkle was announced to replace Richmond for the last four races of the season.

Tinkle returned to Wayne Peterson Racing for a majority of the schedule in 2022.

=== ARCA Menards Series East ===
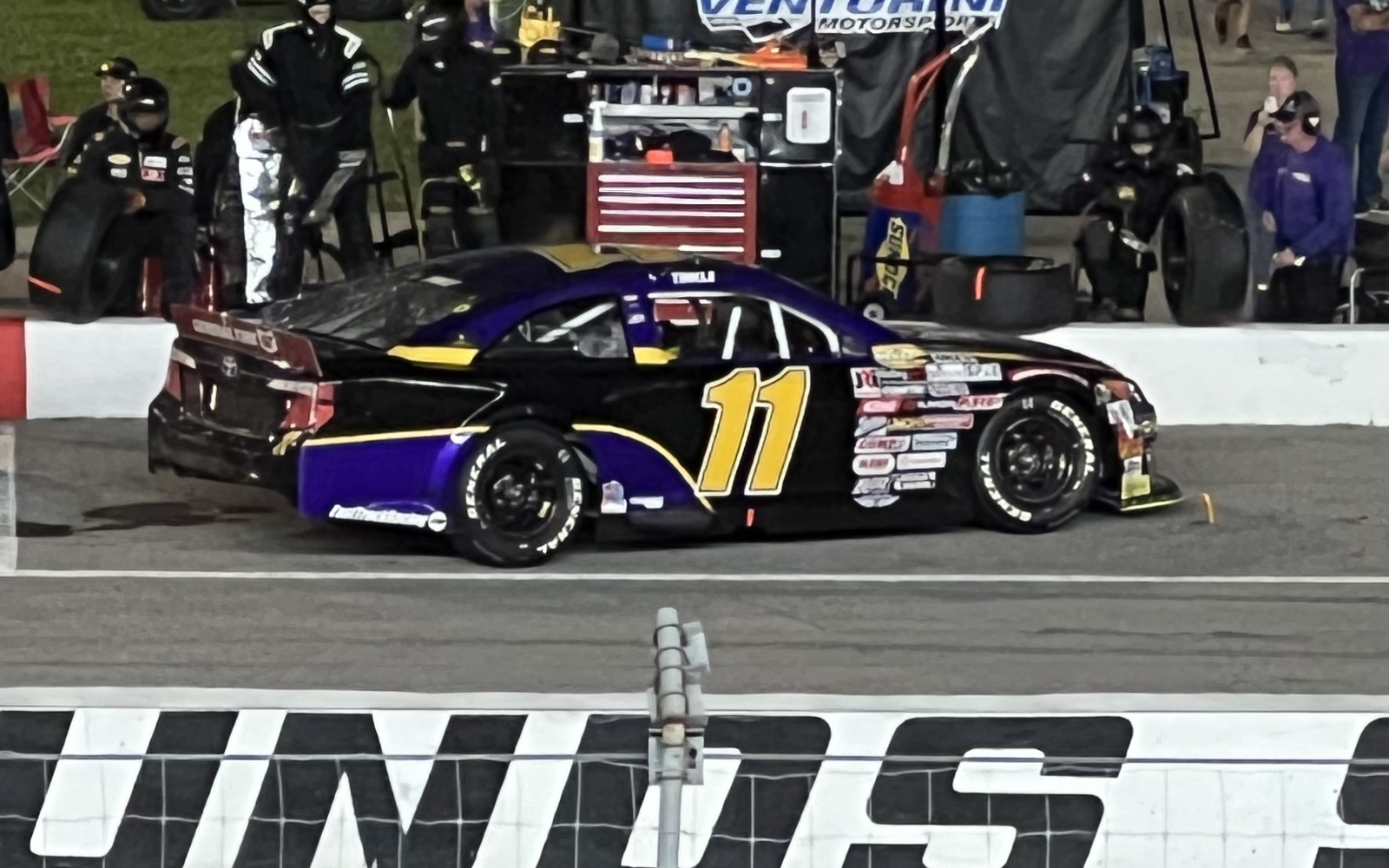
Tinkle's car at Fairgrounds Speedway in 2024.

Tinkle was scheduled make his debut in the 2021 Pensacola 200 in the 2021 ARCA Menards Series East season, driving the No. 22 for Brandon Oakley Racing. However, the team withdrew. He instead made his debut in the 2021 Bush's Beans 200 for Richmond Clubb Motorsports.

On December 6, 2022, Tinkle announced that he would run full-time in the East Series in 2023, driving the No. 11 car for Fast Track Racing.

In their first race together in a full-time capacity, Tinkle drove to a career-best seventh-place finish at the season opening race at Five Flags Speedway. He then finished sixth at the next race at Dover Motor Speedway.

On February 1, 2024, it was announced that Tinkle would return to FTR for a second full-time season in the East Series, driving the No. 11 car.

== Motorsports career results ==
=== Stock car career summary ===
Season	Series	Team	Races	Wins	Top 5	Top 10	Points	Position
2021	ARCA Menards Series East	Richmond Clubb Motorsports	1	0	0	0	24	52nd
2021	ARCA Menards Series	Wayne Peterson Racing	5	0	0	0	238	17th
2021	ARCA Menards Series	Richmond Clubb Motorsports	3	0	0	1	238	17th
2022	ARCA Menards Series West	Fast Track Racing	1	0	0	0	15	66th
2022	ARCA Menards Series East	Wayne Peterson Racing	2	0	0	0	148	14th
2022	ARCA Menards Series East	Fast Track Racing	2	0	0	0	148	14th
2022	ARCA Menards Series	Wayne Peterson Racing	9	0	0	0	619	9th
2022	ARCA Menards Series	Fast Track Racing	10	0	0	0	619	9th
2023	ARCA Menards Series East	Fast Track Racing	8	0	0	4	376	4th
2023	ARCA Menards Series	Fast Track Racing	8	0	0	1	235	19th
2024	ARCA Menards Series East	Fast Track Racing	8	0	2	4	371	4th
2024	ARCA Menards Series	Fast Track Racing	5	0	0	1	156	28th
2025	ARCA Menards Series East	Fast Track Racing	8	0	1	4	352	**3rd**
2025	ARCA Menards Series	Fast Track Racing	4	0	0	1	108	41st
2026	ARCA Menards Series West	Maples Motorsports	1	0	0	0	9	86th
2026	ARCA Menards Series East	Tinkle Family Racing	2	0	0	1	48	44th
2026	ARCA Menards Series	Maples Motorsports	1	0	0	0	92	46th
2026	ARCA Menards Series	Tinkle Family Racing	3	0	0	2	92	46th

=== ARCA Menards Series ===
(key) (Bold – Pole position awarded by qualifying time. Italics – Pole position earned by points standings or practice time. * – Most laps led.)

ARCA Menards Series results
Year	Team	No.	Make	1	2	3	4	5	6	7	8	9	10	11	12	13	14	15	16	17	18	19	20	AMSC	Pts	Ref
2021	Wayne Peterson Racing	06	Ford	DAY	PHO	TAL	KAN	TOL	CLT	MOH	POC	ELK	BLN; 13	IOW	WIN; 11	GLN	MCH; 15							17th	238	
2021	Wayne Peterson Racing	06	Chevy															ISF; 12	MLW					17th	238	
2021	Richmond Clubb Motorsports	27	Toyota																	DSF; 8	BRI; 20	SLM; 18		17th	238	
2021	Wayne Peterson Racing	27	Ford																				KAN; 17	17th	238	
2022	Wayne Peterson Racing	06	Chevy	DAY; 24		TAL; 20	KAN; 11	CLT; 17	IOW; 22															9th	619	
2022	Fast Track Racing	10	Toyota		PHO; 29					BLN; 13	ELK; 18	MOH												9th	619	
2022	Wayne Peterson Racing	06	Ford										POC; 26											9th	619	
2022	Wayne Peterson Racing	06	Toyota											IRP; 15	MCH; 21		ISF; 12							9th	619	
2022	Fast Track Racing	01	Ford													GLN; 23			DSF; 18	KAN; 20				9th	619	
2022	Fast Track Racing	12	Ford															MLW; 20				SLM; 17	TOL; 21	9th	619	
2022	Fast Track Racing	11	Ford																		BRI; 20			9th	619	
2023	Fast Track Racing	01	Ford	DAY	PHO	TAL	KAN; 27	CLT																19th	235	
2023	Fast Track Racing	11	Toyota						BLN; 9	ELK		IOW; 11	POC	MCH	IRP; 13	GLN	ISF	MLW; 13	DSF	KAN	BRI; 13	SLM; 11	TOL	19th	235	
2023	Fast Track Racing	12	Ford								MOH; 20													19th	235	
2024	Fast Track Racing	11	Toyota	DAY	PHO	TAL	DOV; 10	KAN	CLT	IOW; 20	MOH	BLN	IRP; 11	SLM	ELK	MCH	ISF	MLW; 12	DSF	GLN	BRI; 11	KAN	TOL	28th	156	
2025	Fast Track Racing	11	Toyota	DAY	PHO	TAL	KAN	CLT	MCH	BLN	ELK	LRP	DOV; 9	IRP; 16	IOW; 12	GLN	ISF	MAD	DSF	BRI; 31	SLM	KAN	TOL	41st	108	
2026	Maples Motorsports	19	Chevy	DAY	PHO; 35	KAN	TAL	GLN	TOL	MCH	POC													46th	92	
2026	Tinkle Family Racing	53	Toyota									BER; 9	ELK	CHI	LRP	IRP; 10	IOW	ISF	MAD	DSF	SLM	BRI; 30	KAN	46th	92	

==== ARCA Menards Series East ====
ARCA Menards Series East results
Year	Team	No.	Make	1	2	3	4	5	6	7	8	AMSEC	Pts	Ref
2021	Richmond Clubb Motorsports	27	Toyota	NSM	FIF	NSV	DOV	SNM	IOW	MLW	BRI; 20	52nd	24	
2022	Wayne Peterson Racing	0	Ford	NSM; 16	FIF	DOV	NSV					14th	148	
2022	Wayne Peterson Racing	06	Chevy					IOW; 22				14th	148	
2022	Fast Track Racing	12	Ford						MLW; 20			14th	148	
2022	Fast Track Racing	11	Ford							BRI; 20		14th	148	
2023	Fast Track Racing	11	Toyota	FIF; 7	DOV; 6	NSV; 7	FRS; 6	IOW; 11	IRP; 13	MLW; 13	BRI; 13	4th	376	
2024	Fast Track Racing	11	Toyota	FIF; 8	DOV; 10	NSV; 4	FRS; 5	IOW; 20	IRP; 11	MLW; 12	BRI; 11	4th	371	
2025	Fast Track Racing	11	Toyota	FIF; 10	CAR; 11	NSV; 5	FRS; 6	DOV; 9	IRP; 16	IOW; 12	BRI; 31	3rd	352	
2026	Tinkle Family Racing	53	Toyota	HCY	CAR	NSV	TOL	IRP; 10	FRS	IOW	BRI; 30	44th	48	

==== ARCA Menards Series West ====
(key) (Bold – Pole position awarded by qualifying time. Italics – Pole position earned by points standings or practice time. * – Most laps led.)

ARCA Menards Series West results
Year	Team	No.	Make	1	2	3	4	5	6	7	8	9	10	11	12	13	AMSWC	Pts	Ref
2022	Fast Track Racing	10	Toyota	PHO; 29	IRW	KCR	PIR	SON	IRW	EVG	PIR	AAS	LVS	PHO			66th	15	
2026	Maples Motorsports	19	Chevy	KER	PHO; 35	TUC	SHA	CNS	TRI	SON	PIR	AAS	MAD	LVS	PHO	KER	86th	9	
