= 2021 General Tire 200 (Talladega) =

Race details
- Race 3 of 20 of the 2021 ARCA Menards Series
- Date: April 24, 2021
- Official name: General Tire 200
- Location: Lincoln, Alabama, Talladega Superspeedway
- Course: Permanent racing facility
- Course length: 2.66 miles (4.281 km)
- Distance: 76 laps, 202.16 mi (325.344 km)
- Scheduled distance: 76 laps, 202.16 mi (325.344 km)
- Average speed: 124.173 miles per hour (199.837 km/h)

Pole position
| Driver | Ty Gibbs | Joe Gibbs Racing |
- Time: Set by 2020 owner's points and provisionals

Most laps led
| Driver | Drew Dollar; Bret Holmes | Venturini Motorsports; Bret Holmes Racing |
- Laps: 28

Winner
| No. 20 | Corey Heim | Venturini Motorsports |

Television in the United States
- Network: Fox Sports 1
- Announcers: Jamie Little, Ryan Blaney, Phil Parsons

Radio in the United States
- Radio: Motor Racing Network

The 2021 General Tire 200 was the third stock car race of the 2021 ARCA Menards Series season and the 59th iteration of the event. The race was held on Saturday, April 24, 2021, in Lincoln, Alabama at Talladega Superspeedway, a 2.66 miles (4.28 km) permanent triangle-shaped superspeedway. The race took the scheduled 76 laps to complete. At race's end, Corey Heim for Venturini Motorsports would hold off the field on a final lap restart to win his 3rd ARCA Menards Series win of his career and the second of the season. To fill out the podium, Dave Mader III of Spraker Racing Enterprises and Nick Sanchez of Rev Racing would finish second and third, respectively.

The race was marred by a crash involving Derrick Lancaster late in the race. With five to go, Lancaster hit the wall on the backstretch, resulting in a fiery crash. Lancaster would suffer numerous first, second, and third degree burns to his body and suffered pneumonia. The crash would lead to debate in within the Lancaster family if he should ever race again.

== Background ==
The layout of Talladega Superspeedway, the venue where the race was held.

Talladega Superspeedway, originally known as Alabama International Motor Superspeedway (AIMS), is a motorsports complex located north of Talladega, Alabama. It is located on the former Anniston Air Force Base in the small city of Lincoln. The track is a tri-oval and was constructed in the 1960s by the International Speedway Corporation, a business controlled by the France family. Talladega is most known for its steep banking and the unique location of the start/finish line that's located just past the exit to pit road. The track currently hosts the NASCAR series such as the NASCAR Cup Series, Xfinity Series and the Camping World Truck Series. Talladega is the longest NASCAR oval with a length of 2.66-mile-long (4.28 km) tri-oval like the Daytona International Speedway, which also is a 2.5-mile-long (4 km) tri-oval.

=== Entry list ===
| # | Driver | Team | Make | Sponsor |
|---|---|---|---|---|
| 01 | Michael Harper | Fast Track Racing | Ford | ACIE Dog Investments, Monster Truck Wars |
| 2 | Nick Sanchez | Rev Racing | Chevrolet | Eibach, Honda Generators |
| 02 | Toni Breidinger | Young's Motorsports | Chevrolet | Huda Beauty |
| 06 | Con Nicolopoulos | Wayne Peterson Racing | Chevrolet | Great Railing |
| 7 | Eric Caudell | CCM Racing | Ford | ETRM Software Consulting, Doug Design |
| 9 | Thomas Praytor | Max Force Racing | Chevrolet | Alabama Institute for the Deaf and Blind |
| 10 | Ed Pompa | Fast Track Racing | Chevrolet | Burt Crane & Rigging, Cen-Pe-Co Lubricants, Double "H" Ranch |
| 11 | Richard Garvie | Fast Track Racing | Ford | The Brews Box |
| 12 | D. L. Wilson | Fast Track Racing | Toyota | Leggott Tractors of Waco, The Center for Factual Innocence |
| 15 | Drew Dollar | Venturini Motorsports | Toyota | Sunbelt Rentals |
| 18 | Ty Gibbs | Joe Gibbs Racing | Toyota | Joe Gibbs Racing |
| 20 | Corey Heim | Venturini Motorsports | Toyota | JBL |
| 21 | Jack Wood | GMS Racing | Chevrolet | Chevrolet Accessories |
| 23 | Bret Holmes | Bret Holmes Racing | Chevrolet | Golden Eagle Syrup |
| 25 | Gracie Trotter | Venturini Motorsports | Toyota | Mobil 1 |
| 27 | Tim Richmond | Richmond Clubb Motorsports | Toyota | Immigration Law Center |
| 28 | Kyle Sieg | RSS Racing | Chevrolet | C2 Freight Resources |
| 29 | Derrick Lancaster | Derrick Lancaster Racing | Toyota | Total Car & Truck Service, RGM Erectors |
| 35 | Greg Van Alst | Greg Van Alst Motorsports | Chevrolet | CB Fabricating |
| 36 | Ryan Huff | Huff Racing | Ford | Land & Coates Outdoor Power Equipment |
| 44 | John Ferrier | Ferrier-McClure Racing | Chevrolet | Ferrier-McClure Racing |
| 46 | Thad Moffitt | David Gilliland Racing | Ford | Aqua ChemPacs, CleanPacs |
| 48 | Brad Smith | Brad Smith Motorsports | Chevrolet | Henshaw Automation |
| 57 | Bryan Dauzat | Brother-In-Law Racing | Chevrolet | O. B. Builders Door & Trim |
| 63 | Dave Mader III | Spraker Racing Enterprises | Chevrolet | American Apparel, Diamond C Ranch |
| 69 | Scott Melton | Kimmel Racing | Ford | Melton-McFadden Insurance Agency |
| 73 | Andy Jankowiak | Jankowiak Motorsports | Ford | V1 Fiber |
| 94 | Benny Chastain | Cram Racing Enterprises | Toyota | Cram Racing Enterprises |
| 97 | Jason Kitzmiller | CR7 Motorsports | Chevrolet | A. L. L. Construction |
Official entry list

== Starting lineup ==
No qualifying session was held; instead, the lineup was determined by the previous season's owner's points and provisionals. As a result, Ty Gibbs of Joe Gibbs Racing won the pole.

| Pos. | # | Driver | Team | Make |
|---|---|---|---|---|
| 1 | 18 | Ty Gibbs | Joe Gibbs Racing | Toyota |
| 2 | 23 | Bret Holmes | Bret Holmes Racing | Chevrolet |
| 3 | 25 | Gracie Trotter | Venturini Motorsports | Toyota |
| 4 | 20 | Corey Heim | Venturini Motorsports | Toyota |
| 5 | 46 | Thad Moffitt | David Gilliland Racing | Ford |
| 6 | 15 | Drew Dollar | Venturini Motorsports | Toyota |
| 7 | 12 | D. L. Wilson | Fast Track Racing | Toyota |
| 8 | 10 | Ed Pompa | Fast Track Racing | Chevrolet |
| 9 | 27 | Tim Richmond | Richmond Clubb Motorsports | Toyota |
| 10 | 11 | Richard Garvie | Fast Track Racing | Ford |
| 11 | 48 | Brad Smith | Brad Smith Motorsports | Chevrolet |
| 12 | 21 | Jack Wood | GMS Racing | Chevrolet |
| 13 | 35 | Greg Van Alst | Greg Van Alst Motorsports | Chevrolet |
| 14 | 69 | Scott Melton | Kimmel Racing | Ford |
| 15 | 06 | Con Nicolopoulos | Wayne Peterson Racing | Chevrolet |
| 16 | 97 | Jason Kitzmiller | CR7 Motorsports | Chevrolet |
| 17 | 7 | Eric Caudell | CCM Racing | Ford |
| 18 | 01 | Michael Harper | Fast Track Racing | Ford |
| 19 | 63 | Dave Mader III | Spraker Racing Enterprises | Chevrolet |
| 20 | 9 | Thomas Praytor | Max Force Racing | Chevrolet |
| 21 | 57 | Bryan Dauzat | Brother-In-Law Racing | Chevrolet |
| 22 | 2 | Nick Sanchez | Rev Racing | Chevrolet |
| 23 | 29 | Derrick Lancaster | Derrick Lancaster Racing | Toyota |
| 24 | 28 | Kyle Sieg | RSS Racing | Chevrolet |
| 25 | 44 | John Ferrier | Ferrier-McClure Racing | Chevrolet |
| 26 | 02 | Toni Breidinger | Young's Motorsports | Chevrolet |
| 27 | 73 | Andy Jankowiak | Jankowiak Motorsports | Ford |
| 28 | 94 | Benny Chastain | Cram Racing Enterprises | Toyota |
| 29 | 36 | Ryan Huff | Huff Racing | Ford |
Official starting lineup

== Race results ==
| Fin | St | # | Driver | Team | Make | Laps | Led | Status | Pts |
|---|---|---|---|---|---|---|---|---|---|
| 1 | 4 | 20 | Corey Heim | Venturini Motorsports | Toyota | 76 | 5 | Running | 47 |
| 2 | 19 | 63 | Dave Mader III | Spraker Racing Enterprises | Chevrolet | 76 | 0 | Running | 42 |
| 3 | 22 | 2 | Nick Sanchez | Rev Racing | Chevrolet | 76 | 0 | Running | 41 |
| 4 | 6 | 15 | Drew Dollar | Venturini Motorsports | Toyota | 76 | 28 | Running | 42 |
| 5 | 2 | 23 | Bret Holmes | Bret Holmes Racing | Chevrolet | 76 | 28 | Running | 41 |
| 6 | 5 | 46 | Thad Moffitt | David Gilliland Racing | Ford | 76 | 0 | Running | 38 |
| 7 | 27 | 73 | Andy Jankowiak | Jankowiak Motorsports | Ford | 76 | 0 | Running | 37 |
| 8 | 24 | 28 | Kyle Sieg | RSS Racing | Chevrolet | 76 | 0 | Running | 36 |
| 9 | 17 | 7 | Eric Caudell | CCM Racing | Ford | 76 | 0 | Running | 35 |
| 10 | 14 | 69 | Scott Melton | Kimmel Racing | Ford | 76 | 0 | Running | 34 |
| 11 | 12 | 21 | Jack Wood | GMS Racing | Chevrolet | 76 | 0 | Running | 33 |
| 12 | 26 | 02 | Toni Breidinger | Young's Motorsports | Chevrolet | 76 | 0 | Running | 32 |
| 13 | 8 | 10 | Ed Pompa | Fast Track Racing | Chevrolet | 76 | 0 | Running | 31 |
| 14 | 29 | 36 | Ryan Huff | Huff Racing | Ford | 76 | 0 | Running | 30 |
| 15 | 16 | 97 | Jason Kitzmiller | CR7 Motorsports | Chevrolet | 76 | 0 | Running | 29 |
| 16 | 18 | 01 | Michael Harper | Fast Track Racing | Ford | 76 | 1 | Running | 29 |
| 17 | 20 | 9 | Thomas Praytor | Max Force Racing | Chevrolet | 76 | 0 | Running | 27 |
| 18 | 21 | 57 | Bryan Dauzat | Brother-In-Law Racing | Chevrolet | 76 | 0 | Running | 26 |
| 19 | 7 | 12 | D. L. Wilson | Fast Track Racing | Toyota | 76 | 0 | Running | 25 |
| 20 | 15 | 06 | Con Nicolopoulos | Wayne Peterson Racing | Chevrolet | 74 | 0 | Running | 24 |
| 21 | 28 | 94 | Benny Chastain | Cram Racing Enterprises | Toyota | 74 | 0 | Running | 23 |
| 22 | 3 | 25 | Gracie Trotter | Venturini Motorsports | Toyota | 74 | 0 | Running | 22 |
| 23 | 23 | 29 | Derrick Lancaster | Derrick Lancaster Racing | Toyota | 71 | 1 | Accident | 22 |
| 24 | 9 | 27 | Tim Richmond | Richmond Clubb Motorsports | Toyota | 70 | 0 | Running | 20 |
| 25 | 10 | 11 | Richard Garvie | Fast Track Racing | Ford | 64 | 0 | Running | 19 |
| 26 | 13 | 35 | Greg Van Alst | Greg Van Alst Motorsports | Chevrolet | 61 | 0 | Accident | 18 |
| 27 | 1 | 18 | Ty Gibbs | Joe Gibbs Racing | Toyota | 61 | 11 | Accident | 18 |
| 28 | 25 | 44 | John Ferrier | Ferrier-McClure Racing | Chevrolet | 61 | 0 | Accident | 16 |
| 29 | 11 | 48 | Brad Smith | Brad Smith Motorsports | Chevrolet | 51 | 0 | Vibration | 15 |
Official race results

| Previous race: 2021 General Tire 150 (Phoenix) | ARCA Menards Series; 2021 season | Next race: 2021 Dutch Boy 150 |
