= Ed Pompa =

American professional stock car racing driver

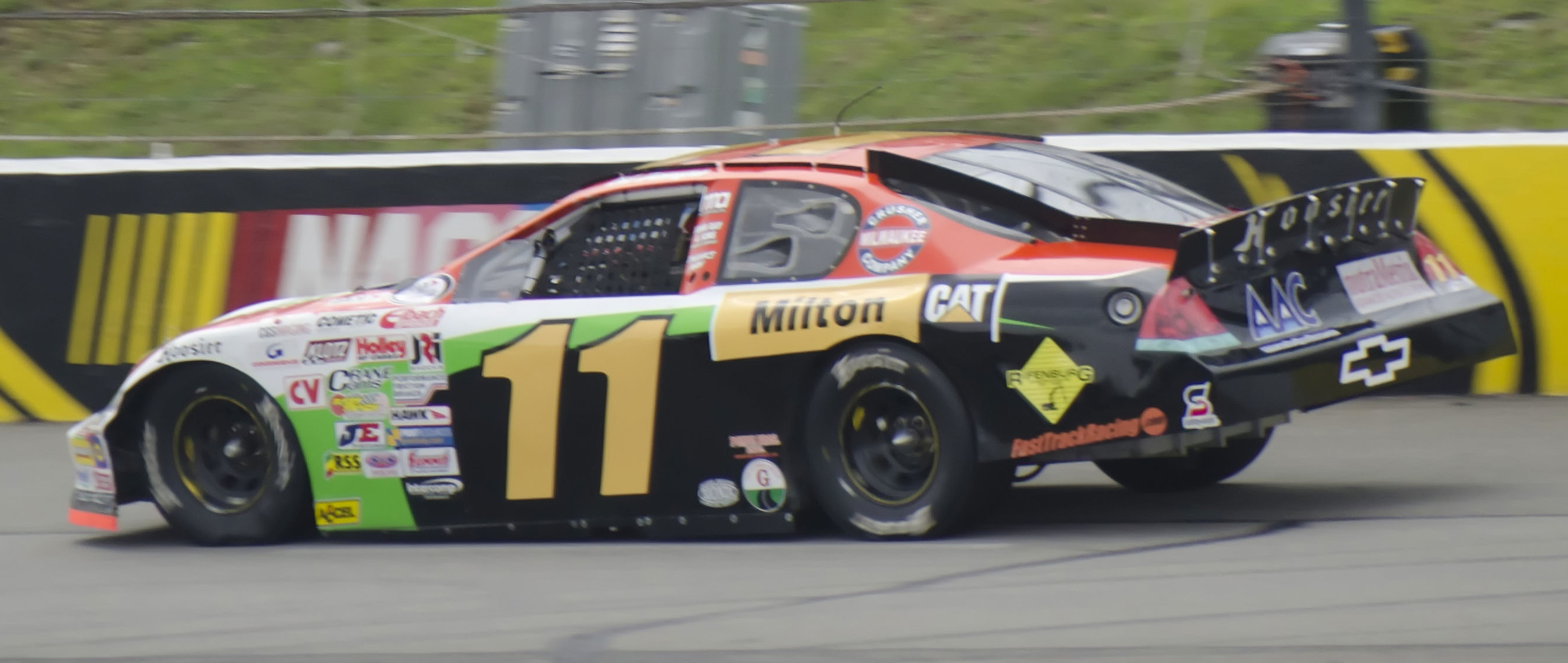
- Pompa's No. 11 car at Pocono Raceway in 2011
- Born: December 14, 1962 (age 63); Ballston Spa, New York, U.S.

ARCA Menards Series career
- 100 races run over 20 years
- Best finish: 14th (2016)
- First race: 2006 Pennsylvania 200 (Pocono)
- Last race: 2026 Menards 150 (Kansas)
Wins	Top tens	Poles
0	3	0

ARCA Menards Series East career
- 7 races run over 5 years
- Best finish: 39th (2020)
- First race: 2020 General Tire 125 (Dover)
- Last race: 2024 General Tire 150 (Dover)
Wins	Top tens	Poles
0	4	0
- Statistics up to date as of September 25, 2026.

Ed Pompa (born December 14, 1962) is an American professional stock car racing driver. He last competed part-time in the ARCA Menards Series, driving the No. 10 for Fast Track Racing.

== Racing career ==
=== ARCA Menards Series ===
Pompa would get his start in the ARCA Re/Max Series in 2006, driving a Pontiac for Andy Belmont Racing, finishing 25th.

From 2008 to the present, Pompa has then made select starts for various cars for Fast Track Racing each season. In 2010, he would suffer his first retirement at New Jersey Motorsports Park due to handling issues.

In 2017, Pompa would run a Clemson Tigers scheme after the team won the 2017 championship, after asking Clemson president James P. Clements.

In 2018, Pompa would crash out of the first Pocono race that year on lap 57, making the race his first DNF at Pocono.

== Personal life ==
Pompa is a major supporter and has raced to raise money for Double "H" Ranch, a camp for children with life-threatening illnesses. In 2015, Double "H" Ranch reported that Pompa had raised about $140,000 for the camp.

Pompa has a son, who graduated in 2012 from Clemson University.

== Motorsports career results ==
=== Stock car career summary ===
Season	Series	Team	Races	Wins	Top 5	Top 10	Points	Position
2006	ARCA Re/Max Series	Andy Belmont Racing	1	0	0	0	105	142nd
2008	ARCA Re/Max Series	Fast Track Racing	1	0	0	0	100	131st
2009	ARCA Re/Max Series	Fast Track Racing	1	0	0	0	95	143rd
2010	ARCA Racing Series	Fast Track Racing	3	0	0	0	285	70th
2011	ARCA Racing Series	Fast Track Racing	2	0	0	0	170	103rd
2012	ARCA Racing Series	Fast Track Racing	6	0	0	0	705	33rd
2013	ARCA Racing Series	Fast Track Racing	4	0	0	0	505	54th
2014	ARCA Racing Series	Fast Track Racing	6	0	0	0	845	31st
2015	ARCA Racing Series	Fast Track Racing	12	0	0	0	1760	16th
2016	ARCA Racing Series	Fast Track Racing	13	0	0	1	2010	14th
2017	ARCA Racing Series	Fast Track Racing	7	0	0	0	845	32nd
2018	ARCA Racing Series	Fast Track Racing	5	0	0	0	560	36th
2019	ARCA Menards Series	Fast Track Racing	5	0	0	0	635	26th
2020	ARCA Menards Series East	Fast Track Racing	1	0	0	0	31	39th
2020	ARCA Menards Series	Fast Track Racing	2	0	0	1	67	43rd
2021	ARCA Menards Series East	Fast Track Racing	1	0	0	1	34	40th
2021	ARCA Menards Series	Fast Track Racing	4	0	0	0	118	31st
2022	ARCA Menards Series East	Fast Track Racing	2	0	0	1	63	30th
2022	ARCA Menards Series	Fast Track Racing	4	0	0	0	111	32nd
2023	ARCA Menards Series East	Fast Track Racing	2	0	0	2	70	25th
2023	ARCA Menards Series	Fast Track Racing	6	0	0	1	177	26th
2024	ARCA Menards Series East	Fast Track Racing	1	0	0	0	31	49th
2024	ARCA Menards Series	Fast Track Racing	5	0	0	0	105	42nd
2025	ARCA Menards Series	Fast Track Racing	7	0	0	0	170	22nd
2026	ARCA Menards Series	Fast Track Racing	7	0	0	0	184	25th

=== ARCA Menards Series ===
(key) (Bold – Pole position awarded by qualifying time. Italics – Pole position earned by points standings or practice time. * – Most laps led.)

ARCA Menards Series results
Year	Team	No.	Make	1	2	3	4	5	6	7	8	9	10	11	12	13	14	15	16	17	18	19	20	21	22	23	AMSC	Pts	Ref
2006	Andy Belmont Racing	1	Pontiac	DAY	NSH	SLM	WIN	KEN	TOL	POC	MCH	KAN	KEN	BLN	POC; 25	GTW	NSH	MCH	ISF	MIL	TOL	DSF	CHI	SLM	TAL	IOW	142nd	105	
2008	Fast Track Racing	14	Chevy	DAY	SLM	IOW	KAN	CAR	KEN	TOL	POC	MCH	CAY	KEN	BLN	POC; 14	NSH	ISF	DSF	CHI	SLM	NJM	TAL	TOL			131st	100	
2009	Fast Track Racing	10	Chevy	DAY	SLM	CAR	TAL	KEN	TOL	POC	MCH	MFD	IOW	KEN	BLN	POC; 27	ISF	CHI	TOL	DSF	NJM	SLM	KAN	CAR			143rd	95	
2010	Fast Track Racing	10	Chevy	DAY	PBE	SLM	TEX	TAL	TOL	POC; 18	MCH	IOW	MFD	POC; 32	BLN	NJM; 31	ISF	CHI	DSF	TOL	SLM	KAN	CAR				70th	285	
2011	Fast Track Racing	10	Chevy	DAY; 36	TAL	SLM	TOL	NJM	CHI	POC	MCH	WIN	BLN	IOW	IRP												103rd	170	
2011	Fast Track Racing	11	Chevy													POC; 22	ISF	MAD	DSF	SLM	KAN	TOL					103rd	170	
2012	Fast Track Racing	10	Chevy	DAY; 31	MOB	SLM	TAL	TOL	ELK	POC; 18	MCH	WIN					POC; 17	BLN	ISF	MAD			KAN; 23				33rd	705	
2012	Fast Track Racing	10	Ford										NJM; 30	IOW	CHI	IRP											33rd	705	
2012	Fast Track Racing	10	Dodge																		SLM; 16	DSF					33rd	705	
2013	Fast Track Racing	10	Chevy	DAY; 25	MOB	SLM	TAL	TOL	ELK	POC; 21	MCH	ROA	WIN	CHI	NJM	POC; 23	BLN	ISF	MAD	DSF	IOW	SLM; 14	KEN	KAN			54th	505	
2014	Fast Track Racing	06	Chevy	DAY; 26	MOB	SLM																					31st	845	
2014	Fast Track Racing	10	Chevy				TAL; 21	TOL	NJM	POC; 15	MCH	ELK	WIN	CHI	IRP	POC; 13	BLN	ISF	MAD	DSF	SLM; 17	KEN	KAN; 15				31st	845	
2015	Fast Track Racing	06	Chevy	DAY; 30	MOB	NSH	SLM																				16th	1,760	
2015	Fast Track Racing	10	Chevy					TAL; 17	TOL		POC; 14	MCH	CHI; 18	WIN	IOW	IRP	POC; 19						KAN; 19				16th	1,760	
2015	Fast Track Racing	10	Ford							NJM; 17								BLN; 19	ISF; 25	DSF; 23	SLM; 21	KEN; 28					16th	1,760	
2016	Fast Track Racing	10	Chevy	DAY; 17			TAL; 18	TOL		POC; 21	MCH	MAD; 11	WIN	IOW	IRP		BLN; 9	ISF		SLM; 15							14th	2,010	
2016	Fast Track Racing	11	Ford		NSH; 31	SLM													DSF; 20		CHI; 31		KAN; 17				14th	2,010	
2016	Fast Track Racing	10	Ford						NJM; 13																		14th	2,010	
2016	Fast Track Racing	27	Ford													POC; 13											14th	2,010	
2016	Fast Track Racing	1	Ford																			KEN; 30					14th	2,010	
2017	Fast Track Racing	10	Chevy	DAY; 30	NSH	SLM	TAL; 24	TOL	ELK																		32nd	845	
2017	Fast Track Racing	10	Ford							POC; 19	MCH	MAD	IOW	IRP				ROA; 26	DSF				KAN; 24				32nd	845	
2017	Fast Track Racing	10	Toyota												POC; 16	WIN	ISF			SLM; 14	CHI	KEN					32nd	845	
2018	Fast Track Racing	22	Toyota	DAY; 35	NSH	SLM																					36th	560	
2018	Fast Track Racing	11	Toyota				TAL; 29	TOL	CLT												SLM; 17	IRP	KAN				36th	560	
2018	Fast Track Racing	10	Ford							POC; 23	MCH	MAD	GTW	CHI	IOW	ELK											36th	560	
2018	Fast Track Racing	11	Ford														POC; 14	ISF	BLN	DSF							36th	560	
2019	Fast Track Racing	1	Chevy	DAY	FIF	SLM	TAL; 21	NSH	TOL	CLT	POC; 12	MCH	MAD	GTW	CHI	ELK	IOW	POC; 13	ISF	DSF							26th	635	
2019	Fast Track Racing	11	Toyota																		SLM; 11	IRP	KAN; 15				26th	635	
2020	Fast Track Racing	12	Chevy	DAY	PHO	TAL; 10	POC; 11	IRP	KEN	IOW	KAN	TOL	TOL	MCH	DAY	GTW	L44	TOL	BRI	WIN	MEM	ISF	KAN				43rd	67	
2021	Fast Track Racing	10	Chevy	DAY	PHO	TAL; 13	KAN	TOL	CLT	MOH	POC; 13	ELK	BLN	IOW	WIN												31st	118	
2021	Fast Track Racing	11	Toyota													GLN; 18	MCH	ISF	MLW	DSF	BRI						31st	118	
2021	Fast Track Racing	10	Toyota																			SLM; 14	KAN				31st	118	
2022	Fast Track Racing	11	Ford	DAY	PHO	TAL	KAN	CLT	IOW	BLN; 17	ELK	MOH															32nd	111	
2022	Fast Track Racing	44	Toyota										POC; 20	IRP	MCH												32nd	111	
2022	Fast Track Racing	12	Toyota													GLN; 17	ISF	MLW	DSF	KAN	BRI						32nd	111	
2022	Fast Track Racing	11	Toyota																			SLM; 11	TOL				32nd	111	
2023	Fast Track Racing	10	Chevy	DAY; 22	PHO	TAL; 13	KAN																				26th	177	
2023	Fast Track Racing	10	Toyota					CLT; 16	BLN	ELK	MOH	IOW	POC; 15	MCH	IRP	GLN; 13	ISF	MLW	DSF	KAN	BRI						26th	177	
2023	Fast Track Racing	12	Ford																			SLM; 8	TOL				26th	177	
2024	Fast Track Racing	10	Chevy	DAY; 40	PHO																						42nd	105	
2024	Fast Track Racing	10	Toyota			TAL; 21														GLN; 22	BRI	KAN	TOL				42nd	105	
2024	Fast Track Racing	10	Ford				DOV; 13	KAN	CLT	IOW	MOH	BLN	IRP	SLM; 19	ELK	MCH	ISF	MLW	DSF								42nd	105	
2025	Fast Track Racing	10	Ford	DAY; 13	PHO	TAL; 30	KAN	CLT	MCH	BLN	ELK								DSF; 12	BRI	SLM; 14	KAN; 27	TOL; Wth				22nd	170	
2025	Fast Track Racing	10	Toyota									LRP; 20	DOV	IRP	IOW	GLN; 22	ISF	MAD									22nd	170	
2026	Fast Track Racing	10	Chevy	DAY; 21	PHO	KAN	TAL; 16				POC; 14	BER	ELK	CHI									KAN; 16				25th	184	
2026	Fast Track Racing	10	Toyota					GLN; 17	TOL	MCH					LRP; 28	IRP	IOW	ISF	MAD	DSF							25th	184	
2026	Fast Track Racing	10	Ford																		SLM; 12	BRI					25th	184	

==== ARCA Menards Series East ====
ARCA Menards Series East results
Year	Team	No.	Make	1	2	3	4	5	6	7	8	AMSEC	Pts	Ref
2020	Fast Track Racing	11	Toyota	NSM	TOL	DOV; 13	TOL	BRI	FIF			39th	31	
2021	Fast Track Racing	10	Toyota	NSM	FIF	NSV	DOV; 10	SNM	IOW	MLW	BRI	40th	34	
2022	Fast Track Racing	10	Toyota	NSM; 10	FIF							30th	63	
2022	Fast Track Racing	11	Ford			DOV; 15	NSV	IOW	MLW	BRI		30th	63	
2023	Fast Track Racing	10	Ford	FIF; 10	DOV; 8	NSV	FRS	IOW	IRP	MLW	BRI	25th	70	
2024	Fast Track Racing	10	Ford	FIF; Wth	DOV; 13	NSV	FRS	IOW	IRP	MLW	BRI	49th	31	
