= 2021 Zinsser SmartCoat 200 =

Race details
- Race 10 of 20 of the 2021 ARCA Menards Series; Race 4 of 10 of the 2021 Sioux Chief Showdown
- Date: July 17, 2021
- Official name: Zinsser SmartCoat 200
- Location: Marne, Michigan, Berlin Raceway
- Course: Permanent racing facility
- Course length: 0.705 km (0.438 miles)
- Distance: 200 laps, 87.6 mi (140.98 km)
- Scheduled distance: 200 laps, 87.6 mi (140.98 km)
- Average speed: 66.715 miles per hour (107.367 km/h)

Pole position
Driver	Daniel Dye	GMS Racing
- Time: 16.468

Most laps led
Driver	Daniel Dye	GMS Racing
- Laps: 198

Winner
No. 21	Daniel Dye	GMS Racing

Television in the United States
- Network: MAVTV
- Announcers: Bob Dillner, Jim Trebow

Radio in the United States
- Radio: ARCA Racing Network

The 2021 Zinsser SmartCoat 200 was the 10th race of the 2021 ARCA Menards Series season, the fourth race of the 2021 Sioux Chief Showdown, and the 21st iteration of the event. The race was held on Saturday, July 17, 2021 in Marne, Michigan at Berlin Raceway, a 7/16 mile (0.70 km) permanent oval-shaped racetrack. The race took the scheduled 200 laps to complete. At race's end, Daniel Dye of GMS Racing would dominate, leading almost every single lap and win his first ever ARCA Menards Series win. To fill out the podium Ty Gibbs of Joe Gibbs Racing and Corey Heim of Venturini Motorsports would finish second and third, respectively.

== Background ==
Berlin Raceway is a 7/16 mile long paved oval race track in Marne, Michigan, near Grand Rapids. The track races weekly as part of NASCAR's Whelen All-American Series. It currently hosts a race in the ARCA Menards Series East tour. The track has held touring series events on the ARCA Menards Series, American Speed Association National Tour, USAC Stock Cars, USAC Silver Crown, World of Outlaws Sprint cars, and World of Outlaws Late Model Series tours.

The track opened in 1950. It was originally a horse track before World War II. Berlin's current track record is 12.513 seconds, set by Brian Gerster in 2018 in a winged sprint car. Berlin Raceway takes its name from the city of Marne's original name "Berlin," which was changed due to Anti-German sentiment following World War I.

The track was developed by the Chester Mysliwiec family in 1950. It was purchased by the West Michigan Whitecaps in 2001. The group made numerous improvements to the facilities such as new bathrooms, updated catch fences, and a new sound system. Dirt was temporarily placed over the pavement after the 2017 regular season and three touring series visited the track in September / October - American Ethanol Late Model Tour, American Ethanol Modified Tour and Engine Pro Sprints On Dirt. Some racing scenes for the movie God Bless the Broken Road were recorded at the track in early 2016 for the 2018 film. The track dropped its Super Stock and Modified classes in 2020 and added a class of Limited Late Models. Other classes include Super Late Models, Sportsman, 4 Cylinder, and Mini-Wedges.

=== Entry list ===
#	Driver	Team	Make	Sponsor
01	Mike Basham	Fast Track Racing	Ford	Academy Mortgage
2	Nick Sanchez	Rev Racing	Chevrolet	Universal Technical Institute, NASCAR Technical Institute
06	Zachary Tinkle	Wayne Peterson Racing	Ford	Great Railing
10	Owen Smith	Fast Track Racing	Toyota	Szulczewski Financial Group, Double "H" Ranch
11	Mason Mingus	Fast Track Racing	Ford	Diamond Equipment, TC Construction
12	Tony Cosentino	Fast Track Racing	Toyota	The Brews Box
15	Jesse Love	Venturini Motorsports	Toyota	Mobil 1
17	Taylor Gray	David Gilliland Racing	Ford	Ripper Coffee Company
18	Ty Gibbs	Joe Gibbs Racing	Toyota	Joe Gibbs Racing
20	Corey Heim	Venturini Motorsports	Toyota	Craftsman
21	Daniel Dye	GMS Racing	Chevrolet	Solar Fit, Race to Stop Suicide
25	Gracie Trotter	Venturini Motorsports	Toyota	Calico Coatings
27	Alex Clubb	Richmond Clubb Motorsports	Ford	Richmond Clubb Motorsports
30	Adam Lemke*	Rette Jones Racing	Ford	JRi Shocks
46	Thad Moffitt	David Gilliland Racing	Ford	Clean Harbors
48	Brad Smith	Brad Smith Motorsports	Chevrolet	Henshaw Automation
50	Morgan Alexander	Niece Motorsports	Chevrolet	Alexander Produce
Official entry list

== Practice ==
=== First and final practice ===
The only 45-minute practice session would take place on Saturday, July 17, at 4:15 PM EST. Ty Gibbs of Joe Gibbs Racing would set the fastest lap in the session, with a lap of 16.727 and an average speed of 94.159 miles per hour (151.534 km/h).

Pos.	#	Driver	Team	Make	Time	Speed
1	18	Ty Gibbs	Joe Gibbs Racing	Toyota	16.727	94.159
2	21	Daniel Dye	GMS Racing	Chevrolet	16.761	93.968
3	20	Corey Heim	Venturini Motorsports	Toyota	16.790	93.806
Full practice results

== Qualifying ==
Qualifying would take place on Saturday, July 17, at 6:00 PM EST. Each driver would have two laps to have a chance to set a lap, and the fastest of the two would be taken. Daniel Dye of GMS Racing would win the pole, setting a time of 16.468 and an average speed of 95.640 miles per hour (153.918 km/h).

=== Full qualifying results ===
Pos.	#	Driver	Team	Make	Time	Speed
1	21	Daniel Dye	GMS Racing	Chevrolet	16.468	95.640
2	18	Ty Gibbs	Joe Gibbs Racing	Toyota	16.518	95.351
3	20	Corey Heim	Venturini Motorsports	Toyota	16.626	94.731
4	17	Taylor Gray	David Gilliland Racing	Ford	16.747	94.047
5	15	Jesse Love	Venturini Motorsports	Toyota	16.750	94.030
6	2	Nick Sanchez	Rev Racing	Chevrolet	16.759	93.979
7	46	Thad Moffitt	David Gilliland Racing	Ford	16.784	93.839
8	50	Morgan Alexander	Niece Motorsports	Chevrolet	16.893	93.234
9	25	Gracie Trotter	Venturini Motorsports	Toyota	16.940	92.975
10	11	Mason Mingus	Fast Track Racing	Ford	16.980	92.756
11	27	Alex Clubb	Richmond Clubb Motorsports	Ford	17.408	90.476
12	10	Owen Smith	Fast Track Racing	Toyota	17.605	89.463
13	06	Zachary Tinkle	Wayne Peterson Racing	Ford	17.874	88.117
14	12	Tony Cosentino	Fast Track Racing	Toyota	17.899	87.994
15	01	Mike Basham	Fast Track Racing	Ford	18.061	87.204
16	48	Brad Smith	Brad Smith Motorsports	Chevrolet	18.640	84.496
Official qualifying results

== Race results ==
Fin	St	#	Driver	Team	Make	Laps	Led	Status	Pts
1	1	21	Daniel Dye	GMS Racing	Chevrolet	200	198	running	49
2	2	18	Ty Gibbs	Joe Gibbs Racing	Toyota	200	2	running	43
3	3	20	Corey Heim	Venturini Motorsports	Toyota	200	0	running	41
4	4	17	Taylor Gray	David Gilliland Racing	Ford	200	0	running	40
5	5	15	Jesse Love	Venturini Motorsports	Toyota	200	0	running	39
6	6	2	Nick Sanchez	Rev Racing	Chevrolet	200	0	running	38
7	10	11	Mason Mingus	Fast Track Racing	Ford	199	0	running	37
8	9	25	Gracie Trotter	Venturini Motorsports	Toyota	199	0	running	36
9	12	10	Owen Smith	Fast Track Racing	Toyota	196	0	running	35
10	8	50	Morgan Alexander	Niece Motorsports	Chevrolet	195	0	running	34
11	11	27	Alex Clubb	Richmond Clubb Motorsports	Ford	187	0	running	33
12	7	46	Thad Moffitt	David Gilliland Racing	Ford	156	0	power steering	32
13	13	06	Zachary Tinkle	Wayne Peterson Racing	Ford	141	0	running	31
14	16	48	Brad Smith	Brad Smith Motorsports	Chevrolet	25	0	brakes	30
15	14	12	Tony Cosentino	Fast Track Racing	Toyota	14	0	handling	29
16	15	01	Mike Basham	Fast Track Racing	Ford	11	0	handling	28
Withdrew
WD		30	Adam Lemke	Rette Jones Racing	Ford				

Previous race: 2021 Menards 250	ARCA Menards Series; 2021 season	Next race: 2021 Shore Lunch 150
