= 2021 Menards 250 =

Race details
- Race 9 of 20 of the 2021 ARCA Menards Series; Race 3 of 10 of the 2021 Sioux Chief Showdown
- Date: July 10, 2021
- Official name: Menards 250
- Location: Elko New Market, Minnesota, Elko Speedway
- Course: Permanent racing facility
- Course length: 0.604 km (0.375 miles)
- Distance: 250 laps, 93.750 mi (150.876 km)
- Scheduled distance: 250 laps, 93.750 mi (150.876 km)
- Average speed: 69.274 miles per hour (111.486 km/h)

Pole position
Driver	Ty Gibbs	Joe Gibbs Racing
- Time: 14.469

Most laps led
Driver	Ty Gibbs	Joe Gibbs Racing
- Laps: 236

Winner
No. 20	Corey Heim	Venturini Motorsports

Television in the United States
- Network: MAVTV
- Announcers: Bob Dillner, Jim Trebow

Radio in the United States
- Radio: ARCA Racing Network

The 2021 Menards 250 was the ninth race of the 2021 ARCA Menards Series season, the third race of the 2021 Sioux Chief Showdown, and the seventh iteration of the event. The race was held on Saturday, July 10, 2021, in Elko New Market, Minnesota at Elko Speedway, a 3/8 mile (0.60 km) permanent oval-shaped racetrack. The race took the scheduled 250 laps to complete. In a fierce battle in the closing laps, Corey Heim of Venturini Motorsports and Ty Gibbs of Joe Gibbs Racing would battle with three to go, with Heim besting Gibbs for his fifth career ARCA Menards Series win, the fourth of the season, and the second straight win for Heim.

== Background ==
Elko Speedway, is a 3/8 mile asphalt oval NASCAR-sanctioned race track located in Elko New Market, Minnesota. Elko Speedway is a track in the NASCAR Advance Auto Parts Weekly Series. The track is located in the former Elko portion of the merged city.

=== Entry list ===
#	Driver	Team	Make	Sponsor
01	Owen Smith	Fast Track Racing	Ford	Academy Mortgage
2	Nick Sanchez	Rev Racing	Chevrolet	Universal Technical Institute, NASCAR Technical Institute
06	Wayne Peterson	Wayne Peterson Racing	Ford	Great Railing
7	Eric Caudell	CCM Racing	Ford	Caudell Consulting & Marketing
10	Willie Mullins	Fast Track Racing	Ford	CW Metals, Crow Wing Recycling
11	Bryce Haugeberg	Fast Track Racing	Chevrolet	Haugeburg Farms, Magnum Contracting, Inc.
12	Dick Doheny	Fast Track Racing	Toyota	Evergreen Raceway
15	Jesse Love	Venturini Motorsports	Toyota	Mobil 1
17	Taylor Gray	David Gilliland Racing	Ford	Ford Performance
18	Ty Gibbs	Joe Gibbs Racing	Toyota	Joe Gibbs Racing
20	Corey Heim	Venturini Motorsports	Toyota	Craftsman
21	Daniel Dye	GMS Racing	Chevrolet	Solar Fit, Race to Stop Suicide
25	Gracie Trotter	Venturini Motorsports	Toyota	Calico Coatings
27	Alex Clubb	Richmond Clubb Motorsports	Ford	Richmond Clubb Motorsports
30	Adam Lemke	Rette Jones Racing	Ford	Slick Products, JRi Shocks
46	Thad Moffitt	David Gilliland Racing	Ford	Clean Harbors
48	Brad Smith	Brad Smith Motorsports	Chevrolet	Henshaw Automation
66	Ron Vandermeir Jr.	Vandermeir Racing	Toyota	Mac Rak Inc.
Official entry list

== Practice ==
=== First and final practice ===
The only one-hour practice session would take place on Saturday, July 10, at 3:30 PM CST. Ty Gibbs of Joe Gibbs Racing would set the fastest lap in the session, with a lap of 14.561 and an average speed of 92.713 miles per hour (149.207 km/h).

Pos.	#	Driver	Team	Make	Time	Speed
1	18	Ty Gibbs	Joe Gibbs Racing	Toyota	14.561	92.713
2	20	Corey Heim	Venturini Motorsports	Toyota	14.591	92.523
3	17	Taylor Gray	David Gilliland Racing	Ford	14.651	92.144
Full practice results

== Qualifying ==
Qualifying would take place on Saturday, July 10, at 5:30 PM CST. Drivers would each run two laps to set a best time. Ty Gibbs of Joe Gibbs Racing would win the pole, setting a lap of 14.469 and an average speed of 93.303 miles per hour (150.157 km/h).

=== Full qualifying results ===
Pos.	#	Driver	Team	Make	Time	Speed
1	18	Ty Gibbs	Joe Gibbs Racing	Toyota	14.469	93.303
2	25	Gracie Trotter	Venturini Motorsports	Toyota	14.524	92.950
3	17	Taylor Gray	David Gilliland Racing	Ford	14.569	92.663
4	20	Corey Heim	Venturini Motorsports	Toyota	14.578	92.605
5	21	Daniel Dye	GMS Racing	Chevrolet	14.590	92.529
6	46	Thad Moffitt	David Gilliland Racing	Ford	14.592	92.516
7	15	Jesse Love	Venturini Motorsports	Toyota	14.638	92.226
8	66	Ron Vandermeier Jr.	Vandermeir Racing	Toyota	14.822	91.081
9	30	Adam Lemke	Rette Jones Racing	Ford	14.828	91.044
10	2	Nick Sanchez	Rev Racing	Chevrolet	14.849	90.915
11	10	Willie Mullins	Fast Track Racing	Ford	14.887	90.683
12	11	Bryce Haugeberg	Fast Track Racing	Chevrolet	15.218	88.711
13	27	Alex Clubb	Richmond Clubb Motorsports	Ford	15.295	88.264
14	01	Owen Smith	Fast Track Racing	Ford	15.474	87.243
15	12	Dick Doheny	Fast Track Racing	Toyota	15.745	85.742
16	48	Brad Smith	Brad Smith Motorsports	Chevrolet	16.682	80.926
17	06	Wayne Peterson	Wayne Peterson Racing	Ford	—	—
Withdrew
WD	7	Eric Caudell	CCM Racing	Ford	—	—
Official qualifying results

== Race results ==
Fin	St	#	Driver	Team	Make	Laps	Led	Status	Pts
1	4	20	Corey Heim	Venturini Motorsports	Toyota	250	14	running	47
2	7	15	Jesse Love	Venturini Motorsports	Toyota	250	0	running	42
3	2	25	Gracie Trotter	Venturini Motorsports	Toyota	250	0	running	41
4	1	18	Ty Gibbs	Joe Gibbs Racing	Toyota	250	236	running	43
5	3	17	Taylor Gray	David Gilliland Racing	Ford	250	0	running	39
6	10	2	Nick Sanchez	Rev Racing	Chevrolet	250	0	running	38
7	5	21	Daniel Dye	GMS Racing	Chevrolet	250	0	running	37
8	11	10	Willie Mullins	Fast Track Racing	Ford	250	0	running	36
9	6	46	Thad Moffitt	David Gilliland Racing	Ford	249	0	running	35
10	9	30	Adam Lemke	Rette Jones Racing	Ford	249	0	running	34
11	8	66	Ron Vandermeier Jr.	Vandermeir Racing	Toyota	247	0	running	33
12	13	27	Alex Clubb	Richmond Clubb Motorsports	Ford	242	0	running	32
13	12	11	Bryce Haugeberg	Fast Track Racing	Chevrolet	229	0	transmission	31
14	16	48	Brad Smith	Brad Smith Motorsports	Chevrolet	54	0	transmission	30
15	15	12	Dick Doheny	Fast Track Racing	Toyota	8	0	vibration	29
16	14	01	Owen Smith	Fast Track Racing	Ford	6	0	clutch	28
17	17	06	Wayne Peterson	Wayne Peterson Racing	Ford	1	0	brakes	27
Withdrew
WD		7	Eric Caudell	CCM Racing	Ford				
Official race results

Previous race: 2021 General Tire #AnywhereIsPossible 200	ARCA Menards Series; 2021 season	Next race: 2021 Zinsser SmartCoat 200
