= Michael Harper (racing driver) =

American racing driver

- Born: March 11, 1979 (age 47); Decatur, Texas, U.S.

ARCA Menards Series career
- 1 race run over 1 year
- Best finish: 98th (2021)
- First race: 2021 General Tire 200 (Talladega)
| Wins | Top tens | Poles |
|---|---|---|
| 0 | 0 | 0 |
- Statistics up to date as of January 29, 2025.

Michael Harper (born March 11, 1979) is an American professional auto racing driver who has previously competed in the ARCA Menards Series. He has also competed in Monster Jam, driving the Carolina Crusher truck.

== Motorsports results ==
=== ARCA Menards Series ===
(key) (Bold – Pole position awarded by qualifying time. Italics – Pole position earned by points standings or practice time. * – Most laps led.)

ARCA Menards Series results
| Year | Team | No. | Make | 1 | 2 | 3 | 4 | 5 | 6 | 7 | 8 | 9 | 10 | 11 | 12 | 13 | 14 | 15 | 16 | 17 | 18 | 19 | 20 | AMSC | Pts | Ref |
|---|---|---|---|---|---|---|---|---|---|---|---|---|---|---|---|---|---|---|---|---|---|---|---|---|---|---|
| 2021 | Fast Track Racing | 01 | Ford | DAY | PHO | TAL; 16 | KAN | TOL | CLT | MOH | POC | ELK | BLN | IOW | WIN | GLN | MCH | ISF | MLW | DSF | BRI | SLM | KAN | 98th | 28 | |
