= John Ferrier (racing driver) =

American racing driver (born 1966)

- Born: January 5, 1966 (age 60); Middletown, New York, U.S.

ARCA Menards Series career
- 16 races run over 11 years
- Best finish: 52nd (2017)
- First race: 2009 Lucas Oil Slick Mist 200 (Daytona)
- Last race: 2021 General Tire 200 (Talladega)
Wins	Top tens	Poles
0	1	0
- Statistics up to date as of January 27, 2025.

John Ferrier (born January 5, 1966) is an American professional stock car racing driver and team owner who has previously competed in the ARCA Menards Series, having last driven the No. 44 Chevrolet for Ferrier McClure Racing.

Wangerin has also competed in series such as the DIRTcar Sportsman Series, the Super DIRTcar Big-Block Modified Series, the DIRTcar 358-Modified Series, and the Short Track Super Series.

== Motorsports results ==
=== ARCA Menards Series ===
(key) (Bold – Pole position awarded by qualifying time. Italics – Pole position earned by points standings or practice time. * – Most laps led.)

ARCA Menards Series results
Year	Team	No.	Make	1	2	3	4	5	6	7	8	9	10	11	12	13	14	15	16	17	18	19	20	21	AMSC	Pts	Ref
2008	Randy Baker Racing	81	Ford	DAY	SLM	IOW	KAN	CAR	KEN	TOL	POC	MCH	CAY	KEN	BLN	POC; DNQ	NSH	ISF	DSF	CHI	SLM	NJE	TAL	TOL	N/A	0	
2009	Randy Baker Racing	99	Ford	DAY; 16	SLM	CAR	TAL; 18	KEN	TOL	POC	MCH	MFD	IOW	KEN	BLN	POC; 17	ISF	CHI	TOL	DSF	NJE	SLM	KAN	CAR	67th	435	
2011	Andy Belmont Racing	14	Ford	DAY; 24	TAL	SLM	TOL	NJE	CHI	POC	MCH	WIN	BLN	IOW	IRP	POC	ISF	MAD	DSF	SLM	KAN	TOL			136th	110	
2012	Motorhead Racing Company	76	Chevy	DAY; DNQ	MOB	SLM	TAL; 31	TOL	ELK	POC	MCH	WIN	NJE	IOW	CHI	IRP	POC	BLN	ISF	MAD	SLM	DSF	KAN		127th	100	
2013	John Ferrier	8	Ford	DAY; DNQ	MOB	SLM																			78th	300	
2013	Kimmel Racing	69	Ford				TAL; 7	TOL	ELK																78th	300	
2013	Kimmel Racing	68	Ford							POC; 30	MCH	ROA	WIN	CHI	NJM	POC	BLN	ISF	MAD	DSF	IOW	SLM	KEN	KAN	78th	300	
2016	Invicta Motorsports	43	Chevy	DAY; 22	NSH	SLM	TAL	TOL	NJE	POC	MCH	MAD	WIN	IOW	IRP	POC	BLN	ISF	DSF	SLM	CHI	KEN	KAN		123rd	120	
2017	Ferrier Racing	16	Chevy	DAY; 18	NSH	SLM	TAL	TOL	ELK																52nd	360	
2017	Empire Racing	46	Ford							POC; 20	MCH	MAD	IOW	IRP	POC; 28	WIN	ISF	ROA	DSF	SLM	CHI	KEN	KAN		52nd	360	
2018	Empire Racing	46	Ford	DAY; 15	NSH	SLM	TAL	TOL	CLT	POC	MCH	MAD	GTW	CHI	IOW	ELK	POC	ISF	BLN	DSF	SLM	IRP	KAN		93rd	155	
2019	Empire Racing	44	Chevy	DAY; 34	FIF	SLM	TAL	NSH	TOL	CLT	POC	MCH	MAD	GTW	CHI	ELK	IOW	POC	ISF	DSF	SLM	IRP	KAN		84th	60	
2020	Fast Track Racing	01	Chevy	DAY; 29	PHO	TAL	POC	IRP	KEN	IOW	KAN	TOL	TOL	MCH	DAY	GTW	L44	TOL	BRI	WIN	MEM	ISF	KAN		89th	15	
2021	Ferrier McClure Racing	44	Chevy	DAY; 12	PHO	TAL; 28	KAN	TOL	CLT	MOH	POC	ELK	BLN	IOW	WIN	GLN	MCH	ISF	MLW	DSF	BRI	SLM	KAN		69th	48	
