= Adam Lemke =

American racing driver

- Born: June 21, 2002 (age 24); Hollister, California, U.S.

ARCA Menards Series career
- 1 race run over 1 year
- Best finish: 87th (2021)
- First race: 2021 Menards 250 (Elko)
Wins	Top tens	Poles
0	1	0
- Statistics up to date as of January 29, 2025.

Adam Lemke (born June 21, 2002) is an American former professional stock car racing driver who has previously competed in the ARCA Menards Series and the CARS Late Model Stock Tour. He is a former development driver for Chevrolet and JR Motorsports.

Lemke has also competed in the USAC Speed2 Western US Midget Series and the asphalt and dirt divisions, the Western Midget Racing Series, and the NASCAR Advance Auto Parts Weekly Series.

== Motorsports results ==
=== ARCA Menards Series ===
(key) (Bold – Pole position awarded by qualifying time. Italics – Pole position earned by points standings or practice time. * – Most laps led.)

ARCA Menards Series results
Year	Team	No.	Make	1	2	3	4	5	6	7	8	9	10	11	12	13	14	15	16	17	18	19	20	AMSC	Pts	Ref
2021	Rette Jones Racing	30	Ford	DAY	PHO	TAL	KAN	TOL	CLT	MOH	POC	ELK; 10	BLN	IOW	WIN	GLN	MCH	ISF	MLW	DSF	BRI	SLM	KAN	87th	34	

=== CARS Late Model Stock Car Tour ===
(key) (Bold – Pole position awarded by qualifying time. Italics – Pole position earned by points standings or practice time. * – Most laps led. ** – All laps led.)

CARS Late Model Stock Car Tour results
Year	Team	No.	Make	1	2	3	4	5	6	7	8	9	10	11	CLMSCTC	Pts	Ref
2019	JR Motorsports	98	Chevy	SNM; 29	HCY; 19	ROU; 3	ACE; 5	MMS; 19	LGY; 4	DOM; 11	CCS	HCY; 13	ROU; 13	SBO	11th	182	
2020	Adam Lemke	41	Ford	SNM	ACE; 19										35th	31	
2020	Lee McCall	41	Ford			HCY; 16	HCY	DOM	FCS	LGY	CCS	FLO	GRE		35th	31	
