= Tim Richmond (racing driver, born 1998) =

American racing driver

Timothy Richmond
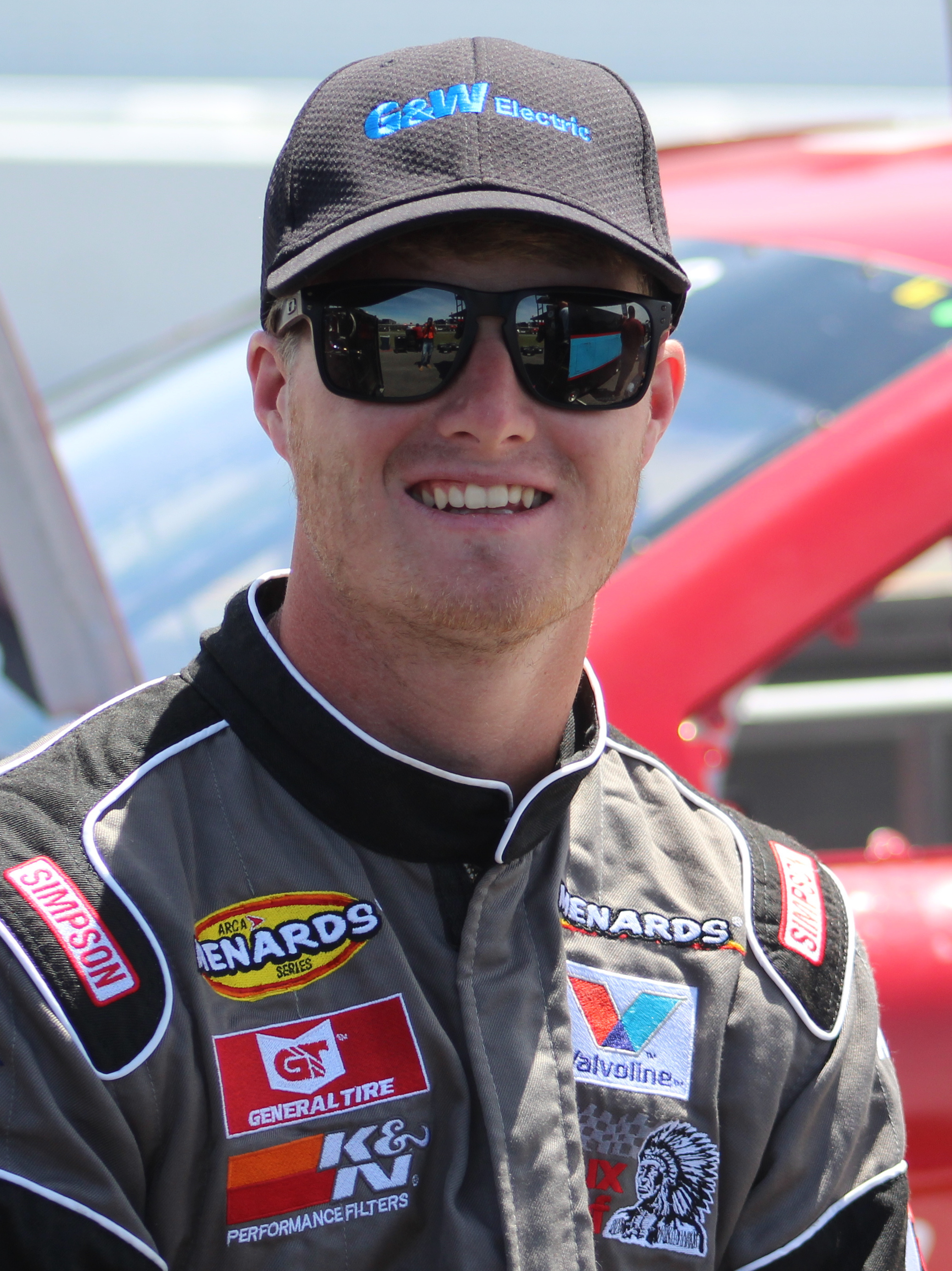
- Richmond at Pocono Raceway in 2021
- Born: Timothy Richmond; September 12, 1998 (age 28); Ottawa, Illinois, U.S.

ARCA Menards Series career
- 63 races run over 8 years
- Best finish: 8th (2019)
- First race: 2019 ARCA Pensacola 200 (Pensacola)
- Last race: 2026 Ashley Furniture 150 (Chicagoland)
Wins	Top tens	Poles
0	2	0

ARCA Menards Series East career
- 7 races run over 5 years
- Best finish: 40th (2020)
- First race: 2020 Royal Truck & Trailer 200 (Toledo)
- Last race: 2025 Bush's Beans 200 (Bristol)
Wins	Top tens	Poles
0	0	0

ARCA Menards Series West career
- 1 race run over 1 year
- Best finish: 52nd (2021)
- First race: 2021 General Tire 150 (Phoenix)
Wins	Top tens	Poles
0	0	0
- Statistics up to date as of July 3, 2026.

Timothy Richmond (born September 12, 1998) is an American professional stock car racing driver. He last competed part-time in the ARCA Menards Series, driving the No. 27 car for his team, Richmond Motorsports.

== Racing career ==
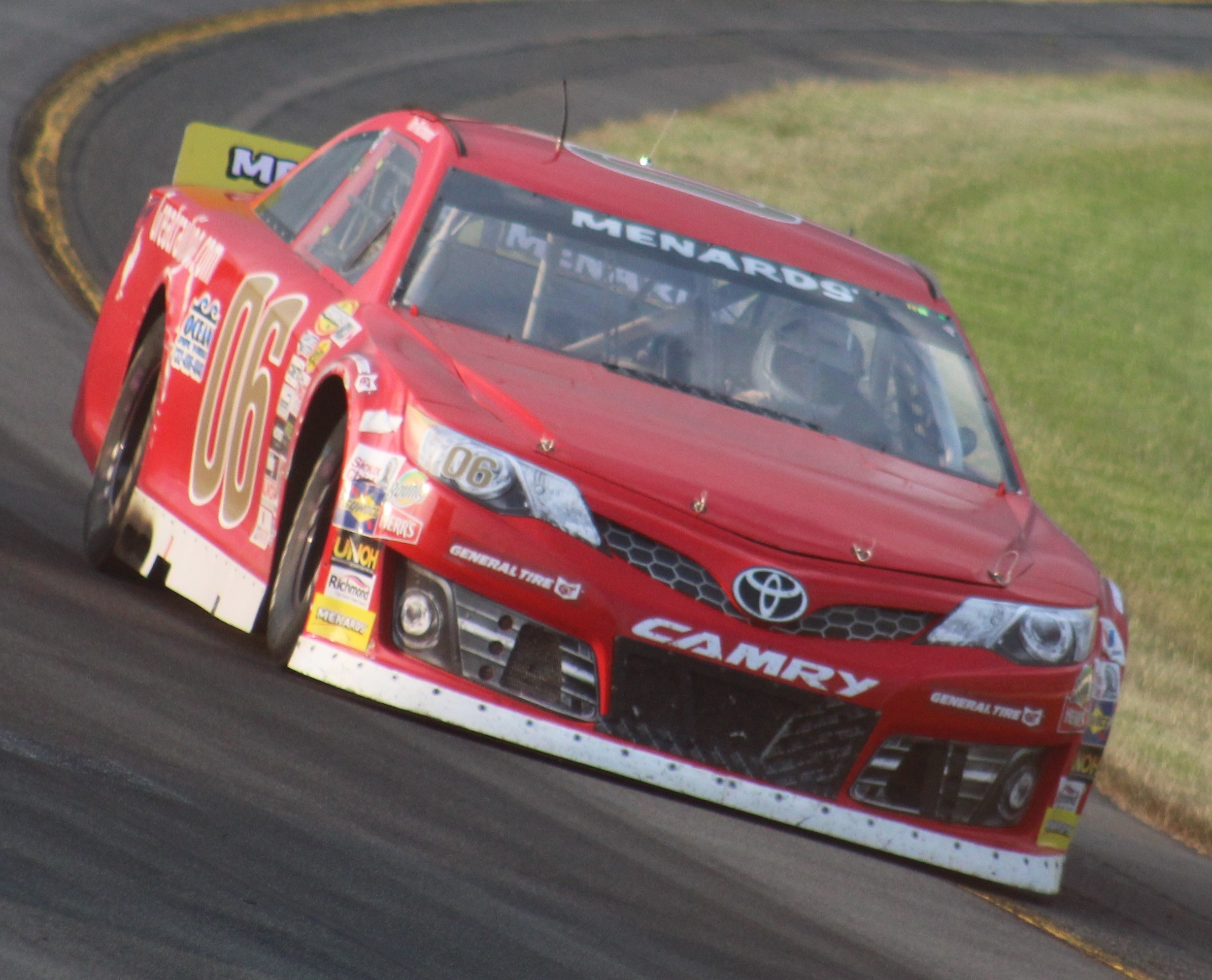
Richmond's No. 06 at Pocono in June 2019. This was one of the races where he drove a newer composite car.

Prior to driving in the ARCA Menards Series, Richmond competed in a road racing series.

Richmond made his debut in ARCA and stock car racing as a whole at Five Flags in 2019, driving for Wayne Peterson in his team's No. 06 car. Although he did finish 25 laps down in fourteenth, he left the team impressed, as he was able to finish the race, something the team had not been able to accomplish much with other drivers. Being an underfunded team, WPR was still competing with steel-bodied cars, which ARCA was starting to shift away from. So, Richmond raced against newer cars and made it to the finish of the race in an older car. After that, the team quickly signed him on for more races, which later turned out to be almost a full-season effort. He also joined the battle for rookie of the year in 2019. Richmond would go on to finish eighth in points that season, although largely because the series had few full-time drivers that year. It was the highest points finish and first one in the top-ten for one of Wayne Peterson's drivers, topping teammate Con Nicolopoulos' two consecutive eleventh place finishes in the standings the previous two years when he ran nearly the full season both years.

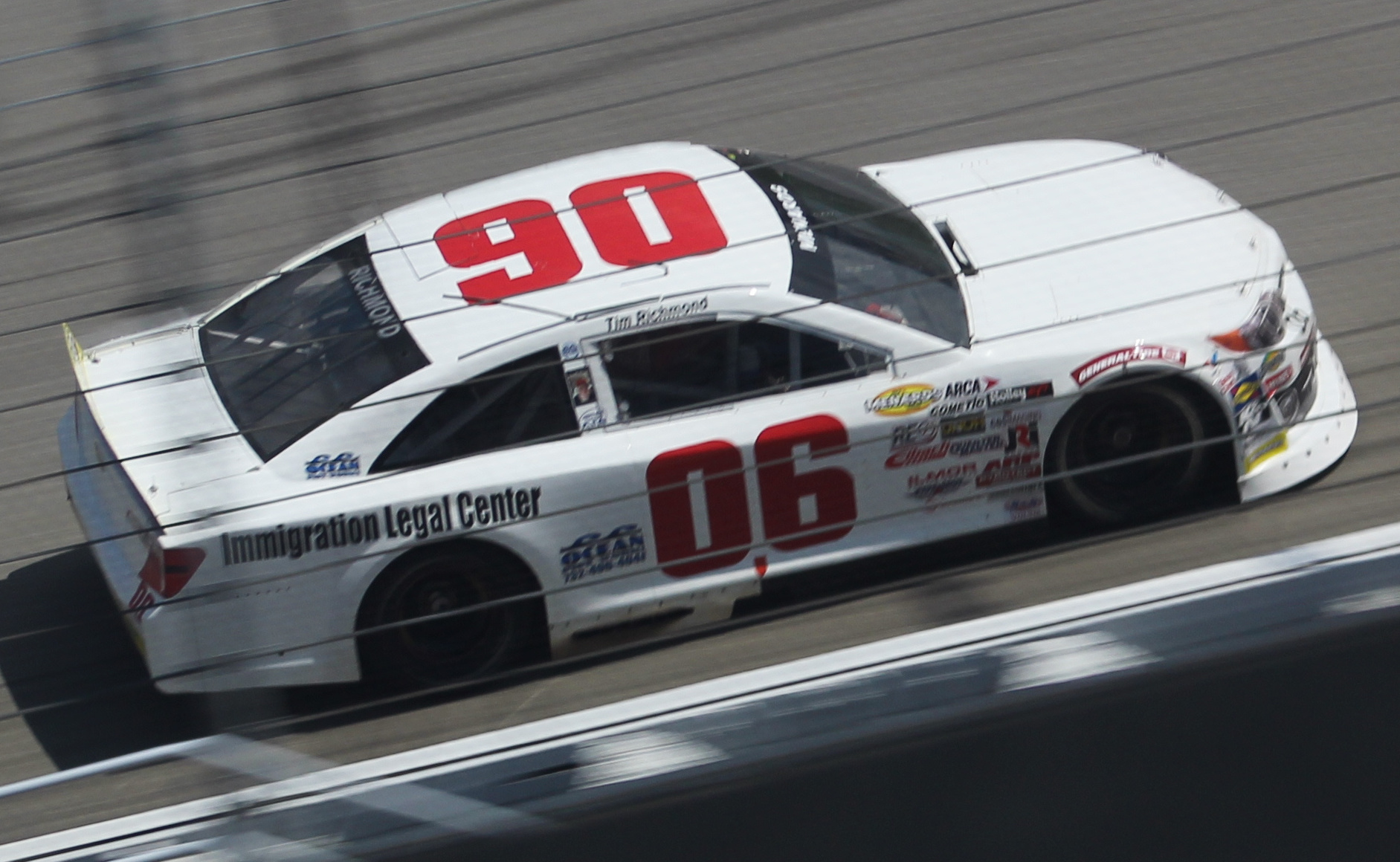
Richmond's No. 06 car at Michigan International Speedway in 2020

It was revealed in an article on the ARCA website on December 23, 2019, that Richmond would return to the Peterson team and run the full season in 2020.

Richmond and Peterson started the 2020 season off with an eighteenth place finish at the season-opener at Daytona, and then a 23rd place DNF at Phoenix.

In 2021, Richmond left Peterson's team and started his team with fellow ARCA driver Alex Clubb, Richmond Clubb Motorsports. The team competed full-time in the series with both driver/co-owners sharing the car No. 27. The team also fielded second car at the Milwaukee Mile, meaning both drivers would be in that race. The cars and equipment that the Richmond family owned were also taken from WPR to RCM. The crew chief of the No. 06, Brad Frye, also moved over to the new team with Richmond. Richmond missed the rest of the reason after he was injured in a crash at Michigan when Drew Dollar hit him.

For the 2022 season, Richmond drove solely for Richmond Motorsports after Alex Clubb returned to his own team, Clubb Racing Inc.

== Personal life ==
Richmond and his family live in Ottawa, Illinois. The Richmond family helped Peterson's team and crew improve in the 2019 season, particularly having fast enough speed to qualify for races and buying newer equipment such as the new composite cars (which would eventually be required in ARCA). Tim is not related to former NASCAR Cup Series driver Tim Richmond.

== Motorsports career results ==
=== Stock car career summary ===
Season	Series	Team	Races	Wins	Top 5	Top 10	Points	Position
2019	ARCA Menards Series	Wayne Peterson Racing	17	0	0	0	3170	8th
2020	ARCA Menards Series East	Wayne Peterson Racing	1	0	0	0	31	40th
2020	ARCA Menards Series	Wayne Peterson Racing	14	0	0	1	331	12th
2021	ARCA Menards Series West	Richmond Clubb Motorsports	1	0	0	0	31	52nd
2021	ARCA Menards Series East	Richmond Clubb Motorsports	1	0	0	0	31	44th
2021	ARCA Menards Series	Richmond Clubb Motorsports	9	0	0	0	253	14th
2022	ARCA Menards Series East	Richmond Motorsports	2	0	0	0	48	36th
2022	ARCA Menards Series	Richmond Motorsports	5	0	0	0	131	26th
2023	ARCA Menards Series	Richmond Motorsports	4	0	0	0	74	52nd
2024	ARCA Menards Series East	Richmond Motorsports	1	0	0	0	28	52nd
2024	ARCA Menards Series	Richmond Motorsports	7	0	1	1	194	23rd
2025	ARCA Menards Series East	Richmond Motorsports	2	0	0	0	53	41st
2025	ARCA Menards Series	Richmond Motorsports	5	0	0	0	113	39th
2026	ARCA Menards Series	Richmond Motorsports	3	0	0	0	66	64th

=== ARCA Menards Series ===
(key) (Bold – Pole position awarded by qualifying time. Italics – Pole position earned by points standings or practice time. * – Most laps led.)

ARCA Menards Series results
Year	Team	No.	Make	1	2	3	4	5	6	7	8	9	10	11	12	13	14	15	16	17	18	19	20	AMSC	Pts	Ref
2019	Wayne Peterson Racing	06	Dodge	DAY	FIF; 14	SLM; 14	TAL	NSH; 13	TOL; 11	CLT			MAD; 14						ISF; 13	DSF; 14	SLM; 15			8th	3170	
2019	Wayne Peterson Racing	06	Toyota								POC; 14	MCH; 15			CHI; 12		IOW; 16	POC; 15				IRP; 17	KAN; 17	8th	3170	
2019	Wayne Peterson Racing	06	Chevy											GTW; 18										8th	3170	
2019	Wayne Peterson Racing	06	Ford													ELK; 16								8th	3170	
2020	Wayne Peterson Racing	06	Toyota	DAY; 18	PHO; 23	TAL; 17	POC	IRP; 20	KEN	IOW; 13	KAN	TOL; 9	TOL; 12	MCH; 11	DAY	GTW; 16	L44; 11	TOL; 13	BRI	WIN	MEM; 13	ISF; 11	KAN; 11	12th	331	
2021	Richmond Clubb Motorsports	27	Toyota	DAY; 19		TAL; 24				MOH; 13						GLN; 17								14th	253	
2021	Richmond Clubb Motorsports	27	Chevy		PHO; 13		KAN	TOL	CLT; 13		POC; 14	ELK	BLN	IOW; 13	WIN		MCH; 17	ISF	MLW	DSF	BRI	SLM	KAN	14th	253	
2022	Richmond Motorsports	27	Toyota	DAY; 18	PHO	TAL; 29	KAN																	26th	131	
2022	Richmond Motorsports	27	Chevy					CLT; 26	IOW; 23	BLN	ELK	MOH	POC	IRP	MCH	GLN	ISF							26th	131	
2022	Richmond Motorsports	06	Chevy															MLW; 17	DSF	KAN	BRI	SLM; QL^{†}	TOL	26th	131	
2023	Richmond Motorsports	27	Toyota	DAY; 36	PHO	TAL; 25	KAN	CLT	BLN	ELK														52nd	74	
2023	Richmond Motorsports	06	Toyota								MOH; 19	IOW	POC	MCH	IRP	GLN; 22	ISF	MLW	DSF	KAN	BRI	SLM	TOL	52nd	74	
2024	Richmond Motorsports	27	Toyota	DAY; 5	PHO	TAL; 16	DOV	KAN	CLT; 17	IOW	MOH; 12	BLN	IRP	SLM	ELK	MCH; 22	ISF	MLW	DSF	GLN; 26	BRI; 16	KAN	TOL	23rd	194	
2025	Richmond Motorsports	27	Toyota	DAY; 17	PHO	TAL; 33	KAN	CLT; 22	MCH	BLN	ELK	LRP	DOV	IRP	IOW; 19	GLN	ISF	MAD	DSF	BRI; 16	SLM	KAN	TOL	39th	113	
2026	Richmond Motorsports	27	Toyota	DAY; 23	PHO	KAN	TAL; 32	GLN	TOL	MCH	POC	BER	ELK	CHI; 11	LRP	IRP	IOW	ISF	MAD	DSF	SLM	BRI	KAN	64th	66	
^{†} – Qualified but replaced by Nate Moeller

==== ARCA Menards Series East ====
ARCA Menards Series East results
Year	Team	No.	Make	1	2	3	4	5	6	7	8	AMSEC	Pts	Ref
2020	Wayne Peterson Racing	06	Toyota	NSM	TOL	DOV	TOL; 13	BRI	FIF			40th	31	
2021	Richmond Clubb Motorsports	27	Chevy	NSM	FIF	NSV	DOV	SNM	IOW; 13	MLW	BRI	44th	31	
2022	Richmond Motorsports	27	Chevy	NSM	FIF	DOV	NSV	IOW; 23				36th	48	
2022	Richmond Motorsports	06	Chevy						MLW; 17	BRI		36th	48	
2024	Richmond Motorsports	27	Toyota	FIF	DOV	NSV	FRS	IOW	IRP	MLW	BRI; 16	52nd	28	
2025	Richmond Motorsports	27	Toyota	FIF	CAR	NSV	FRS	DOV	IRP	IOW; 19	BRI; 16	41st	53	

==== ARCA Menards Series West ====
ARCA Menards Series West results
Year	Team	No.	Make	1	2	3	4	5	6	7	8	9	AMSWC	Pts	Ref
2021	Richmond Clubb Motorsports	27	Chevy	PHO; 13	SON	IRW	CNS	IRW	PIR	LVS	AAS	PHO	52nd	31	

^{*} Season still in progress
^{1} Ineligible for series points
