= 2021 ARCA Menards Series =

69th season of the ARCA Menards Series

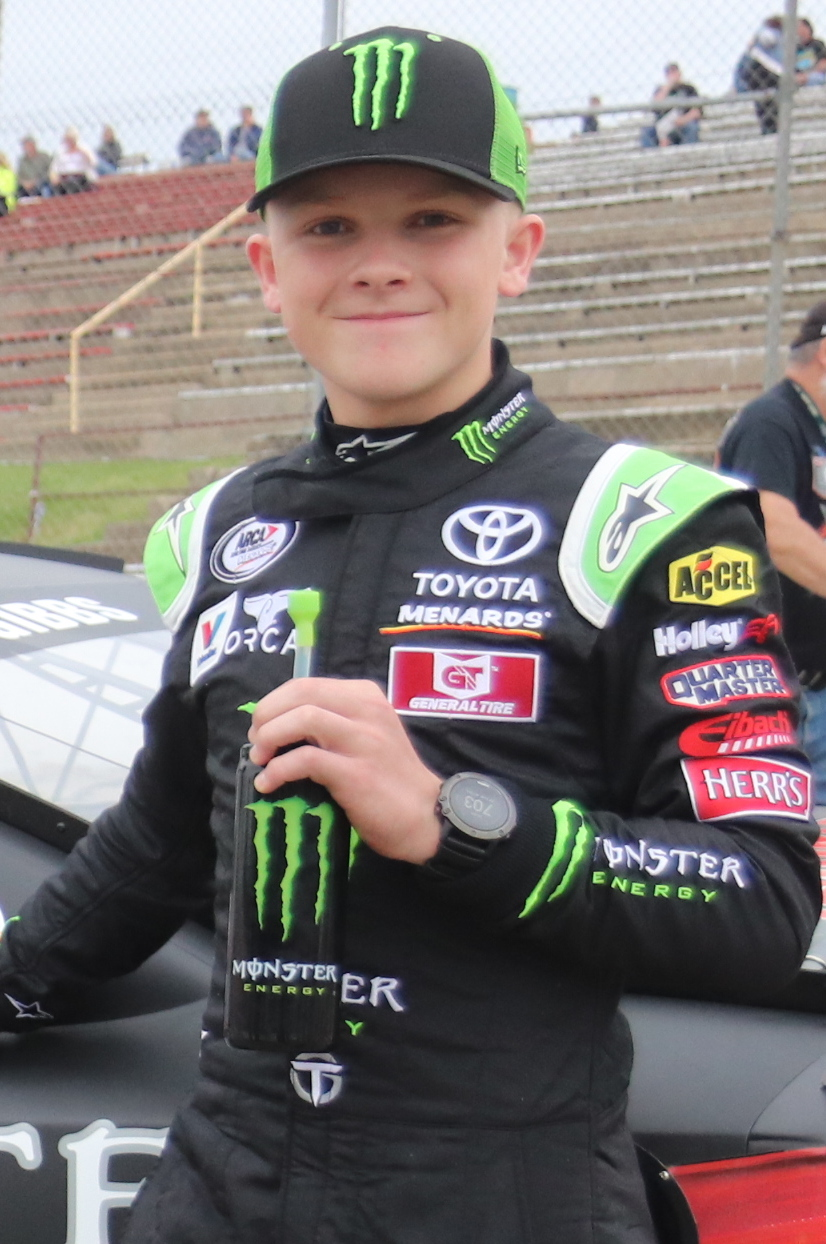
Ty Gibbs, the 2021 ARCA Menards Series champion

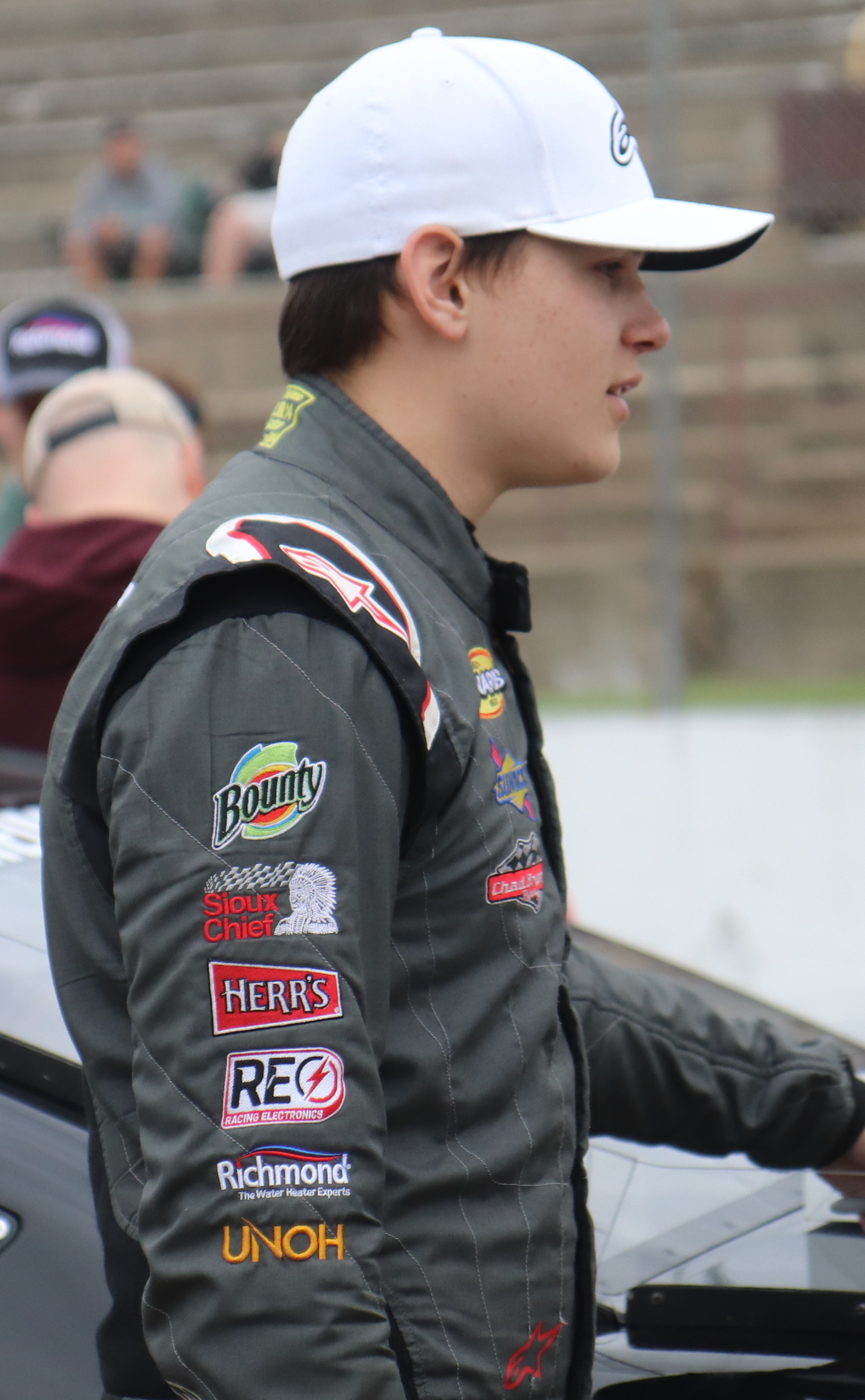
Corey Heim finished second behind Gibbs in the championship by 37 points.

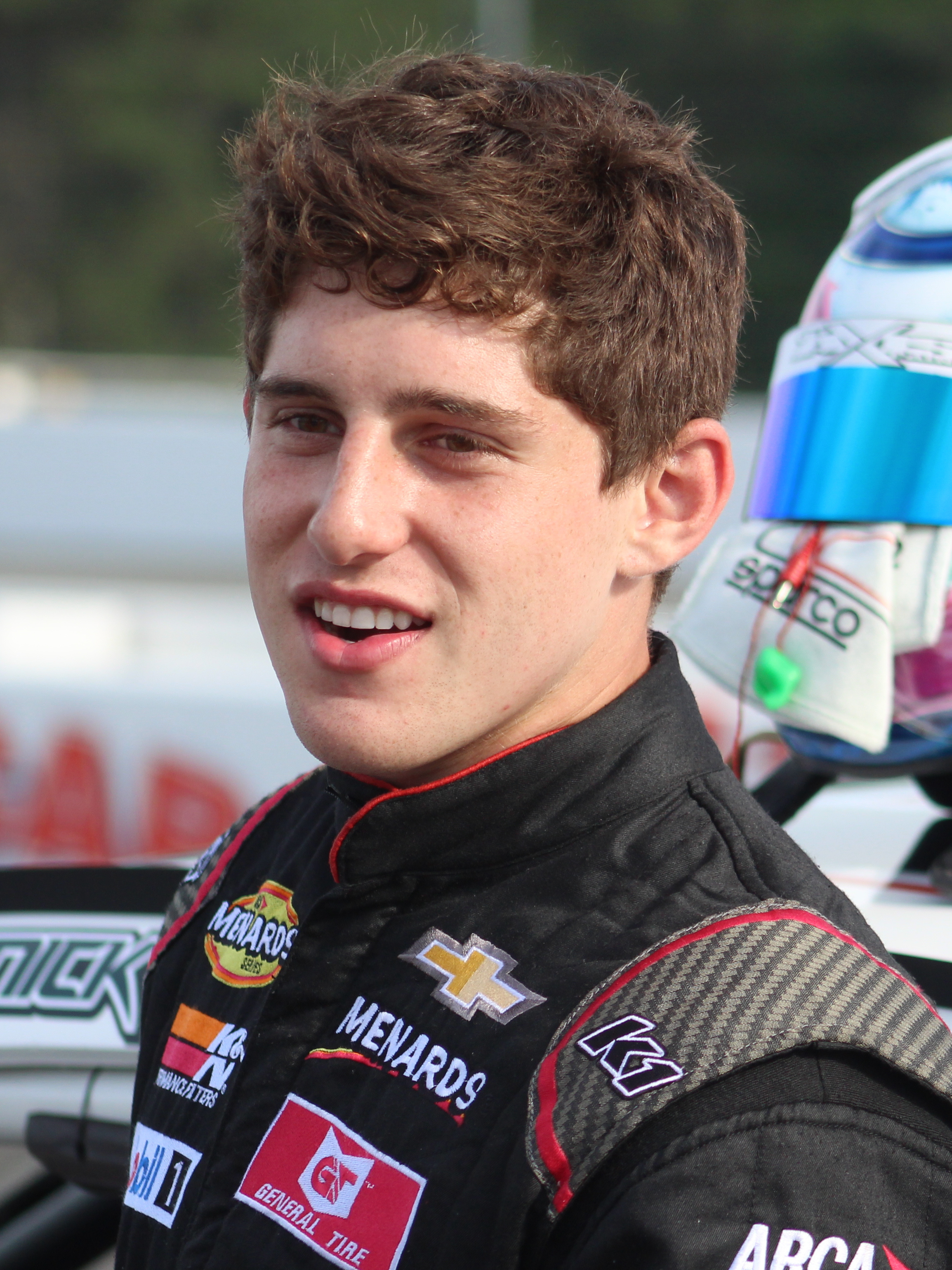
Nick Sanchez finished third in the championship despite not competing in two races.

The 2021 ARCA Menards Series season was the 69th season of the ARCA Menards Series, a stock car racing series sanctioned by NASCAR in the United States. The season began at Daytona International Speedway with the Lucas Oil 200 on February 13 and ended with the Reese's 150 at Kansas Speedway on October 23. Ty Gibbs was crowned the series champion, having won ten times and finished in the top four in 19 of 20 races.

This ARCA season also featured a historic first, as Fox pit reporter Jamie Little became the first woman to serve as a TV play-by-play announcer in motorsports history.

== Teams and drivers ==
Note: If a driver is listed as their own crew chief for a particular race, that means that their entry in that race was a start and park.

=== Complete schedule ===
Manufacturer	Team	No.	Driver	Crew chief
Chevrolet	Brad Smith Motorsports	48	Owen Smith 1 (Note: Entry was fielded in a collaboration with Fast Track Racing.)	Brad Smith
Chevrolet	Brad Smith Motorsports	48	Brad Smith 18	Kevin Schwarze 1 Jeff Smith 12; Arlis Basham 1 Terry Strange 2 Leo Kryger 3
Chevrolet	Brad Smith Motorsports	48	Wayne Peterson 1 (Note: At Kansas in October (Race 20), Brad Smith, initially entered in the No. 48, and Wayne Peterson, initially entered in the No. 06, switched cars after Smith's No. 48 had an issue in practice. Since Peterson intended on starting and parking in the race, he drove the No. 48 and Smith attempted to run the full race in the No. 06.)	Kevin Schwarze 1 Jeff Smith 12; Arlis Basham 1 Terry Strange 2 Leo Kryger 3
Ford	David Gilliland Racing	46	Thad Moffitt 16	Derek Smith 18; Chad Johnston 2
Ford	David Gilliland Racing	46	Taylor Gray 2	Derek Smith 18; Chad Johnston 2
Ford	David Gilliland Racing	46	J. P. Bergeron 2	Derek Smith 18; Chad Johnston 2
Toyota	Joe Gibbs Racing	18	Ty Gibbs	Mark McFarland
Toyota	Venturini Motorsports	15	Drew Dollar 12	Billy Venturini 13; Kevin Reed 7
Toyota	Venturini Motorsports	15	Jesse Love 7	Billy Venturini 13; Kevin Reed 7
Toyota	Venturini Motorsports	15	Parker Chase 1	Billy Venturini 13; Kevin Reed 7
Toyota	Venturini Motorsports	20	Corey Heim	Shannon Rursch
Toyota	Venturini Motorsports	25	Gracie Trotter 8	Kevin Reed 14; Billy Venturini 5 Kevin Reed Jr. 1
Toyota	Venturini Motorsports	25	Derek Griffith 1	Kevin Reed 14; Billy Venturini 5 Kevin Reed Jr. 1
Toyota	Venturini Motorsports	25	Parker Chase 2	Kevin Reed 14; Billy Venturini 5 Kevin Reed Jr. 1
Toyota	Venturini Motorsports	25	Brandon Jones 2	Kevin Reed 14; Billy Venturini 5 Kevin Reed Jr. 1
Toyota	Venturini Motorsports	25	Chandler Smith 1	Kevin Reed 14; Billy Venturini 5 Kevin Reed Jr. 1
Toyota	Venturini Motorsports	25	Jesse Love 3	Kevin Reed 14; Billy Venturini 5 Kevin Reed Jr. 1
Toyota	Venturini Motorsports	25	Toni Breidinger 3	Kevin Reed 14; Billy Venturini 5 Kevin Reed Jr. 1
Chevrolet	Rev Racing	2	Nick Sanchez (R) 18	Steve Plattenberger
Toyota	Rette Jones Racing with Austin Theriault (Note: Entries were fielded by Rette Jones Racing with Austin Theriault using Rev Racing's owner points.)	2	Landen Lewis 2	Mark Rette
Toyota 5 Chevrolet 6 Ford 9	Fast Track Racing	01	Chuck Hiers 1	David Ifft 1 Kevin Cram 1 Chris VanScoy 1 Owen Smith 6 Steven Barton 1 Mike Sroufe 3 Trey Galgon 3 Tony Cosentino 2 Dick Doheny 2
Toyota 5 Chevrolet 6 Ford 9	Fast Track Racing	01	Bryce Haugeberg 1	David Ifft 1 Kevin Cram 1 Chris VanScoy 1 Owen Smith 6 Steven Barton 1 Mike Sroufe 3 Trey Galgon 3 Tony Cosentino 2 Dick Doheny 2
Toyota 5 Chevrolet 6 Ford 9	Fast Track Racing	01	Michael Harper 1	David Ifft 1 Kevin Cram 1 Chris VanScoy 1 Owen Smith 6 Steven Barton 1 Mike Sroufe 3 Trey Galgon 3 Tony Cosentino 2 Dick Doheny 2
Toyota 5 Chevrolet 6 Ford 9	Fast Track Racing	01	Owen Smith 7	David Ifft 1 Kevin Cram 1 Chris VanScoy 1 Owen Smith 6 Steven Barton 1 Mike Sroufe 3 Trey Galgon 3 Tony Cosentino 2 Dick Doheny 2
Toyota 5 Chevrolet 6 Ford 9	Fast Track Racing	01	Stephanie Moyer 2	David Ifft 1 Kevin Cram 1 Chris VanScoy 1 Owen Smith 6 Steven Barton 1 Mike Sroufe 3 Trey Galgon 3 Tony Cosentino 2 Dick Doheny 2
Toyota 5 Chevrolet 6 Ford 9	Fast Track Racing	01	Mike Basham 1	David Ifft 1 Kevin Cram 1 Chris VanScoy 1 Owen Smith 6 Steven Barton 1 Mike Sroufe 3 Trey Galgon 3 Tony Cosentino 2 Dick Doheny 2
Toyota 5 Chevrolet 6 Ford 9	Fast Track Racing	01	D. L. Wilson 2	David Ifft 1 Kevin Cram 1 Chris VanScoy 1 Owen Smith 6 Steven Barton 1 Mike Sroufe 3 Trey Galgon 3 Tony Cosentino 2 Dick Doheny 2
Toyota 5 Chevrolet 6 Ford 9	Fast Track Racing	01	Tony Cosentino 1	David Ifft 1 Kevin Cram 1 Chris VanScoy 1 Owen Smith 6 Steven Barton 1 Mike Sroufe 3 Trey Galgon 3 Tony Cosentino 2 Dick Doheny 2
Toyota 5 Chevrolet 6 Ford 9	Fast Track Racing	01	Jason Miles 1	David Ifft 1 Kevin Cram 1 Chris VanScoy 1 Owen Smith 6 Steven Barton 1 Mike Sroufe 3 Trey Galgon 3 Tony Cosentino 2 Dick Doheny 2
Toyota 5 Chevrolet 6 Ford 9	Fast Track Racing	01	Tim Monroe 1	David Ifft 1 Kevin Cram 1 Chris VanScoy 1 Owen Smith 6 Steven Barton 1 Mike Sroufe 3 Trey Galgon 3 Tony Cosentino 2 Dick Doheny 2
Toyota 5 Chevrolet 6 Ford 9	Fast Track Racing	01	Richard Garvie 1	David Ifft 1 Kevin Cram 1 Chris VanScoy 1 Owen Smith 6 Steven Barton 1 Mike Sroufe 3 Trey Galgon 3 Tony Cosentino 2 Dick Doheny 2
Toyota 5 Chevrolet 6 Ford 9	Fast Track Racing	01	Willie Mullins 1 (Note: Entry was fielded in a collaboration with Mullins Racing.)	David Ifft 1 Kevin Cram 1 Chris VanScoy 1 Owen Smith 6 Steven Barton 1 Mike Sroufe 3 Trey Galgon 3 Tony Cosentino 2 Dick Doheny 2
Ford 3 Chevrolet 5 Toyota 12	Fast Track Racing	10	Jason White 1	Mike Sroufe 11; Jeff McClure 2 Trey Galgon 1 Dick Doheny 4 Chris VanScoy 1 David Ifft 1 Steven Barton 1
Ford 3 Chevrolet 5 Toyota 12	Fast Track Racing	10	Mark Lowrey 1	Mike Sroufe 11; Jeff McClure 2 Trey Galgon 1 Dick Doheny 4 Chris VanScoy 1 David Ifft 1 Steven Barton 1
Ford 3 Chevrolet 5 Toyota 12	Fast Track Racing	10	Ed Pompa 3	Mike Sroufe 11; Jeff McClure 2 Trey Galgon 1 Dick Doheny 4 Chris VanScoy 1 David Ifft 1 Steven Barton 1
Ford 3 Chevrolet 5 Toyota 12	Fast Track Racing	10	Jason Miles 2	Mike Sroufe 11; Jeff McClure 2 Trey Galgon 1 Dick Doheny 4 Chris VanScoy 1 David Ifft 1 Steven Barton 1
Ford 3 Chevrolet 5 Toyota 12	Fast Track Racing	10	Dick Doheny 1	Mike Sroufe 11; Jeff McClure 2 Trey Galgon 1 Dick Doheny 4 Chris VanScoy 1 David Ifft 1 Steven Barton 1
Ford 3 Chevrolet 5 Toyota 12	Fast Track Racing	10	Arnout Kok 4	Mike Sroufe 11; Jeff McClure 2 Trey Galgon 1 Dick Doheny 4 Chris VanScoy 1 David Ifft 1 Steven Barton 1
Ford 3 Chevrolet 5 Toyota 12	Fast Track Racing	10	Willie Mullins 1	Mike Sroufe 11; Jeff McClure 2 Trey Galgon 1 Dick Doheny 4 Chris VanScoy 1 David Ifft 1 Steven Barton 1
Ford 3 Chevrolet 5 Toyota 12	Fast Track Racing	10	Owen Smith 1	Mike Sroufe 11; Jeff McClure 2 Trey Galgon 1 Dick Doheny 4 Chris VanScoy 1 David Ifft 1 Steven Barton 1
Ford 3 Chevrolet 5 Toyota 12	Fast Track Racing	10	D. L. Wilson 1	Mike Sroufe 11; Jeff McClure 2 Trey Galgon 1 Dick Doheny 4 Chris VanScoy 1 David Ifft 1 Steven Barton 1
Ford 3 Chevrolet 5 Toyota 12	Fast Track Racing	10	Brandon Varney 1	Mike Sroufe 11; Jeff McClure 2 Trey Galgon 1 Dick Doheny 4 Chris VanScoy 1 David Ifft 1 Steven Barton 1
Ford 3 Chevrolet 5 Toyota 12	Fast Track Racing	10	Morgen Baird 1	Mike Sroufe 11; Jeff McClure 2 Trey Galgon 1 Dick Doheny 4 Chris VanScoy 1 David Ifft 1 Steven Barton 1
Ford 3 Chevrolet 5 Toyota 12	Fast Track Racing	10	Tim Monroe 1	Mike Sroufe 11; Jeff McClure 2 Trey Galgon 1 Dick Doheny 4 Chris VanScoy 1 David Ifft 1 Steven Barton 1
Ford 3 Chevrolet 5 Toyota 12	Fast Track Racing	10	Ken Schrader 1	Mike Sroufe 11; Jeff McClure 2 Trey Galgon 1 Dick Doheny 4 Chris VanScoy 1 David Ifft 1 Steven Barton 1
Ford 3 Chevrolet 5 Toyota 12	Fast Track Racing	10	Jade Buford 1	Mike Sroufe 11; Jeff McClure 2 Trey Galgon 1 Dick Doheny 4 Chris VanScoy 1 David Ifft 1 Steven Barton 1
Ford 9 Toyota 9 Chevrolet 2	Fast Track Racing	11	Richard Garvie 3	Steven Barton 7 Mike Sroufe 3 Trey Galgon 1 Dick Doheny 1 Jeff McClure 6 Tony Cosentino 1 Owen Smith 1
Ford 9 Toyota 9 Chevrolet 2	Fast Track Racing	11	Dick Doheny 1	Steven Barton 7 Mike Sroufe 3 Trey Galgon 1 Dick Doheny 1 Jeff McClure 6 Tony Cosentino 1 Owen Smith 1
Ford 9 Toyota 9 Chevrolet 2	Fast Track Racing	11	Tony Cosentino 5	Steven Barton 7 Mike Sroufe 3 Trey Galgon 1 Dick Doheny 1 Jeff McClure 6 Tony Cosentino 1 Owen Smith 1
Ford 9 Toyota 9 Chevrolet 2	Fast Track Racing	11	Jade Buford 1	Steven Barton 7 Mike Sroufe 3 Trey Galgon 1 Dick Doheny 1 Jeff McClure 6 Tony Cosentino 1 Owen Smith 1
Ford 9 Toyota 9 Chevrolet 2	Fast Track Racing	11	Bryce Haugeberg 2	Steven Barton 7 Mike Sroufe 3 Trey Galgon 1 Dick Doheny 1 Jeff McClure 6 Tony Cosentino 1 Owen Smith 1
Ford 9 Toyota 9 Chevrolet 2	Fast Track Racing	11	Mason Mingus 3	Steven Barton 7 Mike Sroufe 3 Trey Galgon 1 Dick Doheny 1 Jeff McClure 6 Tony Cosentino 1 Owen Smith 1
Ford 9 Toyota 9 Chevrolet 2	Fast Track Racing	11	Ed Pompa 1	Steven Barton 7 Mike Sroufe 3 Trey Galgon 1 Dick Doheny 1 Jeff McClure 6 Tony Cosentino 1 Owen Smith 1
Ford 9 Toyota 9 Chevrolet 2	Fast Track Racing	11	Brandon Varney 1	Steven Barton 7 Mike Sroufe 3 Trey Galgon 1 Dick Doheny 1 Jeff McClure 6 Tony Cosentino 1 Owen Smith 1
Ford 9 Toyota 9 Chevrolet 2	Fast Track Racing	11	Mike Goudie 1	Steven Barton 7 Mike Sroufe 3 Trey Galgon 1 Dick Doheny 1 Jeff McClure 6 Tony Cosentino 1 Owen Smith 1
Ford 9 Toyota 9 Chevrolet 2	Fast Track Racing	11	Owen Smith 1	Steven Barton 7 Mike Sroufe 3 Trey Galgon 1 Dick Doheny 1 Jeff McClure 6 Tony Cosentino 1 Owen Smith 1
Ford 9 Toyota 9 Chevrolet 2	Fast Track Racing	11	Ron Vandermeir Jr. 1 (Note: Entry was fielded in a collaboration with Vanco Racing.)	Steven Barton 7 Mike Sroufe 3 Trey Galgon 1 Dick Doheny 1 Jeff McClure 6 Tony Cosentino 1 Owen Smith 1
Toyota 16 Chevrolet 4	Fast Track Racing	12	D. L. Wilson 10	Dick Doheny 13; Mike Sroufe 2 Jeff McClure 1 Tony Cosentino 2 Steven Barton 2
Toyota 16 Chevrolet 4	Fast Track Racing	12	Stanton Barrett 1	Dick Doheny 13; Mike Sroufe 2 Jeff McClure 1 Tony Cosentino 2 Steven Barton 2
Toyota 16 Chevrolet 4	Fast Track Racing	12	Nick Igdalsky 1	Dick Doheny 13; Mike Sroufe 2 Jeff McClure 1 Tony Cosentino 2 Steven Barton 2
Toyota 16 Chevrolet 4	Fast Track Racing	12	Dick Doheny 1	Dick Doheny 13; Mike Sroufe 2 Jeff McClure 1 Tony Cosentino 2 Steven Barton 2
Toyota 16 Chevrolet 4	Fast Track Racing	12	Tony Cosentino 4	Dick Doheny 13; Mike Sroufe 2 Jeff McClure 1 Tony Cosentino 2 Steven Barton 2
Toyota 16 Chevrolet 4	Fast Track Racing	12	Stephanie Moyer 1	Dick Doheny 13; Mike Sroufe 2 Jeff McClure 1 Tony Cosentino 2 Steven Barton 2
Toyota 16 Chevrolet 4	Fast Track Racing	12	Ken Schrader 1	Dick Doheny 13; Mike Sroufe 2 Jeff McClure 1 Tony Cosentino 2 Steven Barton 2
Toyota 8 Chevrolet 5 Ford 7	Richmond Clubb Motorsports	27	Tim Richmond 9	Brad Frye 7 Alex Clubb 7 Wayne Peterson 4
Toyota 8 Chevrolet 5 Ford 7	Richmond Clubb Motorsports	27	Alex Clubb 7	Brad Frye 7 Alex Clubb 7 Wayne Peterson 4
Toyota 8 Chevrolet 5 Ford 7	Richmond Clubb Motorsports	27	Zachary Tinkle 4 (Note: At Kansas in October (Race 20), it was a Wayne Peterson Racing entry using Richmond Clubb Motorsports' owner points.)	Brad Frye 7 Alex Clubb 7 Wayne Peterson 4

=== Limited schedule ===
Manufacturer	Team	No.	Driver	Crew chief	Rounds
Chevrolet	AM Racing	32	Howie DiSavino III	Jamie Jones	1
Chevrolet	AM Racing	32	Austin Wayne Self	Jamie Jones	1
Chevrolet	BMI Racing	88	Bridget Burgess	Sarah Burgess	1
Chevrolet	Bret Holmes Racing	23	Bret Holmes	Shane Huffman	4
Chevrolet	Bret Holmes Racing	23	Sam Mayer	Shane Huffman	5
Chevrolet	Brother-In-Law Racing	57	Bryan Dauzat	Bob Rahilly	2
Chevrolet	CR7 Motorsports	97	Jason Kitzmiller	Todd Myers	6
Chevrolet	Empire Racing	8	Sean Corr	Derek Hartnagel	2
Chevrolet	Empire Racing	45	Rich Bickle	Mike Cheek	1
Chevrolet	GMS Racing	21	Jack Wood (R)	Chad Bryant	6
Chevrolet	GMS Racing	21	Daniel Dye	Chad Bryant	6
Chevrolet	GMS Racing	21	Kody Swanson	Chad Bryant	1
Chevrolet	GMS Racing	22	Jack Wood (R)	Chad Walter	1
Chevrolet	Hendren Motorsports	24	Ryan Unzicker	Bill Hendren	2
Chevrolet	Hillis Racing	27	Bobby Hillis Jr.	Ed Ash	1
Chevrolet	Josh Williams Motorsports	60	Brad Perez	Josh Williams	1
Chevrolet	Max Force Racing	9	Thomas Praytor	Tommy Praytor	1
Chevrolet	Mullins Racing	3	Willie Mullins	Tony Furr	1
Chevrolet	Mullins Racing	3	Dale Quarterley	Alex Quarterley	1
Chevrolet	Niece Motorsports	40	Dean Thompson	Matt Weber	1
Chevrolet	Niece Motorsports	50	Jett Noland	Matt Noyce	1
Chevrolet	Niece Motorsports	50	Morgan Alexander	Matt Weber	2
Chevrolet	Niece Motorsports	50	Carson Hocevar	Cody Efaw	1
Chevrolet	Reeves Racing	88	Scott Reeves	Brian Finney	1
Chevrolet	Rev Racing	6	Rajah Caruth	Glenn Parker	5
Chevrolet	Roy Kovski Racing	16	Justin Allgaier	Kelly Kovski	1
Chevrolet	Roy Kovski Racing	16	Kelly Kovski	Jon Hanson	1
Chevrolet	RSS Racing	28	Kyle Sieg	Jeff Green 4 Tony Wilson 7	11
Chevrolet	Spraker Racing Enterprises	63	Dave Mader III	Jeff Spraker	3
Chevrolet	Steve McGowan Motorsports	17	Zane Smith	Bruce Cook	1
Chevrolet	Young's Motorsports	02	Toni Breidinger	Ryan London	5
Chevrolet	Young's Motorsports	02	Mark Green (Note: Entry was fielded in a collaboration with Rev Racing.)	Mark Green	1
Chevrolet	Young's Motorsports	02	Connor Mosack	Bruce Cook 1 Eddie Troconis 1 Ryan London 1	3
Ford	Bull Racing	77	Ed Bull	Ralph Solhem	1
Ford	Central Coast Racing	13	Todd Souza	Michael Muñoz	1
Ford	Charles Buchanan Racing	87	Chuck Buchanan Jr.	Craig Wood	2
Ford	David Gilliland Racing	17	Tanner Gray	Chad Johnston	1
Ford	David Gilliland Racing	17	Taylor Gray	Chad Johnston	9
Ford	David Gilliland Racing	54	Riley Herbst	Richard Boswell	1
Ford	David Gilliland Racing	54	Joey Iest	Seth Smith	2
Ford	Naake-Klauer Motorsports	54	Joey Iest	Mike Naake	1
Ford	High Point Racing (Note: Entry was fielded in a collaboration with Sunrise Ford Racing.)	51	Dean Thompson	Travis Thirkettle	1
Ford	Huff Racing	36	Ryan Huff	Richard Burgess	2
Ford	Rette Jones Racing	30	Brittney Zamora	Mark Rette	1
Ford	Rette Jones Racing	30	Cole Williams	Mark Rette	1
Ford	Rette Jones Racing	30	Max Gutiérrez	Mark Rette	4
Ford	Rette Jones Racing	30	Kris Wright	Mark Rette	5
Ford	Rette Jones Racing	30	Adam Lemke	Mark Rette	1
Ford	Rette Jones Racing	30	Landen Lewis	Mark Rette	1
Ford	Stewart-Haas Racing	14	Chase Briscoe	Johnny Klausmeier	1
Ford	Sunrise Ford Racing	6	Trevor Huddleston	Bill Sedgwick	1
Ford	Sunrise Ford Racing	9	Jake Drew	Jeff Schrader	1
Toyota	Bill McAnally Racing	16	Jesse Love	Travis Sharpe	1
Toyota	Bill McAnally Racing	19	Derek Kraus	John Camilleri	1
Toyota	Bill McAnally Racing	99	Cole Moore	Mario Isola	1
Toyota	Cram Racing Enterprises	94	Benny Chastain	Kevin Cram 2 Bob Schacht 1	2
Toyota	Cram Racing Enterprises	94	Chris Hacker	Kevin Cram 2 Bob Schacht 1	1
Toyota	Derrick Lancaster Racing	29	Derrick Lancaster	Don Akers	2
Toyota	Hattori Racing Enterprises	1	Austin Hill	David McCarty	2
Toyota	Jerry Pitts Racing	7	Takuma Koga	Jerry Pitts	1
Toyota	Joe Gibbs Racing	81	Sammy Smith	Jamie Jones	3
Toyota	MacZink Racing	65	Jeffery MacZink	Jarod MacZink	1
Toyota	Pedroncelli Racing	33	P. J. Pedroncelli	Ty Joiner	1
Toyota	Performance P-1 Motorsports	77	Tony Toste	Dave McKenzie	1
Toyota	TC Motorsports	91	Justin Carroll	Ron Otto 1 Terry Carroll 1	2
Toyota	Venturini Motorsports	55	Derek Griffith	Dave Leiner Jr.	1
Toyota	Venturini Motorsports	55	Parker Chase	Dave Leiner Jr.	1
Toyota	Venturini Motorsports	55	Toni Breidinger	Dave Leiner Jr.	1
Ford 3 Toyota 3	CCM Racing	7	Eric Caudell	Jeremy Petty	6
Chevrolet 3 Toyota 1	Cook-Finley Racing	42	Conner Jones	Amber Slagle 3 Sean Samuels 1	2
Chevrolet 3 Toyota 1	Cook-Finley Racing	42	Tyler Ankrum	Amber Slagle 3 Sean Samuels 1	1
Chevrolet 3 Toyota 1	Cook-Finley Racing	42	Parker Retzlaff	Amber Slagle 3 Sean Samuels 1	1
Chevrolet 2 Toyota 1	Ferrier McClure Racing	44	John Ferrier	Jeff McClure	2
Chevrolet 2 Toyota 1	Ferrier McClure Racing	44	Stephanie Moyer (Note: It was a Fast Track Racing entry using Ferrier McClure Racing's owner points.)	Owen Smith	1
Chevrolet 5 Ford 4	Greg Van Alst Motorsports	35	Greg Van Alst	Jim Long 8 Donnie Richeson 1	9
Ford 6 Chevrolet 1	Jankowiak Motorsports	73	Andy Jankowiak (Note: At Watkins Glen (Race 13) the entry was fielded in a collaboration with Marsh Racing.)	Mike Dayton 6 Andy Seuss 1	7
Ford 6 Chevrolet 1 Toyota 5	Kimmel Racing	69	Scott Melton	Bill Kimmel 10; Will Kimmel 1	7
Ford 6 Chevrolet 1 Toyota 5	Kimmel Racing	69	Russ Lane	Bill Kimmel 10; Will Kimmel 1	2
Ford 6 Chevrolet 1 Toyota 5	Kimmel Racing	69	Will Kimmel	Bill Kimmel 10; Will Kimmel 1	3
Toyota 2 Ford 1	Vanco Racing	66	Ron Vandermeir Jr.	Ron Vandermeir Sr. 1 Jeff McClure 1 Tim Monroe 1	2
Toyota 2 Ford 1	Vanco Racing	66	Kyle Lockrow	Ron Vandermeir Sr. 1 Jeff McClure 1 Tim Monroe 1	1
Toyota 3 Ford 1	Visconti Motorsports	74	Mason Diaz	Tommy Baldwin Jr.	3
Toyota 3 Ford 1	Visconti Motorsports	74	Chris Werth	Ron Otto	1
Chevrolet 6 Ford 7	Wayne Peterson Racing	06	Con Nicolopoulos	Michael Peterson 4 George Gimbert 2 Wayne Peterson 5 Nate Moeller 1	2
Chevrolet 6 Ford 7	Wayne Peterson Racing	06	A. J. Moyer	Michael Peterson 4 George Gimbert 2 Wayne Peterson 5 Nate Moeller 1	2
Chevrolet 6 Ford 7	Wayne Peterson Racing	06	Don Thompson	Michael Peterson 4 George Gimbert 2 Wayne Peterson 5 Nate Moeller 1	2
Chevrolet 6 Ford 7	Wayne Peterson Racing	06	Wayne Peterson	Michael Peterson 4 George Gimbert 2 Wayne Peterson 5 Nate Moeller 1	2
Chevrolet 6 Ford 7	Wayne Peterson Racing	06	Zachary Tinkle	Michael Peterson 4 George Gimbert 2 Wayne Peterson 5 Nate Moeller 1	4
Chevrolet 6 Ford 7	Wayne Peterson Racing	06	Brad Smith	Michael Peterson 4 George Gimbert 2 Wayne Peterson 5 Nate Moeller 1	1

=== Changes ===
==== Teams ====
- On November 13, 2020, it was announced that Lira Motorsports would be returning to the series for the first time since 2017, fielding a part-time entry for late model and NASCAR Roots driver Logan Misuraca. She and the team also announced that they would run part-time in the Truck Series in 2021. They started the season at ARCA's preseason test session at Daytona in January where Misuraca was initially on the entry list in a No. 33 car for Lira, which was later withdrawn. Misuraca revealed in an interview in April that her deal with Lira had fallen through.
- On December 8, 2020, Ken Schrader confirmed that he would be closing down his longtime ARCA team, Ken Schrader Racing, which would only keep its dirt racing operations in 2021. This will be the first season since 1990 where KSR has not competed in the series. Schrader's iconic No. 52 car only competed part-time from 2018 to 2020 due to lack of sponsorship. NASCAR Whelen Modified Tour driver Andy Jankowiak bought some of the assets of Schrader's team to form his own team, Jankowiak Motorsports, and make his debut in the series. They entered the No. 73 car for Jankowiak at Daytona, Talladega, Charlotte, Pocono, Watkins Glen and Bristol.
- On December 22, 2020, it was announced that Mullins Racing would be entering a second car in the season-opener at Daytona. However, due to a lack of sponsorship, this did not end up happening. It would have been the first time they fielded a second car by themselves, as Mullins partnered with other teams to lease their owner points in 2017 and 2018 for Robert Bruce to drive a second Mullins car in the race at Elko both years.
- On December 23, 2020, it was announced that Greg Van Alst, who last competed in the series in 2002, would be starting his own team, the No. 35 Chevy, and running a part-time schedule after buying a car from the closed Chad Bryant Racing.
- On January 8, 2021, ThePitLane revealed that Nick Sanchez would be competing full-time for Rev Racing in the main ARCA Menards Series in 2021, making it the team's first time fielding a full-time car in the series. Sanchez previously competed full-time for Rev Racing in the East Series in 2020 and part-time in 2019. The official announcement of this came on January 15, where it was also revealed that Sanchez would be using the No. 6. However, Sanchez instead ended up using the No. 2.
- On January 14, 2021, it was announced that Win-Tron Racing would merge into AM Racing, a Truck Series team that they have had an alliance with for multiple years and that they have shared a race shop with beginning in 2020. Howie DiSavino III will continue to drive part-time in the team's No. 32 car.
- On January 14, 2021, Truck Series team Young's Motorsports announced that they would expand into the ARCA Menards Series, fielding the No. 02 car on a part-time basis beginning at Daytona. The team participated in the series' Daytona testing in January with Kris Wright (one of their full-time Truck Series drivers) and Toni Breidinger driving. Their first race came at Daytona with Breidinger, who will run a part-time schedule with the team, with it being her first time in the series since 2018.

==== Drivers ====
- On September 15, 2020, it was announced that Sam Mayer, who drove the No. 21 car for GMS Racing part-time in the ARCA Menards Series along with the full season in the East Series (where he won the championship), would move up to the Xfinity Series in June 2021, driving the JR Motorsports No. 8 car, in the second half of the season after he turns 18 and is eligible to race in the series. On November 2, 2020, GMS announced that Jack Wood will drive for them full-time in the East Series and in all of the Showdown races in the main ARCA Menards Series, replacing Mayer in the No. 21. Wood previously drove part-time in the ARCA Menards Series West, fielding his own team, Velocity Racing. The team ended up changing plans again, as Wood instead began driving in the main ARCA Series full-time instead of the East Series. Their full season plans were soon cancelled, as Wood and the team would skip the races at Toledo (in order for him to compete in the Truck Series race at Circuit of the Americas, also driving for GMS) and Mid-Ohio. Soon after, GMS would promote Wood to the Truck Series full-time in their No. 24 truck, and after that, he would only run the Watkins Glen and Bristol ARCA races.
- On December 15, 2020, it was announced that Michael Self, the championship runner-up for the past two years, would be leaving ARCA in 2021 to take a non-driving position with Trans-Am team Silver Hare Racing, becoming the team's general manager. Venturini replaced Self in the No. 25 with multiple drivers. Gracie Trotter, Derek Griffith, Parker Chase, Brandon Jones, Chandler Smith, Jesse Love, and Toni Breidinger all drove the car during the season.
- On December 18, 2020, David Gilliland Racing announced that Joey Iest would join the team to drive in six or more East Series races for the team. Because the 2021 East Series schedule features 8 races, and 3 of them being combination races with the big ARCA Menards Series, at least one of Iest's six races will be in a combination race. Iest ended up driving the full season in the East Series and all 3 combination races in the team's No. 54 car.
- On April 8, 2021, Taylor Gray suffered a fractured L4 vertebra, left foot, and ankle in a single-car accident in Statesville, NC. On July 6, David Gilliland Racing announced that he had recovered and would return to complete the remainder of his scheduled starts, beginning with the race at Elko.
- On July 28, 2021, it was announced that Toni Breidinger would be leaving Young's Motorsports to re-join Venturini Motorsports, the team she drove for part-time in the series in 2018. The races that she ran for them in her part-time schedule are Winchester, Springfield and DuQuoin in the No. 25, and Kansas in the No. 55.
- After being far enough behind to Ty Gibbs and Corey Heim for 1st and 2nd the standings, 3rd and 4th place drivers Thad Moffitt and Nick Sanchez skipped both of the dirt races (Springfield and DuQuoin). Moffitt was replaced in the No. 46 by his DGR teammate Taylor Gray. The No. 17 car, which Gray normally drives, was not entered in those races. Sanchez was replaced by dirt track racing driver Landen Lewis in the No. 2 car, and Rev Racing leased the owner points to Rette Jones Racing, who fielded the entry in a collaboration with 2017 series champion Austin Theriault in those races.

==== Crew chiefs ====
- On December 9, 2020, it was announced that Mardy Lindley, who crew chiefed the No. 21 of Sam Mayer for GMS Racing in 2019 and 2020, would be joining Kyle Busch Motorsports in the Truck Series to crew chief their No. 51. Lindley had originally been announced to return to GMS Racing in 2021 to crew chief Jack Wood, Mayer's replacement.

==== Manufacturers ====
- On December 22, 2020, Willie Mullins announced that his No. 3 car would be a Chevy at Daytona. He bought the car from the closed KBR Development team, which was the same one that David Gravel and Brandon McReynolds drove in the 2020 and 2019 Daytona races, respectively, and that Sheldon Creed drove at Daytona in 2018 for MDM Motorsports. As a result, the Ford that Mullins previously drove in this race was announced to still be used at Daytona and become a new second car for the team with a driver had yet-to-be determined. However, the second car did not end up being fielded at Daytona due to lack of sponsorship.

== Schedule ==
Daytona, Toledo, Pocono, and Talladega revealed their race dates ahead of the release of the entire schedule, which ARCA announced on December 1, 2020. Mid-Ohio, Elko, and DuQuoin received dates on the schedule after all three tracks lost their 2020 race dates due to COVID-19.

Notes:

- The race at Phoenix in March was a combination race with the ARCA Menards Series West (highlighted in gold).
- Races highlighted in silver were combination events with the ARCA Menards Series East.
- The Sioux Chief Showdown races are listed in **bold**.

No	Race title	Track	Date
1	Lucas Oil 200	Daytona International Speedway, Daytona Beach, Florida	February 13
2	General Tire 150	Phoenix Raceway, Phoenix, Arizona	March 12
3	General Tire 200	Talladega Superspeedway, Lincoln, Alabama	April 24
4	Dutch Boy 150	Kansas Speedway, Kansas City	May 1
5	**Herr's Potato Chips 200**	Toledo Speedway, Toledo, Ohio	May 22
6	General Tire 150	Charlotte Motor Speedway, Concord, North Carolina	May 29
7	**Dawn 150**	Mid-Ohio Sports Car Course, Lexington, Ohio	June 4
8	General Tire #AnywhereIsPossible 200	Pocono Raceway, Long Pond, Pennsylvania	June 25
9	**Menards 250**	Elko Speedway, Elko New Market, Minnesota	July 10
10	**Zinsser SmartCoat 200**	Berlin Raceway, Marne, Michigan	July 17
11	**Shore Lunch 150**	Iowa Speedway, Newton, Iowa	July 24
12	**Calypso Lemonade 200**	Winchester Speedway, Winchester, Indiana	July 31
13	**Clean Harbors 100 at The Glen**	Watkins Glen International, Watkins Glen, New York	August 6
14	Henry Ford Health System 200	Michigan International Speedway, Brooklyn, Michigan	August 20
15	Allen Crowe 100	Illinois State Fairgrounds Racetrack, Springfield, Illinois	August 22
16	**Sprecher 150**	Milwaukee Mile, West Allis, Wisconsin	August 29
17	Southern Illinois 100	DuQuoin State Fairgrounds Racetrack, Du Quoin, Illinois	September 5
18	**Bush's Beans 200**	Bristol Motor Speedway, Bristol, Tennessee	September 16
19	**Sioux Chief PowerPEX 200**	Salem Speedway, Salem, Indiana	October 2
20	Reese's 150	Kansas Speedway, Kansas City, Kansas	October 23

=== Broadcasting ===
The TV lineup is similar to what it looked like in 2020, with FS1 airing almost all of the races that occur at tracks that the NASCAR Cup, Xfinity and Truck Series go to and have races at on the same weekend as the ARCA Menards Series and FS1 is at the track to broadcast at least one of those series. The rest of the races are aired on MAVTV. The only races that FS1 is not broadcasting where the Cup, Xfinity and/or Truck Series does have a race at on the same weekend are Phoenix and the season-finale at Kansas, which are both on MAVTV.

FS1 made a change to their broadcasting lineup for their ARCA Menards Series coverage for the 2021 season, as play-by-play announcer Dave Rieff was replaced by longtime NASCAR pit reporter Jamie Little, who became the first woman to ever serve in the play-by-play role on TV in any motorsports series after calling the race at Daytona.

== Results and standings ==
=== Race results ===
No.	Race	Pole position	Most laps led	Winning driver	Manufacturer	No.	Winning team
1	Lucas Oil 200	Drew Dollar	Corey Heim	Corey Heim	Toyota	20	Venturini Motorsports
2	General Tire 150	Ty Gibbs	Ty Gibbs	Ty Gibbs	Toyota	18	Joe Gibbs Racing
3	General Tire 200	Ty Gibbs	Drew Dollar; Bret Holmes (Note: Dollar and Holmes both led 28 laps.)	Corey Heim	Toyota	20	Venturini Motorsports
4	Dutch Boy 150	Ty Gibbs	Ty Gibbs (Note: Gibbs led all of the laps in the race.)	Ty Gibbs	Toyota	18	Joe Gibbs Racing
5	Herr's Potato Chips 200	Ty Gibbs	Ty Gibbs	Ty Gibbs	Toyota	18	Joe Gibbs Racing
6	General Tire 150	Ty Gibbs	Ty Gibbs	Ty Gibbs	Toyota	18	Joe Gibbs Racing
7	Dawn 150	Corey Heim	Ty Gibbs	Ty Gibbs	Toyota	18	Joe Gibbs Racing
8	General Tire #AnywhereIsPossible 200	Ty Gibbs	Ty Gibbs	Corey Heim	Toyota	20	Venturini Motorsports
9	Menards 250	Ty Gibbs	Ty Gibbs	Corey Heim	Toyota	20	Venturini Motorsports
10	Zinsser SmartCoat 200	Daniel Dye	Daniel Dye	Daniel Dye	Chevrolet	21	GMS Racing
11	Shore Lunch 150	Ty Gibbs	Ty Gibbs	Ty Gibbs	Toyota	18	Joe Gibbs Racing
12	Calypso Lemonade 200	Corey Heim	Corey Heim	Ty Gibbs	Toyota	18	Joe Gibbs Racing
13	Clean Harbors 100 at The Glen	Ty Gibbs	Corey Heim	Corey Heim	Toyota	20	Venturini Motorsports
14	Henry Ford Health System 200	Ty Gibbs	Ty Gibbs	Ty Gibbs	Toyota	18	Joe Gibbs Racing
15	Allen Crowe 100	Corey Heim	Corey Heim	Corey Heim	Toyota	20	Venturini Motorsports
16	Sprecher 150	Ty Gibbs	Ty Gibbs	Ty Gibbs	Toyota	18	Joe Gibbs Racing
17	Southern Illinois 100	Landen Lewis	Landen Lewis (Note: Lewis led all of the laps in the race.)	Landen Lewis	Toyota	2	Rette Jones Racing
18	Bush's Beans 200	Ty Gibbs	Ty Gibbs	Ty Gibbs	Toyota	18	Joe Gibbs Racing
19	Sioux Chief PowerPEX 200	Ty Gibbs	Ty Gibbs	Jesse Love	Toyota	15	Venturini Motorsports
20	Reese's 150	Ty Gibbs	Ty Gibbs	Nick Sanchez	Chevrolet	2	Rev Racing

=== Drivers' championship ===
Notes:

- The pole winner also receives one bonus point, similar to the previous ARCA points system used until 2019 and unlike NASCAR.
- Additionally, after groups of five races of the season, drivers that compete in all five races receive fifty additional points.
  - Corey Heim, Ty Gibbs, Thad Moffitt, Nick Sanchez, and D. L. Wilson received this points bonus for having competed in the first five races of the season (Daytona, Phoenix, Talladega, Kansas in May, and Toledo). Heim, Gibbs, Moffitt, Sanchez and Brad Smith received the fifty bonus points for having competed in the next five races (Charlotte, Mid-Ohio, Pocono, Elko, and Berlin). Heim, Gibbs and Smith received the fifty bonus points for having competed in the next five races (Iowa, Winchester, Watkins Glen, Michigan, and Springfield) and the next five races (Milwaukee, DuQuoin, Bristol, Salem, and Kansas in October).

(key) Bold – Pole position awarded by time. Italics – Pole position set by final practice results or rainout. * – Most laps led. ** – All laps led.

Pos	Driver	DAY	PHO	TAL	KAN	TOL	CLT	MOH	POC	ELK	BER	IOW	WIN	GLN	MCH	ISF	MLW	DSF	BRI	SLM	KAN	Points
1	Ty Gibbs	4	1*	27	**1****	**1***	**1****	1*	**2***	**4***	2	**1***	1	**3**	**1***	2	**1****	2	**1***	**2***	**2***	1092
2	Corey Heim	1*	2	1	3	2	2	**7**	1	1	3	4	**3***	1*	2	**1***	6	7	5	7	3	1055
3	Nick Sanchez **(R)**	31	21	3	9	3	5	5	4	6	6	5	14	8	3		12		4	17	1	739
4	Thad Moffitt	21	3	6	6	5	7	3	5	9	12	6	4	11	8		9		25			666
5	Brad Smith		26	29	16	11	19	16	16	14	14	19	16	28	11	14	22	14	24	16	23	638
6	D. L. Wilson	26	20	19	11	12	23					16	12	27	19	10		11	28		18	464
7	Drew Dollar	**2**	7	4*	2		3	12	3			11		15	18				8		4	444
8	Taylor Gray		9							5	4	3	5	7		3	4	5	3	11		428
9	Kyle Sieg	5	4	8	8		12	10	6					12	5				11		7	396
10	Jesse Love		6			4				2	5	7				5	7	10	7	1		386
11	Gracie Trotter	23	27	22		7				3	8				13		10			5		279
12	Owen Smith	33			18	14	17	14		16	9		17			16		13				273
13	Toni Breidinger	18	30	12	12		20						9			9		12			16	258
14	Tim Richmond	19	13	24			13	13	14			13		17	17							253
15	Jack Wood **(R)**	9	29	11	4		6		18					10					13			253
16	Greg Van Alst	29		26	7		14		DNS				2		6				15		14	242
17	Zachary Tinkle										13		11		15	12		8	20	18	17	238
18	Daniel Dye									7	**1***	2	13				3		12			231
19	Tony Cosentino					13	22	15			15	22	10	26	20		23					230
20	Andy Jankowiak	8		7			9		7					16					26		13	222
21	Alex Clubb				10	8				12	11		15			15	17					220
22	Scott Melton	32		10	20		16		23						14						12	181
23	Rajah Caruth											9					13		6	3	9	180
24	Jason Kitzmiller	11		15			11		17						12				22			177
25	Eric Caudell	16		9	14							14					21				19	171
26	Kris Wright							8	24				8	13							6	161
27	Sam Mayer								22					14	4		2		29			149
28	Parker Chase						4						7						9		10	146
29	Bret Holmes	3		5*	19							10										141
30	Max Gutiérrez						15					12					15		14			120
31	Ed Pompa			13					13					18						14		118
32	Landen Lewis															7		**1****		13		117
33	Joey Iest		16									20					8		19			113
34	Will Kimmel															6		9		4		113
35	Sammy Smith											18					5		2			107
36	Mason Mingus										7								17	6		102
37	Dave Mader III	27		2			8															95
38	Richard Garvie	17	19	25															23			92
39	Ron Vandermeir Jr.									11							14				15	92
40	Stephanie Moyer								15			23					20		27			91
41	Dick Doheny				17	10				15												90
42	Connor Mosack														16		15				11	89
43	Arnout Kok							9						19			DNS				20	63
44	Willie Mullins	28								8										12		84
45	Austin Hill							2						2								84
46	Brandon Jones							4						5								80
47	Jason Miles				15		21										18					78
48	Bryce Haugeberg		25							13		17										77
49	Ken Schrader																	3		10		75
50	J. P. Bergeron																			8	5	75
51	Mason Diaz											8					19		31			74
52	Tim Monroe															8		6				74
53	Brandon Varney												6		10							72
54	Ryan Unzicker															13		4				71
55	Sean Corr	10							9													69
56	Dean Thompson		15																		8	65
57	Ryan Huff			14					10													64
58	A. J. Moyer					9														15		64
59	Morgan Alexander										10	15										63
60	Jade Buford								8										18			62
61	Derrick Lancaster	6		23																		61
62	Wayne Peterson									17								15			DNS	59
63	Justin Carroll				13														16			59
64	Conner Jones											21							10			57
65	Russ Lane							11						21								56
66	Derek Griffith	30			5																	54
67	Bryan Dauzat			18					20													50
68	Chuck Buchanan Jr.						18												21			49
69	John Ferrier	12		28																		48
70	Benny Chastain	20		21																		47
71	Con Nicolopoulos	22		20																		46
72	Carson Hocevar													4								40
73	Justin Allgaier															4						40
74	Don Thompson								19										30			39
75	Derek Kraus		5																			39
76	Tanner Gray	7																				38
77	Cole Williams					6																38
78	Stanton Barrett							6														38
79	Riley Herbst													6								38
80	Morgen Baird														7							37
81	Todd Souza		8																			36
82	Austin Wayne Self													9								35
83	Jeffery MacZink														9							35
84	Kody Swanson																			9		35
85	Trevor Huddleston		10																			34
86	Chris Hacker						10															34
87	Adam Lemke									10												34
88	P. J. Pedroncelli		11																			33
89	Jett Noland								11													33
90	Chandler Smith							12														33
91	Mike Goudie															11						33
92	Parker Retzlaff																11					33
93	Cole Moore		12																			32
94	Howie DiSavino III	13																				31
95	Jason White	14																				30
96	Mark Lowrey		14																			30
97	Rich Bickle	15																				29
98	Michael Harper			16																		29
99	Mike Basham										16											28
100	Tony Toste		17																			27
101	Thomas Praytor			17																		27
102	Mark Green							17														27
103	Jake Drew		18																			26
104	Chris Werth													20								24
105	Nick Igdalsky								21													23
106	Kyle Lockrow																				21	23
107	Bridget Burgess		22																			22
108	Tyler Ankrum													22								22
109	Chase Briscoe													23								22
110	Takuma Koga		23																			21
111	Scott Reeves	24																				20
112	Bobby Hillis Jr.		24																			20
113	Brad Perez													24								20
114	Chuck Hiers	25																				19
115	Dale Quarterley													25								19
116	Zane Smith		28																			16
117	Brittney Zamora	34																				10
	Ed Bull													DNS								3
	Kelly Kovski																	DNS				3

== See also ==
- 2021 NASCAR Cup Series
- 2021 NASCAR Xfinity Series
- 2021 NASCAR Camping World Truck Series
- 2021 ARCA Menards Series East
- 2021 ARCA Menards Series West
- 2021 NASCAR Whelen Modified Tour
- 2021 NASCAR Pinty's Series
- 2021 NASCAR PEAK Mexico Series
- 2021 NASCAR Whelen Euro Series
- 2021 eNASCAR iRacing Pro Invitational Series
- 2021 SRX Series
- 2021 Southern Modified Auto Racing Teams season
