= Zinsser SmartCoat 150 =

ARCA Menards Series race at Mid-Ohio Sports Car Course

ARCA Menards Series
- Venue: Mid-Ohio Sports Car Course
- Location: Lexington, Ohio
- Corporate sponsor: Zinsser SmartCoat
- First race: 1965
- Last race: 2024
- Distance: 150 mi (240 km)
- Laps: 42
- Most wins (driver): Jack Bowsher, Ty Gibbs, Taylor Gray & William Sawalich (1)
- Most wins (team): Joe Gibbs Racing (2)
- Most wins (manufacturer): Toyota (3)

Circuit information
- Length: 2.258 mi (3.634 km)
- Turns: 13

The Zinsser SmartCoat 150 was a 150-mile (240 km) annual ARCA Menards Series race held at Mid-Ohio Sports Car Course in Lexington, Ohio.

== History ==
ARCA first ran a race at Mid-Ohio in 1965. The 252-mile (406 km), 150-lap race was run on May 18 on the original 15-turn circuit and was won by Jack Bowsher. On October 8, 2019, ARCA announced that it would return to the track for the 2020 season with a race on Friday, May 29, on the same weekend as the Xfinity Series race there, which was previously in August. However, that year, those races would be cancelled due to the COVID-19 pandemic. They were added back on the schedule for 2021, but now on the first weekend in June due to Memorial Day (and therefore, the races at Charlotte) being late in 2021. The dishwashing soap company Dawn was announced as the title sponsor of the ARCA race at Mid-Ohio on May 14, 2021. The 2022 race was moved from June to July. In 2023, Dawn moved their title sponsorship to the spring ARCA race at Kansas while the paint and primer brand Zinsser SmartCoat became the title sponsor of the race at Mid-Ohio.

== Past winners ==
Year	Date	No.	Driver	Team	Manufacturer	Race Distance		Race Time	Average Speed (mph)
Year	Date	No.	Driver	Team	Manufacturer	Laps	Miles (km)	Race Time	Average Speed (mph)
1965	July 25		Jack Bowsher	Bowsher Motorsports	Ford	105	252 (405.555)	3:34:19	70.550
1966 – 2019	Not held								
2020	May 29	Cancelled due to the COVID-19 pandemic							
2021	June 4	18	Ty Gibbs	Joe Gibbs Racing	Toyota	42	94.836 (152.62)	1:19:21	71.456
2022	July 8	17	Taylor Gray	David Gilliland Racing	Ford	42	94.836 (152.62)	1:37:33	58.124
2023	July 7	61	Tyler Ankrum	Hattori Racing Enterprises	Toyota	42	94.836 (152.62)	1:22.26	68.783
2024	June 21	18	William Sawalich	Joe Gibbs Racing	Toyota	42	94.836 (152.62)	1:25:28	66.342

=== Multiple winners (teams) ===
# Wins	Team	Years won
2	Joe Gibbs Racing	2021, 2024
1	Bowsher Motorsports	1965
1	David Gilliland Racing	2022
1	Hattori Racing Enterprises	2023

=== Manufacturer wins ===
# Wins	Manufacturer	Years won
3	Toyota	2021, 2023, 2024
2	Ford	1965, 2022
