= Tony Cosentino =

American racing driver (born 1988)

- Born: Tony Cosentino; August 25, 1988 (age 38); Mansfield, Ohio, U.S.

ARCA Menards Series career
- 37 races run over 5 years
- Best finish: 10th (2025)
- First race: 2021 Herr's Potato Chips 200 (Toledo)
- Last race: 2026 Atlas 200 (Madison)
Wins	Top tens	Poles
0	8	0

ARCA Menards Series East career
- 8 races run over 3 years
- Best finish: 12th (2025)
- First race: 2021 Shore Lunch 150 (Iowa)
- Last race: 2025 Bush's Beans 200 (Bristol)
Wins	Top tens	Poles
0	0	0

ARCA Menards Series West career
- 6 races run over 4 years
- Best finish: 23rd (2019)
- First race: 2019 NAPA Auto Parts 150 (Evergreen)
- Last race: 2026 General Tire 150 (Phoenix)
Wins	Top tens	Poles
0	0	0
- Statistics up to date as of August 28, 2026.

Tony Cosentino (born August 25, 1988) is an American professional stock car racing driver. He last competed part-time in the ARCA Menards Series, driving the No. 11 Chevrolet for Fast Track Racing.

== Racing career ==
=== K&N Pro Series West ===
Cosentino made his NASCAR K&N Pro Series West (now the ARCA Menards Series West) debut in 2019, running three races at Evergreen Speedway, Meridian Speedway, and Phoenix Raceway. His best finish was fifteenth at Evergreen. He failed to finish any races.

=== ARCA Menards Series East ===
Cosentino ran two races in the ARCA Menards Series East in 2021, running at Iowa Speedway and the Milwaukee Mile. He failed to finish both races.

=== ARCA Menards Series ===
Cosentino ran ten races in his debut season in the ARCA Menards Series in 2021 driving multiple entries for Fast Track Racing. Cosentino DNF'ed in all but one race. In that race, at Winchester Speedway, Cosentino finished tenth, his first career top-ten finish. He would run three more races for the team in 2022 with a best finish of ninth at Charlotte Motor Speedway.

In 2023, it was announced that Cosentino would run full-time in the series in the No. 45 Chevrolet/Ford for the newly formed Tamayo Cosentino Racing, a team he owns along with Floridian driver E. J. Tamayo. However, due to an unknown reason, he withdrew at both Mid-Ohio and Iowa. At Pocono, Don Thompson instead drove the No. 45. Since then, the No. 45 has not made another appearance later on. However, at Elko in 2024, Tamayo did make the team's only start that year.

On February 22, 2025, it was announced that Cosentino would return to Fast Track Racing on a partial schedule, beginning at Phoenix Raceway. Despite competing in only fourteen races, Cosentino had three top-ten finishes, and finished tenth in the point standings.

On January 12, 2026, it was announced that Cosentino will drive full-time, driving the No. 1 for Maples Motorsports. On April 14, however, it was revealed that Cosentino would leave the team to focus on running in the CARS Tour.

== Motorsports career results ==
=== Stock car career summary ===
Season	Series	Team	Races	Wins	Top 5	Top 10	Points	Position
2019	NASCAR K&N Pro Series East	Kevin McCarty	3	0	0	0	78	23rd
2021	ARCA Menards Series East	Fast Track Racing	2	0	0	0	43	32nd
2021	ARCA Menards Series	Fast Track Racing	10	0	0	1	231	19th
2022	ARCA Menards Series East	Fast Track Racing	2	0	0	0	60	32nd
2022	ARCA Menards Series	Fast Track Racing	3	0	0	1	83	45th
2023	ARCA Menards Series West	Tamayo Cosentino Racing	1	0	0	0	29	51st
2023	ARCA Menards Series East	Tamayo Cosentino Racing	0	0	0	0	0	N/A
2023	ARCA Menards Series	Tamayo Cosentino Racing	7	0	0	2	276	16th
2025	ARCA Menards Serie East	Fast Track Racing	4	0	0	0	151	12th
2025	ARCA Menards Series	Fast Track Racing	14	0	0	3	453	10th
2026	CARS Pro Late Model Tour	LRT Motorsports	4	0	0	0	77	25th
2026	ARCA Menards Series West	Maples Motorsports	1	0	0	0	19	83rd
2026	ARCA Menards Series	Maples Motorsports	1	0	0	0	86	50th
2026	ARCA Menards Series	Fast Track Racing	2	0	0	1	86	50th

=== ARCA Menards Series ===
(key) (Bold – Pole position awarded by qualifying time. Italics – Pole position earned by points standings or practice time. * – Most laps led. ** – All laps led.)

ARCA Menards Series results
Year	Team	No.	Make	1	2	3	4	5	6	7	8	9	10	11	12	13	14	15	16	17	18	19	20	AMSC	Pts	Ref
2021	Fast Track Racing	11	Toyota	DAY	PHO	TAL	KAN	TOL; 13	CLT; 22						WIN; 10				MLW; 23	DSF	BRI	SLM		19th	231	
2021	Fast Track Racing	11	Ford							MOH; 15	POC	ELK												19th	231	
2021	Fast Track Racing	12	Toyota										BLN; 15	IOW; 22		GLN; 26							KAN; 22	19th	231	
2021	Fast Track Racing	01	Chevy														MCH; 20	ISF						19th	231	
2022	Fast Track Racing	11	Toyota	DAY	PHO	TAL	KAN	CLT; 9	IOW	BLN	ELK													45th	83	
2022	Fast Track Racing	12	Toyota									MOH; 19	POC	IRP	MCH	GLN	ISF	MLW	DSF	KAN	BRI	SLM		45th	83	
2022	Fast Track Racing	10	Toyota																				TOL; 20	45th	83	
2023	Tamayo Cosentino Racing	45	Chevy	DAY; 15	PHO; 15	TAL; 11	KAN; 15	CLT; 11																16th	276	
2023	Tamayo Cosentino Racing	45	Ford						BLN; 8	ELK; 7	MOH; Wth	IOW; Wth	POC	MCH	IRP	GLN	ISF	MLW	DSF	KAN	BRI	SLM	TOL; Wth	16th	276	
2025	Fast Track Racing	9	Toyota	DAY	PHO; 26	TAL	KAN																	10th	453	
2025	Fast Track Racing	10	Toyota					CLT; 11	MCH; 22								ISF; 11							10th	453	
2025	Fast Track Racing	11	Ford							BLN; 16	ELK	LRP									SLM; 9	KAN; 15	TOL; 11	10th	453	
2025	Fast Track Racing	10	Ford										DOV; 22	IRP; 21	IOW; 14	GLN		MAD; 9		BRI; 18				10th	453	
2025	Fast Track Racing	12	Toyota																DSF; 8					10th	453	
2026	Maples Motorsports	1	Ford	DAY; DNQ																				50th	86	
2026	Maples Motorsports	1	Chevy		PHO; 25	KAN	TAL	GLN	TOL	MCH	POC	BER	ELK	CHI	LRP	IRP	IOW							50th	86	
2026	Fast Track Racing	11	Chevy															ISF; 14						50th	86	
2026	Fast Track Racing	10	Toyota																MAD; 10	DSF	SLM	BRI	KAN	50th	86	

==== ARCA Menards Series East ====
ARCA Menards Series East results
Year	Team	No.	Make	1	2	3	4	5	6	7	8	AMSEC	Pts	Ref
2021	Fast Track Racing	12	Toyota	NSM	FIF	NSV	DOV	SNM	IOW; 22			32nd	43	
2021	Fast Track Racing	11	Toyota							MLW; 23	BRI	32nd	43	
2022	Fast Track Racing	12	Toyota	NSM; 14	FIF	DOV						32nd	60	
2022	Fast Track Racing	12	Chevy				NSV; 14	IOW	MLW	BRI		32nd	60	
2023	Tamayo Cosentino Racing	45	Ford	FIF	DOV	NSV	FRS	IOW; Wth	IRP	MLW	BRI	N/A	0	
2025	Fast Track Racing	10	Ford	FIF	CAR	NSV	FRS	DOV; 22	IRP; 21	IOW; 14	BRI; 18	12th	151	

==== ARCA Menards Series West ====
ARCA Menards Series West results
Year	Car owner	No.	Make	1	2	3	4	5	6	7	8	9	10	11	12	13	14	AMSWC	Pts	Ref
2019	Kevin McCarty	36	Toyota	LVS	IRW	TUS	TUS	CNS	SON	DCS	IOW	EVG; 15	GTW					23rd	78	
2019	Kevin McCarty	34	Toyota											MER; 16	AAS	KCR		23rd	78	
2019	Kevin McCarty	38	Toyota														PHO; 23	23rd	78	
2023	Tamayo Cosentino Racing	45	Chevy	PHO; 15	IRW	KCR	PIR	SON	IRW	SHA	EVG	AAS	LVS	MAD	PHO			51st	29	
2025	Fast Track Racing	9	Toyota	KER	PHO; 26	TUC	CNS	KER	SON	TRI	PIR	AAS	MAD	LVS	PHO			77th	18	
2026	Maples Motorsports	1	Chevy	KER	PHO; 25	TUC	SHA	CNS	TRI	SON	PIR	AAS	MAD	LVS	PHO	KER		83rd	19	

=== CARS Pro Late Model Tour ===
(key)

CARS Pro Late Model Tour results
Year	Team	No.	Make	1	2	3	4	5	6	7	8	9	10	11	CPLMTC	Pts	Ref
2026	LRT Motorsports	11	Chevy	SNM; 23	NSV; 29		ACE; 16	NWS	HCY	AND	FLC	TCM	NPS	SBO	25th	77	
2026	LRT Motorsports	03	Chevy			CRW; 23									25th	77	
