= Kyle Sieg =

American racing driver (born 2001)

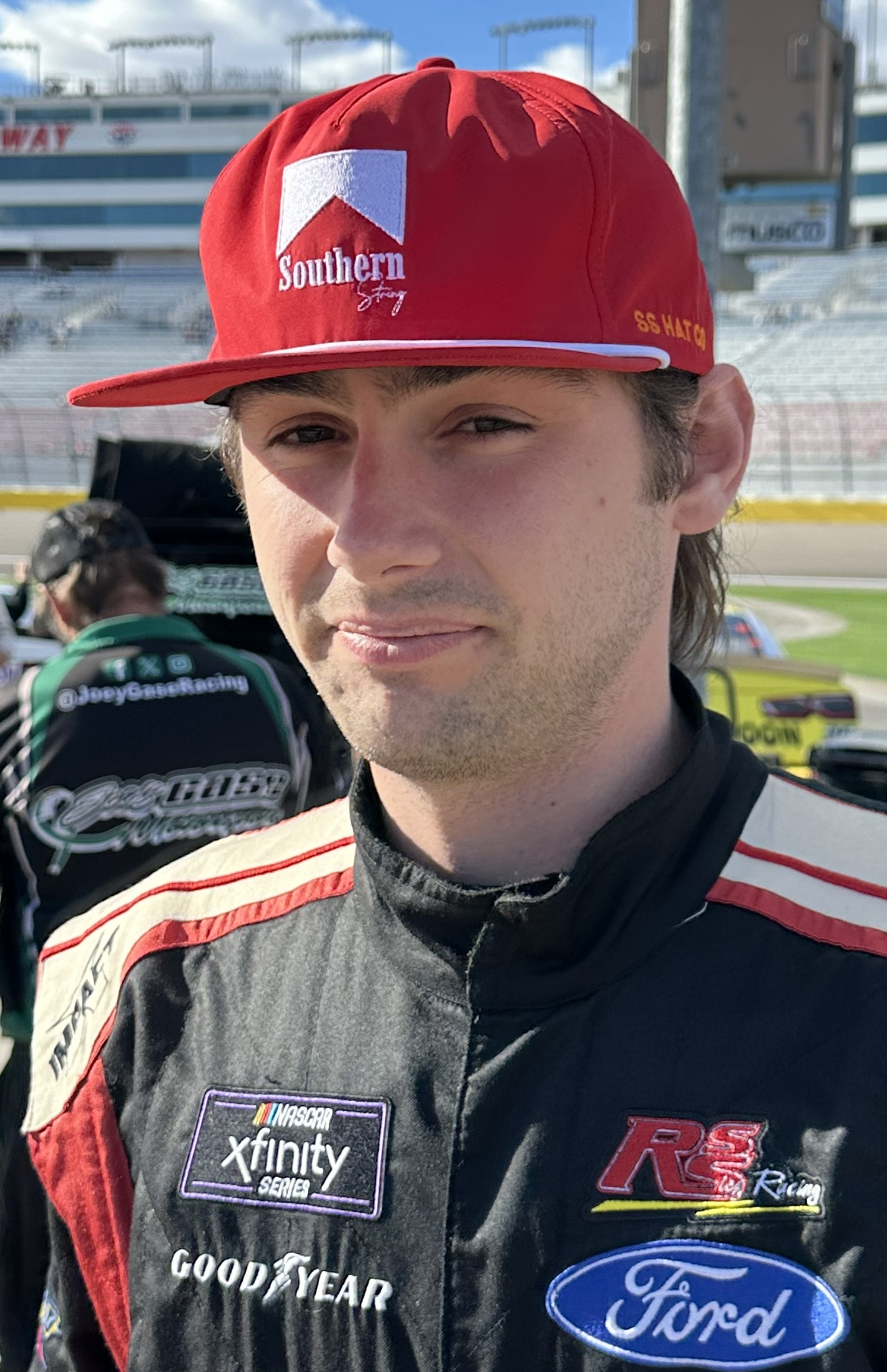
- Sieg at Las Vegas Motor Speedway in 2024
- Born: Kyle Christian Sieg; April 16, 2001 (age 25); Tucker, Georgia, U.S.

NASCAR O'Reilly Auto Parts Series career
- 147 races run over 6 years
- Car no., team: No. 28 (RSS Racing)
- 2026 position: 24th
- Best finish: 22nd (2023)
- First race: 2021 Drydene 200 (Dover)
- Last race: 2026 O'Reilly Auto Parts 300 (Homestead)
Wins	Top tens	Poles
0	6	0

ARCA Menards Series career
- 14 races run over 2 years
- Best finish: 9th (2021)
- First race: 2020 Calypso Lemonade 200 (IRP)
- Last race: 2021 Reese's 150 (Kansas)
Wins	Top tens	Poles
0	9	0

ARCA Menards Series East career
- 4 races run over 2 years
- Best finish: 25th (2021)
- First race: 2020 General Tire 125 (Dover)
- Last race: 2021 Bush's Beans 200 (Bristol)
Wins	Top tens	Poles
0	0	0

ARCA Menards Series West career
- 2 races run over 2 years
- Best finish: 40th (2021)
- First race: 2021 Arizona Lottery 100 (Phoenix)
- Last race: 2023 Portland 112 (Portland)
Wins	Top tens	Poles
0	1	0
- Statistics up to date as of November 7, 2026.

Kyle Christian Sieg (born April 16, 2001) is an American professional stock car racing driver. He competes full-time in the NASCAR O'Reilly Auto Parts Series, driving the No. 28 Chevrolet SS for RSS Racing. He is the youngest son of RSS team owner Rod Sieg and brother of current driver Ryan Sieg and the late Shane Sieg.

== Racing career ==
=== NASCAR and ARCA ===
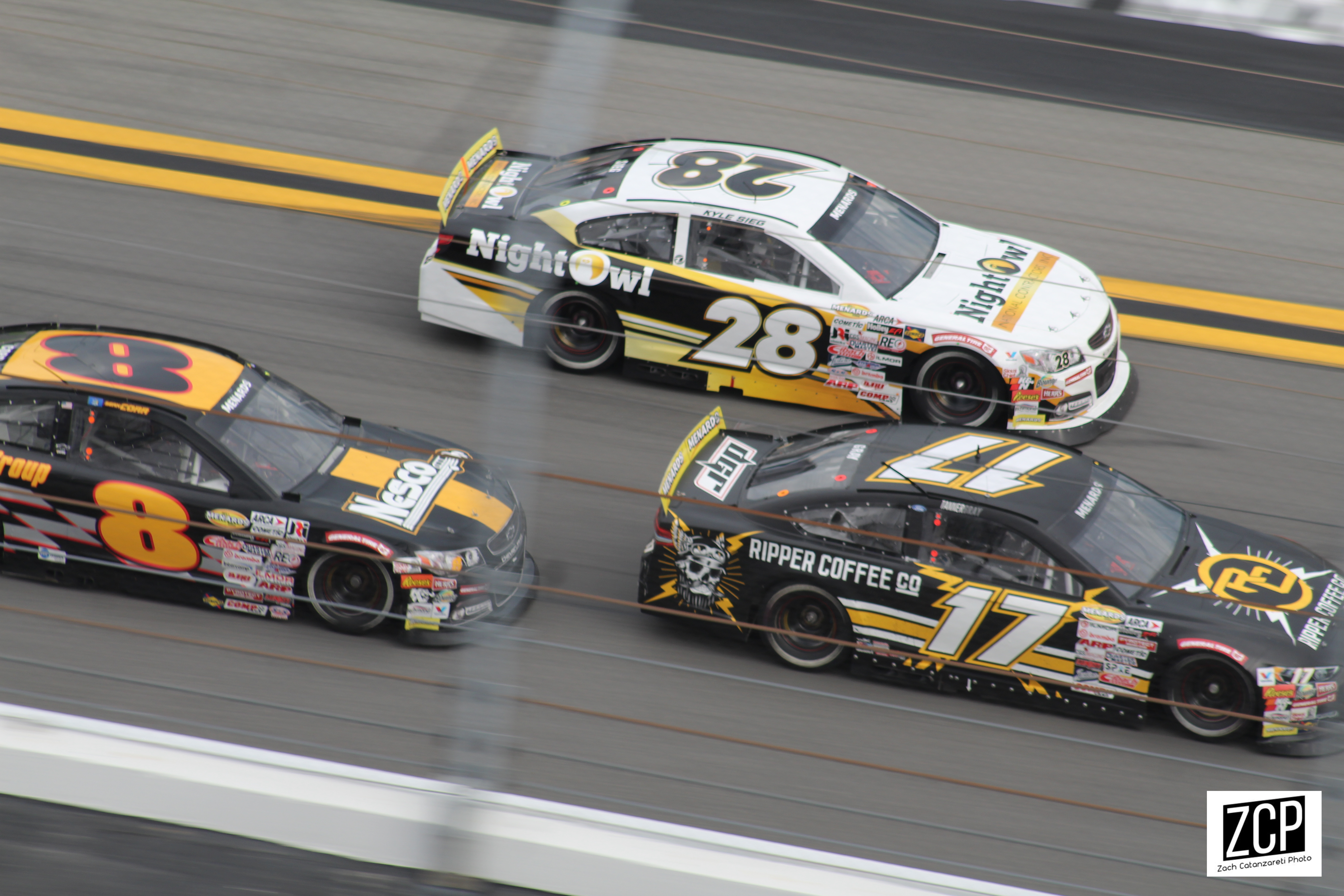
Sieg (No. 28) racing Sean Corr (No. 8) and Tanner Gray (No. 17) for position in the ARCA season-opener at Daytona in 2021

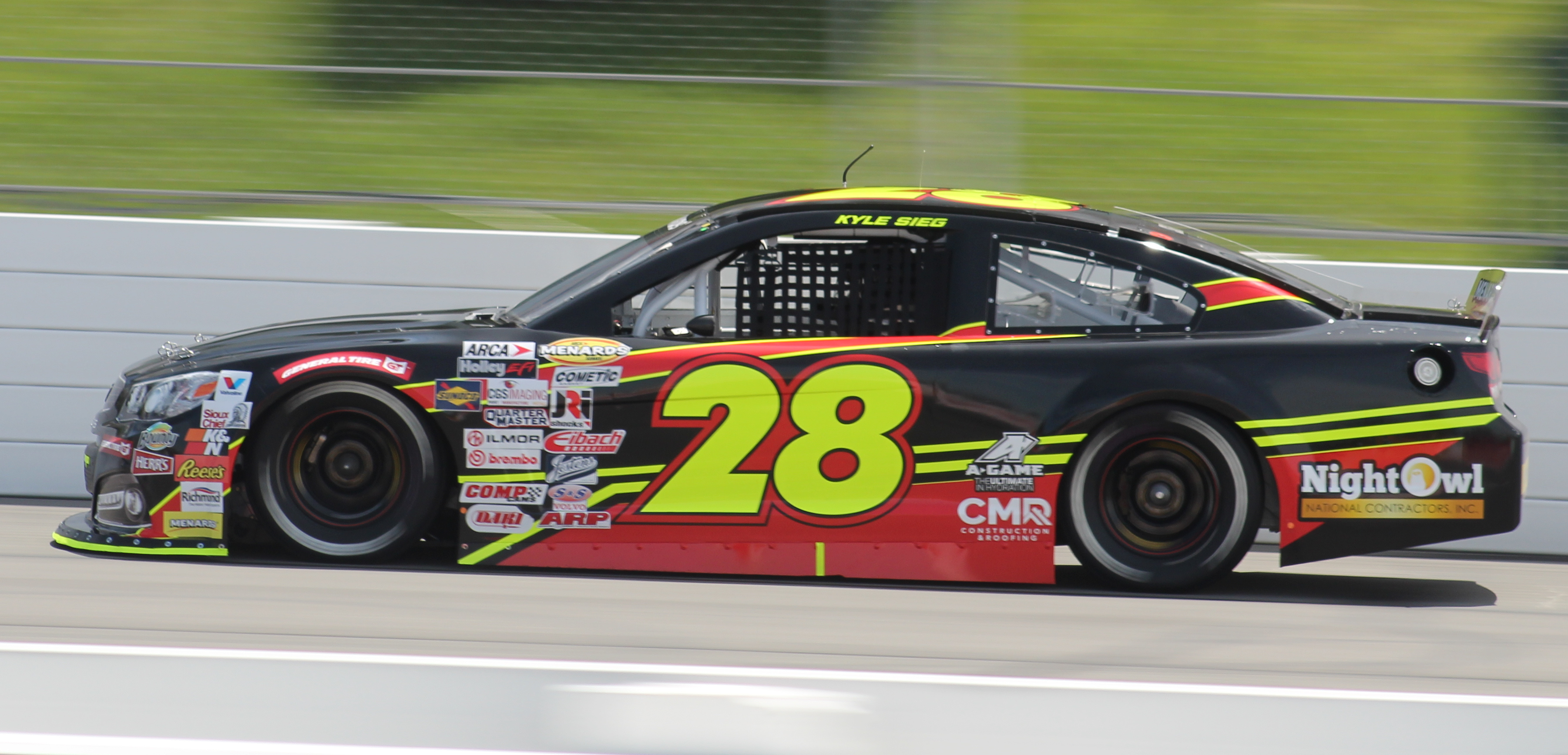
Sieg competing at Pocono in 2021.

In 2020, Sieg made his ARCA Menards Series debut for Cook-Finley Racing in the No. 42 Chevrolet in the race at IRP and finished tenth. The next month, he made his debut in the ARCA Menards Series East, finishing eleventh in the race at Dover in Cook-Finley's No. 41 car. He then ran the main ARCA Series/East Series combination race at Bristol, finishing in seventeenth.

In 2021, it was announced that he would run the first four races of the season with hopes of a full season in the No. 28 for his family team, RSS Racing. In those first four races, Sieg would finish in the top-ten in all of them, including two top-five's at Phoenix and Talladega. On May 12, it was announced that Sieg would make his debut in the Xfinity Series in the race at Dover in the No. 90 for DGM Racing in a partnership with RSS Racing. Sieg finished 34th after blowing a tire late in the race. That same weekend, he entered the East Series race at Dover for the second year in a row, finishing thirteenth in the RSS No. 28.

In 2022, Sieg competed part-time for RSS Racing's No. 28, 38, and 39 Ford Mustangs, he would also compete for Rookie of the year honors. At the Wawa 250 at Daytona, Sieg finished tenth, earning his career-best finish.

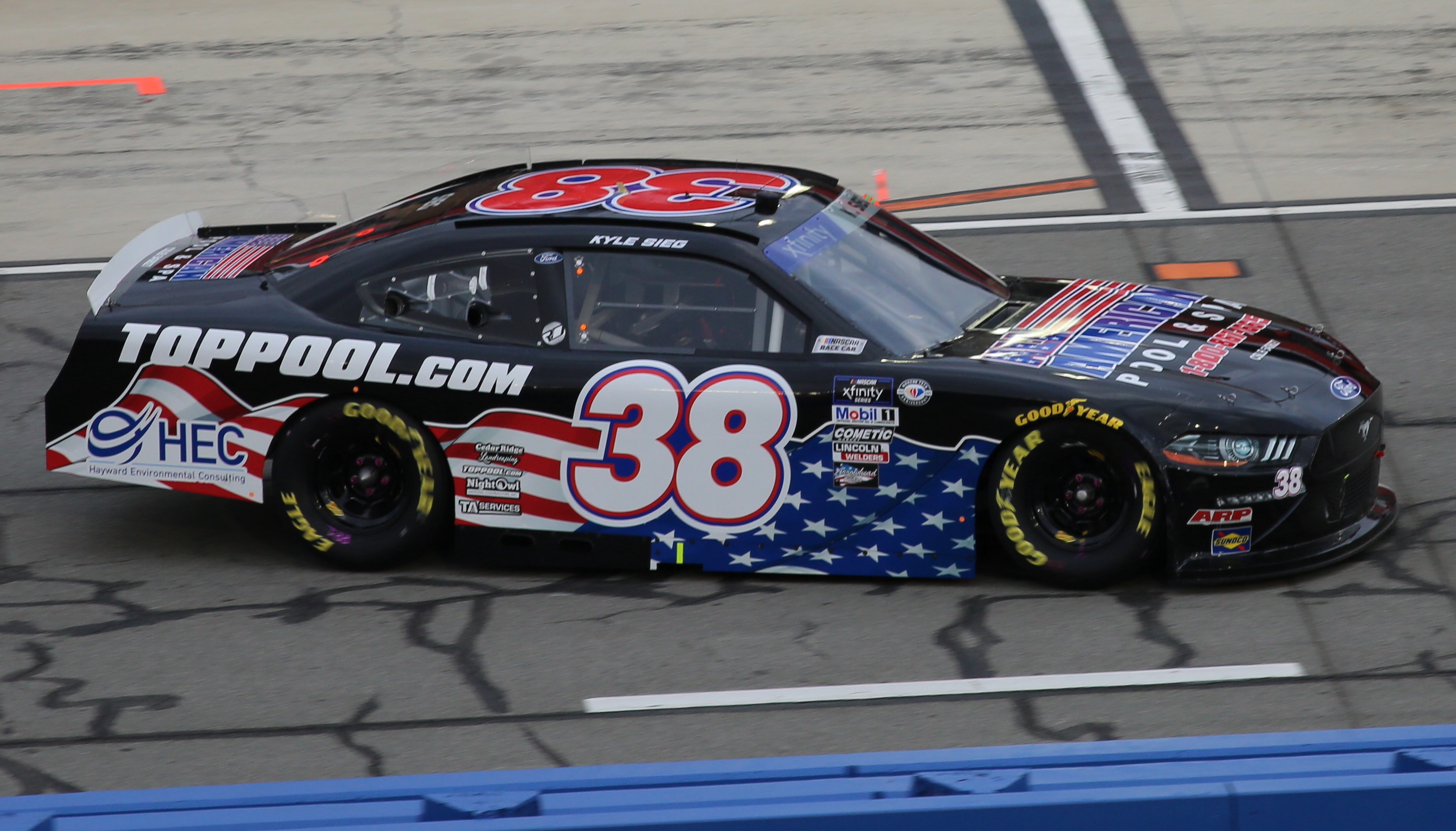
Sieg at Auto Club Speedway in 2023

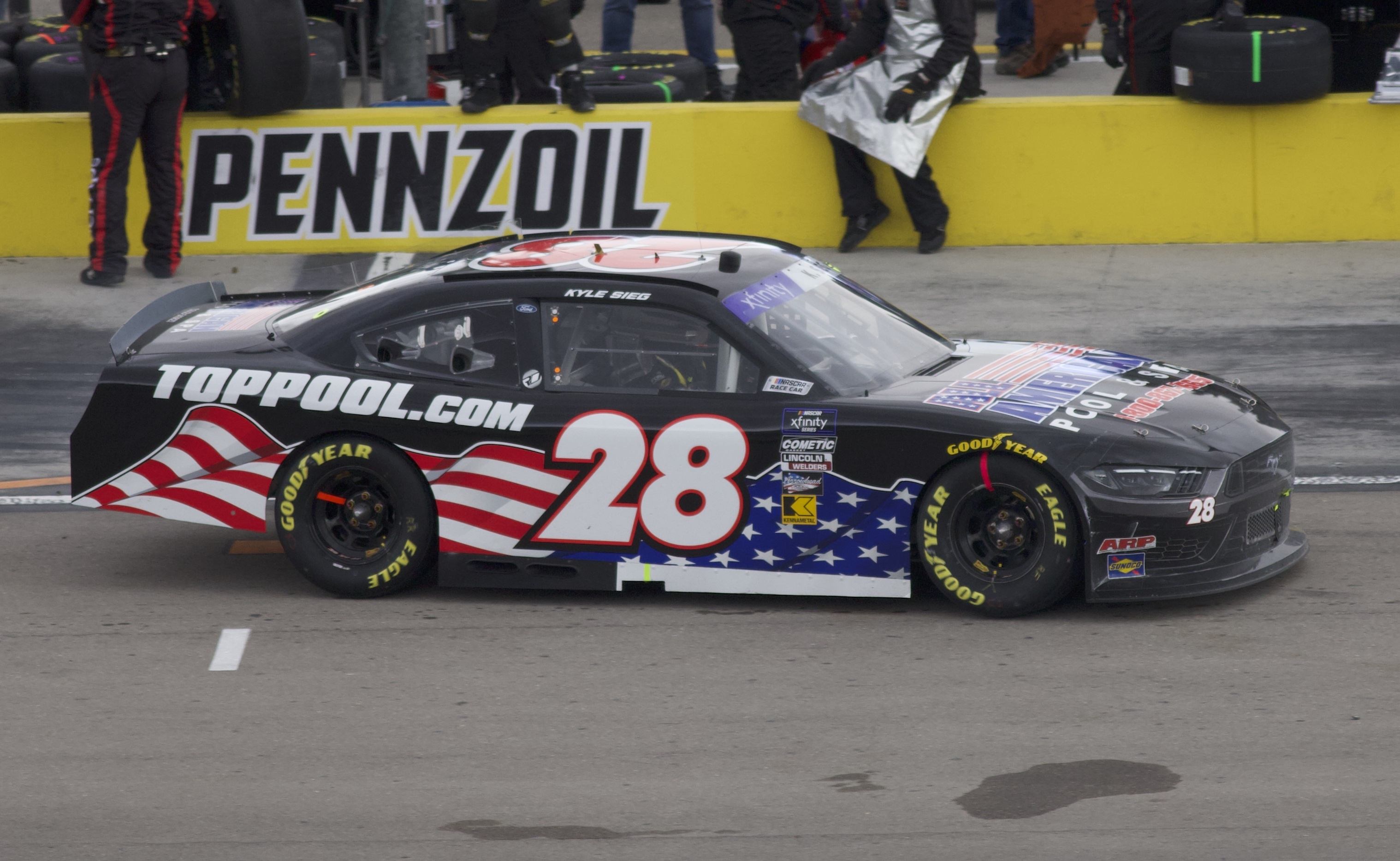
Sieg's No. 28 car at Las Vegas Motor Speedway in 2024.

On February 1, 2023, RSS Racing announced that Kyle would drive full-time in the No. 28 for the 2023 season. On April 22 at Talladega, Sieg was close to scoring his first top-five finish after he was in the top-five in the closing laps of the race but ultimately fell back and finished fifteenth. In 31 races, Sieg scored one top-ten with a seventh place finish in the summer race at Atlanta, had an average finish of 23.5, and finished 22nd in points.

Sieg DNQ'd to start the 2024 season at Daytona. At Michigan, Sieg was running near the top-ten on the last lap down the backstretch where he went low to avoid a spinning Carson Kvapil but got hooked in the left rear by Chandler Smith and both Sieg and Smith went spinning to the inside. Sieg's car caught air, did a blowover, landed on its roof, and scraped on its roof while hitting the inside wall passenger side first before it entered the grass and flipped his car back on all four wheels. Sieg was able to climb out of his car and was unhurt. Sieg would be placed in 28th to finish the race. His car was taken to the NASCAR Research and Development center to be studied, as the video showed the roof flaps, which were used to keep the car on the ground but did not deploy to keep the car on the ground. For the final five races of the season, Kyle and his brother Ryan switched car numbers with Kyle going to the 39 and Ryan to the 28 as Ryan was trying to get his No. 28 more owners points.

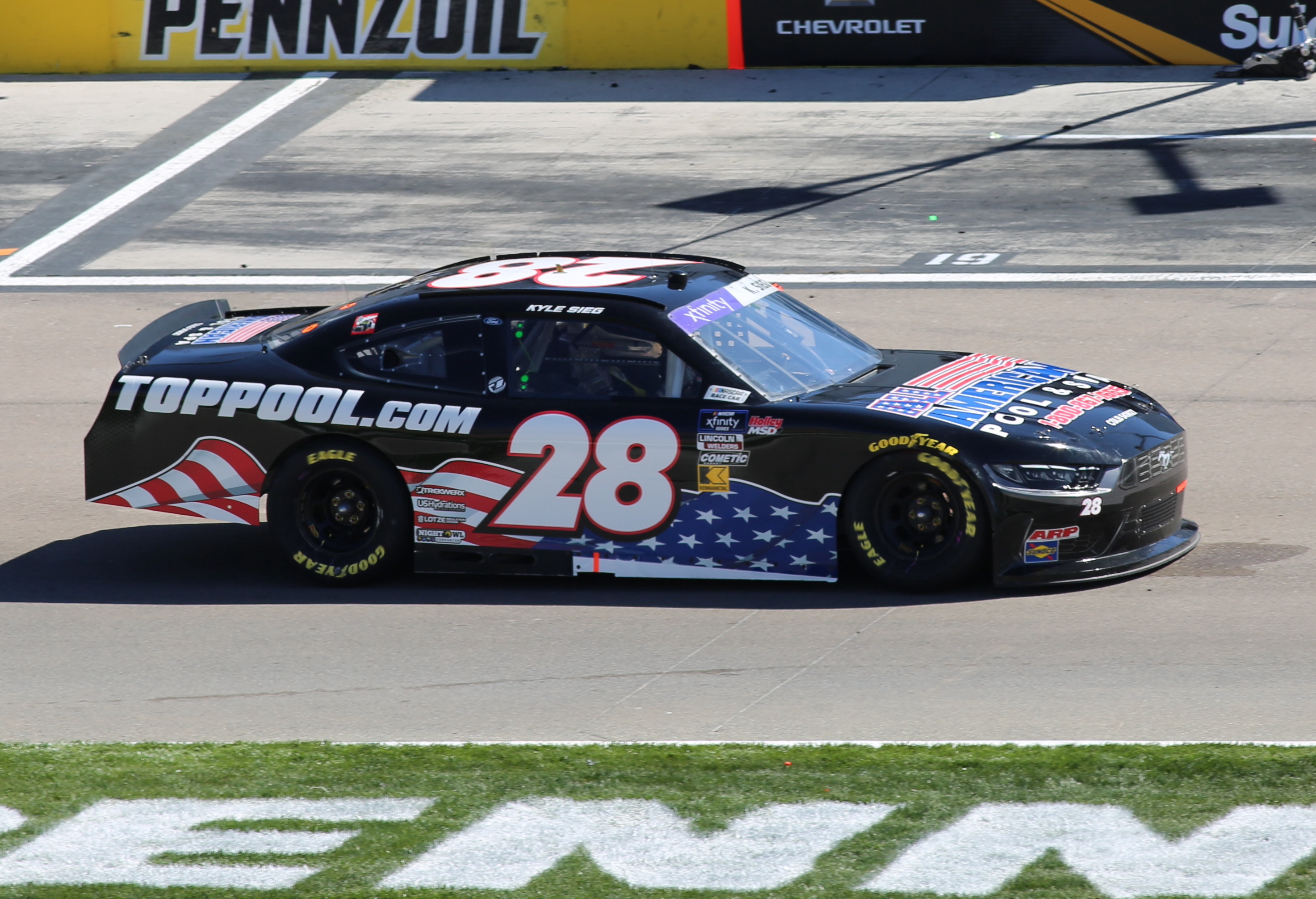
Sieg's No. 28 car at Las Vegas Motor Speedway in 2025

Sieg would continue to drive for the team in the No. 28 for 2025.

== Motorsports career results ==
=== Stock car career summary ===
Season	Series	Team	Races	Wins	Top 5	Top 10	Points	Position
2020	ARCA Menards Series	Cook-Finley Racing	3	0	0	1	94	36th
2020	ARCA Menards Series East	Cook-Finley Racing	2	0	0	0	60	29th
2021	NASCAR Xfinity Series	DGM Racing	1	0	0	0	13	65th
2021	NASCAR Xfinity Series	RSS Racing	1	0	0	0	13	65th
2021	ARCA Menards Series	RSS Racing	11	0	3	8	396	9th
2021	ARCA Menards Series East	RSS Racing	2	0	0	0	64	25th
2021	ARCA Menards Series West	RSS Racing	1	0	1	1	40	40th
2022	NASCAR Xfinity Series	RSS Racing	17	0	0	1	232	29th
2023	NASCAR Xfinity Series	RSS Racing	31	0	0	1	428	22nd
2024	NASCAR Xfinity Series	RSS Racing	31	0	0	1	418	24th
2025	NASCAR Xfinity Series	RSS Racing	32	0	0	1	467	25th
2025	NASCAR Xfinity Series	Joey Gase Motorsports with Scott Osteen	1	0	0	0	467	25th

=== NASCAR ===
(key) (Bold – Pole position awarded by qualifying time. Italics – Pole position earned by points standings or practice time. * – Most laps led.)

==== O'Reilly Auto Parts Series ====
NASCAR O'Reilly Auto Parts Series results
Year	Team	No.	Make	1	2	3	4	5	6	7	8	9	10	11	12	13	14	15	16	17	18	19	20	21	22	23	24	25	26	27	28	29	30	31	32	33	NOAPSC	Pts	Ref
2021	DGM Racing	90	Ford	DAY	DRC	HOM	LVS	PHO	ATL	MAR	TAL	DAR	DOV; 34	COA	CLT	MOH	TEX	NSH	POC	ROA	ATL	NHA	GLN	IRC	MCH	DAY	DAR	RCH	BRI	LVS	TAL	ROV	TEX	KAN	MAR		65th	13	
2021	RSS Racing	39	Ford																																	PHO; 27	65th	13	
2022	RSS Racing	28	Ford	DAY; 21	CAL; 18		PHO; 32	ATL; 24	COA	RCH; 37	MAR					CLT; DNQ	PIR							MCH; 21	GLN								LVS; 26	HOM; 35	MAR		29th	232	
2022	RSS Racing	38	Ford			LVS; 16								DAR; 32	TEX			NSH; 25	ROA	ATL; 16	NHA	POC; 22	IRC			DAY; 10	DAR; 23	KAN	BRI	TEX	TAL	ROV				PHO; 22	29th	232	
2022	RSS Racing	39	Ford									TAL; 18	DOV																								29th	232	
2023	RSS Racing	28	Ford	DAY; 21			PHO; 25	ATL; 26	COA; 26	RCH; 20	MAR; 35	TAL; 15	DOV; 29	DAR; 30	CLT; 11	PIR; 34	SON			ATL; 7	NHA; 23	POC; 16	ROA; 32	MCH; 19	IRC; 30	GLN; 19	DAY; 13	DAR; 35		BRI; 21		ROV; 32					22nd	428	
2023	RSS Racing	38	Ford		CAL; 15	LVS; 20																												HOM; 22		PHO; 38	22nd	428	
2023	RSS Racing	29	Ford															NSH; 25	CSC										KAN; 20		TEX; 12		LVS; 18		MAR; 38		22nd	428	
2024	RSS Racing	28	Ford	DAY; DNQ	ATL; 36	LVS; 20	PHO; 25	COA	RCH; 23	MAR; 23	TEX; 14	TAL; 13	DOV; 27	DAR; 32	CLT; 19	PIR; 18	SON; 22	IOW; 19	NHA; 31	NSH; 26	CSC; 22	POC; 20	IND; 22	MCH; 28	DAY; 15	DAR; 22	ATL; 16	GLN; 37	BRI; 23	KAN; 24	TAL; 10						24th	418	
2024	RSS Racing	39	Ford																													ROV; 23	LVS; 26	HOM; 26	MAR; 21	PHO; 29	24th	418	
2025	RSS Racing	28	Ford	DAY; 36	ATL; 33	COA; 27	PHO; 18	LVS; 11	HOM; 27	MAR; 35	DAR; 30	BRI; 22	CAR; 20	TAL; 23	TEX; 22	CLT; 33	NSH; 26	MXC; 28	POC; 25	ATL; 9	CSC; 20	SON; 25	DOV; 36	IND; 16	IOW; 18	GLN; 30	DAY; 27		GTW; 24	BRI; 21	KAN; 17	ROV; 33	LVS; 21	TAL; 15	MAR; 21		25th	467	
2025	Joey Gase Motorsports with Scott Osteen	53	Chevy																									PIR; 26									25th	467	
2025	RSS Racing	39	Ford																																	PHO; 12	25th	467	
2026	RSS Racing	28	Chevy	DAY; 15	ATL; 38	COA; 24	PHO; 24	LVS; 14	DAR; 37	MAR; 34	CAR; 37	BRI; 25	KAN; 25	TAL; 18	TEX; 30	GLN; 31	DOV; 17	CLT; 19	NSH; 24	POC; 32	COR; 37	SON; 31	CHI; 30	ATL; 8	IND; 24	IOW; 12	DAY; 21	DAR; 16	GTW; 9	BRI; 20	LVS; 20	CLT; 35	PHO; 25	TAL; 28	MAR; 21	HOM; 11	24th	436	

^{*} Season still in progress
^{1} Ineligible for series points

=== ARCA Menards Series ===
(key) (Bold – Pole position awarded by qualifying time. Italics – Pole position earned by points standings or practice time. * – Most laps led.)

ARCA Menards Series results
Year	Team	No.	Make	1	2	3	4	5	6	7	8	9	10	11	12	13	14	15	16	17	18	19	20	AMSC	Pts	Ref
2020	Cook-Finley Racing	42	Chevy	DAY	PHO	TAL	POC	IRP; 10	KEN	IOW	KAN	TOL	TOL	MCH	DRC									36th	94	
2020	Cook-Finley Racing	41	Chevy													GTW; 11	L44	TOL	BRI; 17	WIN	MEM	ISF	KAN	36th	94	
2021	RSS Racing	28	Chevy	DAY; 5	PHO; 4	TAL; 8	KAN; 8	TOL	CLT; 12	MOH; 10	POC; 6	ELK	BLN	IOW	WIN	GLN; 12	MCH; 5	ISF	MLW	DSF	BRI; 11	SLM	KAN; 7	9th	396	

==== ARCA Menards Series East ====
ARCA Menards Series East results
Year	Team	No.	Make	1	2	3	4	5	6	7	8	AMSEC	Pts	Ref
2020	Cook-Finley Racing	41	Chevy	NSM	TOL	DOV; 11	TOL	BRI; 17	FIF			29th	60	
2021	RSS Racing	28	Chevy	NSM	FIF	NSV	DOV; 13	SNM	IOW	MLW	BRI; 11	25th	64	

==== ARCA Menards Series West ====
ARCA Menards Series West results
Year	Team	No.	Make	1	2	3	4	5	6	7	8	9	10	11	12	AMSWC	Pts	Ref
2021	RSS Racing	28	Chevy	PHO; 4	SON	IRW	CNS	IRW	PIR	LVS	AAS	PHO				40th	40	
2023	Lowden Jackson Motorsports	46	Ford	PHO	IRW	KCR	PIR; 17	SON	IRW	SHA	EVG	AAS	LVS	MAD	PHO	55th	27	
