= 2021 General Tire 150 (Charlotte) =

Race details
- Race 6 of 20 of the 2021 ARCA Menards Series
- Date: May 29, 2021
- Official name: General Tire 150
- Location: Concord, North Carolina, Charlotte Motor Speedway
- Course: Permanent racing facility
- Course length: 2.41 km (1.5 miles)
- Distance: 100 laps, 150 mi (241.402 km)
- Scheduled distance: 100 laps, 150 mi (241.402 km)
- Average speed: 115.656 miles per hour (186.130 km/h)

Pole position
Driver	Ty Gibbs	Joe Gibbs Racing
- Time: 29.952

Most laps led
Driver	Ty Gibbs	Joe Gibbs Racing
- Laps: 100

Winner
No. 18	Ty Gibbs	Joe Gibbs Racing

Television in the United States
- Network: Fox Sports 1
- Announcers: Jamie Little, Phil Parsons, Matt DiBenedetto

Radio in the United States
- Radio: Motor Racing Network

The 2021 General Tire 150 was the sixth stock car race of the 2021 ARCA Menards Series season and the 12th iteration of the event. The race was held on Saturday, May 29, 2021 in Concord, North Carolina at Charlotte Motor Speedway, a 1.5 miles (2.4 km) permanent quad-oval. The race took the scheduled 100 laps to complete. At race's end, Ty Gibbs of Joe Gibbs Racing would dominate, leading every lap to win his 12th career ARCA Menards Series win, his fourth of the season, and his third straight win.

== Background ==
The layout of Charlotte Motor Speedway, the venue where the race was held.

The race was held at Charlotte Motor Speedway, located in Concord, North Carolina. The speedway complex includes a 1.5-mile (2.4 km) quad-oval track that was utilized for the race, as well as a dragstrip and a dirt track. The speedway was built in 1959 by Bruton Smith and is considered the home track for NASCAR with many race teams based in the Charlotte metropolitan area. The track is owned and operated by Speedway Motorsports Inc. (SMI) with Marcus G. Smith serving as track president.

=== Entry list ===
#	Driver	Team	Make	Sponsor
01	Owen Smith	Fast Track Racing	Ford	Academy Mortgage
2	Nick Sanchez	Rev Racing	Chevrolet	Honda Generators, Max Siegel Inc.
02	Toni Breidinger	Young's Motorsports	Chevrolet	HairClub
06	Con Nicolopoulos*	Wayne Peterson Racing	Chevrolet	Great Railing
10	Jason Miles	Fast Track Racing	Chevrolet	Andolina Materials, Pinnacle Green Landscaping & Hardscapes
11	Tony Cosentino	Fast Track Racing	Toyota	The Brews Box
12	D. L. Wilson	Fast Track Racing	Toyota	SGT Jack Reynolds USAF 56'
15	Drew Dollar	Venturini Motorsports	Toyota	Sunbelt Rentals
18	Ty Gibbs	Joe Gibbs Racing	Toyota	Joe Gibbs Racing
20	Corey Heim	Venturini Motorsports	Toyota	JBL
21	Jack Wood	GMS Racing	Chevrolet	Chevrolet Accessories
25	Parker Chase	Venturini Motorsports	Toyota	Eagle Marine, NXTLVL Marine
27	Tim Richmond	Richmond Clubb Motorsports	Chevrolet	Richmond Clubb Motorsports
28	Kyle Sieg	RSS Racing	Chevrolet	Eastern Fuel Systems, Night Owl Contractors
30	Max Gutiérrez	Rette Jones Racing	Ford	ToughBuilt, In Honor of Our Beloved Parents: The Sabates Family
35	Greg Van Alst	Greg Van Alst Motorsports	Chevrolet	CB Fabricating
40	?*	Niece Motorsports	Chevrolet	The Ticket Clinic
46	Thad Moffitt	David Gilliland Racing	Ford	Aqua ChemPacs, CleanPacs
48	Brad Smith	Brad Smith Motorsports	Chevrolet	Henshaw Automation
50	?	Niece Motorsports	Chevrolet	Hype Motorsports
63	Dave Mader III	Spraker Racing Enterprises	Chevrolet	American Apparel, Diamond C Ranch
69	Scott Melton	Kimmel Racing	Toyota	Melton-McFadden Insurance Agency
73	Andy Jankowiak	Jankowiak Motorsports	Ford	V1 Fiber Patriotic
87	Chuck Buchanan Jr.	Charles Buchanan Racing	Ford	Spring Drug
94	Chris Hacker	Cram Racing Enterprises	Toyota	United Brachial Plexus Network
97	Jason Kitzmiller	CR7 Motorsports	Chevrolet	A. L. L. Construction
Official entry list

*Withdrew.

== Qualifying ==
Qualifying would take place on Saturday, May 29, at 4:30 PM EST. The qualifying system was a 45 minute session where drivers could run as many laps as they wanted within the session to set a time. Ty Gibbs of Joe Gibbs Racing would win the pole, setting a time of 29.952 and an average speed of 180.288 miles per hour (290.145 km/h) in the closing minutes.

=== Full qualifying results ===
Pos.	#	Driver	Team	Make	Time	Speed
1	18	Ty Gibbs	Joe Gibbs Racing	Toyota	29.952	180.288
2	25	Parker Chase	Venturini Motorsports	Toyota	30.517	176.951
3	46	Thad Moffitt	David Gilliland Racing	Ford	30.857	175.001
4	21	Jack Wood	GMS Racing	Chevrolet	30.938	174.543
5	2	Nick Sanchez	Rev Racing	Chevrolet	31.018	174.092
6	35	Greg Van Alst	Greg Van Alst Motorsports	Chevrolet	31.037	173.986
7	15	Drew Dollar	Venturini Motorsports	Toyota	31.043	173.952
8	73	Andy Jankowiak	Jankowiak Motorsports	Ford	31.529	171.271
9	20	Corey Heim	Venturini Motorsports	Toyota	31.573	171.032
10	27	Tim Richmond	Richmond Clubb Motorsports	Chevrolet	31.913	169.210
11	63	Dave Mader III	Spraker Racing Enterprises	Chevrolet	32.089	168.282
12	94	Chris Hacker	Cram Racing Enterprises	Toyota	32.110	168.172
13	30	Max Gutiérrez	Rette Jones Racing	Ford	32.147	167.978
14	97	Jason Kitzmiller	CR7 Motorsports	Chevrolet	32.495	166.179
15	69	Scott Melton	Kimmel Racing	Toyota	32.604	165.624
16	28	Kyle Sieg	RSS Racing	Chevrolet	32.789	164.689
17	02	Toni Breidinger	Young's Motorsports	Chevrolet	33.994	158.852
18	01	Owen Smith	Fast Track Racing	Ford	34.326	157.315
19	11	Tony Cosentino	Fast Track Racing	Toyota	34.397	156.990
20	12	D. L. Wilson	Fast Track Racing	Toyota	34.603	156.056
21	10	Jason Miles	Fast Track Racing	Chevrolet	34.797	155.186
22	87	Chuck Buchanan Jr.	Charles Buchanan Racing	Ford	36.114	149.526
23	48	Brad Smith	Brad Smith Motorsports	Chevrolet	36.261	148.920
Withdrew
WD	06	Con Nicolopoulos	Wayne Peterson Racing	Chevrolet	—	—
WD	40	?	Niece Motorsports	Chevrolet	—	—
WD	50	?	Niece Motorsports	Chevrolet	—	—
Official qualifying results

== Race results ==
Fin	St	#	Driver	Team	Make	Laps	Led	Status	Pts
1	1	18	Ty Gibbs	Joe Gibbs Racing	Toyota	100	100	running	49
2	9	20	Corey Heim	Venturini Motorsports	Toyota	100	0	running	42
3	7	15	Drew Dollar	Venturini Motorsports	Toyota	100	0	running	41
4	2	25	Parker Chase	Venturini Motorsports	Toyota	100	0	running	40
5	5	2	Nick Sanchez	Rev Racing	Chevrolet	100	0	running	39
6	4	21	Jack Wood	GMS Racing	Chevrolet	100	0	running	38
7	3	46	Thad Moffitt	David Gilliland Racing	Ford	100	0	running	37
8	11	63	Dave Mader III	Spraker Racing Enterprises	Chevrolet	100	0	running	36
9	8	73	Andy Jankowiak	Jankowiak Motorsports	Ford	100	0	running	35
10	12	94	Chris Hacker	Cram Racing Enterprises	Toyota	100	0	running	34
11	14	97	Jason Kitzmiller	CR7 Motorsports	Chevrolet	99	0	running	33
12	16	28	Kyle Sieg	RSS Racing	Chevrolet	99	0	running	32
13	10	27	Tim Richmond	Richmond Clubb Motorsports	Chevrolet	98	0	running	31
14	6	35	Greg Van Alst	Greg Van Alst Motorsports	Chevrolet	98	0	running	30
15	13	30	Max Gutiérrez	Rette Jones Racing	Ford	97	0	running	29
16	15	69	Scott Melton	Kimmel Racing	Toyota	97	0	running	28
17	18	01	Owen Smith	Fast Track Racing	Ford	94	0	running	27
18	22	87	Chuck Buchanan Jr.	Charles Buchanan Racing	Ford	92	0	running	26
19	23	48	Brad Smith	Brad Smith Motorsports	Chevrolet	90	0	running	25
20	17	02	Toni Breidinger	Young's Motorsports	Chevrolet	89	0	running	24
21	21	10	Jason Miles	Fast Track Racing	Chevrolet	85	0	accident	23
22	19	11	Tony Cosentino	Fast Track Racing	Toyota	11	0	handling	22
23	20	12	D. L. Wilson	Fast Track Racing	Toyota	0	0	engine	21
Withdrew
WD		06	Con Nicolopoulos	Wayne Peterson Racing	Chevrolet				
WD		40	?	Niece Motorsports	Chevrolet				
WD		50	?	Niece Motorsports	Chevrolet				
Official race results

Previous race: 2021 Herr's Potato Chips 200	ARCA Menards Series; 2021 season	Next race: 2021 Dawn 150
