= Joe Gibbs Racing =

NASCAR racing team

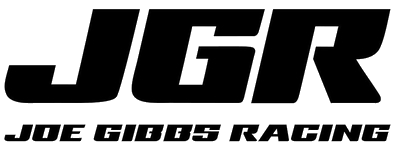
- Owners: Joe Gibbs; Heather Gibbs; Ty Gibbs (Note: O'Reilly only); Harris Blitzer Sports & Entertainment (Note: Josh Harris and David Blitzer); Arctos Partners
- Principal: Dave Alpern (President)
- Base: Huntersville, North Carolina
- Series: NASCAR Cup Series; NASCAR O'Reilly Auto Parts Series
- Race drivers: Cup Series: 11. Denny Hamlin; 19. Chase Briscoe; 20. Christopher Bell; 54. Ty Gibbs; O'Reilly Auto Parts Series: 18. William Sawalich; 19. Brent Crews; 20. Brandon Jones; 54. Taylor Gray
- Manufacturer: Chevrolet (1992–1996, 2003–2007), Pontiac (1997–2002), Toyota (2008–Present)
- Opened: 1992
- Website: joegibbsracing.com

Career
- Debut: Cup Series: 1992 Daytona 500 (Daytona); O'Reilly Auto Parts Series: 1997 All Pro Bumper To Bumper 300 (Charlotte); Truck Series: 2000 NAPA 250 (Martinsville); ARCA Menards Series: 1999 Georgia Boot 400 (Atlanta)
- Latest race: Cup Series: 2026 Season Finale 400 (Homestead) O'Reilly Auto Parts Series: 2026 O'Reilly Auto Parts 300 (Homestead) Truck Series: 2002 Ford 200 (Homestead); ARCA Menards Series: 2026 Menards 150 (Kansas)
- Races competed: Total: 2,396; Cup Series: 1,209; O'Reilly Auto Parts Series: 940; Truck Series: 60; ARCA Menards Series: 187
- Drivers' Championships: Total: 10; NASCAR Cup Series: 5; 2000, 2002, 2005, 2015, 2019; O'Reilly Auto Parts Series: 4; 2009, 2016, 2021, 2022; Truck Series: 0 ARCA Menards Series: 1; 2021
- Race victories: Total: 515; Cup Series: 237; O'Reilly Auto Parts Series: 225; Truck Series: 0 ARCA Menards Series: 53
- Pole positions: Total: 427; Cup Series: 177; O'Reilly Auto Parts Series: 202; Truck Series: 0 ARCA Menards Series: 48

Joe Gibbs Racing (JGR) is an American professional stock car racing organization founded by Pro Football Hall of Fame coach Joe Gibbs. His son, J. D. Gibbs, ran the team with him until his death in 2019. Founded in Huntersville, North Carolina, in 1992, JGR has won five Cup Series championships, four O'Reilly Auto Parts Series championships and one ARCA Series championship.

For the team's first 16 seasons, Joe Gibbs Racing ran cars from General Motors, winning three championships: two in Pontiac Grand Prixs and one in a Chevrolet Monte Carlo. The team switched to Toyota beginning in the 2008 season, and in 2015 brought Toyota their first Premier series championship with Kyle Busch's victory.

The team fields four full-time entries in the NASCAR Cup Series: the No. 11 Toyota Camry for Denny Hamlin, the No. 19 Camry for Chase Briscoe, the No. 20 Camry for Christopher Bell, and the No. 54 Camry for Ty Gibbs. In the O'Reilly Auto Parts Series, the team fields four full-time entries: the No. 18 Toyota GR Supra for William Sawalich, the No. 19 Supra for Brent Crews, the No. 20 Supra for Brandon Jones, and the No. 54 Supra for Taylor Gray.

The team has a driver development program that groomed future Cup winners Joey Logano and Aric Almirola and won one championship in the Camping World East Series (now known as the ARCA Menards East Series) with Logano. The team won the 2021 ARCA Menards Series championship with Ty Gibbs. The organization teamed up with former NFL player Reggie White in 2004 to create a diversity program, fielding drivers such as Almirola, Marc Davis, and Bubba Wallace, and forming the basis for NASCAR's Drive for Diversity program.

JGR formed a technical alliance with 23XI Racing in 2021 and sold minority stakes to Harris Blitzer Sports & Entertainment (HBSE) and Arctos Partners in 2023.

== History ==
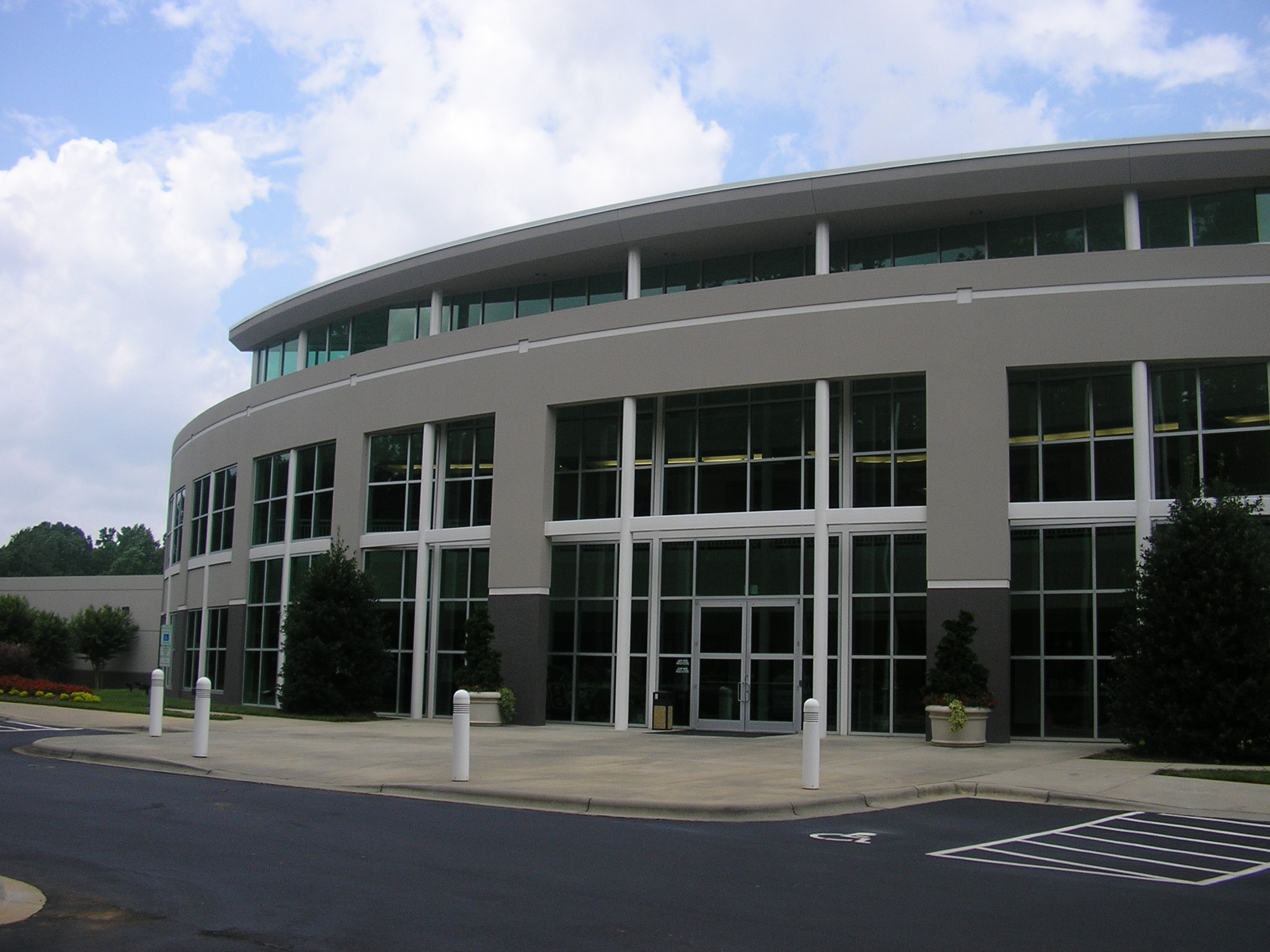
The team's headquarters.

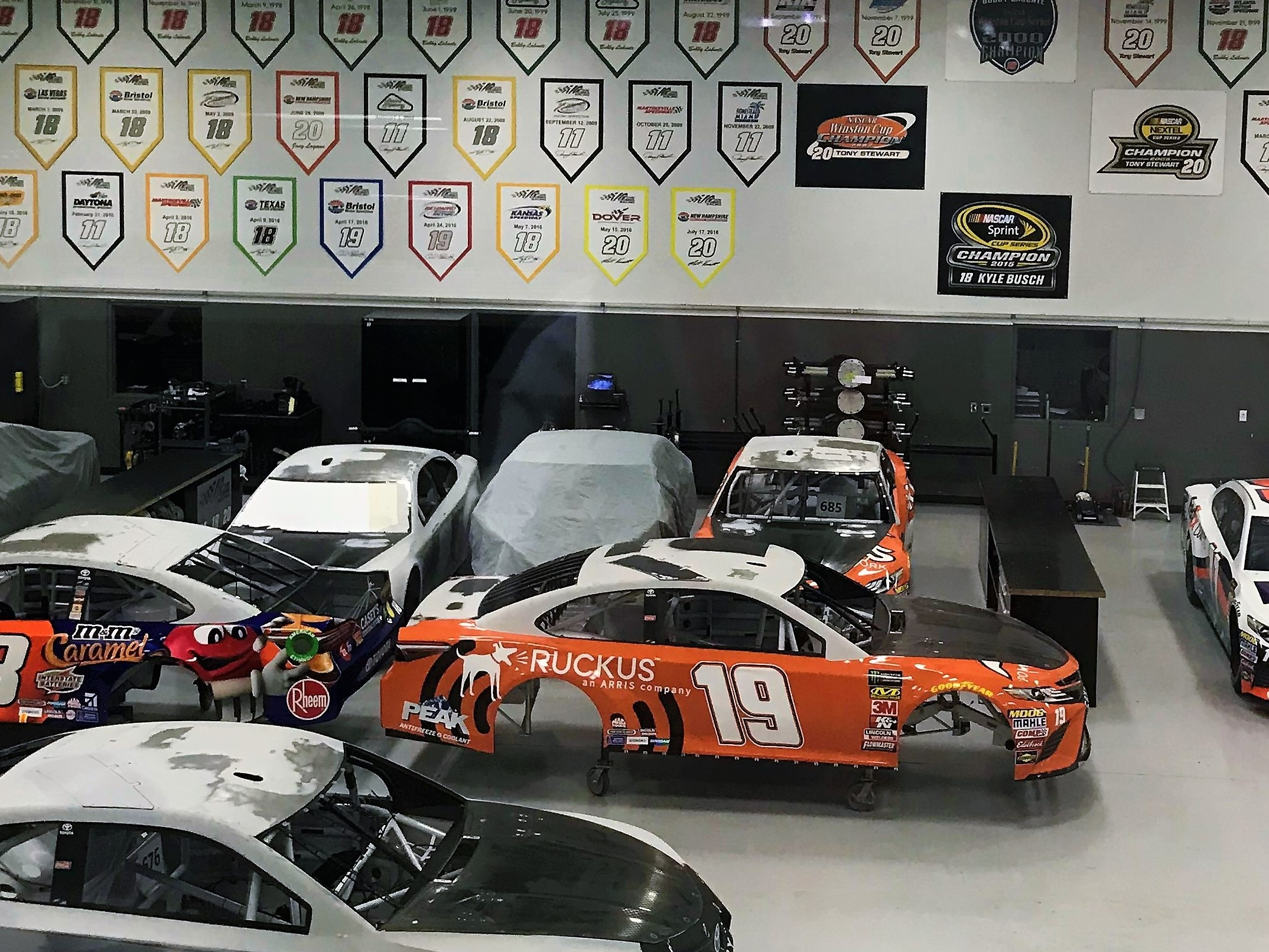
Monster Energy NASCAR Cup Series cars being prepared in 2018.

Gibbs founded the team in 1991 after exploring opportunities with Don Meredith, who currently serves as the team's Executive Vice President. In 1997, Gibbs' son J. D. Gibbs was named team president. In 1998, the team began building its facility in Huntersville, North Carolina. The team expanded to a two-car operation in 1999 with Tony Stewart's No. 20 Home Depot-sponsored car, then in 2005 added the No. 11 FedEx-sponsored car driven by Denny Hamlin and owned by Coy Gibbs. For the 2015 season, the team added the No. 19 car driven by Carl Edwards, who followed former Roush Racing teammate Matt Kenseth to JGR.

After winning three Cup championships and more than 70 NASCAR races in Chevrolet and Pontiac equipment, team officials announced in September 2007 that they would switch to Toyota (who had just entered the Cup series that year) after their contract with General Motors ended at the end of the season. Joe Gibbs said Toyota offered the team resources and options they "were not going to be able to afford to do" if they remained at GM. It was also reported that JGR executives felt they were treated by GM as less important than other GM teams such as Hendrick Motorsports and Richard Childress Racing.

In 2012, JGR shuttered its in-house Sprint Cup Series engine program, merging with California-based Toyota Racing Development which provides engines to JGR and 23XI Racing. The team builds engines for its own Xfinity Series operations and ARCA Menards Series operations of Venturini Motorsports. The team had a technical alliance with Furniture Row Racing, a single-car team based in Denver, Colorado, which closed after the 2018 season. In June 2023, JGR sold minority stakes to Harris Blitzer Sports & Entertainment (HBSE), founded and managed by Josh Harris and David Blitzer, and Arctos Partners. Gibbs became a limited partner of HBSE in the transaction.

In 2026, JGR shuttered its ARCA Menards Series program, with winning in their final start at Phoenix.

== NASCAR Craftsman Truck Series ==
From 2000 to 2002, Joe Gibbs fielded trucks numbered 20 and 48 in the Craftsman Truck Series for his sons Coy and J. D. Gibbs. Coy ran 12 races in 2000, then the full 2001 and 2002 seasons, with 21 top-tens and tenth-place points finishes in the latter two seasons. J. D. only ran a total of eight races over the three seasons, with no top 10 finishes.

From 2004 to 2006, JGR drivers drove in the Truck Series for Chevrolet-affiliated Morgan-Dollar Motorsports, fielding Bobby Labonte, Tony Stewart, Denny Hamlin, J. J. Yeley, Jason Leffler, and Aric Almirola in select races. In 2006, JGR contracted Spears Motorsports to field Almirola in their 75 truck for his rookie Truck season. Almirola had three top-tens (compared to two top-tens in four starts the previous year), finishing 18th in points.

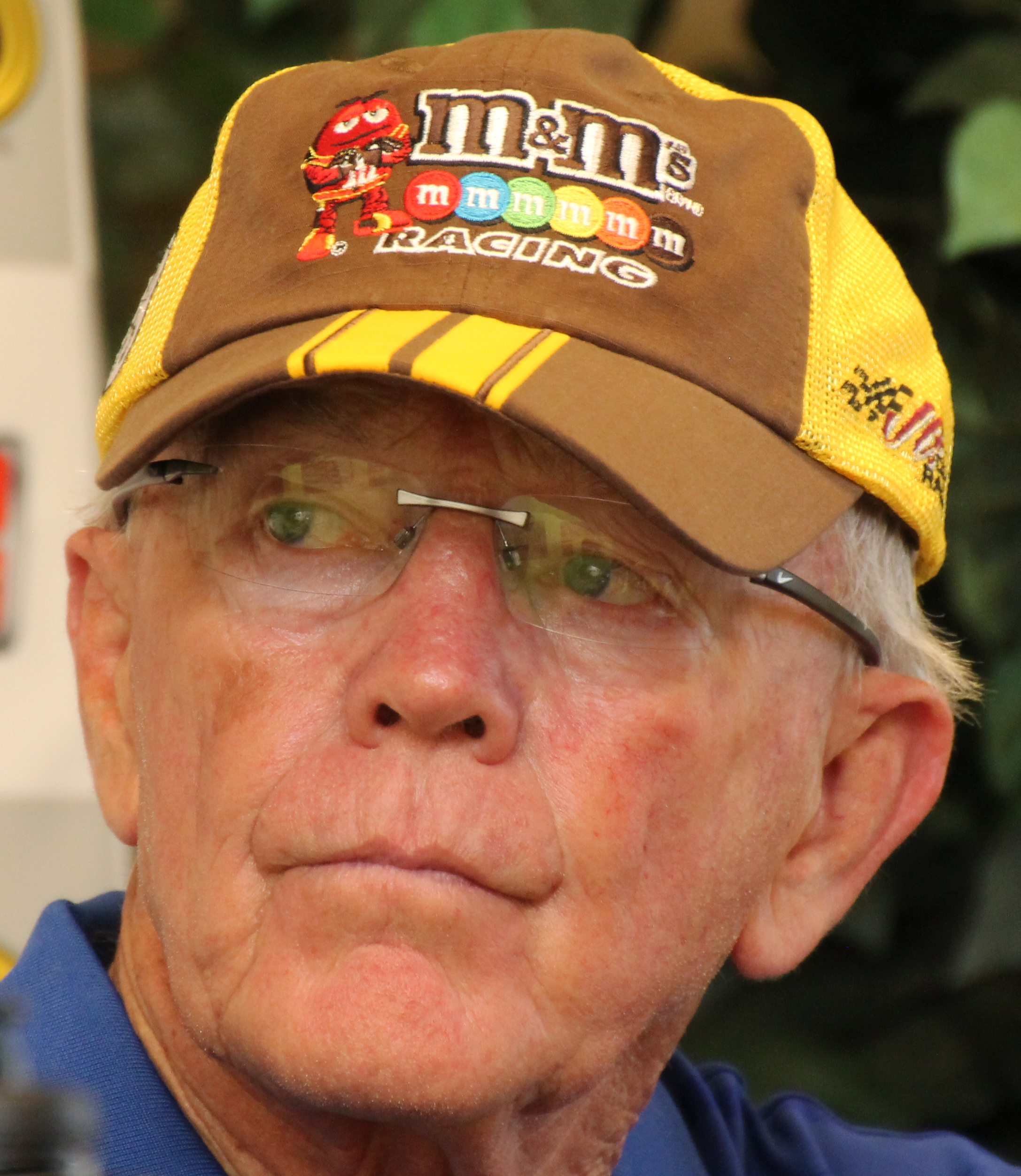
Gibbs after Kyle Busch won the 2015 Toyota/Save Mart 350

From 2010 through 2022, JGR drivers competed in the Truck Series through Kyle Busch Motorsports, owned by Cup Series driver Kyle Busch. KBM used JGR-built engines in competition. The partnership ended following the 2022 season when Busch left the organization.

=== Truck No. 20 history ===
In 2000 JGR made their debut in the Craftsman Truck Series, fielding of the No. 20 Chevrolet with Coy Gibbs and his brother J. D. sharing the driving duties. In 2001, he began racing a full-time schedule, posting two top-five finishes, and finishing tenth in points both in 2001 and 2002.

==== Truck No. 20 results ====
Year	Driver	No.	Make	1	2	3	4	5	6	7	8	9	10	11	12	13	14	15	16	17	18	19	20	21	22	23	24	Owners	Pts
2000	Coy Gibbs	20	Chevy	DAY	HOM	PHO	MMR	MAR; 18	PIR	GTY; 32		PPR; 19	EVG	TEX	KEN; 19		MLW; 28	NHA; 16	NZH; 24		IRP; DNQ		CIC; 13	RCH; DNQ		TEX; 34	CAL; 29		
2000	J. D. Gibbs	20	Chevy								MEM; 28					GLN; 31				MCH; 30		NSV; 24			DOV; 26				
2001	Coy Gibbs	20	Chevy	DAY; 7	HOM; 11	MMR; 13	MAR; DNQ	GTY; 22	DAR; 15	PPR; 31	DOV; 5	TEX; 7	MEM; 5	MLW; 13	KAN; 9	KEN; 19	NHA; 14	IRP; 13	NSH; 10	CIC; 23	NZH; 20	RCH; 18	SBO; 12	TEX; 7	LVS; 12	PHO; 31	CAL; 14		
2002	Coy Gibbs	20	Chevy	DAY; 28	DAR; 23	MAR; 21	GTY; 22	PPR; 9	DOV; 6	TEX; 8	MEM; 8	MLW; 3	KAN; 3	KEN; 7	NHA; 6	MCH; 7	IRP; 18	NSH; 12	RCH; 6	TEX; 2	SBO; 4	LVS; 15	CAL; 6	PHO; 6	HOM; 12				

=== Truck No. 48 history ===
In 2000, JGR fielded the No. 48 Chevrolet part-time with Coy Gibbs and J. D. Gibbs sharing the driving duties.

In 2001 and 2002, J. D. continued to drive the No. 48 on part-time basis.

==== Truck No. 48 results ====
Year	Driver	No.	Make	1	2	3	4	5	6	7	8	9	10	11	12	13	14	15	16	17	18	19	20	21	22	23	24	Owners	Pts
2000	Coy Gibbs	48	Chevy	DAY	HOM	PHO	MMR	MAR	PIR	GTY	MEM	PPR	EVG	TEX	KEN	GLN	MLW	NHA	NZH	MCH	IRP	NSV; 16	CIC						
2000	J. D. Gibbs	48	Chevy																					RCH; DNQ	DOV	TEX	CAL		
2001	J. D. Gibbs	48	Chevy	DAY	HOM	MMR	MAR	GTY	DAR; 23	PPR	DOV	TEX	MEM	MLW	KAN	KEN	NHA	IRP	NSH	CIC	NZH	RCH; 36	SBO	TEX	LVS	PHO	CAL		
2002	J. D. Gibbs	48	Chevy	DAY	DAR; 31	MAR	GTY	PPR	DOV	TEX	MEM	MLW	KAN	KEN	NHA	MCH	IRP	NSH	RCH	TEX	SBO	LVS	CAL	PHO	HOM				

== ARCA ==
=== Car No. 2 history ===
From 2004 to 2005, Joe Gibbs Racing partnered with Shaver Motorsports to field the No. 2 car for development drivers in the ARCA Racing Series. Denny Hamlin finished third in the 2004 season finale at Talladega. J. J. Yeley ran the 2005 season opener at Daytona, as part of his development deal with JGR. Aric Almirola ran the 2005 finale at Talladega.

==== Car No. 2 results ====
Year	Driver	No.	Make	1	2	3	4	5	6	7	8	9	10	11	12	13	14	15	16	17	18	19	20	21	22	23	Owners	Pts
2005	J. J. Yeley	2	Chevy	DAY; 3																								
2005	Denny Hamlin	2	Pontiac		NSH; 36	SLM	KEN	TOL	LAN	MIL	POC	MCH	KAN	KEN	BLN	POC	GTW	LER	NSH	MCH	ISF	TOL	DSF	CHI	SLM			
2005	Aric Almirola	2	Chevy																							TAL; 37		

=== Car No. 18 history ===
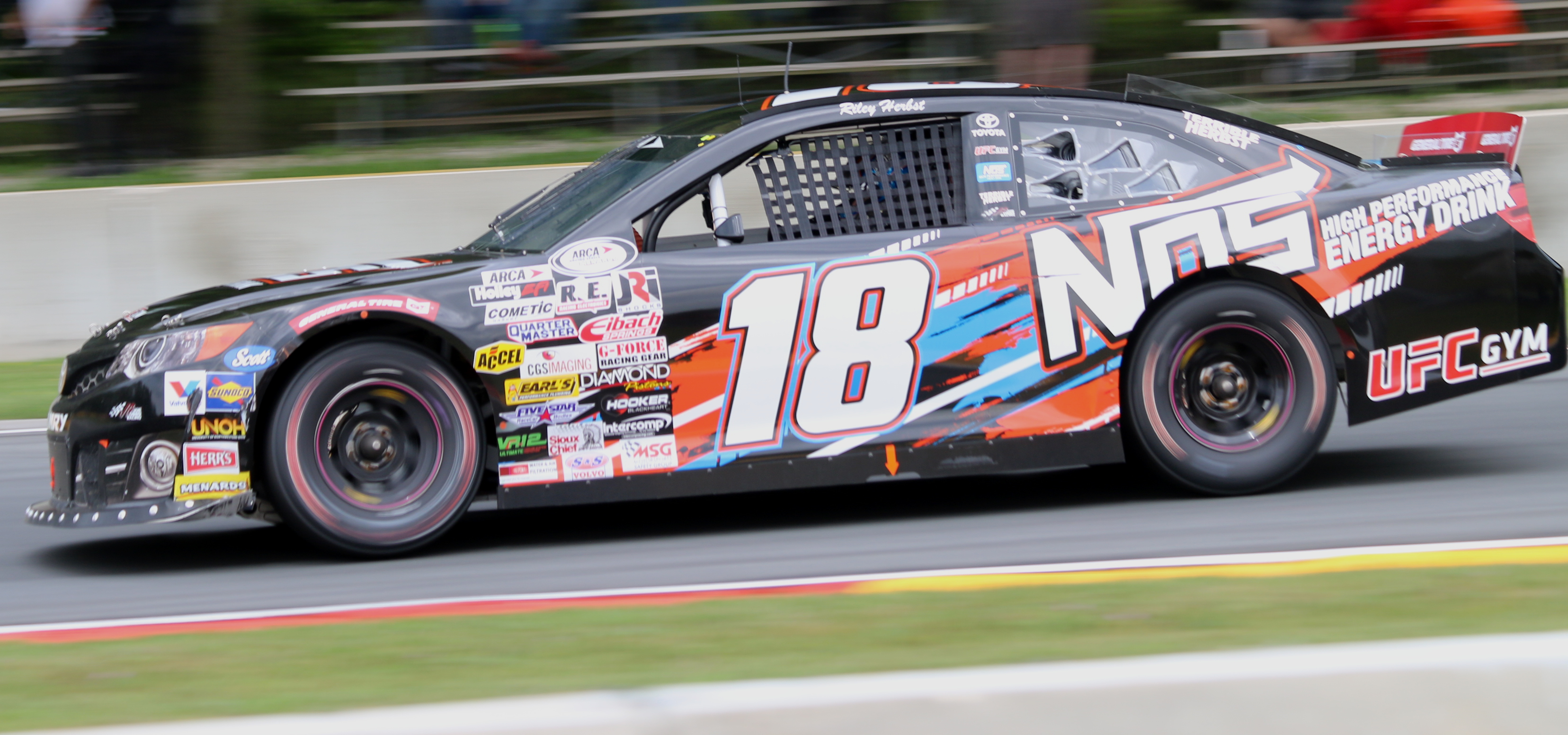
Riley Herbst in 2017

In 1999, Joe Gibbs Racing fielded the No. 18 car for Jason Leffler for one race. Leffler finished fifth at Atlanta.

In 2000, Leffler returned at Charlotte, he started second and led one lap, however, he crashed with 55 of 67 laps completed.

In 2010, Joe Gibbs Racing entered the No. 18 at Michigan for Max Gresham which was also entered again as Brennan Poole due to Gresham having a contractual obligation for another team that day of the race although the team would later withdraw their entry from the race entirely.

On December 15, 2016, it was announced that JGR would field a car for Riley Herbst full-time in the 2017 season. Matt Tifft ran the season opener at Daytona due to Herbst not being eligible to compete in the race.

In 2018, Herbst returned for another full-time season. In 2019, Herbst drove the No. 18 for eight races, while Ty Gibbs drove for 11 races, winning at Gateway and Salem. Todd Gilliland drove one race at Pocono.

In 2020, Gibbs ran 16 races, winning six times, while Herbst ran the other four races. Despite missing four races, Gibbs finished fifth in the driver's standings. Gibbs also raced in the ARCA East series, winning at Toledo and finishing second in the standings of the six-race season. Gibbs ran full-time in 2021, winning ten of the 20 races and finishing in the top-three 17 times en route to the series championship. Gibbs also ran a standalone ARCA West event at Phoenix in March and a standalone ARCA East event at Dover in May, winning both races. For 2022, the No. 18 was fielded by Kyle Busch Motorsports.

In 2023, the car returned to JGR, with Connor Mosack driving six races and William Sawalich driving 13 races.

During the 2024 season, the No. 18 was shared between Sawalich and Tanner Gray. Sawalich scored three wins and seven top-three finishes.

In 2025, Max Reaves, son of Jeremy Reaves, who is the co-owner of Cook Out, and franchise founder Morris Reaves would drive part-time for the 18. On January 8, JGR announced that Brent Crews would drive the No. 18 part-time in all 3 ARCA Series in 2025. That year, he won the ARCA and ARCA West combination race at Phoenix, the ARCA and ARCA East combination race at IRP, Springfield, the ARCA and ARCA East combination race at Bristol. Sawalich would run four races in the No. 18 car. Gio Ruggiero running two races in the No. 18 car. He ran at Michigan and the Kansas fall race, earning a second-place finish in the Kansas event.

Ruggiero will return to No. 18 car in 2026, running six races at tracks 1.5 miles (2.4 km) and longer, since the anchor driver of the car, Max Reaves, will be ineligible to race due to his age. Ruggiero won at Daytona, Kansas, a rain-shortened race at Michigan, and Pocono. Reaves won at Berlin, Elko, Springfield, and Salem. Sawalich would drive the No. 18 at Chicagoland.

==== Car No. 18 results ====
Year	Driver	No.	Make	1	2	3	4	5	6	7	8	9	10	11	12	13	14	15	16	17	18	19	20	21	Owners	Pts
1999	Jason Leffler	18	Pontiac	DAY	ATL	SLM	AND	CLT	MCH	POC	TOL	SBS	BLN	POC	KIL	FRS	FLM	ISF	WIN	DSF	SLM	CLT	TAL	ATL; 5	87th	205
2000	Jason Leffler	18	Pontiac	DAY	SLM	AND	CLT	KIL	FRS	MCH	POC	TOL	KEN	BLN	POC	WIN	ISF	KEN	DSF	SLM	CLT; 31	TAL	ATL		124th	100
2017	Matt Tifft	18	Toyota	DAY; 12																					5th	4555
2017	Riley Herbst	18	Toyota		NSH; 7	SLM; 12	TAL; 8	TOL; 5	ELK; 3*	POC; 1*	MCH; 16	MAD; 3	IOW; 12	IRP; 13	POC; 2	WIN; 17	ISF; 16	ROA; 2	DSF; 16	SLM; 17	CHI; 13	KEN; 7	KAN; 9		5th	4555
2018	Riley Herbst	18	Toyota	DAY; 10	NSH; 13	SLM; 6	TAL; 17	TOL; 19	CLT; 2	POC; 5	MCH; 2	MAD; 13	GTW; 5	CHI; 6	IOW; 17	ELK; 4	POC; 5	ISF; 9	BLN; 9	DSF; 3	SLM; 9	IRP; 8	KAN; 4		3rd	4595
2019	Riley Herbst	18	Toyota	DAY; 10			TAL; 2			CLT; 19	POC; 2*	MCH; 12			CHI; 6					DSF; 6			KAN; 16		16th	1485
2019	Ty Gibbs	18	Toyota		FIF; 2	SLM; 6		NSH; 2	TOL; 2				MAD; 8	GTW; 1		ELK; 2	IOW; 5		ISF; 15		SLM; 1*	IRP; 15*			13th	2315
2019	Todd Gilliland	18	Toyota															POC; 2*							–	–
2020	Riley Herbst	18	Toyota	DAY; 7		TAL; 4					KAN; 3			MCH; 1											1st	1411
2020	Ty Gibbs	18	Toyota		PHO; 3*		POC; 1*	IRP; 15	KEN; 1*	IOW; 1*		TOL; 2	TOL; 10*		DRC; 2	GTW; 1*	L44; 4	TOL; 3	BRI; 2	WIN; 1*	MEM; 1	ISF; 10	KAN; 14		1st	1411
2021	Ty Gibbs	18	Toyota	DAY; 4	PHO; 1*	TAL; 27	KAN; 1**	TOL; 1*	CLT; 1**	MOH; 1*	POC; 2	ELK; 4*	BLN; 2*	IOW; 1*	WIN; 1	GLN; 3	MCH; 1*	ISF; 2	MLW; 1**	DSF; 2	BRI; 1*	SLM; 2*	KAN; 2*		1st	997
2023	Connor Mosack	18	Toyota	DAY; 2*			KAN; 4	CLT; 9					POC; 2	MCH; 3						KAN; 1*					2nd	1046
2023	William Sawalich	18	Toyota		PHO; 13*				BLN; 1	ELK; 2	MOH; 2	IOW; 2*			IRP; 4	GLN; 4	ISF; 5	MLW; 1*	DSF; 5		BRI; 1	SLM; 6	TOL; 1*		2nd	1046
2023	Taylor Gray	18	Toyota			TAL; 7																			2nd	1046
2024	Tanner Gray	18	Toyota	DAY; 24		TAL; 3		KAN; 2*	CLT; 1							MCH; 3*						KAN; 1*			1st	1084
2024	William Sawalich	18	Toyota		PHO; 1*		DOV; 17*			IOW; 2	MOH; 1	BLN; 1*	IRP; 3	SLM; 1**	ELK; 1*		ISF; 1**	MLW; 1*	DSF; 2	GLN; 2	BRI; 1*		TOL; 1*		1st	1084
2025	William Sawalich	18	Toyota	DAY; 2*		TAL; 9	KAN; 2	CLT; 4																	2nd	1018
2025	Brent Crews	18	Toyota		PHO; 1							LRP; 6	DOV; 21	IRP; 1	IOW; 2	GLN; 9*				BRI; 1**					2nd	1018
2025	Gio Ruggiero	18	Toyota						MCH; 4													KAN; 2*			2nd	1018
2025	Max Reaves	18	Toyota							BER; 2	ELK; 1						ISF; 6	MAD; 1*	DSF; 10		SLM; 18*		TOL; 1*		2nd	1018
2026	Gio Ruggiero	18	Toyota	DAY; 1		KAN; 1*	TAL; 5*			MCH; 1	POC; 1*												KAN; 2*		1st	1018
2026	Max Reaves	18	Toyota		PHO; 9			GLN; 8	TOL; 11			BER; 1*	ELK; 1		LRP; 4	IRP; 9	IOW; 4	ISF; 1*	MAD; 3	DSF; 17	SLM; 1**	BRI; 4			1st	1018
2026	William Sawalich	18	Toyota											CHI; 24											1st	1018

=== Car No. 19 history ===
In 2018, Drew Herring drove the No. 19 NOS Energy Drink/ORCA Coolers/Advance Auto Parts Toyota at the season finale at Kansas, winning the pole and finishing eighth.

==== Car No. 19 results ====
Year	Driver	No.	Make	1	2	3	4	5	6	7	8	9	10	11	12	13	14	15	16	17	18	19	20	AMSC	Pts
2018	Drew Herring	19	Toyota	DAY	NSH	SLM	TAL	TOL	CLT	POC	MCH	MAD	GTW	CHI	IOW	ELK	POC	ISF	BLN	DSF	SLM	IRP	KAN; 8*	75th	205

=== Car No. 81 history ===
In 2017, Riley Herbst was entered at the season opener in Daytona in the team's second car (No. 81), but he was ineligible to race. Herbst and Zane Smith were both ineligible to run the season opener at Daytona, though ARCA allowed both to participate in practice.

In 2021, JGR fielded the No. 81 for Sammy Smith at Iowa, Milwaukee, and Bristol

In 2022, JGR would bring back the No. 81 for Brandon Jones in five races with sponsorship from Menards. He would win three times: Charlotte, Iowa, and Watkins Glen.

==== Car No. 81 results ====
Year	Driver	No.	Make	1	2	3	4	5	6	7	8	9	10	11	12	13	14	15	16	17	18	19	20	AMSC	Pts
2017	Riley Herbst	81	Toyota	DAY; Wth	NSH	SLM	TAL	TOL	ELK	POC	MCH	MAD	IOW	IRP	POC	WIN	ISF	ROA	DSF	SLM	CHI	KEN	KAN	–*	–*
2021	Sammy Smith	81	Toyota	DAY	PHO	TAL	KAN	TOL	CLT	MOH	POC	ELK	BLN	IOW; 18	WIN	GLN	MCH	ISF	MLW; 5	DSF	BRI; 2	SLM	KAN	29th	107
2022	Brandon Jones	81	Toyota	DAY	PHO	TAL	KAN	CLT; 1*	IOW; 1	BLN	ELK	MOH	POC; 3	IRP	MCH	GLN; 1	ISF	MLW	DSF	KAN	BRI; 2	SLM	TOL	23rd	227

=== Car No. 18 history ===
In 2020, Ty Gibbs drove the No. 18 full-time. Gibbs would win one of the series' six races on the schedule (Toledo Speedway in June) and finish runner-up to Sam Mayer in the standings, who won all other races that year. Gibbs led 104 laps at Dover in the General Tire 125 before crashing out late, marking his only DNF in the series and only finish outside the top four in any year.

In 2021, the No. 18 was run by Ty Gibbs and Sammy Smith. Smith would eventually win the East Championship.

On December 9, 2022, it was announced that William Sawalich would drive the No. 18 full-time in the 2023 ARCA Menards Series East. In his first start at Five Flags Speedway, Sawalich won the pole and led every lap to earn his first career ARCA win. At Nashville, Sawalich was in contention to win his second race, until the caution came out on the final lap. He would spin his tires on the final restart, ultimately giving the win to Luke Fenhaus. He earned his second win of the season at ARCA's return to Flat Rock Speedway, leading the final fifty laps of the race. Following the Bristol race, Sawalich clinched the ARCA Menards Series East championship.

On December 13, 2023, it was announced that Sawalich would return full-time in the ARCA Menards Series East. In the first race of the season, Sawalich would lead the most laps at Five Flags, but he would end up finishing second to Gio Ruggiero. At Dover, Sawalich won the pole and once again led the most laps, before being involved in a late race incident, unable to complete the race and finished seventeenth, the first DNF in his career. In the following race at Nashville, Sawalich rebounded and led 145 of the 150 lap race to score the dominating win. Overall, Sawalich scored three wins and seven top-three finishes to clinch his second consecutive ARCA East championship.

In 2025, Max Reaves, son of Jeremy Reaves, who is the co-owner of Cook Out, and franchise founder Morris Reaves would drive part-time in the No. 18. He would share the ride with Sawalich and Brent Crews.

==== Car No. 18 results ====
Year	Driver	No.	Make	1	2	3	4	5	6	7	8	Owners	Pts	Ref
2020	Ty Gibbs	18	Toyota	NSM; 3	TOL; 1*	DOV; 12*	TOL; 3	BRI; 2	FIF; 3			2nd	350	
2021	Sammy Smith	18	Toyota	NSM; 2*	FIF; 1*	NSV; 1*		SNM; 1				1st	435	
2021	Ty Gibbs	18	Toyota				DOV; 1**		IOW; 1*	MLW; 1**	BRI; 1*	1st	435	
2023	William Sawalich	18	Toyota	FIF; 1**	DOV; 4	NSV; 2	FRS; 1	IOW; 2*	IRP; 4	MLW; 1*	BRI; 1	1st	465	
2024	William Sawalich	18	Toyota	FIF; 2*	DOV; 17*	NSV; 1*	FRS; 2	IOW; 2	IRP; 3	MLW; 1*	BRI; 1*	1st	448	
2025	Max Reaves	18	Toyota	FIF; 1*		NSV; 1*	FRS; 1*					1st	452	
2025	William Sawalich	18	Toyota		CAR; 2							1st	452	
2025	Brent Crews	18	Toyota					DOV; 21	IRP; 1	IOW; 2	BRI; 1**	1st	452	
2026	Max Reaves	18	Toyota	HCY; 2*	ROC; 8	NSV; 1**	TOL; 11	IRP; 9	FRS; 1*	IOW; 4	BRI; 4	2nd	428	

=== Car No. 81 history ===
In 2021, the No. 81 were run by Sammy Smith while Ty Gibbs drove the No. 18. Smith would eventually win the East Championship with those cars.

In 2022, Brandon Jones drove the No. 81 for two races at Iowa and Bristol. He won the race at Iowa.

In 2025, Brent Crews drove the No. 81 to victory at Rockingham.

==== Car No. 81 results ====
Year	Driver	No.	Make	1	2	3	4	5	6	7	8	Onwers	Pts	Ref
2021	Sammy Smith	81	Toyota	NSM	FIF	NSV	DOV; 4	SNM	IOW; 18	MLW; 5	BRI; 2	11th	246	
2022	Brandon Jones	81	Toyota	NSM	FIF	NSV	DOV	IOW; 1	MLW	BRI; 2		25th	90	
2025	Brent Crews	81	Toyota	FIF	CAR; 1*	NSV	FRS	DOV	IRP	IOW	BRI	38th	49	

=== Car No. 18 history ===
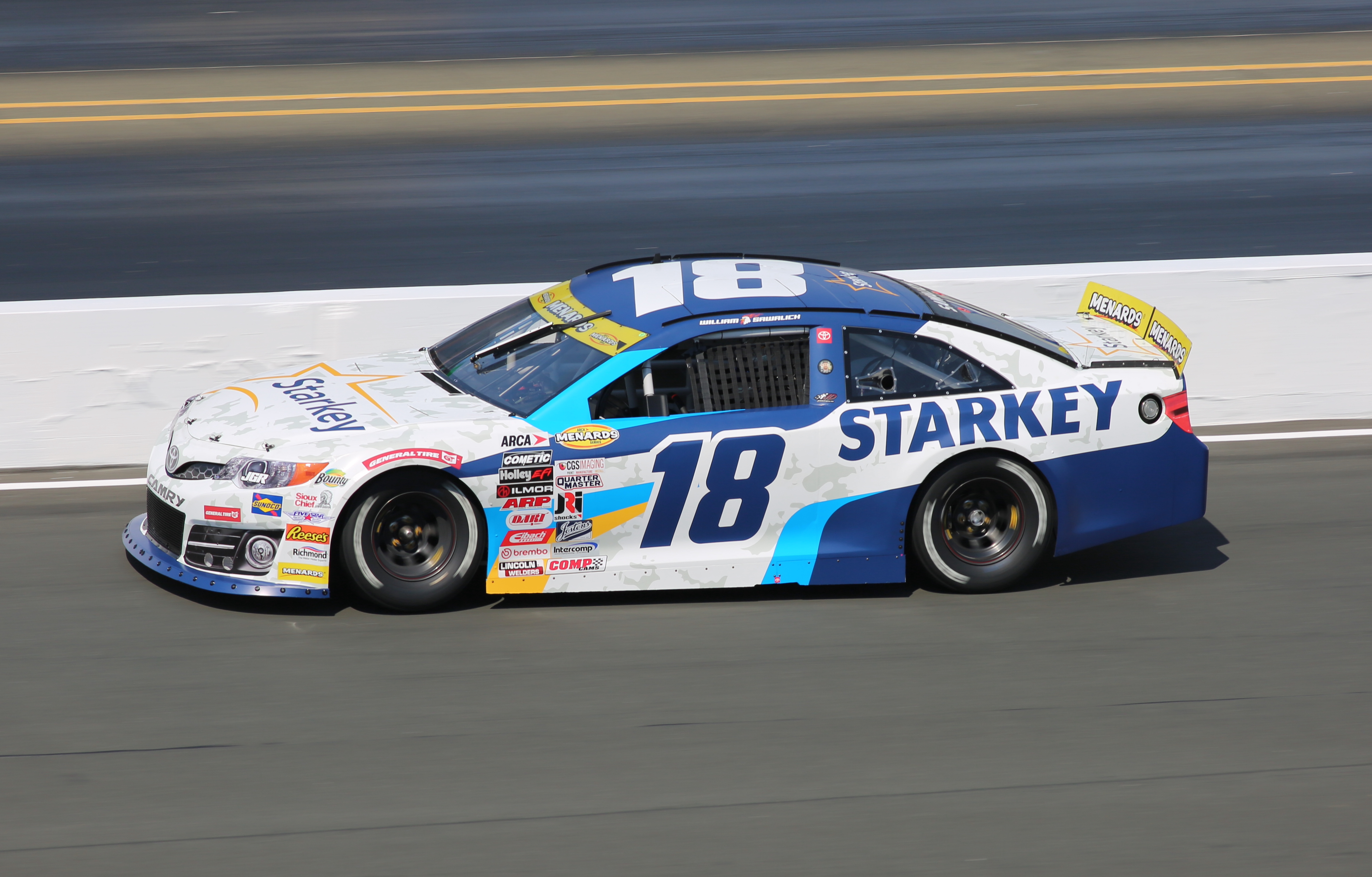
Sawalich's No. 18 car at Sonoma in 2025

In 2020, Ty Gibbs drove the No. 18 at Phoenix. He led the most laps in the event but finished second after being passed by David Gilliland on the final lap.

In 2021, Gibbs ran both races at Phoenix, starting on the pole and winning both events. The first event in March was a companion event with the main ARCA Menards Series, while the second race in November was the West Series season finale.

In 2023, William Sawalich had two top-five finished before he would pick up a win at Phoenix.

In 2024, Sawalich started the season with wins at Phoenix and Portland.

In 2025, Brent Crews won both of the Phoenix races while Sawalich won Sonoma and Portland.

In 2026, Max Reaves would compete in both Phoenix Raceway events. He finished 9th in the spring race and won the fall race from the pole.

==== Car No. 18 results ====
Year	Driver	No.	Make	1	2	3	4	5	6	7	8	9	10	11	12	13	Owners	Pts	Ref
2020	Ty Gibbs	18	Toyota	LVS	MMP	MMP	IRW	EVG	DCS	CNS	LVS	AAS	KCR	PHO; 2*			21st	94	
2021	Ty Gibbs	18	Toyota	PHO; 1*	SON	IRW	CNS	IRW	PIR	LVS	AAS	PHO; 1**					22nd	98	
2023	William Sawalich	18	Toyota	PHO; 13*	IRW	KCR	PIR; 4	SON; 5	IRW	SHA	EVG	AAS	LVS	MAD	PHO; 1*		20th	162	
2024	William Sawalich	18	Toyota	PHO; 1*	KER	PIR; 1*	SON; 4	IRW	IRW	SHA	TRI	MAD	AAS	KER	PHO; 2		21st	182	
2025	Brent Crews	18	Toyota	KER	PHO; 1	TUC	CNS	KER							PHO; 1**		16th	194	
2025	William Sawalich	18	Toyota						SON; 1**	TRI	PIR; 1*	AAS	MAD	LVS			16th	194	
2026	Max Reaves	18	Toyota	KER	PHO; 9	TUC	SHA	CNS	TRI	SON	PIR	AAS	MAD	LVS	PHO; 1*	KER			

== Controversy ==
Following the 2008 Chicagoland race, NASCAR made a regulation change specifically to Toyota, which mandated them to run a smaller restrictor plate to cut horsepower by an estimated 15 to 20 horsepower (15 kW) from their engines. After the August 16, 2008 NASCAR Nationwide Series race at Michigan International Speedway, NASCAR used a dynamometer to test the horsepower of several cars from all competing manufacturers. While testing the two Joe Gibbs Racing cars, officials found that the throttle pedal on both cars had been manipulated using magnets a quarter-inch thick to prevent the accelerator from going 100 percent wide open. Joe Gibbs issued a statement saying "we will take full responsibility and accept any penalties NASCAR levied against us" and "we will also investigate internally how this incident took place and who was involved and make whatever decisions are necessary to ensure that this kind of situation never happens again." Seven crew members were suspended indefinitely and two drivers and the team were penalized 150 points apiece.

Additionally, JGR has been at the center of controversy regarding the closure of smaller teams who formed a technical alliance with them and TRD. Examples of this are the closure of Furniture Row Racing in 2018 and Leavine Family Racing in 2020.

=== Lawsuit against Chris Gabehart and Spire Motorsports ===
On February 19, 2026, JGR filed a lawsuit against former competition director Chris Gabehart, claiming he took confidential team information and accepted a leadership role with Spire Motorsports. JGR is seeking damages of at least $8 million. On February 24, 2026, JGR added Spire as a defendant to the lawsuit and requested a temporary restraining order preventing Gabehart from working in a comparable competitive role for Spire during the non-compete period.

== Motocross team ==
In 2008, Gibbs branched out into motorcycle racing, forming the JGRMX team competing in the AMA motocross and Supercross championships. The team is based in Huntersville, North Carolina and is managed by Gibbs' son, Coy Gibbs.

On January 5, 2008, the Muscle Milk/Toyota/JGRMX Team made its racing debut in the first round of the 2008 Supercross Series in Anaheim, CA with riders Josh Hansen and Josh Summey. Josh Grant and Cody Cooper rode for the team in 2009, with Grant winning the opening round of Supercross at Anaheim. Grant and Justin Brayton rode for the team in 2010, and Davi Millsaps replaced Grant in 2011. James Stewart replaced Brayton in 2012, and won the Oakland and Daytona Supercrosses, while Millsaps finished second in points. On May 6, 2012, Stewart and the team officially parted ways.

Grant and Brayton returned as the team's two riders in 2013 and were joined by Phil Nicoletti in 2014. Justin Barcia and Weston Peick replaced Grant and Brayton on the team in 2015, with Barcia winning two nationals Budds Creek and RedBud). In 2017, the team switched from Yamaha to Suzuki and added a 250cc effort, with Nicoletti and Matt Bisceglia. For 2018, JGRMX/Autotrader/Yoshimura Suzuki became the official factory Suzuki program, with riders Peick and Justin Bogle (450) and 2017 250SX West Champion Justin Hill, Nicoletti, Jimmy Decotis, and Kyle Peters (250). Hill scored a win at San Diego while Bogle missed most of the season with injuries as Malcolm Stewart filled in for him. The 2019 team consists of two-time Supercross champion Chad Reed, Peick, Hill (450), Decotis, Peters, Alex Martin, Enzo Lopes (250). Peick suffered serious facial injuries in a crash at the Paris Supercross in October 2018.

=== JGRMX Supercross results ===
AMA Supercross Championship results
Year	Rider	No.	Class	Make	1	2	3	4	5	6	7	8	9	10	11	12	13	14	15	16	17	Pts	Rank
2008	Josh Summey	24	450	Yamaha	A1; DNQ	PHX; 9	A2; 10	SF; 11	A3; 16	SD; 20	HOU7	ATL; 7	IND; 19	DAY; 18	MIN; 12	TOR; 9	DAL; 7	DET8	STL; 11	SEA11	LV; 7	27	26th
2008	Josh Hansen	100	450	Yamaha	A1; 20	PHX; 8	A2; 8	SF	A3; DNQ	SD; 18	HOU19	ATL; 18	IND; 10	DAY; DNQ	MIN; DNQ	TOR; DNQ	DAL	DET	STL	SEA	LV; 18	12	33rd
2009	Josh Grant	33	450	Yamaha	A1; 1	PHX; 3	A2; 5	HOU5	SF; 4	A3; 5	SD; 20	ATL; 13	IND; 4	DAY; DNQ	NO; 7	STL; 3	TOR; 4	JAX; 18	SEA; 6	SLC; 6	LV; 7	237	4th
2009	Cody Cooper	21	450	Yamaha	A1 Inj	PHX Inj	A2 Inj	HOU Inj	SF Inj	A3 Inj	SD Inj	ATL Inj	IND Inj	DAY Inj	NO Inj	STL Inj	TOR Inj	JAX Inj	SEA Inj	SLC Inj	LV Inj	-	-
2009	Nathan Ramsey	25	450	Yamaha	A1	PHX	A2	HOU	SF	A3	SD	ATL	IND	DAY	NO; 15	STL; DNQ	TOR; 12	JAX; DNQ	SEA; DNQ	SLC; DNQ	LV; 9	27	25th
2010	Josh Grant	33	450	Yamaha	A1; 20	PHX; DNQ	A2	SF	SD	A3	IND	ATL	DAY	TOR	ARL	JAX	HOU	STL	SEA	SLC	LV	1	46th
2010	Justin Brayton	23	450	Yamaha	A1; 8	PHX; 8	A2; 6	SF; 6	SD5	A3; 6	IND; 4	ATL; 5	DAY; 18	TOR9	ARL; 5	JAX; 9	HOU; 9	STL; 6	SEA; 3	SLC; 7	LV; 8	238	5th
2010	Michael Byrne	26	450	Yamaha	A1	PHX	A2; 9	SF; 10	SD; 14	A3; 8	IND; 13	ATL; 7	DAY; 12	TOR; 12	ARL; 11	JAX; 10	HOU; 14	STL; 7	SEA; 7	SLC; 6	LV; 11	170	11th
2011	Davi Millsaps	18	450	Yamaha	A1; 19	PHX; 11	LA; 13	OAK; 8	A2; 10	HOU; 4	SD; 5	ATL; 11	DAY; 5	IND; 11	JAX; 17	TOR; 11	ARL; 20	STL; 7	SEA; 8	SLC; 5	LV; 13	180	8th
2011	Justin Brayton	10	450	Yamaha	A1; 16	PHX; 6	LA; 5	OAK; 18	A2; 4	HOU13	SD; 10	ATL; 7	DAY6	IND; 5	JAX; DNQ	TOR; 5	ARL; 17	STL	SEA	SLC; 9	LV; 19	155	9th
2012	Davi Millsaps	18	450	Yamaha	A1; 16	PHX; 13	LA; 6	OAK; 7	A2; 7	SD; 7	ARL; 15	ATL; 4	STL; 6	DAY; 2	IND; 3	TOR4	HOU; 2	NO; 6	SEA; 5	SLC; 2	LV; 2	266	2nd
2012	James Stewart	7	450	Yamaha	A1; 6	PHX; 8	LA; 3	OAK; 1	A2; 2	SD; 15	ARL; 6	ATL; 3	STL; 5	DAY; 1	IND; DNQ	TOR	HOU20	NO	SEA	SLC	LV	178	7th
2012	Gavin Faith	617	450	Yamaha	A1	PHX	LA	OAK	A2	SD	ARL	ATL	STL	DAY	IND	TOR	HOU	NO	SEA; DNQ	SLC; 14	LV; 14	38	23rd
2013	Josh Grant	33	450	Yamaha	A1; 11	PHX; 10	A2; 10	OAK; 16	A3; 18	SD; DNS	ARL	ATL	STL	DAY	IND	TOR	HOU	MIN	SEA	SLC	LV	40	21st
2013	Justin Brayton	10	450	Yamaha	A1; 9	PHX; 15	A2; 8	OAK; 10	A3; 10	SD; 7	ARL; 5	ATL; 13	STL; 9	DAY; 20	IND; 13	TOR; 11	HOU; 6	MIN; 9	SEA; 8	SLC; 6	LV; 8	190	8th
2013	Kyle Chisholm	11	450	Yamaha	A1	PHX	A2	OAK	A3	SD	ARL	ATL; DNQ	STL; 20	DAY	IND	TOR	HOU	MIN	SEA	SLC	LV	38	24th
2014	Josh Grant	33	450	Yamaha	A1; 7	PHX	A2; 14	OAK; 11	A3; 17	SD	ARL	ATL; 9	IND; 12	DAY; 10	DET 10	TOR	STL; DNQ	HOU; 21	SEA	ER; 16	LV; 7	98	16th
2014	Justin Brayton	10	450	Yamaha	A1; 6	PHX; 2	A2; 4	OAK; 5	A3; 6	SD; 9	ARL; 5	ATL; 5	IND; 8	DAY; 9	DET 9	TOR; 4	STL; 10	HOU; DNS	SEA	ER	LV	196	7th
2014	Phil Nicoletti	38	450	Yamaha	A1	PHX	A2	OAK	A3	SD; 20	ARL; 22	ATL; 22	IND	DAY; 13	DET	TOR	STL	HOU	SEA; 17	ER; 12	LV; DNS	24	31st
2014	Vince Friese	42	450	Yamaha	A1	PHX	A2	OAK	A3	SD	ARL	ATL	IND	DAY	DET	TOR	STL	HOU	SEA; 21	ER	LV	30	29th
2015	Weston Peick	23	450	Yamaha	A1; 7	PHX; 4	A2	OAK	A3	SD	ARL; 22	ATL15	ATL210	DAY; 8	IND; 4	DET 22	STL; 5	HOU; 22	SC; 3	ER; 10	LV; 3	160	10th
2015	Justin Barcia	51	450	Yamaha	A1; 6	PHX; 11	A2; 4	OAK; 6	A3; 8	SD	ARL	ATL1	ATL2	DAY	IND	DET	STL	HOU; 9	SC; 16	ER; 20	LV; 8	102	15th
2015	Phil Nicoletti	46	450	Yamaha	A1	PHX	A2	OAK	A3	SD	ARL	ATL1	ATL2	DAY	IND	DET	STL	HOU	SC	ER	LV	-	-
2016	Weston Peick	28	450	Yamaha	A1; DNQ	SD1	A2; 14	OAK; 11	GLE; 11	SD2; 9	ARL; 21	ATL; 12	DAY; 18	TOR; 8	DET 7	SC; 8	IND; 16	STL; 16	FOX; 8	ER; 11	LV	125	13th
2016	Justin Barcia	51	450	Yamaha	A1; 15	SD1; 11	A2	OAK	GLE	SD2	ARL	ATL	DAY	TOR	DET	SC; 16	IND; 15	STL; 11	FOX; 19	ER; 15	LV; 10	56	21st
2016	Phil Nicoletti	34	450	Yamaha	A1	SD1; 21	A2; 21	OAK; 19	GLE; 17	SD2; 18	ARL; 15	ATL	DAY; 21	TOR	DET 14	SC	IND	STL	FOX	ER	LV	25	24th
2017	Weston Peick	32	450	Suzuki	A1; 8	SD; 7	A2; 5	GLE	OAK	ARL	MIN	ATL	TOR	DAY	IND	DET	STL	SEA	SLC	ER	LV	39	22nd
2017	Justin Barcia	51	450	Suzuki	A1	SD	A2	GLE	OAK	ARL	MIN; 17	ATL; 16	TOR; 9	DAY; 11	IND; 10	DET 12	STL; 15	SEA; 13	SLC; 16	ER; 9	LV; 21	83	17th
2017	Phil Nicoletti	37	250 West	Suzuki	A1; 17	SD; 8	A2; 12	GLE; 9	OAK; 5	ARL	MIN	ATL	TOR	DAY	IND	DET	STL	SEA	SLC	ER	LV	54	14th
2017	Matt Bisceglia	43	250 East	Suzuki	A1	SD	A2	GLE	OAK	ARL	MIN	ATL	TOR	DAY	IND	DET	STL	SEA	SLC	ER	LV	-	-
2017	Jake Weimer	12	450	Suzuki	A1; 11	SD; 16	A2; 15	GLE; 21	OAK; 13	ARL; 7	MIN; 13	ATL; 18	TOR; 14	DAY; 17	IND; 16	DET 17	STL; 17	SEA; 11	SLC; 14	ER; 11	LV; 14	113	14th
2017	Kyle Peters	56	250 East	Suzuki	A1	SD	A2	GLE	OAK	ARL	MIN; 9	ATL; 9	TOR; 8	DAY	IND	DET	STL	SEA	SLC	ER	LV	37	18th
2017	Kyle Cunningham	42	250 East	Suzuki	A1	SD	A2	GLE	OAK	ARL	MIN	ATL	TOR	DAY; 7	IND; 10	DET 5	STL; 9	SEA	SLC	ER; 6	LV	77	10th
2017	Cade Autenrieth	330	250 West	Suzuki	A1	SD	A2	GLE	OAK	ARL	MIN	ATL	TOR	DAY	IND	DET	STL	SEA; DNQ	SLC; 13	ER	LV	8	28th
2018	Weston Peick	34	450	Suzuki	A1; 5	HOU5	A2; 5	GLE; 6	OAK; 12	SD; 7	ARL; 7	TAM; 12	ATL; 12	DAY; 6	STL; 5	IND; 22	SEA; 10	MIN; 6	FOX; 6	SLC; 7	LV; 7	251	6th
2018	Justin Bogle	19	450	Suzuki	A1	HOU	A2	GLE; 17	OAK; 17	SD	ARL	TAM	ATL	DAY	STL	IND	SEA	MIN	FOX	SLC	LV	12	35th
2018	Justin Hill	1	250 West	Suzuki	A1; 7	HOU10	A2; 10	GLE; 7	OAK; 3	SD; 1	ARL	TAM	ATL	DAY	STL	IND	SEA; 9	MIN	FOX	SLC; 14	LV; 15	136	6th
2018	Justin Hill	46	450	Suzuki	A1	HOU	A2	GLE	OAK	SD	ARL	TAM; 6	ATL; 22	DAY	STL	IND	SEA	MIN	FOX	SLC	LV	18	30th
2018	Jimmy Decotis	47	250 East	Suzuki	A1	HOU	A2	GLE	OAK	SD	ARL; 3	TAM; 10	ATL; 10	DAY; 21	STL	IND	SEA	MIN	FOX	SLC	LV	49	19th
2018	Phil Nicoletti	54	250 West	Suzuki	A1; 22	HOU12	A2; 9	GLE; 11	OAK; 22	SD; 11	ARL	TAM	ATL	DAY	STL	IND; 9	SEA; 11	MIN	FOX	SLC; 6	LV	94	11th
2018	Kyle Peters	76	250 East	Suzuki	A1	HOU	A2	GLE	OAK	SD	ARL; 15	TAM; 13	ATL; 7	DAY; 6	STL; 4	IND; 8	SEA	MIN; 22	FOX; 3	SLC	LV; 18	112	6th
2018	Malcolm Stewart	27	450	Suzuki	A1	HOU11	A2; 11	GLE; 13	OAK; 22	SD; 17	ARL; 11	TAM; 8	ATL; 9	DAY; 16	STL; 10	IND; 6	SEA; 17	MIN; 14	FOX; 7	SLC; 14	LV; 13	169	11th
2019	Weston Peick	18	450	Suzuki	A1	GLE	A2	OAK	SD	MIN	ARL	DET	ATL	DAY	IND	SEA	HOU	NAS	DEN	ER	LV	-	Inj
2019	Justin Hill	46	450	Suzuki	A1; 15	GLE; 13	A2; 11	OAK; 14	SD	MIN	ARL; 13	DET 13	ATL; 11	DAY; 7	IND; 14	SEA; 12	HOU; 11	NAS; 20	DEN; 10	ER; 10	LV; 9	162	11th
2019	Alex Martin	26	250 East	Suzuki	A1	GLE	A2	OAK	SD	MIN; 4	ARL; 8	DET 6	ATL; 14	DAY; 5	IND; 9	SEA	HOU	NAS; 10	DEN	ER; 7	LV; 5	139	5th
2019	Kyle Peters	55	250 East	Suzuki	A1	GLE	A2	OAK	SD	MIN; 10	ARL; 7	DET 8	ATL; 21	DAY; 7	IND; 6	SEA	HOU	NAS; 4	DEN	ER; 6	LV; 12	126	8th
2019	Jimmy Decotis	64	250 West	Suzuki	A1; 7	GLE; 5	A2; 13	OAK; 15	SD; 3	MIN	ARL	DET	ATL	DAY	IND	SEA; 3	HOU; 5	NAS	DEN; 7	ER	LV; 18	133	7th
2019	Enzo Lopes	67	250 West	Suzuki	A1; 15	GLE; 21	A2; 14	OAK	SD; 19	MIN	ARL	DET	ATL	DAY	IND	SEA; 9	HOU	NAS	DEN; 10	ER	LV	50	16th
2019	Chad Reed	22	450	Suzuki	A1; 9	GLE; 14	A2; 13	OAK; 9	SD; 5	MIN; 7	ARL; 11	DET 3	ATL; 13	DAY; 10	IND; 11	SEA; 21	HOU	NAS	DEN	ER	LV	151	15th
2020	Joey Savatgy	17	450	Suzuki	A1	STL	A2	GLE	OAK	SD	TAM	ARL	ATL	DAY	SLC1	SLC2	SLC3	SLC4	SLC5	SLC6	SLC7	-	-
2020	Fredrik Noren	31	450	Suzuki	A1; 21	STL	A2	GLE	OAK	SD	TAM	ARL	ATL	DAY	SLC121	SLC2	SLC3	SLC4	SLC5	SLC620	SLC719	11th	27th
2020	Alex Martin	26	250 West	Suzuki	A1; 10	STL; 4	A2; 5	GLE; 7	OAK; 4	SD; 10	TAM	ARL	ATL	DAY	SLC1	SLC2	SLC3	SLC46	SLC521	SLC6	SLC716	124	6th
2020	Jimmy Decotis	53	450	Suzuki	A1; 22	STL; 20	A2	GLE	OAK	SD	TAM	ARL	ATL	DAY	SLC1	SLC2	SLC3	SLC4	SLC5	SLC6	SLC7	4	33rd
2020	Jimmy Decotis	53	250 East	Suzuki	A1	STL	A2	GLE	OAK	SD	TAM; 9	ARL	ATL; 13	DAY	SLC1	SLC2	SLC3	SLC4	SLC5	SLC6	SLC7	24	28th
2020	Broc Tickle	20	450	Suzuki	A1	STL	A2	GLE	OAK	SD	TAM; 12	ARL; 22	ATL	DAY	SLC1	SLC2	SLC317	SLC417	SLC512	SLC616	SLC76	59	20th
2020	Isaac Teasdale	79	250 East	Suzuki	A1	STL	A2	GLE	OAK	SD	TAM; 21	ARL; 20	ATL	DAY	SLC1	SLC2	SLC3	SLC4	SLC5	SLC6	SLC7	5	39th
2020	Charles Lefrancois	224	450	Suzuki	A1	STL	A2	GLE	OAK	SD	TAM	ARL	ATL	DAY; DNQ	SLC1	SLC2	SLC3	SLC4	SLC5	SLC6	SLC7	-	-

== J. D. Gibbs health complications and passing ==
It was reported on March 25, 2015, that J. D. Gibbs had begun treatment for symptoms impacting areas of brain function, including speech and processing issues. It was later announced on January 11, 2019, that J. D. Gibbs had died following complications of degenerative neurological disease. A memorial service was held on January 25, 2019.
