= 2021 Dawn 150 =

2021 Dawn Ultra 150
Race details
- Race 7 of 20 of the 2021 ARCA Menards Series
- Date: June 4, 2021
- Official name: Dawn Ultra 150
- Location: Lexington, Ohio, Mid-Ohio Sports Car Course
- Course: Permanent racing facility
- Course length: 3.634 km (2.258 miles)
- Distance: 42 laps, 94.836 mi (152.62 km)
- Scheduled distance: 42 laps, 94.836 mi (152.62 km)
- Average speed: 71.456 miles per hour (114.997 km/h)

Pole position
Driver	Corey Heim	Venturini Motorsports
- Time: 1:27:877

Most laps led
Driver	Ty Gibbs	Joe Gibbs Racing
- Laps: 35

Winner
No. 18	Ty Gibbs	Joe Gibbs Racing

Television in the United States
- Network: Fox Sports 1
- Announcers: Jamie Little, Phil Parsons

Radio in the United States
- Radio: Motor Racing Network

The 2021 Dawn Ultra 150 was the seventh stock car race of the 2021 ARCA Menards Series season, the second race of the 2021 Sioux Chief Showdown, and the second iteration of the event. The race was held on Friday, June 4, in Lexington, Ohio at the Mid-Ohio Sports Car Course, a 2.258 miles (3.634 km) permanent road course. The race took the scheduled 42 laps to complete. At race's end, Ty Gibbs would dominate for his 13th ARCA Menards Series career win, his fifth of the season, and his fourth win in a row of the season. To fill out the podium, Austin Hill of Hattori Racing Enterprises and Thad Moffitt of David Gilliland Racing would finish second and third, respectively.

== Background ==
The track is a road course auto racing facility located in Troy Township, Morrow County, Ohio, United States, just outside the village of Lexington. Mid-Ohio has also colloquially become a term for the entire north-central region of the state, from south of Sandusky to the north of Columbus.

The track opened as a 15-turn, 2.4 mile (3.86 km) road circuit run clockwise. The back portion of the track allows speeds approaching 180 mph (290 km/h). A separate starting line is located on the backstretch to allow for safer rolling starts. The regular start / finish line is located on the pit straight. There is grandstand seating for 10,000 spectators and three observation mounds alongside the track raise the capacity to over 75,000.

=== Entry list ===
#	Driver	Team	Make	Sponsor
1	Austin Hill	Hattori Racing Enterprises	Toyota	ARCO National Construction
01	Owen Smith	Fast Track Racing	Ford	Academy Mortgage
2	Nick Sanchez	Rev Racing	Chevrolet	Max Siegel Incorporated
02	Mark Green	Young's Motorsports	Chevrolet	Young's Motorsports
06	Con Nicolopoulos*	Wayne Peterson Racing	Chevrolet	Great Railing
10	Arnout Kok	Fast Track Racing	Toyota	Steel Seal, South Africa "Inspiring new ways"
11	Tony Cosentino	Fast Track Racing	Ford	Fast Track Racing
12	Stanton Barrett	Fast Track Racing	Toyota	Fast Track Racing
15	Drew Dollar	Venturini Motorsports	Toyota	Sunbelt Rentals
18	Ty Gibbs	Joe Gibbs Racing	Toyota	Joe Gibbs Racing
20	Corey Heim	Venturini Motorsports	Toyota	Craftsman
25	Brandon Jones	Venturini Motorsports	Toyota	Bounty "The Quicker Picker Upper", Tide
27	Tim Richmond	Richmond Clubb Motorsports	Toyota	Richmond Clubb Motorsports
28	Kyle Sieg	RSS Racing	Chevrolet	Eastern Fuel Systems, Night Owl Contractors
30	Kris Wright	Rette Jones Racing	Ford	America's Auto Auction
46	Thad Moffitt	David Gilliland Racing	Ford	Dirteeze
48	Brad Smith	Brad Smith Motorsports	Chevrolet	Henshaw Automation
69	Russ Lane	Kimmel Racing	Ford	National Auto Sport Association Central Region
Official entry list

== Qualifying ==
Qualifying would take place on Friday, June 4, at 2:45 PM EST. The qualifying system was a 45 minute session where drivers could run as many laps as they wanted within the session to set a time. Corey Heim of Venturini Motorsports would win the pole, setting a time of one minute, 27.877 seconds and an average speed of 92.502 miles per hour (148.868 km/h).

=== Full qualifying results ===
Pos.	#	Driver	Team	Make	Time	Speed
1	20	Corey Heim	Venturini Motorsports	Toyota	1:27.877	92.502
2	18	Ty Gibbs	Joe Gibbs Racing	Toyota	1:28.504	91.847
3	25	Brandon Jones	Venturini Motorsports	Toyota	1:28.648	91.698
4	30	Kris Wright	Rette Jones Racing	Ford	1:28.702	91.698
5	2	Nick Sanchez	Rev Racing	Chevrolet	1:29.336	90.991
6	15	Drew Dollar	Venturini Motorsports	Toyota	1:29.827	90.991
7	1	Austin Hill	Hattori Racing Enterprises	Toyota	1:31.023	89.305
8	12	Stanton Barrett	Fast Track Racing	Toyota	1:31.366	89.305
9	46	Thad Moffitt	David Gilliland Racing	Ford	1:31.592	88.750
10	69	Russ Lane	Kimmel Racing	Ford	1:32.631	87.755
11	10	Arnout Kok	Fast Track Racing	Toyota	1:37.208	83.623
12	27	Tim Richmond	Richmond Clubb Motorsports	Toyota	1:39.506	81.692
13	28	Kyle Sieg	RSS Racing	Chevrolet	1:39.739	81.501
14	11	Tony Cosentino	Fast Track Racing	Ford	1:40.585	80.815
15	02	Mark Green	Young's Motorsports	Chevrolet	1:55.613	70.310
16	01	Owen Smith	Fast Track Racing	Ford	2:13.701	60.798
Provisional
17	48	Brad Smith	Brad Smith Motorsports	Chevrolet	—	—
Withdrew
WD	06	Con Nicolopoulos	Wayne Peterson Racing	Chevrolet	—	—
Official qualifying results

== Race results ==
Fin	St	#	Driver	Team	Make	Laps	Led	Status	Pts
1	2	18	Ty Gibbs	Joe Gibbs Racing	Toyota	42	35	running	49
2	7	1	Austin Hill	Hattori Racing Enterprises	Toyota	42	0	running	42
3	9	46	Thad Moffitt	David Gilliland Racing	Ford	42	0	running	41
4	3	25	Brandon Jones	Venturini Motorsports	Toyota	42	4	running	41
5	5	2	Nick Sanchez	Rev Racing	Chevrolet	42	0	running	39
6	8	12	Stanton Barrett	Fast Track Racing	Toyota	42	0	running	38
7	1	20	Corey Heim	Venturini Motorsports	Toyota	42	3	running	38
8	4	30	Kris Wright	Rette Jones Racing	Ford	41	0	running	36
9	11	10	Arnout Kok	Fast Track Racing	Toyota	41	0	running	35
10	13	28	Kyle Sieg	RSS Racing	Chevrolet	41	0	running	34
11	10	69	Russ Lane	Kimmel Racing	Ford	39	0	running	33
12	6	15	Drew Dollar	Venturini Motorsports	Toyota	15	0	suspension	32
13	12	27	Tim Richmond	Richmond Clubb Motorsports	Toyota	13	0	ignition	31
14	16	01	Owen Smith	Fast Track Racing	Ford	7	0	brakes	30
15	14	11	Tony Cosentino	Fast Track Racing	Ford	5	0	vibration	29
16	17	48	Brad Smith	Brad Smith Motorsports	Chevrolet	5	0	handling	28
17	15	02	Mark Green	Young's Motorsports	Chevrolet	5	0	vibration	27
Withdrew
WD		06	Con Nicolopoulos	Wayne Peterson Racing	Chevrolet				
Official race results

Previous race: 2021 General Tire 150 (Charlotte)	ARCA Menards Series; 2021 season	Next race: 2021 General Tire #AnywhereIsPossible 200
