= 2021 Dutch Boy 150 =

Race details
- Race 4 of 20 of the 2021 ARCA Menards Series
- Date: May 1, 2021
- Official name: Dutch Boy 150
- Location: Kansas City, Kansas, Kansas Speedway
- Course: Permanent racing facility
- Course length: 1.5 miles (2.41 km)
- Distance: 100 laps, 150 mi (241.402 km)
- Scheduled distance: 100 laps, 150 mi (241.402 km)
- Average speed: 123.768 miles per hour (199.185 km/h)

Pole position
Driver	Ty Gibbs	Joe Gibbs Racing
- Time: 30.573

Most laps led
Driver	Ty Gibbs	Joe Gibbs Racing
- Laps: 100

Winner
No. 18	Ty Gibbs	Joe Gibbs Racing

Television in the United States
- Network: Fox Sports 1
- Announcers: Jamie Little, Phil Parsons

Radio in the United States
- Radio: Motor Racing Network

The 2021 Dutch Boy 150 was the fourth stock car race of the 2021 ARCA Menards Series season and the second iteration of the event. The race was held on Saturday, May 1, 2021 in Kansas City, Kansas at Kansas Speedway, 1.5 miles (2.4 km) permanent D-shaped oval racetrack. The race took the scheduled 100 laps to complete. At race's end, Ty Gibbs would dominate, leading every lap to win his 10th career ARCA Menards Series win and the second of the season. To fill out the podium, Drew Dollar and Corey Heim, both driving for Venturini Motorsports would finish second and third, respectively.

== Background ==
The layout of Kansas Speedway, the venue where the race was held.

Kansas Speedway is a 1.5-mile (2.4 km) tri-oval race track in Kansas City, Kansas. It was built in 2001 and hosts two annual NASCAR race weekends. The NTT IndyCar Series also raced there until 2011. The speedway is owned and operated by the International Speedway Corporation.

=== Entry list ===
#	Driver	Team	Make	Sponsor
01	Owen Smith	Fast Track Racing	Ford	Fast Track Racing
2	Nick Sanchez	Rev Racing	Chevrolet	Honda Generators, Max Siegel Inc.
02	Toni Breidinger	Young's Motorsports	Chevrolet	Young's Motorsports
7	Eric Caudell	CCM Racing	Toyota	ETRM Software Consulting, Five B Cattle
10	Jason Miles	Fast Track Racing	Chevrolet	Andolina Materials, Pay2Win Setups
11	Dick Doheny	Fast Track Racing	Toyota	The Brews Box
12	D. L. Wilson	Fast Track Racing	Toyota	Panagenics, The Center for Factual Innocence
15	Drew Dollar	Venturini Motorsports	Toyota	Sunbelt Rentals
18	Ty Gibbs	Joe Gibbs Racing	Toyota	Joe Gibbs Racing
20	Corey Heim	Venturini Motorsports	Toyota	JBL
21	Jack Wood	GMS Racing	Chevrolet	Chevrolet Accessories
23	Bret Holmes	Bret Holmes Racing	Chevrolet	Southern States Bank
25	Derek Griffith	Venturini Motorsports	Toyota	SpotOn
27	Alex Clubb	Richmond Clubb Motorsports	Ford	Let's Party Party Room Rental Venue
28	Kyle Sieg	RSS Racing	Chevrolet	C2 Freight Resources
35	Greg Van Alst	Greg Van Alst Motorsports	Chevrolet	CB Fabricating
46	Thad Moffitt	David Gilliland Racing	Ford	Aqua ChemPacs, CleanPacs
48	Brad Smith	Brad Smith Motorsports	Chevrolet	Henshaw Automation
69	Scott Melton	Kimmel Racing	Chevrolet	Melton-McFadden Insurance Agency
91	Justin Carroll	TC Motorsports	Toyota	Carroll's Automotive
Official entry list

== Qualifying ==
Qualifying would take place on Saturday, May 1, at 10:00 AM CST. Ty Gibbs of Joe Gibbs Racing would win the pole with a lap of 30.573 and an average speed of 176.626 miles per hour (284.252 km/h).

No drivers would fail to qualify.

=== Full qualifying results ===
Pos.	#	Driver	Team	Make	Time	Speed
1	18	Ty Gibbs	Joe Gibbs Racing	Toyota	30.573	176.626
2	23	Bret Holmes	Bret Holmes Racing	Chevrolet	31.047	173.930
3	20	Corey Heim	Venturini Motorsports	Toyota	31.052	173.902
4	21	Jack Wood	GMS Racing	Chevrolet	31.125	173.494
5	15	Drew Dollar	Venturini Motorsports	Toyota	31.272	172.678
6	25	Derek Griffith	Venturini Motorsports	Toyota	31.530	171.265
7	2	Nick Sanchez	Rev Racing	Chevrolet	31.736	170.154
8	35	Greg Van Alst	Greg Van Alst Motorsports	Chevrolet	31.912	169.215
9	46	Thad Moffitt	David Gilliland Racing	Ford	32.003	168.734
10	69	Scott Melton	Kimmel Racing	Chevrolet	32.370	166.821
11	28	Kyle Sieg	RSS Racing	Chevrolet	32.398	166.677
12	91	Justin Carroll	TC Motorsports	Toyota	33.087	163.206
13	02	Toni Breidinger	Young's Motorsports	Chevrolet	33.466	161.358
14	7	Eric Caudell	CCM Racing	Toyota	33.748	160.009
15	12	D. L. Wilson	Fast Track Racing	Toyota	35.070	153.978
16	01	Owen Smith	Fast Track Racing	Ford	35.366	152.689
17	48	Brad Smith	Brad Smith Motorsports	Chevrolet	35.796	150.855
18	10	Jason Miles	Fast Track Racing	Chevrolet	36.728	147.027
19	27	Alex Clubb	Richmond Clubb Motorsports	Ford	37.191	145.196
20	11	Dick Doheny	Fast Track Racing	Toyota	37.559	143.774
Official qualifying results

== Race results ==
Fin	St	#	Driver	Team	Make	Laps	Led	Status	Pts
1	1	18	Ty Gibbs	Joe Gibbs Racing	Toyota	100	100	Running	49
2	5	15	Drew Dollar	Venturini Motorsports	Toyota	100	0	Running	42
3	3	20	Corey Heim	Venturini Motorsports	Toyota	100	0	Running	41
4	4	21	Jack Wood	GMS Racing	Chevrolet	100	0	Running	40
5	6	25	Derek Griffith	Venturini Motorsports	Toyota	100	0	Running	39
6	9	46	Thad Moffitt	David Gilliland Racing	Ford	100	0	Running	38
7	8	35	Greg Van Alst	Greg Van Alst Motorsports	Chevrolet	100	0	Running	37
8	11	28	Kyle Sieg	RSS Racing	Chevrolet	99	0	Running	36
9	7	2	Nick Sanchez	Rev Racing	Chevrolet	98	0	Running	35
10	19	27	Alex Clubb	Richmond Clubb Motorsports	Ford	95	0	Running	34
11	15	12	D. L. Wilson	Fast Track Racing	Toyota	93	0	Running	33
12	13	02	Toni Breidinger	Young's Motorsports	Chevrolet	90	0	Running	32
13	12	91	Justin Carroll	TC Motorsports	Toyota	83	0	Running	31
14	14	7	Eric Caudell	CCM Racing	Toyota	66	0	Vibration	30
15	18	10	Jason Miles	Fast Track Racing	Chevrolet	59	0	Running	29
16	17	48	Brad Smith	Brad Smith Motorsports	Chevrolet	23	0	Handlin	28
17	20	11	Dick Doheny	Fast Track Racing	Toyota	12	0	Vibration	27
18	16	01	Owen Smith	Fast Track Racing	Ford	9	0	Electrical	26
19	2	23	Bret Holmes	Bret Holmes Racing	Chevrolet	0	0	Accident	25
20	10	69	Scott Melton	Kimmel Racing	Chevrolet	0	0	Accident	24
Official race results

Previous race: 2021 General Tire 200	ARCA Menards Series; 2021 season	Next race: 2021 Herr's Potato Chips 200
