= Jason Miles (racing driver) =

American professional stock car racing driver

- Born: August 12, 1980 (age 46); Indian Trail, North Carolina, U.S.

ARCA Menards Series career
- 6 races run over 2 years
- Best finish: 41st (2019)
- First race: 2019 General Tire 150 (Charlotte)
- Last race: 2021 Sprecher 150 (Milwaukee)
Wins	Top tens	Poles
0	0	0

ARCA Menards Series East career
- 2 races run over 2 years
- Best finish: 27th (2019)
- First race: 2019 WhosYourDriver.org Twin 100s #1 (South Boston)
- Last race: 2021 Sprecher 150 (Milwaukee)
Wins	Top tens	Poles
0	0	0
- Statistics up to date as of January 5, 2022.

Jason Miles (born August 12, 1980) is an American professional stock car racing owner-driver. He last competed part-time in the ARCA Menards Series, driving for Fast Track Racing.

== Racing career ==
=== Early career ===
Miles started at the age of six, first racing go-karts. Within years, he would move up to late models, driving for Dale Earnhardt, Inc., finding success with numerous wins across the late model scene. However, in 1999, he suffered a career-ending crash.

In 2015, Miles raced in a test session as his comeback to racing. In 2019, he made his first race in the ARCA Menards Series, finishing eighteenth.

=== NASCAR career ===
In September 2021, Miles announced that along with long-time racing fan Mark Thomas, they would create their own team called Miles Thomas Motorsports. Miles, driving for the team, was scheduled to run part-time in both the NASCAR Xfinity Series and the ARCA Menards Series, although they never attempted a race in either series that year.

== Motorsports career results ==
=== ARCA Menards Series ===
(key) (Bold – Pole position awarded by qualifying time. Italics – Pole position earned by points standings or practice time. * – Most laps led.)

ARCA Menards Series results
Year	Team	No.	Make	1	2	3	4	5	6	7	8	9	10	11	12	13	14	15	16	17	18	19	20	AMSC	Pts	Ref
2019	Fast Track Racing	11	Ford	DAY	FIF	SLM	TAL	NSH	TOL	CLT; 18	POC	MCH	MAD	GTW										69th	150	
2019	Fast Track Racing	1	Ford												CHI; 19	ELK	IOW; 18	POC	ISF	DSF	SLM	IRP	KAN	69th	150	
2021	Fast Track Racing	10	Chevy	DAY	PHO	TAL	KAN	TOL; 15	CLT	MOH; 21	POC	ELK	BLN	IOW	WIN	GLN	MCH	ISF						47th	78	
2021	Fast Track Racing	01	Chevy																MLW; 18	DSF	BRI	SLM	KAN	47th	78	

==== ARCA Menards Series East ====
ARCA Menards Series East results
Year	Team	No.	Make	1	2	3	4	5	6	7	8	9	10	11	12	AMSEC	Pts	Ref
2019	Kart Idaho Racing	36	Ford	NSM	BRI	SBO; 13	SBO	MEM	NHA	IOW	GLN	BRI	GTW	NHA	DOV	27th	62	
2021	Fast Track Racing	01	Chevy	NSM	FIF	NSV	DOV	SNM	IOW	MLW; 18	BRI					51st	26	
