= 2021 Sprecher 150 =

Race details
- Race 16 of 20 of the 2021 ARCA Menards Series; Race 7 of 8 of the 2021 ARCA Menards Series East; Race 8 of 10 of the 2021 Sioux Chief Showdown
- Date: August 29, 2021
- Official name: 6th Annual Sprecher 150
- Location: West Allis, Wisconsin, Milwaukee Mile
- Course: Permanent racing facility
- Course length: 1 miles (1.6 km)
- Distance: 150 laps, 150 mi (240 km)
- Scheduled distance: 150 laps, 150 mi (240 km)
- Average speed: 100.615 miles per hour (161.924 km/h)

Pole position
Driver	Ty Gibbs	Joe Gibbs Racing
- Time: 29.354

Most laps led
Driver	Ty Gibbs	Joe Gibbs Racing
- Laps: 150

Winner
No. 18	Ty Gibbs	Joe Gibbs Racing

Television in the United States
- Network: MAVTV
- Announcers: Bob Dillner, Jim Trebow

Radio in the United States
- Radio: ARCA Racing Network

The 2021 Sprecher 150 was the 16th stock car race of the 2021 ARCA Menards Series season, the seventh race of the 2021 ARCA Menards Series East season, the eighth race of the 2021 Sioux Chief Showdown, and the sixth iteration of the event. The race was held on Sunday, August 29, 2021, in West Allis, Wisconsin at the Milwaukee Mile, a 1 mile (1.6 km) permanent oval-shaped, low-banked racetrack. The race took the scheduled 150 laps to complete. At race's end, Ty Gibbs of Joe Gibbs Racing would dominate the race, leading every lap en route to his 17th career ARCA Menards Series win and his ninth of the season. To fill out the podium, Sam Mayer of Bret Holmes Racing and Daniel Dye of GMS Racing would finish second and third, respectively.

== Background ==
The Milwaukee Mile is a one-mile-long (1.6 km) oval race track in the central United States, located on the grounds of the Wisconsin State Fair Park in West Allis, Wisconsin, a suburb west of Milwaukee. Its grandstand and bleachers seated approximately 37,000 spectators. Paved 67 years ago in 1954, it was originally a dirt track. In addition to the oval, there was a 1.8 mile (2.8 km) road circuit located on the infield.

As the oldest operating motor speedway in the world, the Milwaukee Mile has hosted at least one auto race every year from 1903 to 2015 (except during U.S. involvement in World War II). The track has held events sanctioned by major bodies, such as the AAA, USAC, NASCAR, CART/Champ Car World Series, and the IndyCar Series. There have also been many races in regional series such as ARTGO.

=== Entry list ===
#	Driver	Team	Make	Sponsor
01	Jason Miles	Fast Track Racing	Chevrolet	Carolina Sim Works
2	Nick Sanchez	Rev Racing	Chevrolet	Max Siegel Incorporated
02	Connor Mosack	Young's Motorsports	Chevrolet	Nic Tailor Custom Fit Underwear
6	Rajah Caruth	Rev Racing	Chevrolet	Universal Technical Institute, NASCAR Technical Institute
7	Eric Caudell	CCM Racing	Ford	ETRM Software Counseling
10	Arnout Kok	Fast Track Racing	Toyota	Polar Bear Coolers, International Rhino Foundation
11	Tony Cosentino	Fast Track Racing	Toyota	The Brews Box, Tamayo Sports
12	Stephanie Moyer	Fast Track Racing	Toyota	Evergreen Raceway
15	Jesse Love	Venturini Motorsports	Toyota	Mobil 1
17	Taylor Gray	David Gilliland Racing	Ford	Ripper Coffee Company
18	Ty Gibbs	Joe Gibbs Racing	Toyota	Joe Gibbs Racing
20	Corey Heim	Venturini Motorsports	Toyota	JBL
21	Daniel Dye	GMS Racing	Chevrolet	Race to End Suicide, Solar Fit
23	Sam Mayer	Bret Holmes Racing	Chevrolet	Complex Security Solutions, QPS Employment Group
25	Gracie Trotter	Venturini Motorsports	Toyota	Calico Coatings
27	Alex Clubb	Richmond Clubb Motorsports	Toyota	Richmond Clubb Motorsports
30	Max Gutiérrez	Rette Jones Racing	Ford	ToughBuilt
42	Parker Retzlaff	Cook-Finley Racing	Toyota	Ponsse
46	Thad Moffitt	David Gilliland Racing	Ford	Dirteeze
48	Brad Smith	Brad Smith Motorsports	Chevrolet	Henshaw Automation
54	Joey Iest	David Gilliland Racing	Ford	Basila Ranch, Ag Solutions Network
66	Ron Vandermeir Jr.	Vandermeir Racing	Toyota	Mac Rak Inc.
74	Mason Diaz	Visconti Motorsports	Toyota	Solid Rock Carriers
81	Sammy Smith	Joe Gibbs Racing	Toyota	Engine Ice
Official entry list

== Practice ==
The only 45-minute practice session would occur on Sunday, August 29, at 10:00 a.m. CST. Sammy Smith of Joe Gibbs Racing would set the fastest lap in the session, with a lap of 29.499 and an average speed of 122.038 miles per hour (196.401 km/h).

Pos.	#	Driver	Team	Make	Time	Speed
1	81	Sammy Smith	Joe Gibbs Racing	Toyota	29.499	122.038
2	18	Ty Gibbs	Joe Gibbs Racing	Toyota	29.521	121.947
3	15	Jesse Love	Venturini Motorsports	Toyota	29.947	120.212
Full practice results

== Qualifying ==
Qualifying would occur on Sunday, August 29, at 11:30 a.m. CST. The qualifying system used was a timed session. Ty Gibbs of Joe Gibbs Racing would win the pole, with a lap of 29.354 and an average speed of 122.641 miles per hour (197.372 km/h).

=== Full qualifying results ===
Pos.	#	Driver	Team	Make	Time	Speed
1	18	Ty Gibbs	Joe Gibbs Racing	Toyota	29.354	122.641
2	81	Sammy Smith	Joe Gibbs Racing	Toyota	29.465	122.179
3	21	Daniel Dye	GMS Racing	Chevrolet	29.601	121.618
4	20	Corey Heim	Venturini Motorsports	Toyota	29.627	121.511
5	17	Taylor Gray	David Gilliland Racing	Ford	29.819	120.728
6	2	Nick Sanchez	Rev Racing	Chevrolet	29.826	120.700
7	23	Sam Mayer	Bret Holmes Racing	Chevrolet	29.908	120.369
8	46	Thad Moffitt	David Gilliland Racing	Ford	29.930	120.281
9	15	Jesse Love	Venturini Motorsports	Toyota	29.971	120.116
10	54	Joey Iest	David Gilliland Racing	Ford	30.016	119.936
11	74	Mason Diaz	Visconti Motorsports	Toyota	30.118	119.530
12	30	Max Gutiérrez	Rette Jones Racing	Ford	30.147	119.415
13	25	Gracie Trotter	Venturini Motorsports	Toyota	30.215	119.146
14	66	Ron Vandermier Jr.	Vandermier Racing	Toyota	30.417	118.355
15	6	Rajah Caruth	Rev Racing	Chevrolet	30.529	117.921
16	02	Connor Mosack	Young's Motorsports	Chevrolet	30.912	116.460
17	7	Eric Caudell	CCM Racing	Ford	32.246	111.642
18	12	Stephanie Moyer	Fast Track Racing	Toyota	32.472	110.865
19	01	Jason Miles	Fast Track Racing	Chevrolet	33.295	108.124
20	48	Brad Smith	Brad Smith Motorsports	Chevrolet	33.447	107.633
21	11	Tony Cosentino	Fast Track Racing	Toyota	33.643	107.006
22	10	Arnout Kok	Fast Track Racing	Toyota	—	—
23	42	Parker Retzlaff	Cook-Finley Racing	Toyota	—	—
24	27	Alex Clubb	Richmond Clubb Motorsports	Toyota	—	—
Official qualifying results

== Race results ==
Fin	St	#	Driver	Team	Make	Laps	Led	Status	Pts
1	1	18	Ty Gibbs	Joe Gibbs Racing	Toyota	150	150	running	49
2	7	23	Sam Mayer	Bret Holmes Racing	Chevrolet	150	0	running	42
3	3	21	Daniel Dye	GMS Racing	Chevrolet	150	0	running	41
4	5	17	Taylor Gray	David Gilliland Racing	Ford	150	0	running	40
5	2	81	Sammy Smith	Joe Gibbs Racing	Toyota	150	0	running	39
6	4	20	Corey Heim	Venturini Motorsports	Toyota	150	0	running	38
7	9	15	Jesse Love	Venturini Motorsports	Toyota	150	0	running	37
8	10	54	Joey Iest	David Gilliland Racing	Ford	150	0	running	36
9	8	46	Thad Moffitt	David Gilliland Racing	Ford	150	0	running	35
10	13	25	Gracie Trotter	Venturini Motorsports	Toyota	150	0	running	34
11	23	42	Parker Retzlaff	Cook-Finley Racing	Toyota	150	0	running	33
12	6	2	Nick Sanchez	Rev Racing	Chevrolet	150	0	running	32
13	15	6	Rajah Caruth	Rev Racing	Chevrolet	150	0	running	31
14	14	66	Ron Vandermier Jr.	Vandermier Racing	Toyota	149	0	running	30
15	12	30	Max Gutiérrez	Rette Jones Racing	Ford	148	0	running	29
16	16	02	Connor Mosack	Young's Motorsports	Chevrolet	147	0	running	28
17	24	27	Alex Clubb	Richmond Clubb Motorsports	Toyota	143	0	running	27
18	19	01	Jason Miles	Fast Track Racing	Chevrolet	141	0	running	26
19	11	74	Mason Diaz	Visconti Motorsports	Toyota	140	0	running	25
20	18	12	Stephanie Moyer	Fast Track Racing	Toyota	139	0	running	24
21	17	7	Eric Caudell	CCM Racing	Ford	31	0	radiator	23
22	20	48	Brad Smith	Brad Smith Motorsports	Chevrolet	14	0	handling	22
23	21	11	Tony Cosentino	Fast Track Racing	Toyota	8	0	vibration	21
24	22	10	Arnout Kok	Fast Track Racing	Toyota	0	0	did not start	3

Previous race: 2021 Allen Crowe 100	ARCA Menards Series; 2021 season	Next race: 2021 Southern Illinois 100

Previous race: 2021 Shore Lunch 150	ARCA Menards Series East; 2021 season	Next race: 2021 Bush's Beans 200
