= 2019 Music City 200 =

5th race of the 2019 ARCA Menards Series

Race details
- Race 5 of 20 of the 2019 ARCA Menards Series
- Date: May 5, 2019
- Official name: 5th Annual Music City 200
- Location: Nashville Fairgrounds Speedway, Nashville, Tennessee
- Course: Permanent racing facility
- Course length: 0.959 km (0.596 miles)
- Distance: 200 laps, 119 mi (192 km)
- Scheduled distance: 200 laps, 119 mi (192 km)
- Average speed: 95.893 mph (154.325 km/h)

Pole position
Driver	Chandler Smith	Venturini Motorsports
- Grid positions set by competition-based formula

Most laps led
Driver	Christian Eckes	Venturini Motorsports
- Laps: 120

Winner
No. 15	Christian Eckes	Venturini Motorsports

Television in the United States
- Network: MAVTV
- Announcers: Bob Dillner and Jim Tretow

Radio in the United States
- Radio: ARCA Racing Network

The 2019 Music City 200 was the fifth stock car race of the 2019 ARCA Menards Series season, and the 5th iteration of the event. The race was originally scheduled to be held on Saturday, May 4, 2019, but was postponed until Sunday, May 5, due to constant rain showers. The race was held in Nashville, Tennessee, at Nashville Fairgrounds Speedway, a 0.596 mile (0.959 km) permanent oval shaped racetrack. The race took the scheduled 200 laps to complete. Christian Eckes, driving for Venturini Motorsports, would put on a blistering performance, leading a race-high 120 laps and earning his fourth career ARCA Menards Series win, and his first of the season. To fill out the podium, Ty Gibbs, driving for Joe Gibbs Racing, and Chandler Smith, driving for Venturini Motorsports, would finish 2nd and 3rd, respectively.

== Background ==
Nashville Fairgrounds Speedway is a motorsport racetrack located at the Nashville Fairgrounds near downtown Nashville, Tennessee. The track is the second-oldest continually operating track in the United States. The track held NASCAR Grand National/Winston Cup (now NASCAR Cup Series) races from 1958 to 1984.

=== Entry list ===
- (R) denotes rookie driver.

#	Driver	Team	Make	Sponsor
1	Dick Doheny	Fast Track Racing	Chevrolet	Fast Track Racing
2	Eric Caudell	CCM Racing	Dodge	CCM, Driven Race Wax
06	Tim Richmond (R)	Wayne Peterson Racing	Dodge	GreatRailing.com
10	Tommy Vigh Jr. (R)	Fast Track Racing	Ford	Extreme Kleaner
11	Mike Basham	Fast Track Racing	Ford	Ashville Propane, Ohio Ag Equipment
14	Connor Okrzesik	Connor Okrzesik Racing	Chevrolet	Metro Glass, Insinger Performance
15	Christian Eckes (R)	Venturini Motorsports	Toyota	JBL
18	Ty Gibbs	Joe Gibbs Racing	Toyota	Monster Energy, Terrible Herbst
20	Chandler Smith	Venturini Motorsports	Toyota	Craftsman
22	Corey Heim (R)	Chad Bryant Racing	Ford	Speedway Children's Charities
23	Bret Holmes	Bret Holmes Racing	Chevrolet	Holmes II Excavation
25	Michael Self	Venturini Motorsports	Toyota	Sinclair Oil Corporation
27	Travis Braden	RFMS Racing	Ford	MatrixCare, Consonus Healthcare
28	Carson Hocevar (R)	KBR Development	Chevrolet	Scott's, GM Parts Now
38	Kaden Honeycutt	Kaden Honeycutt Racing	Ford	C&S Trailers, Kearny Trailers
44	Lexi Gay	Empire Racing	Ford	Gordo's Cheese Dip & Salsa
46	Thad Moffitt	Empire Racing	Chevrolet	Empire Racing Group
48	Brad Smith	Brad Smith Motorsports	Ford	Copraya.com
69	Barry Layne	Kimmel Racing	Ford	Kimmel Racing
77	Joe Graf Jr.	Chad Bryant Racing	Ford	Eat Sleep Race
Official entry list

== Practice ==
The first and only practice session was held on Saturday, May 4, at 2:15 PM EST, and would last for 30 minutes. Chandler Smith, driving for Venturini Motorsports, would set the fastest time in the session, with a lap of 19.349, and an average speed of 110.889 mph (178.459 km/h).

Pos.	#	Driver	Team	Make	Time	Speed
1	20	Chandler Smith	Venturini Motorsports	Toyota	19.349	110.889
2	18	Ty Gibbs	Joe Gibbs Racing	Toyota	19.376	110.735
3	15	Christian Eckes (R)	Venturini Motorsports	Toyota	19.377	110.729

== Qualifying ==
Qualifying was originally scheduled to be held on Saturday, May 4, at 5:15 PM EST. The qualifying system used is a single-car, two-lap system with only one round. Whoever sets the fastest time in that round will win the pole.

Qualifying was cancelled due to inclement weather. The starting lineup was determined by practice speeds. As a result, Chandler Smith, driving for Venturini Motorsports, would earn the pole for the race.

Pos.	#	Driver	Team	Make
1	20	Chandler Smith	Venturini Motorsports	Toyota
2	18	Ty Gibbs	Joe Gibbs Racing	Toyota
3	15	Christian Eckes (R)	Venturini Motorsports	Toyota
4	23	Bret Holmes	Bret Holmes Racing	Chevrolet
5	25	Michael Self	Venturini Motorsports	Toyota
6	38	Kaden Honeycutt	Kaden Honeycutt Racing	Ford
7	22	Corey Heim (R)	Chad Bryant Racing	Ford
8	27	Travis Braden	RFMS Racing	Ford
9	28	Carson Hocevar (R)	KBR Development	Chevrolet
10	77	Joe Graf Jr.	Chad Bryant Racing	Ford
11	14	Connor Okrzesik	Connor Okrzesik Racing	Chevrolet
12	44	Lexi Gay	Empire Racing	Ford
13	46	Thad Moffitt	Empire Racing	Chevrolet
14	06	Tim Richmond (R)	Wayne Peterson Racing	Dodge
15	1	Dick Doheny	Fast Track Racing	Chevrolet
16	11	Mike Basham	Fast Track Racing	Ford
17	2	Eric Caudell	CCM Racing	Dodge
18	10	Tommy Vigh Jr. (R)	Fast Track Racing	Ford
19	48	Brad Smith	Brad Smith Motorsports	Ford
20	69	Barry Layne	Kimmel Racing	Ford
Official qualifying results

== Race results ==
Fin	St	#	Driver	Team	Make	Laps	Led	Status	Pts
1	3	15	Christian Eckes (R)	Venturini Motorsports	Toyota	200	120	Running	245
2	2	18	Ty Gibbs	Joe Gibbs Racing	Toyota	200	0	Running	220
3	1	20	Chandler Smith	Venturini Motorsports	Toyota	200	76	Running	230
4	9	28	Carson Hocevar (R)	KBR Development	Chevrolet	200	0	Running	210
5	4	23	Bret Holmes	Bret Holmes Racing	Chevrolet	200	0	Running	205
6	10	77	Joe Graf Jr.	Chad Bryant Racing	Ford	200	0	Running	200
7	6	38	Kaden Honeycutt	Kaden Honeycutt Racing	Ford	199	0	Running	195
8	8	27	Travis Braden	RFMS Racing	Ford	199	0	Running	190
9	13	46	Thad Moffitt	Empire Racing	Chevrolet	198	0	Running	185
10	11	14	Connor Okrzesik	Connor Okrzesik Racing	Chevrolet	195	0	Running	180
11	7	22	Corey Heim (R)	Chad Bryant Racing	Ford	193	4	Running	180
12	18	10	Tommy Vigh Jr. (R)	Fast Track Racing	Ford	186	0	Running	170
13	14	06	Tim Richmond (R)	Wayne Peterson Racing	Dodge	131	0	Exhaust	165
14	17	2	Eric Caudell	CCM Racing	Dodge	112	0	Oil Leak	160
15	5	25	Michael Self	Venturini Motorsports	Toyota	72	0	Accident	155
16	16	11	Mike Basham	Fast Track Racing	Ford	38	0	Handling	150
17	15	1	Dick Doheny	Fast Track Racing	Chevrolet	6	0	Electrical	145
18	20	69	Barry Layne	Kimmel Racing	Ford	4	0	Brakes	140
19	12	44	Lexi Gay	Empire Racing	Ford	3	0	Suspension	135
20	19	48	Brad Smith	Brad Smith Motorsports	Ford	0	0	Engine	130
Official race results

Previous race: 2019 General Tire 200	ARCA Menards Series; 2019 season	Next race: 2019 Sioux Chief PowerPEX 200
