= 2019 Kentuckiana Ford Dealers ARCA 200 =

Race details
- Race 3 of 20 of the 2019 ARCA Menards Series
- Date: April 14, 2019
- Official name: 24th Annual Kentuckiana Ford Dealers ARCA 200
- Location: Salem, Indiana, Salem Speedway
- Course: Permanent racing facility
- Course length: 0.893 km (0.555 miles)
- Distance: 101 laps, 56.055 mi (90.212 km)
- Scheduled distance: 200 laps, 111 mi (179 km)
- Average speed: 89.887 miles per hour (144.659 km/h)

Pole position
Driver	Carson Hocevar	KBR Development
- Time: 17.073

Most laps led
Driver	Michael Self	Venturini Motorsports
- Laps: 72

Winner
No. 25	Michael Self	Venturini Motorsports

Television in the United States
- Network: MAVTV
- Announcers: Bob Dillner, Jim Tretow

Radio in the United States
- Radio: ARCA Racing Network

The 2019 Kentuckiana Ford Dealers ARCA 200 was the third stock car race of the 2019 ARCA Menards Series season and the 24th iteration of the event. The race was held on Sunday, April 14, 2019, in Salem, Indiana at Salem Speedway, a 0.555 miles (0.893 km) permanent paved oval-shaped racetrack. The race was shortened from its scheduled 200 laps to 101 laps due to rain. Venturini Motorsports driver Michael Self would dominate the race until the caution came out on lap 98, with the race being officially called three laps later. The race was Self's fifth career ARCA Menards Series win, his second of the season, and his second consecutive win. To fill out the podium, Sam Mayer of GMS Racing and Carson Hocevar of KBR Development would finish second and third, respectively.

== Background ==
Salem Speedway is a .555 miles (0.893 km) long paved oval motor racetrack in Washington Township, Washington County, near Salem, Indiana, approximately 100 miles (160 km) south of Indianapolis. The track has 33° degrees of banking in the corners. Major auto racing series that run at Salem are ARCA and USAC.

=== Entry list ===
#	Driver	Team	Make	Sponsor
1	Dick Doheny	Fast Track Racing	Chevrolet	Fast Track Racing
03	Alex Clubb	Clubb Racing	Ford	A. Clubb Lawn Care & Landscaping
06	Tim Richmond	Wayne Peterson Racing	Dodge	Great Railing
10	Tommy Vigh Jr.	Fast Track Racing	Ford	Extreme Kleaner
11	Morgen Baird	Fast Track Racing	Ford	Ohio Ag Equipment, Ashville Propane
15	Christian Eckes*	Venturini Motorsports	Toyota	JBL
18	Ty Gibbs	Joe Gibbs Racing	Toyota	Monster Energy
20	Chandler Smith	Venturini Motorsports	Toyota	Craftsman
21	Sam Mayer	GMS Racing	Chevrolet	Chevrolet Accessories
22	Corey Heim	Chad Bryant Racing	Ford	Carbon Racing Solutions, Speedway Children's Charities
23	Bret Holmes	Bret Holmes Racing	Chevrolet	Holmes II Excavating
25	Michael Self	Venturini Motorsports	Toyota	Sinclair
27	Travis Braden	RFMS Racing	Ford	MatrixCare
28	Carson Hocevar	KBR Development	Chevrolet	Scott's Sports Cards, Coins, & Jewelry
34	Darrell Basham	Darrell Basham Racing	Chevrolet	Darrell Basham Racing
48	Brad Smith	Brad Smith Motorsports	Ford	HIE Publishing, Copraya
54	Tanner Gray	DGR-Crosley	Toyota	Valvoline
68	Will Kimmel**	Kimmel Racing	Ford	Kimmel Racing
69	Mike Basham	Kimmel Racing	Ford	Kimmel Racing
77	Joe Graf Jr.	Chad Bryant Racing	Ford	Eat Sleep Race
Official entry list

== Practice ==
The only 90-minute practice session was held on Saturday, April 13, at 11:00 AM EST. Ty Gibbs of Joe Gibbs Racing would set the fastest time in the session, with a time of 17.032 and an average speed of 117.309 miles per hour (188.791 km/h).

Pos.	#	Driver	Team	Make	Time	Speed
1	18	Ty Gibbs	Joe Gibbs Racing	Toyota	17.032	117.309
2	28	Carson Hocevar	KBR Development	Chevrolet	17.044	117.226
3	20	Chandler Smith	Venturini Motorsports	Toyota	17.072	117.034
Full practice results

== Qualifying ==
Qualifying was held on Saturday, April 13, at 3:00 PM EST. Each driver would have two laps to set a fastest time; the fastest of the two would count as their official qualifying lap.

Carson Hocevar of KBR Development would win the pole, setting a time of 17.073 and an average speed of 117.027 miles per hour (188.337 km/h).

=== Full qualifying results ===
Pos.	#	Driver	Team	Make	Time	Speed
1	28	Carson Hocevar	KBR Development	Chevrolet	17.073	117.027
2	15	Harrison Burton	Venturini Motorsports	Toyota	17.169	116.373
3	18	Ty Gibbs	Joe Gibbs Racing	Toyota	17.171	116.359
4	25	Michael Self	Venturini Motorsports	Toyota	17.175	116.332
5	77	Joe Graf Jr.	Chad Bryant Racing	Ford	17.184	116.271
6	22	Corey Heim	Chad Bryant Racing	Ford	17.239	115.900
7	20	Chandler Smith	Venturini Motorsports	Toyota	17.269	115.699
8	54	Tanner Gray	DGR-Crosley	Toyota	17.277	115.645
9	21	Sam Mayer	GMS Racing	Chevrolet	17.314	115.398
10	23	Bret Holmes	Bret Holmes Racing	Chevrolet	17.417	114.716
11	27	Travis Braden	RFMS Racing	Ford	17.505	114.139
12	10	Tommy Vigh Jr.	Fast Track Racing	Ford	18.512	107.930
13	1	Dick Doheny	Fast Track Racing	Chevrolet	19.399	102.995
14	06	Tim Richmond	Wayne Peterson Racing	Dodge	19.465	102.646
15	11	Morgen Baird	Fast Track Racing	Ford	19.591	101.986
16	69	Mike Basham	Kimmel Racing	Ford	19.708	101.380
17	34	Darrell Basham	Darrell Basham Racing	Chevrolet	19.887	100.468
18	03	Alex Clubb	Clubb Racing	Ford	20.025	99.775
19	48	Brad Smith	Brad Smith Motorsports	Ford	—	—
Withdrew
WD	68	Will Kimmel	Kimmel Racing	Ford	—	—
Official qualifying results

== Race results ==
Fin	St	#	Driver	Team	Make	Laps	Led	Status	Pts
1	4	25	Michael Self	Venturini Motorsports	Toyota	101	72	running	245
2	9	21	Sam Mayer	GMS Racing	Chevrolet	101	0	running	220
3	1	28	Carson Hocevar	KBR Development	Chevrolet	101	26	running	225
4	7	20	Chandler Smith	Venturini Motorsports	Toyota	101	3	running	215
5	6	22	Corey Heim	Chad Bryant Racing	Ford	101	0	running	205
6	3	18	Ty Gibbs	Joe Gibbs Racing	Toyota	100	0	running	200
7	8	54	Tanner Gray	DGR-Crosley	Toyota	100	0	running	195
8	2	15	Harrison Burton	Venturini Motorsports	Toyota	100	0	running	190
9	5	77	Joe Graf Jr.	Chad Bryant Racing	Ford	100	0	running	185
10	10	23	Bret Holmes	Bret Holmes Racing	Chevrolet	100	0	running	180
11	12	10	Tommy Vigh Jr.	Fast Track Racing	Ford	97	0	running	175
12	11	27	Travis Braden	RFMS Racing	Ford	94	0	running	170
13	17	34	Darrell Basham	Darrell Basham Racing	Chevrolet	93	0	running	165
14	14	06	Tim Richmond	Wayne Peterson Racing	Dodge	93	0	running	160
15	18	03	Alex Clubb	Clubb Racing	Ford	90	0	running	155
16	15	11	Morgen Baird	Fast Track Racing	Ford	34	0	radio	150
17	16	69	Mike Basham	Kimmel Racing	Ford	8	0	clutch	145
18	13	1	Dick Doheny	Fast Track Racing	Chevrolet	3	0	brakes	140
19	19	48	Brad Smith	Brad Smith Motorsports	Ford	1	0	oil pump	135
Withdrew
WD		68	Will Kimmel	Kimmel Racing	Ford				
Official race results

== Standings after the race ==
Drivers' Championship standings

	Pos	Driver	Points
1	1	Travis Braden	540
3	2	Michael Self	535 (-5)
	3	Bret Holmes	520 (-20)
	4	Joe Graf Jr.	485 (-55)
4	5	Christian Eckes	460 (-80)
1	6	Tommy Vigh Jr.	455 (-85)
2	7	Chandler Smith	435 (-105)
	8	Harrison Burton	435 (-105)
1	9	Ty Gibbs	425 (-115)
4	10	Brad Smith	420 (-120)

- Note: Only the first 10 positions are included for the driver standings.

Previous race: 2019 ARCA Pensacola 200	ARCA Menards Series; 2019 season	Next race: 2019 General Tire 200
