= Cole Glasson =

American racing driver

- Born: July 5, 2000 (age 26); Corinth, Texas, U.S.

ARCA Menards Series career
- 2 races run over 2 years
- Best finish: 63rd (2019)
- First race: 2018 Kansas ARCA 150 (Kansas)
- Last race: 2019 General Tire#AnywhereIsPossible 200 (Pocono)
Wins	Top tens	Poles
0	2	0
- Statistics up to date as of January 31, 2025.

Cole Glasson (born July 5, 2000) is an American professional stock car racing driver who has previously competed in the ARCA Menards Series from 2018 to 2019.

Glasson has also previously competed in series such as the CARS Late Model Stock Tour, the CRA JEGS All-Stars Tour, the SouthEast Super Trucks Series, and the NASCAR Advance Auto Parts Weekly Series.

== Motorsports results ==
=== ARCA Menards Series ===
(key) (Bold – Pole position awarded by qualifying time. Italics – Pole position earned by points standings or practice time. * – Most laps led.)

ARCA Menards Series results
Year	Team	No.	Make	1	2	3	4	5	6	7	8	9	10	11	12	13	14	15	16	17	18	19	20	AMSC	Pts	Ref
2018	Win-Tron Racing	33	Chevy	DAY	NSH	SLM	TAL	TOL	CLT	POC	MCH	MAD	GTW	CHI	IOW	ELK	POC	ISF	BLN	DSF	SLM	IRP	KAN; 10	80th	180	
2019	Win-Tron Racing	32	Chevy	DAY	FIF	SLM	TAL	NSH	TOL	CLT; Wth	POC; 9	MCH	MAD	GTW	CHI	ELK	IOW	POC	ISF	DSF	SLM	IRP	KAN	63rd	185	

=== CARS Late Model Stock Car Tour ===
(key) (Bold – Pole position awarded by qualifying time. Italics – Pole position earned by points standings or practice time. * – Most laps led. ** – All laps led.)

CARS Late Model Stock Car Tour results
Year	Team	No.	Make	1	2	3	4	5	6	7	8	9	10	11	12	CLMSCTC	Pts	Ref
2018	Lee Faulk Racing	5G	Chevy	TCM	MYB	ROU	HCY; 10	BRI	ACE	CCS	KPT				SBO; 22	23rd	56	
2018	Lee Faulk Racing	36	Chevy									HCY; 11	WKS	ROU		23rd	56	
2019	Lee Faulk Racing	5	Chevy	SNM	HCY	ROU	ACE	MMS	LGY	DOM	CCS	HCY; 12	ROU	SBO		47th	21	
