= Chuck Hiers =

American racing driver (born 1959)

- Born: April 21, 1959 (age 67); Jacksonville, Florida, U.S.

ARCA Menards Series career
- 7 races run over 7 years
- Best finish: 65th (2019)
- First race: 2003 EasyCare Vehicle Service Contracts 200 (Charlotte)
- Last race: 2022 Lucas Oil 200 (Daytona)
Wins	Top tens	Poles
0	0	0

ARCA Menards Series East career
- 1 race run over 1 year
- Best finish: 51st (2020)
- First race: 2020 New Smyrna 175 (New Smyrna)
Wins	Top tens	Poles
0	0	0
- Statistics up to date as of April 26, 2022.

Chuck Hiers (born April 21, 1959) is an American professional stock car racing driver. He last competed part-time in the ARCA Menards Series, driving the No. 11 Toyota Camry for Fast Track Racing.

== Racing career ==
=== ARCA Menards Series ===
Hiers made his ARCA Menards Series debut in 2003 at Charlotte Motor Speedway. Hiers finished 32nd in his series debut. Hiers returned in 2004 at Daytona International Speedway, finishing 30th. Hiers did not return to the series until 2018 at Daytona, finishing sixteenth. The following year, he had his best career finish, fourteenth at Daytona.

== Motorsports career results ==
=== ARCA Menards Series ===
ARCA Menards Series results
Year	Team	No.	Make	1	2	3	4	5	6	7	8	9	10	11	12	13	14	15	16	17	18	19	20	21	22	AMSC	Pts	Ref
2003	Fast Track Racing	7	Dodge	DAY	ATL	NSH	SLM	TOL	KEN	CLT	BLN	KAN	MCH	LER	POC	POC	NSH	ISF	WIN	DSF	CHI	SLM	TAL	CLT; 32	SBO	142nd	140	
2004	Chuck Hiers	62	Pontiac	DAY; 30	NSH	SLM	KEN	TOL	CLT	KAN	POC	MCH	SBO	BLN	KEN	GTW	POC	LER	NSH	ISF	TOL	DSF	CHI	SLM	TAL	166th	80	
2018	Fast Track Racing	06	Toyota	DAY; 16	NSH	SLM	TAL	TOL	CLT	POC	MCH	MAD	GTW	CHI	IOW	ELK	POC	ISF	BLN	DSF	SLM	IRP	KAN			92nd	155	
2019	Fast Track Racing	1	Toyota	DAY; 14	FIF	SLM	TAL	NSH	TOL	CLT	POC	MCH	MAD	GTW	CHI	ELK	IOW	POC	ISF	DSF	SLM	IRP	KAN			65th	160	
2020	Fast Track Racing	11	Toyota	DAY; 19	PHO	TAL	POC	IRP	KEN	IOW	KAN	TOL	TOL	MCH	DAY	GTW	L44	TOL	BRI	WIN	MEM	ISF	KAN			81st	25	
2021	Fast Track Racing	01	Toyota	DAY; 25	PHO	TAL	KAN	TOL	CLT	MOH	POC	ELK	BLN	IOW	WIN	GLN	MCH	ISF	MLW	DSF	BRI	SLM	KAN			114th	19	
2022	Fast Track Racing	11	Toyota	DAY; 15	PHO	TAL	KAN	CLT	IOW	BLN	ELK	MOH	POC	IRP	MCH	GLN	ISF	MLW	DSF	KAN	BRI	SLM	TOL			92nd	29	

==== ARCA Menards Series East ====
ARCA Menards Series East results
Year	Team	No.	Make	1	2	3	4	5	6	AMSEC	Pts	Ref
2020	Fast Track Racing	11	Toyota	NSM; 22	TOL	DOV	TOL	BRI	FIF	51st	22	
