= Dick Doheny =

American racing driver (born 1959)

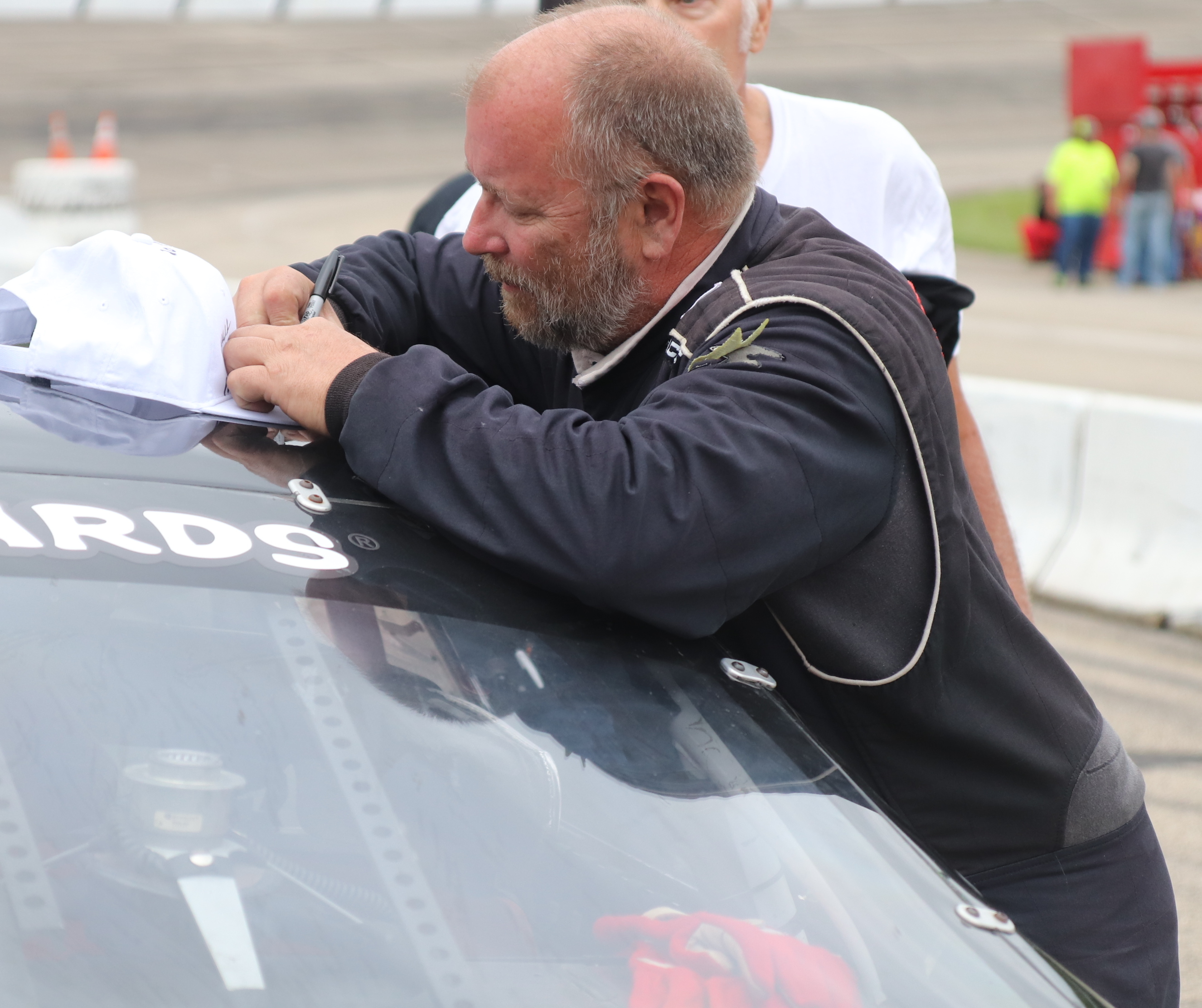
- Doheny signing autographs before the ARCA race at Madison in 2019
- Born: Richard Doheny; March 29, 1959 (age 67); Ballston Spa, New York, U.S.

ARCA Menards Series career
- 45 races run over 10 years
- Best finish: 9th (2019)
- First race: 2013 ModSpace 125 (Pocono)
- Last race: 2022 General Tire 150 (Charlotte)
Wins	Top tens	Poles
0	1	0

ARCA Menards Series East career
- 4 races run over 1 year
- Best finish: 16th (2021)
- First race: 2021 Jeep Beach 175 (New Smyrna)
- Last race: 2021 General Tire 125 (Dover)
Wins	Top tens	Poles
0	0	0
- Statistics up to date as of October 18, 2022.

Richard Doheny (born March 29, 1959) is an American professional stock car racing driver and crew chief who last competed part-time in the ARCA Menards Series and ARCA Menards Series East for Fast Track Racing. He also serves as a crew chief for the team when he is not driving.

== Racing career ==
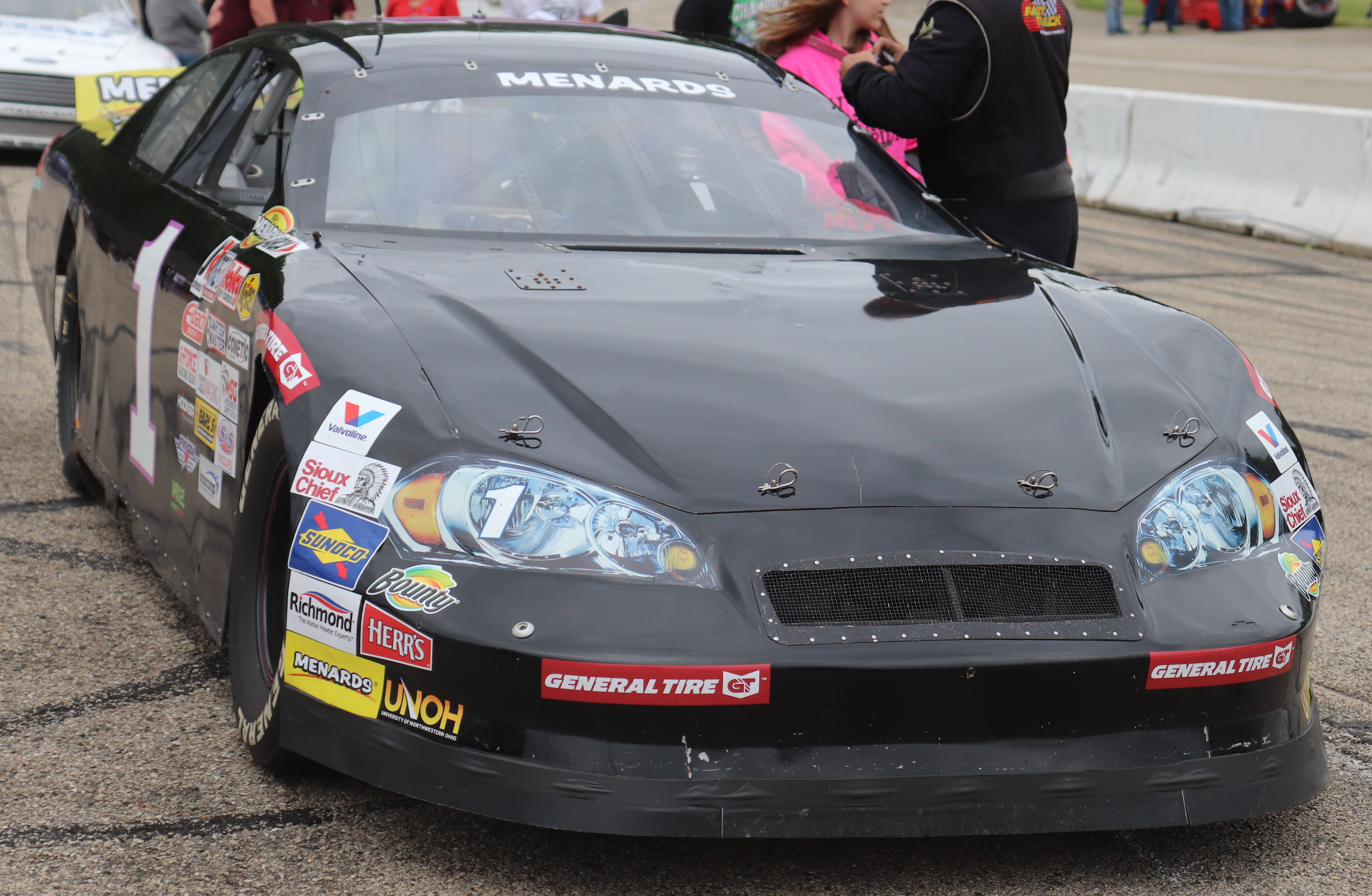
Doheny's No. 1 car for Fast Track Racing on pit road before the ARCA race at Madison in 2019

Doheny made his ARCA Racing Series start in 2013 in Pocono with Fast Track Racing, where he would finish 33rd after running only six laps due an axle issue. He would return with the team the following year at the season opener at Daytona, finishing 30th due to a battery problem.

Doheny would remain with Fast Track from 2015 through 2018 primarily driving various start and park entries.

For the 2019 season, Doheny would continue with Fast Track, and would run sixteen of the twenty races on the schedule finishing ninth in the standings with a best finish of twelfth at Springfield, which was the only race he finished. It was during this year that Doheny would serve as the crew chief for multiple drivers alongside his driving duties. He would run three races in 2020 with a best finish of thirteenth at Kentucky, and would continue serving as a crew chief.

In 2021, Doheny would run three races, and achieved his first top-ten with a tenth place finish at Toledo. He would once again serve as a crew chief for Fast Track, primarily for D. L. Wilson. Doheny would also run the first four races of the ARCA Menards Series East season.

== Personal life ==
Outside of racing, Doheny owns and operates a small building mechanical business that focuses on HVAC design and building automation.

== Motorsports career results ==
=== Stock car career summary ===
Season	Series	Team	Races	Wins	Top 5	Top 10	Points	Position
2013	ARCA Racing Series	Fast Track Racing	1	0	0	0	65	136th
2014	ARCA Racing Series	Fast Track Racing	1	0	0	0	80	140th
2015	ARCA Racing Series	Fast Track Racing	3	0	0	0	310	75th
2016	ARCA Racing Series	Fast Track Racing	7	0	0	0	800	34th
2016	ARCA Racing Series	Max Force Racing	1	0	0	0	800	34th
2017	ARCA Racing Series	Fast Track Racing	2	0	0	0	260	69th
2018	ARCA Racing Series	Fast Track Racing	7	0	0	0	945	24th
2019	ARCA Menards Series	Fast Track Racing	16	0	0	0	2750	9th
2020	ARCA Menards Series	Fast Track Racing	3	0	0	0	80	41st
2021	ARCA Menards Series East	Fast Track Racing	4	0	0	0	122	16th
2021	ARCA Menards Series	Fast Track Racing	3	0	0	1	90	41st
2022	ARCA Menards Series	Fast Track Racing	1	0	0	0	22	109th

=== ARCA Menards Series ===
(key) (Bold – Pole position awarded by qualifying time. Italics – Pole position earned by points standings or practice time. * – Most laps led.)

ARCA Menards Series results
Year	Team	No.	Make	1	2	3	4	5	6	7	8	9	10	11	12	13	14	15	16	17	18	19	20	21	AMSC	Pts	Ref
2013	Fast Track Racing	11	Ford	DAY	MOB	SLM	TAL	TOL	ELK	POC	MCH	ROA	WIN	CHI	NJM	POC; 33	BLN	ISF	MAD	DSF	IOW	SLM	KEN	KAN	136th	65	
2014	Fast Track Racing	10	Chevy	DAY; 30	MOB	SLM	TAL	TOL	NJM	POC	MCH	ELK	WIN	CHI	IRP	POC	BLN	ISF	MAD	DSF	SLM	KEN	KAN		140th	80	
2015	Fast Track Racing	10	Ford	DAY	MOB; 22	NSH	SLM	TAL	TOL; 25	NJE	POC	MCH	CHI	WIN	IOW	IRP	POC	BLN	ISF	DSF	SLM	KEN			75th	310	
2015	Fast Track Racing	11	Ford																				KAN; 29		75th	310	
2016	Fast Track Racing	27	Chevy	DAY; 30	NSH		TAL; 34	TOL	NJE																34th	800	
2016	Fast Track Racing	10	Ford			SLM; 26																			34th	800	
2016	Fast Track Racing	27	Ford							POC; 35															34th	800	
2016	Fast Track Racing	10	Chevy								MCH; 26	MAD	WIN; 15	IOW	IRP	POC	BLN	ISF							34th	800	
2016	Max Force Racing	27	Ford																DSF; 23						34th	800	
2016	Fast Track Racing	11	Ford																	SLM; 24	CHI	KEN	KAN		34th	800	
2017	Fast Track Racing	10	Ford	DAY	NSH	SLM	TAL	TOL	ELK	POC	MCH	MAD; 21	IOW	IRP	POC	WIN	ISF	ROA	DSF	SLM	CHI	KEN; 19	KAN		69th	260	
2018	Fast Track Racing	10	Ford	DAY	NSH	SLM; 22	TAL	TOL	CLT	POC	MCH	MAD													24th	945	
2018	Fast Track Racing	11	Ford										GTW; 21	CHI	IOW; 21	ELK; 16	POC	ISF; 20	BLN; 17	DSF; 21	SLM	IRP	KAN		24th	945	
2019	Fast Track Racing	1	Chevy	DAY	FIF; 19	SLM; 18	TAL	NSH; 17	TOL; 15				MAD; 17			ELK; 18	IOW		ISF; 12	DSF; 19	SLM; 20				9th	2750	
2019	Fast Track Racing	1	Toyota							CLT; 24															9th	2750	
2019	Fast Track Racing	11	Toyota								POC; 18							POC; 18							9th	2750	
2019	Fast Track Racing	1	Ford									MCH; 18		GTW; 14	CHI								KAN; 21		9th	2750	
2019	Fast Track Racing	11	Chevy																			IRP; 18			9th	2750	
2020	Fast Track Racing	12	Chevy	DAY	PHO	TAL	POC	IRP; 18	KEN; 13																41st	80	
2020	Fast Track Racing	11	Chevy							IOW; 21	KAN	TOL	TOL	MCH	DAY	GTW	I44	TOL	BRI	WIN	MEM	ISF	KAN		41st	80	
2021	Fast Track Racing	11	Toyota	DAY	PHO	TAL	KAN; 17																		41st	90	
2021	Fast Track Racing	10	Toyota					TOL; 10	CLT	MOH	POC														41st	90	
2021	Fast Track Racing	12	Toyota									ELK; 15	BLN	IOW	WIN	GLN	MCH	ISF	MLW	DSF	BRI	SLM	KAN		41st	90	
2022	Fast Track Racing	01	Ford	DAY	PHO	TAL	KAN	CLT; 22	IOW	BLN	ELK	MOH	POC	IRP	MCH	GLN	ISF	MLW	DSF	KAN	BRI	SLM	TOL		109th	22	

==== ARCA Menards Series East ====
ARCA Menards Series East results
Year	Team	No.	Make	1	2	3	4	5	6	7	8	AMSEC	Pts	Ref
2021	Fast Track Racing	10	Toyota	NSM; 15	FIF; 12	NSV; 12						16th	122	
2021	Fast Track Racing	12	Toyota				DOV; 15	SNM	IOW	MLW	BRI	16th	122	
