= Lexi Gay =

American racing driver

- Born: January 12, 2001 (age 25); Canton, Georgia, U.S.

ARCA Menards Series career
- 1 race run over 1 year
- Best finish: 76th (2019)
- First race: 2019 Music City 200 (Nashville)
Wins	Top tens	Poles
0	0	0
- Statistics up to date as of February 4, 2025.

Lexi Gay (born January 12, 2001) is an American professional stock car racing driver who has competed in the ARCA Menards Series.

Gay has also previously competed in the Southern National Late Model Series, Southeast Limited Late Model Series, the Paramount Kia Big 10 Challenge, the Thursday Thunder Legends Racing Series, and the NASCAR Advance Auto Parts Weekly Series.

== Motorsports results ==
=== ARCA Menards Series ===
(key) (Bold – Pole position awarded by qualifying time. Italics – Pole position earned by points standings or practice time. * – Most laps led.)

ARCA Menards Series results
Year	Team	No.	Make	1	2	3	4	5	6	7	8	9	10	11	12	13	14	15	16	17	18	19	20	AMSC	Pts	Ref
2019	Empire Racing	44	Ford	DAY	FIF	SLM	TAL	NSH; 19	TOL	CLT	POC	MCH	MAD	GTW	CHI	ELK	IOW	POC	ISF	DSF	SLM	IRP	KAN	76th	135	
