= Barry Layne =

American racing driver

- Born: February 15, 1965 (age 61); Mims, Florida, U.S.

ARCA Menards Series career
- 6 races run over 5 years
- Best finish: 75th (2019)
- First race: 2008 Prairie Meadows 250 (Iowa)
- Last race: 2019 Music City 200 (Nashville)
Wins	Top tens	Poles
0	0	0
- Statistics up to date as of February 4, 2025.

Barry Layne (born February 15, 1965) is an American professional stock car racing driver who has competed in the ARCA Menards Series from 2008 to 2019.

== Motorsports results ==
=== ARCA Menards Series ===
(key) (Bold – Pole position awarded by qualifying time. Italics – Pole position earned by points standings or practice time. * – Most laps led.)

ARCA Menards Series results
Year	Team	No.	Make	1	2	3	4	5	6	7	8	9	10	11	12	13	14	15	16	17	18	19	20	21	AMSC	Pts	Ref
2008	Norm Benning Racing	8	Chevy	DAY	SLM	IOW; 40	KAN	CAR	KEN	TOL	POC	MCH	CAY	KEN	BLN	POC	NSH	ISF	DSF	CHI	SLM	NJE	TAL	TOL	157th	30	
2014	Finney Racing Enterprises	80	Chevy	DAY	MOB	SLM; 24	TAL	TOL	NJE	POC	MCH	ELK	WIN	CHI											82nd	195	
2014	Finney Racing Enterprises	8	Chevy												IRP; 29	POC	BLN	ISF	MAD	DSF	SLM	KEN	KAN		82nd	195	
2016	Kimmel Racing	68	Ford	DAY	NSH; 34																				115th	145	
2016	Kimmel Racing	69	Ford			SLM; 29	TAL	TOL	NJE	POC	MCH	MAD	WIN	IOW	IRP	POC	BLN	ISF	DSF	SLM	CHI	KEN	KAN		115th	145	
2017	Kimmel Racing	08	Ford	DAY	NSH; Wth	SLM	TAL	TOL	ELK	POC	MCH	MAD	IOW	IRP	POC	WIN	ISF	ROA	DSF	SLM	CHI	KEN	KAN		N/A	0	
2019	Kimmel Racing	69	Ford	DAY	FIF	SLM	TAL	NSH; 18	TOL	CLT	POC	MCH	MAD	GTW	CHI	ELK	IOW	POC	ISF	DSF	SLM	IRP	KAN		75th	140	
