= Connor Okrzesik =

American racing driver

Connor Orkzesik
- Born: October 24, 2001 (age 25); Grand Bay, Alabama, U.S.

ARCA Menards Series career
- 2 races run over 1 year
- Best finish: 46th (2019)
- First race: 2019 Pensacola 200 (Pensacola)
- Last race: 2019 Music City 200 (Nashville)
Wins	Top tens	Poles
0	2	0

ARCA Menards Series East career
- 1 race run over 1 year
- Best finish: 24th (2020)
- First race: 2020 Pensacola 200 Pres. by Inspectra Thermal Solutions (Pensacola)
Wins	Top tens	Poles
0	0	0
- Statistics up to date as of February 28, 2025.

Connor Okrzesik (born October 24, 2001) is an American professional stock car racing driver who has competed in the ARCA Menards Series and the ARCA Menards Series East.

Okrzesik has also competed in series such as the ASA STARS National Tour, the ASA CRA Super Series, the ASA Southern Super Series, and the CARS Super Late Model Tour.

== Motorsports results ==
=== ARCA Menards Series ===
(key) (Bold – Pole position awarded by qualifying time. Italics – Pole position earned by points standings or practice time. * – Most laps led.)

ARCA Menards Series results
Year	Team	No.	Make	1	2	3	4	5	6	7	8	9	10	11	12	13	14	15	16	17	18	19	20	AMSC	Pts	Ref
2019	Connor Okrzesik Racing	14	Chevy	DAY	FIF; 7	SLM	TAL	NSH; 10	TOL	CLT	POC	MCH	MAD	GTW	CHI	ELK	IOW	POC	ISF	DSF	SLM	IRP	KAN	46th	375	

==== ARCA Menards Series East ====
ARCA Menards Series East results
Year	Team	No.	Make	1	2	3	4	5	6	AMSEC	Pts	Ref
2020	Connor Okrzesik Racing	14	Chevy	NSM	TOL	DOV	TOL	BRI	FIF; 17	24th	67	

=== CARS Super Late Model Tour ===
(key)

CARS Super Late Model Tour results
Year	Team	No.	Make	1	2	3	4	5	6	7	8	9	10	11	12	13	CSLMTC	Pts	Ref
2017	Connor Okrzesik Racing	14O	Toyota	CON	DOM	DOM	HCY	HCY	BRI; 13								N/A	0	
2017	Connor Okrzesik Racing	14	Toyota							AND; 8	ROU	TCM	ROU	HCY	CON	SBO	N/A	0	
2018	Connor Okrzesik Racing	14X	Chevy	MYB	NSH; 15	ROU	HCY										N/A	0	
2018	Connor Okrzesik Racing	14	Chevy					BRI; 6									N/A	0	
2018	Connor Okrzesik Racing	14C	Chevy						AND; 21	]HCY	ROU	SBO					N/A	0	
2019	Connor Okrzesik Racing	14	Toyota	SNM	HCY	NSH; 24	MMS										N/A	0	
2019	Connor Okrzesik Racing	14O	Toyota					BRI; 30	HCY	ROU	SBO						N/A	0	
2020	Connor Okrzesik Racing	14O	Chevy	SNM	HCY	JEN	HCY	FCS	BRI; 11	FLC	NSH; 9						N/A	0	
2021	Connor Okrzesik Racing	14	Chevy	HCY	GPS; 21	NSH	JEN	HCY	MMS	TCM	SBO						N/A	0	

=== ASA STARS National Tour ===
(key) (Bold – Pole position awarded by qualifying time. Italics – Pole position earned by points standings or practice time. * – Most laps led. ** – All laps led.)

ASA STARS National Tour results
Year	Team	No.	Make	1	2	3	4	5	6	7	8	9	10	11	12	ASNTC	Pts	Ref
2023	George E. Bragg	22C	Toyota	FIF; 30	MAD	NWS	HCY	MLW	AND	WIR	TOL	WIN	NSV			101st	22	
2024	Connor Okrzesik Racing	14C	Toyota	NSM	FIF; 20	HCY; 9	MAD	MLW	AND	OWO	TOL	WIN	NSV; 20			25th	128	
2025	Connor Okrzesik Racing	14O	Toyota	NSM	FIF; 14	DOM	HCY	NPS	MAD	SLG	AND	OWO	TOL	WIN	NSV	56th	38	
