= 2020 Speediatrics 150 =

2020 Speediatrics 150 presented by The NASCAR Foundation
Race details
- Race 20 of 20 of the 2020 ARCA Menards Series
- Date: October 16, 2020
- Official name: 20th Annual Speediatrics 150 presented by The NASCAR Foundation
- Location: Kansas City, Kansas, Kansas Speedway
- Course: Permanent racing facility
- Course length: 1.5 miles (2.41 km)
- Distance: 100 laps, 150 mi (241.402 km)
- Scheduled distance: 100 laps, 150 mi (241.402 km)
- Average speed: 125.611 miles per hour (202.151 km/h)

Pole position
Driver	Ty Gibbs	Joe Gibbs Racing
- Time: Set by 2020 owner's points

Most laps led
Driver	Corey Heim	Venturini Motorsports
- Laps: 82

Winner
No. 12	Corey Heim	Venturini Motorsports

Television in the United States
- Network: Fox Sports 1
- Announcers: David Rieff, Phil Parsons

Radio in the United States
- Radio: Motor Racing Network

The 2020 Speediatrics 150 presented by The NASCAR Foundation was the 20th and final stock car race of the 2020 ARCA Menards Series and the 20th iteration of the event. The race was held on Friday, October 16, 2020, in Kansas City, Kansas at Kansas Speedway, a 1.500 miles (2.414 km) permanent paved oval-shaped racetrack. The race took the scheduled 100 laps to complete. At race's end, Corey Heim of Venturini Motorsports would dominate to win first career ARCA Menards Series win and his first and only win of the season. Meanwhile, second-place finisher Bret Holmes, driving for his own team, Bret Holmes Racing, would lock up and win the 2020 ARCA Menards Series championship, winning by 12 points. To fill out the podium, Derek Griffith of Chad Bryant Racing would finish third.

== Background ==
Kansas Speedway is a 1.5-mile (2.4 km) tri-oval race track in Kansas City, Kansas. It was built in 2001 and hosts two annual NASCAR race weekends. The NTT IndyCar Series also raced there until 2011. The speedway is owned and operated by the International Speedway Corporation.

=== Entry list ===
#	Driver	Team	Make	Sponsor
0	Wayne Peterson	Wayne Peterson Racing	Chevrolet	Great Railing
01	Alex Clubb	Fast Track Racing	Ford	Fast Track Racing
4	Hailie Deegan	DGR-Crosley	Ford	Toter "Built For Extremes"
06	Tim Richmond	Wayne Peterson Racing	Toyota	Immigration Legal Center, Great Railing
7	Eric Caudell	CCM Racing	Toyota	ETRM Software Counseling, Caudell Counseling & Marketing
10	Corey Heim	Venturini Motorsports	Toyota	Craftsman
11	Owen Smith	Fast Track Racing	Chevrolet	Fast Track Racing
12	Kris Wright	Chad Bryant Racing	Chevrolet	Mastertech, FNB Corporation
15	Drew Dollar	Venturini Motorsports	Toyota	Sunbelt Rentals
17	Dylan Lupton	DGR-Crosley	Ford	DGR-Crosley
18	Ty Gibbs	Joe Gibbs Racing	Toyota	Monster Energy
20	Chandler Smith	Venturini Motorsports	Toyota	JBL
22	Derek Griffith	Chad Bryant Racing	Ford	Original Gourmet Lollipops
23	Bret Holmes	Bret Holmes Racing	Chevrolet	Golden Eagle Syrup
25	Michael Self	Venturini Motorsports	Toyota	Sinclair
48	Brad Smith	Brad Smith Motorsports	Chevrolet	Henshaw Automation
69	Scott Melton	Kimmel Racing	Chevrolet	Melton-McFadden Insurance Agency
77	Mike Basham	Fast Track Racing	Ford	Fast Track Racing
Official entry list

== Practice ==
The only 30-minute practice session was held on Friday, October 16. Bret Holmes of Bret Holmes Racing would set the fastest time in the session, with a lap of 30.753 and an average speed of 175.593 miles per hour (282.590 km/h).

Pos.	#	Driver	Team	Make	Time	Speed
1	23	Bret Holmes	Bret Holmes Racing	Chevrolet	30.753	175.593
2	18	Ty Gibbs	Joe Gibbs Racing	Toyota	30.896	174.780
3	22	Derek Griffith	Chad Bryant Racing	Ford	30.919	174.650
Full practice results

== Starting lineup ==
The starting lineup was determined by the current 2020 owner's points. As a result, Ty Gibbs of Joe Gibbs Racing would win the pole.

Pos.	#	Driver	Team	Make
1	18	Ty Gibbs	Joe Gibbs Racing	Toyota
2	23	Bret Holmes	Bret Holmes Racing	Chevrolet
3	25	Michael Self	Venturini Motorsports	Toyota
4	20	Chandler Smith	Venturini Motorsports	Toyota
5	17	Dylan Lupton	DGR-Crosley	Ford
6	4	Hailie Deegan	DGR-Crosley	Ford
7	15	Drew Dollar	Venturini Motorsports	Toyota
8	12	Kris Wright	Chad Bryant Racing	Chevrolet
9	10	Corey Heim	Venturini Motorsports	Toyota
10	06	Tim Richmond	Wayne Peterson Racing	Toyota
11	11	Owen Smith	Fast Track Racing	Chevrolet
12	48	Brad Smith	Brad Smith Motorsports	Chevrolet
13	22	Derek Griffith	Chad Bryant Racing	Ford
14	69	Scott Melton	Kimmel Racing	Chevrolet
15	0	Wayne Peterson	Wayne Peterson Racing	Chevrolet
16	7	Eric Caudell	CCM Racing	Toyota
17	01	Alex Clubb	Fast Track Racing	Ford
18	77	Mike Basham	Fast Track Racing	Ford

== Race results ==
Fin	St	#	Driver	Team	Make	Laps	Led	Status	Pts
1	9	10	Corey Heim	Venturini Motorsports	Toyota	100	82	running	47
2	2	23	Bret Holmes	Bret Holmes Racing	Chevrolet	100	18	running	43
3	13	22	Derek Griffith	Chad Bryant Racing	Ford	100	0	running	41
4	5	17	Dylan Lupton	DGR-Crosley	Ford	100	0	running	40
5	3	25	Michael Self	Venturini Motorsports	Toyota	100	0	running	39
6	6	4	Hailie Deegan	DGR-Crosley	Ford	100	0	running	38
7	8	12	Kris Wright	Chad Bryant Racing	Chevrolet	100	0	running	37
8	7	15	Drew Dollar	Venturini Motorsports	Toyota	99	0	running	36
9	14	69	Scott Melton	Kimmel Racing	Chevrolet	97	0	running	35
10	16	7	Eric Caudell	CCM Racing	Toyota	96	0	running	34
11	10	06	Tim Richmond	Wayne Peterson Racing	Toyota	94	0	running	33
12	18	77	Mike Basham	Fast Track Racing	Ford	91	0	running	32
13	4	20	Chandler Smith	Venturini Motorsports	Toyota	81	0	running	31
14	1	18	Ty Gibbs	Joe Gibbs Racing	Toyota	60	0	running	30
15	12	48	Brad Smith	Brad Smith Motorsports	Chevrolet	36	0	engine	29
16	11	11	Owen Smith	Fast Track Racing	Chevrolet	30	0	clutch	28
17	15	0	Wayne Peterson	Wayne Peterson Racing	Chevrolet	2	0	brakes	27
18	17	01	Alex Clubb	Fast Track Racing	Ford	1	0	vibration	26
Official race results

Previous race: 2020 Illinois Truck & Equipment Allen Crowe 100	ARCA Menards Series; 2020 season	Next race: 2021 Lucas Oil 200
