= Eric Caudell =

American racing driver

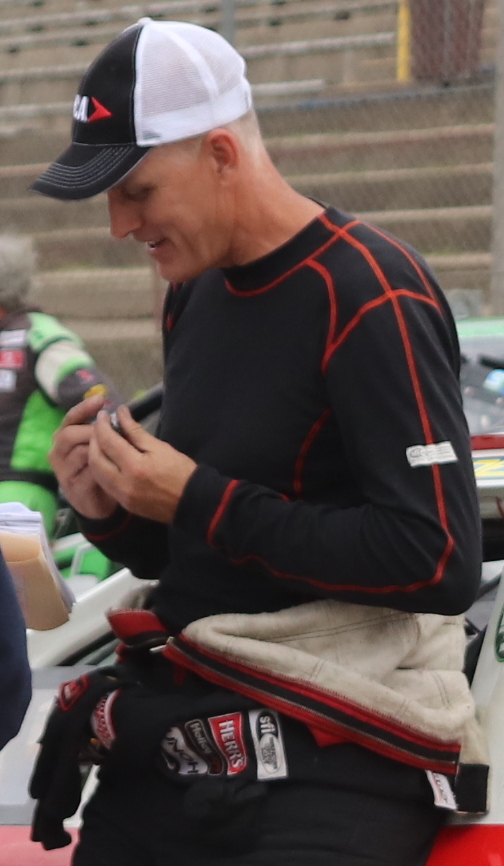
- Caudell in 2019
- Born: January 2, 1967 (age 59); Piedmont, Oklahoma, U.S.

NASCAR FedEx Freight Truck Series career
- 1 race run over 1 year
- Best finish: 79th (2014)
- First race: 2014 American Ethanol 200 (Iowa)
Wins	Top tens	Poles
0	0	0

ARCA Menards Series career
- 71 races run over 12 years
- Best finish: 10th (2017)
- First race: 2015 International Motorsports Hall of Fame 200 (Talladega)
- Last race: 2026 Alabama Manufactured Housing 200 (Talladega)
Wins	Top tens	Poles
0	3	0

ARCA Menards Series East career
- 4 races run over 3 years
- Best finish: 30th (2021)
- First race: 2021 Shore Lunch 150 (Iowa)
- Last race: 2024 Bush's Beans 200 (Bristol)
Wins	Top tens	Poles
0	0	0
- Statistics up to date as of April 25, 2026.

Eric Caudell (born January 2, 1967) is an American professional stock car racing driver. He last competed part-time in the ARCA Menards Series, driving the No. 7 Toyota for his team, CCM Racing. He has competed in ARCA since 2015, including running full-time for one season in 2017, where he finished tenth in points. He also made one Truck Series start in 2014 at Iowa.

== Racing career ==
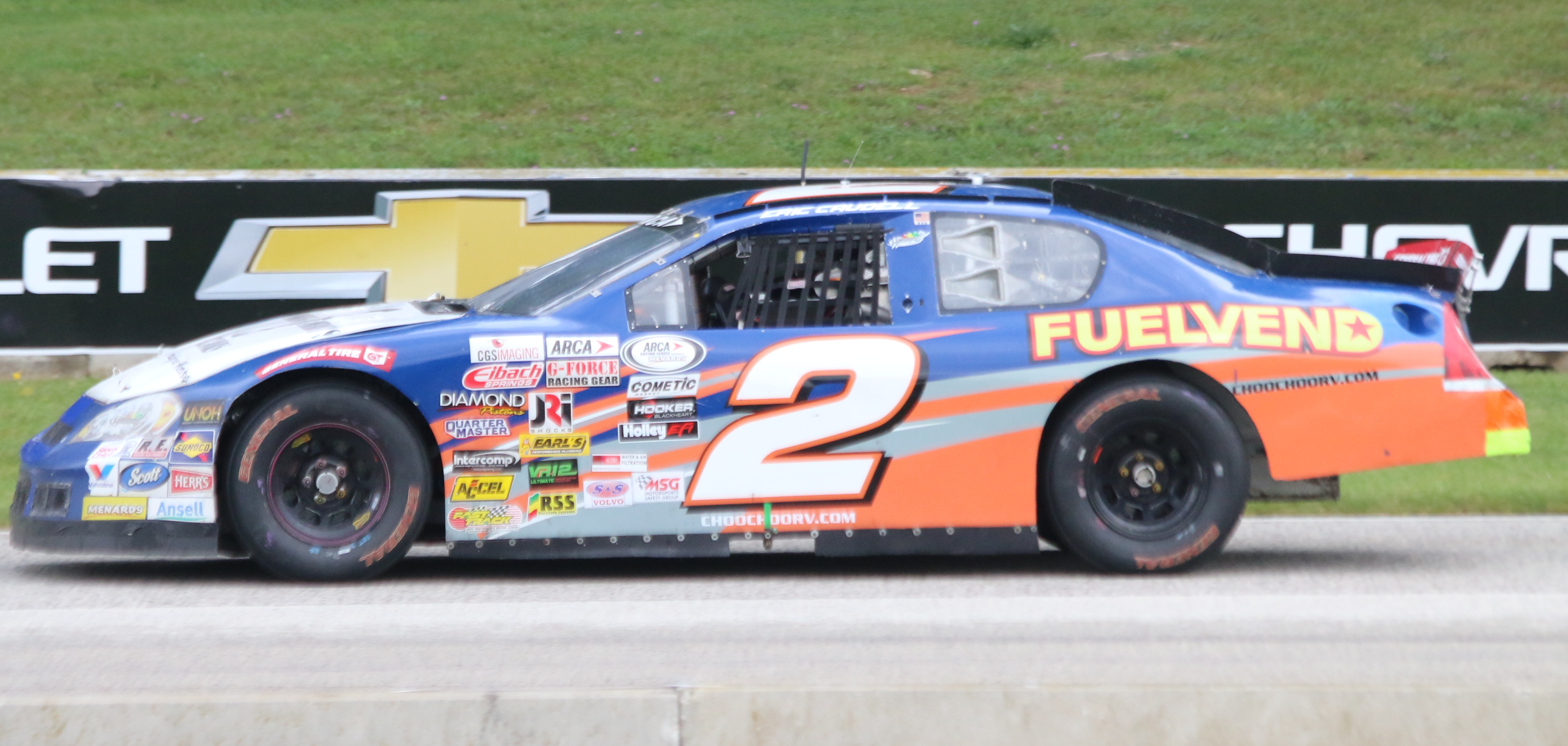
Caudell's No. 2 car in 2017 for Hixson Motorsports at Road America.

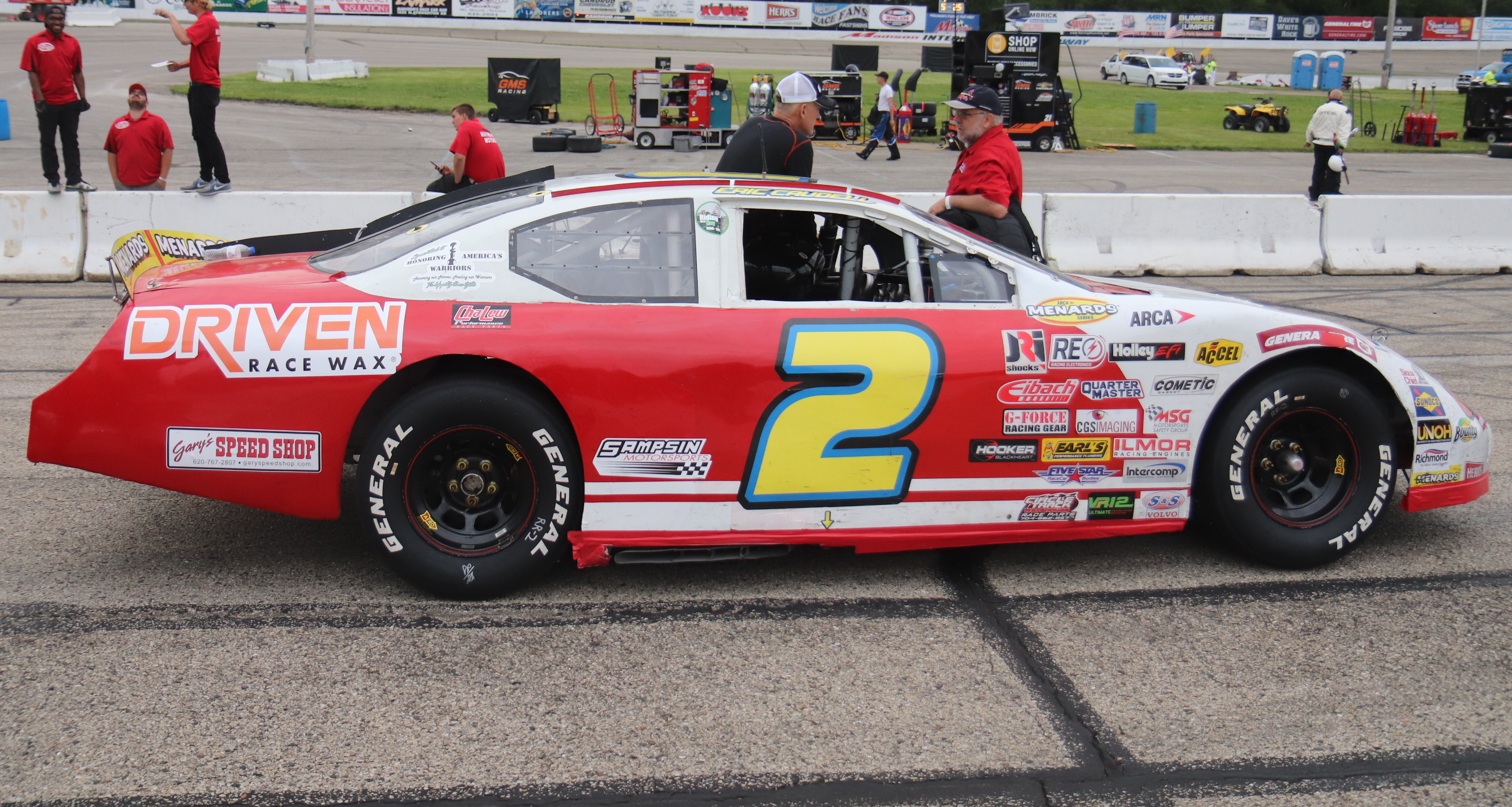
Caudell's No. 2 car in 2019 for CCM Racing at Madison.

Caudell had raced for many years in the United States Super Truck Series until the series shut down.

Caudell made his Truck Series debut in 2014, driving the No. 12 for Cefalia Motorsports. He finished 28th.

In 2017, Caudell competed in a full season in the ARCA Racing Series in the No. 2 for Hixson Motorsports, a team he previously drove part-time for in the series in 2016. Also, his crew chief that year was Crystal Bates, one of the few female crew chiefs in stock car racing. He ended up finishing tenth in points.

For 2020, it was announced that Caudell and his No. 7 team would be returning to ARCA in ten races: Daytona, Talladega, Chicagoland, Lucas Oil, Elko, Iowa, Springfield, DuQuoin, Bristol, Memphis, and Kansas. In addition, Caudell and his team participated in ARCA's Daytona testing in January 2020 leading up to the race there the following month. Caudell and his former Hixson Motorsports teammate Rick Tackman shared his No. 7 car during the test session.

In 2021, Caudell returned for another part-time schedule in his No. 7 car. He also made his debut in the ARCA Menards Series East (formerly the NASCAR K&N Pro Series East) that year as his schedule included the three combination races (Iowa, Milwaukee, and Bristol) that the main ARCA Series had with the East Series.

== Personal life ==
Caudell graduated from the University of Oklahoma, earning a degree in Management Information Systems.

Caudell lives in Piedmont, Oklahoma and in addition to racing and has worked as an energy trading software consultant for Murphy USA for over twenty years.

Outside of racing, Caudell serves as a marketing consultant in the oil industry by trade.

== Motorsports career results ==
=== NASCAR ===
(key) (Bold – Pole position awarded by qualifying time. Italics – Pole position earned by points standings or practice time. * – Most laps led.)

==== Camping World Truck Series ====
NASCAR Camping World Truck Series results
Year	Team	No.	Make	1	2	3	4	5	6	7	8	9	10	11	12	13	14	15	16	17	18	19	20	21	22	NCWTC	Pts	Ref
2014	Cefalia Motorsports	12	Chevy	DAY	MAR	KAN	CLT	DOV	TEX	GTW	KEN	IOW; 28	ELD	POC	MCH	BRI	MSP	CHI	NHA	LVS	TAL	MAR	TEX	PHO	HOM	79th	16	

=== ARCA Menards Series ===
(key) (Bold – Pole position awarded by qualifying time. Italics – Pole position earned by points standings or practice time. * – Most laps led.)

ARCA Menards Series results
Year	Team	No.	Make	1	2	3	4	5	6	7	8	9	10	11	12	13	14	15	16	17	18	19	20	AMSC	Pts	Ref
2015	Carter 2 Motorsports	40	Dodge	DAY	MOB	NSH	SLM	TAL; 33	TOL	NJE	POC; 27	MCH	CHI								SLM; 25			47th	490	
2015	Carter 2 Motorsports	97	Dodge											WIN; 18	IOW	IRP	POC	BLN	ISF	DSF				47th	490	
2015	Carter 2 Motorsports	40	Ford																			KEN; 29	KAN	47th	490	
2016	Hamilton-Hughes Racing	64	Chevy	DAY; DNQ																				38th	700	
2016	Hamilton-Hughes Racing	64	Dodge		NSH; 26	SLM	TAL	TOL	NJE	POC	MCH	MAD												38th	700	
2016	Hixson Motorsports	2	Chevy										WIN; 16	IOW	IRP	POC	BLN; 20						KAN; 19	38th	700	
2016	Hixson Motorsports	11	Chevy															ISF; 14	DSF	SLM	CHI	KEN		38th	700	
2017	Hixson Motorsports	2	Chevy	DAY; 36	NSH; 22	SLM; 20	TAL; 35	TOL; 27									ISF; 26	ROA; 28	DSF; 17	SLM; 20				10th	3220	
2017	Hixson Motorsports	2	Ford						ELK; 18	POC; 26	MCH; 18	MAD; 18	IOW; 19	IRP; 28	POC; 30	WIN; 21					CHI; 20	KEN; 24	KAN; 23	10th	3220	
2018	Hixson Motorsports	2	Dodge	DAY	NSH; 20	SLM	TAL	TOL	CLT	POC	MCH	MAD	GTW; 18	CHI; 21	IOW	ELK	POC	ISF	BLN	DSF	SLM; 23	IRP	KAN; 11	27th	710	
2019	CCM Racing	2	Ford	DAY; 33	FIF	SLM	TAL																	18th	1450	
2019	CCM Racing	2	Dodge					NSH; 14	TOL	CLT	POC	MCH	MAD; 13											18th	1450	
2019	CCM Racing	7	Toyota											GTW; 12	CHI; 14		IOW; 13	POC				IRP; 20	KAN; 18	18th	1450	
2019	CCM Racing	7	Dodge													ELK; 13			ISF; 20	DSF	SLM			18th	1450	
2020	CCM Racing	7	Ford	DAY; 17	PHO	TAL; 14	POC	IRP	KEN	IOW											MEM; 14			18th	217	
2020	Kimmel Racing	69	Toyota								KAN; 12	TOL	TOL	MCH	DAY	GTW	L44	TOL	BRI					18th	217	
2020	CCM Racing	7	Toyota																	WIN; 8			KAN; 10	18th	217	
2020	CCM Racing	7	Chevy																			ISF; 16		18th	217	
2021	CCM Racing	7	Ford	DAY; 16	PHO	TAL; 9													MLW; 21	DSF	BRI	SLM		25th	171	
2021	CCM Racing	7	Toyota				KAN; 14	TOL	CLT	MOH	POC	ELK	BLN	IOW; 14	WIN	GLN	MCH	ISF					KAN; 19	25th	171	
2022	CCM Racing	7	Ford	DAY; 36	PHO	TAL; 27	KAN	CLT	IOW	BLN	ELK	MOH	POC	IRP	MCH	GLN	ISF							69th	47	
2022	CCM Racing	7	Chevy															MLW; 22	DSF	KAN	BRI	SLM	TOL	69th	47	
2023	CCM Racing	7	Toyota	DAY; 34	PHO	TAL; 23	KAN	CLT	BLN	ELK	MOH	IOW	POC	MCH	IRP	GLN	ISF	MLW	DSF	KAN	BRI	SLM	TOL	90th	32	
2024	CCM Racing	7	Toyota	DAY; Wth	PHO	TAL; 15	DOV	KAN	CLT	IOW	MOH	BLN	IRP	SLM	ELK	MCH	ISF	MLW						46th	89	
2024	CCM Racing	7	Ford																DSF; Wth	GLN				46th	89	
2024	Fast Track Racing	12	Chevy																		BRI; 14			46th	89	
2024	CCM Racing	7	Chevy																			KAN; 14	TOL	46th	89	
2025	CCM Racing	7	Toyota	DAY; 40	PHO	TAL; 19	KAN	CLT	MCH	BLN	ELK	LRP	DOV	IRP	IOW	GLN	ISF	MAD	DSF	BRI	SLM	KAN; 17	TOL	75th	56	
2026	CCM Racing	7	Toyota	DAY; 22	PHO	KAN	TAL; 36	GLN	TOL	MCH	POC	BER	ELK	CHI	LRP	IRP	IOW	ISF	MAD	DSF	SLM	BRI	KAN	105th	30	

==== ARCA Menards Series East ====
ARCA Menards Series East results
Year	Team	No.	Make	1	2	3	4	5	6	7	8	AMSEC	Pts	Ref
2021	CCM Racing	7	Toyota	NSM	FIF	NSV	DOV	SNM	IOW; 14			30th	53	
2021	CCM Racing	7	Ford							MLW; 21	BRI	30th	53	
2022	CCM Racing	22	Chevy	NSM	FIF	DOV; Wth	NSV	IOW				53rd	22	
2022	CCM Racing	7	Chevy						MLW; 22	BRI		53rd	22	
2024	Fast Track Racing	12	Chevy	FIF	DOV	NSV	FRS	IOW	IRP	MLW	BRI; 14	51st	30	

^{*} Season still in progress
