= 2019 ARCA Menards Series =

67th season of the ARCA Menards Series

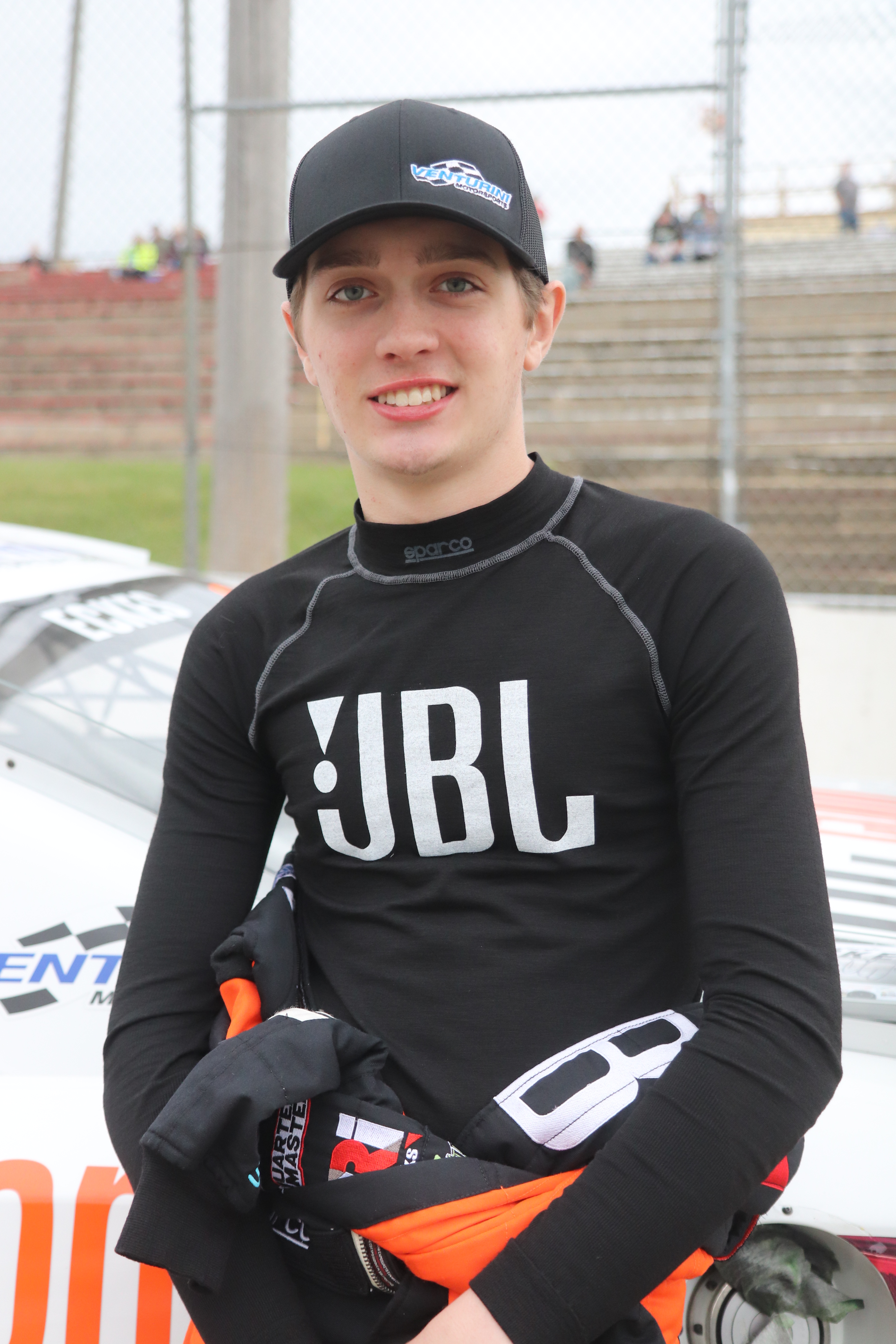
Christian Eckes, the 2019 ARCA Menards Series champion.

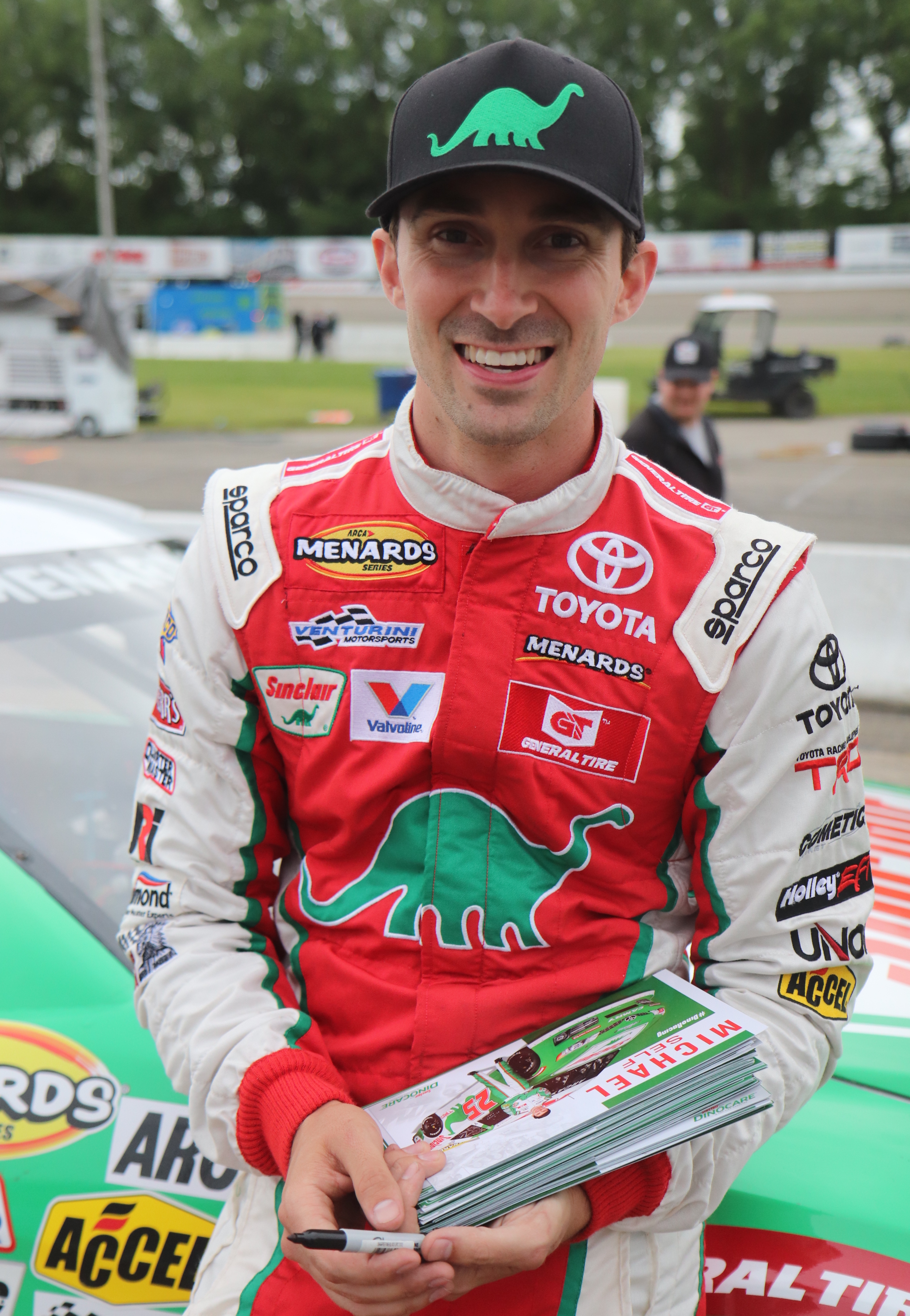
Michael Self finished second behind Eckes in the championship by just 25 points.

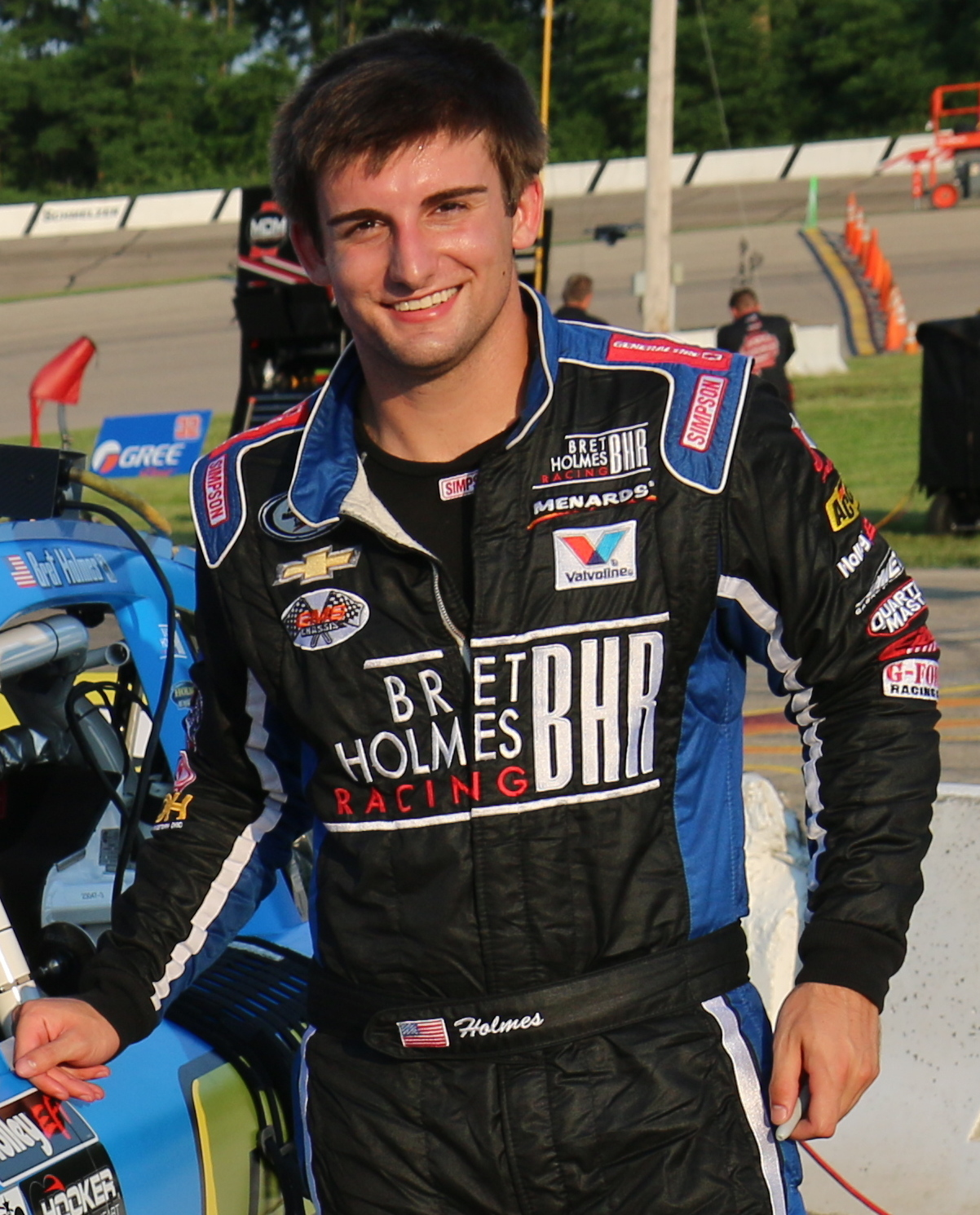
Bret Holmes finished third in the championship.

The 2019 ARCA Menards Series was the 67th season of the ARCA Menards Series. Christian Eckes of Venturini Motorsports won the championship over teammate Michael Self. Eckes became the first champion since Tim Steele in 1997 to win the title after missing a race during the season.

On February 9, 2019, hours before the season-opening Lucas Oil 200, ARCA announced that the series would be renamed to the ARCA Menards Series for at least 2019 and 2020. Menards had previously been a presenting sponsor for ARCA.

== Teams and drivers ==
=== Complete schedule ===
| Manufacturer | Team | No. | Driver |
|---|---|---|---|
| Ford | Chad Bryant Racing | 22 | Connor Hall 1 |
| Ford | Chad Bryant Racing | 22 | Corey Heim (R) 13 |
| Ford | Chad Bryant Racing | 22 | Ty Majeski 6 |
| Ford | RFMS Racing | 27 | Travis Braden |
| Toyota | Joe Gibbs Racing | 18 | Riley Herbst 8 |
| Toyota | Joe Gibbs Racing | 18 | Ty Gibbs 11 |
| Toyota | Joe Gibbs Racing | 18 | Todd Gilliland 1 |
| Toyota | Venturini Motorsports | 15 | Christian Eckes (R) 19 |
| Toyota | Venturini Motorsports | 15 | Harrison Burton 1 |
| Toyota | Venturini Motorsports | 20 | Harrison Burton 5 |
| Toyota | Venturini Motorsports | 20 | Chandler Smith 11 |
| Toyota | Venturini Motorsports | 20 | Brandon Lynn 1 |
| Toyota | Venturini Motorsports | 20 | Myatt Snider 1 |
| Toyota | Venturini Motorsports | 20 | Logan Seavey 2 |
| Toyota | Venturini Motorsports | 25 | Michael Self |
| Chevrolet 17 Toyota 3 | Bret Holmes Racing | 23 | Bret Holmes |
| Ford 17 Chevrolet 3 | Chad Bryant Racing | 77 | Joe Graf Jr. |
| Toyota 3 Chevrolet 12 Ford 5 | Fast Track Racing | 1 | Chuck Hiers 1 |
| Toyota 3 Chevrolet 12 Ford 5 | Fast Track Racing | 1 | Dick Doheny 13 |
| Toyota 3 Chevrolet 12 Ford 5 | Fast Track Racing | 1 | Ed Pompa 3 |
| Toyota 3 Chevrolet 12 Ford 5 | Fast Track Racing | 1 | Jason Miles 2 |
| Toyota 3 Chevrolet 12 Ford 5 | Fast Track Racing | 1 | Darrell Basham 1 |
| Ford 19 Toyota 1 | Fast Track Racing | 10 | Tommy Vigh Jr. (R) |
| Chevrolet 2 Ford 7 Toyota 11 | Fast Track Racing | 11 | Jason White 1 |
| Chevrolet 2 Ford 7 Toyota 11 | Fast Track Racing | 11 | Matt Dooley 1 |
| Chevrolet 2 Ford 7 Toyota 11 | Fast Track Racing | 11 | Morgen Baird 3 |
| Chevrolet 2 Ford 7 Toyota 11 | Fast Track Racing | 11 | D. L. Wilson 1 |
| Chevrolet 2 Ford 7 Toyota 11 | Fast Track Racing | 11 | Mike Basham 3 |
| Chevrolet 2 Ford 7 Toyota 11 | Fast Track Racing | 11 | Rick Clifton 3 |
| Chevrolet 2 Ford 7 Toyota 11 | Fast Track Racing | 11 | Jason Miles 1 |
| Chevrolet 2 Ford 7 Toyota 11 | Fast Track Racing | 11 | Dick Doheny 3 |
| Chevrolet 2 Ford 7 Toyota 11 | Fast Track Racing | 11 | Dick Karth 1 |
| Chevrolet 2 Ford 7 Toyota 11 | Fast Track Racing | 11 | Tyler Speer 1 |
| Chevrolet 2 Ford 7 Toyota 11 | Fast Track Racing | 11 | Ed Pompa 2 |
| Toyota 1 Chevrolet 19 | KBR Development | 28 | Brandon McReynolds 4 |
| Toyota 1 Chevrolet 19 | KBR Development | 28 | Carson Hocevar (R) 12 |
| Toyota 1 Chevrolet 19 | KBR Development | 28 | Raphaël Lessard 2 |
| Toyota 1 Chevrolet 19 | KBR Development | 28 | Stefan Parsons 1 |
| Toyota 1 Chevrolet 19 | KBR Development | 28 | Sheldon Creed 1 |
| Ford 14 Toyota 6 | Kimmel Racing | 69 | Scott Melton (R) 10 |
| Ford 14 Toyota 6 | Kimmel Racing | 69 | Mike Basham 5 |
| Ford 14 Toyota 6 | Kimmel Racing | 69 | Barry Layne 1 |
| Ford 14 Toyota 6 | Kimmel Racing | 69 | Dale Shearer 2 |
| Ford 14 Toyota 6 | Kimmel Racing | 69 | Will Kimmel 2 |
| Chevrolet 4 Dodge 8 Toyota 7 Ford 1 | Wayne Peterson Racing | 06 | Con Nicolopoulos 3 |
| Chevrolet 4 Dodge 8 Toyota 7 Ford 1 | Wayne Peterson Racing | 06 | Tim Richmond (R) 17 |

=== Limited schedule ===
| Manufacturer | Team | No. | Driver | Rounds |
|---|---|---|---|---|
| Chevrolet | Allgaier Motorsports | 16 | Kelly Kovski | 2 |
| Chevrolet | Bobby Gerhart Racing | 5 | Bobby Gerhart | 7 |
| Chevrolet | Brother-In-Law Racing | 57 | Bryan Dauzat | 2 |
| Chevrolet | Connor Okrzesik Racing | 14 | Connor Okrzesik | 2 |
| Chevrolet | CR7 Motorsports | 7 | Codie Rohrbaugh | 2 |
| Chevrolet | Darrell Basham Racing | 34 | Darrell Basham | 1 |
| Chevrolet | Darrell Basham Racing | 34 | Mike Basham | 2 |
| Chevrolet | Empire Racing | 43 | Sean Corr | 2 |
| Chevrolet | Finney Racing Enterprises | 80 | Brian Finney | 1 |
| Chevrolet | GMS Racing | 21 | Sam Mayer | 7 |
| Chevrolet | GMS Racing | 21 | Sheldon Creed | 1 |
| Chevrolet | KBR Development | 19 | Raphaël Lessard | 1 |
| Chevrolet | Max Force Racing | 9 | Thomas Praytor | 1 |
| Chevrolet | Spraker Racing Enterprises | 63 | Dave Mader III | 1 |
| Chevrolet | Win-Tron Racing | 32 | Gus Dean | 4 |
| Chevrolet | Win-Tron Racing | 32 | Cole Glasson | 1 |
| Chevrolet | Win-Tron Racing | 32 | Austin Wayne Self | 2 |
| Chevrolet | Win-Tron Racing | 32 | Howie DiSavino III | 2 |
| Chevrolet | Win-Tron Racing | 32 | Colby Howard | 2 |
| Ford | Chad Bryant Racing | 7 | Connor Hall | 1 |
| Ford | Clubb Racing | 03 | Alex Clubb | 2 |
| Ford | Dale Shearer Racing (Note: It was a Dale Shearer Racing entry using Kimmel Racing's owner points.) | 68 | Dale Shearer | 1 |
| Ford | Kaden Honeycutt Racing | 38 | Kaden Honeycutt | 3 |
| Ford | Mullins Racing | 3 | Willie Mullins | 3 |
| Ford | Rette Jones Racing | 30 | Grant Quinlan | 2 |
| Toyota | DGR-Crosley | 4 | Todd Gilliland | 2 |
| Toyota | DGR-Crosley | 4 | Drew Dollar | 2 |
| Toyota | DGR-Crosley | 54 | Natalie Decker | 2 |
| Toyota | DGR-Crosley | 54 | Tanner Gray | 8 |
| Toyota | Hendren Motorsports | 24 | Ryan Unzicker | 2 |
| Toyota | J. J. Pack Racing | 61 | J. J. Pack | 1 |
| Toyota | On Point Motorsports | 29 | Derrick Lancaster | 1 |
| Toyota | Rick Ware Racing | 51 | Carson Ware | 1 |
| Toyota | Venturini Motorsports | 55 | Leilani Munter | 1 |
| Toyota | Venturini Motorsports | 55 | Hailie Deegan | 6 |
| Toyota | Venturini Motorsports | 55 | Gavin Harlien | 3 |
| Toyota | Vizion Motorsports | 35 | Brenden Queen (R) | 1 |
| Toyota | Vizion Motorsports | 35 | Devin Dodson | 1 |
| Toyota | Vizion Motorsports | 36 | Paul Williamson | 1 |
| Chevrolet 10 Ford 9 | Brad Smith Motorsports | 48 | Brad Smith | 19 |
| Ford 1 Dodge 2 | CCM Racing | 2 | Eric Caudell | 3 |
| Toyota 5 Dodge 2 | CCM Racing | 7 | Eric Caudell | 7 |
| Chevrolet 1 Ford 1 | Empire Racing | 44 | John Ferrier | 1 |
| Chevrolet 1 Ford 1 | Empire Racing | 44 | Lexi Gay | 1 |
| Chevrolet 5 Ford 2 | Empire Racing | 46 | Thad Moffitt | 7 |
| Ford 1 Toyota 1 | Ken Schrader Racing | 52 | Tyler Dippel | 1 |
| Ford 1 Toyota 1 | Ken Schrader Racing | 52 | Ken Schrader | 1 |
| Chevrolet 2 Ford 1 | Our Motorsports | 02 | Andy Seuss | 3 |
| Chevrolet 3 Ford 1 | Our Motorsports | 09 | C. J. McLaughlin | 4 |
| Toyota 1 Chevrolet 3 Dodge 1 Ford 4 | Wayne Peterson Racing | 0 | Wayne Peterson | 4 |
| Toyota 1 Chevrolet 3 Dodge 1 Ford 4 | Wayne Peterson Racing | 0 | Con Nicolopoulos | 1 |
| Toyota 1 Chevrolet 3 Dodge 1 Ford 4 | Wayne Peterson Racing | 0 | Alex Clubb | 1 |
| Toyota 1 Chevrolet 3 Dodge 1 Ford 4 | Wayne Peterson Racing | 0 | Don Thompson | 1 |
| Toyota 1 Chevrolet 3 Dodge 1 Ford 4 | Wayne Peterson Racing | 0 | Benjamin Peterson | 2 |

== Changes ==
=== Teams ===
- On Point Motorsports has announced plans to enter the series part-time in 2019.
- GMS Racing announced a re-entry into ARCA for 2019 with Sam Mayer as driver.
- KBR Development announced a full schedule for 2019 with technical support from GMS, up from a three-race venture in 2018 with a renumbered 28 car. To help the effort, KBR purchased some assets of MDM Motorsports.

=== Drivers ===
- On October 24, 2018, it was announced that Christian Eckes will run full-time for Venturini Motorsports in 2019. Eckes had run part-time with VMS in 2016, 2017 and 2018.
- On October 26, 2018, Corey Heim announced a schedule of thirteen events for the 2019 season in the No. 22 for Chad Bryant Racing.
- On November 2, 2018, it was announced that Chandler Smith would return to Venturini Motorsports for the 2019 season for 11 races. Smith will run mostly short track events due to age restrictions.
- On November 24, 2018, it was announced that Carson Hocevar and KBR Development will run the Sioux Chief Short Track Challenge in 2019.
- On November 30, 2018, it was announced that Natalie Decker will run a partial schedule with DGR-Crosley in 2019. She ran full-time for Venturini Motorsports in 2018.
- On December 6, 2018, Sam Mayer and GMS Racing announced a seven-race partnership.
- On January 10, 2019, it was announced that Harrison Burton will drive the Venturini Motorsports No. 20 Toyota for five races in 2019. Burton drove for MDM Motorsports in 2018.
- On January 11, 2019, Michael Self announced a full-season schedule with Venturini Motorsports in the organization's No. 25 entry. Self ran half the 2018 schedule with Venturini.
- Connor Okrzesik announced that he will make his ARCA debut in the race at Five Flags Speedway on March 9.
- On March 1, 2019, it was announced that Hailie Deegan signed a six-race deal to drive for Venturini Motorsports in the 2019 season.
- On March 22, 2019, Chad Bryant Racing announced that Ty Majeski would be in their No. 22 car for 5 races. Majeski ran a part-time season with Roush-Fenway Racing in the NASCAR Xfinity Series in 2018. Majeski would later add Talladega to his schedule.
- On March 26, 2019, Venturini Motorsports and Gavin Harlien confirmed a 3 race deal in the No. 55 entry.
- In April 2019, it was revealed that Tommy Vigh Jr. would run the full season with Fast Track Racing in the No. 10 car and run for Rookie of the Year after running a partial schedule with the team in 2018.

=== Crew chiefs ===
- On December 6, 2018, Joe Gibbs Racing announced that Mark McFarland had been hired as the crew chief of their ARCA team.
- On January 15, 2019, it was confirmed that former Monster Energy NASCAR Cup Series crew chief Frank Kerr had signed with DGR-Crosley to become the crew chief for Natalie Decker in 2019.
- Matt Weber and Todd Myers both joined Chad Bryant Racing for 2019.
- On January 15, 2019, it was announced that Tony Furr, who served as crew chief of the StarCom Racing No. 00 team in the 2018 Monster Energy NASCAR Cup Series, moved to Mullins Racing in the same capacity.

== Schedule ==
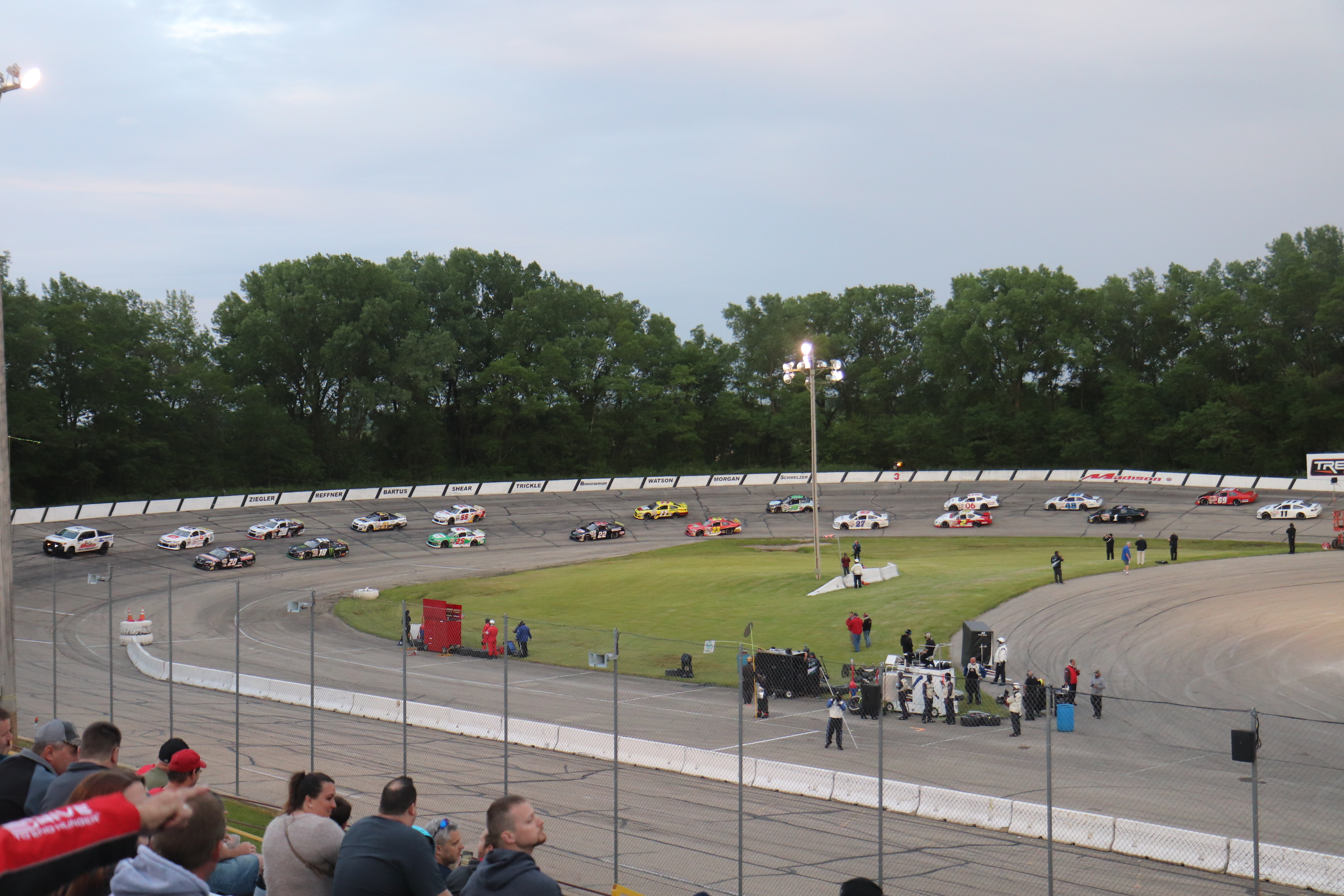
Field at Madison

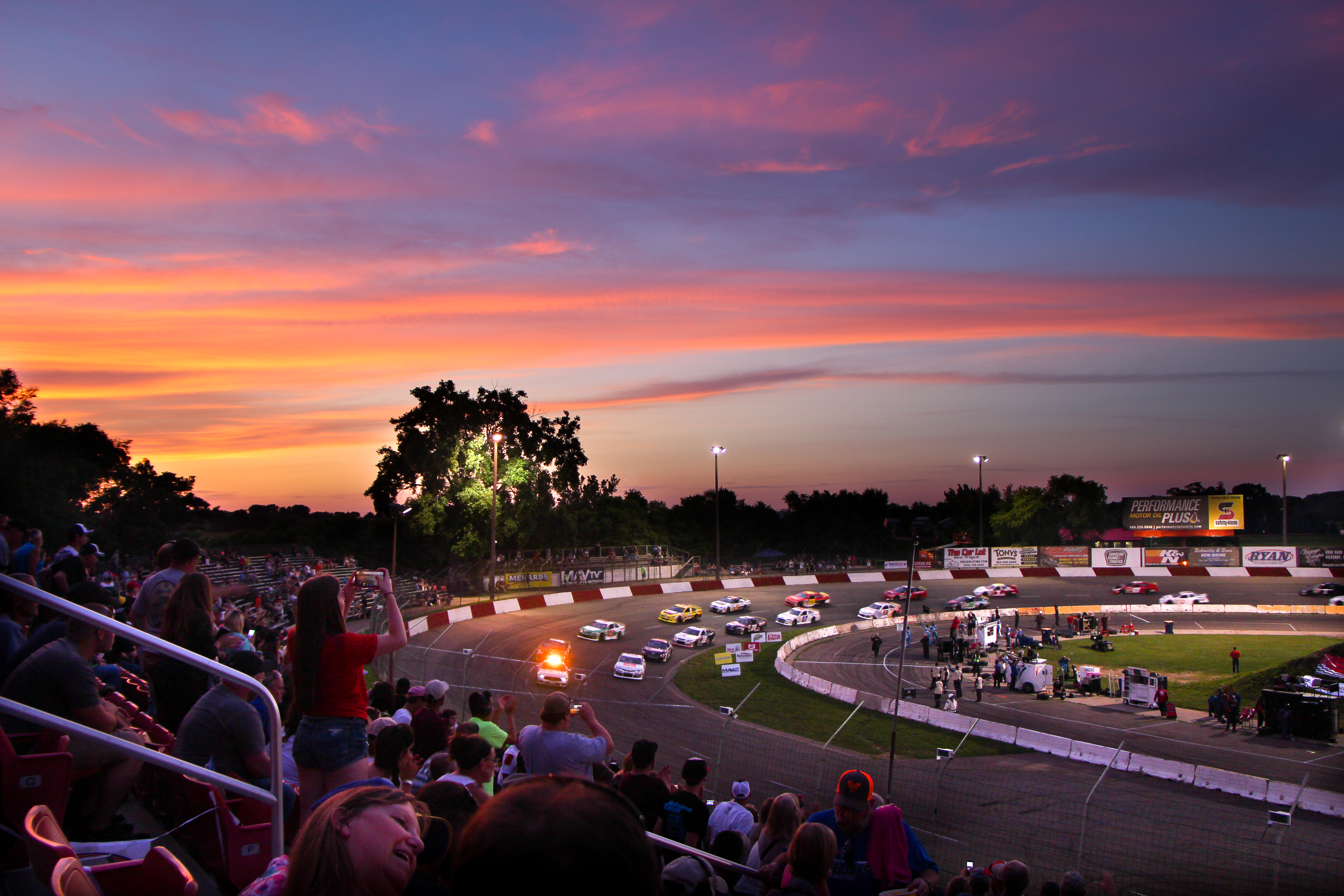
Cars at Elko

The full schedule was released on November 21, 2018. The schedule remains largely unchanged from 2018. Although some tracks swapped dates throughout the season, the only track from 2018 to be excluded in 2019 was Berlin Raceway. In turn, the only track to be added to the schedule was Five Flags Speedway. For the first time in series history, every race was aired live. 12 races were broadcast on MAVTV, while 6 were covered by FS1 and the last 2 was covered by FS2.

| No. | Race title | Track | Date | Time (EST) | Broadcaster |
|---|---|---|---|---|---|
| 1 | Lucas Oil 200 | Daytona International Speedway, Daytona Beach | February 9 | 4:45 p.m. | FS1 |
| 2 | Pensacola 200 | Five Flags Speedway, Pensacola | March 9 | 7:00 p.m. | MAVTV |
| 3 | Kentuckiana Ford Dealers 200 | Salem Speedway, Salem | April 14 | 2:15 p.m. | MAVTV |
| 4 | General Tire 200 | Talladega Superspeedway, Talladega | April 26 | 6:00 p.m. | FS1 |
| 5 | Music City 200 | Fairgrounds Speedway, Nashville | May 5^{†} | 2:00 p.m. | MAVTV |
| 6 | Sioux Chief PowerPEX 200 | Toledo Speedway, Toledo | May 19 | 2:00 p.m. | MAVTV |
| 7 | General Tire 150 | Charlotte Motor Speedway, Concord | May 23 | 9:00 p.m. | FS1 |
| 8 | General Tire #AnywhereIsPossible 200 | Pocono Raceway, Long Pond | May 31 | 5:45 p.m. | FS2 |
| 9 | VizCom 200 | Michigan International Speedway, Brooklyn | June 7 | 6:00 p.m. | FS1 |
| 10 | Shore Lunch 200 | Madison International Speedway, Oregon | June 14 | 9:00 p.m. | MAVTV |
| 11 | Day to Day Coffee 150 | World Wide Technology Raceway, Madison | June 22 | 6:00 p.m. | MAVTV |
| 12 | Bounty 150 | Chicagoland Speedway, Joilet | June 27 | 8:00 p.m. | FS1 |
| 13 | Menards 250 | Elko Speedway, Elko | July 13 | 9:00 p.m. | MAVTV |
| 14 | Fans With Benefits 150 | Iowa Speedway, Newton | July 19 | 9:00 p.m. | MAVTV |
| 15 | FORTS USA 150 | Pocono Raceway, Long Pond | July 26 | 4:00 p.m. | FS1 |
| 16 | Allen Crowe 100 | Illinois State Fairgrounds Racetrack, Springfield | August 18 | 2:30 p.m. | MAVTV |
| 17 | Southern Illinois 100 | DuQuoin State Fairgrounds Racetrack, Du Quoin | August 31 | 9:00 p.m. | MAVTV |
| 18 | Kentuckiana Ford Dealers Fall Classic 200 | Salem Speedway, Salem | September 14 | 7:15 p.m. | MAVTV |
| 19 | Herr's Potato Chips 200 | Lucas Oil Raceway, Brownsburg | October 5 | 8:00 p.m. | MAVTV |
| 20 | Kansas ARCA 150 | Kansas Speedway, Kansas City | October 18 | 8:30 p.m. | MAVTV |
^{†}The Music City 200 Presented by Inspectra Thermal Solutions was postponed from May 4 to May 5 due to rain.

== Results and standings ==
=== Races ===
| No. | Race | Pole Position | Most laps led | Winning driver | Manufacturer | No. | Winning team |
|---|---|---|---|---|---|---|---|
| 1 | Lucas Oil 200 | Christian Eckes | Harrison Burton | Harrison Burton | Toyota | 20 | Venturini Motorsports |
| 2 | Pensacola 200 | Chandler Smith | Raphaël Lessard | Michael Self | Toyota | 25 | Venturini Motorsports |
| 3 | Kentuckiana Ford Dealers 200 | Carson Hocevar | Michael Self | Michael Self | Toyota | 25 | Venturini Motorsports |
| 4 | General Tire 200 | Brandon Lynn | Sean Corr | Todd Gilliland | Toyota | 4 | DGR-Crosley |
| 5 | Music City 200 | Chandler Smith | Christian Eckes | Christian Eckes | Toyota | 15 | Venturini Motorsports |
| 6 | Sioux Chief PowerPEX 200 | Michael Self | Chandler Smith | Chandler Smith | Toyota | 20 | Venturini Motorsports |
| 7 | General Tire 150 | Michael Self | Michael Self | Ty Majeski | Ford | 22 | Chad Bryant Racing |
| 8 | General Tire#AnywhereIsPossible 200 | Harrison Burton | Riley Herbst | Ty Majeski | Ford | 22 | Chad Bryant Racing |
| 9 | VizCom 200 | Michael Self | Michael Self | Michael Self | Toyota | 25 | Venturini Motorsports |
| 10 | Shore Lunch 200 | Chandler Smith | Chandler Smith | Chandler Smith | Toyota | 20 | Venturini Motorsports |
| 11 | Day to Day Coffee 150 | Michael Self | Michael Self | Ty Gibbs | Toyota | 18 | Joe Gibbs Racing |
| 12 | Bounty 150 | Michael Self | Ty Majeski | Ty Majeski | Ford | 22 | Chad Bryant Racing |
| 13 | Menards 250 | Christian Eckes | Chandler Smith | Chandler Smith | Toyota | 20 | Venturini Motorsports |
| 14 | Fans With Benefits 150 | Chandler Smith | Chandler Smith | Chandler Smith | Toyota | 20 | Venturini Motorsports |
| 15 | FORTS USA 150 | Todd Gilliland | Todd Gilliland | Christian Eckes | Toyota | 15 | Venturini Motorsports |
| 16 | Allen Crowe 100 | Logan Seavey | Michael Self | Michael Self | Toyota | 25 | Venturini Motorsports |
| 17 | Southern Illinois 100 | Ken Schrader | Christian Eckes | Christian Eckes | Toyota | 15 | Venturini Motorsports |
| 18 | Kentuckiana Ford Dealers Fall Classic 200 | Ty Gibbs | Ty Gibbs | Ty Gibbs | Toyota | 18 | Joe Gibbs Racing |
| 19 | Herr's Potato Chips 200 | Ty Gibbs | Ty Gibbs | Chandler Smith | Toyota | 20 | Venturini Motorsports |
| 20 | ARCA Kansas 150 | Tanner Gray | Michael Self | Christian Eckes | Toyota | 15 | Venturini Motorsports |

=== Drivers' championship ===
(key) Bold – Pole position awarded by time. Italics – Pole position set by final practice results or rainout. * – Most laps led.

| Pos | Driver | DAY | FFL | SLM | TAL | NSH | TOL | CLT | POC | MCH | MAD | GTW | CHI | ELK | IOW | POC | ISF | DSF | SLM | IRP | KAN | Points |
|---|---|---|---|---|---|---|---|---|---|---|---|---|---|---|---|---|---|---|---|---|---|---|
| 1 | Christian Eckes **(R)** | 4 | 3 | INQ^{†} | 26 | 1 | 3 | 7 | 3 | 7 | 7 | 2 | 7 | 11 | 2 | 1 | 2 | 1 | 2 | 2 | 1 | 5045 |
| 2 | Michael Self | 31 | 1 | 1 | 5 | 15 | 4 | 5 | 11 | 1 | 2 | 13 | 4 | 4 | 3 | 3 | 1 | 4 | 14 | 6 | 2 | 5020 |
| 3 | Bret Holmes | 18 | 6 | 10 | 14 | 5 | 7 | 8 | 5 | 3 | 5 | 10 | 3 | 9 | 8 | 7 | 3 | 9 | 4 | 8 | 4 | 4880 |
| 4 | Travis Braden | 8 | 10 | 12 | 7 | 8 | 13 | 9 | 10 | 6 | 4 | 7 | 5 | 12 | 7 | 9 | 11 | 7 | 9 | 7 | 5 | 4780 |
| 5 | Joe Graf Jr. | 21 | 11 | 9 | 10 | 6 | 17 | 12 | 8 | 4 | 9 | 11 | 11 | 7 | 9 | 10 | 10 | 11 | 6 | 10 | 9 | 4610 |
| 6 | Tommy Vigh Jr. **(R)** | 23 | 13 | 11 | 24 | 12 | 9 | 15 | 17 | 17 | 11 | 19 | 17 | 15 | 19 | 17 | 19 | 13 | 17 | 12 | 17 | 3995 |
| 7 | Brad Smith | 19 | 16 | 19 | 16 | 20 | Wth | 23 | 15 | 13 | 15 | 15 | 16 | 19 | 17 | 16 | 16 | 16 | 18 | 19 | 20 | 3480 |
| 8 | Tim Richmond **(R)** | | 14 | 14 | | 13 | 11 | | 14 | 15 | 14 | 18 | 12 | 16 | 16 | 15 | 13 | 12 | 15 | 17 | 17 | 3170 |
| 9 | Dick Doheny | | 19 | 18 | | 17 | 15 | 24 | 18 | 18 | 17 | 14 | | 18 | QL | 18 | 12 | 19 | 20 | 18 | 21 | 2750 |
| 10 | Corey Heim **(R)** | | 5 | 5 | | 11 | 10 | | | | 10 | 4 | | 5 | 6 | 4 | 7 | 3 | 3 | 4 | | 2615 |
| 11 | Chandler Smith | | 4 | 4 | | 3 | 1 | | | | 1 | 16 | | 1 | 1 | 8 | | | 8 | 1 | | 2420 |
| 12 | Carson Hocevar | | 17 | 3 | | 4 | 6 | | | | 6 | 5 | | 6 | 4 | | 8 | 15 | 7 | 9 | | 2320 |
| 13 | Ty Gibbs | | 2 | 6 | | 2 | 2 | | | | 8 | 1 | | 2 | 5 | | 15 | | 1 | 15 | | 2315 |
| 14 | Sam Mayer | | 15 | 2 | | | 5 | | | | 3 | 3 | | 3 | | | | | 5 | 3 | | 1650 |
| 15 | Scott Melton | 32 | | | 18 | | | 14 | 13 | 9 | | | 10 | | 15 | | | | 12 | 14 | 14 | 1645 |
| 16 | Riley Herbst | 10 | | | 2 | | | | 2 | 12 | | | 6 | | | | | 6 | | | 16 | 1485 |
| 17 | Mike Basham | | 20 | 17 | | 16 | 16 | | | | | 20 | | 17 | | 19 | 18 | | 13 | 13 | | 1455 |
| 18 | Eric Caudell | 33 | | | | 14 | | | | | 13 | 12 | 14 | 13 | 13 | | 20 | | | 20 | 18 | 1450 |
| 19 | Tanner Gray | | 12 | 7 | | | 8 | 6 | | 5 | | 17 | 15 | | | | | | | | 6 | 1440 |
| 20 | Ty Majeski | | | | 4 | | | 1 | 1 | 2 | | | 1 | | | | | | | | 3 | 1375 |
| 21 | Harrison Burton | 1 | | 8 | | | | 4 | 6 | | | | 2 | | | | | | | | 12 | 1240 |
| 22 | Bobby Gerhart | 13 | | | 13 | | | | 16 | | | | | | | 12 | 14 | 12 | | 11 | | 1155 |
| 23 | Thad Moffitt | 27 | | | 25 | 9 | | 10 | | | | 9 | 9 | | | 11 | | | | | | 1110 |
| 24 | Hailie Deegan | | | | | | 18 | | 7 | | 12 | | | 8 | | | | | | 5 | 8 | 1090 |
| 25 | Gus Dean | 26 | | | 6 | | | 3 | | | | | | | | | | | | | 10 | 705 |
| 26 | Ed Pompa | | | | 21 | | | | 12 | | | | | | | 13 | | | 11 | | 15 | 635 |
| 27 | Raphaël Lessard | | 8 | | | | | | 4 | | | | | | | 5 | | | | | | 615 |
| 28 | Todd Gilliland | 2 | | | 1 | | | | | | | | | | | 2 | | | | | | 595 |
| 29 | Kaden Honeycutt | | 9 | | | 7 | | | | | | | | | 14 | | | | | | | 560 |
| 30 | Andy Seuss | 9 | | | 8 | | | 11 | | | | | | | | | | | | | | 550 |
| 31 | Brandon McReynolds | 25 | | | 19 | | | 20 | | 14 | | | | | | | | | | | | 530 |
| 32 | Gavin Harlien | | | | | | | | | | | 8 | | | 12 | | | | 16 | | | 510 |
| 33 | Con Nicolopoulos | 22 | | | 22 | | | 22 | | | | | 18 | | | | | | | | | 500 |
| 34 | Wayne Peterson | | | | | | | | | | | 22 | | | | | 21 | 20 | | | 22 | 495 |
| 35 | Morgen Baird | | | 16 | | | | | | 11 | | | 13 | | | | | | | | | 490 |
| 36 | C. J. McLaughlin | 24 | | | 11 | | | Wth^{†} | | 10 | | | | | | | | | | | | 490 |
| 37 | Alex Clubb | | | 15 | | | 12 | | | | | | | 20 | | | | | | | | 455 |
| 38 | Dale Shearer | | | | | | | | | | 18 | | | 14 | | | 17 | | | | | 445 |
| 39 | Rick Clifton | | | | | | 14 | | | | | 21 | | | 14 | | | | | | | 445 |
| 40 | Logan Seavey | | | | | | | | | | | | | | | | 4 | 2 | | | | 440 |
| 41 | Jason Miles | | | | | | | 18 | | | | | 19 | | 18 | | | | | | | 415 |
| 42 | Kelly Kovski | | | | | | | | | | | | | | | | 6 | 5 | | | | 410 |
| 43 | Sheldon Creed | | | | | | | 2 | | | | | | | | | | | | | 11 | 395 |
| 44 | Drew Dollar | | | | | | | | | | | 6 | | | | | | | | | 7 | 395 |
| 45 | Austin Wayne Self | | | | | | | | | | | | 8 | | | 6 | | | | | | 395 |
| 46 | Connor Okrzesik | | 7 | | | 10 | | | | | | | | | | | | | | | | 375 |
| 47 | Sean Corr | 5 | | | 15 | | | | | | | | | | | | | | | | | 370 |
| 48 | Ryan Unzicker | | | | | | | | | | | | | | | | 9 | 10 | | | | 365 |
| 49 | Colby Howard | | | | | | | | | | | | | | 10 | | | | 10 | | | 360 |
| 50 | Willie Mullins | 35 | | | | | | 17 | | | | | | | | 14 | | | | | | 360 |
| 51 | Will Kimmel | | | | | | | | | | | | | | | | 5 | 18 | | | | 345 |
| 52 | Codie Rohrbaugh | 7 | | | | | | 16 | | | | | | | | | | | | | | 345 |
| 53 | Bryan Dauzat | | | | 12 | | | 13 | | | | | | | | | | | | | | 335 |
| 54 | Howie DiSavino III | | | | | | | | | | | | | 10 | | | | | | 16 | | 330 |
| 55 | Connor Hall | 11 | | | | | | | | 16 | | | | | | | | | | | | 325 |
| 56 | Natalie Decker | 6 | | | 23 | | | | | | | | | | | | | | | | | 315 |
| 57 | Grant Quinlan | 3 | | | 9 | | | | | | | | | | | | | | | | | 300 |
| 58 | Darrell Basham | | | 13 | | | | | | | | | | | | | | | | 21 | | 290 |
| 59 | Benjamin Peterson | | | | | | | | | | | | | | | | | | 21 | DNS^{‡} | | 245 |
| 60 | Brandon Lynn | | | | 3 | | | | | | | | | | | | | | | | | 220 |
| 61 | Ken Schrader | | | | | | | | | | | | | | | | | 8 | | | | 200 |
| 62 | Myatt Snider | | | | | | | | | 8 | | | | | | | | | | | | 190 |
| 63 | Cole Glasson | | | | | | | | 9 | | | | | | | | | | | | | 185 |
| 64 | Tyler Dippel | 12 | | | | | | | | | | | | | | | | | | | | 170 |
| 65 | Carson Ware | | | | | | | | | | | | | | | | | | | | 13 | 165 |
| 66 | Chuck Hiers | 14 | | | | | | | | | | | | | | | | | | | | 160 |
| 67 | Leilani Münter | 15 | | | | | | | | | | | | | | | | | | | | 155 |
| 68 | Dick Karth | | | | | | | | | | 16 | | | | | | | | | | | 150 |
| 69 | Jason White | 16 | | | | | | | | | | | | | | | | | | | | 150 |
| 70 | Brian Finney | | | | | | | | | | | | | | | | | | 17 | | | 145 |
| 71 | Tyler Speer | | | | | | | | | | | | | | | | | 17 | | | | 145 |
| 72 | D. L. Wilson | | | | 17 | | | | | | | | | | | | | | | | | 145 |
| 73 | Derrick Lancaster | 17 | | | | | | | | | | | | | | | | | | | | 145 |
| 74 | Matt Dooley | | 18 | | | | | | | | | | | | | | | | | | | 140 |
| 75 | Barry Layne | | | | | 18 | | | | | | | | | | | | | | | | 140 |
| 76 | Lexi Gay | | | | | 19 | | | | | | | | | | | | | | | | 135 |
| 77 | Stefan Parsons | | | | | | | | | | | | 20 | | | | | | | | | 130 |
| 78 | Thomas Praytor | | | | 20 | | | | | | | | | | | | | | | | | 130 |
| 79 | Dave Mader III | 20 | | | | | | | | | | | | | | | | | | | | 130 |
| 80 | Devin Dodson | | | | | | | 21 | | | | | | | | | | | | | | 125 |
| 81 | J. J. Pack | 28 | | | | | | | | | | | | | | | | | | | | 90 |
| 82 | Brenden Queen **(R)** | 29 | | | | | | | | | | | | | | | | | | | | 85 |
| 83 | Paul Williamson | 30 | | | | | | | | | | | | | | | | | | | | 80 |
| 84 | John Ferrier | 34 | | | | | | | | | | | | | | | | | | | | 60 |
| 85 | Don Thompson | | | | | | | | | | | | | | | Wth^{†} | | | | | | 25 |
^{†} – Christian Eckes, C. J. McLaughlin, and Don Thompson all received 25 points for attempting practices. However, they didn't compete in the race; Eckes due to illness, and McLaughlin and Thompson due to crashing their primary cars and not having backups for the race.^{‡} – Benjamin Peterson received the points of a 22nd-place finish; however, he didn't start the race due to crashing his primary car in qualifying and not having a backup for the race.

== See also ==
- 2019 Monster Energy NASCAR Cup Series
- 2019 NASCAR Xfinity Series
- 2019 NASCAR Gander Outdoors Truck Series
- 2019 NASCAR K&N Pro Series East
- 2019 NASCAR K&N Pro Series West
- 2019 NASCAR Whelen Modified Tour
- 2019 NASCAR Pinty's Series
- 2019 NASCAR PEAK Mexico Series
- 2019 NASCAR Whelen Euro Series
- 2019 CARS Tour
