= Bret Holmes =

American racing driver (born 1997)

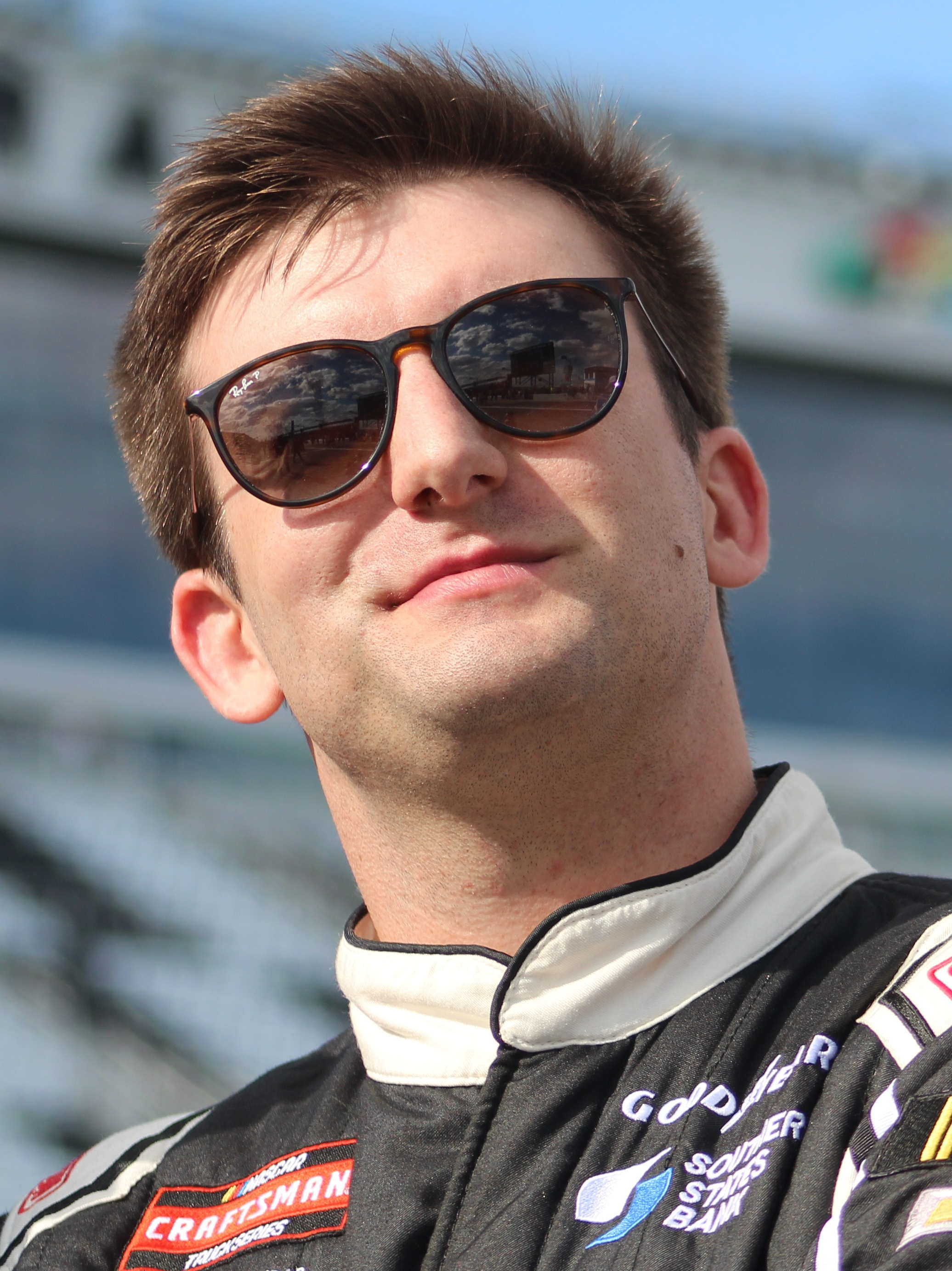
- Holmes at Daytona International Speedway in 2023
- Born: Stacy Bret Holmes; May 5, 1997 (age 29); Munford, Alabama, U.S.
- Achievements: 2020 ARCA Menards Series Champion; 2015 Show Me The Money Pro Late Model Series Champion

NASCAR FedEx Freight Truck Series career
- 57 races run over 5 years
- 2025 position: 67th
- Best finish: 20th (2024)
- First race: 2021 Bucked Up 200 (Las Vegas)
- Last race: 2025 Love's RV Stop 225 (Talladega)
Wins	Top tens	Poles
0	4	0

ARCA Menards Series career
- 88 races run over 8 years
- Best finish: 1st (2020)
- First race: 2016 Music City 200 (Fairgrounds)
- Last race: 2023 General Tire 200 (Talladega)
- First win: 2020 Dawn Ultra 150 (Kansas)
Wins	Top tens	Poles
1	69	1

ARCA Menards Series East career
- 4 races run over 2 years
- Best finish: 14th (2020)
- First race: 2020 Herr's Potato Chips 200 (Toledo)
- Last race: 2021 Shore Lunch 150 (Iowa)
Wins	Top tens	Poles
0	4	0
- Statistics up to date as of November 1, 2025.

Stacy Bret Holmes (born May 5, 1997) is an American professional stock car racing driver. He last competed part-time in the NASCAR Craftsman Truck Series, driving the No. 1 Toyota Tundra TRD Pro for Tricon Garage.

== Racing career ==
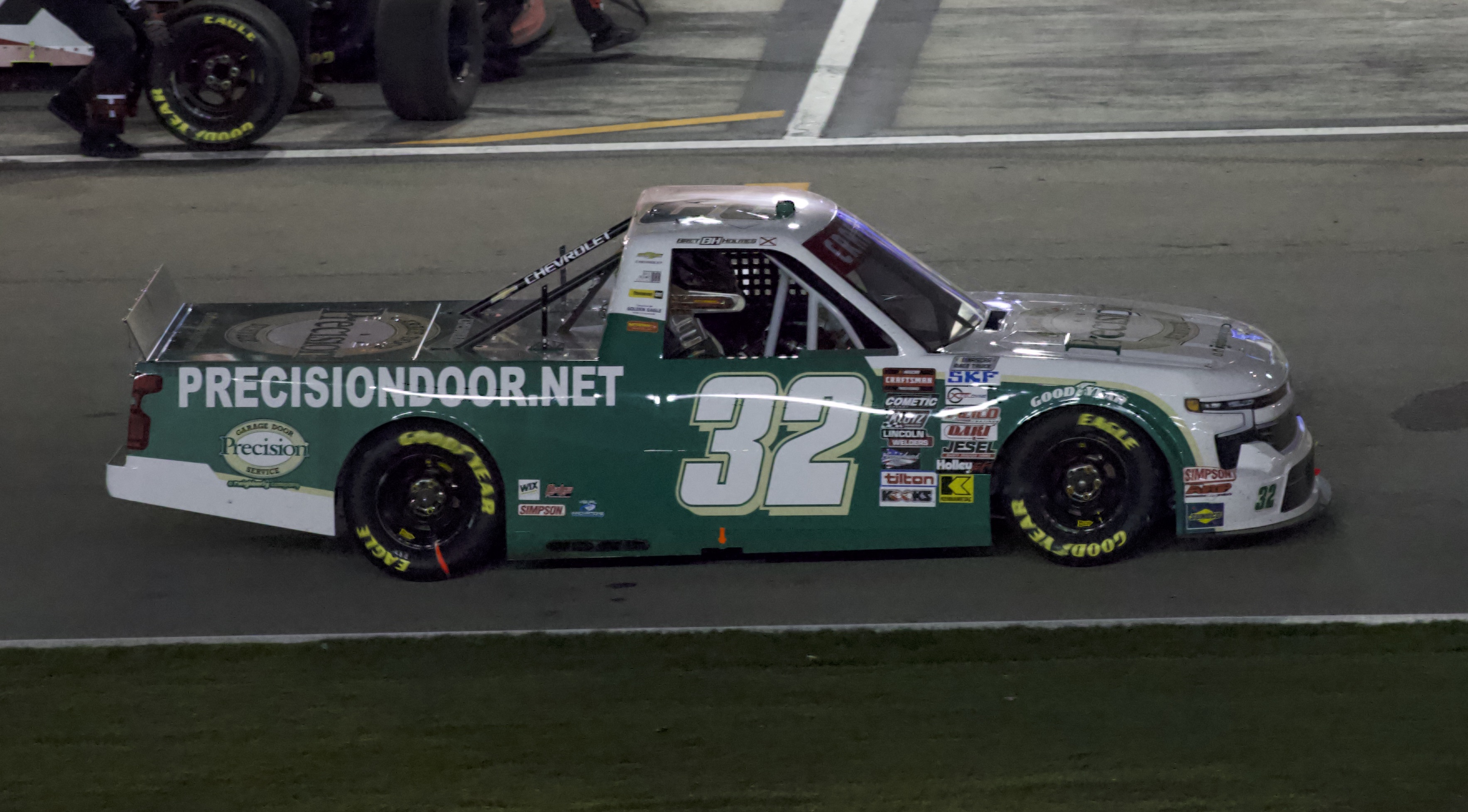
Holmes' No. 32 truck at Las Vegas Motor Speedway in 2024.

Holmes began racing when he ran in go-kart events starting at the age of eight and for four years in total, earning sixty wins altogether during that time. After that, he competed in racing series on both dirt and asphalt, which included winning the championship in the Crate Late Model Division. He later raced in the NASCAR Whelen All-American Series.

Holmes began racing in ARCA in 2016, intending to compete in the season opener at Daytona for Empire Racing in the No. 18 Ford; however, he withdrew for unknown reasons. He had previously driven with them in ARCA's preseason testing at the track in January.

After initially planning a part-time ARCA schedule in 2020 with Bret Holmes Racing, Holmes ran well at the beginning of the season and shifted to a full schedule. He claimed his first career win at Kansas Speedway after leading 82 laps of the 100-lap event. Holmes went on to finish the season with four top-five finishes in the final four races. He won the series championship by twelve points over Michael Self.

In 2021, Bret Holmes Racing expanded to include a part-time NASCAR Camping World Truck Series team for Holmes and Sam Mayer.

On October 1, 2022, at the Chevy Silverado 250 at Talladega, Holmes had narrowly beaten Rackley W.A.R. driver Matt DiBenedetto to the line but was classified as third during the caution.

On October 9, 2025, it was announced that Holmes would return to the NASCAR Craftsman Truck Series, this time driving the No. 1 Toyota for Tricon Garage.

== Personal life ==
Holmes was studying building science at Auburn University in addition to racing in ARCA in 2017.

Holmes lives in Munford, Alabama. Bret's father, Stacy Holmes, is also a former racing driver, where he often competed at the Talladega Short Track, where he held the track record until Bret himself broke it in 2013.

== Motorsports career results ==
=== NASCAR ===
(key) (Bold – Pole position awarded by qualifying time. Italics – Pole position earned by points standings or practice time. * – Most laps led.)

==== Craftsman Truck Series ====
NASCAR Craftsman Truck Series results
Year	Team	No.	Make	1	2	3	4	5	6	7	8	9	10	11	12	13	14	15	16	17	18	19	20	21	22	23	24	25	NCTC	Pts	Ref
2021	Bret Holmes Racing	32	Chevy	DAY	DRC	LVS; 37	ATL; 32	BRD	RCH	KAN; 27	DAR	COA	CLT; 36	TEX	NSH; DNQ	POC	KNX	GLN	GTW	DAR	BRI	LVS; 11	TAL; 15	MAR; 22	PHO				38th	81	
2022	Bret Holmes Racing	32	Chevy	DAY; 35	LVS; 8	ATL	COA	MAR; 24	BRD	DAR	KAN	TEX; 15	CLT	GTW	SON	KNX	NSH; DNQ	MOH	POC	IRP	RCH; 15	KAN; 17	BRI	TAL; 3	HOM; 33	PHO			33rd	148	
2023	Bret Holmes Racing	32	Chevy	DAY; 31	LVS; 34	ATL; 13	COA; 23	TEX; 23	BRD; 20	MAR; 22	KAN; 14	DAR; 23	NWS; 15	CLT; 21	GTW; 14	NSH; 34	MOH; 32	POC; 29	RCH; 29	IRP; 25	MLW; 19	KAN; 20	BRI; 27	TAL; 16	HOM	PHO			23rd	303	
2024	Bret Holmes Racing	32	Chevy	DAY; 4	ATL; 11	LVS; 12	BRI; 31	COA; 29	MAR; 24	TEX; 22	KAN; 14	DAR; 17	NWS; 29	CLT; 14	GTW; 21	NSH; 36	POC; 12	IRP; 26	RCH; 21	MLW; 26	BRI; 13	KAN; 16	TAL; 9	HOM	MAR	PHO			20th	360	
2025	Tricon Garage	1	Toyota	DAY	ATL	LVS	HOM	MAR	BRI	CAR	TEX	KAN	NWS	CLT	NSH	MCH	POC	LRP	IRP	GLN	RCH	DAR	BRI	NHA	ROV	TAL; 28	MAR	PHO	67th	9	

^{*} Season still in progress
^{1} Ineligible for series points

=== ARCA Menards Series ===
(key) (Bold – Pole position awarded by qualifying time. Italics – Pole position earned by points standings or practice time. * – Most laps led.)

ARCA Menards Series results
Year	Team	No.	Make	1	2	3	4	5	6	7	8	9	10	11	12	13	14	15	16	17	18	19	20	AMSC	Pts	Ref
2016	Bret Holmes Racing	23	Chevy	DAY	NSH; 5	SLM	TAL; 9	TOL	NJE	POC	MCH	MAD	WIN	IOW	IRP; 6	POC	BLN; 4	ISF	DSF	SLM; 3	CHI	KEN; 7	KAN; 26	21st	1310	
2017	Bret Holmes Racing	23	Chevy	DAY; 6	NSH; 13	SLM; 7	TAL; 22	TOL; 24	ELK; 4	POC; 14	MCH; 4	MAD; 7	IOW; 9	IRP; 8	POC; 14	WIN; 8	ISF; 20	ROA; 10	DSF; 12	SLM; 7	CHI; 10	KEN; 21	KAN; 10	6th	4450	
2018	Bret Holmes Racing	23	Chevy	DAY; 24	NSH; 10	SLM; 13	TAL; 27	TOL; 5	CLT; 7	POC; 13	MCH; 20	MAD; 7	GTW; 10	CHI			POC; 10							10th	2865	
2018	Ken Schrader Racing	52	Ford												IOW; 8	ELK								10th	2865	
2018	Ken Schrader Racing	52	Toyota															ISF; 6	BLN; 12	DSF	SLM	IRP	KAN	10th	2865	
2019	Bret Holmes Racing	23	Chevy	DAY; 18	FIF; 6	SLM; 10	TAL; 14	NSH; 5	TOL; 7	CLT; 8		MCH; 3	MAD; 5		CHI; 3	ELK; 9	IOW; 8	POC; 7	ISF; 3	DSF; 9			KAN; 4	3rd	4880	
2019	Bret Holmes Racing	23	Toyota								POC; 5			GTW; 10							SLM; 4	IRP; 8		3rd	4880	
2020	Bret Holmes Racing	23	Chevy	DAY; 9		TAL; 3	POC; 4	IRP; 7	KEN; 2	IOW; 3	KAN; 1*	TOL; 4	TOL; 3	MCH; 2*		GTW; 6	**I44**; 2	TOL; 4	BRI; 8	WIN; 3	MEM; 3*	ISF; 3	KAN; 2	1st	953	
2020	Bret Holmes Racing	23	Toyota		PHO; 15																			1st	953	
2020	Bret Holmes Racing	23	Ford												DRC; 8									1st	953	
2021	Bret Holmes Racing	23	Chevy	DAY; 3	PHO	TAL; 5*	KAN; 19	TOL	CLT	MOH	POC	ELK	BLN	IOW; 10	WIN	GLN	MCH	ISF	MLW	DSF	BRI	SLM	KAN	29th	141	
2022	Bret Holmes Racing	23	Chevy	DAY	PHO	TAL; 2	KAN	CLT	IOW	BLN	ELK	MOH	POC	IRP	MCH; 7	GLN	ISF	MLW	DSF	KAN	BRI	SLM	TOL	46th	80	
2023	Bret Holmes Racing	23	Chevy	DAY	PHO	TAL; 3	KAN	CLT	BLN	ELK	MOH	IOW	POC	MCH	IRP	GLN	ISF	MLW	DSF	KAN	BRI	SLM	TOL	71st	41	

==== ARCA Menards Series East ====
ARCA Menards Series East results
Year	Team	No.	Make	1	2	3	4	5	6	7	8	AMSEC	Pts	Ref
2020	Bret Holmes Racing	23	Chevy	NSM	TOL; 3	DOV	TOL; 4	BRI; 8	FIF			14th	118	
2021	Bret Holmes Racing	23	Chevy	NSM	FIF	NSV	DOV	SNM	IOW; 10	MLW	BRI	41st	34	

=== CARS Pro Late Model Tour ===
(key)

CARS Pro Late Model Tour results
Year	Team	No.	Make	1	2	3	4	5	6	7	8	9	10	11	12	13	CPLMTC	Pts	Ref
2023	Jett Motorsports	9H	Chevy	SNM	HCY	ACE	NWS; 16	TCM	DIL	CRW	WKS	HCY	TCM	SBO	TCM	CRW	62nd	17	

Sporting positions
Preceded by Christian Eckes	ARCA Menards Series Champion; 2020	Succeeded by Ty Gibbs
