= 2021 Shore Lunch 150 =

Race details
- Race 11 of 20 of the 2021 ARCA Menards Series; Race 6 of 8 of the 2021 ARCA Menards Series East; Race 5 of 10 of the 2021 Sioux Chief Showdown
- Date: July 24, 2021
- Official name: Shore Lunch 150
- Location: Iowa Speedway, Newton, Iowa
- Course: Permanent racing facility
- Course length: 0.875 miles (1.408 km)
- Distance: 150 laps, 131.25 mi (211.23 km)
- Scheduled distance: 150 laps, 131.25 mi (211.23 km)
- Average speed: 91.588 miles per hour (147.397 km/h)

Pole position
Driver	Ty Gibbs	Joe Gibbs Racing
- Time: 24.294

Most laps led
Driver	Ty Gibbs	Joe Gibbs Racing
- Laps: 149

Winner
No. 18	Ty Gibbs	Joe Gibbs Racing

Television in the United States
- Network: MAVTV
- Announcers: Bob Dillner, Jim Trebow

Radio in the United States
- Radio: ARCA Racing Network

The 2021 Shore Lunch 150 was the 11th stock car race of the 2021 ARCA Menards Series season, the sixth race of the 2021 ARCA Menards Series East season, the fifth race of the 2021 Sioux Chief Showdown season, and the 15th iteration of the event. The race was held on Saturday, July 24, in Newton, Iowa at Iowa Speedway, a 7/8 mile (1.4 km) permanent D-shaped oval racetrack. The race would take the scheduled 150 laps to complete. At race's end, Ty Gibbs of Joe Gibbs Racing would dominate the race and win his 14th career ARCA Menards Series win and his sixth of the season. To fill out the podium, Daniel Dye of GMS Racing and Taylor Gray of David Gilliland Racing would finish second and third, respectively.

== Entry list ==
#	Driver	Team	Make	Sponsor
01	Stephanie Moyer	Fast Track Racing	Toyota	Council Cup Campground, Evergreen Raceway
2	Nick Sanchez	Rev Racing	Chevrolet	Max Siegel Incorporated
6	Rajah Caruth	Rev Racing	Chevrolet	Universal Technical Institute, NASCAR Technical Institute
7	Eric Caudell	CCM Racing	Toyota	ETRM Software Consulting, Five B Cattle
10	D. L. Wilson	Fast Track Racing	Chevrolet	Leggott Trailers of Waco, Inc.
11	Bryce Haugeberg	Fast Track Racing	Chevrolet	Haugeberg Farms, Magnum Contracting, Inc.
12	Tony Cosentino	Fast Track Racing	Toyota	The Brews Box
15	Drew Dollar	Venturini Motorsports	Toyota	Sunbelt Rentals
17	Taylor Gray	David Gilliland Racing	Ford	Ripper Coffee Company
18	Ty Gibbs	Joe Gibbs Racing	Toyota	Joe Gibbs Racing
20	Corey Heim	Venturini Motorsports	Toyota	JBL
21	Daniel Dye	GMS Racing	Chevrolet	Metra Electronics, Race to Stop Suicide
23	Bret Holmes	Bret Holmes Racing	Chevrolet	Southern States Bank
25	Jesse Love	Venturini Motorsports	Toyota	Mobil 1
27	Tim Richmond	Richmond Clubb Motorsports	Chevrolet	Richmond Clubb Motorsports
30	Max Gutiérrez	Rette Jones Racing	Ford	ToughBuilt
41	?*	Cook-Finley Racing	Chevrolet	
42	Conner Jones	Cook-Finley Racing	Chevrolet	Jones Utilities
46	Thad Moffitt	David Gilliland Racing	Ford	Aqua ChemPacs, CleanPacs
48	Brad Smith	Brad Smith Motorsports	Chevrolet	Henshaw Automation
50	Morgan Alexander	Niece Motorsports	Chevrolet	Alexander Produce
54	Joey Iest	David Gilliland Racing	Ford	Basila Ranch, Ag Solutions Network
74	Mason Diaz	Visconti Motorsports	Toyota	Solid Rock Carriers
81	Sammy Smith	Joe Gibbs Racing	Toyota	Engine Ice
Official entry list

*Withdrew.

== Practice ==
=== First and final practice ===
The only 45-minute practice session would occur on Saturday, July 24, at 4:15 p.m. CST. Ty Gibbs of Joe Gibbs Racing would set the fastest time in the session with a lap of 24.649 and an average speed of 127.794 miles per hour (205.665 km/h).

Pos.	#	Driver	Team	Make	Time	Speed
1	18	Ty Gibbs	Joe Gibbs Racing	Toyota	24.649	127.794
2	20	Corey Heim	Venturini Motorsports	Toyota	24.739	127.329
3	81	Sammy Smith	Joe Gibbs Racing	Toyota	24.773	127.155
Full practice results

== Qualifying ==
Qualifying would take place on Saturday, July 24, at 6:00 p.m. CST. Drivers would all have two laps to set a time- the fastest of the two would be counted. Ty Gibbs of Joe Gibbs Racing would win the pole with a lap of 24.294 and an average speed of 129.662 miles per hour (208.671 km/h).

No drivers would fail to qualify.

=== Full qualifying results ===
Pos.	#	Driver	Team	Make	Time	Speed
1	18	Ty Gibbs	Joe Gibbs Racing	Toyota	24.294	129.662
2	21	Daniel Dye	GMS Racing	Chevrolet	24.513	128.503
3	54	Joey Iest	David Gilliland Racing	Ford	24.775	127.144
4	81	Sammy Smith	Joe Gibbs Racing	Toyota	24.804	126.996
5	46	Thad Moffitt	David Gilliland Racing	Ford	24.820	126.914
6	17	Taylor Gray	David Gilliland Racing	Ford	24.828	126.873
7	20	Corey Heim	Venturini Motorsports	Toyota	24.831	126.858
8	23	Bret Holmes	Bret Holmes Racing	Chevrolet	24.867	126.674
9	25	Jesse Love	Venturini Motorsports	Toyota	24.871	126.654
10	2	Nick Sanchez	Rev Racing	Chevrolet	24.911	126.450
11	74	Mason Diaz	Visconti Motorsports	Toyota	24.927	126.369
12	6	Rajah Caruth	Rev Racing	Chevrolet	25.171	125.144
13	15	Drew Dollar	Venturini Motorsports	Toyota	25.238	124.812
14	42	Conner Jones	Cook-Finley Racing	Chevrolet	25.300	124.506
15	30	Max Gutiérrez	Rette Jones Racing	Ford	25.473	123.660
16	27	Tim Richmond	Richmond Clubb Motorsports	Chevrolet	25.531	123.379
17	50	Morgan Alexander	Niece Motorsports	Chevrolet	25.597	123.061
18	12	Tony Cosentino	Fast Track Racing	Toyota	26.458	119.057
19	7	Eric Caudell	CCM Racing	Toyota	26.573	118.541
20	01	Stephanie Moyer	Fast Track Racing	Toyota	26.863	117.262
21	10	D. L. Wilson	Fast Track Racing	Chevrolet	27.148	116.031
22	11	Bryce Haugeberg	Fast Track Racing	Chevrolet	27.369	115.094
23	48	Brad Smith	Brad Smith Motorsports	Chevrolet	27.390	115.005
Withdrew
WD	41	?	Cook-Finley Racing	Chevrolet	—	—
Official qualifying results

== Race results ==
Fin	St	#	Driver	Team	Make	Laps	Led	Status	Pts
1	1	18	Ty Gibbs	Joe Gibbs Racing	Toyota	150	149	running	49
2	2	21	Daniel Dye	GMS Racing	Chevrolet	150	0	running	42
3	6	17	Taylor Gray	David Gilliland Racing	Ford	150	1	running	42
4	7	20	Corey Heim	Venturini Motorsports	Toyota	150	0	running	40
5	10	2	Nick Sanchez	Rev Racing	Chevrolet	150	0	running	39
6	5	46	Thad Moffitt	David Gilliland Racing	Ford	150	0	running	38
7	9	25	Jesse Love	Venturini Motorsports	Toyota	150	0	running	37
8	11	74	Mason Diaz	Visconti Motorsports	Toyota	150	0	running	36
9	12	6	Rajah Caruth	Rev Racing	Chevrolet	150	0	running	35
10	8	23	Bret Holmes	Bret Holmes Racing	Chevrolet	150	0	running	34
11	13	15	Drew Dollar	Venturini Motorsports	Toyota	150	0	running	33
12	15	30	Max Gutiérrez	Rette Jones Racing	Ford	149	0	running	32
13	16	27	Tim Richmond	Richmond Clubb Motorsports	Chevrolet	149	0	running	31
14	19	7	Eric Caudell	CCM Racing	Toyota	147	0	running	30
15	17	50	Morgan Alexander	Niece Motorsports	Chevrolet	143	0	running	29
16	21	10	D. L. Wilson	Fast Track Racing	Chevrolet	143	0	running	28
17	22	11	Bryce Haugeberg	Fast Track Racing	Chevrolet	143	0	running	27
18	4	81	Sammy Smith	Joe Gibbs Racing	Toyota	97	0	accident	26
19	23	48	Brad Smith	Brad Smith Motorsports	Chevrolet	50	0	clutch	25
20	3	54	Joey Iest	David Gilliland Racing	Ford	26	0	accident	24
21	14	42	Conner Jones	Cook-Finley Racing	Chevrolet	26	0	accident	23
22	18	12	Tony Cosentino	Fast Track Racing	Toyota	18	0	transmission	22
23	20	01	Stephanie Moyer	Fast Track Racing	Toyota	14	0	brakes	21
Withdrew
WD		41	?	Cook-Finley Racing	Chevrolet				
Official race results

Previous race: 2021 Zinsser SmartCoat 200	ARCA Menards Series; 2021 season	Next race: 2021 Calypso Lemonade 200

Previous race: 2021 Southern National 200	ARCA Menards Series East; 2021 season	Next race: 2021 Sprecher 150
