= Pensacola 150 =

ARCA race at Five Flags Speedway

ARCA Menards Series East
- Venue: Five Flags Speedway
- Location: Pensacola, Florida
- First race: 1992
- Distance: 100 mi (160 km)
- Laps: 150
- Previous names: Southern 300 (1992–1993); Southern 200 (1994); Seville Quarter Southern 200 (1995); AC Delco 200 (1996); NAPA Auto Parts 150 (2013); Pensacola 150 (2014, 2024-); Pensacola 200 presented by Inspectra Thermal Solutions (2020–2023)
- Most wins (driver): Sammy Smith (2)
- Most wins (team): Joe Gibbs Racing (3)
- Most wins (manufacturer): Toyota (5)

Circuit information
- Length: 0.5 mi (0.80 km)
- Turns: 4

The Pensacola 150 was an 100-mile (160 km) annual ARCA Menards Series East race held at Five Flags Speedway in Pensacola, Florida.

== History ==
The event has been part of the ARCA Menards Series and ARCA Menards Series East (previously the NASCAR K&N Pro Series East) schedules and has come and gone from both throughout its history. It was originally held from 1992 to 1996 in what was then known as the ARCA Bondo/Mar-Hyde Series, brought back in 2013 and 2014 as an East Series race, brought back in 2019 as an ARCA Menards Series race, and then moved back to the East Series after NASCAR's acquisition of ARCA.

The race was the season-opener for the East Series from 2023 until 2025, when the race at New Smyrna Speedway was removed from the schedule. In 2026, the season-opener was moved to Hickory Motor Speedway. The race was removed from the schedule following that announcement.

== Past winners ==
=== ARCA Menards Series ===
Year	Date	No.	Driver	Team	Manufacturer	Race Distance		Race Time	Average speed (mph)	Report	Ref
Year	Date	No.	Driver	Team	Manufacturer	Laps	Miles	Race Time	Average speed (mph)	Report	Ref
1992	March 8	16	Roy Payne	Curtis Payne	Chevrolet	300	150 (241.402)	2:07:13	70.792	Report	
1993	March 6	71	Harold Fair	Rich Hahn	Pontiac	300	150 (241.402)	2:03:59	72.629	Report	
1994	May 6	78	Gary Bradberry	Bradberry Racing	Buick	200	100 (160.934)	1:19:47	75.503	Report	
1995	May 5	75	Bob Schacht	Bob Schacht Motorsports	Buick (2)	200	100 (160.934)	1:35:21	62.926	Report	
1996	May 4	46	Frank Kimmel	Steve Rauch Racing	Pontiac (2)	200	100 (160.934)	1:39:33	56.686	Report	
1997 – 2018	Not held										
2019	March 9	25	Michael Self	Venturini Motorsports	Toyota	200	100 (160.934)	1:12:23	82.892	Report	

=== ARCA Menards Series East ===
Year	Date	No.	Driver	Team	Manufacturer	Race distance		Race time	Average speed (mph)	Report	Ref
Year	Date	No.	Driver	Team	Manufacturer	Laps	Miles (km)	Race time	Average speed (mph)	Report	Ref
2013	April 13	96	Ben Kennedy	Ben Kennedy Racing	Chevrolet	150	75 (120.701)	0:59:23	75.779	Report	
2014	June 13	41	Ben Rhodes	Turner Scott Motorsports	Chevrolet (2)	150	75 (120.701)	1:14:30	60.403	Report	
2015 – 2019	Not held										
2020	October 11	21	Sam Mayer	GMS Racing	Chevrolet (3)	206*	103 (165.762)	1:27:17	70.804	Report	
2021	February 27	18	Sammy Smith	Joe Gibbs Racing	Toyota	200	100 (160.934)	1:18:14	76.694	Report	
2022	March 19	18	Sammy Smith (2)	Kyle Busch Motorsports	Toyota (2)	200	100 (160.934)	1:41:06	59.347	Report	
2023	March 25	18	William Sawalich	Joe Gibbs Racing (2)	Toyota (3)	200	100 (160.934)	1:12:55	82.286	Report	
2024	March 23	20	Gio Ruggiero	Venturini Motorsports	Toyota (4)	150	75 (120.701)	1:00.34	74.298	Report	
2025	March 22	18	Max Reaves	Joe Gibbs Racing (3)	Toyota (5)	150	75 (120.701)	1:01.1	73.449	Report	

2020: Race extended due to a green–white–checkered finish.
