= 2020 Lucas Oil 200 =

2020 Lucas Oil 200 Driven by General Tire
Race details
- Race 1 of 20 of the 2020 ARCA Menards Series
- Date: February 8, 2020
- Official name: 57th Annual Lucas Oil 200 Driven by General Tire
- Location: Daytona Beach, Florida, Daytona International Speedway
- Course: Permanent racing facility
- Course length: 4.02 km (2.5 miles)
- Distance: 80 laps, 200 mi (321.868 km)
- Scheduled distance: 80 laps, 200 mi (321.868 km)
- Average speed: 115.663 miles per hour (186.142 km/h)

Pole position
Driver	Michael Self	Venturini Motorsports
- Time: 49.434

Most laps led
Driver	Michael Self	Venturini Motorsports
- Laps: 61

Winner
No. 25	Michael Self	Venturini Motorsports

Television in the United States
- Network: Fox Sports 1
- Announcers: Phil Parsons, David Rieff

Radio in the United States
- Radio: Motor Racing Network

The 2020 Lucas Oil 200 Driven by General Tire was the first stock car race of the 2020 ARCA Menards Series and the 57th iteration of the event. The race was held on Saturday, February 8, 2020, in Daytona Beach, Florida at Daytona International Speedway, a 2.5 miles (4.0 km) permanent triangular-shaped superspeedway. The race took the scheduled 80 laps to complete. At race's end, Michael Self of Venturini Motorsports would dominate and hold off the field to win his eighth career ARCA Menards Series win and his first of the season. To fill out the podium, Hailie Deegan of DGR-Crosley and Drew Dollar of Venturini Motorsports would finish second and third, respectively.

== Background ==
Daytona International Speedway is one of three superspeedways to hold NASCAR races, the other two being Indianapolis Motor Speedway and Talladega Superspeedway. The standard track at Daytona International Speedway is a four-turn superspeedway that is 2.5 miles (4.0 km) long. The track's turns are banked at 31 degrees, while the front stretch, the location of the finish line, is banked at 18 degrees.

=== Entry list ===
#	Driver	Team	Make	Sponsr
0	Con Nicolopoulos	Wayne Peterson Racing	Chevrolet	Great Railing
01	John Ferrier	John Ferrier Racing	Chevrolet	T&M Builders
2	?*	Chad Bryant Racing	Ford	Chad Bryant Racing
02	Andy Seuss	Our Motorsports	Chevrolet	Canto Paving, Robert B. Our Company
3	Willie Mullins	Mullins Racing	Ford	Crow Wing Recycling
4	Hailie Deegan	DGR-Crosley	Ford	Monster Energy
06	Tim Richmond	Wayne Peterson Racing	Toyota	Immigration Legal Center
7	Eric Caudell	CCM Racing	Ford	ETRM Software Consulting, TetherTech Safety
8	Sean Corr	Empire Racing	Chevrolet	Nesco Bus, Navy Seal Foundation
9	Thomas Praytor	Max Force Racing	Chevrolet	Max Force Trucking, AIDB
09	Benny Chastain	Our Motorsports	Chevrolet	Robert B. Our Company
10	Ryan Huff	Fast Track Racing	Toyota	Land & Coates Outdoor Power Equipment
11	Chuck Hiers	Fast Track Racing	Toyota	Gleckler & Sons, Ashley Home
12	Jason White	Fast Track Racing	Chevrolet	YourGMCTruckStore.com
15	Drew Dollar	Venturini Motorsports	Toyota	Dollar Concrete Construction Company, Lynx Capital
17	Tanner Gray	DGR-Crosley	Ford	Ford Performance
18	Riley Herbst	Joe Gibbs Racing	Toyota	Monster Energy
20	Ryan Repko	Venturini Motorsports	Toyota	Craftsman
22	Connor Hall	Chad Bryant Racing	Ford	Let Love Live
23	Bret Holmes	Bret Holmes Racing	Chevrolet	Southern States Bank, Holmes II Excavating
25	Michael Self	Venturini Motorsports	Toyota	Sinclair
28	David Gravel	KBR Development	Chevrolet	Chevrolet Accssories
30	Dominique Van Wieringen	Rette Jones Racing	Ford	Durobyte
32	Gus Dean	Win-Tron Racing	Chevrolet	Mashonit Apparel Co.
46	Thad Moffitt	DGR-Crosley	Ford	Performance Plus Motor Oil Richard Petty Signature Series
48	Brad Smith	Brad Smith Motorsports	Chevrolet	Copraya Web
52	Natalie Decker	Ken Schrader Racing with Fury Race Cars	Ford	N29 Technologies, LLC
61	J. J. Pack	J. J. Pack Racing	Toyota	Black Draft Distillery, Iceboxx Customs
63	Dave Mader III	Spraker Racing Enterprises	Chevrolet	American Apparel, Diamond C Ranch
69	Scott Melton	Kimmel Racing	Ford	Melton-McFadden Insurance Agency
77	Jacob Heafner	Chad Bryant Racing	Ford	Powerhouse Recycling
87	Chuck Buchanan Jr.	Charles Buchanan Racing	Chevrolet	Spring Drug
88	Scott Reeves	Reeves Racing	Chevrolet	Reeves Racing
97	Jason Kitzmiller	CR7 Motorsports	Chevrolet	Grant County Mulch
Official entry list

*Withdrew.

== Practice ==
=== First practice ===
The first one-hour session would take place on February 7. Hailie Deegan of DGR-Crosley would set the fastest time in the session, with a time of 49.027 and an average speed of 183.572 miles per hour (295.430 km/h).

Pos.	#	Driver	Team	Make	Time	Speed
1	4	Hailie Deegan	DGR-Crosley	Ford	49.027	183.572
2	15	Drew Dollar	Venturini Motorsports	Toyota	49.093	183.326
3	17	Tanner Gray	DGR-Crosley	Ford	49.122	183.217
Full first practice results

=== Second practice ===
The second and final one-hour session would take place on February 7. Connor Hall of Chad Bryant Racing would set the fastest time in the session, with a time of 49.027 and an average speed of 181.906 miles per hour (292.749 km/h).

Pos.	#	Driver	Team	Make	Time	Speed
1	22	Connor Hall	Chad Bryant Racing	Ford	49.476	181.906
2	63	Dave Mader III	Spraker Racing Enterprises	Chevrolet	49.495	181.837
3	30	Dominique Van Wieringen	Rette Jones Racing	Ford	49.568	181.569
Full final practice results

== Qualifying ==
Qualifying was held on February 8. Each driver was split into six groups, and each group would run four minute sessions. Michael Self of Venturini Motorsports would win the pole, setting a time of 49.434 and an average speed of 182.061 miles per hour (292.999 km/h).

=== Full qualifying results ===
Pos.	#	Driver	Team	Make	Time	Speed
1	25	Michael Self	Venturini Motorsports	Toyota	49.434	182.061
2	02	Andy Seuss	Our Motorsports	Chevrolet	49.438	182.046
3	63	Dave Mader III	Spraker Racing Enterprises	Chevrolet	49.448	182.009
4	12	Jason White	Fast Track Racing	Chevrolet	49.460	181.965
5	15	Drew Dollar	Venturini Motorsports	Toyota	49.474	181.914
6	18	Riley Herbst	Joe Gibbs Racing	Toyota	49.728	180.985
7	4	Hailie Deegan	DGR-Crosley	Ford	49.889	180.400
8	22	Connor Hall	Chad Bryant Racing	Ford	49.893	180.386
9	28	David Gravel	KBR Development	Chevrolet	49.915	180.307
10	30	Dominique Van Wieringen	Rette Jones Racing	Ford	49.937	180.227
11	17	Tanner Gray	DGR-Crosley	Ford	49.942	180.209
12	77	Jacob Heafner	Chad Bryant Racing	Ford	49.970	180.108
13	20	Ryan Repko	Venturini Motorsports	Toyota	50.064	179.770
14	32	Gus Dean	Win-Tron Racing	Chevrolet	50.071	179.745
15	97	Jason Kitzmiller	CR7 Motorsports	Chevrolet	50.091	179.673
16	61	J. J. Pack	J. J. Pack Racing	Toyota	50.134	179.519
17	11	Chuck Hiers	Fast Track Racing	Toyota	50.140	179.497
18	23	Bret Holmes	Bret Holmes Racing	Chevrolet	50.148	179.469
19	52	Natalie Decker	Ken Schrader Racing with Fury Race Cars	Ford	50.149	179.465
20	8	Sean Corr	Empire Racing	Chevrolet	50.150	179.462
21	3	Willie Mullins	Mullins Racing	Ford	50.156	179.440
22	9	Thomas Praytor	Max Force Racing	Chevrolet	50.227	179.186
23	69	Scott Melton	Kimmel Racing	Ford	50.843	177.016
24	01	John Ferrier	John Ferrier Racing	Chevrolet	51.028	176.374
25	09	Benny Chastain	Our Motorsports	Chevrolet	51.146	175.967
26	7	Eric Caudell	CCM Racing	Ford	51.150	175.953
27	06	Tim Richmond	Wayne Peterson Racing	Toyota	51.412	175.056
28	88	Scott Reeves	Reeves Racing	Chevrolet	51.847	173.588
29	48	Brad Smith	Brad Smith Motorsports	Chevrolet	51.852	173.571
30	10	Ryan Huff	Fast Track Racing	Toyota	51.991	173.107
31	87	Chuck Buchanan Jr.	Charles Buchanan Racing	Chevrolet	52.252	172.242
32	0	Con Nicolopoulos	Wayne Peterson Racing	Chevrolet	53.498	168.231
33	46	Thad Moffitt	DGR-Crosley	Ford	—	—
Withdrew
WD	2	?	Chad Bryant Racing	Ford	—	—
Official qualifying results

== Race results ==
Fin	St	#	Driver	Team	Make	Laps	Led	Status	Pts
1	1	25	Michael Self	Venturini Motorsports	Toyota	80	61	running	49
2	7	4	Hailie Deegan	DGR-Crosley	Ford	80	0	running	42
3	5	15	Drew Dollar	Venturini Motorsports	Toyota	80	0	running	41
4	20	8	Sean Corr	Empire Racing	Chevrolet	80	7	running	41
5	33	46	Thad Moffitt	DGR-Crosley	Ford	80	0	running	39
6	4	12	Jason White	Fast Track Racing	Chevrolet	80	0	running	38
7	6	18	Riley Herbst	Joe Gibbs Racing	Toyota	80	0	running	37
8	21	3	Willie Mullins	Mullins Racing	Ford	80	0	running	36
9	18	23	Bret Holmes	Bret Holmes Racing	Chevrolet	80	8	running	36
10	23	69	Scott Melton	Kimmel Racing	Ford	80	0	running	34
11	22	9	Thomas Praytor	Max Force Racing	Chevrolet	80	0	running	33
12	9	28	David Gravel	KBR Development	Chevrolet	79	0	running	32
13	31	87	Chuck Buchanan Jr.	Charles Buchanan Racing	Chevrolet	79	0	running	31
14	32	0	Con Nicolopoulos	Wayne Peterson Racing	Chevrolet	76	0	running	30
15	25	09	Benny Chastain	Our Motorsports	Chevrolet	75	0	running	29
16	11	17	Tanner Gray	DGR-Crosley	Ford	70	4	oil leak	29
17	26	7	Eric Caudell	CCM Racing	Ford	67	0	running	27
18	27	06	Tim Richmond	Wayne Peterson Racing	Toyota	55	0	running	26
19	17	11	Chuck Hiers	Fast Track Racing	Toyota	49	0	crash	25
20	8	22	Connor Hall	Chad Bryant Racing	Ford	47	0	overheating	24
21	30	10	Ryan Huff	Fast Track Racing	Toyota	41	0	transmission	23
22	13	20	Ryan Repko	Venturini Motorsports	Toyota	40	0	crash	22
23	14	32	Gus Dean	Win-Tron Racing	Chevrolet	40	0	crash	21
24	16	61	J. J. Pack	J. J. Pack Racing	Toyota	39	0	transmission	20
25	10	30	Dominique Van Wieringen	Rette Jones Racing	Ford	39	0	crash	19
26	19	52	Natalie Decker	Ken Schrader Racing with Fury Race Cars	Ford	38	0	crash	18
27	12	77	Jacob Heafner	Chad Bryant Racing	Ford	38	0	crash	17
28	2	02	Andy Seuss	Our Motorsports	Chevrolet	38	0	crash	16
29	24	01	John Ferrier	John Ferrier Racing	Chevrolet	38	0	crash	15
30	3	63	Dave Mader III	Spraker Racing Enterprises	Chevrolet	38	0	crash	14
31	29	48	Brad Smith	Brad Smith Motorsports	Chevrolet	17	0	oil leak	13
32	15	97	Jason Kitzmiller	CR7 Motorsports	Chevrolet	11	0	engine	12
33	28	88	Scott Reeves	Reeves Racing	Chevrolet	0	0	drive train	11
Withdrew
WD		2	?	Chad Bryant Racing	Ford				
Official race results

Previous race: 2019 Kansas ARCA 150	ARCA Menards Series; 2020 season	Next race: 2020 General Tire 150 (Phoenix)
