= 2020 Menards 200 =

2020 Menards 200 presented by Crosley Brands
Race details
- Race 10 of 20 of the 2020 ARCA Menards Series; Race 5 of 10 of the 2020 Sioux Chief Showdown
- Date: August 1, 2020
- Official name: Menards 200 presented by Crosley Brands
- Location: Toledo, Ohio, Toledo Speedway
- Course: Permanent racing facility
- Course length: 0.8 km (0.5 miles)
- Distance: 127 laps, 63.5 mi (102.193 km)
- Scheduled distance: 200 laps, 100 mi (160.934 km)
- Average speed: 73.129 miles per hour (117.690 km/h)

Pole position
Driver	Ty Gibbs	Joe Gibbs Racing
- Time: 16.030

Most laps led
Driver	Ty Gibbs	Joe Gibbs Racing
- Laps: 107

Winner
No. 21	Sam Mayer	GMS Racing

Television in the United States
- Network: MAVTV
- Announcers: Bob Dillner, Jim Tretow

Radio in the United States
- Radio: ARCA Racing Network

The 2020 Menards 200 presented by Crosley Brands was the 10th race of the 2020 ARCA Menards Series season, the fifth race of the 2020 Sioux Chief Showdown, and the second of two back-to-back races of the weekend. The race was held on Saturday, August 1, in Toledo, Ohio, at Toledo Speedway, a 0.5 miles (0.80 km) permanent oval-shaped racetrack. The race was shortened from the scheduled 200 laps to 127 due to rain. At race's end, Sam Mayer of GMS Racing would sweep the weekend, taking the lead on a late restart on lap 117 to win his second career ARCA Menards Series win and his second of the season and his second consecutive win of the season. To fill out the podium, Chandler Smith of Venturini Motorsports and Bret Holmes of Bret Holmes Racing would finish second and third, respectively.

== Background ==
Toledo Speedway opened in 1960 and was paved in 1964. In 1978 it was sold to Thomas "Sonny" Adams Sr. The speedway was reacquired by ARCA in 1999. The track also features the weekly racing divisions of sportsman on the half-mile and Figure 8, factory stock, and four cylinders on a quarter-mile track inside the big track. They also have a series of races with outlaw-bodied late models that includes four 100-lap races and ends with Glass City 200. The track hosts the “Fastest short track show in the world” which features winged sprints and winged Super Modifieds on the half mile. Toledo also used to host a 200-lap late model race until its sale to ARCA in 1999.

Toledo is known for the foam blocks that line the race track, different than the concrete walls that line many short tracks throughout America. The crumbling walls can make track cleanup a tedious task for workers.

=== Entry list ===
#	Driver	Team	Make	Sponsor
4	Hailie Deegan	DGR-Crosley	Ford	Monster Energy
06	Tim Richmond	Wayne Peterson Racing	Toyota	Wayne Peterson Racing
10	Mike Basham	Fast Track Racing	Toyota	Fast Track Racing
11	Owen Smith	Fast Track Racing	Chevrolet	Fast Track Racing
12	Rick Clifton	Fast Track Racing	Toyota	Ashville Propane
15	Drew Dollar	Venturini Motorsports	Toyota	Sunbelt Rentals
17	Taylor Gray	DGR-Crosley	Ford	Ford Performance
18	Ty Gibbs	Joe Gibbs Racing	Toyota	Monster Energy
20	Chandler Smith	Venturini Motorsports	Toyota	JBL
21	Sam Mayer	GMS Racing	Chevrolet	Why Not You Foundation
22	Derek Griffith	Chad Bryant Racing	Ford	Original Gourmet Lollipops
23	Bret Holmes	Bret Holmes Racing	Chevrolet	Holmes II Excavating
25	Michael Self	Venturini Motorsports	Toyota	Sinclair
46	Thad Moffitt	DGR-Crosley	Ford	Performance Plus Motor Oil Richard Petty Signature Series
48	Brad Smith	Brad Smith Motorsports	Chevrolet	Home Building Solutions, NASCAR Low Teams
74	Austin Green	Visconti Motorsports	Chevrolet	Sandler Capital Management
Official entry list

== Qualifying ==
Qualifying was held on Friday, July 31, at 6:30 PM EST. Qualifying was a single car, two lap system where the first lap would determine the starting position for Friday's race, and the second lap would determine the starting position for Saturday's race.

Ty Gibbs of Joe Gibbs Racing setting a time of 16.030 and an average speed of 112.289 miles per hour (180.712 km/h).

Pos.	#	Driver	Team	Make	Time	Speed
1	18	Ty Gibbs	Joe Gibbs Racing	Toyota	16.030	112.289
2	20	Chandler Smith	Venturini Motorsports	Toyota	16.070	112.010
3	21	Sam Mayer	GMS Racing	Chevrolet	16.120	111.663
4	15	Drew Dollar	Venturini Motorsports	Toyota	16.149	111.462
5	23	Bret Holmes	Bret Holmes Racing	Chevrolet	16.163	111.365
6	22	Derek Griffith	Chad Bryant Racing	Ford	16.184	111.221
7	4	Hailie Deegan	DGR-Crosley	Ford	16.198	111.125
8	17	Taylor Gray	DGR-Crosley	Ford	16.232	110.892
9	25	Michael Self	Venturini Motorsports	Toyota	16.283	110.545
10	46	Thad Moffitt	DGR-Crosley	Ford	16.324	110.267
11	74	Austin Green	Visconti Motorsports	Chevrolet	16.379	109.897
12	06	Tim Richmond	Wayne Peterson Racing	Toyota	17.356	103.711
13	10	Mike Basham	Fast Track Racing	Toyota	17.890	100.615
14	12	Rick Clifton	Fast Track Racing	Toyota	18.270	98.522
15	48	Brad Smith	Brad Smith Motorsports	Chevrolet	18.396	97.847
16	11	Owen Smith	Fast Track Racing	Chevrolet	20.089	89.601
Official qualifying results

== Race results ==
Fin	St	#	Driver	Team	Make	Laps	Led	Status	Pts
1	3	21	Sam Mayer	GMS Racing	Chevrolet	127	13	running	47
2	2	20	Chandler Smith	Venturini Motorsports	Toyota	127	7	running	44
3	5	23	Bret Holmes	Bret Holmes Racing	Chevrolet	127	0	running	41
4	9	25	Michael Self	Venturini Motorsports	Toyota	127	0	running	40
5	6	22	Derek Griffith	Chad Bryant Racing	Ford	127	0	running	39
6	7	4	Hailie Deegan	DGR-Crosley	Ford	127	0	running	38
7	11	74	Austin Green	Visconti Motorsports	Chevrolet	127	0	running	37
8	10	46	Thad Moffitt	DGR-Crosley	Ford	127	0	running	36
9	4	15	Drew Dollar	Venturini Motorsports	Toyota	127	0	running	35
10	1	18	Ty Gibbs	Joe Gibbs Racing	Toyota	127	107	running	37
11	8	17	Taylor Gray	DGR-Crosley	Ford	126	0	running	33
12	12	06	Tim Richmond	Wayne Peterson Racing	Toyota	121	0	running	32
13	14	12	Rick Clifton	Fast Track Racing	Toyota	119	0	running	31
14	15	48	Brad Smith	Brad Smith Motorsports	Chevrolet	64	0	wheel bearing	30
15	13	10	Mike Basham	Fast Track Racing	Toyota	28	0	brakes	29
16	16	11	Owen Smith	Fast Track Racing	Chevrolet	14	0	suspension	28
Official race results

Previous race: 2020 Menards.com 200	ARCA Menards Series; 2020 season	Next race: 2020 VizCom 200
