= 2020 Toyota 200 presented by Crosley Brands =

Race details
- Race 17 of 20 of the 2020 ARCA Menards Series
- Date: September 19, 2020
- Official name: 25th Annual Toyota 200 presented by Crosley Brands
- Location: Winchester, Indiana, Winchester Speedway
- Course: Permanent racing facility
- Course length: 0.5 miles (0.805 km)
- Distance: 200 laps, 100 mi (160 km)
- Scheduled distance: 200 laps, 100 mi (160 km)
- Average speed: 69.471 miles per hour (111.803 km/h)

Pole position
| Driver | Ty Gibbs | Joe Gibbs Racing |
- Time: 15.685

Most laps led
| Driver | Ty Gibbs | Joe Gibbs Racing |
- Laps: 199

Winner
| No. 18 | Ty Gibbs | Joe Gibbs Racing |

Television in the United States
- Network: MAVTV
- Announcers: Bob Dillner, Jim Tretow

Radio in the United States
- Radio: ARCA Racing Network

The 2020 Toyota 200 presented by Crosley Brands was the 17th stock car race of the 2020 ARCA Menards Series season and the 25th iteration of the event. The race was held on Saturday, September 19, 2020, in Winchester, Indiana at Winchester Speedway, a 1/2 mile (0.80 km) permanent, oval-shaped, high-banked racetrack. The race took the scheduled 200 laps to complete. At race's end, Ty Gibbs of Joe Gibbs Racing would dominate the race, winning his seventh career ARCA Menards Series win and his fifth of the season. To fill out the podium, Michael Self of Venturini Motorsports and Bret Holmes of Bret Holmes Racing would finish second and third, respectively.

== Background ==
Winchester Speedway is a half-mile paved oval motor racetrack in White River Township, Randolph County, just outside Winchester, Indiana, approximately 90 miles (145 km) northeast of Indianapolis. It seats 4000 spectators. It is also known as the "World's Fastest 1/2 mile".

The track's 37 degree banking is one of the steepest in motorsports, and the highest-banked active racetrack in the country. Notable drivers that raced at Winchester include Rusty Wallace, Mark Martin, Jeff Gordon, Tony Stewart, Ryan Newman, Sarah Fisher and Chase Briscoe.

=== Entry list ===
| # | Driver | Team | Make | Sponsor |
|---|---|---|---|---|
| 0 | Wayne Peterson | Wayne Peterson Racing | Chevrolet | Great Railing |
| 4 | Hailie Deegan | DGR-Crosley | Ford | Monster Energy |
| 06 | Con Nicolopoulos | Wayne Peterson Racing | Toyota | Wayne Peterson Racing |
| 7 | Eric Caudell | CCM Racing | Ford | ETRM Software Counseling |
| 10 | Rick Clifton | Fast Track Racing | Chevrolet | Fast Track Racing |
| 11 | Mike Basham | Fast Track Racing | Toyota | Green Renewable, Inc., Double "H" Ranch |
| 12 | Owen Smith | Fast Track Racing | Toyota | Fast Track Racing |
| 15 | Drew Dollar | Venturini Motorsports | Toyota | Sunbelt Rentals |
| 17 | Taylor Gray | DGR-Crosley | Ford | Ford Performance |
| 18 | Ty Gibbs | Joe Gibbs Racing | Toyota | Monster Energy |
| 20 | Jesse Love | Venturini Motorsports | Toyota | JBL |
| 23 | Bret Holmes | Bret Holmes Racing | Chevrolet | Holmes II Excavating |
| 25 | Michael Self | Venturini Motorsports | Toyota | Sinclair |
| 48 | Brad Smith | Brad Smith Motorsports | Chevrolet | Henshaw Automation |
Official entry list

== Practice ==
Practice was held on Saturday, September 19. Ty Gibbs of Joe Gibbs Racing would set the fastest time in the session, with a lap of 15.834 and an average speed of 113.679 miles per hour (182.949 km/h).

| Pos. | # | Driver | Team | Make | Time | Speed |
|---|---|---|---|---|---|---|
| 1 | 18 | Ty Gibbs | Joe Gibbs Racing | Toyota | 15.834 | 113.679 |
| 2 | 4 | Hailie Deegan | DGR-Crosley | Ford | 16.076 | 111.968 |
| 3 | 23 | Bret Holmes | Bret Holmes Racing | Chevrolet | 16.149 | 111.462 |
Full practice results

== Qualifying ==
Qualifying was held on Saturday, September 19, at 1:30 p.m. EST. Each driver would have two laps to set a fastest time; the fastest of the two would count as their official qualifying lap.

Ty Gibbs of Joe Gibbs Racing would win the pole, setting a time of 15.685 and an average speed of 114.759 miles per hour (184.687 km/h).

=== Full qualifying results ===
| Pos. | # | Driver | Team | Make | Time | Speed |
|---|---|---|---|---|---|---|
| 1 | 18 | Ty Gibbs | Joe Gibbs Racing | Toyota | 15.685 | 114.759 |
| 2 | 25 | Michael Self | Venturini Motorsports | Toyota | 15.842 | 113.622 |
| 3 | 20 | Jesse Love | Venturini Motorsports | Toyota | 15.857 | 113.515 |
| 4 | 23 | Bret Holmes | Bret Holmes Racing | Chevrolet | 15.981 | 112.634 |
| 5 | 17 | Taylor Gray | DGR-Crosley | Ford | 16.002 | 112.486 |
| 6 | 15 | Drew Dollar | Venturini Motorsports | Toyota | 16.100 | 111.801 |
| 7 | 4 | Hailie Deegan | DGR-Crosley | Ford | 16.118 | 111.676 |
| 8 | 11 | Mike Basham | Fast Track Racing | Toyota | 17.348 | 103.758 |
| 9 | 48 | Brad Smith | Brad Smith Motorsports | Chevrolet | 17.814 | 101.044 |
| 10 | 7 | Eric Caudell | CCM Racing | Ford | 18.062 | 99.657 |
| 11 | 10 | Rick Clifton | Fast Track Racing | Chevrolet | 18.902 | 95.228 |
| 12 | 12 | Owen Smith | Fast Track Racing | Toyota | 18.907 | 95.203 |
| 13 | 06 | Con Nicolopoulos | Wayne Peterson Racing | Toyota | 19.302 | 93.255 |
| 14 | 0 | Wayne Peterson | Wayne Peterson Racing | Chevrolet | — | — |
Official qualifying results

== Race results ==
| Fin | St | # | Driver | Team | Make | Laps | Led | Status | Pts |
|---|---|---|---|---|---|---|---|---|---|
| 1 | 1 | 18 | Ty Gibbs | Joe Gibbs Racing | Toyota | 200 | 199 | running | 49 |
| 2 | 2 | 25 | Michael Self | Venturini Motorsports | Toyota | 200 | 1 | running | 43 |
| 3 | 4 | 23 | Bret Holmes | Bret Holmes Racing | Chevrolet | 200 | 0 | running | 41 |
| 4 | 3 | 20 | Jesse Love | Venturini Motorsports | Toyota | 200 | 0 | running | 40 |
| 5 | 5 | 17 | Taylor Gray | DGR-Crosley | Ford | 200 | 0 | running | 39 |
| 6 | 6 | 15 | Drew Dollar | Venturini Motorsports | Toyota | 199 | 0 | running | 38 |
| 7 | 8 | 11 | Mike Basham | Fast Track Racing | Toyota | 194 | 0 | running | 37 |
| 8 | 10 | 7 | Eric Caudell | CCM Racing | Ford | 182 | 0 | running | 36 |
| 9 | 9 | 48 | Brad Smith | Brad Smith Motorsports | Chevrolet | 175 | 0 | running | 35 |
| 10 | 13 | 06 | Con Nicolopoulos | Wayne Peterson Racing | Toyota | 170 | 0 | running | 34 |
| 11 | 11 | 10 | Rick Clifton | Fast Track Racing | Chevrolet | 168 | 0 | running | 33 |
| 12 | 7 | 4 | Hailie Deegan | DGR-Crosley | Ford | 109 | 0 | crash | 32 |
| 13 | 12 | 12 | Owen Smith | Fast Track Racing | Toyota | 4 | 0 | brakes | 31 |
| 14 | 14 | 0 | Wayne Peterson | Wayne Peterson Racing | Chevrolet | 2 | 0 | valve spring | 30 |
Official race results

| Previous race: 2020 Bush's Beans 200 | ARCA Menards Series; 2020 season | Next race: 2020 Sioux Chief PowerPEX 200 |
