= 2020 VizCom 200 =

Race details
- Race 11 of 20 of the 2020 ARCA Menards Series
- Date: August 9, 2020
- Official name: 32nd Annual VizCom 200
- Location: Brooklyn, Michigan, Michigan International Speedway
- Course: Permanent racing facility
- Course length: 3.2 km (2 miles)
- Distance: 100 laps, 200 mi (321.869 km)
- Scheduled distance: 100 laps, 200 mi (321.869 km)
- Average speed: 131.267 miles per hour (211.254 km/h)

Pole position
Driver	Riley Herbst	Joe Gibbs Racing
- Time: Set by 2020 owner's points

Most laps led
Driver	Bret Holmes	Bret Holmes Racing
- Laps: 61

Winner
No. 18	Riley Herbst	Joe Gibbs Racing

Television in the United States
- Network: MAVTV
- Announcers: Bob Dillner, Jim Tretow

Radio in the United States
- Radio: Motor Racing Network

The 2020 VizCom 200 was the 11th stock car race of the 2020 ARCA Menards Series and the 32nd iteration of the event. The race was held on Sunday, August 9, 2020, in Brooklyn, Michigan at Michigan International Speedway, a two-mile (3.2 km) moderate-banked D-shaped speedway. The race took the scheduled 100 laps to complete. At race's end, Riley Herbst of Joe Gibbs Racing would dominate the late stages of the race to win his second and to date, final career ARCA Menards Series win and his first and only win of the season. To fill out the podium, Bret Holmes of Bret Holmes Racing and Michael Self of Venturini Motorsports would finish second and third, respectively.

== Background ==
The race was held at Michigan International Speedway, a two-mile (3.2 km) moderate-banked D-shaped speedway located in Brooklyn, Michigan. The track is used primarily for NASCAR events. It is known as a "sister track" to Texas World Speedway as MIS's oval design was a direct basis of TWS, with moderate modifications to the banking in the corners, and was used as the basis of Auto Club Speedway. The track is owned by International Speedway Corporation. Michigan International Speedway is recognized as one of motorsports' premier facilities because of its wide racing surface and high banking (by open-wheel standards; the 18-degree banking is modest by stock car standards).

=== Entry list ===
#	Driver	Team	Make	Sponsor
0	Con Nicolopoulos	Wayne Peterson Racing	Chevrolet	Wayne Peterson Racing
4	Hailie Deegan	DGR-Crosley	Ford	Monster Energy
06	Tim Richmond	Wayne Peterson Racing	Toyota	Immigration Legal Center
10	Morgen Baird	Fast Track Racing	Ford	Fast Track Racing
11	Mike Basham	Fast Track Racing	Chevrolet	Fast Track Racing
12	Armani Williams	Fast Track Racing	Chevrolet	Centria Autism
15	Drew Dollar	Venturini Motorsports	Toyota	Sunbelt Rentals
17	Anthony Alfredo	DGR-Crosley	Ford	Crosley Brands
18	Riley Herbst	Joe Gibbs Racing	Toyota	Monster Energy
20	Ryan Repko	Venturini Motorsports	Toyota	Craftsman
21	Kris Wright	GMS Racing	Chevrolet	GMS Racing
22	?	Chad Bryant Racing	Ford	Chad Bryant Racing
23	Bret Holmes	Bret Holmes Racing	Chevrolet	Holmes II Excavating
25	Michael Self	Venturini Motorsports	Toyota	Sinclair
46	Thad Moffitt	DGR-Crosley	Ford	Performance Plus Motor Oil Richard Petty Signature Series
48	Brad Smith	Brad Smith Motorsports	Chevrolet	Henshaw Automation
69	Scott Melton	Kimmel Racing	Chevrolet	Melton-McFadden Insurance Agency
97	Jason Kitzmiller	CR7 Motorsports	Chevrolet	A. L. L. Construction
Official entry list

== Practice ==
The only 30-minute practice session was held on Sunday, August 9. Bret Holmes of Bret Holmes Racing would set the fastest time in the session, with a lap of 39.126 and an average speed of 184.021 miles per hour (296.153 km/h).

Pos.	#	Driver	Team	Make	Time	Speed
1	23	Bret Holmes	Bret Holmes Racing	Chevrolet	39.126	184.021
2	15	Drew Dollar	Venturini Motorsports	Toyota	39.190	183.720
3	25	Michael Self	Venturini Motorsports	Toyota	39.433	182.588
Full practice results

== Starting lineup ==
As no qualifying session was held, the starting lineup was determined by the current 2020 owner's points. As a result, Riley Herbst of Joe Gibbs Racing would win the pole.

=== Full starting lineup ===
Pos.	#	Driver	Team	Make
1	18	Riley Herbst	Joe Gibbs Racing	Toyota
2	20	Ryan Repko	Venturini Motorsports	Toyota
3	25	Michael Self	Venturini Motorsports	Toyota
4	23	Bret Holmes	Bret Holmes Racing	Chevrolet
5	15	Drew Dollar	Venturini Motorsports	Toyota
6	17	Anthony Alfredo	DGR-Crosley	Ford
7	4	Hailie Deegan	DGR-Crosley	Ford
8	46	Thad Moffitt	DGR-Crosley	Ford
9	12	Armani Williams	Fast Track Racing	Chevrolet
10	11	Mike Basham	Fast Track Racing	Chevrolet
11	10	Morgen Baird	Fast Track Racing	Ford
12	06	Tim Richmond	Wayne Peterson Racing	Toyota
13	69	Scott Melton	Kimmel Racing	Chevrolet
14	48	Brad Smith	Brad Smith Motorsports	Chevrolet
15	21	Kris Wright	GMS Racing	Chevrolet
16	97	Jason Kitzmiller	CR7 Motorsports	Chevrolet
17	0	Con Nicolopoulos	Wayne Peterson Racing	Chevrolet
WD	22	?	Chad Bryant Racing	Ford
Official starting lineup

== Race results ==
Fin	St	#	Driver	Team	Make	Laps	Led	Status	Pts
1	1	18	Riley Herbst	Joe Gibbs Racing	Toyota	100	39	running	47
2	4	23	Bret Holmes	Bret Holmes Racing	Chevrolet	100	61	running	44
3	3	25	Michael Self	Venturini Motorsports	Toyota	100	0	running	41
4	5	15	Drew Dollar	Venturini Motorsports	Toyota	100	0	running	40
5	6	17	Anthony Alfredo	DGR-Crosley	Ford	100	0	running	39
6	7	4	Hailie Deegan	DGR-Crosley	Ford	100	0	running	38
7	2	20	Ryan Repko	Venturini Motorsports	Toyota	99	0	running	37
8	16	97	Jason Kitzmiller	CR7 Motorsports	Chevrolet	99	0	running	36
9	8	46	Thad Moffitt	DGR-Crosley	Ford	99	0	running	35
10	9	12	Armani Williams	Fast Track Racing	Chevrolet	96	0	running	34
11	12	06	Tim Richmond	Wayne Peterson Racing	Toyota	93	0	running	33
12	14	48	Brad Smith	Brad Smith Motorsports	Chevrolet	86	0	running	32
13	13	69	Scott Melton	Kimmel Racing	Chevrolet	54	0	mechanical	31
14	15	21	Kris Wright	GMS Racing	Chevrolet	52	0	crash	30
15	11	10	Morgen Baird	Fast Track Racing	Ford	21	0	brakes	29
16	17	0	Con Nicolopoulos	Wayne Peterson Racing	Chevrolet	17	0	oil leak	28
17	10	11	Mike Basham	Fast Track Racing	Chevrolet	9	0	transmission	27
Withdrew
WD		22	?	Chad Bryant Racing	Ford				
Official race results

Previous race: 2020 Menards 200	ARCA Menards Series; 2020 season	Next race: 2020 General Tire 100
