= 2020 Shore Lunch 150 =

Race details
- Race 7 of 20 of the 2020 ARCA Menards Series; Race 3 of 10 of the 2020 Sioux Chief Showdown
- Date: July 18, 2020
- Official name: 14th Annual Shore Lunch 150
- Location: Newton, Iowa, Iowa Speedway
- Course: Permanent racing facility
- Course length: 0.875 miles (1.408 km)
- Distance: 150 laps, 131.25 mi (211.23 km)
- Scheduled distance: 150 laps, 131.25 mi (211.23 km)
- Average speed: 95.59 miles per hour (153.84 km/h)

Pole position
Driver	Chandler Smith	Venturini Motorsports
- Time: Set by 2020 owner's points

Most laps led
Driver	Ty Gibbs	Joe Gibbs Racing
- Laps: 140

Winner
No. 18	Ty Gibbs	Joe Gibbs Racing

Television in the United States
- Network: MAVTV
- Announcers: Bob Dillner, Jim Trebow

Radio in the United States
- Radio: ARCA Racing Network

The 2020 Shore Lunch 150 was the seventh stock car race of the 2020 ARCA Menards Series, the third race of the 2020 Sioux Chief Showdown, and the 14th iteration of the event. The race was held on Saturday, July 18, 2020, in Newton, Iowa at Iowa Speedway, a 7/8 mile (1.4 km) permanent D-shaped oval racetrack. The race took the scheduled 150 laps to complete. At race's end, Ty Gibbs of Joe Gibbs Racing would dominate and win his fifth career ARCA Menards Series win and his third of the season. To fill out the podium, Sam Mayer of GMS Racing and Bret Holmes of Bret Holmes Racing would finish second and third, respectively.

== Background ==
Iowa Speedway is a 7/8-mile (1.4 km) paved oval motor racing track in Newton, Iowa, United States, approximately 30 miles (48 km) east of Des Moines. The track was designed with influence from Rusty Wallace and patterned after Richmond Raceway, a short track where Wallace was very successful. It has over 25,000 permanent seats as well as a unique multi-tiered Recreational Vehicle viewing area along the backstretch.

=== Entry list ===
#	Driver	Team	Make	Sponsor
1	Max McLaughlin	Hattori Racing Enterprises	Toyota	Toyota Racing Development
4	Hailie Deegan	DGR-Crosley	Ford	Monster Energy
06	Tim Richmond	Wayne Peterson Racing	Toyota	Wayne Peterson Racing
7	Eric Caudell*	CCM Racing	Ford	Caudell Sports Marketing
10	Mike Basham	Fast Track Racing	Toyota	Fast Track Racing
11	Dick Doheny	Fast Track Racing	Chevrolet	Fast Track Racing
12	Rick Clifton	Fast Track Racing	Toyota	Fast Track Racing
15	Drew Dollar	Venturini Motorsports	Toyota	Dollar Concrete Construction Company, Lynx Capital
16	Gio Scelzi	Bill McAnally Racing	Toyota	NAPA Auto Parts
17	Taylor Gray	DGR-Crosley	Ford	Ford Performance
18	Ty Gibbs	Joe Gibbs Racing	Toyota	Monster Energy
19	Jesse Love	Bill McAnally Racing	Toyota	NAPA Power Premium Plus
20	Chandler Smith	Venturini Motorsports	Toyota	JBL
21	Sam Mayer	GMS Racing	Chevrolet	QPS Employment Group
22	Kody Swanson	Chad Bryant Racing	Ford	Fatheadz Eyewear
23	Bret Holmes	Bret Holmes Racing	Chevrolet	Holmes II Excavating
25	Michael Self	Venturini Motorsports	Toyota	Sinclair
32	Howie DiSavino III	Win-Tron Racing	Chevrolet	Bud's Plumbing, Kees Travel
46	Thad Moffitt	DGR-Crosley	Ford	Performance Plus Motor Oil Richard Petty Signature Series
48	Brad Smith	Brad Smith Motorsports	Chevrolet	Home Building Solutions, NASCAR Low Teams
69	Scott Melton	Kimmel Racing	Ford	Melton-McFadden Insurance Agency
99	Gracie Trotter	Bill McAnally Racing	Toyota	Eneos
Official entry list

== Practice ==
The only one-hour practice session would occur on Saturday, July 18. Ty Gibbs of Joe Gibbs Racing would set the fastest time in the session, with a lap of 24.894 and an average speed of 126.537 miles per hour (203.642 km/h).

Pos.	#	Driver	Team	Make	Time	Speed
1	18	Ty Gibbs	Joe Gibbs Racing	Toyota	24.894	126.537
2	1	Max McLaughlin	Hattori Racing Enterprises	Toyota	25.095	125.523
3	21	Sam Mayer	GMS Racing	Chevrolet	25.204	124.980
Full practice results

== Starting lineup ==
ARCA would not hold a qualifying session for the race. Therefore, the current 2020 owner's standings would be determined for who got the pole. As a result, Chandler Smith of Venturini Motorsports won the pole.

=== Full starting lineup ===
Pos.	#	Driver	Team	Make
1	20	Chandler Smith	Venturini Motorsports	Toyota
2	17	Taylor Gray	DGR-Crosley	Ford
3	25	Michael Self	Venturini Motorsports	Toyota
4	4	Hailie Deegan	DGR-Crosley	Ford
5	18	Ty Gibbs	Joe Gibbs Racing	Toyota
6	23	Bret Holmes	Bret Holmes Racing	Chevrolet
7	21	Sam Mayer	GMS Racing	Chevrolet
8	46	Thad Moffitt	DGR-Crosley	Ford
9	22	Kody Swanson	Chad Bryant Racing	Ford
10	15	Drew Dollar	Venturini Motorsports	Toyota
11	11	Dick Doheny	Fast Track Racing	Chevrolet
12	12	Rick Clifton	Fast Track Racing	Toyota
13	10	Mike Basham	Fast Track Racing	Toyota
14	1	Max McLaughlin	Hattori Racing Enterprises	Toyota
15	16	Gio Scelzi	Bill McAnally Racing	Toyota
16	69	Scott Melton	Kimmel Racing	Ford
17	19	Jesse Love	Bill McAnally Racing	Toyota
18	48	Brad Smith	Brad Smith Motorsports	Chevrolet
19	06	Tim Richmond	Wayne Peterson Racing	Toyota
20	32	Howie DiSavino III	Win-Tron Racing	Chevrolet
21	99	Gracie Trotter	Bill McAnally Racing	Toyota
Withdrew
WD	7	Eric Caudell	CCM Racing	Ford
Official starting lineup

== Race results ==
Fin	St	#	Driver	Team	Make	Laps	Led	Status	Pts
1	5	18	Ty Gibbs	Joe Gibbs Racing	Toyota	150	140	running	48
2	7	21	Sam Mayer	GMS Racing	Chevrolet	150	0	running	42
3	6	23	Bret Holmes	Bret Holmes Racing	Chevrolet	150	0	running	41
4	1	20	Chandler Smith	Venturini Motorsports	Toyota	150	10	running	41
5	2	17	Taylor Gray	DGR-Crosley	Ford	150	0	running	39
6	3	25	Michael Self	Venturini Motorsports	Toyota	150	0	running	38
7	14	1	Max McLaughlin	Hattori Racing Enterprises	Toyota	150	0	running	37
8	9	22	Kody Swanson	Chad Bryant Racing	Ford	150	0	running	36
9	21	99	Gracie Trotter	Bill McAnally Racing	Toyota	150	0	running	35
10	8	46	Thad Moffitt	DGR-Crosley	Ford	149	0	running	34
11	15	16	Gio Scelzi	Bill McAnally Racing	Toyota	148	0	running	33
12	17	19	Jesse Love	Bill McAnally Racing	Toyota	144	0	running	32
13	19	06	Tim Richmond	Wayne Peterson Racing	Toyota	142	0	running	31
14	12	12	Rick Clifton	Fast Track Racing	Toyota	139	0	running	30
15	16	69	Scott Melton	Kimmel Racing	Ford	136	0	running	29
16	20	32	Howie DiSavino III	Win-Tron Racing	Chevrolet	110	0	electrical	28
17	10	15	Drew Dollar	Venturini Motorsports	Toyota	108	0	running	27
18	4	4	Hailie Deegan	DGR-Crosley	Ford	96	0	rear end	26
19	18	48	Brad Smith	Brad Smith Motorsports	Chevrolet	95	0	overheating	25
20	13	10	Mike Basham	Fast Track Racing	Toyota	36	0	vibration	24
21	11	11	Dick Doheny	Fast Track Racing	Chevrolet	15	0	sway bar	23
Withdrew
WD		7	Eric Caudell	CCM Racing	Ford				
Official race results

Previous race: 2020 General Tire 150 (Kentucky)	ARCA Menards Series; 2020 season	Next race: 2020 Dawn Ultra 150
