= 2020 Sioux Chief PowerPEX 200 =

Race details
- Race 18 of 20 of the 2020 ARCA Menards Series; Race 10 of 10 of the 2020 Sioux Chief Showdown
- Date: September 26, 2020
- Official name: 4th Annual Sioux Chief PowerPEX 200
- Location: Memphis, Tennessee, Memphis International Raceway
- Course: Permanent racing facility
- Course length: 0.75 miles (1.21 km)
- Distance: 200 laps, 150 mi (241.401 km)
- Scheduled distance: 200 laps, 150 mi (241.401 km)
- Average speed: 85.933 miles per hour (138.296 km/h)

Pole position
Driver	Ty Gibbs	Joe Gibbs Racing
- Time: 23.219

Most laps led
Driver	Bret Holmes	Bret Holmes Racing
- Laps: 135

Winner
No. 18	Ty Gibbs	Joe Gibbs Racing

Television in the United States
- Network: MAVTV
- Announcers: Bob Dillner, Jim Tretow

Radio in the United States
- Radio: ARCA Racing Network

The 2020 Sioux Chief PowerPEX 200 was the 18th stock car race of the 2020 ARCA Menards Series, the tenth and final race of the 2020 Sioux Chief Showdown, and the fourth iteration of the event. The race was held on Saturday, September 26, 2020, in Memphis, Tennessee, at Memphis International Raceway, a 3/4 mile (1.2 km) tri-oval short track. The race took the scheduled 200 laps to complete. At race's end, Ty Gibbs of Joe Gibbs Racing would hold off the field on the final restart with three to go to win his eighth career ARCA Menards Series win and his sixth and final win of the season. Meanwhile, second-place finisher, GMS Racing driver Sam Mayer, would narrowly hold off Gibbs by 5 points to win the inaugural Sioux Chief Showdown championship.

== Background ==
Memphis International Raceway (formerly known as Memphis Motorsports Park) is an auto racing park located near the Loosahatchie River in Shelby County, Tennessee, United States, just approximately ten miles south of Millington, and a few miles north of the city of Memphis. The facility opened in 1987 with a drag strip and 1.8-mile (2.9 km) road course. It includes a 3/4-mile tri-oval short track, built in 1998, which once hosted the NASCAR Xfinity Series and Camping World Truck Series, as well as an ASA Late Model Series race. The 4,400-foot (1,340 m) drag strip hosts events such as International Hot Rod Association (IHRA) World Finals and Nitro Jam, Professional Drag Racers Association (PDRA), HOT ROD Power Tour, Super Chevy Show, Fun Ford Series and Mega Mopar Action Series.

=== Entry list ===
#	Driver	Team	Make	Sponsor
0	Wayne Peterson	Wayne Peterson Racing	Chevrolet	Wayne Peterson Racing
4	Hailie Deegan	DGR-Crosley	Ford	Monster Energy
06	Tim Richmond	Wayne Peterson Racing	Toyota	Great Railing
7	Eric Caudell	CCM Racing	Ford	ETRM Software Counseling
10	Mike Basham	Fast Track Racing	Toyota	Fast Track Racing
11	Richard Garvie	Fast Track Racing	Toyota	The Brews Box
12	D. L. Wilson	Fast Track Racing	Chevrolet	Tradinghouse Bar & Grill
15	Drew Dollar	Venturini Motorsports	Toyota	Sunbelt Rentals
17	Taylor Gray	DGR-Crosley	Ford	Ford Performance
18	Ty Gibbs	Joe Gibbs Racing	Toyota	Monster Energy
20	Chandler Smith	Venturini Motorsports	Toyota	JBL
21	Sam Mayer	GMS Racing	Chevrolet	Kevin Love Fund "You Are Great"
22	Kris Wright	Chad Bryant Racing	Chevrolet	Mastertech, FNB Corporation
23	Bret Holmes	Bret Holmes Racing	Chevrolet	Holmes II Excavating
25	Michael Self	Venturini Motorsports	Toyota	Sinclair
32	Gus Dean	Win-Tron Racing	Chevrolet	Mashonit
46	Thad Moffitt	DGR-Crosley	Ford	CleanPacs
48	Brad Smith	Brad Smith Motorsports	Chevrolet	Henshaw Automation
Official entry list

== Practice ==
The only practice session was held on Saturday, September 26. Ty Gibbs of Joe Gibbs Racing would set the fastest time in the session, with a lap of 23.435 and an average speed of 115.212 miles per hour (185.416 km/h).

Pos.	#	Driver	Team	Make	Time	Speed
1	18	Ty Gibbs	Joe Gibbs Racing	Toyota	23.435	115.212
2	21	Sam Mayer	GMS Racing	Chevrolet	23.474	115.021
3	20	Chandler Smith	Venturini Motorsports	Toyota	23.478	115.001
Full practice results

== Qualifying ==
Qualifying was held on Saturday, September 26, at 4:00 PM EST. Each driver would have two laps to set a fastest time; the fastest of the two would count as their official qualifying lap.

Ty Gibbs of Joe Gibbs Racing would win the pole, setting a time of 23.219 and an average speed of 116.284 miles per hour (187.141 km/h).

=== Full qualifying results ===
Pos.	#	Driver	Team	Make	Time	Speed
1	18	Ty Gibbs	Joe Gibbs Racing	Toyota	23.219	116.284
2	23	Bret Holmes	Bret Holmes Racing	Chevrolet	23.311	115.825
3	4	Hailie Deegan	DGR-Crosley	Ford	23.454	115.119
4	21	Sam Mayer	GMS Racing	Chevrolet	23.463	115.075
5	15	Drew Dollar	Venturini Motorsports	Toyota	23.556	114.620
6	17	Taylor Gray	DGR-Crosley	Ford	23.588	114.465
7	25	Michael Self	Venturini Motorsports	Toyota	23.723	113.814
8	20	Chandler Smith	Venturini Motorsports	Toyota	23.744	113.713
9	22	Kris Wright	Chad Bryant Racing	Chevrolet	23.902	112.961
10	46	Thad Moffitt	DGR-Crosley	Ford	23.933	112.815
11	32	Gus Dean	Win-Tron Racing	Chevrolet	23.942	112.773
12	06	Tim Richmond	Wayne Peterson Racing	Toyota	24.779	108.963
13	7	Eric Caudell	CCM Racing	Ford	25.012	107.948
14	10	Mike Basham	Fast Track Racing	Toyota	25.321	106.631
15	12	D. L. Wilson	Fast Track Racing	Chevrolet	26.296	102.677
16	48	Brad Smith	Brad Smith Motorsports	Chevrolet	—	—
17	0	Wayne Peterson	Wayne Peterson Racing	Chevrolet	—	—
18	11	Richard Garvie	Fast Track Racing	Toyota	—	—
Official qualifying results

== Race results ==
Fin	St	#	Driver	Team	Make	Laps	Led	Status	Pts
1	1	18	Ty Gibbs	Joe Gibbs Racing	Toyota	200	58	running	48
2	4	21	Sam Mayer	GMS Racing	Chevrolet	200	0	running	42
3	2	23	Bret Holmes	Bret Holmes Racing	Chevrolet	200	135	running	43
4	10	46	Thad Moffitt	DGR-Crosley	Ford	200	0	running	40
5	8	20	Chandler Smith	Venturini Motorsports	Toyota	200	0	running	39
6	7	25	Michael Self	Venturini Motorsports	Toyota	200	0	running	38
7	3	4	Hailie Deegan	DGR-Crosley	Ford	200	0	running	37
8	5	15	Drew Dollar	Venturini Motorsports	Toyota	200	7	running	37
9	6	17	Taylor Gray	DGR-Crosley	Ford	198	0	running	35
10	9	22	Kris Wright	Chad Bryant Racing	Chevrolet	198	0	running	34
11	11	32	Gus Dean	Win-Tron Racing	Chevrolet	195	0	running	33
12	14	10	Mike Basham	Fast Track Racing	Toyota	192	0	running	32
13	12	06	Tim Richmond	Wayne Peterson Racing	Toyota	189	0	running	31
14	13	7	Eric Caudell	CCM Racing	Ford	57	0	battery	30
15	16	48	Brad Smith	Brad Smith Motorsports	Chevrolet	41	0	transmission	29
16	15	12	D. L. Wilson	Fast Track Racing	Chevrolet	18	0	overheating	28
17	17	0	Wayne Peterson	Wayne Peterson Racing	Chevrolet	2	0	vibration	27
18	18	11	Richard Garvie	Fast Track Racing	Toyota	0	0	did not start	3
Official race results

Previous race: 2020 Toyota 200 presented by Crosley Brands	ARCA Menards Series; 2020 season	Next race: 2020 Illinois Truck & Equipment Allen Crowe 100
