= Ryan Repko =

American racing driver (born 1999)

- Born: Ryan T. Repko; October 1, 1999 (age 27); Denver, North Carolina, U.S.
- Achievements: 2019 Throwback 276 Winner (LMSC); 2018 Bobby Isaac Memorial Winner

NASCAR O'Reilly Auto Parts Series career
- 3 races run over 1 year
- 2019 position: 50th
- Best finish: 50th (2019)
- First race: 2019 CircuitCity.com 250 (Iowa)
- Last race: 2019 Go Bowling 250 (Richmond)
Wins	Top tens	Poles
0	0	0

ARCA Menards Series career
- 7 races run over 3 years
- Best finish: 23rd (2020)
- First race: 2017 Montgomery Ward 200 (Madison)
- Last race: 2020 VizCom 200 (Michigan)
Wins	Top tens	Poles
0	5	0

ARCA Menards Series East career
- 1 race run over 1 year
- Best finish: 33rd (2020)
- First race: 2020 Herr's Potato Chips 200 (Toledo)
Wins	Top tens	Poles
0	1	0

ARCA Menards Series West career
- 1 race run over 1 year
- Best finish: 40th (2020)
- First race: 2020 NAPA/Eneos125 Presented by West Coast Stock Car HOF Kern)
Wins	Top tens	Poles
0	0	0
- Statistics up to date as of April 30, 2025.

Ryan T. Repko (born October 1, 1999) is an American professional stock car racing driver. He competes full-time at Millbridge Speedway in the Micro Sprint division driving the No. 71 Hyper Racing Chassis for Ryan Repko Racing. He has previously competed in the NASCAR Xfinity Series, the ARCA Menards Series, the ARCA Menards Series East, and the ARCA Menards Series West.

== Racing career ==
Starting in 2015, Repko drove late models at Southern tracks like Motor Mile Speedway, Hickory Speedway and South Boston Speedway, earning Rookie of the Year honors at Motor Mile. The following year, he stepped up to CARS Tour competition. Repko continued a partial CARS slate in the following years, earning his first pole and top-five in 2017.

To start his national touring series career, Repko and Mason Mitchell Motorsports teamed up for his ARCA Racing Series debut at Madison International Speedway in 2017, which resulted in an eighth-place finish. The pair reunited in 2018, with Repko again driving the No. 78, this time at Fairgrounds Speedway. He capped off 2018 with a win in the Whelen All-American Series at Hickory at the Bobby Isaac Memorial in September.

While competing with the CARS Tour in 2019, Repko honored victims of the 2019 University of North Carolina at Charlotte shooting with a special paint scheme. On June 6, 2019, JD Motorsports announced that Repko would make his NASCAR Xfinity Series debut with the team in the CircuitCity.com 250 at Iowa Speedway later that month. Repko was announced to drive the 01. He returned to the Xfinity Series for the tour's second stop at Iowa in July, and in early August won the CARS Late Model Stock Tour Throwback 276 at Hickory Motor Speedway. Repko won in a Dave Marcis-inspired paint scheme, and met Marcis in victory lane after the event.

On December 20, 2019, it was announced that Repko would be returning to the ARCA Menards Series in 2020, running five races in the No. 20 for Venturini Motorsports in 2020, sharing the ride with Chandler Smith. His first race in the car was at the season opener at Daytona. Repko would also make his debut in the ARCA Menards Series East that year at Toledo, also in the Venturini No. 20. He picked up a top ten finish despite crashing out of the race.

== Personal life ==
Repko attended North Lincoln High School in Lincolnton, North Carolina.

== Motorsports career results ==
=== NASCAR ===
(key) (Bold – Pole position awarded by qualifying time. Italics – Pole position earned by points standings or practice time. * – Most laps led.)

==== Xfinity Series ====
NASCAR Xfinity Series results
Year	Team	No.	Make	1	2	3	4	5	6	7	8	9	10	11	12	13	14	15	16	17	18	19	20	21	22	23	24	25	26	27	28	29	30	31	32	33	NXSC	Pts	Ref
2019	JD Motorsports	01	Chevy	DAY	ATL	LVS	PHO	CAL	TEX	BRI	RCH	TAL	DOV	CLT	POC	MCH	IOW; 22	CHI	DAY	KEN	NHA	IOW; 25	GLN	MOH	BRI	ROA	DAR	IND	LVS	RCH; 19	CLT	DOV	KAN	TEX	PHO	HOM	50th	45	

=== ARCA Menards Series ===
(key) (Bold – Pole position awarded by qualifying time. Italics – Pole position earned by points standings or practice time. * – Most laps led.)

ARCA Menards Series results
Year	Team	No.	Make	1	2	3	4	5	6	7	8	9	10	11	12	13	14	15	16	17	18	19	20	AMSC	Pts	Ref
2017	Mason Mitchell Motorsports	78	Chevy	DAY	NSH	SLM	TAL	TOL	ELK	POC	MCH	MAD; 8	IOW	IRP	POC	WIN	ISF	ROA	DSF	SLM	CHI	KEN	KAN	82nd	190	
2018	Mason Mitchell Motorsports	78	Chevy	DAY	NSH; 12	SLM	TAL	TOL	CLT	POC	MCH	MAD	GTW	CHI	IOW	ELK	POC	ISF	BLN	DSF	SLM	IRP	KAN	86th	170	
2020	Venturini Motorsports	20	Toyota	DAY; 22	PHO	TAL; 2	POC	IRP	KEN; 6	IOW	KAN; 2	TOL	TOL	MCH; 7	DAY	GTW	I44	TOL	BRI	WIN	MEM	ISF	KAN	23rd	181	

==== ARCA Menards Series East ====
ARCA Menards Series East results
Year	Team	No.	Make	1	2	3	4	5	6	AMSEC	Pts	Ref
2020	Venturini Motorsports	20	Toyota	NSM	TOL; 9	DOV	TOL	BRI	FIF	33rd	35	

==== ARCA Menards Series West ====
ARCA Menards Series West results
Year	Team	No.	Make	1	2	3	4	5	6	7	8	9	10	11	AMSWC	Pts	Ref
2020	Venturini Motorsports	20	Toyota	LVS	MMP	MMP	IRW	EVG	DCS	CNS	LVS	AAS	KCR; 16	PHO	40th	28	

=== CARS Late Model Stock Car Tour ===
(key) (Bold – Pole position awarded by qualifying time. Italics – Pole position earned by points standings or practice time. * – Most laps led. ** – All laps led.)

CARS Late Model Stock Car Tour results
Year	Team	No.	Make	1	2	3	4	5	6	7	8	9	10	11	12	13	CLMSCTC	Pts	Ref
2016	Repko Racing	14	Chevy	SNM	ROU	HCY; 19	TCM	GRE	ROU	CON	MYB	HCY	SNM				54th	14	
2017	Repko Racing	14	Chevy	CON	DOM	DOM	HCY	HCY	BRI	**AND**; 6	ROU	TCM			CON; 10		17th	133	
2017	Repko Racing	14	Ford										ROU; 7	HCY; 5		SBO; 6	17th	133	
2018	Repko Racing	14	Ford	TCM; 4	MYB; 16	ROU	HCY; 24	BRI	ACE; 23	CCS	KPT	HCY	WKS	ROU	SBO		21st	65	
2019	Repko Racing	14	Toyota	SNM	HCY	ROU	ACE	MMS; 15	LGY; 23	DOM	CCS						27th	62	
2019	Repko Racing	71	Toyota									HCY; 1	ROU	SBO			27th	62	

^{*} Season still in progress
