= Zinsser SmartCoat 200 =

Zinsser SmartCoat 200 may refer to:

- Zinsser SmartCoat 200 (Berlin)
- Zinsser SmartCoat 200 (Lebanon)
