= 2020 ARCA Menards Series =

68th season of the ARCA Racing Series

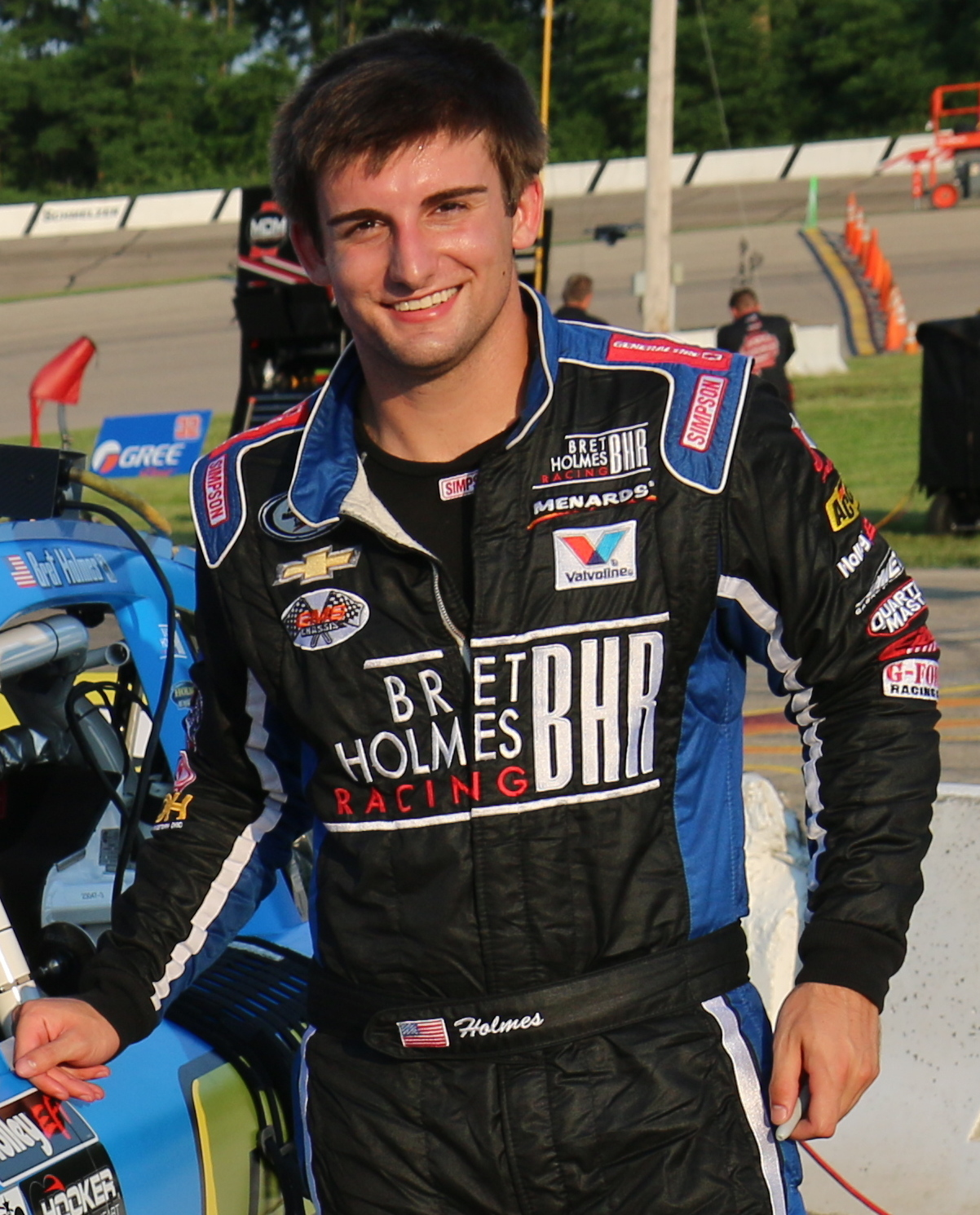
Bret Holmes, the 2020 ARCA Menards Series champion

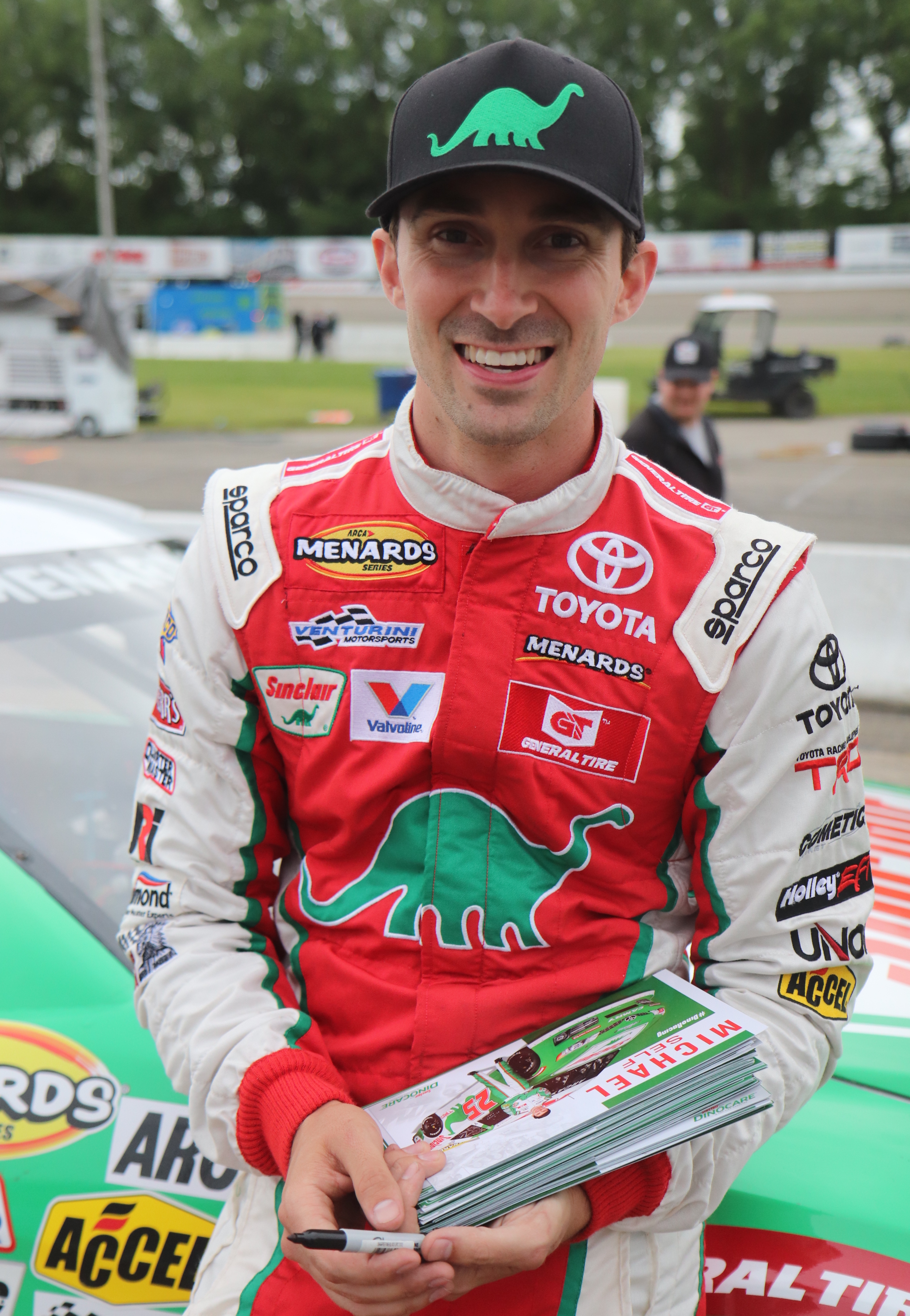
Michael Self finished second behind Holmes in the championship by 12 points.

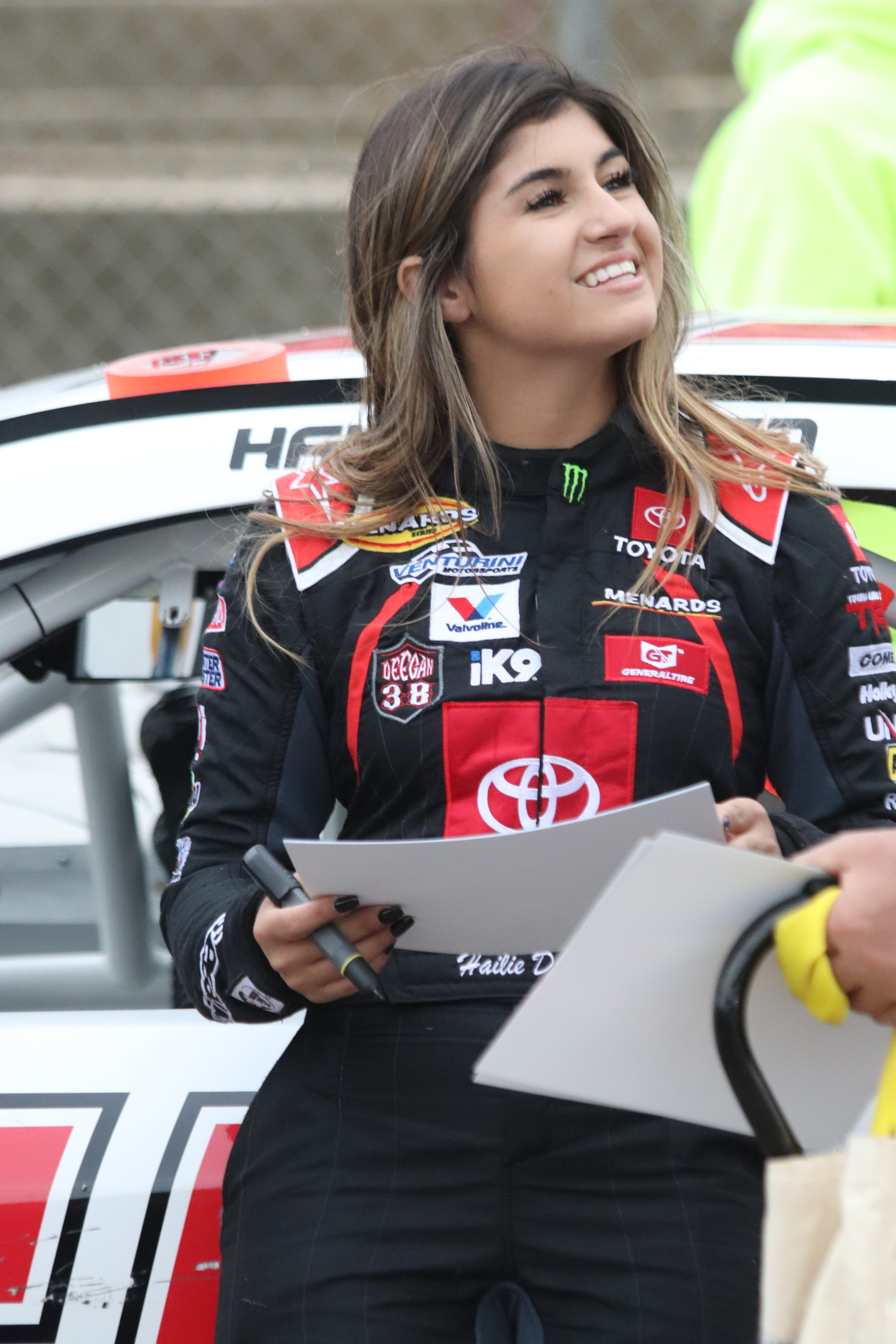
Hailie Deegan finished third in the championship.

The 2020 ARCA Menards Series season was the 68th season of the ARCA Menards Series. It began on February 8 with the Lucas Oil 200 at Daytona International Speedway and ended on October 16 with the Speediatrics 150 at Kansas Speedway. 2020 was the first season that the series was sanctioned by NASCAR.

Bret Holmes won the drivers championship, his first ARCA title.

When the season was put on hold due to the COVID-19 pandemic, drivers from all NASCAR series, including a few ARCA drivers, participated in the inaugural eNASCAR iRacing Pro Invitational Series during that time.

== Teams and drivers ==
=== Complete schedule ===
Manufacturer	Team	No.	Driver	Crew chief
Ford	DGR-Crosley	4	Hailie Deegan (R)	Seth Smith
Ford	DGR-Crosley	17	Tanner Gray 6	Blake Bainbridge
Ford	DGR-Crosley	17	Taylor Gray 12	Blake Bainbridge
Ford	DGR-Crosley	17	Anthony Alfredo 1	Blake Bainbridge
Ford	DGR-Crosley	17	Dylan Lupton 1	Marcus Richmond
Toyota	Joe Gibbs Racing	18	Riley Herbst 4	Mark McFarland
Toyota	Joe Gibbs Racing	18	Ty Gibbs 16	Mark McFarland
Toyota	Venturini Motorsports	15	Drew Dollar (R)	Shannon Rursch
Toyota	Venturini Motorsports	20	Ryan Repko 5	Billy Venturini
Toyota	Venturini Motorsports	20	Chandler Smith 13	Billy Venturini
Toyota	Venturini Motorsports	20	Jesse Love 1	Billy Venturini
Toyota	Venturini Motorsports	20	Corey Heim 1	Billy Venturini
Toyota	Venturini Motorsports	25	Michael Self	Kevin Reed
Toyota 10 Ford 5 Chevrolet 5	Venturini Motorsports	10	Corey Heim 1	Kevin Reed Jr.
Toyota 10 Ford 5 Chevrolet 5	Fast Track Racing	10	Ryan Huff 7	Dick Doheny 1 Mike Sroufe 3 Kevin Cram 7 Trey Galgon 3 Tim Monroe 5
Toyota 10 Ford 5 Chevrolet 5	Fast Track Racing	10	Mike Basham 6	Dick Doheny 1 Mike Sroufe 3 Kevin Cram 7 Trey Galgon 3 Tim Monroe 5
Toyota 10 Ford 5 Chevrolet 5	Fast Track Racing	10	Morgen Baird 1	Dick Doheny 1 Mike Sroufe 3 Kevin Cram 7 Trey Galgon 3 Tim Monroe 5
Toyota 10 Ford 5 Chevrolet 5	Fast Track Racing	10	Owen Smith 2	Dick Doheny 1 Mike Sroufe 3 Kevin Cram 7 Trey Galgon 3 Tim Monroe 5
Toyota 10 Ford 5 Chevrolet 5	Fast Track Racing	10	Tim Monroe 1	Dick Doheny 1 Mike Sroufe 3 Kevin Cram 7 Trey Galgon 3 Tim Monroe 5
Toyota 10 Ford 5 Chevrolet 5	Fast Track Racing	10	Rick Clifton 1	Dick Doheny 1 Mike Sroufe 3 Kevin Cram 7 Trey Galgon 3 Tim Monroe 5
Toyota 8 Ford 6 Chevrolet 6	Fast Track Racing	11	Chuck Hiers 1	David Ifft
Toyota 8 Ford 6 Chevrolet 6	Fast Track Racing	11	Dawson Cram 1	Clinton Cram
Toyota 8 Ford 6 Chevrolet 6	Fast Track Racing	11	Willie Mullins 2 (Note: Entries were fielded in a collaboration with Mullins Racing.)	Dick Doheny 3 Trey Galgon 6 Tony Furr 1 Mike Sroufe 3 Tim Monroe 4
Toyota 8 Ford 6 Chevrolet 6	Fast Track Racing	11	Clay Greenfield 1	Dick Doheny 3 Trey Galgon 6 Tony Furr 1 Mike Sroufe 3 Tim Monroe 4
Toyota 8 Ford 6 Chevrolet 6	Fast Track Racing	11	Mike Basham 4	Dick Doheny 3 Trey Galgon 6 Tony Furr 1 Mike Sroufe 3 Tim Monroe 4
Toyota 8 Ford 6 Chevrolet 6	Fast Track Racing	11	Dick Doheny 1	Dick Doheny 3 Trey Galgon 6 Tony Furr 1 Mike Sroufe 3 Tim Monroe 4
Toyota 8 Ford 6 Chevrolet 6	Fast Track Racing	11	Tyler Hill 1	Dick Doheny 3 Trey Galgon 6 Tony Furr 1 Mike Sroufe 3 Tim Monroe 4
Toyota 8 Ford 6 Chevrolet 6	Fast Track Racing	11	Owen Smith 5	Dick Doheny 3 Trey Galgon 6 Tony Furr 1 Mike Sroufe 3 Tim Monroe 4
Toyota 8 Ford 6 Chevrolet 6	Fast Track Racing	11	Tim Monroe 2	Dick Doheny 3 Trey Galgon 6 Tony Furr 1 Mike Sroufe 3 Tim Monroe 4
Toyota 8 Ford 6 Chevrolet 6	Fast Track Racing	11	Rick Clifton 1	Dick Doheny 3 Trey Galgon 6 Tony Furr 1 Mike Sroufe 3 Tim Monroe 4
Toyota 8 Ford 6 Chevrolet 6	Fast Track Racing	11	Richard Garvie 1	Dick Doheny 3 Trey Galgon 6 Tony Furr 1 Mike Sroufe 3 Tim Monroe 4
Chevrolet 10 Toyota 10	Fast Track Racing	12	Jason White 1	Mike Sroufe 12; Ryan London 1 Trey Galgon 2 Ryan Forsythe 1
Chevrolet 10 Toyota 10	Fast Track Racing	12	Tom Berte 1	Mike Sroufe 12; Ryan London 1 Trey Galgon 2 Ryan Forsythe 1
Chevrolet 10 Toyota 10	Fast Track Racing	12	Ed Pompa 2	Mike Sroufe 12; Ryan London 1 Trey Galgon 2 Ryan Forsythe 1
Chevrolet 10 Toyota 10	Fast Track Racing	12	Dick Doheny 2	Mike Sroufe 12; Ryan London 1 Trey Galgon 2 Ryan Forsythe 1
Chevrolet 10 Toyota 10	Fast Track Racing	12	Rick Clifton 3	Mike Sroufe 12; Ryan London 1 Trey Galgon 2 Ryan Forsythe 1
Chevrolet 10 Toyota 10	Fast Track Racing	12	Armani Williams 1	Mike Sroufe 12; Ryan London 1 Trey Galgon 2 Ryan Forsythe 1
Chevrolet 10 Toyota 10	Fast Track Racing	12	Nick Igdalsky 1	Mike Sroufe 12; Ryan London 1 Trey Galgon 2 Ryan Forsythe 1
Chevrolet 10 Toyota 10	Fast Track Racing	12	Max Calles 1	Mike Sroufe 12; Ryan London 1 Trey Galgon 2 Ryan Forsythe 1
Chevrolet 10 Toyota 10	Fast Track Racing	12	Mike Basham 2	Mike Sroufe 12; Ryan London 1 Trey Galgon 2 Ryan Forsythe 1
Chevrolet 10 Toyota 10	Fast Track Racing	12	Owen Smith 2	Mike Sroufe 12; Ryan London 1 Trey Galgon 2 Ryan Forsythe 1
Chevrolet 10 Toyota 10	Fast Track Racing	12	D. L. Wilson 1	Mike Sroufe 12; Ryan London 1 Trey Galgon 2 Ryan Forsythe 1
Chevrolet 10 Toyota 10	Chad Bryant Racing	12	Kris Wright 2 (Note: Entries were fielded in a collaboration with GMS Racing.)	Donnie Richeson
Chevrolet 10 Toyota 10	Venturini Motorsports	12	Corey Heim 1	Dave Leiner Jr.
Chevrolet 18 Toyota 1 Ford 1	Bret Holmes Racing	23	Bret Holmes	Shane Huffman
Toyota 17 Chevrolet 3	Wayne Peterson Racing	06	Tim Richmond 14	Brad Frye 10; Wayne Peterson 2 Michael Peterson 5
Toyota 17 Chevrolet 3	Wayne Peterson Racing	06	Don Thompson 2	Brad Frye 10; Wayne Peterson 2 Michael Peterson 5
Toyota 17 Chevrolet 3	Wayne Peterson Racing	06	Con Nicolopoulos 4	Brad Frye 10; Wayne Peterson 2 Michael Peterson 5

=== Limited schedule ===
Manufacturer	Team	No.	Driver	Crew chief	Rounds
Chevrolet	Allgaier Motorsports	16	Kelly Kovski	Jon Hanson	1
Chevrolet	Brad Smith Motorsports	48	Brad Smith	Leo Kryger 4 Terry Strange 1 Jeff Smith 7 Arlis Basham 1 Carlos Leon 2 Carl Brown 2	19
Chevrolet	Brother-In-Law Racing	57	Bryan Dauzat	Bob Rahilly	1
Chevrolet	Charles Buchanan Racing	87	Chuck Buchanan Jr.	Craig Wood	1
Chevrolet	Cook-Finley Racing	41	Kyle Sieg (Note: Entries was fielded in a collaboration with RSS Racing.)	Sean Samuels 1 Amber Slagle 1	2
Chevrolet	CR7 Motorsports	97	Jason Kitzmiller	Doug George 6 Todd Myers 1	7
Chevrolet	Empire Racing	8	Sean Corr	Derick Hartnagel 1 Mike Cheek 2	2
Chevrolet	Empire Racing	82	Sean Corr	Derick Hartnagel 1 Mike Cheek 2	1
Chevrolet	John Ferrier Racing (Note: It was a John Ferrier Racing entry using Fast Track Racing's owner points.)	01	John Ferrier	Jeff McClure	1
Chevrolet	GMS Racing	21	Sam Mayer	Mardy Lindley	13
Chevrolet	GMS Racing	21	Kris Wright	Mardy Lindley	1
Chevrolet	Hendren Motorsports	24	Ryan Unzicker	Bill Hendren	1
Chevrolet	KBR Development	28	David Gravel	Frank Kimmel	1
Chevrolet	Max Force Racing	9	Thomas Praytor	Tevin Bair	1
Chevrolet	Our Motorsports	02	Andy Seuss	John Merlo	1
Chevrolet	Our Motorsports	09	Benny Chastain	Bob Schacht	1
Chevrolet	Reeves Racing	88	Scott Reeves	Brian Finney	1
Chevrolet	Robert Pawlowski Racing	11	Robert Pawlowski	Aaron Brown	1
Chevrolet	Spraker Racing Enterprises	63	Dave Mader III	Jeff Spraker	2
Chevrolet	Steve McGowan Motorsports	17	Zane Smith	Bruce Cook	1
Chevrolet	Steve McGowan Motorsports	17	Will Rodgers	Bruce Cook	1
Chevrolet	Visconti Motorsports	74	Giovanni Bromante	Steven Keller	1
Chevrolet	Visconti Motorsports	74	Austin Green	Steven Keller	1
Chevrolet	Visconti Motorsports	74	Ayrton Ori	Steven Keller	1
Chevrolet	Wayne Peterson Racing	0	Con Nicolopoulos	Michael Peterson	3
Chevrolet	Wayne Peterson Racing	0	Wayne Peterson	Michael Peterson	5
Chevrolet	Win-Tron Racing	32	Gus Dean	Jamie Jones	4
Chevrolet	Win-Tron Racing	32	Howie DiSavino III	Jamie Jones	3
Chevrolet	Chad Bryant Racing	22	Kris Wright	Paul Andrews	3
Ford	Chad Bryant Racing	22	Connor Hall	Paul Andrews	1
Ford	Chad Bryant Racing	22	Christian McGhee	Paul Andrews	1
Ford	Chad Bryant Racing	22	Brandon Lynn	Paul Andrews	1
Ford	Chad Bryant Racing	22	Derek Griffith	Paul Andrews	8
Ford	Chad Bryant Racing	22	Kody Swanson	Paul Andrews	1
Ford	Chad Bryant Racing	22	Parker Chase	Paul Andrews	1
Ford	Chad Bryant Racing	77	Jacob Heafner	Chad Bryant	1
Ford	Fast Track Racing (Note: It was a Fast Track Racing entry using Chad Bryant Racing's owner points.)	77	Mike Basham	Mike Sroufe	1
Ford	DGR-Crosley	46	Thad Moffitt	Derek Smith	13
Ford	Ken Schrader Racing with Fury Race Cars	52	Natalie Decker	Tony Eury Jr.	1
Ford	Mullins Racing	3	Willie Mullins	Tony Furr	1
Ford	Rette Jones Racing	30	Dominique Van Wieringen	Logan Yiengst	1
Toyota	Bill McAnally Racing	12	Lawless Alan	Gary Collins	1
Toyota	Bill McAnally Racing	16	Gio Scelzi	John Camilleri	3
Toyota	Bill McAnally Racing	19	Jesse Love	Kyle Wolosek 2 Jason Dickerson 1	3
Toyota	Bill McAnally Racing	99	Gracie Trotter	Roger Bracken	3
Toyota	Hattori Racing Enterprises	1	Max McLaughlin	Dave McCarty	5
Toyota	J. J. Pack Racing	61	J. J. Pack	Dan Givins	1
Toyota	Performance P-1 Motorsports	77	Takuma Koga	Ron Norman	1
Toyota	Rev Racing	4	Chase Cabre	Glenn Parker	4
Toyota	Rev Racing	6	Nick Sanchez	Steve Plattenberger	4
Toyota	TC Motorsports	91	Justin Carroll	Jim Long	3
Toyota	Troy Williams Racing	53	Max Gutiérrez	Troy Williams	1
Toyota	Venturini Motorsports	25	Mason Diaz	Dave Leiner Jr.	2
Ford 3 Toyota 2 Chevrolet 1	CCM Racing	7	Eric Caudell	Jeremy Petty	6
Chevrolet 1 Toyota 2	Cook-Finley Racing	42	Kyle Sieg	Sean Samuels	1
Chevrolet 1 Toyota 2	Cook-Finley Racing	42	Parker Retzlaff	Sean Samuels	2
Ford 2 Toyota 1 Chevrolet 2	Fast Track Racing	01	Armani Williams	Dick Doheny	1
Ford 2 Toyota 1 Chevrolet 2	Fast Track Racing	01	Tommy Vigh Jr.	Trey Galgon	2
Ford 2 Toyota 1 Chevrolet 2	Fast Track Racing	01	Mike Basham	Trey Galgon	1
Ford 2 Toyota 1 Chevrolet 2	Fast Track Racing	01	Alex Clubb	Brian Clubb	1
Ford 5 Toyota 3 Chevrolet 3	Kimmel Racing	69	Scott Melton	Bill Kimmel	7
Ford 5 Toyota 3 Chevrolet 3	Kimmel Racing	69	Brian Finney (Note: Entry was fielded in a collaboration with Finney Racing Enterprises.)	Bill Kimmel	1
Ford 5 Toyota 3 Chevrolet 3	Kimmel Racing	69	Eric Caudell (Note: Entry was fielded in a collaboration with CCM Racing.)	Bill Kimmel	1
Ford 5 Toyota 3 Chevrolet 3	Kimmel Racing	69	Will Kimmel	Bill Kimmel	2
Toyota 2 Ford 1	Russ Lane Racing (Note: Entries were fielded in a collaboration with Empire Racing and using Empire Racing's owner points.)	8	Russ Lane	Derick Hartnagel 1 Mike Cheek 2	3

=== Changes ===
==== Teams ====
- On November 20, 2019, it was announced that longtime East Series team Rev Racing would run in the ARCA Series for the first time, fielding two cars during Sioux Chief Showdown races.
- On December 17, 2019, DGR-Crosley announced an expansion to a full-time ARCA effort, a step up from previous part-time schedules. They had previously only run part-time in the series with their No. 54 in both 2018 and 2019 as well as the No. 4 in 2019.
- On May 9, 2020, KBR Development announced that the team closed. The team fielded an entry for David Gravel in one of two 2020 races that occurred before the team's closure.

==== Drivers ====
- On November 14, 2019, it was announced that 2019 series champion Christian Eckes would move up to the Truck Series full-time for Kyle Busch Motorsports starting in 2020.
- On November 20, 2019, it was announced that Chase Cabre and Nick Sanchez would drive two cars for Rev Racing in the Sioux Chief Showdown races.
- On December 10, 2019, it was announced that 2019 part-time driver Ty Majeski would compete full-time in the NASCAR Gander RV & Outdoors Truck Series in 2020.
- On December 17, 2019, Hailie Deegan announced a full-season Rookie of the Year campaign with DGR-Crosley in 2020, moving over from a part-time schedule with Venturini Motorsports in 2019.
- On December 18, 2019, it was announced that Drew Dollar would run a full schedule for Venturini, moving over from a part-time schedule with DGR-Crosley in 2019.
- On December 18, 2019, it was announced that Taylor Gray would make his debut and run all races he was eligible for after his 15th birthday, running with DGR-Crosley.
- On December 20, 2019, it was announced that Ryan Repko would drive the No. 20 for Venturini Motorsports in five races, sharing the car with Chandler Smith.
- On December 23, 2019, it was announced that Tim Richmond, who drove most of the season for Wayne Peterson Racing in 2019, would run full-time for the team in 2020. Richmond later scaled back to a part-time schedule for the team.
- On January 2, 2020, Bobby Gerhart announced his exit as a driver from the series following a heart attack.
- On January 5, 2020, Travis Braden revealed that he would not run full-time in the series in 2020 after driving the No. 27 for RFMS Racing for the last two years, instead focusing on late model racing.
- Thad Moffitt switched teams for his part-time schedule, moving from Empire Racing in 2019 to DGR-Crosley in 2020.
- On January 10, 2020, it was announced that World of Outlaws driver David Gravel would run some ARCA races, including Daytona, in the No. 28 for KBR Development in addition to competing in the Truck Series part-time for GMS Racing this season.
- On January 16, 2020, it was announced that Corey Heim signed with Venturini Motorsports for a limited schedule in 2020; Heim raced with Chad Bryant Racing in 2019.
- On January 18, 2020, Scott Melton announced he was scaling back his schedule for 2020 compared to 2019.

==== Crew chiefs ====
- On December 18, 2019, it was announced that Shannon Rursch would be the crew chief of the No. 15 Venturini team, replacing Kevin Reed. In 2019, Rursch crew chiefed Venturini's No. 25 car. On January 23, 2020, it was announced that Reed would be the crew chief of the Venturini Motorsports No. 25 car, making it a crew chief swap with Rursch.

==== Manufacturers ====
- On December 11, 2019, DGR-Crosley announced that they would be switching from Toyota to Ford beginning in 2020.

== Rule changes ==
ARCA adopted the current NASCAR points system after using the 1975-2010 NASCAR points system up until 2019. Additionally, steel-bodied cars were phased out entirely in favor of composite-bodied cars, which also saw the end of Dodge's presence in the series due to a lack of a composite body.

== Schedule ==
The complete schedule was released on October 10, 2019. That came after a soft reveal of some Sioux Chief Showdown tracks on October 2.

No.	Race title	Track	Date
1	Lucas Oil 200	Daytona International Speedway, Daytona Beach	February 8
2	General Tire 150	Phoenix Raceway, Avondale	March 6
3	General Tire 200	Talladega Superspeedway, Talladega	June 20
4	General Tire #AnywhereIsPossible 200	Pocono Raceway, Long Pond	June 26
5	Calypso Lemonade 200	Lucas Oil Raceway, Brownsburg	July 3
6	General Tire 150 (Note: The Kentucky race replaced the Charlotte race, the General Tire 150.)	Kentucky Speedway, Sparta	July 11
7	Shore Lunch 150	Iowa Speedway, Newton	July 18
8	Dawn Ultra 150 (Note: The additional Kansas race replaced the Chicagoland race, the Dawn 150.)	Kansas Speedway, Kansas City	July 24
9	Menards.com 200 presented by XPxE (Note: The two races at Toledo replaced the races at Mid-Ohio and Elko, the Mid-Ohio 50 and the Elko 250, respectively.)	Toledo Speedway, Toledo	July 31
10	Menards 200 presented by Crosley Brands	Toledo Speedway, Toledo	August 1–2 (Note: The Menards 200 presented by Crosley Brands was stopped at Lap 6 on Saturday due to rain. The race was completed the following day, although it was then rain-shortened by 73 laps because more rain came.)
11	VizCom 200	Michigan International Speedway, Brooklyn	August 9
12	General Tire 100 (Note: The Daytona road course race replaced the Watkins Glen race, the Great Outdoors RV Superstore 100.)	Daytona International Speedway (Road Course), Daytona Beach	August 14
13	Dutch Boy 150	World Wide Technology Raceway, Madison	August 29
14	Zinsser SmartCoat 200 (Note: The Lebanon I-44 race replaced the Madison event.)	Lebanon I-44 Speedway, Lebanon	September 5
15	Royal Truck & Trailer 200	Toledo Speedway, Toledo	September 12
16	Bush's Beans 200	Bristol Motor Speedway, Bristol	September 17
17	Toyota 200 presented by Crosley Brands (Note: The Winchester race replaced the DuQuoin race, the Southern Illinois 100.)	Winchester Speedway, Winchester	September 19
18	Sioux Chief PowerPEX 200	Memphis International Raceway, Millington	September 26
19	Illinois Truck & Equipment Allen Crowe 100	Illinois State Fairgrounds Racetrack, Springfield	October 4
20	Speediatrics 150	Kansas Speedway, Kansas City	October 16

- Races highlighted in gold are combination events with the ARCA Menards Series East.

The season was paused from March to June due to the COVID-19 pandemic. A number of races were cancelled, rescheduled, or shifted to other tracks as a result of the pandemic.

=== Broadcasting ===
Fox and MAVTV continued to share broadcasting rights to the schedule, consistent with previous years.

== Results and standings ==
=== Races ===
No.	Race	Pole Position	Most laps led	Winning driver	Manufacturer	No.	Winning team
1	Lucas Oil 200	Michael Self	Michael Self	Michael Self	Toyota	25	Venturini Motorsports
2	General Tire 150	Ty Gibbs	Ty Gibbs	Chandler Smith	Toyota	20	Venturini Motorsports
3	General Tire 200	Ryan Repko	Drew Dollar	Drew Dollar	Toyota	15	Venturini Motorsports
4	General Tire #AnywhereIsPossible 200	Michael Self	Ty Gibbs	Ty Gibbs	Toyota	18	Joe Gibbs Racing
5	Calypso Lemonade 200	Chandler Smith	Chandler Smith	Chandler Smith	Toyota	20	Venturini Motorsports
6	General Tire 150	Michael Self	Ty Gibbs	Ty Gibbs	Toyota	18	Joe Gibbs Racing
7	Shore Lunch 150	Chandler Smith	Ty Gibbs	Ty Gibbs	Toyota	18	Joe Gibbs Racing
8	Dawn 150	Riley Herbst	Bret Holmes	Bret Holmes	Chevrolet	23	Bret Holmes Racing
9	Menards.com 200 presented by XPxE	Chandler Smith	Chandler Smith	Sam Mayer	Chevrolet	21	GMS Racing
10	Menards 200 presented by Crosley Brands	Ty Gibbs	Ty Gibbs	Sam Mayer	Chevrolet	21	GMS Racing
11	VizCom 200	Riley Herbst	Bret Holmes	Riley Herbst	Toyota	18	Joe Gibbs Racing
12	General Tire 100	Chandler Smith	Ty Gibbs	Michael Self	Toyota	25	Venturini Motorsports
13	Dutch Boy 150	Michael Self	Ty Gibbs	Ty Gibbs	Toyota	18	Joe Gibbs Racing
14	Zinsser SmartCoat 200	Bret Holmes	Hailie Deegan	Sam Mayer	Chevrolet	21	GMS Racing
15	Royal Truck & Trailer 200	Sam Mayer	Sam Mayer	Sam Mayer	Chevrolet	21	GMS Racing
16	Bush's Beans 200	Ty Gibbs	Sam Mayer	Sam Mayer	Chevrolet	21	GMS Racing
17	Toyota 200 presented by Crosley Brands	Ty Gibbs	Ty Gibbs	Ty Gibbs	Toyota	18	Joe Gibbs Racing
18	Sioux Chief PowerPEX 200	Ty Gibbs	Bret Holmes	Ty Gibbs	Toyota	18	Joe Gibbs Racing
19	Illinois Truck & Equipment Allen Crowe 100	Ryan Unzicker	Ryan Unzicker	Ryan Unzicker	Chevrolet	24	Hendren Motorsports
20	Speediatrics 150	Ty Gibbs	Corey Heim	Corey Heim	Toyota	10	Venturini Motorsports

=== Drivers' championship ===
Note: The pole winner also receives one bonus point, similar to the previous ARCA points system used until 2019 and unlike NASCAR.

(key) Bold – Pole position awarded by time. Italics – Pole position set by final practice results or rainout. * – Most laps led.

Pos	Driver	DAY	PHO	TAL	POC	IRP	KEN	IOW	KAN	TOL	TOL	MCH	DAY	GTW	I44	TOL	BRI	WIN	MEM	ISF	KAN	Points
1	Bret Holmes	9	15	3	4	7	2	3	1*	4	3	2*	8	6	**2**	4	8	3	3*	3	2	1003
2	Michael Self	**1***	2	5	5	8	3	6	6	5	4	3	1	15	6	7	5	2	6	9	5	991
3	Hailie Deegan **(R)**	2	7	7	7	3	14	18	9	8	6	6	6	9	5*	6	6	12	7	2	6	937
4	Drew Dollar **(R)**	3	14	1*	6	14	5	17	7	6	9	4	12	7	9	15	18	6	8	7	8	910
5	Ty Gibbs		**3***		1*	15	1*	1*		2	**10***		2*	1*	4	3	2	**1***	**1**	10	14	724
6	Brad Smith	31	Wth	20	13	17	12	19	16	13	14	12	19	19	13	17	25	9	15	13	15	674
7	Sam Mayer		20		3	2	4	2		1	1		3^{†}	3	1	**1***	1*		2			553
8	Mike Basham					19		20	17	14	15	17	15	20	10	12	24	7	12	6	12	540
9	Thad Moffitt	5	18	6	20	5	15	10	10	12	8	9	11						4			539
10	Chandler Smith		1		2	**1***		4		**11***	2		9	2	8	2	23		5		13	506
11	Taylor Gray					4		5		3	11		4	8	3	5	7	5	9	4		460
12	Tim Richmond	18	23	17		20		13		9	12	11		16	11	13			13	11	11	397
13	Derek Griffith				8	12	7		8	7	5						9				3	293
14	Ryan Huff	21	24	12	9	16	8		13													255
15	Owen Smith									16	16			21	12	18	22	13		15	16	247
16	Scott Melton	10		11	10		17	15				13									9	223
17	Eric Caudell	17		14					12									8	14	16	10	217
18	Jason Kitzmiller	32		8	14		10		11			8					13					212
19	Tanner Gray	16	4	13	15		9		5													203
20	Con Nicolopoulos	14		21					15			16	18				16	10				198
21	Max McLaughlin					6		7					7	4			3					194
22	Kris Wright											14		18	7		15		10		7	193
23	Ryan Repko	22		2			6		2			7										181
24	Riley Herbst	7		4					3			1										167
25	Rick Clifton							14		10	13					19		11				153
26	Jesse Love		16					12						5				4				139
27	Nick Sanchez		6											14		10	11					135
28	Wayne Peterson																26	14	17	DNS	17	129
29	Corey Heim								4											8	1*	123
30	Chase Cabre		8											10		16	21					121
31	Gus Dean	23		16													12		11			114
32	Sean Corr	4		9	12																	108
33	Gio Scelzi		10					11						13								98
34	Justin Carroll					13										11	10					98
35	Willie Mullins	8		18			11															95
36	Kyle Sieg					10								11			17					94
37	Gracie Trotter		22					9						12								89
38	Howie DiSavino III		21			9		16														86
39	Tim Monroe												20		14					12		86
40	Russ Lane				17				18				16									81
41	Dick Doheny					18	13	21														80
42	Mason Diaz															9	4					75
43	Ed Pompa			10	11																	67
44	Parker Retzlaff															8	19					61
45	Armani Williams		17									10										61
46	Will Kimmel												13							14		61
47	Don Thompson				18		16															54
48	Tommy Vigh Jr.			19	19																	50
49	Ryan Unzicker																			**1***		49
50	Dylan Lupton																				4	40
51	Zane Smith		5																			39
52	Anthony Alfredo											5										39
53	Will Rodgers												5									39
54	Kelly Kovski																			5		39
55	Jason White	6																				38
56	Dave Mader III	30															20					38
57	Austin Green										7											37
58	Kody Swanson							8														36
59	Lawless Alan		9																			35
60	Parker Chase												10									34
61	Thomas Praytor	11																				33
62	Dawson Cram		11																			33
63	Brian Finney					11																33
64	David Gravel	12																				32
65	Christian McGhee		12																			32
66	Chuck Buchanan Jr.	13																				31
67	Takuma Koga		13																			31
68	Tyler Hill								14													30
69	Nick Igdalsky												14									30
70	Robert Pawlowski															14						30
71	Max Gutiérrez																14					30
72	Benny Chastain	15																				29
73	Brandon Lynn			15																		29
74	Giovanni Bromante									15												29
75	Morgen Baird											15										29
76	Clay Greenfield				16																	28
77	D. L. Wilson																		16			28
78	Ayrton Ori												17									27
79	Max Calles													17								27
80	Alex Clubb																				18	26
81	Chuck Hiers	19																				25
82	Tom Berte		19																			25
83	Connor Hall	20																				24
84	J. J. Pack	24																				20
85	Dominique Van Wieringen	25																				19
86	Natalie Decker	26																				18
87	Jacob Heafner	27																				17
88	Andy Seuss	28																				16
89	John Ferrier	29																				15
90	Scott Reeves	33																				11
	Bryan Dauzat												DNS									3
	Richard Garvie																		DNS			3
^{†} – Sam Mayer was relieved by Colin Braun part of the way through the General Tire 100, but still received points for starting the race.

== See also ==
- 2020 NASCAR Cup Series
- 2020 NASCAR Xfinity Series
- 2020 NASCAR Gander RV & Outdoors Truck Series
- 2020 ARCA Menards Series East
- 2020 ARCA Menards Series West
- 2020 NASCAR Whelen Modified Tour
- 2020 NASCAR Pinty's Series
- 2020 NASCAR Whelen Euro Series
- 2020 CARS Tour
- 2020 eNASCAR iRacing Pro Invitational Series
- 2020 EuroNASCAR Esports Series
