= Jacob Heafner =

American racing driver

- Born: December 10, 1999 (age 26); Dallas, North Carolina, U.S.

ARCA Menards Series career
- 1 race run over 1 year
- Best finish: 87th (2020)
- First race: 2020 Lucas Oil 200 (Daytona)
| Wins | Top tens | Poles |
|---|---|---|
| 0 | 0 | 0 |
- Statistics up to date as of January 31, 2025.

Jacob Heafner (born December 10, 1999) is an American professional stock car racing driver who has competed in the ARCA Menards Series and the CARS Late Model Stock Tour.

Heafner has also previously competed in series such as the Virginia Late Model Triple Crown Series, the Paramount Kia Big 10 Challenge, the INEX Summer Shootout, and the NASCAR Advance Auto Parts Weekly Series, and is a former track champion at Hickory Motor Speedway.

== Motorsports results ==
=== ARCA Menards Series ===
(key) (Bold – Pole position awarded by qualifying time. Italics – Pole position earned by points standings or practice time. * – Most laps led.)

ARCA Menards Series results
| Year | Team | No. | Make | 1 | 2 | 3 | 4 | 5 | 6 | 7 | 8 | 9 | 10 | 11 | 12 | 13 | 14 | 15 | 16 | 17 | 18 | 19 | 20 | AMSC | Pts | Ref |
|---|---|---|---|---|---|---|---|---|---|---|---|---|---|---|---|---|---|---|---|---|---|---|---|---|---|---|
| 2020 | Chad Bryant Racing | 77 | Ford | DAY; 27 | PHO | TAL | POC | IRP | KEN | IOW | KAN | TOL | TOL | MCH | DAY | GTW | L44 | TOL | BRI | WIN | MEM | ISF | KAN | 87th | 17 | |

=== CARS Late Model Stock Car Tour ===
(key) (Bold – Pole position awarded by qualifying time. Italics – Pole position earned by points standings or practice time. * – Most laps led. ** – All laps led.)

CARS Late Model Stock Car Tour results
| Year | Team | No. | Make | 1 | 2 | 3 | 4 | 5 | 6 | 7 | 8 | 9 | 10 | 11 | 12 | 13 | 14 | 15 | 16 | 17 | CLMSCTC | Pts | Ref |
|---|---|---|---|---|---|---|---|---|---|---|---|---|---|---|---|---|---|---|---|---|---|---|---|
| 2018 | Carroll Speedshop | 95 | Ford | TCM; DNQ | MYB; 19 | ROU | HCY; 18 | BRI | ACE | CCS | KPT | HCY | WKS | ROU | SBO; 23 | | | | | | 29th | 41 | |
| 2019 | Carroll Speedshop | 95 | Ford | SNM | HCY; 17 | ROU; 20 | ACE | MMS | LGY | DOM | CCS | | | | | | | | | | 31st | 48 | |
| 2019 | Bill Petroff | 19C | Chevy | | | | | | | | | HCY; 14 | ROU | SBO | | | | | | | 31st | 48 | |
| 2022 | Carroll Speedshop | 95 | Toyota | CRW; 20 | HCY; 24 | | | | | | | | | | | | | | | | 3rd | 350 | |
| 2022 | Carroll Speedshop | 95 | Chevy | | | GPS; 8 | AAS; 10 | FCS; 3 | LGY; 5 | DOM; 2 | | ACE; 13 | MMS; 8 | NWS; 11 | TCM; 6 | ACE; 5 | SBO; 6 | CRW; 7 | | | 3rd | 350 | |
| 2022 | Carroll Speedshop | 57 | Chevy | | | | | | | | HCY; 18 | | | | | | | | | | 3rd | 350 | |
| 2023 | Carroll Speedshop | 95 | Chevy | SNM; 6 | FLC; 5 | HCY; 7 | ACE; 27 | NWS; 30 | LGY; 9 | DOM; 12 | CRW; 14 | | ACE; 7 | TCM; 14 | WKS; 16 | AAS; 10 | SBO; 20 | TCM; 9 | CRW; 17 | | 8th | 317 | |
| 2023 | Carroll Speedshop | 16 | Chevy | | | | | | | | | HCY; 7 | | | | | | | | | 8th | 317 | |
| 2024 | AK Performance | 95 | Chevy | SNM; 18 | HCY; 12 | AAS; 18 | OCS; 11 | ACE; 10 | TCM; 16 | LGY; 17 | | | | NWS; 28 | ACE | WCS | FLC; 9 | SBO | TCM | NWS | 15th | 215 | |
| 2024 | AK Performance | 95 | Toyota | | | | | | | | DOM; 16 | CRW; 14 | HCY; 12 | | | | | | | | 15th | 215 | |
| 2025 | AK Performance | 98 | N/A | AAS | WCS | CDL | OCS | ACE | NWS | LGY | DOM | CRW | HCY | AND | FLC; 19 | SBO | TCM | NWS | | | 80th | 23 | |
