= Mini sprint =

Open-wheel racing vehicle

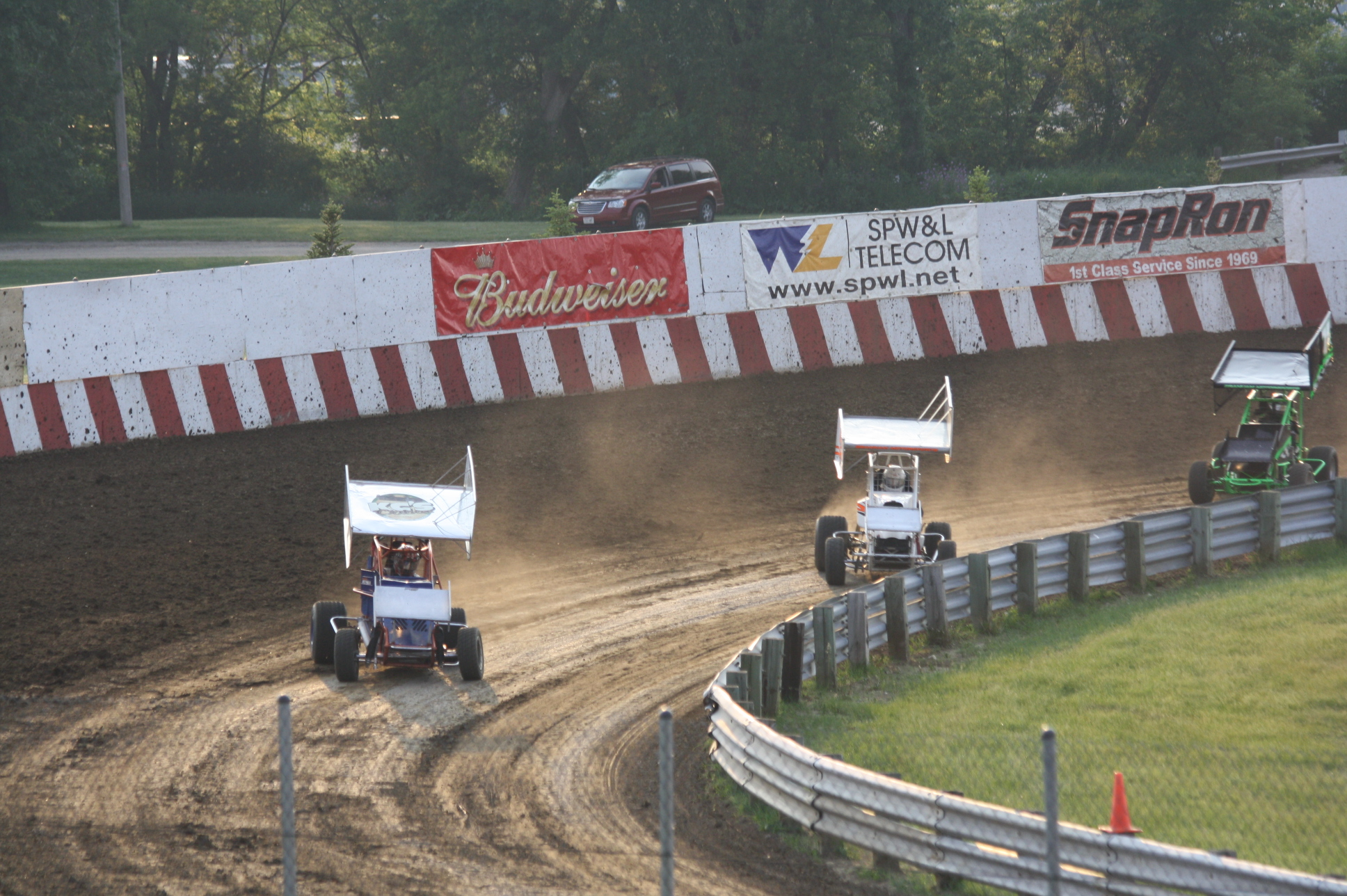
Mini sprint cars racing at Angell Park Speedway

A mini sprint is an American type of open-wheel racing vehicle. Mini sprint cars resemble the shape of a full-size sprint car and the size of a midget car. Although often used to describe several different types of motorcycle-powered open-wheel racing cars, the term mini sprint applies to cars which have an upright-style chassis (the driver sits upright in the seat as in a sprint or midget), a center-mounted 4-cylinder motorcycle engine with a displacement between 750 and 1200cc, and dimensions and appearance that are similar to today's midget. Mini sprints are chain driven and use 13-inch (33 cm) wheels and tires.

== The car ==
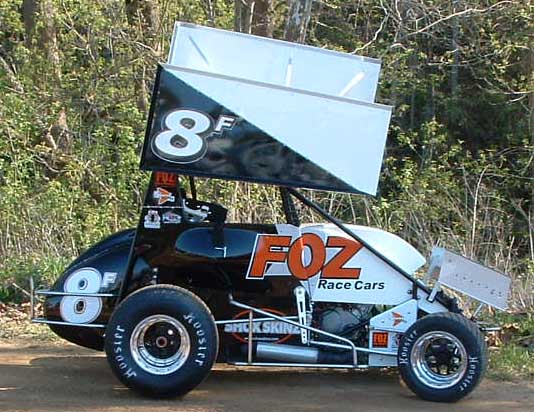
An example of a mini sprint

The mini-sprint shares overall dimensions that are similar if not identical to a full-size midget. Mini-sprints have a wheelbase that is between 66 inches (1,700 mm) and 74 inches (1,900 mm). In fact, numerous competitors are actually making use of old midget chassis. Mini-sprints are exclusively front-engined cars that have their engines located near the middle of the chassis. The maximum offset from the centerline of the chassis is 6 inches (150 mm) (this is opposed to modified midgets or super-lites that have their engine located offset to the left). Mini-sprints also share suspensions that are identical to sprints and midgets. The most popular chassis is the four bar. This is a suspension system which makes use of 4 torsion bars (2 front / 2 rear) that utilize torsion arms and shocks to regulate suspension travel. Some cars will run with a wing on top to help with downforce to get the car to stick to the track. Others will run without a wing to let the car slide for more exciting racing. Mini Sprints (also known as Micro sprints) have 600cc engines and are chain driven sprint cars. The way the driver sits is not like a midget and a 410 sprint. The drivers sit with their legs extended outright beside the firewall, which on the other side sits the engine. The major event is the Tulsa Shootout, which is the opening event at the SageNet Center held as the preliminary events for the Chili Bowl Nationals a few weeks beforehand after Boxing Day. Classes include A-class Wing, A-Class non-wing, Wing-Restricted, non-wing restricted, and Junior Sprints.

However, there is a growing number of cars that use a torsion bar rear set-up with a coil-over front set-up. This means that the rear of the car has a torsion bar system which is identical to the 4 bar set-up, while the front-end uses shocks with coil springs. Mini-sprints use a solid, live rear axle that is positioned in the chassis by a Jacobs Ladder or panhard bar. Unlike the midget or the sprint car, the final drive on a mini-sprint is a roller chain. This is one of the keys to keeping the cost of this form of racing down. A chain drive system might cost around $500, whereas a quick-change rear end like those used on sprints and midgets cost upwards of $10,000. Gearing on a mini-sprint is determined by changing either the front or rear sprocket or a combination of both. Mini-sprints make use of 13-inch wheels and tires that are identical to those found on midgets. Most mini-sprints make use of a steering box, but a few manufacturers use steering racks. Mini sprints carry their fuel in the rear of the car in tanks that vary from 5 to 19 US gallons. They have roll cages that are constructed of at least 1 1/4-inch, .095 wall Chromoly tubing. Many organizations are now requiring thicker tubing. The cars can reach upwards of 100 miles per hour which is why the tubing needs to be thicker.
