= Con Nicolopoulos =

American racing driver (born 1961)

- Born: October 17, 1961 (age 65); Columbus, Michigan, U.S.

ARCA Menards Series career
- 99 races run over 13 years
- Best finish: 11th (2016, 2017, 2018)
- First race: 2011 Menards 200 (Toledo)
- Last race: 2026 Bush's Best 200 (Bristol)
Wins	Top tens	Poles
0	1	0

ARCA Menards Series East career
- 3 races run over 3 years
- Best finish: 46th (2020)
- First race: 2020 Bush's Beans 200 (Bristol)
- Last race: 2026 Bush's Best 200 (Bristol)
Wins	Top tens	Poles
0	0	0
- Statistics up to date as of September 17, 2026.

Constatine Nicolopoulos (born October 17, 1961) is an American professional stock car racing driver. He last competed part-time in the ARCA Menards Series, driving the No. 06 for Wayne Peterson Racing.

== Racing career ==
=== ARCA Menards Series ===
Nicolopoulos would first race in 2011, with Brad Smith Motorsports after meeting Chrysler coworker Brad Smith. He would first spot for Smith, then drive a second entry for Smith at certain races. Smith's second entry was a start-and-park entry, meaning that the team would pull in early every race.

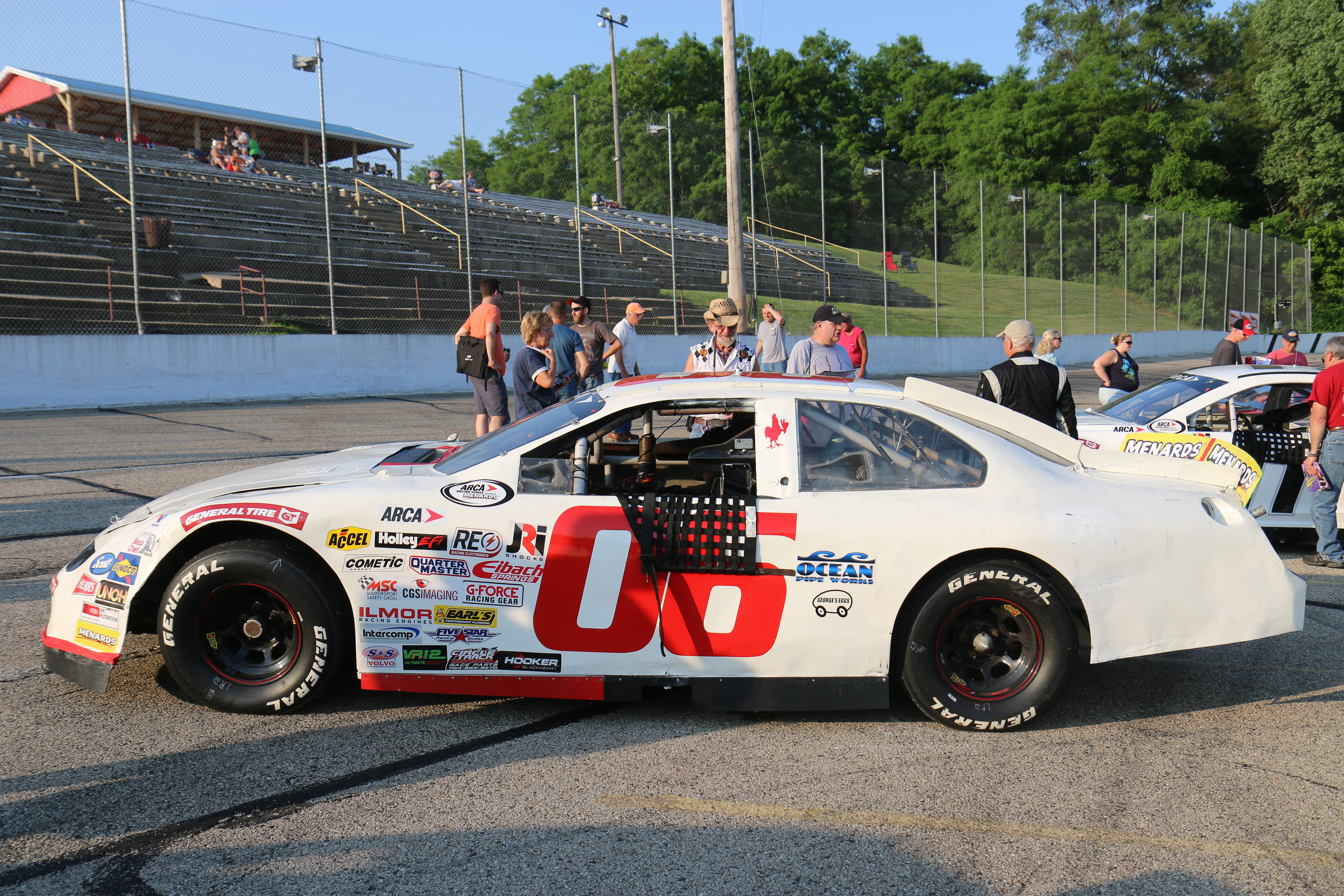
Con Nicolopoulos' car in 2018 at Madison International Speedway.

In 2014, Nicolopoulos would sign with Wayne Peterson Racing part-time, running a start-and-park entry for most of his races. Nicolopoulos would finish his first race in 2017 at Nashville Fairgrounds Speedway, finishing 26th. Since then, he has earned one top-ten at Winchester Speedway, and has finished 22 of his 95 attempts in the ARCA Menards Series.

== Personal life ==
Nicolopoulos is an engineer for Chrysler in thermal dynamics. During the COVID-19 pandemic, he also worked on developing new healthcare products.

== Motorsports career results ==
=== ARCA Menards Series ===
(key) (Bold – Pole position awarded by qualifying time. Italics – Pole position earned by points standings or practice time. * – Most laps led.)

ARCA Menards Series results
Year	Team	No.	Make	1	2	3	4	5	6	7	8	9	10	11	12	13	14	15	16	17	18	19	20	AMSC	Pts	Ref
2011	Brad Smith Motorsports	26	Ford	DAY	TAL	SLM	TOL; 31	NJM																43rd	570	
2011	Brad Smith Motorsports	94	Ford						CHI; 30	POC	MCH; 40	WIN; 30	BLN; 28	IOW	IRP	POC; 32	ISF; 30							43rd	570	
2011	Hixson Motorsports	29	Chevy															MAD; 33	DSF	SLM	KAN	TOL		43rd	570	
2014	Wayne Peterson Racing	0	Ford	DAY	MOB	SLM	TAL	TOL	NJM	POC	MCH	ELK	WIN	CHI	IRP	POC	BLN	ISF	MAD; 21	DSF	SLM; 26	KEN; 29		46th	390	
2014	Wayne Peterson Racing	00	Chevy																				KAN; 30	46th	390	
2015	Wayne Peterson Racing	0	Ford	DAY	MOB	NSH	SLM; 22	TAL	TOL; 26	NJM	POC													19th	1,645	
2015	Wayne Peterson Racing	06	Ford									MCH; 22	CHI; 24	WIN; 19	IOW; 24								KAN; 24	19th	1,645	
2015	Wayne Peterson Racing	0	Chevy													IRP; 29	POC							19th	1,645	
2015	Wayne Peterson Racing	06	Dodge															BLN; 23	ISF; 24	DSF; 25	SLM; 27	KEN; 30		19th	1,645	
2016	Wayne Peterson Racing	06	Dodge	DAY	NSH	SLM; 24	TAL	TOL; 24	NJM; 24		MCH; 31	MAD; 20	WIN; 19	IOW; 24	IRP; 28		BLN; 22	ISF; 21	DSF; 19	SLM; 21	CHI; 28	KEN; 26		11th	2,540	
2016	Wayne Peterson Racing	0	Ford							POC; 36														11th	2,540	
2016	Wayne Peterson Racing	0	Chevy													POC; 28								11th	2,540	
2016	Wayne Peterson Racing	0	Dodge																				KAN; 24	11th	2,540	
2017	Wayne Peterson Racing	0	Chevy	DAY; 39			TAL; 21											ROA; 22	DSF; 24					11th	2,985	
2017	Wayne Peterson Racing	0	Dodge		NSH; 26	SLM; 19		TOL; 20	ELK; 20		MCH; 24	MAD; 17		IRP; 27	POC; DNQ	WIN; 20	ISF; 25							11th	2,985	
2017	Wayne Peterson Racing	88	Chevy							POC; 33														11th	2,985	
2017	Wayne Peterson Racing	06	Chevy										IOW; 22							SLM; 18	CHI; 27	KEN; 20	KAN; DNQ	11th	2,985	
2018	Wayne Peterson Racing	0	Chevy	DAY; 18					CLT; 29	POC; 30														11th	2,690	
2018	Wayne Peterson Racing	06	Dodge		NSH; 23	SLM; 21		TOL; 22			MCH; 21												KAN; 16	11th	2,690	
2018	Wayne Peterson Racing	06	Chevy				TAL; 14																	11th	2,690	
2018	Wayne Peterson Racing	06	Ford									MAD; 17	GTW; 24	CHI; 23	IOW; 22	ELK	POC; 23	ISF	BLN; 18	DSF	SLM; 22	IRP; 23		11th	2,690	
2019	Wayne Peterson Racing	06	Chevy	DAY; 22	FIF	SLM	TAL; 22	NSH	TOL	CLT; 22	POC	MCH	MAD	GTW										33rd	500	
2019	Wayne Peterson Racing	0	Chevy												CHI; 18	ELK	IOW	POC	ISF	DSF	SLM	IRP	KAN	33rd	500	
2020	Wayne Peterson Racing	0	Chevy	DAY; 14	PHO	TAL; 21	POC	IRP	KEN	IOW				MCH; 16										20th	198	
2020	Wayne Peterson Racing	06	Chevy								KAN; 15	TOL	TOL											20th	198	
2020	Wayne Peterson Racing	06	Toyota												DAY; 18	GTW	L44	TOL	BRI; 16	WIN; 10	MEM	ISF	KAN	20th	198	
2021	Wayne Peterson Racing	06	Chevy	DAY; 22	PHO	TAL; 20	KAN	TOL	CLT	MOH	POC	ELK	BLN	IOW	WIN	GLN	MCH	ISF	MLW	DSF	BRI	SLM	KAN	71st	46	
2022	Wayne Peterson Racing	0	Ford	DAY; 29	PHO	TAL	KAN	CLT	IOW	BLN	ELK													85th	35	
2022	Richmond Motorsports	27	Chevy									MOH; 25	POC	IRP	MCH	GLN	ISF	MLW	DSF	KAN	BRI	SLM	TOL	85th	35	
2024	Wayne Peterson Racing	06	Chevy	DAY; Wth	PHO																			60th	62	
2024	Wayne Peterson Racing	06	Ford			TAL; 28	DOV	KAN	CLT; 22	IOW	MOH	BLN	IRP	SLM	ELK									60th	62	
2024	Wayne Peterson Racing	06	Toyota													MCH; Wth	ISF	MLW	DSF	GLN	BRI	KAN		60th	62	
2024	Wayne Peterson Racing	0	Ford																				TOL; 20	60th	62	
2025	Wayne Peterson Racing	0	Toyota	DAY	PHO	TAL	KAN	CLT	MCH	BLN	ELK	LRP	DOV	IRP	IOW	GLN	ISF	MAD	DSF	BRI; 24	SLM	KAN	TOL	131st	20	
2026	Wayne Peterson Racing	06	Chevy	DAY; 31	PHO	KAN	TAL; 19	GLN	TOL	MCH; 20	POC	BER	ELK	CHI	LRP	IRP	IOW	ISF	MAD	DSF	SLM			57th	77	
2026	Wayne Peterson Racing	06	Toyota																			BRI; 29	KAN	57th	77	

==== ARCA Menards Series East ====
ARCA Menards Series East results
Year	Team	No.	Make	1	2	3	4	5	6	7	8	AMSEC	Pts	Ref
2020	Wayne Peterson Racing	06	Toyota	NSM	TOL	DOV	TOL	BRI; 16	FIF			46th	28	
2025	Wayne Peterson Racing	0	Toyota	FIF	CAR	NSV	FRS	DOV	IRP	IOW	BRI; 24	68th	20	
2026	Wayne Peterson Racing	06	Toyota	HCY	CAR	NSV	TOL	IRP	FRS	IOW	BRI; 29	67th	15	
