= Rick Clifton =

American racing driver

- Born: August 18, 1954 (age 72); Circleville, Ohio, U.S.

ARCA Menards Series career
- 43 races run over 12 years
- Best finish: 25th (2020)
- First race: 2010 Racing For Wildlife 200 (Michigan)
- Last race: 2020 Toyota 200 presented by Crosley Brands (Winchester)
Wins	Top tens	Poles
0	1	0

ARCA Menards Series East career
- 1 race run over 1 year
- Best finish: 49th (2020)
- First race: 2020 Royal Truck & Trailer 200 (Toledo)
Wins	Top tens	Poles
0	0	0
- Statistics up to date as of May 22, 2024.

Rick Clifton (born August 18, 1954) is an American professional stock car racing driver who has previously competed in the ARCA Menards Series.

Clifton mostly raced for Fast Track Racing, having made his debut with the team at Michigan International Speedway in 2010, where he raced sporadically from 2010 to 2020. He achieved his best finish of tenth at Toledo Speedway in 2020, and made his most recent start at Winchester Speedway of that year, where he started and finished eleventh.

== Motorsports results ==
=== ARCA Menards Series ===
(key) (Bold – Pole position awarded by qualifying time. Italics – Pole position earned by points standings or practice time. * – Most laps led.)

ARCA Menards Series results
Year	Team	No.	Make	1	2	3	4	5	6	7	8	9	10	11	12	13	14	15	16	17	18	19	20	21	AMSC	Pts	Ref
2010	Fast Track Racing	10	Chevy	DAY	PBE	SLM	TEX	TAL	TOL	POC	MCH; 28	IOW	MFD	POC											92nd	175	
2010	Fast Track Racing	10	Dodge												BLN; 30	NJE	ISF	CHI	DSF	TOL	SLM	KAN	CAR		92nd	175	
2011	Fast Track Racing	11	Chevy	DAY	TAL	SLM	TOL	NJE	CHI	POC	MCH; 22	WIN	BLN												73rd	285	
2011	Fast Track Racing	10	Chevy											IOW; 26	IRP	POC; 33	ISF	MAD	DSF	SLM	KAN	TOL			73rd	285	
2012	Fast Track Racing	11	Ford	DAY; 39	MOB	SLM	TAL	TOL	ELK	POC															37th	590	
2012	Fast Track Racing	10	Chevy								MCH; 18			IOW; 21	CHI	IRP									37th	590	
2012	Fast Track Racing	10	Ford									WIN; 28	NJE												37th	590	
2012	Fast Track Racing	18	Chevy														POC; 32	BLN	ISF						37th	590	
2012	Fast Track Racing	10	Dodge																	MAD; 20	SLM	DSF	KAN		37th	590	
2013	Fast Track Racing	34	Chevy	DAY; 23	MOB	SLM	TAL	TOL	ELK	POC															67th	390	
2013	Fast Track Racing	10	Dodge								MCH; 14	ROA	WIN	CHI	NJM	POC	BLN	ISF	MAD	DSF					67th	390	
2013	Fast Track Racing	10	Ford																		IOW; 23	SLM	KEN	KAN	67th	390	
2014	James Hylton Motorsports	48	Ford	DAY	MOB	SLM	TAL; 32	TOL	NJE	POC; 26				CHI; 17	IRP	POC	BLN	ISF	MAD	DSF	SLM				39th	560	
2014	Fast Track Racing	10	Ford								MCH; 19	ELK	WIN									KEN; 24	KAN		39th	560	
2015	Fast Track Racing	10	Ford	DAY	MOB	NSH; 22	SLM	TAL				MCH; 13	CHI	WIN	IOW; 19	IRP	POC	BLN	ISF	DSF	SLM	KEN; 19	KAN		30th	895	
2015	James Hylton Motorsports	48	Ford						TOL; 14	NJE; 26															30th	895	
2015	James Hylton Motorsports	49	Ford								POC; 30														30th	895	
2016	Fast Track Racing	10	Ford	DAY	NSH; 22	SLM	TAL	TOL							IRP; 18	POC	BLN	ISF	DSF	SLM	CHI				43rd	550	
2016	Fast Track Racing	27	Ford						NJE; 18	POC	MCH	MAD	WIN	IOW											43rd	550	
2016	Fast Track Racing	11	Ford																			KEN; 15	KAN		43rd	550	
2017	Fast Track Racing	10	Toyota	DAY	NSH; 20	SLM	TAL	TOL	ELK	POC	MCH	MAD	IOW	IRP	POC	WIN	ISF	ROA	DSF	SLM	CHI	KEN	KAN		102nd	130	
2018	Fast Track Racing	10	Toyota	DAY	NSH; 19	SLM	TAL				MCH; 16	MAD	GTW	CHI	IOW; 13	ELK	POC	ISF	BLN	DSF	SLM	IRP	KAN		32nd	645	
2018	Fast Track Racing	11	Ford					TOL; 17	CLT	POC															32nd	645	
2019	Fast Track Racing	11	Ford	DAY	FIF	SLM	TAL	NSH	TOL; 14	CLT	POC	MCH	MAD												39th	445	
2019	Fast Track Racing	11	Toyota											GTW; 21	CHI	ELK	IOW; 14	POC	ISF	DSF	SLM	IRP	KAN		39th	445	
2020	Fast Track Racing	12	Toyota	DAY	PHO	TAL	POC	IRP	KEN	IOW; 14	KAN	TOL; 10	TOL; 13	MCH	DAY	GTW	L44								25th	153	
2020	Fast Track Racing	11	Ford															TOL; 19	BRI						25th	153	
2020	Fast Track Racing	10	Chevy																	WIN; 11	MEM	ISF	KAN		25th	153	

==== ARCA Menards Series East ====
ARCA Menards Series East results
Year	Team	No.	Make	1	2	3	4	5	6	AMSEC	Pts	Ref
2020	Fast Track Racing	11	Ford	NSM	TOL	DOV	TOL; 19	BRI	FIF	49th	25	
