= Chad Bryant Racing =

Former ARCA Menards Series team

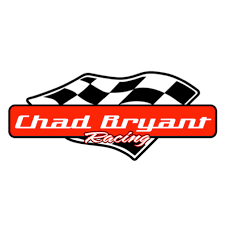
- Owner: Chad Bryant
- Base: Mooresville, North Carolina
- Series: ARCA Menards Series; ARCA Menards Series West; ZMAX CARS Tour
- Manufacturer: Ford
- Opened: 2018

Career
- Debut: ARCA Menards Series: 2018 Lucas Oil 200 (Daytona); ARCA Menards Series West: 2019 Arizona Lottery 100 (Phoenix)
- Race victories: Total: 4 ARCA Menards Series: 4

Chad Bryant Racing is an American professional stock car racing team that competed in the ARCA Menards Series and the ARCA Menards Series West. They currently compete in the zMAX CARS Tour Presented By SoundGear with Treyten Lapcevich as their driver.

== History ==
=== 2018 ===
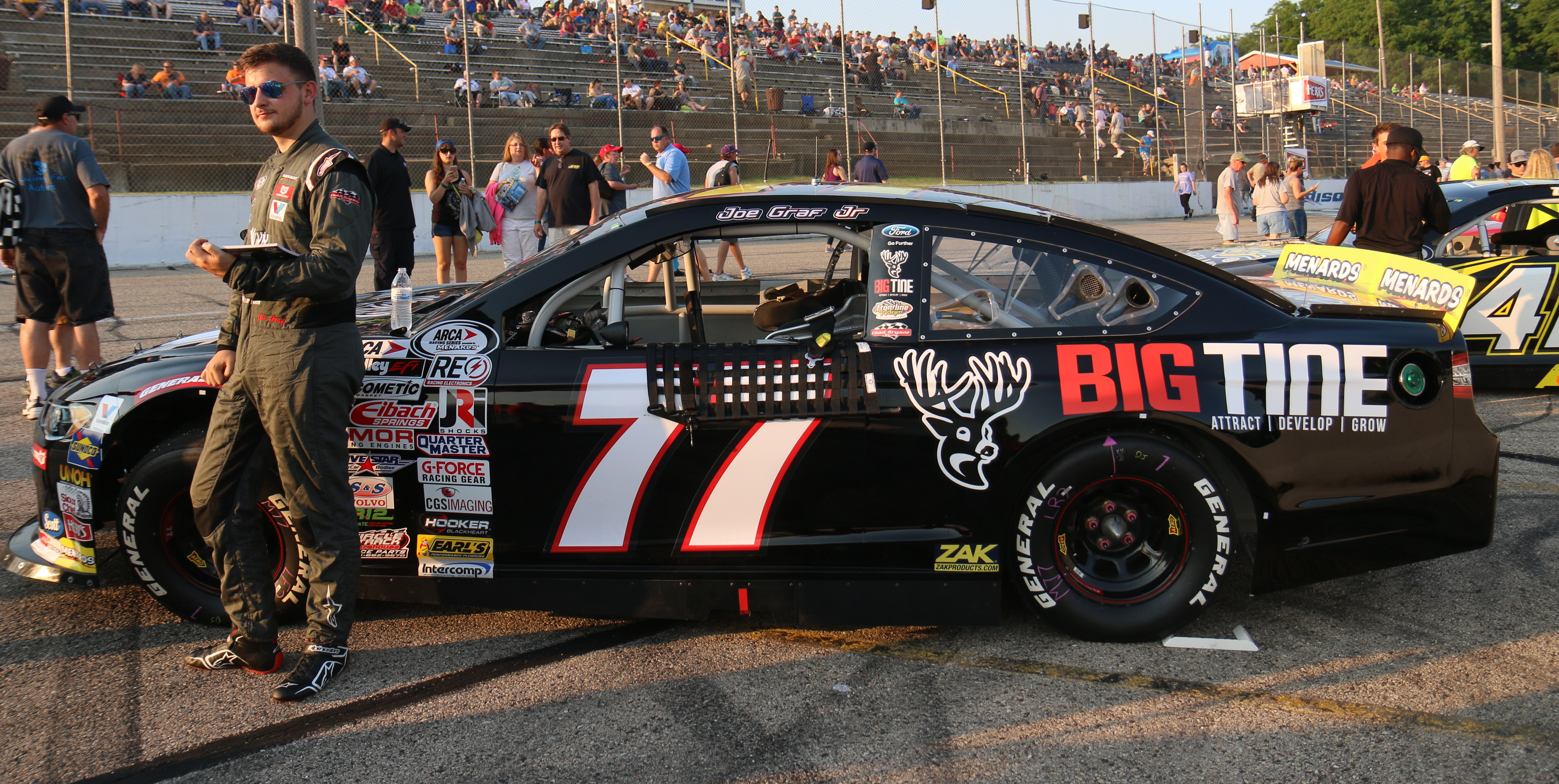
Graf standing next to his No. 77 car at Madison in 2018.

The team was formed on January 9, 2018 by ARCA crew chief Chad Bryant, who purchased the assets of the team he had been working for in the series, Cunningham Motorsports, which was being sold by its retiring owner Briggs Cunningham, who was age 85 at the time. His co-owner, 68-year-old Kerry Scherer, also decided to step away from team ownership and did not continue with the team after it was sold to Bryant.

The team was nearly the same as it was in 2017 before the change in ownership, as Bryant retained all personnel who remained with the team. However, since Cunningham's 2017 drivers Shane Lee and Dalton Sargeant both moved up to the NASCAR Xfinity and Truck Series, in 2018, Bryant needed new drivers for the team's No. 22 and No. 77 cars.

Bo LeMastus signed with the team to run at Daytona in the No. 77, and rookie Joe Graf Jr. joined CBR for what was initially set to be a part-time schedule starting at the second race of the season at Nashville. However, the team later decided to keep him on for the rest of the season. Due to lack of sponsorship and focusing on the transition in ownership, the team did not field the No. 22 at Daytona and they let Fast Track Racing use their owner points to field an additional entry at that race for Ed Pompa. Tyler Dippel drove the No. 22 at Nashville and Josh Berry at Salem. Due to a lack of sponsorship, the team withdrew from Talladega and only ran part-time for the remainder of the season. Dippel made another start in the car at Charlotte and Tom Hessert, who formerly drove the No. 77 full-time for their predecessor Cunningham team, ran at IRP as a replacement for Chase Briscoe. Briscoe was scheduled to be in the No. 22 for that race, but could not compete after the race was postponed to a month later due to rain, and the new race date conflicted with his Xfinity schedule.

Graf and Chad Finchum had driven for the team at ARCA's Daytona test in January. Finchum did not end up running any races with the team, and was in the car then to get approval to run at the track in his full-time Xfinity Series ride with MBM Motorsports.

Graf would go on to finish eighth in points in his first full-season in ARCA (minus one race), picking up one win at Berlin Raceway on August 25, 2018. He almost scored his first win at Talladega earlier that year, but lost to the No. 41 MDM Motorsports Toyota driven by Zane Smith in a photo finish at the line.

=== 2019 ===
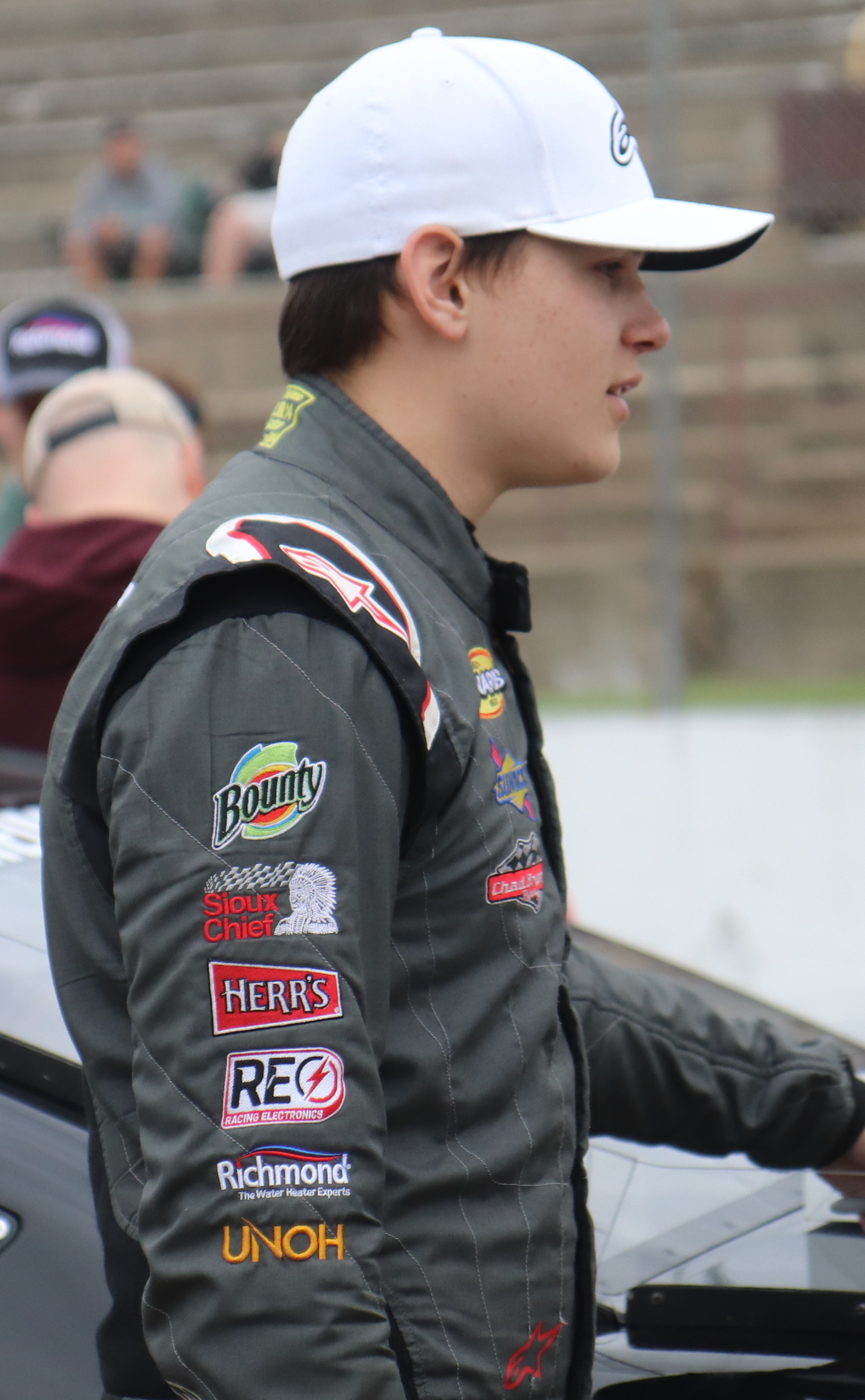
Corey Heim was one of three drivers of the No. 22 for the team in 2019.

In their second season as a team, Graf returned to the CBR No. 77 car full-time. The team was able to run the No. 22 car full-time again. That car would have a rotation of drivers during the season, with Connor Hall starting the season at Daytona with sponsorship from Marlow Yachts. Following that, CARS Super Late Model Tour driver Corey Heim began his slate of races in the No. 22. The team signed him in October 2018 to run the short track races. Crew chief Paul Andrews switched teams from Graf's No. 77 to the No. 22 for 2019, with Graf now having team owner Bryant as his crew chief. In the remaining races where Heim was not eligible to run, Ty Majeski — a Ford development driver who had previously competed for Roush Fenway Racing's NASCAR Xfinity Series team, which closed down after 2018, drove the team's No. 22 in six races. He returned to ARCA for the first time in two years, and doing so this time in an effort to rebuild his career after losing his ride. In dominant fashion, Majeski finished in the top-five in every single one of his starts, which included three wins, which came at Charlotte, Pocono and Chicago. In his other three races, he finished once in second at Michigan, third at Kansas and fourth at Nashville. His very strong performances led him to secure a full-time ride in 2020 in the Truck Series driving the No. 45 Chevrolet for Niece Motorsports, meaning he would leave Ford and CBR. Before he signed this deal, he ran one race for them in 2019 at Phoenix.

In addition, Chad Bryant Racing made their debut in the NASCAR K&N Pro Series West (which was soon to be renamed the ARCA Menards Series West), fielding two cars in the series' season-finale at Phoenix in preparation for when ARCA would visit the track for the first time in 2020. Majeski was entered in the No. 2 and Heim in the No. 22. It was both drivers' debuts in the West Series.

==== Car No. 7 results ====
ARCA Racing Series results
| Year | Team | No. | Make | 1 | 2 | 3 | 4 | 5 | 6 | 7 | 8 | 9 | 10 | 11 | 12 | 13 | 14 | 15 | 16 | 17 | 18 | 19 | 20 | AMSC | Pts |
|---|---|---|---|---|---|---|---|---|---|---|---|---|---|---|---|---|---|---|---|---|---|---|---|---|---|
| 2019 | Connor Hall | 7 | Chevy | DAY | FIF | SLM | TAL | NSH | TOL | CLT | POC; 16 | MCH | MAD | GTW | CHI | ELK | IOW | POC | ISF | DSF | SLM | IRP | KAN | | |

==== Car No. 22 results ====
ARCA Racing Series results
| Year | Team | No. | Make | 1 | 2 | 3 | 4 | 5 | 6 | 7 | 8 | 9 | 10 | 11 | 12 | 13 | 14 | 15 | 16 | 17 | 18 | 19 | 20 | AMSC | Pts |
|---|---|---|---|---|---|---|---|---|---|---|---|---|---|---|---|---|---|---|---|---|---|---|---|---|---|
| 2018 | Tyler Dippel | 22 | Ford | DAY | NSH; 6 | | TAL | TOL | CLT; 25 | POC | MCH | MAD | GTW | CHI | IOW | ELK | POC | ISF | BLN | DSF | SLM | | KAN | | |
| 2018 | Josh Berry | 22 | Ford | | | SLM; 4 | | | | | | | | | | | | | | | | | | | |
| 2018 | Tom Hessert III | 22 | Ford | | | | | | | | | | | | | | | | | | | IRP; 9 | | | |
| 2019 | Connor Hall | 22 | Ford | DAY; 11 | | | | | | | | | | | | | | | | | | | | | |
| 2019 | Corey Heim | 22 | Ford | | FIF; 5 | SLM; 5 | | NSV; 11 | TOL; 10 | | | | MAD; 10 | GTW; 4 | | IOW; 5 | POC; 6 | ELK; 4 | ISF; 7 | DSF; 3 | SLM; 3 | IRP; 4 | | | |
| 2019 | Ty Majeski | 22 | Ford | | | | TAL; 4 | | | CLT; 1 | POC; 1 | MCH; 2 | | | CHI; 1* | | | | | | | | KAN; 3 | | |
| 2020 | Connor Hall | 22 | Ford | DAY; 20 | | | | | | | | | | | | | | | | | | | | | |
| 2020 | Christian McGhee | 22 | Ford | | PHO; 12 | | | | | | | | | | | | | | | | | | | | |
| 2020 | Brandon Lynn | 22 | Ford | | | TAL; 15 | | | | | | | | | | | | | | | | | | | |
| 2020 | Derek Griffith | 22 | Ford | | | | POC; 8 | IRP; 12 | KEN; 7 | | KAN; 8 | TOL; 7 | TOL; 5 | MCH | | | | TOL | BRI; 9 | WIN | | ISF | KAN; 3 | | |
| 2020 | Kody Swanson | 22 | Ford | | | | | | | IOW; 8 | | | | | | | | | | | | | | | |
| 2020 | Parker Chase | 22 | Ford | | | | | | | | | | | | DAY; 10 | | | | | | | | | | |
| 2020 | Kris Wright | 22 | Chevy | | | | | | | | | | | | | GTW; 18 | L44; 7 | | | | MEM; 10 | | | | |

==== Car No. 77 results ====
ARCA Racing Series results
| Year | Team | No. | Make | 1 | 2 | 3 | 4 | 5 | 6 | 7 | 8 | 9 | 10 | 11 | 12 | 13 | 14 | 15 | 16 | 17 | 18 | 19 | 20 | AMSC | Pts |
|---|---|---|---|---|---|---|---|---|---|---|---|---|---|---|---|---|---|---|---|---|---|---|---|---|---|
| 2018 | Bo LeMastus | 77 | Ford | DAY; 31 | | | | | | | | | | | | | | | | | | | | | |
| 2018 | Joe Graf Jr. | 77 | Ford | | NSH; 16 | SLM; 11 | TAL; 2 | TOL; 3 | CLT; 18 | POC; 7 | MCH; 5 | MAD; 12 | GTW; 8 | CHI; 13 | IOW; 5 | ELK; 3 | POC; 26 | ISF; 16 | BLN; 1 | DSF; 11 | SLM; 11 | IRP; 13 | KAN; 21 | | |
| 2019 | Joe Graf Jr. | 77 | Ford | DAY; 21 | FIF; 11 | SLM; 9 | TAL; 10 | NSH; 6 | TOL; 17 | CLT; 12 | POC; 8 | | MAD; 9 | GTW; 11 | CHI; 11 | ELK; 7 | IOW; 9 | | ISF; 10 | DSF; 11 | SLM; 6 | IRP; 10 | KAN; 9 | | |
| 2019 | Joe Graf Jr. | 77 | Chevy | | | | | | | | | MCH; 4 | | | | | | POC; 10 | | | | | | | |
| 2020 | Jacob Heafner | 77 | Ford | DAY; 27 | PHO | TAL | POC | IRP | KEN | IOW | KAN | TOL | TOL | MCH | DAY | GTW | L44 | TOL | BRI | WIN | MEM | ISF | KAN | | |
