= Zinsser SmartCoat 200 (Lebanon) =

Former ARCA Menards Series race

ARCA Menards Series
- Venue: Lebanon I-44 Speedway
- Location: Lebanon, Missouri
- Corporate sponsor: Zinsser SmartCoat
- First race: 2013
- Last race: 2020
- Distance: 75 miles (120.701 km)
- Laps: 200
- Previous names: Toyota/G-Oil 150 (2013)
- Most wins (driver): Michael Self & Sam Mayer (1)
- Most wins (team): Richard Childress Racing with Jim Offenbach & GMS Racing (1)
- Most wins (manufacturer): Chevrolet (2)

Circuit information
- Surface: Asphalt
- Length: 0.375 mi (0.604 km)
- Turns: 4

The Zinsser SmartCoat 200 was a 75-mile (120.701 km) West Series and ARCA Menards Series race held at Lebanon I-44 Speedway in Lebanon, Missouri. It has been held twice, with the inaugural running being as a NASCAR K&N Pro Series West (later ARCA Menards Series West) race in 2013. The second running of the race was a part of the ARCA Menards Series schedule in 2020 to replace the race at Madison International Speedway, which was cancelled due to COVID-19 state regulations in Wisconsin.

== History ==
Michael Self is the only driver to have competed in both races at the track. He ran full-time in the West Series in 2013 and ran full-time in the ARCA Menards Series in 2020. He won the 2013 race to score his third win in a row of the season (which were all the races he won that year) and finished sixth in the 2020 race.

== Past winners ==
=== NASCAR K&N Pro Series West ===
Year	Date	No.	Driver	Team	Manufacturer	Race distance		Race time	Average speed (mph)
Year	Date	No.	Driver	Team	Manufacturer	Laps	Miles (km)	Race time	Average speed (mph)
2013	June 9	21	Michael Self	Richard Childress Racing with Jim Offenbach	Chevrolet	153*	57.375 (92.336)	1:02:32	54.317

* Race extended due to a green-white-checker finish.

=== ARCA Menards Series ===
Year	Date	No.	Driver	Team	Manufacturer	Race distance		Race time	Average speed (mph)
Year	Date	No.	Driver	Team	Manufacturer	Laps	Miles (km)	Race time	Average speed (mph)
2020	September 5	21	Sam Mayer	GMS Racing	Chevrolet	200	75 (120.701)	1:19:49	55.627
