= Don Thompson (racing driver) =

American racing driver (born 1954)

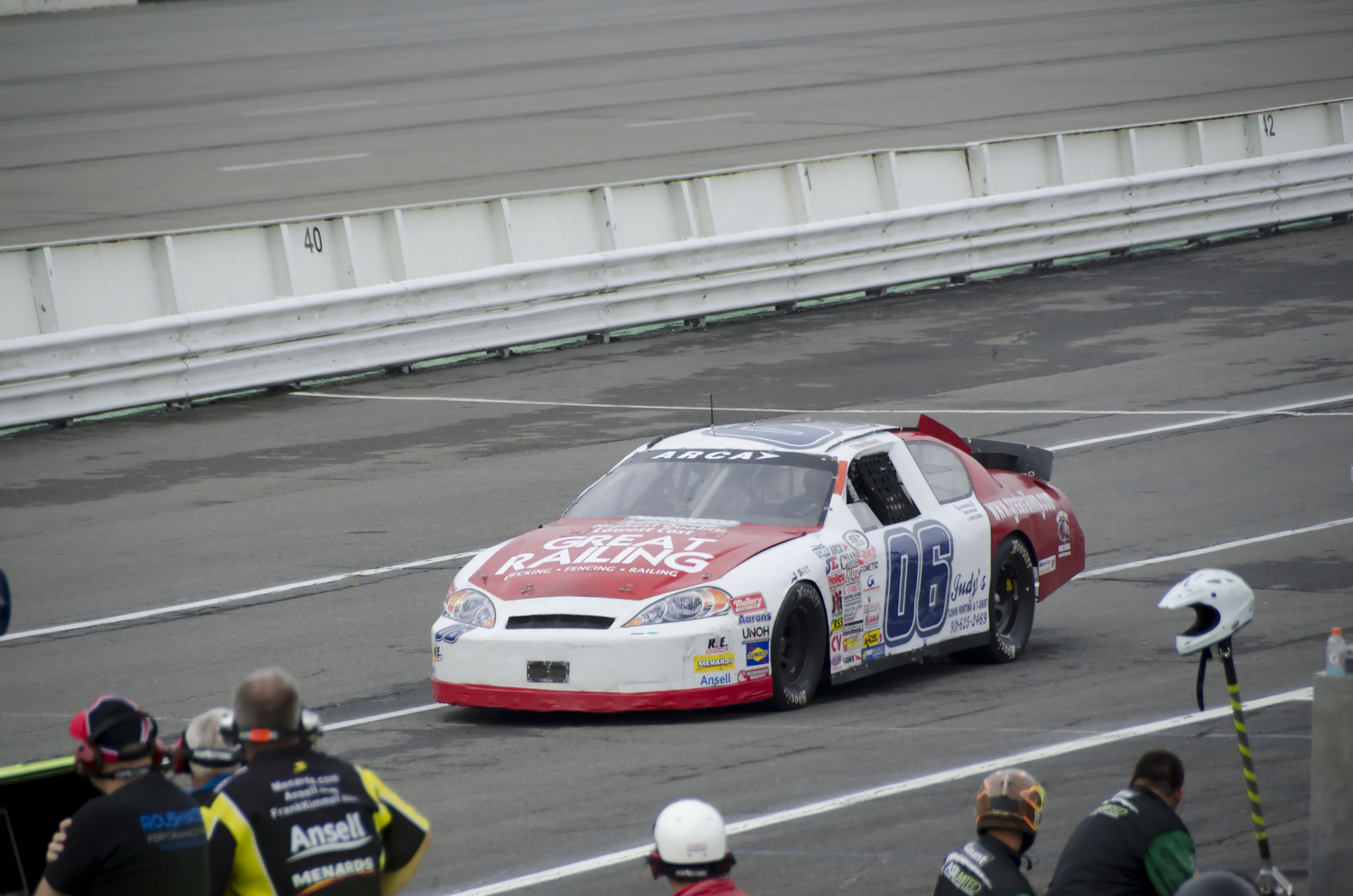
- Thompson's No. 06 ARCA car at Pocono Raceway in 2011
- Born: March 10, 1954 (age 72); Carlisle, Pennsylvania, U.S.

ARCA Menards Series career
- 23 races run over 13 years
- Best finish: 47th (2020)
- First race: 2011 Pennsylvania ARCA 125 (Pocono)
- Last race: 2025 Berlin ARCA 200 (Berlin)
Wins	Top tens	Poles
0	0	0

ARCA Menards Series East career
- 1 race run over 1 year
- Best finish: 55th (2021)
- First race: 2021 Bush's Beans 200 (Bristol)
Wins	Top tens	Poles
0	0	0
- Statistics up to date as of June 15, 2025.

Don Thompson (born March 10, 1954) is an American professional stock car racing driver who last competed in the ARCA Menards Series, driving the No. 9 Toyota for Fast Track Racing.

Over the course of his ARCA career, Thompson mostly competed at his home track of Pocono Raceway, primarily driving for Wayne Peterson Racing, getting a best track finish of eighteenth in 2020. His best finish was a sixteenth-place finish at Kentucky Speedway. He also made one ARCA Menards Series East start at Bristol Motor Speedway, which was a combination event with the main ARCA series, where he finished 30th due to brake issues.

In 2023, it was revealed that Thompson would drive the No. 45 Chevrolet for Tamayo Cosentino Racing at Pocono, where he posted no time in the lone practice session, qualified in 23rd, and finished 22nd due to mechanical issues.

== Motorsports results ==
=== ARCA Menards Series ===
(key) (Bold – Pole position awarded by qualifying time. Italics – Pole position earned by points standings or practice time. * – Most laps led.)

ARCA Menards Series results
Year	Team	No.	Make	1	2	3	4	5	6	7	8	9	10	11	12	13	14	15	16	17	18	19	20	21	AMSC	Pts	Ref
2011	Wayne Peterson Racing	06	Chevy	DAY	TAL	SLM	TOL	NJE	CHI	POC	MCH	WIN	BLN	IOW	IRP	POC; 31	ISF	MAD	DSF	SLM	KAN	TOL			155th	75	
2012	Wayne Peterson Racing	0	Ford	DAY	MOB	SLM	TAL	TOL	ELK	POC; 28	MCH	WIN	NJE	IOW	CHI	IRP	POC; 33	BLN	ISF	MAD	SLM	DSF	KAN		108th	155	
2013	Wayne Peterson Racing	0	Chevy	DAY	MOB	SLM	TAL	TOL	ELK	POC; 29	MCH	ROA	WIN	CHI	NJM										121st	140	
2013	Roulo Brothers Racing	99	Ford													POC; 35	BLN	ISF	MAD	DSF	IOW	SLM	KEN	KAN	121st	140	
2014	Wayne Peterson Racing	0	Ford	DAY	MOB	SLM	TAL	TOL	NJE	POC; 28	MCH	ELK	WIN	CHI	IRP										80th	200	
2014	Wayne Peterson Racing	06	Ford													POC; 24	BLN	ISF	MAD	DSF	SLM	KEN	KAN		80th	200	
2015	Wayne Peterson Racing	06	Ford	DAY	MOB	NSH	SLM	TAL	TOL	NJE; 22	POC; 23	MCH	CHI	WIN	IOW	IRP									70th	345	
2015	Wayne Peterson Racing	0	Ford														POC; 24	BLN	ISF	DSF	SLM	KEN	KAN		70th	345	
2016	Wayne Peterson Racing	06	Dodge	DAY	NSH	SLM	TAL	TOL	NJE	POC; 32	MCH	MAD	WIN	IOW	IRP	POC; 22	BLN	ISF	DSF	SLM	CHI	KEN	KAN		97th	190	
2017	Wayne Peterson Racing	06	Chevy	DAY	NSH	SLM	TAL; 20	TOL	ELK																75th	225	
2017	Wayne Peterson Racing	0	Dodge							POC; 32	MCH	MAD	IOW	IRP	POC; DNQ	WIN	ISF	ROA	DSF	SLM	CHI	KEN	KAN		75th	225	
2018	Wayne Peterson Racing	06	Dodge	DAY	NSH	SLM	TAL	TOL	CLT; 28	POC; 27	MCH	MAD	GTW	CHI	IOW	ELK									69th	270	
2018	Wayne Peterson Racing	0	Dodge														POC; 29	ISF	BLN	DSF	SLM	IRP	KAN		69th	270	
2019	Wayne Peterson Racing	0	Chevy	DAY	FIF	SLM	TAL	NSH	TOL	CLT	POC	MCH	MAD	GTW	CHI	ELK	IOW	POC; 20	ISF	DSF	SLM	IRP	KAN		85th	25	
2020	Wayne Peterson Racing	06	Chevy	DAY	PHO	TAL	POC; 18	IRP	KEN; 16	IOW	KAN	TOL	TOL	MCH	DRC	GTW	I44	TOL	BRI	WIN	MEM	ISF	KAN		47th	54	
2021	Wayne Peterson Racing	06	Ford	DAY	PHO	TAL	KAN	TOL	CLT	MOH	POC; 19	ELK	BLN	IOW	WIN	GLN	MCH	ISF	MLW	DSF					74th	39	
2021	Wayne Peterson Racing	06	Chevy																		BRI; 30	SLM	KAN		74th	39	
2023	Tamayo Cosentino Racing	45	Chevy	DAY	PHO	TAL	KAN	CLT	BLN	ELK	MOH	IOW	POC; 22	MCH	IRP	GLN	ISF	MLW	DSF	KAN	BRI	SLM	TOL		109th	22	
2025	Fast Track Racing	9	Toyota	DAY	PHO	TAL	KAN	CLT	MCH	BLN; 21	ELK	LRP	DOV	IRP	IOW	GLN	ISF	MAD	DSF	BRI	SLM	KAN	TOL		125th	23	

==== ARCA Menards Series East ====
ARCA Menards Series East results
Year	Team	No.	Make	1	2	3	4	5	6	7	8	AMSEC	Pts	Ref
2021	Wayne Peterson Racing	06	Chevy	NSM	FIF	NSV	DOV	SNM	IOW	MLW	BRI; 30	55th	14	
