= Ron Vandermeir Jr. =

American racing driver (born 1982)

- Born: August 18, 1982 (age 44); Sheridan, Illinois, U.S.

ARCA Menards Series career
- 11 races run over 4 years
- Best finish: 21st (2022)
- First race: 2021 Menards 250 (Elko)
- Last race: 2026 Alabama Manufactured Housing 200 (Talladega)
Wins	Top tens	Poles
0	3	0

ARCA Menards Series East career
- 6 races run over 3 years
- Best finish: 13th (2022)
- First race: 2021 Sprecher 150 (Milwaukee)
- Last race: 2023 Sprecher 150 (Milwaukee)
Wins	Top tens	Poles
0	1	0
- Statistics up to date as of April 25, 2026.

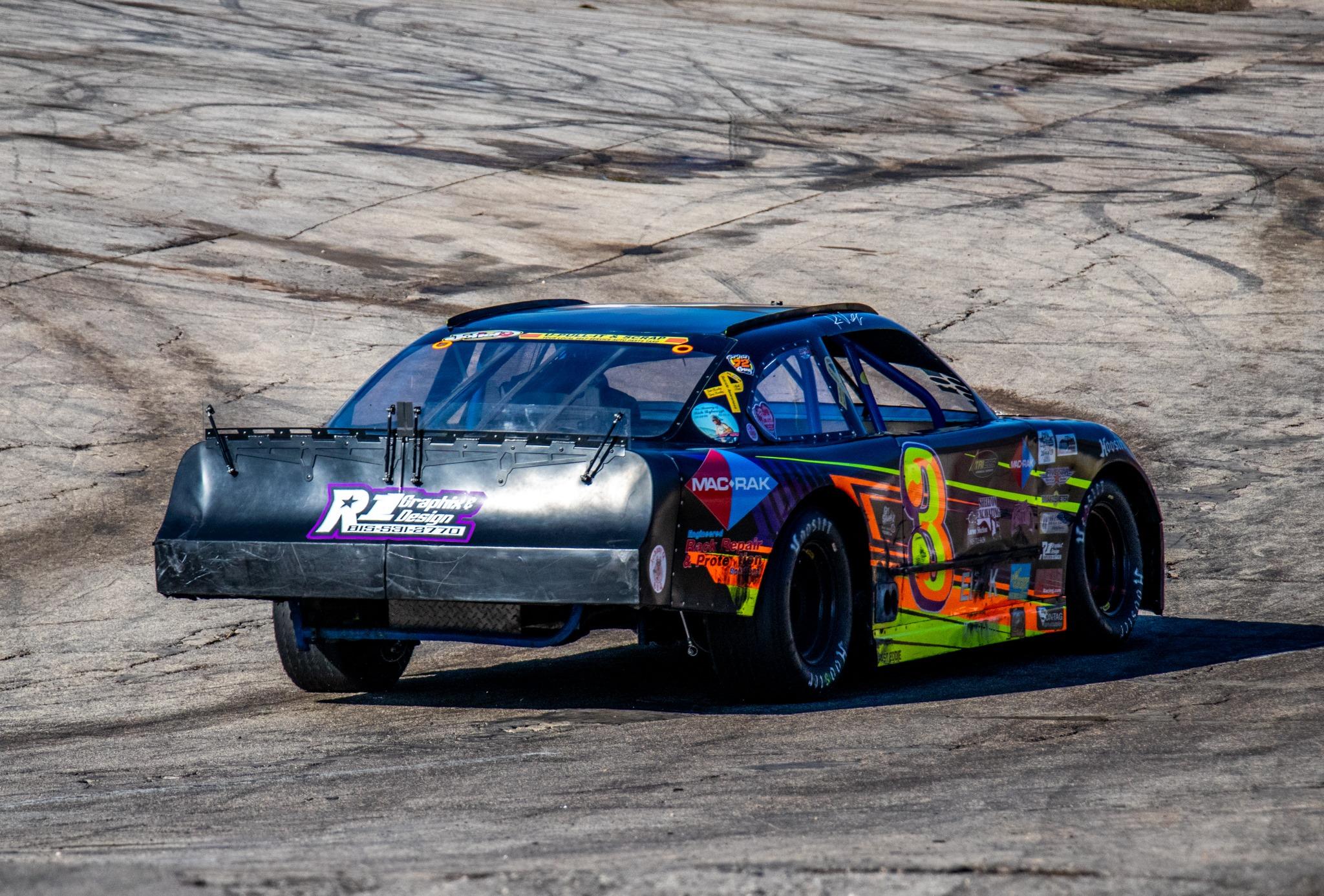
Vandermeir's 2020 Mid American Stock Car

Ron Vandermeir Jr. (born August 18, 1982) is an American professional stock car racing driver. He last competed part-time in the ARCA Menards Series, driving the No. 26 for Vanco Racing. He won the 2018, 2019, 2020, and 2021 Mid-American Stock Car Series championship in the Upper Midwestern United States.

== Racing career ==
Vandermeir made his ARCA Menards Series debut in the 2021 season at Elko Speedway where he started eighth and finished eleventh. He then ran at Milwaukee and the season finale at Kansas, where he finished 14th and 15th respectively.

In 2022, it was announced that Vandermeir would make select starts for Vanco Racing. He would make his first start of the year at the Dutch Boy 150, driving the No. 27, where he started ninth and finished eighth. He also drove the No. 44 at Iowa, Kansas II, and Bristol, and the No. 66 at Elko and Milwaukee, securing a top-ten at Iowa and Elko, respectively.

In 2023, it was revealed that Vandermeir would drive the No. 10 Toyota for Fast Track Racing at the Milwaukee Mile combination race with the ARCA Menards Series East.

After not racing in ARCA for the next two years, it was revealed in 2026 that Vandermeir would participate in the pre-season test for the ARCA Menards Series at Daytona International Speedway, driving for FTR, where he set the 76th quickest time between the two sessions held.

== Motorsports career results ==
=== ARCA Menards Series ===
(key) (Bold – Pole position awarded by qualifying time. Italics – Pole position earned by points standings or practice time. * – Most laps led. ** – All laps led.)

ARCA Menards Series results
Year	Team	No.	Make	1	2	3	4	5	6	7	8	9	10	11	12	13	14	15	16	17	18	19	20	AMSC	Pts	Ref
2021	Vanco Racing	66	Toyota	DAY	PHO	TAL	KAN	TOL	CLT	MOH	POC	ELK; 11	BLN	IOW	WIN	GLN	MCH	ISF	MLW; 14	DSF; Wth	BRI	SLM		39th	92	
2021	Fast Track Racing	11	Ford																				KAN; 20	39th	92	
2022	Vanco Racing	27	Ford	DAY	PHO	TAL	KAN; 8	CLT																21st	192	
2022	Vanco Racing	44	Ford						IOW; 9	BLN										KAN; 21	BRI; 11	SLM	TOL	21st	192	
2022	Vanco Racing	66	Toyota								ELK; 10	MOH	POC	IRP	MCH	GLN	ISF	MLW; 13	DSF					21st	192	
2023	Fast Track Racing	10	Ford	DAY	PHO	TAL	KAN	CLT	BLN	ELK	MOH	IOW	POC	MCH	IRP	GLN	ISF	MLW; 18	DSF	KAN	BRI	SLM	TOL	105th	26	
2026	Vanco Racing	26	Toyota	DAY; DNQ	PHO	KAN	TAL; 24	GLN	TOL	MCH	POC	BER	ELK	CHI	LRP	IRP	IOW	ISF	MAD	DSF	SLM	BRI	KAN	116th	23	

==== ARCA Menards Series East ====
ARCA Menards Series East results
Year	Team	No.	Make	1	2	3	4	5	6	7	8	AMSEC	Pts	Ref
2021	Vanco Racing	66	Toyota	NSM	FIF	NSV	DOV	SNM	IOW	MLW; 14	BRI	46th	30	
2022	Vanco Racing	44	Ford	NSM	FIF	DOV	NSV	IOW; 9		BRI; 11		13th	149	
2022	Vanco Racing	66	Toyota						MLW; 13			13th	149	
2023	Fast Track Racing	10	Ford	FIF	DOV	NSV	FRS	IOW	IRP	MLW; 18	BRI	50th	26	
