= Ross Dalton =

American racing driver

- Born: October 28, 1994 (age 32); Liberty, North Carolina, U.S.
- Achievements: 2022 All-Pro Limited Late Model Series Champion

ARCA Menards Series East career
- 1 race run over 1 year
- Best finish: 43rd (2021)
- First race: 2021 Southern National 200 (Kenly)
Wins	Top tens	Poles
0	0	0
- Statistics up to date as of November 15, 2025.

Ross "Boo Boo" Dalton (born October 28, 1994) is an American professional stock car racing driver and team owner. He currently competes part-time in Late Model Stock Car competition, driving the No. 50 for his own team, Ross Dalton Racing. He has previously competed in the ARCA Menards Series East and the CARS Late Model Stock Tour.

Dalton has also previously competed in series such as the All-Pro Limited Late Model Series, the Southeast Limited Late Model Series, the Mid-Atlantic Street Stock Championship Series, and the NASCAR Advance Auto Parts Weekly Series.

== Motorsports career results ==
=== ARCA Menards Series East ===
(key) (Bold - Pole position awarded by qualifying time. Italics - Pole position earned by points standings or practice time. * – Most laps led.)

ARCA Menards Series East results
Year	Team	No.	Make	1	2	3	4	5	6	7	8	AMSEC	Pts	Ref
2021	Empire Racing	8	Ford	NSM	FIF	NSV	DOV	SNM; 11	IOW	MLW	BRI	43rd	33	

=== CARS Late Model Stock Car Tour ===
(key) (Bold – Pole position awarded by qualifying time. Italics – Pole position earned by points standings or practice time. * – Most laps led. ** – All laps led.)

CARS Late Model Stock Car Tour results
Year	Team	No.	Make	1	2	3	4	5	6	7	8	9	10	CLMSCTC	Pts	Ref
2020	Ross Dalton Racing	50	Chevy	SNM	ACE	HCY	HCY	DOM	FCS	LGY	CCS	FLO	GRE; 27	60th	6	
