= Davey Callihan =

American racing driver

- Born: August 17, 1989 (age 37); Fredericksburg, Virginia, U.S.

ARCA Menards Series career
- 1 race run over 1 year
- Best finish: 74th (2023)
- First race: 2023 Menards 250 (Elko)
Wins	Top tens	Poles
0	1	0

ARCA Menards Series East career
- 1 race run over 1 year
- Best finish: 37th (2021)
- First race: 2021 Southern National 200 presented by Solid Rock Carriers (Kenly)
Wins	Top tens	Poles
0	1	0
- Statistics up to date as of August 10, 2023.

Davey Callihan (born August 17, 1989) is an American professional stock car racing driver who last competed part-time in the ARCA Menards Series, driving the No. 01 Toyota for Fast Track Racing.

== Racing career ==
Callihan first began racing in go karts and motorcycles before transitioning over to stock cars in 2010. He would go on to mainly compete at Dominion Raceway in the Virginia Racer class, where he would finish third in the standings with two wins in 2020.

In 2021, Callihan would make his debut in the ARCA Menards Series East at Southern National Motorsports Park, driving the No. 3 Ford for Mullins Racing, having previously ran with the team during the pre-season test at Daytona International Speedway earlier in the year. He would start eleventh and finish three laps down in ninth place.

In 2022, would compete in various late-model events, including making his debut in the CARS Late Model Stock Tour at Dominion, where he would finish 21st to due a mechanical issue. It was also during this year that he was involved in an incident following a qualifying heat race for the Virginia Late Model Triple Crown Series event at Martinsville Speedway, where he would make contact with Andrew Grady whilst fighting for a transfer spot late in the race. Following the race, Grady would run over to Callihan's car, where he would proceed to punch Callihan while he was still sitting in his car. Grady would then proceed to kick Callihan's car as he was carried away by a staff member. Grady would later go on to claim that Callihan had been giving him obscene gestures as he was walking over to the latters car, although Callihan denied this claim, and that Callihan "had no business driving a late-model, let alone a lawn mower". Grady would fail to qualify for the event while Callihan would go on to finish 22nd in the main event.

In 2023, it was announced that Callihan would make his debut in the main ARCA Menards Series at Elko Speedway, driving the No. 01 Toyota for Fast Track Racing in collaboration with Mullins Racing. He would start eighth and finish on the lead lap in sixth place despite being involved in a collision with Frankie Muniz late in the race.

== Motorsports results ==
=== ARCA Menards Series ===
(key) (Bold – Pole position awarded by qualifying time. Italics – Pole position earned by points standings or practice time. * – Most laps led.)

ARCA Menards Series results
Year	Team	No.	Make	1	2	3	4	5	6	7	8	9	10	11	12	13	14	15	16	17	18	19	20	AMSC	Pts	Ref
2023	Fast Track Racing	01	Toyota	DAY	PHO	TAL	KAN	CLT	BLN	ELK; 6	MOH	IOW	POC	MCH	IRP	GLN	ISF	MLW	DSF	KAN	BRI	SLM	TOL	74th	38	

==== ARCA Menards Series East ====
ARCA Menards Series East results
Year	Team	No.	Make	1	2	3	4	5	6	7	8	AMSEC	Pts	Ref
2021	Mullins Racing	3	Ford	NSM	FIF	NSV	DOV	SNM; 9	IOW	MLW	BRI	37th	35	

=== CARS Late Model Stock Car Tour ===
(key) (Bold – Pole position awarded by qualifying time. Italics – Pole position earned by points standings or practice time. * – Most laps led. ** – All laps led.)

CARS Late Model Stock Car Tour results
Year	Team	No.	Make	1	2	3	4	5	6	7	8	9	10	11	12	13	14	15	16	17	CLMSCTC	Pts	Ref
2022	Callihan Motorsports	41	Chevy	CRW	HCY	GRE	AAS	FCS	LGY	DOM; 21	HCY	ACE	MMS	NWS	TCM	ACE	SBO	CRW			67th	12	
2024	Callihan Motorsports	41	Toyota	SNM	HCY	AAS	OCS	ACE	TCM	LGY	DOM; 12	CRW	HCY	NWS	ACE	WCS	FLC	SBO	TCM	NWS	N/A	0	
