= Colt Hensley =

American racing driver

- Born: October 21, 2003 (age 23); Avon Park, Florida, U.S.

ARCA Menards Series East career
- 1 race run over 1 year
- Best finish: 35th (2021)
- First race: 2021 Jeep Beach 175 (New Smyrna)
Wins	Top tens	Poles
0	1	0
- Statistics up to date as of February 3, 2025.

Colt Hensley (born October 21, 2003) is an American professional stock car racing driver who has competed in the ARCA Menards Series East.

Hensley has also previously competed in the Florida Pro Truck Challenge Series and the World Series of Asphalt Stock Car Racing.

== Motorsports results ==
=== ARCA Menards Series East ===
(key) (Bold - Pole position awarded by qualifying time. Italics - Pole position earned by points standings or practice time. * – Most laps led.)

ARCA Menards Series East results
Year	Team	No.	Make	1	2	3	4	5	6	7	8	AMSEC	Pts	Ref
2021	Jett Motorsports	09	Toyota	NSM; 7	FIF	NSV	DOV	SNM	IOW	MLW	BRI	35th	37	
