= 2021 Southern National 200 =

Race details
- Race 5 of 8 in the 2021 ARCA Menards Series East season
- Date: June 12, 2021
- Location: Southern National Motorsports Park in Lucama, North Carolina
- Course: Permanent racing facility
- Course length: 0.40 miles (0.64 km)
- Distance: 200 laps, 80.00 mi (128.79 km)
- Average speed: 75.989 miles per hour (122.292 km/h)

Pole position
| Driver | Mason Diaz | Visconti Motorsports |
- Time: 15.558

Most laps led
| Driver | Mason Diaz | Joe Gibbs Racing |
- Laps: 130

Winner
| No. 18 | Sammy Smith | Joe Gibbs Racing |

The 2021 Southern National 200 was a ARCA Menards Series East race held on June 12, 2021. It was contested over 200 laps on the 0.40-mile (0.64 km) short track. It was the fifth race of the 2021 ARCA Menards Series East season. Joe Gibbs Racing driver Sammy Smith collected his third win of the season.

== Background ==
=== Entry list ===
- (R) denotes rookie driver.
- (i) denotes driver who is ineligible for series driver points.

| No. | Driver | Team | Manufacturer |
|---|---|---|---|
| 3 | Davey Callihan | Mullins Racing | Ford |
| 6 | Rajah Caruth | Rev Racing | Chevrolet |
| 8 | Ross Dalton | Empire Racing | Ford |
| 10 | Owen Smith | Fast Track Racing | Ford |
| 11 | Mason Mingus | Fast Track Racing | Ford |
| 12 | Stephanie Moyer | Fast Track Racing | Toyota |
| 18 | Sammy Smith | Joe Gibbs Racing | Toyota |
| 21 | Daniel Dye | GMS Racing | Chevrolet |
| 30 | Max Gutiérrez | Rette Jones Racing | Ford |
| 41 | Morgan Alexander | Cook-Finley Racing | Chevrolet |
| 42 | Parker Retzlaff | Cook-Finley Racing | Toyota |
| 48 | Brad Smith | Brad Smith Motorsports | Chevrolet |
| 54 | Joey Iest | David Gilliland Racing | Ford |
| 74 | Mason Diaz | Visconti Motorsports | Toyota |
| 91 | Justin Carroll | TC Motorsports | Toyota |
| 06 | Wayne Peterson | Wayne Peterson Racing | Chevrolet |
Official entry list

== Practice ==
Joey Iest was the fastest in practice with a time of 15.594 seconds and a speed of 92.343 mph (148.612 km/h).

| Pos | No. | Driver | Team | Manufacturer | Time | Speed |
|---|---|---|---|---|---|---|
| 1 | 54 | Joey Iest | David Gilliland Racing | Ford | 15.594 | 92.343 |
| 2 | 74 | Mason Diaz | Visconti Motorsport | Toyota | 15.674 | 91.872 |
| 3 | 18 | Sammy Smith | Joe Gibbs Racing | Toyota | 15.697 | 91.737 |
Official practice results

== Qualifying ==
Mason Diaz earned the pole award, posting a time of 15.558 seconds and a speed of 92.557 mph (148.956 km/h)

=== Starting Lineups ===
| Pos | No | Driver | Team | Manufacturer | Time |
|---|---|---|---|---|---|
| 1 | 74 | Mason Diaz | Visconti Motorsports | Toyota | 15.558 |
| 2 | 11 | Mason Mingus | Fast Track Racing | Ford Motor Company | 15.728 |
| 3 | 42 | Parker Retzlaff | Cook-Finley Racing | Toyota | 15.777 |
| 4 | 6 | Rajah Caruth | Rev Racing | Chevrolet | 15.789 |
| 5 | 54 | Joey Iest | David Gilliland Racing | Ford | 15.813 |
| 6 | 18 | Sammy Smith | Joe Gibbs Racing | Toyota | 15.93 |
| 7 | 21 | Daniel Dye | GMS Racing | Chevrolet | 16.171 |
| 8 | 30 | Max Gutierrez | Rette Jones Racing | Ford | 16.215 |
| 9 | 91 | Justin Carroll | TC Motorsports | Toyota | 16.224 |
| 10 | 8 | Ross Dalton | Empire Racing | Ford | 16.317 |
| 11 | 3 | Davey Callihan | Mullins Racing | Ford | 16.388 |
| 12 | 41 | Morgan Alexander | Cook-Finley Racing | Chevrolet | 16.629 |
| 13 | 12 | Stephanie Moyer | Fast Track Racing | Toyota | 17.071 |
| 14 | 10 | Owen Smith | Fast Track Racing | Ford | 17.66 |
| 15 | 48 | Brad Smith | Brad Smith Motorsports | Chevrolet | 17.911 |
| 16 | 06 | Wayne Peterson | Wayne Peterson Racing | Ford | 0.000 |
Official qualifying results

== Race ==
=== Race results ===
| Pos | Grid | No | Driver | Team | Manufacturer | Laps | Points | Status |
|---|---|---|---|---|---|---|---|---|
| 1 | 6 | 18 | Sammy Smith | Joe Gibbs Racing | Toyota | 200 | 47 | Running |
| 2 | 5 | 54 | Joey Iest | David Gilliland Racing | Ford | 200 | 42 | Running |
| 3 | 4 | 6 | Rajah Caruth | Rev Racing | Chevrolet | 199 | 41 | Running |
| 4 | 3 | 42 | Parker Retzlaff | Cook-Finley Racing | Toyota | 199 | 40 | Running |
| 5 | 9 | 91 | Justin Carroll | TC Motorsports | Toyota | 199 | 39 | Running |
| 6 | 7 | 21 | Daniel Dye | GMS Racing | Chevrolet | 199 | 38 | Running |
| 7 | 1 | 74 | Mason Diaz | Visconti Motorsports | Toyota | 199 | 40 | Running |
| 8 | 2 | 11 | Mason Mingus | Fast Track Racing | Ford | 198 | 36 | Running |
| 9 | 11 | 3 | Davey Callihan | Mullins Racing | Ford | 197 | 35 | Running |
| 10 | 8 | 30 | Max Gutierrez | Rette Jones Racing | Ford | 197 | 34 | Running |
| 11 | 10 | 8 | Ross Dalton | Empire Racing | Ford | 194 | 33 | Running |
| 12 | 12 | 41 | Morgan Alexander | Cook-Finley Racing | Chevrolet | 61 | 32 | Electrical |
| 13 | 13 | 12 | Stephanie Moyer | Fast Track Racing | Toyota | 23 | 31 | Brakes |
| 14 | 14 | 10 | Owen Smith | Fast Track Racing | Ford | 13 | 30 | Mechanical |
| 15 | 15 | 48 | Brad Smith | Brad Smith Motorsports | Chevrolet | 5 | 29 | Clutch |
| 16 | 16 | 06 | Wayne Peterson | Wayne Peterson Racing | Ford | 1 | 28 | Brakes |

| Previous race: 2021 General Tire 125 | ARCA Menards Series East; 2021 season | Next race: 2021 Shore Lunch 150 |
