= 2021 ARCA Menards Series East =

35th season of the ARCA Menards Series East

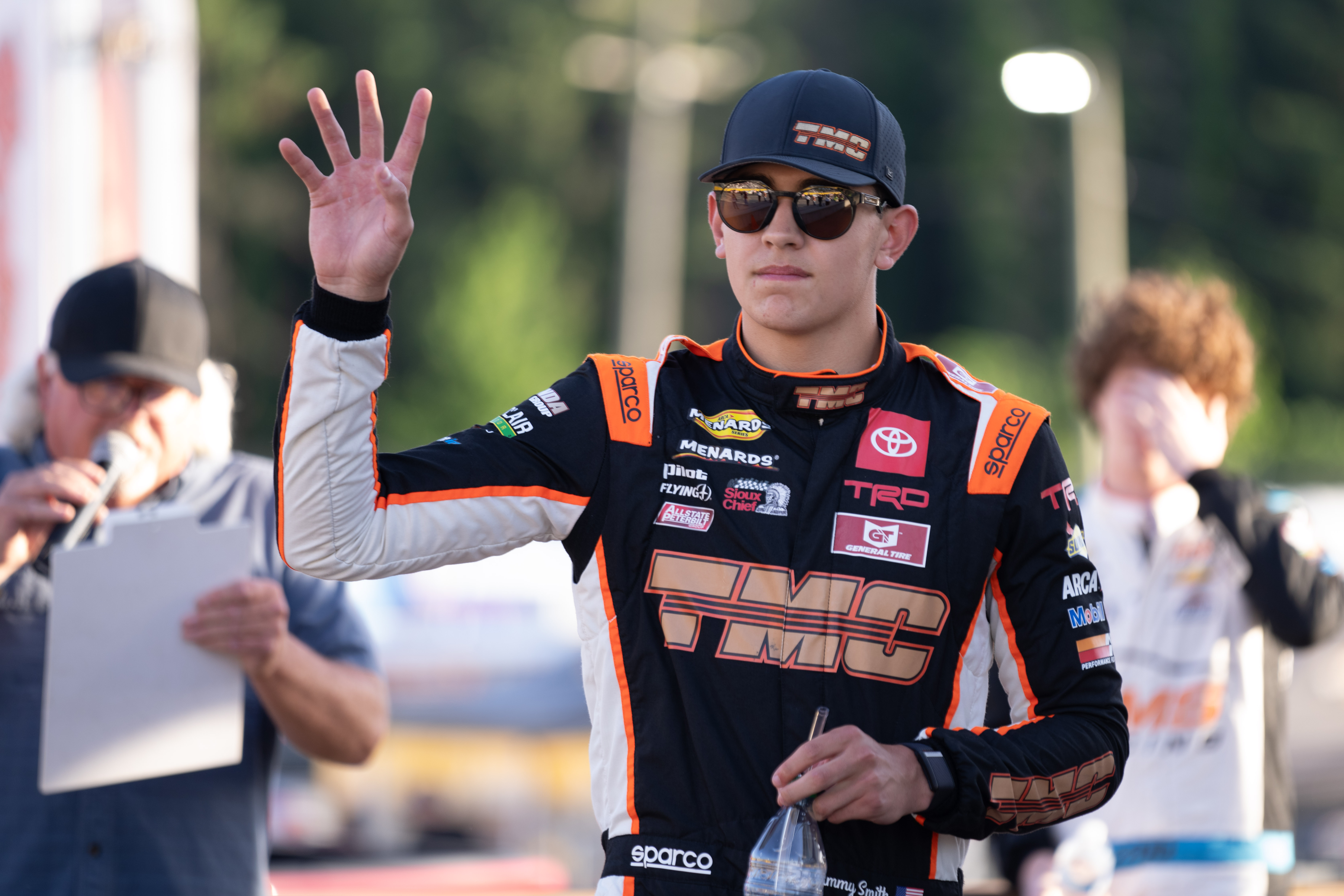
Sammy Smith, the 2021 ARCA Menards Series East champion.

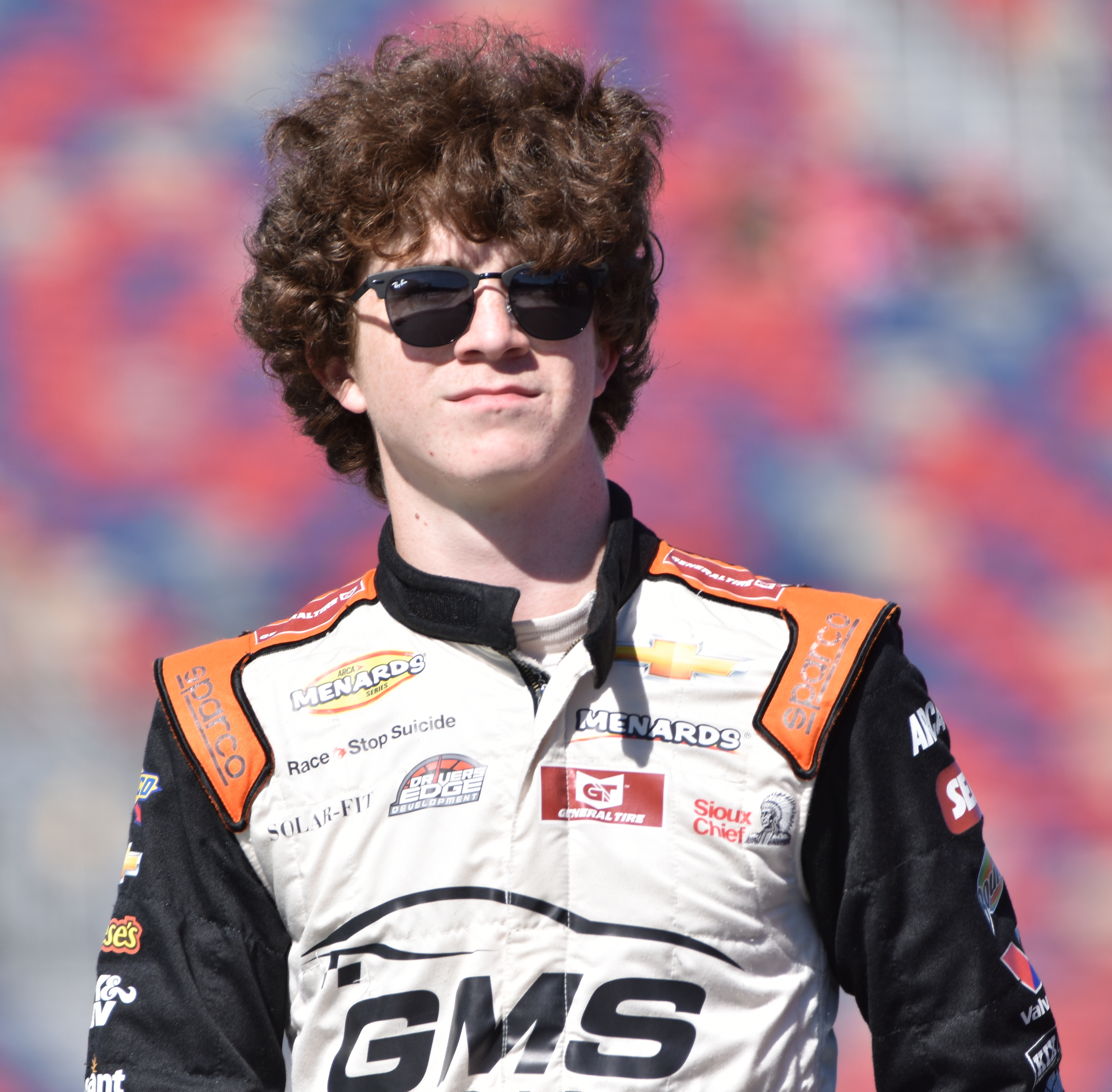
Daniel Dye finished second behind Smith in the championship by 34 points.

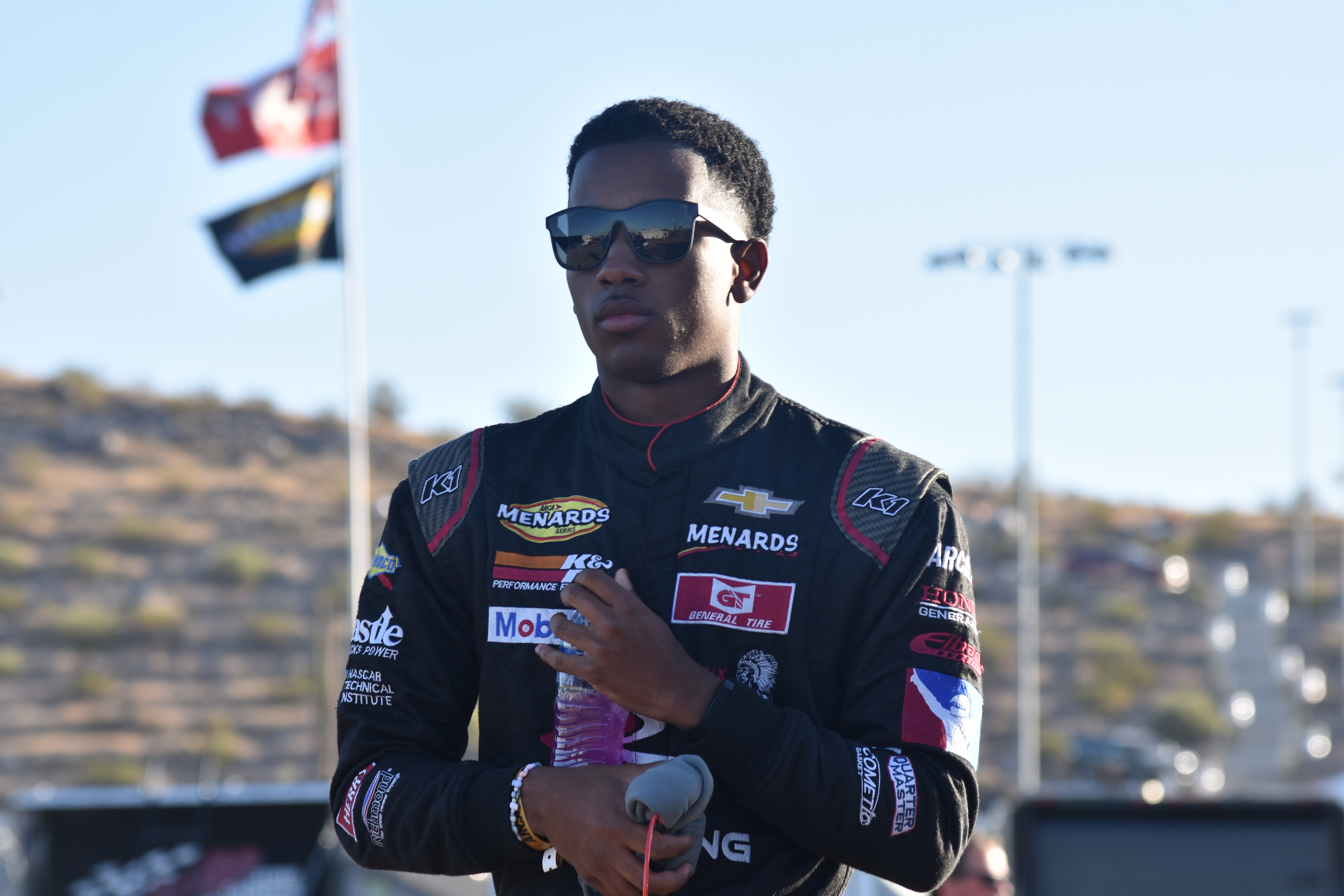
Rajah Caruth finished third in the championship.

The 2021 ARCA Menards Series East was the 35th season of the ARCA Menards Series East, a regional stock car racing series sanctioned by NASCAR in the United States. The season began on February 8 at New Smyrna Speedway with the Jeep Beach 175 and ended on September 16 at Bristol Motor Speedway with the Bush's Beans 200. Sammy Smith and Joe Gibbs Racing won the series championship. JGR's No. 18 car, driven by Smith and Ty Gibbs, won all but one race during the season.

2019 and 2020 series champion Sam Mayer did not go for a three-peat, as he moved up to the Xfinity Series in 2021, driving for JR Motorsports after his 18th birthday on June 26.

== Teams and drivers ==
Note: If a driver is listed as their own crew chief for a particular race, that means that their entry in that race was a start and park.

=== Complete schedule ===
Manufacturer	Team	No.	Driver	Crew chief
Chevrolet	Rev Racing	6	Rajah Caruth (R)	Glenn Parker
Ford	David Gilliland Racing	54	Joey Iest (R)	Derek Smith 5 Seth Smith 3
Ford	Rette Jones Racing	30	Max Gutiérrez (R)	Mark Rette
Toyota	Joe Gibbs Racing	18	Sammy Smith (R) 4 (Note: Smith ran the full season split between Joe Gibbs Racing's Nos. 18 and 81 cars.)	Mark McFarland
Toyota	Joe Gibbs Racing	18	Ty Gibbs 4	Mark McFarland
Toyota	Visconti Motorsports	74	Mason Diaz	Tommy Baldwin Jr.
Toyota 6 Chevrolet 2	Cook-Finley Racing	42	Parker Retzlaff 6	Amber Slagle 7 Sean Samuels 1
Toyota 6 Chevrolet 2	Cook-Finley Racing	42	Conner Jones 2	Amber Slagle 7 Sean Samuels 1
Toyota 6 Ford 1 Chevrolet 1	Fast Track Racing	10	Dick Doheny 3	Dick Doheny 5 Mike Sroufe 2 Trey Galgon 1
Toyota 6 Ford 1 Chevrolet 1	Fast Track Racing	10	Ed Pompa 1	Dick Doheny 5 Mike Sroufe 2 Trey Galgon 1
Toyota 6 Ford 1 Chevrolet 1	Fast Track Racing	10	Owen Smith 1	Dick Doheny 5 Mike Sroufe 2 Trey Galgon 1
Toyota 6 Ford 1 Chevrolet 1	Fast Track Racing	10	D. L. Wilson 1	Dick Doheny 5 Mike Sroufe 2 Trey Galgon 1
Toyota 6 Ford 1 Chevrolet 1	Fast Track Racing	10	Arnout Kok 1	Dick Doheny 5 Mike Sroufe 2 Trey Galgon 1
Toyota 6 Ford 1 Chevrolet 1	Fast Track Racing	10	Jade Buford 1	Dick Doheny 5 Mike Sroufe 2 Trey Galgon 1
Ford 6 Chevrolet 1 Toyota 1	Fast Track Racing	11	Richard Garvie 2	Mike Sroufe 1 Steven Barton 3 Jeff McClure 3 Tony Cosentino 1
Ford 6 Chevrolet 1 Toyota 1	Fast Track Racing	11	Mason Mingus 3	Mike Sroufe 1 Steven Barton 3 Jeff McClure 3 Tony Cosentino 1
Ford 6 Chevrolet 1 Toyota 1	Fast Track Racing	11	Jade Buford 1	Mike Sroufe 1 Steven Barton 3 Jeff McClure 3 Tony Cosentino 1
Ford 6 Chevrolet 1 Toyota 1	Fast Track Racing	11	Bryce Haugeberg 1	Mike Sroufe 1 Steven Barton 3 Jeff McClure 3 Tony Cosentino 1
Ford 6 Chevrolet 1 Toyota 1	Fast Track Racing	11	Tony Cosentino 1	Mike Sroufe 1 Steven Barton 3 Jeff McClure 3 Tony Cosentino 1

=== Limited schedule ===
Manufacturer	Team	No.	Driver	Crew chief	Rounds
Chevrolet	Ben Kennedy Racing	43	Daniel Dye (R) (Note: Dye ran the full season split between GMS Racing's No. 21 and Ben Kennedy Racing's 43.)	Glenn Garrison	4
Chevrolet	Brad Smith Motorsports	48	Brad Smith	Jeff Smith 3 Leo Kryger 1	4
Chevrolet	Bret Holmes Racing	23	Bret Holmes	Shane Huffman	1
Chevrolet	Bret Holmes Racing	23	Sam Mayer	Shane Huffman	2
Chevrolet	Cook-Finley Racing	41	Carson Kvapil	Sean Samuels	3
Chevrolet	Cook-Finley Racing	41	Josh Berry	Sean Samuels	1
Chevrolet	Cook-Finley Racing	41	Morgan Alexander	Sean Samuels	1
Chevrolet	CR7 Motorsports	97	Jason Kitzmiller	Todd Myers	1
Chevrolet	GMS Racing	21	Jack Wood	Chad Bryant	1
Chevrolet	GMS Racing	21	Conner Jones	Chad Bryant	1
Chevrolet	GMS Racing	21	Daniel Dye (R)	Chad Bryant	4
Chevrolet	GMS Racing	22	Jack Wood	Chad Walter	1
Chevrolet	Niece Motorsports	50	Morgan Alexander	Matt Weber	1
Chevrolet	Rev Racing	2	Nick Sanchez	Steve Plattenberger	3
Chevrolet	RSS Racing	28	Kyle Sieg	Jeff Green 1 Tony Wilson 1	2
Chevrolet	Young's Motorsports	02	Connor Mosack	Eddie Troconis	2
Ford	David Gilliland Racing	17	Taylor Gray	Chad Johnston	5
Ford	David Gilliland Racing	17	David Gilliland	Chad Johnston	1
Ford	David Gilliland Racing	46	Thad Moffitt	Derek Smith	3
Ford	Empire Racing	8	Ross Dalton	Derek Hartnagel	1
Ford	Greg Van Alst Motorsports	35	Greg Van Alst	Jim Long	1
Ford	Jankowiak Motorsports	73	Andy Jankowiak	Mike Dayton	1
Ford	Mullins Racing	3	Willie Mullins	Tony Furr	1
Ford	Mullins Racing	3	Davey Callihan	Tony Furr	1
Toyota	Brandon Oakley Racing	22	Brandon Oakley	Mike Bursley	1
Toyota	Fast Track Racing	12	Stephanie Moyer	Mike Sroufe	4
Toyota	Fast Track Racing	12	Dick Doheny	Dick Doheny	1
Toyota	Fast Track Racing	12	Tony Cosentino	Tony Cosentino	1
Toyota	Fast Track Racing	12	D. L. Wilson	Dick Doheny	1
Toyota	Ferrier McClure Racing	44	Stephanie Moyer (Note: Entry was fielded in a collaboration with Fast Track Racing.)	Owen Smith	1
Toyota	Jett Motorsports	09	Colt Hensley	Chris Cater	1
Toyota	Joe Gibbs Racing	81	Sammy Smith (R)	Jacob Canter 1 Jamie Jones 3	4
Toyota	TC Motorsports	91	Justin Carroll	Terry Carroll	3
Toyota	Vanco Racing	66	Ron Vandermeir Jr.	Jeff McClure	1
Toyota	Venturini Motorsports	15	Drew Dollar	Billy Venturini	3
Toyota	Venturini Motorsports	15	Jesse Love	Kevin Reed	1
Toyota	Venturini Motorsports	20	Corey Heim	Shannon Rursch	3
Toyota	Venturini Motorsports	25	Jesse Love	Kevin Reed	3
Toyota	Venturini Motorsports	25	Gracie Trotter	Billy Venturini	1
Toyota	Venturini Motorsports	55	Parker Chase	Dave Leiner Jr.	1
Toyota 1 Ford 1	CCM Racing	7	Eric Caudell	Jeremy Petty	2
Chevrolet 1 Ford 1	Charles Buchanan Racing	87	Chuck Buchanan Jr.	Jimmy Seay 1 Craig Wood 1	2
Toyota 2 Chevrolet 1	Fast Track Racing	01	Stephanie Moyer	Mike Sroufe	1
Toyota 2 Chevrolet 1	Fast Track Racing	01	Jason Miles	Owen Smith	1
Toyota 2 Chevrolet 1	Fast Track Racing	01	Richard Garvie	Tony Cosentino	1
Chevrolet 1 Toyota 2	Richmond Clubb Motorsports	27	Tim Richmond	Alex Clubb	1
Chevrolet 1 Toyota 2	Richmond Clubb Motorsports	27	Alex Clubb	Brian Clubb	1
Chevrolet 1 Toyota 2	Richmond Clubb Motorsports	27	Zachary Tinkle	Wayne Peterson	1
Chevrolet 3 Ford 1	Wayne Peterson Racing	06	Wayne Peterson	Michael Peterson	3
Chevrolet 3 Ford 1	Wayne Peterson Racing	06	Don Thompson	George Gimbert	1

=== Changes ===
==== Teams ====
- On November 13, 2020, it was announced that Lira Motorsports would be fielding a part-time entry for late model and NASCAR Roots driver Logan Misuraca. She and the team also announced that they would run part-time in the Truck Series and the big ARCA Menards Series in 2021. Her East Series schedule was going to begin at the season-opener at New Smyrna, however, Misuraca and the team ended up not attempting that race and any other races during the season. Misuraca revealed in an interview in April that her deal with Lira had fallen through.
- On January 19, 2021, Visconti Motorsports announced that Mason Diaz would drive full-time in their No. 74. In 2020, Diaz drove full-time for Venturini Motorsports, which did not field any East Series cars full-time in 2021.
- On May 14, 2021, it was announced that former JR Motorsports late model racing driver Adam Lemke would make his stock car debut in 2021, competing in select main ARCA Series, East Series, and West Series races for Rette Jones Racing. Lemke ended up only running 1 main ARCA Series race for Rette Jones and no East and West Series races. Because Max Gutiérrez drove full-time in the East Series for RJR in the No. 30, Lemke would have driven a second car for the team if he made any East Series starts.

==== Drivers ====
- On September 15, 2020, it was announced that two-time consecutive champion Sam Mayer, who drove the No. 21 car for GMS Racing, would move up to the Xfinity Series in June 2021 after he turns 18 and is eligible to race in the series. He will drive the JR Motorsports No. 8 car in the second half of the season. On November 2, 2020, GMS announced that Mayer's replacement in the No. 21 would be Jack Wood, who will drive for them full-time in the East Series as well as all of the ARCA Menards Series Showdown races. Wood previously drove part-time in the ARCA Menards Series West, fielding his own team, Velocity Racing. The team ended up changing those plans, as Wood instead began driving in the main ARCA Menards Series full-time instead of the East Series, and those plans would later fall through as well because in May, Wood was promoted to drive team's No. 24 in the Truck Series. On May 1, it was announced that Conner Jones would make his East Series debut in the GMS No. 21 at the Nashville Fairgrounds.
- On December 18, 2020, DGR-Crosley announced that Joey Iest would join the team to drive in six or more races for the team in the East Series, in addition to continuing to drive for Naake-Klauer Motorsports in the West Series. Iest ended up running the full season for the renamed David Gilliland Racing team in their No. 54 car.
- On January 8, 2021, ThePitLane revealed that Nick Sanchez would continue to compete full-time for Rev Racing in 2021, but would move from the East Series to the main ARCA Menards Series. The official announcement of this came on January 15. Rookie driver Rajah Caruth, who started his career on iRacing and then began racing real cars in 2019 and 2020 with Rev Racing in the NASCAR Advance Auto Parts Weekly Series, would replace Sanchez in the No. 6.
- On February 3, 2021, it was announced that Kyle Busch Motorsports late model racing driver Sammy Smith would move up to the East Series in 2021 and would run the first six races of the series (all of the non-combination races) in the No. 18 for Joe Gibbs Racing, replacing Ty Gibbs, who moved over to the main ARCA Series full-time in 2021 after turning 18. When Ty Gibbs returned to the East Series to compete in the race at Dover, JGR put him in the No. 18 and fielded a second car for Smith, the No. 81. Smith ended up running the full season for JGR as he also drove the No. 81 in the three combination races.
- On February 5, 2021, Rette Jones Racing announced that NASCAR Mexico Series driver Max Gutiérrez would drive their No. 30 full-time in the East Series in 2021. He made his ARCA debut in 2020, running the races at Bristol and Five Flags in the No. 53 for Troy Williams Racing.
- CARS Tour driver Carson Kvapil, the son of former NASCAR driver Travis Kvapil, made his ARCA debut in the East Series season-opener at New Smyrna in the No. 41 for Cook-Finley Racing. He would also run the next two races at Five Flags and the Nashville Fairgrounds.
- After testing for Fast Track Racing in ARCA's preseason test session at Daytona, Stephanie Moyer made her East Series debut with Fast Track at Five Flags in their No. 12 car. On March 9, 2021, Moyer tweeted that she would also drive at the Nashville Fairgrounds in the same car. She would also end up competing in the races at Southern National Motorsports Park and Milwaukee in the No. 12, Iowa in the No. 01, and Bristol in the No. 44 for Ferrier McClure Racing in a partnership with Fast Track.
- On April 8, 2021, Taylor Gray, who was scheduled to run another full season in the East Series, suffered a fractured L4 vertebra, left foot, and ankle in a single-car accident in Statesville, NC. On July 6, David Gilliland Racing announced that he had recovered and would return to complete the remainder of his scheduled starts, beginning with the main ARCA Series race at Elko.
- On May 6, 2021, it was announced that Mason Mingus would drive the No. 11 for Fast Track Racing at the Nashville Fairgrounds Speedway, his home track. This is his first start in the series since 2017. Mingus competed full-time in the main ARCA Series with Win-Tron Racing in 2013, finishing 2nd in the standings, and full-time in the Truck Series in 2014 and 2015 with Win-Tron and later Billy Boat Motorsports. He would also return to the team and drive the same car in the races at SNMP and Bristol.
- On May 10, 2021, Young's Motorsports announced that Connor Mosack, a late model driver for JR Motorsports, would make his stock car debut in their No. 02 at Dover, and would also compete in the combination race at Milwaukee.
- On June 7, 2021, GMS Racing announced that Daniel Dye would join the team in their No. 21 car to compete part-time in the main ARCA Menards Series and would also move over from his full-time ride with Ben Kennedy Racing to GMS to run the rest of the East Series schedule.

==== Crew chiefs ====
- On December 9, 2020, it was announced that defending championship-winning crew chief Mardy Lindley would be joining Kyle Busch Motorsports in the Truck Series to crew chief their No. 51. Lindley was previously the crew chief of the GMS Racing No. 21 driven by Sam Mayer, and won back-to-back championships in the series with him in 2019 and 2020. He also won two other East Series championships in 2013 and 2017. This announcement came after it had been announced that Lindley would return to GMS Racing to crew chief their new driver Jack Wood this season.

==== Manufacturers ====
- After 10 years with Toyota as their manufacturer, Rev Racing switched back to Chevy in 2021, which was their manufacturer in 2010, the team's first season.
- Visconti Motorsports switched from Chevy to Toyota in 2021.

== Schedule ==
New Smyrna, Five Flags, and Dover revealed their race dates ahead of the release of the entire schedule, which ARCA announced on December 18, 2020.

Note: Races highlighted in gold were combination events with the ARCA Menards Series.

No	Race title	Track	Date
1	Jeep Beach 175	New Smyrna Speedway, New Smyrna Beach, Florida	February 8
2	Pensacola 200	Five Flags Speedway, Pensacola, Florida	February 27
3	Crosley Record Pressing 200	Fairgrounds Speedway, Nashville, Tennessee	May 8
4	General Tire 125	Dover International Speedway, Dover, Delaware	May 14
5	Southern National 200 presented by Solid Rock Carriers	Southern National Motorsports Park, Kenly, North Carolina	June 12
6	Shore Lunch 150	Iowa Speedway, Newton, Iowa	July 24
7	Sprecher 150	Milwaukee Mile, West Allis, Wisconsin	August 29
8	Bush's Beans 200	Bristol Motor Speedway, Bristol, Tennessee	September 16

== Results and standings ==
=== Race results ===
No.	Race	Pole position	Most laps led	Winning driver	Manufacturer	No.	Winning team
1	Jeep Beach 175	Taylor Gray	Sammy Smith	Max Gutiérrez	Ford	30	Rette Jones Racing
2	Pensacola 200	Sammy Smith	Sammy Smith	Sammy Smith	Toyota	18	Joe Gibbs Racing
3	Crosley Record Pressing 200	Mason Mingus	Sammy Smith	Sammy Smith	Toyota	18	Joe Gibbs Racing
4	General Tire 125	Ty Gibbs	Ty Gibbs (Note: Gibbs led all of the laps in the race.)	Ty Gibbs	Toyota	18	Joe Gibbs Racing
5	Southern National 200 presented by Solid Rock Carriers	Mason Diaz	Mason Diaz	Sammy Smith	Toyota	18	Joe Gibbs Racing
6	Shore Lunch 150	Ty Gibbs	Ty Gibbs	Ty Gibbs	Toyota	18	Joe Gibbs Racing
7	Sprecher 150	Ty Gibbs	Ty Gibbs	Ty Gibbs	Toyota	18	Joe Gibbs Racing
8	Bush's Beans 200	Ty Gibbs	Ty Gibbs	Ty Gibbs	Toyota	18	Joe Gibbs Racing

=== Drivers' championship ===
Notes:

- The pole winner also receives one bonus point, similar to the previous ARCA points system used until 2019 and unlike NASCAR.
- Additionally, after groups of five races of the season, drivers that compete in all five races receive fifty additional points.
  - After the fifth race of the season at Southern National Motorsports Park, Sammy Smith, Mason Diaz, Joey Iest, Max Gutiérrez, Daniel Dye, Parker Retzlaff, and Rajah Caruth received this points bonus for having competed in the first five races of the season (New Smyrna, Five Flags, Nashville Fairgrounds, Dover, and SNMP).

(key) Bold – Pole position awarded by time. Italics – Pole position set by final practice results or rainout. * – Most laps led. ** – All laps led.

Pos	Driver	NSM	FIF	NSV	DOV	SNM	IOW	MIL	BRI	Points
1	Sammy Smith **(R)**	2*	**1***	1*	4	1	18	5	2	435
2	Daniel Dye **(R)**	6	9	8	6	6	2	3	12	401
3	Rajah Caruth **(R)**	11	4	6	14	3	9	13	6	386
4	Max Gutiérrez **(R)**	1	7	9	5	10	12	15	14	383
5	Joey Iest **(R)**	5	5	5	8	2	20	8	19	380
6	Mason Diaz	4	2	2	11	**7***	8	19	31	373
7	Parker Retzlaff	9	6	7	12	4		11		266
8	Taylor Gray	**3**	3				3	4	3	258
9	Ty Gibbs				**1****		**1***	**1****	**1***	246
10	Stephanie Moyer		8	10		13	23	20	27	213
11	Jesse Love				18		7	7	7	182
12	Corey Heim						4	6	5	167
13	Nick Sanchez						5	12	4	161
14	Brad Smith					15	19	22	24	146
15	Thad Moffitt						6	9	25	143
16	Dick Doheny	15	12	12	15					122
17	Mason Mingus			**3**		8			17	106
18	Conner Jones			4			21		10	97
19	Drew Dollar				16		11		8	97
20	Carson Kvapil	14	11	11						96
21	Justin Carroll				17	5			16	94
22	Wayne Peterson		13	13		16				90
23	Richard Garvie	12	10						23	87
24	Connor Mosack				7			16		65
25	Kyle Sieg				13				11	64
26	Jack Wood	13							13	62
27	Jade Buford				9				18	61
28	Morgan Alexander					12	15			61
29	Sam Mayer							2	29	57
30	Eric Caudell						14	21		53
31	D. L. Wilson						16		28	44
32	Tony Cosentino						22	23		43
33	Josh Berry				2					42
34	David Gilliland				3					41
35	Colt Hensley	7								37
36	Brandon Oakley	8								36
37	Davey Callihan					9				35
38	Parker Chase								9	35
39	Willie Mullins	10								34
40	Ed Pompa				10					34
41	Bret Holmes						10			34
42	Gracie Trotter							10		34
43	Ross Dalton					11				33
44	Tim Richmond						13			31
45	Owen Smith					14				30
46	Ron Vandermeir Jr.							14		30
47	Greg Van Alst								15	29
48	Bryce Haugeberg						17			27
49	Alex Clubb							17		27
50	Chuck Buchanan Jr.	DNS							21	26
51	Jason Miles							18		26
52	Zachary Tinkle								20	24
53	Jason Kitzmiller								22	22
54	Andy Jankowiak								26	18
55	Don Thompson								30	14
56	Arnout Kok							DNS		3

== See also ==
- 2021 NASCAR Cup Series
- 2021 NASCAR Xfinity Series
- 2021 NASCAR Camping World Truck Series
- 2021 ARCA Menards Series
- 2021 ARCA Menards Series West
- 2021 NASCAR Whelen Modified Tour
- 2021 NASCAR Pinty's Series
- 2021 NASCAR Whelen Euro Series
- 2021 eNASCAR iRacing Pro Invitational Series
- 2021 SRX Series
- 2021 Southern Modified Auto Racing Teams season
