= Morgan Alexander (racing driver) =

American racing driver

- Born: Morgan M. Alexander; April 10, 1997 (age 29); Griffin, Georgia, U.S.

NASCAR FedEx Freight Truck Series career
- 1 race run over 1 year
- 2021 position: 92nd
- Best finish: 92nd (2021)
- First race: 2021 Corn Belt 150 (Knoxville)
Wins	Top tens	Poles
0	0	0
- Statistics up to date as of May 17, 2023.

Morgan M. Alexander (born April 10, 1997) is an American professional dirt track racing and stock car racing driver who competes part-time in Dirt Super Late Models and 604 Crate Dirt Late Models, driving the No. 711 Savage Racecars for Morgan Alexander Racing. He has also previously competed in the NASCAR Craftsman Truck Series and ARCA Menards Series.

== Racing career ==
Alexander began racing at the age of thirteen in dirt late models before transitioning to racing on asphalt in stock cars. Alexander made his ARCA Menards Series East debut in the race at Southern National Motorsports Park. He was initially going to drive the No. 50 for Niece Motorsports, but that car ended up being withdrawn and Alexander moved to the No. 41 for Cook-Finley Racing, which had previously been TBA on the entry list. He finished twelfth out of sixteen cars after suffering electrical problems. Alexander was also scheduled to make his ARCA Menards Series West debut in the race at Irwindale in Cook-Finley's No. 42 car, but he cancelled that planned start and instead used the funding for that race to compete in the NASCAR Camping World Truck Series race at Knoxville with Niece in their No. 44 truck. Alexander did drive the No. 50 for Niece in two races in back-to-back weeks in July: the main ARCA Menards Series race at Berlin and the main ARCA/East Series combination race at Iowa. Alexander crashed in his truck debut at Knoxville with Jessica Friesen.

== Personal life ==
He is not related to former NASCAR drivers Blaise Alexander and Mike Alexander or NASCAR on Fox Xfinity Series play-by-play announcer Adam Alexander.

== Motorsports career results ==
=== NASCAR ===
(key) (Bold – Pole position awarded by qualifying time. Italics – Pole position earned by points standings or practice time. * – Most laps led.)

==== Camping World Truck Series ====
NASCAR Camping World Truck Series results
Year	Team	No.	Make	1	2	3	4	5	6	7	8	9	10	11	12	13	14	15	16	17	18	19	20	21	22	NCWTC	Pts	Ref
2021	Niece Motorsports	44	Chevy	DAY	DAY	LVS	ATL	BRI	RCH	KAN	DAR	COA	CLT	TEX	NSH	POC	KNX; 40	GLN	GTW	DAR	BRI	LVS	TAL	MAR	PHO	92nd	1	

=== ARCA Menards Series ===
(key) (Bold – Pole position awarded by qualifying time. Italics – Pole position earned by points standings or practice time. * – Most laps led.)

ARCA Menards Series results
Year	Team	No.	Make	1	2	3	4	5	6	7	8	9	10	11	12	13	14	15	16	17	18	19	20	AMSC	Pts	Ref
2021	Niece Motorsports	50	Chevy	DAY	PHO	TAL	KAN	TOL	CLT	MOH	POC	ELK	BLN; 10	IOW; 15	WIN	GLN	MCH	ISF	MLW	DSF	BRI	SLM	KAN	59th	63	

==== ARCA Menards Series East ====
ARCA Menards Series East results
Year	Team	No.	Make	1	2	3	4	5	6	7	8	AMSEC	Pts	Ref
2021	Cook-Finley Racing	41	Chevy	NSM	FIF	NSV	DOV	SNM; 12				28th	61	
2021	Niece Motorsports	50	Chevy						IOW; 15	MLW	BRI	28th	61	

^{*} Season still in progress
