= Owen Smith (racing driver) =

American racing driver (born 2000)

- Born: March 6, 2000 (age 26) Louisa, Virginia, U.S.

ARCA Menards Series career
- Debut season: 2020
- Starts: 19
- Championships: 0
- Wins: 0
- Podiums: 0
- Poles: 0
- Best finish: 12th in 2021
- Statistics up to date as of March 8, 2022.

Owen Smith (born March 6, 2000) is an American professional stock car racing driver and crew chief who has previously competed in the ARCA Menards Series, primarily driving for Fast Track Racing.

== Racing career ==
Smith's interest in racing began when he was in sixth grade, during which his father brought him to Southside Speedway. He made his racing debut at the age of thirteen at Shenandoah Speedway. In 2016, he started competing in the NASCAR Whelen All-American Series and finished in the top 500 in the national standings. He repeated the placement from 2017 to 2019.

As a student at the University of Northwestern Ohio, Smith joined the Over the Wall Club which allowed him to connect with those within the racing industry. In 2019, he became a crewman for Fast Track Racing and worked on the pit crew for driver Tommy Vigh Jr. In July, he began driving for the team beginning at Toledo Speedway, where he exited after completing five laps with electrical issues. As a start and park entry, he also worked as a crew chief for his own car.

In 2021, he replaced Brad Smith (of no relation) in the No. 48 for the season opener at Daytona International Speedway after Brad suffered retinal detachment while chipping ice.

== Personal life ==
Smith graduated from Louisa County High School in 2018.

== Motorsports career results ==
=== ARCA Menards Series ===
(key) (Bold – Pole position awarded by qualifying time. Italics – Pole position earned by points standings or practice time. * – Most laps led.)

ARCA Menards Series results
| Year | Team | No. | Make | 1 | 2 | 3 | 4 | 5 | 6 | 7 | 8 | 9 | 10 | 11 | 12 | 13 | 14 | 15 | 16 | 17 | 18 | 19 | 20 | AMSC | Pts | Ref |
|---|---|---|---|---|---|---|---|---|---|---|---|---|---|---|---|---|---|---|---|---|---|---|---|---|---|---|
| 2020 | Fast Track Racing | 11 | Chevy | DAY | PHO | TAL | POC | IRP | KEN | IOW | KAN | TOL; 16 | TOL; 16 | MCH | DAY | | | | | | | | KAN; 16 | 15th | 247 | |
| 2020 | Fast Track Racing | 10 | Chevy | | | | | | | | | | | | | GTW; 21 | | TOL; 18 | | | | | | 15th | 247 | |
| 2020 | Fast Track Racing | 11 | Ford | | | | | | | | | | | | | | L44; 12 | | BRI; 22 | | | | | 15th | 247 | |
| 2020 | Fast Track Racing | 12 | Toyota | | | | | | | | | | | | | | | | | WIN; 13 | MEM | | | 15th | 247 | |
| 2020 | Fast Track Racing | 12 | Chevy | | | | | | | | | | | | | | | | | | | ISF; 15 | | 15th | 247 | |
| 2021 | Brad Smith Motorsports | 48 | Chevy | DAY; 33 | PHO | TAL | | | | | | | | | | | | | | | | | | 12th | 273 | |
| 2021 | Fast Track Racing | 01 | Ford | | | | KAN; 18 | TOL; 14 | CLT; 17 | MOH; 14 | POC | ELK; 16 | | | WIN; 17 | GLN | MCH | | | | | | | 12th | 273 | |
| 2021 | Fast Track Racing | 10 | Toyota | | | | | | | | | | BLN; 9 | IOW | | | | | | | | | | 12th | 273 | |
| 2021 | Fast Track Racing | 01 | Toyota | | | | | | | | | | | | | | | ISF; 16 | MLW | | | | | 12th | 273 | |
| 2021 | Fast Track Racing | 11 | Ford | | | | | | | | | | | | | | | | | DSF; 13 | BRI | SLM | KAN | 12th | 273 | |

==== ARCA Menards Series East ====
ARCA Menards Series East results
| Year | Team | No. | Make | 1 | 2 | 3 | 4 | 5 | 6 | 7 | 8 | AMSEC | Pts | Ref |
|---|---|---|---|---|---|---|---|---|---|---|---|---|---|---|
| 2020 | Fast Track Racing | 10 | Chevy | NSM | TOL | DOV | TOL; 18 | | | | | 30th | 48 | |
| 2020 | Fast Track Racing | 11 | Ford | | | | | BRI; 22 | FIF | | | 30th | 48 | |
| 2021 | Fast Track Racing | 10 | Ford | NSM | FIF | NSV | DOV | SNM; 14 | IOW | MLW | BRI | 45th | 30 | |
