= 2020 Dutch Boy 150 =

Race details
- Race 13 of 20 of the 2020 ARCA Menards Series; Race 7 of 10 of the 2020 Sioux Chief Showdown
- Date: August 29, 2020
- Official name: 9th Annual Dutch Boy 150
- Location: Madison, Illinois, World Wide Technology Raceway
- Course: Permanent racing facility
- Course length: 1.25 miles (2.01 km)
- Distance: 120 laps, 150 mi (241.402 km)
- Scheduled distance: 120 laps, 150 mi (241.402 km)
- Average speed: 96.809 miles per hour (155.799 km/h)

Pole position
Driver	Michael Self	Venturini Motorsports
- Time: Set by 2020 Sioux Chief Showdown owner's points

Most laps led
Driver	Ty Gibbs	Joe Gibbs Racing
- Laps: 109

Winner
No. 18	Ty Gibbs	Joe Gibbs Racing

Television in the United States
- Network: MAVTV
- Announcers: Bob Dillner, Jim Tretow

Radio in the United States
- Radio: Motor Racing Network

The 2020 Dutch Boy 150 was the 13th stock car race of the 2020 ARCA Menards Series, the seventh race of the 2020 Sioux Chief Showdown, and the ninth iteration of the event. The race was held on Saturday, August 29, 2020, in Madison, Illinois at Gateway Motorsports Park, a 1.25 miles (2.01 km) permanent oval-shaped racetrack. The race took the scheduled 120 laps to complete. At race's end, Ty Gibbs of Joe Gibbs Racing would dominate and win his sixth career ARCA Menards Series win and his fourth of the season. To fill out the podium, Chandler Smith of Venturini Motorsports and Sam Mayer of GMS Racing would finish second and third, respectively.

== Background ==
Known as Gateway Motorsports Park until its renaming in April 2019, World Wide Technology Raceway is a 1.25-mile (2.01 km) paved oval motor racing track in Madison, Illinois, United States. The track previously held Truck races from 1998 to 2010, and returned starting in 2014.

=== Entry list ===
#	Driver	Team	Make	Sponsor
1	Max McLaughlin	Hattori Racing Enterprises	Toyota	NAPA Belts & Hoses, Gates Hydraulics
4	Hailie Deegan	DGR-Crosley	Ford	Monster Energy
4E	Chase Cabre	Rev Racing	Toyota	Eibach, Max Siegel Incorporated
6	Nick Sanchez	Rev Racing	Toyota	Universal Technical Institute, NASCAR Technical Institute
06	Tim Richmond	Wayne Peterson Racing	Toyota	Immigration Legal Center, Great Railing
10	Owen Smith	Fast Track Racing	Chevrolet	Fast Track Racing
11	Mike Basham	Fast Track Racing	Toyota	Green Renewable Inc., Double "H" Ranch
12	Max Calles	Fast Track Racing	Toyota	G3 Trading Company
15	Drew Dollar	Venturini Motorsports	Toyota	Sunbelt Rentals
16	Gio Scelzi	Bill McAnally Racing	Toyota	NAPA Auto Parts
17	Taylor Gray	DGR-Crosley	Ford	Ford Performance
18	Ty Gibbs	Joe Gibbs Racing	Toyota	Monster Energy
19	Jesse Love	Bill McAnally Racing	Toyota	NAPA Power Premium Plus
20	Chandler Smith	Venturini Motorsports	Toyota	JBL
21	Sam Mayer	GMS Racing	Chevrolet	QPS Employment Group
22	Kris Wright	Chad Bryant Racing	Chevrolet	Mastertech, FNB Corporation
23	Bret Holmes	Bret Holmes Racing	Chevrolet	Holmes II Excavating
25	Michael Self	Venturini Motorsports	Toyota	Sinclair
41	Kyle Sieg	Cook-Finley Racing	Chevrolet	Steri-Clean
48	Brad Smith	Brad Smith Motorsports	Chevrolet	Henshaw Automation
99	Gracie Trotter	Bill McAnally Racing	Toyota	Eneos
Official entry list

== Practice ==
The only 30-minute practice session was held on Saturday, August 29. Ty Gibbs of Joe Gibbs Racing would set the fastest time in the session, with a lap of 33.558 and an average speed of 134.096 miles per hour (215.807 km/h).

Pos.	#	Driver	Team	Make	Time	Speed
1	18	Ty Gibbs	Joe Gibbs Racing	Toyota	33.558	134.096
2	25	Michael Self	Venturini Motorsports	Toyota	33.620	133.849
3	21	Sam Mayer	GMS Racing	Chevrolet	33.899	132.747
Full practice results

== Starting lineup ==
ARCA would not hold qualifying for the event, and would decide to determine the starting lineup based on the current 2020 Sioux Chief Showdown owner's standings. As a result, Michael Self of Venturini Motorsports would win the pole.

Pos.	#	Driver	Team	Make
1	25	Michael Self	Venturini Motorsports	Toyota
2	20	Chandler Smith	Venturini Motorsports	Toyota
3	21	Sam Mayer	GMS Racing	Chevrolet
4	17	Taylor Gray	DGR-Crosley	Ford
5	18	Ty Gibbs	Joe Gibbs Racing	Toyota
6	23	Bret Holmes	Bret Holmes Racing	Chevrolet
7	4	Hailie Deegan	DGR-Crosley	Ford
8	22	Kris Wright	Chad Bryant Racing	Chevrolet
9	15	Drew Dollar	Venturini Motorsports	Toyota
10	12	Max Calles	Fast Track Racing	Toyota
11	11	Mike Basham	Fast Track Racing	Toyota
12	10	Owen Smith	Fast Track Racing	Chevrolet
13	06	Tim Richmond	Wayne Peterson Racing	Toyota
14	48	Brad Smith	Brad Smith Motorsports	Chevrolet
15	1	Max McLaughlin	Hattori Racing Enterprises	Toyota
16	16	Gio Scelzi	Bill McAnally Racing	Toyota
17	19	Jesse Love	Bill McAnally Racing	Toyota
18	99	Gracie Trotter	Bill McAnally Racing	Toyota
19	6	Nick Sanchez	Rev Racing	Toyota
20	4E	Chase Cabre	Rev Racing	Toyota
21	41	Kyle Sieg	Cook-Finley Racing	Chevrolet
Official starting lineup

== Race results ==
Fin	St	#	Driver	Team	Make	Laps	Led	Status	Pts
1	5	18	Ty Gibbs	Joe Gibbs Racing	Toyota	120	109	running	48
2	2	20	Chandler Smith	Venturini Motorsports	Toyota	120	0	running	42
3	3	21	Sam Mayer	GMS Racing	Chevrolet	120	0	running	41
4	15	1	Max McLaughlin	Hattori Racing Enterprises	Toyota	120	0	running	40
5	17	19	Jesse Love	Bill McAnally Racing	Toyota	120	0	running	39
6	6	23	Bret Holmes	Bret Holmes Racing	Chevrolet	120	0	running	38
7	9	15	Drew Dollar	Venturini Motorsports	Toyota	120	0	running	37
8	4	17	Taylor Gray	DGR-Crosley	Ford	120	0	running	36
9	7	4	Hailie Deegan	DGR-Crosley	Ford	120	0	running	35
10	20	4E	Chase Cabre	Rev Racing	Toyota	120	0	running	34
11	21	41	Kyle Sieg	Cook-Finley Racing	Chevrolet	120	0	running	33
12	18	99	Gracie Trotter	Bill McAnally Racing	Toyota	120	0	running	32
13	16	16	Gio Scelzi	Bill McAnally Racing	Toyota	119	0	running	31
14	19	6	Nick Sanchez	Rev Racing	Toyota	117	0	running	30
15	1	25	Michael Self	Venturini Motorsports	Toyota	115	11	running	30
16	13	06	Tim Richmond	Wayne Peterson Racing	Toyota	115	0	running	28
17	10	12	Max Calles	Fast Track Racing	Toyota	114	0	running	27
18	8	22	Kris Wright	Chad Bryant Racing	Chevrolet	109	0	running	26
19	14	48	Brad Smith	Brad Smith Motorsports	Chevrolet	109	0	running	25
20	11	11	Mike Basham	Fast Track Racing	Toyota	11	0	vibration	24
21	12	10	Owen Smith	Fast Track Racing	Chevrolet	7	0	brakes	23
Official race results

Previous race: 2020 General Tire 100	ARCA Menards Series; 2020 season	Next race: 2020 Zinsser SmartCoat 200
