= 2020 Zinsser SmartCoat 200 =

Race details
- Race 14 of 20 of the 2020 ARCA Menards Series; Race 8 of 10 of the 2020 Sioux Chief Showdown
- Date: September 5, 2020
- Official name: Inaugural Zinsser SmartCoat 200
- Location: Lebanon, Missouri, Lebanon I-44 Speedway
- Course: Permanent racing facility
- Course length: 0.375 miles (0.604 km)
- Distance: 200 laps, 75 mi (120.701 km)
- Scheduled distance: 200 laps, 75 mi (120.701 km)
- Average speed: 55.627 miles per hour (89.523 km/h)

Pole position
Driver	Bret Holmes	Bret Holmes Racing
- Time: 14.812

Most laps led
Driver	Hailie Deegan	DGR-Crosley
- Laps: 85

Winner
No. 21	Sam Mayer	GMS Racing

Television in the United States
- Network: MAVTV
- Announcers: Bob Dillner, Jim Tretow

Radio in the United States
- Radio: ARCA Racing Network

The 2020 Zinsser SmartCoat 200 was the 14th stock car race of the 2020 ARCA Menards Series, the eighth race of the 2020 Sioux Chief Showdown, and the inaugural iteration of the event. The race was held on Saturday, September 5, 2020, in Lebanon, Missouri, at Lebanon I-44 Speedway, a 0.375 miles (0.604 km) permanent oval-shaped racetrack. The race took the scheduled 200 laps to complete. At race's end, Sam Mayer of GMS Racing would take over the lead from a dominating Hailie Deegan near the end of the race to win his third career ARCA Menards Series win and his third of the season. To fill out the podium, Bret Holmes of Bret Holmes Racing and Taylor Gray of DGR-Crosley would finish second and third, respectively.

== Background ==
Lebanon I-44 Speedway is a multi-purpose speedway located in Ozark hills just off Interstate 44 outside Lebanon, Missouri. The Speedway's main 3/8 mile oval has been holding races since 1982.

=== Entry list ===
#	Driver	Team	Make	Sponsor
4	Hailie Deegan	DGR-Crosley	Ford	Monster Energy
06	Tim Richmond	Wayne Peterson Racing	Toyota	Wayne Peterson Racing
10	Tim Monroe	Fast Track Racing	Chevrolet	Fast Track Racing
11	Owen Smith	Fast Track Racing	Ford	Fast Track Racing
12	Mike Basham	Fast Track Racing	Toyota	Fast Track Racing
15	Drew Dollar	Venturini Motorsports	Toyota	Sunbelt Rentals
17	Taylor Gray	DGR-Crosley	Ford	Ford Performance
18	Ty Gibbs	Joe Gibbs Racing	Toyota	Monster Energy
20	Chandler Smith	Venturini Motorsports	Toyota	JBL
21	Sam Mayer	GMS Racing	Chevrolet	With Us Foundation
22	Kris Wright	Chad Bryant Racing	Chevrolet	Mastertech, FNB Corporation
23	Bret Holmes	Bret Holmes Racing	Chevrolet	Holmes II Excavating
25	Michael Self	Venturini Motorsports	Toyota	Sinclair
48	Brad Smith	Brad Smith Motorsports	Chevrolet	Henshaw Automation
Official entry list

== Practice ==
The only practice session was held on Saturday, September 5. Hailie Deegan of DGR-Crosley would set the fastest time in the session, with a lap of 14.964 and an average speed of 90.217 miles per hour (145.190 km/h).

Pos.	#	Driver	Team	Make	Time	Speed
1	4	Hailie Deegan	DGR-Crosley	Ford	14.964	90.217
2	18	Ty Gibbs	Joe Gibbs Racing	Toyota	15.130	89.227
3	21	Sam Mayer	GMS Racing	Chevrolet	15.212	88.746
Full practice results

== Qualifying ==
Qualifying was held on Saturday, September 5, at 6:00 p.m. EST. Each driver would have two laps to set a fastest time; the fastest of the two would count as their official qualifying lap.

Bret Holmes of Bret Holmes Racing would win the pole, setting a time of 14.812 and an average speed of 91.142 miles per hour (146.679 km/h). It was Holmes' first ever career pole in the series.

=== Full qualifying results ===
Pos.	#	Driver	Team	Make	Time	Speed
1	23	Bret Holmes	Bret Holmes Racing	Chevrolet	14.812	91.142
2	20	Chandler Smith	Venturini Motorsports	Toyota	14.861	90.842
3	4	Hailie Deegan	DGR-Crosley	Ford	14.880	90.726
4	18	Ty Gibbs	Joe Gibbs Racing	Toyota	14.892	90.653
5	25	Michael Self	Venturini Motorsports	Toyota	14.933	90.404
6	17	Taylor Gray	DGR-Crosley	Ford	14.943	90.343
7	21	Sam Mayer	GMS Racing	Chevrolet	14.955	90.271
8	15	Drew Dollar	Venturini Motorsports	Toyota	15.124	89.262
9	22	Kris Wright	Chad Bryant Racing	Chevrolet	15.348	87.959
10	12	Mike Basham	Fast Track Racing	Toyota	15.903	84.890
11	06	Tim Richmond	Wayne Peterson Racing	Toyota	16.409	82.272
12	48	Brad Smith	Brad Smith Motorsports	Chevrolet	17.164	78.653
13	11	Owen Smith	Fast Track Racing	Ford	17.235	78.329
14	10	Tim Monroe	Fast Track Racing	Chevrolet	17.457	77.333
Official qualifying results

== Race results ==
Fin	St	#	Driver	Team	Make	Laps	Led	Status	Pts
1	6	21	Sam Mayer	GMS Racing	Chevrolet	200	46	running	47
2	1	23	Bret Holmes	Bret Holmes Racing	Chevrolet	200	69	running	43
3	7	17	Taylor Gray	DGR-Crosley	Ford	200	0	running	41
4	4	18	Ty Gibbs	Joe Gibbs Racing	Toyota	200	0	running	40
5	3	4	Hailie Deegan	DGR-Crosley	Ford	200	85	running	41
6	5	25	Michael Self	Venturini Motorsports	Toyota	199	0	running	38
7	9	22	Kris Wright	Chad Bryant Racing	Chevrolet	198	0	running	37
8	2	20	Chandler Smith	Venturini Motorsports	Toyota	198	0	running	36
9	8	15	Drew Dollar	Venturini Motorsports	Toyota	194	0	running	35
10	10	12	Mike Basham	Fast Track Racing	Toyota	193	0	running	34
11	11	06	Tim Richmond	Wayne Peterson Racing	Toyota	190	0	running	33
12	13	11	Owen Smith	Fast Track Racing	Ford	39	0	brakes	32
13	12	48	Brad Smith	Brad Smith Motorsports	Chevrolet	35	0	handling	31
14	14	10	Tim Monroe	Fast Track Racing	Chevrolet	4	0	brakes	30
Official race results

Previous race: 2020 Dutch Boy 150	ARCA Menards Series; 2020 season	Next race: 2020 Royal Truck & Trailer 200
