= 2020 Illinois Truck & Equipment Allen Crowe 100 =

Race details
- Race 19 of 20 of the 2020 ARCA Menards Series
- Date: October 4, 2020
- Official name: 38th Annual Illinois Truck & Equipment Allen Crowe 100
- Location: Springfield, Illinois, Illinois State Fairgrounds Racetrack
- Course: Permanent racing facility
- Course length: 1 miles (1.6 km)
- Distance: 103 laps, 103 mi (166 km)
- Scheduled distance: 100 laps, 100 mi (160 km)
- Average speed: 63.169 miles per hour (101.661 km/h)

Pole position
Driver	Ryan Unzicker	Hendren Motorsports
- Time: 34.047

Most laps led
Driver	Ryan Unzicker	Hendren Motorsports
- Laps: 102

Winner
No. 24	Ryan Unzicker	Hendren Motorsports

Television in the United States
- Network: MAVTV
- Nielsen ratings: Bob Dillner, Jim Tretow

Radio in the United States
- Radio: ARCA Racing Network

The 2020 Illinois Truck & Equipment Allen Crowe 100 was the 19th stock car race of the 2020 ARCA Menards Series and the 38th iteration of the event. The race was held on Sunday, October 4, 2020, in Springfield, Illinois at the Illinois State Fairgrounds Racetrack, a 1 mile (1.6 km) permanent clay oval-shaped track at the Illinois State Fair. The race was extended from its scheduled 100 laps to 103 laps due to a NASCAR overtime finish. At race's end, a dominating Ryan Unzicker of Hendren Motorsports would hold off the field on the final restart to win his first and only win of the season. To fill out the podium, Hailie Deegan of DGR-Crosley and Bret Holmes of Bret Holmes Racing would finish second and third respectively.

== Background ==
Illinois State Fairgrounds Racetrack is a one mile long clay oval motor racetrack on the Illinois State Fairgrounds in Springfield, the state capital. It is frequently nicknamed The Springfield Mile. Constructed in the late 19th century and reconstructed in 1927, the track has hosted competitive auto racing since 1910, making it one of the oldest speedways in the United States. The original mile track utilized the current frontstretch and the other side was behind the current grandstands and the straightaways were connected by tight turns. It is the oldest track to continually host national championship dirt track racing, holding its first national championship race in 1934 under the American Automobile Association banner. It is the home of five world records for automobile racing, making it one of the fastest dirt tracks in the world. Since 1993, the venue is managed by Bob Sargent's Track Enterprises.

=== Entry list ===
#	Driver	Team	Make	Sponsor
0	Wayne Peterson	Wayne Peterson Racing	Chevrolet	Wayne Peterson Racing
01	Alex Clubb*	Fast Track Racing	Ford	A. Clubb Lawn Care & Landscaping
4	Hailie Deegan	DGR-Crosley	Ford	Monster Energy
06	Tim Richmond	Wayne Peterson Racing	Toyota	Great Railing
7	Eric Caudell	CCM Racing	Ford	CCM Racing
10	Mike Basham	Fast Track Racing	Toyota	Green Renewable, Inc., Double "H" Ranch
11	Tim Monroe	Fast Track Racing	Toyota	Fast Track Racing
12	Owen Smith	Fast Track Racing	Chevrolet	Fast Track Racing
15	Drew Dollar	Venturini Motorsports	Toyota	Sunbelt Rentals
16	Kelly Kovski	Allgaier Motorsports	Chevrolet	Schluckebeier Farms, Schnapp Sewer Services
17	Taylor Gray	DGR-Crosley	Ford	Ford Performance
18	Ty Gibbs	Joe Gibbs Racing	Toyota	Monster Energy
20	Corey Heim	Venturini Motorsports	Toyota	Craftsman
23	Bret Holmes	Bret Holmes Racing	Chevrolet	Holmes II Excavating
24	Ryan Unzicker	Hendren Motorsports	Chevrolet	RJR Transportation Co.
25	Michael Self	Venturini Motorsports	Toyota	Sinclair
48	Brad Smith	Brad Smith Motorsports	Chevrolet	Henshaw Automation
69	Will Kimmel	Kimmel Racing	Ford	Valvoline
Official entry list

*Withdrew.

== Practice ==
The only 30-minute practice session was held on Sunday, October 4. Corey Heim of Venturini Motorsports would set the fastest time in the session, with a lap of 35.791 and an average speed of 100.584 miles per hour (161.874 km/h).

Pos.	#	Driver	Team	Make	Time	Speed
1	20	Corey Heim	Venturini Motorsports	Toyota	35.791	100.584
2	69	Will Kimmel	Kimmel Racing	Ford	35.824	100.491
3	24	Ryan Unzicker	Hendren Motorsports	Chevrolet	35.979	100.058
Full practice results

== Qualifying ==
Qualifying was held on Sunday, October 4, at 11:30 a.m. EST. Each driver would have two laps to set a fastest time; the fastest of the two would count as their official qualifying lap.

Ryan Unzicker of Hendren Motorsports would win the pole, setting a time of 34.047 and an average speed of 105.736 miles per hour (170.166 km/h). The pole was Unzicker's first.

Pos.	#	Driver	Team	Make	Time	Speed
1	24	Ryan Unzicker	Hendren Motorsports	Chevrolet	34.047	105.736
2	18	Ty Gibbs	Joe Gibbs Racing	Toyota	34.617	103.995
3	23	Bret Holmes	Bret Holmes Racing	Chevrolet	34.847	103.309
4	25	Michael Self	Venturini Motorsports	Toyota	34.852	103.294
5	4	Hailie Deegan	DGR-Crosley	Ford	34.869	103.244
6	16	Kelly Kovski	Allgaier Motorsports	Chevrolet	34.918	103.099
7	69	Will Kimmel	Kimmel Racing	Ford	34.919	103.096
8	20	Corey Heim	Venturini Motorsports	Toyota	34.930	103.063
9	17	Taylor Gray	DGR-Crosley	Ford	35.260	102.099
10	15	Drew Dollar	Venturini Motorsports	Toyota	37.116	96.993
11	06	Tim Richmond	Wayne Peterson Racing	Toyota	37.493	96.018
12	10	Mike Basham	Fast Track Racing	Toyota	37.892	95.007
13	11	Tim Monroe	Fast Track Racing	Toyota	38.763	92.872
14	12	Owen Smith	Fast Track Racing	Chevrolet	39.361	91.461
15	48	Brad Smith	Brad Smith Motorsports	Chevrolet	40.834	88.162
16	7	Eric Caudell	CCM Racing	Ford	41.976	85.763
17	0	Wayne Peterson	Wayne Peterson Racing	Chevrolet	—	—
Withdrew
WD	01	Alex Clubb	Fast Track Racing	Ford	—	—
Official qualifying results

== Race results ==
Fin	St	#	Driver	Team	Make	Laps	Led	Status	Pts
1	1	24	Ryan Unzicker	Hendren Motorsports	Chevrolet	103	102	running	49
2	5	4	Hailie Deegan	DGR-Crosley	Ford	103	1	running	43
3	3	23	Bret Holmes	Bret Holmes Racing	Chevrolet	103	0	running	41
4	9	17	Taylor Gray	DGR-Crosley	Ford	103	0	running	40
5	6	16	Kelly Kovski	Allgaier Motorsports	Chevrolet	103	0	running	39
6	12	10	Mike Basham	Fast Track Racing	Toyota	103	0	running	38
7	10	15	Drew Dollar	Venturini Motorsports	Toyota	101	0	running	37
8	8	20	Corey Heim	Venturini Motorsports	Toyota	97	0	crash	36
9	4	25	Michael Self	Venturini Motorsports	Toyota	97	0	crash	35
10	2	18	Ty Gibbs	Joe Gibbs Racing	Toyota	93	0	running	34
11	11	06	Tim Richmond	Wayne Peterson Racing	Toyota	81	0	overheating	33
12	13	11	Tim Monroe	Fast Track Racing	Toyota	32	0	transmission	32
13	15	48	Brad Smith	Brad Smith Motorsports	Chevrolet	30	0	clutch	31
14	7	69	Will Kimmel	Kimmel Racing	Ford	23	0	crash	30
15	14	12	Owen Smith	Fast Track Racing	Chevrolet	8	0	brakes	29
16	16	7	Eric Caudell	CCM Racing	Ford	6	0	suspension	28
17	17	0	Wayne Peterson	Wayne Peterson Racing	Chevrolet	0	0	brakes	27
Withdrew
WD		01	Alex Clubb	Fast Track Racing	Ford				
Official race results

Previous race: 2020 Sioux Chief PowerPEX 200	ARCA Menards Series; 2020 season	Next race: 2020 Speediatrics 150
