= 2021 Allen Crowe 100 =

Race details
- Race 15 of 20 of the 2021 ARCA Menards Series
- Date: August 22, 2021
- Official name: 39th Annual Allen Crowe 100
- Location: Springfield, Illinois, Illinois State Fairgrounds Racetrack
- Course: Permanent racing facility
- Course length: 1.6 km (1 miles)
- Distance: 100 laps, 100 mi (160 km)
- Scheduled distance: 100 laps, 100 mi (160 km)
- Average speed: 74.181 miles per hour (119.383 km/h)

Pole position
Driver	Corey Heim	Venturini Motorsports
- Time: 33.564

Most laps led
Driver	Corey Heim	Venturini Motorsports
- Laps: 86

Winner
No. 20	Corey Heim	Venturini Motorsports

Television in the United States
- Network: MAVTV
- Announcers: Bob Dillner, Jim Trebow

Radio in the United States
- Radio: ARCA Racing Network

The 2021 Allen Crowe 100 was the 15th stock car race of the 2021 ARCA Menards Series season, and the 39th iteration of the event. The race was held on Sunday, August 22, in Springfield, Illinois at the Illinois State Fairgrounds Racetrack, a 1 mile (1.6 km) permanent clay oval-shaped track at the Illinois State Fair. The race took the scheduled 100 laps to complete. At race's end, Corey Heim of Venturini Motorsports would dominate the race to win his seventh career ARCA Menards Series win and the sixth of the season. To fill out the podium, Ty Gibbs of Joe Gibbs Racing and Taylor Gray of David Gilliland Racing would finish second and third respectively.

== Background ==
Illinois State Fairgrounds Racetrack is a one mile long clay oval motor racetrack on the Illinois State Fairgrounds in Springfield, the state capital. It is frequently nicknamed The Springfield Mile. Constructed in the late 19th century and reconstructed in 1927, the track has hosted competitive auto racing since 1910, making it one of the oldest speedways in the United States. The original mile track utilized the current frontstretch and the other side was behind the current grandstands and the straightaways were connected by tight turns. It is the oldest track to continually host national championship dirt track racing, holding its first national championship race in 1934 under the American Automobile Association banner. It is the home of five world records for automobile racing, making it one of the fastest dirt tracks in the world. Since 1993, the venue is managed by Bob Sargent's Track Enterprises.

=== Entry list ===
#	Driver	Team	Make	Sponsor
01	Owen Smith	Fast Track Racing	Chevrolet	Fast Track Racing
2	Landen Lewis	Rev Racing	Chevrolet	LouLou's Waterfront Restaurant, L & A North Tire & Auto
06	Zachary Tinkle	Wayne Peterson Racing	Chevrolet	Great Railing
10	Tim Monroe	Fast Track Racing	Toyota	Mark Rumbold Farms, H. O. I. Vending
11	Michael Goudie	Fast Track Racing	Ford	Muskoka Aircraft Refinishing, Hypercoat
12	D. L. Wilson	Fast Track Racing	Chevrolet	Tradinghouse Bar & Grill
15	Jesse Love	Venturini Motorsports	Toyota	Mobil 1
16	Justin Allgaier	Roy Kovski Racing	Chevrolet	Brandt Professional Agriculture
18	Ty Gibbs	Joe Gibbs Racing	Toyota	Joe Gibbs Racing
20	Corey Heim	Venturini Motorsports	Toyota	Craftsman
24	Ryan Unzicker	Hendren Motorsports	Chevrolet	RJR Transportation Co.
25	Toni Breidinger	Venturini Motorsports	Toyota	Free People Movement
27	Alex Clubb	Richmond Clubb Motorsports	Ford	Darren Bailey for Illinois Governor
46	Taylor Gray	David Gilliland Racing	Ford	David Gilliland Racing
48	Brad Smith	Brad Smith Motorsports	Chevrolet	Henshaw Automation
69	Will Kimmel	Kimmel Racing	Ford	Kimmel Racing
Official entry list

== Practice ==
The only 30-minute practice session was held on Sunday, August 22, at 10:00 AM CST. Ryan Unzicker of Hendren Motorsports would set the fastest lap in the session, with a lap of 34.282 and an average speed of 105.011 miles per hour (168.999 km/h).

Pos.	#	Driver	Team	Make	Time	Speed
1	24	Ryan Unzicker	Hendren Motorsports	Chevrolet	34.282	105.011
2	20	Corey Heim	Venturini Motorsports	Toyota	34.320	104.895
3	46	Taylor Gray	David Gilliland Racing	Ford	34.605	104.031
Full practice results

== Qualifying ==
Qualifying would take place on Sunday, August 22, at 11:30 AM CST. Each driver would have one lap to set a time. Corey Heim of Venturini Motorsports would win the pole for the race, setting a lap of 33.564 and an average speed of 107.258 miles per hour (172.615 km/h).

No drivers would fail to qualify.

Pos.	#	Driver	Team	Make	Time	Speed
1	20	Corey Heim	Venturini Motorsports	Toyota	33.564	107.258
2	18	Ty Gibbs	Joe Gibbs Racing	Toyota	33.826	106.427
3	15	Jesse Love	Venturini Motorsports	Toyota	33.955	106.023
4	46	Taylor Gray	David Gilliland Racing	Ford	33.956	106.020
5	2	Landen Lewis	Rev Racing	Chevrolet	34.362	104.767
6	69	Will Kimmel	Kimmel Racing	Ford	34.601	104.043
7	25	Toni Breidinger	Venturini Motorsports	Toyota	34.687	103.785
8	16	Justin Allgaier	Roy Kovski Racing	Chevrolet	34.875	103.226
9	24	Ryan Unzicker	Hendren Motorsports	Chevrolet	35.164	102.377
10	27	Alex Clubb	Richmond Clubb Motorsports	Ford	36.553	98.487
11	12	D. L. Wilson	Fast Track Racing	Chevrolet	37.065	97.127
12	01	Owen Smith	Fast Track Racing	Chevrolet	37.100	97.035
13	10	Tim Monroe	Fast Track Racing	Toyota	37.122	96.978
14	11	Michael Goudie	Fast Track Racing	Ford	37.228	96.701
15	06	Zachary Tinkle	Wayne Peterson Racing	Chevrolet	37.620	95.694
16	48	Brad Smith	Brad Smith Motorsports	Chevrolet	—	—
Official qualifying results

== Race results ==
Fin	St	#	Driver	Team	Make	Laps	Led	Status	Pts
1	1	20	Corey Heim	Venturini Motorsports	Toyota	100	86	running	48
2	2	18	Ty Gibbs	Joe Gibbs Racing	Toyota	100	0	running	42
3	4	46	Taylor Gray	David Gilliland Racing	Ford	100	11	running	42
4	8	16	Justin Allgaier	Roy Kovski Racing	Chevrolet	100	0	running	40
5	3	15	Jesse Love	Venturini Motorsports	Toyota	100	3	running	40
6	6	69	Will Kimmel	Kimmel Racing	Ford	100	0	running	38
7	5	2	Landen Lewis	Rev Racing	Chevrolet	100	0	running	37
8	13	10	Tim Monroe	Fast Track Racing	Toyota	100	0	running	36
9	7	25	Toni Breidinger	Venturini Motorsports	Toyota	100	0	running	35
10	11	12	D. L. Wilson	Fast Track Racing	Chevrolet	84	0	running	34
11	14	11	Michael Goudie	Fast Track Racing	Ford	60	0	crash	33
12	15	06	Zachary Tinkle	Wayne Peterson Racing	Chevrolet	39	0	brakes	32
13	9	24	Ryan Unzicker	Hendren Motorsports	Chevrolet	23	0	vibration	31
14	16	48	Brad Smith	Brad Smith Motorsports	Chevrolet	12	0	vibration	30
15	10	27	Alex Clubb	Richmond Clubb Motorsports	Ford	10	0	handling	29
16	12	01	Owen Smith	Fast Track Racing	Chevrolet	5	0	clutch	28

Previous race: 2021 Henry Ford Health System 200	ARCA Menards Series; 2021 season	Next race: 2021 Sprecher 150
