= Southern National 200 =

ARCA Menards Series East
- Venue: Southern National Motorsports Park
- Location: Lucama, North Carolina
- Corporate sponsor: Solid Rock Carriers (presenting sponsor)
- First race: 2021
- Last race: 2021
- Distance: 80 miles (128.748 km)
- Laps: 200
- Most wins (driver): Sammy Smith (1)
- Most wins (team): Joe Gibbs Racing (1)
- Most wins (manufacturer): Toyota (1)

Circuit information
- Surface: Asphalt
- Length: 0.400 mi (0.644 km)
- Turns: 4

The Southern National 200 presented by Solid Rock Carriers was an 80-mile (128.748 km) ARCA Menards Series East race held at Southern National Motorsports Park in Lucama, North Carolina. The inaugural race was held in 2021 and won by Sammy Smith.

== Past winners ==
Year	Date	No.	Driver	Team	Manufacturer	Race distance		Race time	Average speed (mph)
Year	Date	No.	Driver	Team	Manufacturer	Laps	Miles (km)	Race time	Average speed (mph)
2021	June 12	18	Sammy Smith	Joe Gibbs Racing	Toyota	200	80 (128.748)	1:3:10	75.989
