= Joey Iest =

American racing driver (born 2003)

- Iest at All American Speedway in 2026
- Born: Joey Iest; February 12, 2003 (age 23); Madera, California, U.S.

ARCA Menards Series career
- 5 races run over 2 years
- Best finish: 33rd (2021)
- First race: 2021 General Tire 150 (Phoenix)
- Last race: 2022 General Tire 150 (Phoenix)
| Wins | Top tens | Poles |
|---|---|---|
| 0 | 1 | 0 |

ARCA Menards Series East career
- 8 races run over 1 year
- Best finish: 5th (2021)
- First race: 2021 Jeep Beach 175 (New Smyrna)
- Last race: 2021 Bush's Beans 200 (Bristol)
| Wins | Top tens | Poles |
|---|---|---|
| 0 | 6 | 0 |

ARCA Menards Series West career
- 34 races run over 6 years
- Best finish: 5th (2021, 2022)
- First race: 2020 Star Nursery 150 (Las Vegas Bullring)
- Last race: 2026 NAPA Auto Parts 150 (Bakersfield)
- First win: 2021 NAPA Auto Parts Colorado 150 (Colorado)
| Wins | Top tens | Poles |
|---|---|---|
| 1 | 18 | 0 |
- Statistics up to date as of November 1, 2026.

Joey Iest (born February 12, 2003) is an American professional stock car racing driver. He last competed part-time in the ARCA Menards Series West, driving the No. 88 Ford Fusion for Naake-Klauer Motorsports.

== Racing career ==
=== Early career ===
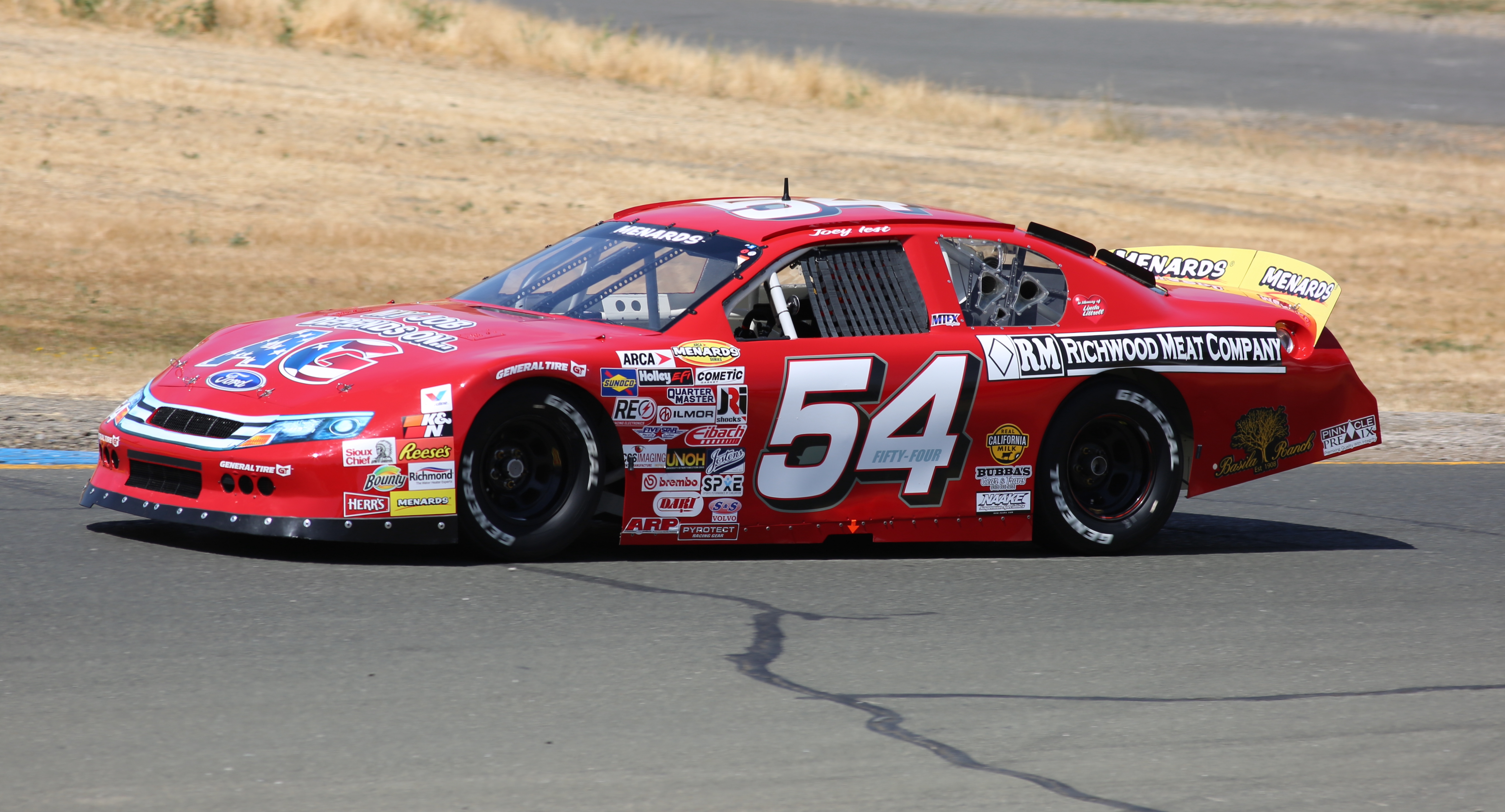
Iest at Sonoma Raceway in 2021

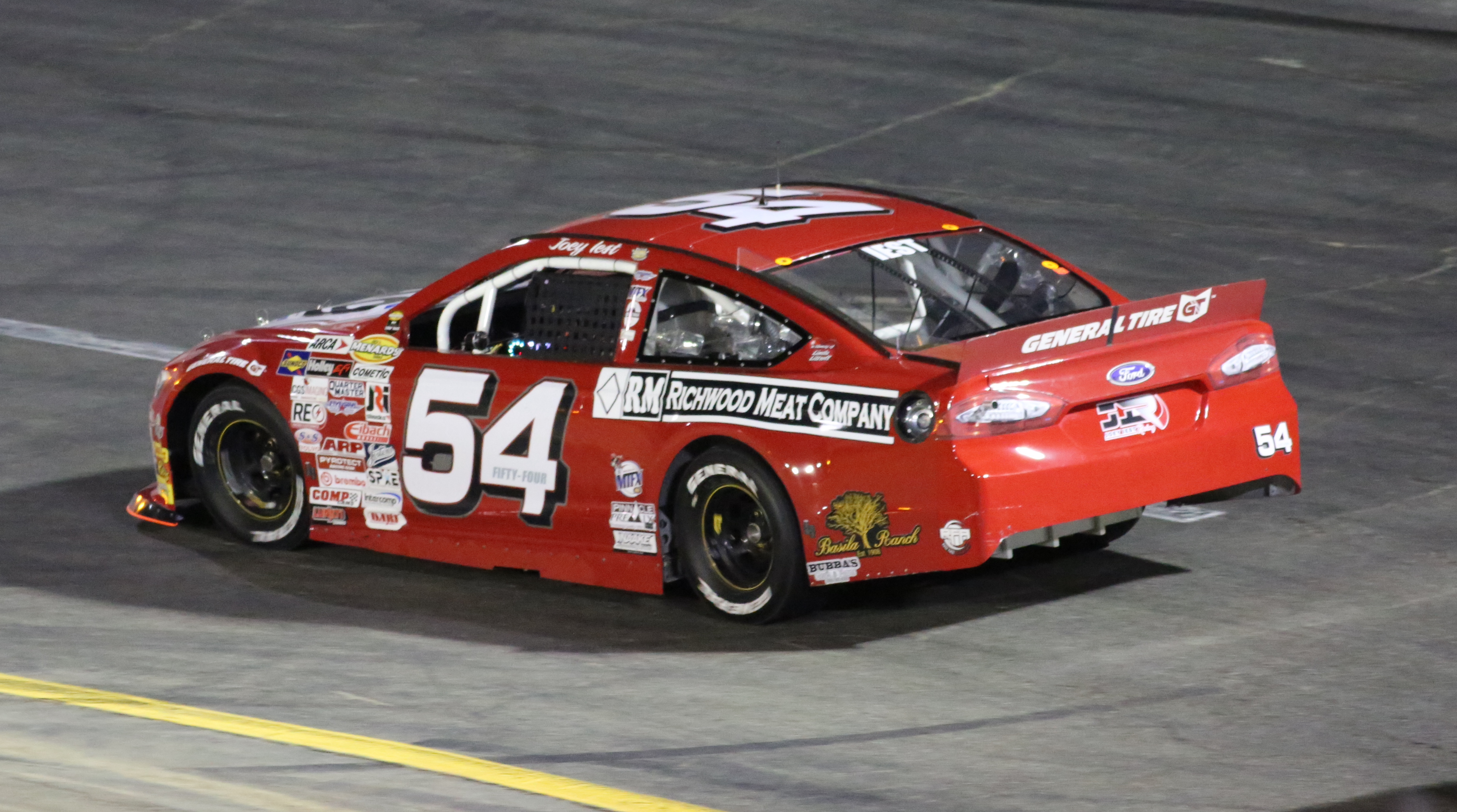
Iest's No. 54 car at All American Speedway in 2022

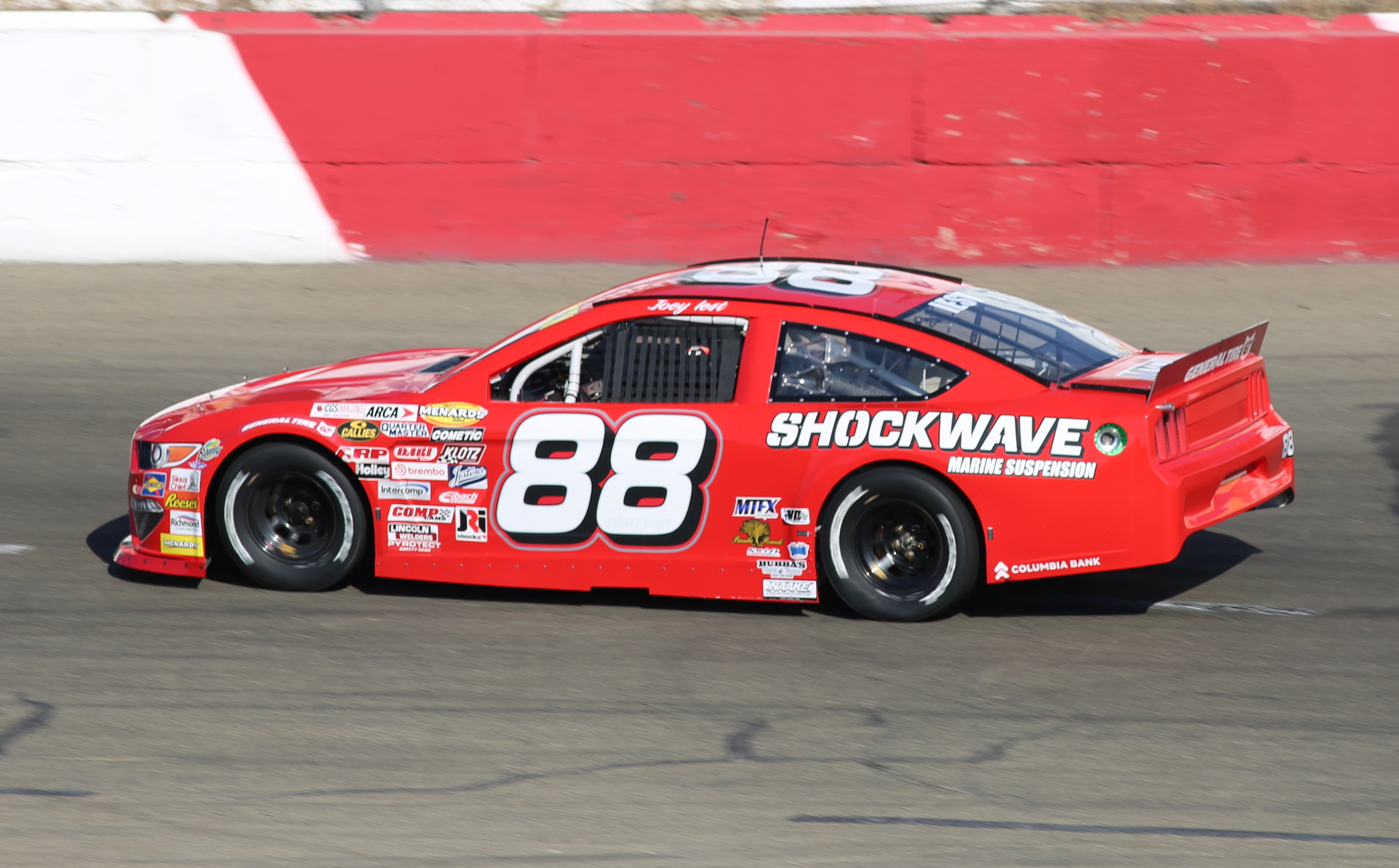
Iest's No. 88 car at All American Speedway in 2025

Iest started racing in 2012, at nine years old, after his grandfather bought him a used quarter midget. He had raced at his local home track, Madera Speedway. He didn't have any background coming into racing but got help from trainer Rusty Lomier throughout his five years of racing in quarter midgets.

Throughout 2012 to 2016, Iest competed in Senior Honda, Light 160, and Light World Formula events, and finished off his quarter midget career with two national championships.

Iest moved up to USAC HPD Focus Midget Series in 2017, racing at Madera Speedway. He would win Rookie of the Year in his first season.

Iest returned to the HPD Focus Midget Series in 2018, competing on dirt and asphalt tracks. He was allowed to drive a junior late model race at Madera Speedway for Naake-Klauer Motorsports later in the year. He started in the back but managed to finish in sixth. He would go on to drive the final four races of the 2018 season and would go full-time racing for Naake-Klauer in 2019.

2019 would be a successful year for Iest, as he won the 51FIFTY Jr. Late Model Series championship with Naake-Klauer Motorsports, along with winning the USAC Western Speed 2 Midget Series championship, getting seven wins in seven starts.

For 2020, Iest competed full-time in the SRL Southwest Tour, where he won his first career race at Stockton 99 Speedway, finishing in front of two former SRL champions, Jeremy Doss, and Cole Moore.

=== ARCA Menards Series West ===
On February 11, 2020, one day before his seventeenth birthday, Iest made his first career ARCA Menards Series West start at The Bullring at Las Vegas Motor Speedway for Naake-Klauer Motorsports. He would start third and finish fourteenth. He was expected to make four more starts that season, but only made three after withdrawing from the ENEOS 125 at Irwindale Speedway. His best finish from that season would be eleventh at The Bullring at Las Vegas Motor Speedway on September 26, 2020.

Iest returned to Naake-Klauer Motorsports for a full-time schedule in the 2021 ARCA Menards Series West season. On July 31, 2021, Iest captured his first career ARCA Menards Series West win at Colorado National Speedway, after leading the final eighteen laps.

=== ARCA Menards Series East ===
On December 18, 2020, it was announced that Iest would be driving part-time in the 2021 ARCA Menards Series East season for David Gilliland Racing. He was scheduled to run at least six races for the team but eventually announced he would be driving the full eight races of the season. He earned six top-tens, with his best finish of second at Southern National Motorsports Park.

=== ARCA Menards Series ===
Iest drove four races in the 2021 ARCA Menards Series season, all of which had a collaboration with ARCA Menards Series East, and ARCA Menards Series West races. His best finish would be eighth at the Milwaukee Mile.

== Motorsports career results ==
=== ARCA Menards Series ===
(key) (Bold – Pole position awarded by qualifying time. Italics – Pole position earned by points standings or practice time. * – Most laps led. ** – All laps led.)

ARCA Menards Series results
| Year | Team | No. | Make | 1 | 2 | 3 | 4 | 5 | 6 | 7 | 8 | 9 | 10 | 11 | 12 | 13 | 14 | 15 | 16 | 17 | 18 | 19 | 20 | AMSC | Pts | Ref |
|---|---|---|---|---|---|---|---|---|---|---|---|---|---|---|---|---|---|---|---|---|---|---|---|---|---|---|
| 2021 | Naake-Klauer Motorsports | 54W | Ford | DAY | PHO; 16 | TAL | KAN | TOL | CLT | MOH | POC | ELK | BLN | | | | | | | | | | | 33rd | 113 | |
| 2021 | David Gilliland Racing | 54 | Ford | | | | | | | | | | | IOW; 20 | WIN | GLN | MCH | ISF | MLW; 8 | DSF | BRI; 19 | SLM | KAN | 33rd | 113 | |
| 2022 | Naake-Klauer Motorsports | 54 | Ford | DAY | PHO; 13 | TAL | KAN | CLT | IOW | BLN | ELK | MOH | POC | IRP | MCH | GLN | ISF | MLW | DSF | KAN | BRI | SLM | TOL | 90th | 31 | |

==== ARCA Menards Series East ====
ARCA Menards Series East results
| Year | Team | No. | Make | 1 | 2 | 3 | 4 | 5 | 6 | 7 | 8 | AMSC | Pts | Ref |
|---|---|---|---|---|---|---|---|---|---|---|---|---|---|---|
| 2021 | David Gilliland Racing | 54 | Ford | NSM; 5 | FIF; 5 | NSV; 5 | DOV; 8 | **SNM**; 2 | IOW; 20 | MLW; 8 | BRI; 19 | 5th | 380 | |

==== ARCA Menards Series West ====
ARCA Menards Series West results
| Year | Team | No. | Make | 1 | 2 | 3 | 4 | 5 | 6 | 7 | 8 | 9 | 10 | 11 | 12 | 13 | AMSWC | Pts | Ref |
|---|---|---|---|---|---|---|---|---|---|---|---|---|---|---|---|---|---|---|---|
| 2020 | Naake-Klauer Motorsports | 54 | Toyota | LVS; 14 | MMP | MMP | IRW | EVG | DCS | CNS | LVS; 11 | AAS | KCR; 13 | PHO; 12 | | | 12th | 176 | |
| 2021 | Naake-Klauer Motorsports | 54 | Ford | PHO; 16 | SON; 20 | IRW; 3 | CNS; 1* | IRW; 4* | PIR; 4 | LVS; 4 | AAS; 2 | PHO; 17 | | | | | 5th | 430 | |
| 2022 | Naake-Klauer Motorsports | 54 | Ford | PHO; 13 | IRW; 10 | KCR; 17 | PIR; 10 | SON; 5 | IRW; 13 | EVG; 3 | PIR; 8 | AAS; 3 | LVS; 11 | PHO; 24 | | | 5th | 518 | |
| 2023 | Naake-Klauer Motorsports | 88 | Ford | PHO | IRW | KCR | PIR | SON | IRW | SHA | EVG | AAS; 4 | LVS | MAD; 3 | PHO; 25 | | 17th | 150 | |
| 2024 | Shockwave Motorsports | 05 | Toyota | PHO | KER | PIR | SON | IRW | IRW | SHA | TRI | MAD | AAS | KER | PHO; RL^{†} | | N/A | 0 | |
| 2025 | Naake-Klauer Motorsports | 88 | Ford | KER | PHO | TUC | CNS | KER | SON | TRI | PIR | AAS; 4 | MAD; 5 | LVS | PHO | | 27th | 79 | |
| 2026 | Naake-Klauer Motorsports | 88 | Ford | KER; 7 | PHO | TUC | SHA; 15 | CNS | TRI | SON | PIR | AAS; 16 | MAD; 6 | LVS | PHO | KER; 21 | 17th | 148 | |
^{†} – Relieved for David Smith
