= 2021 General Tire 125 =

Race details
- Race 4 of 8 in the 2021 ARCA Menards Series East season
- Date: May 14, 2021
- Location: Dover International Speedway in Dover, Delaware
- Course: Permanent racing facility
- Course length: 1.00 miles (1.61 km)
- Distance: 125 laps, 125.000 mi (201.168 km)
- Average speed: 85.05 miles per hour (136.87 km/h)

Pole position
Driver	Ty Gibbs	Joe Gibbs Racing
- Time: 23.168

Most laps led
Driver	Ty Gibbs	Joe Gibbs Racing
- Laps: 125

Winner
No. 18	Ty Gibbs	Joe Gibbs Racing

The 2021 General Tire 125 was a ARCA Menards Series East race held on May 14, 2021, at the Dover International Speedway in Dover, Delaware. It was contested over 125 laps on the 1.00-mile (1.61 km) oval. It was the fourth race of the 2021 ARCA Menards Series East season. Joe Gibbs Racing driver Ty Gibbs collected his first win of the East Series season.

== Background ==
=== Entry list ===
- (R) denotes rookie driver.
- (i) denotes driver who is ineligible for series driver points.

No.	Driver	Team	Manufacturer
6	Rajah Caruth	Rev Racing	Chevrolet
10	Ed Pompa	Fast Track Racing	Toyota
11	Jade Buford	Fast Track Racing	Ford
12	Dick Doheny	Fast Track Racing	Toyota
15	Drew Dollar	Venturini Motorsports	Toyota
17	David Gilliland	David Gilliland Racing	Ford
18	Ty Gibbs	Joe Gibbs Racing	Toyota
25	Jesse Love	Venturini Motorsports	Toyota
28	Kyle Sieg	RSS Racing	Chevrolet
30	Max Gutiérrez	Rette Jones Racing	Ford
41	Josh Berry	Cook-Finley Racing	Chevrolet
42	Parker Retzlaff	Cook-Finley Racing	Toyota
43	Daniel Dye	Ben Kennedy Racing	Chevrolet
54	Joey Iest	David Gilliland Racing	Ford
74	Mason Diaz	Visconti Motorsports	Toyota
81	Sammy Smith	Joe Gibbs Racing	Toyota
91	Justin Carroll	TC Motorsports	Toyota
02	Connor Mosack	Young's Motorsports	Chevrolet
Official entry list

== Practice/qualifying ==
Practice and Qualifying were combined for this race. The fastest lap in practice counted as a qualifying lap. Ty Gibbs won the pole with a time of 23.168 seconds and a speed of 155.387 miles per hour (250.071 km/h)

=== Starting lineups ===
Pos	No	Driver	Team	Manufacturer	Time
1	18	Ty Gibbs	Joe Gibbs Racing	Toyota	23.168
2	54	Joey Iest	David Gilliland Racing	Ford	23.737
3	6	Rajah Caruth	GMS Racing	Chevrolet	23.745
4	15	Drew Dollar	Venturini Motorsports	Toyota	23.745
5	81	Sammy Smith	Joe Gibbs Racing	Toyota	23.762
6	17	David Gilliland	David Gilliland Racing	Ford	24.000
7	41	Josh Berry	Cook-Finley Racing	Chevrolet	24.002
8	30	Max Gutierrez	Rette Jones Racing	Ford	24.033
9	74	Mason Diaz	Visconti Motorsports	Toyota	24.409
10	25	Jesse Love	Venturini Motorsports	Toyota	24.409
11	42	Parker Retzlaff	Cook-Finley Racing	Toyota	24.420
12	11	Jade Buford	Fast Track Racing	Ford	24.527
13	28	Kyle Sieg	RSS Racing	Chevrolet	24.451
14	02	Connor Mosack	Young's Motorsports	Chevrolet	24.621
15	43	Daniel Dye	Ben Kennedy Racing	Chevrolet	24.947
16	91	Justin Carroll	TC Motorsports	Toyota	25.078
17	10	Ed Pompa	Fast Track Racing	Toyota	25.812
18	12	Dick Doheny	Fast Track Racing	Toyota	28.309
Official qualifying results

== Race ==
=== Race results ===
Pos	Grid	No	Driver	Team	Manufacturer	Laps	Points	Status
1	1	18	Ty Gibbs	Joe Gibbs Racing	Toyota	125	49	Running
2	7	41	Josh Berry	Cook-Finley Racing	Chevrolet	125	42	Running
3	6	17	David Gilliland	David Gilliland Racing	Ford	125	41	Running
4	5	81	Sammy Smith	Joe Gibbs Racing	Toyota	125	40	Running
5	8	30	Max Gutierrez	Rette Jones Racing	Ford	125	39	Running
6	15	43	Daniel Dye	Ben Kennedy Racing	Chevrolet	125	38	Running
7	14	02	Connor Mosack	Young's Motorsports	Chevrolet	125	37	Running
8	2	54	Joey Iest	David Gilliland Racing	Ford	125	36	Running
9	12	11	Jade Buford	Fast Track Racing	Ford	125	35	Running
10	17	10	Ed Pompa	Fast Track Racing	Toyota	121	34	Running
11	9	74	Mason Diaz	Visconti Motorsports	Toyota	118	33	Overheating
12	11	42	Parker Retzlaff	Cook-Finley Racing	Toyota	113	32	Running
13	13	28	Kyle Sieg	RSS Racing	Chevrolet	83	31	Crash
14	3	6	Rajah Caruth	Rev Racing	Chevrolet	74	30	Crash
15	18	12	Dick Doheny	Fast Track Racing	Toyota	27	29	Mechanical
16	4	15	Drew Dollar	Venturini Motorsports	Toyota	24	28	Crash
17	16	91	Justin Carroll	TC Motorsports	Toyota	21	27	Crash
18	10	25	Jesse Love	Venturini Motorsports	Toyota	20	26	Engine

Previous race: 2021 Crosley Record Pressing 200	ARCA Menards Series East; 2021 season	Next race: 2021 Southern National 200
