= 2021 Jeep Beach 175 =

Race details
- Race 1 of 8 in the 2021 ARCA Menards Series East season
- Date: February 8, 2021
- Location: New Smyrna Speedway in New Smyrna Beach, Florida
- Course: Permanent racing facility
- Course length: 0.48 miles (0.77 km)
- Distance: 175 laps, 84.000 mi (131.185 km)
- Average speed: 64.203 miles per hour (103.325 km/h)

Pole position
| Driver | Taylor Gray | David Gilliland Racing |
- Time: 18.768

Most laps led
| Driver | Sammy Smith | Joe Gibbs Racing |
- Laps: 78

Winner
| No. 30 | Max Gutiérrez | Rette Jones Racing |

The 2021 Jeep Beach 175 was a ARCA Menards Series East race held on February 8, 2021. It was contested over 187 laps—extended from 175 laps due to an overtime finish—on the 0.48-mile (0.77 km) short track. It was the first race of the 2021 ARCA Menards Series East season. Rette Jones Racing driver Max Gutiérrez collected his first career win in the ARCA Menards Series East.

== Background ==
=== Entry list ===
- (R) denotes rookie driver.
- (i) denotes driver who is ineligible for series driver points.

| No. | Driver | Team | Manufacturer |
|---|---|---|---|
| 3 | Willie Mullins | Mullins Racing | Chevrolet |
| 6 | Rajah Caruth | Rev Racing | Chevrolet |
| 10 | Dick Doheny | Fast Track Racing | Chevrolet |
| 11 | Richard Garvie | Fast Track Racing | Chevrolet |
| 17 | Taylor Gray | David Gilliland Racing | Ford |
| 18 | Sammy Smith | Joe Gibbs Racing | Toyota |
| 21 | Jack Wood | GMS Racing | Chevrolet |
| 22 | Brandon Oakley | Brandon Oakley Racing | Toyota |
| 30 | Max Gutiérrez | Rette Jones Racing | Ford |
| 41 | Carson Kvapil | Cook-Finley Racing | Chevrolet |
| 42 | Parker Retzlaff | Cook-Finley Racing | Toyota |
| 43 | Daniel Dye | Ben Kennedy Racing | Chevrolet |
| 54 | Joey Iest | David Gilliland Racing | Ford |
| 74 | Mason Diaz | Visconti Motorsports | Toyota |
| 87 | Chuck Buchanan | Charles Buchanan Racing | Chevrolet |
| 09 | Colt Hensley | Jett Motorsports | Toyota |
Official entry list

== Practice ==
Sammy Smith was the fastest in the practice session with a time of 18.715 seconds and a speed of 92.332 mph (148.594 km/h).

| Pos | No. | Driver | Team | Manufacturer | Time | Speed |
|---|---|---|---|---|---|---|
| 1 | 18 | Sammy Smith | Joe Gibbs Racing | Toyota | 18.715 | 92.332 |
| 2 | 42 | Parker Retzlaff | Cook-Finley Racing | Chevrolet | 18.793 | 91.949 |
| 3 | 17 | Taylor Gray | David Gilliland Racing | Ford | 18.825 | 91.793 |
Official practice results

== Qualifying ==
Taylor Gray earned the pole award, posting a time of 18.768 seconds and a speed of 92.072 mph (148.176 km/h)

=== Starting Lineups ===
| Pos | No | Driver | Team | Manufacturer | Time |
|---|---|---|---|---|---|
| 1 | 17 | Taylor Gray | David Gilliland Racing | Ford | 18.768 |
| 2 | 30 | Max Gutierrez | Rette Jones Racing | Ford | 18.793 |
| 3 | 54 | Joey Iest | David Gilliland Racing | Ford | 18.804 |
| 4 | 21 | Jack Wood | GMS Racing | Chevrolet | 18.810 |
| 5 | 74 | Mason Diaz | Risconti Motorsports | Toyota | 18.840 |
| 6 | 42 | Parker Retzlaff | Cook-Finley Racing | Toyota | 18.841 |
| 7 | 6 | Rajah Caruth | Rev Racing | Chevrolet | 18.865 |
| 8 | 43 | Daniel Dye | Ben Kennedy Racing | Chevrolet | 18.914 |
| 9 | 18 | Sammy Smith | Joe Gibbs Racing | Toyota | 18.915 |
| 10 | 41 | Carson Kvapil | Cook-Finley Racing | Chevrolet | 18.962 |
| 11 | 22 | Brandon Oakley | Brandon Oakley Racing | Toyota | 19.181 |
| 12 | 09 | Colt Hensley | Jett Motorsports | Toyota | 19.248 |
| 13 | 3 | Willie Mullins | Mullins Racing | Ford | 19.706 |
| 14 | 10 | Dick Doheny | Fast Track Racing | Toyota | 20.680 |
| 15 | 11 | Richard Garvie | Fast Track Racing | Ford | 20.726 |
| 16 | 87 | Chuck Buchanan | Charles Buchanan Racing | Chevrolet | 21.251 |
Official qualifying results

== Race ==
=== Race results ===
| Pos | Grid | No | Driver | Team | Manufacturer | Laps | Points | Status |
|---|---|---|---|---|---|---|---|---|
| 1 | 2 | 30 | Max Gutierrez | Rette Jones Racing | Toyota | 187 | 47 | Running |
| 2 | 9 | 18 | Sammy Smith | Joe Gibbs Racing | Toyota | 187 | 44 | Running |
| 3 | 1 | 17 | Taylor Gray | David Gilliland Racing | Ford | 187 | 43 | Running |
| 4 | 5 | 74 | Mason Diaz | Visconti Motorsports | Toyota | 187 | 41 | Running |
| 5 | 3 | 54 | Joey Iest | David Gilliland Racing | Ford | 187 | 39 | Running |
| 6 | 8 | 43 | Daniel Dye | Ben Kennedy Racing | Chevrolet | 187 | 38 | Running |
| 7 | 12 | 09 | Colt Hensley | Jett Motorsports | Toyota | 187 | 36 | Running |
| 8 | 11 | 22 | Brandon Oakley | Brandon Oakley Racing | Toyota | 187 | 36 | Running |
| 9 | 6 | 42 | Parker Retzlaff | Cook-Finley Racing | Toyota | 185 | 36 | Running |
| 10 | 13 | 3 | Willie Mullins | Mullins Racing | Ford | 183 | 34 | Running |
| 11 | 7 | 6 | Rajah Caruth | Rev Racing | Chevrolet | 177 | 33 | Running |
| 12 | 15 | 11 | Richard Garvie | Fast Track Racing | Ford | 176 | 32 | Running |
| 13 | 4 | 21 | Jack Wood | GMS Racing | Chevrolet | 127 | 31 | Crash |
| 14 | 10 | 41 | Carson Kvapil | Cook-Finley Racing | Chevrolet | 120 | 30 | Ignition |
| 15 | 14 | 10 | Dick Doheny | Fast Track Racing | Toyota | 4 | 29 | Vibration |
| 16 | 16 | 87 | Chuck Buchanan | Charles Buchanan Racing | Chevrolet | 0 | 3 | Did Not Start |

| Previous race: 2020 Pensacola 200 | ARCA Menards Series East; 2021 season | Next race: 2021 Pensacola 200 |
