= 2021 Crosley Record Pressing 200 =

Race details
- Race 3 of 8 in the 2021 ARCA Menards Series East season
- Date: May 8, 2021
- Location: Nashville Fairgrounds Speedway in Nashville, Tennessee
- Course: Permanent racing facility
- Course length: 0.959 km (0.596 miles)
- Distance: 200 laps, 119.20 mi (198.83 km)
- Average speed: 91.438 miles per hour (147.155 km/h)

Pole position
Driver	Mason Mingus	Fast Track Racing
- Time: 19.504

Most laps led
Driver	Sammy Smith	Joe Gibbs Racing
- Laps: 103

Winner
No. 18	Sammy Smith	Joe Gibbs Racing

The 2021 Crosley Record Pressing 200 was a ARCA Menards Series East race held on May 8, 2021. It was contested over 200 laps on the 0.596-mile (0.959 km) short track. It was the third race of the 2021 ARCA Menards Series East season. Joe Gibbs Racing driver Sammy Smith collected his second win of the season.

== Background ==
=== Entry list ===
- (R) denotes rookie driver.
- (i) denotes driver who is ineligible for series driver points.

No.	Driver	Team	Manufacturer
6	Rajah Caruth	Rev Racing	Chevrolet
10	Dick Doheny	Fast Track Racing	Toyota
11	Mason Mingus	Fast Track Racing	Ford
12	Stephanie Moyer	Fast Track Racing	Toyota
18	Sammy Smith	Joe Gibbs Racing	Toyota
21	Conner Jones	GMS Racing	Chevrolet
30	Max Gutiérrez	Rette Jones Racing	Ford
41	Carson Kvapil	Cook-Finley Racing	Chevrolet
42	Parker Retzlaff	Cook-Finley Racing	Toyota
43	Daniel Dye	Ben Kennedy Racing	Chevrolet
48	Brad Smith	Brad Smith Motorsports	Chevrolet
54	Joey Iest	David Gilliland Racing	Ford
74	Mason Diaz	Visconti Motorsports	Toyota
06	Wayne Peterson	Wayne Peterson Motorsports	Chevrolet
Official entry list

== Practice ==
Sammy Smith was the fastest in practice with a time of 19.680 seconds and a speed of 109.024 mph (175.457 km/h).

Pos	No.	Driver	Team	Manufacturer	Time	Speed
1	18	Sammy Smith	Joe Gibbs Racing	Toyota	19.680	109.024
2	43	Daniel Dye	Ben Kennedy Racing	Chevrolet	19.770	108.528
3	42	Parker Retzlaff	Cook-Finley Racing	Toyota	19.782	108.462
Official practice results

== Qualifying ==
Mason Mingus earned the pole award, posting a time of 19.504 seconds and a speed of 110.008 mph (177.041 km/h)

=== Starting Lineups ===
Pos	No	Driver	Team	Manufacturer	Time
1	11	Mason Mingus	Fast Track Racing	Ford	19.504
2	18	Sammy Smith	Joe Gibbs Racing	Toyota	19.510
3	43	Daniel Dye	Ben Kennedy Racing	Chevrolet	19.568
4	42	Parker Retzlaff	Cook-Finley Racing	Chevrolet	19.603
5	54	Joey Iest	David Gilliland Racing	Ford	19.606
6	74	Mason Diaz	Visconti Motorsports	Toyota	19.708
7	6	Rajah Caruth	Rev Racing	Chevrolet	19.741
8	21	Conner Jones	GMS Racing	Chevrolet	19.772
9	41	Carson Kvapil	Cook-Finley Racing	Chevrolet	20.088
10	30	Max Gutierrez	Rette Jones Racing	Ford	20.094
11	12	Stephanie Moyer	Fast Track Racing	Toyota	21.281
12	10	Dick Doheny	Fast Track Racing	Toyota	21.326
13	06	Wayne Peterson	Wayne Peterson Racing	Chevrolet	
Official qualifying results

== Race ==
=== Race results ===
Pos	Grid	No	Driver	Team	Manufacturer	Laps	Points	Status
1	2	18	Sammy Smith	Joe Gibbs Racing	Toyota	200	48	Running
2	6	74	Mason Diaz	Visconti Motorsports	Toyota	200	43	Running
3	1	11	Mason Mingus	Fast Track Racing	Ford	200	43	Running
4	8	21	Conner Jones	GMS Racing	Chevrolet	200	40	Running
5	5	54	Joey Iest	David Gilliland Racing	Ford	200	39	Running
6	7	6	Rajah Caruth	Rev Racing	Chevrolet	200	38	Running
7	4	42	Parker Retzlaff	Cook-Finley Racing	Toyota	200	37	Running
8	3	43	Daniel Dye	Ben Kennedy Racing	Chevrolet	200	36	Running
9	10	30	Max Gutierrez	Rette Jones Racing	Ford	199	35	Running
10	11	12	Stephanie Moyer	Fast Track Racing	Toyota	193	34	Running
11	9	41	Carson Kvapil	Cook-Finley Racing	Chevrolet	16	33	Engine
12	12	10	Dick Doheny	Fast Track Racing	Toyota	4	32	Electrical
13	13	06	Wayne Peterson	Wayne Peterson Racing	Chevrolet	1	31	Brakes

Previous race: 2021 Pensacola 200	ARCA Menards Series East; 2021 season	Next race: 2021 General Tire 125
