= 2021 Pensacola 200 =

Race details
- Race 2 of 8 in the 2021 ARCA Menards Series East season
- Date: February 27, 2021
- Location: Five Flags Speedway in Pensacola, Florida
- Course: Permanent racing facility
- Course length: 0.50 miles (0.80 km)
- Distance: 200 laps, 100.00 mi (160.93 km)
- Average speed: 76.694 miles per hour (123.427 km/h)

Pole position
Driver	Sammy Smith	Joe Gibbs Racing
- Time: 17.493

Most laps led
Driver	Sammy Smith	Joe Gibbs Racing
- Laps: 145

Winner
No. 18	Sammy Smith	Joe Gibbs Racing

The 2021 Pensacola 200 was a ARCA Menards Series East race held on February 27, 2021, at the Five Flags Speedway. It was contested over 200 laps on the 0.50-mile (0.80 km) short track. It was the second race of the 2021 ARCA Menards Series East season. Joe Gibbs Racing driver Sammy Smith collected his first career win in the ARCA Menards Series East.

== Background ==
=== Entry list ===
- (R) denotes rookie driver.
- (i) denotes driver who is ineligible for series driver points.

No.	Driver	Team	Manufacturer
6	Rajah Caruth	Rev Racing	Toyota
10	Dick Doheny	Fast Track Racing	Toyota
11	Richard Garvie	Fast Track Racing	Ford
12	Stephanie Moyer	Fast Track Racing	Toyota
17	Taylor Gray	David Gilliland Racing	Ford
18	Sammy Smith	Joe Gibbs Racing	Toyota
22	Zachary Tinkle	Brandon Oakley Racing	Toyota
30	Max Gutiérrez	Rette Jones Racing	Ford
41	Carson Kvapil	Cook-Finley Racing	Chevrolet
42	Parker Retzlaff	Cook-Finley Racing	Toyota
43	Daniel Dye	Ben Kennedy Racing	Chevrolet
48	Brad Smith	Brad Smith Motorsports	Chevrolet
54	Joey Iest	David Gilliland Racing	Ford
74	Mason Diaz	Visconti Motorsports	Toyota
06	Wayne Peterson	Wayne Peterson Racing	Chevrolet
Official entry list

== Practice/Qualifying ==
Practice was delayed due to rain, leading to the combination of the practice and qualifying sessions. Sammy Smith posted the fastest lap in practice, with a time of 17.493 seconds and a speed of 102.898 mph (165.598 km/h) gave him the pole award.

=== Starting Lineups ===
Pos	No	Driver	Team	Manufacturer	Time
1	18	Sammy Smith	Joe Gibbs Racing	Toyota	17.493
2	17	Taylor Gray	David Gilliland Racing	Ford	17.547
3	6	Rajah Caruth	Rev Racing	Chevrolet	17.630
4	21	Daniel Dye	Ben Kennedy Racing	Chevrolet	17.719
5	74	Mason Diaz	Risconti Motorsports	Toyota	17.778
6	54	Joey Iest	David Gilliland Racing	Ford	17.822
7	30	Max Gutierrez	Rette Jones Racing	Ford	17.916
8	41	Carson Kvapil	Cook-Finley Racing	Chevrolet	17.955
9	42	Parker Retzlaff	Cook-Finley Racing	Toyota	17.996
10	12	Stephanie Moyer	Cook-Finley Racing	Toyota	19.230
11	10	Dick Doheny	Fast Track Racing	Toyota	20.255
12	11	Richard Garvie	Fast Track Racing	Ford	20.941
13	06	Wayne Peterson	Wayne Peterson Racing	Chevrolet	29.177
Official qualifying results

== Race ==
=== Race results ===
Pos	Grid	No	Driver	Team	Manufacturer	Laps	Points	Status
1	1	18	Sammy Smith	Joe Gibbs Racing	Toyota	200	49	Running
2	5	74	Mason Diaz	Visconti Motorsports	Toyota	200	42	Running
3	2	17	Taylor Gray	David Gilliland Racing	Ford	200	42	Running
4	3	6	Rajah Caruth	Rev Racing	Toyota	200	40	Running
5	6	54	Joey Iest	David Gilliland Racing	Ford	200	39	Running
6	9	42	Parker Retzlaff	Cook-Finley Racing	Toyota	200	38	Running
7	7	30	Max Gutierrez	Rette Jones Racing	Ford	200	36	Running
8	10	12	Stephanie Moyer	Fast Track Racing	Toyota	188	36	Running
9	4	43	Daniel Dye	Ben Kennedy Racing	Chevrolet	183	36	Radiator
10	12	11	Richard Garvie	Fast Track Racing	Ford	178	34	Running
11	8	41	Carson Kvapil	Cook-Finley Racing	Chevrolet	174	33	Vibration
12	11	10	Dick Doheny	Fast Track Racing	Toyota	6	32	Electrical
13	13	06	Wayne Peterson	Wayne Peterson Racing	Chevrolet	2	31	Electrical

Previous race: 2021 Jeep Beach 175	ARCA Menards Series East; 2021 season	Next race: 2021 Crosley Record Pressing 200
