= Southern National Motorsports Park =

Racetrack

- Location: 8071 Newsome Mill Road Lucama, North Carolina 27851
- Coordinates: 35°36′40″N 78°3′39″W
- Capacity: 4,500
- Owner: Michael Diaz (October 2011–present)
- Operator: Michael Diaz (2012–present)
- Opened: 1993
- Former names: Southern National Raceway Park (2006–2012); Southern National Speedway (1993–2005)
- Major events: Current: CARS Tour (1997, 2002–2008, 2012–2016, 2019–2020, 2023–2024, 2026); Former: ARCA Menards Series East; Southern National 200 (2021); SMART Modified Tour (1993–1994, 2006–2008, 2013–2014, 2022); NASCAR Southeast Series (1996–1998, 2002); ASA National Tour (1998)

Oval (1993–present)
- Surface: Asphalt
- Length: 0.400 mi (0.644 km)
- Banking: Turns: 17° Straightaways: 7°

Southern National Motorsports Park (formerly Southern National Speedway and Southern National Raceway Park) is a 0.400 mi (0.644 km) auto racing track in Lucama, North Carolina.

== History ==
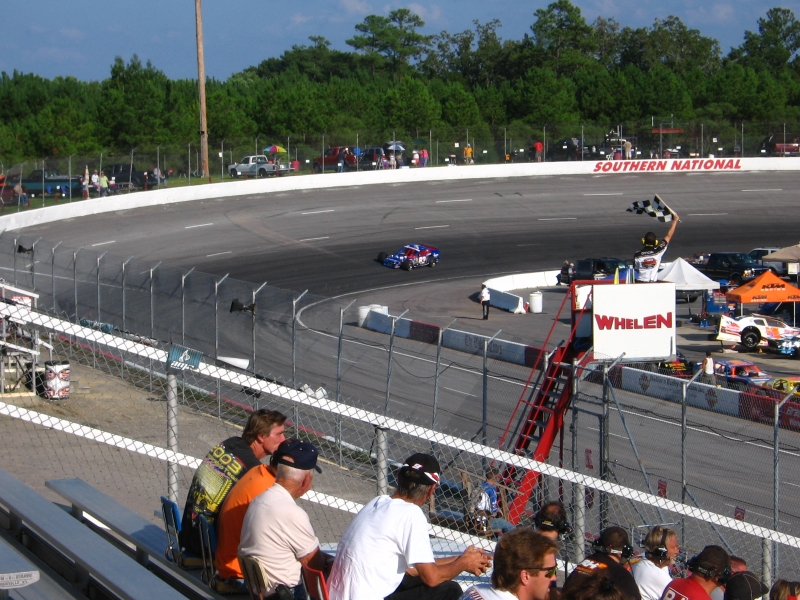
View of racetrack from 2008

Southern National Motorsports Park hosted four NASCAR Southeast Series races between 1996 and 2002. The track also hosted seven NASCAR Whelen Southern Modified Tour events between 2006 and 2014.

The facility had one ASA National Tour race in 1998.

Between 1997 and 2014, the track also hosted 15 CARS X-1R Pro Cup Series events. 11 different drivers had won races and some of them drove in NASCAR, like Mario Gosselin, Bobby Gill, Mark McFarland, Michael Ritch, Clay Rogers and Caleb Holman.

In 2009, the track essentially closed with only a single racing event taking place on the track. The PASS South Super Late Model Series held one of their points races at the track on September 26, 2009. A USARacing Pro Cup Series event had been scheduled for August 15, 2009, but it was canceled by the series and replaced by a second race at Langley Speedway.

Southern National Raceway Park came up for auction on October 7, 2011 and Michael Diaz purchased the facility for $650,000. The track re-opened in 2012 as Southern National Motorsports Park with a regular racing schedule.

Between 2015 until now, CARS Super Late Model Tour hosted 6 races at the track. Six different drivers had won races, including notable NASCAR drivers like Christopher Bell, Quin Houff, Raphaël Lessard and Bubba Pollard. In that period, the CARS Late Model Stock Tour also had run six races at the track, five different drivers had won races, including notable NASCAR drivers like Todd Gilliland, Deac McCaskill, Josh Berry and Taylor Gray.

In December 2015, the track was added to the racing simulation site iRacing.com.

On December 18, 2020, it was announced that Southern National would host an ARCA Menards Series East race for the first time on June 12, 2021.

The track would lose its ARCA East race but would gain a Carolina Pro Late Model Series and SMART Modified Tour race in 2022.

Southern National would host the richest Late Model Stock race in history, their annual Thanksgiving Classic in 2022, paying $50,000 to win. In 2023, the facility celebrated its 30th anniversary.

The track agreed with Florence Motor Speedway to become an outlaw unsanctioned track for 2025. Their eight race series will feature four races at each track and a two-round final featuring the Charlie Powell Memorial in Florence and Thanksgiving Classic in Southern National held both in November. The top four drivers in points after four rounds (one winter and spring round at each track) advance to the championship round. Then the next two races (September at Southern National and October in Florence) will take the top two in points who will participate in the six-driver, two-round November championship. All six drivers qualify for both the Charlie Powell Memorial in Florence and Thanksgiving Classic in Southern National. The driver highest in points (with bonus points included for the four who qualified in July) wins the Interstate 95 Showdown series between the two tracks.
