= 2019 ARCA Pensacola 200 =

2019 ARCA Pensacola 200 presented by Inspectra Thermal Solutions
Race details
- Race 2 of 20 of the 2019 ARCA Menards Series
- Date: March 9, 2019
- Official name: 6th Annual ARCA Pensacola 200 presented by Inspectra Thermal Solutions
- Location: Pensacola, Florida, Five Flags Speedway
- Course: Permanent racing facility
- Course length: 0.5 miles (0.8 km)
- Distance: 200 laps, 100 mi (160 km)
- Scheduled distance: 200 laps, 100 mi (160 km)
- Average speed: 82.892 miles per hour (133.402 km/h)

Pole position
Driver	Chandler Smith	Venturini Motorsports
- Time: 16.990

Most laps led
Driver	Raphaël Lessard	KBR Development
- Laps: 83

Winner
No. 25	Michael Self	Venturini Motorsports

Television in the United States
- Network: MAVTV
- Announcers: Bob Dillner, Jim Tretow

Radio in the United States
- Radio: ARCA Racing Network

The 2019 ARCA Pensacola 200 presented by Inspectra Thermal Solutions was the second stock car race of the 2019 ARCA Menards Series season and the 6th iteration of the event. The race was held on Saturday, March 9, 2019, in Pensacola, Florida, at Five Flags Speedway, a 0.5 miles (0.80 km) paved oval-shaped racetrack. The race took the scheduled 200 laps to complete. At race's end, Michael Self of Venturini Motorsports would take the lead from Kaden Honeycutt in the late stages of the race to take home his fourth ARCA Menards Series win and his first of the season. To fill out the podium, Ty Gibbs of Joe Gibbs Racing and Christian Eckes of Venturini Motorsports would finish second and third, respectively.

== Background ==
Five Flags Speedway is a paved half mile (0.8 km) auto racing oval in Pensacola, Florida, United States. It opened in 1953 and is located on Pine Forest Road. It is christened after the nickname of Pensacola—"City of Five Flags."

It runs several local classes during the regular racing season (March – October). These classes include Super Late Models, Pro Late Models, Pro Trucks, Outlaw Stocks, Sportsman, and Pure Stocks. The races are usual held on Friday nights bi-weekly. The track has also hosted many regional touring series.

=== Entry list ===
#	Driver	Team	Make	Sponsor
1	Dick Doheny	Fast Track Racing	Chevrolet	Fast Track Racing
06	Tim Richmond	Wayne Peterson Racing	Dodge	Great Railing
10	Tommy Vigh Jr.	Fast Track Racing	Ford	Extreme Kleaner
11	Matt Dooley	Fast Track Racing	Ford	Ohio Ag Equipment, Ashville Propane
14	Connor Okrzesik	Connor Okrzesik Racing	Chevrolet	Metro Glass
15	Christian Eckes	Venturini Motorsports	Toyota	JBL
18	Ty Gibbs	Joe Gibbs Racing	Toyota	Monster Energy
19	Raphaël Lessard	KBR Development	Chevrolet	FRL Express
20	Chandler Smith	Venturini Motorsports	Toyota	Craftsman
21	Sam Mayer	GMS Racing	Chevrolet	Chevrolet Accessories
22	Corey Heim	Chad Bryant Racing	Ford	SRI Performance, Speedway Children's Charities
23	Bret Holmes	Bret Holmes Racing	Chevrolet	Holmes II Excavating
25	Michael Self	Venturini Motorsports	Toyota	Sinclair
27	Travis Braden	RFMS Racing	Ford	MatrixCare
28	Carson Hocevar	KBR Development	Chevrolet	Scott's Sports Cards, Coins, & Jewelry
38	Kaden Honeycutt	Kaden Honeycutt Racing	Ford	C&S Trailers
48	Brad Smith	Brad Smith Motorsports	Ford	HIE Publishing
54	Tanner Gray	DGR-Crosley	Toyota	Valvoline
69	Mike Basham	Kimmel Racing	Ford	Kimmel Racing
73	Dale Shearer*	Dale Shearer Racing	Ford	Dale Shearer Racing
77	Joe Graf Jr.	Chad Bryant Racing	Ford	Eat Sleep Race
Official entry list

== Practice ==
The only 90-minute practice session was held on Saturday, March 9, at 1:00 PM EST. Michael Self of Venturini Motorsports would set the fastest time in the session, with a time of 17.159 and an average speed of 104.901 miles per hour (168.822 km/h).

Pos.	#	Driver	Team	Make	Time	Speed
1	25	Michael Self	Venturini Motorsports	Toyota	17.159	104.901
2	20	Chandler Smith	Venturini Motorsports	Toyota	17.232	104.457
3	15	Christian Eckes	Venturini Motorsports	Toyota	17.356	103.711
Full practice results

== Qualifying ==
Qualifying was held on Saturday, March 9, at 4:30 PM EST. Each driver would have two laps to set a fastest time; the fastest of the two would count as their official qualifying lap.

Chandler Smith of Venturini Motorsports would win the pole, setting a time of 16.990 and an average speed of 105.945 miles per hour (170.502 km/h).

=== Full qualifying results ===
Pos.	#	Driver	Team	Make	Time	Speed
1	20	Chandler Smith	Venturini Motorsports	Toyota	16.990	105.945
2	25	Michael Self	Venturini Motorsports	Toyota	16.992	105.932
3	28	Carson Hocevar	KBR Development	Chevrolet	17.025	105.727
4	22	Corey Heim	Chad Bryant Racing	Ford	17.072	105.436
5	23	Bret Holmes	Bret Holmes Racing	Chevrolet	17.079	105.393
6	19	Raphaël Lessard	KBR Development	Chevrolet	17.113	105.183
7	15	Christian Eckes	Venturini Motorsports	Toyota	17.151	104.950
8	54	Tanner Gray	DGR-Crosley	Toyota	17.180	104.773
9	38	Kaden Honeycutt	Kaden Honeycutt Racing	Ford	17.184	104.749
10	18	Ty Gibbs	Joe Gibbs Racing	Toyota	17.253	104.330
11	77	Joe Graf Jr.	Chad Bryant Racing	Ford	17.256	104.312
12	14	Connor Okrzesik	Connor Okrzesik Racing	Chevrolet	17.312	103.974
13	27	Travis Braden	RFMS Racing	Ford	17.354	103.722
14	21	Sam Mayer	GMS Racing	Chevrolet	17.369	103.633
15	10	Tommy Vigh Jr.	Fast Track Racing	Ford	18.515	97.218
16	48	Brad Smith	Brad Smith Motorsports	Ford	19.401	92.779
17	69	Mike Basham	Kimmel Racing	Ford	19.735	91.209
18	1	Dick Doheny	Fast Track Racing	Chevrolet	20.205	89.087
19	06	Tim Richmond	Wayne Peterson Racing	Dodge	20.984	85.780
20	11	Matt Dooley	Fast Track Racing	Ford	21.079	85.393
Official qualifying results

== Race results ==
Fin	St	#	Driver	Team	Make	Laps	Led	Status	Pts
1	2	25	Michael Self	Venturini Motorsports	Toyota	200	68	running	240
2	10	18	Ty Gibbs	Joe Gibbs Racing	Toyota	200	1	running	225
3	7	15	Christian Eckes	Venturini Motorsports	Toyota	200	0	running	215
4	1	20	Chandler Smith	Venturini Motorsports	Toyota	200	38	running	220
5	4	22	Corey Heim	Chad Bryant Racing	Ford	200	0	running	205
6	5	23	Bret Holmes	Bret Holmes Racing	Chevrolet	200	0	running	200
7	12	14	Connor Okrzesik	Connor Okrzesik Racing	Chevrolet	200	0	running	195
8	6	19	Raphaël Lessard	KBR Development	Chevrolet	200	83	running	200
9	9	38	Kaden Honeycutt	Kaden Honeycutt Racing	Ford	200	10	running	190
10	13	27	Travis Braden	RFMS Racing	Ford	199	0	running	180
11	11	77	Joe Graf Jr.	Chad Bryant Racing	Ford	198	0	running	175
12	8	54	Tanner Gray	DGR-Crosley	Toyota	197	0	running	170
13	15	10	Tommy Vigh Jr.	Fast Track Racing	Ford	191	0	running	165
14	19	06	Tim Richmond	Wayne Peterson Racing	Dodge	175	0	running	160
15	14	21	Sam Mayer	GMS Racing	Chevrolet	168	0	fuel pressure	155
16	16	48	Brad Smith	Brad Smith Motorsports	Ford	47	0	overheating	150
17	3	28	Carson Hocevar	KBR Development	Chevrolet	34	0	fuel pump	145
18	20	11	Matt Dooley	Fast Track Racing	Ford	21	0	handling	140
19	18	1	Dick Doheny	Fast Track Racing	Chevrolet	7	0	rear end	135
20	17	69	Mike Basham	Kimmel Racing	Ford	4	0	clutch	130
Withdrew
WD		73	Dale Shearer	Dale Shearer Racing	Ford				
Official race results

== Standings after the race ==
Drivers' Championship standings

	Pos	Driver	Points
1	1	Christian Eckes	435
4	2	Travis Braden	370 (-65)
15	3	Bret Holmes	340 (-95)
17	4	Joe Graf Jr.	300 (-135)
26	5	Michael Self	290 (-145)
13	6	Brad Smith	285 (-150)
16	7	Tommy Vigh Jr.	280 (-155)
8	8	Harrison Burton	245 (-190)
	9	Chandler Smith	220 (-215)
	10	Ty Gibbs	220 (-215)

- Note: Only the first 10 positions are included for the driver standings.

Previous race: 2019 Lucas Oil 200	ARCA Menards Series; 2019 season	Next race: 2019 Kentuckiana Ford Dealers ARCA 200
