= Dick Karth =

American racing driver

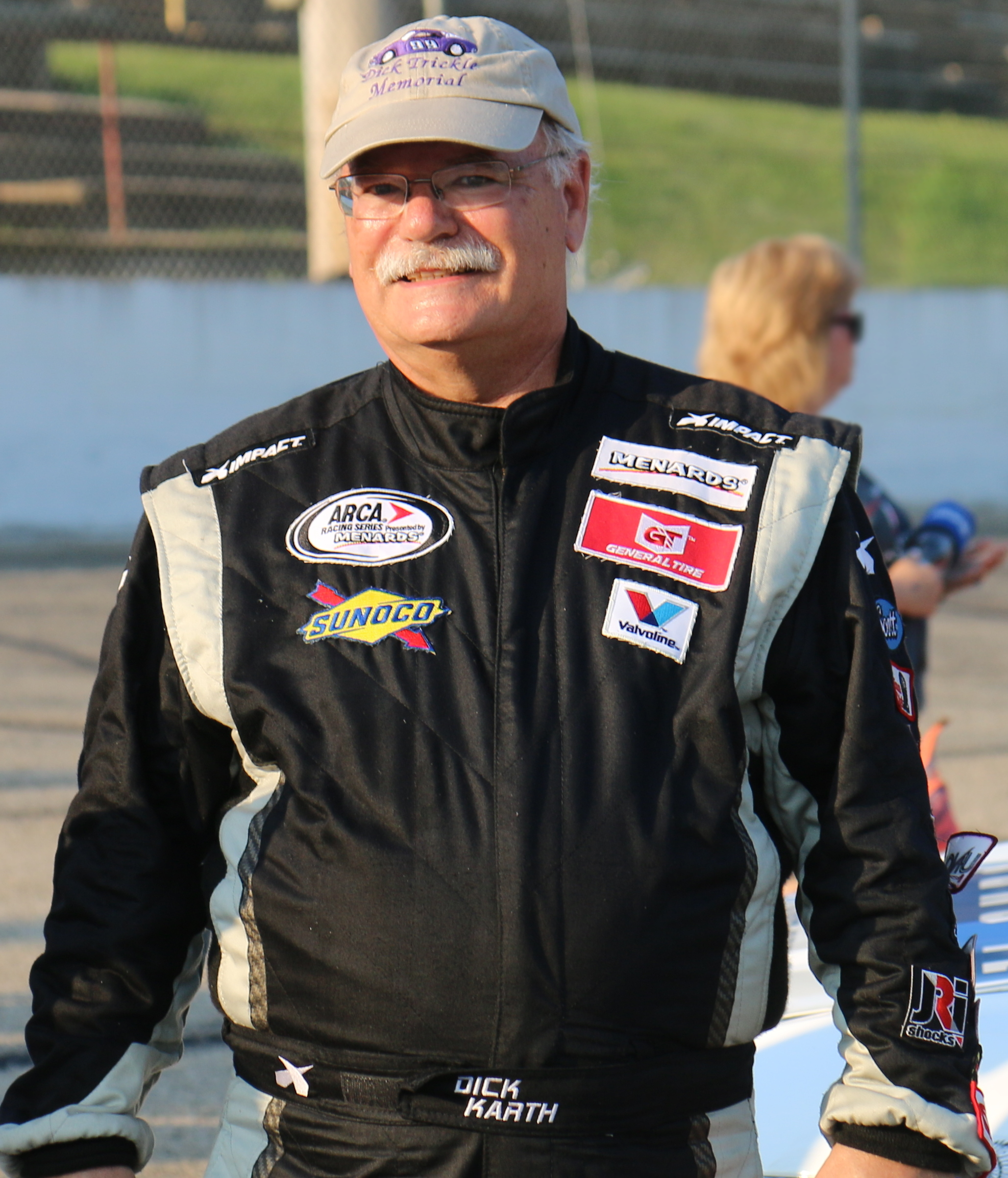
- Karth at Madison International Speedway in 2018
- Born: Richard J. Karth; December 13, 1952 (age 73); Grafton, Wisconsin, U.S.

NASCAR O'Reilly Auto Parts Series career
- 1 race run over 1 year
- 2019 position: 77th
- Best finish: 77th (2019)
- First race: 2019 CTECH Manufacturing 180 (Road America)
Wins	Top tens	Poles
0	0	0
- Statistics up to date as of April 5, 2020.

Richard J. Karth (born December 13, 1952) is an American professional historic motorsport and stock car racing driver. As a vintage racer, he pilots the No. 90 formerly owned by Donlavey Racing in conjunction with the Midwestern Council of Sports Car Clubs. He last competed part-time in the NASCAR Xfinity Series, driving the No. 61 Chevrolet Camaro for MBM Motorsports.

== Vintage racing ==
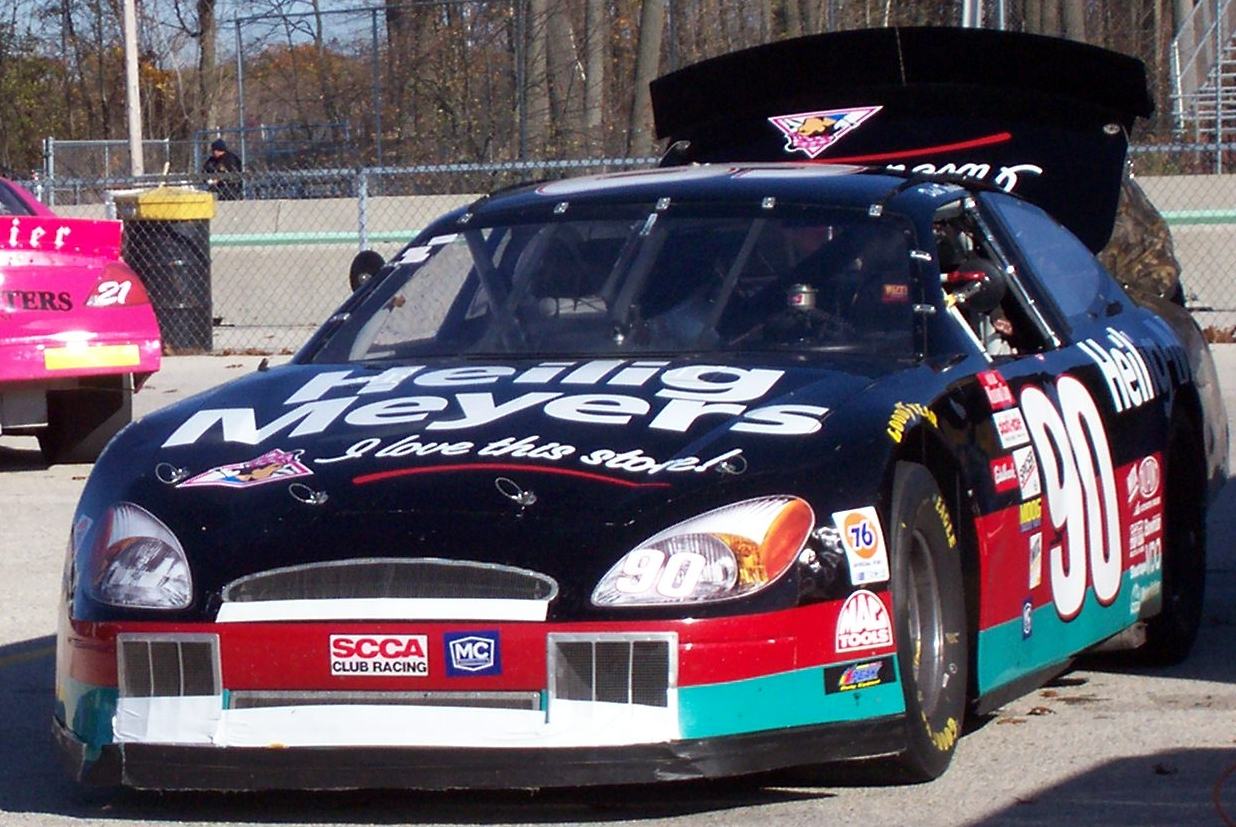
Karth's No. 90 Dick Trickle car in 2007

Growing up a racing fan, Karth watched quarter midget events at the Shawano County, Wisconsin fairgrounds alongside his father and uncle who owned a funeral home that operated an ambulance for drivers. He began regularly attending the Indianapolis 500 in 1968.

In 2005, Karth acquired the No. 90 NASCAR stock car formerly driven by Dick Trickle of Donlavey Racing; Karth and Trickle befriended each other in the 1980s thanks to a mutual friend. With the car, he started competing in vintage racing for the Midwestern Council of Sports Car Clubs.

Karth is a member of the Southeastern Wisconsin Short Track Hall of Fame's Board of Directors.

== ARCA and NASCAR career ==
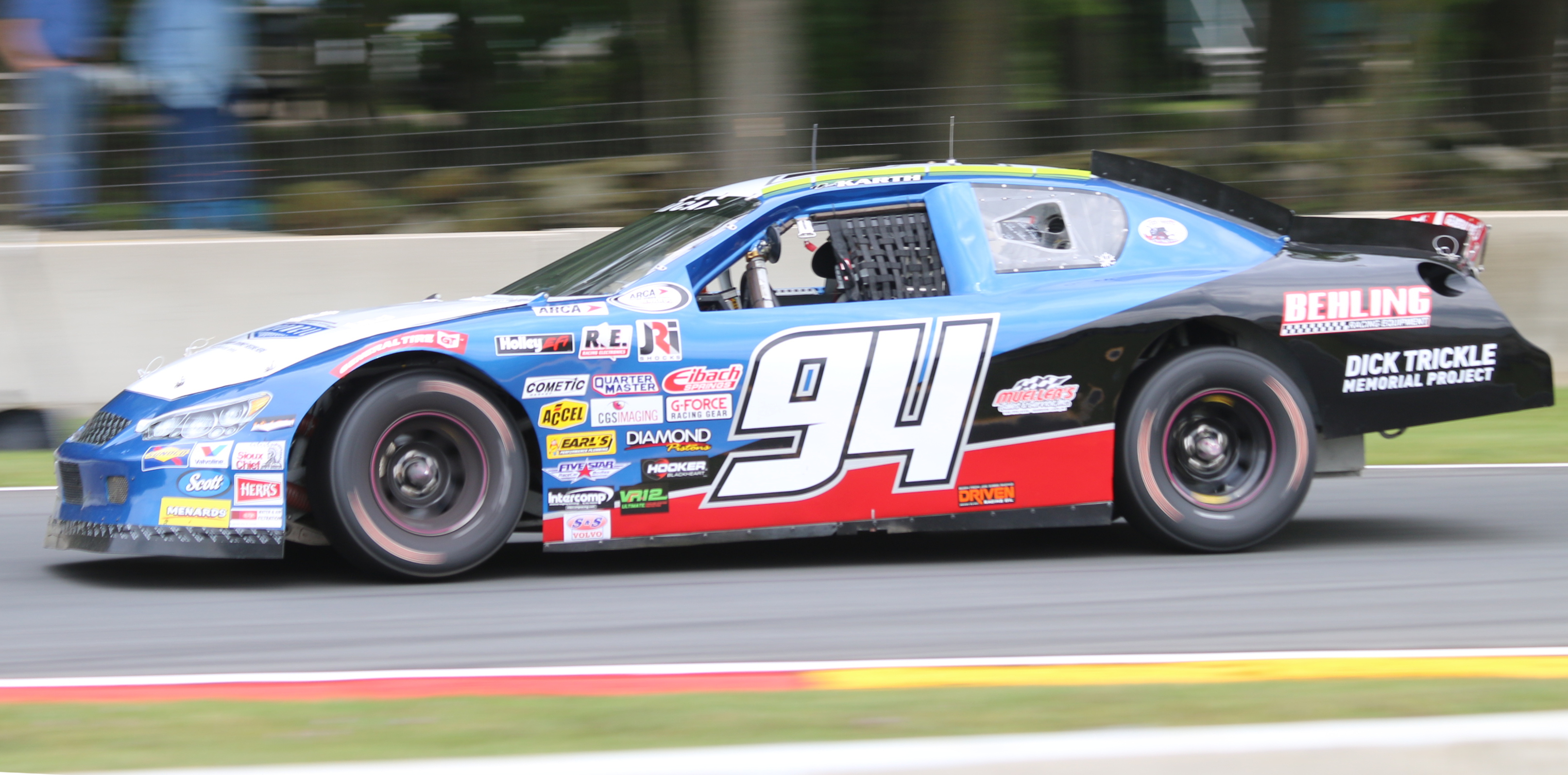
Karth's No. 94 ARCA car at Road America in 2017

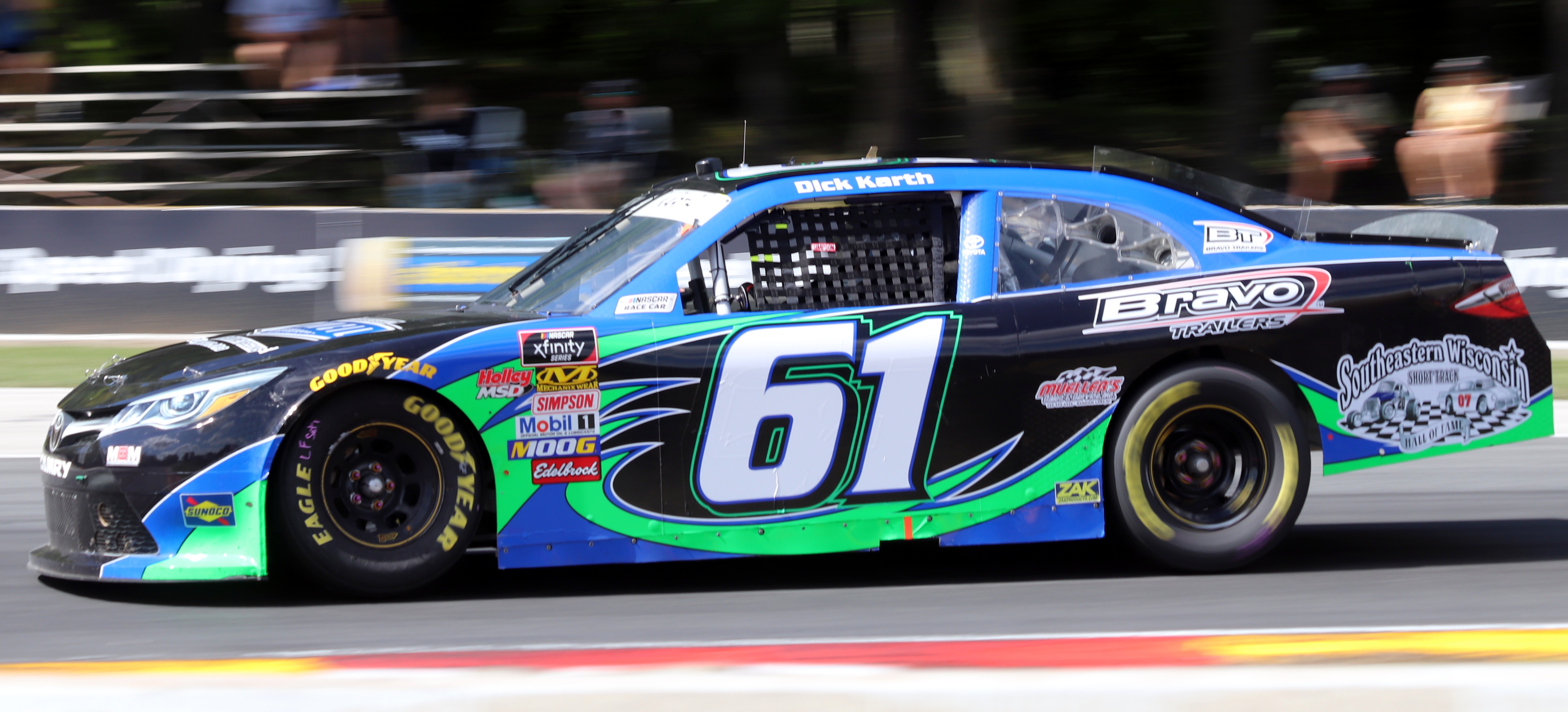
Karth's No. 61 Xfinity car

During the 2000s, Karth worked as a crewman for various NASCAR teams, including Dexter Bean's NASCAR Cup Series crew.

In 2013, Karth received a road course license to participate in the ARCA Racing Series at Road America, but was unable to compete as his car failed to start. He returned to the series in 2017, where he finished 21st in his ARCA debut at Road America. The following year, he tested a car for Mullins Racing at Daytona International Speedway; he was 56th fastest. He continued racing in his home state at the Madison International Speedway events in 2018 and 2019 with Fast Track Racing Enterprises, finishing 18th and 16th, respectively.

In August 2019, MBM Motorsports announced Karth would make his NASCAR Xfinity Series debut with the team in the CTECH Manufacturing 180 at Road America; with Karth at the age of 66, MBM stated their pride in being a "gateway for so many racers, young and old, to accomplish their goals." Driving the No. 61 Toyota Camry with Dick Trickle Memorial Project branding, he remained on the lead lap through the opening stage before being substituted for Timmy Hill for the rest of the race; Hill finished 30th, though Karth received the points as he started the race.

== Motorsports career results ==
=== NASCAR ===
(key) (Bold – Pole position awarded by qualifying time. Italics – Pole position earned by points standings or practice time. * – Most laps led.)

==== Xfinity Series ====
NASCAR Xfinity Series results
Year	Team	No.	Make	1	2	3	4	5	6	7	8	9	10	11	12	13	14	15	16	17	18	19	20	21	22	23	24	25	26	27	28	29	30	31	32	33	NXSC	Pts	Ref
2019	MBM Motorsports	61	Toyota	DAY	ATL	LVS	PHO	CAL	TEX	BRI	RCH	TAL	DOV	CLT	POC	MCH	IOW	CHI	DAY	KEN	NHA	IOW	GLN	MOH	BRI	ROA; 30	DAR	IND	LVS	RCH	ROV	DOV	KAN	TEX	PHO	HOM	77th	7	

=== ARCA Menards Series ===
(key) (Bold – Pole position awarded by qualifying time. Italics – Pole position earned by points standings or practice time. * – Most laps led.)

ARCA Menards Series results
Year	Team	No.	Make	1	2	3	4	5	6	7	8	9	10	11	12	13	14	15	16	17	18	19	20	21	AMSC	Pts	Ref
2013	Karth Racing	72	Chevy	DAY	MOB	SLM	TAL	TOL	ELK	POC	MCH	ROA; 27	WIN	CHI	NJE	POC	BLN	ISF	MAD	DSF	IOW	SLM	KEN	KAN	NA	-	
2017	Karth Racing	94	Chevy	DAY	NSH	SLM	TAL	TOL	ELK	POC	MCH	MAD	IOW	IRP	POC	WIN	ISF	ROA; 21	DSF	SLM	CHI	KEN	KAN		103rd	125	
2018	Fast Track Racing Enterprises	11	Ford	DAY	NSH	SLM	TAL	TOL	CLT	POC	MCH	MAD; 18	GTW	CHI	IOW	ELK	BLN	POC	ISF	DSF	IRP	SLM	KAN		95th	140	
2019	Fast Track Racing Enterprises	11	Ford	DAY	FIF	SLM	TAL	NSH	TOL	CLT	POC	MCH	MAD; 16	GTW	CHI	ELK	IOW	POC	ISF	DSF	SLM	IRP	KAN		68th	150	

^{*} Season still in progress
^{1} Ineligible for series points
