= 2019 General Tire 200 =

Fourth race of the 2019 ARCA Menards Series

Race details
- Race 4 of 20 in the 2019 ARCA Menards Series
- Date: April 26, 2019
- Official name: 57th Annual General Tire 200
- Location: Talladega, Alabama, Talladega Superspeedway
- Course: Permanent racing facility
- Course length: 2.66 miles (325.344 km)
- Distance: 76 laps, 202.16 mi (325.344 km)
- Scheduled distance: 76 laps, 202.16 mi (325.344 km)
- Average speed: 141.426 miles per hour (227.603 km/h)

Pole position
| Driver | Brandon Lynn | Venturini Motorsports |
- Time: 53.298

Most laps led
| Driver | Sean Corr | Empire Racing |
- Laps: 35

Winner
| No. 4 | Todd Gilliland | DGR-Crosley |

Television in the United States
- Network: Fox Sports 1
- Announcers: David Rieff, Phil Parsons

Radio in the United States
- Radio: Motor Racing Network

The 2019 General Tire 200 was the fourth stock car race of the 2019 ARCA Menards Series season and the 57th iteration of the event. The race was held on Friday, April 26, 2019, in Lincoln, Alabama at Talladega Superspeedway, a 2.66 miles (4.28 km) permanent triangle-shaped superspeedway. The race took the scheduled 76 laps to complete. At race's end, Todd Gilliland of DGR-Crosley would dominate the late stages of the race to win his second and to date, final career ARCA Menards Series race and his first and only win of the season. To fill out the podium, Ty Majeski of Chad Bryant Racing and Andy Seuss of Our Motorsports would finish second and third, respectively.

== Background ==
Talladega Superspeedway, originally known as Alabama International Motor Superspeedway (AIMS), is a motorsports complex located north of Talladega, Alabama. It is located on the former Anniston Air Force Base in the small city of Lincoln. The track is a tri-oval and was constructed in the 1960s by the International Speedway Corporation, a business controlled by the France family. Talladega is most known for its steep banking and the unique location of the start/finish line that's located just past the exit to pit road. The track currently hosts the NASCAR series such as the NASCAR Cup Series, Xfinity Series and the Gander RV & Outdoors Truck Series. Talladega is the longest NASCAR oval with a length of 2.66-mile-long (4.28 km) tri-oval like the Daytona International Speedway, which also is a 2.5-mile-long (4 km) tri-oval.

=== Entry list ===
| # | Driver | Team | Make | Sponsor |
|---|---|---|---|---|
| 1 | Ed Pompa | Fast Track Racing | Chevrolet | Clemson National Champions |
| 02 | Andy Seuss | Our Motorsports | Chevrolet | Canto Printing, Robert B. Our Co. |
| 4 | Todd Gilliland | DGR-Crosley | Toyota | Frontline Enterprises, Inc. |
| 5 | Bobby Gerhart | Bobby Gerhart Racing | Chevrolet | Lucas Oil |
| 06 | Con Nicolopoulos | Wayne Peterson Racing | Chevrolet | Great Railing |
| 9 | Thomas Praytor | Max Force Racing | Chevrolet | Max Force Trucking, AIDB |
| 09 | C. J. McLaughlin | Our Motorsports | Chevrolet | SciAps |
| 10 | Tommy Vigh Jr. | Fast Track Racing | Toyota | Extreme Kleaner |
| 11 | D. L. Wilson | Fast Track Racing | Toyota | Cen-Tex Roof Systems |
| 15 | Christian Eckes | Venturini Motorsports | Toyota | JBL |
| 18 | Riley Herbst | Joe Gibbs Racing | Toyota | Monster Energy |
| 20 | Brandon Lynn | Venturini Motorsports | Toyota | Carolina Excavation & Grading |
| 22 | Ty Majeski | Chad Bryant Racing | Ford | Chad Bryant Racing |
| 23 | Bret Holmes | Bret Holmes Racing | Chevrolet | Holmes II Excavating |
| 25 | Michael Self | Venturini Motorsports | Toyota | Sinclair |
| 27 | Travis Braden | RFMS Racing | Ford | MatrixCare |
| 28 | Brandon McReynolds | KBR Development | Chevrolet | ABM Building Value, Heritage Homes |
| 30 | Grant Quinlan | Rette Jones Racing | Ford | Jones Demolition & Abatement |
| 32 | Gus Dean | Win-Tron Racing | Chevrolet | Baker Distributing Company, Nu-Calgon |
| 43 | Sean Corr | Empire Racing | Chevrolet | Nesco, Navy Seals Foundation |
| 46 | Thad Moffitt | Empire Racing | Chevrolet | The Transportation Impact |
| 48 | Brad Smith | Brad Smith Motorsports | Chevrolet | Brad Smith Motorsports |
| 54 | Natalie Decker | DGR-Crosley | Toyota | N29 Technologies, LLC |
| 57 | Bryan Dauzat | Brother-In-Law Racing | Chevrolet | O.B. Builders Door & Trim |
| 69 | Scott Melton | Kimmel Racing | Ford | Melton-McFadden Insurance Agency |
| 77 | Joe Graf Jr. | Chad Bryant Racing | Ford | Eat Sleep Race |
Official entry list

== Practice ==
The only 30-minute practice session was held on Friday, April 26, at 9:30 AM EST. Michael Self of Venturini Motorsports would set the fastest time in the session, with a time of 52.886 and an average speed of 181.069 miles per hour (291.402 km/h).

| Pos. | # | Driver | Team | Make | Time | Speed |
|---|---|---|---|---|---|---|
| 1 | 25 | Michael Self | Venturini Motorsports | Toyota | 52.886 | 181.069 |
| 2 | 15 | Christian Eckes | Venturini Motorsports | Toyota | 52.923 | 180.942 |
| 3 | 20 | Brandon Lynn | Venturini Motorsports | Toyota | 52.930 | 180.918 |
Full practice results

== Qualifying ==
Qualifying was held on Friday, April 26, at 3:30 PM EST. Each driver would have two laps to set a fastest time; the fastest of the two would count as their official qualifying lap.

Brandon Lynn of Venturini Motorsports would win the pole, setting a time of 53.298 and an average speed of 179.669 miles per hour (289.149 km/h).

=== Full qualifying results ===
| Pos. | # | Driver | Team | Make | Time | Speed |
|---|---|---|---|---|---|---|
| 1 | 20 | Brandon Lynn | Venturini Motorsports | Toyota | 53.298 | 179.669 |
| 2 | 22 | Ty Majeski | Chad Bryant Racing | Ford | 53.313 | 179.618 |
| 3 | 02 | Andy Seuss | Our Motorsports | Chevrolet | 53.320 | 179.595 |
| 4 | 32 | Gus Dean | Win-Tron Racing | Chevrolet | 53.332 | 179.554 |
| 5 | 25 | Michael Self | Venturini Motorsports | Toyota | 53.470 | 179.091 |
| 6 | 18 | Riley Herbst | Joe Gibbs Racing | Toyota | 53.477 | 179.068 |
| 7 | 28 | Brandon McReynolds | KBR Development | Chevrolet | 53.488 | 179.031 |
| 8 | 43 | Sean Corr | Empire Racing | Chevrolet | 53.492 | 179.017 |
| 9 | 77 | Joe Graf Jr. | Chad Bryant Racing | Ford | 53.494 | 179.011 |
| 10 | 30 | Grant Quinlan | Rette Jones Racing | Ford | 53.506 | 178.971 |
| 11 | 46 | Thad Moffitt | Empire Racing | Chevrolet | 53.604 | 178.643 |
| 12 | 15 | Christian Eckes | Venturini Motorsports | Toyota | 53.629 | 178.560 |
| 13 | 09 | C. J. McLaughlin | Our Motorsports | Chevrolet | 53.634 | 178.543 |
| 14 | 27 | Travis Braden | RFMS Racing | Ford | 53.663 | 178.447 |
| 15 | 4 | Todd Gilliland | DGR-Crosley | Toyota | 53.690 | 178.357 |
| 16 | 23 | Bret Holmes | Bret Holmes Racing | Chevrolet | 53.691 | 178.354 |
| 17 | 5 | Bobby Gerhart | Bobby Gerhart Racing | Chevrolet | 53.843 | 177.850 |
| 18 | 9 | Thomas Praytor | Max Force Racing | Chevrolet | 54.174 | 176.764 |
| 19 | 69 | Scott Melton | Kimmel Racing | Ford | 54.215 | 176.630 |
| 20 | 54 | Natalie Decker | DGR-Crosley | Toyota | 54.258 | 176.490 |
| 21 | 57 | Bryan Dauzat | Brother-In-Law Racing | Chevrolet | 54.331 | 176.253 |
| 22 | 1 | Ed Pompa | Fast Track Racing | Chevrolet | 54.404 | 176.016 |
| 23 | 11 | D. L. Wilson | Fast Track Racing | Toyota | 56.221 | 170.328 |
| 24 | 48 | Brad Smith | Brad Smith Motorsports | Chevrolet | 56.269 | 170.183 |
| 25 | 10 | Tommy Vigh Jr. | Fast Track Racing | Toyota | 56.690 | 168.919 |
| 26 | 06 | Con Nicolopoulos | Wayne Peterson Racing | Chevrolet | 57.488 | 166.574 |
Official qualifying results

== Race results ==
| Fin | St | # | Driver | Team | Make | Laps | Led | Status | Pts |
|---|---|---|---|---|---|---|---|---|---|
| 1 | 15 | 4 | Todd Gilliland | DGR-Crosley | Toyota | 76 | 34 | running | 240 |
| 2 | 6 | 18 | Riley Herbst | Joe Gibbs Racing | Toyota | 76 | 0 | running | 220 |
| 3 | 1 | 20 | Brandon Lynn | Venturini Motorsports | Toyota | 76 | 0 | running | 220 |
| 4 | 2 | 22 | Ty Majeski | Chad Bryant Racing | Ford | 76 | 0 | running | 210 |
| 5 | 5 | 25 | Michael Self | Venturini Motorsports | Toyota | 76 | 0 | running | 205 |
| 6 | 4 | 32 | Gus Dean | Win-Tron Racing | Chevrolet | 76 | 4 | running | 205 |
| 7 | 14 | 27 | Travis Braden | RFMS Racing | Ford | 76 | 0 | running | 195 |
| 8 | 3 | 02 | Andy Seuss | Our Motorsports | Chevrolet | 76 | 0 | running | 190 |
| 9 | 10 | 30 | Grant Quinlan | Rette Jones Racing | Ford | 76 | 0 | running | 185 |
| 10 | 9 | 77 | Joe Graf Jr. | Chad Bryant Racing | Ford | 76 | 3 | running | 185 |
| 11 | 13 | 09 | C. J. McLaughlin | Our Motorsports | Chevrolet | 76 | 0 | running | 175 |
| 12 | 21 | 57 | Bryan Dauzat | Brother-In-Law Racing | Chevrolet | 76 | 0 | running | 170 |
| 13 | 17 | 5 | Bobby Gerhart | Bobby Gerhart Racing | Chevrolet | 76 | 0 | running | 165 |
| 14 | 16 | 23 | Bret Holmes | Bret Holmes Racing | Chevrolet | 76 | 0 | running | 160 |
| 15 | 8 | 43 | Sean Corr | Empire Racing | Chevrolet | 76 | 35 | running | 165 |
| 16 | 24 | 48 | Brad Smith | Brad Smith Motorsports | Chevrolet | 75 | 0 | running | 150 |
| 17 | 23 | 11 | D. L. Wilson | Fast Track Racing | Toyota | 74 | 0 | running | 145 |
| 18 | 19 | 69 | Scott Melton | Kimmel Racing | Ford | 74 | 0 | running | 140 |
| 19 | 7 | 28 | Brandon McReynolds | KBR Development | Chevrolet | 74 | 0 | running | 135 |
| 20 | 18 | 9 | Thomas Praytor | Max Force Racing | Chevrolet | 73 | 0 | transmission | 130 |
| 21 | 22 | 1 | Ed Pompa | Fast Track Racing | Chevrolet | 73 | 0 | running | 125 |
| 22 | 26 | 06 | Con Nicolopoulos | Wayne Peterson Racing | Chevrolet | 72 | 0 | running | 120 |
| 23 | 20 | 54 | Natalie Decker | DGR-Crosley | Toyota | 72 | 0 | running | 115 |
| 24 | 25 | 10 | Tommy Vigh Jr. | Fast Track Racing | Toyota | 48 | 0 | crash | 110 |
| 25 | 11 | 46 | Thad Moffitt | Empire Racing | Chevrolet | 41 | 0 | oil line | 105 |
| 26 | 12 | 15 | Christian Eckes | Venturini Motorsports | Toyota | 39 | 0 | crash | 100 |
Official race results

== Standings after the race ==
Drivers' Championship standings

| | Pos | Driver | Points |
|---|---|---|---|
| 1 | 1 | Michael Self | 740 |
| 1 | 2 | Travis Braden | 735 (-5) |
| | 3 | Bret Holmes | 680 (-60) |
| | 4 | Joe Graf Jr. | 670 (-70) |
| 5 | 5 | Brad Smith | 570 (-170) |
| | 6 | Tommy Vigh Jr. | 565 (-175) |
| 2 | 7 | Christian Eckes | 560 (-180) |
| 1 | 8 | Chandler Smith | 435 (-305) |
| 1 | 9 | Harrison Burton | 435 (-305) |
| 1 | 10 | Ty Gibbs | 425 (-315) |

- Note: Only the first 10 positions are included for the driver standings.

| Previous race: 2019 Kentuckiana Ford Dealers ARCA 200 | ARCA Menards Series; 2019 season | Next race: 2019 Music City 200 |
