= 2018 ARCA Racing Series =

66th season of the ARCA Racing Series

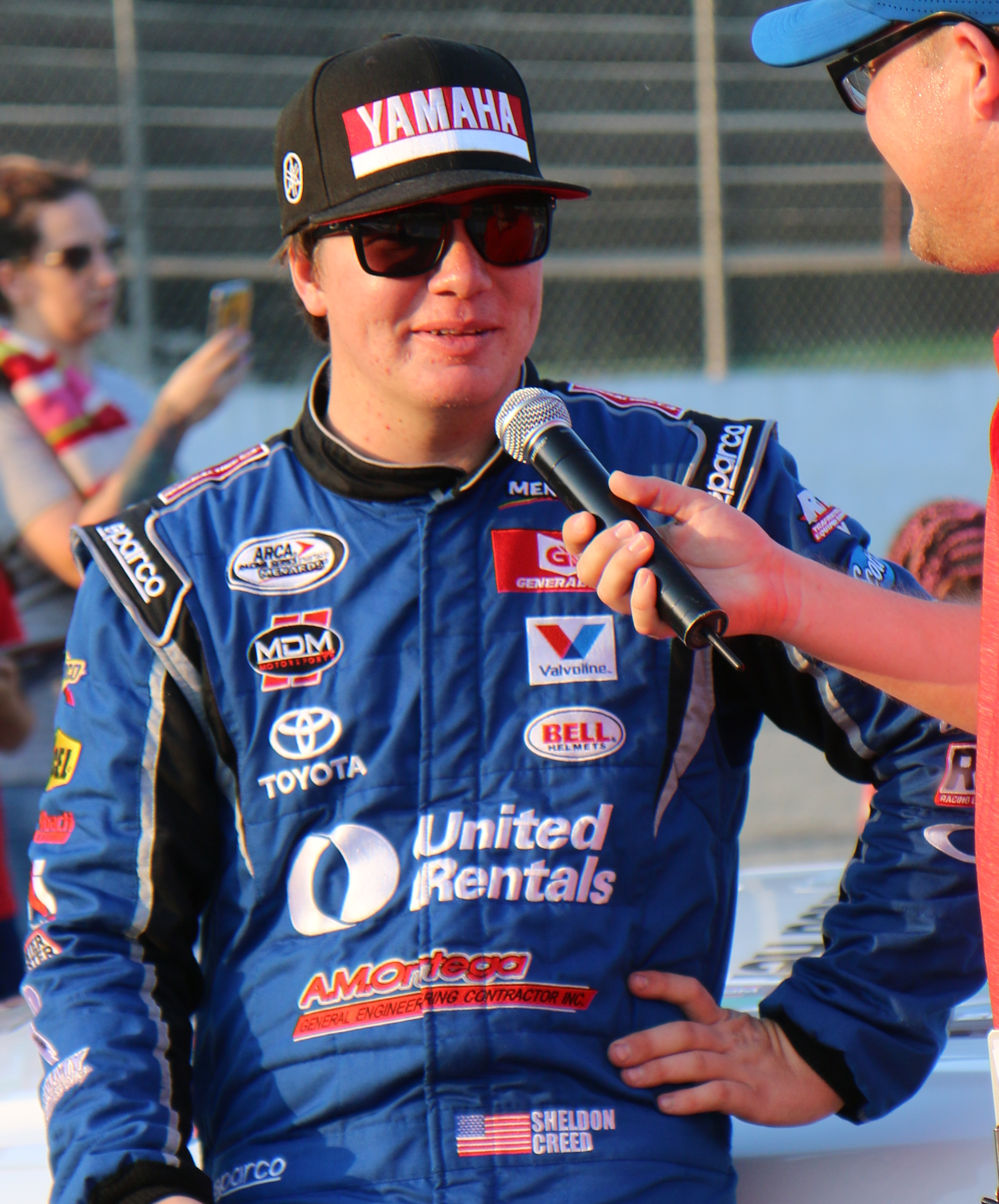
Sheldon Creed, the 2018 ARCA champion.

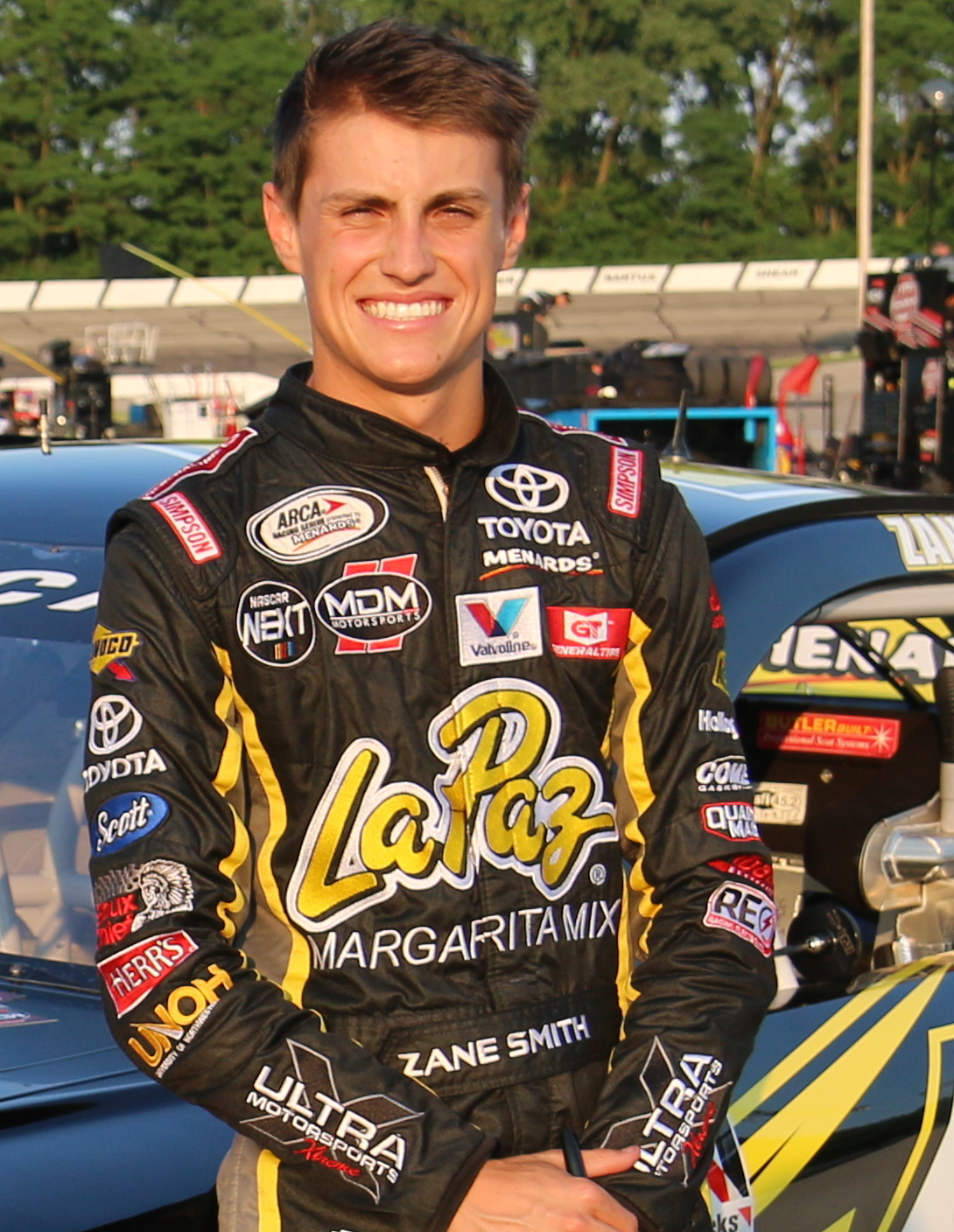
Zane Smith finished second behind Creed in the championship.

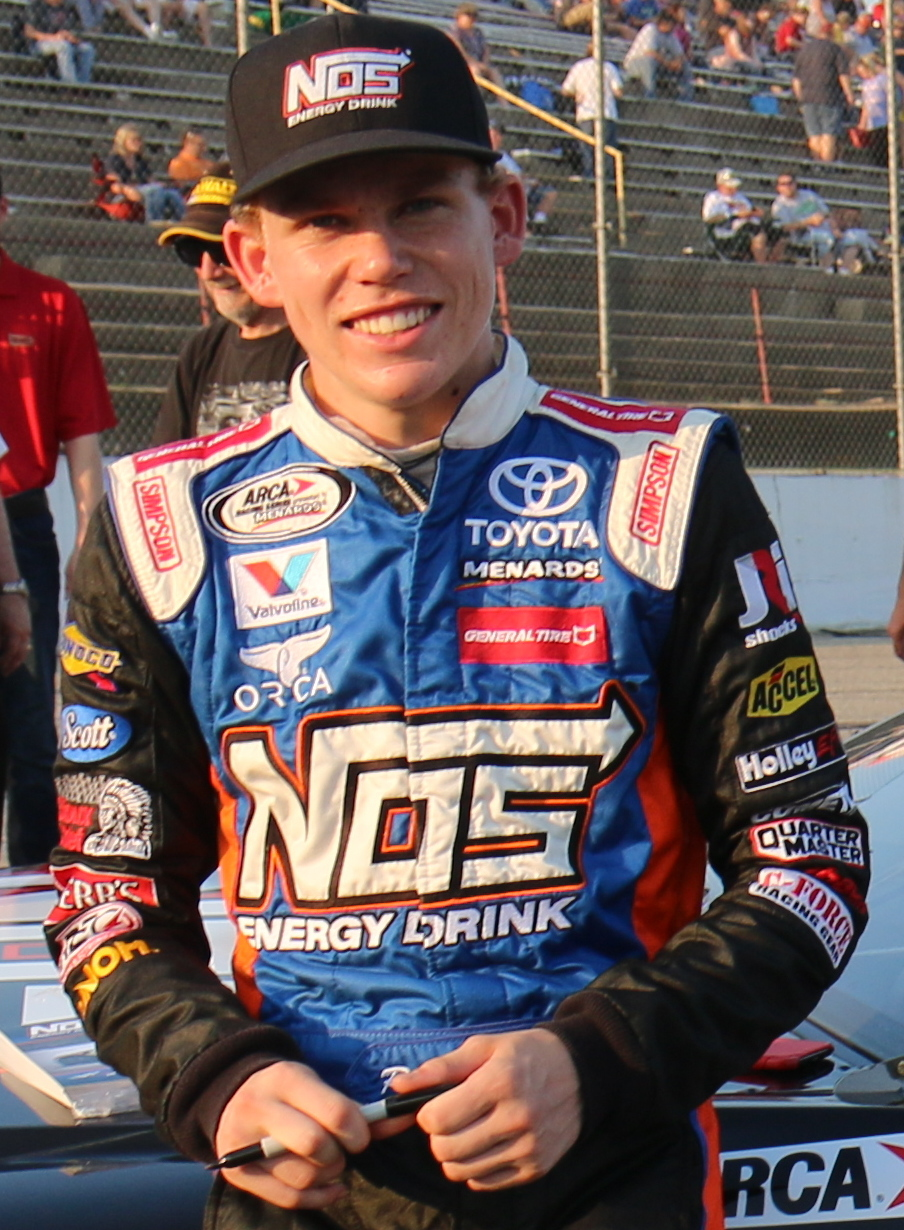
Riley Herbst finished third in the championship.

The 2018 ARCA Racing Series presented by Menards was the 66th season of the ARCA Racing Series. The season began on February 10 with the Lucas Oil 200 driven by General Tire at Daytona International Speedway and ended on October 19 with the Kansas ARCA 150. Races were broadcast on FS1, FS2 and MAVTV. Sheldon Creed won the championship, ahead of his MDM Motorsports teammate Zane Smith.

== Teams and drivers ==
=== Complete schedule ===
| Manufacturer | Team | No. | Driver |
|---|---|---|---|
| Chevrolet | Patriot Motorsports Group 5 Darrell Basham Racing 15 | 34 | Jesse Iwuji 5 (Note: Iwuji's races were Patriot Motorsports Group entries using Darrell Basham Racing's owner points.) |
| Chevrolet | Patriot Motorsports Group 5 Darrell Basham Racing 15 | 34 | Mike Basham 14 |
| Chevrolet | Patriot Motorsports Group 5 Darrell Basham Racing 15 | 34 | Darrell Basham 1 |
| Chevrolet | Win-Tron Racing | 32 | Gus Dean |
| Ford | Chad Bryant Racing | 77 | Bo LeMastus 1 |
| Ford | Chad Bryant Racing | 77 | Joe Graf Jr. (R) 19 |
| Ford | James Hylton Motorsports 4 Brad Smith Motorsports 16 | 48 | Brad Smith |
| Ford | RFMS Racing | 27 | Travis Braden (R) |
| Toyota | Joe Gibbs Racing | 18 | Riley Herbst |
| Toyota | MDM Motorsports | 8 | Chase Purdy (R) |
| Toyota | MDM Motorsports | 28 | Sheldon Creed |
| Toyota | MDM Motorsports | 41 | Zane Smith (R) |
| Toyota | Venturini Motorsports | 15 | Michael Self 6 |
| Toyota | Venturini Motorsports | 15 | Christian Eckes 13 |
| Toyota | Venturini Motorsports | 15 | Chandler Smith 1 |
| Toyota | Venturini Motorsports | 20 | Leilani Münter 8 |
| Toyota | Venturini Motorsports | 20 | Chandler Smith 8 |
| Toyota | Venturini Motorsports | 20 | Eddie Fatscher 1 |
| Toyota | Venturini Motorsports | 20 | Toni Breidinger 1 |
| Toyota | Venturini Motorsports | 20 | Logan Seavey 2 |
| Toyota | Venturini Motorsports | 25 | Natalie Decker (R) |
| Chevrolet 3 Toyota 15 Ford 2 | Fast Track Racing | 10 | Tony Mrakovich 2 |
| Chevrolet 3 Toyota 15 Ford 2 | Fast Track Racing | 10 | Rick Clifton 3 (Note: Rick Clifton was scheduled to drive the No. 10 Toyota at Berlin Raceway on July 21 and the No. 11 Ford at Lucas Oil Raceway at Indianapolis on September 7 for Fast Track Racing but since the races were postponed, he didn't return and Tyler Hill replaced him in both races.) |
| Chevrolet 3 Toyota 15 Ford 2 | Fast Track Racing | 10 | Dick Doheny 1 |
| Chevrolet 3 Toyota 15 Ford 2 | Fast Track Racing | 10 | D. L. Wilson 1 |
| Chevrolet 3 Toyota 15 Ford 2 | Fast Track Racing | 10 | Tom Berte 3 |
| Chevrolet 3 Toyota 15 Ford 2 | Fast Track Racing | 10 | Ed Pompa 1 |
| Chevrolet 3 Toyota 15 Ford 2 | Fast Track Racing | 10 | Tommy Vigh Jr. 3 |
| Chevrolet 3 Toyota 15 Ford 2 | Fast Track Racing | 10 | Matt Dooley 1 |
| Chevrolet 3 Toyota 15 Ford 2 | Fast Track Racing | 10 | Darrell Basham 1 |
| Chevrolet 3 Toyota 15 Ford 2 | Fast Track Racing | 10 | Tyler Hill 3 |
| Chevrolet 3 Toyota 15 Ford 2 | Fast Track Racing | 10 | C. J. McLaughlin 1 |
| Toyota 6 Chevrolet 4 Ford 10 | Hillenburg-Schrader Racing 2 Fast Track Racing 18 | 11 | Brandon Grosso (R) 1 |
| Toyota 6 Chevrolet 4 Ford 10 | Hillenburg-Schrader Racing 2 Fast Track Racing 18 | 11 | D. L. Wilson 1 |
| Toyota 6 Chevrolet 4 Ford 10 | Hillenburg-Schrader Racing 2 Fast Track Racing 18 | 11 | Matt Dooley 1 |
| Toyota 6 Chevrolet 4 Ford 10 | Hillenburg-Schrader Racing 2 Fast Track Racing 18 | 11 | Ed Pompa 3 |
| Toyota 6 Chevrolet 4 Ford 10 | Hillenburg-Schrader Racing 2 Fast Track Racing 18 | 11 | Rick Clifton 1 |
| Toyota 6 Chevrolet 4 Ford 10 | Hillenburg-Schrader Racing 2 Fast Track Racing 18 | 11 | Will Rodgers 1 |
| Toyota 6 Chevrolet 4 Ford 10 | Hillenburg-Schrader Racing 2 Fast Track Racing 18 | 11 | Tony Mrakovich 1 |
| Toyota 6 Chevrolet 4 Ford 10 | Hillenburg-Schrader Racing 2 Fast Track Racing 18 | 11 | Morgen Baird 1 |
| Toyota 6 Chevrolet 4 Ford 10 | Hillenburg-Schrader Racing 2 Fast Track Racing 18 | 11 | Dick Karth 1 |
| Toyota 6 Chevrolet 4 Ford 10 | Hillenburg-Schrader Racing 2 Fast Track Racing 18 | 11 | Dick Doheny 6 |
| Toyota 6 Chevrolet 4 Ford 10 | Hillenburg-Schrader Racing 2 Fast Track Racing 18 | 11 | Zach Ralston 2 (Note: Entries were fielded in a collaboration with ZR Racing.) |
| Toyota 6 Chevrolet 4 Ford 10 | Hillenburg-Schrader Racing 2 Fast Track Racing 18 | 11 | Tyler Hill 1 |
| Toyota 1 Dodge 9 Chevrolet 1 Ford 9 | Wayne Peterson Racing | 06 | Chuck Hiers 1 (Note: It was a Fast Track Racing entry using Wayne Peterson Racing's owner points.) |
| Toyota 1 Dodge 9 Chevrolet 1 Ford 9 | Wayne Peterson Racing | 06 | Con Nicolopoulos 15 |
| Toyota 1 Dodge 9 Chevrolet 1 Ford 9 | Wayne Peterson Racing | 06 | Don Thompson 2 |
| Toyota 1 Dodge 9 Chevrolet 1 Ford 9 | Wayne Peterson Racing | 06 | Buck Stevens 2 |

=== Limited schedule ===
| Manufacturer | Team | No. | Driver | Rounds |
|---|---|---|---|---|
| Chevrolet | Allgaier Motorsports | 16 | Kelly Kovski | 2 |
| Chevrolet | Bret Holmes Racing | 23 | Bret Holmes | 11 |
| Chevrolet | Wayne Peterson Racing (Note: Peterson's races were Wayne Peterson Racing entries using Bret Holmes Racing's owner points.) | 23 | Wayne Peterson | 2 |
| Chevrolet | Wayne Peterson Racing | 6 | Dale Matchett | 1 |
| Chevrolet | Bobby Gerhart Racing | 5 | Bobby Gerhart | 7 (Note: Bobby Gerhart was scheduled to run at Berlin Raceway on July 21 but since the race was postponed to August 25, he didn't return and was scored last as did not start in the postponed race.) |
| Chevrolet | Brother-In-Law Racing | 57 | Bryan Dauzat | 5 |
| Chevrolet | Chad Finley Racing | 51 | Austin Hill | 1 |
| Chevrolet | Chad Finley Racing | 51 | Chad Finley | 1 |
| Chevrolet | Grant County Mulch Racing | 7 | Codie Rohrbaugh | 8 |
| Chevrolet | Grynewicz Motorsports | 40 | Tovia Grynewicz | 1 |
| Chevrolet | KBR Development | 35 | Carson Hocevar | 3 |
| Chevrolet | Kimmel-Finney Racing | 69 | Scott Reeves | 1 |
| Chevrolet | Mason Mitchell Motorsports | 78 | Max Tullman | 8 |
| Chevrolet | Mason Mitchell Motorsports | 78 | Ryan Repko | 1 |
| Chevrolet | Mason Mitchell Motorsports | 78 | Colby Howard | 2 |
| Chevrolet | Mason Mitchell Motorsports | 78 | Grant Enfinger | 1 |
| Chevrolet | Mason Mitchell Motorsports | 78 | Blaine Perkins | 1 |
| Chevrolet | Mason Mitchell Motorsports | 78 | Quin Houff | 1 |
| Chevrolet | Mason Mitchell Motorsports | 98 | Quin Houff | 3 |
| Chevrolet | Mason Mitchell Motorsports | 98 | Blaine Perkins | 3 |
| Chevrolet | Mason Mitchell Motorsports | 98 | Mason Mitchell | 1 |
| Chevrolet | Norm Hutton Racing | 37 | Kirk Horton | 1 |
| Chevrolet | Our Motorsports | 02 | Andy Seuss | 3 |
| Chevrolet | Our Motorsports | 6 | Josh Williams | 1 |
| Chevrolet | Patriot Motorsports Group | 38 | Jerry de Weerdt | 1 |
| Chevrolet | Patriot Motorsports Group | 38 | Rob Powers | 1 |
| Chevrolet | Patriot Motorsports Group | 38 | Salvatore Iovino | 1 |
| Chevrolet | Spraker Racing Enterprises | 63 | Dave Mader III | 3 |
| Chevrolet | Win-Tron Racing | 33 | Daniel Sasnett | 1 |
| Chevrolet | Win-Tron Racing | 33 | Cole Glasson | 1 |
| Chevrolet | ZR Racing (Note: Entry was fielded in a collaboration with Fast Track Racing.) | 1 | Zach Ralston | 1 |
| Dodge | Hixson Motorsports | 2 | Eric Caudell | 5 |
| Ford | Chad Bryant Racing | 22 | Tyler Dippel | 2 |
| Ford | Chad Bryant Racing | 22 | Josh Berry | 1 |
| Ford | Chad Bryant Racing | 22 | Tom Hessert III | 1 |
| Ford | Clubb Racing | 03 | Alex Clubb | 3 |
| Ford | Dale Shearer Racing | 73 | Dale Shearer | 1 |
| Ford | Dale Shearer Racing | 73 | Darrell Basham | 1 |
| Ford | Kimmel Racing | 68 | Baden Stewart | 1 |
| Ford | Kimmel Racing | 68 | Scott Melton | 1 |
| Ford | Kimmel Racing | 68 | Kevin Hinckle | 1 |
| Ford | Kimmel Racing | 69 | Will Kimmel | 9 |
| Ford | Kimmel Racing | 69 | Kevin Hinckle | 1 |
| Ford | Kimmel Racing | 69 | David Sear | 3 |
| Ford | Kimmel Racing | 69 | Mike Basham | 1 |
| Ford | Kimmel Racing | 69 | Darrell Basham | 1 |
| Ford | Kimmel Racing | 69 | Jonas Fors | 1 |
| Ford | Max Force Racing | 99 | Ronnie Osmer | 1 |
| Ford | MBM Motorsports | 66 | Mark Thompson | 1 |
| Ford | Mullins Racing (Note: All entries were fielded using owner points from Hixson Motorsports.) | 2 | Andrew Belmont | 1 |
| Ford | Mullins Racing | 2 | Robert Bruce | 1 |
| Ford | Mullins Racing | 3 | Willie Mullins | 2 |
| Ford | Mystic Motorsports | 07 | Brian Kaltreider | 2 |
| Ford | Rette Jones Racing | 30 | Grant Quinlan | 1 |
| Ford | Scott Melton Racing | 67 | Scott Melton | 1 |
| Toyota | DGM Racing | 71 | L. B. Skaggs | 3 |
| Toyota | DGR-Crosley | 54 | Noah Gragson | 2 |
| Toyota | DGR-Crosley | 54 | Bo LeMastus | 1 |
| Toyota | DGR-Crosley | 54 | Todd Gilliland | 4 |
| Toyota | Fast Track Racing (Note: It was a Fast Track Racing entry using Chad Bryant Racing's owner points.) | 22 | Ed Pompa | 1 |
| Toyota | Hendren Motorsports | 24 | Ryan Unzicker | 2 |
| Toyota | J. J. Pack Racing | 61 | J. J. Pack | 2 |
| Toyota | Jack Dossey Motorsports | 99 | Jack Dossey III | 2 |
| Toyota | Joe Gibbs Racing | 19 | Drew Herring | 1 |
| Toyota | MDM Motorsports | 12 | Harrison Burton | 8 |
| Toyota | MDM Motorsports | 12 | Brandon Jones | 2 |
| Toyota | MDM Motorsports | 12 | Austin Hill | 1 |
| Toyota | MDM Motorsports | 40 | Anthony Alfredo | 2 |
| Toyota | MDM Motorsports | 40 | Sam Mayer | 2 |
| Toyota | Venturini Motorsports | 55 | Tom Hessert III | 1 |
| Toyota | Venturini Motorsports | 55 | Michael Self | 4 |
| Toyota | Venturini Motorsports | 55 | Brandon Lynn | 2 |
| Toyota | Venturini Motorsports | 55 | Eddie Fatscher | 2 |
| Toyota | Venturini Motorsports | 55 | Toni Breidinger | 2 |
| Chevrolet 1 Ford 3 | Empire Racing | 43 | Sean Corr | 2 |
| Chevrolet 1 Ford 3 | Empire Racing | 43 | Kaden Honeycutt | 2 |
| Ford 5 Chevrolet 2 | Empire Racing | 46 | John Ferrier | 1 |
| Ford 5 Chevrolet 2 | Empire Racing | 46 | Thad Moffitt | 5 |
| Ford 5 Chevrolet 2 | Empire Racing | 46 | Sean Corr | 1 |
| Ford 3 Chevrolet 2 | Hixson Motorsports | 3 | Joe Cooksey | 3 |
| Ford 3 Chevrolet 2 | Hixson Motorsports | 3 | Steve Fox | 2 |
| Ford 12 Toyota 2 | Ken Schrader Racing | 52 | Will Rodgers | 5 |
| Ford 12 Toyota 2 | Ken Schrader Racing | 52 | Brandon Grosso (R) | 5 |
| Ford 12 Toyota 2 | Ken Schrader Racing | 52 | Ken Schrader | 1 |
| Ford 12 Toyota 2 | Ken Schrader Racing | 52 | Bret Holmes | 3 |
| Chevrolet 2 Ford 3 | Max Force Racing | 9 | Thomas Praytor | 4 |
| Chevrolet 2 Ford 3 | Max Force Racing | 9 | Jesse Iwuji | 1 |
| Chevrolet 7 Dodge 4 | Wayne Peterson Racing | 0 | Con Nicolopoulos | 3 |
| Chevrolet 7 Dodge 4 | Wayne Peterson Racing | 0 | Wayne Peterson | 3 |
| Chevrolet 7 Dodge 4 | Wayne Peterson Racing | 0 | Mark Meunier | 4 |
| Chevrolet 7 Dodge 4 | Wayne Peterson Racing | 0 | Don Thompson | 1 |
| Ford 2 Chevrolet 1 | Wayne Peterson Racing | 1 | Dale Matchett | 1 |
| Ford 2 Chevrolet 1 | Wayne Peterson Racing | 1 | Wayne Peterson | 2 |

== Changes ==
=== Teams ===
- Cunningham Motorsports, due to the failing health of owner Briggs Cunningham, was put up for sale after the conclusion of the 2017 season. On January 9, 2018, the sale of the team was announced to longtime crew chief Chad Bryant. Bryant formed Chad Bryant Racing but kept the same cars, numbers and personnel that had been with the team previously.
- Mullins Racing cut ties with Basham Racing, whose owner points they had used in past years. Mullins formed a new alliance with Hixson Motorsports, and Mullins used Hixson's No. 3 in some events.
- Patriot Motorsports Group formed an alliance with Basham Racing to use Basham's No. 34 in select races.
- DGR-Crosley debuted with Noah Gragson at Daytona.
- Kimmel Racing entered an alliance with Finney Racing for Finney to use Kimmel's No. 69.
- Mason Mitchell Motorsports ceased operations on July 30.
- Following the deaths of James Hylton and his son James Jr., the team's driver, Brad Smith, took over operations of the 48 team, which was rebranded as Brad Smith Motorsports.

=== Drivers ===
- Zane Smith drove full-time for MDM Motorsports in 2018. Smith had competed for MDM and Venturini Motorsports in 2017.
- Natalie Decker drove full-time for Venturini Motorsports in their No. 25 entry. She ran part-time in the No. 25 during the 2017 season.
- Travis Braden ran full-time in RFMS Racing's No. 27 entry. He ran part-time in the No. 27 last year.
- Sheldon Creed ran full-time in MDM Motorsports' No. 28 entry. He drove part-time for MDM in multiple cars last year.
- Chase Purdy full-time in MDM Motorsports' No. 8 entry. He ran part-time for Mason Mitchell Motorsports in 2017.
- Michael Self raced with Venturini Motorsports for half of the season. He drove part-time for MDM Motorsports and Mason Mitchell Motorsports in 2017.
- Brandon Grosso took over Ken Schrader Racing's No. 52 car. The entry was previously driven in 2017 by champion Austin Theriault. Grosso began his schedule at Nashville after Will Rodgers piloted the car at Daytona; Grosso was not old enough to compete. Grosso eventually left the team, and the No. 52 team shut down as well.
- Joe Graf Jr. made his first foray into ARCA, teaming with Chad Bryant Racing for all races except Daytona.
- Four drivers made their debuts at Salem in the spring: Colby Howard with Mason Mitchell Motorsports, Josh Berry with Chad Bryant Racing, Jack Dossey III with his family team, and Matt Dooley with Fast Track Racing.

== Schedule ==
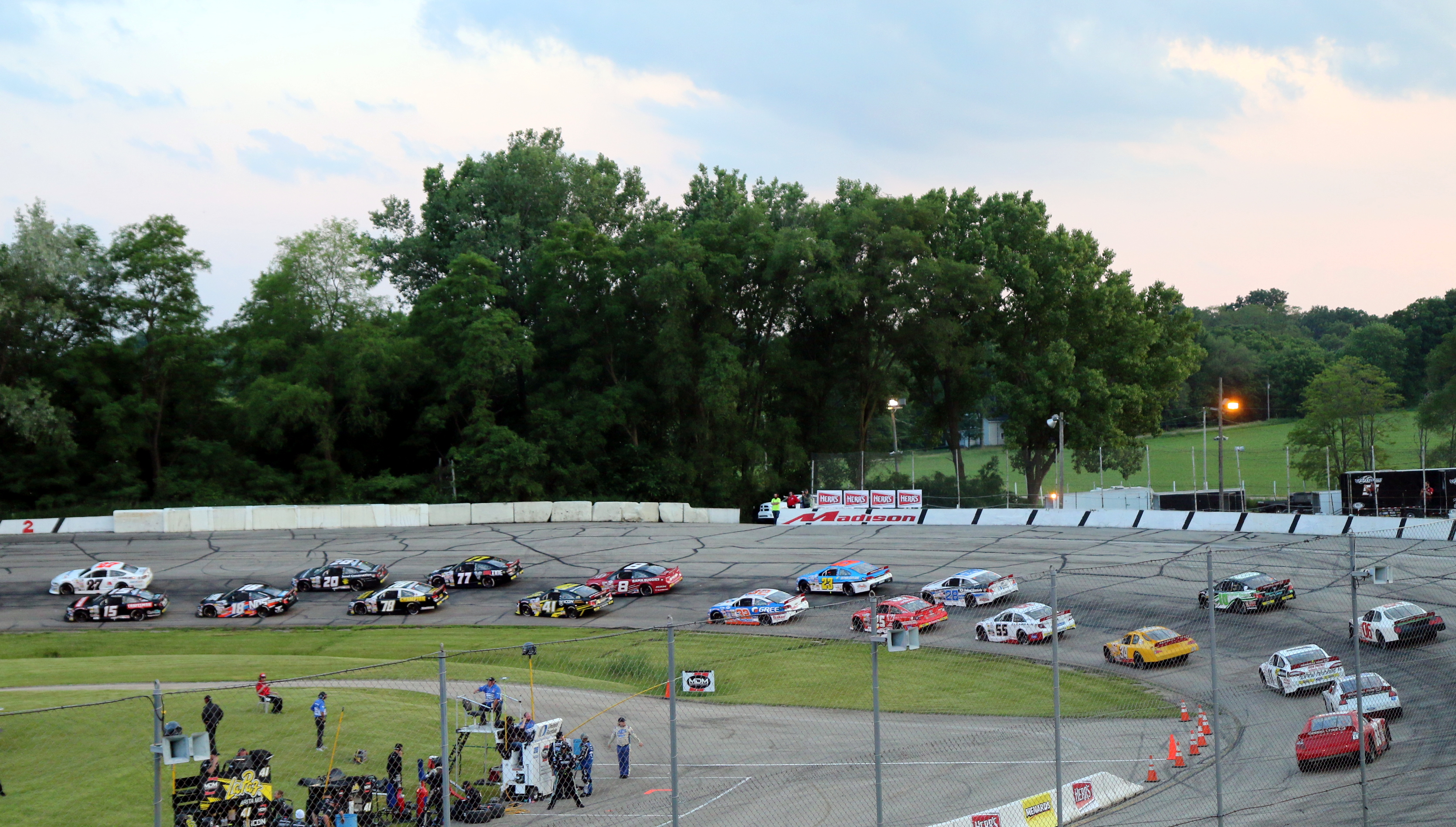
Field at Madison International Speedway

| No. | Race title | Track | Date | Time (EDT) | TV |
|---|---|---|---|---|---|
| 1 | Lucas Oil 200 driven by General Tire | Daytona International Speedway, Daytona Beach | February 10 | 4:45 p.m. | FS1 |
| 2 | Music City 200 | Fairgrounds Speedway, Nashville | April 7 | 9:00 p.m. | MAVTV |
| 3 | Kentuckiana Ford Dealers 200 | Salem Speedway, Salem | April 22 | 2:15 p.m. | MAVTV |
| 4 | General Tire 200 | Talladega Superspeedway, Lincoln | April 27 | 6:00 p.m. | FS1 |
| 5 | Menards 200 | Toledo Speedway, Toledo | May 20 | 2:00 p.m. | MAVTV |
| 6 | General Tire 150 | Charlotte Motor Speedway, Concord | May 24 | 9:00 p.m. | FS1 |
| 7 | General Tire#AnywhereIsPossible 200 | Pocono Raceway, Long Pond | June 1 | 5:45 p.m. | FS2 |
| 8 | Zomongo 200 | Michigan International Speedway, Brooklyn | June 8 | 6:00 p.m. | MAVTV |
| 9 | Herr's Potato Chips 200 | Madison International Speedway, Oregon | June 15 | 9:00 p.m. | MAVTV |
| 10 | PapaNicholas Coffee 150 | Gateway Motorsports Park, Madison | June 22 | 9:00 p.m. | FS2 |
| 11 | Scott 150 | Chicagoland Speedway, Joliet | June 28 | 8:00 p.m. | FS1 |
| 12 | Fans with Benefits 150 | Iowa Speedway, Newton | July 7 | 9:00 p.m. | MAVTV* |
| 13 | Sioux Chief PowerPEX 250 | Elko Speedway, Elko | July 14 | 9:00 p.m. | MAVTV |
| 14 | ModSpace 150 | Pocono Raceway, Long Pond | July 27 | 4:00 p.m. | FS1 |
| 15 | Allen Crowe 100 | Illinois State Fairgrounds Racetrack, Springfield | August 19 | 2:30 p.m. | MAVTV |
| 16 | Primera Plastics 200 | Berlin Raceway, Marne | August 25 | 8:30 p.m. | MAVTV |
| 17 | General Tire Grabber 150 | DuQuoin State Fairgrounds Racetrack, Du Quoin | September 3 | 4:00 p.m. | MAVTV |
| 18 | Kentuckiana Ford Dealers ARCA Fall Classic | Salem Speedway, Salem | September 15 | 7:15 p.m. | MAVTV |
| 19 | Shore Lunch 200 | Lucas Oil Raceway, Brownsburg | October 6 | 9:00 p.m. | MAVTV |
| 20 | Kansas ARCA 150 | Kansas Speedway, Kansas City | October 19 | 8:30 p.m. | FS2 |
†: The Primera Plastics 200 was originally scheduled on July 21 but was postponed because of persistent rain and rescheduled for August 25. †: The Shore Lunch 200 was originally scheduled on September 7 but was postponed because of Tropical Storm Gordon and rescheduled for October 6.

- *Tape delayed

=== Changes ===
Charlotte Motor Speedway, Gateway Motorsports Park, and Berlin Raceway all return to the schedule. The series had last visited Gateway in 2007 and Charlotte in 2004. The only road course on the 2017 schedule, Road America, was taken out for 2018. The races at Winchester Speedway and Kentucky Speedway were also taken off the schedule. The races at Elko Speedway and Lucas Oil Raceway shifted significantly. Elko moved to the middle of July because the first Pocono date was moved to the weekend that Elko had in 2017, and Lucas Oil moved to September because the NASCAR Indianapolis weekend was moved to September.

== Results and standings ==
=== Races ===
| No. | Race | Pole Position | Most laps led | Winning driver | Manufacturer | No. | Winning team |
|---|---|---|---|---|---|---|---|
| 1 | Lucas Oil 200 driven by General Tire | Natalie Decker | Sheldon Creed | Michael Self | Toyota | 15 | Venturini Motorsports |
| 2 | Music City 200 | Chandler Smith | Zane Smith | Zane Smith | Toyota | 41 | MDM Motorsports |
| 3 | Kentuckiana Ford Dealers 200 | Chandler Smith | Chandler Smith | Christian Eckes | Toyota | 15 | Venturini Motorsports |
| 4 | General Tire 200 | Michael Self | Sheldon Creed | Zane Smith | Toyota | 41 | MDM Motorsports |
| 5 | Menards 200 | Chandler Smith | Chandler Smith | Zane Smith | Toyota | 41 | MDM Motorsports |
| 6 | General Tire 150 | Todd Gilliland | Todd Gilliland | Brandon Jones | Toyota | 12 | MDM Motorsports |
| 7 | General Tire#AnywhereIsPossible 200 | Noah Gragson | Noah Gragson | Harrison Burton | Toyota | 12 | MDM Motorsports |
| 8 | Zomongo 200 | Brandon Jones | Sheldon Creed | Sheldon Creed | Toyota | 28 | MDM Motorsports |
| 9 | Herr's Potato Chips 200 | Chandler Smith | Chandler Smith | Chandler Smith | Toyota | 15 | Venturini Motorsports |
| 10 | PapaNicholas Coffee 150 | Sheldon Creed | Sheldon Creed | Sheldon Creed | Toyota | 28 | MDM Motorsports |
| 11 | Scott 150 | Sheldon Creed | Michael Self | Michael Self | Toyota | 15 | Venturini Motorsports |
| 12 | Fans with Benefits 150 | Sheldon Creed | Sheldon Creed | Sheldon Creed | Toyota | 28 | MDM Motorsports |
| 13 | Sioux Chief PowerPEX 250 | Christian Eckes | Chandler Smith | Gus Dean | Chevrolet | 32 | Win-Tron Racing |
| 14 | ModSpace 150 | Gus Dean | Zane Smith | Zane Smith | Toyota | 41 | MDM Motorsports |
| 15 | Allen Crowe 100 | Gus Dean | Christian Eckes | Christian Eckes | Toyota | 15 | Venturini Motorsports |
| 16 | Primera Plastics 200 | Carson Hocevar | Sheldon Creed | Joe Graf Jr. | Ford | 77 | Chad Bryant Racing |
| 17 | General Tire Grabber 100 | Sheldon Creed | Sheldon Creed | Logan Seavey | Toyota | 20 | Venturini Motorsports |
| 18 | Kentuckiana Ford Dealers ARCA Fall Classic | Zane Smith | Chandler Smith | Chandler Smith | Toyota | 20 | Venturini Motorsports |
| 19 | Shore Lunch 200 | Christian Eckes | Christian Eckes | Christian Eckes | Toyota | 15 | Venturini Motorsports |
| 20 | Kansas ARCA 150 | Drew Herring | Drew Herring | Sheldon Creed | Toyota | 28 | MDM Motorsports |

=== Drivers' championship ===
(key) Bold – Pole position awarded by time. Italics – Pole position set by final practice results or rainout. * – Most laps led.

| Pos | Driver | DAY | NSH | SLM | TAL | TOL | CLT | POC | MCH | MAD | GTW | CHI | IOW | ELK | POC | ISF | BLN | DSF | SLM | IRP | KAN | Points |
|---|---|---|---|---|---|---|---|---|---|---|---|---|---|---|---|---|---|---|---|---|---|---|
| 1 | Sheldon Creed | 3 | 2 | 3 | 4 | 18 | 3 | 2 | 1 | 3 | **1** | **2** | **1** | 15 | 2 | 2 | 6 | **10** | 4 | 2 | 1 | 5140 |
| 2 | Zane Smith | 26 | 1 | 2 | 1 | 1 | 5 | 3 | 11 | 2 | 16 | 4 | 4 | 12 | 1 | 17 | 2 | 5 | **18** | 6 | 17 | 4680 |
| 3 | Riley Herbst | 10 | 13 | 6 | 17 | 19 | 2 | 5 | 2 | 13 | 5 | 6 | 17 | 4 | 5 | 9 | 9 | 3 | 9 | 8 | 4 | 4595 |
| 4 | Chase Purdy | 21 | 7 | 5 | 25 | 2 | 24 | 9 | 13 | 4 | 2 | 5 | 3 | 14 | 3 | 18 | 8 | 8 | 3 | 4 | 5 | 4510 |
| 5 | Travis Braden | 22 | 15 | 14 | 9 | 8 | 11 | 4 | 12 | 11 | 9 | 7 | 9 | 7 | 9 | 4 | 3 | 15 | 5 | 12 | 20 | 4445 |
| 6 | Gus Dean | 25 | 17 | 7 | 12 | 20 | 14 | 6 | 4 | 5 | 6 | 16 | 20 | 1 | **27** | **7** | 5 | 18 | 2 | 10 | 18 | 4295 |
| 7 | Natalie Decker | **5** | 11 | 17 | 28 | 7 | 15 | 8 | 15 | 6 | 15 | 12 | 16 | 5 | 15 | 10 | 10 | 12 | 8 | 16 | 6 | 4220 |
| 8 | Joe Graf Jr. | | 16 | 11 | 2 | 3 | 18 | 7 | 5 | 12 | 8 | 13 | 5 | 3 | 26 | 16 | 1 | 11 | 11 | 13 | 21 | 4000 |
| 9 | Brad Smith | 23 | 22 | Wth | 31 | 16 | DNS | 20 | 17 | 14 | 17 | 22 | 15 | 17 | 22 | 14 | 16 | 17 | 20 | 22 | 25 | 3250 |
| 10 | Bret Holmes | 24 | 10 | 13 | 27 | 5 | 7 | 13 | 20 | 7 | 10 | Wth | 8 | Wth | 10 | 6 | 12 | | | | | 2865 |
| 11 | Con Nicolopoulos | 18 | 23 | 21 | 14 | 22 | 29 | 30 | 21 | 17 | 24 | 23 | 22 | Wth | 23 | Wth | 18 | | 22 | 23 | 16 | 2690 |
| 12 | Christian Eckes | | 8 | 1 | | 21 | | 11 | | | 4 | | 11 | **2** | 13 | 1 | 11 | 4 | 7 | **1** | | 2650 |
| 13 | Mike Basham | | 26 | 15 | | 15 | | 28 | Wth | 16 | 23 | 24 | | 11 | 18 | 19 | 14 | 19 | 12 | 24 | 24 | 2120 |
| 14 | Chandler Smith | | **5** | **10** | | **4** | | | | **1** | | | 2 | 6 | | | 7 | | 1 | 3 | | 1995 |
| 15 | Michael Self | 1 | 4 | | **3** | | 21 | | 3 | | | 1 | 18 | | | | | | 16 | 11 | 3 | 1985 |
| 16 | Harrison Burton | | 3 | | | 9 | | 1 | | | 3 | | 6 | | 4 | | | | 6 | 21 | 2 | 1840 |
| 17 | Max Tullman | 6 | | | 6 | | 12 | 15 | 7 | | 19 | 17 | 12 | | | | | | | | | 1380 |
| 18 | Will Kimmel | | 24 | 12 | | 23 | | | | | 13 | 15 | | | | Wth | | 2 | 10 | | 13 | 1310 |
| 19 | Codie Rohrbaugh | 38 | | | 24 | | 9 | 17 | 10 | | | 8 | | | 7 | | | | | | 12 | 1285 |
| 20 | Leilani Münter | 8 | | | 22 | | 20 | 22 | 9 | | | 20 | | | 20 | | | | | | 14 | 1225 |
| 21 | Brandon Grosso | Wth | 9 | 9 | 20 | 6 | 17 | | | | | | | | | | | | | | | 1120 |
| 22 | Will Rodgers | 30 | | | | | 8 | 18 | 6 | | | 9 | | | 8 | | | | | | | 985 |
| 23 | Bobby Gerhart | 12 | | | 8 | | | 16 | | | 14 | | | | 24 | | DNS | | | 17 | | 975 |
| 24 | Dick Doheny | | | 22 | | | | | | | 21 | | 21 | 16 | | 20 | 17 | 21 | | | | 945 |
| 25 | Todd Gilliland | | | | | | **4** | | | | | 3 | | | 6 | | | | | | 22 | 830 |
| 26 | Thad Moffitt | | 14 | 16 | | 10 | | 25 | | | | | | | Wth | | | | | 15 | | 780 |
| 27 | Eric Caudell | | 20 | | | | | | | | 18 | 21 | | | | | | | 23 | Wth | 11 | 710 |
| 28 | Blaine Perkins | | | | 13 | | | 12 | | | | 11 | | 8 | | | | | | | | 705 |
| 29 | Tyler Hill | | | | | | | | | | | | | | | | 13 | | 14 | 14 | 7 | 680 |
| 30 | Bryan Dauzat | 33 | | | 11 | | 27 | | | | | | | | 16 | 12 | | Wth | | | | 650 |
| 31 | Carson Hocevar | | | | | 11 | | | | | | | | | | | **4** | | | 5 | | 645 |
| 32 | Rick Clifton | | 19 | | | 17 | | | 16 | | | | 13 | | | | | | | | | 645 |
| 33 | Jesse Iwuji | 36 | | | 15 | | 26 | 24 | 24 | | | 25 | | | | | | | | | | 630 |
| 34 | Quin Houff | 32 | | | | | 6 | | 8 | | | | | | 21 | | | | | | | 585 |
| 35 | Darrell Basham | | | | | | | | | 19 | | | 14 | 18 | | | | 20 | | Wth | | 565 |
| 36 | Ed Pompa | 35 | | | 29 | | | 23 | | | | | | | 14 | | | | 17 | | | 560 |
| 37 | Thomas Praytor | 14 | 18 | 19 | 21 | | | | | | | | | | | | | | | | | 560 |
| 38 | Eddie Fatscher | | | | | 14 | | | | 8 | | | | 9 | | | | | | | | 535 |
| 39 | L. B. Skaggs | | | | | | | 14 | | | | | | | 11 | | | | | | 23 | 510 |
| 40 | Tommy Vigh Jr. | | | | | | | | | 15 | | | | | | 13 | | 13 | | | | 495 |
| 41 | Joe Cooksey | | 21 | | | | | | | | | | | | | 11 | | 9 | | | | 490 |
| 42 | Toni Breidinger | | | | | | | | | 10 | 12 | 18 | | | | | | | | | | 490 |
| 43 | Wayne Peterson | | Wth | | | | | | DNS | | 25 | 27 | 23 | | | | 19 | | DNS | | | 465 |
| 44 | Andy Seuss | 19 | | | 10 | | 16 | | | | | | | | | | | | | | | 465 |
| 45 | Zach Ralston | | | | | | 23 | | | | | 14 | | | | | | | | | 9 | 460 |
| 46 | Logan Seavey | | | | | | | | | | | | | | | 3 | | 1 | | | | 455 |
| 47 | Alex Clubb | | | | | | | | | | | | | | | 15 | | 16 | 21 | | | 430 |
| 48 | Sean Corr | 20 | | | 23 | | | | | | | | | | 12 | | | | | | | 420 |
| 49 | David Sear | | | | | | 22 | | 14 | | | | 19 | | | | | | | | | 415 |
| 50 | Anthony Alfredo | | | | | | | | | | 7 | | | | | | | | | | 15 | 410 |
| 51 | Ryan Unzicker | | | | | | | | | | | | | | | 5 | | 6 | | | | 410 |
| 52 | Sam Mayer | | | | | | | | | | | | 10 | | | | | | | 7 | | 400 |
| 53 | Tom Hessert III | 4 | | | | | | | | | | | | | | | | | | 9 | | 395 |
| 54 | Kelly Kovski | | | | | | | | | | | | | | | 8 | | 7 | | | | 385 |
| 55 | Willie Mullins | 2 | | | | | | | | | | | | 13 | | | | | | | | 385 |
| 56 | Noah Gragson | 7 | | | | | | **10** | | | | | | | | | | | | | | 385 |
| 57 | Dave Mader III | 28 | | | 16 | | | | 18 | | | | | | | | | | | | | 380 |
| 58 | Tom Berte | | | | | | 19 | | | | | 19 | | | 25 | | | | | | | 375 |
| 59 | Tony Mrakovich | 29 | | | | 13 | | 21 | | | | | | | | | | | | | | 375 |
| 60 | Colby Howard | | | 8 | | | | | | 9 | | | | | | | | | | | | 375 |
| 61 | Brandon Jones | | | | | | 1 | | **22** | | | | | | | | | | | | | 370 |
| 62 | Brandon Lynn | | | | 7 | | 10 | | | | | | | | | | | | | | | 350 |
| 63 | Austin Hill | | | | | | 13 | | | | | 10 | | | | | | | | | | 345 |
| 64 | Mark Meunier | | | 24 | | | | | 25 | | 22 | 26 | | | | | | | | | | 310 |
| 65 | Tyler Dippel | | 6 | | | | 25 | | | | | | | | | | | | | | | 310 |
| 66 | Kaden Honeycutt | | | | | | | | | | | | | | | | | | 19 | 18 | | 300 |
| 67 | Jack Dossey III | | | 18 | | | | | | | | | | | | | | | 15 | | | 295 |
| 68 | Kevin Hinckle | | | | 30 | | | | | | | | | | | | | | | | 19 | 275 |
| 69 | Don Thompson | | | | | | 28 | 27 | | | | | | | 29 | | | | | | | 270 |
| 70 | Steve Fox | | | | | | | 19 | | | | | | | 19 | | | | | | | 270 |
| 71 | D. L. Wilson | | 25 | | 19 | | | | | | | | | | | | | | | Wth | | 265 |
| 72 | Brian Kaltreider | | | | | | | 26 | | | | | | | 17 | | | | | | | 245 |
| 73 | Matt Dooley | | | 23 | | | | | | | 20 | | | | | | | | | | | 245 |
| 74 | Josh Berry | | | 4 | | | | | | | | | | | | | | | | | | 215 |
| 75 | Drew Herring | | | | | | | | | | | | | | | | | | | | **8** | 205 |
| 76 | Josh Williams | | | | 5 | | | | | | | | | | | | | | | | | 205 |
| 77 | Mason Mitchell | | | | | | | | | | | | 7 | | | | | | | | | 195 |
| 78 | Buck Stevens | | | | | | | | | | | | | | | Wth | | 14 | | | | 185 |
| 79 | Andrew Belmont | 9 | | | | | | | | | | | | | | | | | | | | 185 |
| 80 | Cole Glasson | | | | | | | | | | | | | | | | | | | | 10 | 180 |
| 81 | Scott Melton | | | | | | | | | | | | | | | | 15 | | | 25 | | 180 |
| 82 | Dale Matchett | | | | | | | 29 | | | | | | | 28 | | | | | | | 175 |
| 83 | Ken Schrader | | | | | | | | | | 11 | | | | | | | | | | | 175 |
| 84 | Bo LeMastus | 31 | | | 26 | | | | | | | | | | | | | | | | | 175 |
| 85 | Jerry de Weerdt | 11 | | | | | | | | | | | | | | | | | | | | 175 |
| 86 | Ryan Repko | | 12 | | | | | | | | | | | | | | | | | | | 170 |
| 87 | Grant Enfinger | | | | | 12 | | | | | | | | | | | | | | | | 170 |
| 88 | Baden Stewart | | | | | | | | | | | | | | | | | | 13 | | | 165 |
| 89 | Kirk Horton | 13 | | | | | | | | | | | | | | | | | | | | 165 |
| 90 | C. J. McLaughlin | | | | | | | | | | | | | | | | | | | 20 | | 155 |
| 91 | Robert Bruce | | | | | | | | | | | | | 10 | | | | | | | | 155 |
| 92 | Chuck Hiers | 16 | | | | | | | | | | | | | | | | | | | | 155 |
| 93 | John Ferrier | 15 | | | | | | | | | | | | | | | | | | | | 155 |
| 94 | Scott Reeves | 17 | | | | | | | | | | | | | | | | | | | | 145 |
| 95 | Dick Karth | | | | | | | | | 18 | | | | | | | | | | | | 140 |
| 96 | Rob Powers | | | | 18 | | | | | | | | | | | | | | | | | 140 |
| 97 | Morgen Baird | | | | | | | | 19 | | | | | | | | | | | | | 140 |
| 98 | Jonas Fors | | | | | | | | | | | | | | | | | | | 19 | | 135 |
| 99 | Dale Shearer | | | 20 | | | | | | | | | | | | Wth | | | | | | 130 |
| 100 | Chad Finley | | | | | | | | 23 | | | | | | | | | | | | | 115 |
| 101 | Mark Thompson | 27 | | | | | | | | | | | | | | | | | | | | 95 |
| 102 | Daniel Sasnett | 34 | | | | | | | | | | | | | | | | | | | | 60 |
| 103 | Grant Quinlan | 37 | | | | | | | | | | | | | | | | | | | | 45 |
| 104 | Ronnie Osmer | 39 | | | | | | | | | | | | | | | | | | | | 35 |
| 105 | Tovia Grynewicz | | Wth | | | | | | | | | | | | | | | | | | | 25 |
| | Salvatore Iovino | | | | | | Wth | | | | | | | | | | | | | | | 0 |
| | J. J. Pack | | | | | | | | | | | | | | Wth | | | | | | Wth | 0 |
| | Kevin Campbell | | | | | | | | | | | | | | | | | Wth | | | | 0 |
| | Brennan Poole | | | | | | | QL | | | | | | | | | | | | | | 0 |

== See also ==
- 2018 Monster Energy NASCAR Cup Series
- 2018 NASCAR Xfinity Series
- 2018 NASCAR Camping World Truck Series
- 2018 NASCAR K&N Pro Series East
- 2018 NASCAR K&N Pro Series West
- 2018 NASCAR Whelen Modified Tour
- 2018 NASCAR Pinty's Series
- 2018 NASCAR PEAK Mexico Series
- 2018 NASCAR Whelen Euro Series
- 2018 CARS Tour
