= Brandon Grosso =

American racecar driver (born 2000)

- Nationality: (United States) American
- Born: March 30, 2000 (age 26) Montgomery Township, New Jersey, U.S.

ARCA Menards Series career
- Debut season: 2017
- Former teams: Ken Schrader Racing
- Starts: 17
- Wins: 0
- Poles: 0
- Best finish: 21st in 2018
- Finished last season: 21st (2018)

Previous series
- 2017: CARS Late Model Stock Tour
- Statistics up to date as of January 24, 2020.

Brandon Grosso (born March 30, 2000) is an American professional stock car racing driver. He most recently competed part-time in the ARCA Menards Series in both 2017 and 2018, driving the No. 11 and No. 52 cars for Ken Schrader Racing. Since then, he has been without a ride in that series, but he does currently compete in crate modified racing.

Raised in Montgomery Township, New Jersey, Grosso attended Montgomery High School.

== Racing career ==
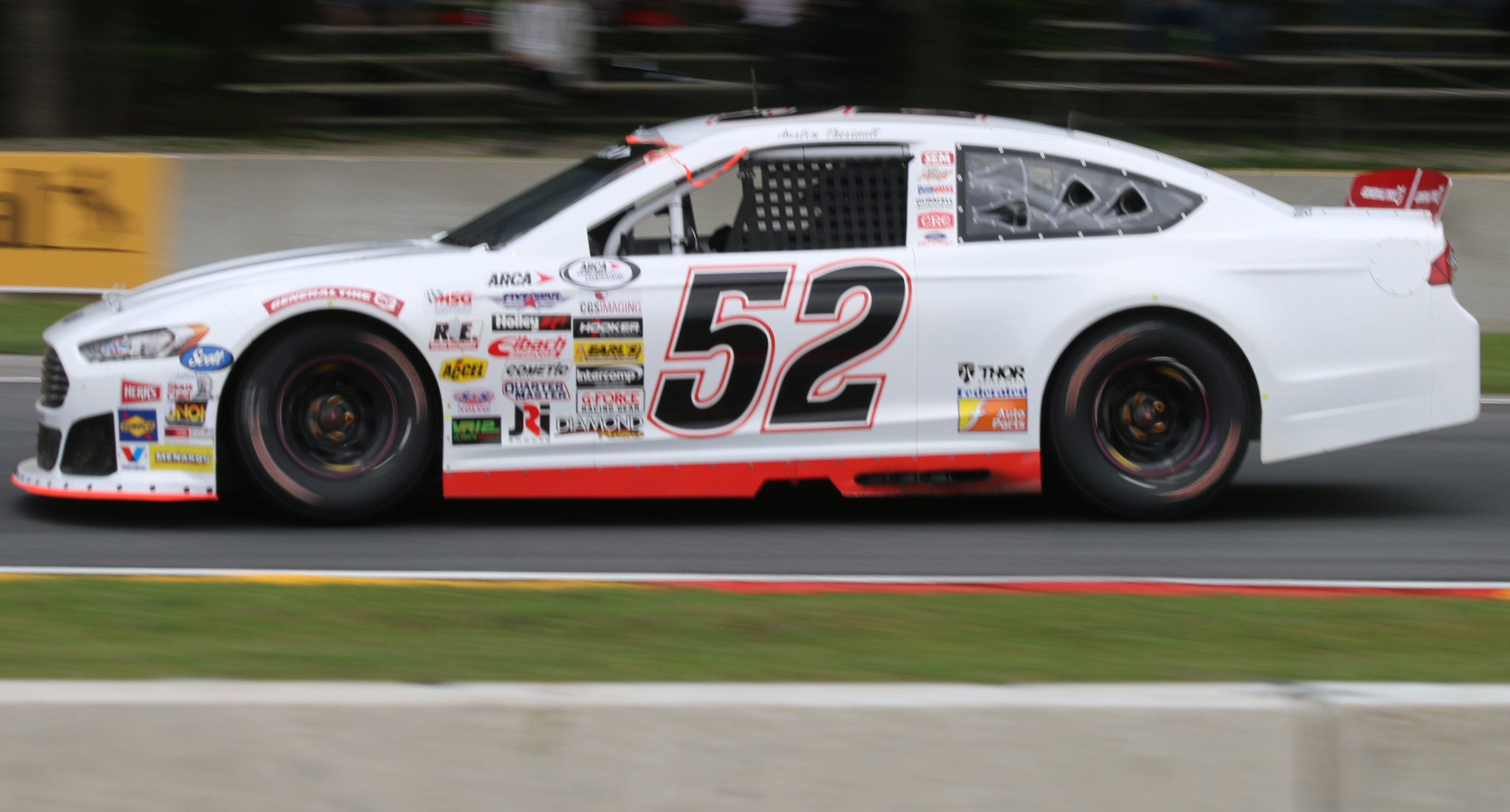
The No. 52 car for Ken Schrader Racing, which Grosso drove in 2018.

Grosso started racing at the age of four when his father gave him a quarter midget for his birthday, and eventually began to compete frequently in dirt modified races at New Egypt Speedway in his home state of New Jersey. Grosso's parents, Rick and Nanci, were the owners of the racetrack from 1997 to 2006, buying the track when it was dilapidated, and renovating it before selling it to other owners.

Grosso drove a full season in the CARS Late Model Stock Tour in 2017, driving a car owned by NASCAR on NBC pit reporter Marty Snider.

Grosso made his first start in the ARCA Series later that year at the dirt track of DuQuoin, earning a fifth place finish driving the No. 11 car for Ken Schrader Racing in a partnership with Andy Hillenburg's Fast Track Racing team.

Schrader later signed Grosso on for a full season the following year in his primary No. 52 car, replacing 2017 champion Austin Theriault, who was released from the team due to sponsorship issues. With big shoes to fill, Grosso made his first start at the second race of the season at Nashville due to not being old enough to run the season-opener at Daytona which was before his 18th birthday on March 30. However, under ARCA rules, Grosso was allowed to participate in the series' testing at the track in January as well as run one lap in practice for the race there in February before being required to withdraw, the same situation Riley Herbst was faced with in 2017. Theriault was supposed to replace him for Daytona, but later in the offseason, the team signed Will Rodgers to drive for them, and he brought sponsorship.

Grosso was eventually released from Schrader's team, and he was replaced by his teammate Rodgers, who after subbing for Grosso at Daytona had been running a part-time schedule in the No. 11 KSR-Hillenburg car, but was moved over to Schrader's No. 52 to run the remainder of his schedule.

Although Grosso did not make any ARCA or stock car starts for another team for the rest of 2018 or in 2019, he was still racing. He ran in Saturday night crate modified events in his own No. 32 car at New Egypt and other tracks in the area.

== Personal life ==
Grosso is from the Belle Mead section of Montgomery Township, New Jersey, and is a 2018 graduate of Montgomery High School. His dad was friends with his high school principal, who allowed Grosso to have extra absences during the school year so he could go racing.

== Motorsports career results ==
=== ARCA Racing Series ===
(key) (Bold – Pole position awarded by qualifying time. Italics – Pole position earned by points standings or practice time. * – Most laps led.)

ARCA Racing Series results
Year	Team	No.	Make	1	2	3	4	5	6	7	8	9	10	11	12	13	14	15	16	17	18	19	20	ARSC	Pts	Ref
2017	Schrader-Hillenburg Racing	11	Toyota	DAY	NSH	SLM	TAL	TOL	ELK	POC	MCH	MAD	IOW	IRP	POC	WIN	ISF	ROA	DSF; 5	SLM	CHI	KEN	KAN	78th	205	
2018	Schrader-Hillenburg Racing	11	Toyota	DAY; Wth																				21st	1120	
2018	Ken Schrader Racing	52	Ford		NSH; 9	SLM; 9	TAL; 20	TOL; 6	CLT; 17	POC	MCH	MAD	GTW	CHI	IOW	ELK	POC	ISF	BLN	DSF	SLM	IRP	KAN	21st	1120	

=== CARS Late Model Stock Car Tour ===
(key) (Bold – Pole position awarded by qualifying time. Italics – Pole position earned by points standings or practice time. * – Most laps led. ** – All laps led.)

CARS Late Model Stock Car Tour results
Year	Team	No.	Make	1	2	3	4	5	6	7	8	9	10	11	12	13	CLMSCTC	Pts	Ref
2017	Marty Snider	32	Ford	CON; 13	DOM; 14	**DOM**; 3	HCY; 9	HCY; 8	BRI; 16	AND; 17	ROU; 14	TCM; 3*	ROU; 8	HCY; 4	CON; 2	SBO	5th	287	

^{*} Season still in progress
^{1} Ineligible for series points
