= L. B. Skaggs =

American racing driver

- Born: December 6, 1976 (age 49); Fort Myers, Florida, U.S.

ARCA Menards Series career
- 3 races run over 1 year
- Best finish: 39th (2018)
- First race: 2018 General Tire#AnywhereIsPossible 200 (Pocono)
- Last race: 2018 Kansas ARCA 150 (Kansas)
Wins	Top tens	Poles
0	0	0
- Statistics up to date as of January 19, 2025.

L. B. Skaggs (born December 6, 1976) is an American professional stock car racing driver who has competed in the ARCA Racing Series for three races in 2018, getting a best finish of eleventh at Pocono Raceway.

Skaggs also previously competed in series such as the CRA JEGS All-Stars Tour, the Midwest Modifieds Tour, the Modifieds of Mayhem Tour, the Sunshine State Challenge Series, and the World Series of Asphalt Stock Car Racing.

== Motorsports results ==
=== ARCA Racing Series ===
(key) (Bold – Pole position awarded by qualifying time. Italics – Pole position earned by points standings or practice time. * – Most laps led.)

ARCA Racing Series results
Year	Team	No.	Make	1	2	3	4	5	6	7	8	9	10	11	12	13	14	15	16	17	18	19	20	ARSC	Pts	Ref
2018	DGM Racing	71	Toyota	DAY	NSH	SLM	TAL	TOL	CLT	POC; 14	MCH	MAD	GTW	CHI	IOW	ELK	POC; 11	ISF	BLN	DSF	SLM	IRP	KAN; 23	39th	510	
