= Jack Dossey III =

American racing driver

- Born: January 19, 1999 (age 27); Indianapolis, Indiana, U.S.

ARCA Menards Series career
- 2 races run over 1 year
- Best finish: 67th (2018)
- First race: 2018 Kentuckiana Ford Dealers ARCA 200 (Salem)
- Last race: 2018 Kentuckiana Ford Dealers ARCA Fall Classic (Salem)
Wins	Top tens	Poles
0	0	0
- Statistics up to date as of February 4, 2025.

Jack Dossey III (born January 19, 1999) is an American professional stock car racing driver who has previously competed in the ARCA Racing Series.

Dossey has also competed in series such as the CRA JEGS All-Stars Tour, where he won the championship in 2017 and 2018, the ASA Southern Super Series, the ASA CRA Super Series, and the CARS Super Late Model Tour.

== Motorsports results ==
=== ARCA Racing Series ===
(key) (Bold – Pole position awarded by qualifying time. Italics – Pole position earned by points standings or practice time. * – Most laps led.)

ARCA Racing Series results
Year	Team	No.	Make	1	2	3	4	5	6	7	8	9	10	11	12	13	14	15	16	17	18	19	20	ARSC	Pts	Ref
2018	Jack Dossey Motorsports	99	Toyota	DAY	NSH	SLM; 18	TAL	TOL	CLT	POC	MCH	MAD	GTW	CHI	IOW	ELK	POC	ISF	BLN	DSF	SLM; 15	IRP	KAN	67th	295	

=== CARS Super Late Model Tour ===
(key)

CARS Super Late Model Tour results
Year	Team	No.	Make	1	2	3	4	5	6	7	8	9	CSLMTC	Pts	Ref
2018	N/A	20	N/A	MYB	NSH	ROU	HCY	BRI; 24	AND	HCY	ROU	SBO	N/A	0	
2019	N/A	20D	Toyota	SNM	HCY	NSH; 7	MMS	BRI; 16	HCY	ROU	SBO		N/A	0	
