= Zach Ralston =

American racing driver

- Born: October 3, 1986 (age 40); Springville, Iowa, U.S.

ARCA Menards Series career
- 13 races run over 5 years
- Best finish: 38th (2012)
- First race: 2012 Lucas Oil Slick Mist 200 (Daytona)
- Last race: 2018 Kansas ARCA 150 (Kansas)
Wins	Top tens	Poles
0	1	0
- Statistics up to date as of January 20, 2025.

Zach Ralston (born October 3, 1986) is an American former professional stock car racing driver who has previously competed in the ARCA Racing Series from 2011 to 2018.

== Motorsports results ==
=== ARCA Racing Series ===
(key) (Bold – Pole position awarded by qualifying time. Italics – Pole position earned by points standings or practice time. * – Most laps led.)

ARCA Racing Series results
Year	Team	No.	Make	1	2	3	4	5	6	7	8	9	10	11	12	13	14	15	16	17	18	19	20	21	ARSC	Pts	Ref
2011	Stringer Motorsports	90	Chevy	DAY	TAL	SLM	TOL	NJE	CHI	POC	MCH	WIN	BLN	IOW	IRP	POC	ISF	MAD	DSF	SLM	KAN	TOL; DNQ			N/A	0	
2012	ZR Racing	90	Ford	DAY; 18	MOB	SLM	TAL; 16	TOL	ELK	POC	MCH														38th	585	
2012	Roulo Brothers Racing	99	Ford									WIN; 30	NJE							MAD; 29	SLM	DSF	KAN		38th	585	
2012	Stringer Motorsports	90	Chevy											IOW; 20	CHI	IRP	POC	BLN	ISF						38th	585	
2013	Roulo Brothers Racing	17	Ford	DAY	MOB; 25	SLM	TAL	TOL	ELK	POC	MCH	ROA	WIN	CHI	NJM	POC	BLN	ISF	MAD	DSF	IOW	SLM	KEN		55th	485	
2013	Richard Ralston	07	Chevy																					KAN; 20	55th	485	
2017	Fast Track Racing	10	Ford	DAY	NSH	SLM	TAL	TOL	ELK	POC	MCH	MAD	IOW; 24	IRP; 25	POC	WIN	ISF	ROA	DSF	SLM	CHI; 22	KEN	KAN		61st	335	
2018	ZR Racing	1	Chevy	DAY	NSH	SLM	TAL	TOL	CLT; 23	POC	MCH	MAD	GTW												45th	460	
2018	ZR Racing	11	Chevy											CHI; 14	IOW	ELK	POC	ISF	BLN	DSF	SLM	IRP			45th	460	
2018	Fast Track Racing	11	Chevy																				KAN; 9		45th	460	
