= Ronnie Osmer =

American racing driver

- Born: December 13, 1999 (age 26); Pearl River, Louisiana, U.S.

ARCA Menards Series career
- 3 races run over 3 years
- Best finish: 104th (2018)
- First race: 2015 ARCA Mobile 200 (Mobile)
- Last race: 2018 Lucas Oil 200 (Daytona)
Wins	Top tens	Poles
0	0	0
- Statistics up to date as of January 30, 2025.

Ronnie Osmer (born December 13, 1999) is an American professional stock car racing driver who has previously competed in the ARCA Racing Series from 2015 to 2018.

Osmer has also competed in the Carolina Pro Late Model Series, the ARCA Truck Series, and the Show Me The Money Pro Late Model Series.

== Motorsports results ==
=== ARCA Racing Series ===
(key) (Bold – Pole position awarded by qualifying time. Italics – Pole position earned by points standings or practice time. * – Most laps led.)

ARCA Racing Series results
Year	Team	No.	Make	1	2	3	4	5	6	7	8	9	10	11	12	13	14	15	16	17	18	19	20	ARSC	Pts	Ref
2015	Carter 2 Motorsports	40	Dodge	DAY	MOB; 17	NSH	SLM	TAL	TOL	NJE	POC	MCH	CHI	WIN	IOW	IRP	POC	BLN	ISF	DSF	SLM	KEN	KAN	106th	145	
2016	Hamilton-Hughes Racing	64	Dodge	DAY	NSH	SLM; 32	TAL	TOL	NJE	POC	MCH	MAD	WIN	IOW	IRP	POC	BLN	ISF	DSF	SLM	CHI	KEN	KAN	135th	25	
2018	Max Force Racing	99	Ford	DAY; 39	NSH	SLM	TAL	TOL	CLT	POC	MCH	MAD	GTW	CHI	IOW	ELK	POC	ISF	BLN	DSF	SLM	IRP	KAN	104th	35	
