= Eddie Fatscher =

American racing driver

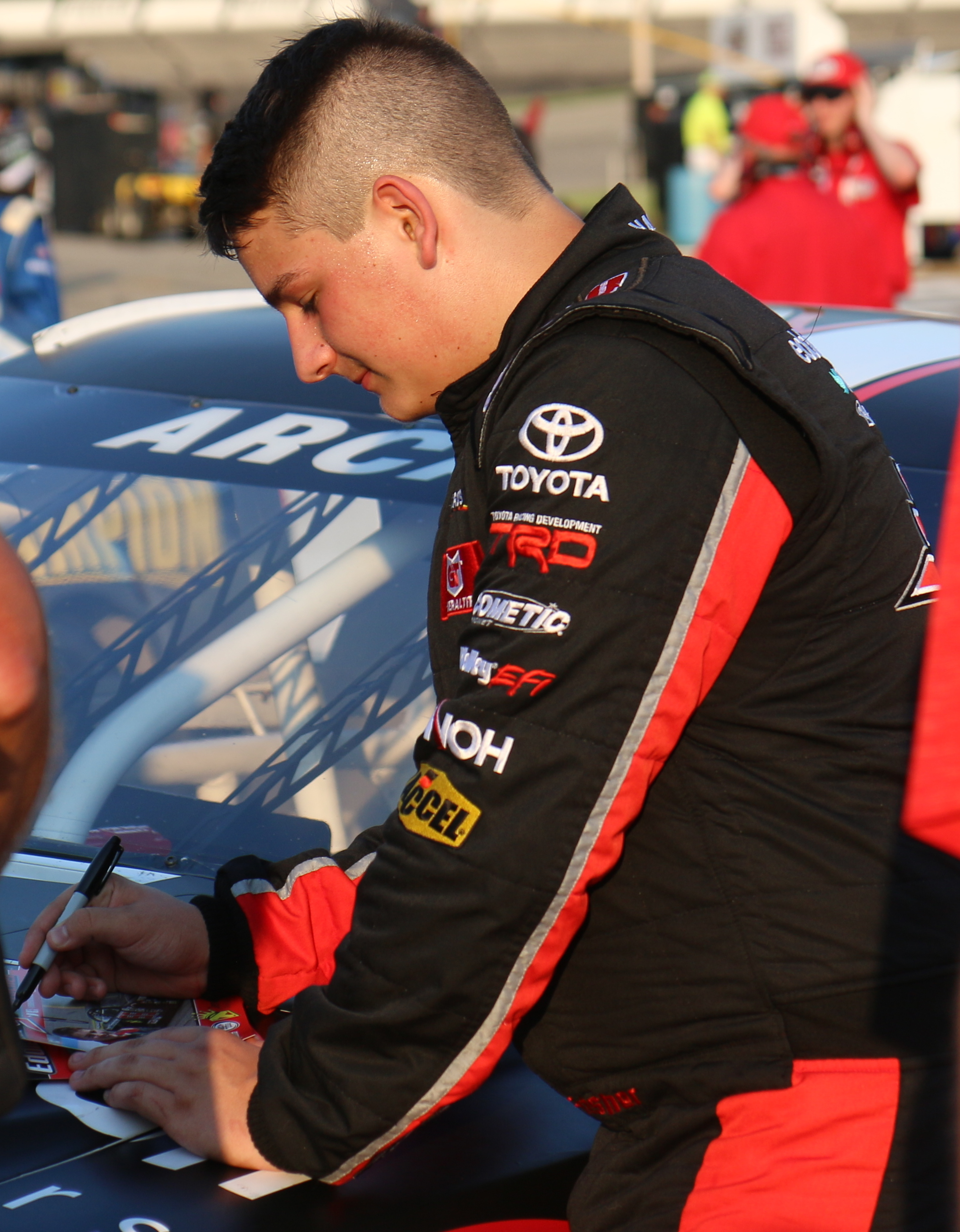
- Fatscher at Madison International Speedway in 2018
- Born: May 1, 2002 (age 24); Long Island, New York, U.S.

ARCA Menards Series career
- 3 races run over 1 year
- Best finish: 38th (2018)
- First race: 2018 Menards 200 Presented by Federated Car Care (Toledo)
- Last race: 2018 Sioux Chief PowerPEX 250 (Elko)
Wins	Top tens	Poles
0	2	0
- Statistics up to date as of January 19, 2025.

Eddie Fatscher (born May 1, 2002) is an American former professional stock car racing driver who has competed in the ARCA Racing Series for three races in 2018, getting a best finish of eighth at Madison International Speedway.

Fatscher also previously competed in series such as the ASA CRA Super Series, the PASS National Championship Super Late Model Series, the CRA JEGS All-Stars Tour, and the INEX Summer Shootout.

== Motorsports results ==
=== ARCA Racing Series ===
(key) (Bold – Pole position awarded by qualifying time. Italics – Pole position earned by points standings or practice time. * – Most laps led.)

ARCA Racing Series results
Year	Team	No.	Make	1	2	3	4	5	6	7	8	9	10	11	12	13	14	15	16	17	18	19	20	ARSC	Pts	Ref
2018	Venturini Motorsports	55	Toyota	DAY	NSH	SLM	TAL	TOL; 14	CLT	POC	MCH					ELK; 9	POC	ISF	BLN	DSF	SLM	IRP	KAN	38th	535	
2018	Venturini Motorsports	20	Toyota									MAD; 8	GTW	CHI	IOW									38th	535	
