= Matt Dooley =

American racing driver

- Born: April 16, 1996 (age 30); Brooks, Georgia, U.S.

ARCA Menards Series career
- 3 races run over 2 years
- Best finish: 73rd (2019)
- First race: 2018 Kentuckiana Ford Dealers ARCA 200 (Salem)
- Last race: 2019 Pensacola 200 (Pensacola)
Wins	Top tens	Poles
0	0	0
- Statistics up to date as of January 31, 2025.

Matt Dooley (born April 16, 1996) is an American professional stock car racing driver who has previously competed in the ARCA Menards Series from 2018 to 2019.

Dooley has also previously competed in series such as the Southern All Star Dirt Racing Series, the Crate Racin' USA Dirt Late Model Series, the Crate Racin' USA $100,000 Challenge, and the World of Outlaws Late Model Series.

== Motorsports results ==
=== ARCA Menards Series ===
(key) (Bold – Pole position awarded by qualifying time. Italics – Pole position earned by points standings or practice time. * – Most laps led.)

ARCA Menards Series results
Year	Team	No.	Make	1	2	3	4	5	6	7	8	9	10	11	12	13	14	15	16	17	18	19	20	AMSC	Pts	Ref
2018	Fast Track Racing	11	Toyota	DAY	NSH	SLM; 23	TAL	TOL	CLT	POC	MCH	MAD												73rd	245	
2018	Fast Track Racing	10	Toyota										GTW; 20	CHI	IOW	ELK	POC	ISF	BLN	DSF	SLM	IRP	KAN	73rd	245	
2019	Fast Track Racing	11	Ford	DAY	FIF; 18	SLM	TAL	NSH	TOL	CLT	POC	MCH	MAD	GTW	CHI	ELK	IOW	POC	ISF	DSF	SLM	IRP	KAN	74th	140	
