= Thomas Praytor =

American racecar driver

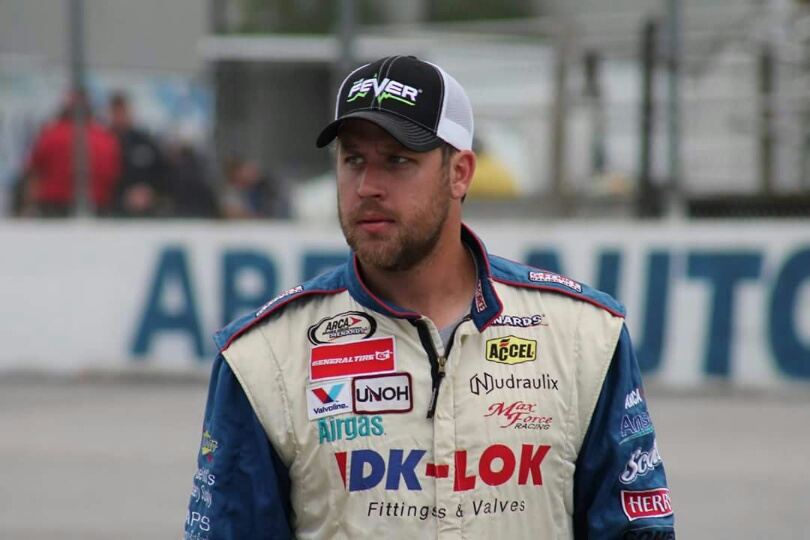
- Praytor in 2016
- Born: Thomas Praytor IV; February 28, 1990 (age 36); Mobile, Alabama, U.S.

ARCA Menards Series career
- 113 races run over 11 years
- Best finish: 5th (2016)
- First race: 2012 Mobile ARCA 200 (Mobile)
- Last race: 2022 General Tire 200 (Talladega)
Wins	Top tens	Poles
0	9	0
- Statistics up to date as of August 11, 2025.

Thomas "Moose" Praytor IV (born February 28, 1990) is an American former professional stock car racing driver who last competed part-time in the ARCA Menards Series, driving the No. 9 Chevrolet for his family team, Max Force Racing.

== Racing career ==
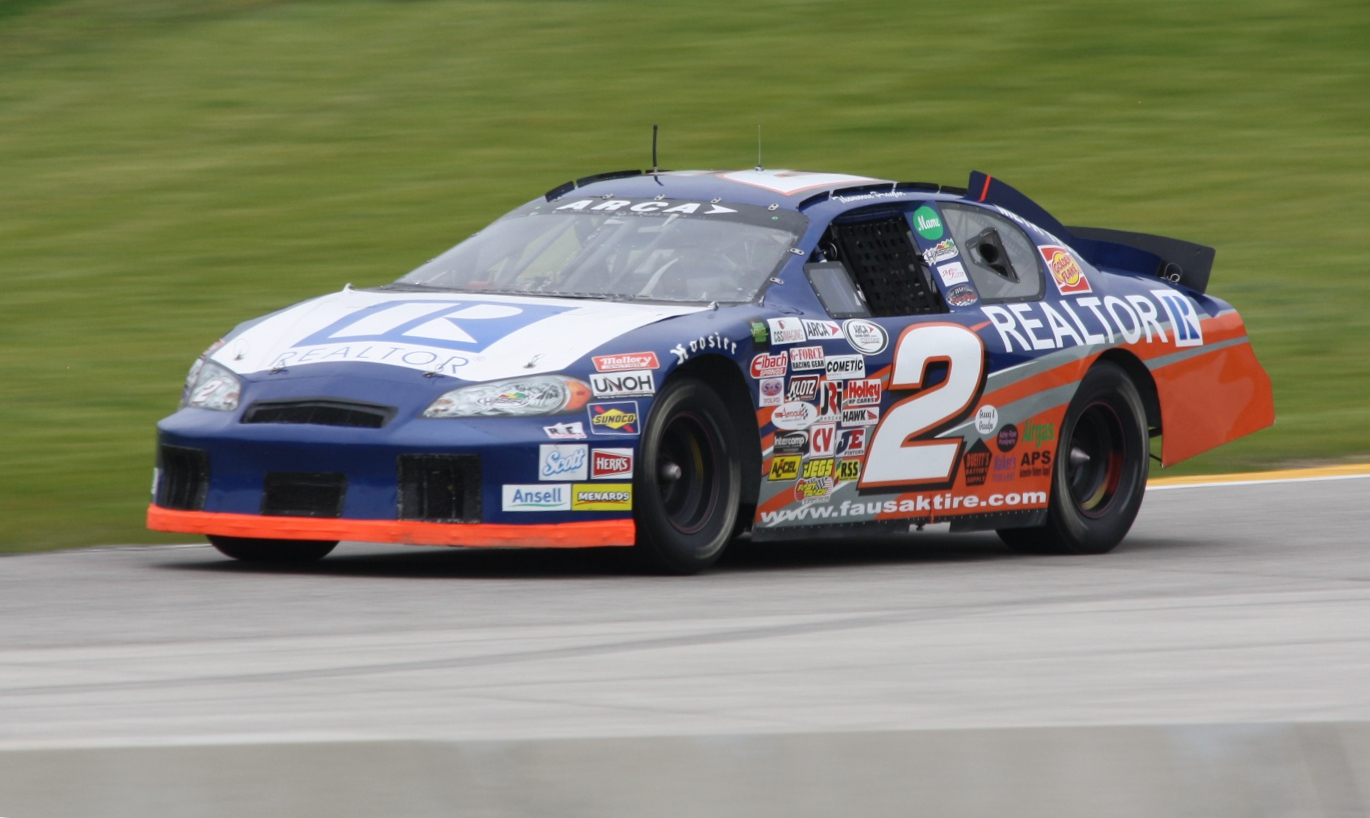
Praytor's No. 2 for Hixson Motorsports at Road America in 2013.

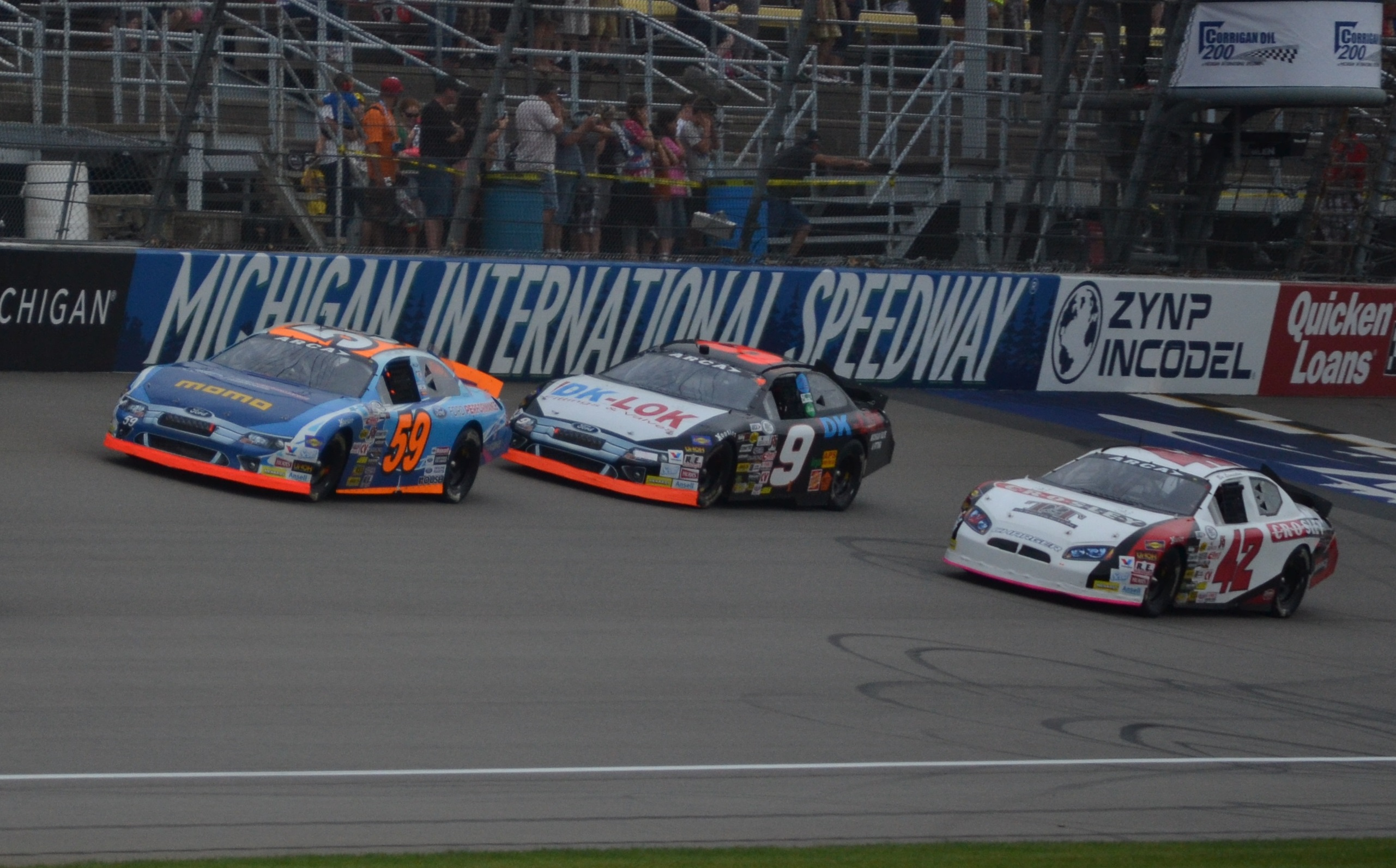
Praytor's No. 9 at Michigan in 2015.

Praytor started racing at eight years old in a borrowed yard kart from a family friend. He quickly progressed from karts to Bandoleros, where Praytor would drive one that was sponsored by The Outdoor Channel. He later began racing late models, running in the Southeast and picking up three US Army Rookie of the Year titles, local and state titles. Praytor and the Max Force Racing team earned the Ironman Status of the Gulf Coast competing in every Pro and Super Late Model Race at Mobile International Speedway and Five Flags Speedway while finishing in the top 10 of the Championship standings at both tracks.

Praytor made his first ARCA Racing Series start at the inaugural ARCA Mobile 200 at the Mobile International Speedway in 2012. He made later starts at Talladega Superspeedway and also saw starts with Venturini Motorsports. In the 2013 season, Praytor ran for rookie of the year as it was his first full season in ARCA. He drove the No. 2 Ford/Chevrolet for Hixson Motorsports and finished the season ninth in points and also earning the HG Adcox Sportsmanship Award. Returning to the Hixson No. 2 in 2014, Praytor acquired sponsorship DK-LOK Fittings and Valves and ended the season eighth in points. Praytor was also named the Hard Charger Driver after the Herr's Chase the Taste 200 in Winchester. For the 2015 season, Praytor and his father Tommy started their team, Max Force Racing, which fielded the No. 9 DK-LOK Ford for Praytor, who would finish ninth in points. The team was named in memory of Thomas's brother Max, who died in June 2001.

Praytor statistically had his best season in 2016. Competing in all twenty events and earning four top-ten finishes, he went on to finish fifth in season points. The following year, Praytor dropped to seventh in points, not earning a top-ten that year but still having a consistent season overall.

In 2018, the team would cut back their schedule, only running the first four races before taking a break. The team would return to field their No. 9 car for Jesse Iwuji at Chicago. Additionally, the Max Force team entered a second car at Daytona, the No. 99, for Ronnie Osmer. Their only races in 2019 came at Talladega, where Praytor would finish 20th in the race. Their next race would not come until Daytona in 2020, where it was later revealed that they took most of the 2019 season off so Praytor could spend time with his newborn son, (Hugh) Thomas Praytor V.

== Personal life ==
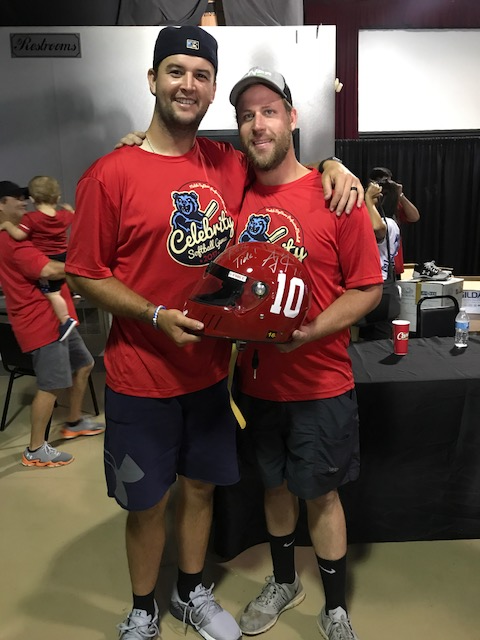
Praytor and McCarron pose for a picture with Praytor's helmet that they would donate.

Praytor was born and raised in Mobile, Alabama, and is the son of local realtor and owner of Praytor Realty, Thomas ("Tommy") Praytor III, who also used to drive racecars.

Praytor is nicknamed "Moose". The name derived from one of Praytor's first cars being sponsored by The Outdoor Channel and featuring a giant Moose coming out of the rear wheel well. When that paint scheme was run, the name "Thomas" above the window net on the car was changed to "Thomoose", which was later shortened to "Moose" and the nickname stuck. Every car Praytor has driven since then has had "Thomoose Praytor" above the window net.

Praytor is a weekly host on the Inside ARCA Racing radio show on WNSP, a station in his home state of Alabama. Praytor's segment, the "Moose Call", is named after his nickname.

In 2008, Praytor's team had a car for sale, which led to a partnership with Warner Brothers Pictures for the film series Final Destination's fourth installment, The Final Destination. Filmed at Mobile International Speedway, Praytor and fellow driver David Ellis worked as stunt drivers for the film.

During the 2013 season, Praytor joined up with Alabama Crimson Tide quarterback A. J. McCarron to design a McCarron replica helmet; Praytor wore the helmet at Daytona International Speedway and Talladega, after which it was donated to the Alabama Institute of the Deaf and Blind to benefit the annual Race Fever Action.

On May 9, 2022, it was revealed that Praytor was diagnosed with rhabdomyolysis. On lap five of the 2022 General Tire 200, Praytor lost movement in his left arm and leg. He would drive with his right hand, until the red flag came out with 10 laps to go. He went through a driver change, with Sean Corr taking over his car for the remaining ten laps. Medical personnel removed Praytor from the car, where he was transported to the infield care center. He had flu-like symptoms just a few days prior to the race.

== Motorsports career results ==
=== ARCA Menards Series ===
(key) (Bold – Pole position awarded by qualifying time. Italics – Pole position earned by points standings or practice time. * – Most laps led.)

ARCA Menards Series results
Year	Team	No.	Make	1	2	3	4	5	6	7	8	9	10	11	12	13	14	15	16	17	18	19	20	21	AMSC	Pts	Ref
2012	Andy Belmont Racing	5	Ford	DAY	MOB; 34	SLM																			58th	370	
2012	Andy Belmont Racing	2	Ford				TAL; 20	TOL	ELK	POC	MCH	WIN	NJE	IRP	IOW	CHI	POC	BLN	ISF						58th	370	
2012	Venturini Motorsports	35	Chevy																	MAD; 28					58th	370	
2012	Venturini Motorsports	66	Toyota																		SLM; 28	DSF	KAN		58th	370	
2013	Hixson Motorsports	2	Ford	DAY; 22			TAL; 22			POC; 16	MCH; 10			CHI; 23									KEN; 19	KAN; 19	9th	4210	
2013	Hixson Motorsports	2	Dodge		MOB; 16	SLM; 21																			9th	4210	
2013	Hixson Motorsports	2	Chevy					TOL; 18	ELK; 10			ROA; 16	WIN; 9		NJE; 17	POC; 24	BLN; 18	ISF; 22	MAD; 14	DSF; 20	IOW; 21	SLM; 17			9th	4210	
2014	Hixson Motorsports	2	Chevy	DAY; 31			TAL; 22		NJE; 15			ELK; 15	WIN; 12					ISF; 15	MAD; 13	DSF; 13					7th	3950	
2014	Hixson Motorsports	2	Ford		MOB; 11	SLM; 11		TOL; 21		POC; 13	MCH; 14			CHI; 18	IRP; 16	POC; 16	BLN; 20				SLM; 13	KEN; 21	KAN; 20		7th	3950	
2015	Max Force Racing	9	Ford	DAY; 24	MOB; 7	NSH; 10	SLM; 15	TAL; 20	TOL; 16	NJE; 15	POC; 16	MCH; 17	CHI; 21	WIN; 15	IOW; 18	IRP; 19		BLN; 18	ISF; 16	DSF; 13	SLM; 18	KEN; 16	KAN; 14		8th	3930	
2015	Max Force Racing	12	Chevy														POC; 28								8th	3930	
2016	Max Force Racing	9	Ford	DAY; 14	NSH; 18	SLM; 17	TAL; 16	TOL; 14	NJE; 21	POC; 20	MCH; 14	MAD; 9	WIN; 11	IOW; 15	IRP; 15	POC; 21	BLN; 8	ISF; 8	DSF; 9	SLM; 14	CHI; 15	KEN; 14	KAN; 15		5th	4055	
2017	Max Force Racing	9	Ford	DAY; 29	NSH; 28	SLM; 14	TAL; 12	TOL; 14	ELK; 15	POC; 24	MCH; 19	MAD; 13	IOW; 18	IRP; 17	POC; 22	WIN; 14	ISF; 13	ROA; 19	DSF; 11	SLM; 16	CHI; 30	KEN; 14	KAN; 20		7th	3790	
2018	Max Force Racing	9	Chevy	DAY; 14			TAL; 21	TOL	CLT	POC	MCH	MAD	GTW	CHI	IOW	ELK	POC	ISF	BLN	DSF	SLM	IRP	KAN		37th	560	
2018	Max Force Racing	9	Ford		NSH; 18	SLM; 19																			37th	560	
2019	Max Force Racing	9	Chevy	DAY	FIF	SLM	TAL; 20	NSH	TOL	CLT	POC	MCH	MAD	CHI	GTW	ELK	IOW	POC	ISF	DSF	SLM	IRP	KAN		77th	130	
2020	Max Force Racing	9	Chevy	DAY; 11	PHO	TAL	POC	IRP	KEN	IOW	KAN	TOL	TOL	MCH	DAY	GTW	L44	TOL	BRI	WIN	MEM	ISF	KAN		60th	33	
2021	Max Force Racing	9	Chevy	DAY	PHO	TAL; 17	KAN	TOL	CLT	MOH	POC	ELK	BLN	IOW	WIN	GLN	MCH	ISF	MLW	DSF	BRI	SLM	KAN		101st	27	
2022	Max Force Racing	9	Chevy	DAY	PHO	TAL; 19	KAN	CLT	IOW	BLN	ELK	MOH	POC	IRP	MCH	GLN	ISF	MLW	DSF	KAN	BRI	SLM	TOL		104th	25	

^{*} Season still in progress
^{1} Ineligible for series points
