= Tommy Vigh Jr. =

American racing driver

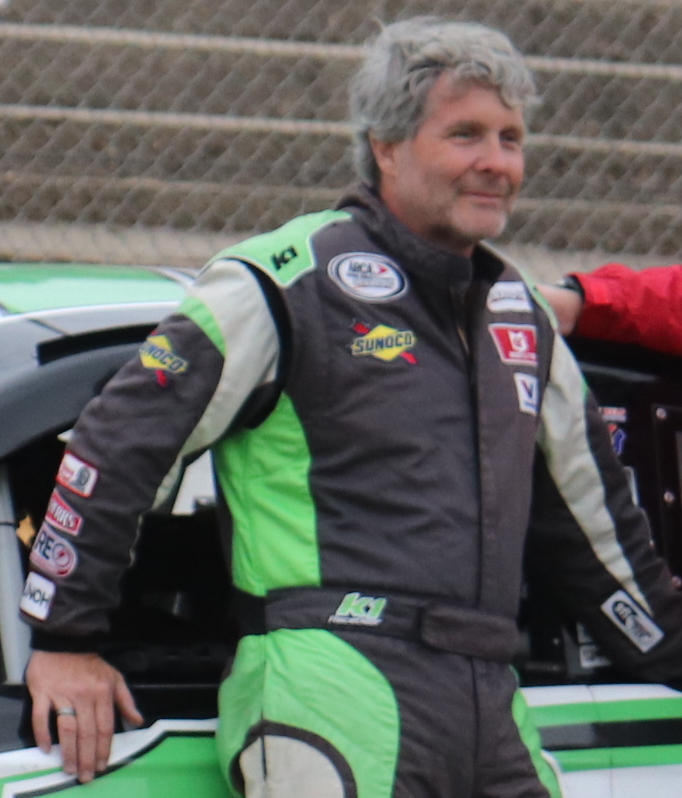
- Vigh in 2019
- Born: Thomas Vigh Jr. November 27, 1964 (age 61); Parsippany-Troy Hills, New Jersey, U.S.

ARCA Menards Series career
- 26 races run over 4 years
- ARCA no., team: No. TBA (Fast Track Racing)
- Best finish: 6th (2019)
- First race: 2021 Herr's Potato Chips 200 (Madison)
- Last race: 2022 General Tire 150 (Charlotte)
Wins	Top tens	Poles
0	1	0

ARCA Menards Series East career
- 2 races run over 2 years
- Best finish: 43rd (2020)
- First race: 2020 General Tire 125 (Dover)
- Last race: 2022 General Tire 125 (Dover)
Wins	Top tens	Poles
0	0	0

Thomas Vigh Jr. (born November 27, 1964) is an American professional stock car racing driver. He last competed in the ARCA Menards Series, driving for Fast Track Racing. He competed part-time for the team in 2018 and full-time in 2019, both in the team's No. 10 car. In 2019, he was the Rookie of the Year award winner.

== Racing career ==
Vigh began his racing career on local dirt tracks prior to racing in ARCA. He started racing in 1996, competing in street stock racing events, and soon after in pro stock and sportsman races as well, finishing fifth in the OCFS Sportsman Series standings in 2018.

Vigh made his first three ARCA starts for Andy Hillenburg's Fast Track Racing team, driving their No. 10 car at Madison as well as the two dirt races at Springfield and DuQuoin with sponsorship from Extreme Kleaner. He got top-15 finishes in each race, with a 15th-place finish at Madison and 13ths on both dirt tracks.

Vigh and his sponsor returned to Fast Track and the No. 10 to run the 2019 season-opener at Daytona, which later turned into a full-season run for rookie of the year by April.

Because rookie Christian Eckes won the championship, Vigh became ineligible to also win the rookie of the year award in addition to his title according to ARCA rules, so Vigh, who was second place behind Eckes in rookie points, was given the award at season's-end. He became the oldest rookie of the year winner in ARCA Series history, earning it at age 54.

Vigh did not return to the No. 10 full-time in 2020, and was replaced in that ride by Ryan Huff. However, he did go back to running part-time for Fast Track, with his first start of the season coming at Talladega. After initially being on the entry list in the team's No. 11 car, the team moved him to the No. 01 (which was to be driven by Dick Doheny) before the race due to Willie Mullins securing a ride with the team in the days leading up to the race, where he was put in the No. 11. Vigh finished nineteenth in both of his ARCA starts in 2020, his second coming at Pocono Raceway. He also made one start for Fast Track Racing in the ARCA Menards Series East at Dover.

Vigh stated prior to the 2020 season that he would be competing in dirt modified races at Orange County Fair Speedway as well as in street stock events again.

== Personal life ==
Vigh is from Otisville, New York, although he currently lives in Parsippany, New Jersey.

Vigh and his wife Pamela Van Dunk own Big Momma Motorsports, which is Vigh's street stock and sportsman team.

In addition to racing, Vigh works as a shop fabricator for Statewide Line Striping and has been a longtime ambassador for his sponsor, Extreme Energy Solutions, based in Sparta, New Jersey.

== Motorsports career results ==
=== ARCA Menards Series ===
(key) (Bold – Pole position awarded by qualifying time. Italics – Pole position earned by points standings or practice time. * – Most laps led.)

ARCA Menards Series results
Year	Team	No.	Make	1	2	3	4	5	6	7	8	9	10	11	12	13	14	15	16	17	18	19	20	AMSC	Pts	Ref
2018	Fast Track Racing	10	Toyota	DAY	NSH	SLM	TAL	TOL	CLT	POC	MCH	MAD; 15	GTW	CHI	IOW	ELK	POC	ISF; 13	BLN	DSF; 13	SLM	IRP	KAN	40th	495	
2019	Fast Track Racing	10	Ford	DAY; 23	FIF; 13	SLM; 11		NSH; 12	TOL; 9	CLT; 15	POC; 17	MCH; 17	MAD; 11	GTW; 19	CHI; 17	ELK; 15	IOW; 19	POC; 17	ISF; 19	DSF; 13	SLM; 19	IRP; 12	KAN; 19	6th	3995	
2019	Fast Track Racing	10	Toyota				TAL; 24																	6th	3995	
2020	Fast Track Racing	01	Toyota	DAY	PHO	TAL; 19																		48th	50	
2020	Fast Track Racing	01	Chevy				POC; 19	IRP	KEN	IOW	KAN	TOL	TOL	MCH	DAY	GTW	L44	TOL	BRI	WIN	MEM	ISF	KAN	48th	50	
2022	Fast Track Racing	12	Chevy	DAY	PHO	TAL	KAN	CLT; 21	IOW	BLN	ELK	MOH	POC	IRP	MCH	GLN	ISF	MLW	DSF	KAN	BRI	SLM	TOL	107th	23	

==== ARCA Menards Series East ====
ARCA Menards Series East results
Year	Team	No.	Make	1	2	3	4	5	6	7	AMSEC	Pts	Ref
2020	Fast Track Racing	10	Chevy	NSM	TOL	DOV; 15	TOL	BRI	FIF		43rd	29	
2022	Fast Track Racing	12	Chevy	NSM	FIF	DOV; 13	NSV	IOW	MLW	BRI	49th	31	

^{*} Season still in progress
^{1} Driver ineligible for series points
