= KBR Development =

Former American stock car racing team

- Owner: Mike Bursley
- Base: Statesville, North Carolina
- Series: ARCA Menards Series
- Race drivers: 28. David Gravel
- Manufacturer: Chevrolet
- Opened: 2018
- Closed: 2020

Career
- Debut: 2018 Menards 200 (Toledo)
- Latest race: 2020 Lucas Oil 200
- Races competed: 25
- Drivers' Championships: 0
- Race victories: 0
- Pole positions: 2

KBR Development was an American professional stock car racing team that last competed in the ARCA Menards Series. The team, founded by Mike Bursley in 2018, last fielded the No. 28 Chevrolet SS part-time for David Gravel. Veteran ARCA driver Frank Kimmel served as the team's general manager. KBR Development had a technical alliance with GMS Racing.

== ARCA Menards Series ==
=== Car No. 35/28 history ===
==== 2018 ====
In 2018, the team would make their debut at Toledo Speedway, with Carson Hocevar driving the No. 35 for the team. Hocevar would finish 11th.

==== 2019 ====
On January 11, 2019, the team announced that they had entered a technical alliance with GMS Racing, with equipment bought from MDM Motorsports. Carson Hocevar would drive 11 races for the team, with Brandon McReynolds driving mostly big tracks for the team.

==== 2020 ====
The team would plan to make their second full-time season in 2020, with the team relocating to Statesville, North Carolina and becoming a satellite team of GMS Racing.

On January 10, 2020, the team would announce that dirt racer David Gravel would make his stock car debut for the team, driving the No. 28 at the 2020 Lucas Oil 200.

On January 27, 2020, Venturini Motorsports accused that former employees, Frank Kimmel and Griffin Rider, both who were now employees at KBR Development, had stolen information from the team. Venturini Motorsports had said that in security camera footage, Rider had carried the crew chief's computer into an unknown hauler, had spent approximately 11 minutes with the computer, and returned it, with Rider allegedly stealing information with a USB flash drive. In addition, Venturini Motorsports testified that Kimmel took pictures of Venturini Motorsports' cars.

On May 9, 2020, the team would announce on its website that the team had ceased operations in a statement from Mike Bursley.

==== Car No. 35/28 results ====
(key) (Bold – Pole position awarded by qualifying time. Italics – Pole position earned by points standings or practice time. * – Most laps led.)

Year	Driver	No.	Make	1	2	3	4	5	6	7	8	9	10	11	12	13	14	15	16	17	18	19	20	Owners	Pts
2018	Carson Hocevar	35	Chevrolet	DAY	NSH	SLM	TAL	**TOL**; 11	CLT	POC	MCH	MAD	GTW	CHI	IOW	ELK	POC	ISF	BLN; 4	DSF	SLM	IRP; 3	KAN		
2019	Brandon McReynolds	28	Chevrolet	DAY; 25			TAL; 19			CLT; 20		MCH; 14													
2019	Carson Hocevar	28	Chevrolet		FIF; 17	**SLM**; 3		NSH; 4	TOL; 6				MAD; 6	GTW; 5		ELK; 6	IOW; 4		ISF; 8	DSF; 15	SLM; 7	IRP; 9			
2019	Raphaël Lessard	28	Chevrolet								POC; 4							POC; 5							
2019	Stefan Parsons	28	Chevrolet												CHI; 20										
2019	Sheldon Creed	28	Chevrolet																				KAN; 11		
2020	David Gravel	28	Chevrolet	DAY; 12	PHO	TAL	POC	IRP	KEN	IOW	KAN	TOL	TOL	MCH	DAY	GTW	L44	TOL	BRI	WIN	MEM	ISF	KAN		
