= 2024 Hard Rock Bet 200 =

1st race of the 2024 ARCA Menards Series

Race details
- Race 1 of 20 of the 2024 ARCA Menards Series
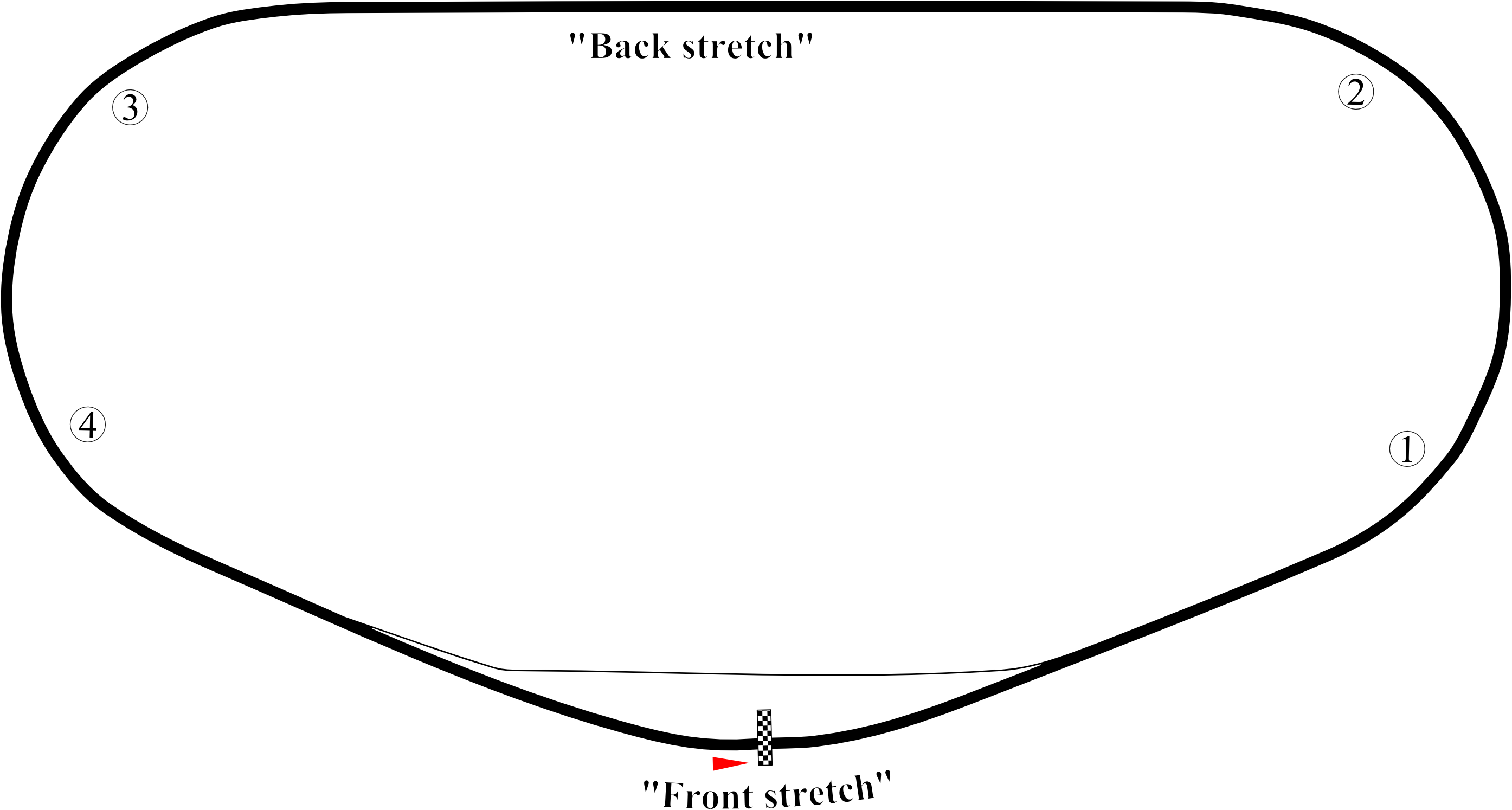
- Date: February 16–17, 2024
- Official name: 61st Annual Hard Rock Bet 200
- Location: Daytona International Speedway, Daytona Beach, Florida
- Course: Permanent racing facility
- Course length: 2.5 miles (4 km)
- Distance: 84 laps, 210 mi (338 km)
- Scheduled distance: 80 laps, 200 mi (321 km)
- Average speed: 98.987 mph (159.304 km/h)

Pole position
Driver	Willie Mullins	Mullins Racing
- Time: 48.982

Most laps led
Driver	Jake Finch	Venturini Motorsports
- Laps: 65

Winner
No. 55	Gus Dean	Venturini Motorsports

Television in the United States
- Network: FS2
- Announcers: Jamie Little, Phil Parsons, and Austin Cindric

Radio in the United States
- Radio: MRN

The 2024 Hard Rock Bet 200 was the first stock car race of the 2024 ARCA Menards Series season, and the 61st running of the event. The race was originally scheduled to be held on Saturday, February 17, 2024, but due to the forecasted inclement weather for Saturday, the race was moved up to Friday, February 16, immediately following the NASCAR Truck Series race on the same day. The race was held at Daytona International Speedway in Daytona Beach, Florida, a 2.5 mile (4 km) permanent tri-oval shaped asphalt superspeedway. The race was originally scheduled to be contested over 80 laps, but was extended to 84 laps due to a NASCAR overtime finish. In a wild and wreck-filled race, Gus Dean, driving for Venturini Motorsports, would hold off the field in a one lap restart, and won the race after a vicious crash occurred on the final lap. This was Dean's third career ARCA Menards Series win, and his first of the season. Dean's teammate, Jake Finch, had dominated the entire race, leading a race-high 65 laps before being involved in the last lap incident. To fill out the podium, Thomas Annunziata, driving for Jeff McClure Racing, and Greg Van Alst, driving for his own team, Van Alst Motorsports, would finish 2nd and 3rd, respectively.

== Report ==
Daytona International Speedway is a race track in Daytona Beach, Florida that is one of five superspeedways, the others being Pocono Raceway, Indianapolis Motor Speedway, Michigan International Speedway, and Talladega Superspeedway.

=== Background ===
Daytona International Speedway, the circuit where the race will be held.

Daytona International Speedway is one of three superspeedways to hold NASCAR races, the other two being Atlanta Motor Speedway and Talladega Superspeedway. The standard track at Daytona International Speedway is a four-turn superspeedway that is 2.5 miles (4.0 km) long. The track's turns are banked at 31 degrees, while the front stretch, the location of the finish line, is banked at 18 degrees.

==== Entry list ====
50 drivers were entered for the Sioux Chief Fast Track 200, one of the largest entries in the ARCA Menards Series in recent years. It will also mark the first time since 2017 that drivers will fail to qualify for an ARCA event.

- (R) denotes rookie driver.

#	Driver	Team	Make	Sponsor
01	Takuma Koga	Fast Track Racing	Toyota	Macnica / CKB
02	Leland Honeyman	Young's Motorsports	Chevrolet	Young's Motorsports
2	Andrés Pérez de Lara	Rev Racing	Chevrolet	Max Siegel Inc.
03	Alex Clubb	Clubb Racing Inc.	Ford	Race Parts Liquidators
3	Willie Mullins	Mullins Racing	Ford	CorvetteParts.net / Crow Wing Recycling
4	Dale Quarterley	1/4 Ley Racing	Chevrolet	Van Dyk Recycling Solutions / Motul
06	Tommy O'Leary IV	Wayne Peterson Racing	Chevrolet	A&D Auto Parts & Repair
6	Lavar Scott (R)	Rev Racing	Chevrolet	Max Siegel Inc.
07	Jeff Scofield	Scofield Motorsports	Chevrolet	JXT Transport
7	Eric Caudell	CCM Racing	Toyota	Coble Enterprises / Red Tide Canopies
08	Patrick Emerling	SS-Green Light Racing	Ford	Southern Tier Security
8	Sean Corr	Empire Racing	Chevrolet	NESCO / The Trans Group
10	Ed Pompa	Fast Track Racing	Chevrolet	HYTORC of New York / Double "H" Ranch
11	Bryce Haugeberg	Fast Track Racing	Toyota	Karcher / Brenco
12	Ryan Roulette	Fast Track Racing	Ford	Veterans of Foreign Wars
13	Armani Williams	MBM Motorsports	Toyota	Blue Sprig
15	Kris Wright	Venturini Motorsports	Toyota	FNB Corporation
17	Marco Andretti	Cook Racing Technologies	Chevrolet	Group 1001
18	Tanner Gray	Joe Gibbs Racing	Toyota	Place of Hope
20	Jake Finch	Venturini Motorsports	Toyota	Phoenix Construction
22	Amber Balcaen	Venturini Motorsports	Toyota	ICON Direct
25	Toni Breidinger	Venturini Motorsports	Toyota	Celsius
27	Tim Richmond	Richmond Motorsports	Toyota	Richmond Motorsports
28	Shane van Gisbergen (R)	Pinnacle Racing Group	Chevrolet	WeatherTech
30	Justin Bonsignore	Rette Jones Racing	Ford	Hard Rock Bet
31	Mitch Gibson	Rise Motorsports	Chevrolet	National Police Association
32	Christian Rose	AM Racing	Ford	West Virginia Department of Tourism
34	Isaac Johnson	Van Alst Motorsports	Ford	Endress & Hauser
35	Greg Van Alst	Van Alst Motorsports	Chevrolet	Zaki Ali Injury & Criminal Attorney
36	Ryan Huff	Ryan Huff Motorsports	Ford	Southeastern Services
44	Thomas Annunziata	Jeff McClure Racing	Chevrolet	Nerd Focus
47	Becca Monopoli	Mixon Racing	Toyota	Skip's Western Outfitters
48	Brad Smith	Brad Smith Motorsports	Ford	Brad Smith Motorsports
55	Gus Dean	Venturini Motorsports	Toyota	Dean Custom Air
57	Hunter Deshautelle	Brother-In-Law Racing	Chevrolet	O. B. Builders
62	Steve Lewis Jr.	Steve Lewis Racing	Chevrolet	Telco Construction / Jeffery Machine
63	John Aramendia	Spraker Racing Enterprises	Chevrolet	1st Call Plumbing Heating & Air
68	Gil Linster	Kimmel Racing	Ford	HOOSH.com
69	Scott Melton	Kimmel Racing	Ford	Melton-McFadden Insurance Agency
73	Andy Jankowiak	KLAS Motorsports	Ford	V1 Fiber / Whelen
74	Mandy Chick	Team Chick Motorsports	Chevrolet	Dynamic Drivelines / FK Rod Ends
75	Bryan Dauzat	Brother-In-Law Racing	Chevrolet	O. B. Builders
86	Cody Dennison (R)	Clubb Racing Inc.	Ford	Toolganizer
87	Chuck Buchanan Jr.	Charles Buchanan Racing	Chevrolet	Spring Drug
88	A. J. Moyer	Moyer-Petroniro Racing	Chevrolet	River's Edge Cottages & RV Park
93	Caleb Costner (R)	Costner Weaver Motorsports	Chevrolet	Lickety Lew's / Heritage Water Systems
95	Brayton Laster	MAN Motorsports	Toyota	@Cyber_Fox on X / Caraggio.com
97	Jason Kitzmiller	CR7 Motorsports	Chevrolet	A. L. L. Construction
98	Dale Shearer	Shearer Speed Racing	Toyota	Shearer Speed Racing
99	Michael Maples (R)	Fast Track Racing	Chevrolet	Don Ray Petroleum LLC
Official entry list

== Practice ==
The first and only practice session was held on Thursday, February 15, at 4:05 PM EST, and would last for 50 minutes. Marco Andretti, driving for Cook Racing Technologies, would set the fastest time in the session, with a lap of 48.600, and a speed of 185.185 mph (298.026 km/h).

Pos.	#	Driver	Team	Make	Time	Speed
1	17	Marco Andretti	Cook Racing Technologies	Chevrolet	48.600	185.185
2	08	Patrick Emerling	SS-Green Light Racing	Ford	48.601	185.181
3	3	Willie Mullins	Mullins Racing	Ford	48.676	184.896
Full practice results

== Qualifying ==
Qualifying was held on Friday, February 16, at 1:30 PM EST. The qualifying system used is a multi-car, multi-lap group-based system. Drivers will be split into different groups of seven to eight drivers. Each group will have four minutes to set a lap time, and the driver who sets the overall fastest lap between the groups will win the pole. The fastest 34 drivers will lock in, with the final 6 spots being reserved for provisional starters.

Willie Mullins, driving for family-owned Mullins Racing, would set the fastest time between the overall groups, with a lap of 48.982, and a speed of 183.741 mph (295.702 km/h).

Brayton Laster, Chuck Buchanan Jr., Hunter Deshautelle, Takuma Koga, A. J. Moyer, Becca Monopoli, Mitch Gibson, Dale Shearer, and Cody Dennison would fail to qualify for the race. Shane van Gisbergen, who originally failed to qualify, was added to the field after Eric Caudell and CCM Racing withdrew from the race.

=== Qualifying results ===
Pos.	#	Driver	Team	Make	Time	Speed
1	3	Willie Mullins	Mullins Racing	Ford	48.982	183.741
2	27	Tim Richmond	Richmond Motorsports	Toyota	49.003	183.662
3	20	Jake Finch	Venturini Motorsports	Toyota	49.024	183.584
4	25	Toni Breidinger	Venturini Motorsports	Toyota	49.044	183.509
5	36	Ryan Huff	Ryan Huff Motorsports	Ford	49.060	183.449
6	30	Justin Bonsignore	Rette Jones Racing	Ford	49.108	183.270
7	68	Gil Linster	Kimmel Racing	Ford	49.703	181.076
8	75	Bryan Dauzat	Brother-In-Law Racing	Chevrolet	49.708	181.057
9	34	Isaac Johnson	Van Alst Motorsports	Ford	49.734	180.963
10	97	Jason Kitzmiller	CR7 Motorsports	Chevrolet	49.735	180.959
11	15	Kris Wright	Venturini Motorsports	Toyota	49.738	180.948
12	11	Bryce Haugeberg	Fast Track Racing	Toyota	49.741	180.937
13	2	Andrés Pérez de Lara	Rev Racing	Chevrolet	49.743	180.930
14	07	Jeff Scofield	Scofield Motorsports	Chevrolet	49.787	180.770
15	18	Tanner Gray	Joe Gibbs Racing	Toyota	49.795	180.741
16	4	Dale Quarterley	1/4 Ley Racing	Chevrolet	49.797	180.734
17	93	Caleb Costner (R)	Costner Weaver Motorsports	Chevrolet	49.806	180.701
18	44	Thomas Annunziata	Jeff McClure Racing	Chevrolet	49.822	180.643
19	32	Christian Rose	AM Racing	Ford	49.825	180.632
20	8	Sean Corr	Empire Racing	Chevrolet	49.841	180.574
21	35	Greg Van Alst	Van Alst Motorsports	Chevrolet	49.845	180.560
22	62	Steve Lewis Jr.	Steve Lewis Racing	Chevrolet	49.860	180.505
23	08	Patrick Emerling	SS-Green Light Racing	Ford	49.951	180.177
24	55	Gus Dean	Venturini Motorsports	Toyota	49.975	180.090
25	17	Marco Andretti	Cook Racing Technologies	Chevrolet	49.987	180.047
26	13	Armani Williams	MBM Motorsports	Toyota	50.029	179.896
27	22	Amber Balcaen	Venturini Motorsports	Toyota	50.310	178.891
28	63	John Aramendia	Spraker Racing Enterprises	Chevrolet	50.311	178.887
29	69	Scott Melton	Kimmel Racing	Ford	50.313	178.880
30	74	Mandy Chick	Team Chick Motorsports	Chevrolet	50.398	178.579
31	6	Lavar Scott (R)	Rev Racing	Chevrolet	50.410	178.536
32	02	Leland Honeyman	Young's Motorsports	Chevrolet	50.422	178.494
33	73	Andy Jankowiak	KLAS Motorsports	Ford	50.534	178.098
34	28	Shane van Gisbergen	Pinnacle Racing Group	Chevrolet	50.927	176.724
35	99	Michael Maples (R)	Fast Track Racing	Chevrolet	51.299	175.442
36	12	Ryan Roulette	Fast Track Racing	Ford	51.309	175.408
37	10	Ed Pompa	Fast Track Racing	Chevrolet	51.661	174.213
38	03	Alex Clubb	Clubb Racing Inc.	Ford	52.615	171.054
39	06	Tommy O'Leary IV	Wayne Peterson Racing	Chevrolet	53.719	167.538
40	48	Brad Smith	Brad Smith Motorsports	Ford	56.317	159.810
Failed to qualify
41	95	Brayton Laster	MAN Motorsports	Toyota	51.374	175.186
42	87	Chuck Buchanan Jr.	Charles Buchanan Racing	Chevrolet	52.042	172.937
43	57	Hunter Deshautelle	Brother-In-Law Racing	Chevrolet	52.331	171.982
44	01	Takuma Koga	Fast Track Racing	Toyota	52.333	171.976
45	88	A. J. Moyer	Moyer-Petroniro Racing	Chevrolet	52.656	170.921
46	47	Becca Monopoli	Mixon Racing	Toyota	54.116	166.309
47	31	Mitch Gibson	Rise Motorsports	Chevrolet	54.892	163.958
48	98	Dale Shearer	Shearer Speed Racing	Toyota	55.408	162.431
49	86	Cody Dennison (R)	Clubb Racing Inc.	Ford	58.535	153.754
Withdrew
50	7	Eric Caudell	CCM Racing	Toyota	49.805	180.705
Official qualifying results

== Race results ==
Fin	St	#	Driver	Team	Make	Laps	Led	Status	Pts
1	25	55	Gus Dean	Venturini Motorsports	Toyota	84	2	Running	47
2	19	44	Thomas Annunziata	Jeff McClure Racing	Chevrolet	84	0	Running	42
3	22	35	Greg Van Alst	Van Alst Motorsports	Chevrolet	84	3	Running	42
4	20	32	Christian Rose	AM Racing	Ford	84	0	Running	40
5	2	27	Tim Richmond	Richmond Motorsports	Toyota	84	0	Running	39
6	10	97	Jason Kitzmiller	CR7 Motorsports	Chevrolet	84	0	Running	38
7	7	68	Gil Linster	Kimmel Racing	Ford	84	0	Running	37
8	38	03	Alex Clubb	Clubb Racing Inc.	Ford	84	0	Running	36
9	27	22	Amber Balcaen	Venturini Motorsports	Toyota	84	0	Running	35
10	33	73	Andy Jankowiak	KLAS Motorsports	Ford	84	0	Running	34
11	3	20	Jake Finch	Venturini Motorsports	Toyota	83	65	Accident	35
12	13	2	Andrés Pérez de Lara	Rev Racing	Chevrolet	83	0	Accident	32
13	26	13	Armani Williams	MBM Motorsports	Toyota	83	0	Accident	31
14	22	62	Steve Lewis Jr.	Steve Lewis Racing	Chevrolet	83	0	Accident	30
15	31	6	Lavar Scott (R)	Rev Racing	Chevrolet	83	0	Accident	29
16	5	36	Ryan Huff	Ryan Huff Motorsports	Ford	83	4	Accident	29
17	23	08	Patrick Emerling	SS-Green Light Racing	Ford	83	0	Accident	27
18	9	34	Isaac Johnson	Van Alst Motorsports	Ford	83	0	Accident	26
19	39	06	Tommy O'Leary IV	Wayne Peterson Racing	Chevrolet	83	0	Accident	25
20	8	75	Hunter Deshautelle	Brother-In-Law Racing	Chevrolet	83	0	Running	24
21	35	99	Michael Maples (R)	Fast Track Racing	Chevrolet	83	0	Running	23
22	40	48	Brad Smith	Brad Smith Motorsports	Ford	81	0	Engine	22
23	36	12	Ryan Roulette	Fast Track Racing	Ford	80	0	Running	21
24	15	18	Tanner Gray	Joe Gibbs Racing	Toyota	77	0	Running	20
25	25	17	Marco Andretti	Cook Racing Technologies	Chevrolet	76	0	Accident	19
26	12	11	Bryce Haugeberg	Fast Track Racing	Toyota	69	0	Running	18
27	29	69	Scott Melton	Kimmel Racing	Ford	61	0	Accident	17
28	1	3	Willie Mullins	Mullins Racing	Ford	61	9	Accident	18
29	34	28	Shane van Gisbergen	Pinnacle Racing Group	Chevrolet	58	0	Running	15
30	20	8	Sean Corr	Empire Racing	Chevrolet	55	1	Oil Line	15
31	32	02	Leland Honeyman	Young's Motorsports	Chevrolet	51	0	Accident	13
32	6	30	Justin Bonsignore	Rette Jones Racing	Ford	43	0	Oil Line	12
33	16	4	Dale Quarterley	1/4 Ley Racing	Chevrolet	40	0	Accident	11
34	30	74	Mandy Chick	Team Chick Motorsports	Chevrolet	17	0	Accident	10
35	17	93	Caleb Costner (R)	Costner Weaver Motorsports	Chevrolet	14	0	Rear End	9
36	14	07	Jeff Scofield	Scofield Motorsports	Chevrolet	6	0	Accident	8
37	4	25	Toni Breidinger	Venturini Motorsports	Toyota	3	0	Accident	7
38	11	15	Kris Wright	Venturini Motorsports	Toyota	3	0	Accident	6
39	28	63	John Aramendia	Spraker Racing Enterprises	Chevrolet	3	0	Accident	5
40	37	10	Ed Pompa	Fast Track Racing	Chevrolet	3	0	Accident	4
Withdrew
		7	Eric Caudell	CCM Racing	Toyota				
Official race results

== Standings after the race ==
Drivers' Championship standings

Pos	Driver	Points
1	Gus Dean	47
2	Thomas Annunziata	42 (-5)
3	Greg Van Alst	42 (–5)
4	Christian Rose	40 (–7)
5	Tim Richmond	39 (–8)
6	Jason Kitzmiller	38 (–9)
7	Gil Linster	37 (–10)
8	Alex Clubb	36 (–11)
9	Amber Balcaen	35 (–12)
10	Jake Finch	35 (–12)

- Note: Only the first 10 positions are included for the driver standings.

Previous race: 2023 Shore Lunch 200	ARCA Menards Series; 2024 season	Next race: 2024 General Tire 150 (Phoenix)
