= 2024 General Tire 200 (Talladega) =

3rd race of the 2024 ARCA Menards Series

Race details
- Race 3 of 20 of the 2024 ARCA Menards Series
- Date: April 20, 2024
- Official name: 62nd Annual General Tire 200
- Location: Talladega Superspeedway in Lincoln, Alabama
- Course: Permanent racing facility
- Course length: 2.66 miles (4.28 km)
- Distance: 76 laps, 202 mi (325 km)
- Scheduled distance: 76 laps, 202 mi (325 km)
- Average speed: 181.219 mph (291.644 km/h)

Pole position
Driver	Jake Finch	Venturini Motorsports
- Grid positions set by competition-based formula

Most laps led
Driver	Jake Finch	Venturini Motorsports
- Laps: 76

Winner
No. 20	Jake Finch	Venturini Motorsports

Television in the United States
- Network: FS1
- Announcers: Jamie Little, Phil Parsons, and Trevor Bayne

Radio in the United States
- Radio: MRN

The 2024 General Tire 200 was the 3rd stock car race of the 2024 ARCA Menards Series season, and the 62nd running of the event. The race was held on Saturday, April 20, 2024, at Talladega Superspeedway in Lincoln, Alabama, a 2.66 mile (4.28 km) permanent quad-oval shaped asphalt superspeedway. The race took the scheduled 76 laps to complete. Jake Finch, driving for Venturini Motorsports, would find redemption from Daytona, and put on a blistering performance, leading every lap of the race to earn his first career ARCA Menards Series win. It was the first Talladega race in series history where a driver led every lap to win the race. To fill out the podium, Kris Wright, driving for Venturini Motorsports, and Tanner Gray, driving for Joe Gibbs Racing, would finish 2nd and 3rd, respectively.

== Report ==
=== Background ===
Talladega Superspeedway, the circuit where the race will be held.

Talladega Superspeedway, formerly known as Alabama International Motor Speedway, is a motorsports complex located north of Talladega, Alabama. It is located on the former Anniston Air Force Base in the small city of Lincoln. A tri-oval, the track was constructed in 1969 by the International Speedway Corporation, a business controlled by the France family. Talladega is most known for its steep banking. The track currently hosts NASCAR's Cup Series, Xfinity Series and Craftsman Truck Series. Talladega is the longest NASCAR oval with a length of 2.66-mile-long (4.28 km) tri-oval like the Daytona International Speedway, which is 2.5-mile-long (4.0 km).

==== Entry list ====
- (R) denotes rookie driver.

#	Driver	Team	Make	Sponsor
0	Ben Peterson	Wayne Peterson Racing	Toyota	Peterson Motorsports
01	Cody Dennison (R)	Fast Track Racing	Ford	ALL CAPS Comics
2	Andrés Pérez de Lara	Rev Racing	Chevrolet	Max Siegel Inc.
03	Alex Clubb	Clubb Racing Inc.	Ford	Race Parts Liquidators
06	Con Nicolopoulos	Wayne Peterson Racing	Ford	Peterson Motorsports
6	Lavar Scott (R)	Rev Racing	Chevrolet	Max Siegel Inc.
7	Eric Caudell	CCM Racing	Toyota	Coble Enterprises / Red Tide Canopies
8	Sean Corr	Empire Racing	Chevrolet	NESCO Bus Sales
10	Ed Pompa	Fast Track Racing	Toyota	HYTORC of New York / Double "H" Ranch
11	Bryce Haugeberg	Fast Track Racing	Toyota	Karcher / Brenco
12	Ryan Roulette	Fast Track Racing	Ford	Bellator Recruiting Academy / VFW
15	Kris Wright	Venturini Motorsports	Toyota	FNB Corporation
18	Tanner Gray	Joe Gibbs Racing	Toyota	Place of Hope
20	Jake Finch	Venturini Motorsports	Toyota	Phoenix Construction
22	Amber Balcaen	Venturini Motorsports	Toyota	ICON Direct
25	Toni Breidinger	Venturini Motorsports	Toyota	Raising Cane's Chicken Fingers
27	Tim Richmond	Richmond Motorsports	Toyota	Immigration Law Center
30	Frankie Muniz	Rette Jones Racing	Ford	Ford Performance
31	Casey Carden	Rise Motorsports	Chevrolet	Nationalpolice.org
32	Christian Rose	AM Racing	Ford	West Virginia Department of Tourism
35	Greg Van Alst	Greg Van Alst Motorsports	Chevrolet	Zaki Ali Injury & Criminal Attorney
44	Thomas Annunziata	Jeff McClure Racing	Chevrolet	Nerd Focus
48	Brad Smith	Brad Smith Motorsports	Ford	Copraya.com
55	Gus Dean	Venturini Motorsports	Toyota	Hardcore Fish & Game
57	Hunter Deshautelle	Brother-In-Law Racing	Chevrolet	O. B. Builders
68	Jeff Scofield	Kimmel Racing	Chevrolet	JXT Transportation
69	Scott Melton	Kimmel Racing	Ford	Melton-McFadden Insurance Agency
73	Andy Jankowiak	KLAS Motorsports	Ford	Acacia Energy
87	Chuck Buchanan Jr.	Charles Buchanan Racing	Chevrolet	Spring Drug
88	A. J. Moyer	Moyer-Petroniro Racing	Chevrolet	River's Edge Cottages & RV Park
93	Caleb Costner (R)	Costner Weaver Motorsports	Chevrolet	Lickety Lew's / Heritage Water Systems
97	Jason Kitzmiller	CR7 Motorsports	Chevrolet	A.L.L. Construction
98	Dale Shearer	Shearer Speed Racing	Toyota	Shearer Speed Racing
99	Michael Maples (R)	Fast Track Racing	Chevrolet	Don Ray Petroleum LLC.
Official entry list

== Practice ==
Practice was held on Friday, April 19, at 3:00 PM CST, and would last for 1 hour. For practice, drivers were separated into different groups and had a specified number of laps to set a fastest time. Bryce Haugeberg, driving for Fast Track Racing, would set the fastest time between all the groups, with a lap of 53.331, and a speed of 179.558 mph (288.971 km/h).

Pos.	#	Driver	Team	Make	Time	Speed
1	11	Bryce Haugeberg	Fast Track Racing	Toyota	53.331	179.558
2	15	Kris Wright	Venturini Motorsports	Toyota	53.345	179.511
3	25	Toni Breidinger	Venturini Motorsports	Toyota	53.398	179.333
Full practice results

== Starting lineup ==
No qualifying session was held. Instead, the starting lineup was determined by owners points from the previous season. As a result, Jake Finch, driving for Venturini Motorsports, started on the pole.

=== Starting lineup ===
Pos.	#	Driver	Team	Make
1	20	Jake Finch	Venturini Motorsports	Toyota
2	18	Tanner Gray	Joe Gibbs Racing	Toyota
3	2	Andrés Pérez de Lara	Rev Racing	Chevrolet
4	25	Toni Breidinger	Venturini Motorsports	Toyota
5	15	Kris Wright	Venturini Motorsports	Toyota
6	32	Christian Rose	AM Racing	Ford
7	30	Frankie Muniz	Rette Jones Racing	Ford
8	11	Bryce Haugeberg	Fast Track Racing	Toyota
9	99	Michael Maples (R)	Fast Track Racing	Chevrolet
10	10	Ed Pompa	Fast Track Racing	Toyota
11	12	Ryan Roulette	Fast Track Racing	Ford
12	03	Alex Clubb	Clubb Racing Inc.	Ford
13	06	Con Nicolopoulos	Wayne Peterson Racing	Ford
14	48	Brad Smith	Brad Smith Motorsports	Ford
15	55	Gus Dean	Venturini Motorsports	Toyota
16	6	Lavar Scott (R)	Rev Racing	Chevrolet
17	69	Scott Melton	Kimmel Racing	Ford
18	31	Casey Carden	Rise Motorsports	Chevrolet
19	73	Andy Jankowiak	KLAS Motorsports	Ford
20	01	Cody Dennison (R)	Fast Track Racing	Ford
21	35	Greg Van Alst	Greg Van Alst Motorsports	Chevrolet
22	97	Jason Kitzmiller	CR7 Motorsports	Chevrolet
23	8	Sean Corr	Empire Racing	Chevrolet
24	22	Amber Balcaen	Venturini Motorsports	Toyota
25	93	Caleb Costner (R)	Costner Weaver Motorsports	Chevrolet
26	88	A. J. Moyer	Moyer-Petroniro Racing	Chevrolet
27	98	Dale Shearer	Shearer Speed Racing	Toyota
28	68	Jeff Scofield	Kimmel Racing	Chevrolet
29	44	Thomas Annunziata	Jeff McClure Racing	Chevrolet
30	87	Chuck Buchanan Jr.	Charles Buchanan Racing	Chevrolet
31	7	Eric Caudell	CCM Racing	Toyota
32	27	Tim Richmond	Richmond Motorsports	Toyota
33	57	Hunter Deshautelle	Brother-In-Law Racing	Chevrolet
34	0	Ben Peterson	Wayne Peterson Racing	Toyota
Withdrew
35	36	Ryan Huff	Ryan Huff Motorsports	Ford
36	63	John Aramendia	Spraker Racing Enterprises	Chevrolet
Official starting lineup

== Race results ==
Fin	St	#	Driver	Team	Make	Laps	Led	Status	Pts
1	1	20	Jake Finch	Venturini Motorsports	Toyota	76	76	Running	49
2	5	15	Kris Wright	Venturini Motorsports	Toyota	76	0	Running	42
3	2	18	Tanner Gray	Joe Gibbs Racing	Toyota	76	0	Running	41
4	15	55	Gus Dean	Venturini Motorsports	Toyota	76	0	Running	40
5	6	32	Christian Rose	AM Racing	Ford	76	0	Running	39
6	23	8	Sean Corr	Empire Racing	Chevrolet	76	0	Running	38
7	24	22	Amber Balcaen	Venturini Motorsports	Toyota	76	0	Running	37
8	3	2	Andrés Pérez de Lara	Rev Racing	Chevrolet	76	0	Running	36
9	7	30	Frankie Muniz	Rette Jones Racing	Ford	76	0	Running	35
10	4	25	Toni Breidinger	Venturini Motorsports	Toyota	76	0	Running	34
11	21	35	Greg Van Alst	Greg Van Alst Motorsports	Chevrolet	76	0	Running	33
12	29	44	Thomas Annunziata	Jeff McClure Racing	Chevrolet	76	0	Running	32
13	25	93	Caleb Costner (R)	Costner Weaver Motorsports	Chevrolet	76	0	Running	31
14	17	69	Scott Melton	Kimmel Racing	Ford	75	0	Running	30
15	31	7	Eric Caudell	CCM Racing	Toyota	75	0	Running	29
16	32	27	Tim Richmond	Richmond Motorsports	Toyota	75	0	Running	28
17	20	01	Cody Dennison (R)	Fast Track Racing	Ford	75	0	Running	27
18	8	11	Bryce Haugeberg	Fast Track Racing	Toyota	74	0	Running	26
19	26	88	A. J. Moyer	Moyer-Petroniro Racing	Chevrolet	74	0	Running	25
20	11	12	Ryan Roulette	Fast Track Racing	Ford	74	0	Running	24
21	10	10	Ed Pompa	Fast Track Racing	Toyota	74	0	Running	23
22	9	99	Michael Maples (R)	Fast Track Racing	Chevrolet	73	0	Running	22
23	30	87	Chuck Buchanan Jr.	Charles Buchanan Racing	Chevrolet	73	0	Running	21
24	33	57	Hunter Deshautelle	Brother-In-Law Racing	Chevrolet	73	0	Running	20
25	12	03	Alex Clubb	Clubb Racing Inc.	Ford	72	0	Running	19
26	18	31	Casey Carden	Rise Motorsports	Chevrolet	71	0	Running	18
27	19	73	Andy Jankowiak	KLAS Motorsports	Ford	70	0	Fuel Pump	17
28	13	06	Con Nicolopoulos	Wayne Peterson Racing	Ford	70	0	Running	16
29	27	98	Dale Shearer	Shearer Speed Racing	Toyota	69	0	Running	15
30	14	48	Brad Smith	Brad Smith Motorsports	Ford	69	0	Running	14
31	16	6	Lavar Scott (R)	Rev Racing	Chevrolet	68	0	Running	13
32	28	68	Jeff Scofield	Kimmel Racing	Chevrolet	26	0	Radiator	12
33	22	97	Jason Kitzmiller	CR7 Motorsports	Chevrolet	8	0	Water Leak	11
34	34	0	Ben Peterson	Wayne Peterson Racing	Toyota	7	0	DNF	10
Withdrew
		36	Ryan Huff	Ryan Huff Motorsports	Ford				
		63	John Aramendia	Spraker Racing Enterprises	Chevrolet				
Official race results

== Standings after the race ==
Drivers' Championship standings

	Pos	Driver	Points
1	1	Christian Rose	107
1	2	Greg Van Alst	106 (-1)
	3	Andrés Pérez de Lara	104 (–3)
	4	Amber Balcaen	101 (–6)
4	5	Gus Dean	87 (–20)
20	6	Jake Finch	83 (–24)
14	7	Kris Wright	80 (–27)
5	8	Toni Breidinger	76 (–31)
4	9	Lavar Scott	76 (–31)
2	10	Thomas Annunziata	74 (–33)

- Note: Only the first 10 positions are included for the driver standings.

Previous race: 2024 General Tire 150 (Phoenix)	ARCA Menards Series; 2024 season	Next race: 2024 General Tire 150 (Dover)
