= 2024 General Tire 150 (Charlotte) =

6th race of the 2024 ARCA Menards Series

Race details
- Race 6 of 20 of the 2024 ARCA Menards Series
- Date: May 24, 2024
- Official name: 6th Annual General Tire 150
- Location: Charlotte Motor Speedway in Concord, North Carolina
- Course: Permanent racing facility
- Course length: 1.5 miles (2.4 km)
- Distance: 100 laps, 150 mi (241 km)
- Scheduled distance: 100 laps, 150 mi (241 km)
- Average speed: 103.409 mph (166.421 km/h)

Pole position
Driver	Andrés Pérez de Lara	Rev Racing
- Time: 30.340

Most laps led
Driver	Carson Kvapil	Pinnacle Racing Group
- Laps: 61

Winner
No. 18	Tanner Gray	Joe Gibbs Racing

Television in the United States
- Network: FS1
- Announcers: Jamie Little, Phil Parsons, and Trevor Bayne

Radio in the United States
- Radio: MRN

The 2024 General Tire 150 was the 6th stock car race of the 2024 ARCA Menards Series season, and the 6th iteration of the event. The race was held on Friday, May 24, 2024, at Charlotte Motor Speedway in Concord, North Carolina, a 1.5 mile (2.4 km) permanent asphalt tri-oval shaped intermediate speedway. The race took the scheduled 100 laps to complete. Tanner Gray, driving for Joe Gibbs Racing, would recover from a flat tire in the early stages of the race, and held off the field on worn tires to earn his first career ARCA Menards Series win. Carson Kvapil would dominate the majority of the race, leading a race-high 61 laps before finishing 2nd. To fill out the podium, pole-sitter Andrés Pérez de Lara, driving for Rev Racing, would finish 3rd, respectively.

== Report ==
=== Background ===
Charlotte Motor Speedway, the circuit where the race was held.

The race was held at Charlotte Motor Speedway, located in Concord, North Carolina. The speedway complex includes a 1.5-mile (2.4 km) quad-oval track that was utilized for the race, as well as a dragstrip and a dirt track. The speedway was built in 1959 by Bruton Smith and is considered the home track for NASCAR with many race teams based in the Charlotte metropolitan area. The track is owned and operated by Speedway Motorsports Inc. (SMI) with Marcus G. Smith serving as track president.

==== Entry list ====
- (R) denotes rookie driver.

#	Driver	Team	Make	Sponsor
2	Andrés Pérez de Lara	Rev Racing	Chevrolet	Max Siegel Inc.
03	Alex Clubb	Clubb Racing Inc.	Ford	Race Parts Liquidators
06	Con Nicolopoulos	Wayne Peterson Racing	Ford	Peterson Motorsports
6	Lavar Scott (R)	Rev Racing	Chevrolet	Max Siegel Inc.
9	Sebastian Arias	Rev Racing	Chevrolet	Brady IFS
10	Cody Dennison (R)	Fast Track Racing	Toyota	Timcast
11	Jayson Alexander	Fast Track Racing	Ford	Constant Contact
12	Ryan Roulette	Fast Track Racing	Ford	Bellator Recruiting Academy / VFW
15	Kris Wright	Venturini Motorsports	Toyota	FNB Corporation
18	Tanner Gray	Joe Gibbs Racing	Toyota	Place of Hope
20	Dean Thompson	Venturini Motorsports	Toyota	Thompson Pipe Group
22	Amber Balcaen	Venturini Motorsports	Toyota	ICON Direct
25	Toni Breidinger	Venturini Motorsports	Toyota	Celsius
27	Tim Richmond	Richmond Motorsports	Toyota	Immigration Law Center
28	Connor Mosack	Pinnacle Racing Group	Chevrolet	Chevrolet / Silver Hare Development
31	Mitch Gibson	Rise Motorsports	Chevrolet	C&S Construction & Cabinet Designs
32	Christian Rose	AM Racing	Ford	Blue Wolf Cleaners & Degreasers
33	Lawless Alan	Reaume Brothers Racing	Ford	AutoParkIt.com
35	Greg Van Alst	Greg Van Alst Motorsports	Ford	CB Fabricating
48	Brad Smith	Brad Smith Motorsports	Ford	Copraya.com
55	Gus Dean	Venturini Motorsports	Toyota	DRIVEN Trackside
57	Austin McDaniel	Brother-In-Law Racing	Chevrolet	O. B. Builders
69	Will Kimmel	Kimmel Racing	Ford	Weddington Custom Homes
73	Andy Jankowiak	KLAS Motorsports	Toyota	Acacia Energy
75	Hunter Deshautelle	Brother-In-Law Racing	Chevrolet	O. B. Builders
82	Carson Kvapil	Pinnacle Racing Group	Chevrolet	Chevrolet Performance
88	A. J. Moyer	Moyer-Petroniro Racing	Chevrolet	River's Edge Cottages & RV Park
93	Caleb Costner (R)	CW Motorsports	Chevrolet	C4 Foundation / Heritage Water Systems
97	Jason Kitzmiller	CR7 Motorsports	Chevrolet	A. L. L. Construction
99	Michael Maples (R)	Fast Track Racing	Chevrolet	Don Ray Petroleum LLC
Official entry list

== Practice ==
The first and only practice session was held on Friday, May 24, at 11:40 AM EST, and would last for 45 minutes. Tanner Gray, driving for Joe Gibbs Racing, would set the fastest time in the session, with a lap of 30.874, and a speed of 174.904 mph (281.481 km/h).

Pos.	#	Driver	Team	Make	Time	Speed
1	18	Tanner Gray	Joe Gibbs Racing	Toyota	30.874	174.904
2	6	Lavar Scott (R)	Rev Racing	Chevrolet	30.877	174.887
3	22	Amber Balcaen	Venturini Motorsports	Toyota	30.892	174.803
Full practice results

== Qualifying ==
Qualifying was held on Friday, May 24, at 12:40 PM EST. The qualifying system used is a multi-car, multi-lap based system. All drivers will be on track for a 20-minute timed session, and whoever sets the fastest time in that session will win the pole.

Andrés Pérez de Lara, driving for Rev Racing, would score the pole for the race, with a lap of 30.340, and a speed of 177.983 mph (286.436 km/h).

Two drivers withdrew from the race: Ryan Huff and Chuck Buchanan Jr..

=== Qualifying results ===
Pos.	#	Driver	Team	Make	Time	Speed
1	2	Andrés Pérez de Lara	Rev Racing	Chevrolet	30.340	177.983
2	55	Gus Dean	Venturini Motorsports	Toyota	30.342	177.971
3	18	Tanner Gray	Joe Gibbs Racing	Toyota	30.398	177.643
4	15	Kris Wright	Venturini Motorsports	Toyota	30.674	176.045
5	82	Carson Kvapil	Pinnacle Racing Group	Chevrolet	30.704	175.873
6	28	Connor Mosack	Pinnacle Racing Group	Chevrolet	30.788	175.393
7	6	Lavar Scott (R)	Rev Racing	Chevrolet	30.804	175.302
8	22	Amber Balcaen	Venturini Motorsports	Toyota	30.867	174.944
9	73	Andy Jankowiak	KLAS Motorsports	Toyota	31.033	174.008
10	69	Will Kimmel	Kimmel Racing	Ford	31.143	173.394
11	20	Dean Thompson	Venturini Motorsports	Toyota	31.232	172.900
12	25	Toni Breidinger	Venturini Motorsports	Toyota	31.398	171.985
13	35	Greg Van Alst	Greg Van Alst Motorsports	Ford	31.471	171.587
14	32	Christian Rose	AM Racing	Ford	31.560	171.103
15	97	Jason Kitzmiller	CR7 Motorsports	Chevrolet	31.638	170.681
16	10	Cody Dennison (R)	Fast Track Racing	Toyota	32.296	167.203
17	27	Tim Richmond	Richmond Motorsports	Toyota	32.338	166.986
18	9	Sebastian Arias	Rev Racing	Chevrolet	32.539	165.955
19	93	Caleb Costner (R)	CW Motorsports	Chevrolet	33.623	160.604
20	11	Jayson Alexander	Fast Track Racing	Ford	33.665	160.404
21	12	Ryan Roulette	Fast Track Racing	Ford	34.582	156.151
22	88	A. J. Moyer	Moyer-Petroniro Racing	Chevrolet	34.713	155.561
23	99	Michael Maples (R)	Fast Track Racing	Chevrolet	34.749	155.400
24	57	Austin McDaniel	Brother-In-Law Racing	Chevrolet	35.205	153.387
25	03	Alex Clubb	Clubb Racing Inc.	Ford	35.334	152.827
26	75	Hunter Deshautelle	Brother-In-Law Racing	Chevrolet	35.444	152.353
27	48	Brad Smith	Brad Smith Motorsports	Ford	37.834	142.729
28	31	Mitch Gibson	Rise Motorsports	Chevrolet	–	–
29	33	Lawless Alan	Reaume Brothers Racing	Ford	–	–
30	06	Con Nicolopoulos	Wayne Peterson Racing	Ford	–	–
Withdrew
31	36	Ryan Huff	Ryan Huff Motorsports	Ford		
32	87	Chuck Buchanan Jr.	Charles Buchanan Racing	Ford		
Official qualifying results

== Race results ==
Fin	St	#	Driver	Team	Make	Laps	Led	Status	Pts
1	3	18	Tanner Gray	Joe Gibbs Racing	Toyota	100	31	Running	47
2	5	82	Carson Kvapil	Pinnacle Racing Group	Chevrolet	100	61	Running	45
3	1	2	Andrés Pérez de Lara	Rev Racing	Chevrolet	100	8	Running	43
4	10	69	Will Kimmel	Kimmel Racing	Ford	100	0	Running	40
5	7	6	Lavar Scott (R)	Rev Racing	Chevrolet	100	0	Running	39
6	2	55	Gus Dean	Venturini Motorsports	Toyota	100	0	Running	38
7	11	20	Dean Thompson	Venturini Motorsports	Toyota	100	0	Running	37
8	29	33	Lawless Alan	Reaume Brothers Racing	Ford	100	0	Running	36
9	15	97	Jason Kitzmiller	CR7 Motorsports	Chevrolet	100	0	Running	35
10	18	9	Sebastian Arias	Rev Racing	Chevrolet	100	0	Running	34
11	13	35	Greg Van Alst	Greg Van Alst Motorsports	Ford	100	0	Running	33
12	12	25	Toni Breidinger	Venturini Motorsports	Toyota	100	0	Running	32
13	16	10	Cody Dennison (R)	Fast Track Racing	Toyota	100	0	Running	31
14	9	73	Andy Jankowiak	KLAS Motorsports	Toyota	100	0	Running	30
15	8	22	Amber Balcaen	Venturini Motorsports	Toyota	99	0	Running	29
16	21	12	Ryan Roulette	Fast Track Racing	Ford	98	0	Running	28
17	17	27	Tim Richmond	Richmond Motorsports	Toyota	98	0	Running	27
18	4	15	Kris Wright	Venturini Motorsports	Toyota	97	0	Running	26
19	22	88	A. J. Moyer	Moyer-Petroniro Racing	Chevrolet	96	0	Running	25
20	23	99	Michael Maples (R)	Fast Track Racing	Chevrolet	94	0	Running	24
21	24	57	Austin McDaniel	Brother-In-Law Racing	Chevrolet	90	0	Running	23
22	30	06	Con Nicolopoulos	Wayne Peterson Racing	Ford	89	0	Running	22
23	26	75	Hunter Deshautelle	Brother-In-Law Racing	Chevrolet	87	0	Running	21
24	28	31	Mitch Gibson	Rise Motorsports	Chevrolet	79	0	Accident	20
25	25	03	Alex Clubb	Clubb Racing Inc.	Ford	45	0	Running	19
26	27	48	Brad Smith	Brad Smith Motorsports	Ford	36	0	Too Slow	18
27	6	28	Connor Mosack	Pinnacle Racing Group	Chevrolet	30	0	Brakes	17
28	14	32	Christian Rose	AM Racing	Ford	28	0	DNF	16
29	20	11	Jayson Alexander	Fast Track Racing	Ford	20	0	Accident	15
Did not start
30	19	93	Caleb Costner (R)	CW Motorsports	Chevrolet				
Official race results

== Standings after the race ==
Drivers' Championship standings

	Pos	Driver	Points
	1	Andrés Pérez de Lara	273
	2	Greg Van Alst	257 (-16)
	3	Amber Balcaen	240 (–33)
2	4	Lavar Scott	236 (–37)
	5	Kris Wright	234 (–39)
2	6	Christian Rose	226 (–47)
	7	Andy Jankowiak	223 (–50)
	8	Toni Breidinger	221 (–52)
1	9	Michael Maples	189 (–84)
1	10	Alex Clubb	184 (–89)

- Note: Only the first 10 positions are included for the driver standings.

Previous race: 2024 Tide 150	ARCA Menards Series; 2024 season	Next race: 2024 Atlas 150
