= 2023 BRANDT 200 =

Race details
- Race 1 of 20 of the 2023 ARCA Menards Series
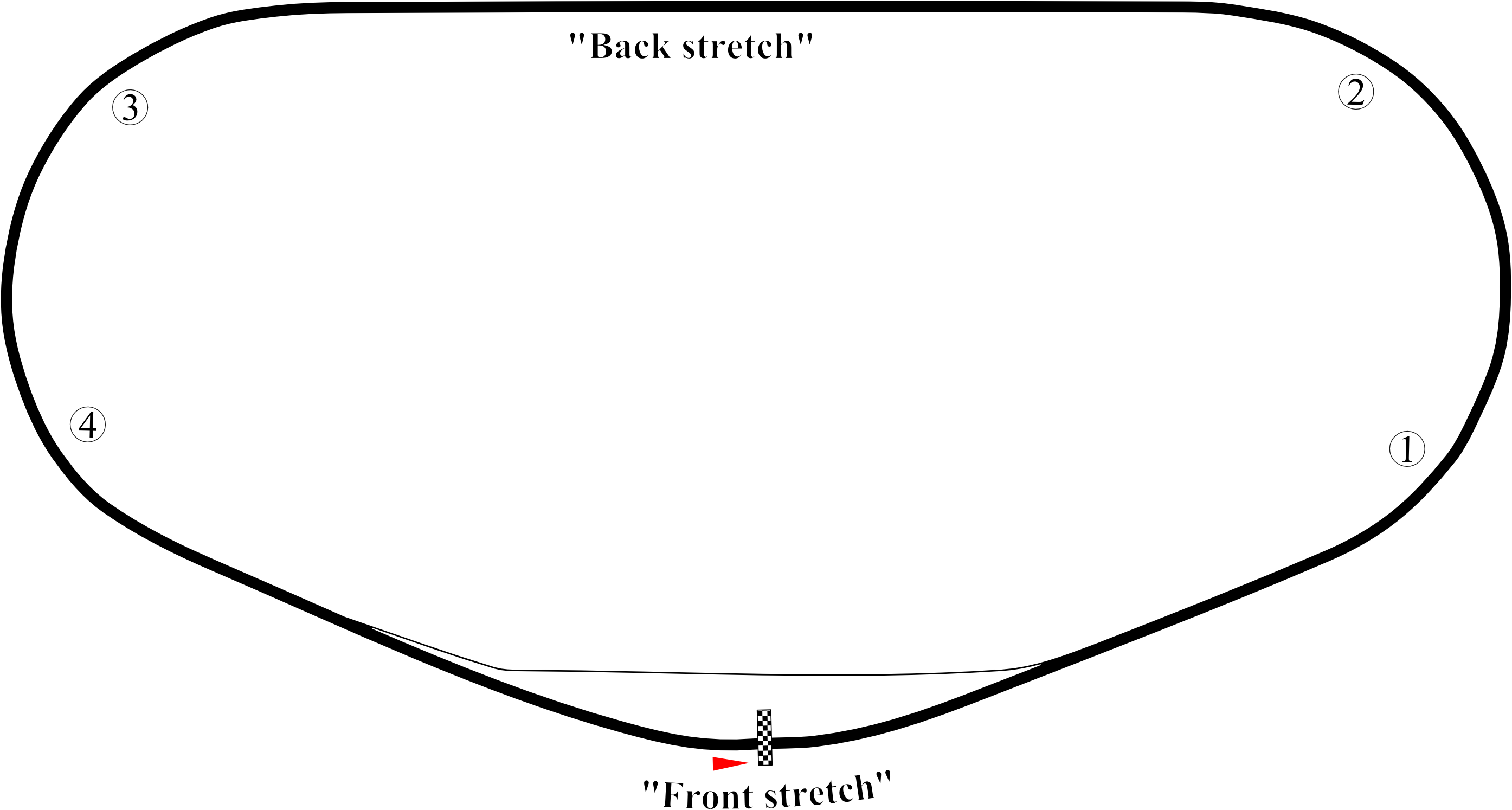
- Date: February 18, 2023
- Official name: 60th Annual BRANDT 200
- Location: Daytona International Speedway, Daytona Beach, Florida
- Course: Permanent racing facility
- Course length: 2.5 miles (4 km)
- Distance: 80 laps, 200 mi (321 km)
- Scheduled distance: 80 laps, 200 mi (321 km)
- Average speed: 103.019 mph (165.793 km/h)

Pole position
Driver	Connor Mosack	Joe Gibbs Racing
- Time: 49.396

Most laps led
Driver	Connor Mosack	Joe Gibbs Racing
- Laps: 25

Winner
No. 35	Greg Van Alst	Greg Van Alst Motorsports

Television in the United States
- Network: FS1
- Announcers: Jamie Little, Phil Parsons, and Austin Cindric

Radio in the United States
- Radio: MRN

The 2023 BRANDT 200 was the first stock car race of the 2023 ARCA Menards Series season, and was the 60th running of the event. The race was held on Saturday, February 18, 2023, in Daytona Beach, Florida at Daytona International Speedway, a 2.5 mile (4 km) permanent tri-oval shaped asphalt superspeedway. The race was contested over 80 laps. In a chaotic race that brought several cautions, Greg Van Alst, driving for his own team, Greg Van Alst Motorsports, would win the race after making a last lap pass on Jason White for the lead. This was Alst's first career ARCA Menards Series win. To fill out the podium, Connor Mosack, driving for Joe Gibbs Racing, and Sean Corr, driving for Empire Racing, would finish 2nd and 3rd respectively.

This race was known as the stock car debut for Frankie Muniz, the actor known for starring in the FOX sitcom Malcolm in the Middle. This was his first start as part of his full-time season with Rette Jones Racing.

== Background ==
Daytona International Speedway is one of three superspeedways to hold NASCAR races, the other two being Indianapolis Motor Speedway and Talladega Superspeedway. The standard track at Daytona International Speedway is a four-turn superspeedway that is 2.5 miles (4.0 km) long. The track's turns are banked at 31 degrees, while the front stretch, the location of the finish line, is banked at 18 degrees.

=== Entry list ===
- (R) denotes rookie driver.

#	Driver	Team	Make	Sponsor
01	Andrés Pérez de Lara (R)	Fast Track Racing	Chevrolet	Fast Track Racing
02	Miguel Gomes	Young's Motorsports	Chevrolet	Simthunder
2	Lavar Scott	Rev Racing	Chevrolet	Max Siegel Inc.
03	Brayton Laster	Mullins Racing	Ford	Indy Auto Recyclers
3	Willie Mullins	Mullins Racing	Chevrolet	CorvetteParts.net, Crow Wing Recycling
4	Dale Quarterley	1/4 Ley Racing	Chevrolet	Van Dyk Recycling Solutions
06	A. J. Moyer	Wayne Peterson Racing	Chevrolet	River's Edge Cottages & RV Park
6	Jack Wood	Rev Racing	Chevrolet	Velocity Racing, Max Siegel Inc.
7	Eric Caudell	CCM Racing	Toyota	Coble Enterprises, Red Tide Canopies
8	Sean Corr	Empire Racing	Chevrolet	The Trans Group
10	Ed Pompa	Fast Track Racing	Chevrolet	HYTORC of New York, Double "H" Ranch
11	Bryce Haugeberg	Fast Track Racing	Toyota	Magnum Contracting, Haugeberg Farms
12	Zach Herrin	Fast Track Racing	Toyota	Lambda Legal
15	Amber Balcaen	Venturini Motorsports	Toyota	ICON Direct
18	Connor Mosack	Joe Gibbs Racing	Toyota	Mobil 1
20	Jesse Love	Venturini Motorsports	Toyota	Yahoo!
25	Gus Dean	Venturini Motorsports	Toyota	JBL, Dean Custom Air
27	Tim Richmond	Richmond Motorsports	Toyota	Latino Immigration & Legal Center
30	Frankie Muniz (R)	Rette Jones Racing	Ford	HairClub
32	Christian Rose (R)	AM Racing	Ford	West Virginia Tourism
35	Greg Van Alst	Greg Van Alst Motorsports	Chevrolet	Vern's Concrete, CB Fabricating
36	Ryan Huff	Huff Racing	Ford	Southeastern Services
42	Robby Lyons	Cook Racing Technologies	Chevrolet	Sunwest Construction, MMI Services
44	Jason White	Jeff McClure Racing	Chevrolet	Powder Ventures Excavations
45	Tony Cosentino	Tamayo Cosentino Racing	Chevrolet	Tamayo Sports Florida
48	Brad Smith	Brad Smith Motorsports	Chevrolet	Copraya.com
53	Natalie Decker	Emerling-Gase Motorsports	Ford	Splat
55	Toni Breidinger	Venturini Motorsports	Toyota	FP Movement
57	Hunter Deshautelle	Brother-in-Law Motorsports	Chevrolet	O. B. Builders
62	Steve Lewis Jr.	Steve Lewis Racing	Chevrolet	Telco Construction, Jeffery Machine
63	Logan Misuraca	Spraker Racing Enterprises	Chevrolet	Celsius Holdings
66	Jon Garrett (R)	Veer Motorsports	Chevrolet	The Camping Crew
68	Gage Rodgers	Kimmel Racing	Ford	SEKISUI Voltek
69	Scott Melton	Kimmel Racing	Ford	Melton-McFadden Insurance Agency
73	Andy Jankowiak	KLAS Motorsports	Ford	Whelen
74	Mandy Chick (R)	Team Chick Motorsports	Chevrolet	Rose–Hulman Institute of Technology
75	Bryan Dauzat	Brother-in-Law Motorsports	Chevrolet	O. B. Builders
82	Kevin Campbell	KC Motorsports	Chevrolet	Missouri Tigers
87	Chuck Buchanan Jr.	Charles Buchanan Racing	Chevrolet	Spring Drug Pharmacy
93	Caleb Costner	Costner Weaver Motorsports	Chevrolet	Innovative Tiny Houses, Lickety Lew's
97	Jason Kitzmiller	CR7 Motorsports	Chevrolet	A. L. L. Construction
Official entry list

== Practice ==
The first and only practice session was held on Thursday, February 16, at 4:05 PM EST, and would last for 50 minutes. Frankie Muniz, driving for Rette Jones Racing, would set the fastest time in the session, with a lap of 49.393, and an average speed of 182.212 mph (293.242 km/h).

Pos.	#	Driver	Team	Make	Time	Speed
1	30	Frankie Muniz (R)	Rette Jones Racing	Ford	49.393	182.212
2	18	Connor Mosack	Joe Gibbs Racing	Toyota	49.403	182.175
3	2	Lavar Scott	Rev Racing	Chevrolet	49.404	182.171
Full practice results

== Qualifying ==
Qualifying was held on Friday, February 17, at 1:30 PM EST. For qualifying, drivers were split into six different groups. The driver who sets the overall fastest lap will win the pole. Connor Mosack, driving for Joe Gibbs Racing, would score the pole for the race, with a lap of 49.396, and an average speed of 182.201 mph (293.224 km/h).

Pos.	#	Driver	Team	Make	Time	Speed
1	18	Connor Mosack	Joe Gibbs Racing	Toyota	49.396	182.201
2	20	Jesse Love	Venturini Motorsports	Toyota	49.419	182.116
3	97	Jason Kitzmiller	CR7 Motorsports	Chevrolet	49.448	182.009
4	36	Ryan Huff	Huff Racing	Ford	49.463	181.954
5	73	Andy Jankowiak	KLAS Motorsports	Ford	49.492	181.848
6	42	Robby Lyons	Cook Racing Technologies	Chevrolet	49.565	181.580
7	35	Greg Van Alst	Greg Van Alst Motorsports	Chevrolet	49.598	181.459
8	69	Scott Melton	Kimmel Racing	Ford	49.599	181.455
9	63	Logan Misuraca	Spraker Racing Enterprises	Chevrolet	49.616	181.393
10	25	Gus Dean	Venturini Motorsports	Toyota	49.618	181.386
11	2	Lavar Scott	Rev Racing	Chevrolet	49.735	180.959
12	55	Toni Breidinger	Venturini Motorsports	Toyota	49.737	180.952
13	32	Christian Rose (R)	AM Racing	Ford	49.747	180.915
14	11	Bryce Haugeberg	Fast Track Racing	Toyota	49.760	180.868
15	4	Dale Quarterley	1/4 Ley Racing	Chevrolet	49.764	180.854
16	30	Frankie Muniz (R)	Rette Jones Racing	Ford	49.807	180.697
17	53	Natalie Decker	Emerling-Gase Motorsports	Ford	49.910	180.325
18	27	Tim Richmond	Richmond Motorsports	Toyota	49.917	180.299
19	44	Jason White	Jeff McClure Racing	Chevrolet	50.295	178.944
20	03	Brayton Laster	Mullins Racing	Ford	50.469	178.327
21	3	Willie Mullins	Mullins Racing	Chevrolet	50.524	178.133
22	57	Hunter Deshautelle	Brother-in-Law Motorsports	Chevrolet	50.802	177.158
23	66	Jon Garrett (R)	Veer Motorsports	Chevrolet	50.946	176.658
24	62	Steve Lewis Jr.	Steve Lewis Racing	Chevrolet	50.951	176.640
25	74	Mandy Chick (R)	Team Chick Motorsports	Chevrolet	51.079	176.198
26	7	Eric Caudell	CCM Racing	Toyota	51.087	176.170
27	75	Bryan Dauzat	Brother-in-Law Motorsports	Chevrolet	51.092	176.153
28	45	Tony Cosentino	Tamayo Cosentino Racing	Chevrolet	51.095	176.142
29	87	Chuck Buchanan Jr.	Charles Buchanan Racing	Chevrolet	51.097	176.136
30	10	Ed Pompa	Fast Track Racing	Chevrolet	51.503	174.747
31	12	Zach Herrin	Fast Track Racing	Toyota	51.926	173.324
32	06	A. J. Moyer	Wayne Peterson Racing	Chevrolet	54.926	165.365
33	48	Brad Smith	Brad Smith Motorsports	Chevrolet	55.187	163.082
34	93	Caleb Costner	Costner Weaver Motorsports	Chevrolet	56.500	159.292
35	15	Amber Balcaen	Venturini Motorsports	Toyota	–	–
36	6	Jack Wood	Rev Racing	Chevrolet	–	–
37	68	Gage Rodgers	Kimmel Racing	Ford	–	–
38	02	Miguel Gomes	Young's Motorsports	Chevrolet	–	–
39	8	Sean Corr	Empire Racing	Chevrolet	–	–
40	01	Andrés Pérez de Lara (R)	Fast Track Racing	Chevrolet	–	–
Withdrew
41	82	Kevin Campbell	KC Motorsports	Chevrolet	–	–
Official qualifying results

== Race results ==
Fin	St	#	Driver	Team	Make	Laps	Led	Status	Pts
1	7	35	Greg Van Alst	Greg Van Alst Motorsports	Chevrolet	80	6	Running	47
2	1	18	Connor Mosack	Joe Gibbs Racing	Toyota	80	25	Running	45
3	39	8	Sean Corr	Empire Racing	Chevrolet	80	5	Running	42
4	11	2	Lavar Scott	Rev Racing	Chevrolet	80	14	Running	41
5	25	74	Mandy Chick (R)	Team Chick Motorsports	Chevrolet	80	0	Running	39
6	35	15	Amber Balcaen	Venturini Motorsports	Toyota	80	0	Running	38
7	2	20	Jesse Love	Venturini Motorsports	Toyota	80	0	Running	37
8	36	6	Jack Wood	Rev Racing	Chevrolet	80	0	Running	36
9	19	44	Jason White	Jeff McClure Racing	Chevrolet	80	14	Running	36
10	15	4	Dale Quarterley	1/4 Ley Racing	Chevrolet	80	0	Running	34
11	16	30	Frankie Muniz (R)	Rette Jones Racing	Ford	80	0	Running	33
12	13	32	Christian Rose (R)	AM Racing	Ford	80	2	Running	33
13	24	62	Steve Lewis Jr.	Steve Lewis Racing	Chevrolet	80	0	Running	31
14	17	53	Natalie Decker	Emerling-Gase Motorsports	Ford	80	0	Running	30
15	28	45	Tony Cosentino	Tamayo Cosentino Racing	Chevrolet	80	0	Running	29
16	14	11	Bryce Haugeberg	Fast Track Racing	Toyota	80	0	Running	28
17	6	42	Robby Lyons	Cook Racing Technologies	Chevrolet	80	0	Running	27
18	9	63	Logan Misuraca	Spraker Racing Enterprises	Chevrolet	80	0	Running	26
19	3	97	Jason Kitzmiller	CR7 Motorsports	Chevrolet	80	14	Running	26
20	21	3	Willie Mullins	Mullins Racing	Chevrolet	80	0	Running	24
21	27	75	Bryan Dauzat	Brother-in-Law Motorsports	Chevrolet	80	0	Running	23
22	30	10	Ed Pompa	Fast Track Racing	Chevrolet	80	0	Running	22
23	12	55	Toni Breidinger	Venturini Motorsports	Toyota	80	0	Running	21
24	34	93	Caleb Costner	Costner Weaver Motorsports	Chevrolet	80	0	Running	20
25	23	66	Jon Garrett (R)	Veer Motorsports	Chevrolet	80	0	Running	19
26	37	68	Gage Rodgers	Kimmel Racing	Ford	80	0	Running	18
27	20	03	Brayton Laster	Mullins Racing	Ford	80	0	Running	17
28	29	87	Chuck Buchanan Jr.	Charles Buchanan Racing	Chevrolet	80	0	Running	16
29	32	06	A. J. Moyer	Wayne Peterson Racing	Chevrolet	79	0	Running	15
30	33	48	Brad Smith	Brad Smith Motorsports	Chevrolet	74	0	Running	14
31	38	02	Miguel Gomes	Young's Motorsports	Chevrolet	69	0	Vibration	13
32	5	73	Andy Jankowiak	KLAS Motorsports	Ford	62	0	Accident	12
33	31	12	Zach Herrin	Fast Track Racing	Toyota	62	0	Running	11
34	26	7	Eric Caudell	CCM Racing	Toyota	43	0	Engine	10
35	10	25	Gus Dean	Venturini Motorsports	Toyota	33	0	Fuel Line	9
36	18	27	Tim Richmond	Richmond Motorsports	Toyota	30	0	Accident	8
37	4	36	Ryan Huff	Huff Racing	Ford	16	0	Clutch	7
38	8	69	Scott Melton	Kimmel Racing	Ford	11	0	Accident	6
39	22	57	Hunter Deshautelle	Brother-in-Law Motorsports	Chevrolet	3	0	Radiator	5
40	40	01	Andrés Pérez de Lara (R)	Fast Track Racing	Chevrolet	0	0	Did Not Start	3
Withdrew
		82	Kevin Campbell	KC Motorsports	Chevrolet				
Official race results

== Standings after the race ==
Drivers' Championship standings

Pos	Driver	Points
1	Greg Van Alst	47
2	Connor Mosack	45 (-2)
3	Sean Corr	42 (-5)
4	Lavar Scott	41 (-6)
5	Mandy Chick	39 (-8)
6	Amber Balcaen	38 (-9)
7	Jesse Love	37 (-10)
8	Jack Wood	36 (-11)
9	Jason White	36 (-11)
10	Dale Quarterley	34 (-13)

- Note: Only the first 10 positions are included for the driver standings.

Previous race: 2022 Shore Lunch 200	ARCA Menards Series; 2023 season	Next race: 2023 General Tire 150 (Phoenix)
