= 2022 General Tire 150 (Charlotte) =

Fifth race of the 2022 ARCA Menards Series

Race details
- Race 5 of 20 of the 2022 ARCA Menards Series
- Date: May 27, 2022
- Official name: 12th Annual General Tire 150
- Location: Charlotte Motor Speedway, Concord, North Carolina, United States
- Course: Permanent racing facility
- Course length: 1.5 miles (2.4 km)
- Distance: 100 laps, 150 mi (241.4 km)
- Scheduled distance: 100 laps, 150 mi (241.4 km)

Pole position
Driver	Brandon Jones	Joe Gibbs Racing
- Time: 30.829

Most laps led
Driver	Brandon Jones	Joe Gibbs Racing
- Laps: 33

Winner
No. 81	Brandon Jones	Joe Gibbs Racing

Television in the United States
- Network: Fox Sports 1
- Announcers: Jamie Little, Corey LaJoie, Phil Parsons

Radio in the United States
- Radio: Motor Racing Network

The 2022 General Tire 150 was the fifth stock car race of the 2022 ARCA Menards Series season, and the 12th iteration of the event. The race was held on Friday, May 27, 2022, in Concord, North Carolina, United States at Charlotte Motor Speedway, a 1.5 mile (2.4 km) permanent oval-shaped racetrack. The race was contested over 100 laps. At race's end, Brandon Jones, driving for Joe Gibbs Racing, dominated during the end of the race, and earned his 6th career ARCA Menards Series win, and his first of the season. To fill out the podium, Corey Heim of Venturini Motorsports and Rajah Caruth of Rev Racing would finish second and third, respectively.

== Background ==
Charlotte Motor Speedway is a motorsport complex located in Concord, North Carolina, 13 mi (21 km) outside Charlotte. The complex features a 1.5 mi (2.4 km) quad oval track that hosts NASCAR racing including the prestigious Coca-Cola 600 on Memorial Day weekend, and the Bank of America Roval 400. The speedway was built in 1959 by Bruton Smith and is considered the home track for NASCAR with many race teams located in the Charlotte area. The track is owned and operated by Speedway Motorsports with Greg Walter as track president.

The 2,000 acres (810 ha) complex also features a state-of-the-art 0.25 mi (0.40 km) drag racing strip, ZMAX Dragway. It is the only all-concrete, four-lane drag strip in the United States and hosts NHRA events. Alongside the drag strip is a state-of-the-art clay oval that hosts dirt racing including the World of Outlaws finals among other popular racing events.

=== Entry list ===
- (R) denotes rookie driver

#	Driver	Team	Make	Sponsor
01	Dick Doheny	Fast Track Racing	Toyota	Fast Track Racing
2	Nick Sanchez	Rev Racing	Chevrolet	Max Siegel Inc.
03	Josh White	Clubb Racing Inc.	Ford	Kanawha
06	Zachary Tinkle	Wayne Peterson Racing	Chevrolet	GreatRailing.com
6	Rajah Caruth (R)	Rev Racing	Chevrolet	Winston-Salem State University
7	Matt Wilson	CCM Racing	Toyota	R. A. Wilson Enterprises
8	Sean Corr	Empire Racing	Chevrolet	The Trans Group
10	Ryan Huff	Fast Track Racing	Ford	Southeastern Services, H&H Excavation
11	Tony Cosentino	Fast Track Racing	Toyota	The Gutter Team
12	Tommy Vigh Jr.	Fast Track Racing	Chevrolet	Aaron Kyle Singer-Songwriter
15	Parker Chase	Venturini Motorsports	Toyota	Vertical Bridge
18	Drew Dollar	Kyle Busch Motorsports	Toyota	Lynx Capital
20	Corey Heim	Venturini Motorsports	Toyota	Crescent Tools
23	Connor Mosack	Bret Holmes Racing	Chevrolet	Nic Tailor Custom Underwear
25	Toni Breidinger (R)	Venturini Motorsports	Toyota	FP Pavement
27	Tim Richmond	Richmond Motorsports	Chevrolet	Circle Track Warehouse
30	Amber Balcaen (R)	Rette Jones Racing	Ford	ICON Direct
35	Greg Van Alst	Greg Van Alst Motorsports	Ford	CB Fabricating
36	Tim Monroe	Huff Racing	Ford	Fort Worth Screen Printing
42	Christian Rose	Cook Racing Technologies	Chevrolet	West Virginia Tourism
43	Daniel Dye (R)	GMS Racing	Chevrolet	Carolina Custom
48	Brad Smith	Brad Smith Motorsports	Chevrolet	PSST...Copraya Websites
57	Bryan Dauzat	Brother-In-Law Racing	Chevrolet	Brother In Law Motorsports
69	Will Kimmel	Kimmel Racing	Toyota	Melton McFadden Insurance, Donna’s Donuts
73	Andy Jankowiak	Jankowiak Motorsports	Ford	V-1 Fiber
81	Brandon Jones	Joe Gibbs Racing	Toyota	Tide, Bounty, Menards
Official entry list

== Practice/Qualifying ==
Practice and qualifying will both be combined into one 45-minute session, with a driver's fastest time counting as their qualifying lap. It is scheduled to held on Friday, May 27, at 12:00 PM EST.

Brandon Jones of Joe Gibbs Racing scored the pole for the race, with a time of 30.829 seconds, and a speed of 175.160 mph (281.893 km/h).

Pos.	#	Driver	Team	Make	Time	Speed
1	81	Brandon Jones	Joe Gibbs Racing	Toyota	30.829	175.160
2	18	Drew Dollar	Kyle Busch Motorsports	Toyota	30.881	174.865
3	43	Daniel Dye (R)	GMS Racing	Chevrolet	30.941	174.526
4	6	Rajah Caruth (R)	Rev Racing	Chevrolet	31.150	173.355
5	23	Connor Mosack	Bret Holmes Racing	Chevrolet	31.186	173.155
6	15	Parker Chase	Venturini Motorsports	Toyota	31.219	172.972
7	2	Nick Sanchez	Rev Racing	Chevrolet	31.388	172.040
8	20	Corey Heim	Venturini Motorsports	Toyota	31.414	171.898
9	69	Will Kimmel	Kimmel Racing	Toyota	31.523	171.303
10	35	Greg Van Alst	Greg Van Alst Motorsports	Ford	31.624	170.756
11	73	Andy Jankowiak	Jankowiak Motorsports	Ford	31.889	169.337
12	11	Tony Cosentino	Fast Track Racing	Toyota	32.616	165.563
13	10	Ryan Huff	Fast Track Racing	Ford	32.693	165.173
14	30	Amber Balcaen (R)	Rette Jones Racing	Ford	32.961	163.830
15	7	Matt Wilson	CCM Racing	Toyota	32.988	163.696
16	8	Sean Corr	Empire Racing	Chevrolet	33.018	163.547
17	42	Christian Rose	Cook Racing Technologies	Chevrolet	33.108	163.103
18	25	Toni Breidinger (R)	Venturini Motorsports	Toyota	33.317	162.079
19	06	Zachary Tinkle	Wayne Peterson Racing	Chevrolet	33.519	161.103
20	57	Bryan Dauzat	Brother-in-Law Racing	Chevrolet	33.871	159.428
21	12	Tommy Vigh Jr.	Fast Track Racing	Chevrolet	36.057	149.763
22	36	Tim Monroe	Huff Racing	Ford	36.296	148.777
23	01	Dick Doheny	Fast Track Racing	Toyota	36.817	146.671
24	03	Josh White	Clubb Racing Inc.	Ford	37.022	145.859
25	48	Brad Smith	Brad Smith Motorsports	Chevrolet	39.693	136.044
26	27	Tim Richmond	Richmond Motorsports	Chevrolet	-	-
Official practice/qualifying results

== Race results ==
Fin.	St.	#	Driver	Team	Make	Laps	Led	Status	Pts
1	1	81	Brandon Jones	Joe Gibbs Racing	Toyota	100	33	Running	48
2	8	20	Corey Heim	Venturini Motorsports	Toyota	100	15	Running	43
3	4	6	Rajah Caruth (R)	Rev Racing	Chevrolet	100	27	Running	42
4	5	23	Connor Mosack	Bret Holmes Racing	Chevrolet	100	6	Running	41
5	10	35	Greg Van Alst	Greg Van Alst Motorsports	Ford	100	0	Running	39
6	3	43	Daniel Dye (R)	GMS Racing	Chevrolet	99	0	Running	38
7	14	30	Amber Balcaen (R)	Rette Jones Racing	Ford	99	0	Running	37
8	7	2	Nick Sanchez	Rev Racing	Chevrolet	98	19	Running	38
9	12	11	Tony Cosentino	Fast Track Racing	Toyota	98	0	Running	35
10	16	8	Sean Corr	Empire Racing	Chevrolet	98	0	Running	34
11	18	25	Toni Breidinger (R)	Venturini Motorsports	Toyota	96	0	Running	33
12	14	7	Matt Wilson	CCM Racing	Toyota	95	0	Running	32
13	13	10	Ryan Huff	Fast Track Racing	Ford	95	0	Running	31
14	25	48	Brad Smith	Brad Smith Motorsports	Chevrolet	93	0	Running	30
15	6	15	Parker Chase	Venturini Motorsports	Toyota	92	0	Running	29
16	17	42	Christian Rose	Cook Racing Technologies	Chevrolet	66	0	Engine	28
17	19	06	Zachary Tinkle	Wayne Peterson Racing	Chevrolet	49	0	Transmission	27
18	11	73	Andy Jankowiak	Jankowiak Motorsports	Ford	44	0	Accident	26
19	9	69	Will Kimmel	Kimmel Racing	Toyota	31	0	Accident	25
20	20	57	Bryan Dauzat	Brother-in-Law Racing	Chevrolet	23	0	Accident	24
21	21	12	Tommy Vigh Jr.	Fast Track Racing	Chevrolet	17	0	Brakes	23
22	23	01	Dick Doheny	Fast Track Racing	Toyota	16	0	Carburetor	22
23	22	36	Tim Monroe	Huff Racing	Ford	13	0	Transmission	21
24	2	18	Drew Dollar	Kyle Busch Motorsports	Toyota	4	0	Accident	20
25	24	03	Josh White	Clubb Racing Inc.	Ford	3	0	Accident	19
26	26	27	Tim Richmond	Richmond Motorsports	Chevrolet	0	0	Did Not Start	18
Official race results

== Standings after the race ==
Drivers' Championship standings

	Pos	Driver	Points
1	1	Rajah Caruth	247
1	2	Nick Sanchez	242 (-5)
	3	Daniel Dye	240 (-7)
1	4	Toni Breidinger	201 (-46)
2	5	Amber Balcaen	196 (-51)
5	6	Greg Van Alst	189 (-58)
6	7	Zachary Tinkle	169 (-78)
4	8	Corey Heim	165 (-82)
2	9	Brad Smith	154 (-93)
	10	Ryan Huff	131 (-116)

- Note: Only the first 10 positions are included for the driver standings.

Previous race: 2022 Dutch Boy 150	ARCA Menards Series; 2022 season	Next race: 2022 Calypso Lemonade 150
