= 2024 Tide 150 =

5th race of the 2024 ARCA Menards Series

Race details
- Race 5 of 20 of the 2024 ARCA Menards Series
- Date: May 4, 2024
- Official name: 5th Annual Tide 150
- Location: Kansas Speedway in Kansas City, Kansas
- Course: Permanent racing facility
- Course length: 1.5 miles (2.4 km)
- Distance: 100 laps, 150 mi (241 km)
- Scheduled distance: 100 laps, 150 mi (241 km)
- Average speed: 119.443 mph (192.225 km/h)

Pole position
Driver	Tanner Gray	Joe Gibbs Racing
- Time: 30.723

Most laps led
Driver	Tanner Gray	Joe Gibbs Racing
- Laps: 86

Winner
No. 28	Connor Mosack	Pinnacle Racing Group

Television in the United States
- Network: FS1
- Announcers: Jamie Little, Phil Parsons, and Trevor Bayne

Radio in the United States
- Radio: MRN

The 2024 Tide 150 was the 5th stock car race of the 2024 ARCA Menards Series season, and the 5th iteration of the event. The race was held on Saturday, May 4, 2024, at Kansas Speedway in Kansas City, Kansas, a 1.5 mile (2.4 km) permanent asphalt quad-oval shaped intermediate speedway. The race took the scheduled 100 laps to complete. Connor Mosack, driving for Pinnacle Racing Group, would make a late race pass on Tanner Gray for the lead in the final stages of the race, and led the final 12 laps to earn his second career ARCA Menards Series win, and his first of the season. Gray, who started on the pole, had dominated the majority of the race, leading a race-high 86 laps before being passed and finishing 2nd. To fill out the podium, Dean Thompson, driving for Venturini Motorsports, would finish in 3rd, respectively.

== Report ==
=== Background ===
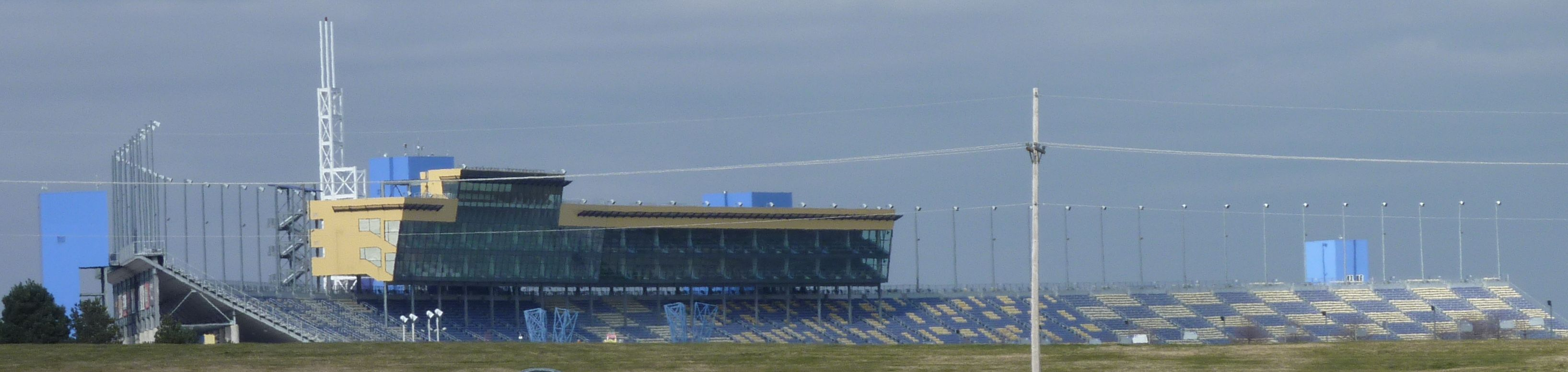
The layout of Kansas Speedway, the circuit where the race was held.

Kansas Speedway is a 1.5-mile (2.4 km) tri-oval race track in Kansas City, Kansas. It was built in 2001 and hosts two annual NASCAR race weekends. The NTT IndyCar Series also raced there until 2011. The speedway is owned and operated by the International Speedway Corporation.

==== Entry list ====
- (R) denotes rookie driver.

#	Driver	Team	Make	Sponsor
2	Andrés Pérez de Lara	Rev Racing	Chevrolet	Max Siegel Inc.
03	Alex Clubb	Clubb Racing Inc.	Ford	Race Parts Liquidators
06	Kevin Hinckle	Wayne Peterson Racing	Ford	KH Automotive
6	Lavar Scott (R)	Rev Racing	Chevrolet	Max Siegel Inc.
10	Ryan Huff	Fast Track Racing	Ford	Williamsburg Contracting / Shenco
11	Cody Dennison (R)	Fast Track Racing	Ford	Timcast
12	Ryan Roulette	Fast Track Racing	Ford	Bellator Recruiting Academy / VFW
15	Kris Wright	Venturini Motorsports	Toyota	FNB Corporation
17	Marco Andretti	Cook Racing Technologies	Chevrolet	Group 1001 / MMI
18	Tanner Gray	Joe Gibbs Racing	Toyota	Place of Hope
20	Jake Finch	Venturini Motorsports	Toyota	Phoenix Construction
22	Amber Balcaen	Venturini Motorsports	Toyota	ICON Direct
25	Toni Breidinger	Venturini Motorsports	Toyota	Venturini Motorsports
28	Connor Mosack	Pinnacle Racing Group	Chevrolet	Chevrolet Performance
31	Brayton Laster	Rise Motorsports	Chevrolet	@Cyber_Fox_ on X / CarAggio.com
32	Christian Rose	AM Racing	Ford	West Virginia Department of Tourism
33	Lawless Alan	Reaume Brothers Racing	Ford	AutoParkIt.com
35	Greg Van Alst	Greg Van Alst Motorsports	Ford	CB Fabricating
42	Tanner Reif	Cook Racing Technologies	Toyota	Vegas Fastener Manufacturing
48	Brad Smith	Brad Smith Motorsports	Ford	Copraya.com
55	Dean Thompson	Venturini Motorsports	Toyota	Thompson Pipe Group
73	Andy Jankowiak	KLAS Motorsports	Toyota	Dak's Market
74	Mandy Chick	Team Chick Motorsports	Chevrolet	Dynamic Drivelines / FK Rod Ends
99	Michael Maples (R)	Fast Track Racing	Chevrolet	Don Ray Petroleum LLC
Official entry list

== Optional Practice ==
An optional pre-race practice session was held on Friday, May 3, at 9:00 AM CST, and would last for 5 hours. Tanner Gray, driving for Joe Gibbs Racing, would set the fastest time in the session, with a lap of 30.879, and a speed of 174.876 mph (281.436 km/h).

Pos.	#	Driver	Team	Make	Time	Speed
1	18	Tanner Gray	Joe Gibbs Racing	Toyota	30.879	174.876
2	55	Dean Thompson	Venturini Motorsports	Toyota	30.887	174.831
3	15	Kris Wright	Venturini Motorsports	Toyota	30.905	174.729

== Practice ==
The official final practice session was held on Saturday, May 4, at 9:25 AM CST, and would last for 30 minutes. Tanner Gray, driving for Joe Gibbs Racing, would set the fastest time in the session, with a lap of 30.723, and a speed of 175.764 mph (282.865 km/h).

Pos.	#	Driver	Team	Make	Time	Speed
1	18	Tanner Gray	Joe Gibbs Racing	Toyota	30.723	175.764
2	20	Jake Finch	Venturini Motorsports	Toyota	30.745	175.638
3	15	Kris Wright	Venturini Motorsports	Toyota	30.772	175.484
Full practice results

== Starting lineup ==
Qualifying was originally scheduled to be held on Saturday, May 4, at 10:10 AM CST. The qualifying system used is a multi-car, multi-lap based system. All drivers will be on track for a 20-minute timed session, and whoever sets the fastest time in that session will win the pole.

Qualifying was cancelled due to inclement weather. The starting lineup would be determined by practice speeds. As a result, Tanner Gray, driving for Joe Gibbs Racing, would claim the pole for the race.

=== Starting lineup ===
Pos.	#	Driver	Team	Make	Time	Speed
1	18	Tanner Gray	Joe Gibbs Racing	Toyota	30.723	175.764
2	20	Jake Finch	Venturini Motorsports	Toyota	30.745	175.638
3	15	Kris Wright	Venturini Motorsports	Toyota	30.772	175.484
4	6	Lavar Scott (R)	Rev Racing	Chevrolet	30.794	175.359
5	2	Andrés Pérez de Lara	Rev Racing	Chevrolet	30.846	175.063
6	22	Amber Balcaen	Venturini Motorsports	Toyota	30.864	174.961
7	55	Dean Thompson	Venturini Motorsports	Toyota	30.876	174.893
8	28	Connor Mosack	Pinnacle Racing Group	Chevrolet	30.887	174.831
9	73	Andy Jankowiak	KLAS Motorsports	Toyota	31.145	173.383
10	42	Tanner Reif	Cook Racing Technologies	Toyota	31.152	173.344
11	25	Toni Breidinger	Venturini Motorsports	Toyota	31.303	172.507
12	32	Christian Rose	AM Racing	Ford	31.384	172.062
13	33	Lawless Alan	Reaume Brothers Racing	Ford	31.507	171.390
14	17	Marco Andretti	Cook Racing Technologies	Chevrolet	31.564	171.081
15	11	Cody Dennison (R)	Fast Track Racing	Ford	32.183	167.790
16	10	Ryan Huff	Fast Track Racing	Ford	32.187	167.770
17	74	Mandy Chick	Team Chick Motorsports	Chevrolet	32.433	166.497
18	35	Greg Van Alst	Greg Van Alst Motorsports	Ford	33.608	160.676
19	99	Michael Maples (R)	Fast Track Racing	Chevrolet	33.660	160.428
20	12	Ryan Roulette	Fast Track Racing	Ford	34.019	158.735
21	31	Brayton Laster	Rise Motorsports	Chevrolet	34.093	158.390
22	06	Kevin Hinkle	Wayne Peterson Racing	Ford	35.988	150.050
23	48	Brad Smith	Brad Smith Motorsports	Ford	37.028	145.836
24	03	Alex Clubb	Clubb Racing Inc.	Ford	–	–
Withdrew
	68	Will Kimmel	Kimmel Racing	Ford		
	69	Scott Melton	Kimmel Racing	Toyota		
Official starting lineup

== Race results ==
Fin	St	#	Driver	Team	Make	Laps	Led	Status	Pts
1	8	28	Connor Mosack	Pinnacle Racing Group	Chevrolet	100	13	Running	47
2	1	18	Tanner Gray	Joe Gibbs Racing	Toyota	100	86	Running	45
3	7	55	Dean Thompson	Venturini Motorsports	Toyota	100	1	Running	42
4	3	15	Kris Wright	Venturini Motorsports	Toyota	100	0	Running	40
5	2	20	Jake Finch	Venturini Motorsports	Toyota	100	0	Running	39
6	9	73	Andy Jankowiak	KLAS Motorsports	Toyota	100	0	Running	38
7	5	2	Andrés Pérez de Lara	Rev Racing	Chevrolet	100	0	Running	37
8	6	22	Amber Balcaen	Venturini Motorsports	Toyota	100	0	Running	36
9	14	17	Marco Andretti	Cook Racing Technologies	Chevrolet	100	0	Running	35
10	11	25	Toni Breidinger	Venturini Motorsports	Toyota	99	0	Running	34
11	13	33	Lawless Alan	Reaume Brothers Racing	Ford	99	0	Running	33
12	18	35	Greg Van Alst	Greg Van Alst Motorsports	Ford	98	0	Running	32
13	4	6	Lavar Scott (R)	Rev Racing	Chevrolet	98	0	Running	31
14	12	32	Christian Rose	AM Racing	Ford	98	0	Running	30
15	17	74	Mandy Chick	Team Chick Motorsports	Chevrolet	97	0	Running	29
16	15	11	Cody Dennison (R)	Fast Track Racing	Ford	96	0	Running	28
17	18	10	Ryan Huff	Fast Track Racing	Ford	95	0	Running	27
18	14	42	Tanner Reif	Cook Racing Technologies	Toyota	95	0	Running	26
19	19	99	Michael Maples (R)	Fast Track Racing	Chevrolet	94	0	Running	25
20	20	12	Ryan Roulette	Fast Track Racing	Ford	93	0	Running	24
21	16	06	Kevin Hinckle	Wayne Peterson Racing	Ford	93	0	Running	23
22	21	31	Brayton Laster	Rise Motorsports	Chevrolet	90	0	Running	22
23	23	48	Brad Smith	Brad Smith Motorsports	Ford	88	0	Running	21
24	24	03	Alex Clubb	Clubb Racing Inc.	Ford	54	0	Oil Leak	20
Withdrew
		68	Will Kimmel	Kimmel Racing	Ford				
		69	Scott Melton	Kimmel Racing	Toyota				
Official race results

== Standings after the race ==
Drivers' Championship standings

	Pos	Driver	Points
	1	Andrés Pérez de Lara	230
	2	Greg Van Alst	224 (-6)
1	3	Amber Balcaen	211 (–19)
1	4	Christian Rose	210 (–20)
	5	Kris Wright	208 (–22)
	6	Lavar Scott	197 (–33)
	7	Andy Jankowiak	193 (–37)
	8	Toni Breidinger	189 (–41)
	9	Alex Clubb	165 (–65)
1	10	Michael Maples	165 (–65)

- Note: Only the first 10 positions are included for the driver standings.

Previous race: 2024 General Tire 150 (Dover)	ARCA Menards Series; 2024 season	Next race: 2024 General Tire 150 (Charlotte)
