= 2021 General Tire AnywhereIsPossible 200 =

2021 General Tire #AnywhereIsPossible 200
Race details
- Race 8 of 20 of the 2021 ARCA Menards Series
- Date: June 25, 2021
- Location: Long Pond, Pennsylvania, Pocono Raceway
- Course: Permanent racing facility
- Course length: 2.5 miles (4.0 km)
- Distance: 80 laps, 200 mi (321.869 km)
- Scheduled distance: 80 laps, 200 mi (321.869 km)
- Average speed: 115.979 miles per hour (186.650 km/h)

Pole position
Driver	Ty Gibbs	Joe Gibbs Racing
- Time: 52.393

Most laps led
Driver	Ty Gibbs	Joe Gibbs Racing
- Laps: 33

Winner
No. 20	Corey Heim	Venturini Motorsports

Television in the United States
- Network: Fox Sports 1
- Announcers: Jamie Little, Phil Parsons, Matt Crafton

Radio in the United States
- Radio: Motor Racing Network

The 2021 General Tire #AnywhereIsPossible 200 was the eighth race of the 2021 ARCA Menards Series season and the 37th iteration of the event. The race was held on Friday, June 25, 2021, in Long Pond, Pennsylvania, at Pocono Raceway, a 2.5 miles (4.0 km) triangular permanent course. The race took the scheduled 80 laps to complete. At race's end, Corey Heim of Venturini Motorsports would win a chaotic race to win his fourth career ARCA Menards Series win and his third of the season. To fill out the podium, Ty Gibbs of Joe Gibbs Racing and Drew Dollar of Venturini Motorsports would finish second and third, respectively.

== Background ==
The race was held at Pocono Raceway, which is a three-turn superspeedway located in Long Pond, Pennsylvania. The track hosts two annual NASCAR Sprint Cup Series races, as well as one Xfinity Series and Camping World Truck Series event. Until 2019, the track also hosted an IndyCar Series race.

Pocono Raceway is one of a very few NASCAR tracks not owned by either Speedway Motorsports, Inc. or International Speedway Corporation. It is operated by the Igdalsky siblings Brandon, Nicholas, and sister Ashley, and cousins Joseph IV and Chase Mattioli, all of whom are third-generation members of the family-owned Mattco Inc, started by Joseph II and Rose Mattioli.

Outside of the NASCAR races, the track is used throughout the year by Sports Car Club of America (SCCA) and motorcycle clubs as well as racing schools and an IndyCar race. The triangular oval also has three separate infield sections of racetrack – North Course, East Course and South Course. Each of these infield sections use a separate portion of the tri-oval to complete the track. During regular non-race weekends, multiple clubs can use the track by running on different infield sections. Also some of the infield sections can be run in either direction, or multiple infield sections can be put together – such as running the North Course and the South Course and using the tri-oval to connect the two.

=== Entry list ===
#	Driver	Team	Make	Sponsor
01	Stephanie Moyer	Fast Track Racing	Toyota	Council Cup Campground, Evergreen Raceway
2	Nick Sanchez	Rev Racing	Chevrolet	Max Siegel Incorporated
06	Don Thompson	Wayne Peterson Racing	Chevrolet	Great Railing
8	Sean Corr	Empire Racing	Chevrolet	Empire Racing
10	Ed Pompa	Fast Track Racing	Chevrolet	Burt Crane & Rigging, Cen-Pe-Co Lubricants, Double "H" Ranch
11	Jade Buford	Fast Track Racing	Toyota	Big Machine Vodka Spiked Cooler
12	Nick Igdalsky	Fast Track Racing	Toyota	Sunset Hill Shooting Range, Pocono Regional Police Foundation
15	Drew Dollar	Venturini Motorsports	Toyota	Sunbelt Rentals
18	Ty Gibbs	Joe Gibbs Racing	Toyota	Pristine Auction
20	Corey Heim	Venturini Motorsports	Toyota	JBL
21	Jack Wood	GMS Racing	Chevrolet	Chevrolet Accessories
23	Sam Mayer	Bret Holmes Racing	Chevrolet	QPS Employment Group
25	Chandler Smith	Venturini Motorsports	Toyota	Safelite Auto Glass
27	Tim Richmond	Richmond Clubb Motorsports	Toyota	Richmond Clubb Motorsports
28	Kyle Sieg	RSS Racing	Chevrolet	Empire Jerky
30	Kris Wright	Rette Jones Racing	Ford	Mastertech,
35	Greg Van Alst	Greg Van Alst Motorsports	Chevrolet	CB Fabricating
36	Ryan Huff	Huff Racing	Ford	Southeastern Services, H & H Excavation
46	Thad Moffitt	David Gilliland Racing	Ford	Aqua ChemPacs, CleanPacs
48	Brad Smith	Brad Smith Motorsports	Chevrolet	Henshaw Automation
50	Jett Noland	Niece Motorsports	Chevrolet	Noland's Roofing Inc., Hype Motorsports
57	Bryan Dauzat	Brother-In-Law Racing	Chevrolet	O. B. Builders Door & Trim
69	Scott Melton	Kimmel Racing	Ford	Melton-McFadden Insurance Agency
73	Andy Jankowiak	Jankowiak Motorsports	Ford	Phillips 66, K Konnect General Stores
97	Jason Kitzmiller	CR7 Motorsports	Chevrolet	A. L. L. Construction
Official entry list

== Practice ==
=== Open practice ===
An open session practice session of five hours would start on Thursday, June 24 at 9:00 AM EST. The practice was optional to any ARCA driver competing in the race. Ty Gibbs of Joe Gibbs Racing would set the fastest time in the session with a 52.967 and an average speed of 169.917 miles per hour (273.455 km/h).

Pos.	#	Driver	Team	Make	Time	Speed
1	18	Ty Gibbs	Joe Gibbs Racing	Toyota	52.967	169.917
2	20	Corey Heim	Venturini Motorsports	Toyota	53.690	167.629
3	25	Chandler Smith	Venturini Motorsports	Toyota	53.756	167.423
Full open practice results

=== First and final practice ===
The first and final 45-minute practice session was held on Friday, June 25, at 2:15 PM EST. Ty Gibbs of Joe Gibbs Racing would set the fastest time in the session with a 52.625 and an average speed of 171.021 miles per hour (275.232 km/h).

Pos.	#	Driver	Team	Make	Time	Speed
1	18	Ty Gibbs	Joe Gibbs Racing	Toyota	52.625	171.021
2	20	Corey Heim	Venturini Motorsports	Toyota	53.307	168.833
3	23	Sam Mayer	Bret Holmes Racing	Chevrolet	53.601	167.907
Full practice results

== Qualifying ==
Qualifying was held on Friday, June 25 at 4:00 PM EST. The qualifying session was a timed session. Ty Gibbs of Joe Gibbs Racing would win the pole, setting a lap time of 52.393 and an average speed of 171.779 miles per hour (276.452 km/h).

No drivers would fail to qualify- but, due to Van Alst's practice crash, he would not set a lap in qualifying, nor compete in the race.

=== Full qualifying results ===
Pos.	#	Driver	Team	Make	Time	Speed
1	18	Ty Gibbs	Joe Gibbs Racing	Toyota	52.393	171.779
2	25	Chandler Smith	Venturini Motorsports	Toyota	52.840	170.326
3	20	Corey Heim	Venturini Motorsports	Toyota	53.086	169.536
4	23	Sam Mayer	Bret Holmes Racing	Chevrolet	53.709	167.570
5	21	Jack Wood	GMS Racing	Chevrolet	53.780	167.348
6	2	Nick Sanchez	Rev Racing	Chevrolet	53.856	167.112
7	15	Drew Dollar	Venturini Motorsports	Toyota	53.915	166.929
8	28	Kyle Sieg	RSS Racing	Chevrolet	54.002	166.660
9	73	Andy Jankowiak	Jankowiak Motorsports	Ford	54.074	166.439
10	46	Thad Moffitt	David Gilliland Racing	Ford	55.067	163.437
11	11	Jade Buford	Fast Track Racing	Toyota	55.150	163.191
12	97	Jason Kitzmiller	CR7 Motorsports	Chevrolet	55.748	161.441
13	50	Jett Noland	Niece Motorsports	Chevrolet	56.204	160.131
14	69	Scott Melton	Kimmel Racing	Ford	56.590	159.039
15	36	Ryan Huff	Huff Racing	Ford	56.678	158.792
16	57	Bryan Dauzat	Brother-In-Law Racing	Chevrolet	56.680	158.786
17	8	Sean Corr	Empire Racing	Chevrolet	56.841	158.336
18	27	Tim Richmond	Richmond Clubb Motorsports	Toyota	57.176	157.409
19	10	Ed Pompa	Fast Track Racing	Chevrolet	58.558	153.694
20	01	Stephanie Moyer	Fast Track Racing	Toyota	1:00.066	149.835
21	12	Nick Igdalsky	Fast Track Racing	Toyota	1:00.159	149.604
22	48	Brad Smith	Brad Smith Motorsports	Chevrolet	1:03.281	142.223
23	06	Don Thompson	Wayne Peterson Racing	Chevrolet	1:04.729	139.041
24	30	Kris Wright	Rette Jones Racing	Ford	—	—
25	35	Greg Van Alst	Greg Van Alst Motorsports	Chevrolet	—	—
Official qualifying results

== Race results ==
Fin	St	#	Driver	Team	Make	Laps	Led	Status	Pts
1	3	20	Corey Heim	Venturini Motorsports	Toyota	80	17	running	47
2	1	18	Ty Gibbs	Joe Gibbs Racing	Toyota	80	33	running	44
3	7	15	Drew Dollar	Venturini Motorsports	Toyota	80	0	running	41
4	6	2	Nick Sanchez	Rev Racing	Chevrolet	80	0	running	40
5	10	46	Thad Moffitt	David Gilliland Racing	Ford	80	0	running	39
6	8	28	Kyle Sieg	RSS Racing	Chevrolet	80	0	running	38
7	9	73	Andy Jankowiak	Jankowiak Motorsports	Ford	80	0	running	37
8	11	11	Jade Buford	Fast Track Racing	Toyota	80	0	running	36
9	17	8	Sean Corr	Empire Racing	Chevrolet	79	0	running	35
10	15	36	Ryan Huff	Huff Racing	Ford	79	0	running	34
11	13	50	Jett Noland	Niece Motorsports	Chevrolet	79	0	running	33
12	2	25	Chandler Smith	Venturini Motorsports	Toyota	78	22	running	33
13	19	10	Ed Pompa	Fast Track Racing	Chevrolet	78	0	running	31
14	18	27	Tim Richmond	Richmond Clubb Motorsports	Toyota	77	0	running	30
15	20	01	Stephanie Moyer	Fast Track Racing	Toyota	77	0	running	29
16	22	48	Brad Smith	Brad Smith Motorsports	Chevrolet	73	0	running	28
17	12	97	Jason Kitzmiller	CR7 Motorsports	Chevrolet	59	3	accident	28
18	5	21	Jack Wood	GMS Racing	Chevrolet	58	5	accident	27
19	23	06	Don Thompson	Wayne Peterson Racing	Chevrolet	47	0	engine	25
20	16	57	Bryan Dauzat	Brother-In-Law Racing	Chevrolet	26	0	accident	24
21	21	12	Nick Igdalsky	Fast Track Racing	Toyota	26	0	accident	23
22	4	23	Sam Mayer	Bret Holmes Racing	Chevrolet	19	0	radiator	22
23	14	69	Scott Melton	Kimmel Racing	Ford	17	0	accident	21
24	24	30	Kris Wright	Rette Jones Racing	Ford	13	0	rear gear	20
25	25	35	Greg Van Alst*	Greg Van Alst Motorsports	Chevrolet	0	0	did not start	3
Official race results

*Van Alst would eventually be scored as last while not competing, as he had competed in some of the pre-race activities.

Previous race: 2021 Dawn 150	ARCA Menards Series; 2021 season	Next race: 2021 Menards 250
