= Ryan Huff Motorsports =

American stock car racing team

- Owner: James Huff
- Series: ARCA Menards Series
- Race drivers: ARCA Menards Series: 36. Ryan Huff (part-time)
- Manufacturer: Ford
- Opened: 2021

Career
- Debut: 2021 General Tire 200
- Races competed: 5
- Drivers' Championships: 0
- Race victories: 0
- Pole positions: 0

Ryan Huff Motorsports is an American stock car racing team that currently competes in the ARCA Menards Series, fielding the No. 36 Ford Fusion part-time for Ryan Huff. The team is owned by James Huff.

== NASCAR Craftsman Truck Series ==
=== Truck No. 36 history ===
In 2024, it was revealed that Huff would attempt the season-opening race for the Truck Series in his own No. 36 Toyota, using a truck purchased from Kyle Busch Motorsports before the aforementioned teams assets were purchased by Spire Motorsports.

==== Craftsman Truck Series ====
NASCAR Craftsman Truck Series results
Year	Team	No.	Make	1	2	3	4	5	6	7	8	9	10	11	12	13	14	15	16	17	18	19	20	21	22	23	NCTC	Pts	Ref
2024	Ryan Huff	36	Toyota	DAY; DNQ	ATL	LVS	BRI	COA	MAR	TEX	KAN	DAR	NWS	CLT	GTW	NSH	POC	IRP	RCH	MLW	BRI	KAN	TAL	HOM	MAR	PHO	N/A	0	

== ARCA Menards Series ==
=== Car No. 36 history ===
Starting in the 2021 General Tire 200, Ryan Huff would start his own team, driving the No. 36, and finishing 14th. At the 2021 General Tire AnywhereIsPossible 200, he scored his first ever top-10 finish. Huff has continued to run part time for the team, scoring two top-10 finishes for the team in 2022. In 2023, Huff ran the Daytona race. He started 4th but finished 37th after clutch issues.

==== Car No. 36 results ====
ARCA Racing Series results
Year	Driver	No.	Make	1	2	3	4	5	6	7	8	9	10	11	12	13	14	15	16	17	18	19	20	ARSC	Pts	Ref
2021	Ryan Huff	36	Ford	DAY	PHO	TAL; 14	KAN	TOL	CLT	MOH	POC; 10	ELK	BLN	IOW	WIN	GLN	MCH	ISF	MLW	DSF	BRI	SLM	KAN	57th	64	
2022	Ryan Huff	36	Ford	DAY; 10	PHO	TAL; 8	KAN																	N/A	91	
2022	Tim Monroe	36	Ford					CLT; 23	IOW	BLN	ELK	MOH	POC	IRP	MCH	GLN	ISF	MLW	DSF	KAN	BRI	SLM	TOL	N/A	91	
2023	Ryan Huff	36	Ford	DAY; 37	PHO	TAL	KAN	CLT	BLN	ELK	MOH	IOW	POC	MCH	IRP	GLN	ISF	MLW	DSF	KAN	BRI	SLM	TOL	N/A	7	
2024	Ryan Huff	36	Ford	DAY; 16	PHO	TAL; Wth	DOV	KAN	CLT; Wth	IOW	MOH	BLN	IRP	SLM	ELK	MCH	ISF	MLW	DSF	GLN	BRI	KAN	TOL			
2025	Ryan Huff	36	Ford	DAY; DNQ	PHO	TAL; 27	KAN	CLT; 15	MCH	BER	ELK	LRP	DOV	IRP	IOW	GLN	ISF	MAD	DSF	BRI	SLM	KAN	TOL	-*	-*	
