= Ryan Huff =

American racing driver

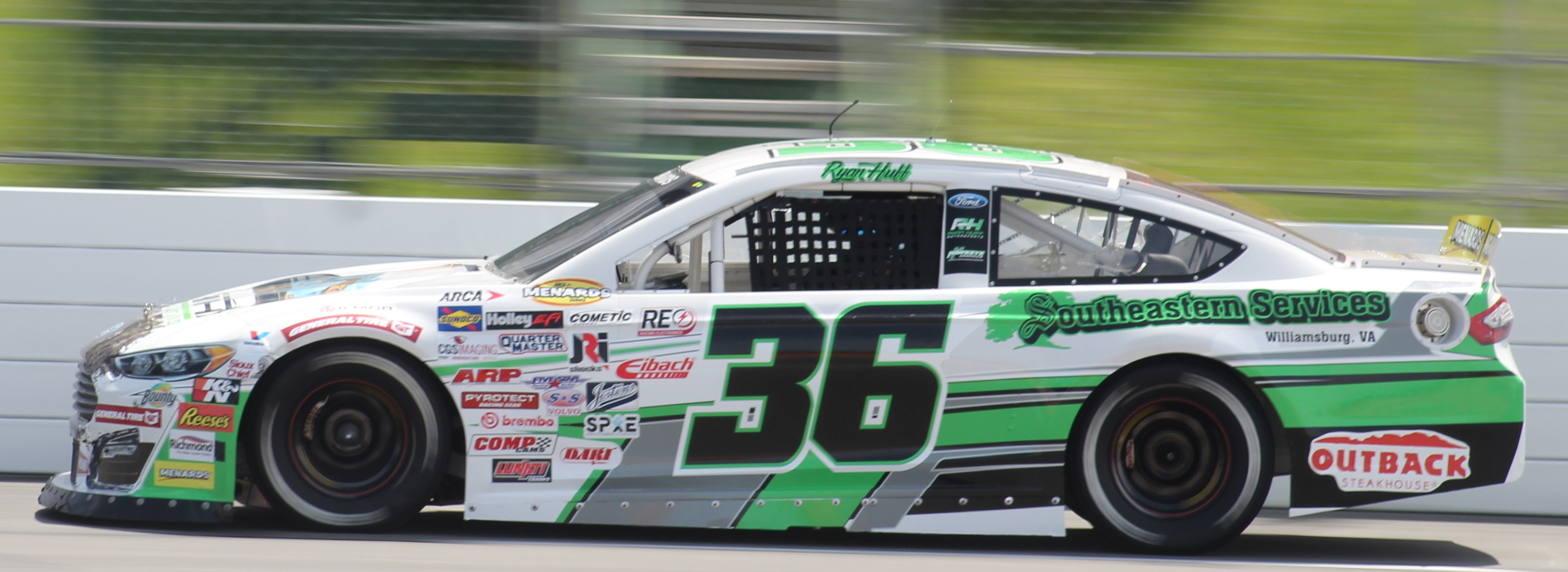
- Huff's No. 36 ARCA car at Pocono in 2021
- Born: Ryan James Huff; April 13, 2001 (age 25); Williamsburg, Virginia, U.S.

NASCAR FedEx Freight Truck Series career
- 3 races run over 2 years
- 2022 position: 68th
- Best finish: 55th (2020)
- First race: 2020 E.P.T. 200 (Kansas)
- Last race: 2022 Heart of America 200 (Kansas)
Wins	Top tens	Poles
0	0	0

ARCA Menards Series career
- 22 races run over 7 years
- Best finish: 14th (2020)
- First race: 2020 Lucas Oil 200 (Daytona)
- Last race: 2026 Alabama Manufactured Housing 200 (Talladega)
Wins	Top tens	Poles
0	6	0
- Statistics up to date as of April 25, 2026.

Ryan James Huff (born April 13, 2001) is an American professional stock car racing driver. He last competed part-time in the ARCA Menards Series, driving the No. 36 Ford Fusion for his own team, Ryan Huff Motorsports. He has previously competed in the NASCAR Craftsman Truck Series.

== Racing career ==
In 2020, Huff made his debut in the ARCA Menards Series for Fast Track Racing in the team's No. 10 car in the season-opener at Daytona. It then looked like Huff would be the full-time driver of that car that year, replacing Tommy Vigh Jr., as he drove the car in the next five races. However, Fast Track replaced him with Mike Basham for the race at Iowa as well as other races throughout the season.

Huff made his NASCAR Truck Series debut in the second race of the doubleheader at Kansas in 2020 driving the No. 00 for Reaume Brothers Racing. He finished 19th in the race. Huff ran one more Truck Series race in 2020 at Richmond in the Cram Racing Enterprises No. 41.

In 2021, Huff was scheduled to drive part-time in the Truck Series for CMI Motorsports in their No. 83 truck beginning at the season-opener at Daytona. When it was announced that Tim Viens would instead be driving the No. 83 truck in that race, CMI revealed in a tweet that Huff would instead drive for them in other races. However, Huff did not end up running any races for the team in 2021. Huff started his own ARCA team that year, Huff Racing, with himself driving the No. 36 car in the races at Talladega and Pocono. He and his team also entered the races at Daytona and Talladega in 2022. Huff returned to the Truck Series for the spring race at Kansas in 2022, driving the No. 46 for G2G Racing, which looked very similar to the truck at Darlington which Brennan Poole drove.

In 2024, it was revealed that Huff would attempt the season-opening race for the Truck Series in his own No. 36 Toyota, using a truck purchased from Kyle Busch Motorsports before the aforementioned teams assets were purchased by Spire Motorsports.

== Motorsports career results ==
=== NASCAR ===
(key) (Bold – Pole position awarded by qualifying time. Italics – Pole position earned by points standings or practice time. * – Most laps led.)

==== Craftsman Truck Series ====
NASCAR Craftsman Truck Series results
Year	Team	No.	Make	1	2	3	4	5	6	7	8	9	10	11	12	13	14	15	16	17	18	19	20	21	22	23	NCTC	Pts	Ref
2020	Reaume Brothers Racing	00	Toyota	DAY	LVS	CLT	ATL	HOM	POC	KEN	TEX	KAN	KAN; 19	MCH	DRC	DOV	GTW	DAR									55th	27	
2020	Cram Racing Enterprises	41	Chevy																RCH; 28	BRI	LVS	TAL	KAN	TEX	MAR	PHO	55th	27	
2022	G2G Racing	46	Toyota	DAY	LVS	ATL	COA	MAR	BRD	DAR	KAN; 28	TEX	CLT	GTW	SON	KNX	NSH	MOH	POC	IRP	RCH	KAN	BRI	TAL	HOM	PHO	68th	9	
2024	Ryan Huff Motorsports	36	Toyota	DAY; DNQ	ATL	LVS	BRI	COA	MAR	TEX	KAN	DAR	NWS	CLT	GTW	NSH	POC	IRP	RCH	MLW	BRI	KAN	TAL	HOM	MAR	PHO	N/A	0	

^{*} Season still in progress
^{1} Ineligible for series points

=== ARCA Menards Series ===
(key) (Bold – Pole position awarded by qualifying time. Italics – Pole position earned by points standings or practice time. * – Most laps led.)

ARCA Menards Series results
Year	Team	No.	Make	1	2	3	4	5	6	7	8	9	10	11	12	13	14	15	16	17	18	19	20	AMSC	Pts	Ref
2020	Fast Track Racing	10	Toyota	DAY; 21	PHO; 24	TAL; 12		IRP; 16																14th	255	
2020	Fast Track Racing	10	Ford				POC; 9		KEN; 8	IOW	KAN; 13	TOL	TOL	MCH	DRC	GTW	L44	TOL	BRI	WIN	MEM	ISF	KAN	14th	255	
2021	Huff Racing	36	Ford	DAY	PHO	TAL; 14	KAN	TOL	CLT	MOH	POC; 10	ELK	BLN	IOW	WIN	GLN	MCH	ISF	MLW	DSF	BRI	SLM	KAN	57th	64	
2022	Huff Racing	36	Ford	DAY; 10	PHO	TAL; 8																		23rd	170	
2022	Fast Track Racing	10	Ford				KAN; 14	CLT; 13	IOW	BLN	ELK	MOH	POC	IRP	MCH	GLN	ISF	MLW	DSF					23rd	170	
2022	Fast Track Racing	11	Ford																	KAN; 5	BRI	SLM	TOL	23rd	170	
2023	Huff Racing	36	Ford	DAY; 37	PHO	TAL	KAN	CLT	BLN	ELK	MOH	IOW	POC	MCH	IRP	GLN	ISF	MLW	DSF					81st	36	
2023	Fast Track Racing	12	Ford																	KAN; 15	BRI	SLM	TOL	81st	36	
2024	Ryan Huff Motorsports	36	Ford	DAY; 16	PHO	TAL; Wth	DOV		CLT; Wth	IOW	MOH	BLN	IRP	SLM	ELK	MCH	ISF	MLW	DSF	GLN	BRI	KAN	TOL	65th	56	
2024	Fast Track Racing	10	Ford					KAN; 17																65th	56	
2025	Ryan Huff Motorsports	36	Ford	DAY; DNQ	PHO	TAL; 27	KAN	CLT; 15	MCH	BLN	ELK	LRP	DOV	IRP	IOW	GLN	ISF	MAD	DSF	BRI	SLM	KAN	TOL	78th	49	
2026	Ryan Huff Motorsports	36	Ford	DAY; 40	PHO	KAN	TAL; 30	GLN	TOL	MCH	POC	BER	ELK	CHI	LRP	IRP	IOW	ISF	MAD	DSF	SLM	BRI	KAN	123rd	19	

==== ARCA Menards Series East ====
ARCA Menards Series East results
Year	Team	No.	Make	1	2	3	4	5	6	7	8	AMSEC	Pts	Ref
2026	Ryan Huff Motorsports	36	Toyota	HCY	CAR; Wth	NSV	TOL	IRP	FRS	IOW	BRI	N/A	0	
