= 2024 Fresh From Florida 250 =

1st race of the 2024 NASCAR Craftsman Truck Series

Race details
- Race 1 of 23 of the 2024 NASCAR Craftsman Truck Series
- Date: February 16, 2024
- Official name: 25th Annual Fresh From Florida 250
- Location: Daytona International Speedway, Daytona Beach, Florida
- Course: Permanent racing facility
- Course length: 2.5 miles (4.0 km)
- Distance: 101 laps, 252 mi (405 km)
- Scheduled distance: 100 laps, 250 mi (402 km)
- Average speed: 98.933 mph (159.217 km/h)

Pole position
Driver	Ty Majeski	ThorSport Racing
- Time: 50.345

Most laps led
Driver	Nick Sanchez	Rev Racing
- Laps: 26

Winner
No. 2	Nick Sanchez	Rev Racing

Television in the United States
- Network: FS1
- Announcers: Adam Alexander, Phil Parsons, and Michael Waltrip

Radio in the United States
- Radio: MRN

The 2024 Fresh From Florida 250 was the 1st stock car race of the 2024 NASCAR Craftsman Truck Series, and the 25th iteration of the event. The race was held on Friday, February 16, 2024, at Daytona International Speedway in Daytona Beach, Florida, a 2.5 miles (4.0 km) permanent tri-oval shaped asphalt superspeedway. The race was originally scheduled to be contested over 100 laps, but was extended to 101 laps due to a NASCAR overtime finish. In a wild race that saw several crashes, Nick Sanchez, driving for Rev Racing, would win his first career NASCAR Craftsman Truck Series race when a multi-truck accident occurred on the final lap with him in the lead when the caution was thrown. Sanchez was a consistent presence during the race, leading a race-high 26 laps, despite his involvement in an earlier accident. To fill out the podium, Corey Heim, driving for Tricon Garage, and Rajah Caruth, driving for Spire Motorsports, would finish 2nd and 3rd, respectively.

On the final lap of the race, a significant pileup occurred exiting turn two after Rajah Caruth drifted up the track into the side of Jack Wood, spinning him out and collecting numerous trucks. Tricon Garage driver Taylor Gray was turned into the outside wall and went airborne after being hit almost head-on at high speed by Daniel Dye, doing a complete backwards barrell roll on top of other trucks before coming rest on all four tires. He exited under his own power and was taken and released from the infield care center shortly after.

== Report ==
Daytona International Speedway is a race track in Daytona Beach, Florida that is one of five superspeedways, the others being Pocono Raceway, Indianapolis Motor Speedway, Michigan International Speedway, and Talladega Superspeedway.

=== Background ===
Daytona International Speedway, the circuit where the race was held.

Daytona International Speedway is one of three superspeedways to hold NASCAR races, the other two being Atlanta Motor Speedway and Talladega Superspeedway. The standard track at Daytona International Speedway is a four-turn superspeedway that is 2.5 miles (4.0 km) long. The track's turns are banked at 31 degrees, while the front stretch, the location of the finish line, is banked at 18 degrees.

==== Entry list ====
- (R) denotes rookie driver.
- (i) denotes driver who is ineligible for series driver points.

#	Driver	Team	Make
1	Toni Breidinger	Tricon Garage	Toyota
02	Mason Massey	Young's Motorsports	Chevrolet
2	Nick Sanchez	Rev Racing	Chevrolet
04	Cory Roper	Roper Racing	Chevrolet
5	Dean Thompson	Tricon Garage	Toyota
7	Corey LaJoie (i)	Spire Motorsports	Chevrolet
9	Grant Enfinger	CR7 Motorsports	Chevrolet
10	Jennifer Jo Cobb	Jennifer Jo Cobb Racing	Chevrolet
11	Corey Heim	Tricon Garage	Toyota
13	Jake Garcia	ThorSport Racing	Ford
15	Tanner Gray	Tricon Garage	Toyota
17	Taylor Gray	Tricon Garage	Toyota
18	Tyler Ankrum	McAnally-Hilgemann Racing	Chevrolet
19	Christian Eckes	McAnally-Hilgemann Racing	Chevrolet
21	Mason Maggio	Floridian Motorsports	Toyota
22	Jason White	Reaume Brothers Racing	Ford
25	Ty Dillon	Rackley WAR	Chevrolet
27	Keith McGee	Reaume Brothers Racing	Ford
28	Bryan Dauzat	FDNY Racing	Chevrolet
32	Bret Holmes	Bret Holmes Racing	Chevrolet
33	Lawless Alan	Reaume Brothers Racing	Ford
36	Ryan Huff	Ryan Huff Motorsports	Toyota
38	Layne Riggs (R)	Front Row Motorsports	Ford
41	Bayley Currey	Niece Motorsports	Chevrolet
42	Matt Mills	Niece Motorsports	Chevrolet
43	Daniel Dye	McAnally-Hilgemann Racing	Chevrolet
45	Johnny Sauter	Niece Motorsports	Chevrolet
46	Thad Moffitt (R)	Faction46	Chevrolet
52	Stewart Friesen	Halmar Friesen Racing	Toyota
56	Timmy Hill	Hill Motorsports	Toyota
71	Rajah Caruth	Spire Motorsports	Chevrolet
75	Stefan Parsons	Henderson Motorsports	Chevrolet
76	Spencer Boyd	Freedom Racing Enterprises	Chevrolet
77	Chase Purdy	Spire Motorsports	Chevrolet
88	Matt Crafton	ThorSport Racing	Ford
91	Jack Wood	McAnally-Hilgemann Racing	Chevrolet
95	Clay Greenfield	GK Racing	Chevrolet
97	Codie Rohrbaugh	CR7 Motorsports	Chevrolet
98	Ty Majeski	ThorSport Racing	Ford
99	Ben Rhodes	ThorSport Racing	Ford
Official entry list

== Practice ==
The first and only practice session was held on Thursday, February 15, at 5:05 PM EST, and would last for 50 minutes. Johnny Sauter, driving for Niece Motorsports, would set the fastest time in the session, with a lap of 47.258, and a speed of 190.444 mph (306.490 km/h).

Pos.	#	Driver	Team	Make	Time	Speed
1	45	Johnny Sauter	Niece Motorsports	Chevrolet	47.258	190.444
2	15	Tanner Gray	Tricon Garage	Toyota	47.285	190.335
3	25	Ty Dillon	Rackley WAR	Chevrolet	47.310	190.235
Full practice results

== Qualifying ==
Qualifying was held on Friday, February 16, at 3:00 PM EST. Since Daytona International Speedway is a superspeedway, the qualifying system used is a single-car, single-lap system with two rounds. In the first round, drivers have one lap to set a time. The fastest ten drivers from the first round will move on to the second round. Whoever sets the fastest time in Round 2 will win the pole.

Ty Majeski, driving for ThorSport Racing, would advance from the preliminary round and set the fastest time in Round 2, with a lap of 50.345, and a speed of 178.767 mph (287.698 km/h).

Four drivers would fail to qualify: Mason Maggio, Clay Greenfield, Jennifer Jo Cobb, and Ryan Huff.

=== Qualifying results ===
Pos.	#	Driver	Team	Make	Time (R1)	Speed (R1)	Time (R2)	Speed (R2)
1	98	Ty Majeski	ThorSport Racing	Ford	50.496	178.232	50.345	178.767
2	45	Johnny Sauter	Niece Motorsports	Chevrolet	50.497	178.228	50.363	178.703
3	7	Corey LaJoie (i)	Spire Motorsports	Chevrolet	50.490	178.253	50.443	178.419
4	42	Matt Mills	Niece Motorsports	Chevrolet	50.470	178.324	50.491	178.250
5	18	Tyler Ankrum	McAnally-Hilgemann Racing	Chevrolet	50.516	178.161	50.576	177.950
6	2	Nick Sanchez	Rev Racing	Chevrolet	50.631	177.757	50.602	177.859
7	43	Daniel Dye	McAnally-Hilgemann Racing	Chevrolet	50.749	177.343	50.641	177.722
8	15	Tanner Gray	Tricon Garage	Toyota	50.698	177.522	50.694	177.536
9	41	Bayley Currey	Niece Motorsports	Chevrolet	50.678	177.592	50.884	176.873
10	46	Thad Moffitt (R)	Faction46	Chevrolet	50.733	177.399	51.021	176.398
Eliminated in Round 1
11	88	Matt Crafton	ThorSport Racing	Ford	50.768	177.277	—	—
12	17	Taylor Gray	Tricon Garage	Toyota	50.770	177.270	—	—
13	1	Toni Breidinger	Tricon Garage	Toyota	50.862	176.949	—	—
14	97	Codie Rohrbaugh	CR7 Motorsports	Chevrolet	50.887	176.862	—	—
15	5	Dean Thompson	Tricon Garage	Toyota	50.904	176.803	—	—
16	13	Jake Garcia	ThorSport Racing	Ford	50.907	176.793	—	—
17	52	Stewart Friesen	Halmar Friesen Racing	Toyota	50.922	176.741	—	—
18	77	Chase Purdy	Spire Motorsports	Chevrolet	50.936	176.692	—	—
19	32	Bret Holmes	Bret Holmes Racing	Chevrolet	50.944	176.665	—	—
20	71	Rajah Caruth	Spire Motorsports	Chevrolet	50.962	176.602	—	—
21	38	Layne Riggs (R)	Front Row Motorsports	Ford	50.967	176.585	—	—
22	9	Grant Enfinger	CR7 Motorsports	Chevrolet	50.991	176.502	—	—
23	91	Jack Wood	McAnally-Hilgemann Racing	Chevrolet	50.994	176.491	—	—
24	99	Ben Rhodes	ThorSport Racing	Ford	51.028	176.374	—	—
25	19	Christian Eckes	McAnally-Hilgemann Racing	Chevrolet	51.077	176.205	—	—
26	11	Corey Heim	Tricon Garage	Toyota	51.080	176.194	—	—
27	75	Stefan Parsons	Henderson Motorsports	Chevrolet	51.124	176.043	—	—
28	25	Ty Dillon	Rackley WAR	Chevrolet	51.161	175.915	—	—
29	28	Bryan Dauzat	FDNY Racing	Chevrolet	51.163	175.908	—	—
30	04	Cory Roper	Roper Racing	Chevrolet	51.208	175.754	—	—
31	76	Spencer Boyd	Freedom Racing Enterprises	Chevrolet	51.210	175.747	—	—
Qualified by owner's points
32	02	Mason Massey	Young's Motorsports	Chevrolet	51.310	175.404	—	—
33	56	Timmy Hill	Hill Motorsports	Toyota	51.343	175.292	—	—
34	22	Jason White	Reaume Brothers Racing	Ford	51.405	175.080	—	—
35	33	Lawless Alan	Reaume Brothers Racing	Ford	51.477	174.835	—	—
36	27	Keith McGee	Reaume Brothers Racing	Ford	52.192	172.440	—	—
Failed to qualify
37	21	Mason Maggio	Floridian Motorsports	Toyota	51.289	175.476	—	—
38	95	Clay Greenfield	GK Racing	Chevrolet	51.362	175.227	—	—
39	10	Jennifer Jo Cobb	Jennifer Jo Cobb Racing	Chevrolet	51.437	174.971	—	—
40	36	Ryan Huff	Ryan Huff Motorsports	Toyota	52.338	171.959	—	—
Official qualifying results
Official starting lineup

== Race results ==
Stage 1 Laps: 20

Pos.	#	Driver	Team	Make	Pts
1	45	Johnny Sauter	Niece Motorsports	Chevrolet	10
2	98	Ty Majeski	ThorSport Racing	Ford	9
3	41	Bayley Currey	Niece Motorsports	Chevrolet	8
4	18	Tyler Ankrum	McAnally-Hilgemann Racing	Chevrolet	7
5	17	Taylor Gray	Tricon Garage	Toyota	6
6	32	Bret Holmes	Bret Holmes Racing	Chevrolet	5
7	91	Jack Wood	McAnally-Hilgemann Racing	Chevrolet	4
8	19	Christian Eckes	McAnally-Hilgemann Racing	Chevrolet	3
9	5	Dean Thompson	Tricon Garage	Toyota	2
10	11	Corey Heim	Tricon Garage	Toyota	1

Stage 2 Laps: 20

Pos.	#	Driver	Team	Make	Pts
1	18	Tyler Ankrum	McAnally-Hilgemann Racing	Chevrolet	10
2	19	Christian Eckes	McAnally-Hilgemann Racing	Chevrolet	9
3	88	Matt Crafton	ThorSport Racing	Ford	8
4	43	Daniel Dye	McAnally-Hilgemann Racing	Chevrolet	7
5	99	Ben Rhodes	ThorSport Racing	Ford	6
6	98	Ty Majeski	ThorSport Racing	Ford	5
7	7	Corey LaJoie (i)	Spire Motorsports	Chevrolet	0
8	9	Grant Enfinger	CR7 Motorsports	Chevrolet	3
9	2	Nick Sanchez	Rev Racing	Chevrolet	2
10	11	Corey Heim	Tricon Garage	Toyota	1

Stage 3 Laps: 61

Fin	St	#	Driver	Team	Make	Laps	Led	Status	Pts
1	6	2	Nick Sanchez	Rev Racing	Chevrolet	101	26	Running	42
2	26	11	Corey Heim	Tricon Garage	Toyota	101	0	Running	37
3	20	71	Rajah Caruth	Spire Motorsports	Chevrolet	101	1	Running	34
4	19	32	Bret Holmes	Bret Holmes Racing	Chevrolet	101	13	Running	38
5	31	76	Spencer Boyd	Freedom Racing Enterprises	Chevrolet	101	0	Running	32
6	27	75	Stefan Parsons	Henderson Motorsports	Chevrolet	101	0	Running	31
7	11	88	Matt Crafton	ThorSport Racing	Ford	101	0	Running	38
8	33	56	Timmy Hill	Hill Motorsports	Toyota	101	0	Running	29
9	29	28	Bryan Dauzat	FDNY Racing	Chevrolet	101	0	Running	28
10	25	19	Christian Eckes	McAnally-Hilgemann Racing	Chevrolet	101	1	Running	39
11	5	18	Tyler Ankrum	McAnally-Hilgemann Racing	Chevrolet	101	16	Running	43
12	34	22	Jason White	Reaume Brothers Racing	Ford	101	0	Running	25
13	9	41	Bayley Currey	Niece Motorsports	Chevrolet	101	0	Running	32
14	17	52	Stewart Friesen	Halmar Friesen Racing	Toyota	101	0	Running	23
15	8	15	Tanner Gray	Tricon Garage	Toyota	101	1	Running	22
16	1	98	Ty Majeski	ThorSport Racing	Ford	101	6	Running	35
17	22	9	Grant Enfinger	CR7 Motorsports	Chevrolet	101	2	Running	23
18	23	91	Jack Wood	McAnally-Hilgemann Racing	Chevrolet	101	0	Running	23
19	12	17	Taylor Gray	Tricon Garage	Toyota	100	0	Accident	24
20	3	7	Corey LaJoie (i)	Spire Motorsports	Chevrolet	100	5	Accident	0
21	7	43	Daniel Dye	McAnally-Hilgemann Racing	Chevrolet	100	0	Accident	23
22	30	04	Cory Roper	Roper Racing	Chevrolet	100	0	Accident	15
23	14	97	Codie Rohrbaugh	CR7 Motorsports	Chevrolet	100	0	Accident	14
24	15	5	Dean Thompson	Tricon Garage	Toyota	100	0	Accident	15
25	32	02	Mason Massey	Young's Motorsports	Chevrolet	100	0	Running	12
26	4	42	Matt Mills	Niece Motorsports	Chevrolet	99	0	Running	11
27	13	1	Toni Breidinger	Tricon Garage	Toyota	97	0	Running	10
28	18	77	Chase Purdy	Spire Motorsports	Chevrolet	93	1	Accident	9
29	2	45	Johnny Sauter	Niece Motorsports	Chevrolet	79	24	Accident	18
30	24	99	Ben Rhodes	ThorSport Racing	Ford	71	5	Accident	13
31	36	27	Keith McGee	Reaume Brothers Racing	Ford	44	0	Accident	6
32	35	33	Lawless Alan	Reaume Brothers Racing	Ford	27	0	Overheating	5
33	21	38	Layne Riggs (R)	Front Row Motorsports	Ford	13	0	DVP	4
34	16	13	Jake Garcia	ThorSport Racing	Ford	6	0	Accident	3
35	28	25	Ty Dillon	Rackley WAR	Chevrolet	5	0	Accident	2
36	10	46	Thad Moffitt (R)	Faction46	Chevrolet	5	0	Accident	1
Official race results

== Standings after the race ==
Drivers' Championship standings

Pos	Driver	Points
1	Tyler Ankrum	43
2	Nick Sanchez	42 (-1)
3	Christian Eckes	39 (–4)
4	Bret Holmes	38 (–5)
5	Matt Crafton	38 (–5)
6	Corey Heim	37 (–6)
7	Ty Majeski	35 (–8)
8	Rajah Caruth	34 (–9)
9	Spencer Boyd	32 (–11)
10	Bayley Currey	32 (–11)
Official driver's standings

Manufacturers' Championship standings

Pos	Manufacturer	Points
1	Chevrolet	40
2	Toyota	34 (–6)
3	Ford	29 (–11)

- Note: Only the first 10 positions are included for the driver standings.

Previous race: 2023 Craftsman 150	NASCAR Craftsman Truck Series; 2024 season	Next race: 2024 Fr8 208
