= Amber Balcaen =

Canadian racing driver (born 1992)

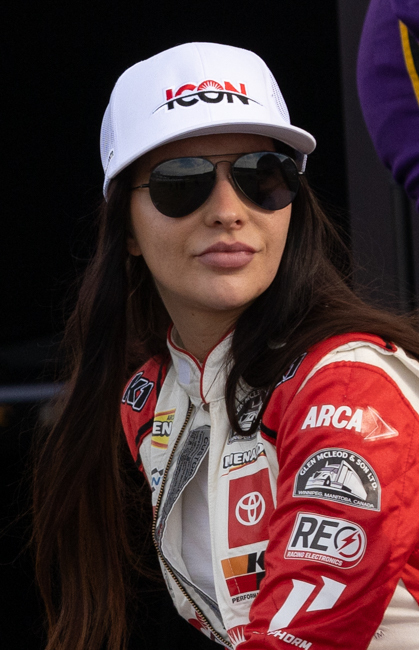
- Balcaen at Iowa in 2024
- Born: March 7, 1992 (age 34); Winnipeg, Manitoba, Canada

NASCAR Canada Series career
- 2 races run over 2 years
- Best finish: 54th (2023)
- First race: 2023 Pinty's Fall Brawl (Delaware Speedway)
- Last race: 2024 Freshstone Dirt Classic (Ohsweken)
Wins	Top tens	Poles
0	0	0

ARCA Menards Series career
- 45 races run over 4 years
- Best finish: 6th (2024)
- First race: 2022 Lucas Oil 200 (Daytona)
- Last race: 2025 General Tire 200 (Talladega)
Wins	Top tens	Poles
0	14	0

ARCA Menards Series East career
- 9 races run over 3 years
- Best finish: 17th (2022)
- First race: 2017 Jet Tools 150 (New Smyrna)
- Last race: 2024 Bush's Beans 20 (Bristol)
Wins	Top tens	Poles
0	1	0

ARCA Menards Series West career
- 5 races run over 5 years
- Best finish: 25th (2021)
- First race: 2021 NAPA Auto Parts 150 (Irwindale)
- Last race: 2024 General Tire 150 (Phoenix)
Wins	Top tens	Poles
0	0	0
- Statistics up to date as of February 18, 2025.

Amber Balcaen (born March 7, 1992) is a Canadian professional stock car racing driver. She last competed part-time in the ARCA Menards Series, driving the No. 70 Toyota Camry for Nitro Motorsports.

== Racing career ==
=== Early career ===
Balcaen began racing at ten years old, driving go-karts in several dirt tracks around North Dakota. At sixteen years old, she bought her first lightning sprint car and became the first female driver to win in a dirt track racing championship in Manitoba.

Balcaen made her Northern Outlaw Sprint Association debut in 2014, for a full-time schedule. She won Rookie of the Year that season and became the highest finishing female in Northern Outlaw Sprint Association History.

=== Chili Bowl Nationals ===
Balcaen competed in the 2015 Chili Bowl Nationals.

=== NASCAR Whelen All-American Series ===
Balcaen got the attention of the NASCAR Drive for Diversity program and drove in the 2016 NASCAR Whelen All-American Series (now NASCAR Advance Auto Parts Weekly Series). That year, she made history as she became the first female Canadian driver to win a NASCAR-sanctioned race in the United States, winning at Motor Mile Speedway. She earned eleven top fives in her first season, giving her Rookie of the Year honors. She went on to win at the same track a year later, getting her second overall series win.

=== NASCAR K&N Pro Series East ===
Balcaen made her NASCAR K&N Pro Series East debut in 2017, driving at New Smyrna Speedway for Martin-McClure Racing. She started 21st and finished 20th, after getting involved in a late race wreck. She had a spark plug wire come off her car, which resulted in a penalty, putting her six laps down.

=== CARS Super Late Model Tour ===
Balcaen made her first start in the CARS Super Late Model Tour in 2018, driving the No. 4 for Kyle Busch Motorsports at Hickory Motor Speedway. Balcaen started 26th and finished 28th, after being involved in an early race wreck.

On March 21, Kyle Busch Motorsports announced that Balcaen would drive two late model races in 2019, the Pro All Star Series race at Hickory Motor Speedway, and the CARS Super Late Model Tour race at Motor Mile Speedway. Balcaen started 22nd finished fourteenth at Motor Mile.

=== POWRi Midget Racing ===
In 2020, Balcaen competed in the POWRi Midget Racing Series, failing to qualify for most of the races. She was only able to qualify for two races, finishing 22nd and 12th respectively. On July 11, 2020, Balcaen was involved in a serious wreck at the Valley Speedway, after she got loose in turn 4, causing her sprint car to go off course, and flip multiple times into a fence. Balcaen suffered collapsed lungs, a severe concussion, and several burns to her arms. She was immediately taken to a local hospital for further evaluation. She wasn't released for three days, and had her racing career put on hold for about three months.

=== ARCA Menards Series West ===
Balcaen made her first ARCA Menards Series West start for Bill McAnally Racing at Irwindale Speedway in 2021, finishing 15th. She made two more starts that season, finishing 11th and 22nd at Irwindale and Las Vegas respectively.

=== ARCA Menards Series ===
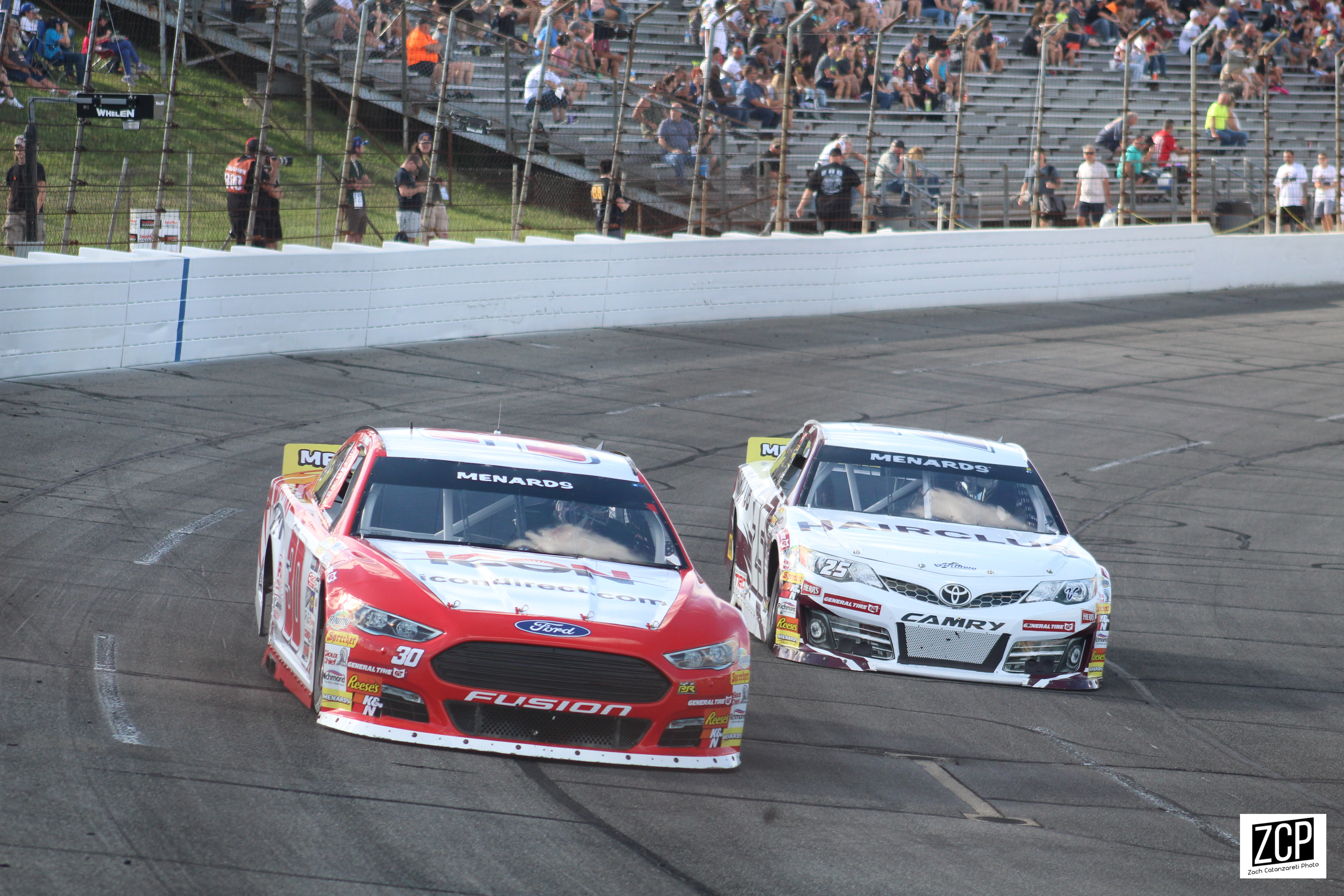
Balcaen (No. 30) and Toni Breidinger (No. 25) at the Lucas Oil Indianapolis Raceway Park in 2022.

==== Rette Jones Racing (2022) ====
On January 3, 2022, Rette Jones Racing announced Balcaen would run the full upcoming ARCA Menards Series season. She would earn six top-tens throughout the season, and finish seventh in the final point standings.

==== Venturini Motorsports (2023–2024) ====
On January 12, 2023, it was announced that Balcaen would join Venturini Motorsports for the 2023 season, running the races at Daytona and Talladega. She would also run the first race at Kansas. She earned a career-best finish of 6th at Daytona.

On January 9, 2024, it was announced that Balcaen would run full-time for VMS in the 2024 season, driving the No. 22 car. During the 2024 General Tire 150 at Dover, on lap 75, Balcaen was trying to avoid Christian Rose, who had hit the wall due to a flat tire. However, due to Dover's self-cleaning design, her car spun and also hit the wall. She required assistance to exit the car and left the track on a stretcher, due to a non-displaced fracture in the third metatarsal of her left foot. She was able to avoid missing any races by driving with a carbon fiber plate in her left shoe. She would tie her career-best finish of sixth in the Reese's 150 and ended the year sixth in the final standings.

==== Nitro Motorsports (2025) ====
On January 9, 2025, it was announced that Balcaen would compete part-time for Nitro Motorsports in the 2025 season, beginning with the season opener at Daytona. Balcaen would set the fastest time in the annual pre-practice.

== Personal life ==
Balcaen was the co-host of the TV series Cars That Rock with AC/DC band member, Brian Johnson. She is also a motivational speaker, who is currently helping other people from around the world achieve their goals in life. In 2019, she was a main cast member of the NASCAR reality show, Racing Wives, on CMT. She was a spokesperson for Canada's biggest automotive company, Kal Tire, during a winter campaign.

== Filmography ==
=== Television ===
Year	Title	Role	Notes
2017	Cars That Rock	Herself (co-host)	
2018	Fins & Skins Classic Adventures	Herself (guest)	
2019	Racing Wives	Herself	

== Motorsports career results ==
=== ARCA Menards Series ===
(key) (Bold – Pole position awarded by qualifying time. Italics – Pole position earned by points standings or practice time. * – Most laps led.)

ARCA Menards Series results
Year	Team	No.	Make	1	2	3	4	5	6	7	8	9	10	11	12	13	14	15	16	17	18	19	20	AMSC	Pts	Ref
2022	Rette Jones Racing	30	Ford	DAY; 16	PHO; 30	TAL; 12	KAN; 9	CLT; 7	IOW; 10	BLN; 11	ELK; 17	MOH; 15	POC; 21	IRP; 21	MCH; 18	GLN; 19		MLW; 14		KAN; 8	BRI; 31	SLM; 9	TOL; 10	7th	774	
2022	Rette Jones Racing	30	Toyota														ISF; 14		DSF; 14					7th	774	
2023	Venturini Motorsports	15	Toyota	DAY; 6	PHO	TAL; 31	KAN; 22	CLT	BLN	ELK	MOH	IOW	POC	MCH	IRP	GLN	ISF	MLW	DSF	KAN	BRI	SLM	TOL	53rd	73	
2024	Venturini Motorsports	22	Toyota	DAY; 9	PHO; 15	TAL; 7	DOV; 20	KAN; 8	CLT; 15	IOW; 24	MOH; 16	BLN; 10	IRP; 13	SLM; 24	ELK; 12	MCH; 10	ISF; 8	MLW; 20	DSF; 11	GLN; 29	BRI; 25	KAN; 6	TOL; 13	6th	786	
2025	Nitro Motorsports	70	Toyota	DAY; 29	PHO	TAL; 16	KAN	CLT	MCH	BLN	ELK	LRP	DOV	IRP	IOW	GLN	ISF	MAD	DSF	BRI	SLM	KAN	TOL	87th	43	

==== ARCA Menards Series East ====
ARCA Menards Series East results
Year	Team	No.	Make	1	2	3	4	5	6	7	8	9	10	11	12	13	14	AMSEC	Pts	Ref
2017	Martin-McClure Racing	39	Toyota	NSM; 20	GRE	BRI	SBO	SBO	MEM	BLN	TMP	NHA	IOW	GLN	LGY	NJM	DOV	68th	24	
2022	Rette Jones Racing	30	Ford	NSM	FIF	DOV	NSV	IOW; 10	MLW; 14	BRI; 31								17th	127	
2024	Venturini Motorsports	22	Toyota	FIF	DOV; 20	NSV	FRS	IOW; 24	IRP; 13	MLW; 20	BRI; 25							19th	168	

==== ARCA Menards Series West ====
ARCA Menards Series West results
Year	Team	No.	Make	1	2	3	4	5	6	7	8	9	10	11	12	AMSWC	Pts	Ref
2021	Bill McAnally Racing	19	Toyota	PHO	SON	IRW; 15	CNS	IRW; 11	PIR	LVS; 22	AAS	PHO				25th	84	
2022	Rette Jones Racing	30	Ford	PHO; 30	IRW	KCR	PIR	SON	IRW	EVG	PIR	AAS	LVS	PHO		67th	14	
2024	Venturini Motorsports	22	Toyota	PHO; 15	KER	PIR	SON	IRW	IRW	SHA	TRI	MAD	AAS	KER	PHO	59th	29	

=== CARS Super Late Model Tour ===
(key)

CARS Super Late Model Tour results
Year	Team	No.	Make	1	2	3	4	5	6	7	8	9	CSLMTC	Pts	Ref
2018	N/A	4B	Toyota	MYB	NSH	ROU	HCY	BRI	AND	HCY; 28	ROU	SBO	51st	5	
2019	Kyle Busch Motorsports	51B	Toyota	SNM	HCY	NSH	MMS; 14	BRI	HCY	ROU	SBO		39th	19	
