= Max Siegel =

American businessman

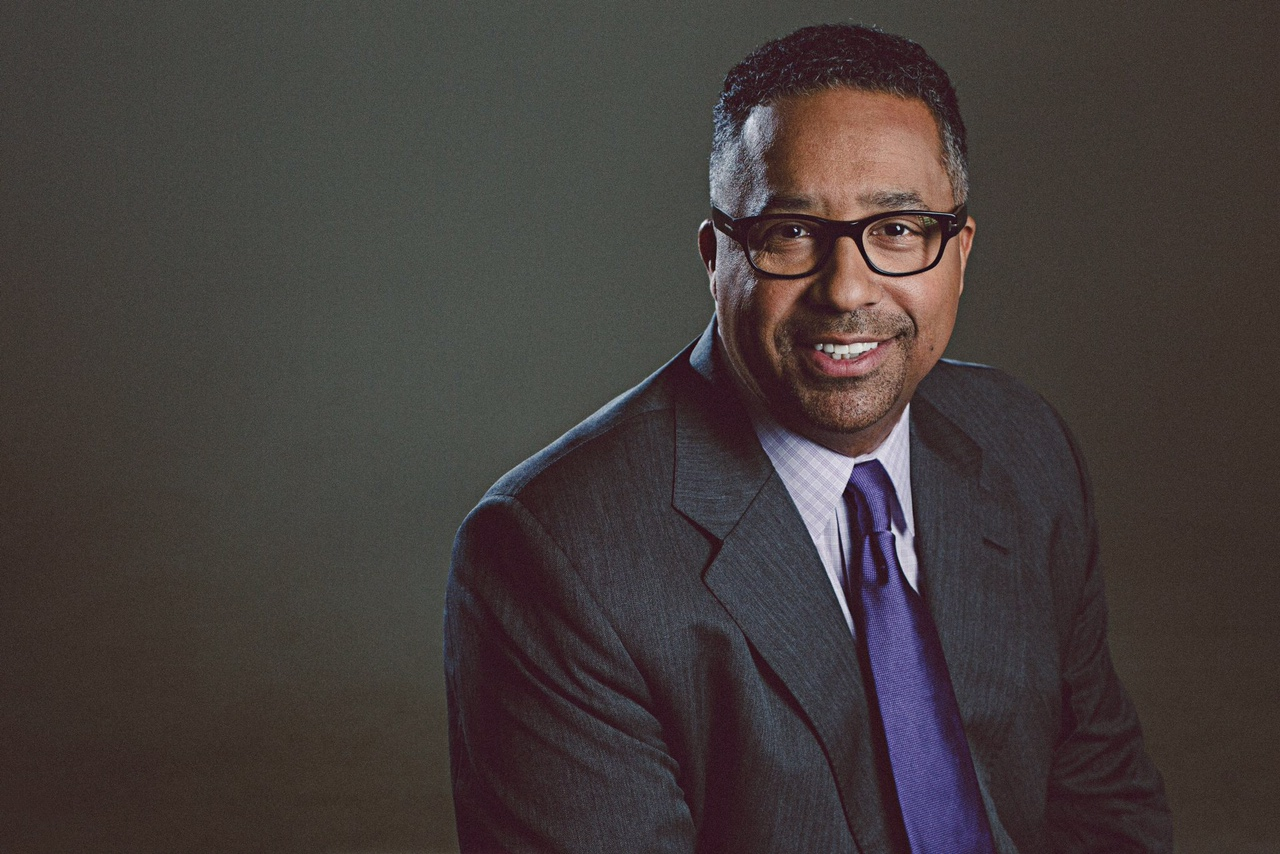
- Born: December 31, 1964 (age 61); Los Angeles, California, U.S.
- Education: Notre Dame (B.A.), (JD)
- Occupation: Chief Executive Officer of USA Track & Field

Max Siegel (born December 31, 1964) is an American corporate CEO, entertainment executive, attorney, and activist. He is the current Chief Executive Officer of USA Track & Field (USATF), the national governing body of Athletics in the United States. He is also the owner of Rev Racing, a development racing team in NASCAR for female and minority drivers.

== Education ==
Siegel attended the University of Notre Dame in Notre Dame, Indiana, where he earned a Bachelor of Arts degree in psychology and a Juris Doctor from the Notre Dame Law School. Siegel also served adjunct professorships in Sports & Entertainment Law (Indiana University School of Law-Indianapolis) and Law of the Music Business (Seton Hall University, Newark, New Jersey).

== Career ==
Siegel became CEO of USA Track & Field on May 1, 2012. During his tenure, the body has initiated a new business model, including new programs, particularly in the youth and elite athlete sections.

Siegel owns Max Siegel Inc. (MSI), a sports, marketing, entertainment, and media holding company. MSI's divisions include Revolution Racing, LLC (Rev Racing), a NASCAR-sanctioned and minority-owned race team; and Image Dei Music group, an urban label joint venture with Universal Music Group.

Siegel became President of Global Operations at Dale Earnhardt Inc. (DEI), becoming the highest-ranking African American executive in NASCAR.

Siegel is the owner of Rev Racing, a development program in the ARCA Menards Series and NASCAR Advance Auto Parts Weekly Series which participates in the NASCAR Driver Development Program, formerly Drive for Diversity, designed to increase minority and female involvement in auto racing. The team was founded in 2009 and has fielded cars for minority drivers including Daniel Suárez, Bubba Wallce and Kyle Larson.

Siegel held dual titles at Sony BMG, serving as both Senior Vice-President of Zomba Label Group and President of Zomba Gospel.

Siegel has been criticized for his setting an unusually high salary for himself, creating deals through USATF that financially benefit him and his associates, and having little consideration for athletes.

== Professional associations ==
Siegel is a member of the American, National, Indiana, and New York Bar Associations, Black Entertainment and Sports Lawyers Association, National Academy of Recording Arts and Sciences, Sigma Pi Phi and Kappa Alpha Psi.
