= Toni Breidinger =

American model and racing driver (born 1999)

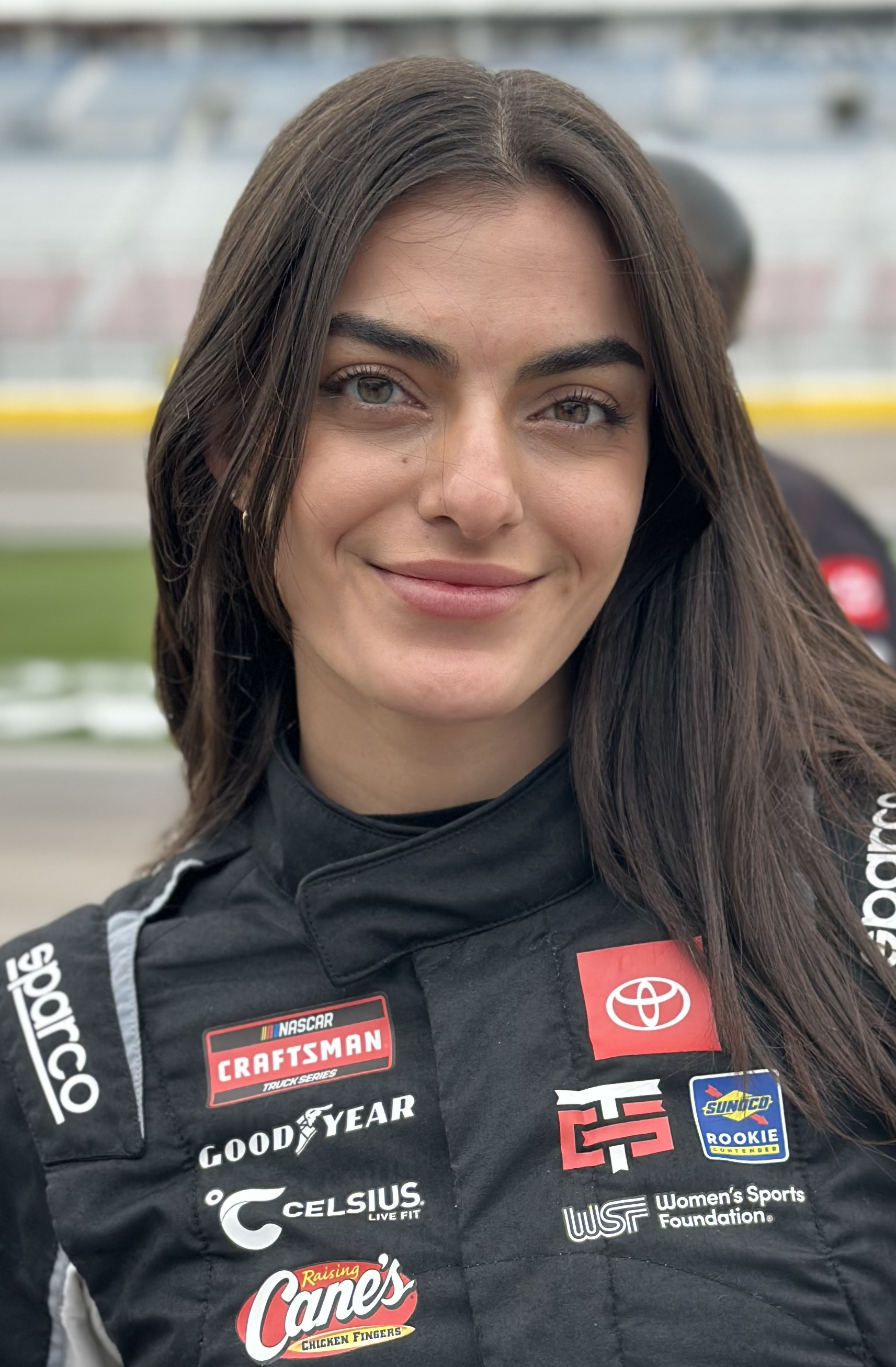
- Breidinger at Las Vegas Motor Speedway in 2025
- Born: Antoinette Marie Breidinger; July 14, 1999 (age 27); San Francisco, California, U.S.
- Achievements: 2016 USAC Western US Asphalt Midget Series Champion

NASCAR FedEx Freight Truck Series career
- 34 races run over 4 years
- 2026 position: 45th
- Best finish: 23rd (2025)
- First race: 2023 Heart of America 200 (Kansas)
- Last race: 2026 Zero Carbon Bioethanol 150 (Phoenix)
Wins	Top tens	Poles
0	0	0

ARCA Menards Series career
- 65 races run over 5 years
- Best finish: 4th (2024)
- First race: 2018 Herr's Potato Chips 200 (Madison)
- Last race: 2024 Owens Corning 200 (Toledo)
Wins	Top tens	Poles
0	27	0

ARCA Menards Series East career
- 13 races run over 3 years
- Best finish: 10th (2024)
- First race: 2022 Calypso Lemonade 150 (Iowa)
- Last race: 2024 Bush's Beans 200 (Bristol)
Wins	Top tens	Poles
0	5	0

ARCA Menards Series West career
- 6 races run over 4 years
- Best finish: 35th (2023)
- First race: 2021 General Tire 150 (Phoenix)
- Last race: 2024 General Tire 150 (Phoenix)
Wins	Top tens	Poles
0	1	0
- Statistics up to date as of November 6, 2026.

Antoinette Marie Breidinger (born July 14, 1999) is an American professional stock car racing driver and model. She last competed part-time in the NASCAR Craftsman Truck Series, driving the No. 26/27 Chevrolet Silverado RST for Rackley W.A.R., and the No. 20 Chevrolet Silverado RST for McAnally–Hilgemann Racing. Breidinger is the first female Arab-American driver to compete in NASCAR, being of Lebanese and German descent.

Raised in Hillsborough, California, Breidinger started competing in go-karts at the age of nine. After five years of go-kart racing, she moved to the USAC Western US Asphalt Midget Series at age 15 in 2014, winning the series championship two years later. Moving to North Carolina after graduating high school in 2017, she switched from open-wheel racing to stock car racing, racing primarily in late models for four years. Starting in 2021, she moved her focus towards the ARCA Racing Series, racing with Venturini Motorsports for most of her ARCA career. In her four seasons in ARCA, she amassed four top-fives and 27 top-tens. In 2025, she moved up full-time to the NASCAR Craftsman Truck Series with Tricon Garage.

== Early life and family background ==
Breidinger was born in San Francisco, California on July 14, 1999, and raised in the nearby city of Hillsborough. She is of German and Lebanese descent, with her father being German and her mother being Lebanese. Breidinger was born alongside a twin sister, Annie. She was educated at Mercy High School in Burlingame where she graduated in 2017. In an interview with The Athletic's Jeff Gluck, she stated that she loved her high school years, stating, "There’s so much diversity there. I grew up around so many different cultures and I was almost spoiled in a sense... I took it for granted... Now that I’m not living there, I’m like, 'Dang, I took it for granted.'"

== Early racing career ==
When she was nine years old, Breidinger started racing go-karts when her father took her and her twin sister to a go-kart school after he saw a newspaper advertisement for the school. After the duo attended several lessons, he bought the two go-karts for them to race. In an interview with Autoweek, she stated that her introduction to racing brought her a "sense of independence" that she wanted as a child. She continued racing go-karts until 2014. In 2011, she suffered the only major injury of her career when she and competitor Logan Sargeant crashed during a go-kart race at the CalSpeed Karting Center, with Breidinger being thrown out of the car and sustaining a broken arm. In 2014, she moved up to the USAC Western US Asphalt Midget Series at age 15, finishing runner-up in the series standings in her first season. After another runner-up standings finish the year after, she won the series championship in 2016, in the process becoming the winningest female driver in any USAC asphalt division at the time.

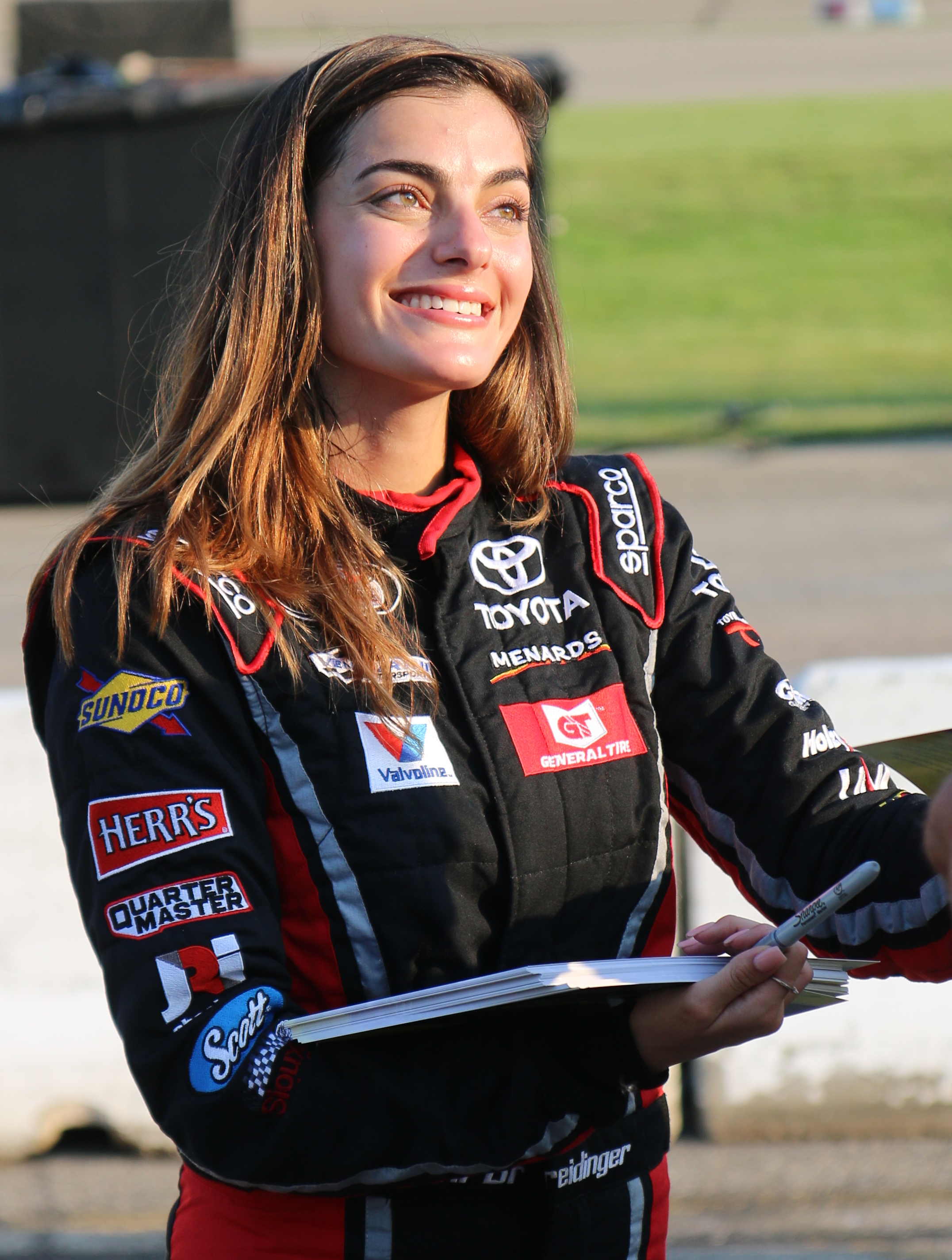
Breidinger at Madison International Speedway in 2018.

Initially wanting to pursue a career in open-wheel racing, she switched passions to stock car racing after watching late model races at Madera Speedway while she was racing midget cars. Although her father initially refused to let her race late models, he relented after she won the Western Midget Series championship in 2016. After graduating high school in 2017, she moved to Charlotte, North Carolina, to further pursue her racing career. In 2018, she made her debut in the ARCA Racing Series for Venturini Motorsports, finishing in tenth at Madison. She later made two additional starts for the team in that year's season. Early in 2019, she applied to join the W Series, an open-wheel and female-exclusive racing series, for their inaugural season. Although she was selected to make the initial top-60 round, she was not selected to be one of the 18 drivers for the season. Later that year, she joined GMS Racing's driver development program, racing late models for the team. In 2020, she raced a full season in the Carolina Pro Late Model Series, finishing fourth in the series standings.

== ARCA and NASCAR ==
=== 2021–2023 ===
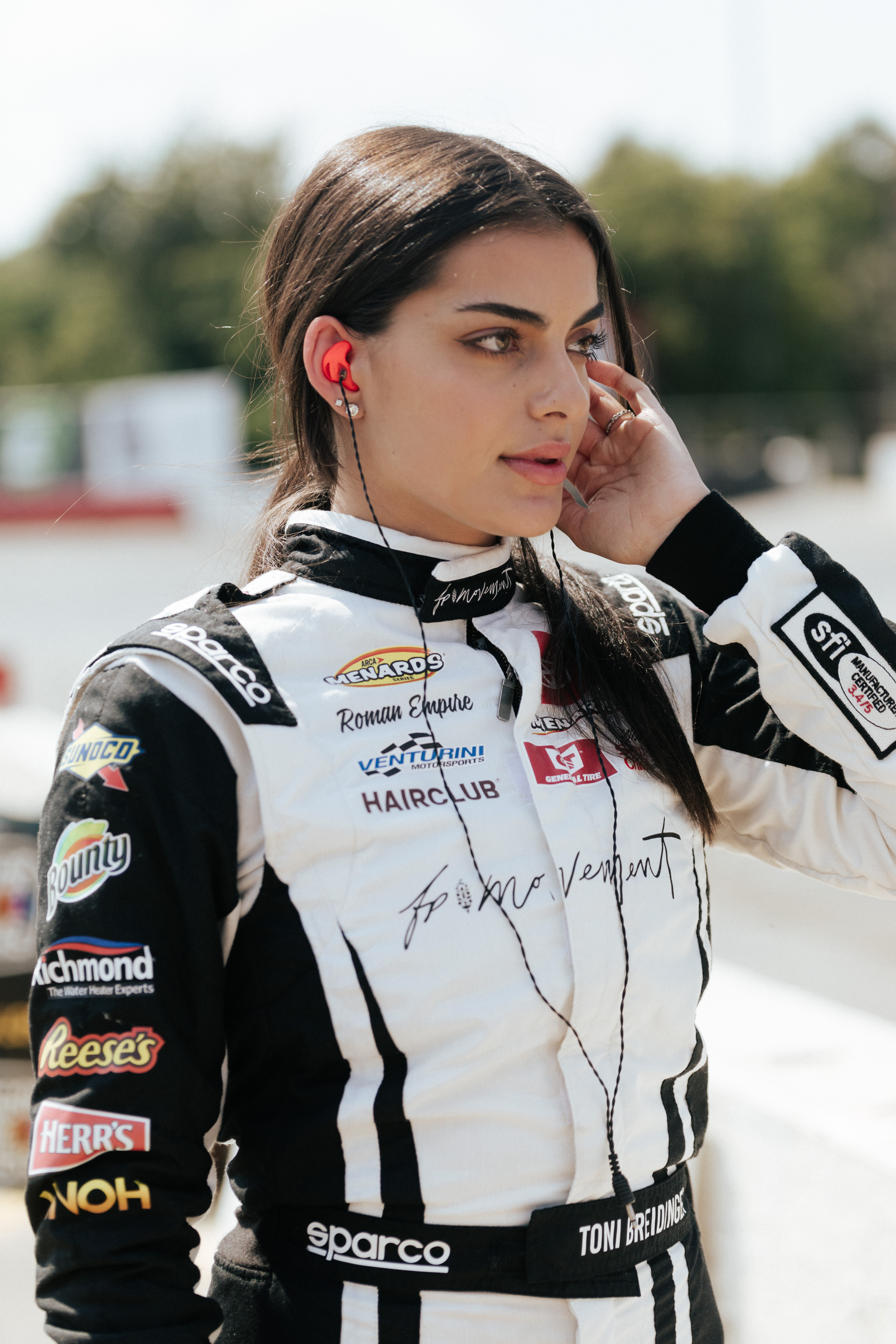
Breidinger in 2021

In 2021, Breidinger announced a part-time schedule in the ARCA Racing Series alongside the NASCAR Craftsman Truck Series for Young's Motorsports. In her debut with the team, she finished eighteenth, in the process becoming the first Arab-American woman to race in any national touring NASCAR series. However, after five ARCA starts with the team and no Truck Series starts, she moved to Venturini Motorsports midway through the season to race four additional ARCA races for them, joining the Toyota Racing Development (TRD) team.

The following year, Breidinger ran her first full-time season in ARCA for the series' 2022 season, staying with Venturini Motorsports. In the season-opener, she finished in the top-ten at Daytona. The season's opening ten rounds saw Breidinger achieve four top-ten finishes, only failing to finish once at Talladega. At the conclusion of her first full-time season, she finished sixth in the series standings, obtaining six total top-ten finishes and failing to finish four races throughout the season.

Breidinger remained at Venturini Motorsports for the 2023 season, scaling back to a part-time ARCA schedule and initially signing for 11 races. In addition to her ARCA schedule, she raced full-time for Nitro Motorsports in the inaugural season of the Toyota North America GR Cup, a touring car racing series exclusively limited to Toyota GR86 cars. According to Breidinger, she raced in the series to gain more road course experience. In the 2023 ARCA season, Breidinger was able to secure her first top-five finish in the series, earning four top-fives in the season and earning a best race finish of third at Kansas. Also in 2023, Breidinger made her debut in the NASCAR Craftsman Truck Series for Tricon Garage, finishing in fifteenth at the Heart of America 200. Afterwards, she raced two additional events for the team in the 2023 Truck season.

=== 2024–present ===
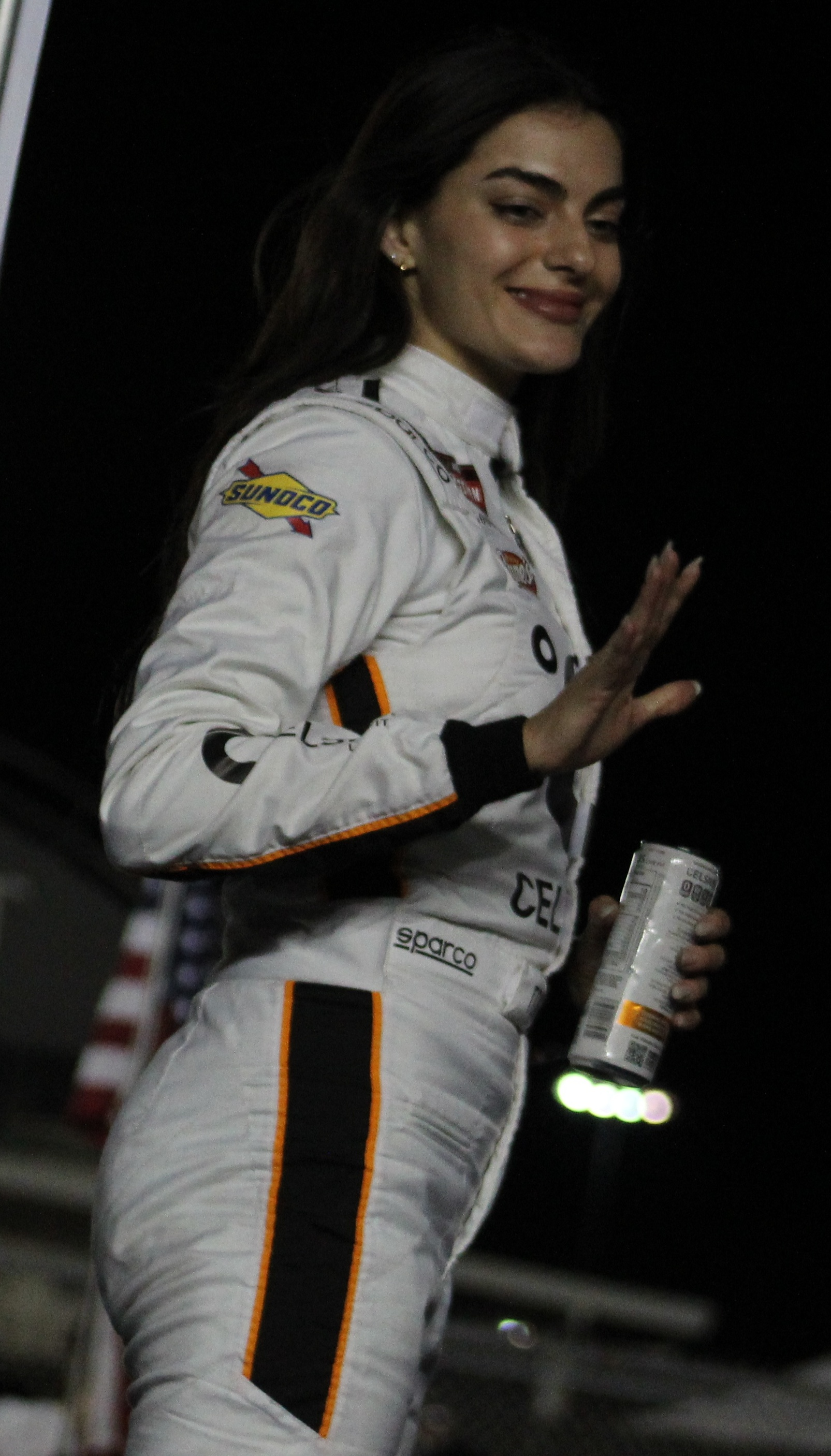
Breidinger in 2024

Breidinger returned to a full-time schedule for the 2024 season, remaining at Venturini Motorsports. In the season-opener race at Daytona, she wrecked out early in the race in a multi-car crash. She achieved eleven top-ten finishes throughout the 20-race season, with a best race finish of sixth. In addition, she failed to finish three additional races due to crashes. She finished the season with an average start of 12.0 and an average finish of 12.2, coming in fourth in the series standings. Also in 2024, Breidinger made a one-off Truck Series start for Tricon Garage, finishing in 27th for the series' season-opener.

Breidinger moved up full-time to the Truck Series for 2025, signing with Tricon Garage. She faced numerous struggles throughout her rookie Truck season. Through the first 15 races of the season, she achieved two top-20 finishes, with a best result of 18th at Rockingham, which placed her 22nd in the full-time driver's standings; only ahead of Frankie Muniz. However, she finished all but two of her first 15 races. In an interview given in May 2025, Breidinger stated that she experienced a "steep" learning curve racing trucks compared to ARCA cars, noting that "I knew the learning curve was going to be steep... But I don’t think I realized how much I was going to learn." In her final ten races, she failed to finish in four races, finishing no better than 24th in any of the ten races. At the 17th round at Watkins Glen, she was involved in a fiery incident after an engine failure. During the same weekend, she had several personal belongings stolen after someone broke into her car on August 8; the items were found a month later. She finished the year 23rd in the driver's standings, with an average start of 26.7 and an average finish of 25.4.

For the 2026 season, Breidinger remained in the Truck Series but transitioned to a part-time schedule, with Breidinger departing Tricon Garage. She is currently scheduled to compete in eight races for Rackley W.A.R. in the team's No. 27 entry. In her first attempt for the team, she failed to qualify for the season-opening race at Daytona, finishing the second slowest of all qualifiers; only ahead of Greg Van Alst.

== Non-racing ventures and personal life ==
Outside of racing, Breidinger pursues a modeling career to help support her racing career, describing it as "leverage". She is currently signed with modeling agency IMG Models. She has done modeling appearances for various publications, including Marie Claire Arabia, Glamour, Flaunt, Shape, and GQ. In 2025, she appeared on Sports Illustrated's Swimsuit Issue, becoming the first NASCAR driver to model for the publication. Speaking about her racing and modeling careers, she described herself as a Hannah Montana-like figure as "I have like these two different lives that I'm living and they're polar opposites". In a Nylon interview, she stated that she was inspired to go into modeling after watching Victoria's Secret fashion shows as a child, with Adriana Lima cited as her childhood idol.

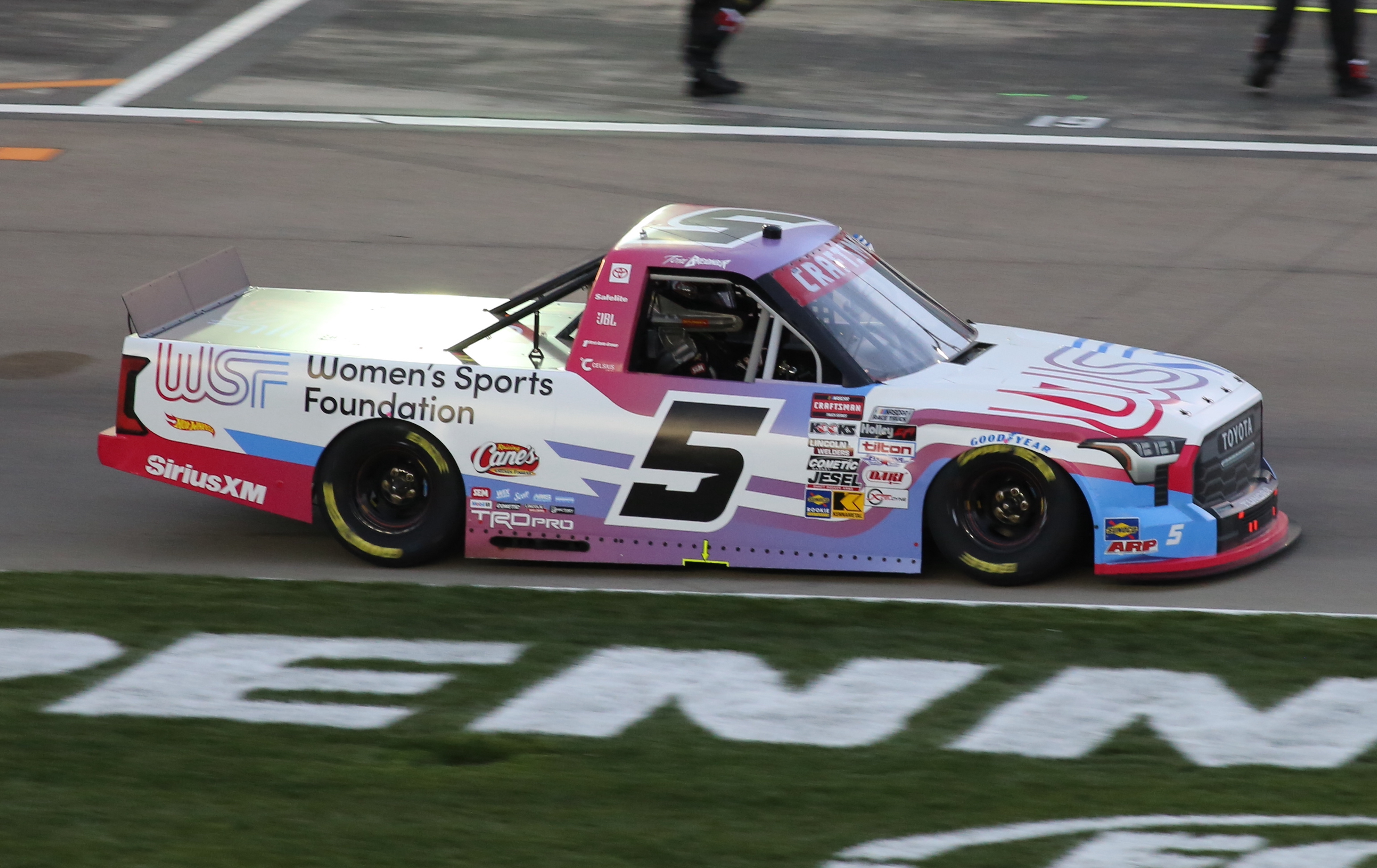
Breidinger's truck in 2025 at Las Vegas, sponsored by the Women's Sports Foundation. Breidinger is partners with the foundation and has appeared in various events for them.

Breidinger endorses the Women's Sports Foundation and has appeared in various galas and events for the foundation. In addition, throughout various races in her career, she has put the foundation on her race vehicles as a gesture of goodwill. Breidinger has also participated as a competitor with the American Cornhole League for their "Cornhole for a Cause" charity event. She is partnered with various companies; Breidinger has appeared on advertising billboards and cardboard cutouts for American chicken finger restaurant chain Raising Cane's as part of a national advertising campaign. She is also partnered with energy drink company Celsius, fuel company Sunoco, fashion house Coach, restaurant and entertainment chain Dave & Buster's, and Kendall Jenner-owned tequila brand 818 Tequila. In 2021, she made an appearance on American talk show The Ellen DeGeneres Show.

Breidinger has been vocal about her past struggles with body confidence. In 2022, while announcing a partnership to become a Victoria's Secret model, she stated that "growing up I struggled a lot with body confidence", adding that she focused on self-improvement of her physical and mental health the year prior.

== Motorsports career results ==
=== NASCAR ===
(key) (Bold;– Pole position awarded by qualifying time. Italics;– Pole position earned by points standings or practice time. *;– Most laps led.)

==== Craftsman Truck Series ====
NASCAR Craftsman Truck Series results
Year	Team	No.	Make	1	2	3	4	5	6	7	8	9	10	11	12	13	14	15	16	17	18	19	20	21	22	23	24	25	NCTC	Pts	Ref
2023	Tricon Garage	1	Toyota	DAY	LVS	ATL	COA	TEX	BRD	MAR	KAN; 15	DAR	NWS	CLT	GTW; 24	NSH; 17	MOH	POC	RCH	IRP	MLW	KAN	BRI	TAL	HOM	PHO			38th	55	
2024	Tricon Garage	1	Toyota	DAY; 27	ATL	LVS	BRI	COA	MAR	TEX	KAN	DAR	NWS	CLT	GTW	NSH	POC	IRP	RCH	MLW	BRI	KAN	TAL	HOM	MAR	PHO			69th	10	
2025	Tricon Garage	5	Toyota	DAY; 28	ATL; 24	LVS; 21	HOM; 26	MAR; 24	BRI; 25	CAR; 18	TEX; 26	KAN; 20	NWS; 21	CLT; 30	NSH; 30	MCH; 22	POC; 22	LRP; 29	IRP; 26	GLN; 29	RCH; 24	DAR; 24	BRI; 26	NHA; 25	ROV; 30	TAL; 33	MAR; 26	PHO; 25	23rd	291	
2026	Rackley W.A.R.	27	Chevy	DAY; DNQ	ATL	STP	DAR	CAR	BRI	TEX; 18		DOV; 26	CLT	NSH; DNQ	MCH	COR	LRP	NWS	IRP; 25	RCH									45th	59	
2026	McAnally–Hilgemann Racing	20	Chevy								GLN; DNQ														PHO; 31	TAL	MAR	HOM	45th	59	
2026	Rackley W.A.R.	26	Chevy																		NHA; QL^{†}	BRI	KAN; 26	CLT					45th	59	
^{†} – Qualified but replaced by Dawson Sutton

^{*} Season still in progress
^{1} Ineligible for series points

=== ARCA Menards Series ===
(key) (Bold;– Pole position awarded by qualifying time. Italics;– Pole position earned by points standings or practice time. *;– Most laps led.)

ARCA Menards Series results
Year	Team	No.	Make	1	2	3	4	5	6	7	8	9	10	11	12	13	14	15	16	17	18	19	20	AMSC	Pts	Ref
2018	Venturini Motorsports	55	Toyota	DAY	NSH	SLM	TAL	TOL	CLT	POC	MCH	MAD; 10		CHI; 18	IOW	ELK	POC	ISF	BLN	DSF	SLM	IRP	KAN	42nd	490	
2018	Venturini Motorsports	20	Toyota										GTW; 12											42nd	490	
2021	Young's Motorsports	02	Chevy	DAY; 18	PHO; 30	TAL; 12	KAN; 12	TOL	CLT; 20	MOH	POC	ELK	BLN	IOW										13th	258	
2021	Venturini Motorsports	25	Toyota												WIN; 9	GLN	MCH	ISF; 9	MLW	DSF; 12	BRI	SLM		13th	258	
2021	Venturini Motorsports	55	Toyota																				KAN; 16	13th	258	
2022	Venturini Motorsports	25	Toyota	DAY; 9	PHO; 15	TAL; 24	KAN; 10	CLT; 11	IOW; 11	BLN; 9	ELK; 12	MOH; 13	POC; 10	IRP; 17	MCH; 11	GLN; 14	ISF; 18	MLW; 12	DSF; 13	KAN; 9	BRI; 16	SLM; 8	TOL; 14	6th	824	
2023	Venturini Motorsports	55	Toyota	DAY; 23	PHO; 22	TAL; 12	KAN; 11	CLT; 12		ELK; 9	MOH		POC; 6	MCH	IRP; 9	GLN	ISF	MLW	DSF	KAN; 3	BRI; 12			9th	489	
2023	Venturini Motorsports	25	Toyota						BLN; 5			IOW; 5												9th	489	
2023	Venturini Motorsports	15	Toyota																			SLM; 4	TOL	9th	489	
2024	Venturini Motorsports	25	Toyota	DAY; 37	PHO; 9	TAL; 10	DOV; 15	KAN; 10	CLT; 12	IOW; 8	MOH; 7	BLN; 6	IRP; 24	SLM; 16	ELK; 7	MCH; 8	ISF; 6	MLW; 11	DSF; 9	GLN; 17	BRI; 12	KAN; 12	TOL; 7	4th	837	

==== ARCA Menards Series East ====
ARCA Menards Series East results
Year	Team	No.	Make	1	2	3	4	5	6	7	8	AMSEC	Pts	Ref
2022	Venturini Motorsports	25	Toyota	NSM	FIF	DOV	NSV	IOW; 11	MLW; 12	BRI; 16		16th	143	
2023	Venturini Motorsports	55	Toyota	FIF	DOV; 7	NSV	FRS		IRP; 9	MLW	BRI; 12	18th	143	
2023	Venturini Motorsports	25	Toyota					IOW; 5				18th	143	
2024	Venturini Motorsports	25	Toyota	FIF	DOV; 15	NSV		IOW; 8	IRP; 24	MLW; 11	BRI; 12	10th	240	
2024	Venturini Motorsports	55	Toyota				FRS; 4					10th	240	

==== ARCA Menards Series West ====
ARCA Menards Series West results
Year	Team	No.	Make	1	2	3	4	5	6	7	8	9	10	11	12	AMSWC	Pts	Ref
2021	Young's Motorsports	02	Chevy	PHO; 30	SON	IRW	CNS	IRW	PIR	LVS	AAS					54th	14	
2021	Venturini Motorsports	55	Toyota									PHO; 27				54th	14	
2022	Venturini Motorsports	25	Toyota	PHO; 15	IRW	KCR	PIR	SON	IRW	EVG	PIR	AAS	LVS	PHO		58th	29	
2023	Venturini Motorsports	55	Toyota	PHO; 22	IRW	KCR	PIR	SON	IRW	SHA	EVG	AAS	LVS	MAD		35th	55	
2023	Venturini Motorsports	25	Toyota												PHO; 11	35th	55	
2024	Venturini Motorsports	25	Toyota	PHO; 9	KER	PIR	SON	IRW	IRW	SHA	TRI	MAD	AAS	KER	PHO	49th	35	

=== CARS Super Late Model Tour ===
(key)

CARS Super Late Model Tour results
Year	Team	No.	Make	1	2	3	4	5	6	7	8	CSLMTC	Pts	Ref
2019	GMS Racing	21	Chevy	SNM	HCY	NSH	MMS; 15	BRI	HCY	ROU	SBO	43rd	18	

=== IHRA Pro Late Model Series ===
(key) (Bold – Pole position awarded by qualifying time. Italics – Pole position earned by points standings or practice time. * – Most laps led. ** – All laps led.)

IHRA Pro Late Model Series
Year	Team	No.	Make	1	2	3	ISCSS	Pts	Ref
2026	Dexter Canipe Racing	5	Chevy	DUB; 7	CDL	AND	N/A	0	

Sporting positions
Preceded by Dylan Nobile	USAC Western US Asphalt Midget Series; 2016	Succeeded by Jesse Love
