= 2022 Shore Lunch 200 =

20th race of the 2022 ARCA Menards Series

Race details
- Race 20 of 20 of the 2022 ARCA Menards Series
- Date: October 8, 2022
- Official name: 82nd Annual Shore Lunch 200
- Location: Toledo Speedway, Toledo, Ohio
- Course: Permanent racing facility
- Course length: 0.5 miles (0.804 km)
- Distance: 200 laps, 100 mi (160.934 km)
- Scheduled distance: 200 laps, 100 mi (160.934 km)
- Average speed: 75.188 mph (121.003 km/h)

Pole position
Driver	Jesse Love	Venturini Motorsports
- Time: 15.847

Most laps led
Driver	Jesse Love	Venturini Motorsports
- Laps: 192

Winner
No. 18	Sammy Smith	Kyle Busch Motorsports

Television in the United States
- Network: MAVTV
- Announcers: Krista Voda, Jim Tretow

Radio in the United States
- Radio: ARCA Racing Network

The 2022 Shore Lunch 200 was the 20th and final stock car race of the 2022 ARCA Menards Series season, and the 82nd iteration of the event. The race was held on Saturday, October 8, 2022, in Toledo, Ohio at Toledo Speedway, a 0.5 mile (0.804 km) permanent oval-shaped racetrack. The race took the scheduled 200 laps to complete. In an exciting finish with four laps to go, Sammy Smith, driving for Kyle Busch Motorsports, would steal the win after moving Jesse Love out of the way with two laps to go. This was Smith's sixth career ARCA Menards Series win, along with his sixth of the season. Jesse Love would dominate the entire race, leading 192 laps.

Nick Sanchez, driving for Rev Racing, would claim the 2022 ARCA Menards Series championship, finishing 14 points ahead of second position, which was Daniel Dye. Sanchez would become the first driver born in Hispanic ancestry to win the championship.

== Background ==
Toledo Speedway is a half-mile paved oval racetrack located in Toledo, Ohio, United States. It is owned jointly by Roy Mott and ARCA President Ron Drager. It is operated by ARCA and run as the sister track to Flat Rock Speedway in Flat Rock, Michigan.

=== Entry list ===
- (R) denotes rookie driver

#	Driver	Team	Make	Sponsor
0	Nate Moeller	Wayne Peterson Racing	Toyota	GreatRailing.com
01	Tim Monroe	Fast Track Racing	Ford	Fast Track Racing
2	Nick Sanchez	Rev Racing	Chevrolet	Gainbridge, Max Siegel Inc.
03	Alex Clubb	Clubb Racing Inc.	Ford	Clubb Racing Inc.
06	A. J. Moyer	Wayne Peterson Racing	Ford	Rivers Edge Cottages & RV Park
6	Rajah Caruth (R)	Rev Racing	Chevrolet	Max Siegel Inc.
10	Tony Cosentino	Fast Track Racing	Toyota	The Gutter Team
11	Brandon Varney	Fast Track Racing	Toyota	Franklin Park Lincoln
12	Zachary Tinkle	Fast Track Racing	Ford	Racing for Rescues, Double H Ranch
15	Landon Pembelton	Venturini Motorsports	Toyota	Mobil 1
17	Taylor Gray	David Gilliland Racing	Ford	David Gilliland Racing
18	Sammy Smith (R)	Kyle Busch Motorsports	Toyota	TMC Transportation
20	Jesse Love (R)	Venturini Motorsports	Toyota	Yahoo!
25	Toni Breidinger (R)	Venturini Motorsports	Toyota	Pit Viper Sunglasses
30	Amber Balcaen (R)	Rette Jones Racing	Ford	ICON Direct
35	Greg Van Alst	Greg Van Alst Motorsports	Ford	CB Fabricating
40	Matthew Gould	Niece Motorsports	Chevrolet	Worldwide Express
42	Amber Slagle	Cook Racing Technologies	Toyota	MMI Services, Sunwest Construction
43	Daniel Dye (R)	GMS Racing	Chevrolet	Race to Stop Suicide
44	Grant Enfinger	GMS Racing	Chevrolet	Champion Power Equipment
48	Brad Smith	Brad Smith Motorsports	Chevrolet	PSST...Copraya Websites
55	Morgen Baird	Venturini Motorsports	Toyota	Venturini Motorsports
65	Jeffery MacZink	MacZink Racing	Toyota	Parkway Services, Syncon Performance Floors
73	Andy Jankowiak	Jankowiak Motorsports	Toyota	Automotive Consultants
Official entry list

== Practice ==
The only 45-minute practice session was held on Saturday, October 8, at 11:45 AM EST. Sammy Smith, driving for Kyle Busch Motorsports, would set the fastest time in the session, with a lap of 15.989, and an average speed of 112.577 mph (181.175 km/h).

Pos.	#	Driver	Team	Make	Time	Speed
1	18	Sammy Smith (R)	Kyle Busch Motorsports	Toyota	15.989	112.577
2	43	Daniel Dye (R)	GMS Racing	Chevrolet	15.999	112.570
3	20	Jesse Love (R)	Venturini Motorsports	Toyota	16.062	112.066
Full practice results

== Qualifying ==
Qualifying was held on Saturday, October 8, at 1:30 PM EST. The qualifying system used is a single-car, two-lap system with only one round. Whoever sets the fastest time in the round wins the pole. Jesse Love, driving for Venturini Motorsports, would score the pole for the race, with a lap of 15.847, and an average speed of 113.586 mph (182.799 km/h).

Pos.	#	Name	Team	Make	Time	Speed
1	20	Jesse Love (R)	Venturini Motorsports	Toyota	15.847	113.586
2	43	Daniel Dye (R)	GMS Racing	Chevrolet	15.982	112.627
3	44	Grant Enfinger	GMS Racing	Chevrolet	15.997	112.521
4	17	Taylor Gray	David Gilliland Racing	Ford	16.012	112.416
5	18	Sammy Smith (R)	Kyle Busch Motorsports	Toyota	16.134	111.566
6	15	Landon Pembelton	Venturini Motorsports	Toyota	16.151	111.448
7	30	Amber Balcaen (R)	Rette Jones Racing	Ford	16.233	110.885
8	2	Nick Sanchez	Rev Racing	Chevrolet	16.241	110.831
9	25	Toni Breidinger (R)	Venturini Motorsports	Toyota	16.366	109.984
10	6	Rajah Caruth (R)	Rev Racing	Chevrolet	16.383	109.870
11	11	Brandon Varney	Fast Track Racing	Toyota	16.387	109.843
12	40	Matthew Gould	Niece Motorsports	Chevrolet	16.484	109.197
13	73	Andy Jankowiak	Jankowiak Motorsports	Toyota	16.487	109.177
14	35	Greg Van Alst	Greg Van Alst Motorsports	Ford	16.537	108.847
15	42	Amber Slagle	Cook Racing Technologies	Toyota	16.832	106.939
16	10	Tony Cosentino	Fast Track Racing	Toyota	16.943	106.239
17	12	Zachary Tinkle	Fast Track Racing	Ford	17.460	103.093
18	01	Tim Monroe	Fast Track Racing	Ford	18.554	97.014
19	06	A. J. Moyer	Wayne Peterson Racing	Ford	18.884	95.319
20	48	Brad Smith	Brad Smith Motorsports	Chevrolet	19.144	94.024
21	03	Alex Clubb	Clubb Racing Inc.	Ford	19.586	91.902
22	0	Nate Moeller	Wayne Peterson Racing	Toyota	21.890	82.229
23	55	Morgen Baird	Venturini Motorsports	Toyota	-	-
24	65	Jeffery MacZink	MacZink Racing	Toyota	-	-
Official qualifying results

== Race results ==
Fin.	St	#	Driver	Team	Make	Laps	Led	Status	Pts
1	5	18	Sammy Smith (R)	Kyle Busch Motorsports	Toyota	200	3	Running	47
2	1	20	Jesse Love (R)	Venturini Motorsports	Toyota	200	192	Running	45
3	3	44	Grant Enfinger	GMS Racing	Chevrolet	200	1	Running	42
4	4	17	Taylor Gray	David Gilliland Racing	Ford	200	0	Running	40
5	10	6	Rajah Caruth (R)	Rev Racing	Chevrolet	200	0	Running	39
6	8	2	Nick Sanchez	Rev Racing	Chevrolet	200	2	Running	39
7	6	15	Landon Pembelton	Venturini Motorsports	Toyota	200	0	Running	37
8	12	40	Matt Gould	Niece Motorsports	Chevrolet	199	0	Running	36
9	14	35	Greg Van Alst	Greg Van Alst Motorsports	Ford	199	0	Running	35
10	7	30	Amber Balcaen (R)	Rette Jones Racing	Ford	199	0	Running	34
11	13	73	Andy Jankowiak	Jankowiak Motorsports	Ford	199	0	Running	33
12	11	11	Brandon Varney	Fast Track Racing	Toyota	199	0	Running	32
13	15	42	Amber Slagle	Cook Racing Technologies	Toyota	198	0	Running	31
14	9	25	Toni Breidinger (R)	Venturini Motorsports	Toyota	195	0	Running	30
15	20	48	Brad Smith	Brad Smith Motorsports	Chevrolet	187	0	Running	29
16	19	06	A. J. Moyer	Wayne Peterson Racing	Ford	180	0	Running	28
17	21	03	Alex Clubb	Clubb Racing Inc.	Ford	180	0	Running	27
18	2	43	Daniel Dye (R)	GMS Racing	Chevrolet	163	2	Running	27
19	24	65	Jeffery MacZink	MacZink Racing	Toyota	94	0	Accident	25
20	16	10	Tony Cosentino	Fast Track Racing	Toyota	86	0	Electrical	24
21	17	12	Zachary Tinkle	Fast Track Racing	Ford	6	0	Radiator	23
22	18	01	Tim Monroe	Fast Track Racing	Ford	3	0	Transmission	22
23	22	0	Nate Moeller	Wayne Peterson Racing	Toyota	2	0	Handling	21
24	23	55	Morgen Baird	Venturini Motorsports	Toyota	0	0	Did Not Start	20
Official race results

== Standings after the race ==
Drivers' Championship standings

	Pos	Driver	Points
	1	Nick Sanchez	970
	2	Daniel Dye	956 (-14)
	3	Rajah Caruth	932 (-38)
1	4	Sammy Smith	851 (-119)
1	5	Greg Van Alst	841 (-129)
	6	Toni Breidinger	824 (-146)
	7	Amber Balcaen	774 (-196)
	8	Brad Smith	709 (-261)
2	9	Zachary Tinkle	619 (-351)
1	10	Taylor Gray	606 (-364)

- Note: Only the first 10 positions are included for the driver standings.

Previous race: 2022 Herr's Snacks 200	ARCA Menards Series; 2022 season	Next race: 2023 BRANDT 200
