= 2022 Bush's Beans 200 =

18th race of the 2022 ARCA Menards Series

Race details
- Race 18 of 20 of the 2022 ARCA Menards Series; Race 7 of 7 of the 2022 ARCA Menards Series East; Race 10 of 10 of the 2022 Sioux Chief Showdown
- Date: September 15, 2022
- Official name: 3rd Annual Bush's Beans 200
- Location: Bristol Motor Speedway, Bristol, Tennessee
- Course: Permanent racing facility
- Course length: 0.533 miles (0.858 km)
- Distance: 200 laps, 106.6 mi (171.556 km)
- Scheduled distance: 200 laps, 106.6 mi (171.556 km)
- Average speed: 68.248 mph (109.835 km/h)

Pole position
Driver	Sammy Smith	Kyle Busch Motorsports
- Time: 15.171

Most laps led
Driver	Sammy Smith	Kyle Busch Motorsports
- Laps: 189

Winner
No. 18	Sammy Smith	Kyle Busch Motorsports

Television in the United States
- Network: Fox Sports 1
- Announcers: Jamie Little and Phil Parsons

Radio in the United States
- Radio: Motor Racing Network

The 2022 Bush's Beans 200 was the 18th stock car race of the 2022 ARCA Menards Series season, the 7th and final race of the 2022 ARCA Menards Series East, the 10th and final race of the 2022 Sioux Chief Showdown and the 2nd iteration of the event. The race was held on Thursday, September 15, 2022, in Bristol, Tennessee at Bristol Motor Speedway, a 0.533 mile (0.858 km) permanent oval shaped racetrack. The race took the scheduled 200 laps to complete. Sammy Smith, driving for Kyle Busch Motorsports, dominated the entire race, leading 189 laps for his fourth career ARCA Menards Series win, and his eighth career ARCA Menards Series East win, and his ninth win overall this season. To fill out the podium, Brandon Jones, driving for Joe Gibbs Racing, and Taylor Gray, driving for David Gilliland Racing, finished 2nd and 3rd, respectively.

After Taylor Gray spun during the middle of the race, Smith would claim the 2022 ARCA Menards Series East championship, along with the 2022 Sioux Chief Showdown championship. Although Gray ended up finishing in the third spot, he was too many points behind Smith to claim the title.

== Background ==
Bristol Motor Speedway, formerly known as Bristol International Raceway and Bristol Raceway, is a NASCAR short track venue located in Bristol, Tennessee. Constructed in 1960, it held its first NASCAR race on July 30, 1961. Bristol is among the most popular tracks on the NASCAR schedule because of its distinct features, which include extraordinarily steep banking, an all-concrete surface, two pit roads, and stadium-like seating. It has also been named one of the loudest NASCAR tracks. The track is billed as the "World's Fastest Half-Mile", even though that designation technically belongs to the Volusia Speedway Park dirt track.

=== Entry list ===
- (R) denotes rookie driver

#	Driver	Team	Make	Sponsor
01	Stephanie Moyer	Fast Track Racing	Toyota	Harry's U Pull It
1	Jake Finch	Phoenix Racing	Toyota	Phoenix Construction
02	Leland Honeyman (R)	Young's Motorsports	Chevrolet	LH Waterfront Construction
2	Nick Sanchez	Rev Racing	Chevrolet	Gainbridge, Max Siegel Inc.
03	Alex Clubb	Clubb Racing Inc.	Ford	Fresh Fin, Bub'n Muthas, Royster Apparel
3	Mason Diaz	Mullins Racing	Toyota	Solid Rock Carriers, Crow Wing Recycling
06	A. J. Moyer	Wayne Peterson Racing	Ford	River's Edge Cottages & RV Park
6	Rajah Caruth (R)	Rev Racing	Chevrolet	Max Siegel Inc.
10	Tim Monroe	Fast Track Racing	Toyota	Fast Track Racing
11	Zachary Tinkle	Fast Track Racing	Ford	Racing for Rescues
12	D. L. Wilson	Fast Track Racing	Chevrolet	Heart O' Texas Speedway
15	Parker Chase	Venturini Motorsports	Toyota	Ontivity
17	Taylor Gray	David Gilliland Racing	Ford	Ford Performance
18	Sammy Smith (R)	Kyle Busch Motorsports	Toyota	TMC Transportation
20	Jesse Love (R)	Venturini Motorsports	Toyota	Crescent Tools
23	Connor Mosack	Bret Holmes Racing	Chevrolet	Nic Tailor Custom Underwear
25	Toni Breidinger (R)	Venturini Motorsports	Toyota	Pit Viper Sunglasses
30	Amber Balcaen (R)	Rette Jones Racing	Ford	ICON Direct
35	Greg Van Alst	Greg Van Alst Motorsports	Ford	CB Fabricating
42	Christian Rose	Cook Racing Technologies	Chevrolet	West Virginia Tourism #AlmostHeaven
43	Daniel Dye (R)	GMS Racing	Chevrolet	Champion Container
44	Ron Vandermeir Jr.	Vanco Racing	Ford	Mak Rak Repair, Finish Line Flooring
48	Brad Smith	Brad Smith Motorsports	Chevrolet	PSST...Copraya Websites
49	Ashton Higgins	ALH Motorsports	Toyota	Leapfrog Landscaping
51	Andrés Pérez de Lara	David Gilliland Racing	Ford	Ford Performance
55	Conner Jones	Venturini Motorsports	Toyota	Jones Utilities
60	Michael Lira	Josh Williams Motorsports	Chevrolet	ACL Remodeling LLC, Girem Tile
73	Andy Jankowiak	Jankowiak Motorsports	Toyota	Planter Box
81	Brandon Jones	Joe Gibbs Racing	Toyota	Homewerks, Menards
91	Justin Carroll	TC Motorsports	Toyota	Carrolls Automotive
95	Tanner Arms	MAN Motorsports	Toyota	Cedar City RV
Official entry list

== Practice ==
The only 50-minute practice session was held on Thursday, September 15, at 2:30 PM EST. Sammy Smith, driving for Kyle Busch Motorsports, was the fastest in the session, with a lap of 15.237, and an average speed of 125.930 mph (202.665 km/h).

Pos.	#	Driver	Team	Make	Time	Speed
1	18	Sammy Smith (R)	Kyle Busch Motorsports	Toyota	15.237	125.930
2	17	Taylor Gray	David Gilliland Racing	Ford	15.255	125.782
3	20	Jesse Love (R)	Venturini Motorsports	Toyota	15.418	124.452
Full practice results

== Qualifying ==
Qualifying was held on Thursday, September 15, at 3:30 PM EST. The qualifying system used is a multiple-car, multiple-lap system with only one round. Whoever sets the fastest time in the round wins the pole. Sammy Smith, driving for Kyle Busch Motorsports, scored the pole for the race, with a lap of 15.171, and an average speed of 126.478 mph (203.547 km/h).

Pos.	#	Name	Team	Make	Time	Speed
1	18	Sammy Smith (R)	Kyle Busch Motorsports	Toyota	15.171	126.478
2	81	Brandon Jones	Joe Gibbs Racing	Toyota	15.222	126.054
3	17	Taylor Gray	David Gilliland Racing	Ford	15.229	125.996
4	20	Jesse Love (R)	Venturini Motorsports	Toyota	15.385	124.719
5	23	Connor Mosack	Bret Holmes Racing	Chevrolet	15.393	124.654
6	43	Daniel Dye (R)	GMS Racing	Chevrolet	15.400	124.597
7	6	Rajah Caruth (R)	Rev Racing	Chevrolet	15.468	124.050
8	2	Nick Sanchez	Rev Racing	Chevrolet	15.474	124.002
9	15	Parker Chase	Venturini Motorsports	Toyota	15.483	123.929
10	3	Mason Diaz	Mullins Racing	Toyota	15.501	123.786
11	1	Jake Finch	Phoenix Racing	Toyota	15.555	123.356
12	55	Conner Jones	Venturini Motorsports	Toyota	15.662	122.513
13	25	Toni Breidinger (R)	Venturini Motorsports	Toyota	15.664	122.497
14	30	Amber Balcaen (R)	Rette Jones Racing	Ford	15.664	122.497
15	91	Justin Carroll	TC Motorsports	Toyota	15.713	122.115
16	51	Andrés Pérez de Lara	David Gilliland Racing	Ford	15.757	121.774
17	73	Andy Jankowiak	Jankowiak Motorsports	Toyota	15.823	121.267
18	49	Ashton Higgins	ALH Motorsports	Toyota	15.825	121.251
19	35	Greg Van Alst	Greg Van Alst Motorsports	Ford	15.833	121.190
20	95	Tanner Arms	MAN Motorsports	Toyota	15.834	121.182
21	44	Ron Vandermeir Jr.	Vanco Racing	Ford	15.930	120.452
22	42	Christian Rose	Cook Racing Technologies	Chevrolet	16.079	119.336
23	60	Michael Lira	Josh Williams Motorsports	Chevrolet	16.254	118.051
24	11	Zachary Tinkle	Fast Track Racing	Ford	16.617	115.472
25	01	Stephanie Moyer	Fast Track Racing	Toyota	16.915	113.438
26	12	D. L. Wilson	Fast Track Racing	Chevrolet	17.198	111.571
27	10	Tim Monroe	Fast Track Racing	Toyota	17.483	109.752
28	48	Brad Smith	Brad Smith Motorsports	Chevrolet	18.510	103.663
29	02	Leland Honeyman (R)	Young's Motorsports	Chevrolet	-	-
30	03	Alex Clubb	Clubb Racing Inc.	Ford	-	-
31	06	A. J. Moyer	Wayne Peterson Racing	Ford	-	-
Official qualifying results

== Race results ==
Fin.	St	#	Driver	Team	Make	Laps	Led	Status	Pts
1	1	18	Sammy Smith (R)	Kyle Busch Motorsports	Toyota	200	189	Running	49
2	2	81	Brandon Jones	Joe Gibbs Racing	Toyota	200	11	Running	43
3	3	17	Taylor Gray	David Gilliland Racing	Ford	200	0	Running	41
4	7	6	Rajah Caruth (R)	Rev Racing	Chevrolet	200	0	Running	40
5	6	43	Daniel Dye (R)	GMS Racing	Chevrolet	200	0	Running	39
6	9	15	Parker Chase	Venturini Motorsports	Toyota	200	0	Running	38
7	16	51	Andrés Peréz de Lara	David Gilliland Racing	Ford	200	0	Running	37
8	17	73	Andy Jankowiak	Jankowiak Motorsports	Toyota	200	0	Running	36
9	5	23	Connor Mosack	Bret Holmes Racing	Chevrolet	200	0	Running	35
10	4	20	Jesse Love (R)	Venturini Motorsports	Toyota	200	0	Running	34
11	21	44	Ron Vandermeir Jr.	Vanco Racing	Ford	200	0	Running	33
12	8	2	Nick Sanchez	Rev Racing	Chevrolet	199	0	Running	32
13	11	1	Jake Finch	Phoenix Racing	Toyota	199	0	Running	31
14	19	35	Greg Van Alst	Greg Van Alst Motorsports	Ford	198	0	Running	30
15	20	95	Tanner Arms	MAN Motorsports	Toyota	197	0	Running	29
16	13	25	Toni Breidinger (R)	Venturini Motorsports	Toyota	194	0	Running	28
17	23	60	Michael Lira	Josh Williams Motorsports	Chevrolet	194	0	Running	27
18	26	12	D. L. Wilson	Fast Track Racing	Chevrolet	192	0	Running	26
19	18	49	Ashton Higgins	ALH Motorsports	Toyota	190	0	Accident	25
20	24	11	Zachary Tinkle	Fast Track Racing	Ford	189	0	Running	24
21	25	01	Stephanie Moyer	Fast Track Racing	Toyota	118	0	Accident	23
22	22	42	Christian Rose	Cook Racing Technologies	Chevrolet	113	0	Accident	22
23	31	06	A. J. Moyer	Wayne Peterson Racing	Ford	99	0	Rear End	21
24	29	48	Brad Smith	Brad Smith Motorsports	Chevrolet	92	0	Handling	20
25	10	3	Mason Diaz	Mullins Racing	Toyota	91	0	Oil Line	19
26	15	91	Justin Carroll	TC Motorsports	Toyota	89	0	Handling	18
27	12	55	Conner Jones	Venturini Motorsports	Toyota	76	0	Accident	17
28	27	02	Leland Honeyman (R)	Young's Motorsports	Chevrolet	48	0	Electrical	16
29	30	03	Alex Clubb	Clubb Racing Inc.	Ford	29	0	Electrical	15
30	28	10	Tim Monroe	Fast Track Racing	Toyota	29	0	Starter	14
31	14	30	Amber Balcaen (R)	Rette Jones Racing	Ford	11	0	Accident	13
Official race results

== Standings after the race ==
Drivers' Championship standings

	Pos	Driver	Points
	1	Nick Sanchez	844
	2	Daniel Dye	839 (-5)
	3	Rajah Caruth	814 (-30)
	4	Greg Van Alst	719 (-125)
	5	Toni Breidinger	708 (-136)
	6	Sammy Smith	706 (-138)
	7	Amber Balcaen	655 (-189)
	8	Brad Smith	600 (-244)
1	9	Taylor Gray	527 (-317)
1	10	Zachary Tinkle	519 (-325)

- Note: Only the first 10 positions are included for the driver standings.

Previous race: 2022 Kansas Lottery 150	ARCA Menards Series; 2022 season	Next race: 2022 Herr's Snacks 200

Previous race: 2022 Sprecher 150	ARCA Menards Series East; 2022 season	Next race: 2023 Pensacola 200
