= 2024 Pennzoil 250 =

20th race of the 2024 NASCAR Xfinity Series

Race details
- Race 20 of 33 of the 2024 NASCAR Xfinity Series
- Date: July 20, 2024
- Official name: 13th Annual Pennzoil 250
- Location: Indianapolis Motor Speedway in Speedway, Indiana
- Course: Permanent racing facility
- Course length: 2.5 miles (4.0 km)
- Scheduled distance: 100 laps, 250 mi (400 km)

Pole position
Driver	Cole Custer	Stewart–Haas Racing
- Time: 53.705

Most laps led
Driver	Cole Custer	Stewart-Haas Racing
- Laps: 47

Winner
No. 98	Riley Herbst	Stewart-Haas Racing

Television in the United States
- Network: USA
- Announcers: Rick Allen, Steve Letarte, and Jeff Burton

Radio in the United States
- Radio: IMS

The 2024 Pennzoil 250 was the 20th stock car race of the 2024 NASCAR Xfinity Series, and the 13th iteration of the event. The race was held on Saturday, July 20, 2024, at Indianapolis Motor Speedway in Speedway, Indiana, a 2.5 miles (4.0 km) permanent square-shaped racetrack. Contested over 100 laps, the race ended in a 3-car battle for the win, with Stewart-Haas Racing driver Riley Herbst claiming just his second career win, and his first of the season. It was Stewart-Haas Racing's 100th win across NASCAR's top 3 series. Teammate Cole Custer finished second, and Joe Gibbs Racing’s Aric Almirola finished third. Shane Van Gisbergen and Sheldon Creed rounded out the top five, and Austin Hill, Daniel Dye, A. J. Allmendinger, Justin Allgaier, and Carson Kvapil rounded out the top ten.

This race was followed by a three-week long break for the 2024 Summer Olympics which aired on NBC and USA.

== Report ==
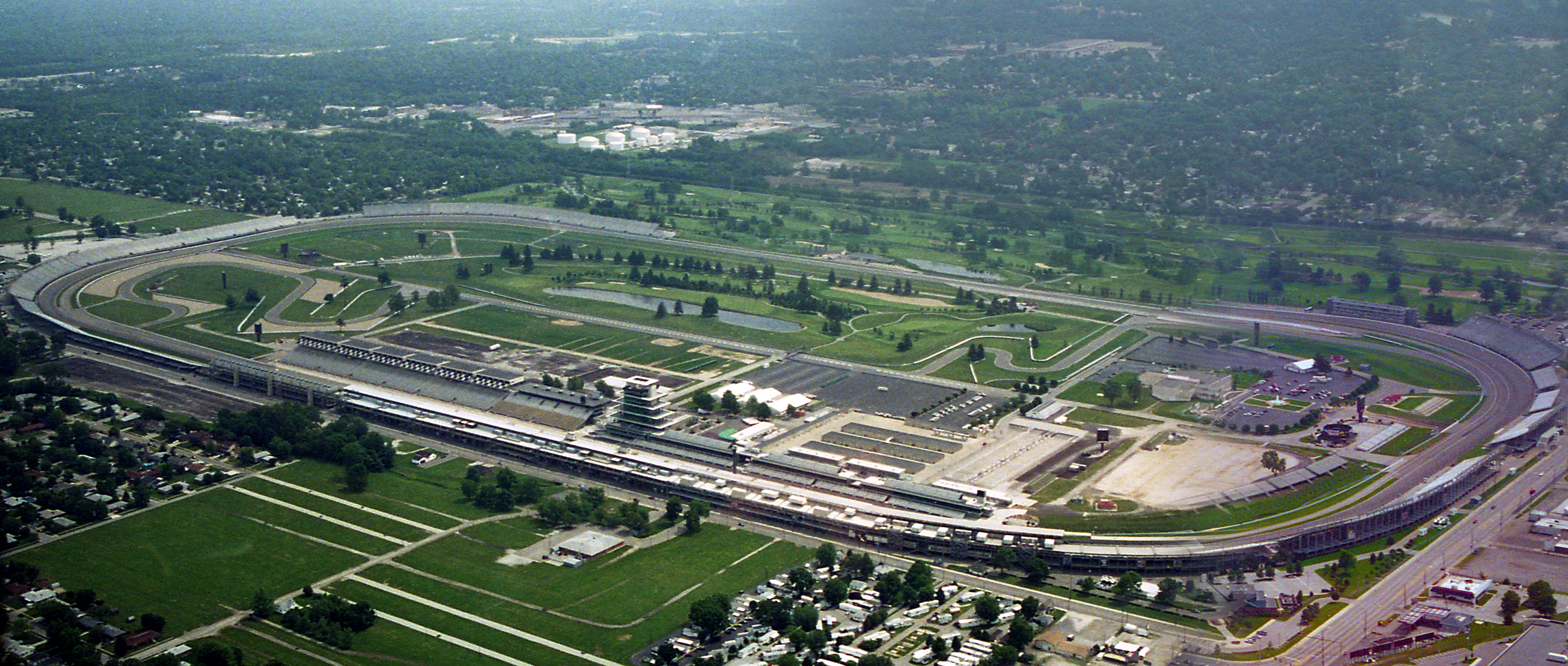
Indianapolis Motor Speedway, the circuit where the race was held.

The Indianapolis Motor Speedway, located in Speedway, Indiana, (an enclave suburb of Indianapolis) in the United States, is the home of the Indianapolis 500 and the Brickyard 400. It is located on the corner of 16th Street and Georgetown Road, approximately six miles (10 km) west of Downtown Indianapolis.

Constructed in 1909, it is the original speedway, the first racing facility so named. It has a permanent seating capacity estimated at 235,000 with infield seating raising capacity to an approximate 400,000. It is the highest-capacity sports venue in the world.

Considered relatively flat by American standards, the track is a 2.5-mile (4.0 km), nearly rectangular oval with dimensions that have remained essentially unchanged since its inception: four 0.25-mile (0.40 km) turns, two 0.625-mile long (1.006 km) straightaways between the fourth and first turns and the second and third turns, and two .125-mile (0.201 km) short straightaways – termed "short chutes" – between the first and second, and third and fourth turns.

=== Entry list ===
- (R) denotes rookie driver.
- (i) denotes driver who is ineligible for series driver points.

#	Driver	Team	Make
00	Cole Custer	Stewart–Haas Racing	Ford
1	Sam Mayer	JR Motorsports	Chevrolet
2	Jesse Love (R)	Richard Childress Racing	Chevrolet
5	Anthony Alfredo	Our Motorsports	Chevrolet
07	Greg Van Alst	SS-Green Light Racing	Chevrolet
7	Justin Allgaier	JR Motorsports	Chevrolet
8	Sammy Smith	JR Motorsports	Chevrolet
9	Brandon Jones	JR Motorsports	Chevrolet
10	Daniel Dye (i)	Kaulig Racing	Chevrolet
11	Josh Williams	Kaulig Racing	Chevrolet
13	B. J. McLeod	MBM Motorsports	Chevrolet
14	David Starr	SS-Green Light Racing	Ford
15	Josh Berry (i)	AM Racing	Ford
16	A. J. Allmendinger	Kaulig Racing	Chevrolet
18	Sheldon Creed	Joe Gibbs Racing	Toyota
19	Joe Graf Jr.	Joe Gibbs Racing	Toyota
20	Aric Almirola	Joe Gibbs Racing	Toyota
21	Austin Hill	Richard Childress Racing	Chevrolet
26	Conor Daly	Sam Hunt Racing	Toyota
27	Jeb Burton	Jordan Anderson Racing	Chevrolet
28	Kyle Sieg	RSS Racing	Ford
29	Blaine Perkins	RSS Racing	Ford
31	Parker Retzlaff	Jordan Anderson Racing	Chevrolet
35	Joey Gase	Joey Gase Motorsports	Chevrolet
38	Matt DiBenedetto	RSS Racing	Ford
39	Ryan Sieg (Note: Due to travel issues, Noah Gragson would pilot the No. 39 car for practice. Sieg was able to take over and complete the practice session.)	RSS Racing	Ford
42	Leland Honeyman (R)	Young's Motorsports	Chevrolet
43	Ryan Ellis	Alpha Prime Racing	Chevrolet
44	Brennan Poole	Alpha Prime Racing	Chevrolet
45	Garrett Smithley	Alpha Prime Racing	Chevrolet
48	Parker Kligerman	Big Machine Racing	Chevrolet
51	Jeremy Clements	Jeremy Clements Racing	Chevrolet
81	Chandler Smith	Joe Gibbs Racing	Toyota
88	Carson Kvapil	JR Motorsports	Chevrolet
91	Kyle Weatherman	DGM Racing	Chevrolet
92	Josh Bilicki	DGM Racing	Chevrolet
97	Shane van Gisbergen (R)	Kaulig Racing	Chevrolet
98	Riley Herbst	Stewart–Haas Racing	Ford
Official entry list

== Practice ==
The first and only practice session was held on Friday, July 19, at 1:05 PM EST, and would last for 50 minutes. Chandler Smith, driving for Joe Gibbs Racing, would set the fastest time in the session, with a lap of 53.971, and a speed of 166.756 mph (268.368 km/h).

Pos.	#	Driver	Team	Make	Time	Speed
1	81	Chandler Smith	Joe Gibbs Racing	Toyota	53.971	166.756
2	48	Parker Kligerman	Big Machine Racing	Chevrolet	54.031	166.571
3	26	Conor Daly	Sam Hunt Racing	Toyota	54.547	164.995
Full practice results

== Qualifying ==
Qualifying was held on Saturday, July 20, at 12:05 PM EST. Since Indianapolis Motor Speedway is an intermediate circuit, the qualifying system used is a single-car, single-lap based system with only one round. Drivers will be on track by themselves and will have one lap to post a qualifying time, and whoever sets the fastest time in that session will win the pole.

Road course qualifying rules were in effect. The timing line was set in Turn 3, where cars exited pit road, drove five-eights of a lap, then took the green flag in the north chute exiting Turn 3, and completing their lap there the next time by. Teams then immediately pitted the car, meaning only two laps were run. Indianapolis and Michigan used restrictor plates.

Cole Custer, driving for Stewart–Haas Racing, would score the pole for the race, with a lap of 53.705, and a speed of 167.582 mph (269.697 km/h).

No drivers would fail to qualify.

=== Qualifying results ===
Pos.	#	Driver	Team	Make	Time	Speed
1	00	Cole Custer	Stewart–Haas Racing	Ford	53.705	167.582
2	98	Riley Herbst	Stewart–Haas Racing	Ford	53.911	166.942
3	20	Aric Almirola	Joe Gibbs Racing	Toyota	53.968	166.765
4	1	Sam Mayer	JR Motorsports	Chevrolet	53.981	166.725
5	5	Anthony Alfredo	Our Motorsports	Chevrolet	54.024	166.593
6	9	Brandon Jones	JR Motorsports	Chevrolet	54.074	166.439
7	88	Carson Kvapil	JR Motorsports	Chevrolet	54.102	166.352
8	16	A. J. Allmendinger	Kaulig Racing	Chevrolet	54.105	166.343
9	7	Justin Allgaier	JR Motorsports	Chevrolet	54.114	166.316
10	15	Josh Berry (i)	AM Racing	Ford	54.186	166.095
11	27	Jeb Burton	Jordan Anderson Racing	Chevrolet	54.261	165.865
12	18	Sheldon Creed	Joe Gibbs Racing	Toyota	54.268	165.844
13	81	Chandler Smith	Joe Gibbs Racing	Toyota	54.270	165.837
14	21	Austin Hill	Richard Childress Racing	Chevrolet	54.285	165.792
15	2	Jesse Love (R)	Richard Childress Racing	Chevrolet	54.296	165.758
16	26	Conor Daly	Sam Hunt Racing	Toyota	54.305	165.731
17	19	Joe Graf Jr.	Joe Gibbs Racing	Toyota	54.474	165.216
18	51	Jeremy Clements	Jeremy Clements Racing	Chevrolet	54.532	165.041
19	11	Josh Williams	Kaulig Racing	Chevrolet	54.545	165.001
20	31	Parker Retzlaff	Jordan Anderson Racing	Chevrolet	54.638	164.721
21	8	Sammy Smith	JR Motorsports	Chevrolet	54.653	164.675
22	10	Daniel Dye (i)	Kaulig Racing	Chevrolet	54.810	164.204
23	97	Shane van Gisbergen (R)	Kaulig Racing	Chevrolet	54.842	164.108
24	29	Blaine Perkins	RSS Racing	Ford	54.939	163.818
25	42	Leland Honeyman (R)	Young's Motorsports	Chevrolet	55.050	163.488
26	45	Garrett Smithley	Alpha Prime Racing	Chevrolet	55.100	163.339
27	39	Ryan Sieg	RSS Racing	Ford	55.120	163.280
28	91	Kyle Weatherman	DGM Racing	Chevrolet	55.135	163.236
29	38	Matt DiBenedetto	RSS Racing	Ford	55.225	162.970
30	44	Brennan Poole	Alpha Prime Racing	Chevrolet	55.362	162.566
31	28	Kyle Sieg	RSS Racing	Ford	55.517	162.113
32	92	Josh Bilicki	DGM Racing	Chevrolet	55.575	161.943
33	13	B. J. McLeod	MBM Motorsports	Chevrolet	55.665	161.681
Qualified by owner's points
34	43	Ryan Ellis	Alpha Prime Racing	Chevrolet	56.031	160.625
35	35	Joey Gase	Joey Gase Motorsports	Chevrolet	56.182	160.194
36	14	David Starr	SS-Green Light Racing	Ford	56.345	159.730
37	07	Greg Van Alst	SS-Green Light Racing	Chevrolet	57.089	157.649
38	48	Parker Kligerman	Big Machine Racing	Chevrolet	–	–
Official qualifying results
Official starting lineup

== Race results ==
Stage 1 Laps: 30

Pos.	#	Driver	Team	Make	Pts
1	98	Riley Herbst	Stewart–Haas Racing	Ford	10
2	16	A. J. Allmendinger	Kaulig Racing	Chevrolet	9
3	39	Ryan Sieg	RSS Racing	Ford	8
4	9	Brandon Jones	JR Motorsports	Chevrolet	7
5	7	Justin Allgaier	JR Motorsports	Chevrolet	6
6	00	Cole Custer	Stewart–Haas Racing	Ford	5
7	48	Parker Kilgerman	Big Machine Racing	Chevrolet	4
8	20	Aric Almirola	Joe Gibbs Racing	Toyota	3
9	88	Carson Kvapil	JR Motorsports	Chevrolet	2
10	38	Matt DiBenedetto	RSS Racing	Ford	1

Stage 2 Laps: 30

Pos.	#	Driver	Team	Make	Pts
1	39	Ryan Sieg	RSS Racing	Ford	10
2	20	Aric Almirola	Joe Gibbs Racing	Toyota	9
3	98	Riley Herbst	Stewart–Haas Racing	Ford	8
4	16	A. J. Allmendinger	Kaulig Racing	Chevrolet	7
5	7	Justin Allgaier	JR Motorsports	Chevrolet	6
6	00	Cole Custer	Stewart-Haas Racing	Ford	5
7	97	Shane van Gisbergen	Kaulig Racing	Chevrolet	4
8	21	Austin Hill	Richard Childress Racing	Chevrolet	3
9	42	Leland Honeyman (R)	Young's Motorsports	Chevrolet	2
10	18	Sheldon Creed	Joe Gibbs Racing	Toyota	1

Stage 3 Laps: 40

Pos.	St.	#	Driver	Team	Make	Laps	Led	Status	Pts
1	2	98	Riley Herbst	Stewart-Haas Racing	Ford	100	30	Running	58
2	1	00	Cole Custer	Stewart-Haas Racing	Ford	100	47	Running	45
3	3	20	Aric Almirola	Joe Gibbs Racing	Toyota	100	5	Running	46
4	23	97	Shane van Gisbergen (R)	Kaulig Racing	Chevrolet	100	0	Running	37
5	12	18	Sheldon Creed	Joe Gibbs Racing	Toyota	100	0	Running	33
6	14	21	Austin Hill	Richard Childress Racing	Chevrolet	100	0	Running	34
7	22	10	Daniel Dye (i)	Kaulig Racing	Chevrolet	100	0	Running	0
8	8	16	A. J. Allmendinger	Kaulig Racing	Chevrolet	100	4	Running	45
9	9	7	Justin Allgaier	JR Motorsports	Chevrolet	100	0	Running	40
10	7	88	Carson Kvapil	JR Motorsports	Chevrolet	100	0	Running	29
11	27	39	Ryan Sieg	RSS Racing	Ford	100	4	Running	44
12	38	48	Parker Kligerman	Big Machine Racing	Chevrolet	100	0	Running	29
13	15	2	Jesse Love (R)	Richard Childress Racing	Chevrolet	100	0	Running	24
14	16	26	Conor Daly	Sam Hunt Racing	Toyota	100	0	Running	23
15	6	9	Brandon Jones	JR Motorsports	Chevrolet	100	10	Running	29
16	29	38	Matt DiBenedetto	RSS Racing	Ford	100	0	Running	22
17	17	19	Joe Graf Jr.	Joe Gibbs Racing	Toyota	100	0	Running	20
18	21	8	Sammy Smith	JR Motorsports	Chevrolet	100	0	Running	19
19	11	27	Jeb Burton	Jordan Anderson Racing	Chevrolet	100	0	Running	18
20	25	42	Leland Honeyman (R)	Young's Motorsports	Chevrolet	100	0	Running	19
21	30	44	Brennan Poole	Alpha Prime Racing	Chevrolet	100	0	Running	16
22	31	28	Kyle Sieg	RSS Racing	Ford	100	0	Running	15
23	34	43	Ryan Ellis	Alpha Prime Racing	Chevrolet	100	0	Running	14
24	35	35	Joey Gase	Joey Gase Motorsports	Chevrolet	100	0	Running	13
25	28	91	Kyle Weatherman	DGM Racing	Chevrolet	100	0	Running	12
26	36	14	David Starr	SS-Green Light Racing	Chevrolet	100	0	Running	11
27	32	92	Josh Bilicki	DGM Motorsports	Chevrolet	100	0	Running	10
28	33	13	B. J. McLeod	MBM Motorsports	Chevrolet	100	0	Running	9
29	24	29	Blaine Perkins	RSS Racing	Ford	100	0	Running	8
30	18	51	Jeremy Clements	Jeremy Clements Racing	Chevrolet	99	0	Running	7
31	26	45	Garrett Smithley	Alpha Prime Racing	Chevrolet	97	0	Running	6
32	37	07	Greg Van Alst	SS-Green Light Racing	Chevrolet	91	0	Ignition	5
33	13	81	Chandler Smith	Joe Gibbs Racing	Chevrolet	86	0	Running	4
34	5	5	Anthony Alfredo	Our Motorsports	Chevrolet	83	0	Accident	3
35	20	31	Parker Retzlaff	Jordan Anderson Racing	Chevrolet	83	0	Accident	2
36	19	11	Josh Williams	Kaulig Racing	Chevrolet	83	0	Accident	1
37	4	1	Sam Mayer	JR Motorsports	Chevrolet	0	0	Accident	1
38	10	15	Josh Berry (i)	AM Racing	Ford	0	0	Accident	0

== Standings after the race ==
Drivers' Championship standings

	Pos	Driver	Points
	1	Cole Custer	761
	2	Justin Allgaier	705 (-56)
1	3	Austin Hill	674 (–87)
1	4	Chandler Smith	661 (–100)
2	5	Riley Herbst	618 (–143)
1	6	A. J. Allmendinger	609 (–152)
2	7	Jesse Love	587 (–174)
	8	Sheldon Creed	576 (–185)
	9	Parker Kligerman	553 (–208)
2	10	Ryan Sieg	510 (–251)
	11	Sammy Smith	507 (–254)
2	12	Sam Mayer	502 (–259)
Official driver's standings

Manufacturers' Championship standings

Pos	Manufacturer	Points
1	Chevrolet	745
2	Toyota	708 (-37)
3	Ford	644 (–101)

- Note: Only the first 12 positions are included for the driver standings.

Previous race: 2024 Explore the Pocono Mountains 225	NASCAR Xfinity Series; 2024 season	Next race: 2024 Cabo Wabo 250
