= 2022 Kansas Lottery 150 =

17th race of the 2022 ARCA Menards Series

Race details
- Race 17 of 20 of the 2022 ARCA Menards Series
- Date: September 11, 2022
- Official name: 22nd Annual Kansas Lottery 150
- Location: Kansas Speedway, Kansas City, Kansas
- Course: Permanent racing facility
- Course length: 1.5 miles (2.4 km)
- Distance: 105 laps, 157.5 mi (253.47 km)
- Scheduled distance: 100 laps, 150 mi (241.402 km)
- Average speed: 114.987 mph (185.054 km/h)

Pole position
Driver	Corey Heim	Venturini Motorsports
- Time: 30.707

Most laps led
Driver	Corey Heim	Venturini Motorsports
- Laps: 101

Winner
No. 20	Corey Heim	Venturini Motorsports

Television in the United States
- Network: MAVTV
- Announcers: Krista Voda, Jim Tretow

Radio in the United States
- Radio: Motor Racing Network

The 2022 Kansas Lottery 150 was the 17th stock car race of the 2022 ARCA Menards Series season, and the 22nd iteration of the event. The race was originally scheduled to be held on Saturday, September 10, 2022, but postponed due to inclement weather. The race was later held on Sunday, September 11, in Kansas City, Kansas, at Kansas Speedway, a 1.5-mile (2.4 km) permanent tri-oval shaped racetrack. The race distance was increased from 100 laps to 105 laps due to a NASCAR overtime finish. Corey Heim, driving for Venturini Motorsports, put on a dominating performance, leading nearly every lap for his ninth career ARCA Menards Series win, and his second of the season. To fill out the podium, Nick Sanchez, driving for Rev Racing, and Sammy Smith, driving for Kyle Busch Motorsports, would finish 2nd and 3rd, respectively.

== Background ==
Kansas Speedway is a 1.5-mile (2.4 km) tri-oval race track in the Village West area near Kansas City, Kansas, United States. It was built in 2001, and it currently hosts two annual NASCAR race weekends. The IndyCar Series also held races at the venue until 2011. The speedway is owned and operated by NASCAR.

=== Entry list ===
- (R) denotes rookie driver

#	Driver	Team	Make	Sponsor
01	Zachary Tinkle	Fast Track Racing	Ford	Racing for Rescues
2	Nick Sanchez	Rev Racing	Chevrolet	Gainbridge, Max Siegel Inc.
03	Alex Clubb	Clubb Racing Inc.	Ford	Vestco Lawncare, Henry Kraft Janitorial Supplies
06	Kevin Hinckle	Wayne Peterson Racing	Toyota	GreatRailing.com
6	Rajah Caruth (R)	Rev Racing	Chevrolet	Max Siegel Inc.
7	Matt Wilson	CCM Racing	Toyota	R. A. Wilson Enterprises
10	Jon Garrett	Fast Track Racing	Chevrolet	Rock Creek Distillery, Fort Worth Screen Printing
11	Ryan Huff	Huff Racing	Ford	Southeastern Services
12	Tim Monroe	Fast Track Racing	Ford	Fast Track Racing
15	Parker Chase	Venturini Motorsports	Toyota	Vertical Bridge
18	Sammy Smith (R)	Kyle Busch Motorsports	Toyota	TMC Transportation
20	Corey Heim	Venturini Motorsports	Toyota	Crescent Tools
25	Toni Breidinger (R)	Venturini Motorsports	Toyota	FP Movement
30	Amber Balcaen (R)	Rette Jones Racing	Ford	ICON Direct
35	Greg Van Alst	Greg Van Alst Motorsports	Ford	CB Fabricating
42	Christian Rose	Cook Racing Technologies	Toyota	West Virginia Tourism #AlmostHeaven
43	Daniel Dye (R)	GMS Racing	Chevrolet	Race to Stop Suicide
44	Ron Vandermeir Jr.	Vanco Racing	Ford	Mak Rak Repair, Finish Line Flooring
48	Brad Smith	Brad Smith Motorsports	Chevrolet	PSST...Copraya Websites
69	Scott Melton	Kimmel Racing	Toyota	Melton-McFadden Insurance Agency
72	Cody Coughlin	Coughlin Brothers Racing	Ford	JEGS, Coughlin Company
Official entry list

== Practice ==
The only 35-minute practice session was held on Saturday, September 10, at 9:15 am CST. Corey Heim, driving for Venturini Motorsports, was the fastest in the session, with a lap of 30.627, and an average speed of 176.315 mph (283.751 km/h).

Pos.	#	Driver	Team	Make	Time	Speed
1	20	Corey Heim	Venturini Motorsports	Toyota	30.627	176.315
2	43	Daniel Dye (R)	GMS Racing	Chevrolet	30.996	174.216
3	18	Sammy Smith (R)	Kyle Busch Motorsports	Toyota	31.248	172.811
Full practice results

== Qualifying ==
Qualifying was held on Saturday, September 10, at 10:00 am CST. The qualifying system employed a multiple-car, multiple-lap system with only one round. Whoever sets the fastest time in the round wins the pole. Corey Heim, driving for Venturini Motorsports, scored the pole for the race, with a lap of 30.707, and an average speed of 175.856 mph (283.013 km/h).

Pos.	#	Name	Team	Make	Time	Speed
1	20	Corey Heim	Venturini Motorsports	Toyota	30.707	175.856
2	43	Daniel Dye (R)	GMS Racing	Chevrolet	30.991	174.244
3	2	Nick Sanchez	Rev Racing	Chevrolet	31.126	173.488
4	18	Sammy Smith (R)	Kyle Busch Motorsports	Toyota	31.291	172.574
5	6	Rajah Caruth (R)	Rev Racing	Chevrolet	31.320	172.414
6	72	Cody Coughlin	Coughlin Brothers Racing	Ford	31.344	172.282
7	44	Ron Vandermeir Jr.	Vanco Racing	Ford	31.392	172.018
8	15	Parker Chase	Venturini Motorsports	Toyota	31.430	171.810
9	42	Christian Rose	Cook Racing Technologies	Chevrolet	32.002	168.739
10	30	Amber Balcaen (R)	Rette Jones Racing	Ford	32.094	168.256
11	35	Greg Van Alst	Greg Van Alst Motorsports	Ford	32.275	167.312
12	11	Ryan Huff	Huff Racing	Ford	32.294	167.214
13	25	Toni Breidinger (R)	Venturini Motorsports	Toyota	32.296	167.203
14	69	Scott Melton	Kimmel Racing	Toyota	32.594	165.675
15	10	Jon Garrett	Fast Track Racing	Chevrolet	33.368	161.832
16	01	Zachary Tinkle	Fast Track Racing	Ford	34.360	157.159
17	12	Tim Monroe	Fast Track Racing	Ford	35.178	153.505
18	06	Kevin Hinckle	Wayne Peterson Racing	Toyota	36.674	147.243
19	03	Alex Clubb	Clubb Racing Inc.	Ford	40.342	133.856
20	48	Brad Smith	Brad Smith Motorsports	Chevrolet	46.731	115.555
21	7	Matt Wilson	CCM Racing	Toyota	–	–
Official qualifying results

== Race results ==
Fin.	St	#	Driver	Team	Make	Laps	Led	Status	Pts
1	1	20	Corey Heim	Venturini Motorsports	Toyota	105	101	Running	48
2	3	2	Nick Sanchez	Rev Racing	Chevrolet	105	0	Running	42
3	4	18	Sammy Smith (R)	Kyle Busch Motorsports	Toyota	105	0	Running	41
4	2	43	Daniel Dye (R)	GMS Racing	Chevrolet	105	0	Running	40
5	12	11	Ryan Huff	Huff Racing	Ford	105	0	Running	39
6	8	15	Parker Chase	Venturini Motorsports	Toyota	105	0	Running	38
7	9	42	Christian Rose	Cook Racing Technologies	Chevrolet	104	0	Running	37
8	10	30	Amber Balcaen (R)	Rette Jones Racing	Ford	104	0	Running	36
9	13	25	Toni Breidinger (R)	Venturini Motorsports	Toyota	103	0	Running	35
10	15	10	Jon Garrett	Fast Track Racing	Chevrolet	103	0	Running	34
11	14	69	Scott Melton	Kimmel Racing	Toyota	103	0	Running	33
12	5	6	Rajah Caruth (R)	Rev Racing	Chevrolet	97	0	Accident	32
13	20	48	Brad Smith	Brad Smith Motorsports	Chevrolet	95	0	Running	31
14	21	7	Matt Wilson	CCM Racing	Toyota	91	0	Running	30
15	6	72	Cody Coughlin	Coughlin Brothers Racing	Ford	89	4	Fuel Pump	30
16	18	06	Kevin Hinckle	Wayne Peterson Racing	Toyota	61	0	Oil Pressure	28
17	11	35	Greg Van Alst	Greg Van Alst Motorsports	Ford	40	0	Accident	27
18	19	03	Alex Clubb	Clubb Racing Inc.	Ford	24	0	Oil Line	26
19	17	12	Tim Monroe	Fast Track Racing	Ford	11	0	Drive Train	25
20	16	01	Zachary Tinkle	Fast Track Racing	Ford	9	0	Electrical	24
21	7	44	Ron Vandermeir Jr.	Vanco Racing	Ford	0	0	Did Not Start	23
Official race results

== Standings after the race ==
Drivers' Championship standings

	Pos	Driver	Points
	1	Nick Sanchez	812
	2	Daniel Dye	800 (−12)
	3	Rajah Caruth	774 (−38)
	4	Greg Van Alst	687 (−125)
	5	Toni Breidinger	680 (−132)
	6	Sammy Smith	657 (−155)
	7	Amber Balcaen	642 (−170)
	8	Brad Smith	580 (−232)
2	9	Zachary Tinkle	495 (−317)
1	10	Taylor Gray	485 (−327)

- Note: Only the first 10 positions are included for the driver standings.

Previous race: 2022 Rust-Oleum Automotive Finishes 100	ARCA Menards Series; 2022 season	Next race: 2022 Bush's Beans 200
