= 2022 Herr's Snacks 200 =

19th race of the 2022 ARCA Menards Series

Race details
- Race 19 of 20 of the 2022 ARCA Menards Series
- Date: October 1, 2022
- Official name: 26th Annual Herr's Snacks 200
- Location: Salem Speedway, Salem, Indiana
- Course: Permanent racing facility
- Course length: 0.555 miles (0.893 km)
- Distance: 200 laps, 111 mi (179 km)
- Scheduled distance: 200 laps, 111 mi (179 km)
- Average speed: 79.856 mph (128.516 km/h)

Pole position
Driver	Sammy Smith	Kyle Busch Motorsports
- Time: 17.157

Most laps led
Driver	Sammy Smith	Kyle Busch Motorsports
- Laps: 200

Winner
No. 18	Sammy Smith	Kyle Busch Motorsports

Television in the United States
- Network: MAVTV
- Announcers: Krista Voda, Jim Tretow

Radio in the United States
- Radio: ARCA Racing Network

The 2022 Herr's Snacks 200 was the 19th stock car race of the 2022 ARCA Menards Series season, and the 26th iteration of the event. The race was held on Saturday, October 1, 2022, in Salem, Indiana at Salem Speedway, a 0.555 mile (0.893 km) permanent oval shaped racetrack. The race took the scheduled 200 laps to complete. Sammy Smith, driving for Kyle Busch Motorsports, captured the win in a dominating fashion, leading every lap for his fifth career ARCA Menards Series win, and his fifth of the season. To fill out the podium, Jesse Love, driving for Venturini Motorsports, and Daniel Dye, driving for GMS Racing, would finish 2nd and 3rd, respectively.

== Background ==
Salem Speedway is a .555 miles (0.893 km) long paved oval motor racetrack in Washington Township, Washington County, near Salem, Indiana, approximately 100 miles (160 km) south of Indianapolis. The track has 33° degrees of banking in the corners. Major auto racing series that run at Salem are ARCA and USAC.

=== Entry list ===
- (R) denotes rookie driver

#	Driver	Team	Make	Sponsor
01	Tim Monroe	Fast Track Racing	Ford	Fast Track High Performance Driving School
2	Nick Sanchez	Rev Racing	Chevrolet	Gainbridge, Max Siegel Inc.
03	Alex Clubb	Clubb Racing Inc.	Ford	Delma Cowart Throwback
06	Nate Moeller*	Wayne Peterson Racing	Toyota	GreatRailing.com
6	Rajah Caruth (R)	Rev Racing	Chevrolet	Max Siegel Inc.
10	Bryce Haugeberg	Fast Track Racing	Toyota	Universal Technical Institute
11	Ed Pompa	Fast Track Racing	Toyota	Hy Torc of New York, Double H Ranch
12	Zachary Tinkle	Fast Track Racing	Ford	Racing for Rescues
15	Conner Jones	Venturini Motorsports	Toyota	Jones Utilities
17	Taylor Gray	David Gilliland Racing	Ford	Ford Performance
18	Sammy Smith (R)	Kyle Busch Motorsports	Toyota	TMC Transportation
20	Jesse Love (R)	Venturini Motorsports	Toyota	Crescent Tools
25	Toni Breidinger (R)	Venturini Motorsports	Toyota	Pit Viper Sunglasses
30	Amber Balcaen (R)	Rette Jones Racing	Ford	ICON Direct
35	Greg Van Alst	Greg Van Alst Motorsports	Ford	CB Fabricating
43	Daniel Dye (R)	GMS Racing	Chevrolet	Halifax Health, SolarFit
44	Landon Huffman	Jeff McClure Racing	Ford	Ferrier-McClure Racing
48	Brad Smith	Brad Smith Motorsports	Chevrolet	PSST...Copraya Websites
69	Will Kimmel	Kimmel Racing	Ford	Kimmel Racing
Official entry list

- Tim Richmond was entered in the No. 06, but was replaced by Moeller after he crashed in qualifying.

== Practice ==
The only 45-minute practice session was held on Saturday, October 1, at 12:30 PM EST. Sammy Smith, driving for Kyle Busch Motorsports, and Jesse Love, driving for Venturini Motorsports, were both tied for the fastest time in the session, with a lap of 17.291, and an average speed of 115.551 mph (185.961 km/h).

Pos.	#	Driver	Team	Make	Time	Speed
1	18	Sammy Smith (R)	Kyle Busch Motorsports	Toyota	17.291	115.551
2	20	Jesse Love (R)	Venturini Motorsports	Toyota	17.291	115.551
3	15	Conner Jones	Venturini Motorsports	Toyota	17.597	113.542
Full practice results

== Qualifying ==
Qualifying was held on Saturday, October 1, at 2:00 PM EST. The qualifying system used is a single-car, two-lap system with only one round. Whoever sets the fastest time in the round wins the pole. Sammy Smith, driving for Kyle Busch Motorsports, scored the pole for the race, with a lap of 17.157, and an average speed of 116.454 mph (187.415 km/h).

Pos.	#	Name	Team	Make	Time	Speed
1	18	Sammy Smith (R)	Kyle Busch Motorsports	Toyota	17.157	116.454
2	17	Taylor Gray	David Gilliland Racing	Ford	17.298	115.505
3	20	Jesse Love (R)	Venturini Motorsports	Toyota	17.324	115.331
4	6	Rajah Caruth (R)	Rev Racing	Chevrolet	17.352	115.145
5	2	Nick Sanchez	Rev Racing	Chevrolet	17.410	114.762
6	43	Daniel Dye (R)	GMS Racing	Chevrolet	17.454	114.472
7	69	Will Kimmel	Kimmel Racing	Ford	17.457	114.453
8	15	Conner Jones	Venturini Motorsports	Toyota	17.538	113.924
9	44	Landon Huffman	Jeff McClure Racing	Ford	17.771	112.430
10	35	Greg Van Alst	Greg Van Alst Motorsports	Ford	18.084	110.484
11	25	Toni Breidinger (R)	Venturini Motorsports	Toyota	18.257	109.437
12	12	Zachary Tinkle	Fast Track Racing	Ford	18.518	107.895
13	11	Ed Pompa	Fast Track Racing	Toyota	18.907	105.675
14	10	Bryce Haugeberg	Fast Track Racing	Toyota	19.372	103.139
15	01	Tim Monroe	Fast Track Racing	Ford	20.100	99.403
16	03	Alex Clubb	Clubb Racing Inc.	Ford	21.138	94.522
17	48	Brad Smith	Brad Smith Motorsports	Chevrolet	21.417	93.290
18	06	Nate Moeller	Wayne Peterson Racing	Toyota	-	-
19	30	Amber Balcaen (R)	Rette Jones Racing	Ford	-	-
Official qualifying results

== Race results ==
Fin.	St	#	Driver	Team	Make	Laps	Led	Status	Pts
1	1	18	Sammy Smith (R)	Kyle Busch Motorsports	Toyota	200	200	Running	49
2	3	20	Jesse Love (R)	Venturini Motorsports	Toyota	200	0	Running	42
3	6	43	Daniel Dye (R)	GMS Racing	Chevrolet	200	0	Running	41
4	7	69	Will Kimmel	Kimmel Racing	Ford	200	0	Running	40
5	2	17	Taylor Gray	David Gilliland Racing	Ford	200	0	Running	39
6	5	2	Nick Sanchez	Rev Racing	Chevrolet	200	0	Running	38
7	10	35	Greg Van Alst	Greg Van Alst Motorsports	Ford	196	0	Running	37
8	11	25	Toni Breidinger (R)	Venturini Motorsports	Toyota	195	0	Running	36
9	19	30	Amber Balcaen (R)	Rette Jones Racing	Ford	194	0	Running	35
10	14	10	Bryce Haugeberg	Fast Track Racing	Toyota	179	0	Running	34
11	13	11	Ed Pompa	Fast Track Racing	Toyota	178	0	Running	33
12	16	03	Alex Clubb	Clubb Racing Inc.	Ford	170	0	Running	32
13	8	15	Conner Jones	Venturini Motorsports	Toyota	162	0	Suspension	31
14	17	48	Brad Smith	Brad Smith Motorsports	Chevrolet	162	0	Running	30
15	4	6	Rajah Caruth (R)	Rev Racing	Chevrolet	147	0	Suspension	29
16	9	44	Landon Huffman	Jeff McClure Racing	Ford	125	0	Suspension	28
17	12	12	Zachary Tinkle	Fast Track Racing	Ford	46	0	Radiator	27
18	15	01	Tim Monroe	Fast Track Racing	Ford	10	0	Carburetor	26
19	18	06	Nate Moeller	Wayne Peterson Racing	Toyota	1	0	Clutch	25
Official race results

== Standings after the race ==
Drivers' Championship standings

	Pos	Driver	Points
	1	Nick Sanchez	882
	2	Daniel Dye	880 (-2)
	3	Rajah Caruth	843 (-39)
	4	Greg Van Alst	756 (-126)
1	5	Sammy Smith	754 (-128)
1	6	Toni Breidinger	744 (-138)
	7	Amber Balcaen	690 (-192)
	8	Brad Smith	630 (-252)
	9	Taylor Gray	566 (-316)
1	10	Jesse Love	559 (-323)

- Note: Only the first 10 positions are included for the driver standings.

Previous race: 2022 Bush's Beans 200	ARCA Menards Series; 2022 season	Next race: 2022 Shore Lunch 200
