= 2025 NASCAR Craftsman Truck Series Championship Race =

25th race of the 2025 NASCAR Craftsman Truck Series

Race details
- Race 25 of 25 of the 2025 NASCAR Craftsman Truck Series
- Date: October 31, 2025
- Location: Phoenix Raceway in Avondale, Arizona
- Course: Permanent racing facility
- Course length: 1.022 miles (1.645 km)
- Distance: 161 laps, 161 mi (259.104 km)
- Scheduled distance: 150 laps, 150 mi (241.402 km)
- Average speed: 87.434 mph (140.711 km/h)

Pole position
Driver	Layne Riggs	Front Row Motorsports
- Time: 26.707

Most laps led
Driver	Corey Heim	Tricon Garage
- Laps: 100

Fastest lap
Driver	Corey Heim	Tricon Garage
- Time: 27.590

Winner
No. 11	Corey Heim	Tricon Garage

Television in the United States
- Network: FS1
- Announcers: Jamie Little, Michael Waltrip, and Regan Smith

Radio in the United States
- Radio: NRN
- Booth announcers: Alex Hayden, Mike Bagley and Todd Gordon
- Turn announcers: Dave Moody (1 & 2) and Kurt Becker (3 & 4)

The 2025 NASCAR Craftsman Truck Series Championship Race was the 25th and final stock car race of the 2025 NASCAR Craftsman Truck Series. The race was held on Friday, October 31, 2025, at Phoenix Raceway in Avondale, Arizona, a 1 mile (1.6 km) tri-oval track. The race was contested over 161 laps, extended from 150 laps due to multiple overtime restarts.

In an action-packed race with late drama, Corey Heim, driving for Tricon Garage, would finish off a record-breaking season, rebounding from a late restart and making a seven-wide pass from the tenth position, and after climbing to second when another caution came out, he passed Ty Majeski on the final restart to earn his 23rd career NASCAR Craftsman Truck Series win, and a series record 12th of the season, clinching his first career Truck Series championship. Majeski settled for second to finish second in the championship, Kaden Honeycutt finished third in the championship with a third-place finish, and Tyler Ankrum rounded out the Championship 4 drivers with a 14th place finish, and fourth in the championship standings.

This was the fifth and last consecutive championship race held at Phoenix as the event will move to Homestead–Miami Speedway in 2026 for the first time since 2019. Phoenix will continue to serve as the championship race in the future, but on a rotational deal.

This was also the final full-time race for longtime veteran Matt Crafton, who announced his retirement from full-time racing on August 18.

== Report ==
=== Background ===
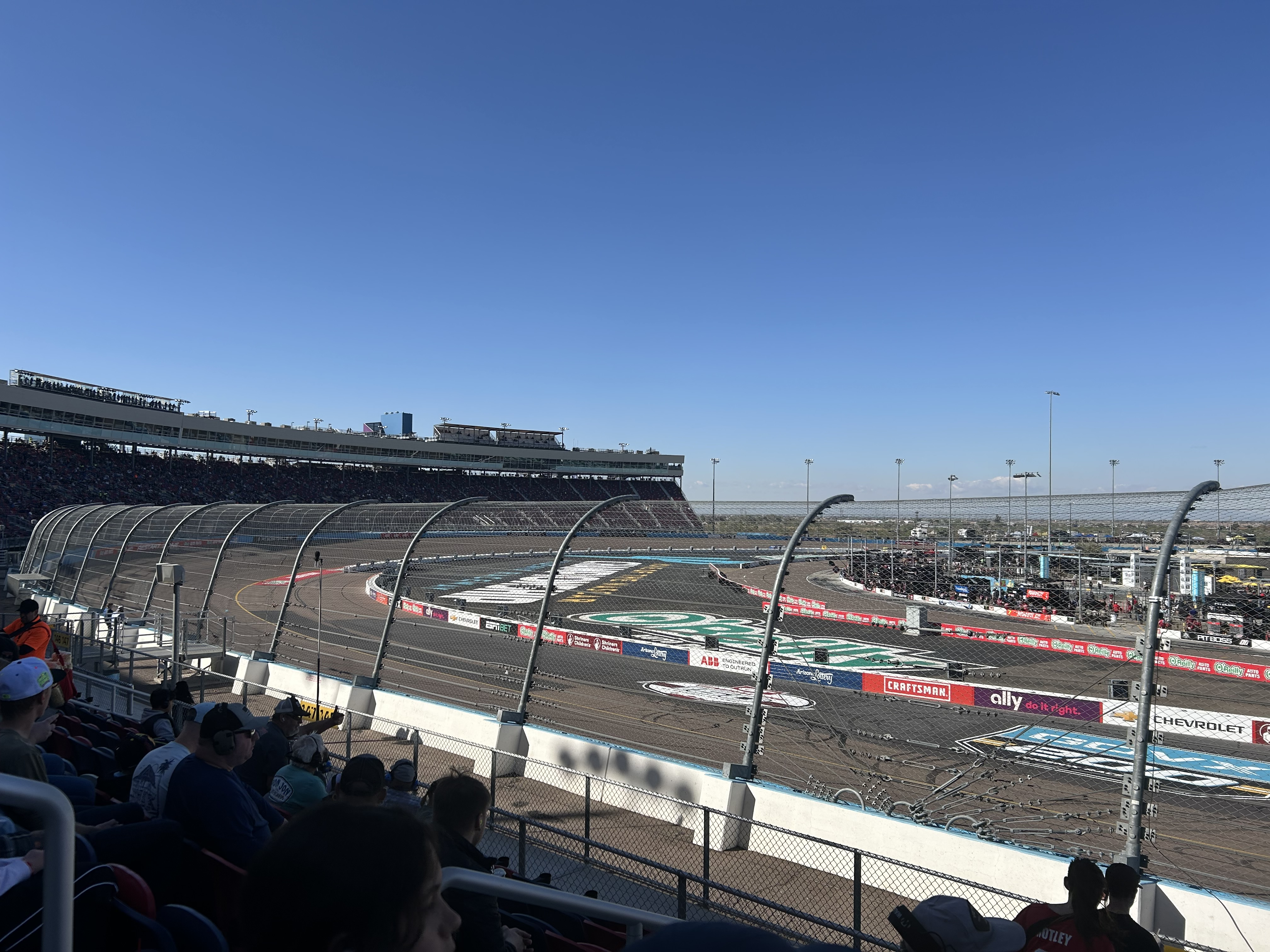
Phoenix Raceway, the track where the race will be held.

Phoenix Raceway – also known as PIR – is a one-mile, low-banked tri-oval race track located in Avondale, Arizona. It is named after the nearby metropolitan area of Phoenix. The motorsport track opened in 1964 and currently hosts two NASCAR race weekends annually. PIR has also hosted the IndyCar Series, CART, USAC and the Rolex Sports Car Series. The raceway is currently owned and operated by International Speedway Corporation.

The raceway was originally constructed with a 2.5 mi (4.0 km) road course that ran both inside and outside of the main tri-oval. In 1991, the track was reconfigured with the current 1.51 mi (2.43 km) interior layout. PIR has an estimated grandstand seating capacity of around 67,000. Lights were installed around the track in 2004 following the addition of a second annual NASCAR race weekend.

Phoenix Raceway is home to two annual NASCAR race weekends, one of 13 facilities on the NASCAR schedule to host more than one race weekend a year. The track is both the first and last stop in the western United States, as well as the fourth, and hosts the championship race on the schedule. In 2026, Homestead-Miami would host the championship race, while Phoenix would retain its second date in the Round of 8.

==== Championship drivers ====
- Corey Heim was the first of four drivers to clinch a spot in the Championship 4, winning at Charlotte and Martinsville.
- Ty Majeski clinched the second spot in the Championship 4 at Martinsville.
- Tyler Ankrum clinched the third spot in the Championship 4 at Martinsville.
- Kaden Honeycutt clinched the final spot in the Championship 4 at Martinsville.

==== Entry list ====
- (R) denotes rookie driver.
- (CC) denotes championship contender.
- (OC) denotes owner's championship truck.

#	Driver	Team	Make
1	Brent Crews	Tricon Garage	Toyota
02	Nathan Byrd	Young's Motorsports	Chevrolet
2	Clayton Green	Reaume Brothers Racing	Ford
5	Toni Breidinger (R)	Tricon Garage	Toyota
7	Stefan Parsons	Spire Motorsports	Chevrolet
9	Grant Enfinger	CR7 Motorsports	Chevrolet
11	Corey Heim (CC)	Tricon Garage	Toyota
13	Jake Garcia	ThorSport Racing	Ford
15	Tanner Gray	Tricon Garage	Toyota
17	Gio Ruggiero (R)	Tricon Garage	Toyota
18	Tyler Ankrum (CC)	McAnally–Hilgemann Racing	Chevrolet
19	Daniel Hemric	McAnally–Hilgemann Racing	Chevrolet
22	Mason Maggio	Reaume Brothers Racing	Ford
26	Dawson Sutton (R)	Rackley W.A.R.	Chevrolet
33	Frankie Muniz (R)	Reaume Brothers Racing	Ford
34	Layne Riggs (OC)	Front Row Motorsports	Ford
35	Greg Van Alst	Greg Van Alst Motorsports	Toyota
38	Chandler Smith	Front Row Motorsports	Ford
41	Tyler Reif	Niece Motorsports	Chevrolet
42	Matt Mills	Niece Motorsports	Chevrolet
44	Andrés Pérez de Lara (R)	Niece Motorsports	Chevrolet
45	Bayley Currey	Niece Motorsports	Chevrolet
52	Kaden Honeycutt (CC)	Halmar Friesen Racing	Toyota
62	Cole Butcher	Halmar Friesen Racing	Toyota
66	Luke Baldwin	ThorSport Racing	Ford
71	Rajah Caruth	Spire Motorsports	Chevrolet
74	Caleb Costner	Mike Harmon Racing	Chevrolet
76	Spencer Boyd	Freedom Racing Enterprises	Chevrolet
77	Corey LaJoie	Spire Motorsports	Chevrolet
81	Connor Mosack (R)	McAnally–Hilgemann Racing	Chevrolet
88	Matt Crafton	ThorSport Racing	Ford
91	Jack Wood	McAnally–Hilgemann Racing	Chevrolet
98	Ty Majeski (CC)	ThorSport Racing	Ford
99	Ben Rhodes	ThorSport Racing	Ford
Official entry list

== Practice ==
The first and only practice session was held on Thursday, October 30, at 4:35 PM MST, and would last for 50 minutes. Ty Majeski, driving for ThorSport Racing, would set the fastest time in the session, with a lap of 26.913, and a speed of 133.764 mph (215.272 km/h).

Pos.	#	Driver	Team	Make	Time	Speed
1	98	Ty Majeski (CC)	ThorSport Racing	Ford	26.913	133.764
2	34	Layne Riggs (OC)	Front Row Motorsports	Ford	26.923	133.715
3	1	Brent Crews	Tricon Garage	Toyota	27.222	132.246
Full practice results

== Qualifying ==
Qualifying was held on Friday, October 31, at 12:35 PM MST. Since Phoenix Raceway is a mile oval, the qualifying procedure used is a single-car, one-lap system with one round. Drivers will be on track by themselves and will have one lap to post a qualifying time, and whoever sets the fastest time will win the pole.

Layne Riggs, driving for Front Row Motorsports, would score the pole for the race, with a lap of 26.707, and a speed of 134.796 mph (216.933 km/h). Although he was credited with the pole, Riggs will start from the rear of the field, and serve a pass-through after the green flag due to failing pre-race inspection multiple times.

No drivers would fail to qualify.

=== Qualifying results ===
Pos.	#	Driver	Team	Make	Time	Speed
1	34	Layne Riggs (OC)	Front Row Motorsports	Ford	26.707	134.796
2	38	Chandler Smith	Front Row Motorsports	Ford	26.724	134.710
3	1	Brent Crews	Tricon Garage	Toyota	26.739	134.635
4	15	Tanner Gray	Tricon Garage	Toyota	26.742	134.620
5	52	Kaden Honeycutt (CC)	Halmar Friesen Racing	Toyota	26.747	134.595
6	11	Corey Heim (CC)	Tricon Garage	Toyota	26.771	134.474
7	71	Rajah Caruth	Spire Motorsports	Chevrolet	26.850	134.078
8	98	Ty Majeski (CC)	ThorSport Racing	Ford	26.878	133.939
9	17	Gio Ruggiero (R)	Tricon Garage	Toyota	26.895	133.854
10	99	Ben Rhodes	ThorSport Racing	Ford	26.957	133.546
11	7	Stefan Parsons	Spire Motorsports	Chevrolet	27.000	133.333
12	77	Corey LaJoie	Spire Motorsports	Chevrolet	27.002	133.323
13	41	Tyler Reif	Niece Motorsports	Chevrolet	27.005	133.309
14	13	Jake Garcia	ThorSport Racing	Ford	27.039	133.141
15	91	Jack Wood	McAnally–Hilgemann Racing	Chevrolet	27.047	133.102
16	44	Andrés Pérez de Lara (R)	Niece Motorsports	Chevrolet	27.054	133.067
17	45	Bayley Currey	Niece Motorsports	Chevrolet	27.059	133.043
18	62	Cole Butcher	Halmar Friesen Racing	Toyota	27.067	133.003
19	19	Daniel Hemric	McAnally–Hilgemann Racing	Chevrolet	27.073	132.974
20	81	Connor Mosack (R)	McAnally–Hilgemann Racing	Chevrolet	27.085	132.915
21	18	Tyler Ankrum (CC)	McAnally–Hilgemann Racing	Chevrolet	27.122	132.734
22	26	Dawson Sutton (R)	Rackley W.A.R.	Chevrolet	27.159	132.553
23	9	Grant Enfinger	CR7 Motorsports	Chevrolet	27.167	132.514
24	66	Luke Baldwin	ThorSport Racing	Ford	27.184	132.431
25	88	Matt Crafton	ThorSport Racing	Ford	27.501	130.904
26	5	Toni Breidinger (R)	Tricon Garage	Toyota	27.552	130.662
27	76	Spencer Boyd	Freedom Racing Enterprises	Chevrolet	27.602	130.425
28	33	Frankie Muniz (R)	Reaume Brothers Racing	Ford	27.627	130.307
29	02	Nathan Byrd	Young's Motorsports	Chevrolet	27.783	129.576
30	2	Clayton Green	Reaume Brothers Racing	Ford	28.024	128.461
31	35	Greg Van Alst	Greg Van Alst Motorsports	Toyota	28.607	125.843
Qualified by owner's points
32	22	Mason Maggio	Reaume Brothers Racing	Ford	28.633	125.729
33	74	Caleb Costner	Mike Harmon Racing	Chevrolet	–	–
34	42	Matt Mills	Niece Motorsports	Chevrolet	–	–
Official qualifying results
Official starting lineup

== Race results ==
Stage 1 Laps: 45

Pos.	#	Driver	Team	Make	Pts
1	11	Corey Heim (CC)	Tricon Garage	Toyota	0
2	1	Brent Crews	Tricon Garage	Toyota	9
3	98	Ty Majeski (CC)	ThorSport Racing	Ford	0
4	71	Rajah Caruth	Spire Motorsports	Chevrolet	7
5	15	Tanner Gray	Tricon Garage	Toyota	6
6	77	Corey LaJoie	Spire Motorsports	Chevrolet	5
7	52	Kaden Honeycutt (CC)	Halmar Friesen Racing	Toyota	0
8	7	Stefan Parsons	Spire Motorsports	Chevrolet	3
9	13	Jake Garcia	ThorSport Racing	Ford	2
10	17	Gio Ruggiero (R)	Tricon Garage	Toyota	1

Stage 2 Laps: 45

Pos.	#	Driver	Team	Make	Pts
1	11	Corey Heim (CC)	Tricon Garage	Toyota	0
2	98	Ty Majeski (CC)	ThorSport Racing	Ford	0
3	1	Brent Crews	Tricon Garage	Toyota	8
4	52	Kaden Honeycutt (CC)	Halmar Friesen Racing	Toyota	0
5	71	Rajah Caruth	Spire Motorsports	Chevrolet	6
6	15	Tanner Gray	Tricon Garage	Toyota	5
7	34	Layne Riggs (OC)	Front Row Motorsports	Ford	4
8	13	Jake Garcia	ThorSport Racing	Ford	3
9	7	Stefan Parsons	Spire Motorsports	Chevrolet	2
10	17	Gio Ruggiero (R)	Tricon Garage	Toyota	1

Stage 3 Laps: 71

Fin	St	#	Driver	Team	Make	Laps	Led	Status	Pts
1	6	11	Corey Heim (CC)	Tricon Garage	Toyota	161	100	Running	41
2	8	98	Ty Majeski (CC)	ThorSport Racing	Ford	161	9	Running	35
3	5	52	Kaden Honeycutt (CC)	Halmar Friesen Racing	Toyota	161	0	Running	34
4	1	34	Layne Riggs (OC)	Front Row Motorsports	Ford	161	24	Running	37
5	7	71	Rajah Caruth	Spire Motorsports	Chevrolet	161	3	Running	45
6	14	13	Jake Garcia	ThorSport Racing	Ford	161	0	Running	36
7	12	77	Corey LaJoie	Spire Motorsports	Chevrolet	161	0	Running	35
8	2	38	Chandler Smith	Front Row Motorsports	Ford	161	21	Running	29
9	13	41	Tyler Reif	Niece Motorsports	Chevrolet	161	0	Running	28
10	15	91	Jack Wood	McAnally–Hilgemann Racing	Chevrolet	161	0	Running	27
11	33	42	Matt Mills	Niece Motorsports	Chevrolet	161	0	Running	26
12	11	7	Stefan Parsons	Spire Motorsports	Chevrolet	161	4	Running	30
13	25	88	Matt Crafton	ThorSport Racing	Ford	161	0	Running	24
14	21	18	Tyler Ankrum (CC)	McAnally–Hilgemann Racing	Chevrolet	161	0	Running	23
15	29	02	Nathan Byrd	Young's Motorsports	Chevrolet	161	0	Running	22
16	24	66	Luke Baldwin	ThorSport Racing	Ford	160	0	Running	21
17	27	76	Spencer Boyd	Freedom Racing Enterprises	Chevrolet	159	0	Running	20
18	31	35	Greg Van Alst	Greg Van Alst Motorsports	Toyota	159	0	Running	19
19	28	33	Frankie Muniz (R)	Reaume Brothers Racing	Ford	159	0	Running	18
20	30	2	Clayton Green	Reaume Brothers Racing	Ford	158	0	Running	17
21	4	15	Tanner Gray	Tricon Garage	Toyota	157	0	Running	27
22	34	74	Caleb Costner	Mike Harmon Racing	Chevrolet	157	0	Running	15
23	18	62	Cole Butcher	Halmar Friesen Racing	Toyota	154	0	Accident	14
24	23	9	Grant Enfinger	CR7 Motorsports	Chevrolet	154	0	Accident	13
25	26	5	Toni Breidinger (R)	Tricon Garage	Toyota	153	0	Running	12
26	20	81	Connor Mosack (R)	McAnally–Hilgemann Racing	Chevrolet	147	0	Accident	11
27	17	45	Bayley Currey	Niece Motorsports	Chevrolet	118	0	Accident	10
28	3	1	Brent Crews	Tricon Garage	Toyota	117	0	Axle	26
29	10	99	Ben Rhodes	ThorSport Racing	Ford	117	0	Accident	8
30	16	44	Andrés Pérez de Lara (R)	Niece Motorsports	Chevrolet	117	0	Accident	7
31	9	17	Gio Ruggiero (R)	Tricon Garage	Toyota	117	0	Accident	8
32	32	22	Mason Maggio	Reaume Brothers Racing	Ford	107	0	Engine	5
33	19	19	Daniel Hemric	McAnally–Hilgemann Racing	Chevrolet	2	0	Accident	4
34	22	26	Dawson Sutton (R)	Rackley W.A.R.	Chevrolet	0	0	Accident	3
Official race results

== Standings after the race ==
Drivers' Championship standings

	Pos	Driver	Points
	1	Corey Heim	4,040
1	2	Ty Majeski	4,035 (–5)
1	3	Kaden Honeycutt	4,034 (–6)
	4	Tyler Ankrum	4,023 (–17)
	5	Layne Riggs	2,297 (–1,743)
	6	Rajah Caruth	2,237 (–1,803)
	7	Grant Enfinger	2,198 (–1,842)
1	8	Chandler Smith	2,179 (–1,861)
	9	Daniel Hemric	2,177 (–1,863)
	10	Jake Garcia	2,148 (–1,892)
Official driver's standings

Manufacturers' Championship standings

Pos	Manufacturer	Points
1	Toyota	925
2	Chevrolet	877 (–48)
3	Ford	865 (–60)

- Note: Only the first 10 positions are included for the driver standings.

Previous race: 2025 Slim Jim 200	NASCAR Craftsman Truck Series; 2025 season	Next race: 2026 Fresh From Florida 250
