= Greg Van Alst =

American racing driver (born 1981)

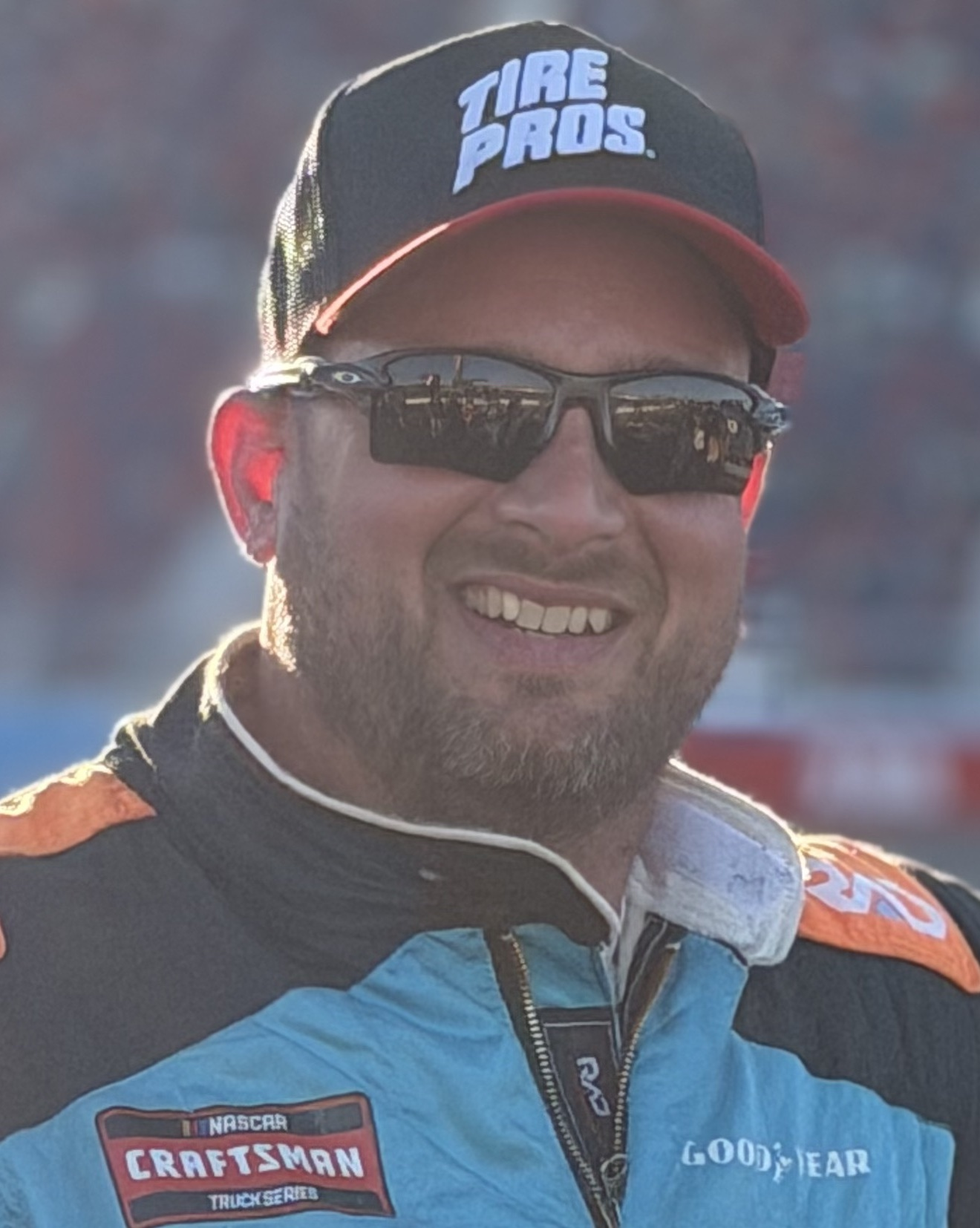
- Van Alst at Phoenix Raceway in 2025
- Born: Gregory Michael Van Alst; July 1, 1981 (age 45); Anderson, Indiana, U.S.
- Achievements: 2019 ARCA/CRA Super Series Champion; 2014 CRA Late Model Sportsman Series Champion

NASCAR O'Reilly Auto Parts Series career
- 15 races run over 3 years
- 2025 position: 100th
- Best finish: 54th (2024)
- First race: 2023 Alsco Uniforms 250 (Atlanta)
- Last race: 2025 Ag-Pro 300 (Talladega)
Wins	Top tens	Poles
0	0	0

NASCAR FedEx Freight Truck Series career
- 9 races run over 2 years
- Truck no., team: No. 35 (Greg Van Alst Motorsports)
- 2026 position: 122nd
- Best finish: 39th (2025)
- First race: 2023 TSport 200 (IRP)
- Last race: 2025 NASCAR Craftsman Truck Series Championship Race (Phoenix)
Wins	Top tens	Poles
0	0	0

ARCA Menards Series career
- 53 races run over 5 years
- Best finish: 5th (2022)
- First race: 2002 Bluegrass Quality Meats 200 (Kentucky)
- Last race: 2024 Reese's 150 (Kansas)
- First win: 2023 BRANDT 200 (Daytona)
Wins	Top tens	Poles
1	26	0

ARCA Menards Series East career
- 10 races run over 4 years
- Best finish: 12th (2022)
- First race: 2021 Bush's Beans 200 (Bristol)
- Last race: 2024 Bush's Beans 200 (Bristol)
Wins	Top tens	Poles
0	6	0

ARCA Menards Series West career
- 3 races run over 3 years
- Best finish: 47th (2023)
- First race: 2022 General Tire 150 (Phoenix)
- Last race: 2024 General Tire 150 (Phoenix)
Wins	Top tens	Poles
0	1	0
- Statistics up to date as of November 6, 2026.

Gregory Michael Van Alst (born July 1, 1981) is an American professional stock car racing driver and team owner. He competes part-time in the NASCAR Truck Series, driving the No. 35 Toyota Tundra TRD Pro for his own team, Greg Van Alst Motorsports. He has previously competed in what is now the NASCAR O'Reilly Auto Parts Series, as well as the ARCA Menards Series.

== Racing career ==
=== ARCA Menards Series ===
Van Alst made his ARCA Re/Max Series debut in 2002, running three races at Kentucky, Chicagoland, and Salem, driving the No. 01 Chevrolet for Robert Locke. He managed his best finish at Chicagoland, coming home in fifteenth.

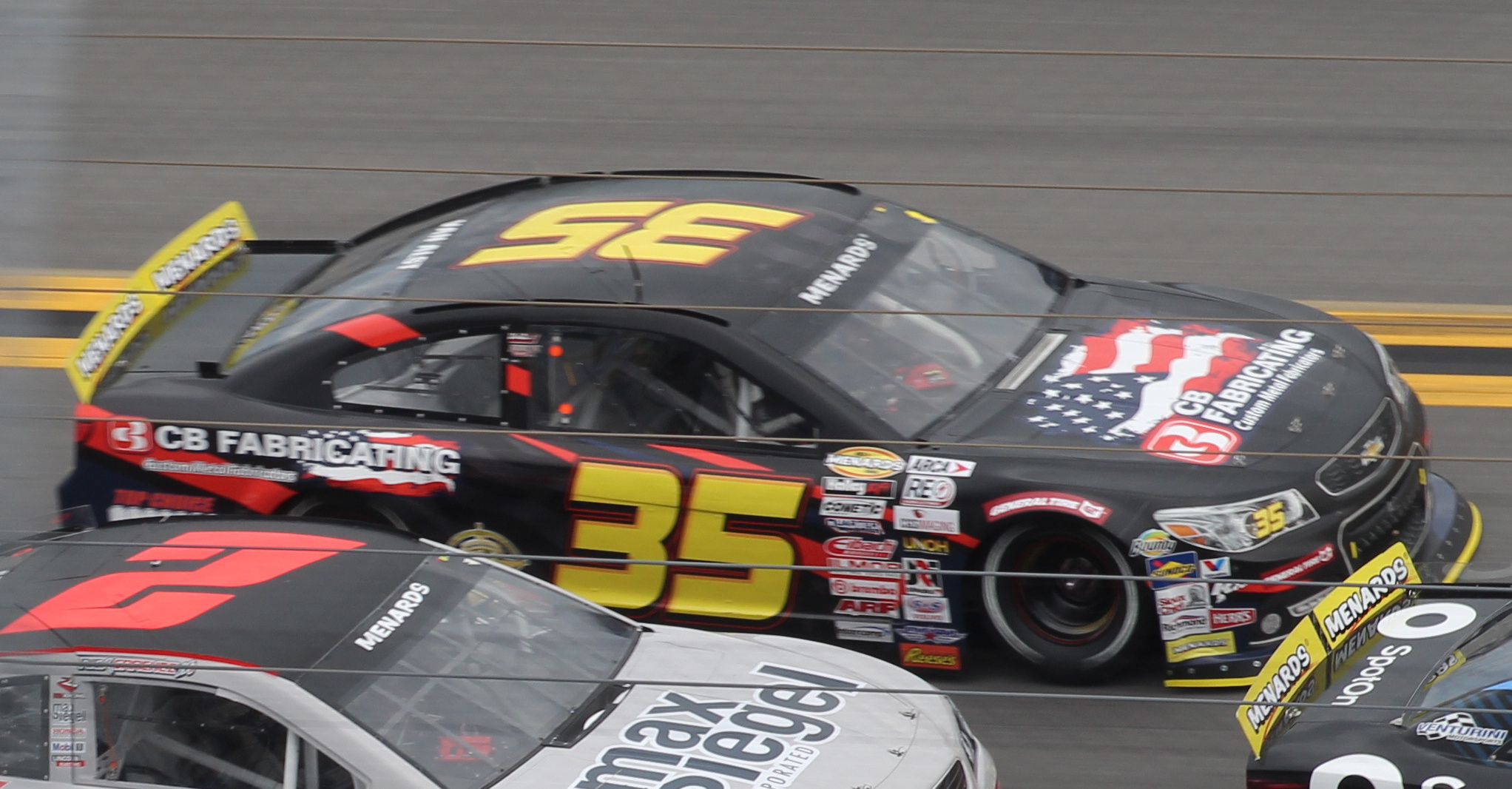
Van Alst's No. 35 car at Daytona International Speedway in 2021

Van Alst would not return to the now ARCA Menards Series until 2021, where he would drive for his own team in the No. 35. Van Alst ran eight races and collected three top ten finishes. He finished seventh at Kansas, second at Winchester, and sixth at Michigan. Van Alst would also make his ARCA Menards Series East debut that year at Bristol, finishing 15th.

In 2022, Van Alst would run full-time in the ARCA Menards Series for the first time, finishing fifth in the final points standings and scoring eleven top-tens with a best finish of fifth at Charlotte Motor Speedway. He would also make his ARCA Menards Series West debut that year in a combination race with the main ARCA Menards Series at Phoenix, finishing 36th due to a handling issue.

In 2023, Van Alst scored his first career win at Daytona after making a pass on Jason White on the final lap of the race. He would then go on to finish tenth in two of the next three races. After finishing 22nd at Charlotte due to a crash with Connor Mosack, Van Alst, who had initially elected to run full-time for that year, decided to cut back his ARCA schedule and run select races for the remainder of the season due to financial limitations.

In 2024, Van Alst stated his intentions to compete full-time. Van Alst opened the season with a third-place finish at Daytona. On July 20, before racing at Michigan, Van Alst revealed he would once again revert to part-time status due to a lack of sponsorship and manufacturer support. He had competed full-time until that point and was third in the points standings. Van Alst would return to race at Bristol and Kansas, ultimately finishing eleventh in the points standings.

On January 27, 2026, it was announced that Van Alst will return to the series at Daytona, driving the No. 19 Chevrolet for Maples Motorsports.

=== NASCAR Xfinity Series ===
On April 22, 2023, Alpha Prime Racing announced Van Alst would make his NASCAR Xfinity Series debut for the team at Atlanta Motor Speedway. After a near spin in qualifying, Van Alst would crash early and finish 38th. He ran the next race at New Hampshire, where he would finish 38th and last once again due to brake issues.

On July 9, 2024, SS-Green Light Racing announced that Van Alst would run his first Xfinity Series race of the season at Indianapolis, where he finished 32nd due to an ignition issue. He would make an additional start with the team at Darlington, where he finished 29th after starting last. He ran three more races for the team at Bristol, Martinsville, and Phoenix, earning his best finish of 26th in the latter.

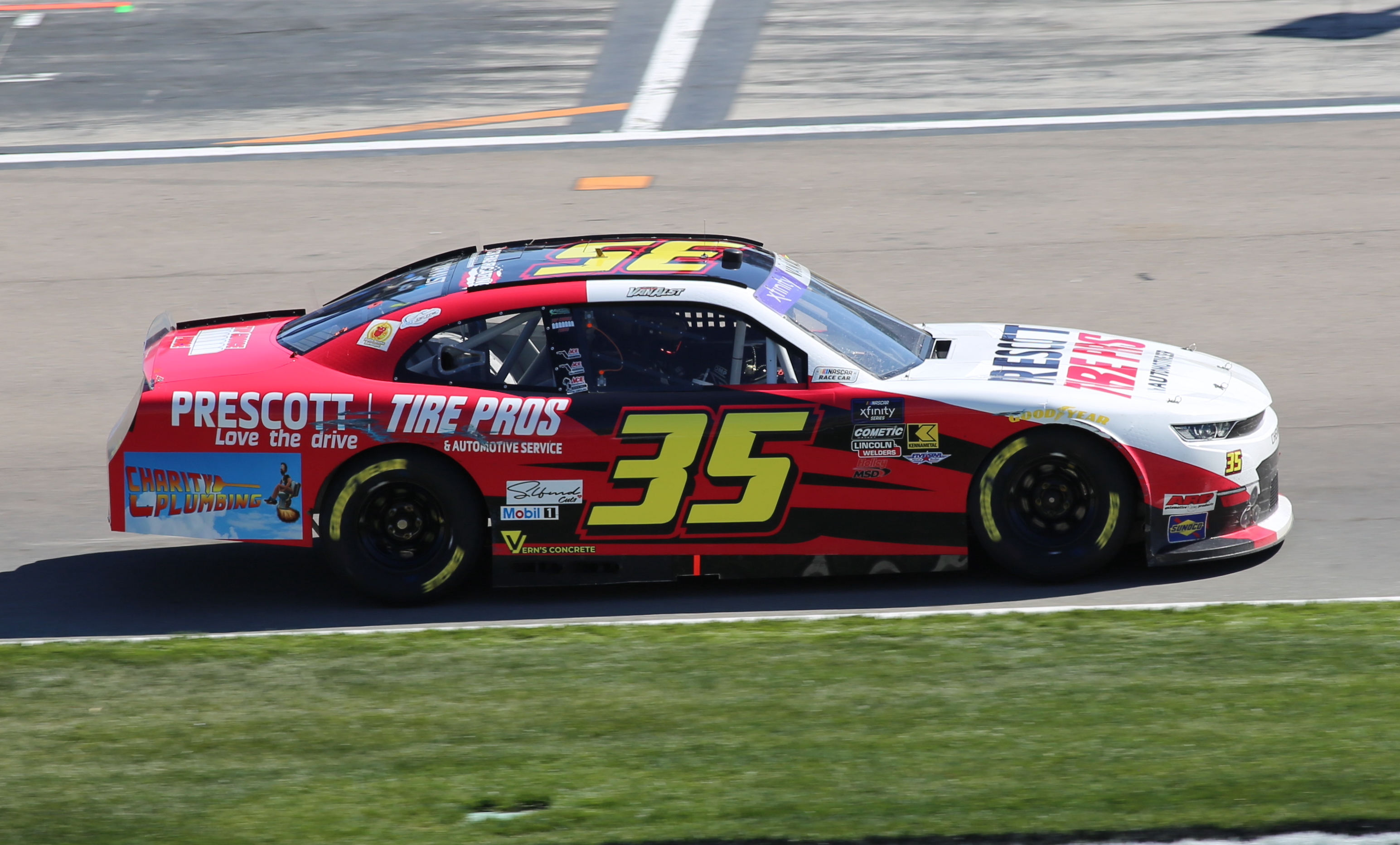
Van Alst's No. 35 car at Las Vegas Motor Speedway in 2025

On December 16, 2024, it was announced that Van Alst would run the majority of the 2025 season with Joey Gase Motorsports, driving the No. 35 car. Van Alst would later downsize his schedule to focus more on his Truck Series team.

=== NASCAR Craftsman Truck Series ===
On August 6, 2023, Van Alst announced that he would make his NASCAR Craftsman Truck Series debut in the race at IRP, driving the No. 20 truck for Young's Motorsports. A few days later, on August 9, it was announced that Van Alst would be driving the No. 20 truck for the rest of the 2023 season. At Talladega, Van Alst suffered a fractured vertebrae from a multi-truck accident.

On July 7, 2025, Van Alst announced he would drive for his own team in four Truck Series races throughout the 2025 season.

As of November 11, 2026, Van Alst put his Truck Series equipment up for sale on Facebook Marketplace.

== Motorsports career results ==
=== Racing career summary ===
Season	Series	Team	Races	Wins	Top 5	Top 10	Points	Position
2002	ARCA Re/Max Series	Robert Locke	3	0	0	0	305	91st
2018	CARS Super Late Model Tour	Greg Van Alst Motorsports	1	0	0	0	0	N/A
2019	CARS Super Late Model Tour	Greg Van Alst Motorsports	2	0	0	0	0	N/A
2020	CARS Super Late Model Tour	Greg Van Alst Motorsports	3	0	1	1	0	N/A
2021	ARCA Menards Series East	Greg Van Alst Motorsports	1	0	0	0	29	47th
2021	ARCA Menards Series	Greg Van Alst Motorsports	9	0	1	3	242	16th
2022	ARCA Menards Series West	Greg Van Alst Motorsports	1	0	0	0	8	70th
2022	ARCA Menards Series East	Greg Van Alst Motorsports	3	0	0	2	151	12th
2022	ARCA Menards Series	Greg Van Alst Motorsports	20	0	1	11	841	5th
2023	ARCA Menards Series West	Greg Van Alst Motorsports	1	0	0	1	31	56th
2023	ARCA Menards Series East	Greg Van Alst Motorsports	2	0	1	2	76	23rd
2023	ARCA Menards Series	Greg Van Alst Motorsports	7	1	2	5	275	17th
2023	NASCAR Craftsman Truck Series	Young's Motorsports	5	0	0	0	23	55th
2023	NASCAR Xfinity Series	Alpha Prime Racing	2	0	0	0	0	NC†
2024	ARCA Menards Series West	Greg Van Alst Motorsports	1	0	0	0	31	56th
2024	ARCA Menards Series East	Greg Van Alst Motorsports	4	0	0	2	116	20th
2024	ARCA Menards Series	Greg Van Alst Motorsports	15	0	1	7	582	11th
2024	NASCAR Xfinity Series	SS-Green Light Racing	5	0	0	0	33	54th
2025	NASCAR Craftsman Truck Series	Greg Van Alst Motorsports	4	0	0	0	48	39th
2025	NASCAR Xfinity Series	Joey Gase Motorsports	8	0	0	0	0	NC†
2026	ARCA Menards Series	Maples Motorsports	0	0	0	0	0	N/A
2026	NASCAR Craftsman Truck Series	Greg Van Alst Motorsports	0	0	0	0	0	N/A

^{†} As Van Alst was a guest driver, he was ineligible for championship points.

=== NASCAR ===
(key) (Bold – Pole position awarded by qualifying time. Italics – Pole position earned by points standings or practice time. * – Most laps led.)

==== Xfinity Series ====
NASCAR Xfinity Series results
Year	Team	No.	Make	1	2	3	4	5	6	7	8	9	10	11	12	13	14	15	16	17	18	19	20	21	22	23	24	25	26	27	28	29	30	31	32	33	NXSC	Pts	Ref
2023	Alpha Prime Racing	44	Chevy	DAY	CAL	LVS	PHO	ATL	COA	RCH	MAR	TAL	DOV	DAR	CLT	PIR	SON	NSH	CSC	ATL; 38																	104th	0^{1}	
2023	Alpha Prime Racing	45	Chevy																		NHA; 38	POC	ROA	MCH	IRC	GLN	DAY	DAR	KAN	BRI	TEX	ROV	LVS	HOM	MAR	PHO	104th	0^{1}	
2024	SS-Green Light Racing	07	Chevy	DAY	ATL	LVS	PHO	COA	RCH	MAR	TEX	TAL	DOV	DAR	CLT	PIR	SON	IOW	NHA	NSH	CSC	POC	IND; 32	MCH	DAY	DAR; 29	ATL	GLN	BRI; 29	KAN	TAL	ROV	LVS	HOM			54th	33	
2024	SS-Green Light Racing	14	Ford																																MAR; 26		54th	33	
2024	SS-Green Light Racing	14	Chevy																																	PHO; 37	54th	33	
2025	Joey Gase Motorsports with Scott Osteen	35	Chevy	DAY; 26	ATL	COA	PHO; 31	LVS; 35	HOM	MAR; 36	DAR; 34	BRI; 32	CAR; 34	TAL; 35	TEX	CLT	NSH	MXC	POC	ATL	CSC	SON	DOV	IND	IOW	GLN	DAY	PIR	GTW	BRI	KAN	ROV	LVS	TAL	MAR	PHO	100th	0^{1}	

==== Craftsman Truck Series ====
NASCAR Craftsman Truck Series results
Year	Team	No.	Make	1	2	3	4	5	6	7	8	9	10	11	12	13	14	15	16	17	18	19	20	21	22	23	24	25	NCTC	Pts	Ref
2023	Young's Motorsports	20	Chevy	DAY	LVS	ATL	COA	TEX	BRD	MAR	KAN	DAR	NWS	CLT	GTW	NSH	MOH	POC	RCH	IRP; 36	MLW; 34	KAN; 32	BRI; 34	TAL; 26	HOM	PHO			55th	23	
2025	Greg Van Alst Motorsports	35	Toyota	DAY	ATL	LVS	HOM	MAR	BRI	CAR	TEX	KAN	NWS	CLT	NSH	MCH	POC	LRP	IRP; 28	GLN	RCH	DAR	BRI; 29	NHA	ROV	TAL; 25	MAR	PHO; 18	39th	48	
2026	Greg Van Alst Motorsports	35	Toyota	DAY; DNQ	ATL	STP	DAR; Wth	CAR	BRI	TEX	GLN	DOV	CLT	NSH	MCH	COR	LRP	NWS	IRP	RCH	NHA	BRI	KAN	CLT	PHO	TAL	MAR	HOM	122nd	0	

^{*} Season still in progress
^{1} Ineligible for series points

=== ARCA Menards Series ===
(key) (Bold – Pole position awarded by qualifying time. Italics – Pole position earned by points standings or practice time. * – Most laps led.)

ARCA Menards Series results
Year	Team	No.	Make	1	2	3	4	5	6	7	8	9	10	11	12	13	14	15	16	17	18	19	20	21	22	AMSC	Pts	Ref
2002	Robert Locke	01	Chevy	DAY	ATL	NSH	SLM	KEN	CLT	KAN	POC	MCH	TOL; Wth	SBO	KEN; 32	BLN	POC	NSH	ISF	WIN; DNQ	DSF	CHI; 15	SLM; 30	TAL	CLT	91st	305	
2021	Greg Van Alst Motorsports	35	Chevy	DAY; 29	PHO	TAL; 26	KAN; 7	TOL	CLT; 14	MOH	POC; 25	ELK	BLN	IOW												16th	242	
2021	Greg Van Alst Motorsports	35	Ford												WIN; 2	GLN	MCH; 6	ISF	MLW	DSF	BRI; 15	SLM	KAN; 14			16th	242	
2022	Greg Van Alst Motorsports	35	Chevy	DAY; 22		TAL; 11																				5th	841	
2022	Greg Van Alst Motorsports	35	Ford		PHO; 36		KAN; 7	CLT; 5	IOW; 8	BLN; 8	ELK; 8	MOH; 12	POC; 15	IRP; 10	MCH; 9	GLN; 13	ISF; 13	MLW; 9	DSF; 6	KAN; 17	BRI; 14	SLM; 7	TOL; 9			5th	841	
2023	Greg Van Alst Motorsports	35	Chevy	DAY; 1		TAL; 32																				17th	275	
2023	Greg Van Alst Motorsports	35	Ford		PHO; 10		KAN; 10	CLT; 22	BLN	ELK	MOH	IOW	POC	MCH	IRP; 7	GLN	ISF	MLW	DSF	KAN	BRI; 5	SLM	TOL			17th	275	
2024	Greg Van Alst Motorsports	35	Chevy	DAY; 3		TAL; 11																				11th	582	
2024	Greg Van Alst Motorsports	35	Ford		PHO; 13		DOV; 8	KAN; 12	CLT; 11	IOW; 23	MOH; 10	BLN; 7	IRP; 8	SLM; 17	ELK; 9	MCH; 6	ISF	MLW	DSF	GLN	BRI; 21	KAN; 20	TOL			11th	582	
2026	Maples Motorsports	19	Chevy	DAY; DNQ	PHO	KAN	TAL	GLN	TOL	MCH	POC	BER	ELK	CHI	LRP	IRP	IOW	ISF	MAD	DSF	SLM	BRI	KAN			N/A	0	

==== ARCA Menards Series East ====
ARCA Menards Series East results
Year	Team	No.	Make	1	2	3	4	5	6	7	8	AMSEC	Pts	Ref
2021	Greg Van Alst Motorsports	35	Ford	NSM	FIF	NSV	DOV	SNM	IOW	MLW	BRI; 15	47th	29	
2022	Greg Van Alst Motorsports	35	Ford	NSM	FIF	DOV	NSV	IOW; 8	MLW; 9	BRI; 14		12th	151	
2023	Greg Van Alst Motorsports	35	Ford	FIF	DOV	NSV	FRS	IOW	IRP; 7	MLW	BRI; 5	23rd	76	
2024	Greg Van Alst Motorsports	35	Ford	FIF	DOV; 8	NSV	FRS	IOW; 23	IRP; 8	MLW	BRI; 21	20th	116	

==== ARCA Menards Series West ====
ARCA Menards Series West results
Year	Team	No.	Make	1	2	3	4	5	6	7	8	9	10	11	12	AMSWC	Pts	Ref
2022	Greg Van Alst Motorsports	35	Ford	PHO; 36	IRW	KCR	PIR	SON	IRW	EVG	PIR	AAS	LVS	PHO		70th	8	
2023	Greg Van Alst Motorsports	35	Ford	PHO; 10	IRW	KCR	PIR	SON	IRW	SHA	EVG	AAS	LVS	MAD	PHO	47th	34	
2024	Greg Van Alst Motorsports	35	Ford	PHO; 13	KER	PIR	SON	IRW	IRW	SHA	TRI	MAD	AAS	KER	PHO	56th	31	

=== CARS Super Late Model Tour ===
(key)

CARS Super Late Model Tour results
Year	Team	No.	Make	1	2	3	4	5	6	7	8	9	CSLMTC	Pts	Ref
2018	Greg Van Alst Motorsports	35	Chevy	MYB	NSH	ROU	HCY	BRI; 22	AND	HCY	ROU	SBO	N/A	0	
2019	Greg Van Alst Motorsports	35	Ford	SNM	HCY	NSH; 30	MMS	BRI; 31	HCY	ROU	SBO		N/A	0	
2020	Greg Van Alst Motorsports	35V	Chevy	SNM	HCY	JEN; 20	HCY	FCS	BRI; 2	FLC	NSH; 23		N/A	0	
