= 2025 NASCAR Xfinity Series Championship Race =

33rd race of the 2025 NASCAR Xfinity Series

Race details
- Race 33 of 33 of the 2025 NASCAR Xfinity Series
- Date: November 1, 2025
- Location: Phoenix Raceway in Avondale, Arizona
- Course: Permanent racing facility
- Course length: 1.022 miles (1.645 km)
- Distance: 200 laps, 200 mi (320 km)
- Scheduled distance: 200 laps, 200 mi (320 km)
- Average speed: 98.509 mph (158.535 km/h)

Pole position
Driver	Brandon Jones	Joe Gibbs Racing
- Time: 27.490

Most laps led
Driver	Justin Allgaier	JR Motorsports
- Laps: 83

Fastest lap
Driver	Brandon Jones	Joe Gibbs Racing
- Time: 28.165

Winner
No. 2	Jesse Love	Richard Childress Racing

Television in the United States
- Network: The CW
- Announcers: Adam Alexander, Parker Kligerman, and Jamie McMurray

Radio in the United States
- Radio: MRN
- Booth announcers: Alex Hayden, Mike Bagley and Todd Gordon
- Turn announcers: Dave Moody (1 & 2) and Kurt Becker (3 & 4)

The 2025 NASCAR Xfinity Series Championship Race was the 33rd and final stock car race of the 2025 NASCAR Xfinity Series. The race was held on Saturday, November 1, 2025, at Phoenix Raceway in Avondale, Arizona, a 1 mile (1.6 km) tri-oval track. The race took the scheduled 200 laps to complete.

In an action-packed race that sparked controversy, Jesse Love, driving for Richard Childress Racing, would survive from early car struggles, and made the championship winning pass on Connor Zilisch with 24 laps to go, leading the remainder of the race to earn his third career NASCAR Xfinity Series win, and his second of the season, clinching his first career Xfinity Series championship. Zilisch fell back to third and finished second in the championship despite a dominating season. Justin Allgaier dominated the majority of the event, leading a race-high 83 laps but fell back on a late restart and was unable to recover, finishing fifth and ranking third in the championship. Carson Kvapil had a struggling day and finished 13th, ranking fourth in the championship. Aric Almirola, who finished in second, would clinch the 2025 owner's championship for the No. 19 car.

This was the fifth and last consecutive championship race held at Phoenix as the event will move to Homestead–Miami Speedway for the first time since 2019. Phoenix will continue to serve as the championship race in the future, but on a rotational deal.

This was the final race with Xfinity as the title sponsor. Starting in 2026, O'Reilly Auto Parts will serve as the new series sponsor. Xfinity and The CW also aired the final stage of the race commercial free.

== Report ==
=== Background ===
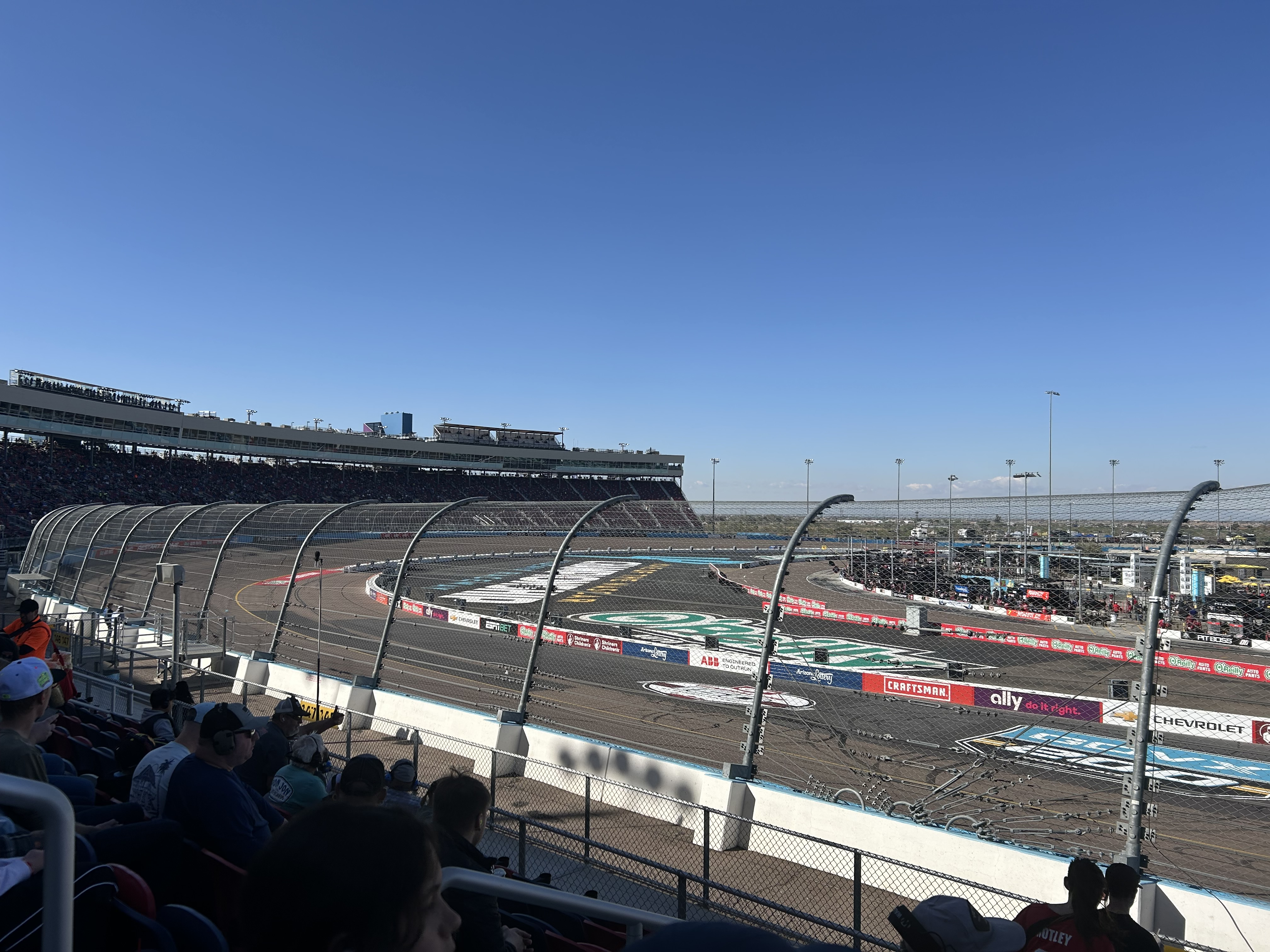
Phoenix Raceway, the track where the race was held.

Phoenix Raceway – also known as PIR – is a one-mile, low-banked tri-oval race track located in Avondale, Arizona. It is named after the nearby metropolitan area of Phoenix. The motorsport track opened in 1964 and currently hosts two NASCAR race weekends annually. PIR has also hosted the IndyCar Series, CART, USAC and the Rolex Sports Car Series. The raceway is currently owned and operated by International Speedway Corporation.

The raceway was originally constructed with a 2.5 mi (4.0 km) road course that ran both inside and outside of the main tri-oval. In 1991, the track was reconfigured with the current 1.51 mi (2.43 km) interior layout. PIR has an estimated grandstand seating capacity of around 67,000. Lights were installed around the track in 2004 following the addition of a second annual NASCAR race weekend.

Phoenix Raceway is home to two annual NASCAR race weekends, one of 13 facilities on the NASCAR schedule to host more than one race weekend a year. The track is both the first and last stop in the western United States, as well as the fourth, and hosts the championship race on the schedule. In 2026, Homestead-Miami would host the championship race, while Phoenix would retain its second date in the Round of 8.

==== Championship drivers ====
- Connor Zilisch was the first of four drivers to clinch a spot in the Championship 4 at Talladega.
- Justin Allgaier clinched the second spot in the Championship 4 at Talladega.
- Jesse Love clinched the third spot in the Championship 4 at Martinsville.
- Carson Kvapil clinched the final spot in the Championship 4 at Martinsville.

==== Entry list ====
- (R) denotes rookie driver.
- (i) denotes driver who is ineligible for series driver points.
- (CC) denotes championship contender.
- (OC) denotes owner's championship car.

#	Driver	Team	Make
00	Sheldon Creed	Haas Factory Team	Ford
1	Carson Kvapil (CC) (R)	JR Motorsports	Chevrolet
2	Jesse Love (CC)	Richard Childress Racing	Chevrolet
4	Parker Retzlaff	Alpha Prime Racing	Chevrolet
5	Glen Reen	Alpha Prime Racing	Ford
07	Patrick Emerling (i)	SS-Green Light Racing	Chevrolet
7	Justin Allgaier (CC)	JR Motorsports	Chevrolet
8	Sammy Smith	JR Motorsports	Chevrolet
10	Daniel Dye (R)	Kaulig Racing	Chevrolet
11	Brenden Queen	Kaulig Racing	Chevrolet
14	Garrett Smithley	SS-Green Light Racing	Chevrolet
16	Christian Eckes (R)	Kaulig Racing	Chevrolet
17	Corey Day	Hendrick Motorsports	Chevrolet
18	Justin Bonsignore	Joe Gibbs Racing	Toyota
19	Aric Almirola (OC)	Joe Gibbs Racing	Toyota
20	Brandon Jones	Joe Gibbs Racing	Toyota
21	Austin Hill (OC)	Richard Childress Racing	Chevrolet
25	Harrison Burton	AM Racing	Ford
26	Dean Thompson (R)	Sam Hunt Racing	Toyota
27	Jeb Burton	Jordan Anderson Racing	Chevrolet
28	Nick Leitz	RSS Racing	Ford
31	Blaine Perkins	Jordan Anderson Racing	Chevrolet
35	Stefan Parsons (i)	Joey Gase Motorsports	Chevrolet
39	Kyle Sieg	RSS Racing	Ford
41	Ryan Sieg	Haas Factory Team	Ford
42	Anthony Alfredo	Young's Motorsports	Chevrolet
44	Brennan Poole	Alpha Prime Racing	Chevrolet
45	Josh Williams	Alpha Prime Racing	Chevrolet
48	Nick Sanchez (R)	Big Machine Racing	Chevrolet
50	Preston Pardus	Pardus Racing	Chevrolet
51	Jeremy Clements	Jeremy Clements Racing	Chevrolet
53	Joey Gase	Joey Gase Motorsports	Chevrolet
54	Taylor Gray (R)	Joe Gibbs Racing	Toyota
70	Leland Honeyman	Cope Family Racing	Chevrolet
71	Ryan Ellis	DGM Racing	Chevrolet
74	Dawson Cram	Mike Harmon Racing	Chevrolet
88	Connor Zilisch (CC) (R)	JR Motorsports	Chevrolet
91	Josh Bilicki	DGM Racing	Chevrolet
99	Connor Mosack (i)	Viking Motorsports	Chevrolet
Official entry list

== Practice ==
The first and only practice session was held on Friday, October 31, at 1:35 PM MST, and would last for 50 minutes. Connor Zilisch, driving for JR Motorsports, would set the fastest time in the session, with a lap of 28.045, and a speed of 128.365 mph (206.583 km/h).

Pos.	#	Driver	Team	Make	Time	Speed
1	88	Connor Zilisch (CC) (R)	JR Motorsports	Chevrolet	28.045	128.365
2	11	Brenden Queen	Kaulig Racing	Chevrolet	28.070	128.251
3	2	Jesse Love (CC)	Richard Childress Racing	Chevrolet	28.082	128.196
Full practice results

== Qualifying ==
Qualifying was held on Saturday, November 1, at 12:30 PM MST. Since Phoenix Raceway is a mile oval, the qualifying procedure used is a single-car, one-lap system with one round. Drivers will be on track by themselves and will have one lap to post a qualifying time, and whoever sets the fastest time will win the pole.

Brandon Jones, driving for Joe Gibbs Racing, would score the pole for the race, with a lap of 27.490, and a speed of 130.957 mph (210.755 km/h).

No drivers would fail to qualify.

=== Qualifying results ===
Pos.	#	Driver	Team	Make	Time	Speed
1	20	Brandon Jones	Joe Gibbs Racing	Toyota	27.490	130.957
2	54	Taylor Gray (R)	Joe Gibbs Racing	Toyota	27.593	130.468
3	00	Sheldon Creed	Haas Factory Team	Ford	27.639	130.251
4	88	Connor Zilisch (CC) (R)	JR Motorsports	Chevrolet	27.644	130.227
5	7	Justin Allgaier (CC)	JR Motorsports	Chevrolet	27.644	130.227
6	2	Jesse Love (CC)	Richard Childress Racing	Chevrolet	27.651	130.194
7	19	Aric Almirola (OC)	Joe Gibbs Racing	Toyota	27.689	130.016
8	48	Nick Sanchez (R)	Big Machine Racing	Chevrolet	27.750	129.730
9	26	Dean Thompson (R)	Sam Hunt Racing	Toyota	27.796	129.515
10	41	Ryan Sieg	Haas Factory Team	Ford	27.802	129.487
11	27	Jeb Burton	Jordan Anderson Racing	Chevrolet	27.817	129.417
12	25	Harrison Burton	AM Racing	Ford	27.830	129.357
13	18	Justin Bonsignore	Joe Gibbs Racing	Toyota	27.834	129.338
14	1	Carson Kvapil (CC) (R)	JR Motorsports	Chevrolet	27.842	129.301
15	17	Corey Day	Hendrick Motorsports	Chevrolet	27.852	129.255
16	21	Austin Hill (OC)	Richard Childress Racing	Chevrolet	27.853	129.250
17	39	Kyle Sieg	RSS Racing	Ford	27.858	129.227
18	8	Sammy Smith	JR Motorsports	Chevrolet	27.895	129.055
19	4	Parker Retzlaff	Alpha Prime Racing	Chevrolet	27.921	128.935
20	11	Brenden Queen	Kaulig Racing	Chevrolet	27.950	128.801
21	16	Christian Eckes (R)	Kaulig Racing	Chevrolet	28.029	128.438
22	99	Connor Mosack (i)	Viking Motorsports	Chevrolet	28.056	128.315
23	31	Blaine Perkins	Jordan Anderson Racing	Chevrolet	28.091	128.155
24	44	Brennan Poole	Alpha Prime Racing	Chevrolet	28.120	128.023
25	70	Leland Honeyman	Cope Family Racing	Chevrolet	28.198	127.669
26	91	Josh Bilicki	DGM Racing	Chevrolet	28.214	127.596
27	42	Anthony Alfredo	Young's Motorsports	Chevrolet	28.262	127.380
28	28	Nick Leitz	RSS Racing	Ford	28.277	127.312
29	51	Jeremy Clements	Jeremy Clements Racing	Chevrolet	28.314	127.146
30	71	Ryan Ellis	DGM Racing	Chevrolet	28.325	127.096
31	07	Patrick Emerling (i)	SS-Green Light Racing	Chevrolet	28.380	126.850
32	14	Garrett Smithley	SS-Green Light Racing	Chevrolet	28.408	126.725
Qualified by owner's points
33	10	Daniel Dye (R)	Kaulig Racing	Chevrolet	28.420	126.671
34	35	Stefan Parsons (i)	Joey Gase Motorsports	Chevrolet	28.504	126.298
35	5	Glen Reen	Alpha Prime Racing	Ford	28.624	125.769
36	53	Joey Gase	Joey Gase Motorsports	Chevrolet	28.636	125.716
37	45	Josh Williams	Alpha Prime Racing	Chevrolet	28.827	124.883
38	74	Dawson Cram	Mike Harmon Racing	Chevrolet	28.966	124.284
Official qualifying results
Official starting lineup

== Race ==
Note: Connor Zilisch, Justin Allgaier, Jesse Love, and Carson Kvapil were not eligible for stage points because of their participation in the Championship 4.

=== Race results ===
==== Stage results ====
Stage 1 Laps: 45

Pos.	#	Driver	Team	Make	Pts
1	54	Taylor Gray (R)	Joe Gibbs Racing	Toyota	10
2	00	Sheldon Creed	Haas Factory Team	Ford	9
3	7	Justin Allgaier (CC)	JR Motorsports	Chevrolet	0
4	88	Connor Zilisch (CC) (R)	JR Motorsports	Chevrolet	0
5	48	Nick Sanchez (R)	Big Machine Racing	Chevrolet	6
6	1	Carson Kvapil (CC) (R)	JR Motorsports	Chevrolet	0
7	39	Kyle Sieg	RSS Racing	Ford	4
8	19	Aric Almirola (OC)	Joe Gibbs Racing	Toyota	3
9	8	Sammy Smith	JR Motorsports	Chevrolet	2
10	20	Brandon Jones	Joe Gibbs Racing	Toyota	1

Stage 2 Laps: 45

Pos.	#	Driver	Team	Make	Pts
1	7	Justin Allgaier (CC)	JR Motorsports	Chevrolet	0
2	88	Connor Zilisch (CC) (R)	JR Motorsports	Chevrolet	0
3	19	Aric Almirola (OC)	Joe Gibbs Racing	Toyota	8
4	00	Sheldon Creed	Haas Factory Team	Ford	7
5	2	Jesse Love (CC)	Richard Childress Racing	Chevrolet	0
6	54	Taylor Gray (R)	Joe Gibbs Racing	Toyota	5
7	48	Nick Sanchez (R)	Big Machine Racing	Chevrolet	4
8	20	Brandon Jones	Joe Gibbs Racing	Toyota	3
9	1	Carson Kvapil (CC) (R)	JR Motorsports	Chevrolet	0
10	41	Ryan Sieg	Haas Factory Team	Ford	1

=== Final Stage results ===
Stage 3 Laps: 110

Fin	St	#	Driver	Team	Make	Laps	Led	Status	Pts
1	6	2	Jesse Love (CC)	Richard Childress Racing	Chevrolet	200	35	Running	40
2	7	19	Aric Almirola (OC)	Joe Gibbs Racing	Toyota	200	0	Running	46
3	4	88	Connor Zilisch (CC) (R)	JR Motorsports	Chevrolet	200	27	Running	34
4	1	20	Brandon Jones	Joe Gibbs Racing	Toyota	200	10	Running	38
5	5	7	Justin Allgaier (CC)	JR Motorsports	Chevrolet	200	83	Running	32
6	18	8	Sammy Smith	JR Motorsports	Chevrolet	200	0	Running	33
7	2	54	Taylor Gray (R)	Joe Gibbs Racing	Toyota	200	44	Running	45
8	3	00	Sheldon Creed	Haas Factory Team	Ford	200	0	Running	45
9	16	21	Austin Hill (OC)	Richard Childress Racing	Chevrolet	200	0	Running	28
10	13	18	Justin Bonsignore	Joe Gibbs Racing	Toyota	200	0	Running	27
11	12	25	Harrison Burton	AM Racing	Ford	200	0	Running	26
12	17	39	Kyle Sieg	RSS Racing	Ford	200	0	Running	29
13	14	1	Carson Kvapil (CC) (R)	JR Motorsports	Chevrolet	200	0	Running	24
14	15	17	Corey Day	Hendrick Motorsports	Chevrolet	200	0	Running	23
15	8	48	Nick Sanchez (R)	Big Machine Racing	Chevrolet	200	0	Running	32
16	21	16	Christian Eckes (R)	Kaulig Racing	Chevrolet	200	0	Running	21
17	9	26	Dean Thompson (R)	Sam Hunt Racing	Toyota	200	0	Running	20
18	24	44	Brennan Poole	Alpha Prime Racing	Chevrolet	200	0	Running	19
19	20	11	Brenden Queen	Kaulig Racing	Chevrolet	200	0	Running	18
20	28	28	Nick Leitz	RSS Racing	Ford	200	0	Running	17
21	30	71	Ryan Ellis	DGM Racing	Chevrolet	200	0	Running	16
22	22	99	Connor Mosack (i)	Viking Motorsports	Chevrolet	200	0	Running	0
23	27	42	Anthony Alfredo	Young's Motorsports	Chevrolet	200	0	Running	14
24	25	70	Leland Honeyman	Cope Family Racing	Chevrolet	199	1	Running	13
25	23	31	Blaine Perkins	Jordan Anderson Racing	Chevrolet	199	0	Running	12
26	37	45	Josh Williams	Alpha Prime Racing	Chevrolet	199	0	Running	11
27	19	4	Parker Retzlaff	Alpha Prime Racing	Chevrolet	199	0	Running	10
28	33	10	Daniel Dye (R)	Kaulig Racing	Chevrolet	199	0	Running	9
29	34	35	Stefan Parsons (i)	Joey Gase Motorsports	Chevrolet	198	0	Running	0
30	36	53	Joey Gase	Joey Gase Motorsports	Chevrolet	198	0	Running	7
31	32	14	Garrett Smithley	SS-Green Light Racing	Chevrolet	198	0	Running	6
32	26	91	Josh Bilicki	DGM Racing	Chevrolet	196	0	Running	5
33	29	51	Jeremy Clements	Jeremy Clements Racing	Chevrolet	196	0	Running	4
34	35	5	Glen Reen	Alpha Prime Racing	Ford	196	0	Running	3
35	31	07	Patrick Emerling (i)	SS-Green Light Racing	Chevrolet	192	0	Running	0
36	38	74	Dawson Cram	Mike Harmon Racing	Chevrolet	191	0	Running	1
37	10	41	Ryan Sieg	Haas Factory Team	Ford	150	0	Accident	2
38	11	27	Jeb Burton	Jordan Anderson Racing	Chevrolet	36	0	Accident	1
Official race results

=== Race statistics ===
- Lead changes: 15 among 6 different drivers
- Cautions/Laps: 4 for 31 laps
- Red flags: 0
- Time of race: 2 hours, 1 minute and 49 seconds
- Average speed: 98.509 mph (158.535 km/h)

== Playoff format controversy ==
Immediately following the race, NASCAR became the subject of controversy and backlash regarding the playoff system. Fans and media criticized NASCAR due to the single-race, championship deciding format that overshadows a driver's full season performance, sparking debate for a future change to the system. This came to attention after Connor Zilisch's dominant season with ten wins and 18 consecutive top five finishes, the most in series history, compared to Jesse Love's two wins and nine top five finishes throughout the season. Due to finishing third behind race-winner Love, Zilisch was unable to clinch the championship.

Ultimately, NASCAR would discontinue the playoffs for all three national series in 2026, replacing it with a revamped version of the Chase format that the Cup Series used from 2004 to 2013.

== Standings after the race ==
Drivers' Championship standings

	Pos	Driver	Points
3	1	Jesse Love	4,040
1	2	Connor Zilisch	4,034 (–6)
	3	Justin Allgaier	4,032 (–8)
2	4	Carson Kvapil	4,024 (–16)
2	5	Brandon Jones	2,240 (–1,800)
	6	Austin Hill	2,230 (–1,810)
2	7	Taylor Gray	2,228 (–1,812)
	8	Sammy Smith	2,222 (–1,818)
1	9	Sheldon Creed	2,218 (–1,822)
5	10	Sam Mayer	2,204 (–1,836)
	11	Nick Sanchez	2,198 (–1,842)
	12	Harrison Burton	2,163 (–1,877)
Official driver's standings

Manufacturers' Championship standings

Pos	Manufacturer	Points
1	Chevrolet	1,278
2	Toyota	1,082 (–196)
3	Ford	1,022 (–256)

- Note: Only the first 12 positions are included for the driver standings.

Previous race: 2025 IAA and Ritchie Bros. 250	NASCAR Xfinity Series; 2025 season	Next race: 2026 United Rentals 300
