= 2025 IAA and Ritchie Bros. 250 =

32nd race of the 2025 NASCAR Xfinity Series

Race details
- Race 32 of 33 of the 2025 NASCAR Xfinity Series
- Date: October 25, 2025
- Location: Martinsville Speedway in Ridgeway, Virginia
- Course: Permanent racing facility
- Course length: 0.526 miles (0.847 km)
- Distance: 253 laps, 133.078 mi (214.168 km)
- Scheduled distance: 250 laps, 131.5 mi (211.628 km)
- Average speed: 63.120 mph (101.582 km/h)

Pole position
Driver	Harrison Burton	AM Racing
- Time: 19.843

Most laps led
Driver	Taylor Gray	Joe Gibbs Racing
- Laps: 52

Winner
No. 54	Taylor Gray	Joe Gibbs Racing

Television in the United States
- Network: CW
- Announcers: Adam Alexander, Parker Kligerman, and Jamie McMurray

Radio in the United States
- Radio: MRN

The 2025 IAA and Ritchie Bros. 250 was the 32nd stock car race of the 2025 NASCAR Xfinity Series, the final race of the Round of 8, and the 6th iteration of the event. The race was held on Saturday, October 25, 2025, at Martinsville Speedway in Ridgeway, Virginia, a 0.526 miles (0.847 km) paperclip-shaped short track. The race was contested over 253 laps, extended from 250 laps due to a green–white–checkered finish.

In an action-packed, wreck-filled race, Taylor Gray, driving for Joe Gibbs Racing, would find redemption from the spring race, and held off Sammy Smith on the final overtime restart to earn his first career NASCAR Xfinity Series win. Gray was dominant in the final stage as well, leading a race-high 52 laps and holding off teammate Aric Almirola. To fill out the podium, Brandon Jones, driving for Joe Gibbs Racing, would finish in 3rd, respectively.

Following the race, Jones, Smith, Sam Mayer, and Sheldon Creed were eliminated from playoff contention. Connor Zilisch, Justin Allgaier, Jesse Love, and Carson Kvapil would advance into the Championship 4.

== Report ==
=== Background ===
Martinsville Speedway, the track where the race was held.

Martinsville Speedway is a NASCAR-owned stock car racing track located in Henry County, in Ridgeway, Virginia, just to the south of Martinsville. At 0.526 miles (0.847 km) in length, it is the shortest track in the NASCAR Cup Series. The track was also one of the first paved oval tracks in NASCAR, being built in 1947 by H. Clay Earles. It is also the only remaining race track on the NASCAR circuit since its beginning in 1948.

=== Entry list ===
- (R) denotes rookie driver.
- (P) denotes playoff driver.
- (OP) denotes owner's playoff car.
- (i) denotes driver who is ineligible for series driver points.

#	Driver	Team	Make
00	Sheldon Creed (P)	Haas Factory Team	Ford
1	Carson Kvapil (P) (R)	JR Motorsports	Chevrolet
2	Jesse Love (P)	Richard Childress Racing	Chevrolet
4	Parker Retzlaff	Alpha Prime Racing	Chevrolet
07	Brad Perez	SS-Green Light Racing	Chevrolet
7	Justin Allgaier (P)	JR Motorsports	Chevrolet
8	Sammy Smith (P)	JR Motorsports	Chevrolet
10	Daniel Dye (R)	Kaulig Racing	Chevrolet
11	Brenden Queen	Kaulig Racing	Chevrolet
14	Garrett Smithley	SS-Green Light Racing	Chevrolet
16	Christian Eckes (R)	Kaulig Racing	Chevrolet
17	Corey Day	Hendrick Motorsports	Chevrolet
18	Justin Bonsignore (Note: After suffering concussion-like symptoms following a wreck at Talladega in the previous week, William Sawalich was replaced by Justin Bonsignore for this race.)	Joe Gibbs Racing	Toyota
19	Aric Almirola (OP)	Joe Gibbs Racing	Toyota
20	Brandon Jones (P)	Joe Gibbs Racing	Toyota
21	Austin Hill (OP)	Richard Childress Racing	Chevrolet
24	Patrick Staropoli	Sam Hunt Racing	Toyota
25	Harrison Burton	AM Racing	Ford
26	Dean Thompson (R)	Sam Hunt Racing	Toyota
27	Jeb Burton	Jordan Anderson Racing	Chevrolet
28	Kyle Sieg	RSS Racing	Ford
31	Blaine Perkins	Jordan Anderson Racing	Chevrolet
32	Austin Green	Jordan Anderson Racing	Chevrolet
35	Takuma Koga	Joey Gase Motorsports	Toyota
39	Ryan Sieg	RSS Racing	Ford
41	Sam Mayer (P)	Haas Factory Team	Ford
42	Anthony Alfredo	Young's Motorsports	Chevrolet
44	Brennan Poole	Alpha Prime Racing	Chevrolet
45	Josh Williams	Alpha Prime Racing	Chevrolet
48	Nick Sanchez (R)	Big Machine Racing	Chevrolet
50	Preston Pardus	Pardus Racing	Chevrolet
51	Jeremy Clements	Jeremy Clements Racing	Chevrolet
53	Mason Maggio	Joey Gase Motorsports	Ford
54	Taylor Gray (R)	Joe Gibbs Racing	Toyota
70	Thomas Annunziata	Cope Family Racing	Chevrolet
71	Ryan Ellis	DGM Racing	Chevrolet
88	Connor Zilisch (P) (R)	JR Motorsports	Chevrolet
91	Myatt Snider	DGM Racing	Chevrolet
99	Connor Mosack (i)	Viking Motorsports	Chevrolet
Official entry list

== Practice ==
For practice, drivers were separated into two groups, A and B. Both sessions were 25 minutes long, and was held on Saturday, October 25, at 1:00 PM EST. Ryan Sieg, driving for RSS Racing, would set the fastest time between both groups, with a lap of 20.392, and a speed of 92.860 mph (149.444 km/h).

Pos.	#	Driver	Team	Make	Time	Speed
1	39	Ryan Sieg	RSS Racing	Ford	20.392	92.860
2	11	Brenden Queen	Kaulig Racing	Chevrolet	20.402	92.814
3	17	Corey Day	Hendrick Motorsports	Chevrolet	20.439	92.646
Full practice results

== Qualifying ==
Qualifying was held on Saturday, October 25, at 2:05 PM EST. Since Martinsville Speedway is a short track, the qualifying procedure used is a single-car, two-lap system with one round. Drivers will be on track by themselves and will have two laps to post a qualifying time, and whoever sets the fastest time will win the pole.

Harrison Burton, driving for AM Racing, would score the pole for the race, with a lap of 19.843, and a speed of 95.429 mph (153.578 km/h).

Preston Pardus was the only driver who failed to qualify.

=== Qualifying results ===
Pos.	#	Driver	Team	Make	Time	Speed
1	25	Harrison Burton	AM Racing	Ford	19.843	95.429
2	1	Carson Kvapil (P) (R)	JR Motorsports	Chevrolet	19.848	95.405
3	19	Aric Almirola (OP)	Joe Gibbs Racing	Toyota	19.869	95.304
4	7	Justin Allgaier (P)	JR Motorsports	Chevrolet	19.886	95.223
5	00	Sheldon Creed (P)	Haas Factory Team	Ford	19.898	95.165
6	21	Austin Hill (OP)	Richard Childress Racing	Chevrolet	19.906	95.127
7	39	Ryan Sieg	RSS Racing	Ford	19.908	95.118
8	11	Brenden Queen	Kaulig Racing	Chevrolet	19.923	95.046
9	16	Christian Eckes (R)	Kaulig Racing	Chevrolet	19.934	94.993
10	4	Parker Retzlaff	Alpha Prime Racing	Chevrolet	19.962	94.860
11	20	Brandon Jones (P)	Joe Gibbs Racing	Toyota	19.983	94.761
12	27	Jeb Burton	Jordan Anderson Racing	Chevrolet	19.983	94.761
13	54	Taylor Gray (R)	Joe Gibbs Racing	Toyota	19.986	94.746
14	18	Justin Bonsignore	Joe Gibbs Racing	Toyota	20.008	94.642
15	8	Sammy Smith (P)	JR Motorsports	Chevrolet	20.012	94.623
16	44	Brennan Poole	Alpha Prime Racing	Chevrolet	20.012	94.623
17	31	Blaine Perkins	Jordan Anderson Racing	Chevrolet	20.026	94.557
18	48	Nick Sanchez (R)	Big Machine Racing	Chevrolet	20.068	94.359
19	91	Myatt Snider	DGM Racing	Chevrolet	20.068	94.359
20	70	Thomas Annunziata	Cope Family Racing	Chevrolet	20.076	94.322
21	2	Jesse Love (P)	Richard Childress Racing	Chevrolet	20.112	94.153
22	10	Daniel Dye (R)	Kaulig Racing	Chevrolet	20.115	94.139
23	17	Corey Day	Hendrick Motorsports	Chevrolet	20.117	94.129
24	41	Sam Mayer (P)	Haas Factory Team	Ford	20.152	93.966
25	71	Ryan Ellis	DGM Racing	Chevrolet	20.179	93.840
26	99	Connor Mosack (i)	Viking Motorsports	Chevrolet	20.202	93.733
27	28	Kyle Sieg	RSS Racing	Ford	20.231	93.599
28	07	Brad Perez	SS-Green Light Racing	Chevrolet	20.241	93.553
29	42	Anthony Alfredo	Young's Motorsports	Chevrolet	20.243	93.543
30	26	Dean Thompson (R)	Sam Hunt Racing	Toyota	20.272	93.410
31	14	Garrett Smithley	SS-Green Light Racing	Chevrolet	20.333	93.129
32	45	Josh Williams	Alpha Prime Racing	Chevrolet	20.409	92.783
Qualified by owner's points
33	24	Patrick Staropoli	Sam Hunt Racing	Toyota	20.454	92.578
34	53	Mason Maggio	Joey Gase Motorsports	Ford	20.456	92.569
35	51	Jeremy Clements	Jeremy Clements Racing	Chevrolet	20.469	92.511
36	35	Takuma Koga	Joey Gase Motorsports	Toyota	20.512	92.317
37	32	Austin Green	Jordan Anderson Racing	Chevrolet	20.558	92.110
38	88	Connor Zilisch (P) (R)	JR Motorsports	Chevrolet	–	–
Failed to qualify
39	50	Preston Pardus	Pardus Racing	Chevrolet	20.470	92.506
Official qualifying results
Official starting lineup

== Post race conflict ==
During the race, drama occurred between Sam Mayer and Jeb Burton. On an earlier restart, Mayer moved Burton up the track, causing him to lose numerous positions, displeasing Burton. Throughout the rest of the event, the two raced aggressively when they got near each other. After taking the checkered flag, Mayer showed retaliation and intentionally wrecked Burton coming into turn one. Although there was no altercation on pit road, both drivers showed displeasure with each other during post-race interviews. Burton and Mayer officially came home with a sixth and seventh place finish, respectively. On October 28, NASCAR suspended Mayer for one race following the incident.

== Race results ==
Stage 1 Laps: 60

Pos.	#	Driver	Team	Make	Pts
1	7	Justin Allgaier (P)	JR Motorsports	Chevrolet	10
2	19	Aric Almirola (OP)	Joe Gibbs Racing	Toyota	9
3	11	Brenden Queen	Kaulig Racing	Chevrolet	8
4	20	Brandon Jones (P)	Joe Gibbs Racing	Toyota	7
5	41	Sam Mayer (P)	Haas Factory Team	Ford	6
6	88	Connor Zilisch (P) (R)	JR Motorsports	Chevrolet	5
7	25	Harrison Burton	AM Racing	Ford	4
8	16	Christian Eckes (R)	Kaulig Racing	Chevrolet	3
9	00	Sheldon Creed (P)	Haas Factory Team	Ford	2
10	17	Corey Day	Hendrick Motorsports	Chevrolet	1

Stage 2 Laps: 60

Pos.	#	Driver	Team	Make	Pts
1	1	Carson Kvapil (P) (R)	JR Motorsports	Chevrolet	10
2	11	Brenden Queen	Kaulig Racing	Chevrolet	9
3	16	Christian Eckes (R)	Kaulig Racing	Chevrolet	8
4	41	Sam Mayer (P)	Haas Factory Team	Ford	7
5	54	Taylor Gray (R)	Joe Gibbs Racing	Toyota	6
6	7	Justin Allgaier (P)	JR Motorsports	Chevrolet	5
7	20	Brandon Jones (P)	Joe Gibbs Racing	Toyota	4
8	19	Aric Almirola (OP)	Joe Gibbs Racing	Toyota	3
9	00	Sheldon Creed (P)	Haas Factory Team	Ford	2
10	42	Anthony Alfredo	Young's Motorsports	Chevrolet	1

Stage 3 Laps: 133

Fin	St	#	Driver	Team	Make	Laps	Led	Status	Pts
1	13	54	Taylor Gray (R)	Joe Gibbs Racing	Toyota	253	52	Running	46
2	15	8	Sammy Smith (P)	JR Motorsports	Chevrolet	253	0	Running	35
3	11	20	Brandon Jones (P)	Joe Gibbs Racing	Toyota	253	0	Running	45
4	5	00	Sheldon Creed (P)	Haas Factory Team	Ford	253	0	Running	37
5	3	19	Aric Almirola (OP)	Joe Gibbs Racing	Toyota	253	51	Running	44
6	12	27	Jeb Burton	Jordan Anderson Racing	Chevrolet	253	0	Running	31
7	24	41	Sam Mayer (P)	Haas Factory Team	Ford	253	32	Running	43
8	30	26	Dean Thompson (R)	Sam Hunt Racing	Toyota	253	0	Running	29
9	38	88	Connor Zilisch (P) (R)	JR Motorsports	Chevrolet	253	0	Running	33
10	14	18	Justin Bonsignore	Joe Gibbs Racing	Toyota	253	1	Running	27
11	1	25	Harrison Burton	AM Racing	Ford	253	16	Running	30
12	6	21	Austin Hill (OP)	Richard Childress Racing	Chevrolet	253	0	Running	25
13	23	17	Corey Day	Hendrick Motorsports	Chevrolet	253	0	Running	25
14	19	91	Myatt Snider	DGM Racing	Chevrolet	253	0	Running	23
15	7	39	Ryan Sieg	RSS Racing	Ford	253	0	Running	22
16	29	42	Anthony Alfredo	Young's Motorsports	Chevrolet	253	0	Running	22
17	33	24	Patrick Staropoli	Sam Hunt Racing	Toyota	253	0	Running	20
18	2	1	Carson Kvapil (P) (R)	JR Motorsports	Chevrolet	253	40	Running	29
19	18	48	Nick Sanchez (R)	Big Machine Racing	Chevrolet	253	5	Running	18
20	17	31	Blaine Perkins	Jordan Anderson Racing	Chevrolet	253	0	Running	17
21	27	28	Kyle Sieg	RSS Racing	Ford	253	0	Running	16
22	25	71	Ryan Ellis	DGM Racing	Chevrolet	253	0	Running	15
23	21	2	Jesse Love (P)	Richard Childress Racing	Chevrolet	253	0	Running	14
24	37	32	Austin Green	Jordan Anderson Racing	Chevrolet	253	0	Running	13
25	26	99	Connor Mosack (i)	Viking Motorsports	Chevrolet	253	0	Running	0
26	4	7	Justin Allgaier (P)	JR Motorsports	Chevrolet	253	37	Running	27
27	9	16	Christian Eckes (R)	Kaulig Racing	Chevrolet	253	0	Running	21
28	32	45	Josh Williams	Alpha Prime Racing	Chevrolet	253	0	Running	9
29	10	4	Parker Retzlaff	Alpha Prime Racing	Chevrolet	253	0	Running	8
30	31	14	Garrett Smithley	SS-Green Light Racing	Chevrolet	253	0	Running	7
31	28	07	Brad Perez	SS-Green Light Racing	Chevrolet	253	0	Running	6
32	34	53	Mason Maggio	Joey Gase Motorsports	Ford	252	0	Running	5
33	22	10	Daniel Dye (R)	Kaulig Racing	Chevrolet	252	0	Running	4
34	35	51	Jeremy Clements	Jeremy Clements Racing	Chevrolet	226	0	Running	3
35	8	11	Brenden Queen	Kaulig Racing	Chevrolet	197	19	Accident	19
36	16	44	Brennan Poole	Alpha Prime Racing	Chevrolet	195	0	DVP	1
37	36	35	Takuma Koga	Joey Gase Motorsports	Toyota	149	0	Carburetor	1
38	20	70	Thomas Annunziata	Cope Family Racing	Chevrolet	120	0	Rear Gear	1
Official race results

== Standings after the race ==
Drivers' Championship standings

	Pos	Driver	Points
	1	Connor Zilisch	4,000
2	2	Carson Kvapil	4,000 (–0)
1	3	Justin Allgaier	4,000 (–0)
1	4	Jesse Love	4,000 (–0)
2	5	Sam Mayer	2,204 (–1,796)
3	6	Austin Hill	2,202 (–1,798)
1	7	Brandon Jones	2,202 (–1,798)
3	8	Sammy Smith	2,189 (–1,811)
2	9	Taylor Gray	2,183 (–1,817)
2	10	Sheldon Creed	2,173 (–1,827)
1	11	Nick Sanchez	2,166 (–1,834)
	12	Harrison Burton	2,137 (–1,863)
Official driver's standings

Manufacturers' Championship standings

Pos	Manufacturer	Points
1	Chevrolet	1,238
2	Toyota	1,047 (–191)
3	Ford	993 (–245)

- Note: Only the first 12 positions are included for the driver standings.

Previous race: 2025 United Rentals 250	NASCAR Xfinity Series; 2025 season	Next race: 2025 NASCAR Xfinity Series Championship Race
