= Christian Eckes =

American racing driver (born 2000)

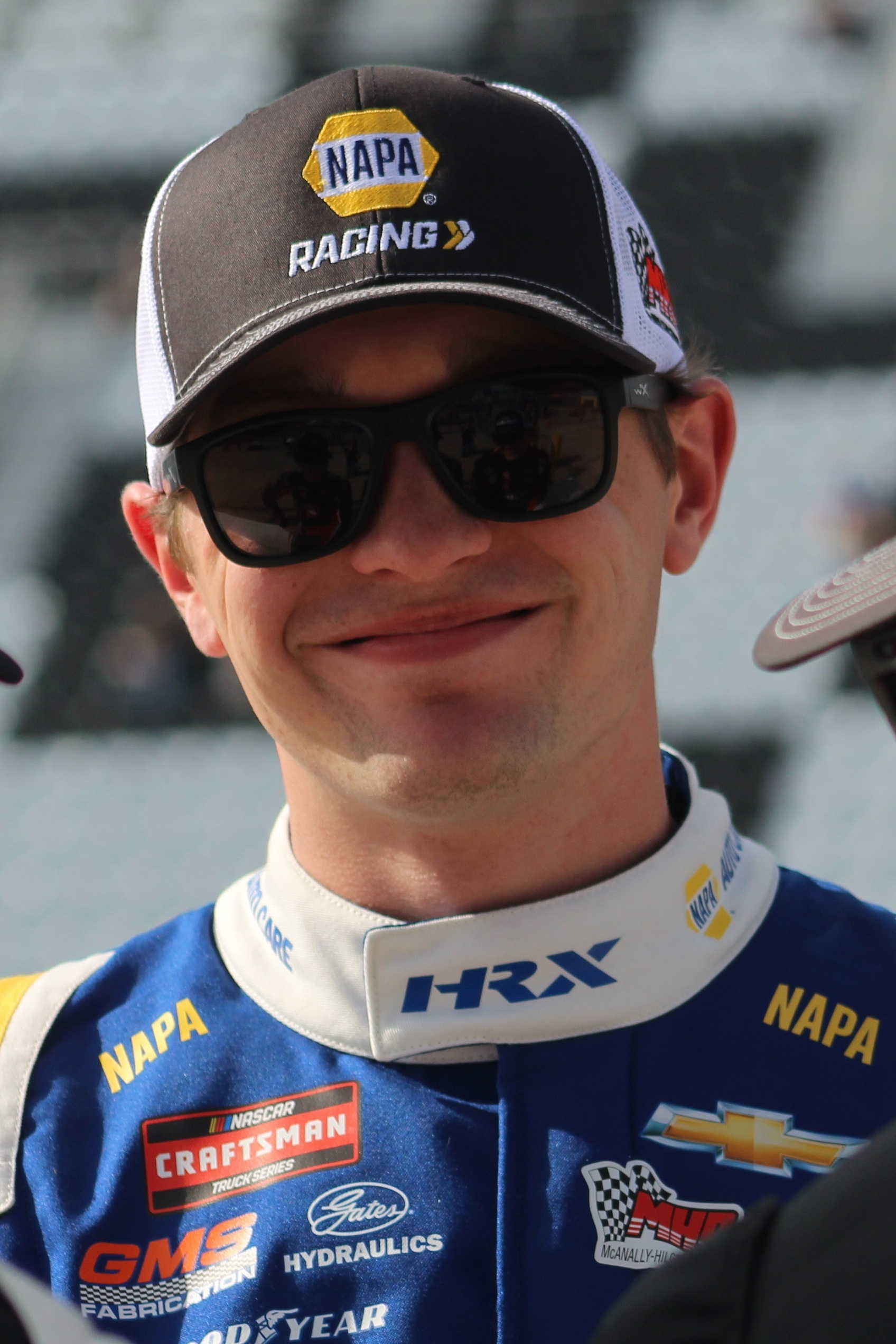
- Eckes at Daytona International Speedway in 2023
- Born: Christian Donald Eckes; November 10, 2000 (age 26); Middletown, New York, U.S.
- Height: 5 ft 11 in (1.80 m)
- Weight: 165 lb (75 kg)
- Achievements: 2024 NASCAR Craftsman Truck Series Regular Season Champion; 2019 ARCA Menards Series Champion; 2016 Snowball Derby Winner; 2016 Myrtle Beach 400 Winner
- Awards: 2016 CARS Late Model Stock Tour Rookie of the Year

NASCAR O'Reilly Auto Parts Series career
- 33 races run over 1 year
- 2025 position: 13th
- Best finish: 13th (2025)
- First race: 2025 United Rentals 300 (Daytona)
- Last race: 2025 NASCAR Xfinity Series Championship Race (Phoenix)
Wins	Top tens	Poles
0	15	0

NASCAR FedEx Freight Truck Series career
- 141 races run over 9 years
- Truck no., team: No. 91 (McAnally–Hilgemann Racing)
- 2026 position: 5th
- Best finish: 3rd (2024)
- First race: 2018 M&M's 200 (Iowa)
- Last race: 2026 Craftsman 200 (Homestead)
- First win: 2021 Victoria's Voice Foundation 200 (Las Vegas)
- Last win: 2024 Zip Buy Now, Pay Later 200 (Martinsville)
Wins	Top tens	Poles
9	90	9

ARCA Menards Series career
- 46 races run over 4 years
- Best finish: 1st (2019)
- First race: 2016 Music City 200 (Fairgrounds)
- Last race: 2019 Kansas ARCA 150 (Kansas)
- First win: 2018 Kentuckiana Ford Dealers 200 (Salem)
- Last win: 2019 Kansas ARCA 150 (Kansas)
Wins	Top tens	Poles
7	35	4

ARCA Menards Series East career
- 3 races run over 1 year
- Best finish: 31st (2016)
- First race: 2016 ComServe Wireless 150 (Dominion)
- Last race: 2016 United Site Services 70 (New Hampshire)
Wins	Top tens	Poles
0	2	0

ARCA Menards Series West career
- 2 races run over 1 year
- Best finish: 31st (2025)
- First race: 2025 General Tire 200 (Sonoma)
- Last race: 2025 Portland 112 (Portland)
Wins	Top tens	Poles
0	1	0
- Statistics up to date as of November 6, 2026.

Christian Donald Eckes (born November 10, 2000) is an American professional stock car racing driver. He competes full-time in the NASCAR Truck Series, driving the No. 91 Chevrolet Silverado RST for McAnally–Hilgemann Racing. He also competed in the NASCAR Xfinity Series and ARCA Menards Series West. Eckes is the 2019 ARCA Menards Series champion, won the Snowball Derby in 2016, and was formerly a development driver for JR Motorsports and later Toyota.

== Early life and family background ==
Christian Donald Eckes was born on November 10, 2000, to George and Darlene Eckes. He has an older sister, Erica. Eckes attended George Washington University Online High School.

== Racing career ==
=== Early racing career ===
Eckes grew up in Greenville, New York. He began racing Legends Cars at thirteen years old and later moved up to racing late model stock cars and super late models. In 2015, Eckes began racing late models for JR Motorsports, as well as super late models for LFR Chassis as one of their driver development program drivers.

=== ARCA Menards Series ===
He made his ARCA Racing Series debut at the Nashville Fairgrounds Speedway in April 2016, driving for Venturini Motorsports. He finished eighth, the only top-ten in four ARCA races that year. Eckes also made his NASCAR K&N Pro Series East debut at Dominion Raceway and ran two further events in the series that year.

Eckes and Venturini remained together for the following two seasons, partaking in ten races of the ARCA Racing Series during 2017 and thirteen the year after. He triumphed for the first time at Salem Speedway in April 2018, keeping teammate Chandler Smith at bay over the closing portion of the event to secure the victory. He followed up with wins at Illinois State Fairgrounds and Indianapolis Raceway Park during the year, making him the driver with the second-most wins that season despite missing seven races.

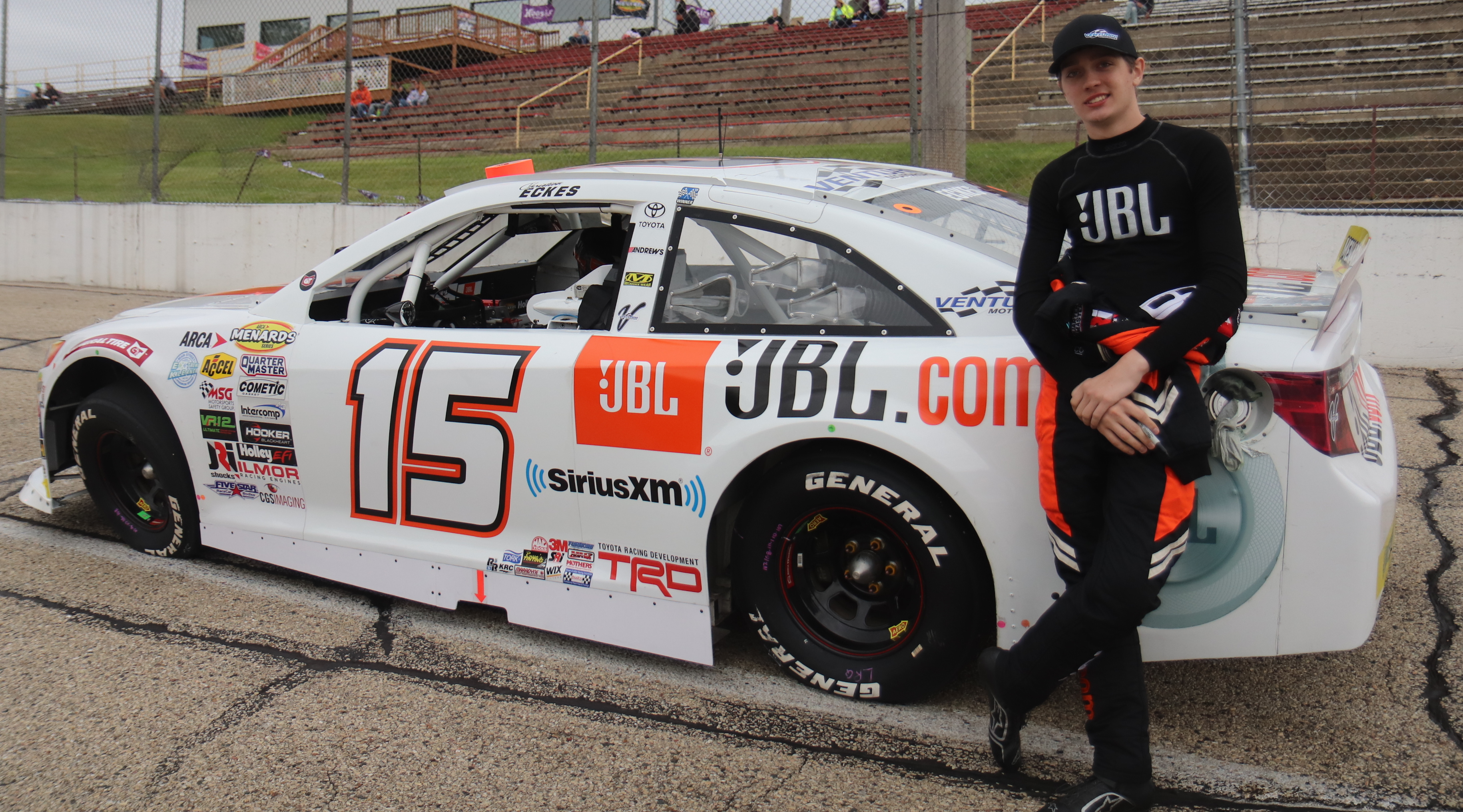
Eckes beside his 2019 ARCA car at Madison

In 2019, Eckes embarked on a full-time campaign in the newly renamed ARCA Menards Series in the No. 15 Venturini car. Despite missing the Salem race in April due to an esophageal tear in his trachea, he went on to win the championship with four wins, thirteen top-fives, and seventeen top-tens in nineteen starts. Eckes was the first ARCA champion to not run every race since Tim Steele in 1997.

=== NASCAR Truck Series ===
==== 2018–2020: Debut seasons with Kyle Busch Motorsports ====
In the week following the win at Salem, Eckes landed a deal with NASCAR Camping World Truck Series team Kyle Busch Motorsports to drive the team's No. 46 entry in four races in the 2018 season, starting at Iowa Speedway in June. He led his first laps in the series at Iowa and took his first stage win during stage 2 at the following race in Gateway, though he later crashed out of the contest. In total, Eckes's first four starts in the Truck Series included 38 laps led and three finishes inside the top ten.

During the same year, Eckes also ran eight races in the Truck Series with KBM's No. 51 truck. Thanks to his three top-five finishes, including a decisive third place at the Homestead season finale, Eckes helped the No. 51 crew towards the owners' championship, which was the seventh for the KBM team overall.

The following year, Eckes joined the team's No. 18 truck for the entirety of the 2020 season. After five results inside the top five, including runner-up finishes at Texas, Kansas, and Michigan, Eckes made the NASCAR playoffs. However, he was eliminated after the first round, retiring in a last-lap pileup at the Talladega cut-off race. Eckes notably had a verbal and physical altercation with Ben Rhodes, who had spun him out on purpose at the fall Texas race. He finished with a winless season and an eighth-place finish in the standings.

==== 2021–2022: Move to ThorSport Racing ====
In 2021, Eckes moved to ThorSport Racing after being replaced at KBM by Chandler Smith. He entered ten races of the 22-race season, sharing the schedule with Grant Enfinger. Eckes managed to finish inside the top five on five occasions and would take his maiden win in the Truck Series at Las Vegas, besting Todd Gilliland during a late restart and being saved from an attack by Ben Rhodes by a caution that ended the race.

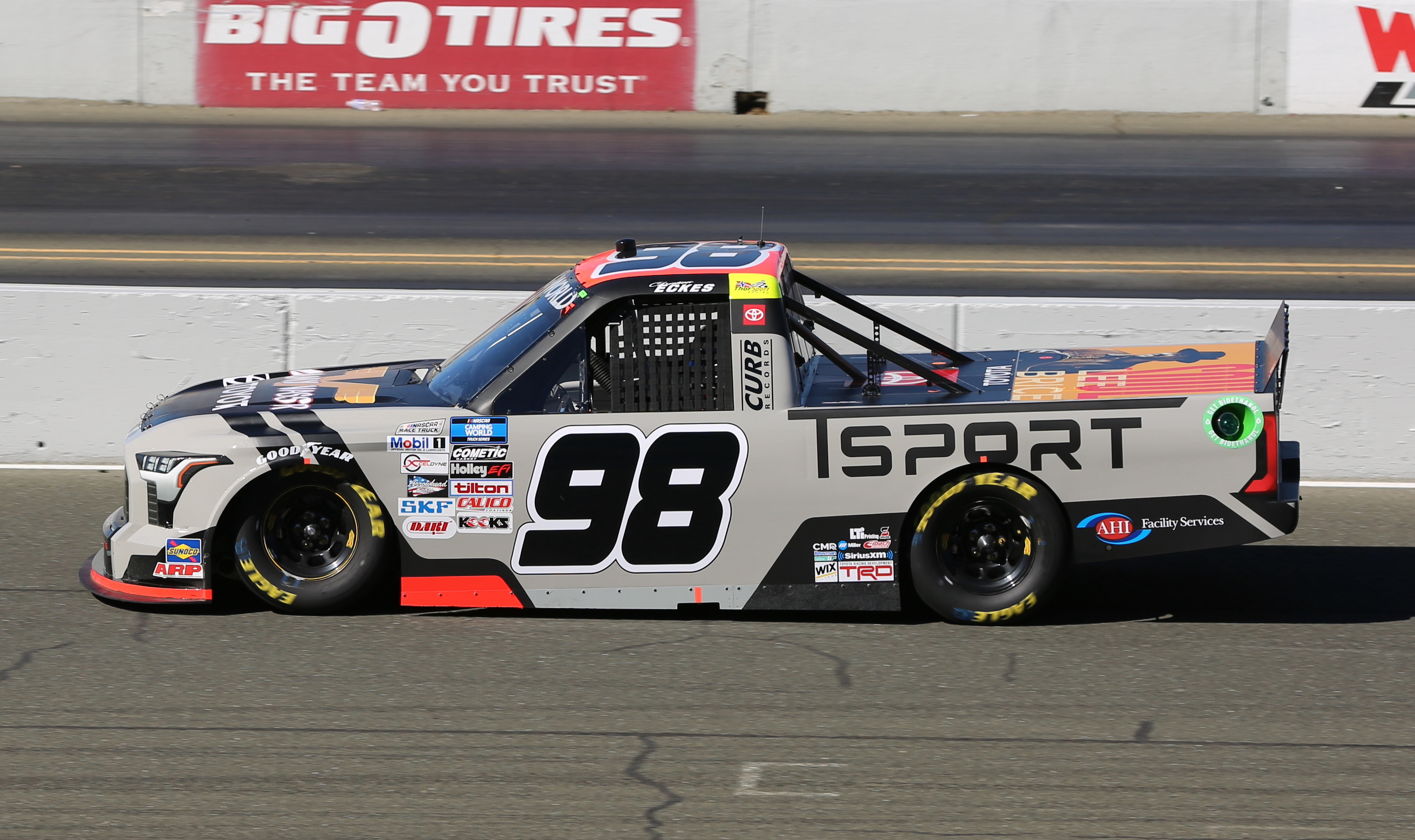
Eckes' No. 98 truck at Sonoma Raceway in 2022

Eckes progressed to a full-time schedule in 2022, driving the No. 98 after Enfinger moved back to GMS Racing. Though he did not win any races that year, Eckes finished eighth in the standings, scoring fifteen top-tens.

==== 2023–present: McAnally–Hilgemann Racing ====
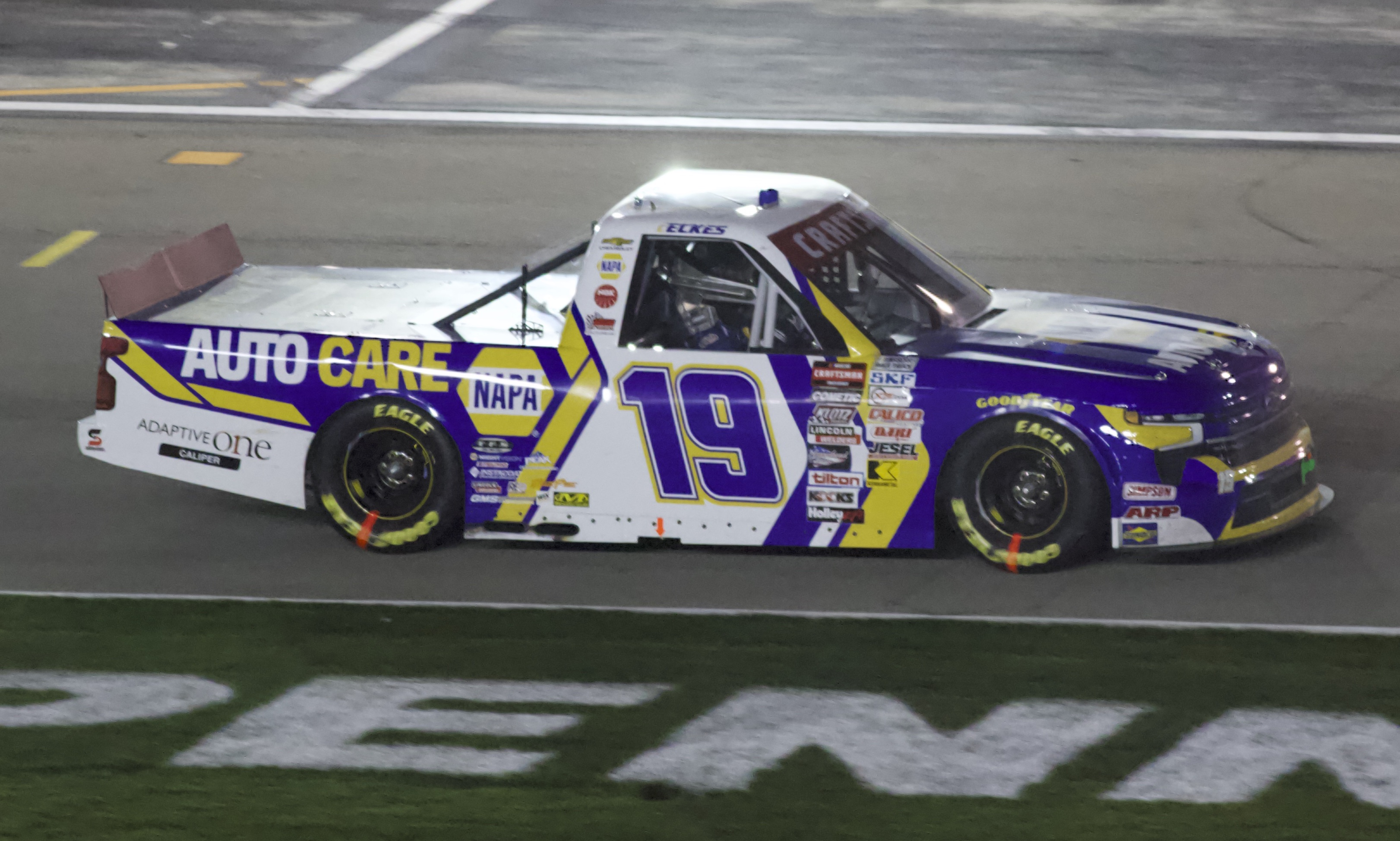
Eckes' No. 19 truck at Las Vegas Motor Speedway in 2024.

On December 6, 2022, McAnally–Hilgemann Racing announced that Eckes would pilot the No. 19 NAPA Auto Care Chevrolet Silverado in 2023, replacing Derek Kraus. Eckes started the season with a third-place finish at Daytona, before going on to win at Atlanta and Darlington — where he triumphed dominantly following five races with either a fifteenth place or a DNF — during the regular season. The first round of the playoffs turned out to be commanding, as Eckes finished second and third at IRP and Milwaukee respectively before making an outside pass on Corey Heim and Zane Smith after a late restart to win at Kansas. However, Heim would get his revenge at Bristol by passing a dominant Eckes with five laps to go; Eckes would finish second. Eckes was eliminated at the conclusion of the Round of 8 at Homestead, having finished twentieth. He won two weeks later at Phoenix and finished fifth in the final points standings.

===== 2024: Title contender =====
Eckes started the 2024 season with a tenth-place finish at Daytona. Throughout the season, he won at Bristol, Martinsville, and Nashville, and claimed the regular season championship. During the playoffs, Eckes won at Martinsville to make the Championship 4, albeit with controversy: though Eckes had dominated the race, winning both stages, a late caution allowed Taylor Gray to pass him during the subsequent restart. Eckes moved Gray up the racetrack aggressively and made a similar move to prevent Ben Rhodes from winning moments later, causing Gray to confront Eckes after the finish. The following week, Eckes finished third at Phoenix to claim third in the standings, being beaten by Heim and eventual champion Ty Majeski who had dominated the event.

In 2025, Eckes made two starts for MHR, driving the No. 16 truck at Richmond and New Hampshire.

===== 2026: Return to full-time =====
On November 20, 2025, it was announced that Eckes will return to the series full-time for MHR for the 2026 season, this time driving the No. 91 Chevrolet.

On November 3, 2026, it was announced that Eckes will return to MHR in 2027.

=== Xfinity Series ===
==== 2025: Rookie season with Kaulig Racing ====
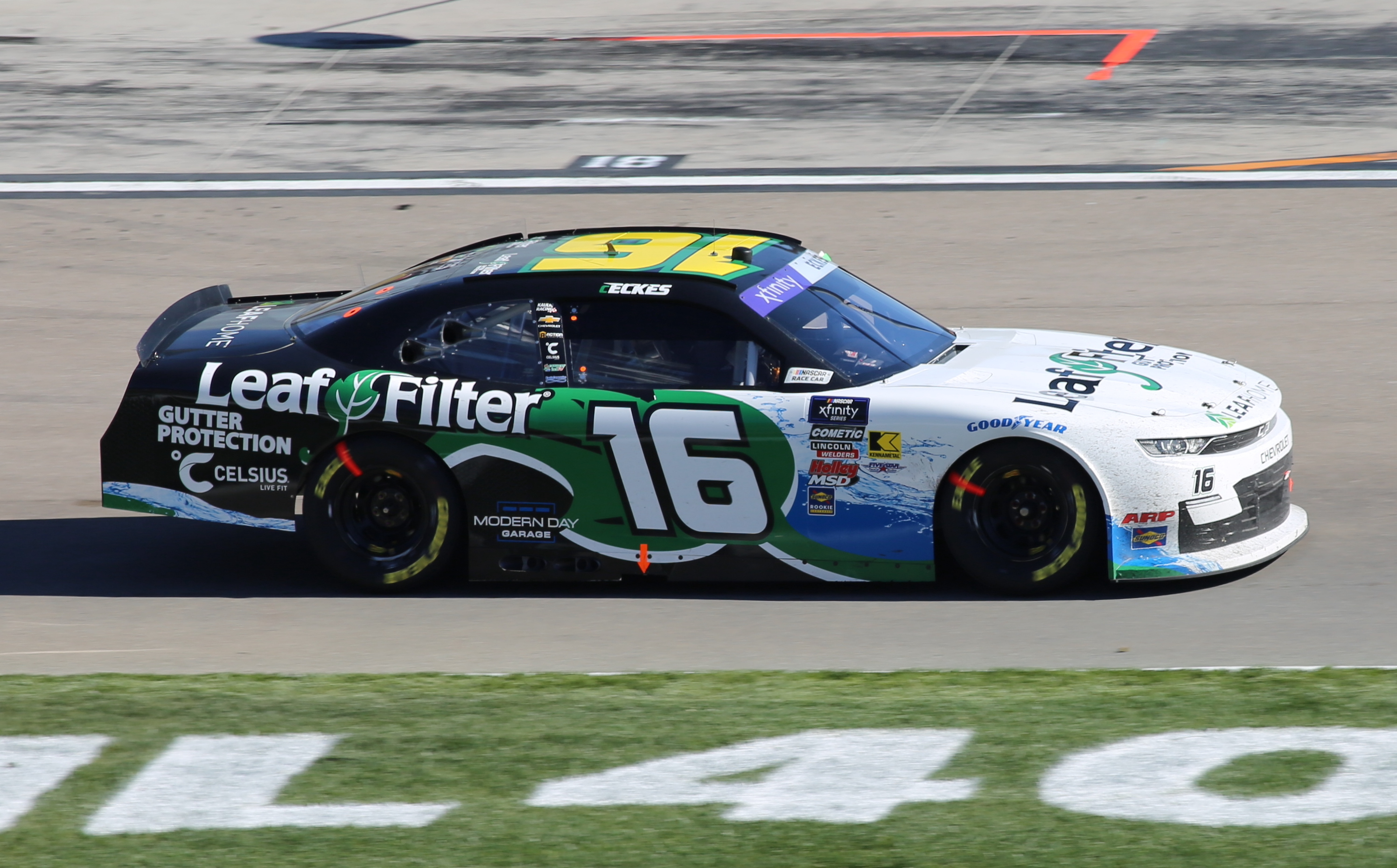
Eckes' No. 16 car at Las Vegas Motor Speedway in 2025

On August 31, 2024, it was announced that Eckes would move up to the NASCAR Xfinity Series full-time in 2025, driving the No. 16 Chevrolet for Kaulig Racing.

=== Other racing ===
In 2016, Eckes had triumph in the Snowball Derby held at Five Flags Speedway where he beat John Hunter Nemechek. Although some reports pegged him as the youngest winner, those reports were erroneous, as Chase Elliott won the event in 2011 at age fifteen while Eckes was sixteen when he triumphed.

== Motorsports career results ==
=== Racing career summary ===
Season	Series	Team	Races	Wins	Top 5	Top 10	Points	Position
2015	CARS Super Late Model Tour	LFR Chassis	2	0	0	1	42	34th
2015	CARS Late Model Stock Car Tour	Empire Racing	1	0	0	0	38	33rd
2015	CARS Late Model Stock Car Tour	JR Motorsports	1	0	0	1	38	33rd
2016	CARS Super Late Model Tour	JR Motorsports	2	0	1	2	57	28th
2016	CARS Late Model Stock Car Tour	JR Motorsports	10	0	5	7	249	4th
2016	NASCAR K&N Pro Series East	LFR Driver Development Group	3	0	0	2	98	31st
2016	ARCA Racing Series	Venturini Motorsports	4	0	0	1	625	40th
2017	CARS Super Late Model Tour	Fury Race Cars	6	0	4	5	173	7th
2017	ARCA Racing Series	Venturini Motorsports	10	0	4	9	1980	16th
2018	ARCA Racing Series	Venturini Motorsports	13	3	6	8	2650	12th
2018	NASCAR Camping World Truck Series	Kyle Busch Motorsports	4	0	0	3	110	35th
2019	ARCA Menards Series	Venturini Motorsports	19	4	13	17	5045	**1st**
2019	NASCAR Gander Outdoors Truck Series	Kyle Busch Motorsports	8	0	3	4	271	20th
2020	NASCAR Gander Outdoors Truck Series	Kyle Busch Motorsports	23	0	7	11	2238	8th
2021	NASCAR Camping World Truck Series	ThorSport Racing	10	1	2	5	263	21st
2022	NASCAR Camping World Truck Series	ThorSport Racing	23	0	8	15	2230	8th
2023	NASCAR Craftsman Truck Series	McAnally–Hilgemann Racing	23	4	10	13	2319	5th
2024	NASCAR Craftsman Truck Series	McAnally–Hilgemann Racing	23	4	15	22	4034	**3rd**
2025	ARCA Menards Series West	McAnally–Hilgemann Racing	2	0	1	1	72	31st
2025	NASCAR Craftsman Truck Series	McAnally–Hilgemann Racing	2	0	0	1	0	NC†
2025	NASCAR Xfinity Series	Kaulig Racing	33	0	6	15	784	13th
2026	NASCAR Craftsman Truck Series	McAnally–Hilgemann Racing	25	0	10	16	2308	5th

^{†} As Eckes was a guest driver, he was ineligible for championship points.

=== NASCAR ===
(key) (Bold – Pole position awarded by qualifying time. Italics – Pole position earned by points standings or practice time. * – Most laps led.)

==== Xfinity Series ====
NASCAR Xfinity Series results
Year	Team	No.	Make	1	2	3	4	5	6	7	8	9	10	11	12	13	14	15	16	17	18	19	20	21	22	23	24	25	26	27	28	29	30	31	32	33	NXSC	Pts	Ref
2025	Kaulig Racing	16	Chevy	DAY; 12	ATL; 29	COA; 5	PHO; 8	LVS; 13	HOM; 38	MAR; 34	DAR; 7	BRI; 9	CAR; 23	TAL; 25	TEX; 38	CLT; 9	NSH; 35	MXC; 4	POC; 3	ATL; 19	CSC; 15	SON; 34	DOV; 10	IND; 13	IOW; 10	GLN; 8	DAY; 32	PIR; 4	GTW; 3	BRI; 8	KAN; 14	ROV; 10	LVS; 18	TAL; 4	MAR; 27	PHO; 16	13th	784	

==== Truck Series ====
NASCAR Truck Series results
Year	Team	No.	Make	1	2	3	4	5	6	7	8	9	10	11	12	13	14	15	16	17	18	19	20	21	22	23	24	25	NTSC	Pts	Ref
2018	Kyle Busch Motorsports	46	Toyota	DAY	ATL	LVS	MAR	DOV	KAN	CLT	TEX	IOW; 8	GTW; 28	CHI	KEN	ELD	POC	MCH	BRI	MSP	LVS	TAL	MAR; 9	TEX	PHO; 9	HOM			35th	110	
2019	Kyle Busch Motorsports	51	Toyota	**DAY**; 22	ATL	LVS	MAR	TEX	DOV	KAN	CLT	TEX	IOW	GTW; 14*	CHI	KEN	POC; 4	ELD; 6	MCH; 15	BRI	MSP	**LVS**; 3	TAL	**MAR**; 17	PHO	HOM; 3			20th	271	
2020	Kyle Busch Motorsports	18	Toyota	DAY; 22	LVS; 23	CLT; 14	ATL; 3	HOM; 8	POC; 33	KEN; 6	TEX; 2	KAN; 13	KAN; 2	MCH; 2	DRC; 12	DOV; 11	GTW; 32	DAR; 5	RCH; 18	BRI; 12	LVS; 8	TAL; 18	KAN; 6	TEX; 25	MAR; 4	PHO; 4			8th	2238	
2021	ThorSport Racing	98	Toyota	DAY	DRC; 10	LVS; 9	ATL	BRD	RCH	KAN; 4	DAR	COA; 35	CLT; 11	TEX	NSH	POC; 12	KNX	GLN; 13	GTW; 31	DAR	BRI	LVS; 1	TAL	MAR	PHO; 6				21st	263	
2022	ThorSport Racing	98	Toyota	DAY; 3	LVS; 28	ATL; 16	COA; 6	MAR; 12	BRD; 5	DAR; 17	KAN; 5	TEX; 2	CLT; 4	GTW; 2	SON; 35	KNX; 12	NSH; 6	MOH; 5	POC; 8	IRP; 16	RCH; 8	KAN; 10	BRI; 8	TAL; 5*	HOM; 7	PHO; 30			8th	2230	
2023	McAnally–Hilgemann Racing	19	Chevy	DAY; 3*	LVS; 6	ATL; 1	COA; 30	TEX; 15	BRD; 30	MAR; 15	**KAN**; 30	DAR; 1*	NWS; 25	CLT; 6	GTW; 2	NSH; 23	MOH; 3	POC; 7	RCH; 11	**IRP**; 2	MLW; 3	KAN; 1	**BRI**; 2*	TAL; 19	HOM; 20	PHO; 1			5th	2319	
2024	McAnally–Hilgemann Racing	19	Chevy	DAY; 10	ATL; 32	LVS; 6	**BRI**; 1*	COA; 8	MAR; 1*	TEX; 4	KAN; 3	DAR; 4	NWS; 6	CLT; 10	GTW; 2	NSH; 1**	POC; 3	IRP; 2*	**RCH**; 2	MLW; 3	BRI; 4	KAN; 3	TAL; 6	HOM; 9	**MAR**; 1*	PHO; 3			3rd	4034	
2025	McAnally–Hilgemann Racing	16	Chevy	DAY	ATL	LVS	HOM	MAR	BRI	CAR	TEX	KAN	NWS	CLT	NSH	MCH	POC	LRP	IRP	GLN	RCH; 12	DAR	BRI	NHA; 9	ROV	TAL	MAR	PHO	89th	0^{1}	
2026	McAnally–Hilgemann Racing	91	Chevy	DAY; 3	ATL; 36	STP; 15	DAR; 3	CAR; 13	BRI; 5*	TEX; 8	GLN; 16	DOV; 7	CLT; 6	NSH; 8	MCH; 32	COR; 9	LRP; 5	NWS; 4	IRP; 33	RCH; 3	NHA; 28	BRI; 30	KAN; 2	CLT; 2	PHO; 2	TAL; 21	MAR; 10	HOM; 2*	5th	2308	
2027	McAnally–Hilgemann Racing	91	Chevy	DAY	ATL	STP	DAR	BRI	TEX	KAN	NWS	CLT	NSS	POC	MCH	LRP	ATL	IRP	BRI	BGS	MSP	NHA	KAN	CLT	PHO	TAL	MAR	HOM			

^{*} Season still in progress
^{1} Ineligible for series points

=== ARCA Menards Series ===
(key) (Bold – Pole position awarded by qualifying time. Italics – Pole position earned by points standings or practice time. * – Most laps led.)

ARCA Menards Series results
Year	Team	No.	Make	1	2	3	4	5	6	7	8	9	10	11	12	13	14	15	16	17	18	19	20	AMSC	Pts	Ref
2016	Venturini Motorsports	66	Toyota	DAY	NSH; 8	SLM	TAL	TOL	NJE	POC	MCH													40th	625	
2016	Venturini Motorsports	15	Toyota									MAD; 14	WIN	IOW; 11	IRP; 26	POC	BLN	ISF	DSF	SLM	CHI	KEN	KAN	40th	625	
2017	Venturini Motorsports	15	Toyota	DAY	NSH; 3	SLM; 8*	TAL	TOL; 8	ELK; 2	POC	MCH	MAD; 5	IOW; 8	IRP; 10	POC	WIN; 2	ISF; 6	ROA	DSF	SLM; 19	CHI	KEN	KAN	16th	1980	
2018	Venturini Motorsports	15	Toyota	DAY	NSH; 8	SLM; 1	TAL	TOL; 21	CLT	POC; 11	MCH	MAD	GTW; 4	CHI	IOW; 11	**ELK**; 2	POC; 13	ISF; 1	BLN; 11	DSF; 4	SLM; 7	**IRP**; 1*	KAN	12th	2650	
2019	Venturini Motorsports	15	Toyota	**DAY**; 4	FIF; 3	SLM; INQ^{†}	TAL; 26	NSH; 1*	TOL; 3	CLT; 7	POC; 3	MCH; 7	MAD; 7	GTW; 2	CHI; 7	**ELK**; 11	IOW; 2	POC; 1	ISF; 2	DSF; 1*	SLM; 2	IRP; 2	KAN; 1	1st	5045	
^{†} – Qualified for the 2019 Kentuckiana Ford Dealers 200 but was replaced by Harrison Burton due to illness

==== K&N Pro Series East ====
NASCAR K&N Pro Series East results
Year	Team	No.	Make	1	2	3	4	5	6	7	8	9	10	11	12	13	14	NKNPSEC	Pts	Ref
2016	LFR Driver Development Group	15	Ford	NSM	MOB	GRE	BRI	VIR	DOM; 7	STA	COL; 9	NHA; 18	IOW	GLN	GRE	NJE	DOV	31st	98	

==== ARCA Menards Series West ====
ARCA Menards Series West results
Year	Team	No.	Make	1	2	3	4	5	6	7	8	9	10	11	12	AMSWC	Pts	Ref
2025	Bill McAnally Racing	19	Chevy	KER	PHO	TUC	CNS	KER	SON; 2	TRI	PIR; 14	AAS	MAD	LVS	PHO	31st	72	

=== CARS Late Model Stock Car Tour ===
(key) (Bold – Pole position awarded by qualifying time. Italics – Pole position earned by points standings or practice time. * – Most laps led. ** – All laps led.)

CARS Late Model Stock Car Tour results
Year	Team	No.	Make	1	2	3	4	5	6	7	8	9	10	CLMSCTC	Pts	Ref
2015	Empire Racing	82	Ford	SNM; 18	ROU	HCY	SNM	TCM	MMS	ROU	CON			33rd	38	
2015	JR Motorsports	9	Chevy									MYB; 10	HCY	33rd	38	
2016	JR Motorsports	1	Chevy	SNM; 12	ROU; 12	HCY; 9	TCM; 21	GRE; 10	ROU; 3	CON; 3	MYB; 4	HCY; 5	SNM; 3	4th	249	

=== CARS Super Late Model Tour ===
(key)

CARS Super Late Model Tour results
Year	Team	No.	Make	1	2	3	4	5	6	7	8	9	10	11	12	13	CSLMTC	Pts	Ref
2015	LFR Chassis	15	Chevy	SNM	ROU	HCY	SNM	TCM	MMS	ROU; 18	CON	MYB	HCY; 6				34th	42	
2016	JR Motorsports	15	Chevy	SNM	ROU	**HCY**; 2*	TCM	GRE	ROU	CON; 10	MYB	HCY	SNM				28th	57	
2017	Fury Race Cars	15	Toyota	CON; 2	DOM; 3	DOM; 7	HCY; Wth	HCY; Wth	BRI	AND; 2	ROU	TCM	ROU	HCY	CON; 3	SBO; 11*	7th	173	

Sporting positions
Preceded by Chase Elliott	Snowball Derby Winner; 2016	Succeeded by Kyle Busch
Preceded by Sheldon Creed	ARCA Menards Series Champion; 2019	Succeeded by Bret Holmes
