= Taylor Gray (racing driver) =

American racing driver (born 2005)

- Gray at Las Vegas Motor Speedway in 2026
- Born: Taylor James Gray; March 25, 2005 (age 21); Artesia, New Mexico, U.S.

NASCAR O'Reilly Auto Parts Series career
- 79 races run over 3 years
- Car no., team: No. 54 (Joe Gibbs Racing)
- 2026 position: 9th
- Best finish: 7th (2025)
- First race: 2024 ToyotaCare 250 (Richmond)
- Last race: 2026 O'Reilly Auto Parts 300 (Homestead)
- First win: 2025 IAA and Ritchie Bros. 250 (Martinsville)
- Last win: 2026 Kansas Lottery 300 (Kansas)
Wins	Top tens	Poles
2	33	4

NASCAR FedEx Freight Truck Series career
- 57 races run over 5 years
- 2026 position: 117th
- Best finish: 6th (2024)
- First race: 2021 United Rentals 176 at The Glen (Watkins Glen)
- Last race: 2026 Fresh From Florida 250 (Daytona)
Wins	Top tens	Poles
0	22	0

ARCA Menards Series career
- 40 races run over 4 years
- Best finish: 8th (2021)
- First race: 2020 Calypso Lemonade 200 (IRP)
- Last race: 2023 General Tire 150 (Charlotte)
- First win: 2022 General Tire 150 (Phoenix)
- Last win: 2022 General Tire Delivers 200 (Pocono)
Wins	Top tens	Poles
3	36	1

ARCA Menards Series East career
- 17 races run over 3 years
- Best finish: 2nd (2022)
- First race: 2020 Herr's Potato Chips 200 (Toledo)
- Last race: 2022 Bush's Beans 200 (Bristol)
- First win: 2022 General Tire 125 (Dover)
Wins	Top tens	Poles
1	16	2

ARCA Menards Series West career
- 13 races run over 3 years
- Best finish: 12th (2021)
- First race: 2020 ENEOS/Sunrise Ford Twin 30 Race #1 (Tooele)
- Last race: 2022 Desert Diamond Casino West Valley 100 (Phoenix)
- First win: 2020 NAPA/ENEOS 125 (Kern County)
- Last win: 2022 Star Nursery 150 (Las Vegas)
Wins	Top tens	Poles
5	10	2
- Statistics up to date as of November 7, 2026.

Taylor James Gray (born March 25, 2005) is an American professional stock car racing driver. He competes full-time in the NASCAR O'Reilly Auto Parts Series, driving the No. 54 Toyota GR Supra for Joe Gibbs Racing. He has previously competed in the NASCAR Craftsman Truck Series, ARCA Menards Series, ARCA Menards Series East, and ARCA Menards Series West.

== Racing career ==
=== Early career ===
Gray made his debut in a late model in March 2018 at the age of twelve, driving for Lee Faulk Racing and Development at Hickory Motor Speedway in the Paramount Auto Group Limited Late Model Series. He had an impressive showing, finishing sixth in the race. Two months later, he returned to Hickory in the same series and won his first late model race after running in either first or second place for the entire race.

Both Gray and his brother Tanner were signed by DGR-Crosley in 2019, with Tanner driving full-time in the K&N Pro Series East and Taylor driving full-time in the CARS Late Model Stock Tour since he was under the age of fifteen and therefore not eligible to compete in a NASCAR series at that time.

In his season racing in CARS, Gray picked up a win at Hickory Motor Speedway in just his second start, which meant he now had two wins at the track. Gray ended the year ninth in points, competing in all but two races, which he skipped mid-season. Additionally, he entered the ValleyStar Credit Union 300 NASCAR Whelen All-American Series race at Martinsville, where he flipped, and his car came to a halt upside down, but he was uninjured in the crash. Just a few weeks later, he was already back in action, again at Hickory, where he ran the Whelen All-American Series' Fall Brawl event. Gray would have an outstanding performance, leading all 200 laps in the race en route to the win, and this put him with a total of three wins there at only the age of fourteen.

=== ARCA Series ===
==== 2020: DGR-Crosley ====
On December 18, 2019, it was announced that Gray would drive all races in the ARCA Menards Series East (formerly the K&N Pro Series East) in 2020 with DGR in their No. 17 Ford (the team switched manufacturers from Toyota) once turning fifteen on March 25 of that year. In addition, he will run the nine races of the ten-race ARCA Menards Series Sioux Chief Showdown that he will be able to compete in after he becomes eligible to race in the series. His older brother subbed for him at the season-opener at New Smyrna, and Bubba Pollard was announced to fill in at the following race at Five Flags. However, the Five Flags race, along with all others through May, was postponed due to the coronavirus outbreak, which means Gray would be fifteen when the rescheduled race is run and eligible to compete in it after all. DGR has yet to announce who will drive the No. 17 car at that one race as a result of this, but since Gray is running full-time for the championship, they presumably would move Pollard to a second car for the team, which has been announced to be fielded in select races sometime in the season for Tanner Gray.

Gray also returned to the CARS Series part-time in 2020, winning their season-opener at Southern National Motorsports Park.

==== 2021–2022: David Gilliland Racing ====
On January 15, 2021, Gray was penalized for recording a video on his cell phone while on the track for an official ARCA test session at Daytona, a violation of the series rulebook's Section 20C – 6.7 (restriction of onboard devices, including cell phones). occurred during an official ARCA Menards Series test session at Daytona International Speedway. Gray was placed on probation for the rest of the season and fined $1,000.

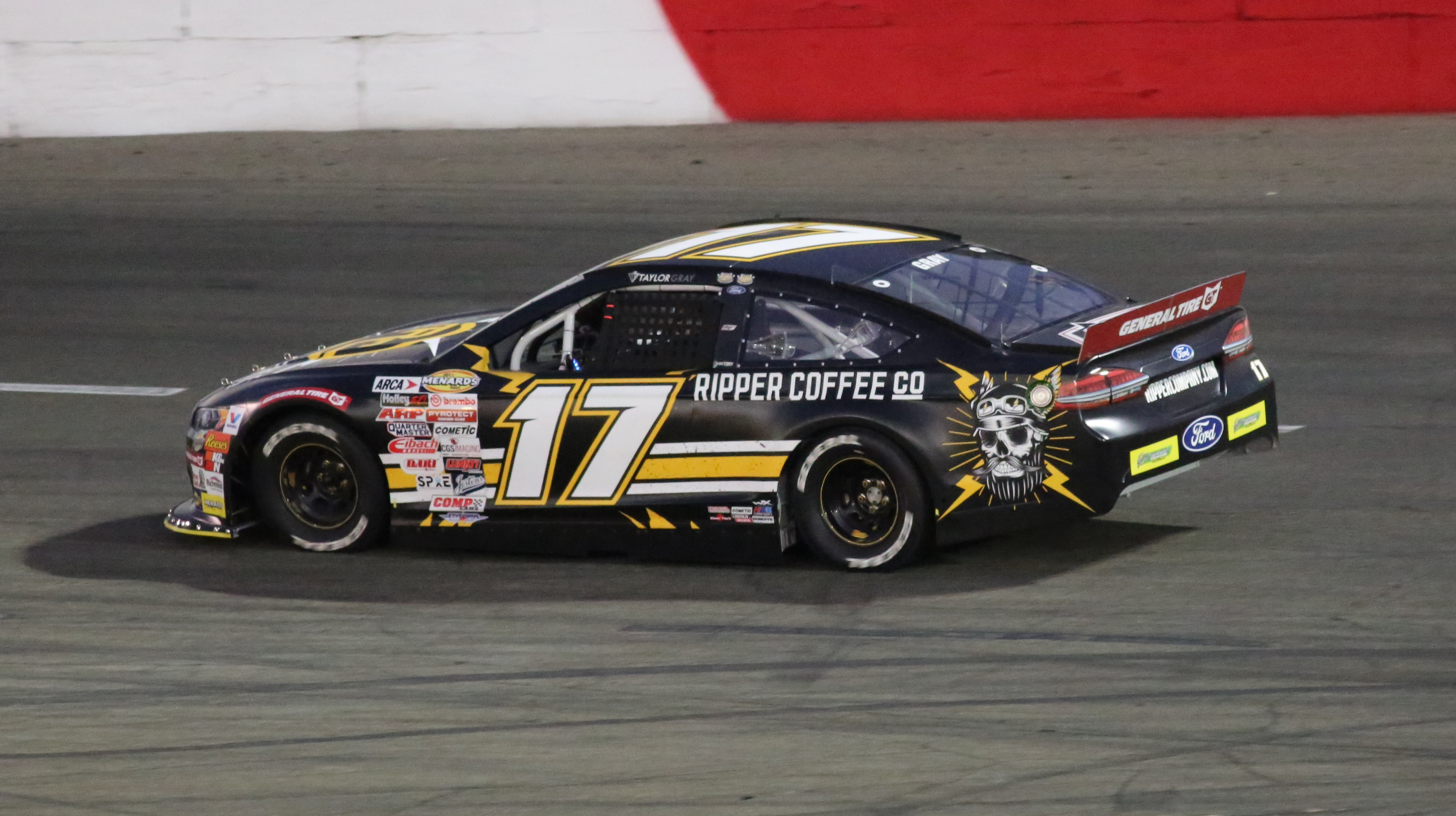
Gray at the All American Speedway in 2021.

Gray returned for another full-time season in the East Series in the No. 17 for the renamed David Gilliland Racing. He finished third in the season-opening race at New Smyrna Speedway in a photo finish with race winner Max Gutiérrez and second-place finisher Sammy Smith.

After being involved in a single-car accident in Statesville, North Carolina, on April 8, he was officially cleared to return on July 6, allowing him to run the weekend's ARCA race at Elko Speedway.

After ARCA West Rookie Jake Drew was penalized in the Portland 112 along with Eric Nascimento, Gray won his second ARCA West race. He later won at the Star Nursery 150.

On March 8, 2022, a hauler carrying Gray's car on its way to Phoenix Raceway collided with a Honda Passport near Longview, Texas, killing hauler driver Steven C. Stotts. Two passengers in the hauler and the driver of the SUV survived the accident. Three days later on March 11, Gray won the General Tire 150 after starting second and leading 43 laps, dedicating the win to Stotts. He also won the ARCA East race at Dover with the new Ford Mustang body. He also scored wins at Mid-Ohio and Pocono throughout the season, along with another ARCA West win at the Las Vegas Motor Speedway Bullring.

==== 2023: Joe Gibbs Racing and Tricon Garage ====
Gray returned to the ARCA Series in 2023, driving the No. 18 car for Joe Gibbs Racing at Talladega, and the newly renamed Tricon Garage No. 17 car at Kansas and Charlotte.

=== Craftsman Truck Series ===
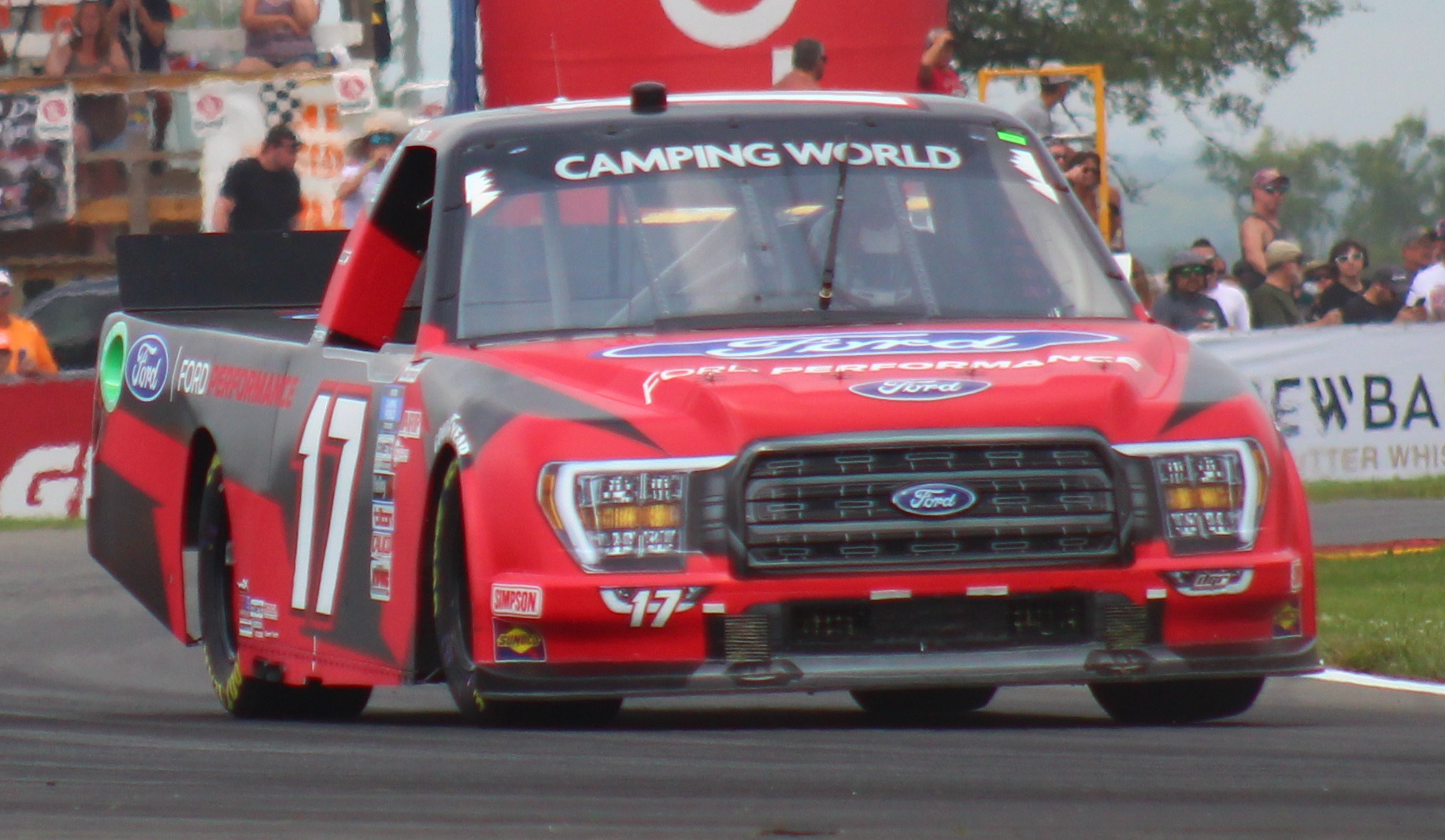
Gray in his Truck Series debut at Watkins Glen in 2021.

==== 2021–2022: David Gilliland Racing ====
In 2021, Gray was originally scheduled to make his NASCAR Camping World Truck Series debut at Richmond Raceway in April for David Gilliland Racing, but on April 8, he suffered a fractured L4 vertebra, left foot, and ankle in a single-car accident in Statesville, North Carolina, forcing him to miss his debut. He later made his Truck debut at Watkins Glen International, finishing in 35th. He ran five races that season and earned the best finish of eighth at Martinsville.

Gray increased his schedule to eight races in 2022. At the Lucas Oil Indianapolis Raceway Park in July, Gray was in contention of earning his first career win, leading the race until he got spun by John Hunter Nemechek with two laps to go. He had a best finish of sixth at Richmond late in the year.

==== 2023–2024: Tricon Garage ====
On October 27, 2022, David Gilliland Racing announced that they would be moving to Toyota Racing Development in 2023, and renaming to Tricon Garage (with Tricon styled in all-capital letters). Gray would remain with the team for a full season and compete for Rookie of the Year. He missed the first three races of the season due to age restrictions but received a playoff waiver to stay eligible for the playoffs. He earned four top-tens throughout the regular season, including a third-place run at Pocono, but failed to make the playoffs. During the playoffs, he scored two consecutive top-five finishes at Kansas and Bristol, finishing second and fifth, respectively. He ended the season fifteenth in points.

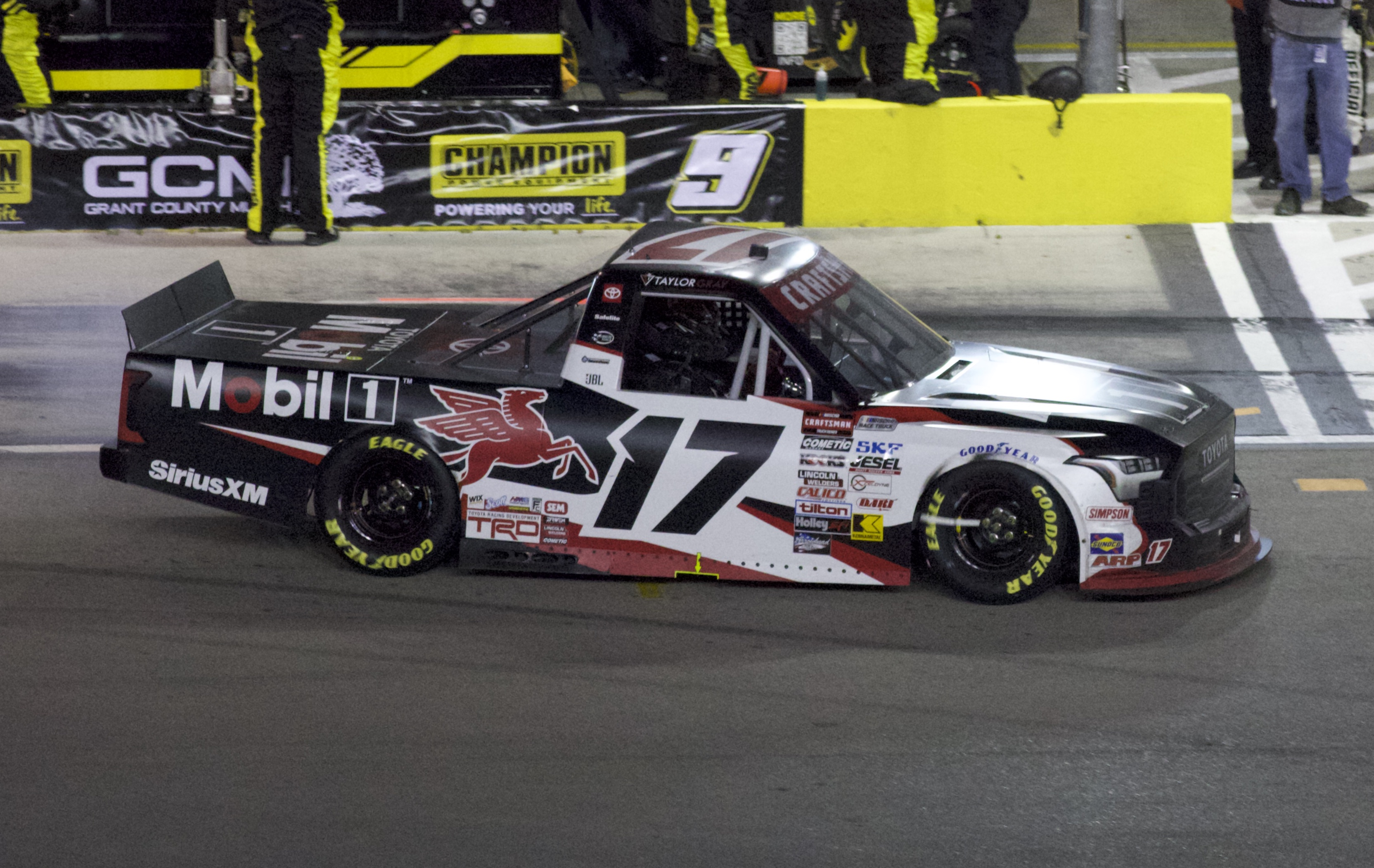
Gray's No. 17 truck at Las Vegas Motor Speedway in 2024.

On November 10, 2023, it was announced that Gray would return to Tricon Garage in 2024, running his first full season.

During the 2024 Truck Series opening race at Daytona, Gray was involved in a flip. On the last lap of the race, Gray was in position for the win off of turn 2 when the truck beside Gray in Jack Wood got turned by Rajah Caruth, which turned Wood into Gray, and Gray spun. Gray's truck hit the outside wall before he got t-boned in the driver side door by Daniel Dye at an angle which lifted Gray's truck off the ground and did a barrel roll on top of two trucks with both being Christian Eckes and his brother Tanner before the truck landed on the hood of another truck in Bayley Currey and on all four wheels on the pavement. Gray was able to walk out under his own power uninjured and also expressed his displeasure at Caruth in his interview. Due to his consistency throughout the regular season, Gray would make the Playoffs for the first time. At The Martinsville Playoff race, Gray was leading with 5 laps to go and had a shot at winning and making it into the Championship 4. However, entering turn 3, Christian Eckes would make contact with Gray, which sent the latter up the track, costing him the win. Eckes would go on to win after dominating. Gray went on to finish fourth and would come up just short of making the Final 4. After the race, Gray would confront Eckes and would get into a heated argument with him.

==== 2026: One-off at Daytona ====
Tricon Garage signed Gray for the season-opener at Daytona. He finished 28th.

=== O'Reilly Auto Parts Series ===
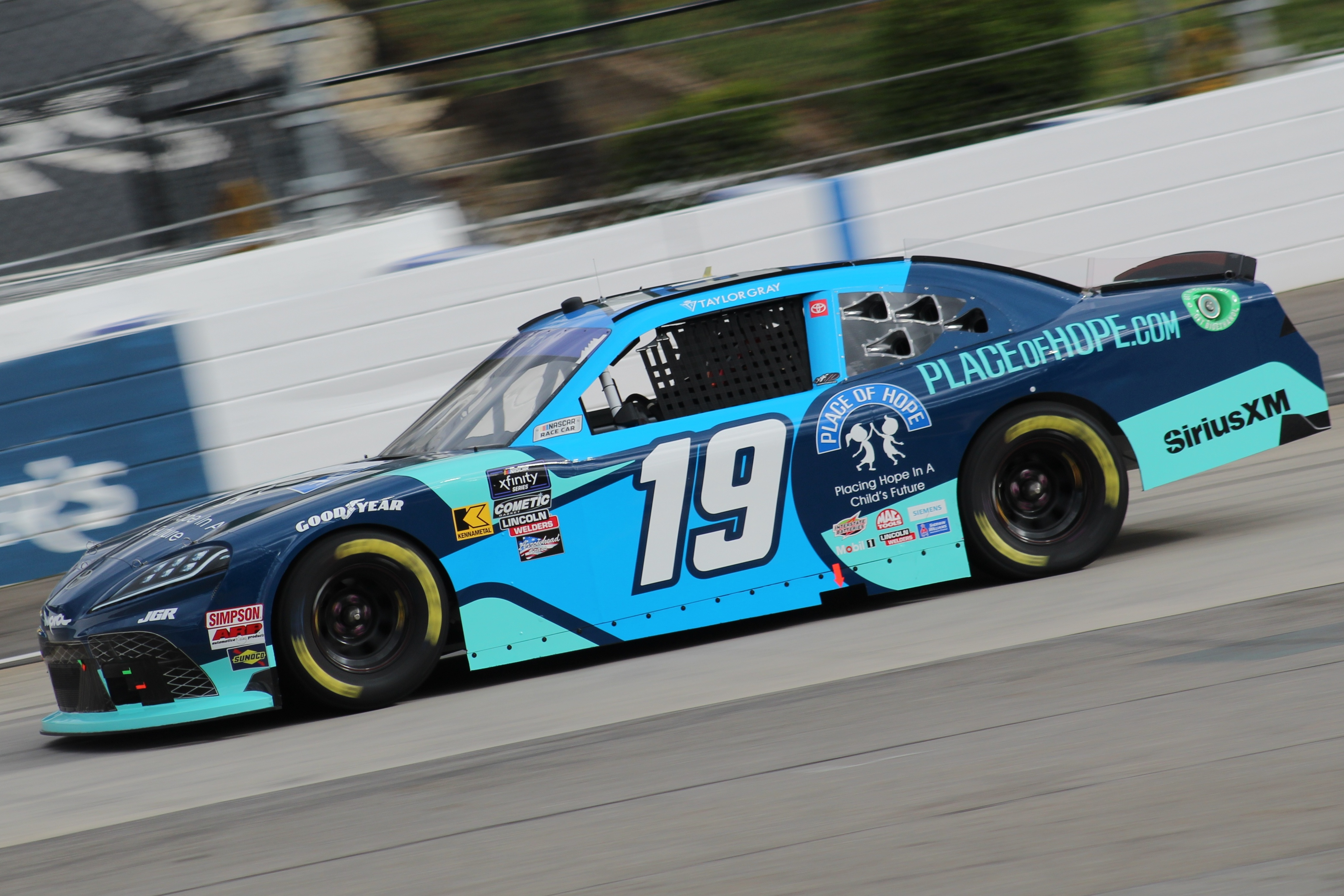
Gray's No. 19 car at Richmond Raceway in 2024.

==== 2024: Joe Gibbs Racing ====
On December 13, 2023, Joe Gibbs Racing announced their driver lineup for the 2024 NASCAR Xfinity Series season. Gray would run ten races in the Xfinity Series in 2024 for JGR, driving the No. 19 car, sharing the ride with Ryan Truex, Aric Almirola, Ty Gibbs, Joe Graf Jr., William Sawalich, and other drivers to be announced. Gray made his debut at Richmond Raceway, starting 27th and finishing an impressive third. The next two weeks he would finish thirteenth at Martinsville and eleventh at Texas, respectively.

==== 2025: Full-time, first win ====
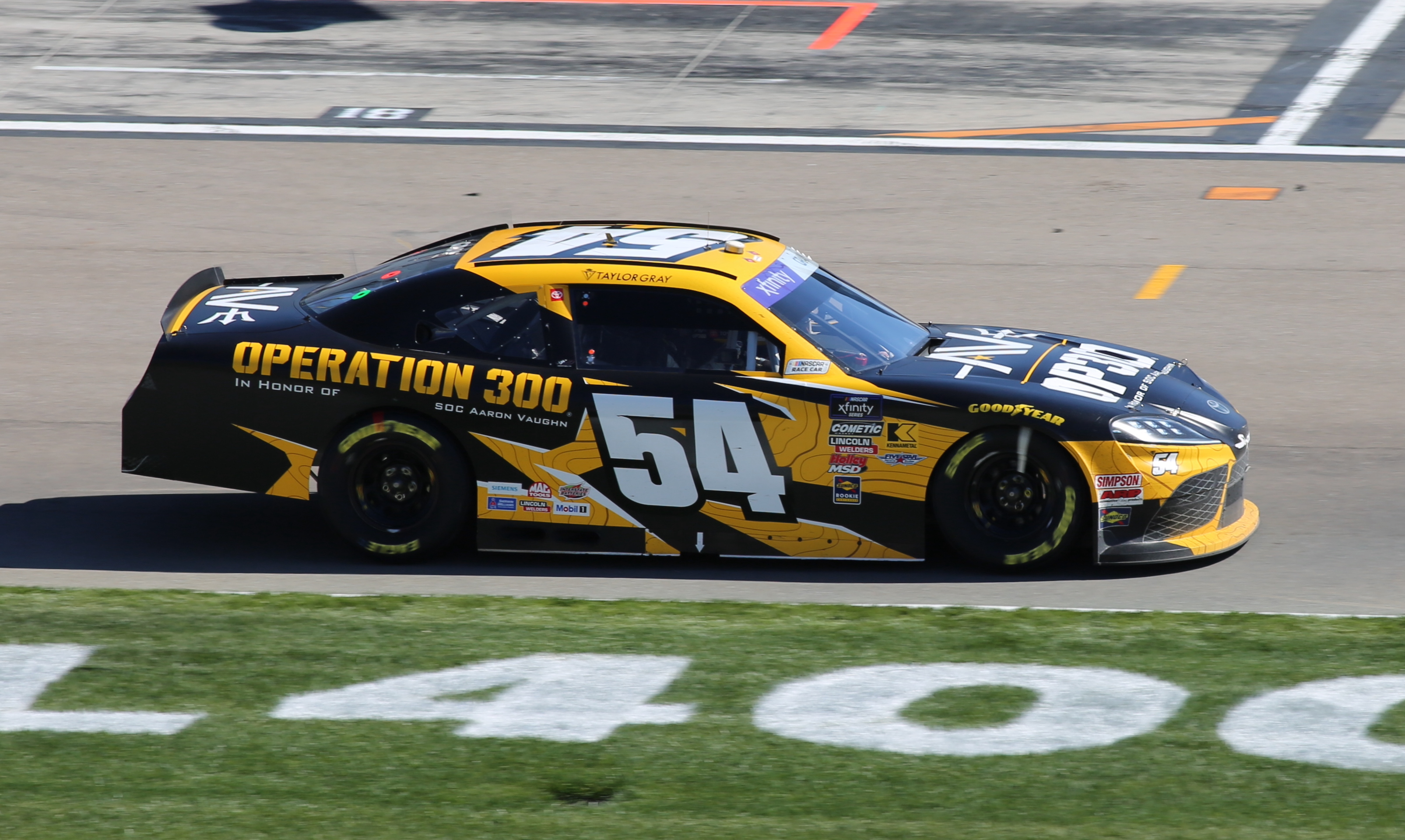
Gray's No. 54 car at Las Vegas Motor Speedway in 2025

On October 16, 2024, it was announced that Gray will run full-time for the 2025 season, driving the No. 54 Toyota for JGR. He started the season with a fifth-place finish at Daytona. At the Martinsville Spring race, Gray was leading the race after an overtime restart with one lap to go and had a shot to win. However, in the third turn, the car behind Gray in Sammy Smith went deep into the corner and got into the back of Gray hard enough that it spun Gray around. Not only did it cost Gray the win, but it also cost Smith the win as well as Austin Hill snuck by both Smith and Justin Allgaier in the final corner to take home the win. Smith finished tenth while Gray finished 29th. After the race, Gray confronted Smith outside the infield care center where the two had an intense altercation where both had to be held back by security and NASCAR officials. Gray earned multiple poles and top-tens, but he was ultimately eliminated from the playoffs following the Round of 12. He later scored his first career win during the playoffs at Martinsville.

==== 2026: Another win ====
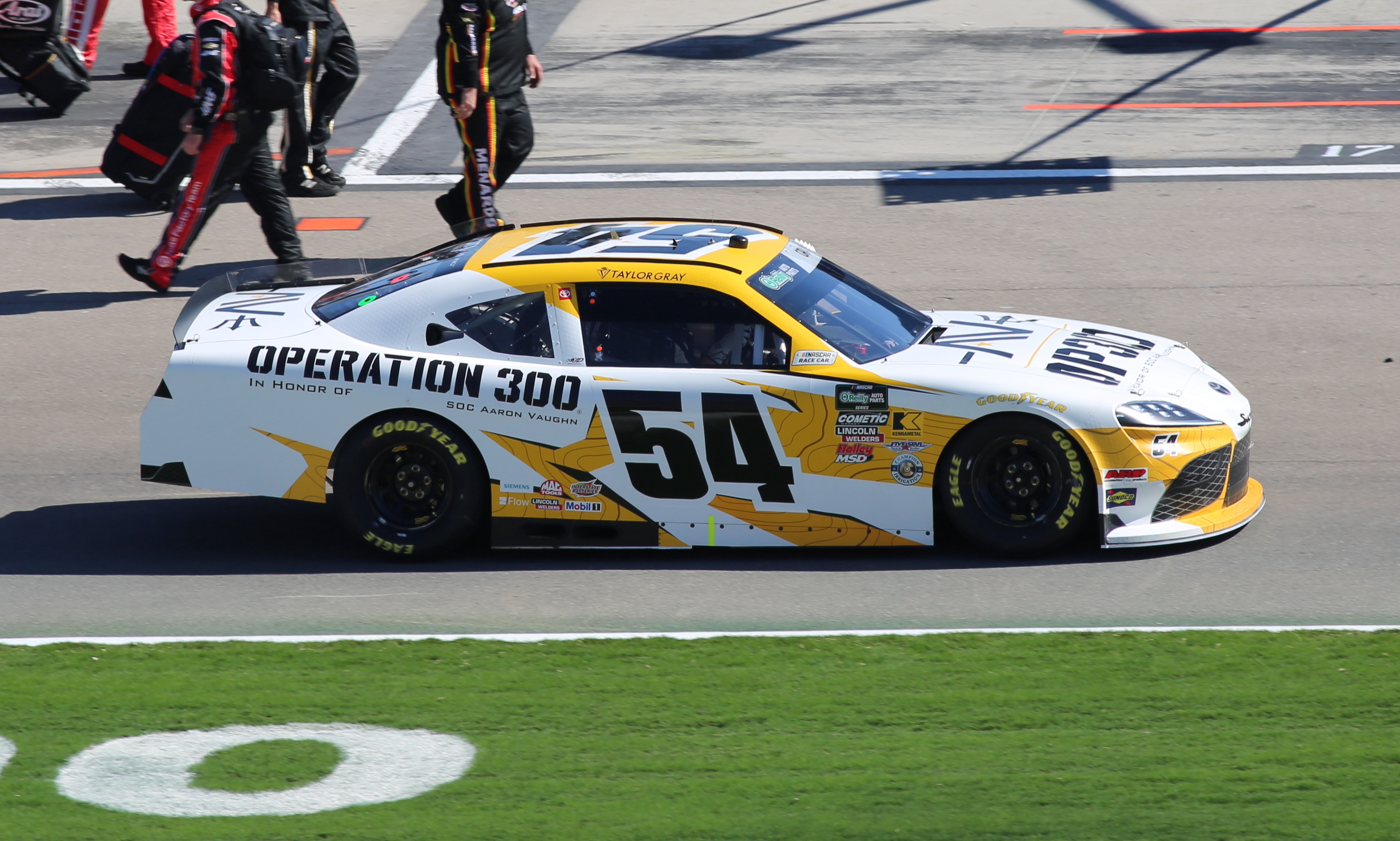
Gray's No. 54 car at Las Vegas Motor Speedway in 2026

On January 6, 2026, JGR announced that Gray will return to the team and run their No. 54 car for a second year. Gray started the 2026 season with a 28th-place DNF at Daytona. He earned a pole at Phoenix. He also scored a win at Kansas.

==== 2027 ====
On June 21, 2026, JGR announced that Gray would return to the No. 54 car for 2027.

== Personal life ==
He is the younger brother of Tanner Gray, who drives for Tricon Garage in their No. 15 Toyota Tundra in the NASCAR Craftsman Truck Series. He is also the son of Shane Gray, an NHRA driver, and grandson of Johnny Gray, a Funny Car driver and businessman. In addition to racing, Johnny Gray was the president of Marbob Energy. Since 2021, Johnny Gray has co-owned Tricon Garage. One of Taylor's hobbies is wakeboarding.

== Motorsports career results ==
=== Racing career summary ===
Season	Series	Team	Races	Wins	Top 5	Top 10	Points	Position
2019	CARS Late Model Stock Car Tour	DGR-Crosley	9	1	2	4	206	9th
2020	CARS Late Model Stock Car Tour	DGR-Crosley	2	1	1	1	52	27th
2020	ARCA Menards Series West	DGR-Crosley	5	1	3	4	161	13th
2020	ARCA Menards Series East	DGR-Crosley	5	0	2	4	237	8th
2020	ARCA Menards Series	DGR-Crosley	12	0	8	11	460	11th
2021	CARS Late Model Stock Car Tour	David Gilliland Racing	1	0	0	0	14	55th
2021	ARCA Menards Series West	David Gilliland Racing	5	2	3	4	245	12th
2021	ARCA Menards Series East	David Gilliland Racing	5	0	5	5	258	8th
2021	ARCA Menards Series	David Gilliland Racing	11	0	8	10	428	8th
2021	NASCAR Camping World Truck Series	David Gilliland Racing	5	0	0	1	76	40th
2022	ARCA Menards Series West	David Gilliland Racing	3	2	2	2	164	19th
2022	ARCA Menards Series East	David Gilliland Racing	7	1	6	7	385	**2nd**
2022	ARCA Menards Series	David Gilliland Racing	14	3	10	12	606	10th
2022	NASCAR Camping World Truck Series	David Gilliland Racing	8	0	0	1	147	34th
2023	ARCA Menards Series	Joe Gibbs Racing	1	0	0	1	120	36th
2023	ARCA Menards Series	TRICON Garage	2	0	2	2	120	36th
2023	NASCAR Craftsman Truck Series	TRICON Garage	20	0	3	6	490	15th
2024	NASCAR Craftsman Truck Series	TRICON Garage	23	0	8	14	2247	6th
2024	NASCAR Xfinity Series	Joe Gibbs Racing	13	0	2	3	0	NC†
2025	NASCAR Xfinity Series	Joe Gibbs Racing	33	1	7	15	2228	7th
2026	NASCAR Craftsman Truck Series	TRICON Garage					0	NC†
2026	NASCAR O'Reilly Auto Parts Series	Joe Gibbs Racing					TBD	TBD

=== NASCAR ===
(key) (Bold – Pole position awarded by qualifying time. Italics – Pole position earned by points standings or practice time. * – Most laps led.)

==== O'Reilly Auto Parts Series ====
NASCAR O'Reilly Auto Parts Series results
Year	Team	No.	Make	1	2	3	4	5	6	7	8	9	10	11	12	13	14	15	16	17	18	19	20	21	22	23	24	25	26	27	28	29	30	31	32	33	NOAPSC	Pts	Ref
2024	Joe Gibbs Racing	19	Toyota	DAY	ATL	LVS	PHO	COA	RCH; 3	MAR; 13	TEX; 11	TAL; 15	DOV; 34	DAR; 18	CLT; 12	PIR	SON	IOW	NHA	NSH	CSC	POC; 5	IND	MCH; 8	DAY	DAR	ATL; 28	GLN	BRI	KAN; 38	TAL; 32	ROV	LVS; 33	HOM	MAR	PHO	83rd	0^{1}	
2025	Joe Gibbs Racing	54	Toyota	DAY; 5	ATL; 38	COA; 7	PHO; 6	LVS; 19	**HOM**; 23	MAR; 29	DAR; 33	BRI; 19	CAR; 5	TAL; 11	TEX; 2	**CLT**; 30	NSH; 25	MXC; 2	POC; 9	ATL; 5	CSC; 34	SON; 7	**DOV**; 7	IND; 3	IOW; 17	GLN; 18	DAY; 30	PIR; 14	GTW; 17	BRI; 14	KAN; 6	ROV; 13	LVS; 8	TAL; 31	MAR; 1*	PHO; 7	7th	2228	
2026	Joe Gibbs Racing	54	Toyota	DAY; 28	ATL; 9	COA; 12	**PHO**; 15	LVS; 37	DAR; 15	MAR; 13	CAR; 7	BRI; 10	KAN; 1	TAL; 29	TEX; 33	GLN; 3	DOV; 32	CLT; 31	NSH; 9	POC; 17	COR; 2*	SON; 29	CHI; 7	ATL; 33	IND; 12	IOW; 7	DAY; 26	DAR; 7	GTW; 4	BRI; 6	LVS; 5	CLT; 9	PHO; 28	TAL; 21	MAR; 10	HOM; 14	9th	2300	

==== Craftsman Truck Series ====
NASCAR Craftsman Truck Series results
Year	Team	No.	Make	1	2	3	4	5	6	7	8	9	10	11	12	13	14	15	16	17	18	19	20	21	22	23	24	25	NCTC	Pts	Ref
2021	David Gilliland Racing	17	Ford	DAY	DRC	LVS	ATL	BRD	RCH	KAN	DAR	COA	CLT	TEX	NSH	POC	KNX	GLN; 35	GTW; 12	DAR	BRI; 29	LVS	TAL	MAR; 8	PHO; 29				40th	76	
2022	David Gilliland Racing	17	Ford	DAY	LVS	ATL	COA; 26	MAR; 26	BRD	DAR	KAN	TEX	CLT	GTW; 36	SON	KNX	NSH	MOH; 15	POC	IRP; 22	RCH; 6	KAN	BRI; 16	TAL	HOM	PHO; 17			34th	147	
2023	Tricon Garage	17	Toyota	DAY	LVS	ATL	COA; 11	TEX; 24	BRD; 34	MAR; 8	KAN; 9	DAR; 21	NWS; 21	CLT; 10	GTW; 13	NSH; 14	MOH; 15	POC; 3	RCH; 14	IRP; 20	MLW; 13	KAN; 2	BRI; 5	TAL; 18	HOM; 13	PHO; 23			15th	490	
2024	Tricon Garage	17	Toyota	DAY; 19	ATL; 4	LVS; 4	BRI; 7	COA; 2	MAR; 6	TEX; 7	KAN; 27	DAR; 8	NWS; 13	CLT; 12	GTW; 30	NSH; 34	POC; 4	IRP; 16	RCH; 3	MLW; 5	BRI; 12	KAN; 18	TAL; 2	HOM; 10	MAR; 4	PHO; 6			6th	2247	
2026	Tricon Garage	1	Toyota	DAY; 28	ATL	STP	DAR	ROC	BRI	TEX	GLN	DOV	CLT	NSH	MCH	COR	LRP	NWS	IRP	RCH	NHA	BRI	KAN	CLT	PHO	TAL	MAR	HOM	117th	0^{1}	

^{*} Season still in progress
^{1} Ineligible for series points

=== ARCA Menards Series ===
(key) (Bold – Pole position awarded by qualifying time. Italics – Pole position earned by points standings or practice time. * – Most laps led.)

ARCA Menards Series results
Year	Team	No.	Make	1	2	3	4	5	6	7	8	9	10	11	12	13	14	15	16	17	18	19	20	AMSC	Pts	Ref
2020	DGR-Crosley	17	Ford	DAY	PHO	TAL	POC	IRP; 4	KEN	IOW; 5	KAN	TOL; 3	TOL; 11	MCH	DRC; 4	GTW; 8	L44; 3	TOL; 5	BRI; 7	WIN; 5	MEM; 9	ISF; 4	KAN	11th	460	
2021	David Gilliland Racing	17	Ford	DAY	PHO; 9	TAL	KAN	TOL	CLT	MOH	POC	ELK; 5	BLN; 4	IOW; 3	WIN; 5	GLN; 7	MCH		MLW; 4		BRI; 3	SLM; 11	KAN	8th	428	
2021	David Gilliland Racing	46	Ford															ISF; 3		DSF; 5				8th	428	
2022	David Gilliland Racing	17	Ford	DAY	PHO; 1	TAL	KAN	CLT	IOW; 18	BLN; 4	ELK; 4	MOH; 1	POC; 1*	IRP; 3	MCH	GLN; 8	ISF; 8	MLW; 2	DSF; 12	KAN	BRI; 3	SLM; 5	TOL; 4	10th	606	
2023	Joe Gibbs Racing	18	Toyota	DAY	PHO	TAL; 7																		36th	120	
2023	Tricon Garage	17	Toyota				KAN; 3	CLT; 3	BLN	ELK	MOH	IOW	POC	MCH	IRP	GLN	ISF	MLW	DSF	KAN	BRI	SLM	TOL	36th	120	

==== ARCA Menards Series East ====
ARCA Menards Series East results
Year	Team	No.	Make	1	2	3	4	5	6	7	8	AMSEC	Pts	Ref
2020	DGR-Crosley	17	Ford	NSM	TOL; 8	DOV; 9	TOL; 5	BRI; 7	FIF; 4			8th	237	
2021	David Gilliland Racing	17	Ford	**NSM**; 3	FIF; 3	NSV	DOV	SNM	IOW; 3	MLW; 4	BRI; 3	8th	258	
2022	David Gilliland Racing	17	Ford	NSM; 2	FIF; 3	**DOV**; 1*	NSV; 3	IOW; 18	MLW; 2	BRI; 3		2nd	385	

==== ARCA Menards Series West ====
ARCA Menards Series West results
Year	Team	No.	Make	1	2	3	4	5	6	7	8	9	10	11	AMSWC	Pts	Ref
2020	DGR-Crosley	17	Ford	LVS	MMP; 4	MMP; 11	IRW	EVG	DCS	CNS	LVS	**AAS**; 7*	KCR; 1*	PHO; 3	13th	161	
2021	David Gilliland Racing	17	Ford	PHO; 9	SON	IRW	CNS	IRW	PIR; 1						12th	245	
2021	David Gilliland Racing	17E	Ford							LVS; 1*	AAS; 22				12th	245	
2021	David Gilliland Racing	71	Ford									PHO; 2			12th	245	
2022	David Gilliland Racing	17	Ford	PHO; 1	IRW	KCR	PIR	SON	IRW	EVG	PIR	AAS			19th	164	
2022	David Gilliland Racing	71	Ford										**LVS**; 1*	PHO; 27	19th	164	

=== CARS Late Model Stock Car Tour ===
(key) (Bold – Pole position awarded by qualifying time. Italics – Pole position earned by points standings or practice time. * – Most laps led. ** – All laps led.)

CARS Late Model Stock Car Tour results
Year	Team	No.	Make	1	2	3	4	5	6	7	8	9	10	11	12	13	CLMSCTC	Pts	Ref
2019	DGR-Crosley	17	Toyota	SNM; 13	HCY; 1*	**ROU**; 2*	ACE; 19	MMS; 12	LGY; 19	DOM	CCS	HCY; 18	ROU; 6	SBO; 7			9th	206	
2020	DGR-Crosley	17	Ford	SNM; 1*	ACE; 16	HCY	HCY	DOM	FCS	LGY	CCS	FLO	GRE				27th	52	
2021	David Gilliland Racing	54	Ford	DIL	HCY	OCS	ACE	CRW	LGY	DOM	HCY	MMS	TCM	FLC	WKS	SBO; 19	55th	14	
