= 2025 United Rentals 250 =

31st race of the 2025 NASCAR Xfinity Series

Race details
- Race 31 of 33 of the 2025 NASCAR Xfinity Series
- Date: October 18, 2025
- Official name: 5th Annual United Rentals 250
- Location: Talladega Superspeedway in Lincoln, Alabama
- Course: Permanent racing facility
- Course length: 2.66 miles (4.28 km)
- Distance: 100 laps, 266 mi (428.08 km)
- Scheduled distance: 94 laps, 250.04 mi (402.40 km)
- Average speed: 131.322 mph (211.342 km/h)

Pole position
Driver	Jesse Love	Richard Childress Racing
- Time: 52.605

Most laps led
Driver	Austin Hill	Richard Childress Racing
- Laps: 48

Winner
No. 21	Austin Hill	Richard Childress Racing

Television in the United States
- Network: CW
- Announcers: Adam Alexander, Parker Kligerman, and Jamie McMurray
- Nielsen ratings: 980,000

Radio in the United States
- Radio: MRN

The 2025 United Rentals 250 was the 31st stock car race of the 2025 NASCAR Xfinity Series, the second race of the Round of 8, and the 5th iteration of the event. The race was held on Saturday, October 18, 2025, at Talladega Superspeedway in Lincoln, Alabama, a 2.66 miles (4.28 km) asphalt superspeedway. The race was contested over 100 laps, extended from 94 laps due to a green–white–checkered finish.

In a wreck-filled race, Austin Hill, driving for Richard Childress Racing, would survive late chaos and continued to dominate superspeedways by winning both stages and leading a race-high 48 laps to earn his 14th career NASCAR Xfinity Series win, and his fourth of the season, sweeping both Talladega races for this season. He also advanced the No. 21 car into the Championship 4 of the owner's playoffs. To fill out the podium, Carson Kvapil and Justin Allgaier, both driving for JR Motorsports, would finish 2nd and 3rd, respectively.

== Report ==
=== Background ===
Talladega Superspeedway, the track where the race was held.

Talladega Superspeedway, formerly known as Alabama International Motor Speedway, is a motorsports complex located north of Talladega, Alabama. It is located on the former Anniston Air Force Base in the small city of Lincoln. A tri-oval, the track was constructed in 1969 by the International Speedway Corporation, a business controlled by the France family. Talladega is most known for its steep banking. The track currently hosts NASCAR's Cup Series, Xfinity Series, and Craftsman Truck Series. Talladega is the longest NASCAR oval with a length of 2.66-mile-long (4.28 km) tri-oval like the Daytona International Speedway, which is 2.5-mile-long (4.0 km).

=== Entry list ===
- (R) denotes rookie driver.
- (i) denotes driver who is ineligible for series driver points.
- (P) denotes playoff driver.
- (OP) denotes owner's playoff car.

#	Driver	Team	Make
00	Sheldon Creed (P)	Haas Factory Team	Ford
1	Carson Kvapil (P) (R)	JR Motorsports	Chevrolet
2	Jesse Love (P)	Richard Childress Racing	Chevrolet
4	Parker Retzlaff	Alpha Prime Racing	Chevrolet
5	Caesar Bacarella	Alpha Prime Racing	Chevrolet
07	Nick Leitz	SS-Green Light Racing	Chevrolet
7	Justin Allgaier (P)	JR Motorsports	Chevrolet
8	Sammy Smith (P)	JR Motorsports	Chevrolet
10	Daniel Dye (R)	Kaulig Racing	Chevrolet
11	Brenden Queen	Kaulig Racing	Chevrolet
14	Garrett Smithley	SS-Green Light Racing	Chevrolet
16	Christian Eckes (R)	Kaulig Racing	Chevrolet
18	William Sawalich (R)	Joe Gibbs Racing	Toyota
19	Aric Almirola (OP)	Joe Gibbs Racing	Toyota
20	Brandon Jones (P)	Joe Gibbs Racing	Toyota
21	Austin Hill (OP)	Richard Childress Racing	Chevrolet
25	Harrison Burton	AM Racing	Ford
26	Dean Thompson (R)	Sam Hunt Racing	Toyota
27	Jeb Burton	Jordan Anderson Racing	Chevrolet
28	Kyle Sieg	RSS Racing	Ford
31	Blaine Perkins	Jordan Anderson Racing	Chevrolet
32	Jordan Anderson	Jordan Anderson Racing	Chevrolet
35	David Starr	Joey Gase Motorsports	Chevrolet
39	Ryan Sieg	RSS Racing	Ford
41	Sam Mayer (P)	Haas Factory Team	Ford
42	Anthony Alfredo	Young's Motorsports	Chevrolet
44	Brennan Poole	Alpha Prime Racing	Chevrolet
45	Josh Williams	Alpha Prime Racing	Chevrolet
48	Nick Sanchez (R)	Big Machine Racing	Chevrolet
51	Jeremy Clements	Jeremy Clements Racing	Chevrolet
53	Joey Gase	Joey Gase Motorsports	Chevrolet
54	Taylor Gray (R)	Joe Gibbs Racing	Toyota
70	Leland Honeyman	Cope Family Racing	Chevrolet
71	Ryan Ellis	DGM Racing	Chevrolet
74	Carson Ware	Mike Harmon Racing	Chevrolet
88	Connor Zilisch (P) (R)	JR Motorsports	Chevrolet
91	Mason Maggio	DGM Racing	Chevrolet
99	Connor Mosack (i)	Viking Motorsports	Chevrolet
Official entry list

== Qualifying ==
Qualifying was held on Saturday, October 18, at 10:30 AM CST. Since Talladega Superspeedway is a superspeedway, the qualifying procedure used is a single-car, one-lap system with two rounds. In the first round, drivers have one lap to set a time and determine positions 11-38. The fastest ten drivers from the first round will advance to the second and final round, and whoever sets the fastest time in Round 2 will win the pole and determine the rest of the starting lineup.

Jesse Love, driving for Richard Childress Racing, would win the pole after advancing from the preliminary round and setting the fastest time in Round 2, with a lap of 52.605, and a speed of 182.036 mph (292.959 km/h).

No drivers would fail to qualify.

=== Qualifying results ===
Pos.	#	Driver	Team	Make	Time (R1)	Speed (R1)	Time (R2)	Speed (R2)
1	2	Jesse Love (P)	Richard Childress Racing	Chevrolet	52.790	181.398	52.605	182.036
2	18	William Sawalich (R)	Joe Gibbs Racing	Toyota	52.950	180.850	52.702	181.701
3	16	Christian Eckes (R)	Kaulig Racing	Chevrolet	52.964	180.802	52.709	181.677
4	1	Carson Kvapil (P) (R)	JR Motorsports	Chevrolet	52.987	180.724	52.765	181.484
5	21	Austin Hill (OP)	Richard Childress Racing	Chevrolet	52.988	180.720	52.786	181.412
6	27	Jeb Burton	Jordan Anderson Racing	Chevrolet	52.972	180.775	52.799	181.367
7	88	Connor Zilisch (P) (R)	JR Motorsports	Chevrolet	53.016	180.625	52.814	181.316
8	7	Justin Allgaier (P)	JR Motorsports	Chevrolet	53.125	180.254	52.838	181.233
9	19	Aric Almirola (OP)	Joe Gibbs Racing	Toyota	53.027	180.587	52.839	181.230
10	20	Brandon Jones (P)	Joe Gibbs Racing	Toyota	52.969	180.785	52.866	181.137
Eliminated in Round 1
11	8	Sammy Smith (P)	JR Motorsports	Chevrolet	53.171	180.098	—	—
12	11	Brenden Queen	Kaulig Racing	Chevrolet	53.189	180.037	—	—
13	41	Sam Mayer (P)	Haas Factory Team	Ford	53.197	180.010	—	—
14	31	Blaine Perkins	Jordan Anderson Racing	Chevrolet	53.236	179.878	—	—
15	10	Daniel Dye (R)	Kaulig Racing	Chevrolet	53.253	179.821	—	—
16	00	Sheldon Creed (P)	Haas Factory Team	Ford	53.343	179.517	—	—
17	26	Dean Thompson (R)	Sam Hunt Racing	Toyota	53.345	179.511	—	—
18	99	Connor Mosack (i)	Viking Motorsports	Chevrolet	53.350	179.494	—	—
19	91	Mason Maggio	DGM Racing	Chevrolet	53.350	179.494	—	—
20	48	Nick Sanchez (R)	Big Machine Racing	Chevrolet	53.354	179.480	—	—
21	51	Jeremy Clements	Jeremy Clements Racing	Chevrolet	53.418	179.265	—	—
22	71	Ryan Ellis	DGM Racing	Chevrolet	53.440	179.192	—	—
23	39	Ryan Sieg	RSS Racing	Ford	53.462	179.118	—	—
24	4	Parker Retzlaff	Alpha Prime Racing	Chevrolet	53.483	179.048	—	—
25	5	Caesar Bacarella	Alpha Prime Racing	Chevrolet	53.483	179.048	—	—
26	32	Jordan Anderson	Jordan Anderson Racing	Chevrolet	53.491	179.021	—	—
27	42	Anthony Alfredo	Young's Motorsports	Chevrolet	53.506	178.971	—	—
28	07	Nick Leitz	SS-Green Light Racing	Chevrolet	53.507	178.967	—	—
29	70	Leland Honeyman	Cope Family Racing	Chevrolet	53.515	178.940	—	—
30	25	Harrison Burton	AM Racing	Ford	53.518	178.930	—	—
31	45	Josh Williams	Alpha Prime Racing	Chevrolet	53.583	178.713	—	—
32	35	David Starr	Joey Gase Motorsports	Chevrolet	53.587	178.700	—	—
Qualified by owner's points
33	14	Garrett Smithley	SS-Green Light Racing	Chevrolet	53.645	178.507	—	—
34	44	Brennan Poole	Alpha Prime Racing	Chevrolet	53.819	177.930	—	—
35	28	Kyle Sieg	RSS Racing	Ford	54.151	176.839	—	—
36	53	Joey Gase	Joey Gase Motorsports	Chevrolet	54.177	176.754	—	—
37	74	Carson Ware	Mike Harmon Racing	Chevrolet	55.387	172.893	—	—
38	54	Taylor Gray (R)	Joe Gibbs Racing	Toyota	—	—	—	—
Official qualifying results
Official starting lineup

== Race results ==
Stage 1 Laps: 25

Pos.	#	Driver	Team	Make	Pts
1	21	Austin Hill (OP)	Richard Childress Racing	Chevrolet	10
2	7	Justin Allgaier (P)	JR Motorsports	Chevrolet	9
3	2	Jesse Love (P)	Richard Childress Racing	Chevrolet	8
4	88	Connor Zilisch (P) (R)	JR Motorsports	Chevrolet	7
5	19	Aric Almirola (OP)	Joe Gibbs Racing	Toyota	6
6	8	Sammy Smith (P)	JR Motorsports	Chevrolet	5
7	31	Blaine Perkins	Jordan Anderson Racing	Chevrolet	4
8	26	Dean Thompson (R)	Sam Hunt Racing	Toyota	3
9	1	Carson Kvapil (P) (R)	JR Motorsports	Chevrolet	2
10	18	William Sawalich (R)	Joe Gibbs Racing	Toyota	1

Stage 2 Laps: 25

Pos.	#	Driver	Team	Make	Pts
1	21	Austin Hill (OP)	Richard Childress Racing	Chevrolet	10
2	7	Justin Allgaier (P)	JR Motorsports	Chevrolet	9
3	1	Carson Kvapil (P) (R)	JR Motorsports	Chevrolet	8
4	16	Christian Eckes (R)	Kaulig Racing	Chevrolet	7
5	48	Nick Sanchez (R)	Big Machine Racing	Chevrolet	6
6	2	Jesse Love (P)	Richard Childress Racing	Chevrolet	5
7	19	Aric Almirola (OP)	Joe Gibbs Racing	Toyota	4
8	8	Sammy Smith (P)	JR Motorsports	Chevrolet	3
9	10	Daniel Dye (R)	Kaulig Racing	Chevrolet	2
10	27	Jeb Burton	Jordan Anderson Racing	Chevrolet	1

Stage 3 Laps: 50

Fin	St	#	Driver	Team	Make	Laps	Led	Status	Pts
1	5	21	Austin Hill (OP)	Richard Childress Racing	Chevrolet	100	48	Running	60
2	4	1	Carson Kvapil (P) (R)	JR Motorsports	Chevrolet	100	0	Running	45
3	8	7	Justin Allgaier (P)	JR Motorsports	Chevrolet	100	11	Running	52
4	3	16	Christian Eckes (R)	Kaulig Racing	Chevrolet	100	0	Running	40
5	25	5	Caesar Bacarella	Alpha Prime Racing	Chevrolet	100	0	Running	32
6	14	31	Blaine Perkins	Jordan Anderson Racing	Chevrolet	100	0	Running	35
7	24	4	Parker Retzlaff	Alpha Prime Racing	Chevrolet	100	0	Running	30
8	29	70	Leland Honeyman	Cope Family Racing	Chevrolet	100	0	Running	29
9	11	8	Sammy Smith (P)	JR Motorsports	Chevrolet	100	0	Running	36
10	1	2	Jesse Love (P)	Richard Childress Racing	Chevrolet	100	19	Running	40
11	28	07	Nick Leitz	SS-Green Light Racing	Chevrolet	100	0	Running	26
12	33	14	Garrett Smithley	SS-Green Light Racing	Chevrolet	100	0	Running	25
13	30	25	Harrison Burton	AM Racing	Ford	100	1	Running	24
14	31	45	Josh Williams	Alpha Prime Racing	Chevrolet	100	0	Running	24
15	35	28	Kyle Sieg	RSS Racing	Ford	100	0	Running	22
16	36	53	Joey Gase	Joey Gase Motorsports	Chevrolet	100	0	Running	21
17	6	27	Jeb Burton	Jordan Anderson Racing	Chevrolet	100	0	Running	21
18	32	35	David Starr	Joey Gase Motorsports	Chevrolet	100	0	Running	19
19	34	44	Brennan Poole	Alpha Prime Racing	Chevrolet	100	0	Running	18
20	20	48	Nick Sanchez (R)	Big Machine Racing	Chevrolet	100	6	Running	23
21	37	74	Carson Ware	Mike Harmon Racing	Chevrolet	100	0	Running	16
22	19	91	Mason Maggio	DGM Racing	Chevrolet	99	0	Running	15
23	7	88	Connor Zilisch (P) (R)	JR Motorsports	Chevrolet	97	1	Running	21
24	9	19	Aric Almirola (OP)	Joe Gibbs Racing	Toyota	92	4	Accident	23
25	15	10	Daniel Dye (R)	Kaulig Racing	Chevrolet	92	4	Accident	14
26	10	20	Brandon Jones (P)	Joe Gibbs Racing	Toyota	84	0	Running	11
27	22	71	Ryan Ellis	DGM Racing	Chevrolet	49	0	Radiator	10
28	18	99	Connor Mosack (i)	Viking Motorsports	Chevrolet	44	0	Accident	0
29	17	26	Dean Thompson (R)	Sam Hunt Racing	Toyota	44	4	Accident	11
30	2	18	William Sawalich (R)	Joe Gibbs Racing	Toyota	44	2	Accident	8
31	38	54	Taylor Gray (R)	Joe Gibbs Racing	Toyota	41	0	Rear Gear	6
32	26	32	Jordan Anderson	Jordan Anderson Racing	Chevrolet	19	0	Accident	5
33	27	42	Anthony Alfredo	Young's Motorsports	Chevrolet	17	0	Accident	4
34	16	00	Sheldon Creed (P)	Haas Factory Team	Ford	15	0	Accident	3
35	23	39	Ryan Sieg	RSS Racing	Ford	15	0	Accident	2
36	12	11	Brenden Queen	Kaulig Racing	Chevrolet	15	0	Accident	1
37	21	51	Jeremy Clements	Jeremy Clements Racing	Chevrolet	15	0	Accident	1
38	13	41	Sam Mayer (P)	Haas Factory Team	Ford	15	0	DVP	1
Official race results

== Standings after the race ==
Drivers' Championship standings

	Pos	Driver	Points
	1	Connor Zilisch	3,145
	2	Justin Allgaier	3,138 (–7)
	3	Jesse Love	3,102 (–43)
3	4	Carson Kvapil	3,073 (–72)
3	5	Sammy Smith	3,062 (–83)
1	6	Brandon Jones	3,053 (–92)
3	7	Sam Mayer	3,051 (–94)
2	8	Sheldon Creed	3,032 (–113)
2	9	Austin Hill	2,177 (–968)
	10	Nick Sanchez	2,148 (–997)
2	11	Taylor Gray	2,137 (–1,008)
	12	Harrison Burton	2,107 (–1,038)
Official driver's standings

Manufacturers' Championship standings

Pos	Manufacturer	Points
1	Chevrolet	1,203
2	Toyota	1,007 (–196)
3	Ford	960 (–243)

- Note: Only the first 12 positions are included for the driver standings.

Previous race: 2025 Focused Health 302	NASCAR Xfinity Series; 2025 season	Next race: 2025 IAA and Ritchie Bros. 250
