= Brent Crews Motorsports =

American stock car racing team

- Owner: Brent Crews
- Series: NASCAR Craftsman Truck Series
- Race drivers: Truck Series; 70. Brent Crews (part-time)
- Manufacturer: Toyota
- Opened: 2025

Career
- Debut: Truck Series: 2025 Mission 176 at The Glen (Watkins Glen)
- Races competed: Total: 1 Truck Series: 1
- Drivers' Championships: Total: 0 Truck Series: 0
- Race victories: Total: 0 Truck Series: 0
- Pole positions: Total: 0 Truck Series: 0

Brent Crews Motorsports (BCM) is an American stock car racing team that competes in the NASCAR Craftsman Truck Series. The team was founded in 2025 by Brent Crews, and they field the No. 70 Toyota part-time for Crews.

== History ==
On August 1, 2025, Brent Crews announced the formation of Brent Crews Motorsports, a new team that would compete part-time in the Truck Series in 2025. Pristine Auctions were announced as the team's primary sponsors. Crews would later announce that his friends and fellow NASCAR drivers Jesse Love and Connor Zilisch would be executives of the Toyota-based team. Following pushback from Chevrolet, of which Love and Zilisch race under in the NASCAR O'Reilly Auto Parts Series, both Love and Zilisch would post similar statements denying involvement with the newly-founded team. Crews would also later post on Twitter saying that it was a joke, and they're just friends who want to see him succeed. The team would end up finishing seventeenth in the race.

== Craftsman Truck Series ==
=== Truck No. 70 history ===
==== 2025 ====
The team ran No. 70 truck for Brent Crews part-time in 2025, running one race at Watkins Glen. The entry was fielded in a collaboration with Nitro Motorsports through their team owner Nick Tucker. They would score a 17th place finish after being involved in a wreck with Tanner Gray with 8 laps to go while running 8th.

==== Truck No. 70 results ====
Year	Driver	No.	Make	1	2	3	4	5	6	7	8	9	10	11	12	13	14	15	16	17	18	19	20	21	22	23	24	25	Owners	Pts
2025	Brent Crews	70	Toyota	DAY	ATL	LVS	HOM	MAR	BRI	CAR	TEX	KAN	NWS	CLT	NSH	MCH	POC	LRP	IRP	GLN; 17	RCH	DAR	BRI	NHA	ROV	TAL	MAR	PHO	46th	20
