= Jack Wood (racing driver) =

American racing driver (born 2000)

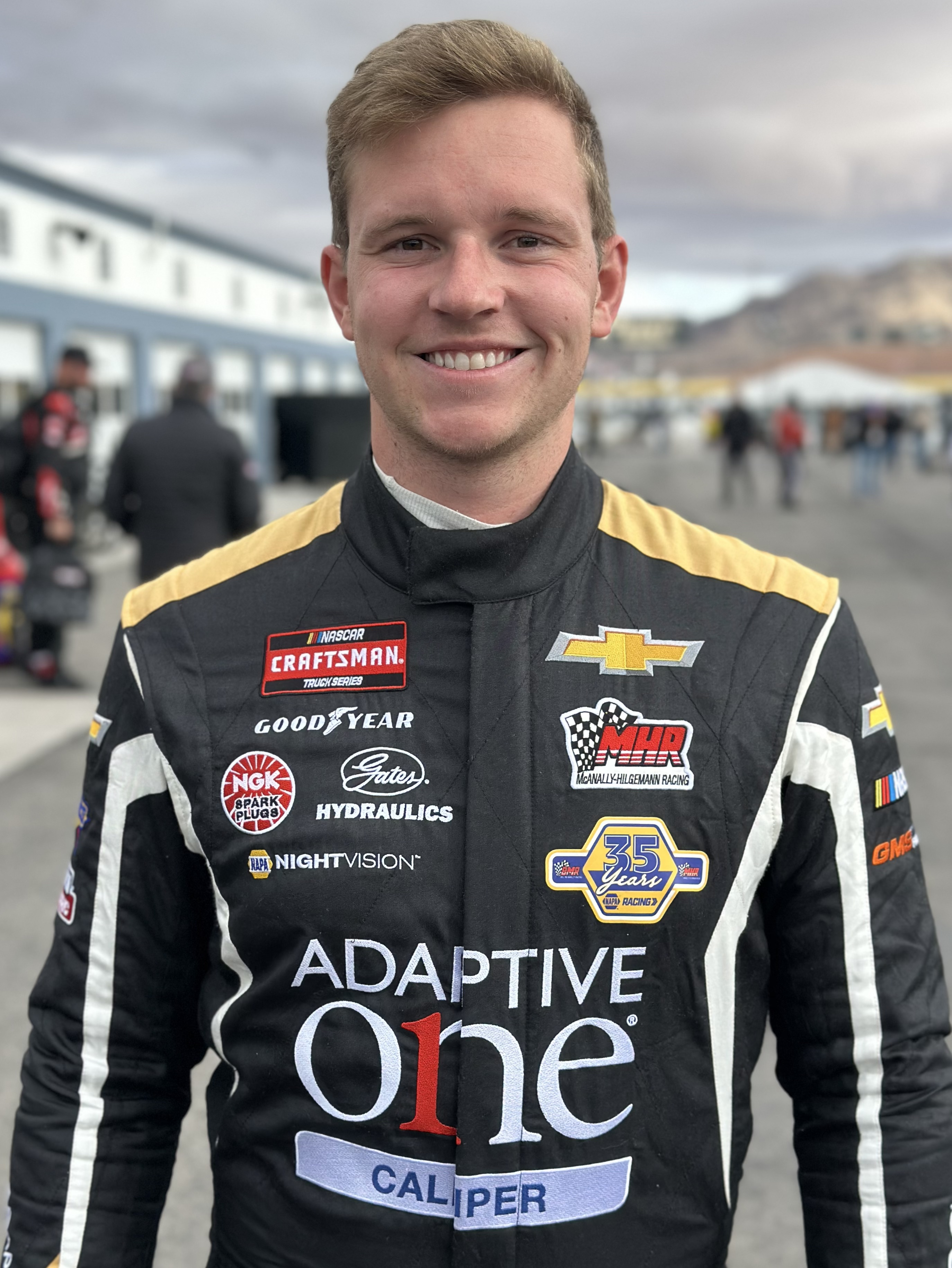
- Wood at Las Vegas Motor Speedway in 2025
- Born: Jackson Ryan Wood; August 7, 2000 (age 26); Loomis, California, U.S.

NASCAR FedEx Freight Truck Series career
- 85 races run over 5 years
- 2025 position: 19th
- Best finish: 19th (2025)
- First race: 2021 Toyota Tundra 225 (COTA)
- Last race: 2025 NASCAR Craftsman Truck Series Championship Race (Phoenix)
Wins	Top tens	Poles
0	5	0

ARCA Menards Series career
- 21 races run over 5 years
- Best finish: 13th (2023)
- First race: 2021 Lucas Oil 200 (Daytona)
- Last race: 2026 Alabama Manufactured Housing 200 (Talladega)
Wins	Top tens	Poles
0	13	0

ARCA Menards Series East career
- 3 races run over 2 years
- Best finish: 26th (2021)
- First race: 2021 Jeep Beach 175 (New Smyrna)
- Last race: 2023 Bush's Beans 200 (Bristol)
Wins	Top tens	Poles
0	1	0

ARCA Menards Series West career
- 32 races run over 7 years
- Best finish: 4th (2024)
- First race: 2019 ENEOS NAPA Auto 150 (Irwindale)
- Last race: 2025 General Tire 200 (Sonoma)
Wins	Top tens	Poles
0	18	0
- Statistics up to date as of April 25, 2026.

Jackson Ryan Wood (born August 7, 2000) is an American professional stock car racing driver. He last competed part-time in the ARCA Menards Series, driving the No. 28 Chevrolet SS for Pinnacle Racing Group. He has also previously competed in the NASCAR Craftsman Truck Series, the ARCA Menards Series East, and the ARCA Menards Series West.

== Racing career ==
=== ARCA ===
Wood competed part-time in the NASCAR K&N Pro Series East in 2019 and again in 2020 when the series became the ARCA Menards Series West after NASCAR's merger with ARCA. Driving for his family-owned team, Velocity Racing, Wood collectively scored eight top-tens and one top-five in those two years in his No. 78 car.

On November 2, 2020, it was announced that Wood would join GMS Racing in 2021 to compete full-time in the ARCA Menards Series East as well as all the Sioux Chief Showdown races in the main ARCA Menards Series, replacing 2019 and 2020 East Series champion Sam Mayer in the team's No. 21 car. This would also mean that he would become a member of the team's driver development program, Drivers Edge Development. However, these plans quietly changed, as Wood and his GMS No. 21 were entered for the first two races on the main ARCA Menards Series schedule (which they were not originally scheduled to enter), and they skipped the second race of the East Series schedule, which indicated that they would instead run full-time in the main ARCA Menards Series rather than the East Series. Wood and his No. 21 car ended up skipping the main ARCA Menards Series race at Toledo (he was at COTA on the same day for the Truck Series race), which meant that they no longer were attempting the full season.

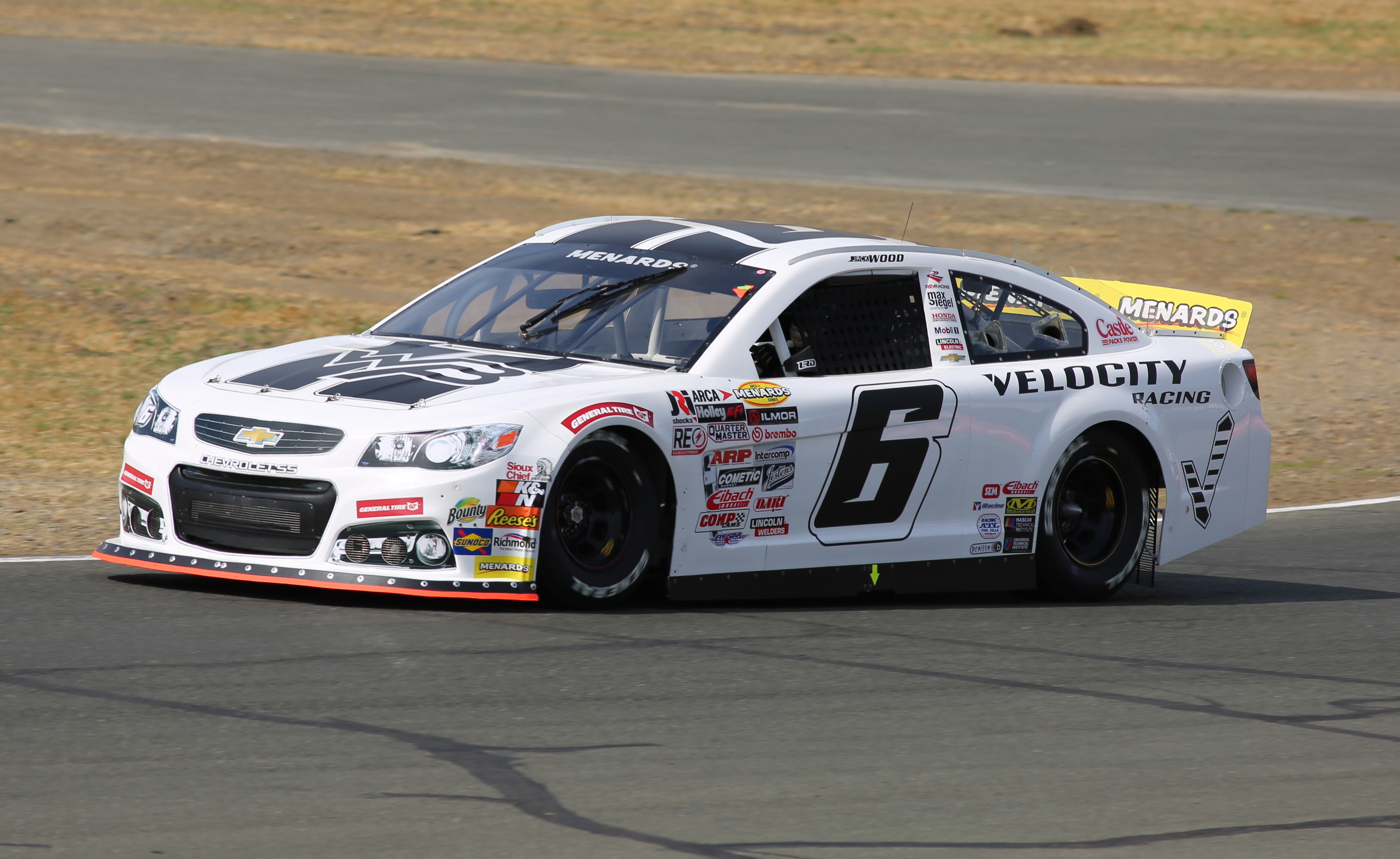
Wood's No. 6 ARCA car at Sonoma in 2023

In 2023, Wood drove part-time in the No. 6 car for Rev Racing in the main ARCA Menards Series, the East Series, and the West Series. In the main ARCA Series/East Series combination race at Bristol, Wood drove a third car for the team, the No. 51 (his Truck Series number with KBM), as Lavar Scott, who drove full-time for Rev in the East Series that year, was driving the No. 6 car. Wood also drove the No. 28 car for Pinnacle Racing Group in the West Series season finale at Phoenix.

On December 6, 2023, it was announced Wood would drive full-time in the ARCA Menards Series West in the No. 16 Chevy for Bill McAnally Racing.

On July 7, 2025, it was announced that Wood would drive the No. 16 at Sonoma for McAnally.

On December 17, 2025, it was announced that Wood would drive the No. 28 part-time for Pinnacle Racing Group, sharing the ride with anchor driver Carson Brown and former McAnally–Hilgemann Racing Truck Series teammate Connor Mosack.

=== NASCAR Craftsman Truck Series ===
On May 13, 2021, it was announced that Wood would make his NASCAR Truck Series debut for GMS in the team's No. 24 truck at Circuit of the Americas and would also run the next week's race at Charlotte. The opportunity came after the full-time driver of the No. 24, Raphaël Lessard, could no longer run a full season in that truck due to a lack of funding.

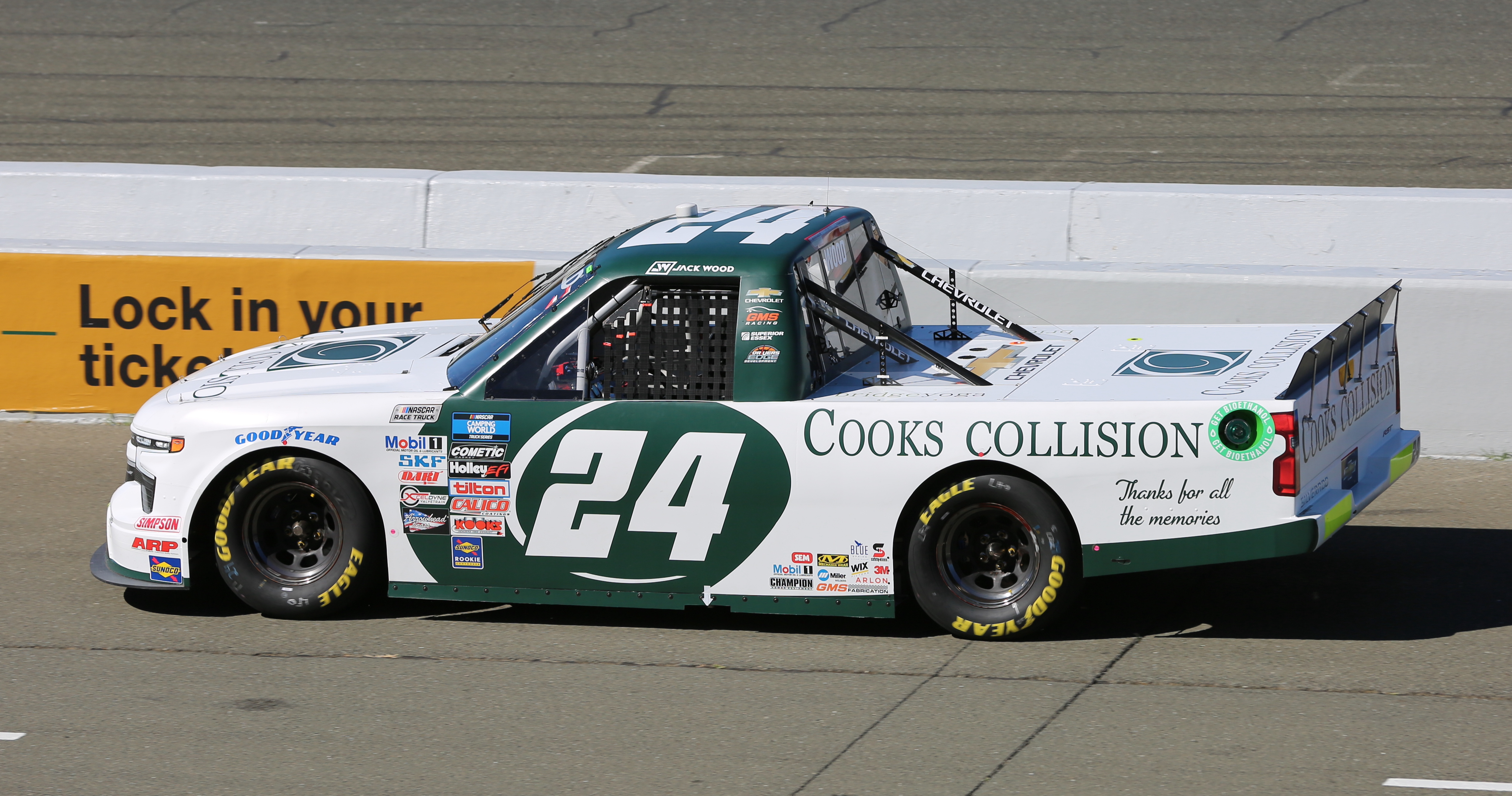
Wood's No. 24 truck at Sonoma Raceway in 2022

On June 10, 2021, GMS announced Wood would pilot the No. 24 truck for the remainder of the 2021 season (although the team would announce priorly that Chase Elliott would drive the No. 24 for Texas and GMS would replace Wood with Doug Coby at Bristol). He remained with the team in the No. 24 for the full Truck Series season in 2022.

On November 4, 2023, it was announced that Wood would drive part-time, being the anchor driver, in the No. 51 truck for Kyle Busch Motorsports featuring the team's first year with Chevrolet. He would end up sharing the ride with team owner Kyle Busch, William Byron, and Matt Mills.

On December 6, 2023, it was announced Wood would drive part-time for MHR in the Craftsman Truck Series in the No. 91 for the 2024 season. He would anchor the No. 91 while sharing the ride with Zane Smith, Vicente Salas, Connor Hall, Corey Day, and Ryan Reed.

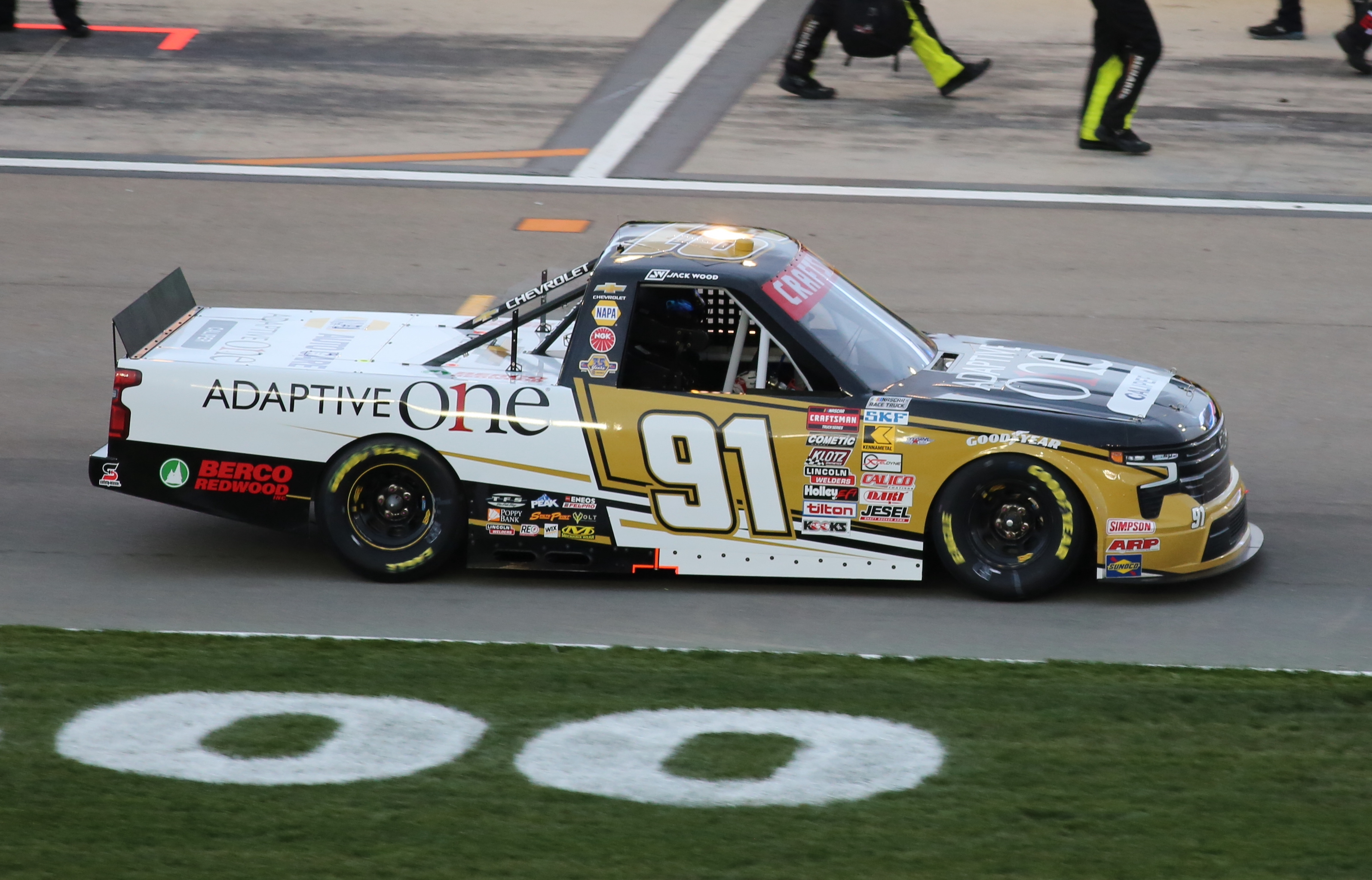
Wood's No. 91 truck at Las Vegas Motor Speedway in 2025

On December 17, 2024, it was announced that Wood would drive the No. 91 full-time in 2025 for MHR. Wood started the season with a 24th-place finish at Daytona. He would suffer an injury during the Watkins Glen race and he would therefore miss the race at Richmond, having his team withdraw the No. 91 for the weekend. After two top tens in the 2025 season, which came at Rockingham and at Phoenix, it was announced on November 20, 2025, that Wood would not return to the No. 91 and he would be replaced by Christian Eckes for the 2026 season.

== Personal life ==
Wood is the son of Lisa and Don Wood, a prominent businessman in Loomis, California. He has a brother, Samuel, and a sister, Megan. Megan was on the Equestrian Team at Baylor University. In 2021, his parents established the Don and Lisa Wood Family Trailblazers Endowed Scholarship Fund at Baylor University.

== Motorsports career results ==
=== Racing career summary ===
Season	Series	Team	Races	Wins	Top 5	Top 10	Points	Position
2019	NASCAR K&N Pro Series West	Velocity Racing	6	0	0	2	189	14th
2020	ARCA Menards Series West	Velocity Racing	8	0	1	6	319	11th
2021	CARS Late Model Stock Car Tour	GMS Racing	1	0	0	0	13	60th
2021	ARCA Menards Series West	GMS Racing	1	0	0	0	15	65th
2021	ARCA Menards Series East	GMS Racing	2	0	0	0	62	26th
2021	ARCA Menards Series	GMS Racing	8	0	1	4	253	15th
2021	NASCAR Camping World Truck Series	GMS Racing	12	0	0	1	150	29th
2022	ARCA Menards Series West	Bill McAnally Racing	1	0	1	1	40	50tj
2022	ARCA Menards Series	Bill McAnally Racing	1	0	0	0	19	117th
2022	NASCAR Camping World Truck Series	GMS Racing	23	0	0	0	279	24th
2023	ARCA Menards Series West	Pinnacle Racing Group	1	0	1	1	96	23rd
2023	ARCA Menards Series West	Rev Racing	2	0	1	1	96	23rd
2023	ARCA Menards Series East	Rev Racing	1	0	0	1	35	37th
2023	ARCA Menards Series	Rev Racing	8	0	2	6	320	13th
2023	NASCAR Craftsman Truck Series	Kyle Busch Motorsports	13	0	0	2	198	26th
2024	ARCA Menards Series West	Bill McAnally Racing	12	0	5	7	584	4th
2024	ARCA Menards Series	Bill McAnally Racing	1	0	0	1	37	80th
2024	NASCAR Craftsman Truck Series	McAnally-Hilgemann Racing	13	0	0	0	228	27th
2025	ARCA Menards Series West	Bill McAnally Racing	1	0	0	0	31	61st
2025	NASCAR Craftsman Truck Series	McAnally-Hilgemann Racing	24	0	0	2	443	19th
2026	ARCA Menards Series	Pinnacle Racing Group	3	0	0	2	100	43rd

=== NASCAR ===
(key) (Bold – Pole position awarded by qualifying time. Italics – Pole position earned by points standings or practice time. * – Most laps led.)

==== Craftsman Truck Series ====
NASCAR Craftsman Truck Series results
Year	Team	No.	Make	1	2	3	4	5	6	7	8	9	10	11	12	13	14	15	16	17	18	19	20	21	22	23	24	25	NCTC	Pts	Ref
2021	GMS Racing	24	Chevy	DAY	DRC	LVS	ATL	BRD	RCH	KAN	DAR	COA; 28	CLT; 15	TEX	NSH; 11	POC; 39	KNX; 39	GLN; 25	GTW; 10	DAR; 30	BRI	LVS; 30	TAL; 40	MAR; 27	PHO; 20				29th	150	
2022	GMS Racing	24	Chevy	DAY; 33	LVS; 32	ATL; 13	COA; 32	MAR; 35	BRD; 22	DAR; 18	KAN; 26	TEX; 16	CLT; 23	GTW; 19	SON; 16	KNX; 21	NSH; 35	MOH; 29	POC; 35	IRP; 25	RCH; 23	KAN; 26	BRI; 21	TAL; 19	HOM; 31	PHO; 29			24th	279	
2023	Kyle Busch Motorsports	51	Chevy	DAY; 27	LVS	ATL; 10	COA	TEX; 9	BRD	MAR	KAN	DAR	NWS	CLT; 18	GTW; 29	NSH; 30	MOH; 31	POC	RCH	IRP; 18	MLW	KAN; 16	BRI; 36	TAL; 14	HOM; 12	PHO; 27			26th	198	
2024	McAnally–Hilgemann Racing	91	Chevy	DAY; 18	ATL; 31	LVS	BRI	COA; 13	MAR; 18	TEX	KAN	DAR; 25	NWS; 12	CLT; 21	GTW	NSH; 16	POC	IRP; 15	RCH	MLW; 15	BRI; 26	KAN	TAL	HOM	MAR; 26	PHO; 35			27th	228	
2025	McAnally–Hilgemann Racing	91	Chevy	DAY; 24	ATL; 21	LVS; 30	HOM; 21	MAR; 19	BRI; 11	CAR; 7	TEX; 11	KAN; 24	NWS; 20	CLT; 25	NSH; 20	MCH; 20	POC; 14	LRP; 22	IRP; 20	GLN; 33	RCH; Wth	DAR; 14	BRI; 22	NHA; 22	ROV; 22	TAL; 21	MAR; 13	PHO; 10	19th	443	

^{*} Season still in progress
^{1} Ineligible for series points

=== ARCA Menards Series ===
(key) (Bold – Pole position awarded by qualifying time. Italics – Pole position earned by points standings or practice time. * – Most laps led.)

ARCA Menards Series results
Year	Team	No.	Make	1	2	3	4	5	6	7	8	9	10	11	12	13	14	15	16	17	18	19	20	AMSC	Pts	Ref
2021	GMS Racing	21	Chevy	DAY; 9	PHO; 29	TAL; 11	KAN; 4	TOL	CLT; 6	MOH	POC; 18	ELK	BLN	IOW	WIN	GLN; 10	MCH	ISF	MLW	DSF				15th	253	
2021	GMS Racing	22	Chevy																		BRI; 13	SLM	KAN	15th	253	
2022	Bill McAnally Racing	21	Toyota	DAY	PHO	TAL	KAN	CLT	IOW	BLN	ELK	MOH; 25	POC	IRP	MCH	GLN	ISF	MLW	DSF	KAN	BRI	SLM	TOL	117th	19	
2023	Rev Racing	6	Chevy	DAY; 8	PHO; 28	TAL; 6	KAN; 5	CLT; 10	BLN	ELK	MOH; 3	IOW	POC	MCH	IRP	GLN; 14	ISF	MLW	DSF	KAN				13th	320	
2023	Rev Racing	51	Chevy																		BRI; 9	SLM	TOL	13th	320	
2024	Bill McAnally Racing	16	Chevy	DAY	PHO; 7	TAL	DOV	KAN	CLT	IOW	MOH	BLN	IRP	SLM	ELK	MCH	ISF	MLW	DSF	GLN	BRI	KAN	TOL	80th	37	
2026	Pinnacle Racing Group	28	Chevy	DAY; 6	PHO	KAN; 18	TAL; 9	GLN	TOL	MCH	POC	BER	ELK	CHI	LRP	IRP	IOW	ISF	MAD	DSF	SLM	BRI	KAN	43rd	100	

==== ARCA Menards Series East ====
ARCA Menards Series East results
Year	Team	No.	Make	1	2	3	4	5	6	7	8	AMSEC	Pts	Ref
2021	GMS Racing	21	Chevy	NSM; 13	FIF	NSV	DOV	SNM	IOW	MLW		26th	62	
2021	GMS Racing	22	Chevy								BRI; 13	26th	62	
2023	Rev Racing	51	Chevy	FIF	DOV	NSV	FRS	IOW	IRP	MLW	BRI; 9	37th	35	

==== ARCA Menards Series West ====
ARCA Menards Series West results
Year	Team	No.	Make	1	2	3	4	5	6	7	8	9	10	11	12	13	14	AMSWC	Pts	Ref
2019	Velocity Racing	78	Ford	LVS	IRW; 10	TUS	TUS	CNS							AAS; 16			14th	189	
2019	Velocity Racing	78	Toyota						SON; 16	DCS	IOW	EVG; 9	GTW	MER		KCR; 13	PHO; 11	14th	189	
2020	Velocity Racing	78	Toyota	LVS; 7	MMP	MMP	IRW; 15	EVG; 8	DCS; 6	CNS; 5	LVS	AAS; 8	KCR; 10	PHO; 24				11th	319	
2021	GMS Racing	21	Chevy	PHO; 29	SON	IRW	CNS	IRW	PIR	LVS	AAS	PHO						65th	15	
2022	Bill McAnally Racing	21	Toyota	PHO	IRW	KCR	PIR	SON; 4	IRW	EVG	PIR	AAS	LVS	PHO				50th	40	
2023	Rev Racing	6	Chevy	PHO; 28	IRW	KCR	PIR	SON; 4	IRW	SHA	EVG	AAS	LVS	MAD				23rd	96	
2023	Pinnacle Racing Group	28	Chevy												PHO; 4			23rd	96	
2024	Bill McAnally Racing	16	Chevy	PHO; 7	KER; 12	PIR; 12	SON; 5	IRW; 14	IRW; 2	SHA; 6	TRI; 3	MAD; 12	AAS; 5	KER; 5	PHO; 11			4th	584	
2025	Bill McAnally Racing	16	Chevy	KER	PHO	TUC	CNS	KER	SON; 13	TRI	PIR	AAS	MAD	LVS	PHO			61st	31	

=== CARS Late Model Stock Car Tour ===
(key) (Bold – Pole position awarded by qualifying time. Italics – Pole position earned by points standings or practice time. * – Most laps led. ** – All laps led.)

CARS Late Model Stock Car Tour results
Year	Team	No.	Make	1	2	3	4	5	6	7	8	9	10	11	12	13	CLMSCTC	Pts	Ref
2021	GMS Racing	21	Chevy	DIL	HCY; 20	OCS	ACE	CRW	LGY	DOM	HCY	MMS	TCM	FLC	WKS	SBO	60th	13	
