= 2025 Mission 176 at The Glen =

17th race of the 2025 NASCAR Craftsman Truck Series

Race details
- Race 17 of 25 of the 2025 NASCAR Craftsman Truck Series
- Date: August 8, 2025
- Location: Watkins Glen International in Watkins Glen, New York
- Course: Permanent racing facility
- Course length: 2.454 miles (3.949 km)
- Distance: 81 laps, 198 mi (318 km)
- Scheduled distance: 72 laps, 176 mi (283 km)
- Average speed: 76.852 mph (123.681 km/h)

Pole position
| Driver | Corey Heim | Tricon Garage |
- Time: 1:10.953

Most laps led
| Driver | Corey Heim | Tricon Garage |
- Laps: 44

Winner
| No. 11 | Corey Heim | Tricon Garage |

Television in the United States
- Network: FS1
- Announcers: Jamie Little, Regan Smith and Michael Waltrip

Radio in the United States
- Radio: NRN

The 2025 Mission 176 at The Glen was the 17th stock car race of the 2025 NASCAR Craftsman Truck Series, and the 7th iteration of the event after a four-year absence of Truck racing at Watkins Glen International. The race was held on Friday, August 8, 2025, at Watkins Glen Internationalin Watkins Glen, New York, a 2.454 miles (3.949 km) permanent road course. The race was contested over 81 laps, extended from 72 laps due to a triple-overtime finish.

In a wild ending with numerous cautions, Corey Heim, driving for Tricon Garage, would survive a triple-overtime thriller and held off Daniel Hemric on the final lap to earn his 17th career NASCAR Craftsman Truck Series win, his sixth of the season, and his fourth consecutive win on a road course. Heim was the dominant driver of the race as well, winning the first stage and led a race-high 44 laps. Gio Ruggiero rounded out the podium in third, while Christopher Bell and Tyler Ankrum rounded out the top five.

== Report ==
=== Background ===
Watkins Glen International, the track where the race was held.

Watkins Glen International (nicknamed "The Glen") is an automobile race track located in Watkins Glen, New York at the southern tip of Seneca Lake. It was long known around the world as the home of the Formula One United States Grand Prix, which it hosted for twenty consecutive years (1961–1980), but the site has been home to road racing of nearly every class, including the World Sportscar Championship, Trans-Am, Can-Am, NASCAR Cup Series, the International Motor Sports Association and the IndyCar Series.

Initially, public roads in the village were used for the race course. In 1956 a permanent circuit for the race was built. In 1968 the race was extended to six hours, becoming the 6 Hours of Watkins Glen. The circuit's current layout has more or less been the same since 1971, although a chicane was installed at the uphill Esses in 1975 to slow cars through these corners, where there was a fatality during practice at the 1973 United States Grand Prix. The chicane was removed in 1985, but another chicane called the "Inner Loop" was installed in 1992 after J.D. McDuffie's fatal accident during the previous year's NASCAR Winston Cup event.

The circuit is known as the Mecca of North American road racing and is a very popular venue among fans and drivers. The facility is currently owned by International Speedway Corporation.

=== Entry list ===
- (R) denotes rookie driver.
- (i) denotes driver who is ineligible for series driver points.

| # | Driver | Team | Make |
|---|---|---|---|
| 1 | William Sawalich (i) | Tricon Garage | Toyota |
| 02 | Kaden Honeycutt | Young's Motorsports | Chevrolet |
| 2 | William Lambros | Reaume Brothers Racing | Ford |
| 5 | Toni Breidinger (R) | Tricon Garage | Toyota |
| 07 | Kyle Busch (i) | Spire Motorsports | Chevrolet |
| 7 | Sammy Smith (i) | Spire Motorsports | Chevrolet |
| 9 | Grant Enfinger | CR7 Motorsports | Chevrolet |
| 11 | Corey Heim | Tricon Garage | Toyota |
| 13 | Jake Garcia | ThorSport Racing | Ford |
| 15 | Tanner Gray | Tricon Garage | Toyota |
| 17 | Gio Ruggiero (R) | Tricon Garage | Toyota |
| 18 | Tyler Ankrum | McAnally-Hilgemann Racing | Chevrolet |
| 19 | Daniel Hemric | McAnally-Hilgemann Racing | Chevrolet |
| 22 | Gian Buffomante | Reaume Brothers Racing | Ford |
| 26 | Dawson Sutton (R) | Rackley W.A.R. | Chevrolet |
| 33 | Frankie Muniz (R) | Reaume Brothers Racing | Ford |
| 34 | Layne Riggs | Front Row Motorsports | Ford |
| 38 | Chandler Smith | Front Row Motorsports | Ford |
| 42 | Matt Mills | Niece Motorsports | Chevrolet |
| 44 | Ross Chastain (i) | Niece Motorsports | Chevrolet |
| 45 | Connor Zilisch (i) | Niece Motorsports | Chevrolet |
| 52 | Christopher Bell (i) | Halmar Friesen Racing | Toyota |
| 56 | Timmy Hill | Hill Motorsports | Toyota |
| 62 | Wesley Slimp | Halmar Friesen Racing | Toyota |
| 66 | Chris Buescher (i) | ThorSport Racing | Ford |
| 69 | Derek White | MBM Motorsports | Ford |
| 70 | Brent Crews | Brent Crews Motorsports | Toyota |
| 71 | Rajah Caruth | Spire Motorsports | Chevrolet |
| 75 | Parker Kligerman | Henderson Motorsports | Chevrolet |
| 76 | Spencer Boyd | Freedom Racing Enterprises | Chevrolet |
| 77 | Andrés Pérez de Lara (R) | Spire Motorsports | Chevrolet |
| 81 | Connor Mosack (R) | McAnally-Hilgemann Racing | Chevrolet |
| 88 | Matt Crafton | ThorSport Racing | Ford |
| 91 | Jack Wood | McAnally-Hilgemann Racing | Chevrolet |
| 98 | Ty Majeski | ThorSport Racing | Ford |
| 99 | Ben Rhodes | ThorSport Racing | Ford |
Official entry list

== Practice ==
The first and only practice session was held on Friday, August 8, at 11:35 AM EST, and would last for 50 minutes. Connor Zilisch, driving for Niece Motorsports, would set the fastest time in the session, with a lap of 1:12.487, and a speed of 121.677 mph (195.820 km/h).

| Pos. | # | Driver | Team | Make | Time | Speed |
|---|---|---|---|---|---|---|
| 1 | 45 | Connor Zilisch (i) | Niece Motorsports | Chevrolet | 1:12.487 | 121.677 |
| 2 | 11 | Corey Heim | Tricon Garage | Toyota | 1:12.498 | 121.659 |
| 3 | 70 | Brent Crews | Brent Crews Motorsports | Toyota | 1:12.663 | 121.382 |
Full practice results

== Qualifying ==
Qualifying will be held on Friday, August 8, at 12:40 PM EST. Since Watkins Glen International is a road course, the qualifying procedure used is a two-group system, with one round. Drivers will be separated into two groups, A and B. Each driver will have multiple laps to set a time. Whoever sets the fastest time between both groups will win the pole.

Under a 2021 rule change, the timing line in road course qualifying is "not" the start-finish line. Instead, the timing line for qualifying will be set at the exit of Turn 9. Corey Heim, driving for Tricon Garage, would score the pole for the race, with a lap of 1:10.953, and a speed of 124.308 mph (200.054 km/h).

No drivers would fail to qualify.

=== Qualifying results ===
| Pos. | # | Driver | Team | Make | Time | Speed |
|---|---|---|---|---|---|---|
| 1 | 11 | Corey Heim | Tricon Garage | Toyota | 1:10.953 | 124.308 |
| 2 | 52 | Christopher Bell (i) | Halmar Friesen Racing | Toyota | 1:11.145 | 123.972 |
| 3 | 7 | Sammy Smith (i) | Spire Motorsports | Chevrolet | 1:11.391 | 123.545 |
| 4 | 77 | Andrés Pérez de Lara (R) | Spire Motorsports | Chevrolet | 1:11.554 | 123.264 |
| 5 | 17 | Gio Ruggiero (R) | Tricon Garage | Toyota | 1:11.579 | 123.220 |
| 6 | 34 | Layne Riggs | Front Row Motorsports | Ford | 1:11.587 | 123.207 |
| 7 | 44 | Ross Chastain (i) | Niece Motorsports | Chevrolet | 1:11.591 | 123.200 |
| 8 | 38 | Chandler Smith | Front Row Motorsports | Ford | 1:11.614 | 123.160 |
| 9 | 99 | Ben Rhodes | ThorSport Racing | Ford | 1:11.725 | 122.970 |
| 10 | 81 | Connor Mosack (R) | McAnally-Hilgemann Racing | Chevrolet | 1:11.739 | 122.946 |
| 11 | 07 | Kyle Busch (i) | Spire Motorsports | Chevrolet | 1:11.955 | 122.577 |
| 12 | 15 | Tanner Gray | Tricon Garage | Toyota | 1:11.966 | 122.558 |
| 13 | 18 | Tyler Ankrum | McAnally-Hilgemann Racing | Chevrolet | 1:12.043 | 122.427 |
| 14 | 45 | Connor Zilisch (i) | Niece Motorsports | Chevrolet | 1:12.134 | 122.272 |
| 15 | 13 | Jake Garcia | ThorSport Racing | Ford | 1:12.146 | 122.252 |
| 16 | 1 | William Sawalich (i) | Tricon Garage | Toyota | 1:12.180 | 122.195 |
| 17 | 19 | Daniel Hemric | McAnally-Hilgemann Racing | Chevrolet | 1:12.342 | 121.921 |
| 18 | 75 | Parker Kligerman | Henderson Motorsports | Chevrolet | 1:12.361 | 121.889 |
| 19 | 70 | Brent Crews | Brent Crews Motorsports | Toyota | 1:12.432 | 121.769 |
| 20 | 71 | Rajah Caruth | Spire Motorsports | Chevrolet | 1:12.481 | 121.687 |
| 21 | 66 | Chris Buescher (i) | ThorSport Racing | Ford | 1:12.514 | 121.632 |
| 22 | 26 | Dawson Sutton (R) | Rackley W.A.R. | Chevrolet | 1:12.517 | 121.627 |
| 23 | 91 | Jack Wood | McAnally-Hilgemann Racing | Chevrolet | 1:12.551 | 121.570 |
| 24 | 88 | Matt Crafton | ThorSport Racing | Ford | 1:12.701 | 121.319 |
| 25 | 42 | Matt Mills | Niece Motorsports | Chevrolet | 1:13.088 | 120.676 |
| 26 | 56 | Timmy Hill | Hill Motorsports | Toyota | 1:13.659 | 119.741 |
| 27 | 2 | William Lambros | Reaume Brothers Racing | Ford | 1:13.980 | 119.221 |
| 28 | 5 | Toni Breidinger (R) | Tricon Garage | Toyota | 1:14.180 | 118.900 |
| 29 | 62 | Wesley Slimp | Halmar Friesen Racing | Toyota | 1:14.408 | 118.536 |
| 30 | 76 | Spencer Boyd | Freedom Racing Enterprises | Chevrolet | 1:16.362 | 115.502 |
| 31 | 69 | Derek White | MBM Motorsports | Ford | 1:19.626 | 110.768 |
Qualified by owner's points
| 32 | 9 | Grant Enfinger | CR7 Motorsports | Chevrolet | – | – |
| 33 | 98 | Ty Majeski | ThorSport Racing | Ford | – | – |
| 34 | 33 | Frankie Muniz (R) | Reaume Brothers Racing | Ford | – | – |
| 35 | 02 | Kaden Honeycutt | Young's Motorsports | Chevrolet | – | – |
| 36 | 22 | Gian Buffomante | Reaume Brothers Racing | Ford | – | – |
Official qualifying results
Official starting lineup

== Race results ==
Stage 1 Laps: 20

| Pos. | # | Driver | Team | Make | Pts |
|---|---|---|---|---|---|
| 1 | 11 | Corey Heim | Tricon Garage | Toyota | 10 |
| 2 | 44 | Ross Chastain (i) | Niece Motorsports | Chevrolet | 0 |
| 3 | 52 | Christopher Bell (i) | Halmar Friesen Racing | Toyota | 0 |
| 4 | 45 | Connor Zilisch (i) | Niece Motorsports | Chevrolet | 0 |
| 5 | 99 | Ben Rhodes | ThorSport Racing | Ford | 6 |
| 6 | 17 | Gio Ruggiero (R) | Tricon Garage | Toyota | 5 |
| 7 | 1 | William Sawalich (i) | Tricon Garage | Toyota | 0 |
| 8 | 19 | Daniel Hemric | McAnally-Hilgemann Racing | Chevrolet | 3 |
| 9 | 34 | Layne Riggs | Front Row Motorsports | Ford | 2 |
| 10 | 81 | Connor Mosack (R) | McAnally-Hilgemann Racing | Chevrolet | 1 |

Stage 2 Laps: 20

| Pos. | # | Driver | Team | Make | Pts |
|---|---|---|---|---|---|
| 1 | 99 | Ben Rhodes | ThorSport Racing | Ford | 10 |
| 2 | 7 | Sammy Smith (i) | Spire Motorsports | Chevrolet | 0 |
| 3 | 1 | William Sawalich (i) | Tricon Garage | Toyota | 0 |
| 4 | 11 | Corey Heim | Tricon Garage | Toyota | 7 |
| 5 | 52 | Christopher Bell (i) | Halmar Friesen Racing | Toyota | 0 |
| 6 | 15 | Tanner Gray | Tricon Garage | Toyota | 5 |
| 7 | 98 | Ty Majeski | ThorSport Racing | Ford | 4 |
| 8 | 75 | Parker Kligerman | Henderson Motorsports | Chevrolet | 3 |
| 9 | 18 | Tyler Ankrum | McAnally-Hilgemann Racing | Chevrolet | 2 |
| 10 | 81 | Connor Mosack (R) | McAnally-Hilgemann Racing | Chevrolet | 1 |

Stage 3 Laps: 41

| Fin | St | # | Driver | Team | Make | Laps | Led | Status | Pts |
|---|---|---|---|---|---|---|---|---|---|
| 1 | 1 | 11 | Corey Heim | Tricon Garage | Toyota | 81 | 44 | Running | 57 |
| 2 | 17 | 19 | Daniel Hemric | McAnally-Hilgemann Racing | Chevrolet | 81 | 1 | Running | 38 |
| 3 | 5 | 17 | Gio Ruggiero (R) | Tricon Garage | Toyota | 81 | 2 | Running | 39 |
| 4 | 2 | 52 | Christopher Bell (i) | Halmar Friesen Racing | Toyota | 81 | 30 | Running | 0 |
| 5 | 13 | 18 | Tyler Ankrum | McAnally-Hilgemann Racing | Chevrolet | 81 | 0 | Running | 34 |
| 6 | 3 | 7 | Sammy Smith (i) | Spire Motorsports | Chevrolet | 81 | 1 | Running | 0 |
| 7 | 33 | 98 | Ty Majeski | ThorSport Racing | Ford | 81 | 0 | Running | 34 |
| 8 | 14 | 45 | Connor Zilisch (i) | Niece Motorsports | Chevrolet | 81 | 0 | Running | 0 |
| 9 | 25 | 42 | Matt Mills | Niece Motorsports | Chevrolet | 81 | 0 | Running | 28 |
| 10 | 6 | 34 | Layne Riggs | Front Row Motorsports | Ford | 81 | 0 | Running | 29 |
| 11 | 16 | 1 | William Sawalich (i) | Tricon Garage | Toyota | 81 | 0 | Running | 0 |
| 12 | 29 | 62 | Wesley Slimp | Halmar Friesen Racing | Toyota | 81 | 0 | Running | 25 |
| 13 | 24 | 88 | Matt Crafton | ThorSport Racing | Ford | 81 | 0 | Running | 24 |
| 14 | 22 | 26 | Dawson Sutton (R) | Rackley W.A.R. | Chevrolet | 81 | 0 | Running | 23 |
| 15 | 15 | 13 | Jake Garcia | ThorSport Racing | Ford | 81 | 0 | Running | 22 |
| 16 | 10 | 81 | Connor Mosack (R) | McAnally-Hilgemann Racing | Chevrolet | 81 | 0 | Running | 23 |
| 17 | 19 | 70 | Brent Crews | Brent Crews Motorsports | Toyota | 81 | 0 | Running | 20 |
| 18 | 30 | 76 | Spencer Boyd | Freedom Racing Enterprises | Chevrolet | 81 | 0 | Running | 19 |
| 19 | 31 | 69 | Derek White | MBM Motorsports | Ford | 81 | 0 | Running | 18 |
| 20 | 26 | 56 | Timmy Hill | Hill Motorsports | Toyota | 81 | 0 | Running | 17 |
| 21 | 4 | 77 | Andrés Pérez de Lara (R) | Spire Motorsports | Chevrolet | 81 | 0 | Running | 17 |
| 22 | 21 | 66 | Chris Buescher (i) | ThorSport Racing | Ford | 78 | 0 | Running | 0 |
| 23 | 8 | 38 | Chandler Smith | Front Row Motorsports | Ford | 77 | 0 | Running | 14 |
| 24 | 32 | 9 | Grant Enfinger | CR7 Motorsports | Chevrolet | 76 | 0 | Accident | 13 |
| 25 | 36 | 22 | Gian Buffomante | Reaume Brothers Racing | Ford | 75 | 0 | Running | 12 |
| 26 | 9 | 99 | Ben Rhodes | ThorSport Racing | Ford | 68 | 3 | Accident | 27 |
| 27 | 34 | 33 | Frankie Muniz (R) | Reaume Brothers Racing | Ford | 66 | 0 | Running | 10 |
| 28 | 12 | 15 | Tanner Gray | Tricon Garage | Toyota | 64 | 0 | Accident | 14 |
| 29 | 28 | 5 | Toni Breidinger (R) | Tricon Garage | Toyota | 58 | 0 | Engine | 8 |
| 30 | 7 | 44 | Ross Chastain (i) | Niece Motorsports | Chevrolet | 51 | 0 | Fuel Pump | 0 |
| 31 | 18 | 75 | Parker Kligerman | Henderson Motorsports | Chevrolet | 47 | 0 | Suspension | 9 |
| 32 | 20 | 71 | Rajah Caruth | Spire Motorsports | Chevrolet | 36 | 0 | Brakes | 5 |
| 33 | 23 | 91 | Jack Wood | McAnally-Hilgemann Racing | Chevrolet | 35 | 0 | Accident | 4 |
| 34 | 35 | 02 | Kaden Honeycutt | Young's Motorsports | Chevrolet | 29 | 0 | Drivetrain | 3 |
| 35 | 27 | 2 | William Lambros | Reaume Brothers Racing | Ford | 21 | 0 | Suspension | 2 |
| 36 | 11 | 07 | Kyle Busch (i) | Spire Motorsports | Chevrolet | 13 | 0 | Seating | 0 |
Official race results

== Standings after the race ==
Drivers' Championship standings

| | Pos | Driver | Points |
|---|---|---|---|
| | 1 | Corey Heim | 792 |
| 1 | 2 | Layne Riggs | 614 (–178) |
| 1 | 3 | Chandler Smith | 606 (–186) |
| | 4 | Daniel Hemric | 582 (–210) |
| | 5 | Grant Enfinger | 549 (–243) |
| 1 | 6 | Ty Majeski | 542 (–250) |
| 1 | 7 | Tyler Ankrum | 536 (–256) |
| 2 | 8 | Kaden Honeycutt | 523 (–269) |
| | 9 | Jake Garcia | 469 (–323) |
| | 10 | Ben Rhodes | 458 (–334) |
Official driver's standings

Manufacturers' Championship standings

| Pos | Manufacturer | Points |
|---|---|---|
| 1 | Chevrolet | 616 |
| 2 | Toyota | 611 (–5) |
| 3 | Ford | 590 (–26) |

- Note: Only the first 10 positions are included for the driver standings.

| Previous race: 2025 TSport 200 | NASCAR Craftsman Truck Series; 2025 season | Next race: 2025 eero 250 |
