= Brent Crews =

American racing driver (born 2008)

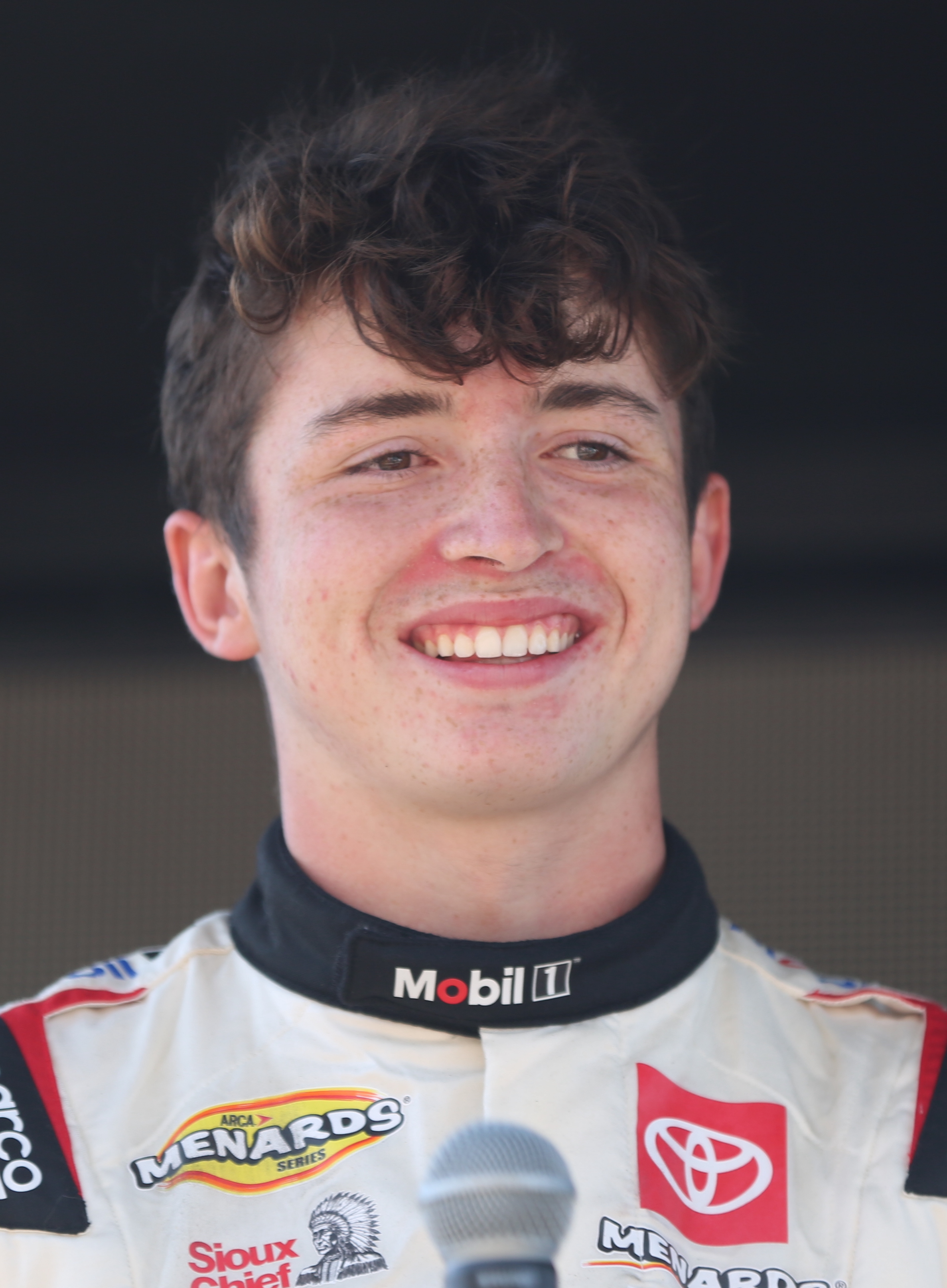
- Crews at Sonoma Raceway in 2024
- Born: Brent Anderson Crews; March 30, 2008 (age 18); Hickory, North Carolina, U.S.
- Height: 5 ft 9 in (1.75 m)
- Weight: 160 lb (73 kg)
- Achievements: 2023 SCCA Trans-Am TA2 ProAm Series Champion; 2024 World Series of Asphalt Super Late Model Champion, Cars Tour LMSC Rookie of the Year; 2016 United States Pro Kart Series Rookie Champion; 2017 Rotax Grand Nationals Micro Max Champion; 2024 Orange Blossom 100 Winner; 2024 Red Eye 100 Winner; 2023 Chad McDaniel Memorial Winner; Youngest POWRi Lucas Oil National Midget Series Winner (13 years, 3 months, 18 days); Youngest Trans-Am Series Champion (15 years, 7 months, 3 days); Youngest Trans-Am Series Winner (14 years, 3 months, 6 days)
- Awards: 2024 CARS Late Model Stock Car Tour Rookie of the Year

NASCAR O'Reilly Auto Parts Series career
- 29 races run over 1 year
- Car no., team: No. 19 (Joe Gibbs Racing)
- 2026 position: 13th
- Best finish: 13th (2026)
- First race: 2026 Focused Health 250 (Austin)
- Last race: 2026 O'Reilly Auto Parts 300 (Homestead)
Wins	Top tens	Poles
0	18	1

NASCAR FedEx Freight Truck Series career
- 14 races run over 2 years
- Truck no., team: No. 1/5 (Tricon Garage)
- 2026 position: 101st
- Best finish: 25th (2025)
- First race: 2025 Window World 250 (North Wilkesboro)
- Last race: 2026 Zero Carbon Bioethanol 150 (Phoenix)
Wins	Top tens	Poles
0	6	1

ARCA Menards Series career
- 17 races run over 3 years
- Best finish: 11th (2025)
- First race: 2023 General Tire 100 at The Glen (Watkins Glen)
- Last race: 2025 Bush's Beans 200 (Bristol)
- First win: 2023 Dutch Boy 100 (Springfield)
- Last win: 2025 Bush's Beans 200 (Bristol)
Wins	Top tens	Poles
6	13	4

ARCA Menards Series East career
- 6 races run over 2 years
- Best finish: 7th (2025)
- First race: 2024 General Tire 150 (Dover)
- Last race: 2025 Bush's Beans 200 (Bristol)
- First win: 2025 Rockingham ARCA 125 (Rockingham)
- Last win: 2025 Bush's Beans 200 (Bristol)
Wins	Top tens	Poles
3	4	3

ARCA Menards Series West career
- 5 races run over 2 years
- Best finish: 24th (2025)
- First race: 2024 General Tire 200 (Sonoma)
- Last race: 2025 Desert Diamond Casino West Valley 100 (Phoenix)
- First win: 2025 General Tire 150 (Phoenix)
- Last win: 2025 Desert Diamond Casino West Valley 100 (Phoenix)
Wins	Top tens	Poles
2	4	1
- Statistics up to date as of November 7, 2026.

Brent Anderson Crews (born March 30, 2008) is an American professional dirt track, sports car and stock car racing driver and owner. He competes full-time in the NASCAR O'Reilly Auto Parts Series, driving the No. 19 Toyota GR Supra for Joe Gibbs Racing and part-time in the NASCAR Craftsman Truck Series, driving the No. 1/5 Toyota Tundra TRD Pro for Tricon Garage.

Crews, a member of Toyota Racing Development's TD2 driver development program, had previously competed in the SCCA Trans-Am TA2 ProAm Series before selling his cars to form his own NASCAR Truck Series team in 2025, known as Brent Crews Motorsports. He also previously competed in the ARCA Menards Series and the CARS Late Model Stock Tour.

== Racing career ==
=== Early career ===
Crews began racing go-karts at the GoPro Motorplex in Mooresville, North Carolina at a young age. In 2016, he competed in the United States Pro Kart Series (USPKS) rookie class, winning the championship. Crews won the IAME International World Finals in 2017 and 2018. Crews would also win a Micro MAX World Championship Rotax Max Challenge race in Brazil in 2018. He then followed that victory up with a SuperKarts! USA SuperNationals victory in Mini Swift. Then in 2019, Crews won his second straight SuperNationals in the KA100 Junior division. In 2021, he became the youngest National Champion in the KZ Pro Shifter Class, leaving his total National Championship count at twelve.

=== Dirt cars ===
Crews made his outlaw kart debut in 2016, working his way quickly from Box Stocks all the way to the Open Class. He became the first to win in every outlaw kart class at Millbridge Speedway in 2019. He also won the Outlaw Kart Nationals in Knoxville, Iowa. On March 2, 2021, it was announced that Crews would run full time in the POWRi Lucas Oil National Midget Series, driving the 86 Toyota for CB Industries. He earned his first win of the season at Valley Speedway, becoming the youngest driver to win a POWRi National Midget Series race, at 13 years old. He would also score wins at Federated Auto Parts Raceway at I-55, Jacksonville Speedway, and Sweet Springs Motorsports Complex.

=== Trans-Am Series ===
In 2022, Crews would re-join Nitro Motorsports to run a full season in the SCCA Trans-Am TA2 ProAm Series. He scored his first career pole and win mid-season at Road America, becoming the youngest driver to win a Trans-Am Series race, at 14 years, three months, and four days. He would also score wins at the Music City Grand Prix and Virginia International Raceway, and finishing third in the final standings. He returned to Nitro for the 2023 season, scoring wins at NOLA Motorsports Park, the Detroit Street Circuit, Road America, and Watkins Glen. He clinched the 2023 championship after finishing fourth at Circuit of the Americas, becoming the youngest champion in TA2 history. In 2024, he added three more wins in only five races and leads the series in wins since joining.

=== Late models ===
Crews would make his late model racing debut in the CARS Pro Late Model Tour in 2022, driving the No. 24 Toyota Camry for Donnie Wilson Motorsports at Caraway Speedway. He would start eighth and finish fourteenth after experiencing a clutch issue. He ran two more races at Motor Mile and South Boston, finishing eighth and twelfth, respectively. On February 14, 2024, it was announced that Crews would compete in six races of the World Series of Asphalt Stock Car Racing at New Smyrna Speedway. Crews finished first in the point standings in his first time racing a Super Late Model after earning two wins and an average finish of 2.0. He also went on to tie the CARS Tour Late Model Stock class in wins in 2024, winning races at Orange County Speedway, Caraway Speedway, and Ace Speedway, earning Rookie of the Year honors, and finishing fifth in driver's points.

=== ARCA ===
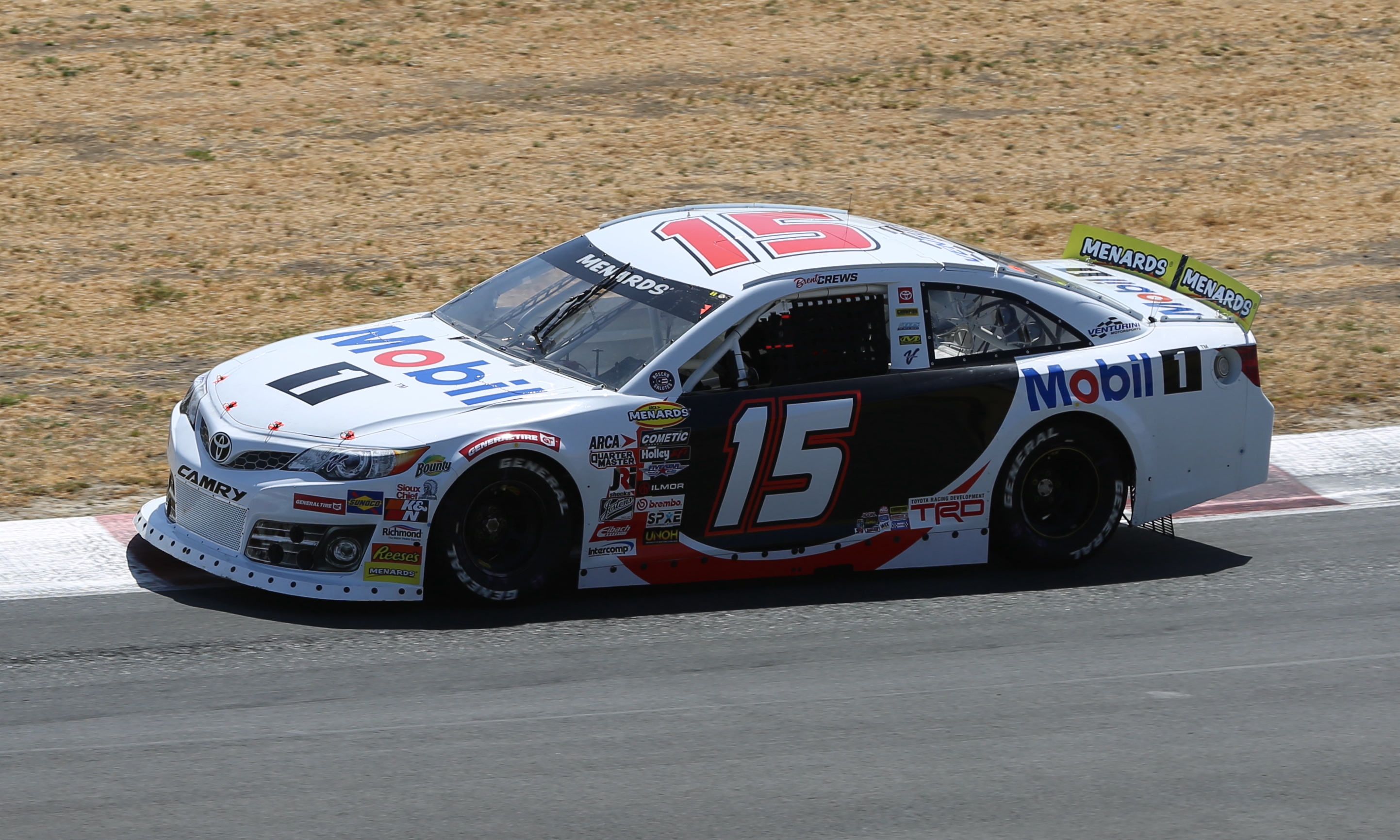
Crews' No. 15 car at Sonoma Raceway in 2024

On August 10, 2023, it was announced that Crews would make his ARCA Menards Series debut at Watkins Glen, driving the No. 25 Toyota for Venturini Motorsports. Crews would finish third after running inside the top five in the entire race. He made his second start of the season at the Illinois State Fairgrounds, where he would go on to dominate, leading the most laps and winning the race, becoming the second-youngest driver to win in ARCA. Crews returned to Venturini in 2024 to run part-time in ARCA again. That year, he won the main ARCA Series race at the DuQuoin State Fairgrounds, the other dirt race on the series schedule, leading every single lap in the race en route to the win.

On January 8, 2025, Joe Gibbs Racing announced that Crews would drive for them part-time in all three ARCA Series in 2025. That year, he won the ARCA and ARCA West combination race at Phoenix, the ARCA East Series race at Rockingham, the ARCA and ARCA East combination race at IRP, Springfield, the ARCA and ARCA East combination race at Bristol, and the ARCA West standalone race at Phoenix.

=== NASCAR ===
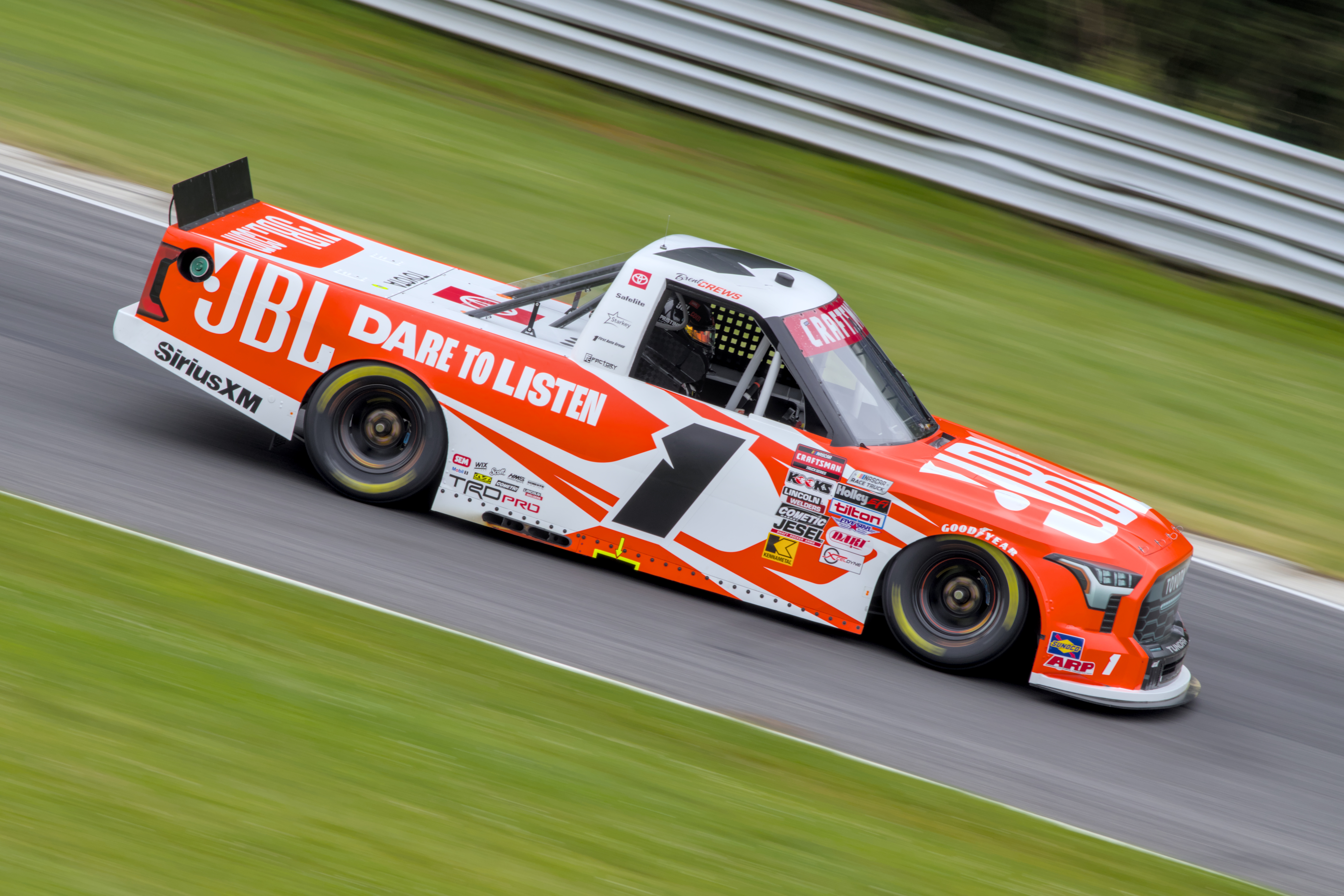
Crews' No. 1 truck at Lime Rock Park in 2025

Crews during practice for the Zero Carbon Bioethanol 150 Powered by POET at Phoenix Raceway.

On January 6, 2025, Tricon Garage announced that Crews would make his NASCAR Craftsman Truck Series debut for the team in their No. 1 truck in 2025. On August 1, Crews announced he had formed his own Truck Series team, which would debut at Watkins Glen. With three top-ten finishes, he finished 25th in points. In 2026, he returned to Tricon and drove the No. 1 and 5 trucks in a total of four races where he scored 3 top tens including a 3rd at Kansas.

On November 24, 2025, it was announced that Crews will drive the No. 19 Toyota for Joe Gibbs Racing nearly full-time in 2026. Due to his age, he sat out for four races early in the year before remaining in the car for the rest of the season beginning at Martinsville. Following Texas, he won the Dash 4 Cash bonus. At San Diego, he scored his first career pole.

== Motorsports career results ==
=== Career summary ===
Season	Series	Team	Races	Wins	Top 5	Top 10	Points	Position
2022	Trans-Am Series - TA2	Nitro Motorsports	12	3	7	7	236	**3rd**
2022	CARS Pro Late Model Tour	Donnie Wilson Racing	3	0	0	1	66	16th
2023	Trans-Am Series - TA2	Nitro Motorsports	13	4	9	11	1079	**1st**
2023	CARS Pro Late Model Tour	Donnie Wilson Racing	3	0	2	3	114	18th
2023	CARS Late Model Stock Car Tour	Lee Faulk Racing	2	0	0	0	25	45th
2023	ARCA Menards Series	Venturini Motorsports	4	1	3	3	166	27th
2024	Trans-Am Series - TA2	Nitro Motorsports	4	2	3	3	367	13th
2024	CARS Late Model Stock Car Tour	Kevin Harvick Inc.	16	3	4	8	396	5th
2024	ARCA Menards Series West	Venturini Motorsports	3	0	2	2	102	25th
2024	ARCA Menards Series East	Venturini Motorsports	1	0	0	0	28	53rd
2024	ARCA Menards Series	Venturini Motorsports	4	1	3	3	160	27th
2025	Trans-Am Series - TA2	Brent Crews Motorsports	2	1	1	2	186	21st
2025	ARCA Menards Series West	Joe Gibbs Racing	2	2	2	2	96	24th
2025	ARCA Menards Series East	Joe Gibbs Racing	5	3	4	4	262	7th
2025	ARCA Menards Series	Nitro Motorsports	2	1	1	1	365	11th
2025	ARCA Menards Series	Joe Gibbs Racing	7	3	4	6	365	11th
2025	NASCAR Craftsman Truck Series	Tricon Garage	9	0	2	3	257	25th
2025	NASCAR Craftsman Truck Series	Brent Crews Motorsports	1	0	0	0	257	25th
2026	ASA STARS National Tour	Casey Caudill	1	0	0	1	46*	54th*
2026	NASCAR Craftsman Truck Series	Tricon Garage	3	0	1	2	0	NC†
2026	NASCAR O'Reilly Auto Parts Series	Joe Gibbs Racing	29	0	12	18	878	13th

^{†} As Crews was a guest driver, he was ineligible for championship points.

=== NASCAR ===
(key) (Bold – Pole position awarded by qualifying time. Italics – Pole position earned by points standings or practice time. * – Most laps led.)

==== Cup Series ====
NASCAR Cup Series results
Year	Team	No.	Make	1	2	3	4	5	6	7	8	9	10	11	12	13	14	15	16	17	18	19	20	21	22	23	24	25	26	27	28	29	30	31	32	33	34	35	36	NCSC	Pts	Ref
2026	Joe Gibbs Racing	20	Toyota	DAY	ATL	COA	PHO	LVS	DAR	MAR	BRI	KAN	TAL	TEX	GLN	CLT	NSH	MCH	POC	COR; RL^{†}	SON	CHI	ATL	NWS	IND	IOW	RCH	NHA	DAY	DAR	GTW	BRI	KAN	LVS	CLT	PHO	TAL	MAR	HOM	N/A	0	
^{†} – Relieved Christopher Bell

==== O'Reilly Auto Parts Series ====
NASCAR O'Reilly Auto Parts Series results
Year	Team	No.	Make	1	2	3	4	5	6	7	8	9	10	11	12	13	14	15	16	17	18	19	20	21	22	23	24	25	26	27	28	29	30	31	32	33	NOAPSC	Pts	Ref
2026	Joe Gibbs Racing	19	Toyota	DAY	ATL	COA; 6	PHO; 18	LVS	DAR	MAR; 10	CAR; 26	BRI; 3	KAN; 5	TAL; 2	TEX; 4	GLN; 6*	DOV; 22	CLT; 37	NSH; 2	POC; 2	**COR**; 31	SON; 3	CHI; 4	ATL; 24	IND; 6	IOW; 16	DAY; 35	DAR; 3	GTW; 7	BRI; 3	LVS; 4	CLT; 30	PHO; 20	TAL; 34	MAR; 9	HOM; 3	13th	878	

==== Craftsman Truck Series ====
NASCAR Craftsman Truck Series results
Year	Team	No.	Make	1	2	3	4	5	6	7	8	9	10	11	12	13	14	15	16	17	18	19	20	21	22	23	24	25	NCTC	Pts	Ref
2025	Tricon Garage	1	Toyota	DAY	ATL	LVS	HOM	MAR	BRI	CAR	TEX	KAN	NWS; 22	CLT	NSH	MCH	POC	LRP; 8	IRP; 23		RCH; 16	DAR	BRI; 24	NHA; 17	ROV; 2*	TAL	MAR; 4	PHO; 28	25th	257	
2025	Brent Crews Motorsports	70	Toyota																	GLN; 17									25th	257	
2026	Tricon Garage	1	Toyota	DAY	ATL	STP	DAR	CAR	BRI	TEX	**GLN**; 7	DOV	CLT	NSH	MCH	COR	LRP	NWS	IRP	RCH	NHA	BRI		CLT; 20	PHO; 10	TAL	MAR	HOM	101st	0^{1}	
2026	Tricon Garage	5	Toyota																				KAN; 3						101st	0^{1}	

^{*} Season still in progress
^{1} Ineligible for series points

=== ARCA Menards Series ===
(key) (Bold – Pole position awarded by qualifying time. Italics – Pole position earned by points standings or practice time. * – Most laps led. ** – All laps led.)

ARCA Menards Series results
Year	Team	No.	Make	1	2	3	4	5	6	7	8	9	10	11	12	13	14	15	16	17	18	19	20	AMSC	Pts	Ref
2023	Venturini Motorsports	25	Toyota	DAY	PHO	TAL	KAN	CLT	BLN	ELK	MOH	IOW	POC	MCH	IRP	GLN; 3	**ISF**; 1*	MLW	DSF; 2	KAN	BRI	SLM; 12	TOL	27th	166	
2024	Venturini Motorsports	55	Toyota	DAY	PHO	TAL	DOV; 16	KAN	CLT	IOW	MOH; 2*	BLN	IRP	SLM	ELK	MCH	ISF	MLW					TOL; 4	27th	160	
2024	Venturini Motorsports	20	Toyota																DSF; 1**	GLN	BRI	KAN		27th	160	
2025	Joe Gibbs Racing	18	Toyota	DAY	PHO; 1	TAL	KAN	CLT	MCH	BLN	ELK	LRP; 6	DOV; 21	IRP; 1	**IOW**; 2	**GLN**; 9*				**BRI**; 1**	SLM	KAN	TOL	11th	365	
2025	Nitro Motorsports	70	Toyota														ISF; 1*	MAD	DSF; 15*					11th	365	

==== ARCA Menards Series East ====
ARCA Menards Series East results
Year	Team	No.	Make	1	2	3	4	5	6	7	8	AMSEC	Pts	Ref
2024	Venturini Motorsports	55	Toyota	FIF	DOV; 16	NSV	FRS	IOW	IRP	MLW	BRI	53rd	28	
2025	Joe Gibbs Racing	81	Toyota	FIF	**CAR**; 1*	NSV	FRS					7th	262	
2025	Joe Gibbs Racing	18	Toyota					DOV; 21	IRP; 1	**IOW**; 2	**BRI**; 1**	7th	262	

==== ARCA Menards Series West ====
ARCA Menards Series West results
Year	Team	No.	Make	1	2	3	4	5	6	7	8	9	10	11	12	AMSWC	Pts	Ref
2024	Venturini Motorsports	15	Toyota	PHO	KER	PIR	SON; 23	IRW	IRW	SHA	TRI	MAD	AAS			25th	102	
2024	Venturini Motorsports	20	Toyota											KER; 2		25th	102	
2024	Venturini Motorsports	22	Toyota												PHO; 5	25th	102	
2025	Joe Gibbs Racing	18	Toyota	KER	PHO; 1	TUC	CNS	KER	SON	TRI	PIR	AAS	MAD	LVS	**PHO**; 1**	24th	96	

=== CARS Late Model Stock Car Tour ===
(key) (Bold – Pole position awarded by qualifying time. Italics – Pole position earned by points standings or practice time. * – Most laps led. ** – All laps led.)

CARS Late Model Stock Car Tour results
Year	Team	No.	Make	1	2	3	4	5	6	7	8	9	10	11	12	13	14	15	16	CLMSCTC	Pts	Ref
2023	Lee Faulk Racing	5	Toyota	SNM	FLC	HCY	ACE	NWS	LGY	DOM	CRW	HCY; 24	ACE; 17	TCM	WKS	AAS	SBO	TCM	CRW	45th	25	
2024	Kevin Harvick Inc.	29	Toyota	SNM; 6*	HCY; 9	AAS; 16	OCS; 1	ACE; 15	TCM; 7	LGY; 2	CRW; 1	HCY; 19	NWS; 9	ACE; 1	WKS; 14*	FLC; 21	SBO; 15	TCM; 25	NWS; 11	5th	396	

=== CARS Pro Late Model Tour ===
(key)

CARS Pro Late Model Tour results
Year	Team	No.	Make	1	2	3	4	5	6	7	8	9	10	11	12	13	CPLMTC	Pts	Ref
2022	Donnie Wilson Racing	24	Toyota	CRW; 14	HCY	GPS	FCS	TCM	HCY	ACE	MMS; 8	TCM	ACE	SBO; 12	CRW		16th	66	
2023	Donnie Wilson Racing	24	Toyota	SNM	HCY; 2		NWS; 6	TCM	DIL	CRW	WKS	HCY	TCM	SBS	TCM	CRW	18th	114	
2023	Donnie Wilson Racing	28	Toyota			ACE; 5											18th	114	

=== ASA STARS National Tour ===
(key) (Bold – Pole position awarded by qualifying time. Italics – Pole position earned by points standings or practice time. * – Most laps led. ** – All laps led.)

ASA STARS National Tour results
Year	Team	No.	Make	1	2	3	4	5	6	7	8	9	10	11	12	ASNTC	Pts	Ref
2024	Wilson Motorsports	24	Toyota	NSM; 4	FIF	**HCY**; 18*	MAD	MLW	AND	OWO	TOL	WIN	NSV			23rd	131	
2026	Casey Caudill	33	Toyota	NSM	FIF	HCY	SLG	MAD	NPS	OWO	TRI; 10	WIN	NSV	NSM		-*	-*	
