= 2023 General Tire 100 at The Glen =

13th race of the 2023 ARCA Menards Series

Race details
- Race 13 of 20 of the 2023 ARCA Menards Series
- Date: August 18, 2023
- Official name: 3rd Annual General Tire 100 at The Glen
- Location: Watkins Glen International, Watkins Glen, New York
- Course: Permanent racing facility
- Course length: 2.454 miles (3.949 km)
- Distance: 42 laps, 103 mi (165 km)
- Scheduled distance: 41 laps, 100 mi (161 km)
- Average speed: 102.932 mph (165.653 km/h)

Pole position
Driver	Corey LaJoie	Spraker Racing Enterprises
- Time: 1:13.280

Most laps led
Driver	Connor Zilisch	Pinnacle Racing Group
- Laps: 34

Winner
No. 20	Jesse Love	Venturini Motorsports

Television in the United States
- Network: FS1
- Announcers: Jamie Little, Phil Parsons, and Trevor Bayne

Radio in the United States
- Radio: MRN

The 2023 General Tire 100 at The Glen was the 13th stock car race of the 2023 ARCA Menards Series season, and the 3rd iteration of the event. The race was held on Friday, August 18, 2023, in Watkins Glen, New York at Watkins Glen International, a 2.454 mile (3.949 km) permanent road course. The race was scheduled to be contested over 41 laps, but was extended to 42 laps due to a NASCAR overtime finish. In a wild one-lap overtime restart, Jesse Love, driving for Venturini Motorsports, would make a bump-and-run move on Connor Zilisch in the final turn, and held him off to earn his 10th career ARCA Menards Series win, his eighth of the season, and his fourth in a row. Zilisch had dominated the entire race, leading a race-high 34 laps. To fill out the podium, Zilisch, driving for Pinnacle Racing Group, and Brent Crews, driving for Venturini Motorsports, would finish 2nd and 3rd, respectively.

== Background ==
Watkins Glen International (nicknamed "The Glen") is an automobile race track located in Watkins Glen, New York at the southern tip of Seneca Lake. It was long known around the world as the home of the Formula One United States Grand Prix, which it hosted for twenty consecutive years (1961–1980), but the site has been home to road racing of nearly every class, including the World Sportscar Championship, Trans-Am, Can-Am, NASCAR Cup Series, the International Motor Sports Association and the IndyCar Series.

Initially, public roads in the village were used for the race course. In 1956 a permanent circuit for the race was built. In 1968 the race was extended to six hours, becoming the 6 Hours of Watkins Glen. The circuit's current layout has more or less been the same since 1971, although a chicane was installed at the uphill Esses in 1975 to slow cars through these corners, where there was a fatality during practice at the 1973 United States Grand Prix. The chicane was removed in 1985, but another chicane called the "Inner Loop" was installed in 1992 after J.D. McDuffie's fatal accident during the previous year's NASCAR Winston Cup event.

The circuit is known as the Mecca of North American road racing and is a very popular venue among fans and drivers. The facility is currently owned by International Speedway Corporation.

=== Entry list ===
- (R) denotes rookie driver.

#	Driver	Team	Make	Sponsor
02	Parker Retzlaff	Young's Motorsports	Chevrolet	Ponsse
2	Andrés Pérez de Lara (R)	Rev Racing	Chevrolet	Max Siegel Inc.
03	A. J. Moyer (R)	Clubb Racing Inc.	Ford	Clubb Racing Inc.
4	Dale Quarterley	1/4 Ley Racing	Chevrolet	Van Dyk Recycling Solutions
06	Tim Richmond	Richmond Motorsports	Toyota	Immigration Law Center
6	Jack Wood	Rev Racing	Chevrolet	Velocity Racing
10	Ed Pompa	Fast Track Racing	Toyota	HYTORC of New York, Double "H" Ranch
11	Zach Herrin	Fast Track Racing	Toyota	Lambda Legal
12	Stanton Barrett	Fast Track Racing	Toyota	Stanton Barrett Family Wines
15	Kris Wright	Venturini Motorsports	Toyota	FNB Corporation
18	William Sawalich	Joe Gibbs Racing	Toyota	Starkey, SoundGear
20	Jesse Love	Venturini Motorsports	Toyota	JBL
25	Brent Crews	Venturini Motorsports	Toyota	Mobil 1
28	Connor Zilisch	Pinnacle Racing Group	Chevrolet	Chevrolet Performance
30	Frankie Muniz (R)	Rette Jones Racing	Ford	Ford Performance
31	Casey Carden	Rise Motorsports	Chevrolet	Reel Racing
32	Christian Rose (R)	AM Racing	Ford	West Virginia Tourism
48	Brad Smith	Brad Smith Motorsports	Chevrolet	Copraya.com
55	Jake Finch	Venturini Motorsports	Toyota	Phoenix Construction
63	Corey LaJoie	Spraker Racing Enterprises	Chevrolet	Diamond C Ranch, American Apparel
66	Jon Garrett (R)	Veer Motorsports	Chevrolet	Venture Foods
73	Andy Jankowiak	KLAS Motorsports	Chevrolet	Whelen
Official entry list

== Practice ==
The first and only practice session was held on Friday, August 18, at 3:00 PM EST, and would last for 60 minutes. Connor Zilisch, driving for Pinnacle Racing Group, would set the fastest time in the session, with a lap of 1:14.022, and an average speed of 119.154 mph (191.760 km/h).

Pos.	#	Driver	Team	Make	Time	Speed
1	28	Connor Zilisch	Pinnacle Racing Group	Chevrolet	1:14.022	119.154
2	25	Brent Crews	Venturini Motorsports	Toyota	1:14.403	118.544
3	20	Jesse Love	Venturini Motorsports	Toyota	1:14.424	118.510
Full practice results

== Qualifying ==
Qualifying was held on Friday, August 18, at 4:15 PM EST. The qualifying system used is a multi-car, multi-lap system with only one round. Whoever sets the fastest time in that round wins the pole. Corey LaJoie, driving for Spraker Racing Enterprises, would score the pole for the race, with a lap of 1:13.280, and an average speed of 120.360 mph (193.701 km/h).

Pos.	#	Driver	Team	Make	Time	Speed
1	63	Corey LaJoie	Spraker Racing Enterprises	Chevrolet	1:13.280	120.360
2	28	Connor Zilisch	Pinnacle Racing Group	Chevrolet	1:13.377	120.201
3	25	Brent Crews	Venturini Motorsports	Toyota	1:13.970	119.238
4	20	Jesse Love	Venturini Motorsports	Toyota	1:14.120	118.996
5	18	William Sawalich	Joe Gibbs Racing	Toyota	1:14.269	118.757
6	15	Kris Wright	Venturini Motorsports	Toyota	1:14.685	118.096
7	2	Andrés Pérez de Lara (R)	Rev Racing	Chevrolet	1:14.964	117.656
8	6	Jack Wood	Rev Racing	Chevrolet	1:15.254	117.203
9	4	Dale Quarterley	1/4 Ley Racing	Chevrolet	1:15.453	116.894
10	30	Frankie Muniz (R)	Rette Jones Racing	Ford	1:15.789	116.376
11	12	Stanton Barrett	Fast Track Racing	Toyota	1:16.195	115.756
12	55	Jake Finch	Venturini Motorsports	Toyota	1:16.774	114.883
13	73	Andy Jankowiak	KLAS Motorsports	Chevrolet	1:16.817	114.818
14	02	Parker Retzlaff	Young's Motorsports	Chevrolet	1:17.397	113.958
15	32	Christian Rose (R)	AM Racing	Ford	1:18.466	112.405
16	11	Zach Herrin	Fast Track Racing	Toyota	1:19.274	111.260
17	31	Casey Carden	Rise Motorsports	Chevrolet	1:21.318	108.463
18	66	Jon Garrett (R)	Veer Motorsports	Chevrolet	1:25.920	102.654
19	48	Brad Smith	Brad Smith Motorsports	Chevrolet	1:42.836	85.768
20	03	A. J. Moyer (R)	Clubb Racing Inc.	Ford	1:55.847	76.135
21	10	Ed Pompa	Fast Track Racing	Toyota	–	–
22	06	Tim Richmond	Richmond Motorsports	Toyota	–	–
Official qualifying results

== Race results ==
Fin	St	#	Driver	Team	Make	Laps	Led	Status	Pts
1	4	20	Jesse Love	Venturini Motorsports	Toyota	42	1	Running	47
2	2	28	Connor Zilisch	Pinnacle Racing Group	Chevrolet	42	34	Running	44
3	3	25	Brent Crews	Venturini Motorsports	Toyota	42	0	Running	41
4	5	18	William Sawalich	Joe Gibbs Racing	Toyota	42	0	Running	40
5	9	4	Dale Quarterley	1/4 Ley Racing	Chevrolet	42	0	Running	39
6	6	15	Kris Wright	Venturini Motorsports	Toyota	42	2	Running	39
7	13	73	Andy Jankowiak	KLAS Motorsports	Chevrolet	42	0	Running	37
8	16	11	Zach Herrin	Fast Track Racing	Toyota	42	0	Running	36
9	11	12	Stanton Barrett	Fast Track Racing	Toyota	42	0	Running	35
10	12	55	Jake Finch	Venturini Motorsports	Toyota	42	0	Running	34
11	15	32	Christian Rose (R)	AM Racing	Ford	42	0	Running	33
12	7	2	Andrés Pérez de Lara (R)	Rev Racing	Chevrolet	41	0	Accident	32
13	21	10	Ed Pompa	Fast Track Racing	Toyota	41	0	Running	31
14	8	6	Jack Wood	Rev Racing	Chevrolet	37	0	Accident	30
15	1	63	Corey LaJoie	Spraker Racing Enterprises	Chevrolet	23	5	Brakes	31
16	10	30	Frankie Muniz (R)	Rette Jones Racing	Ford	22	0	Electrical	28
17	17	31	Casey Carden	Rise Motorsports	Chevrolet	21	0	Transmission	27
18	14	02	Parker Retzlaff	Young's Motorsports	Chevrolet	11	0	Rear Gear	26
19	18	66	Jon Garrett (R)	Veer Motorsports	Chevrolet	4	0	Mechanical	25
20	19	48	Brad Smith	Brad Smith Motorsports	Chevrolet	1	0	Mechanical	24
21	20	03	A. J. Moyer (R)	Clubb Racing Inc.	Ford	0	0	Mechanical	23
22	22	06	Tim Richmond	Richmond Motorsports	Toyota	0	0	DNS	22
Official race results

== Standings after the race ==
Drivers' Championship standings

	Pos	Driver	Points
	1	Jesse Love	659
1	2	Andrés Pérez de Lara	543 (-116)
1	3	Frankie Muniz	542 (-117)
	4	Christian Rose	499 (-127)
	5	Jon Garrett	475 (-184)
	6	A. J. Moyer	421 (-238)
	7	Brad Smith	403 (-256)
	8	Toni Breidinger	376 (-283)
2	9	William Sawalich	294 (-365)
	10	Jack Wood	285 (-374)

- Note: Only the first 10 positions are included for the driver standings.

Previous race: 2023 Reese's 200	ARCA Menards Series; 2023 season	Next race: 2023 Dutch Boy 100
