= 2023 Dutch Boy 100 =

14th race of the 2023 ARCA Menards Series

Race details
- Race 14 of 20 of the 2023 ARCA Menards Series
- Date: August 20, 2023
- Official name: 41st Annual Dutch Boy 100
- Location: Illinois State Fairgrounds Racetrack, Springfield, Illinois
- Course: Permanent racing facility
- Course length: 1.6 km (1 miles)
- Distance: 100 laps, 100 mi (160 km)
- Scheduled distance: 100 laps, 100 mi (160 km)
- Average speed: 79.646 mph (128.178 km/h)

Pole position
Driver	Brent Crews	Venturini Motorsports
- Time: 35.544

Most laps led
Driver	Brent Crews	Venturini Motorsports
- Laps: 64

Winner
No. 25	Brent Crews	Venturini Motorsports

Television in the United States
- Network: FS1
- Announcers: Brent Stover and Phil Parsons

Radio in the United States
- Radio: ARCA Racing Network

The 2023 Dutch Boy 100 was the 14th stock car race of the 2023 ARCA Menards Series season, and the 41st iteration of the event. The race was held on Sunday, August 20, 2023, in Springfield, Illinois at the Illinois State Fairgrounds Racetrack, a 1-mile (1.6 km) permanent oval-shaped dirt track. The race took the scheduled 100 laps to complete. Brent Crews, driving for Venturini Motorsports, would put on a dominating performance, winning the pole and leading a race-high 64 laps, earning his first career ARCA Menards Series win, and his first of the season. Crews would also become the second-youngest driver to win in ARCA. To fill out the podium, Andrés Pérez de Lara, driving for Rev Racing, and Jesse Love, driving for Venturini Motorsports, would finish 2nd and 3rd, respectively.

== Background ==
Illinois State Fairgrounds Racetrack is a one mile long clay oval motor racetrack on the Illinois State Fairgrounds in Springfield, the state capital. It is frequently nicknamed The Springfield Mile. Constructed in the late 19th century and reconstructed in 1927, the track has hosted competitive auto racing since 1910, making it one of the oldest speedways in the United States. The original mile track utilized the current frontstretch and the other side was behind the current grandstands and the straightaways were connected by tight turns. It is the oldest track to continually host national championship dirt track racing, holding its first national championship race in 1934 under the American Automobile Association banner. It is the home of five world records for automobile racing, making it one of the fastest dirt tracks in the world. Since 1993, the venue is managed by Bob Sargent's Track Enterprises.

=== Entry list ===
- (R) denotes rookie driver.

#	Driver	Team	Make	Sponsor
2	Andrés Pérez de Lara (R)	Rev Racing	Chevrolet	Max Siegel Inc.
03	Alex Clubb	Clubb Racing Inc.	Ford	Clubb Racing Inc.
4	Dale Quarterley	1/4 Ley Racing	Chevrolet	Van Dyk Recycling Solutions
06	A. J. Moyer (R)	Wayne Peterson Racing	Toyota	River's Edge Cottages & RV Park
8	Sean Corr	Empire Racing	Ford	Miller Welders
10	Ken Schrader	Fast Track Racing	Toyota	Fast Track Racing
11	Tim Monroe	Fast Track Racing	Chevrolet	Mark Rumbold Farms, Riverside
12	Dallas Frueh	Fast Track Racing	Ford	Universal Technical Institute
15	Taylor Reimer	Venturini Motorsports	Toyota	BuzzBallz
16	Kelly Kovski	Kelly Kovski Racing	Chevrolet	BRANDT, Schluckebier Farms
18	William Sawalich	Joe Gibbs Racing	Toyota	Starkey, SoundGear
20	Jesse Love	Venturini Motorsports	Toyota	GearWrench
25	Brent Crews	Venturini Motorsports	Toyota	Mobil 1
30	Frankie Muniz (R)	Rette Jones Racing	Ford	Ford Performance
31	Brayton Laster	Rise Motorsports	Chevrolet	@Cyber_Fox_ on Twitter
32	Christian Rose (R)	AM Racing	Ford	West Virginia Tourism
48	Brad Smith	Brad Smith Motorsports	Chevrolet	Copraya.com
66	Jon Garrett (R)	Veer Motorsports	Chevrolet	NAMI of Greater Athens, Texas
Official entry list

== Practice ==
The first and only practice session was held on Sunday, August 20, at 10:00 AM CST, and would last for 30 minutes. Brent Crews, driving for Venturini Motorsports, would set the fastest time in the session, with a lap of 33.513, and an average speed of 107.421 mph (172.877 km/h).

Pos.	#	Driver	Team	Make	Time	Speed
1	25	Brent Crews	Venturini Motorsports	Toyota	33.513	107.421
2	20	Jesse Love	Venturini Motorsports	Toyota	33.601	107.140
3	18	William Sawalich	Joe Gibbs Racing	Toyota	34.045	105.742
Full practice results

== Qualifying ==
Qualifying was held on Sunday, August 20, at 11:15 AM CST. The qualifying system used is a single-car, one-lap system with only one round. Whoever sets the fastest time in that round wins the pole. Brent Crews, driving for Venturini Motorsports, would score the pole for the race, with a lap of 35.544, and an average speed of 101.283 mph (162.999 km/h).

Pos.	#	Driver	Team	Make	Time	Speed
1	25	Brent Crews	Venturini Motorsports	Toyota	35.544	101.283
2	8	Sean Corr	Empire Racing	Ford	35.613	101.087
3	18	William Sawalich	Joe Gibbs Racing	Toyota	35.687	100.877
4	20	Jesse Love	Venturini Motorsports	Toyota	35.838	100.452
5	32	Christian Rose (R)	AM Racing	Ford	35.873	100.354
6	16	Kelly Kovski	Kelly Kovski Racing	Chevrolet	35.913	100.242
7	10	Ken Schrader	Fast Track Racing	Toyota	35.971	100.081
8	66	Jon Garrett (R)	Veer Motorsports	Chevrolet	36.155	99.571
9	15	Taylor Reimer	Venturini Motorsports	Toyota	36.170	99.530
10	4	Dale Quarterley	1/4 Ley Racing	Chevrolet	36.333	99.083
11	30	Frankie Muniz (R)	Rette Jones Racing	Ford	36.380	98.955
12	2	Andrés Pérez de Lara (R)	Rev Racing	Chevrolet	36.413	98.866
13	31	Brayton Laster	Rise Motorsports	Chevrolet	37.129	96.959
14	11	Tim Monroe	Fast Track Racing	Chevrolet	37.980	94.787
15	48	Brad Smith	Brad Smith Motorsports	Chevrolet	38.259	94.096
16	06	A. J. Moyer (R)	Wayne Peterson Racing	Toyota	40.809	88.216
17	03	Alex Clubb	Clubb Racing Inc.	Ford	43.291	83.158
18	12	Dallas Frueh	Fast Track Racing	Ford	–	–
Official qualifying results

== Race results ==
Fin	St	#	Driver	Team	Make	Laps	Led	Status	Pts
1	1	25	Brent Crews	Venturini Motorsports	Toyota	100	64	Running	49
2	12	2	Andrés Pérez de Lara (R)	Rev Racing	Chevrolet	100	0	Running	42
3	4	20	Jesse Love	Venturini Motorsports	Toyota	100	36	Running	42
4	6	16	Kelly Kovski	Kelly Kovski Racing	Chevrolet	100	0	Running	40
5	3	18	William Sawalich	Joe Gibbs Racing	Toyota	100	0	Running	39
6	7	10	Ken Schrader	Fast Track Racing	Toyota	99	0	Running	38
7	11	30	Frankie Muniz (R)	Rette Jones Racing	Ford	99	0	Running	37
8	9	15	Taylor Reimer	Venturini Motorsports	Toyota	98	0	Running	36
9	8	66	Jon Garrett (R)	Veer Motorsports	Chevrolet	81	0	Mechanical	35
10	13	31	Brayton Laster	Rise Motorsports	Chevrolet	68	0	Running	34
11	10	4	Dale Quarterley	1/4 Ley Racing	Chevrolet	63	0	Accident	33
12	5	32	Christian Rose (R)	AM Racing	Ford	55	0	Overheating	32
13	2	8	Sean Corr	Empire Racing	Ford	31	0	Mechanical	31
14	14	11	Tim Monroe	Fast Track Racing	Chevrolet	15	0	Mechanical	30
15	17	03	Alex Clubb	Clubb Racing Inc.	Ford	14	0	Running	29
16	16	06	A. J. Moyer (R)	Wayne Peterson Racing	Toyota	11	0	Handling	28
17	18	12	Dallas Frueh	Fast Track Racing	Ford	9	0	Mechanical	27
18	15	48	Brad Smith	Brad Smith Motorsports	Chevrolet	9	0	Overheating	26
Official race results

== Standings after the race ==
Drivers' Championship standings

Pos	Driver	Points
1	Jesse Love	701
2	Andrés Pérez de Lara	585 (-116)
3	Frankie Muniz	579 (-122)
4	Christian Rose	534 (-137)
5	Jon Garrett	510 (-191)
6	A. J. Moyer	449 (-252)
7	Brad Smith	429 (-272)
8	Toni Breidinger	376 (-325)
9	William Sawalich	333 (-368)
10	Jack Wood	285 (-416)

- Note: Only the first 10 positions are included for the driver standings.

Previous race: 2023 General Tire 100 at The Glen	ARCA Menards Series; 2023 season	Next race: 2023 Sprecher 150
