= 2025 Slim Jim 200 =

24th race of the 2025 NASCAR Craftsman Truck Series

Race details
- Race 24 of 25 in the 2025 NASCAR Craftsman Truck Series
- Date: October 24, 2025
- Location: Martinsville Speedway in Ridgeway, Virginia
- Course: Permanent racing facility
- Course length: 0.526 miles (0.847 km)
- Distance: 203 laps, 106.7 mi (171.8 km)
- Scheduled distance: 200 laps, 105.2 mi (169.3 km)
- Average speed: 58.340 mph (93.889 km/h)

Pole position
Driver	Layne Riggs	Front Row Motorsports
- Time: 19.478

Most laps led
Driver	Corey Heim	Tricon Garage
- Laps: 77

Fastest lap
Driver	Layne Riggs	Front Row Motorsports
- Time: 20.002

Winner
No. 11	Corey Heim	Tricon Garage

Television in the United States
- Network: FS1
- Announcers: Jamie Little, Brad Keselowski, and Regan Smith

Radio in the United States
- Radio: NRN

The 2025 Slim Jim 200 was the 24th stock car race of the 2025 NASCAR Craftsman Truck Series, the final race of the Round of 8, and the 21st iteration of the event. The race was held on Friday, October 24, 2025, at Martinsville Speedway in Ridgeway, Virginia, a 0.526 miles (0.847 km) paperclip-shaped short track. The race was contested over 203 laps, extended from 200 laps due to a green-white-checkered finish.

In a wild and caution-filled final stage, Corey Heim, driving for Tricon Garage, would continue his season-long dominance, winning both stages and leading a race-high 77 laps after starting fourth to earn his 22nd career NASCAR Craftsman Truck Series win, and his record 11th of the season. To fill out the podium, Kaden Honeycutt, driving for Halmar Friesen Racing, and Layne Riggs, driving for Front Row Motorsports, would finish 2nd and 3rd, respectively.

The race would produce one of the most dramatic elimination events in history, as positions 2-5 were separated by only one point at race's end. Kaden Honeycutt and Layne Riggs tied for the final spot, with Honeycutt winning the tiebreaker due to his second-place finish. The rest of the Championship 4 lineup was set, which will be Heim, Ty Majeski, Tyler Ankrum, and Honeycutt.

Following the race, Toyota clinched their 14th manufacturer's championship.

== Report ==
=== Background ===
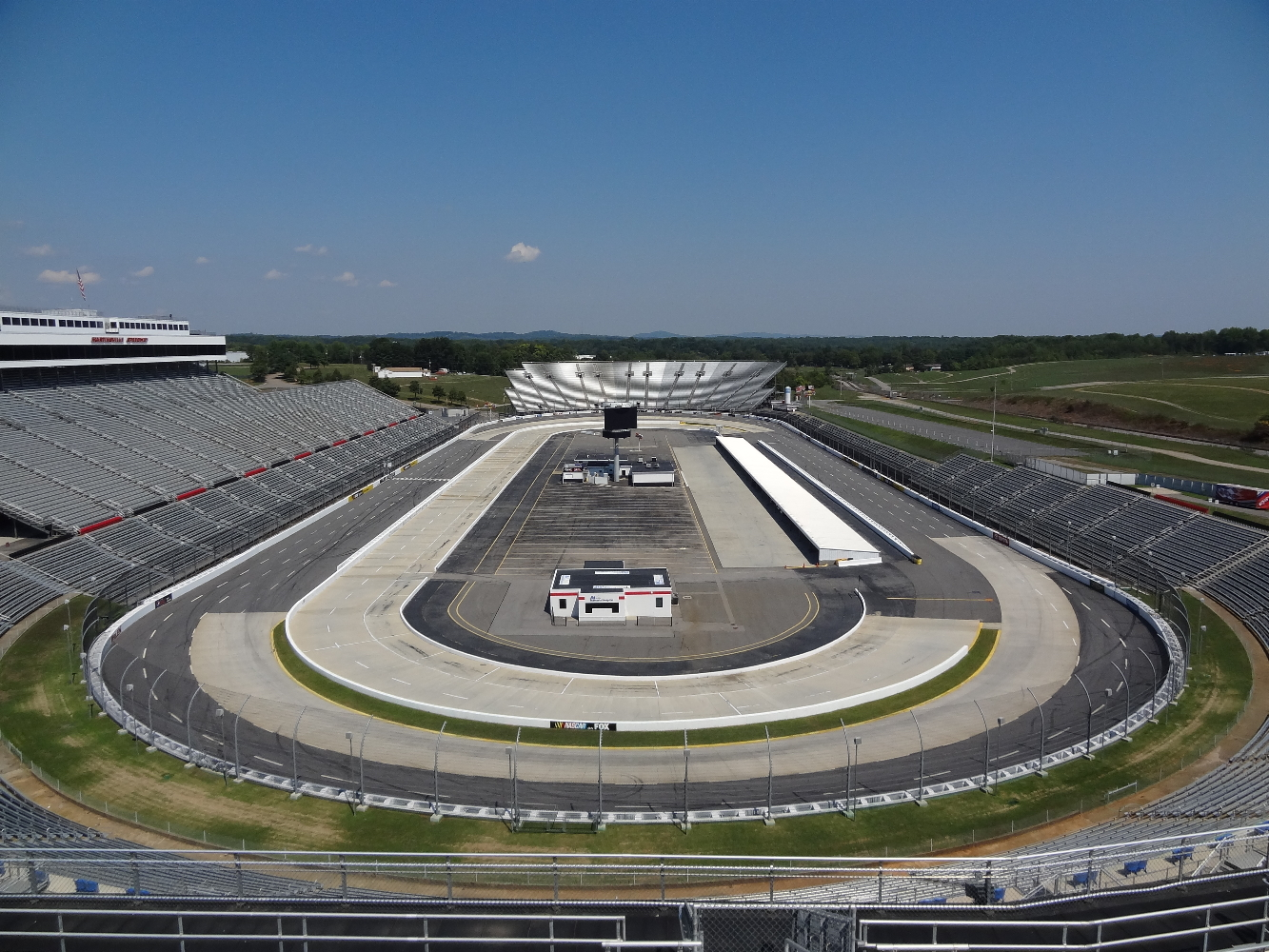
Martinsville Speedway, the track where the race was held.

Martinsville Speedway is a NASCAR-owned stock car racing track located in Henry County, in Ridgeway, Virginia, just to the south of Martinsville. At 0.526 miles (0.847 km) in length, it is the shortest track in the NASCAR Cup Series. The track was also one of the first paved oval tracks in NASCAR, being built in 1947 by H. Clay Earles. It is also the only remaining race track on the NASCAR circuit since its beginning in 1948.

=== Entry list ===
- (R) denotes rookie driver.
- (P) denotes playoff driver.
- (i) denotes driver who is ineligible for series driver points.

#	Driver	Team	Make
1	Brent Crews	Tricon Garage	Toyota
02	Logan Bearden (i)	Young's Motorsports	Chevrolet
2	Clayton Green	Reaume Brothers Racing	Ford
5	Toni Breidinger (R)	Tricon Garage	Toyota
6	Norm Benning	Norm Benning Racing	Chevrolet
7	Brenden Queen (i)	Spire Motorsports	Chevrolet
9	Grant Enfinger (P)	CR7 Motorsports	Chevrolet
11	Corey Heim (P)	Tricon Garage	Toyota
13	Jake Garcia	ThorSport Racing	Ford
15	Tanner Gray	Tricon Garage	Toyota
17	Gio Ruggiero (R)	Tricon Garage	Toyota
18	Tyler Ankrum (P)	McAnally–Hilgemann Racing	Chevrolet
19	Daniel Hemric (P)	McAnally–Hilgemann Racing	Chevrolet
22	A. J. Waller	Reaume Brothers Racing	Ford
26	Dawson Sutton (R)	Rackley W.A.R.	Chevrolet
33	Frankie Muniz (R)	Reaume Brothers Racing	Ford
34	Layne Riggs (P)	Front Row Motorsports	Ford
38	Chandler Smith	Front Row Motorsports	Ford
41	Conner Jones	Niece Motorsports	Chevrolet
42	Matt Mills	Niece Motorsports	Chevrolet
44	Andrés Pérez de Lara (R)	Niece Motorsports	Chevrolet
45	Bayley Currey	Niece Motorsports	Chevrolet
52	Kaden Honeycutt (P)	Halmar Friesen Racing	Toyota
56	Timmy Hill	Hill Motorsports	Toyota
69	Casey Mears	MBM Motorsports	Ford
71	Rajah Caruth (P)	Spire Motorsports	Chevrolet
76	Spencer Boyd	Freedom Racing Enterprises	Chevrolet
77	Corey LaJoie	Spire Motorsports	Chevrolet
81	Connor Mosack (R)	McAnally–Hilgemann Racing	Chevrolet
84	Patrick Staropoli (i)	Cook Racing Technologies	Toyota
88	Matt Crafton	ThorSport Racing	Ford
90	Justin Carroll	TC Motorsports	Toyota
91	Jack Wood	McAnally–Hilgemann Racing	Chevrolet
98	Ty Majeski (P)	ThorSport Racing	Ford
99	Ben Rhodes	ThorSport Racing	Ford
Official entry list

== Practice ==
For practice, drivers were separated into two groups, A and B. Both sessions were 25 minutes long, and was held on Friday, October 24, at 2:05 PM EST. Layne Riggs, driving for Front Row Motorsports, would set the fastest time between both groups, with a lap of 20.102, and a speed of 94.200 mph (151.600 km/h).

Pos.	#	Driver	Team	Make	Time	Speed
1	34	Layne Riggs (P)	Front Row Motorsports	Ford	20.102	94.200
2	99	Ben Rhodes	ThorSport Racing	Ford	20.175	93.859
3	88	Matt Crafton	ThorSport Racing	Ford	20.186	93.808
Full practice results

== Qualifying ==
Qualifying was held on Friday, October 24, at 3:10 PM EST. Since Martinsville Speedway is a short track, the qualifying procedure used is a single-car, two-lap system with one round. Drivers will be on track by themselves and will have two laps to post a qualifying time, and whoever sets the fastest time will win the pole.

Layne Riggs, driving for Front Row Motorsports, would score the pole for the race, with a lap of 19.478, and a speed of 97.217 mph (156.456 km/h).

No drivers would fail to qualify.

=== Qualifying results ===
Pos.	#	Driver	Team	Make	Time	Speed
1	34	Layne Riggs (P)	Front Row Motorsports	Ford	19.478	97.217
2	17	Gio Ruggiero (R)	Tricon Garage	Toyota	19.509	97.063
3	98	Ty Majeski (P)	ThorSport Racing	Ford	19.512	97.048
4	11	Corey Heim (P)	Tricon Garage	Toyota	19.534	96.939
5	52	Kaden Honeycutt (P)	Halmar Friesen Racing	Toyota	19.625	96.489
6	18	Tyler Ankrum (P)	McAnally–Hilgemann Racing	Chevrolet	19.637	96.430
7	71	Rajah Caruth (P)	Spire Motorsports	Chevrolet	19.640	96.415
8	9	Grant Enfinger (P)	CR7 Motorsports	Chevrolet	19.656	96.337
9	19	Daniel Hemric (P)	McAnally–Hilgemann Racing	Chevrolet	19.685	96.195
10	44	Andrés Pérez de Lara (R)	Niece Motorsports	Chevrolet	19.686	96.190
11	99	Ben Rhodes	ThorSport Racing	Ford	19.688	96.180
12	15	Tanner Gray	Tricon Garage	Toyota	19.697	96.136
13	7	Brenden Queen (i)	Spire Motorsports	Chevrolet	19.717	96.039
14	26	Dawson Sutton (R)	Rackley W.A.R.	Chevrolet	19.727	95.990
15	88	Matt Crafton	ThorSport Racing	Ford	19.731	95.971
16	77	Corey LaJoie	Spire Motorsports	Chevrolet	19.752	95.869
17	81	Connor Mosack (R)	McAnally–Hilgemann Racing	Chevrolet	19.764	95.811
18	38	Chandler Smith	Front Row Motorsports	Ford	19.800	95.636
19	91	Jack Wood	McAnally–Hilgemann Racing	Chevrolet	19.807	95.603
20	45	Bayley Currey	Niece Motorsports	Chevrolet	19.819	95.545
21	1	Brent Crews	Tricon Garage	Toyota	19.829	95.496
22	13	Jake Garcia	ThorSport Racing	Ford	19.846	95.415
23	42	Matt Mills	Niece Motorsports	Chevrolet	19.884	95.232
24	5	Toni Breidinger (R)	Tricon Garage	Toyota	19.907	95.122
25	41	Conner Jones	Niece Motorsports	Chevrolet	19.930	95.013
26	56	Timmy Hill	Hill Motorsports	Toyota	20.024	94.567
27	69	Casey Mears	MBM Motorsports	Ford	20.059	94.402
28	76	Spencer Boyd	Freedom Racing Enterprises	Chevrolet	20.060	94.397
29	84	Patrick Staropoli (i)	Cook Racing Technologies	Toyota	20.137	94.036
30	02	Logan Bearden (i)	Young's Motorsports	Chevrolet	20.181	93.831
31	90	Justin Carroll	TC Motorsports	Toyota	20.545	92.168
Qualified by owner's points
32	33	Frankie Muniz (R)	Reaume Brothers Racing	Ford	20.826	90.925
33	22	A. J. Waller	Reaume Brothers Racing	Ford	21.072	89.863
34	6	Norm Benning	Norm Benning Racing	Chevrolet	21.318	88.826
35	2	Clayton Green	Reaume Brothers Racing	Ford	–	–
Official qualifying results
Official starting lineup

== Race results ==
Stage 1 Laps: 50

Pos.	#	Driver	Team	Make	Pts
1	11	Corey Heim (P)	Tricon Garage	Toyota	10
2	98	Ty Majeski (P)	ThorSport Racing	Chevrolet	9
3	9	Grant Enfinger (P)	CR7 Motorsports	Chevrolet	8
4	18	Tyler Ankrum (P)	McAnally-Hilgemann Racing	Chevrolet	7
5	15	Tanner Gray	Tricon Garage	Toyota	6
6	34	Layne Riggs (P)	Front Row Motorsports	Ford	5
7	52	Kaden Honeycutt (P)	Halmar Friesen Racing	Toyota	4
8	17	Gio Ruggiero (R)	Tricon Garage	Toyota	3
9	71	Rajah Caruth (P)	Spire Motorsports	Chevrolet	2
10	1	Brent Crews	Tricon Garage	Toyota	1

Stage 2 Laps: 50

Pos.	#	Driver	Team	Make	Pts
1	11	Corey Heim (P)	Tricon Garage	Toyota	10
2	98	Ty Majeski (P)	ThorSport Racing	Chevrolet	9
3	34	Layne Riggs (P)	Front Row Motorsports	Ford	8
4	9	Grant Enfinger (P)	CR7 Motorsports	Chevrolet	7
5	15	Tanner Gray	Tricon Garage	Toyota	6
6	18	Tyler Ankrum (P)	McAnally-Hilgemann Racing	Chevrolet	5
7	1	Brent Crews	Tricon Garage	Toyota	4
8	52	Kaden Honeycutt (P)	Halmar Friesen Racing	Toyota	3
9	41	Conner Jones	Niece Motorsports	Chevrolet	2
10	99	Ben Rhodes	ThorSport Racing	Ford	1

Stage 3 Laps: 103

Fin	St	#	Driver	Team	Make	Laps	Led	Status	Pts
1	4	11	Corey Heim (P)	Tricon Garage	Toyota	203	77	Running	60
2	5	52	Kaden Honeycutt (P)	Halmar Friesen Racing	Toyota	203	0	Running	42
3	1	34	Layne Riggs (P)	Front Row Motorsports	Ford	203	27	Running	48
4	21	1	Brent Crews	Tricon Garage	Toyota	203	53	Running	38
5	16	77	Corey LaJoie	Spire Motorsports	Chevrolet	203	0	Running	32
6	18	38	Chandler Smith	Front Row Motorsports	Ford	203	1	Running	31
7	3	98	Ty Majeski (P)	ThorSport Racing	Ford	203	20	Running	48
8	12	15	Tanner Gray	Tricon Garage	Toyota	203	0	Running	41
9	6	18	Tyler Ankrum (P)	McAnally–Hilgemann Racing	Chevrolet	203	0	Running	40
10	13	7	Brenden Queen (i)	Spire Motorsports	Chevrolet	203	0	Running	0
11	2	17	Gio Ruggiero (R)	Tricon Garage	Toyota	203	25	Running	29
12	8	9	Grant Enfinger (P)	CR7 Motorsports	Chevrolet	203	0	Running	40
13	19	91	Jack Wood	McAnally–Hilgemann Racing	Chevrolet	203	0	Running	24
14	11	99	Ben Rhodes	ThorSport Racing	Ford	203	0	Running	24
15	29	84	Patrick Staropoli (i)	Cook Racing Technologies	Toyota	203	0	Running	0
16	26	56	Timmy Hill	Hill Motorsports	Toyota	203	0	Running	21
17	28	76	Spencer Boyd	Freedom Racing Enterprises	Chevrolet	203	0	Running	20
18	22	13	Jake Garcia	ThorSport Racing	Ford	203	0	Running	19
19	14	26	Dawson Sutton (R)	Rackley W.A.R.	Chevrolet	203	0	Running	18
20	31	90	Justin Carroll	TC Motorsports	Toyota	203	0	Running	17
21	20	45	Bayley Currey	Niece Motorsports	Chevrolet	203	0	Running	16
22	25	41	Conner Jones	Niece Motorsports	Chevrolet	203	0	Running	17
23	32	33	Frankie Muniz (R)	Reaume Brothers Racing	Ford	203	0	Running	14
24	27	69	Casey Mears	MBM Motorsports	Ford	201	0	Running	13
25	30	02	Logan Bearden (i)	Young's Motorsports	Chevrolet	197	0	Running	0
26	24	5	Toni Breidinger (R)	Tricon Garage	Toyota	196	0	Running	11
27	23	42	Matt Mills	Niece Motorsports	Chevrolet	194	0	Running	10
28	10	44	Andrés Pérez de Lara (R)	Niece Motorsports	Chevrolet	189	0	Running	9
29	15	88	Matt Crafton	ThorSport Racing	Ford	180	0	Brakes	8
30	17	81	Connor Mosack (R)	McAnally–Hilgemann Racing	Chevrolet	179	0	Accident	7
31	9	19	Daniel Hemric (P)	McAnally–Hilgemann Racing	Chevrolet	163	0	Engine	6
32	33	22	A. J. Waller	Reaume Brothers Racing	Ford	136	0	Accident	5
33	34	6	Norm Benning	Norm Benning Racing	Chevrolet	114	0	Too Slow	4
34	7	71	Rajah Caruth (P)	Spire Motorsports	Chevrolet	72	0	Accident	5
35	35	2	Clayton Green	Reaume Brothers Racing	Ford	0	0	Electrical	2
Official race results

== Standings after the race ==
Drivers' Championship standings

	Pos	Driver	Points
	1	Corey Heim	4,000
2	2	Kaden Honeycutt	4,000 (–0)
2	3	Ty Majeski	4,000 (–0)
1	4	Tyler Ankrum	4,000 (–0)
1	5	Layne Riggs	2,260 (–1,740)
4	6	Rajah Caruth	2,192 (–1,808)
1	7	Grant Enfinger	2,185 (–1,815)
1	8	Daniel Hemric	2,173 (–1,827)
	9	Chandler Smith	2,150 (–1,850)
	10	Jake Garcia	2,112 (–1,888)
Official driver's standings

Manufacturers' Championship standings

Pos	Manufacturer	Points
1	Toyota	885
2	Chevrolet	845 (–40)
3	Ford	830 (–55)

- Note: Only the first 10 positions are included for the driver standings.

Previous race: 2025 Love's RV Stop 225	NASCAR Craftsman Truck Series; 2025 season	Next race: 2025 NASCAR Craftsman Truck Series Championship Race
