= 2025 Window World 250 =

10th race of the 2025 NASCAR Craftsman Truck Series

Race details
- Race 10 of 25 of the 2025 NASCAR Craftsman Truck Series
- Date: May 17, 2025
- Location: North Wilkesboro Speedway in North Wilkesboro, North Carolina
- Course: Permanent racing facility
- Course length: 0.625 miles (1.006 km)
- Distance: 255 laps, 159 mi (256 km)
- Scheduled distance: 250 laps, 156 mi (251 km)
- Average speed: 90.597 mph (145.802 km/h)

Pole position
Driver	Corey Heim	Tricon Garage
- Grid positions set by competition-based formula

Most laps led
Driver	Corey Heim	Tricon Garage
- Laps: 162

Winner
No. 38	Chandler Smith	Front Row Motorsports

Television in the United States
- Network: FS1
- Announcers: Jamie Little, Ryan Blaney, and Michael Waltrip

Radio in the United States
- Radio: NRN

The 2025 Window World 250 was the 10th stock car race of the 2025 NASCAR Craftsman Truck Series, and the 3rd iteration of the event. The race was held on Saturday, May 17, 2025, at North Wilkesboro Speedway in North Wilkesboro, North Carolina, a 0.625 miles (1.006 km) permanent asphalt oval shaped short track. The race was contested over 255 laps, extended from 250 laps due to a green-white-checkered finish.

In a wild and controversial finish, Chandler Smith, driving for Front Row Motorsports, would steal the win on the final lap after Corey Heim and Layne Riggs made contact in turn two, causing Heim to spin. Smith held off his teammate until the caution came out, giving Smith his seventh career NASCAR Craftsman Truck Series win, and his second of the season. Prior to the restart, Heim showed another dominating performance in the Truck Series, leading 162 of the 255 laps ran. After the race, Heim confronted Riggs on pit road and showed his displeasure with the move. To fill out the podium, Tyler Ankrum, driving for McAnally-Hilgemann Racing, would finish in 3rd, respectively.

== Report ==
=== Background ===
North Wilkesboro Speedway, the track where the race was held.

North Wilkesboro Speedway is a 0.625 miles (1.006 km) paved oval short track in North Wilkesboro, North Carolina. The track has hosted a variety of racing events since its inaugural season of racing in 1947; primarily races sanctioned by NASCAR. It has been owned by Speedway Motorsports, LLC (SMI) since 2007 with Ronald Queen serving as director of operations. North Wilkesboro Speedway is served by U.S. Route 421.

The track has a capacity of 25,000 as of 2023, down from its peak of 60,000 in 1996. NWS retains a vintage aesthetic from the 1990s as part of an effort to preserve the historical value of the track. As a result, the facility retains some of its original buildings built before the track's first closure in 1996, including buildings featuring Winston Cigarettes sponsorship and suites built in the 1980s. Developers in recent years have also added other amenities as part of a revival effort that started in 2022.

==== Entry list ====
- (R) denotes rookie driver.
- (i) denotes driver who is ineligible for series driver points.

#	Driver	Team	Make
1	Brent Crews	Tricon Garage	Toyota
02	Jayson Alexander	Young's Motorsports	Chevrolet
2	Derek White	Reaume Brothers Racing	Ford
5	Toni Breidinger (R)	Tricon Garage	Toyota
6	Norm Benning	Norm Benning Racing	Chevrolet
07	Kyle Busch (i)	Spire Motorsports	Chevrolet
7	Sammy Smith (i)	Spire Motorsports	Chevrolet
9	Grant Enfinger	CR7 Motorsports	Chevrolet
11	Corey Heim	Tricon Garage	Toyota
13	Jake Garcia	ThorSport Racing	Ford
15	Tanner Gray	Tricon Garage	Toyota
17	Gio Ruggiero (R)	Tricon Garage	Toyota
18	Tyler Ankrum	McAnally-Hilgemann Racing	Chevrolet
19	Daniel Hemric	McAnally-Hilgemann Racing	Chevrolet
22	Tyler Tomassi (i)	Reaume Brothers Racing	Ford
26	Dawson Sutton (R)	Rackley W.A.R.	Chevrolet
33	Frankie Muniz (R)	Reaume Brothers Racing	Ford
34	Layne Riggs	Front Row Motorsports	Ford
38	Chandler Smith	Front Row Motorsports	Ford
42	Matt Mills	Niece Motorsports	Chevrolet
44	Conner Jones	Niece Motorsports	Chevrolet
45	Kaden Honeycutt	Niece Motorsports	Chevrolet
52	Stewart Friesen	Halmar Friesen Racing	Toyota
66	Luke Baldwin	ThorSport Racing	Ford
67	Ryan Roulette	Freedom Racing Enterprises	Chevrolet
71	Rajah Caruth	Spire Motorsports	Chevrolet
75	Patrick Emerling	Henderson Motorsports	Chevrolet
76	Spencer Boyd	Freedom Racing Enterprises	Chevrolet
77	Andrés Pérez de Lara (R)	Spire Motorsports	Chevrolet
81	Connor Mosack (R)	McAnally-Hilgemann Racing	Chevrolet
88	Matt Crafton	ThorSport Racing	Ford
91	Jack Wood	McAnally-Hilgemann Racing	Chevrolet
98	Ty Majeski	ThorSport Racing	Ford
99	Ben Rhodes	ThorSport Racing	Ford
Official entry list

== Practice ==
Practice was originally scheduled to be held on Saturday, May 17, at 9:35 AM EST, with two 25-minute group sessions, but was postponed until 10:40 AM due to inclement weather. Because of this, only one session was run, and lasted for 45 minutes. Chandler Smith, driving for Front Row Motorsports, would set the fastest time in the session, with a lap of 18.439, and a speed of 122.024 mph (196.379 km/h).

Pos.	#	Driver	Team	Make	Time	Speed
1	38	Chandler Smith	Front Row Motorsports	Ford	18.439	122.024
2	11	Corey Heim	Tricon Garage	Toyota	18.542	121.346
3	34	Layne Riggs	Front Row Motorsports	Ford	18.571	121.157
Full practice results

== Starting lineup ==
Qualifying was originally scheduled to be held on Saturday, May 17, at 10:35 AM EST, but was cancelled due to inclement weather. The starting lineup would be determined by the performance metric system. As a result, Corey Heim, driving for Tricon Garage, will start on the pole.

No drivers would fail to qualify.

=== Starting lineup ===
Pos.	#	Driver	Team	Make
1	11	Corey Heim	Tricon Garage	Toyota
2	07	Kyle Busch (i)	Spire Motorsports	Chevrolet
3	7	Sammy Smith (i)	Spire Motorsports	Chevrolet
4	17	Gio Ruggiero (R)	Tricon Garage	Toyota
5	13	Jake Garcia	ThorSport Racing	Ford
6	52	Stewart Friesen	Halmar Friesen Racing	Toyota
7	19	Daniel Hemric	McAnally-Hilgemann Racing	Chevrolet
8	9	Grant Enfinger	CR7 Motorsports	Chevrolet
9	45	Kaden Honeycutt	Niece Motorsports	Chevrolet
10	1	Brent Crews	Tricon Garage	Toyota
11	99	Ben Rhodes	ThorSport Racing	Ford
12	98	Ty Majeski	ThorSport Racing	Ford
13	18	Tyler Ankrum	McAnally-Hilgemann Racing	Chevrolet
14	38	Chandler Smith	Front Row Motorsports	Ford
15	88	Matt Crafton	ThorSport Racing	Ford
16	42	Matt Mills	Niece Motorsports	Chevrolet
17	26	Dawson Sutton (R)	Rackley W.A.R.	Chevrolet
18	71	Rajah Caruth	Spire Motorsports	Chevrolet
19	81	Connor Mosack (R)	McAnally-Hilgemann Racing	Chevrolet
20	77	Andrés Pérez de Lara (R)	Spire Motorsports	Chevrolet
21	5	Toni Breidinger (R)	Tricon Garage	Toyota
22	91	Jack Wood	McAnally-Hilgemann Racing	Chevrolet
23	44	Conner Jones	Niece Motorsports	Chevrolet
24	15	Tanner Gray	Tricon Garage	Toyota
25	76	Spencer Boyd	Freedom Racing Enterprises	Chevrolet
26	2	Derek White	Reaume Brothers Racing	Ford
27	34	Layne Riggs	Front Row Motorsports	Ford
28	22	Tyler Tomassi (i)	Reaume Brothers Racing	Ford
29	33	Frankie Muniz (R)	Reaume Brothers Racing	Ford
30	66	Luke Baldwin	ThorSport Racing	Ford
31	02	Jayson Alexander	Young's Motorsports	Chevrolet
32	75	Patrick Emerling	Henderson Motorsports	Chevrolet
33	6	Norm Benning	Norm Benning Racing	Chevrolet
34	67	Ryan Roulette	Freedom Racing Enterprises	Chevrolet
Official starting lineup

== Race results ==
Stage 1 Laps: 70

Pos.	#	Driver	Team	Make	Pts
1	17	Gio Ruggiero (R)	Tricon Garage	Toyota	10
2	11	Corey Heim	Tricon Garage	Toyota	9
3	52	Stewart Friesen	Halmar Friesen Racing	Toyota	8
4	13	Jake Garcia	ThorSport Racing	Ford	7
5	38	Chandler Smith	Front Row Motorsports	Ford	6
6	34	Layne Riggs	Front Row Motorsports	Ford	5
7	18	Tyler Ankrum	McAnally-Hilgemann Racing	Chevrolet	4
8	19	Daniel Hemric	McAnally-Hilgemann Racing	Chevrolet	3
9	9	Grant Enfinger	CR7 Motorsports	Chevrolet	2
10	07	Kyle Busch (i)	Spire Motorsports	Chevrolet	0

Stage 2 Laps: 70

Pos.	#	Driver	Team	Make	Pts
1	9	Grant Enfinger	CR7 Motorsports	Chevrolet	10
2	11	Corey Heim	Tricon Garage	Toyota	9
3	38	Chandler Smith	Front Row Motorsports	Ford	8
4	18	Tyler Ankrum	McAnally-Hilgemann Racing	Chevrolet	7
5	34	Layne Riggs	Front Row Motorsports	Ford	6
6	07	Kyle Busch (i)	Spire Motorsports	Chevrolet	0
7	71	Rajah Caruth	Spire Motorsports	Chevrolet	4
8	1	Brent Crews	Tricon Garage	Toyota	3
9	99	Ben Rhodes	ThorSport Racing	Ford	2
10	7	Sammy Smith (i)	Spire Motorsports	Chevrolet	0

Stage 3 Laps: 115

Fin	St	#	Driver	Team	Make	Laps	Led	Status	Pts
1	14	38	Chandler Smith	Front Row Motorsports	Ford	255	1	Running	55
2	27	34	Layne Riggs	Front Row Motorsports	Ford	255	0	Running	46
3	13	18	Tyler Ankrum	McAnally-Hilgemann Racing	Chevrolet	255	0	Running	45
4	7	19	Daniel Hemric	McAnally-Hilgemann Racing	Chevrolet	255	0	Running	36
5	8	9	Grant Enfinger	CR7 Motorsports	Chevrolet	255	68	Running	44
6	12	98	Ty Majeski	ThorSport Racing	Ford	255	0	Running	31
7	4	17	Gio Ruggiero (R)	Tricon Garage	Toyota	255	24	Running	40
8	9	45	Kaden Honeycutt	Niece Motorsports	Chevrolet	255	0	Running	29
9	2	07	Kyle Busch (i)	Spire Motorsports	Chevrolet	255	0	Running	0
10	3	7	Sammy Smith (i)	Spire Motorsports	Chevrolet	255	0	Running	0
11	24	15	Tanner Gray	Tricon Garage	Toyota	255	0	Running	26
12	5	13	Jake Garcia	ThorSport Racing	Ford	255	0	Running	32
13	30	66	Luke Baldwin	ThorSport Racing	Ford	255	0	Running	24
14	6	52	Stewart Friesen	Halmar Friesen Racing	Toyota	255	0	Running	31
15	18	71	Rajah Caruth	Spire Motorsports	Chevrolet	255	0	Running	26
16	19	81	Connor Mosack (R)	McAnally-Hilgemann Racing	Chevrolet	255	0	Running	21
17	1	11	Corey Heim	Tricon Garage	Toyota	255	162	Running	38
18	15	88	Matt Crafton	ThorSport Racing	Ford	254	0	Running	19
19	32	75	Patrick Emerling	Henderson Motorsports	Chevrolet	254	0	Running	18
20	22	91	Jack Wood	McAnally-Hilgemann Racing	Chevrolet	254	0	Running	17
21	21	5	Toni Breidinger (R)	Tricon Garage	Toyota	254	0	Running	16
22	10	1	Brent Crews	Tricon Garage	Toyota	254	0	Running	18
23	11	99	Ben Rhodes	ThorSport Racing	Ford	254	0	Running	16
24	20	77	Andrés Pérez de Lara (R)	Spire Motorsports	Chevrolet	253	0	Running	13
25	16	42	Matt Mills	Niece Motorsports	Chevrolet	253	0	Running	12
26	17	26	Dawson Sutton (R)	Rackley W.A.R.	Chevrolet	253	0	Running	11
27	23	44	Conner Jones	Niece Motorsports	Chevrolet	251	0	Running	10
28	25	76	Spencer Boyd	Freedom Racing Enterprises	Chevrolet	251	0	Running	9
29	29	33	Frankie Muniz (R)	Reaume Brothers Racing	Ford	248	0	Running	8
30	31	02	Jayson Alexander	Young's Motorsports	Chevrolet	242	0	Running	7
31	28	22	Tyler Tomassi (i)	Reaume Brothers Racing	Ford	209	0	Suspension	0
32	34	67	Ryan Roulette	Freedom Racing Enterprises	Chevrolet	153	0	Brakes	5
33	26	2	Derek White	Reaume Brothers Racing	Ford	96	0	Too Slow	4
34	33	6	Norm Benning	Norm Benning Racing	Chevrolet	62	0	Vibration	3
Official race results

== Standings after the race ==
Drivers' Championship standings

	Pos	Driver	Points
	1	Corey Heim	450
	2	Chandler Smith	403 (-47)
	3	Daniel Hemric	363 (–87)
	4	Tyler Ankrum	357 (–93)
	5	Grant Enfinger	339 (–111)
	6	Ty Majeski	316 (–134)
	7	Jake Garcia	306 (–144)
1	8	Layne Riggs	294 (–156)
1	9	Kaden Honeycutt	285 (–165)
1	10	Stewart Friesen	267 (–183)
Official driver's standings

Manufacturers' Championship standings

Pos	Manufacturer	Points
1	Chevrolet	338
2	Toyota	317 (-21)
3	Ford	304 (–34)

- Note: Only the first 10 positions are included for the driver standings.

Previous race: 2025 Heart of Health Care 200	NASCAR Craftsman Truck Series; 2025 season	Next race: 2025 North Carolina Education Lottery 200
