= Sam Hunt (racing driver) =

American racing driver and team owner (born 1993)

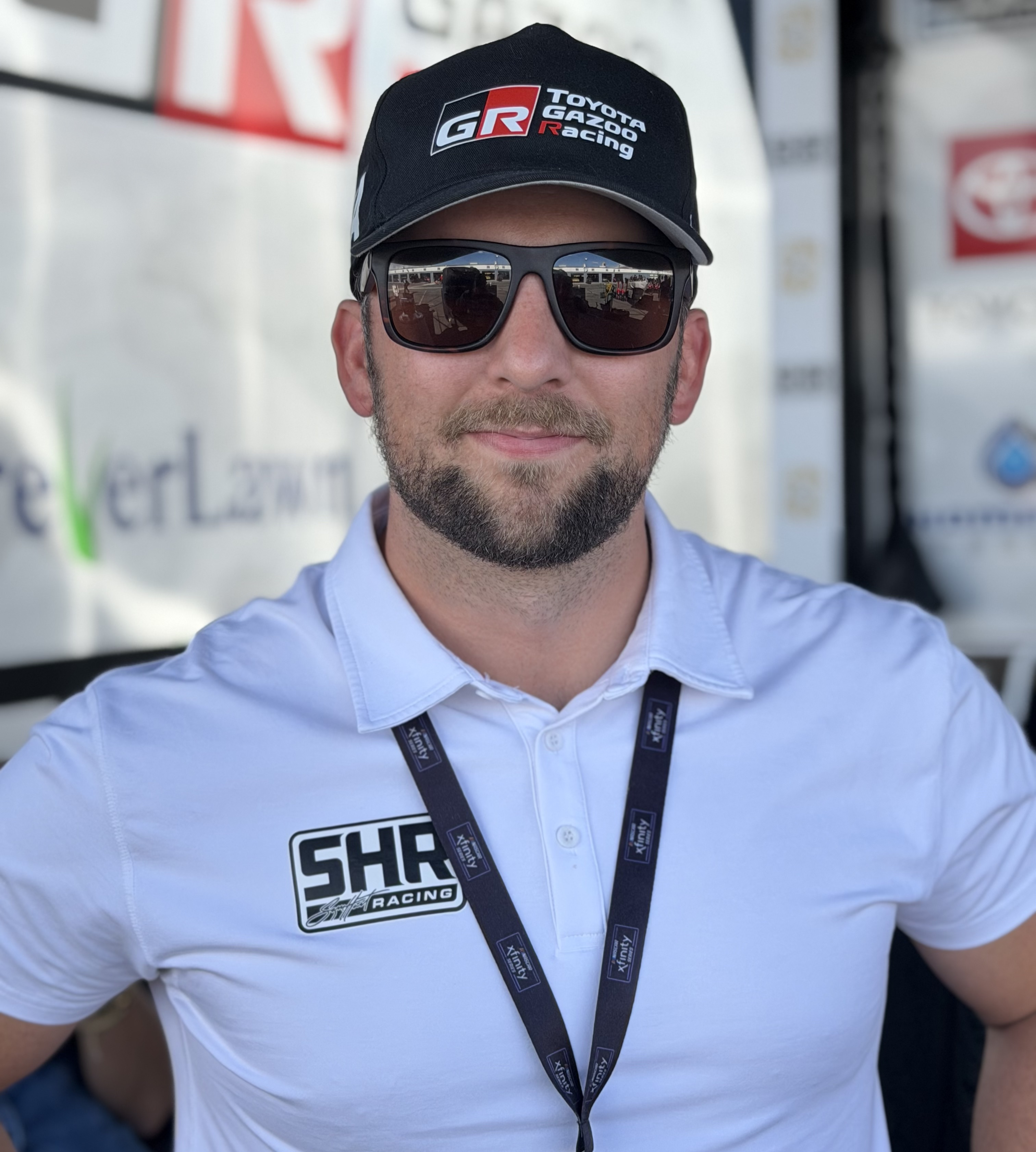
- Hunt in 2025
- Born: June 17, 1993 (age 33); Midlothian, Virginia, U.S.

ARCA Menards Series East career
- 34 races run over 7 years
- Best finish: 13th (2012)
- First race: 2012 Widow Wax 125 (Bristol)
- Last race: 2019 General Tire 125 (Dover)
Wins	Top tens	Poles
0	3	0
- Statistics up to date as of November 1, 2024.

Sam Hunt (born June 17, 1993) is an American former professional stock car racing driver and team owner of Sam Hunt Racing, which currently competes in the NASCAR O'Reilly Auto Parts Series.

Hunt has previously competed in the NASCAR K&N Pro Series East, where he earned three top-ten finishes with a best points finish of thirteenth in 2012. He also competed in the Virginia Late Model Triple Crown Series.

== Motorsports results ==
=== NASCAR ===
(key) (Bold – Pole position awarded by qualifying time. Italics – Pole position earned by points standings or practice time. * – Most laps led.)

==== K&N Pro Series East ====
NASCAR K&N Pro Series East results
Year	Team	No.	Make	1	2	3	4	5	6	7	8	9	10	11	12	13	14	15	16	NKNPSEC	Pts	Ref
2012	Precision Performance Motorsports	22	Dodge	BRI; 24	GRE; 14	RCH; 25			JFC; 12			COL; 11			DOV; 19					13th	370	
2012	Precision Performance Motorsports	23	Dodge				IOW; 25													13th	370	
2012	Precision Performance Motorsports	22	Toyota					BGS; 15		LGY; 13	CNB; 18			NHA; 20		GRE; 7	CAR; 26			13th	370	
2012	Precision Performance Motorsports	23	Toyota										IOW; 17							13th	370	
2013	DRIVE Technology	18	Toyota	BRI; 32	GRE; 6	FIF	RCH; 18	BGS	IOW	LGY; 13	COL; 21	IOW	VIR; 20	GRE; 11	NHA	DOV; 18	RAL			20th	213	
2014	DRIVE Technology	18	Toyota	NSM; 28	DAY; INQ	BRI; 18	GRE; 26	RCH; 25	IOW	BGS; 14	FIF	LGY	NHA	COL	IOW	GLN	VIR; 16	GRE; 19	DOV	26th	162	
2015	DRIVE Technology	18	Toyota	NSM	GRE	BRI	IOW	BGS	LGY; 21	COL	NHA	IOW	GLN	MOT	VIR	RCH; 16	DOV			41st	51	
2016	Hunt-Sellers Racing	18	Toyota	NSM	MOB	GRE	BRI	VIR	DOM; Wth	STA	COL	NHA	IOW	GLN	GRE	NJM	DOV			N/A	0	
2017	Hunt-Sellers Racing	18	Toyota	NSM	GRE	BRI; 18	SBO	SBO	MEM	BLN	TMP	NHA	IOW	GLN	LGY; 9	NJM	DOV			31st	61	
2019	Sam Hunt Racing	18	Chevy	NSM	BRI	SBO	SBO	MEM	NHA	IOW	GLN	BRI	GTW	NHA	DOV; 13					40th	31	
