= Kyle Benjamin =

American racing driver (born 1997)

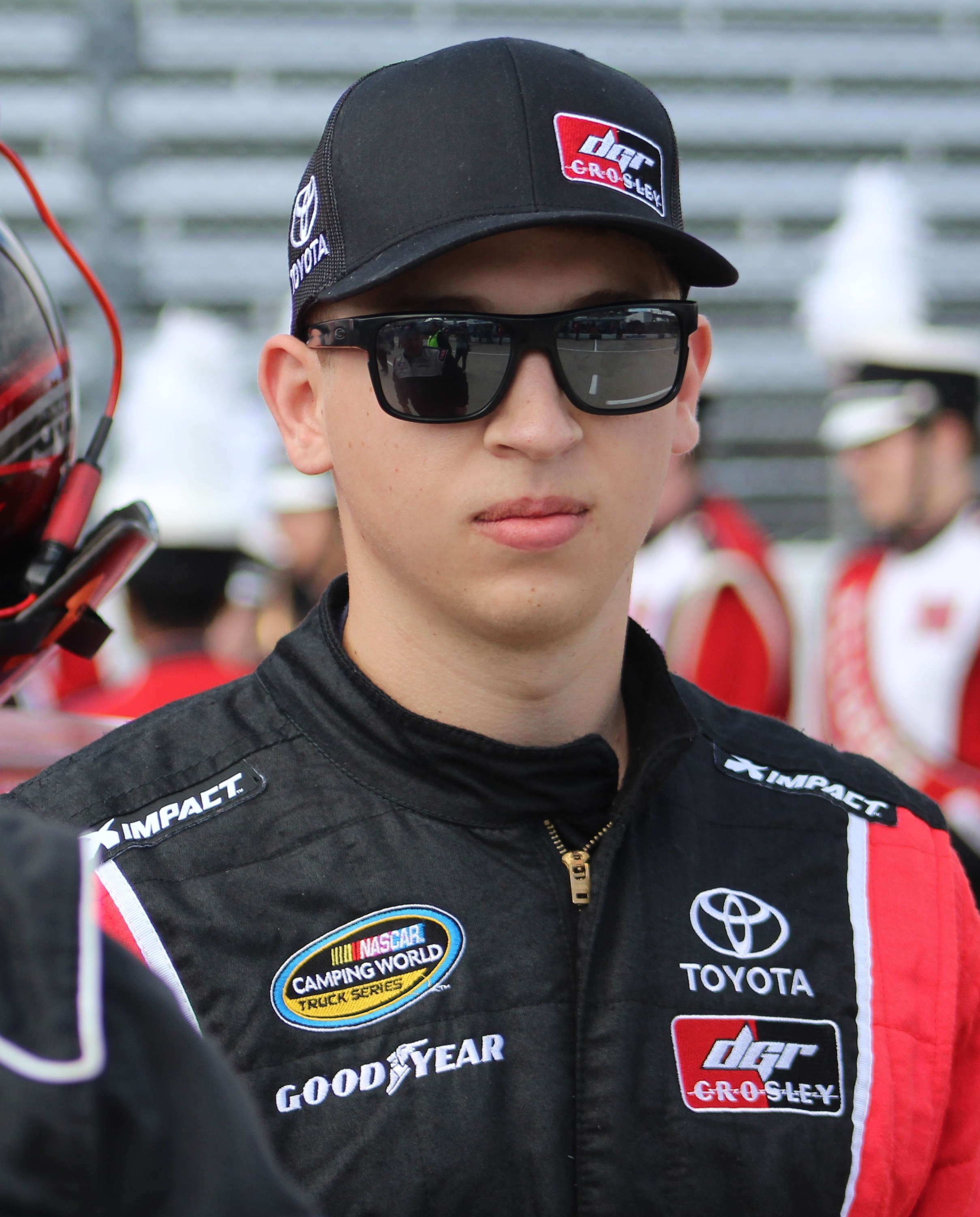
- Benjamin at Martinsville Speedway in 2018
- Born: Kyle S. Benjamin; November 3, 1997 (age 29); Easley, South Carolina, U.S.
- Achievements: 2012 World Series of Asphalt Super Late Model Champion; 2013 Rattler 250 Winner; 2013 Pete Orr Memorial Winner; 2014 Lee Fields Memorial Winner; 2012 CRA Super Series Southern Division Champion; Youngest Bandolero Nationals champion (age 10)

NASCAR O'Reilly Auto Parts Series career
- 8 races run over 2 years
- 2018 position: 40th
- Best finish: 33rd (2017)
- First race: 2017 ToyotaCare 250 (Richmond)
- Last race: 2018 Rock N Roll Tequila 170 (Mid-Ohio)
Wins	Top tens	Poles
0	3	2

NASCAR FedEx Freight Truck Series career
- 5 races run over 2 years
- 2019 position: 49th
- Best finish: 49th (2019)
- First race: 2018 Alpha Energy Solutions 250 (Martinsville)
- Last race: 2019 CarShield 200 (Gateway)
Wins	Top tens	Poles
0	2	0

ARCA Menards Series career
- 23 races run over 5 years
- Best finish: 17th (2013)
- First race: 2013 ARCA Mobile 200 (Mobile)
- Last race: 2017 Scott 150 (Chicagoland)
- First win: 2013 Herr's Live Life With Flavor 200 (Madison)
- Last win: 2017 Winchester ARCA 200 (Winchester)
Wins	Top tens	Poles
3	17	3
- Statistics up to date as of November 15, 2025.

Kyle S. Benjamin (born November 3, 1997) is an American professional stock car racing driver. He currently competes part-time in Pro Late Model competition, driving the No. 9 for Jett Motorsports. Benjamin has also competed part-time in the NASCAR Xfinity Series for Joe Gibbs Racing. He is a member of the 2015 NASCAR Next class and has formerly competed in the NASCAR Xfinity Series, Camping World Truck Series, and K&N Pro Series East.

== Racing career ==
=== Early years ===
Starting to race competitively when he was six years old, Benjamin became the youngest winner of the Bandolero nationals, winning the event when he was ten years old. Three years later, he moved into late model racing, in both the Pro and Stock divisions. At the age of fifteen, Benjamin captured the World Series of Asphalt title at New Smyrna Speedway, and won at various other notable tracks around the country such as Winchester Speedway and Lucas Oil Raceway.

=== ARCA Racing Series ===
Running a partial schedule for Venturini Motorsports in 2013, Benjamin won the pole at Toledo Speedway to become the series youngest pole winner and won in only his sixth start at Madison International Speedway to become the series' youngest winner at the time. He won two starts later as well. Running a limited schedule for Roulo Brothers Racing in 2014, Benjamin switched to his team in mid-2014 due to underwhelming performance. After reuniting with Venturini for a race in 2015, Benjamin ran a limited schedule in 2016 as part of his affiliation with Ranier Racing with MDM.

=== K&N Pro Series East ===
Running a race for Ken Schrader Racing in 2013, then three for his team in 2014, Benjamin caught his break in 2015, winning his first race (at Bristol Motor Speedway), being named to the NASCAR Next class, and finishing ninth in points. Signing on with Ranier Racing with MDM before the 2016 season, Benjamin won five poles, three races and finished runner-up to Justin Haley by only twenty-two points.

=== Gander Outdoors Truck Series ===
On March 19, 2018, it was announced that Benjamin would make his Truck Series debut driving the No. 54 Tundra for DGR-Crosley at Martinsville Speedway. He led over a quarter of the race but finished second to John Hunter Nemechek in a close finish. Benjamin returned to the organization, this time driving the No. 17, for the fall Martinsville race, starting and finishing fifth in a truck that Benjamin believed could have finished second.

In 2019, Benjamin returned to the Truck Series on a seven-race schedule in the No. 45 Chevrolet Silverado for Niece Motorsports.

=== Xfinity Series ===
On April 5, 2017, it was announced that Benjamin would run five races for Joe Gibbs Racing in the 2017 NASCAR Xfinity Series: three in the No. 18 (two at Iowa Speedway and Kentucky Speedway) and two in the No. 20 (his debut at Richmond International Raceway and a race at Pocono Raceway). He won his first pole at Pocono, and went on to lead 28 laps, the second-most of anybody else behind eventual winner Brad Keselowski. At Iowa, Benjamin led five laps, but lost out to JGR teammate Ryan Preece and finished second. He returned to the team in 2018, announcing a two-race slate in February. After an eighth-place run at Atlanta Motor Speedway, a run for the win on the final restart at Iowa was derailed after John Hunter Nemechek made contact with Benjamin.

=== Whelen Modified Tour ===
On February 1, 2019, it was announced that Benjamin would contest a part of the 2019 NASCAR Whelen Modified Tour schedule for LFR Chassis in the No. 15 car. The schedule was later revealed to be eight races, and Benjamin stated in April that there may be an opportunity in the NASCAR Gander Outdoors Truck Series later on. He ended up not running any races in the Modified Tour.

=== Return to racing ===
After seven years away from the sport, in November 2025, Benjamin entered the Hoosier 100 at New Smyrna Speedway. Driving the No. 9 Pro Late Model for Jett Motorsports, his car did not start the race due to an engine failure in practice.

== Personal life ==
Benjamin was homeschooled during his high school years.

After pausing his racing career in 2019, Benjamin moved to Colorado where he went to college and worked what he called "some fun jobs".

== Motorsports career results ==
=== Stock car career summary ===
Season	Series	Team	Races	Wins	Top 5	Top 10	Points	Position
2013	NASCAR K&N Pro Series East	Ken Schrader Racing	1	0	1	1	42	49th
2013	ARCA Racing Series	Venturini Motorsports	8	2	4	6	1620	17th
2014	NASCAR K&N Pro Series West	Benjamin Motorsports	1	0	0	0	17	82nd
2014	NASCAR K&N Pro Series East	Benjamin Motorsports	3	0	0	0	83	32nd
2014	ARCA Racing Series	Roulo Brothers Racing	5	0	1	3	1330	22nd
2014	ARCA Racing Series	Benjamin Motorsports	2	0	1	2	1330	22nd
2015	NASCAR K&N Pro Series East	Benjamin Motorsports	13	1	3	6	443	9th
2015	ARCA Racing Series	Venturini Motorsports	1	0	0	0	90	131st
2016	NASCAR K&N Pro Series East	Ranier Racing with MDM	14	3	9	11	558	**2nd**
2016	ARCA Racing Series	Ranier Racing with MDM	4	0	2	4	855	32nd
2017	NASCAR K&N Pro Series East	MDM Motorsports	1	1	1	1	47	37th
2017	ARCA Racing Series	Venturini Motorsports	1	0	0	1	615	36th
2017	ARCA Racing Series	MDM Motorsports	2	1	1	1	615	36th
2017	NASCAR Xfinity Series	Joe Gibbs Racing	5	0	1	1	152	33rd
2018	NASCAR K&N Pro Series East	Hattori Racing Enterprises	1	0	0	1	34	46th
2018	NASCAR Camping World Truck Series	DGR-Crosley	2	0	2	2	0	NC†
2018	NASCAR Xfinity Series	Joe Gibbs Racing	3	0	1	2	102	40th
2019	NASCAR K&N Pro Series East	GMS Racing	0	0	0	0	0	N/A
2019	NASCAR Gander Outdoors Truck Series	Niece Motorsports	3	0	0	0	54	49th
2026	ASA STARS National Tour	Jett Motorsports	1	0	0	0		

^{†} As Benjamin was a guest driver, he was ineligible for championship points.

=== NASCAR ===
(key) (Bold – Pole position awarded by qualifying time. Italics – Pole position earned by points standings or practice time. * – Most laps led. ** – All laps led.)

==== Xfinity Series ====
NASCAR Xfinity Series results
Year	Team	No.	Make	1	2	3	4	5	6	7	8	9	10	11	12	13	14	15	16	17	18	19	20	21	22	23	24	25	26	27	28	29	30	31	32	33	NXSC	Pts	Ref
2017	Joe Gibbs Racing	20	Toyota	DAY	ATL	LVS	PHO	CAL	TEX	BRI	RCH; 32	TAL	CLT	DOV	**POC**; 16	MCH																					33rd	152	
2017	Joe Gibbs Racing	18	Toyota														IOW; 31	DAY	KEN	NHA	IND	IOW; 2	GLN	MOH	BRI	ROA	DAR	RCH	CHI	**KEN**; 12	DOV	CLT	KAN	TEX	PHO	HOM	33rd	152	
2018	Joe Gibbs Racing	18	Toyota	DAY	ATL; 8	LVS	PHO	CAL	TEX	BRI	RCH	TAL	DOV	CLT	POC	MCH	IOW	CHI	DAY	KEN	NHA	IOW; 3	GLN	MOH; 13	BRI	ROA	DAR	IND	LVS	RCH	CLT	DOV	KAN	TEX	PHO	HOM	40th	102	

==== Gander Outdoors Truck Series ====
NASCAR Gander Outdoors Truck Series results
Year	Team	No.	Make	1	2	3	4	5	6	7	8	9	10	11	12	13	14	15	16	17	18	19	20	21	22	23	NGOTC	Pts	Ref
2018	DGR-Crosley	54	Toyota	DAY	ATL	LVS	MAR; 2	DOV	KAN	CLT	TEX	IOW	GTW	CHI	KEN	ELD	POC	MCH	BRI	MSP	LVS	TAL					92nd	0^{1}	
2018	DGR-Crosley	17	Toyota																				MAR; 5	TEX	PHO	HOM	92nd	0^{1}	
2019	Niece Motorsports	45	Chevy	DAY	ATL	LVS	MAR	TEX	DOV	KAN	CLT	TEX; 31	IOW; 13														49th	54	
2019	Niece Motorsports	44	Chevy											GTW; 13	CHI	KEN	POC	ELD	MCH	BRI	MSP	LVS	TAL	MAR	PHO	HOM	49th	54	

==== K&N Pro Series East ====
NASCAR K&N Pro Series East results
Year	Team	No.	Make	1	2	3	4	5	6	7	8	9	10	11	12	13	14	15	16	NKNPSEC	Pts	Ref
2013	Ken Schrader Racing	52	Dodge	BRI	GRE	FIF	RCH	BGS	IOW	LGY	COL	IOW	VIR	GRE	NHA	DOV; 3	RAL			49th	42	
2014	Benjamin Motorsports	27	Ford	NSM	DAY	BRI	GRE	RCH	IOW	BGS	FIF	LGY	NHA; 11	COL	IOW; 14	GLN	VIR	GRE	DOV; 24	32nd	83	
2015	Benjamin Motorsports	27	Ford	NSM; 5	GRE; 12	BRI; 1*	IOW; 6	BGS; 13	LGY; 2	COL; 16	NHA; 14		GLN; 14	MOT; 16	VIR	RCH; 9	DOV; 16			9th	443	
2015	Benjamin Motorsports	72	Ford									IOW; 10								9th	443	
2016	Ranier Racing with MDM	40	Chevy	NSM; 4	MOB; 6	**GRE**; 2*	BRI; 2	VIR; 4	**DOM**; 23*	STA; 12	COL; 11	**NHA**; 4*	**IOW**; 1	GLN; 6	**GRE**; 1**	NJM; 3	DOV; 1*			2nd	558	
2017	MDM Motorsports	40	Toyota	NSM	**GRE**; 1	BRI	SBO	SBO	MEM	BLN	TMP	NHA	IOW	GLN	LGY	NJM	DOV			37th	47	
2018	Hattori Racing Enterprises	1	Toyota	NSM	BRI	LGY	SBO	SBO	MEM	NJM	THO	NHA	IOW; 10	GLN	GTW	NHA	DOV			46th	34	
2019	GMS Racing	21	Chevy	NSM	BRI	SBO	SBO; RL^{†}	MEM	THO	NHA	IOW	GLN	BRI	GTW	NHA	DOV				N/A	0	
^{†} - Relieved Sam Mayer

==== K&N Pro Series West ====
NASCAR K&N Pro Series West results
Year	Team	No.	Make	1	2	3	4	5	6	7	8	9	10	11	12	13	14	NKNPSWC	Pts	Ref
2014	Benjamin Motorsports	27	Ford	PHO	IRW	S99	IOW	KCR	SON	SLS	CNS	IOW	EVG	KCR	MMP	AAS	PHO; 27	82nd	17	

^{*} Season still in progress
^{1} Ineligible for series points

=== ARCA Racing Series ===
ARCA Racing Series results
Year	Team	No.	Make	1	2	3	4	5	6	7	8	9	10	11	12	13	14	15	16	17	18	19	20	21	ARSC	Pts	Ref
2013	Venturini Motorsports	55	Toyota	DAY	MOB; 2	SLM; 11	TAL	**TOL**; 23											MAD; 1*	DSF	IOW; 5	SLM; 1*	KEN	KAN	17th	1620	
2013	Venturini Motorsports	55	Chevy						ELK; 7	POC	MCH	ROA	WIN; 8	CHI	NJE	POC	BLN	ISF							17th	1620	
2014	Roulo Brothers Racing	17	Ford	DAY	MOB; 2	SLM; 12	TAL	TOL; 19	NJE; 6	POC	MCH	ELK; 7	WIN	CHI	IRP	POC	BLN	ISF							22nd	1330	
2014	Benjamin Racing	37	Ford																MAD; 2	DSF	SLM; 7	KEN	KAN		22nd	1330	
2015	Venturini Motorsports	15	Toyota	DAY	MOB	NSH	SLM	TAL	TOL	NJE	POC; 28	MCH	CHI	WIN	IOW	IRP	POC	BLN	ISF	DSF	SLM	KEN	KAN		131st	90	
2016	Ranier Racing with MDM	28	Chevy	DAY	NSH	SLM	TAL	TOL	NJE	POC; 6	MCH; 3	MAD	WIN	**IOW**; 2	IRP; 7	POC	BLN	ISF	DSF	SLM	CHI	KEN	KAN		32nd	855	
2017	Venturini Motorsports	15	Toyota	DAY	NSH	SLM	TAL	TOL	ELK	POC	MCH; 7	MAD	IOW	IRP	POC										36th	615	
2017	MDM Motorsports	28	Toyota													**WIN**; 1	ISF	ROA	DSF	SLM					36th	615	
2017	MDM Motorsports	41	Toyota																		CHI; 12	KEN	KAN		36th	615	

=== ASA STARS National Tour ===
(key) (Bold – Pole position awarded by qualifying time. Italics – Pole position earned by points standings or practice time. * – Most laps led. ** – All laps led.)

ASA STARS National Tour results
Year	Team	No.	Make	1	2	3	4	5	6	7	8	9	10	11	ASNTC	Pts	Ref
2026	Jett Motorsports	9	Toyota	NSM; 27	FIF	HCY	SLG	MAD	NPS	OWO	TRI	WIN	NSV	NSM	-*	-*	
