= Chase Cabre =

American racing driver (born 1997)

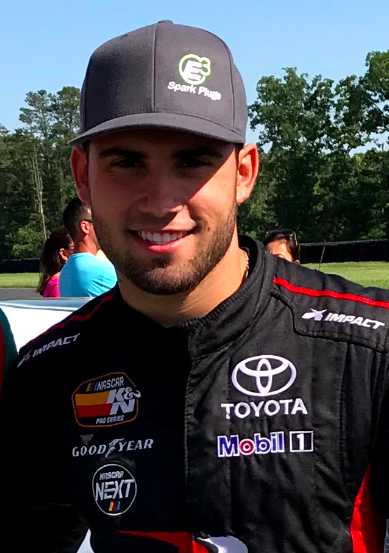
- Cabre at New Jersey Motorsports Park in 2018
- Nationality: American
- Born: February 7, 1997 (age 29) Tampa, Florida, U.S.
- Relatives: Collin Cabre (brother)

NASCAR K&N Pro Series East career
- Debut season: 2017
- Years active: 2017–2020
- Car number: 4
- Starts: 46
- Championships: 0
- Wins: 2
- Poles: 5
- Statistics up to date as of October 11, 2020.

Chase Cabre (born February 7, 1997) is an American stock car racing driver. He last competed full-time in the ARCA Menards Series East, driving the No. 4 Toyota Camry for Rev Racing. Cabre started his racing career in motocross and later moved to micro-sprints while balancing a soccer career in his formative years. At the end of his four-year tenure with Rev in the developmental stock car ranks, Cabre elected not to chase further stock car opportunities via a pay route and instead chose to return to dirt racing.

He is the younger brother of Collin Cabre, who has also competed in the East Series. He is currently engaged to fellow NASCAR driver Hailie Deegan.

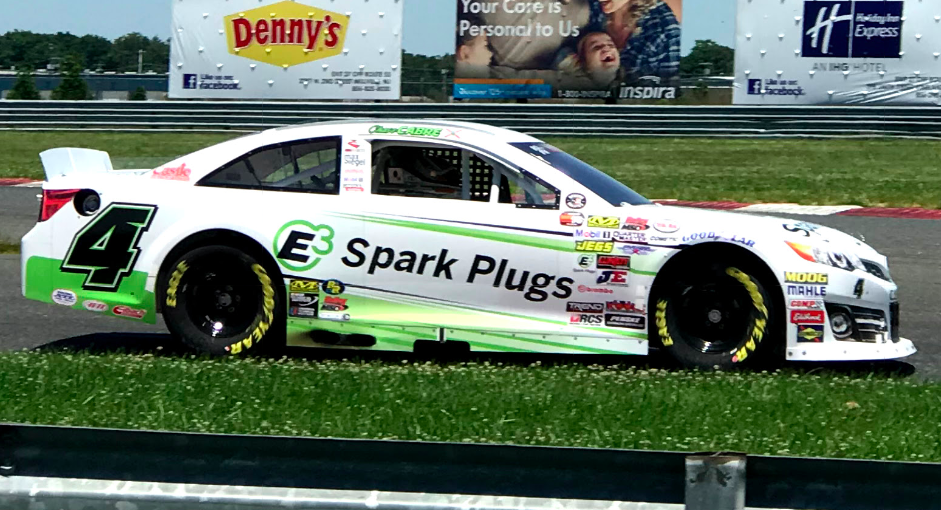
Cabre on track at New Jersey Motorsports Park in 2018

== Motorsports career results ==
=== ARCA Menards Series ===
(key) (Bold – Pole position awarded by qualifying time. Italics – Pole position earned by points standings or practice time. * – Most laps led.)

ARCA Menards Series results
Year	Team	No.	Make	1	2	3	4	5	6	7	8	9	10	11	12	13	14	15	16	17	18	19	20	AMSC	Pts	Ref
2020	Rev Racing	4E	Toyota	DAY	PHO; 8	TAL	POC	IRP	KEN	IOW	KAN	TOL	TOL	MCH	DAY	GTW; 10	L44	TOL; 16	BRI; 21	WIN	MEM	ISF	KAN	29th	121	

==== ARCA Menards Series East ====
ARCA Menards Series East results
Year	Team	No.	Make	1	2	3	4	5	6	7	8	9	10	11	12	13	14	AMSEC	Pts	Ref
2017	Rev Racing	4	Toyota	NSM; 12	GRE; 13	BRI; 19	**SBO**; 7	**SBO**; 4	MEM; 2	BLN; 3		NHA; 16	IOW; 5	GLN; 7	LGY; 11	NJM; 13	DOV; 11	6th	485	
2017	Rev Racing	6	Toyota								TMP; 10							6th	485	
2018	Rev Racing	4	Toyota	NSM; 19	BRI; 26	LGY; 8	SBO; 13	SBO; 10	MEM; 4	NJM; 14			IOW; 24	GLN; 14	GTW; 5	NHA; 8	DOV; 8	7th	452	
2018	Rev Racing	15	Toyota								TMP; 5	NHA; 8						7th	452	
2019	Rev Racing	4	Toyota	NSM; 17	BRI; 2	SBO; 8	SBO; 2	MEM; 1	**NHA**; 1*	IOW; 5	GLN; 2	**BRI**; 8	**GTW**; 13*	**NHA**; 6	DOV; 5			2nd	472	
2020	Rev Racing	4	Toyota	NSM; 9	TOL; 4	DOV; 8	TOL; 16	BRI; 21	FIF; 14									7th	292	
