= Sioux Chief PowerPEX 200 =

Sioux Chief PowerPEX 200 may refer to several ARCA Menards Series races:

- Sioux Chief PowerPEX 200 (IRP), now Reeses 200, a 2015–2017 race at Lucas Oil Indianapolis Raceway Park
- Sioux Chief PowerPEX 200 (Toledo), a 2019 race at Toledo Speedway
- Sioux Chief PowerPEX 200 (Memphis), a 2020 race at Memphis Motorsports Park
- Sioux Chief PowerPEX 200 (Salem), a 2021 race at Salem Speedway, Indiana
