= Hunter Baize =

American racing driver

- Born: December 2, 1997 (age 28); Bremen, Kentucky, U.S.

ARCA Menards Series career
- 2 races run over 1 year
- Best finish: 64th (2015)
- First race: 2015 Federated Auto Parts 200 (Berlin)
- Last race: 2015 Allen Crowe 100 (Springfield)
Wins	Top tens	Poles
0	2	0

ARCA Menards Series East career
- 22 races run over 2 years
- Best finish: 4th (2016)
- First race: 2016 Jet Tools 150 (New Smyrma)
- Last race: 2017 Busch North Throwback 100 (Thompson)
Wins	Top tens	Poles
0	15	0
- Statistics up to date as of November 16, 2024.

Hunter Baize (born December 2, 1997) is an American former professional stock car racing driver and who has competed in the NASCAR K&N Pro Series East and the ARCA Racing Series.

Baize has also previously competed in series such as the ASA CRA Super Series, the ASA Southern Super Series, the CRA JEGS All-Stars Tour, and the World Series of Asphalt Stock Car Racing.

== Motorsports results ==
=== NASCAR ===
(key) (Bold - Pole position awarded by qualifying time. Italics - Pole position earned by points standings or practice time. * – Most laps led.)

==== K&N Pro Series East ====
NASCAR K&N Pro Series East results
Year	Team	No.	Make	1	2	3	4	5	6	7	8	9	10	11	12	13	14	NKNPSEC	Pts	Ref
2016	HScott Motorsports with Justin Marks	13	Chevy	NSM; 29	MOB; 8	GRE; 10	BRI; 16	VIR; 6	DOM; 8	STA; 9	COL; 8	NHA; 6	IOW; 5	GLN; 9	GRE; 14	NJM; 10	DOV; 15	4th	463	
2017	Martin-McClure Racing	13	Chevy	NSM; 7		BRI; 4		SBO; 7	MEM; 6	BLN; 11*								11th	283	
2017	Martin-McClure Racing	13	Toyota		GRE; 7		SBO; 17				TMP; 12	NHA	IOW	GLN	LGY	NJM	DOV	11th	283	

=== ARCA Racing Series ===
(key) (Bold – Pole position awarded by qualifying time. Italics – Pole position earned by points standings or practice time. * – Most laps led.)

ARCA Racing Series results
Year	Team	No.	Make	1	2	3	4	5	6	7	8	9	10	11	12	13	14	15	16	17	18	19	20	ARSC	Pts	Ref
2015	Ken Schrader Racing	52	Chevy	DAY	MOB	NSH	SLM	TAL	TOL	NJE	POC	MCH	CHI	WIN	IOW	IRP	POC	BLN; 9	ISF; 6	DSF	SLM	KEN	KAN	64th	385	
