= Anthony Sergi =

American racing driver

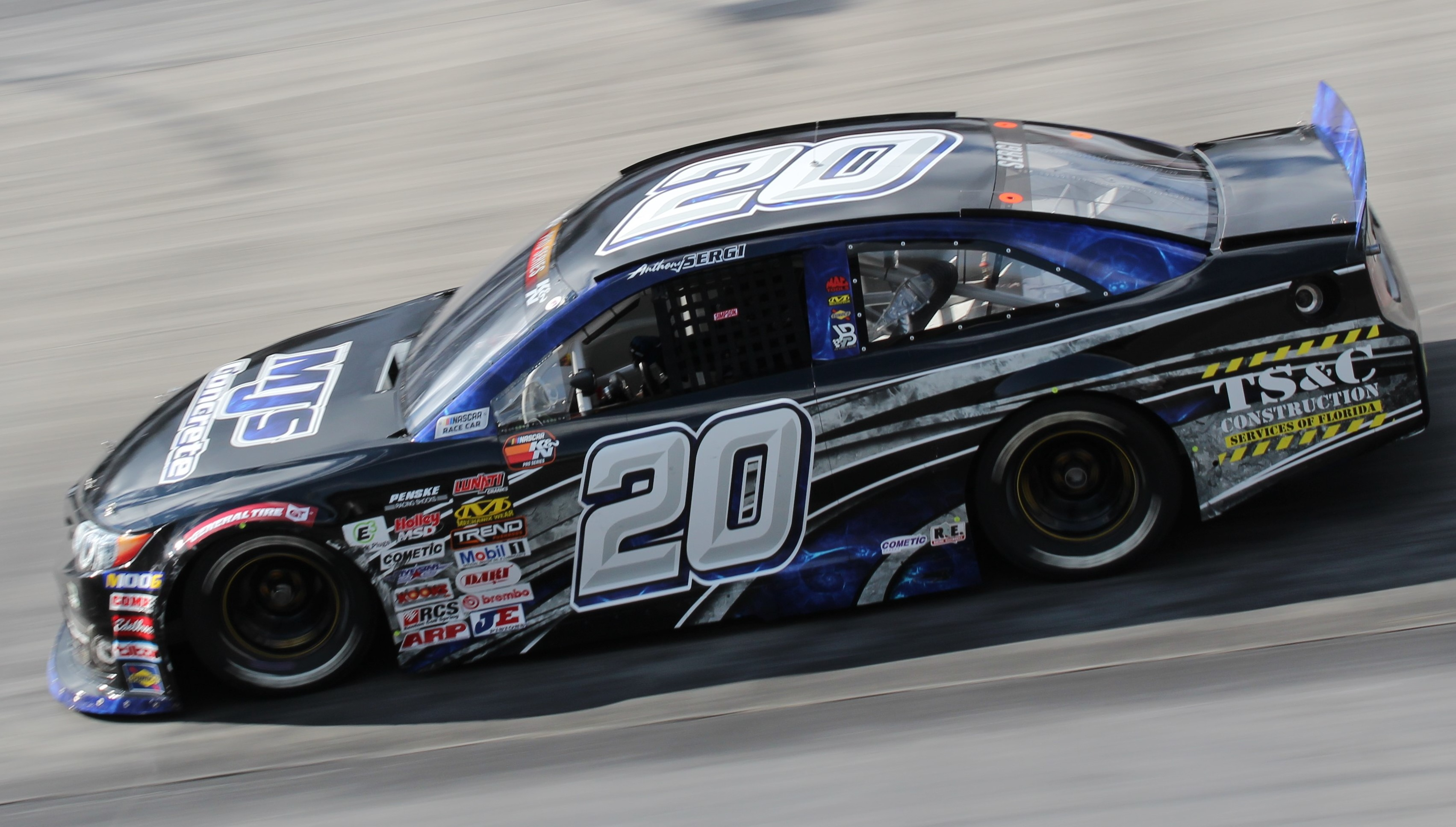
- Sergi's No. 20 car at Bristol Motor Speedway in 2019
- Born: Anthony M. Sergi; June 1, 1995 (age 31); Oviedo, Florida, U.S.

ARCA Menards Series East career
- 4 races run over 3 years
- Best finish: 25th (2019)
- First race: 2017 Jet Tools 150 (New Smyrna)
- Last race: 2019 Zombie Auto 150 (Bristol)
Wins	Top tens	Poles
0	2	0
- Statistics up to date as of November 17, 2024.

Anthony M. Sergi (born June 1, 1995) is an American professional stock car racing driver who has competed in the NASCAR K&N Pro Series East. He currently serves as an engineer for Joe Gibbs Racing.

Sergi has also previously competed in series such as the ASA STARS National Tour, the ASA CRA Super Series, the ASA Southern Super Series, and the Sunshine State Challenge Series.

== Motorsports results ==
=== NASCAR ===
(key) (Bold - Pole position awarded by qualifying time. Italics - Pole position earned by points standings or practice time. * – Most laps led.)

==== K&N Pro Series East ====
NASCAR K&N Pro Series East results
Year	Team	No.	Make	1	2	3	4	5	6	7	8	9	10	11	12	13	14	NKNPSEC	Pts	Ref
2017	Ben Kennedy Racing	20	Toyota	NSM; 14	GRE	BRI	SBO	SBO	MEM	BLN	TMP	NHA	IOW	GLN	LGY	NJM	DOV	59th	30	
2018	Ben Kennedy Racing	20	Toyota	NSM; 7	BRI	LGY	SBO	SBO	MEM	NJM	THO	NHA	IOW	GLN	GTW	NHA	DOV	43rd	37	
2019	Ben Kennedy Racing	20	Toyota	NSM; 5	BRI; 12	SBO	SBO	MEM	NHA	IOW	GLN	BRI	GTW	NHA	DOV			25th	71	

=== CARS Super Late Model Tour ===
(key)

CARS Super Late Model Tour results
Year	Team	No.	Make	1	2	3	4	5	6	7	8	9	CSLMTC	Pts	Ref
2018	Michael Sergi	20	Chevy	MYB	NSH	ROU	HCY	BRI	AND; 22	HCY	ROU	SBO	N/A	0	
2019	Michael Sergi	20	Chevy	SNM	HCY	NSH; 6	MMS						N/A	0	
2019	Michael Sergi	20S	Chevy					BRI; 5	HCY	ROU	SBO		N/A	0	

=== ASA STARS National Tour ===
(key) (Bold – Pole position awarded by qualifying time. Italics – Pole position earned by points standings or practice time. * – Most laps led. ** – All laps led.)

ASA STARS National Tour results
Year	Team	No.	Make	1	2	3	4	5	6	7	8	9	10	ASNTC	Pts	Ref
2023	Anthony Sergi Racing	20	Chevy	FIF	MAD	NWS; 26	HCY	MLW	AND	WIR	TOL	WIN	NSV	96th	26	
2024	Anthony Sergi Racing	20S	N/A	NSM; 26	FIF	HCY	MAD	MLW	AND	OWO	TOL	WIN	NSV	92nd	26	
