= Jared Irvan =

American racing driver

- Born: February 9, 1998 (age 28); Midland, North Carolina, U.S.
- Achievements: 2012 USAC Eastern Ignite Midget Series Champion; 2011 USAC Eastern Young Guns Ford Midget Series Champion
- Awards: 2012 USAC Eastern Ignite Midget Series Rookie of the Year; 2011 USAC Eastern Young Guns Ford Midget Series Rookie of the Year

ARCA Menards Series East career
- 2 races run over 2 years
- Best finish: 53rd (2017)
- First race: 2015 Hart to Heart Breast Cancer Foundation 150 (New Smyrna)
- Last race: 2017 Busch North Throwback 100 (Thompson)
Wins	Top tens	Poles
0	0	0
- Statistics up to date as of November 30, 2025.

Jared Irvan (born February 9, 1998) is an American professional stock car racing driver and who has competed in the NASCAR K&N Pro Series East. He is the son of former NASCAR Cup Series driver Ernie Irvan.

Irvan has also previously competed in series such as the ASA Southern Super Series, the PASS National Championship Super Late Model Series, the PASS South Super Late Model Series, the USAC Eastern Midget Championship, and the World Series of Asphalt Stock Car Racing.

== Motorsports results ==
=== NASCAR ===
(key) (Bold - Pole position awarded by qualifying time. Italics - Pole position earned by points standings or practice time. * – Most laps led.)

==== K&N Pro Series East ====
NASCAR K&N Pro Series East results
Year	Team	No.	Make	1	2	3	4	5	6	7	8	9	10	11	12	13	14	NKNPSEC	Pts	Ref
2015	Ernie Irvan	28	Toyota	NSM; 24	GRE	BRI	IOW	BGS	LGY	COL	NHA	IOW	GLN	MOT	VIR	RCH	DOV	61st	20	
2017	Martin-McClure Racing	4	Toyota	NSM	GRE	BRI	SBO	SBO	MEM	BLN	TMP; 11	NHA	IOW	GLN	LGY	NJM	DOV	53rd	33	

=== CARS Super Late Model Tour ===
(key)

CARS Super Late Model Tour results
Year	Team	No.	Make	1	2	3	4	5	6	7	8	9	10	11	12	13	CSLMTC	Pts	Ref
2016	Coulter Motorsports	2	Chevy	SNM; 6	ROU	HCY	TCM	GRE	ROU	CON	MYB	HCY					34th	48	
2016	Coulter Motorsports	28	Chevy										SNM; 12				34th	48	
2017	Ernie Irvan	28	Chevy	CON	DOM	DOM	HCY	HCY	BRI	AND; 22	ROU	TCM	ROU; 21	HCY	CON	SBO	49th	12	
2019	Coulter Motorsports	2	Chevy	SNM	HCY	NSH	MMS; 23	BRI									28th	27	
2019	Coulter Motorsports	4	Chevy						HCY; 16	ROU	SBO						28th	27	
