= 2018 NASCAR K&N Pro Series East =

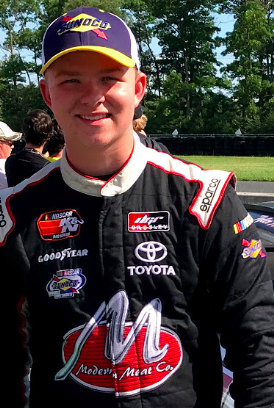
Tyler Ankrum, the 2018 K&N Pro Series East champion.

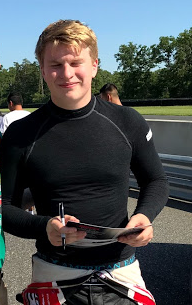
Tyler Dippel finished second in the championship behind Ankrum by 84 points.

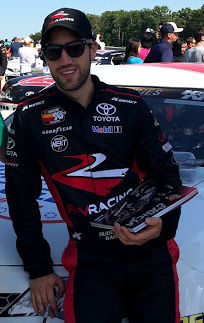
Rubén García Jr. finished third in the championship.

The 2018 NASCAR K&N Pro Series East was the 32nd season of the K&N Pro Series East, a regional stock car racing series sanctioned by NASCAR. It began with the New Smyrna 175 at New Smyrna Speedway on February 11 and concluded with the Crosley 125 at Dover International Speedway on October 6. Harrison Burton entered the season as the defending Drivers' champion. Tyler Ankrum won the championship, 84 points in front of Tyler Dippel.

== Drivers ==
=== Complete schedule ===
Manufacturer	Team	No.	Driver	Crew chief
Ford	Rette Jones Racing	30	Tyler Dippel 1	Mark Rette
Ford	Rette Jones Racing	30	Grant Quinlan (R) 6	Mark Rette
Ford	Rette Jones Racing	30	Tristan Van Wieringen (R) 7	Mark Rette
Toyota	DGR-Crosley	17	Tyler Ankrum (R)	Seth Smith
Toyota	DGR-Crosley	54	Todd Gilliland 2	Marcus Richmond 1 Chris Lawson 13
Toyota	DGR-Crosley	54	Noah Gragson 1	Marcus Richmond 1 Chris Lawson 13
Toyota	DGR-Crosley	54	Tyler Dippel 11	Marcus Richmond 1 Chris Lawson 13
Toyota	MDM Motorsports	40	Anthony Alfredo (R)	Robert Huffman
Toyota	Rev Racing	2	Ryan Vargas (R)	Matt Bucher
Toyota	Rev Racing	4	Chase Cabre	Mark Green 7 Tyler Green 7
Toyota	Rev Racing	6	Rubén García Jr.	Steve Plattenberger
Toyota 5 Chevrolet 9	Bassett Racing	04	Ronnie Bassett Jr.	Kris Bowen 3 Daniel Johnson 6 Nathan Kennedy 5
Chevrolet 9 Toyota 5	Bassett Racing	44	Dillon Bassett	Skip Eyler
Chevrolet 12 Ford 2	Danny Watts Racing	82	Spencer Davis	Jerry Babb 5 Scott Davis 1 Matt Noyce 5 Ryan London 3

=== Limited schedule ===
Manufacturer	Team	No.	Driver	Crew chief	Rounds
Chevrolet	1/4 Ley Racing	32	Dale Quarterley	Mike Sibley	1
Chevrolet	Ace Motorsports	71	Bill Hoff	Dave Strother 2 Jeff Swenson 1 Unknown 1	4
Chevrolet	Kart Idaho Racing	08	John Wood	Mike Holleran	2
Chevrolet	Marsh Racing	31	Jimmy Zacharias (R)	Todd Fisette	2
Chevrolet	Marsh Racing	31	Connor Hall (R)	Todd Fisette	3
Chevrolet	Marsh Racing	31	Chase Dowling (R)	Todd Fisette	1
Chevrolet	Marsh Racing	31	Scott Heckert	Todd Fisette	1
Chevrolet	Morgan Racing	23	J. P. Morgan	James Beck	3
Chevrolet	NextGen Motorsports	25	David Levine	Kase Kallenbach	1
Chevrolet	NextGen Motorsports	25	Juan Manuel González (R)	Rob White	1
Chevrolet	Robert Pawlowski Racing	11	Robert Pawlowski (R)	Aaron Brown	1
Chevrolet	Trey Hutchens Racing	14	Trey Hutchens	Bobby Hutchens Jr.	3
Chevrolet	Visconti Motorsports	74	Brandon McReynolds	Doug Chouinard 1 Bruce Cook 9	9
Chevrolet	Visconti Motorsports	74	Austin Hill	Doug Chouinard 1 Bruce Cook 9	1
Chevrolet	Young's Motorsports	28	Tanner Thorson (R)	Andrew Abbott	1
Ford	Brandon Oakley Racing	51	Brandon Oakley (R)	Gary Estes	2
Ford	Jefferson Pitts Racing	7	Will Rodgers	Jason Jefferson 1 Jeff Jefferson 1	2
Ford	Jefferson Pitts Racing	7	Devin Dodson	Jerry Pitts	1
Ford	Jefferson Pitts Racing	55	Cole Keatts	Jerry Pitts	1
Ford	Jefferson Pitts Racing	59	Reid Lanpher (R)	Jerry Pitts 1 Jeff Jefferson 1	2
Ford	Patriot Motorsports Group	43	Armani Williams (R)	Ron Otto	1
Toyota	Ben Kennedy Racing	20	Anthony Sergi (R)	Glenn Garrison	1
Toyota	Bill McAnally Racing	16	Derek Kraus	John Camilleri	6
Toyota	Bill McAnally Racing	19	Hailie Deegan (R)	Joe Draper 2 Ty Joiner 2 Kevin Reed Jr. 1 Kevin Reed 1	6
Toyota	Bill McAnally Racing	99	Cole Rouse	Bryan Tasnady 2 Chris Nelle 1 Rob Dixon 3	6
Toyota	Calabrese Motorsports	43	Joe Graf Jr. (R)	Ron Otto	1
Toyota	Calabrese Motorsports	43	Eddie MacDonald	Ron Otto	1
Toyota	DGR-Crosley	1	Derek Kraus	Kyle Moon	2
Toyota	DGR-Crosley	20	Erik Jones	Kevin Manion	1
Toyota	DGR-Crosley	98	Todd Gilliland	Marcus Richmond	1
Toyota	DGR-Crosley	98	Noah Gragson	Ryan Fugle	1
Toyota	DGR-Crosley	98	Riley Herbst	Kevin Manion	1
Toyota	Hattori Racing Enterprises	1	Kyle Benjamin	Mark Hillman	1
Toyota	Hattori Racing Enterprises	1	Brett Moffitt	Scott Zipadelli	1
Toyota	Hunt-Sellers Racing	18	Colin Garrett (R)	Clinton Cram	12
Toyota	Kart Idaho Racing	39	Andrew Tuttle (R)	C. J. Turnbough	1
Toyota	MDM Motorsports	12	Harrison Burton	Shane Huffman	5
Toyota	MDM Motorsports	12	Sam Mayer (R)	Mardy Lindley	2
Toyota	MDM Motorsports	41	Sam Mayer (R)	Mardy Lindley	2
Toyota	MDM Motorsports	41	Tyler Dippel	Jeff Stankiewicz	1
Toyota	NextGen Motorsports	25	Thomas Ferrando (R)	Ryan Bell	1
Toyota	NextGen Motorsports	55	Abraham Calderón (R)	Wayne Setterington Jr. 6 Rob White 2	2
Toyota	NextGen Motorsports	55	Marcos Gomes (R)	Wayne Setterington Jr. 6 Rob White 2	5
Toyota	NextGen Motorsports	55	Juan Manuel González (R)	Wayne Setterington Jr. 6 Rob White 2	1
Toyota	Rev Racing	42	Ernie Francis Jr. (R)	Johnny Allen	3
Toyota	TC Motorsports	91	Justin Carroll	Dwaine Skinnell	3
Ford 3 Chevrolet 1	Jefferson Pitts Racing	27	Max Tullman (R)	Doug Richert	1
Ford 3 Chevrolet 1	Jefferson Pitts Racing	27	Sam Mayer (R)	Jerry Pitts	2
Ford 3 Chevrolet 1	Jefferson Pitts Racing	27	Bubba Wallace	Jerry Pitts	1
Ford 2 Chevrolet 4	Charles Buchanan Racing	87	Chuck Buchanan Jr.	Craig Wood	6
Toyota 5 Chevrolet 5	NextGen Motorsports	5	Juan Manuel González (R)	Kase Kallenbach 5 Teddy Brown 2 Rob White 2	8
Toyota 5 Chevrolet 5	NextGen Motorsports	5	Dale Quarterley	Kase Kallenbach 5 Teddy Brown 2 Rob White 2	1
Chevrolet 2 Ford 2	Levin Racing	10	Matt Levin	Ron Norman 2 Roger Bracken 1	3
Chevrolet 2 Ford 2	Levin Racing	10	Will Rodgers (R) (Note: Will Rodgers was scored as a Rookie in the Monaco Gateway Classic at Gateway.)	Erik Higley	1
Chevrolet 2 Ford 1	Patriot Motorsports Group	32	Salvatore Iovino	Sue McCarty 1 John Wood 1 Kevin McCarty 1	3
Chevrolet 1 Toyota 1	Patriot Motorsports Group	36	Jesse Iwuji	Terry Elmore 1 Mike Holleran 1	2
Toyota 2 Ford 1	Patriot Motorsports Group	43	Kody Vanderwal	Jason Dickenson	3

== Schedule ==
On December 6, 2017, NASCAR announced the 2018 schedule. Greenville-Pickens and Berlin were dropped from the schedule in favor of Gateway and a second race at New Hampshire. All races in the season - with the exception of the race at New Jersey Motorsports Park, of which extended highlights were shown on NASCAR America - were televised on NBCSN on a tape delay basis. In addition the New Smyrna 175 and the Apple Barrel 125 were shown live on FansChoice.tv.

No.	Race title	Track	Date
1	New Smyrna 175	New Smyrna Speedway, New Smyrna Beach, Florida	February 11
2	Zombie Auto 150	Bristol Motor Speedway, Bristol, Tennessee	April 14
3	Visit Hampton VA 150	Langley Speedway, Hampton, Virginia	April 28
4	Who's Your Driver Twin 100s	South Boston Speedway, South Boston, Virginia	May 12
5	Who's Your Driver Twin 100s	South Boston Speedway, South Boston, Virginia	May 12
6	Memphis 150 presented by AutoZone	Memphis International Raceway, Millington, Tennessee	June 2
7	JustDrive.com 125	New Jersey Motorsports Park, Millville, New Jersey	June 16
8	King Cadillac GMC Throwback 100	Thompson Speedway Motorsports Park, Thompson, Connecticut	July 14
9	United Site Services 70	New Hampshire Motor Speedway, Loudon, New Hampshire	July 21
10	Casey's General Store 150 (Note: The Casey's General Store 150 was held as a combined event, with competitors from the K&N Pro Series East competing along with competitors for the K&N Pro Series West. Drivers received points and statistical credit relative to the whole field in general, instead of relative to other drivers in their series. Also drivers were allowed to score points for both the East and West Series.)	Iowa Speedway, Newton, Iowa	July 27
11	Great Outdoors RV Superstore 100	Watkins Glen International, Watkins Glen, New York	August 3
12	Monaco Cocktails Gateway Classic 125 (Note: The Monaco Cocktails Gateway Classic 125 was held as a combined event, with competitors from the K&N Pro Series East competing along with competitors for the K&N Pro Series West. Drivers received points and statistical credit relative to the whole field in general, instead of relative to other drivers in their series. Also drivers were allowed to score points for both the East and West Series.)	Gateway Motorsports Park, Madison, Illinois	August 24
13	Apple Barrel 125	New Hampshire Motor Speedway, Loudon, New Hampshire	September 22
14	Crosley 125	Dover International Speedway, Dover, Delaware	October 6 (Note: The Crosley 125 was postponed a day due to inclement weather.)

== Results and standings ==
=== Races ===
No.	Race	Pole position	Most laps led	Winning driver	Manufacturer	No.	Winning team
1	New Smyrna 175	Harrison Burton	Todd Gilliland	Todd Gilliland	Toyota	54	DGR-Crosley
2	Zombie Auto 150	Noah Gragson	Todd Gilliland	Todd Gilliland	Toyota	98	DGR-Crosley
3	Visit Hampton VA 150	Tyler Dippel	Anthony Alfredo	Tyler Dippel	Toyota	54	DGR-Crosley
4	Who's Your Driver Twin 100s	Grant Quinlan	Tyler Ankrum	Tyler Ankrum	Toyota	17	DGR-Crosley
5	Who's Your Driver Twin 100s	Anthony Alfredo^{1}	Grant Quinlan	Anthony Alfredo	Toyota	40	MDM Motorsports
6	Memphis 150 presented by AutoZone	Tyler Ankrum	Tyler Ankrum	Rubén García Jr.	Toyota	6	Rev Racing
7	JustDrive.com 125	Ernie Francis Jr.	Will Rodgers	Will Rodgers	Ford	27	Jefferson Pitts Racing
8	King Cadillac GMC Throwback 100	Spencer Davis	Spencer Davis	Tyler Ankrum	Toyota	17	DGR-Crosley
9	United Site Services 70	Derek Kraus	Tyler Ankrum	Tyler Ankrum	Toyota	17	DGR-Crosley
10	Casey's General Store 150	Tyler Dippel	Tyler Dippel	Tyler Ankrum	Toyota	17	DGR-Crosley
11	Great Outdoors RV Superstore 100	Tyler Ankrum^{2}	Will Rodgers	Brett Moffitt	Toyota	1	Hattori Racing Enterprises
12	Monaco Cocktails Gateway Classic 125	Spencer Davis^{3}	Derek Kraus	Derek Kraus	Toyota	16	Bill McAnally Racing
13	Apple Barrel 125	Derek Kraus	Brandon McReynolds	Brandon McReynolds	Chevrolet	74	Visconti Motorsports
14	Crosley 125	Harrison Burton	Rubén García Jr.	Rubén García Jr.	Toyota	6	Rev Racing

Notes

- ^{1} – Starting grid was set by the fastest lap times from the first Who's Your Driver Twin 100 race.
- ^{2} – The qualifying session for the Great Outdoors RV Superstore 100 was cancelled due to weather. The starting line-up was decided by Owners' championship.
- ^{3} – The qualifying session for the Monaco Cocktails Gateway Classic 125 was cancelled due to weather. The starting line-up was decided by Practice results.

=== Drivers' championship ===
(key) Bold – Pole position awarded by time. Italics – Pole position set by final practice results or Owners' points. * – Most laps led.

Pos.	Driver	NSM	BRI	LGY	SBO	SBO	MEM	NJM	THO	NHA	IOW	GLN	GTW	NHA	DOV	Points
1	Tyler Ankrum **(R)**	5	4	3	1*	3	**2***	9	1	1*	1	7	6	13	11	574
2	Tyler Dippel	9	6	**1**	5	2	3	11	3	4	**6***	15	12	12		490
3	Rubén García Jr.	26	10	10	12	15	1	7	9	12	5	8	4	17	1*	489
4	Ronnie Bassett Jr.	8	8	11	6	4	5	3	12	14	16	10	14	9	9	487
5	Anthony Alfredo **(R)**	24	18	2*	15	**1**	9	5	6	3	22	16	9	6	6	480
6	Ryan Vargas **(R)**	12	13	9	16	11	7	6	10	11	7	18	13	14	7	462
7	Chase Cabre	19	26	8	13	10	4	14	5	8	24	14	5	8	8	452
8	Dillon Bassett	25	16	4	17	8	6	15	2	20	12	21	8	5	10	448
9	Spencer Davis	6	7	Wth	8	5	19	Wth	**4***	7	4	4	24	3	15	426
10	Colin Garrett **(R)**			6	3	16	8	8	13	13	23	22	15	7	17	377
11	Brandon McReynolds	10	5	Wth	14	DNS^{1}			7	6				1*	2	295
12	Derek Kraus	4	24				14			**5**	20		1*	**2**	3	287
13	Juan Manuel González **(R)**	18	20	12	7	14	17					23	22	15	16	276
14	Grant Quinlan **(R)**		19	5	**10**	7*	11	4								211
15	Tristan Van Wieringen **(R)**								11	9	14	24	17	11	13	209
16	Cole Rouse	2	21				18			10	8		2			204
17	Harrison Burton	**3**	2							2		9			**5**	200
18	Sam Mayer **(R)**									17	17	5	11	10	4	200
19	Marcos Gomes **(R)**		12	13	4	9	10									173
20	Hailie Deegan **(R)**	29	22				13			16	21		23			142
21	Chuck Buchanan Jr.	21	28	Wth	9	12							21			129
22	Todd Gilliland	1*	1*												14	127
23	Will Rodgers							1*				2*	26			110
24	Justin Carroll			15	2	6										109
25	Connor Hall **(R)**			7	11	13										101
26	J. P. Morgan	13					12						18			89
27	Kody Vanderwal	11									19		16			86
28	Ernie Francis Jr. **(R)**							**2**				11		Wth		76
29	Salvatore Iovino	28	17	14												73
30	Matt Levin	20	25								18					69
31	Noah Gragson		**3**									20				67
32	Dale Quarterley							13				13				62
33	Reid Lanpher **(R)**		11							15						61
34	Brandon Oakley **(R)**	14	14													60
35	Trey Hutchens						15			18					Wth	55
36	Abraham Calderón **(R)**	16								19						53
37	Brett Moffitt											1				47
38	Bill Hoff							16	Wth			DNS^{1}		Wth		47
39	Scott Heckert											3				41
40	Riley Herbst													4		41
41	Jesse Iwuji	22	27								25^{2}					39
42	Bubba Wallace											6				38
43	Anthony Sergi **(R)**	7														37
44	Chase Dowling **(R)**								8							36
45	Eddie MacDonald		9													35
46	Cole Keatts **(R)**							10								34
47	Kyle Benjamin										10					34
48	David Levine							12								32
49	Austin Hill											12				32
50	Devin Dodson **(R)**										11^{2}				12	32
51	Joe Graf Jr. **(R)**	15														29
52	Max Tullman **(R)**		15													29
53	Armani Williams **(R)**						16									28
54	Thomas Ferrando **(R)**													16		28
55	Jimmy Zacharias **(R)**	17	Wth													27
56	Robert Pawlowski **(R)**											17				27
57	Erik Jones											19				26
58	Andrew Tuttle **(R)**	23														21
59	Tanner Thorson **(R)**		23													21
60	John Wood	27		Wth												17
Drivers ineligible for K&N Pro Series East points
	Derek Thorn										2		3			
	Ryan Partridge										3		10			
	Trevor Huddleston **(R)**										9		7			
	Bill Kann										13		19			
	Takuma Koga										15		20			
	Andrew Engberson **(R)**												25			
Pos.	Driver	NSM	BRI	LGY	SBO	SBO	MEM	NJM	THO	NHA	IOW	GLN	GTW	NHA	DOV	Points

Notes

- ^{1} – Bill Hoff and Brandon McReynolds received championship points, despite the fact that they did not start the race.
- ^{2} – Scored points towards the K&N Pro Series West.

== See also ==
- 2018 Monster Energy NASCAR Cup Series
- 2018 NASCAR Xfinity Series
- 2018 NASCAR Camping World Truck Series
- 2018 NASCAR K&N Pro Series West
- 2018 NASCAR Whelen Modified Tour
- 2018 NASCAR Pinty's Series
- 2018 NASCAR PEAK Mexico Series
- 2018 NASCAR Whelen Euro Series
- 2018 CARS Tour
