= J. P. Morgan (racing driver) =

American racing driver (born 1976)

- Born: January 31, 1976 (age 50); Ether, North Carolina, U.S.

ARCA Menards Series East career
- 17 races run over 6 years
- Best finish: 18th (2017)
- First race: 2003 Mohegan Sun 150 Presented by Pepsi (Watkins Glen)
- Last race: 2018 Monaco Gateway Classic (Gateway)
Wins	Top tens	Poles
0	1	0
- Statistics up to date as of November 23, 2024.

J. P. Morgan (born January 31, 1976) is an American professional stock car racing driver who has competed in the NASCAR K&N Pro Series East from 2013 to 2018.

Morgan has also competed in the X-1R Pro Cup Series.

== Motorsports results ==
=== NASCAR ===
(key) (Bold - Pole position awarded by qualifying time. Italics - Pole position earned by points standings or practice time. * – Most laps led.)

==== K&N Pro Series East ====
NASCAR K&N Pro Series East results
Year	Team	No.	Make	1	2	3	4	5	6	7	8	9	10	11	12	13	14	15	16	17	NKNPSEC	Pts	Ref
2003	N/A	1	Chevy	LEE	STA	ERI	BEE	STA	HOL	TMP	NHA	WFD	SEE	GLN; 17	ADI	BEE	THU	NHA; 23	STA	LRP; 33	44th	270	
2014	J. P. Morgan	23	Chevy	NSM	DAY	BRI	GRE	RCH	IOW	BGS	FIF	LGY	NHA	COL	IOW	GLN; Wth	VIR	GRE	DOV; Wth		67th	18	
2015	J. P. Morgan	23	Chevy	NSM; 22	GRE; 23	BRI	IOW	BGS	LGY; 18	COL	NHA	IOW	GLN	MOT; 12	VIR	RCH; 23	DOV				26th	122	
2016	J. P. Morgan	23	Chevy	NSM	MOB	GRE	BRI	VIR; 10	DOM	STA	COL	NHA	IOW	GLN	GRE	NJM	DOV				49th	34	
2017	J. P. Morgan	23	Chevy	NSM; INQ	GRE; 19	BRI; 26	SBO; 13	SBO; 18	MEM; 11	BLN	TMP	NHA	IOW	GLN	LGY	NJM	DOV				18th	133	
2018	J. P. Morgan	23	Chevy	NSM; 13	BRI	LGY	SBO	SBO	MEM; 12	NJM	THO	NHA	IOW	GLN	GTW; 18	NHA	DOV				26th	89	
