= JustDrive.com 125 =

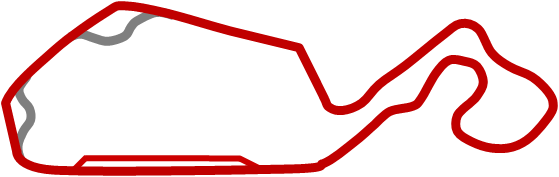

NASCAR K&N Pro Series East
- Venue: New Jersey Motorsports Park
- Location: Millville, New Jersey; United States
- Corporate sponsor: JustDrive.com
- First race: 2016
- Distance: 123.8 miles (199.236 km)
- Laps: 55
- Most wins (driver): Will Rodgers (2)
- Most wins (team): Jefferson Pitts Racing (3)
- Most wins (manufacturer): Ford (3)

Circuit information
- Surface: Asphalt
- Length: 2.25 mi (3.62 km)
- Turns: 12

The JustDrive.com 125 was a NASCAR K&N Pro Series East race held annually at New Jersey Motorsports Park from 2016 to 2018. Will Rodgers won two events, the most of any driver.

== History ==
On December 17, 2015, NJMP announced that it would host a K&N Pro Series East event in 2016; track officials indicated that negotiations had begun with NASCAR as early as 2013. Noah Gragson won the inaugural event. Will Rodgers won the final two editions of the race.

== Past winners ==
Year	Date	No.	Driver	Team	Manufacturer	Race distance		Race time	Average speed (mph)
Year	Date	No.	Driver	Team	Manufacturer	Laps	Miles (km)	Race time	Average speed (mph)
2016	September 17	7	Noah Gragson	Jefferson Pitts Racing	Ford	55	123.8 (199.236)	1:31:43	82.755
2017	September 16	7	Will Rodgers	Jefferson Pitts Racing (2)	Ford (2)	55	123.8 (199.236)	1:38:49	76.809
2018	June 16	7	Will Rodgers (2)	Jefferson Pitts Racing (3)	Ford (3)	55	123.8 (199.236)	1:36:16	78.843
