= Grant Quinlan =

Canadian racecar driver

- Nationality: (Canada) Canadian
- Born: December 4, 1998 (age 27) Maidstone, Ontario, Canada

ARCA Menards Series career
- Debut season: 2018
- Current team: Rette Jones Racing
- Car number: 30
- Engine: Ford
- Crew chief: Mark Rette
- Starts: 3
- Wins: 0
- Poles: 0
- Best finish: 57th in 2019
- Finished last season: 57th (2019)

Previous series
- 2015–2018: ARCA Menards Series East
- Statistics up to date as of January 25, 2020.

Grant Quinlan (born December 4, 1998) is a Canadian professional stock car racing driver. He most recently competed part-time in the ARCA Menards Series in 2018 and 2019, driving the No. 30 Ford for Rette Jones Racing. He has also competed with RJR in what is now the ARCA Menards Series East.

== Racing career ==
Quinlan began racing go-karts at the age of five, and then raced in the ARCA/CRA Super Series, and his successes racing in that series earned him a part-time ride in the K&N Pro Series East with the new Rette Jones Racing No. 30 team in 2015. His first race was at Columbus Motor Speedway, where he surprisingly finished second in his and the team's debut in the series. Quinlan also started third and led 63 laps in that race. He would run two more races that year, coming at New Hampshire and Richmond. With Dominique Van Wieringen in the No. 30 full-time in 2016, Quinlan drove the team's second car, the No. 29, at Stafford. He made one other start that year, driving the No. 02 for Young's Motorsports at Iowa. He finished eighteenth in both of his races in 2016. His only start of 2017 came at the road course of New Jersey Motorsports Park, finishing eighth driving the No. 28 for RJR. For 2018, Rette Jones put Quinlan in their ARCA Racing Series car at Daytona. In the race, Quinlan crashed out and finished 37th. On the K&N side, he ran six of the first seven races of the season in the Rette Jones No. 30 with a best finish of fourth at NJMP. For his second ARCA start, Quinlan returned to the same race and team the following year, where he picked up an impressive third place finish. After his strong run at Daytona, Quinlan and RJR returned to run Talladega, where they would finish ninth.

== Personal life ==
Quinlan is from Maidstone, Ontario and graduated from Essex High School in 2016 where he was an honor roll student.

== Motorsports career results ==
=== NASCAR ===
(key) (Bold – Pole position awarded by qualifying time. Italics – Pole position earned by points standings or practice time. * – Most laps led.)

==== K&N Pro Series East ====
NASCAR K&N Pro Series East results
Year	Team	No.	Make	1	2	3	4	5	6	7	8	9	10	11	12	13	14	NKNPSEC	Pts
2015	Rette Jones Racing	30	Ford	NSM	GRE	BRI	IOW	BGS	LGY	COL; 2	NHA; 15	IOW	GLN	MOT	VIR	RCH; 20	DOV	30th	96
2016	Rette Jones Racing	29	Ford	NSM	MOB	GRE	BRI	VIR	DOM	STA; 18	COL	NHA						41st	52
2016	Young's Motorsports	02	Ford										IOW; 18	GLN	GRE	NJM	DOV	41st	52
2017	Rette Jones Racing	28	Ford	NSM	GRE	BRI	SBO	SBO	MEM	BLN	TMP	NHA	IOW	GLN	LGY	NJE; 8	DOV	48th	36
2018	Rette Jones Racing	30	Ford	NSM	BRI; 19	LGY; 5	**SBO**; 10	SBO; 7*	MEM; 11	NJE; 4	TMP	NHA	IOW	GLN	GTW	NHA	DOV	14th	211

^{*} Season still in progress
^{1} Ineligible for series points

=== ARCA Menards Series ===
(key) (Bold – Pole position awarded by qualifying time. Italics – Pole position earned by points standings or practice time. * – Most laps led.)

ARCA Menards Series results
Year	Team	No.	Make	1	2	3	4	5	6	7	8	9	10	11	12	13	14	15	16	17	18	19	20	AMSC	Pts
2018	Rette Jones Racing	30	Ford	DAY; 37	NSH	SLM	TAL	TOL	CLT	POC	MCH	MAD	GTW	CHI	IOW	ELK	POC	ISF	BLN	DSF	SLM	IRP	KAN	103rd	45
2019	Rette Jones Racing	30	Ford	DAY; 3	FIF	SLM	TAL; 9	NSH	TOL	CLT	POC	MCH	MAD	GTW	CHI	ELK	IOW	POC	ISF	DSF	SLM	IRP	KAN	57th	300
