= Travis Miller (racing driver) =

American racing driver (born 1988)

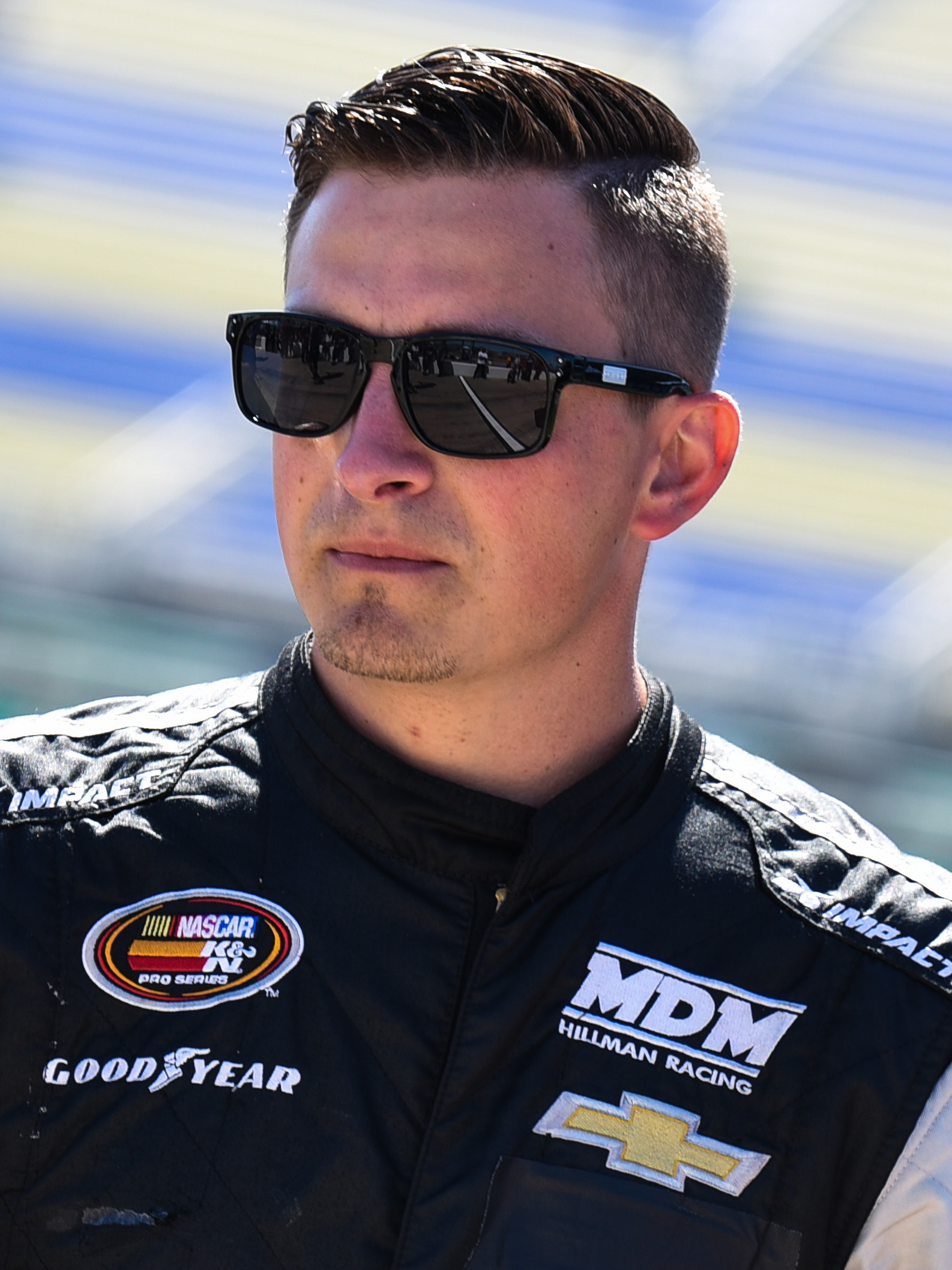
- Miller at Kansas Speedway in 2017
- Born: April 13, 1988 (age 38); Chesapeake, Virginia, U.S.

NASCAR FedEx Freight Truck Series career
- 5 races run over 2 years
- 2017 position: 70th
- Best finish: 49th (2012)
- First race: 2012 American Ethanol 200 (Iowa)
- Last race: 2017 Toyota Tundra 250 (Kansas)
Wins	Top tens	Poles
0	0	0

Travis Miller (born April 13, 1988) is an American former professional stock car racing driver. He last competed part-time in the NASCAR Camping World Truck Series, driving the No. 99 Chevrolet Silverado for MDM Motorsports.

== Motorsports career results ==
=== NASCAR ===
(key) (Bold – Pole position awarded by qualifying time. Italics – Pole position earned by points standings or practice time. * – Most laps led.)

==== Camping World Truck Series ====
NASCAR Camping World Truck Series results
Year	Team	No.	Make	1	2	3	4	5	6	7	8	9	10	11	12	13	14	15	16	17	18	19	20	21	22	23	NCWTC	Pts	Ref
2012	Hillman Racing	27	Chevy	DAY	MAR	CAR	KAN	CLT	DOV	TEX	KEN	IOW; 31	CHI	POC	MCH	BRI	ATL	IOW	KEN; 24	LVS; 26	TAL	MAR	TEX	PHO			49th	51	
2012	Hillman Racing	25	Chevy																						HOM; 26		49th	51	
2017	MDM Motorsports	99	Chevy	DAY	ATL	MAR	KAN; 25	CLT	DOV	TEX	GTW	IOW	KEN	ELD	POC	MCH	BRI	MSP	CHI	NHA	LVS	TAL	MAR	TEX	PHO	HOM	70th	12	

==== K&N Pro Series East ====
NASCAR K&N Pro Series East results
Year	Team	No.	Make	1	2	3	4	5	6	7	8	9	10	11	12	13	14	NKNPSEC	Pts	Ref
2012	X Team Racing	16	Toyota	BRI	GRE	RCH	IOW; 16	BGS	JFC	LGY	CNB	COL						42nd	59	
2012	X Team Racing	15	Toyota										IOW; 13	NHA	DOV	GRE	CAR	42nd	59	
2015	Ranier Racing with MDM	40	Chevy	NSM; 26	GRE; 22	BRI; 14	IOW; 22	BGS	LGY	COL	NHA; 28	IOW; 15	GLN	MOT	VIR	RCH; 25	DOV; 14	19th	186	
2017	MDM Motorsports	40	Toyota	NSM	GRE	BRI	SBO; 1*	SBO; 6	MEM; 3	BLN; 12	TMP	NHA	IOW	GLN	LGY	NJM	DOV	15th	159	

==== K&N Pro Series West ====
NASCAR K&N Pro Series West results
Year	Team	No.	Make	1	2	3	4	5	6	7	8	9	10	11	12	13	NKNPSWC	Pts	Ref
2015	Ranier Racing with MDM	40	Chevy	KCR	IRW	TUS	IOW	SHA	SON	SLS	IOW	EVG	CNS	MER	AAS	PHO; 7	45th	37	

=== ARCA Racing Series ===
(key) (Bold – Pole position awarded by qualifying time. Italics – Pole position earned by points standings or practice time. * – Most laps led.)

ARCA Racing Series results
Year	Team	No.	Make	1	2	3	4	5	6	7	8	9	10	11	12	13	14	15	16	17	18	19	20	ARSC	Pts	Ref
2016	Ranier Racing with MDM	8	Chevy	DAY	NSH	SLM	TAL	TOL	NJM	POC	MCH	MAD	WIN	IOW	IRP; 2	POC	BLN	ISF	DSF	SLM	CHI	KEN	KAN	87th	225	
2017	MDM Motorsports	28	Chevy	DAY	NSH	SLM; 10	TAL	TOL	ELK	POC	MCH	MAD	IOW	IRP	POC	WIN	ISF	ROA	DSF	SLM	CHI	KEN	KAN	82nd	185	
