= 2017 NASCAR K&N Pro Series East =

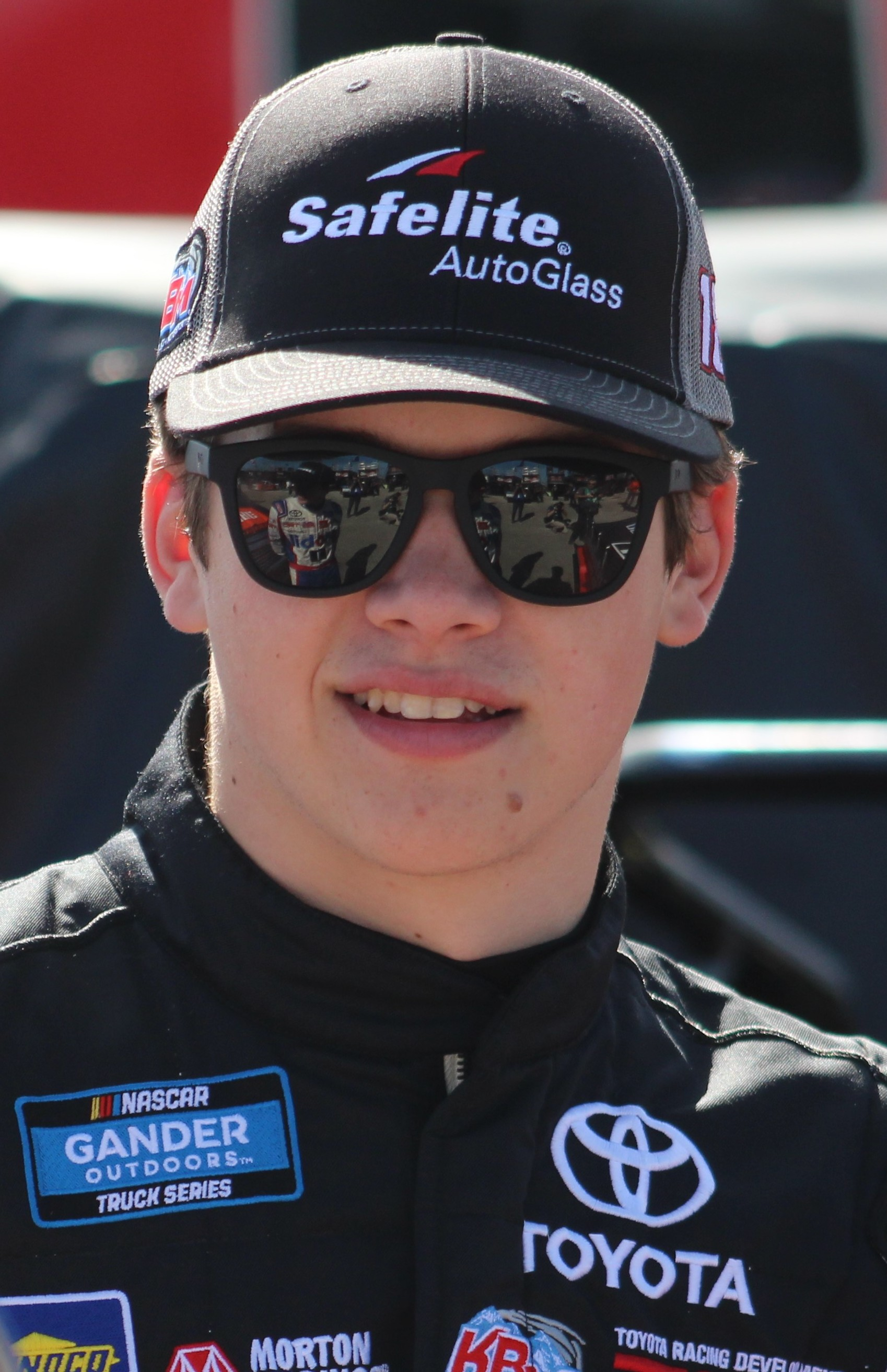
Harrison Burton, the 2017 K&N Pro Series East champion.

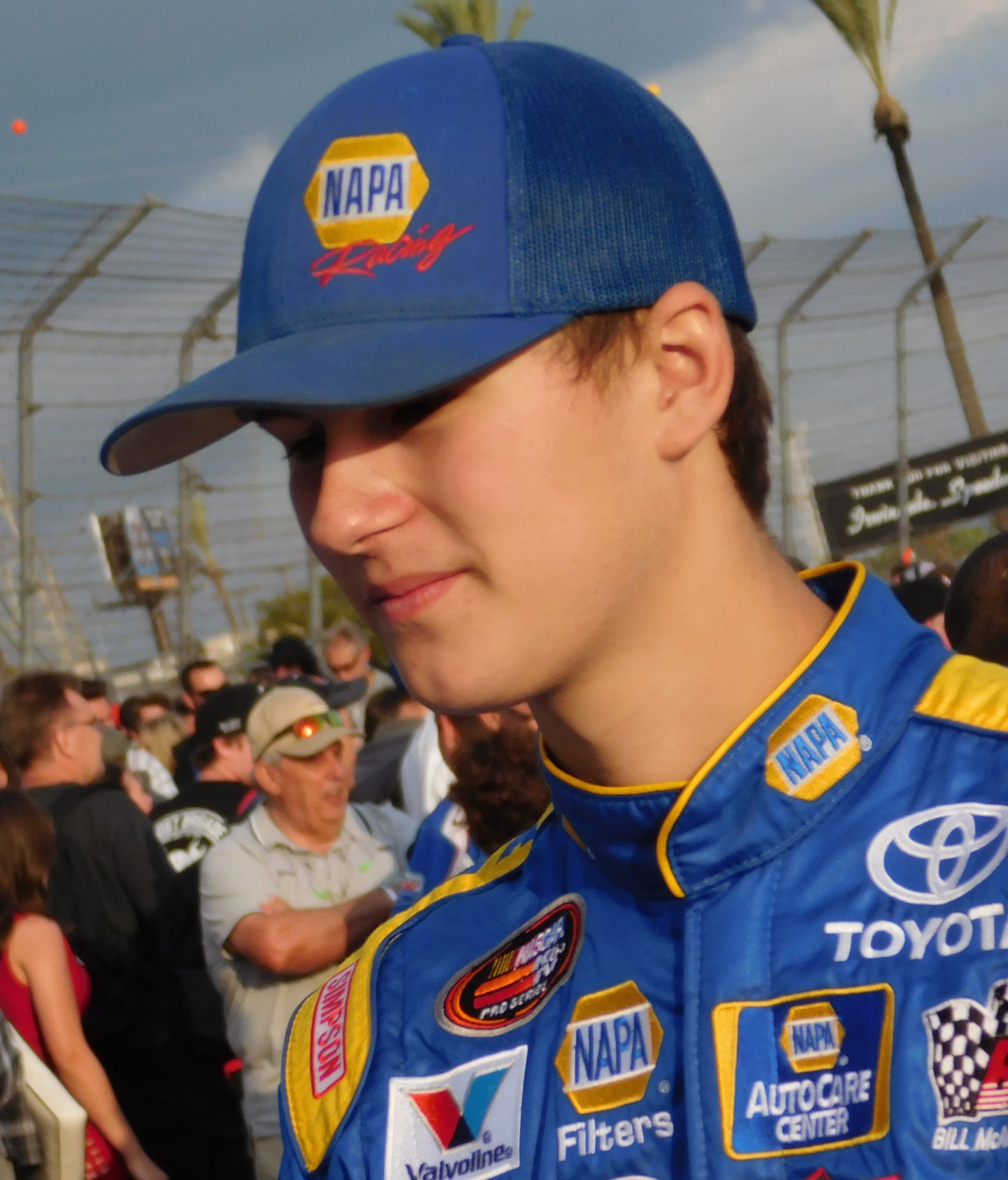
Todd Gilliland finished second behind Burton by just 8 points. Gilliland also was the 2017 West Series champion, almost winning both titles in the same year.

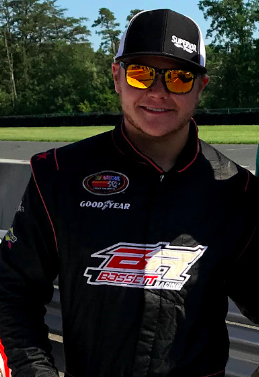
Ronnie Bassett Jr. finished third in the championship.

The 2017 NASCAR K&N Pro Series East was the 31st season of the K&N Pro Series East, a regional stock car racing series sanctioned by NASCAR. It began with the Jet Tools 150 at New Smyrna Speedway on February 19 and concluded with the National Fallen Firefighters Foundation 125 presented by Carl Deputy & Son Builders at Dover International Speedway on September 29. Justin Haley was the defending Drivers' Champion. Harrison Burton won the championship, eight points in front of Todd Gilliland.

== Drivers ==
No.	Manufacturer	Car Owner	Race Driver	Crew Chief
1	Toyota	Kevin Manion	Ben Kennedy 1	Chris Carrier
2	Toyota	Max Siegel	Collin Cabre	Matt Bucher
04	Chevrolet 12	Ronnie Bassett	Ronnie Bassett Jr.	Kris Bowen
04	Toyota 2	Ronnie Bassett	Ronnie Bassett Jr.	Kris Bowen
4	Toyota	Max Siegel	Chase Cabre (R) (Note: Chase Cabre drove in the Busch North Throwback 100 with car number 6, because of the paint scheme honoring Tommy Houston.)	Mark Green
5	Chevrolet	Troy Williams	Luis Rodriguez Jr. (R) 3	Troy Williams 1
5	Chevrolet	Troy Williams	Luis Rodriguez Jr. (R) 3	J. R. Norris 1
5	Chevrolet	Troy Williams	Luis Rodriguez Jr. (R) 3	Don Roberts 1
6	Toyota	Max Siegel	Rubén García Jr. (Note: Rubén García Jr. drove in the Busch North Throwback 100 with car number 03, because of the paint scheme honoring Rogelio López.)	Steve Plattenberger
7	Ford	Jeff Jefferson	Will Rodgers (R) 2	Jeff Jefferson
9	Chevrolet 5 Ford 4	Troy Williams	Enrique Baca (R) 7 (Note: Enrique Baca drove in the Finger Lakes Wine Country 100 with car number 5.)	Bryan Quanz 2 Teddy Brown 5 Beau Whitley 2
9	Chevrolet 5 Ford 4	Troy Williams	Brandon Lynn (R) 1	Bryan Quanz 2 Teddy Brown 5 Beau Whitley 2
9	Chevrolet 5 Ford 4	Troy Williams	Woody Pitkat (R) 1	Bryan Quanz 2 Teddy Brown 5 Beau Whitley 2
11	Toyota	Shigeaki Hattori	Ryan Truex 2 (Note: Ryan Truex drove in the Finger Lakes Wine Country 100 with car number 01.)	Scott Zipadelli 1 Fuz Burgdoff 2
11	Toyota	Shigeaki Hattori	Jesse Little 1 (Note: Jesse Little drove in the Casey's General Store 150 presented by Vatterott College with car number 01.)	Scott Zipadelli 1 Fuz Burgdoff 2
12	Toyota	Matthew Miller	Harrison Burton	Mardy Lindley
13	Chevrolet 7 Toyota 6	Eric McClure	Hunter Baize 9	Teddy Brown 1 Chris Carrier 4 Rick Ren II 3 Matt Weber 5
13	Chevrolet 7 Toyota 6	Eric McClure	Spencer Davis 1	Teddy Brown 1 Chris Carrier 4 Rick Ren II 3 Matt Weber 5
13	Chevrolet 7 Toyota 6	Eric McClure	Jeff Green 2	Teddy Brown 1 Chris Carrier 4 Rick Ren II 3 Matt Weber 5
13	Chevrolet 7 Toyota 6	Eric McClure	Max Papis 1	Teddy Brown 1 Chris Carrier 4 Rick Ren II 3 Matt Weber 5
14	Chevrolet	Bobby Hutchens	Trey Hutchens 7	Bobby Hutchens Jr.
16	Toyota	Mike Curb	Todd Gilliland	Chris Lawson
17	Toyota	David Gilliland	Chase Purdy (R)	Cully Barclay
18	Toyota	Sam Hunt	Sam Hunt 2	Ron Otto 3 H. C. Sellers 1
18	Toyota	Sam Hunt	Peyton Sellers (R) 2	Ron Otto 3 H. C. Sellers 1
19	Ford 1	Chuck Buchanan	Chuck Buchanan Jr. 8	Craig Wood
19	Chevrolet 7	Chuck Buchanan	Chuck Buchanan Jr. 8	Craig Wood
20	Toyota	Ben Kennedy	Anthony Sergi (R) 1	Sam Roebuck
22	Chevrolet	Richard Bodmer	Rich Bodmer (R) 1	Steve Visich
23	Chevrolet	J. P. Morgan	Caleb Holman 1	James Beck
23	Chevrolet	J. P. Morgan	J. P. Morgan 5	James Beck
25	Chevrolet 1	Jen Brown	David Levine (R) 1	Teddy Brown
25	Toyota 1	Jen Brown	Enrique Baca (R) 1	Teddy Brown
27	Toyota 1	Jerry Pitts	Matt Tifft 1	Jerry Pitts
27	Ford 1	Jerry Pitts	Max Tullman (R) 1	Jerry Pitts
28	Ford	Logan Yiengst	Dylan Murry (R) 2	Logan Yiengst 1
28	Ford	Logan Yiengst	Dylan Murry (R) 2	Chad Kendrick 1
28	Ford	Logan Yiengst	Grant Quinlan 1	Matt Noyce 1
30	Ford	Mark Rette	Tyler Dippel 13	Mark Rette 13
30	Ford	Mark Rette	Dominique Van Wieringen 1	Logan Yiengst 1
31	Chevrolet	Ted Marsh	Travis Cope (R) 1	Todd Fisette
31	Chevrolet	Ted Marsh	Matt Bowling (R) 2	Todd Fisette
31	Chevrolet	Ted Marsh	Ryan Preece 1	Todd Fisette
31	Chevrolet	Ted Marsh	Andy Seuss (R) 1	Todd Fisette
31	Chevrolet	Ted Marsh	Scott Heckert 1	Todd Fisette
32	Ford 3	Susan McCarty 3	Noel Dowler (R) 1	Sue McCarty 1
32	Ford 3	Susan McCarty 3	Ray Parent (R) 1	Dave Lessard 1
32	Ford 3	Susan McCarty 3	Stafford Smith 1	Sonny Wahl 1
32	Chevrolet 1	Dale Quarterley 1	Robert Pawlowski (R) 1	Dale Quarterley 1
34	Ford	Jesse Iwuji	Andrew Engberson (R) 2	Adan Alvarado 1
34	Ford	Jesse Iwuji	Andrew Engberson (R) 2	Brandon Wilkenson 1
36	Chevrolet	Shawne Merriman	Jesse Iwuji 3	John Wood 1
36	Chevrolet	Shawne Merriman	Jesse Iwuji 3	Kevin McCarty 2
36	Chevrolet	Shawne Merriman	Stafford Smith 2	Sonny Wahl 1
36	Chevrolet	Shawne Merriman	Stafford Smith 2	Mike Holleran 1
38	Chevrolet	Mike Holleran	Salvatore Iovino 2	Sonny Wahl 3 Mike Holleran 3
38	Chevrolet	Mike Holleran	John Wood 4	Sonny Wahl 3 Mike Holleran 3
39	Toyota	Hal Martin	Amber Balcaen (R) 1	Doug Chouinard 1
39	Toyota	Hal Martin	Chad Finchum 1	Rick Ren II 1
39	Toyota	Hal Martin	Jared Irvan (R) 1 (Note: Jared Irvan drove in the Busch North Throwback 100 with car number 4, because of the paint scheme honoring his father Ernie Irvan.)	Chris Carrier 1
40	Toyota 11	Mark McFarland	Sheldon Creed (R) 4	Doug Howe 9 Mark McFarland 1 Jamie Jones 1 Jeff Stankiewicz 1
40	Toyota 11	Mark McFarland	Kyle Benjamin 1	Doug Howe 9 Mark McFarland 1 Jamie Jones 1 Jeff Stankiewicz 1
40	Toyota 11	Mark McFarland	Travis Miller 5	Doug Howe 9 Mark McFarland 1 Jamie Jones 1 Jeff Stankiewicz 1
40	Toyota 11	Mark McFarland	Vinnie Miller (R) 1 (Note: Vinnie Miller drove in the Casey's General Store 150 presented by Vatterott College with car number 41.)	Doug Howe 9 Mark McFarland 1 Jamie Jones 1 Jeff Stankiewicz 1
40	Chevrolet 1	Mark McFarland	Brandon Jones 1	Doug Howe 9 Mark McFarland 1 Jamie Jones 1 Jeff Stankiewicz 1
41	Toyota	Douglas Fuller	Vinnie Miller (R) 5	Jamie Jones
41	Toyota	Douglas Fuller	Riley Herbst 1	Jamie Jones
42	Toyota	Max Siegel	Jay Beasley	Johnny Allen
43	Toyota	David Calabrese	Zane Smith (R) 2	Bruce Cook 2
43	Toyota	David Calabrese	Doug Coby (R) 1	Ron Otto 3
43	Toyota	David Calabrese	Gary Klutt (R) 1	Ron Otto 3
43	Toyota	David Calabrese	David Calabrese (R) 1	Ron Otto 3
44	Ford 6	Ronnie Bassett	Dillon Bassett	Skip Eyler
44	Chevrolet 8	Ronnie Bassett	Dillon Bassett	Skip Eyler
49	Ford	Zeno Marshall Jr.	John Holleman IV 3	Kevin Hollenbach 2
49	Ford	Zeno Marshall Jr.	John Holleman IV 3	Corey LaJoie 1
51	Ford	Thomas Oakley	Brandon Oakley (R) 2	Tony Ponkauskas
54	Toyota	Bill McAnally	Riley Herbst 1	Shannon Rursch
55	Ford	Dione Jefferson	Hanna Zellers (R) 1	Jason Jefferson
66	Chevrolet	Barry Wilson	Reid Wilson (R) 4	Andrew Abbott
71	Chevrolet	Rob Grimm	Eddie MacDonald 4	Rollie Lachance Jr. 3
71	Chevrolet	Rob Grimm	Eddie MacDonald 4	Rob Grimm 1
88	Ford	Troy Cline	Julia Landauer 2	Doug Chouinard
91	Toyota	Terry Carroll	Justin Carroll (R) 1	Mark Setzer
96	Toyota	Ben Kennedy	Spencer Davis 2	Mike Fritts
97	Toyota	Jason Little	Jesse Little 1	Jason Little
99	Toyota	Bill McAnally	Derek Kraus (R) 1	Ty Joiner

== Schedule ==
All of the races in the 2017 season - with the exception of the JustDrive.com 125 - were televised on NBCSN and were on a tape delay basis.

No.	Race title	Track	Date
1	Jet Tools 150	New Smyrna Speedway, New Smyrna Beach, Florida	February 19
2	Kevin Whitaker Chevrolet 150	Greenville-Pickens Speedway, Greenville, South Carolina	April 8
3	Zombie Auto 125	Bristol Motor Speedway, Bristol, Tennessee	April 22
4	WhosYourDriver.org Twin 100s	South Boston Speedway, South Boston, Virginia	May 6
5	WhosYourDriver.org Twin 100s	South Boston Speedway, South Boston, Virginia	May 6
6	Memphis 125 presented by AutoZone	Memphis International Raceway, Millington, Tennessee	June 3
7	Stars & Stripes 150	Berlin Raceway, Marne, Michigan	July 1
8	Busch North Throwback 100	Thompson Speedway Motorsports Park, Thompson, Connecticut	July 8
9	United Site Services 70	New Hampshire Motor Speedway, Loudon, New Hampshire	July 15
10	Casey's General Store 150 presented by Vatterott College (Note: The Casey's General Store 150 presented by Vatterott College was held as a combined event, with competitors from the K&N Pro Series East competing along with competitors for the K&N Pro Series West. Unlike in previous years, drivers received points and statistical credit relative to the whole field in general, instead of relative to other drivers in their series. Also drivers were allowed to score points for both the East and West Series.)	Iowa Speedway, Newton, Iowa	July 28
11	Finger Lakes Wine Country 100	Watkins Glen International, Watkins Glen, New York	August 4
12	Visit Hampton Virginia 150	Langley Speedway, Hampton, Virginia	September 4 (Note: The Visit Hampton Virginia 150 was postponed two days due to expected persistent rain.)
13	JustDrive.com 125	New Jersey Motorsports Park, Millville, New Jersey	September 16
14	National Fallen Firefighters Foundation 125 presented by Carl Deputy & Son Builders	Dover International Speedway, Dover, Delaware	September 29

== Results and standings ==
=== Races ===
No.	Race	Pole position	Most laps led	Winning driver	Manufacturer
1	Jet Tools 150	Harrison Burton	Dillon Bassett	Ronnie Bassett Jr.	Chevrolet
2	Kevin Whitaker Chevrolet 150	Kyle Benjamin	Dillon Bassett	Kyle Benjamin	Toyota
3	Zombie Auto 125	Harrison Burton^{1}	Harrison Burton	Harrison Burton	Toyota
4	WhosYourDriver.org Twin 100s	Chase Cabre	Travis Miller	Travis Miller	Toyota
5	WhosYourDriver.org Twin 100s	Chase Cabre^{2}	Chase Purdy	Harrison Burton	Toyota
6	Memphis 125 presented by AutoZone	Chase Purdy	Chase Purdy	Harrison Burton	Toyota
7	Stars & Stripes 150	Chase Purdy	Hunter Baize	Todd Gilliland	Toyota
8	Busch North Throwback 100	Chase Purdy	Todd Gilliland	Harrison Burton	Toyota
9	United Site Services 70	Chase Purdy	Todd Gilliland	Todd Gilliland	Toyota
10	Casey's General Store 150 presented by Vatterott College	Derek Kraus	Todd Gilliland	Todd Gilliland	Toyota
11	Finger Lakes Wine Country 100	Ryan Truex	Ryan Truex	Will Rodgers	Ford
12	Visit Hampton Virginia 150	Todd Gilliland	Dillon Bassett	Todd Gilliland	Toyota
13	JustDrive.com 125	Collin Cabre	Will Rodgers	Will Rodgers	Ford
14	National Fallen Firefighters Foundation 125 presented by Carl Deputy & Son Builders	Collin Cabre	Rubén García Jr.	Harrison Burton	Toyota

Notes

- ^{1} – The qualifying session for the Zombie Auto 125 was cancelled due to weather. The starting line-up was decided by Owners' championship.
- ^{2} – Starting grid was set by the fastest lap times from the first WhosYourDriver.org Twin 100 race.

=== Drivers' championship ===
(key) Bold – Pole position awarded by time. Italics – Pole position set by final practice results or Owners' points. * – Most laps led.

Pos	Driver	NSM	GRE	BRI	SBO	SBO	MEM	BLN	THO	NHA	IOW	GLN	LGY	NJM	DOV	Points
1	Harrison Burton	**4**	4	1*	5	1	1	6	1	4	4	3	7	3	1	593
2	Todd Gilliland	9	3	8	3	2	8	1	2*	1*	1*	2	**1**	2	13	585
3	Ronnie Bassett Jr.	1	2	22	15	14	4	5	3	3	9	6	4	5	9	518
4	Chase Purdy **(R)**	8	11	12	2	11*	**13***	**2**	**7**	**2**	2	15	2	6	15	515
5	Rubén García Jr.	16	9	2	6	5	14	8	8	7	12	4	6	10	10*	501
6	Chase Cabre **(R)**	12	13	19	**7**	**4**	2	3	10	16	5	7	11	13	11	485
7	Jay Beasley	18	14	14	8	10	5	4	9	14	16	5	8	4	5	482
8	Dillon Bassett	24*	8*	21	4	13	9	17	5	8	20	9	13*	7	14	450
9	Collin Cabre	22	17	6	11	16	7	10	17	11	14	16	5	**15**	**8**	444
10	Tyler Dippel	23	5	13	16	12	12	7	20	6	13	12		11	3	420
11	Hunter Baize	7	7	4	17	7	6	11*	12						Wth	283
12	Enrique Baca **(R)**	26	15		14	9		9	14			20			6	239
13	Vinnie Miller **(R)**	13		16	10	3				21	26					175
14	Trey Hutchens	15	Wth	17			10			9	30				12	171
15	Travis Miller				1*	6	3	12	Wth							159
16	Eddie MacDonald			10					13	12					2	139
17	Sheldon Creed **(R)**	19		11						5					4	138
18	J. P. Morgan	INQ^{1}	19	26	13	18	11									133
19	Reid Wilson **(R)**	6	10	20							15					125
20	Chuck Buchanan Jr.	Wth		Wth	18	17	15	Wth					14		Wth	112
21	Spencer Davis	10		3						15						104
22	Will Rodgers **(R)**										8^{3}	1		1*		95
23	John Wood							14	18	19	32					93
24	Stafford Smith							15	16	17	24^{3}					84
25	Zane Smith **(R)**	2		9												77
26	Dylan Murry **(R)**		6									8				74
27	Peyton Sellers **(R)**				9	8										71
28	Luis Rodriguez Jr. **(R)**	27	12	24												69
29	Jesse Iwuji	21								18	31					62
30	Julia Landauer			7						20	17^{3}					61
31	Sam Hunt			18									9			61
32	Matt Bowling **(R)**				12	15										61
33	Andrew Engberson **(R)**							13	19							56
34	Jesse Little			23							10					55
35	Brandon Oakley **(R)**									10	25					53
36	Salvatore Iovino	17	18													53
37	Kyle Benjamin		**1**													47
38	John Holleman IV	25	16	Wth												47
39	Ryan Truex			25								**19***				46
40	Derek Kraus **(R)**	3									**11**^{3}					41
41	Dominique Van Wieringen												3			41
42	Doug Coby **(R)**								4							40
43	Travis Cope **(R)**	5														39
44	Chad Finchum			5												39
45	Ryan Preece								6							38
46	Ben Kennedy										7					38
47	Riley Herbst			Wth											7	37
48	Grant Quinlan													8		36
49	Max Tullman **(R)**													9		35
50	Matt Tifft											10				34
51	Justin Carroll **(R)**												10			34
52	Caleb Holman	11														33
53	Jared Irvan **(R)**								11							33
54	Brandon Jones											11				33
55	David Calabrese **(R)**												12			32
56	Hanna Zellers **(R)**													12		32
57	Andy Seuss **(R)**									13						31
58	Gary Klutt **(R)**											13				31
59	Anthony Sergi **(R)**	14														30
60	Robert Pawlowski **(R)**											14				30
61	David Levine **(R)**													14		30
62	Brandon Lynn **(R)**			15												29
63	Ray Parent **(R)**								15							29
64	Noel Dowler **(R)**							16								28
65	Rich Bodmer **(R)**													16		28
66	Scott Heckert											17				27
67	Max Papis											18				26
68	Amber Balcaen **(R)**	20														24
69	Jeff Green										22		Wth			22
70	Woody Pitkat **(R)**									DNQ^{2}						22
Drivers ineligible for K&N Pro Series East points
	Chris Eggleston										3					
	Michael Self										6					
	Todd Souza										18					
	Matt Levin										19					
	Blaine Perkins										21					
	Ron Norman										23					
	Nicole Behar										27					
	Bill Kann										28					
	Takuma Koga										29					
	Bryant Barnhill **(R)**										33					
	Kody Vanderwal **(R)**										34					
Pos	Driver	NSM	GRE	BRI	SBO	SBO	MEM	BLN	THO	NHA	IOW	GLN	LGY	NJM	DOV	Points

Notes

- ^{1} – J. P. Morgan got ill after Qualifying of the Jet Tools 150 and one hour before the race the team put Caleb Holman in the car.
- ^{2} – Woody Pitkat received championship points, despite the fact that he did not qualify for the race.
- ^{3} – Scored points towards the K&N Pro Series West.

== See also ==
- 2017 Monster Energy NASCAR Cup Series
- 2017 NASCAR Xfinity Series
- 2017 NASCAR Camping World Truck Series
- 2017 NASCAR K&N Pro Series West
- 2017 NASCAR Whelen Modified Tour
- 2017 NASCAR Pinty's Series
- 2017 NASCAR PEAK Mexico Series
- 2017 NASCAR Whelen Euro Series
