= Salvatore Iovino =

Stock car driver

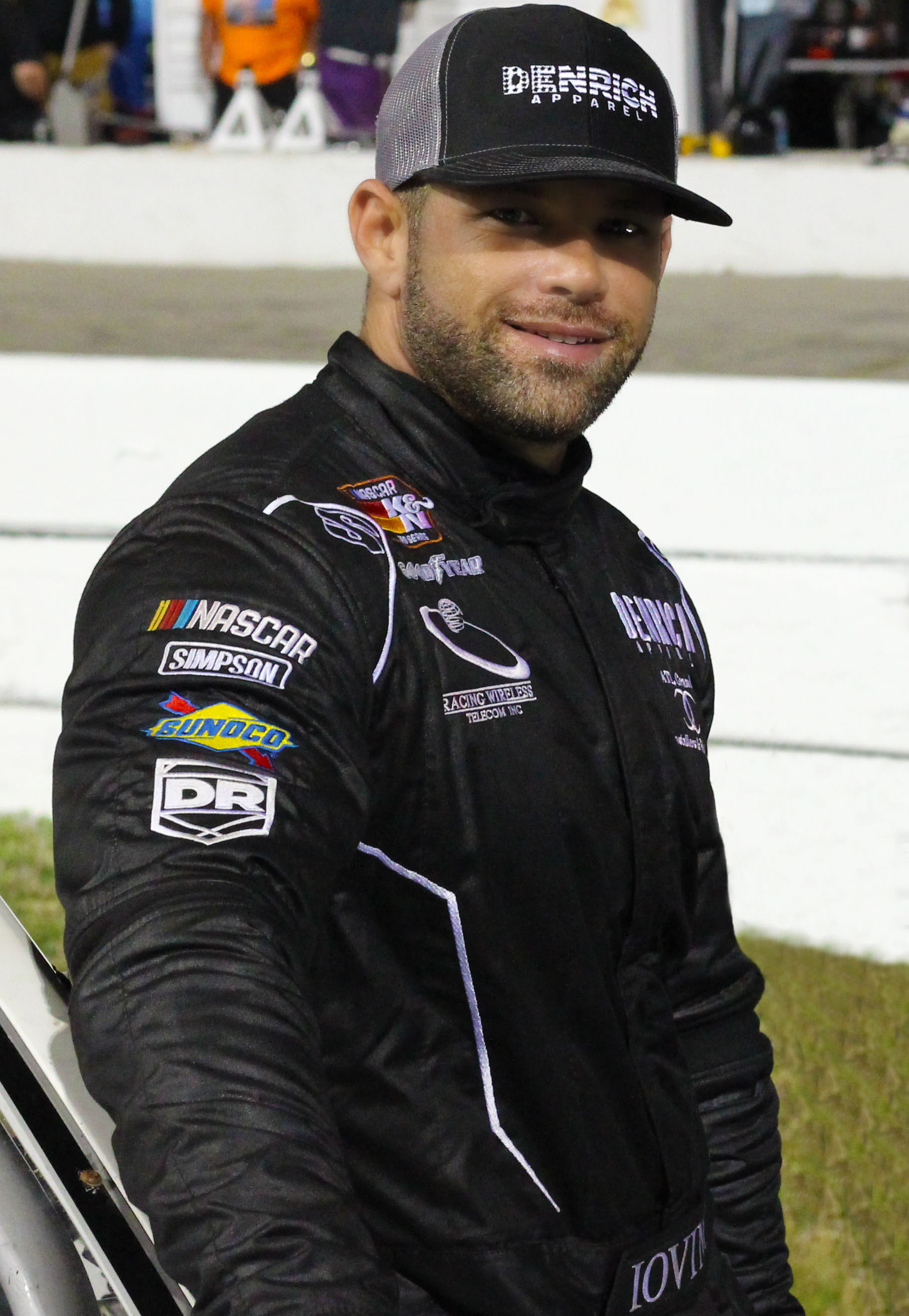
- Iovino at New Smyrna Speedway in 2018
- Nationality: American
- Born: July 15, 1983 (age 43) Phoenix, Arizona, U.S.

NASCAR K&N Pro Series West career
- Debut season: 2016
- Starts: 0
- Championships: 0
- Wins: 0
- Poles: 0

Previous series
- 2017-2018 2018 2016-2018 2016: NASCAR K&N Pro Series East; ARCA Racing Series; All-Whelen Modified Series; NAPA BIG 5 Latemodels; NAPA Super Late Model Series

Awards
- 2016: Most Popular Driver K&N Pro Series West

Salvatore Iovino (born July 15, 1983) is an American professional stock car racing driver. He is also a team owner for Holleran-Iovino Racing (HIR) in the K&N Pro Series East, competing under the Patriot Motorsports Group banner. Prior to competing in stock car racing, he competed as a NHRA drag racing driver. Iovino is a first-generation driver.

== Early life and career ==
Iovino was born in Phoenix, Arizona and raised in Southern California. In 2008, he moved to Georgia, where he owns the Atlanta-based telecommunications company, Integrated Tower Services LLC. The company performs cell tower maintenance, repair and installation.

== Racing career ==
In 2012, Iovino began his racing career competing in the NHRA, driving Pro Stock, Pro Dial, and Super Pro Street Class drag cars. In early 2016, Iovino began stock car racing, starting with the NASCAR All-Whelen Modified’s, NAPA Latemodel Series. In July 2016, he moved into the NASCAR K&N Pro Series starting his first race at the Stateline Speedway in Idaho. After moving to the K&N series, Iovino completed the seven races that were left on the schedule. Despite only completing half the season, Iovino won the honors of Most Popular Driver for the NASCAR K&N Pro West Series in November 2016. On February 19, 2017, Iovino finished seventeenth in his first NASCAR K&N Pro Series East race at New Smyrna.

On March 15, 2017, it was announced that Iovino would drive full-time for Copp Motorsports in the Camping World Truck Series during the 2018 season. The partnership did not work out as family issues derailed him from gaining the permits necessary to compete. Plans on running the full 2018 NASCAR K&N Pro Series East season, with some K&N West and ARCA races being a part of the schedule in 2018, also only resulted in a part-time schedule as he only ran three K&N East races.

== Legal issues ==
On November 7, 2019, Iovino and his wife Melissa were arrested in Kennesaw, Georgia. Charges included two felony counts of unlawfully entering a car with intent to commit a crime, felony cocaine possession, three counts of felony forgery in the third degree, felony card theft, and felony identity theft. Salvatore was released, on bond, on December 28, 2019. He completed all terms of his probation and received early termination. He and his wife, Melissa, have not had contact again with the legal system.

== Motorsports career results ==
=== NASCAR ===
(key) (Bold – Pole position awarded by qualifying time. Italics – Pole position earned by points standings or practice time. * – Most laps led.)

==== K&N Pro Series East ====
NASCAR K&N Pro Series East results
Year	Team	No.	Make	1	2	3	4	5	6	7	8	9	10	11	12	13	14	NKNPSEC	Pts	Ref
2017	Patriot Motorsports Group	38	Chevy	NSM; 17	GRE; 18	BRI	SBO	SBO	MEM	BLN	TMP	NHA	IOW	GLN	LGY	NJM	DOV	36th	53	
2018	Patriot Motorsports Group	32	Chevy	NSM; 28	BRI; 17	LGY; 14	SBO	SBO	MEM	NJM	TMP	NHA	IOW	GLN	GTW	NHA	DOV	29th	73	

==== K&N Pro Series West ====
NASCAR K&N Pro Series West results
Year	Team	No.	Make	1	2	3	4	5	6	7	8	9	10	11	12	13	14	NKNPSWC	Pts
2016	Nick Sommer Racing	39	Toyota	IRW	KCR	TUS	OSS	CNS	SON	SLS; 17	IOW		DCS; 16	MMP; 16	MMP; 16	MER; 21		18th	179
2016	Nick Sommer Racing	38	Toyota									EVG; 21						18th	179
2016	Nick Sommer Racing	39	Chevy														AAS; 22	18th	179
2017	Patriot Motorsports Group	38	Chevy	TUS; 21	KCR; 20	IRW; Wth	IRW; Wth	SPO; 21	OSS	CNS	SON	IOW	EVG	DCS	MER	AAS	KCR	25th	92
2018	Patriot Motorsports Group	32	Ford	KCR; 17	TUS	TUS	OSS	CNS	SON	DCS	IOW	EVG	GTW	LVS	MER	AAS	KCR	53rd	27

^{*} Season still in progress
^{1} Ineligible for series points

=== ARCA Racing Series ===
(key) (Bold – Pole position awarded by qualifying time. Italics – Pole position earned by points standings or practice time. * – Most laps led.)

ARCA Racing Series results
Year	Team	No.	Make	1	2	3	4	5	6	7	8	9	10	11	12	13	14	15	16	17	18	19	20	ARSC	Pts	Ref
2018	Patriot Motorsports Group	38	Chevy	DAY	NSH	SLM	TAL	TOL	CLT; Wth	POC	MCH	MAD	GTW	CHI	IOW	ELK	POC	ISF	BLN	DSF	SLM	IRP	KAN	106th	0	

^{*} Season still in progress
^{1} Ineligible for series points
