= Collin Cabre =

American racing driver (born 1993)

- Born: October 8, 1993 (age 33); Tampa, Florida, U.S.

ARCA Menards Series East career
- 42 races run over 3 years
- Best finish: 6th (2016)
- First race: 2015 Hart to Heart Breast Cancer Foundation 150 (New Smyrna)
- Last race: 2017 National Fallen Firefighters Foundation 125 (Dover)
Wins	Top tens	Poles
1	14	2
- Statistics up to date as of November 21, 2024.

Collin Cabre (born October 8, 1993) is an American former professional stock car racing driver who has competed in the NASCAR K&N Pro Series East from 2015 to 2017. He is a former member of the Drive for Diversity by Rev Racing.

Cabre is the older brother of fellow racing driver Chase Cabre, who also competed in the East Series as well as the ARCA Menards Series.

== Motorsports results ==
=== NASCAR ===
(key) (Bold - Pole position awarded by qualifying time. Italics - Pole position earned by points standings or practice time. * – Most laps led.)

==== K&N Pro Series East ====
NASCAR K&N Pro Series East results
Year	Team	No.	Make	1	2	3	4	5	6	7	8	9	10	11	12	13	14	NKNPSEC	Pts	Ref
2015	Rev Racing	2	Toyota	NSM; 15	GRE; 15	BRI; 24	IOW; 13	BGS; 17	LGY; 15	COL; 13	NHA; 24	IOW; 6	GLN; 16	MOT; 17	VIR; 4	RCH; 17	DOV; 1*	10th	424	
2016	Rev Racing	2	Toyota	NSM; 11	MOB; 22	GRE; 11	BRI; 6	VIR; 21	DOM; 18	STA; 6	COL; 3	NHA; 23	IOW; 3	GLN; 5	GRE; 15	NJM; 4	DOV; 21	6th	447	
2017	Rev Racing	2	Toyota	NSM; 22	GRE; 17	BRI; 6	SBO; 11	SBO; 16	MEM; 7	BLN; 10	TMP; 17	NHA; 11	IOW; 14	GLN; 16	LGY; 5	**NJE**; 15	**DOV**; 8	9th	444	
