= ARCA races at Dover =

ARCA Menards Series race held at Dover Motor Speedway

- Venue: Dover Motor Speedway
- Location: Dover, Delaware, United States

Circuit information
- Surface: Concrete
- Length: 1 mi (1.6 km)
- Turns: 4

Stock car racing events in the ARCA Menards Series East have been held at Dover Motor Speedway, in Dover, Delaware during numerous seasons and times of year since 1998.

== General Tire 125 ==
General Tire 125
ARCA Menards Series East
- Venue: Dover Motor Speedway
- Location: Dover, Delaware, United States
- Corporate sponsor: General Tire
- First race: 1998
- Last race: 2023
- Distance: 125 miles (201.168 km)
- Laps: 125
- Previous names: Delaware 200 (1998); MBNA E-Commerce 150 (2001); MBNA All American Heroes 150 (2002); MBNA America 150 (2004); MBNA Race Points 150 (2005); Sunoco 150 (2006-2010); Dover 150 (2011); American Real TV 150 (2012); Drive Sober 150 (2013-2014); Drive Sober 125 (2015); Dover 125 (2016); National Fallen Firefigheters Foundation 125 presented by Carl Deputy & Son Builders (2017); Crosley 125 (2018); General Tire 125 (2019-2023)

Circuit information
- Surface: Concrete
- Length: 1 mi (1.6 km)
- Turns: 4

The General Tire 125 was an ARCA Menards Series East race held at Dover Motor Speedway, Prior to 2020, it was the final race of the season and was held before the NASCAR Xfinity Series event, the BetRivers 200.

=== Past winners ===
Year	Date	No.	Driver	Team	Manufacturer	Race distance		Race time	Average speed (mph)
Year	Date	No.	Driver	Team	Manufacturer	Laps	Miles (km)	Race time	Average speed (mph)
1998	July 18	12	Jimmy Spencer	Spencer Motor Ventures	Chevrolet	200	200 (321.869)	2:03:46	96.957
1999 – 2000	Not held								
2001	September 21	60	Dale Shaw	Dale Shaw Racing	Chevrolet (2)	154*	154 (247.839)	1:42:40	90.000
2002	September 20	40	Matt Kobyluck	Matt Kobyluck Racing	Chevrolet (3)	150	150 (241.402)	1:17:28	116.179
2003	Not held								
2004	September 24	32	Dale Quarterley	Quarterley Racing	Chevrolet (4)	160*	160 (257.495)	1:38:00	97.959
2005	September 23	44	Andy Santerre	Andy Santerre Racing	Chevrolet (5)	150	150 (241.402)	1:45:23	88.772
2006	September 22	9	Tim Andrews	Tim Andrews Racing	Chevrolet (6)	157*	157 (252.667)	1:48:25	86.887
2007	September 21	44	Sean Caisse	Andy Santerre Racing (2)	Chevrolet (7)	150	150 (241.402)	1:47:14	83.929
2008	September 19	8	Aric Almirola	Dale Earnhardt, Inc.	Chevrolet (8)	150	150 (241.402)	1:49:05	90.833
2009	September 25	44	Brett Moffitt	Andy Santerre Racing (3)	Chevrolet (9)	150	150 (241.402)	1:30:23	99.576
2010	September 24	20	Brett Moffitt (2)	Joe Gibbs Racing	Toyota	155*	155 (249.448)	1:52:13	82.875
2011	September 30	6	Bubba Wallace	Revolution Racing	Toyota (2)	152*	152 (244.62)	1:44:28	87.301
2012	September 28	07	Corey LaJoie	Randy LaJoie Racing	Toyota (3)	154*	154 (247.839)	1:47:19	86.001
2013	September 27	13	Austin Hill	Austin Hill Racing	Ford	150	150 (241.402)	1:43:30	86.957
2014	September 26	22	Austin Hill (2)	Austin Hill Racing (2)	Ford (2)	150	150 (241.402)	1:38:31	91.355
2015	October 3*	2	Collin Cabre	Revolution Racing (2)	Toyota (4)	125	125 (201.168)	1:22:11	103.902
2016	September 30	40	Kyle Benjamin	Ranier Racing with MDM	Chevrolet (10)	126*	126 (202.777)	1:20:26	93.797
2017	September 29	12	Harrison Burton	MDM Motorsports	Toyota (5)	128*	128 (205.996)	1:22:36	92.978
2018	October 6*	6	Rubén García Jr.	Revolution Racing (3)	Toyota (6)	125	125 (201.168)	1:15:36	99.206
2019	October 4	21	Sam Mayer	GMS Racing (3)	Chevrolet (11)	125	125 (201.168)	1:15:36	99.206
2020	August 21	21	Sam Mayer (2)	GMS Racing (4)	Chevrolet (12)	125	125 (201.168)	1:00:00	116.219
2021	May 14	18	Ty Gibbs	Joe Gibbs Racing (2)	Toyota (7)	125	125 (201.168)	1:28:11	85.050
2022	April 29	17	Taylor Gray	David Gilliland Racing	Ford (3)	125	125 (201.168)	1:03:00	119.048
2023	April 28	20	Jake Finch	Venturini Motorsports	Toyota (8)	127*	127 (204.343)	1:10:38	107.881

- 2001, 2004, 2006, 2010–2012, 2016–2017, and 2023: Race extended due to a NASCAR Overtime finish.
- 2015 and 2018: Race postponed from Friday to Saturday due to rain.

=== Multiple winners (drivers) ===
# Wins	Driver	Years won
2	Brett Moffitt	2009, 2010
2	Austin Hill	2013, 2014
2	Sam Mayer	2019, 2020

== General Tire 150 ==
General Tire 150
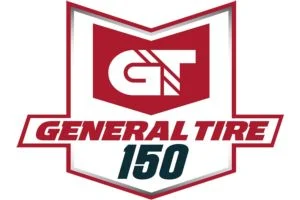

ARCA Menards Series ARCA Menards Series East
- Venue: Dover Motor Speedway
- Location: Dover, Delaware, United States
- Corporate sponsor: General Tire
- First race: 2024
- Last race: 2025
- Distance: 150 mi (241.402 km)
- Laps: 150
- Most wins (team): Pinnacle Racing Group (2)
- Most wins (manufacturer): Chevrolet (2)

Circuit information
- Surface: Concrete
- Length: 1 mi (1.6 km)
- Turns: 4

The General Tire 150 was a ARCA Menards Series/ARCA Menards Series East combination race held at Dover Motor Speedway in Dover, Delaware.

=== History ===
The ARCA Menards Series joined the ARCA Menards Series East in this race starting in 2024. The race was removed from both series' schedules.

=== Past winners ===
Year	Date	No.	Driver	Team	Manufacturer	Race Distance		Race Time	Average Speed (mph)
Year	Date	No.	Driver	Team	Manufacturer	Laps	Miles (km)	Race Time	Average Speed (mph)
2024	April 26	28	Connor Zilisch	Pinnacle Racing Group	Chevrolet	150	150 (241.402)	1:46:2	84.879
2025	July 18	28	Brenden Queen	Pinnacle Racing Group	Chevrolet	150	150 (241.402)	1:23:5	107.164

=== Multiple winners (teams) ===
# Wins	Team	Years won
2	Pinnacle Racing Group	2024, 2025

=== Manufacturer wins ===
# Wins	Manufacturer	Years won
2	Chevrolet	2024, 2025

Previous race: Lime Rock Park 100	ARCA Menards Series; General Tire 150	Next race: Circle City 150

Previous race: Dutch Boy 150	ARCA Menards Series East; General Tire 150	Next race: Circle City 150
