= Who's Your Driver Twin 100s =

WhosYourDriver.org Twin 100
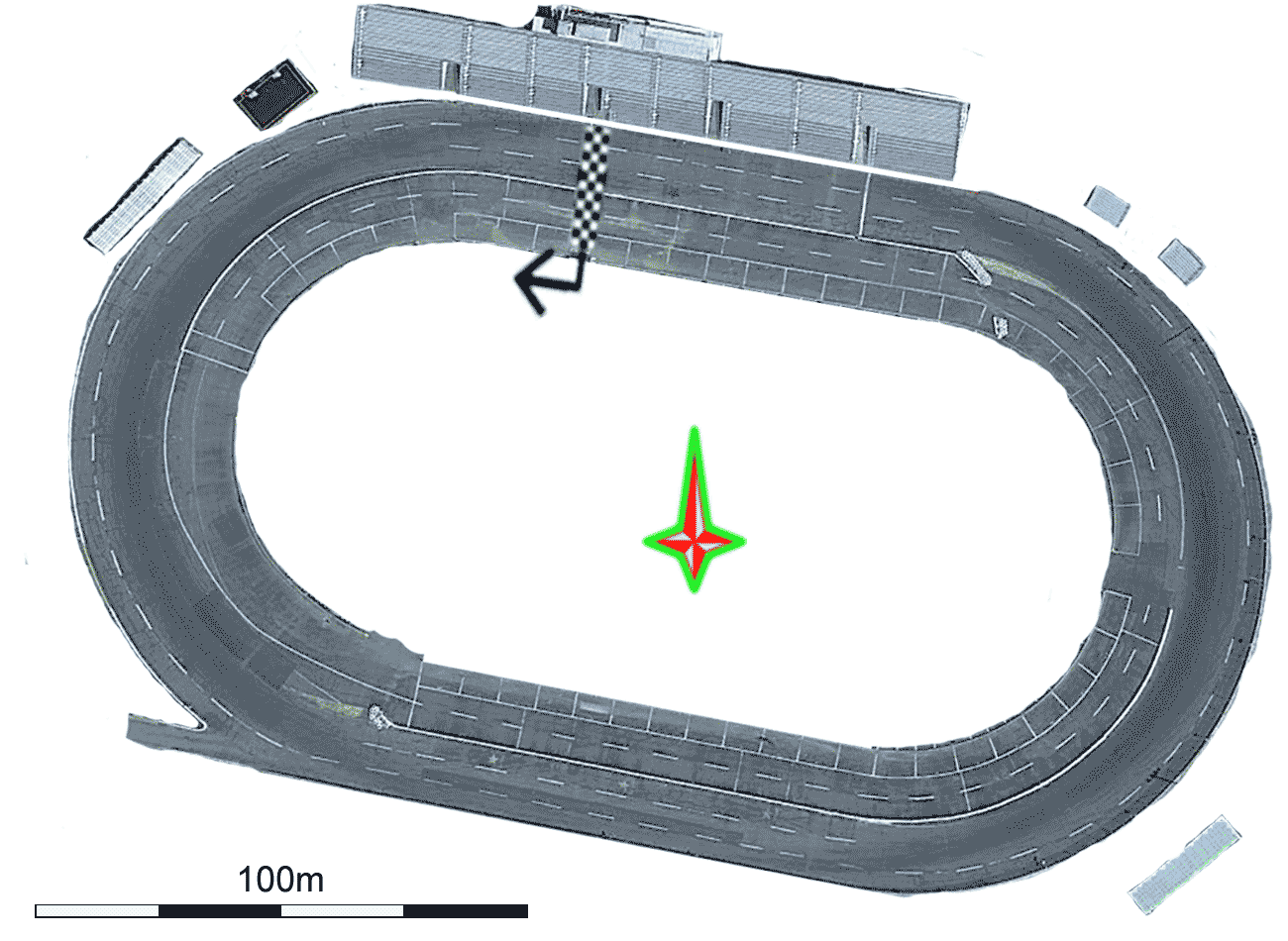

NASCAR K&N Pro Series East
- Venue: South Boston Speedway
- Location: South Boston, Virginia; United States
- Corporate sponsor: WhosYourDriver.org
- First race: 2007
- Last race: 2019
- Distance: 40 miles (64.373 km)
- Laps: 100
- Previous names: South Boston 150 (2007, 2009–2011); Strutmasters.com 150 (2008)

Circuit information
- Surface: Asphalt
- Length: 0.400 mi (0.644 km)
- Turns: 2

The WhosYourDriver.org Twin 100s is a dual NASCAR K&N Pro Series East race held annually at South Boston Speedway. From 2007 to 2011, the race was held as a 150-lap race. After a hiatus from 2012 to 2016, the event returned in 2017 in its current Twin 100 format.

== Past winners ==
| Year | Date | No. | Driver | Team | Manufacturer | Race distance | | Race time | Average speed (mph) |
| Year | Date | No. | Driver | Team | Manufacturer | Laps | Miles (km) | Race time | Average speed (mph) |
|---|---|---|---|---|---|---|---|---|---|
| 2007 | June 2 | 40 | Matt Kobyluck | Kobyluck Enterprises | Chevrolet | 150 | 60 (96.560) | 1:13:15 | 49.147 |
| 2008 | May 31 | 15 | Brian Ickler | Ickler Motorsports | Chevrolet | 155* | 62 (99.779) | 1:11:46 | 51.835 |
| 2009 | May 30 | 44 | Brett Moffitt | Andy Santerre Racing | Chevrolet (3) | 150 | 60 (96.560) | 0:56:24 | 63.83 |
| 2010 | April 3 | 18 | Max Gresham | Joe Gibbs Racing | Toyota | 150 | 60 (96.560) | 0:55:14 | 65.178 |
| 2011 | April 17 | 4 | Sergio Pena | Rev Racing | Toyota | 150 | 60 (96.560) | 1:09:14 | 51.998 |
| 2012 – 2016 | Not held | | | | | | | | |
| 2017 | May 6 | 40 | Travis Miller | MDM Motorsports | Toyota | 100 | 40 (64.373) | 0:30:25 | 74.904 |
| 2017 | May 6 | 12 | Harrison Burton | MDM Motorsports | Toyota | 100 | 40 (64.373) | 0:36:10 | 66.359 |
| 2018 | May 12 | 17 | Tyler Ankrum | DGR-Crosley | Toyota | 100 | 40 (64.373) | 0:40:55 | 58.656 |
| 2018 | May 12 | 40 | Anthony Alfredo | MDM Motorsports (3) | Toyota | 100 | 40 (64.373) | 0:31:43 | 75.67 |
| 2019 | May 4 | 15 | Tanner Gray | DGR-Crosley (2) | Toyota | 104* | 41.6 (66.949) | 0:31:27 | 79.364 |
| 2019 | May 4–5^{†} | 16 | Derek Kraus | Bill McAnally Racing | Toyota (8) | 100 | 40 (64.373) | 0:33:51 | 70.901 |

- 2008 and 2019: Race extended due to overtime.
- 2019: Twin 100 No. 2 was postponed halfway through from May 4 to May 5.
