= ARCA races at Bristol =

Stock car racing events in Tennessee, USA

ARCA Menards Series ARCA Menards Series East
- Venue: Bristol Motor Speedway
- Location: Bristol, Tennessee, United States

Circuit information
- Surface: Concrete
- Length: 0.533 mi (0.858 km)
- Turns: 4

Stock car racing events in the ARCA Menards Series have been held at Bristol Motor Speedway, in Bristol, Tennessee during numerous seasons and times of year since 2012.

== ARCA / ARCA East ==
Bush's Best 200
- Corporate sponsor: Bush Brothers and Company
- First race: 2020
- Distance: 106.6 miles (171.556)
- Laps: 200
- Previous names: Bush's Beans 200 (2020–2025)
- Most wins (driver): William Sawalich (2)
- Most wins (team): Joe Gibbs Racing (4)
- Most wins (manufacturer): Toyota (5)

The Bush's Best 200 is an annual 200-lap 106.6-mile (171.6 km) ARCA Menards Series and ARCA Menards Series East combination race held at Bristol Motor Speedway. It is held as part of the fall NASCAR weekend at the track.

=== History ===
In 2020, the ARCA Menards Series East would join the ARCA Menards Series as a part of the event. Due to the COVID-19 pandemic, the race became a combination race for the AMS and the East Series, now known as the ARCA Menards Series East, in 2020, and it has remained a combination race for both series ever since.

From its inception in 2020, the race was apart of the Sioux Chief Showdown (a group of 10 races during the main ARCA Menards Series season, all of which drivers under the age of 18, who cannot run all the races during the season are eligible to compete in, have the opportunity to win a championship in the series.) In 2022, the race was dubbed as the Bush's Beans 200 Sioux Chief Showdown. The Sioux Chief Showdown stopped in 2023.

In 2026, Bush's Best remained as the sponsor but the race would be known as the Bush's Best 200.

=== Past winners ===
Year	Date	No.	Driver	Team	Manufacturer	Race distance		Race time	Average speed (mph)	Report	Ref
Year	Date	No.	Driver	Team	Manufacturer	Laps	Miles	Race time	Average speed (mph)	Report	Ref
2020	September 17	21	Sam Mayer	GMS Racing	Chevrolet	200	106.6 (171.556)	1:43.48	61.618	Report	
2021	September 16	18	Ty Gibbs	Joe Gibbs Racing	Toyota	200	106.6 (171.556)	1:39:44	64.131	Report	
2022	September 15	18	Sammy Smith	Kyle Busch Motorsports	Toyota (2)	200	106.6 (171.556)	1:33:43	68.248	Report	
2023	September 14	18	William Sawalich	Joe Gibbs Racing (2)	Toyota (3)	200	106.6 (171.556)	1:37:12	120.308	Report	
2024	September 19	18	William Sawalich (2)	Joe Gibbs Racing (3)	Toyota (4)	200	106.6 (171.556)	1:42:02	64.253	Report	
2025	September 11	18	Brent Crews	Joe Gibbs Racing (4)	Toyota (5)	204*	108.732 (174.995)	1:18:5	82.651	Report	
2026	September 17	28	Carson Brown	Pinnacle Racing Group	Chevrolet (2)	200	106.6 (171.556)	1:26:4	73.88	Report	

- 2025: Race extended due to a green-white-checker finish.

== ARCA East (Spring) ==
Zombie Auto 150
- Corporate sponsor: Zombie Auto
- First race: 2012
- Last race: 2019
- Distance: 79.95-mile (128.67 km)
- Laps: 150
- Previous names: Widow Wax 125 presented by SealWrap Repair Tape (2012); DRIVE4COPD 125 (2013–2014); PitLite 125 (2015–2016); Zombie Auto 125 (2017)
- Most wins (manufacturer): Toyota (4)

The Zombie Auto 150 was an annual 150-lap 79.95-mile (128.67 km) ARCA Menards Series East race held at Bristol Motor Speedway. It was held as part of the spring NASCAR weekend at the track.

=== History ===
Nelson Piquet Jr. won the inaugural race in 2012, becoming the first Brazilian driver to win a NASCAR race. The race was extended from 125 to 150 laps in 2018 and also implemented a stage racing format.

=== Past winners ===
Year	Date	No.	Driver	Team	Manufacturer	Race distance		Race time	Average speed (mph)	Report	Ref
Year	Date	No.	Driver	Team	Manufacturer	Laps	Miles	Race time	Average speed (mph)	Report	Ref
2012	March 17	14	Nelson Piquet Jr.	X Team Racing	Toyota	127*	68 (109.435)	1:02:06	65.402	Report	
2013	March 16	98	Dylan Kwasniewski	Turner Scott Motorsports	Chevrolet	125	66.6 (107.182)	1:08:37	58.258	Report	
2014	March 15	71	Eddie MacDonald	Grimm Racing	Chevrolet (2)	132*	70 (112.654)	1:13:55	57.011	Report	
2015	April 18	27	Kyle Benjamin	Benjamin Motorsports	Ford	125	66.6 (107.182)	0:57:08	69.968	Report	
2016	April 16	39	Chad Finchum	Martin-McClure Racing	Toyota (2)	125	66.6 (107.182)	0:53:51	74.234	Report	
2017	April 22	12	Harrison Burton	MDM Motorsports	Toyota (3)	70*	37 (59.545)	0:39:19	56.938	Report	
2018	April 14	98	Todd Gilliland	DGR-Crosley	Toyota (4)	150	80 (128.7)	1:06:28	72.172	Report	
2019	April 6	21	Sam Mayer	GMS Racing	Chevrolet (3)	150	80 (128.7)	0:55:20	86.693	Report	

- 2012 and 2014: Race extended due to a green-white-checker finish.
- 2017: Race shortened due to rain.
- 2020: Race cancelled due to the COVID-19 pandemic.

== ARCA East (Fall) ==
Bush's Beans 150
- Corporate sponsor: Bush Brothers and Company
- First race: 2019
- Last race: 2019
- Distance: 79.95-mile (128.67 km)
- Laps: 150
- Previous names: Bush's Beans 150 (2019)
- Most wins (driver): Sam Mayer (1)
- Most wins (team): GMS Racing (1)
- Most wins (manufacturer): Chevrolet (1)

The Bush's Beans 150 was an annual 150-lap 79.95-mile (128.67 km) ARCA Menards Series East race held at Bristol Motor Speedway. It was held as part of the fall NASCAR weekend at the track.

=== History ===
In advance of the 2019 NASCAR K&N Pro Series East season, the tour added a second event at Bristol.

=== Past winners ===
Year	Date	No.	Driver	Team	Manufacturer	Race distance		Race time	Average speed (mph)	Report	Ref
Year	Date	No.	Driver	Team	Manufacturer	Laps	Miles	Race time	Average speed (mph)	Report	Ref
2019	August 15	21	Sam Mayer	GMS Racing	Chevrolet	150	80 (128.7)	0:51:04	93.936	Report	

Previous race: Spruce 212	ARCA Menards Series; Bush's Best 200	Next race: Menards 150

Previous race: JR & CO. 150	ARCA Menards Series East; Bush's Best 200	Next race: Cook Out 200 (the next season)
