= Sioux Chief PowerPEX 200 (Memphis) =

ARCA Menards Series
- Venue: Memphis International Raceway
- Location: Millington, Tennessee; United States
- Corporate sponsor: Sioux Chief Manufacturing
- First race: 2017
- Last race: 2020
- Distance: 150.0 (241.401)
- Laps: 200
- Previous names: Memphis 125 presented by AutoZone (2017); Memphis 150 presented by AutoZone (2018–2019)

Circuit information
- Surface: Asphalt
- Length: 0.75 mi (1.21 km)
- Turns: 4

The Sioux Chief PowerPEX 200 was an ARCA Menards Series race held annually at Memphis International Raceway in Millington, Tennessee. It serves as the finale of the Sioux Chief Short Track Showdown, and was formerly sanctioned by the NASCAR K&N Pro Series East.

== History ==
2017 was the first year that the NASCAR K&N Pro Series East raced at Memphis International Raceway. After spending three years under the K&N East banner, the race was sanctioned by the ARCA Menards Series for the first time in 2020.

== Past winners ==
Year	Date	No.	Driver	Team	Manufacturer	Race distance		Race time	Average speed (mph)
Year	Date	No.	Driver	Team	Manufacturer	Laps	Miles	Race time	Average speed (mph)
NASCAR K&N Pro Series East
2017	June 3	12	Harrison Burton	MDM Motorsports	Toyota	125	93.8 (150.08)	1:07:43	83.067
2018	June 2	6	Rubén García Jr.	Rev Racing	Toyota	150	112.5 (181.051)	1:12:18	93.361
2019	June 1	4	Chase Cabre	Rev Racing (2)	Toyota (3)	150	112.5 (181.051)	1:17:16	87.36
ARCA Menards Series
2020	September 26	18	Ty Gibbs	Joe Gibbs Racing	Toyota	200	150.0 (241.401)	1:44:44	85.933

Previous race: Winchester	ARCA Menards Series; Sioux Chief PowerPEX 200	Next race: Speediatrics 150
