= King Cadillac GMC Throwback 100 =

NASCAR K&N Pro Series East
- Venue: Thompson Speedway Motorsports Park
- Location: Thompson, Connecticut; United States
- Corporate sponsor: King Cadillac GMC
- First race: 1988
- Distance: 62.5 miles (100.584 km)
- Laps: 100

Circuit information
- Surface: Asphalt
- Length: .625 mi (1.006 km)
- Turns: 4

The King Cadillac GMC Throwback 100 was a NASCAR K&N Pro Series East race that took place at Thompson Speedway Motorsports Park in Thompson, Connecticut. The race adopted its "throwback" format in 2017. On June 4, 2019, NASCAR announced the cancellation of the 2019 event. Ricky Craven had the most triumphs of any driver, winning the event three times.

== Past winners ==
| Year | Date | No | Driver | Team | Manufacturer | Race distance | | Race time | Average speed (mph) |
| Year | Date | No | Driver | Team | Manufacturer | Laps | Miles (km) | Race time | Average speed (mph) |
|---|---|---|---|---|---|---|---|---|---|
| 1988 | July 31 | 71 | Bobby Dragon (1, 2) | | Buick | 100 | 62.5 (100.584) | 0:41:03 | 91.389 |
| 1989 | August 9 | 71 | Bobby Dragon (1, 2) | Henry Shaw, Jr. | Pontiac | 100 | 62.5 (100.584) | 0:55:03 | 68.639 |
| 1990 | August 19 | 25 | Ricky Craven | Craven Racing | Pontiac (2) | 160* | 100 (160.934) | 1:21:07 | 73.968 |
| 1990 | September 8 | 72 | Ken Bouchard | | Pontiac (3) | 200 | 125 (201.168) | 1:23:23 | 89.446 |
| 1991 | June 2 | 51 | Mike McLaughlin | Greci Motorsports | Oldsmobile | 150 | 93.75 (150.876) | 1:11:39 | 78.507 |
| 1991 | August 11 | 25 | Ricky Craven (2, 3) | Craven Racing (2, 3) | Chevrolet | 150 | 93.75 (150.876) | 1:12:09 | 77.963 |
| 1991 | September 8 | 25 | Ricky Craven (2, 3) | Craven Racing (2, 3) | Chevrolet | 200 | 125 (201.168) | 1:37:27 | 77.347 |
| 1992 | Not held | | | | | | | | |
| 1993 | September 1 | 48 | Robbie Crouch | Mountain Racing | Oldsmobile (2) | 154* | 96.25 (154.899) | 1:16:34 | 73.47 |
| 1994 | August 7 | 47 | Kelly Moore | Kelly Moore Racing | Chevrolet (3) | 150 | 93.75 (150.876) | 1:18:19 | 71.824 |
| 1995 | June 18 | 44 | Andy Santerre | Andy Santerre Racing | Chevrolet (4) | 125 | 78.125 (125.73) | 0:57:30 | 81.475 |
| 1995 | October 29 | 09 | Mike Stefanik | Mountain Racing (2) | Oldsmobile (3) | 150 | 93.75 (150.876) | 1:14:36 | 75.402 |
| 1996 | June 23 | 15 | Jerry Marquis | O'Connor Racing | Chevrolet (5) | 150 | 93.75 (150.876) | 1:21:47 | 68.779 |
| 1996 | September 22 | 94 | Jeff Fuller | ST Motorsports | Chevrolet | 213* | 133.125 (214.243) | 1:43:08 | 77.448 |
| 1997 | June 22 | 15 | Jerry Marquis | O'Connor Racing | Chevrolet | 153* | 95.625 (153.893) | 1:12:14 | 79.43 |
| 1997 | September 7 | 51 | Mike Stefanik (2, 3) | Greci Motorsports (2, 3) | Chevrolet (8, 9) | 300 | 187.5 (301.752) | 2:19:27 | 80.674 |
| 1998 | September 13 | 51 | Mike Stefanik (2, 3) | Greci Motorsports (2, 3) | Chevrolet (8, 9) | 300 | 187.5 (301.752) | 2:25:32 | 77.3 |
| 1999 | May 16 | 47 | Kelly Moore (2) | Kelly Moore Racing (2) | Pontiac (4) | 150 | 93.75 (150.876) | 1:21:33 | 68.976 |
| 2000 | August 27 | 14 | Tracy Gordon | Tracy Gordon | Chevrolet (10) | 150 | 93.75 (150.876) | 1:19:27 | 70.799 |
| 2001 | July 14 | 56 | Martin Truex Jr. | SeaWatch Racing | Chevrolet | 150 | 93.75 (150.876) | 1:18:32 | 71.626 |
| 2002 | July 13 | 55 | Brad Leighton | Grizco Racing | Chevrolet | 150 | 93.75 (150.876) | 1:22:23 | 68.278 |
| 2003 | July 12 | 03 | Tom Carey, Jr. | Richard Doyle / Tommy Mahan | Chevrolet | 150 | 93.75 (150.876) | 1:13:02 | 77.02 |
| 2004 | May 22 | 35 | Brad Leighton (2) | NDS Motorsports | Chevrolet | 156* | 97.5 (156.911) | 1:17:25 | 74.795 |
| 2005 | October 30 | 77 | Eddie MacDonald | Jerry Morello | Chevrolet | 102* | 63.75 (102.595) | 0:59:22 | 63.915 |
| 2006 | June 29 | 40 | Matt Kobyluck | Kobyluck Enterprises | Chevrolet | 100 | 62.5 (100.584) | 1:01:15 | 60.735 |
| 2007 | July 14 | 44 | Sean Caisse | Andy Santerre Racing (2) | Chevrolet | 108* | 67.5 (108.630) | 1:02:43 | 64.06 |
| 2008 | July 12 | 1 | Trevor Bayne | Dale Earnhardt Inc. | Chevrolet (18) | 100 | 62.5 (100.584) | 0:54:13 | 69.167 |
| 2009 | July 11 | 00 | Ryan Truex | Michael Waltrip Racing | Toyota | 100 | 62.5 (100.584) | 0:51:38 | 72.628 |
| 2010 - 2016 | Not held | | | | | | | | |
| 2017 | July 8 | 12 | Harrison Burton | MDM Motorsports | Toyota | 100 | 62.5 (100.584) | 0:45:14 | 82.903 |
| 2018 | July 14 | 17 | Tyler Ankrum | DGR-Crosley | Toyota (3) | 100 | 62.5 (100.584) | 0:38:41 | 96.941 |

- 1990 (1 of 2), 1993, 2004, 2005, 2007: race extended due to overtime.
- 1996 (1 of 2): race shortened due to rain.
