= MDM Motorsports =

American auto race team

- Owner(s): Matthew Miller; Doug Fuller; Mark McFarland
- Base: Mooresville, North Carolina
- Series: NASCAR K&N Pro Series East; NASCAR K&N Pro Series West; ARCA Racing Series
- Manufacturer: Toyota, Chevrolet
- Opened: 2017
- Closed: 2018

Career
- Debut: Camping World Truck Series: 2017 NextEra Energy Resources 250 (Daytona); K&N Pro Series East: 2017 Jet Tools 150 (New Smyrna); K&N Pro Series West: 2017 Carneros 200 (Sonoma); ARCA Racing Series: 2017 Lucas Oil Complete Engine Treatment 200 (Daytona)
- Latest race: Camping World Truck Series: 2018 Lucas Oil 150 (Phoenix)
- Races competed: Total: 180; Camping World Truck Series: 20; K&N Pro Series East: 52; ARCA Racing Series: 107; K&N Pro Series West: 1
- Drivers' Championships: Total: 3 Camping World Truck Series: 0 K&N Pro Series East: 1 K&N Pro Series West: 1 ARCA Racing Series: 1 K&N Pro Series West: 0
- Race victories: Total: 24; Camping World Truck Series: 1 K&N Pro Series East: 8 K&N Pro Series West: 0 ARCA Racing Series: 15
- Pole positions: Total: 19; Camping World Truck Series: 0 K&N Pro Series East: 6 K&N Pro Series West: 0 ARCA Racing Series: 13

MDM Motorsports was an American professional stock car racing team that most recently competed in the NASCAR K&N Pro Series East, the NASCAR K&N Pro Series West, and the ARCA Racing Series. The team also competed in the NASCAR Camping World Truck Series from 2017 to 2018. The team shut its doors after the 2018 season, despite winning the ARCA Menards Series championship that year.

== Camping World Truck Series ==
For the operations before the 2017 season, see Ranier Racing with MDM

=== Truck No. 99 history ===
After a split from Ranier Racing with MDM following the 2016 season, MDM took the 99 truck up to a full-time entry with a varying rotation of drivers. Austin Dillon scored the team's first top ten finish with a seventh-place finish at Atlanta Motor Speedway in the season's second race. On August 8, 2017, MDM Motorsports announced that Bubba Wallace would drive the 99 truck. Wallace ended up winning at Michigan International Speedway four days later, though the win was pronounced encumbered a couple days later.

The team had a quiet 2018 year, only running the Martinsville spring event with Tyler Matthews, the Eldora event with Sheldon Creed, and the fall Martinsville and ISM event with Chase Purdy.

The team announced on December 8 that they will not field a truck team in 2019, only focusing in K&N Pro Series and ARCA Racing Series.

== K&N Pro Series ==
For the operations before the 2017 season, see Ranier Racing with MDM

=== Car No. 12 history ===
For the operations of No. 12 in the K&N Pro Series East before the 2017 season, see HScott Motorsports

The No. 12 car is driven by Harrison Burton. The car is the same number that Burton drove for HScott Motorsports in 2016. For 2017, Burton uses an unorthodox paint scheme by placing the car number on the quarter panel rather than on the door.

In 2017, Daniel Suárez drove the car in the K&N Pro Series West race at Sonoma.

=== Car No. 40 history ===
In 2018, Anthony Alfredo drove the number 40 full time with 1 victory at South Boston Speedway and finished 5th in the standings.

=== Car No. 41 history ===
Sam Mayer drove two races in the No. 41 finishing fifth and fourth.

== ARCA Racing Series ==
For the operations before the 2017 season, see Ranier Racing with MDM

=== Car No. 8 history ===
The No. 8 made its debut in 2016 at Pocono with Brandon Jones, finishing 3rd. Jones also ran the car at Michigan, Chicagoland, and Kansas. Harrison Burton ran the car at Iowa, and Travis Miller ran the No. 8 at Lucas Oil. Vinnie Miller ran the first race for the No. 8 in 2017 at Fairgrounds Speedway, this time in a Toyota. Brandon Jones ran the car at Pocono, Michigan, and Chicagoland, all as a Chevy. Zane Smith ran the car at Kentucky as a Toyota. The No. 8 made its superspeedway debut in 2018 with new driver Chase Purdy, finishing in 21st at Daytona after a last lap crash. Purdy will run full-time in the car in 2018, all of the races as a Toyota.

=== Car No. 12 history ===
The No. 12 car made its debut at Pocono in 2017 with Sheldon Creed, finishing 8th. Creed also ran the car at Iowa, Lucas Oil, and Kansas.

=== Car No. 28 history ===
Sheldon Creed drove the No. 28 full time in 2018, picking up four wins en route to the series championship.

=== Car No. 40 history ===
Anthony Alfredo and the No. 40 will make their debut on June 22, 2018, at Gateway Motorsports Park

=== Car No. 41 history ===
Zane Smith and Vinnie Miller split driving duties of the No. 41 in 2017. With Miller moving to the Xfinity Series, Smith drove the car full time in 2018, winning four races and finished 2nd in the championship standings to teammate Sheldon Creed.
