= Chad Finley =

American auto racing driver

- Born: Chad J. Finley; March 17, 1992 (age 34); DeWitt, Michigan, U.S.

NASCAR FedEx Freight Truck Series career
- 9 races run over 3 years
- 2019 position: 52nd
- Best finish: 48th (2018)
- First race: 2015 Careers for Veterans 200 (Michigan)
- Last race: 2019 Buckle Up in Your Truck 225 (Kentucky)
Wins	Top tens	Poles
0	1	0
- Statistics up to date as of November 18, 2019.

Chad J. Finley (born March 17, 1992) is an American professional stock car racing driver and team owner. He last competed part-time in the NASCAR Gander Outdoors Truck Series, driving the No. 42 Chevrolet Silverado for Chad Finley Racing. He is the son of former racing driver Jeff Finley, who competed in the Truck Series, the NASCAR Busch Series, and the ARCA Re/Max Series in the past.

== Racing career ==
Finley began his racing career at the age of ten. He finished third in the East Lansing Kart Track Championship points his first season and won the championship the following. He won the Great Lakes Sprint Series Championship and finished sixth in the World Karting Association (WKA) in 2005.

In 2006, Finley made his full-sized stock car debut with the ASA Late Model Series. His first full season in the full-sized stock car came in 2007 when at the age of 15 he won the Outlaw Super Late Model Rookie-of-the-Year award at Spartan Speedway (Mich.).

2008 saw many firsts for Finley. He scored his first career Outlaw Super Late Model feature win at Spartan Speedway (Mich.) and then visited victory lane again just a couple months later, this time driving a Template Pro Late Model in the Super Pro Late Model Series.

In 2009, saw Finley make the jump to the ARCA Racing Series driving for future NASCAR Sprint Cup Series champion Brad Keselowski. He won a pole award at Rockingham Speedway (N.C.), scored one top-five finish, and three top-tens in just four starts that season. Finley made seven starts in the ARCA Racing Series in 2010 where he tied his career best finish of third, twice. Those two top-three finishes came at Rockingham Speedway (N.C.) and Pocono Raceway (Pa.). Chad also raced events at major NASCAR venues such as Texas Motor Speedway (Tex.), and Michigan International Speedway (Mich.).

In 2011, Finley competed for JEGS/CRA All-Stars Tour Championship, finishing third in the overall points standings with five top-five finishes and eight top-ten finishes. He scored two season-high second-place finishes at Lucas Oil Raceway (Ind.) and Dixie Motor Speedway (Mich.) respectively.

In 2012, Finley scored his first career win in the JEGS/CRA All-Stars Tour at Columbus Motor Speedway (Ohio). He also won the Fast Qualifier Award in both the ARCA/CRA Super Series and JEGS/CRA All-Stars and finished the year with four top-five finishes and seven top-ten finishes.

In 2013, Finley ran events in both the ARCA/CRA Super Series and the JEGS/CRA All-Stars Tour, winning two races in the JEGS/CRA All-Stars Tour. He collected five-top five finishes as well as eight top-ten finishes that season as well. At South Alabama Speedway, Finley broke the track record during the 37th Running of the Rattler 250.

In 2014, Finley posted many solid finishes in both Pro and Super Late Model races around the country. He also ran select races in the NASCAR K&N Pro Series. At the end of the season, he moved to Mooresville, N.C., where he expanded Chad Finley Development.

In 2015, Finley made his NASCAR Camping World Truck Series debut, driving the No. 30 Ford F-150 for Rette Jones Racing at Michigan and Chicagoland where he finished 21st in both events.

In 2017, Finley and his race team attempted six ARCA Racing Series races over the course of the year, scoring a win at the Nashville Fairgrounds Speedway in the early spring.

In 2018, Finley attempted two Truck Series races with his team at Gateway Motorsports Park and at Bristol Motor Speedway respectively. He finished an impressive sixth place with their first attempt at Gateway after avoiding some of the late race chaos in the end. While they qualified well at Bristol, the team fell out of the race early. He later ran the Martinsville fall race with Reaume Brothers Racing, but a wreck towards the end of stage 1 derailed their chances of a good run, finishing 32nd.

For the 2019 season, Chad Finley Racing increased their Truck Series schedule to a full-time slate, hiring Robby Lyons to share the No. 42 with Finley starting with the NextEra Energy 250 at Daytona International Speedway. After the Ultimate Tailgating 200 at Atlanta Motor Speedway, the team's hauler and trucks inside were damaged in an accident while leaving the track, forcing them to miss the following week's Strat 200 at Las Vegas Motor Speedway.

== Motorsports career results ==
=== NASCAR ===
(key) (Bold – Pole position awarded by qualifying time. Italics – Pole position earned by points standings or practice time. * – Most laps led.)

==== Nationwide Series ====
NASCAR Nationwide Series results
Year	Team	No.	Make	1	2	3	4	5	6	7	8	9	10	11	12	13	14	15	16	17	18	19	20	21	22	23	24	25	26	27	28	29	30	31	32	33	34	NNSC	Pts	Ref
2011	Team Rensi Motorsports	25	Ford	DAY	PHO	LVS	BRI	CAL	TEX	TAL	NSH	RCH	DAR	DOV	IOW	CLT	CHI	MCH; Wth	ROA	DAY	KEN	NHA	NSH	IRP	IOW	GLN	CGV	BRI	ATL	RCH	CHI	DOV	KAN	CLT	TEX	PHO	HOM	N/A	–	

==== Gander Outdoors Truck Series ====
NASCAR Gander Outdoors Truck Series results
Year	Team	No.	Make	1	2	3	4	5	6	7	8	9	10	11	12	13	14	15	16	17	18	19	20	21	22	23	NGOTC	Pts	Ref
2015	Rette Jones Racing	30	Ford	DAY	ATL	MAR	KAN	CLT	DOV	TEX	GTW	IOW	KEN	ELD	POC	MCH; 21	BRI	MSP	CHI; 21	NHA	LVS	TAL	MAR	TEX	PHO	HOM	54th	46	
2018	Chad Finley Racing	42	Chevy	DAY	ATL	LVS	MAR	DOV	KAN	CLT	TEX	IOW	GTW; 6	CHI	KEN	ELD	POC	MCH	BRI; 30	MSP	LVS	TAL					48th	43	
2018	Reaume Brothers Racing	33	Chevy																				MAR; 32	TEX	PHO	HOM	48th	43	
2019	Chad Finley Racing	42	Chevy	DAY	ATL; 28	LVS	MAR	TEX	DOV	KAN	CLT; 18	TEX	IOW; 28	GTW	CHI	KEN; 26	POC	ELD	MCH	BRI	MSP	LVS	TAL	MAR	PHO	HOM	52nd	48	

==== K&N Pro Series East ====
NASCAR K&N Pro Series East results
Year	Team	No.	Make	1	2	3	4	5	6	7	8	9	10	11	12	13	14	15	16	NKNPSEC	Pts	Ref
2014	Chad Finley Racing	29	Ford	NSM	DAY	BRI	GRE	RCH; 12	IOW	BGS	FIF	LGY	NHA; 5	COL	IOW; DNQ	GLN	VIR	GRE	DOV; 30	29th	101	
2016	Michael Calabrese	43	Ford	NSM	MOB	GRE	BRI	VIR	DOM	STA	COL	NHA	IOW	GLN	GRE	NJE	DOV; 10			51st	34	

==== K&N Pro Series West ====
NASCAR K&N Pro Series West results
Year	Team	No.	Make	1	2	3	4	5	6	7	8	9	10	11	12	13	14	NKNPSWC	Pts	Ref
2014	Chad Finley Racing	29	Ford	PHO	IRW	S99	IOW	KCR	SON	SLS	CNS	IOW; DNQ	EVG	KCR	MMP	AAS	PHO	N/A	–	

^{*} Season still in progress
^{1} Ineligible for series points

=== ARCA Racing Series ===
(key) (Bold – Pole position awarded by qualifying time. Italics – Pole position earned by points standings or practice time. * – Most laps led.)

ARCA Racing Series results
Year	Team	No.	Make	1	2	3	4	5	6	7	8	9	10	11	12	13	14	15	16	17	18	19	20	21	ARSC	Pts	Ref
2009	K Automotive Racing	29	Chevy	DAY	SLM	CAR	TAL	KEN	TOL; 6	POC	MCH	MFD	IOW; 9	KEN	BLN; 3	POC	ISF	CHI	TOL	DSF	NJE	SLM	KAN	**CAR**; 15	32nd	1035	
2010	K Automotive Racing	29	Chevy	DAY	PBE	SLM	TEX; 11	TAL	TOL	POC; 3	MCH; 7	IOW	MFD	POC	BLN	NJE	ISF	CHI; 23	DSF	TOL	SLM	KAN; 30	CAR; 3		27th	1010	
2016	Chad Finley Racing	51	Toyota	DAY	NSH	SLM	TAL	TOL	NJE	POC	MCH; 13	MAD	WIN	IOW	IRP; 5	POC	BLN	ISF	DSF	SLM					50th	485	
2016	Chad Finley Racing	51	Chevy																		CHI; 23	KEN	KAN		50th	485	
2017	Chad Finley Racing	51	Chevy	DAY	NSH; 1	SLM	TAL	TOL; 3	ELK	POC	MCH; 12	MAD	IOW	IRP; 3*	POC	WIN	ISF	ROA	DSF	SLM	CHI; 5	KEN	KAN; 11		21st	1240	
2018	Chad Finley Racing	51	Chevy	DAY	NSH	SLM	TAL	TOL	CLT	POC	MCH; 23	MAD	GTW	CHI	IOW	ELK	POC	ISF	BLN	DSF	SLM	IRP	KAN		100th	115	

=== CARS Super Late Model Tour ===
(key)

CARS Super Late Model Tour results
Year	Team	No.	Make	1	2	3	4	5	6	7	8	9	10	CSLMTC	Pts	Ref
2015	Bob Finley	42	Chevy	SNM	ROU	HCY	SNM	TCM	MMS; 19	ROU	CON	MYB	HCY	55th	15	
