= Gracin Raz =

American racing driver (born 1997)

- Born: April 25, 1997 (age 29); Lake Oswego, Oregon, U.S.

ARCA Menards Series East career
- 4 races run over 2 years
- Best finish: 32nd (2016)
- First race: 2015 UNOH 100 (Richmond)
- Last race: 2016 Biscuitville 125 (Alton)
Wins	Top tens	Poles
0	1	0

ARCA Menards Series West career
- 30 races run over 4 years
- Best finish: 4th (2015)
- First race: 2014 NAPA Auto Parts / Toyota 150 (Evergreen)
- Last race: 2017 NAPA / Toyota 150 (Erie)
- First win: 2015 Toyota / NAPA Auto Parts 150 (Roseville)
Wins	Top tens	Poles
1	22	1
- Statistics up to date as of November 16, 2024.

Gracin Raz (born April 25, 1997) is an American professional stock car racing driver who has competed in the NASCAR K&N Pro Series East and the NASCAR K&N Pro Series West. He is the older brother of fellow racing driver Kole Raz, who has competed in the now ARCA Menards Series West, as well as the main ARCA Menards Series and the NASCAR O'Reilly Auto Parts Series.

Raz has also previously competed in series such as the Northwest Super Late Model Series, the SRL Spears Southwest Tour Series, the Northwest Pro-4 Alliance Challenge Series, and the Budweiser Crown Series.

== Motorsports results ==
=== NASCAR ===
(key) (Bold - Pole position awarded by qualifying time. Italics - Pole position earned by points standings or practice time. * – Most laps led.)

==== K&N Pro Series East ====
NASCAR K&N Pro Series East results
Year	Team	No.	Make	1	2	3	4	5	6	7	8	9	10	11	12	13	14	NKNPSEC	Pts	Ref
2015	Jefferson Pitts Racing	72	Ford	NSM	GRE	BRI	IOW	BGS	LGY	COL	NHA	IOW	GLN	MOT	VIR	RCH; 34	DOV	66th	10	
2016	Jefferson Pitts Racing	27	Ford	NSM; 12	MOB	GRE	BRI; 7	VIR; 15	DOM	STA	COL	NHA	IOW	GLN	GRE	NJM	DOV	32nd	98	

==== K&N Pro Series West ====
NASCAR K&N Pro Series West results
Year	Team	No.	Make	1	2	3	4	5	6	7	8	9	10	11	12	13	14	NKNPSWC	Pts	Ref
2014	Bill McAnally Racing	99	Toyota	PHO	IRW	S99	IOW	KCR	SON	SLS	CNS	IOW	EVG; 6	KCR	MMP			32nd	75	
2014	Bill McAnally Racing	7	Toyota													AAS; 7	PHO	32nd	75	
2015	Jefferson Pitts Racing	27	Ford	KCR; 6	IRW; 4	TUS; 2		SHA; 4	SON; 12	SLS; 3	IOW; 9	EVG; 4	CNS; 6	MER; 6	**AAS**; 1	PHO; 24		4th	489	
2015	Jefferson Pitts Racing	72	Ford				IOW; 7											4th	489	
2016	Jefferson Pitts Racing	27	Ford	IRW; 14*	KCR; 7	TUS; 16	OSS; 2	CNS; 3	SON; 3	SLS; 4	IOW; 4	EVG; 4	DCS; 2	UMC; 3	UMC; 11	MER; 5	AAS; 18	5th	524	
2017	Jefferson Pitts Racing	27	Ford	KCR	TUS	IRW	IRW	SPO	OSS	CNS; 4	SON	IOW	EVG	DCS	MER	AAS	KCR	41st	40	
