= John Holleman IV =

American racing driver (born 1997)

- Born: April 7, 1997 (age 29); Winston-Salem, North Carolina, U.S.

ARCA Menards Series East career
- 22 races run over 4 years
- Best finish: 11th (2016)
- First race: 2014 NASCAR Hall of Fame 150 (Winston Salem)
- Last race: 2017 Kevin Whitaker Chevrolet 150 (Greenville-Pickens)
Wins	Top tens	Poles
0	4	1
- Statistics up to date as of November 21, 2024.

John Holleman IV (born April 7, 1997) is an American professional stock car racing driver who has competed in the NASCAR K&N Pro Series East from 2014 to 2017.

Holleman has also competed in series such as the SMART Modified Tour, the PASS Pro Late Model Series, and the INEX Summer Shootout, and is a frequent competitor at Bowman Gray Stadium.

== Motorsports results ==
=== NASCAR ===
(key) (Bold - Pole position awarded by qualifying time. Italics - Pole position earned by points standings or practice time. * – Most laps led.)

==== K&N Pro Series East ====
NASCAR K&N Pro Series East results
Year	Team	No.	Make	1	2	3	4	5	6	7	8	9	10	11	12	13	14	15	16	NKNPSEC	Pts	Ref
2014	Precision Performance Motorsports	46	Toyota	NSM	DAY	BRI	GRE	RCH	IOW	BGS; 19	FIF	LGY; 12	NHA	COL	IOW	GLN	VIR	GRE	DOV	41st	57	
2015	Zeno Marshall	49	Chevy	NSM; 20	GRE; 17															29th	100	
2015	Zeno Marshall	49	Toyota			BRI; 19	IOW	BGS; 20	LGY	COL	NHA	IOW	GLN	MOT	VIR	RCH	DOV			29th	100	
2016	Zeno Marshall	49	Ford	NSM; 18	MOB; 14	GRE; 17	BRI; 24	VIR; 22	DOM; 9	**STA**; 11	COL; 6	NHA; 12	IOW; 6	GLN; 14	GRE; 7	NJM; 14	DOV; 20			11th	424	
2017	Zeno Marshall	49	Ford	NSM; 25	GRE; 16	BRI; Wth	SBO	SBO	MEM	BLN	TMP	NHA	IOW	GLN	LGY	NJM	DOV			38th	47	

=== SMART Modified Tour ===
SMART Modified Tour results
Year	Car owner	No.	Make	1	2	3	4	5	6	7	8	9	10	11	12	13	14	SMTC	Pts	Ref
2024	N/A	69	N/A	FLO	CRW	SBO	TRI	ROU	HCY	FCS	CRW	JAC	CAR	CRW; 16	DOM	SBO	NWS; 16	41st	50	
2026	N/A	69	N/A	FLO	AND	SBO	DOM	HCY	WKS	FCR	CRW	PUL	CAR; 15	ROU; Wth	TRI	NWS		52nd	26	
