= Ali Kern =

American racing driver (born 1993)

- Born: May 11, 1993 (age 33); Fremont, Ohio, U.S.

ARCA Menards Series East career
- 17 races run over 3 years
- Best finish: 12th (2016)
- First race: 2010 NASCAR K&N Pro Series 125 (Lee)
- Last race: 2016 Dover 125 (Dover)
Wins	Top tens	Poles
0	1	0
- Statistics up to date as of November 22, 2024.

Ali Kern Dukeshire (born May 11, 1993) is an American professional stock car racing driver who has competed in the NASCAR K&N Pro Series East from 2010 to 2016.

Kern has also competed in series such as the ASA CRA Super Series, the CRA JEGS All-Stars Tour, the Midwest Modifieds Tour, and the Template Body Racing Association.

== Motorsports results ==
=== NASCAR ===
(key) (Bold - Pole position awarded by qualifying time. Italics - Pole position earned by points standings or practice time. * – Most laps led.)

==== K&N Pro Series East ====
NASCAR K&N Pro Series East results
Year	Team	No.	Make	1	2	3	4	5	6	7	8	9	10	11	12	13	14	NKNPSEC	Pts	Ref
2010	Ed Reuda	28	Chevy	GRE	SBO	IOW	MAR	NHA	LRP	LEE; 20	JFC	NHA	DOV					57th	103	
2011	Michael Kern	28	Chevy	GRE; 26	SBO	RCH	IOW	BGS	JFC	LGY	NHA	COL; 20	GRE	NHA	DOV			47th	188	
2016	Rev Racing	4	Toyota	NSM; 20	MOB; 13	GRE; 18	BRI; 27	VIR; 14	DOM; 15	STA; 14	COL; 10	NHA; 25	IOW; 16	GLN; 13	GRE; 12	NJM; 13	DOV; 13	12th	393	

=== CARS Super Late Model Tour ===
(key)

CARS Super Late Model Tour results
Year	Team	No.	Make	1	2	3	4	5	6	7	8	9	10	CSLMTC	Pts	Ref
2016	Kern Motorsports	4	Ford	SNM	ROU	HCY	TCM	GRE	ROU	CON; 8	MYB	HCY	SNM	43rd	25	
