= 2016 NASCAR K&N Pro Series East =

NASCAR season

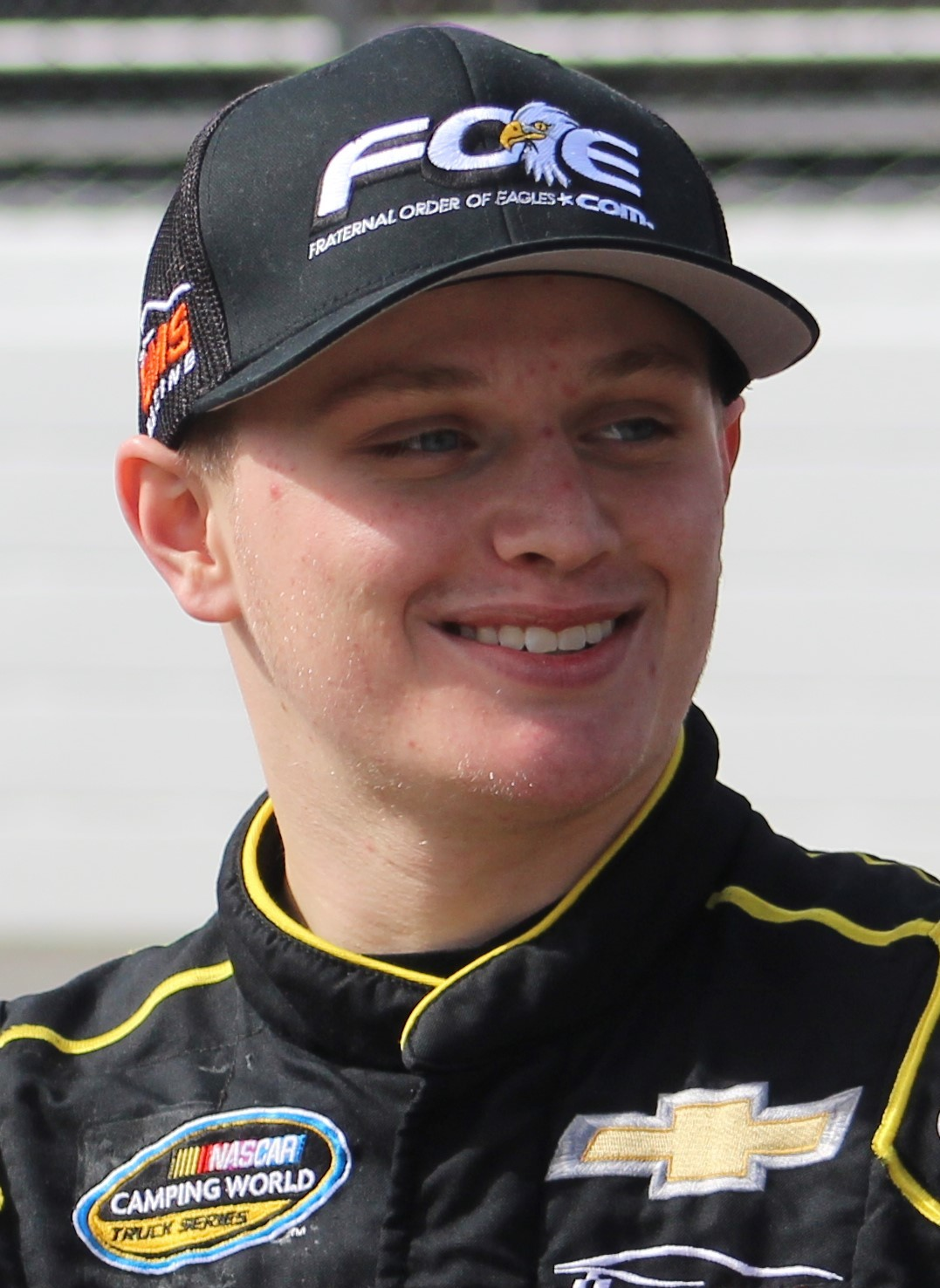
Justin Haley, the 2016 K&N Pro Series East champion.

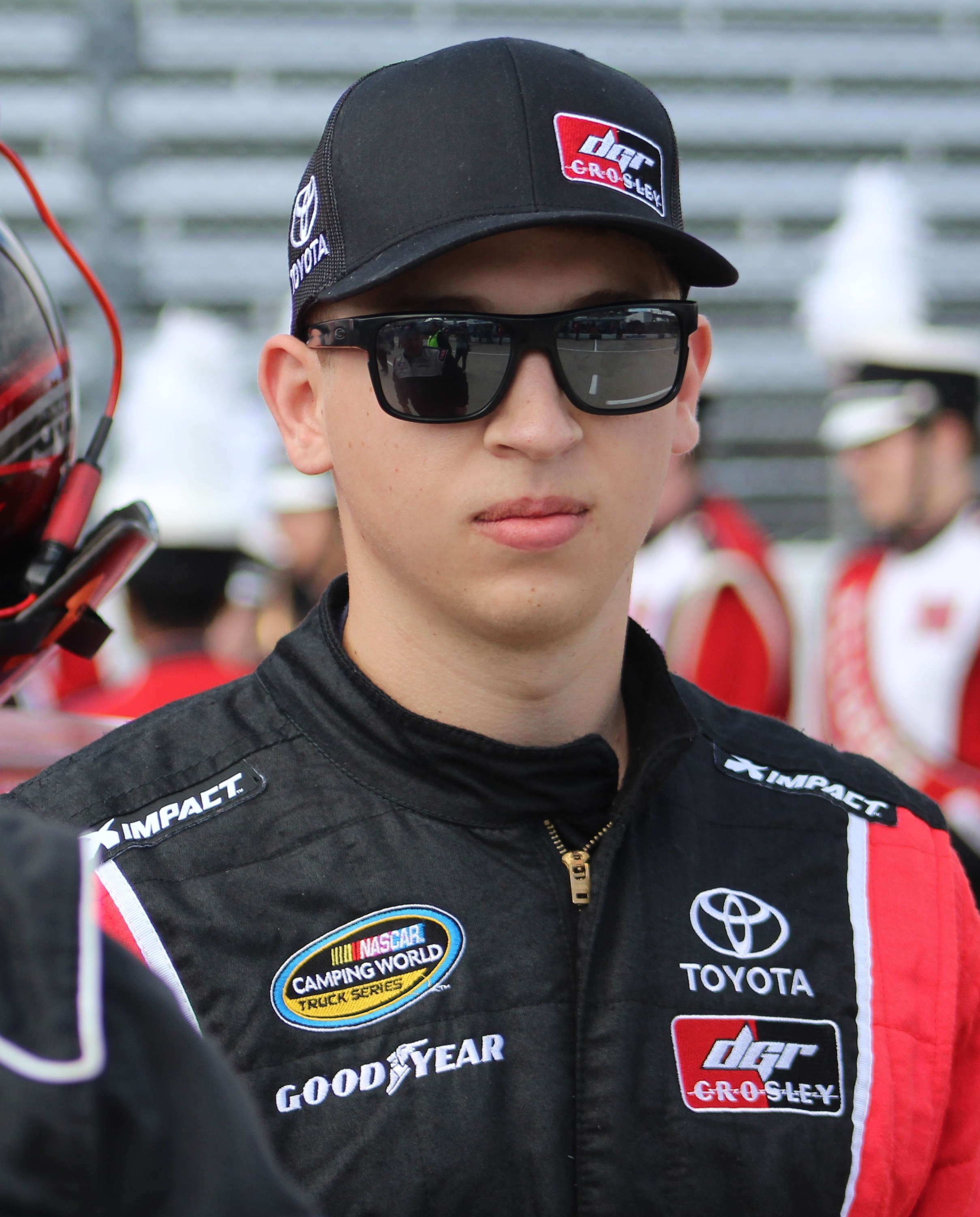
Kyle Benjamin finished second behind Haley by 22 points.

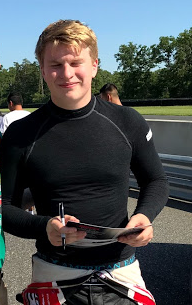
Tyler Dippel finished third in the championship.

The 2016 NASCAR K&N Pro Series East was the 30th season of the K&N Pro Series East. It began at New Smyrna Speedway on February 14 and concluded at Dover International Speedway on September 30. William Byron was the defending Drivers' Champion. Justin Haley won the championship, 22 points in front of Kyle Benjamin.

== Drivers ==
No.	Manufacturer	Car Owner	Race Driver	Crew Chief
1	Toyota	Shigeaki Hattori	Austin Theriault 11	John Monsam 3 J. R. Norris 2 Rich Lushes 9
1	Toyota	Shigeaki Hattori	Spencer Davis (R) 3	John Monsam 3 J. R. Norris 2 Rich Lushes 9
02	Chevrolet 2 Ford 3 Toyota 1	Tony Blanchard 5	Sarah Cornett-Ching (R) 5	Jerry Babb 1
02	Chevrolet 2 Ford 3 Toyota 1	Tony Blanchard 5	Sarah Cornett-Ching (R) 5	Matt Weber 3
02	Chevrolet 2 Ford 3 Toyota 1	Tony Blanchard 5	Sarah Cornett-Ching (R) 5	Sam Almeida 1
02	Chevrolet 2 Ford 3 Toyota 1	Barry Wilson 1	Grant Quinlan (R) 1	Andrew Abbott 1
2	Toyota	Max Siegel	Collin Cabre	Matt Bucher
3	Toyota	Ben Kennedy	Kaz Grala 8	Mike Fritts
04	Ford 6	Ronnie Bassett	Ronnie Bassett Jr. 7	Bruce Cook 5
04	Chevrolet 1	Ronnie Bassett	Ronnie Bassett Jr. 7	Ron Otto 2
4	Toyota	Max Siegel	Ali Kern (R) (Note: Ali Kern drove in the NAPA 150 with car number 33.)	Johnny Allen
5	Chevrolet	Harry Scott Jr.	Justin Haley	Shannon Rursch
6	Toyota	Max Siegel	Rubén García Jr. (R) (Note: Rubén García Jr. drove in the Casey's General Store 150 with car number 66.)	Steve Plattenberger
7	Chevrolet	Larry Berg	Codie Rohrbaugh 5	Mark Huff 3
7	Chevrolet	Larry Berg	Codie Rohrbaugh 5	Thomas Rohrbaugh 2
08	Ford	Paul Green	Tyler Hughes (R) 5	Paul Green 1
08	Ford	Paul Green	Tyler Hughes (R) 5	Darren Shaw 4
09	Toyota 2	Rodrigo San Martin	Christian Celaya 9	Tony Ponkauskas
09	Chevrolet 1	Rodrigo San Martin	Christian Celaya 9	Tony Ponkauskas
09	Ford 6	Rodrigo San Martin	Christian Celaya 9	Tony Ponkauskas
12	Toyota	Justin Marks	Harrison Burton (R)	Rich Lushes 4
12	Toyota	Justin Marks	Harrison Burton (R)	Skip Eyler 7
12	Toyota	Justin Marks	Harrison Burton (R)	Doug Howe 3
13	Chevrolet	Justin Marks	Hunter Baize (R)	Kris Bowen
14	Chevrolet	Bobby Hutchens	Trey Hutchens 8 (Note: Trey Hutchens drove in the Casey's General Store 150 with car number 15.)	Bobby Hutchens Jr.
15	Ford	Rob Fuller	Christian Eckes (R) 3	Ron Otto
16	Toyota	Bill McAnally 2 Mike Curb 4	Todd Gilliland (R) 5	John Camilleri 1
16	Toyota	Bill McAnally 2 Mike Curb 4	Todd Gilliland (R) 5	Chris Lawson 4
16	Toyota	Bill McAnally 2 Mike Curb 4	Riley Herbst (R) 1	Duane Knorr 1
18	Toyota	Sam Hunt	Sergio Peña 1	Jerry Babb
18	Toyota	Sam Hunt	Sam Hunt 1	Jerry Babb
19	Toyota 2	Bill McAnally 2	Riley Herbst (R) 2	Duane Knorr 2
19	Ford 2	Chuck Buchanan 2	Chuck Buchanan Jr. 1	Craig Wood 2
19	Ford 2	Chuck Buchanan 2	Grant Winchester (R) 1	Craig Wood 2
21	Chevrolet	Tommy Baldwin Jr.	Brandon McReynolds 3	Trip Bruce
23	Chevrolet	J. P. Morgan	J. P. Morgan 1	James Beck
27	Ford	Jeff Jefferson	Gracin Raz 3	Jeff Jefferson
28	Ford	Logan Yiengst	Clair Zimmerman (R) 2	Logan Yiengst
29	Toyota	Mark Rette	Jesse Little 5	Matt Noyce 7 Sam Schram 1
29	Toyota	Mark Rette	Grant Quinlan (R) 1	Matt Noyce 7 Sam Schram 1
29	Toyota	Mark Rette	Corey Deuser (R) 2	Matt Noyce 7 Sam Schram 1
30	Ford	Mark Rette	Dominique Van Wieringen (R) (Note: Dominique Van Wieringen drove in the Casey's General Store 150 with car number 28.)	Mark Rette
31	Chevrolet	Ted Marsh	Ryan Preece 2	Todd Fisette
31	Chevrolet	Ted Marsh	Reid Lanpher (R) 2	Todd Fisette
31	Chevrolet	Ted Marsh	Trey Hutchens 1	Todd Fisette
31	Chevrolet	Ted Marsh	Glen Reen (R) 1	Todd Fisette
31	Chevrolet	Ted Marsh	Chase Dowling (R) 1	Todd Fisette
38	Chevrolet	Harry Scott Jr.	Tyler Dippel (R)	Fuz Burgdoff
39	Toyota	Eric McClure	Chad Finchum 4 (Note: Chad Finchum drove in the Casey's General Store 150 with car number 33.)	Chris Carrier 9 John Monsam 1
39	Toyota	Eric McClure	Austin Cindric 2	Chris Carrier 9 John Monsam 1
39	Toyota	Eric McClure	Justin Fontaine 3	Chris Carrier 9 John Monsam 1
39	Toyota	Eric McClure	Austin Hill 1	Chris Carrier 9 John Monsam 1
40	Chevrolet	Michael Hillman	Kyle Benjamin	Mardy Lindley
41	Chevrolet	Douglas Fuller	Spencer Davis (R) 7	Doug Howe
41	Chevrolet	Douglas Fuller	Corey LaJoie 1	Doug Howe
42	Toyota	Max Siegel	Jairo Avila Jr. (R) 11	Mark Green
42	Toyota	Max Siegel	Enrique Baca (R) 3	Mark Green
43	Ford	Michael Calabrese	David Calabrese (R) 3	Scott Kilbury 2 Bruce Cook 4
43	Ford	Michael Calabrese	Ronnie Bassett Jr. 2	Scott Kilbury 2 Bruce Cook 4
43	Ford	Michael Calabrese	Chad Finley 1	Scott Kilbury 2 Bruce Cook 4
44	Ford 6 Toyota 2 Chevrolet 1	Ronnie Bassett	Dillon Bassett 9	Terry Elmore 1
44	Ford 6 Toyota 2 Chevrolet 1	Ronnie Bassett	Dillon Bassett 9	Ron Otto 1
44	Ford 6 Toyota 2 Chevrolet 1	Ronnie Bassett	Dillon Bassett 9	Nathan Kennedy 5
44	Ford 6 Toyota 2 Chevrolet 1	Ronnie Bassett	Dillon Bassett 9	Kenyon Davidson 2
45	Chevrolet	John Stange	John Gustafson (R) 1	Gary Moore
46	Toyota 4 Chevrolet 3	Rick Gdovic	Ulysse Delsaux (R) 1	Charles Denike III 3 Mark Setzer 4
46	Toyota 4 Chevrolet 3	Rick Gdovic	Brandon Gdovic 1	Charles Denike III 3 Mark Setzer 4
46	Toyota 4 Chevrolet 3	Rick Gdovic	Brian Henderson (R) 5	Charles Denike III 3 Mark Setzer 4
49	Ford	Zeno Marshall Jr.	John Holleman IV (R)	Caleb Velez 1
49	Ford	Zeno Marshall Jr.	John Holleman IV (R)	Corey LaJoie 12
49	Ford	Zeno Marshall Jr.	John Holleman IV (R)	Charles Denike III 1
51	Chevrolet	Thomas Oakley	Brandon Oakley (R) 2	Tony Ponkauskas
55	Ford	Jerry Pitts	Noah Gragson 13 (Note: Noah Gragson drove in the Stafford 150, the NAPA 150, the Bully Hill Vineyards 100, the Kevin Whitaker Chevrolet 140 and the JUSTDRIVE.com 125 with car number 7.)	Jerry Pitts 13
55	Ford	Jerry Pitts	Spencer Davis (R) 1	Jerry Babb 1
66	Chevrolet	Barry Wilson	Reid Wilson (R) 4	Andrew Abbott
71	Chevrolet	Rob Grimm	Eddie MacDonald 4	Rollie Lachance Jr.
75	Chevrolet 1	Hal Martin 2	Caleb Holman 1	Tim Andrews 1
75	Toyota 2	Hal Martin 2	Justin Fontaine 1	Bruce Cook 1
75	Toyota 2	Bob Schacht 1	Adam Andretti (R) 1	Bob Schacht 1
77	Toyota	Steve Green	Clayton Green (R) 4	Steve Green
88	Ford	Troy Cline	Alex Schutte 1	Troy Cline
92	Chevrolet 1	Scott Davis	Spencer Davis (R) 2	Neil Lewis
92	Toyota 1	Scott Davis	Spencer Davis (R) 2	Neil Lewis
98	Chevrolet	Harry Scott Jr.	Cole Custer 1	Skip Eyler

== Schedule ==
All of the races in the 2016 season - with the exception of the Biscuitville 125 and JUSTDRIVE.com 125 - were televised on NBCSN and were on a tape delay basis.

No.	Race title	Track	Date
1	Jet Tools 150	New Smyrna Speedway, New Smyrna Beach, Florida	February 14
2	Mobile 150 presented by Mobile Sports Authority	Mobile International Speedway, Irvington, Alabama	March 13 (Note: The Mobile 150 presented by Mobile Sports Authority was postponed a day because of persistent rain.)
3	Kevin Whitaker Chevrolet 150	Greenville-Pickens Speedway, Greenville, South Carolina	March 26
4	PittLite 125	Bristol Motor Speedway, Bristol, Tennessee	April 16
5	Biscuitville 125	Virginia International Raceway, Danville, Virginia	April 30
6	ComServe Wireless 150	Dominion Raceway, Woodford, Virginia	May 30
7	Stafford 150	Stafford Motor Speedway, Stafford, Connecticut	June 17
8	NAPA 150	Columbus Motor Speedway, Columbus, Ohio	July 2
9	United Site Services 70	New Hampshire Motor Speedway, Loudon, New Hampshire	July 16
10	Casey's General Store 150 (Note: The Casey's General Store 150 was held as a combined event, with competitors from the K&N Pro Series East competing along with competitors for the K&N Pro Series West. The race was run with a series-based point distribution, where drivers receive points and statistical credit for their finish relative to other drivers in their series, not to the whole field in general.)	Iowa Speedway, Newton, Iowa	July 29
11	Bully Hill Vineyards 100	Watkins Glen International, Watkins Glen, New York	August 5
12	Kevin Whitaker Chevrolet 140	Greenville-Pickens Speedway, Greenville, South Carolina	September 5
13	JUSTDRIVE.com 125	New Jersey Motorsports Park, Millville, New Jersey	September 17
14	Dover 125	Dover International Speedway, Dover, Delaware	September 30

== Results and standings ==
=== Races ===
No.	Race	Pole position	Most laps led	Winning driver	Manufacturer
1	Jet Tools 150	Todd Gilliland	Todd Gilliland	Todd Gilliland	Toyota
2	Mobile 150 presented by Mobile Sports Authority	Spencer Davis	Tyler Dippel	Tyler Dippel	Chevrolet
3	Kevin Whitaker Chevrolet 150	Kyle Benjamin	Kyle Benjamin	Justin Haley	Chevrolet
4	PittLite 125	Harrison Burton	Chad Finchum	Chad Finchum	Toyota
5	Biscuitville 125	Austin Cindric	Austin Cindric	Austin Cindric	Toyota
6	ComServe Wireless 150	Kyle Benjamin	Kyle Benjamin	Spencer Davis	Chevrolet
7	Stafford 150	John Holleman IV	Dominique Van Wieringen	Noah Gragson	Ford
8	NAPA 150	Justin Haley	Justin Haley	Justin Haley	Chevrolet
9	United Site Services 70	Kyle Benjamin	Kyle Benjamin	Corey LaJoie	Chevrolet
10	Casey's General Store 150	Kyle Benjamin	Todd Gilliland	Kyle Benjamin	Chevrolet
11	Bully Hill Vineyards 100	Austin Cindric	Austin Cindric	Austin Cindric	Toyota
12	Kevin Whitaker Chevrolet 140	Kyle Benjamin	Kyle Benjamin	Kyle Benjamin	Chevrolet
13	JUSTDRIVE.com 125	Justin Haley	Dominique Van Wieringen	Noah Gragson	Ford
14	Dover 125	Justin Haley^{1}	Kyle Benjamin	Kyle Benjamin	Chevrolet

Notes

- ^{1} – The qualifying session for the Dover 125 was cancelled due to weather. The starting line-up was decided by Owners' championship.

=== Drivers' championship ===
(key) Bold – Pole position awarded by time. Italics – Pole position set by final practice results or Owners' points. * – Most laps led.

Pos	Driver	NSM	MOB	GRE	BRI	VIR	DOM	STA	COL	NHA	IOW	GLN	GRE	NJM	DOV	Points
1	Justin Haley	5	9	1	4	2	2	4	**1***	3	7	2	5	**2**	4	580
2	Kyle Benjamin	4	6	**2***	2	4	**23***	12	11	**4***	**2**	6	**1***	3	1*	558
3	Tyler Dippel **(R)**	8	1*	8	17	19	11	17	8	10	14	7	11	7	7	475
4	Hunter Baize **(R)**	29	8	10	16	6	8	9	15	6	8	9	14	10	15	463
5	Noah Gragson	6	12	7	12	17	3	1	5	11	13^{2}	15	13	1	24	454
6	Collin Cabre	11	22	11	6	21	18	6	3	23	4	5	15	4	21	447
7	Harrison Burton **(R)**	13	7	15	**23**	11	21	15	4	7	26	12	9	15	6	444
8	Spencer Davis **(R)**	2	**2**	4	14	23	1	3	17	16	15		10	12	25	440
9	Dominique Van Wieringen **(R)**	10	20	16	11	18	24	16*	13	27	18	16	3	5*	3	429
10	Rubén García Jr. **(R)**	21	18	19	18	8	6	10	16	20	33	17	8	6	5	425
11	John Holleman IV **(R)**	18	14	17	24	22	9	**11**	6	12	10	14	7	14	20	424
12	Ali Kern **(R)**	20	13	18	27	14	15	14	10	25	29	13	12	13	13	393
13	Austin Theriault	24	4	14	15	3	5	7	2	5	3	20				383
14	Jairo Avila Jr. **(R)**	23	15	12	22	7	12	19	14	19	20	21				308
15	Ronnie Bassett Jr.	3	10	3	19	5	19	21					4		26	286
16	Kaz Grala	15	5	9	3	20	4			21		4				272
17	Dillon Bassett	27	24	5	5	13	22	2					6		23	270
18	Trey Hutchens	14	21	20	13	24	Wth			8	19				11	230
19	Christian Celaya	26	17	21	20		16	8		22	21				27	226
20	Todd Gilliland **(R)**	**1***			9			5	7	2	1*^{2}					202
21	Jesse Little		3		Wth^{1}					17	11				2	161
22	Brian Henderson **(R)**					9	14			15		18	17			147
23	Tyler Hughes **(R)**						17			24		11		8	17	143
24	Chad Finchum				1*					14	30				14	135
25	Sarah Cornett-Ching **(R)**	22	11	13	29	16										129
26	Eddie MacDonald				8			13		26					12	117
27	Reid Wilson **(R)**	17		6			10			28						115
28	Justin Fontaine						13	20			22		16			113
29	Riley Herbst **(R)**	9			10						6^{2}				8	105
30	Codie Rohrbaugh	19	19		26					13					22	101
31	Christian Eckes **(R)**						7		9	18						98
32	Gracin Raz	12			7	15					9^{2}					98
33	Austin Cindric					**1***						**1***				96
34	Brandon McReynolds									29			2		19	82
35	Enrique Baca **(R)**												22	11	18	81
36	Ryan Preece	7								9						72
37	David Calabrese **(R)**	16	25										21			70
38	Corey Deuser **(R)**								12				19			57
39	Clayton Green **(R)**	25	23	Wth	28											56
40	Clair Zimmerman **(R)**						20								16	42
41	Grant Quinlan **(R)**							18			32					52
42	Brandon Oakley **(R)**								18				18			52
43	Corey LaJoie									1						47
44	Cole Custer											3				41
45	Reid Lanpher **(R)**				25			22								41
46	Adam Andretti **(R)**											8				36
47	Austin Hill													9		35
48	Chase Dowling **(R)**														9	35
49	J. P. Morgan					10										34
50	Alex Schutte											10				34
51	Chad Finley														10	34
52	Sergio Peña					12										32
53	Brandon Gdovic		16													28
54	Glen Reen **(R)**											19				25
55	Grant Winchester **(R)**												20			24
56	Caleb Holman				21											23
57	John Gustafson **(R)**												23			21
58	Ulysse Delsaux **(R)**	28														16
	Chuck Buchanan Jr.						Wth									0
	Sam Hunt						Wth									0
Drivers ineligible for K&N Pro Series East points
	Ryan Partridge										5					
	Cole Rouse **(R)**										12					
	Blaine Perkins **(R)**										16					
	Julia Landauer **(R)**										17					
	Ron Norman										23					
	Will Rodgers **(R)**										24					
	Chris Eggleston										25					
	Jesse Iwuji **(R)**										27					
	Dan Phillippi **(R)**										28					
	Matt Levin										31					
Pos	Driver	NSM	MOB	GRE	BRI	VIR	DOM	STA	COL	NHA	IOW	GLN	GRE	NJM	DOV	Points

Notes

- ^{1} – Jesse Little received championship points, despite the fact that he withdrew prior to the race.
- ^{2} – Scored points towards the K&N Pro Series West.

== See also ==
- 2016 NASCAR Sprint Cup Series
- 2016 NASCAR Xfinity Series
- 2016 NASCAR Camping World Truck Series
- 2016 NASCAR K&N Pro Series West
- 2016 NASCAR Whelen Modified Tour
- 2016 NASCAR Whelen Southern Modified Tour
- 2016 NASCAR Pinty's Series
- 2016 NASCAR Whelen Euro Series
