= Mobile 150 =

Mobile 150 presented by Mobile Sports Authority
NASCAR K&N Pro Series East
- Venue: Mobile International Speedway
- Location: Irvington, Alabama; United States
- Corporate sponsor: Sports Authority
- First race: 2016
- Last race: 2016
- Distance: 75 miles (120.721 km)
- Laps: 150

Circuit information
- Surface: Asphalt
- Length: 0.5 mi (0.80 km)
- Turns: 4

The Mobile 150 presented by Sports Authority was a NASCAR K&N Pro Series East race held at Mobile International Speedway in Irvington, Alabama. The race was 75 mi (121 km) in distance.

== History ==
A. J. McCarron served as grand marshal for the inaugural race. Tyler Dippel won the inaugural race, which ran long due to a late restart.

== Past winners ==
Year	Date	No.	Driver	Team	Manufacturer	Race distance		Race time	Average speed (mph)
Year	Date	No.	Driver	Team	Manufacturer	Laps	Miles	Race time	Average speed (mph)
2016	March 13*	38	Tyler Dippel	HScott Motorsports	Chevrolet	154*	78 (125.529)	1:24:31	54.664

- 2016: Race extended due to overtime.
- 2016: Race postponed from Saturday to Sunday due to rain.
