= Tyler Dippel =

American racing driver (born 2000)

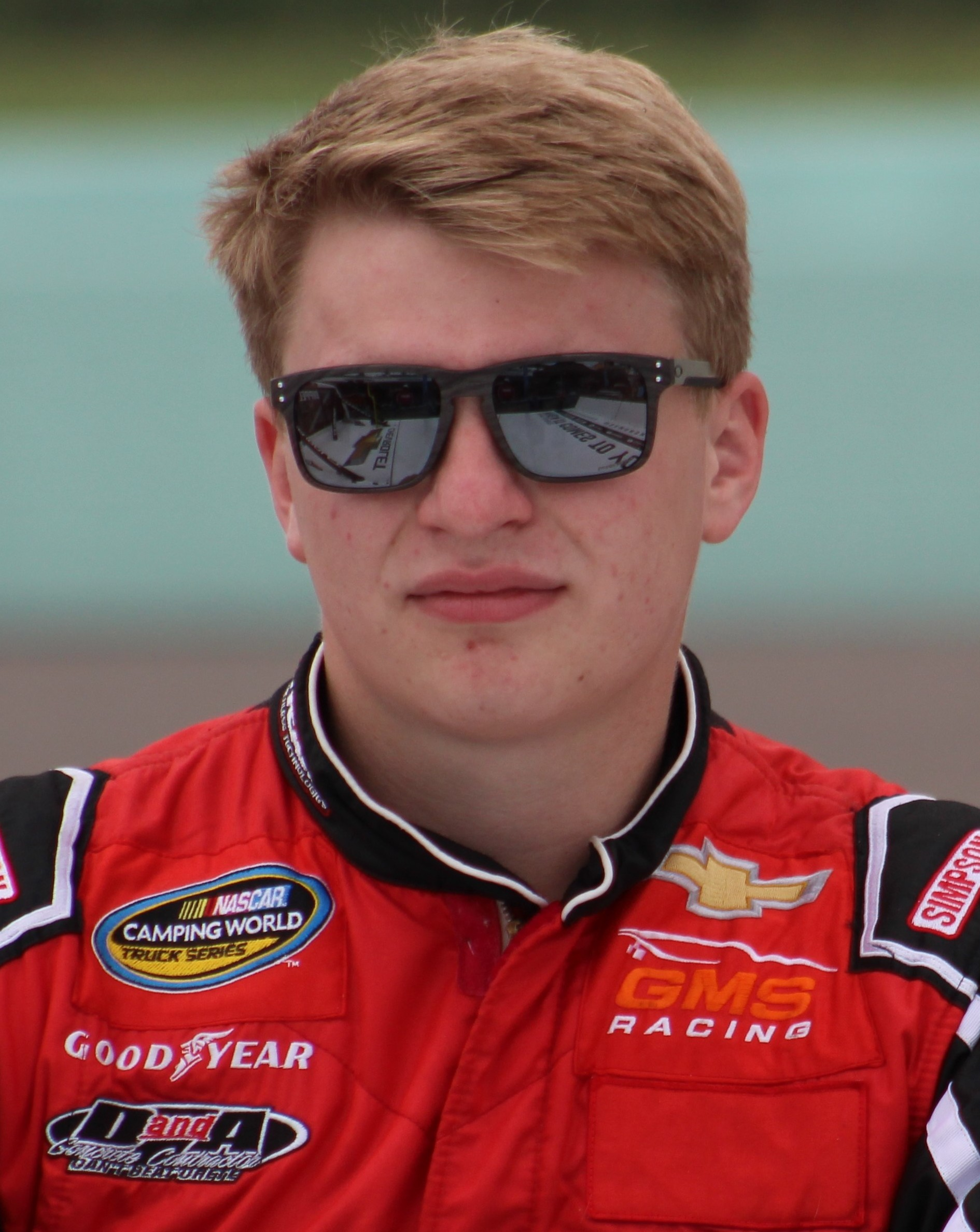
- Dippel at Homestead–Miami Speedway in 2018
- Born: Tyler William Dippel; April 5, 2000 (age 26); Wallkill, New York, U.S.

NASCAR FedEx Freight Truck Series career
- 27 races run over 2 years
- 2019 position: 13th
- Best finish: 13th (2019)
- First race: 2018 Eldora Dirt Derby (Eldora)
- Last race: 2019 Ford EcoBoost 200 (Homestead)
Wins	Top tens	Poles
0	3	0

ARCA Menards Series career
- 9 races run over 4 years
- Best finish: 42nd (2015)
- First race: 2015 Allen Crowe 100 (Springfield)
- Last race: 2019 Lucas Oil 200 (Daytona)
Wins	Top tens	Poles
0	3	0
- Statistics up to date as of November 15, 2019.

Tyler William Dippel (born April 5, 2000) is an American former professional stock car racing driver. He last competed full-time in the NASCAR Gander Outdoors Truck Series in 2019, driving the No. 02 Chevrolet Silverado for Young's Motorsports.

== Racing career ==
=== Early years ===
In his childhood, Dippel started his racing career in go-karts at Oakland Valley Speedway. He later raced big-block modifieds in New York at tracks like Orange County Fair Speedway, sometimes traveling to the southeastern United States. He also raced dirt bikes and four-wheelers, leading to multiple injuries as a child. As he advanced, he was a mainstay at the top of the PASS super late model tour standings until late season troubles in 2015.

=== Developmental series ===
Moving to stock cars in 2016, Dippel teamed with HScott Motorsports with Justin Marks for the NASCAR K&N Pro Series East season. He won his second-ever start in the series, at Mobile International Speedway in Alabama. In April, he was named to the NASCAR Next class for 2016 and 2017.

After HScott closed at the end of 2016, a new team to the KNPSE signed Dippel for 2017 in Rette Jones Racing. Dippel raced three races with ARCA Racing Series team Win-Tron Racing in 2017, at Toledo Speedway and the series' two dirt track races. He failed to finish two but turned in a third-place showing at Illinois State Fairgrounds Racetrack. In 2018, Dippel signed with Chad Bryant Racing and finished sixth with the team in his first race at Nashville Fairgrounds Speedway.

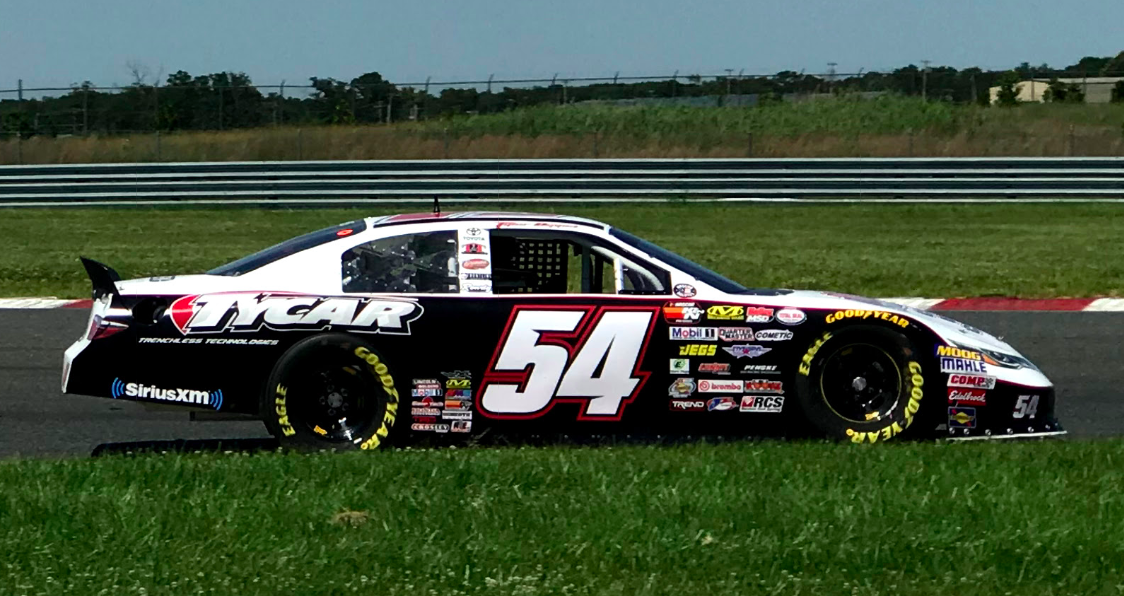
Dippel on track at New Jersey Motorsports Park in 2018

In early February 2018, Dippel and RJR confirmed a second season together in the NASCAR K&N Pro Series East. Dippel left the team after one race, citing a lack of performance, and joined MDM Motorsports for the second race on the schedule. After that, Dippel joined DGR-Crosley for the remainder of the 2018 season. He won his first race with the team, at Langley Speedway, after winning the pole. He and teammate Tyler Ankrum used tire strategy to their advantage, conserving them at the start to have the most speed at the end. Before the season finale, it was announced that after deliberation within the team following the previous race, Dippel and the team would move in different directions. The move came after Ankrum had voiced displeasure with Dippel's driving after the end of the New Hampshire race. Dippel had also intentionally crashed Ankrum at the conclusion of the race at New Jersey Motorsports Park. Team owner David Gilliland stated: "After much internal discussion following the race at New Hampshire, we agreed parting ways was the right decision for all parties involved. Tyler has been an integral part of our program this year and we thank him for his contribution to our growth and success. We wish him and his family nothing but the best going forward."

=== Gander Outdoors Truck Series ===
Parlaying off of his K&N efforts, Dippel made his NASCAR Camping World Truck Series debut at Eldora Speedway in 2018 with DGR-Crosley, driving the organization's No. 17 entry. On September 26, 2018, it was announced that he would join GMS Racing's No. 25 entry for the four remaining races of 2018. His best result on the year came at the Eldora race, finishing thirteenth.

For 2019, Dippel was announced to take over the No. 02 truck at Young's Motorsports, replacing Austin Hill. His first career top-ten finish came at Texas Motor Speedway in April. Dippel drew the ire of competitor Ben Rhodes at the Eldora Dirt Derby; Dippel failed an attempted slide job on Rhodes late in the race, pushing Rhodes into the fence and dropping him six spots behind Dippel. After the race, Dippel rammed into Rhodes on the cooldown lap, leading Rhodes to attempt to drag Dippel out of his truck on pit road after the race before being pulled away by NASCAR officials. Dippel later called out Rhodes in an expletive-laced tirade, calling it "cool" that Rhodes would miss the playoffs and implying that Rhodes was scared of fighting him. Rhodes, in a calmer postrace interview, called Dippel a dirty driver.

On August 23, 2019, days before the Chevrolet Silverado 250 at Canadian Tire Motorsport Park, Dippel was indefinitely suspended by NASCAR for violating its conduct policy. At the time of his suspension, he was 13th in points with three top-ten finishes. On the Monday after the suspension was announced, it was confirmed by NASCAR that the suspension stemmed from a traffic stop and subsequent arrest in New York when state troopers found drugs linked to Adderall in Dippel's vehicle. The charges were dropped the following week and he was reinstated, however, he lost his ride at the conclusion of the 2019 season and has not raced since.

== Personal life ==
In March 2019, Dippel was arrested on account of reckless driving during the Martinsville Speedway race weekend, later pleading guilty to improper driving. In summer 2019, Dippel was ejected from a casino near Pocono Raceway for having a fake identification card. In August 2019, Dippel was charged with criminal possession of a controlled substance in New York after state troopers found amphetamines in his car. The charges were eventually dropped after the amphetamines in the car were found to have belonged to a friend who claimed responsibility to leaving it in the car.

== Motorsports career results ==
=== NASCAR ===
(key) (Bold – Pole position awarded by qualifying time. Italics – Pole position earned by points standings or practice time. * – Most laps led.)

==== Gander Outdoors Truck Series ====
NASCAR Gander Outdoors Truck Series results
Year	Team	No.	Make	1	2	3	4	5	6	7	8	9	10	11	12	13	14	15	16	17	18	19	20	21	22	23	NGOTC	Pts	Ref
2018	DGR-Crosley	17	Toyota	DAY	ATL	LVS	MAR	DOV	KAN	CLT	TEX	IOW	GTW	CHI	KEN	ELD; 13	POC	MCH	BRI	MSP	LVS	TAL					34th	122	
2018	GMS Racing	25	Chevy																				MAR; 17	TEX; 14	PHO; 14	HOM; 15	34th	122	
2019	Young's Motorsports	02	Chevy	DAY; 29	ATL; 11	LVS; 17	MAR; 23	TEX; 8	DOV; 18	KAN; 12	CLT; 13	TEX; 25	IOW; 19	GTW; 15	CHI; 12	KEN; 12	POC; 11	ELD; 8	MCH; 3	BRI; 24	MSP	LVS; 26	TAL; 31	MAR; 30	PHO; 15	HOM; 18	13th	454	

==== K&N Pro Series East ====
NASCAR K&N Pro Series East results
Year	Team	No.	Make	1	2	3	4	5	6	7	8	9	10	11	12	13	14	NKNPSEC	Pts	Ref
2016	HScott Motorsports	38	Chevy	NSM; 8	MOB; 1*	GRE; 8		VIR; 19	DOM; 11	STA; 17	COL; 15	NHA; 10	IOW; 8	GLN; 7	GRE; 11	NJM; 7	DOV; 7	3rd	475	
2016	HScott Motorsports	38	Toyota				BRI; 17											3rd	475	
2017	Rette Jones Racing	30	Ford	NSM; 23	GRE; 5	BRI; 13	SBO; 16	SBO; 12	MEM; 12	BLN; 7	TMP; 20	NHA; 6	IOW; 13	GLN; 12	LGY	NJM; 11	DOV; 3	10th	420	
2018	Rette Jones Racing	30	Ford	NSM; 9														2nd	490	
2018	MDM Motorsports	41	Toyota		BRI; 6													2nd	490	
2018	DGR-Crosley	54	Toyota			**LGY**; 1	SBO; 5	SBO; 2	MEM; 3	NJM; 11	TMP; 3	NHA; 4	**IOW**; 6	GLN; 15	GTW; 12	NHA; 12	DOV	2nd	490	

^{*} Season still in progress
^{1} Ineligible for series points

=== ARCA Menards Series ===
ARCA Menards Series results
Year	Team	No.	Make	1	2	3	4	5	6	7	8	9	10	11	12	13	14	15	16	17	18	19	20	AMSC	Pts	Ref
2015	Lira Motorsports	58	Ford	DAY	MOB	NSH	SLM	TAL	TOL	NJM	POC	MCH	CHI	WIN	IOW	IRP	POC	BLN	ISF; 12	DSF; 16				42nd	530	
2015	Lira Motorsports	38	Ford																		SLM; 4	KEN	KAN	42nd	530	
2017	Win-Tron Racing	33	Toyota	DAY	NSH	SLM	TAL	TOL; 25	ELK	POC	MCH	MAD	IOW	IRP	POC	WIN	ISF; 3	ROA	DSF; 18	SLM	CHI	KEN	KAN	43rd	460	
2018	Chad Bryant Racing	22	Ford	DAY	NSH; 6	SLM	TAL	TOL	CLT; 25	POC	MCH	MAD	GTW	CHI	IOW	ELK	POC	ISF	BLN	DSF	SLM	IRP	KAN	65th	310	
2019	Ken Schrader Racing	52	Ford	DAY; 12	FIF	SLM	TAL	NSH	TOL	CLT	POC	MCH	MAD	GTW	CHI	ELK	IOW	POC	ISF	DSF	SLM	IRP	KAN	64th	170	

=== CARS Late Model Stock Car Tour ===
(key) (Bold – Pole position awarded by qualifying time. Italics – Pole position earned by points standings or practice time. * – Most laps led. ** – All laps led.)

CARS Late Model Stock Car Tour results
Year	Team	No.	Make	1	2	3	4	5	6	7	8	9	10	CLMSCTC	Pts	Ref
2015	Jamie Yelton	1T	Ford	SNM; 23	ROU	HCY	SNM	TCM	MMS	ROU	CON	MYB	HCY	54th	10	
