= ComServe Wireless 150 =

2016 NASCAR race in Virginia, US

NASCAR K&N Pro Series East
- Venue: Dominion Raceway
- Location: Thornburg, Virginia; United States
- Corporate sponsor: ComServe Wireless
- First race: 2016
- Last race: 2016
- Distance: 60 miles (96.606 km)
- Laps: 150

Circuit information
- Surface: Asphalt
- Length: 0.400 mi (0.644 km)
- Turns: 4

The ComServe Wireless 150 was a NASCAR K&N Pro Series East race held in 2016 at Dominion Raceway. Spencer Davis won the race, driving for Ranier Racing with MDM.

== History ==
With its opening in 2016, Dominion Raceway sanctioned a NASCAR K&N Pro Series East race on its opening weekend. Spencer Davis won the race in a close finish over Justin Haley.

== Past winners ==
Year	Date	No.	Driver	Team	Manufacturer	Race distance		Race time	Average speed (mph)
Year	Date	No.	Driver	Team	Manufacturer	Laps	Miles (km)	Race time	Average speed (mph)
2016	May 30	41	Spencer Davis	Ranier Racing with MDM	Chevrolet	150	60 (96.606)	1:06:40	54
