= Jefferson Racing =

American stock car racing team

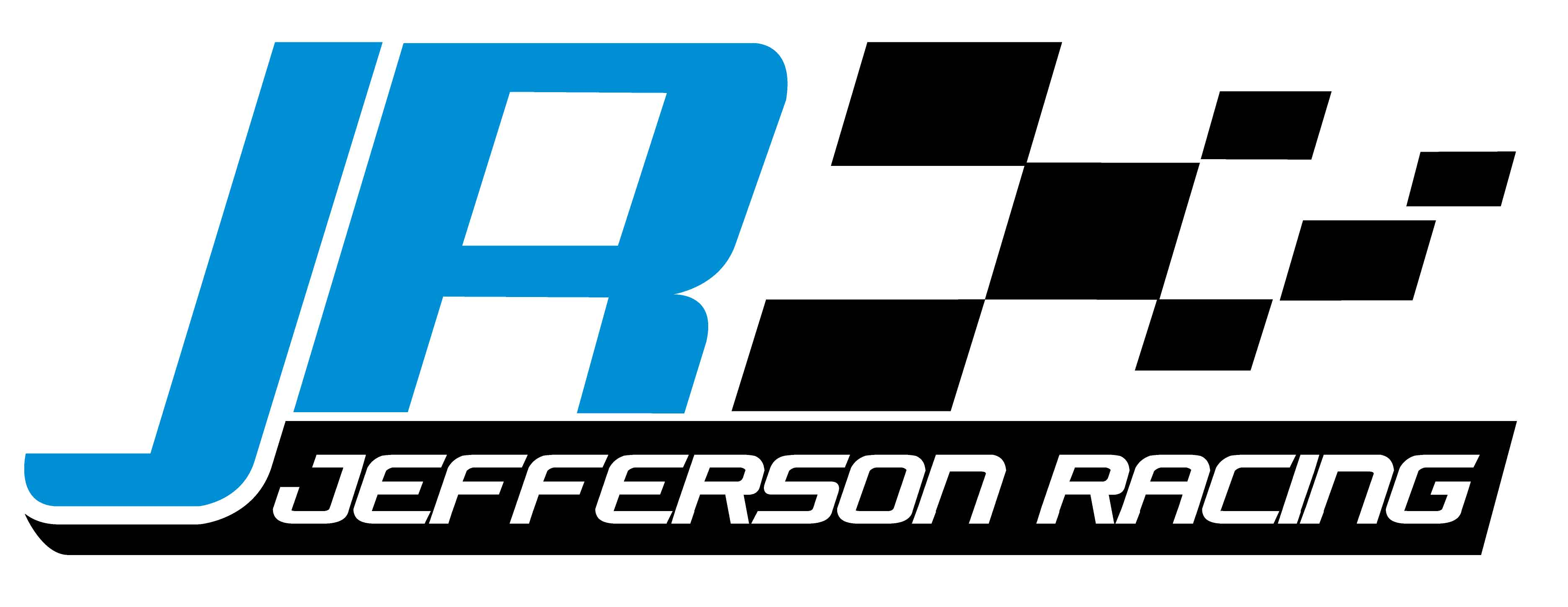
- Owner: Jeff Jefferson
- Base: Naches, Washington
- Series: Northwest Super Late Model Series
- Race drivers: Northwest Super Late Model Series: 7. Bryce Bezanson; 42. Kole Raz (part-time)
- Manufacturer: Ford
- Opened: 2015

Career
- Debut: NASCAR K&N Pro Series West: 2015 NAPA Auto Parts 150 (Bakersfield); NASCAR K&N Pro Series East: 2015 The Hart to Heart Breast Cancer Foundation 150 (New Smyrna Speedway); Northwest Super Late Model Series: Central Welding Supply 125 (Evergreen Speedway)
- Latest race: NASCAR K&N Pro Series West: 2020 ENEOS 125 presented by NAPA Auto Parts (Irwindale Speedway); NASCAR K&N Pro Series East: 2019 Great Outdoors RV Superstore 100 (Watkins Glen); Northwest Super Late Model Series: 2021 Neal Newberry 125 (Wenatchee Valley Super Oval)
- Races competed: Total: 184; NASCAR K&N Pro Series West: 127; NASCAR K&N Pro Series East: 46; Northwest Super Late Model Series: 21
- Drivers' Championships: Total: 0 NASCAR K&N Pro Series West: 0 NASCAR K&N Pro Series East: 0 Northwest Super Late Model Series: 0
- Race victories: Total: 13; NASCAR K&N Pro Series West: 8 NASCAR K&N Pro Series East: 5 Northwest Super Late Model Series: 0
- Pole positions: Total: 5 NASCAR K&N Pro Series West: 5 NASCAR K&N Pro Series East: 0 Northwest Super Late Model Series: 0

Jefferson Racing is an American stock car racing team that currently competes in the Northwest Super Late Model Series. The team was founded in 2015 by Jeff Jefferson, and they primarily field the No. 7 Ford Fusion full-time for Bryce Bezanson, and the No. 42 Ford Fusion part-time for Kole Raz. They previously competed in the NASCAR K&N Pro Series West from 2015 to 2020, and the NASCAR K&N Pro Series East from 2015 to 2019, under Jefferson Pitts Racing, and in 2020, under Jefferson Racing.

== History ==
The team was founded in 2015, when former crew chiefs, Jeff Jefferson and Jerry Pitts, bought the assets and equipment of former NASCAR K&N Pro Series West team, Gene Price Motorsports. Jefferson was a former driver in the NASCAR AutoZone Elite Division, Northwest Series, where he won the championship from 2004 to 2006.

== ARCA Menards Series West ==
=== Car No. 3 history ===
Austin Dillon (2019)

Austin Dillon, the grandson of Richard Childress, would do a one-off race for Jefferson Pitts Racing at Sonoma Raceway in 2019, in the no. 3 car, his number in the Cup Series. He would start eleventh and finish third.

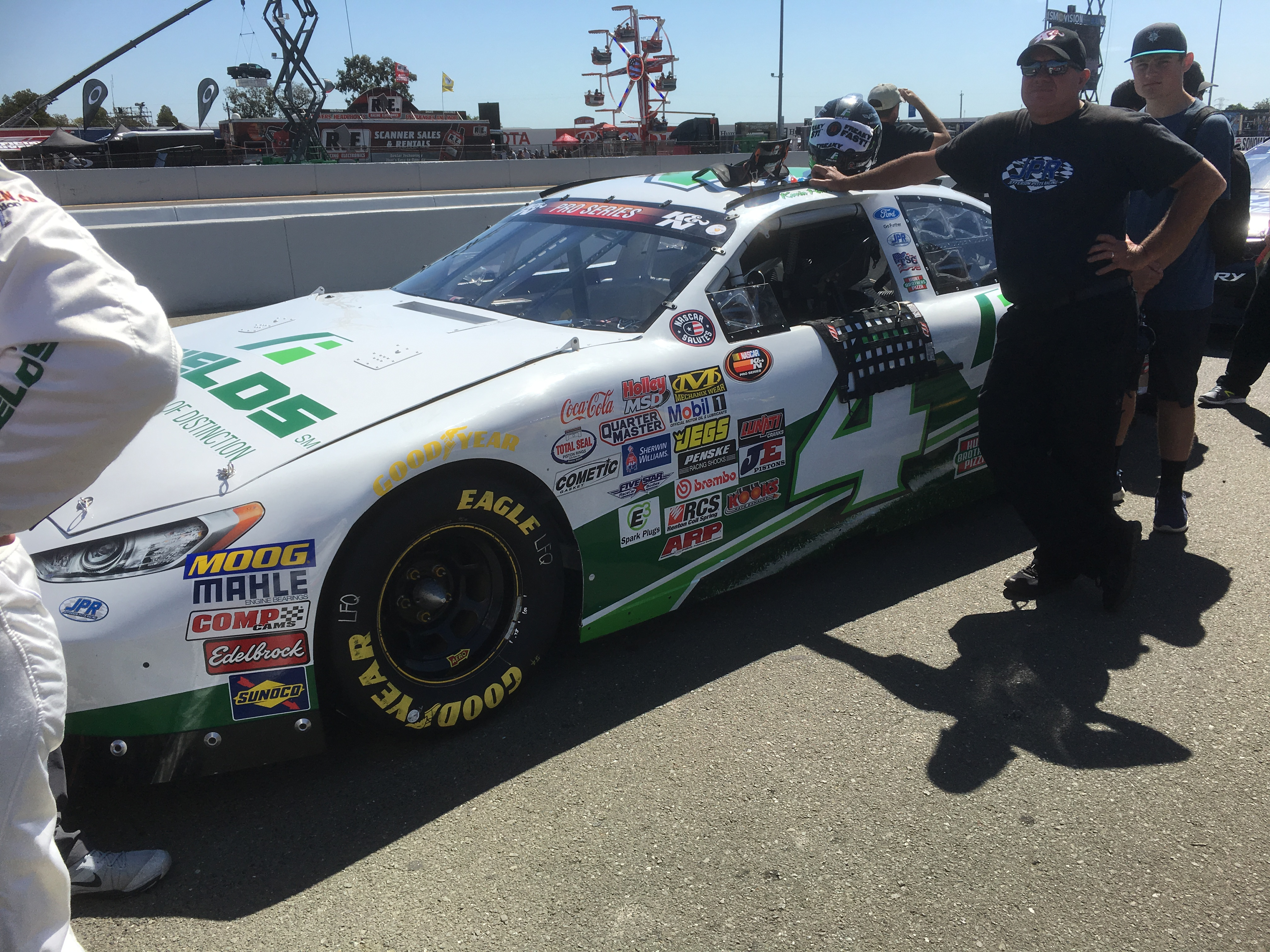
Harvick and his race winning car at Sonoma Raceway in 2017.

=== Car No. 4 history ===
Kevin Harvick (2017)

2014 NASCAR Sprint Cup Series champion, Kevin Harvick, drove in a one-off race at Kern County Raceway Park, his hometrack. He would start on the pole, and lead 132 laps, until getting passed by Cole Rouse. Harvick would finish in fourth.

He drove for another race at Sonoma Raceway later that year. He would start sixth and lead 23 laps, winning the race.

=== Car No. 7 history ===
Noah Gragson (2015-2016)

INEX legends car racing driver Noah Gragson, would sign with Jefferson Pitts Racing to run full-time in NASCAR K&N Pro Series West in 2015, running for Rookie of the Year and the championship. For his first start at Kern County Raceway Park, he would start eighth and would finish third. Gragson would capture his first career win for the team at Tucson Speedway, starting in 18th and leading 23 laps to win. Gragson would get his second win of the season at Meridian Speedway, starting from the pole, and leading 176 to win it. Gragson ended the season with seven top fives and eleven top tens, ranking second in the points standings, and winning Rookie of the Year.

He would continue to drive for Jefferson Pitts Racing full-time in 2016, finishing inside the top ten in twelve of the fourteen races of the season. He ended the season with two wins, eight top fives and twelve top tens, finishing third in the point standings.

Will Rodgers (2017)

NASCAR Next driver, Will Rodgers, would drive for a full-time season with Jefferson Pitts Racing in 2017, earning nine top fives and twelve top tens, finishing fifth in the standings, and taking Rookie of the Year honors.

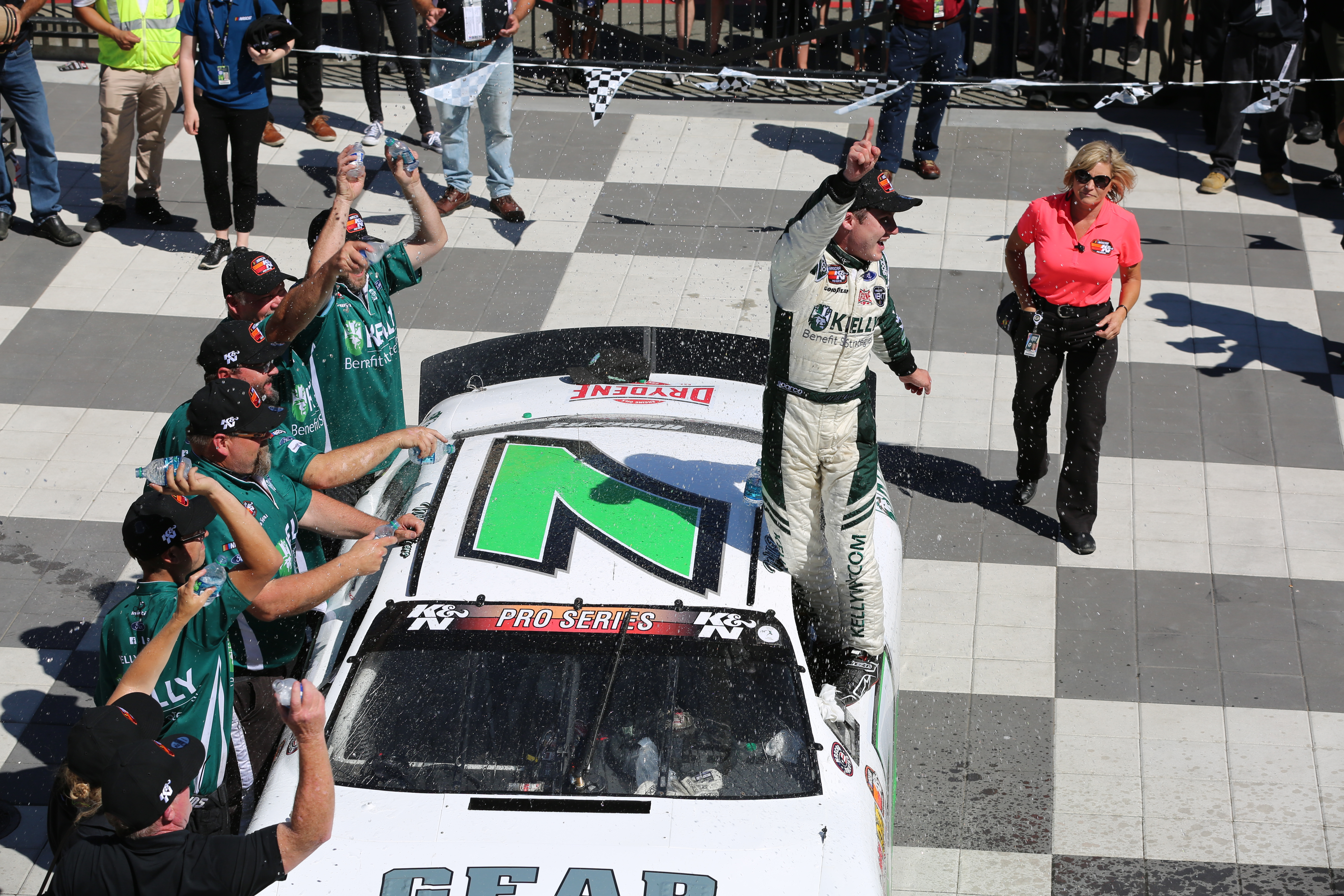
Rodgers celebrating after winning at Sonoma Raceway in 2018.

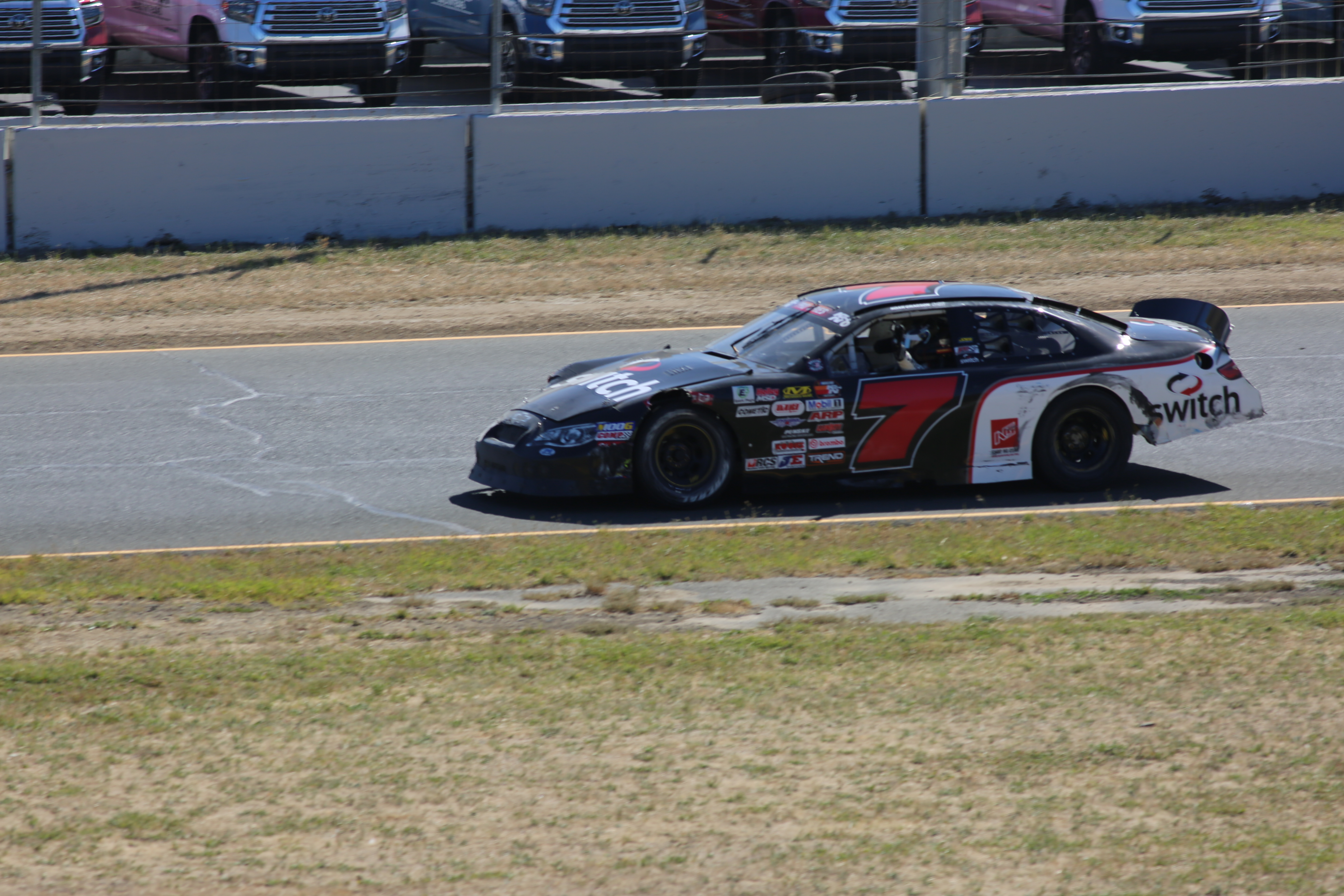
Gragson with his race winning car at Sonoma Raceway in 2019.

Multiple drivers (2018-2019)

Jefferson Pitts Racing would move into a part-time schedule for the 2018 season, with Will Rodgers, Devin Dodson, Vanessa Robinson, and Cole Keatts driving in select races in the team. Rodgers would drive for two races, Dodson for three races, Robinson for one race, and Keatts for two races. Will Rodgers would earn his first career NASCAR K&N Pro Series West win at Sonoma Raceway, finishing in front of five NASCAR Cup Series drivers for the win.

The team returned to a part-time schedule for the 2019 season, increasing from four to six drivers under select races. Noah Gragson would make his return to the team that season, and would get his fifth NASCAR K&N Pro Series West win at Sonoma Raceway, after the race leader, his teammate for the race, Ryan Preece, got black flagged for a restart violation. On August 14, 2019, Jefferson Pitts Racing announced that they will be separating into two separate teams for the 2020 ARCA Menards Series West season. Jerry Pitts, the former owner, would start his own team called JP Racing, and would move his base to Pahrump, Nevada, while Jeff Jefferson will remain in Naches, Washington.

The 7 car would return next season, under JP Racing, and would continue to run part-time with select drivers.

=== Car No. 27 history ===
Gracin Raz (2015-2016)

Jefferson Pitts Racing would have their second full-time entry in 2015, with Oregon driver, Gracin Raz. He would compete for the Rookie of the Year title with his teammate, Noah Gragson. Raz would end the season with one win, nine top tens, and six top fives. He ranked fourth in the point standings, and would finish third in the Rookie of the Year standings.

Raz returned to a second full-time season in 2016. This would end up being Raz's final full-time ride with Jefferson Pitts Racing. Raz would finish off the season with ten top tens and eight top fives, finishing fifth in the point standings.

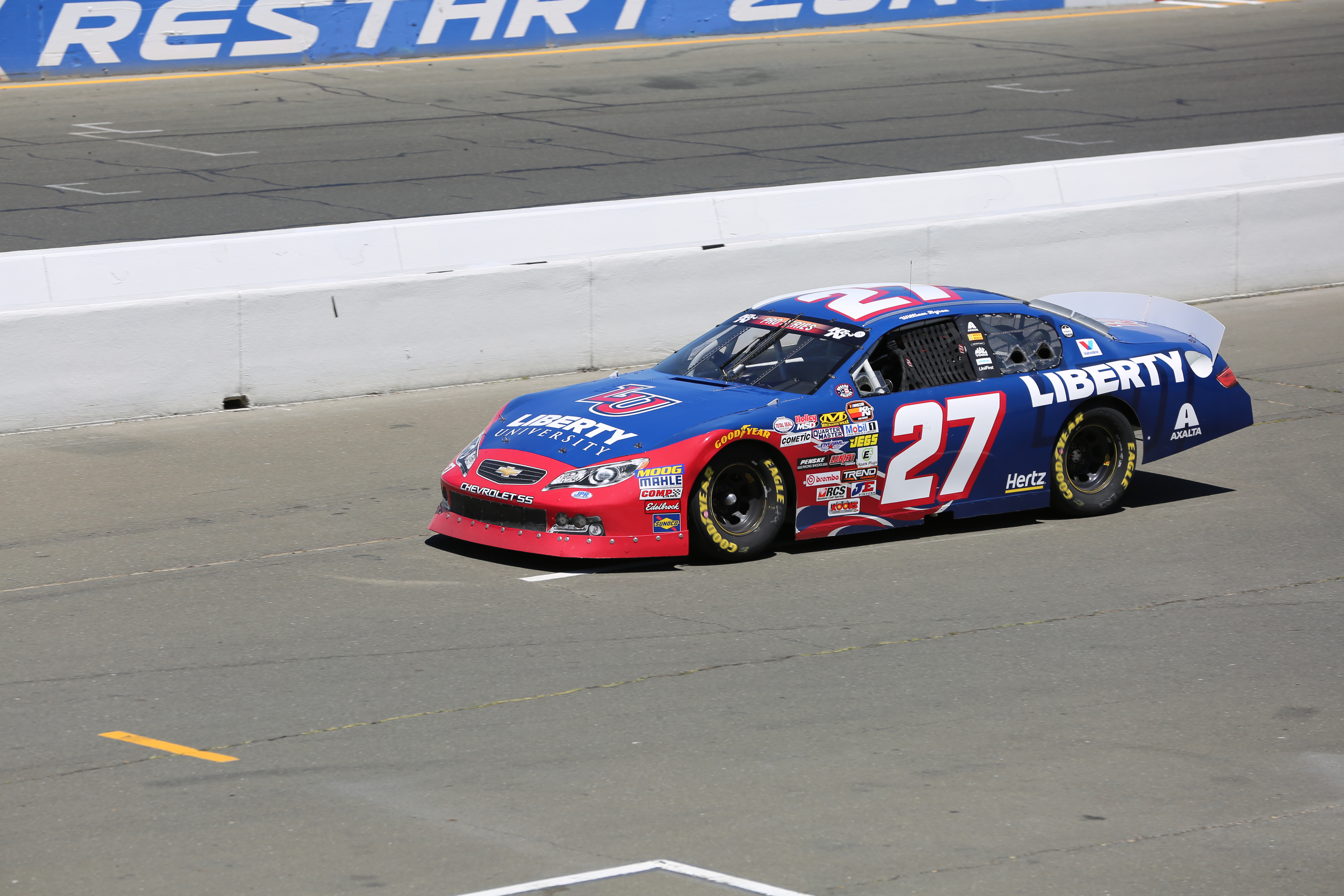
Byron's car at Sonoma Raceway in 2018.

Multiple drivers (2017-2019)

Jefferson Pitts would have six drivers running select races in 2017, with one of them being the 2020 NASCAR Gander RV & Outdoors Truck Series champion, Sheldon Creed.

For 2018, there would be seven drivers running for select races, including Cup Series driver William Byron, and the two time ARCA Menards Series East champion, Sam Mayer.

2019 would be the final season that Jefferson Pitts would field the No. 27 car. They would move into a part-time schedule, with Cole Cabrera, Devin Dodson, Buddy Shepherd, and Matt Levin driving in select races.

=== Car No. 42 history ===
Jeff Jefferson would move over and field the No. 42 car in the 2020 ARCA Menards Series West, after parting ways with former owner, Jerry Pitts. He would only field the car for three races. Will Rodgers would drive at the Utah Motorsports Campus doubleheader races, and Brittney Zamora would drive the car at the Irwindale Event Center. Since the season ended, Jefferson Racing never returned to the ARCA Menards Series West in 2021.

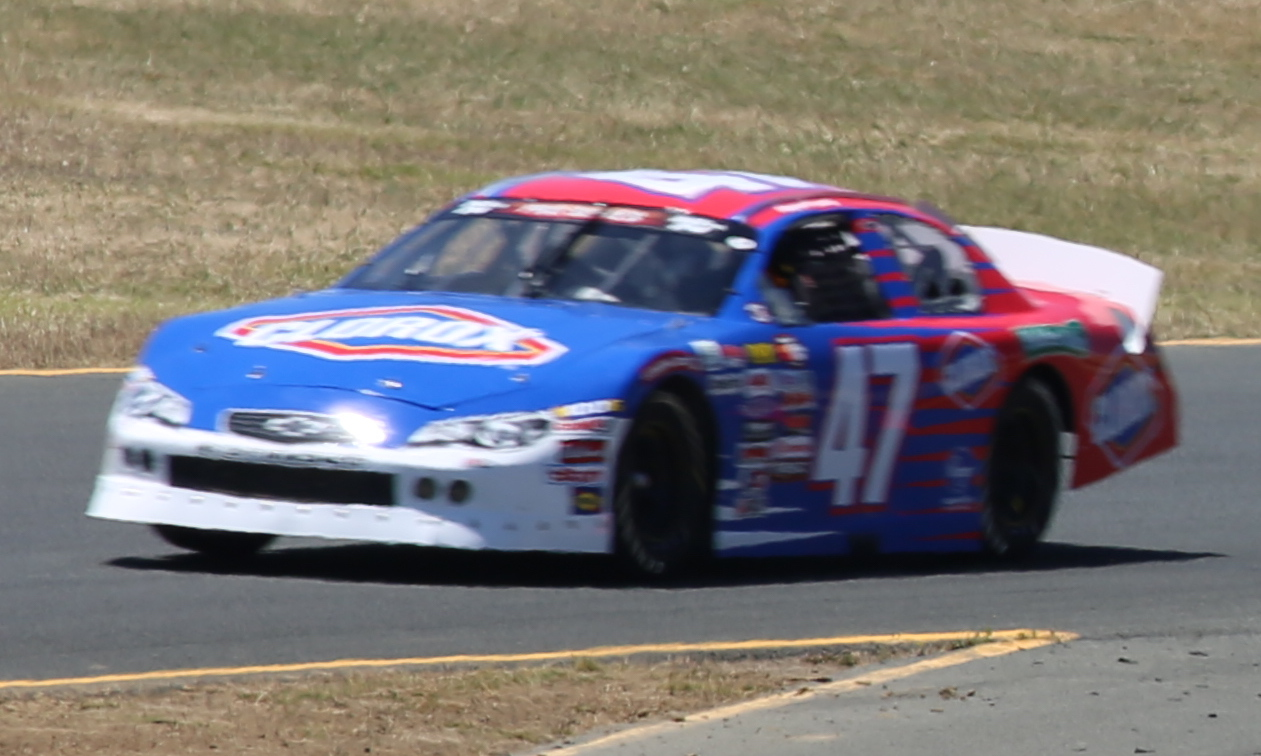
Preece's car at Sonoma Raceway in 2019.

=== Car No. 47 history ===
Ryan Preece (2019)

Ryan Preece would drive for a one-off race at Sonoma Raceway in 2019, driving the No. 47, the number he also ran in the Cup Series. Preece started in 4th, and would lead the most laps. Preece was in the lead on the final restart, but would get black flagged because of a restart violation. He would lose the race and be credited with a 20th-place finish. His teammate, Gragson, would win instead.

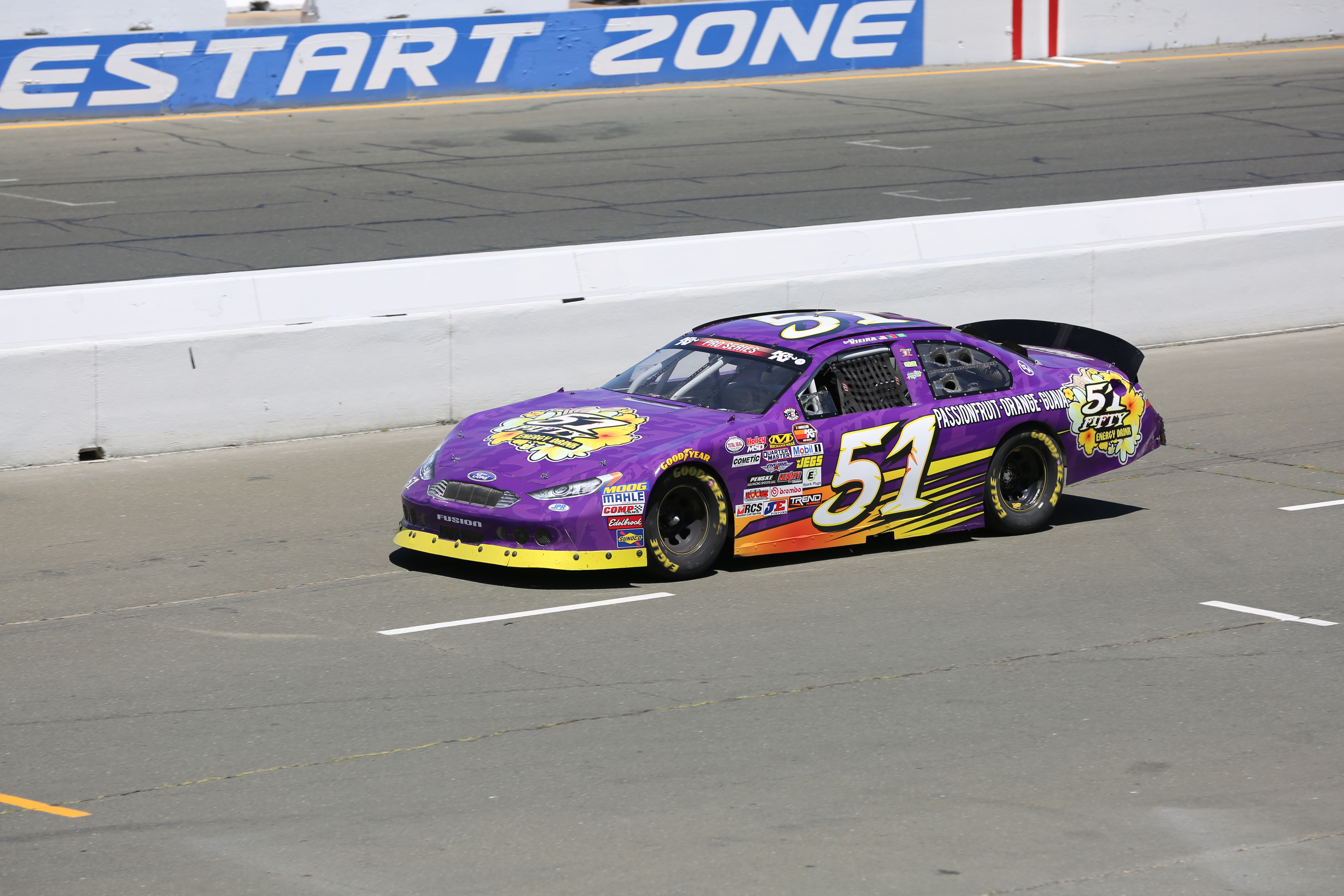
Vieira's car at Sonoma Raceway in 2018.

=== Car No. 51 history ===
Carlos Vieira (2018)

Jefferson Pitts would field the No. 51 car for one race, with driver Carlos Vieira, in 2018. He would race at Sonoma Raceway, starting 19th and finishing 22nd due to an early race wreck.

=== Car No. 55 history ===
Multiple drivers (2015-2019)

Jefferson would field the 55 car for several drivers in select races for 2015, and eventually through 2019. Notable drivers who drove in the car are Dalton Sargeant, Matt Tifft, and Sheldon Creed.

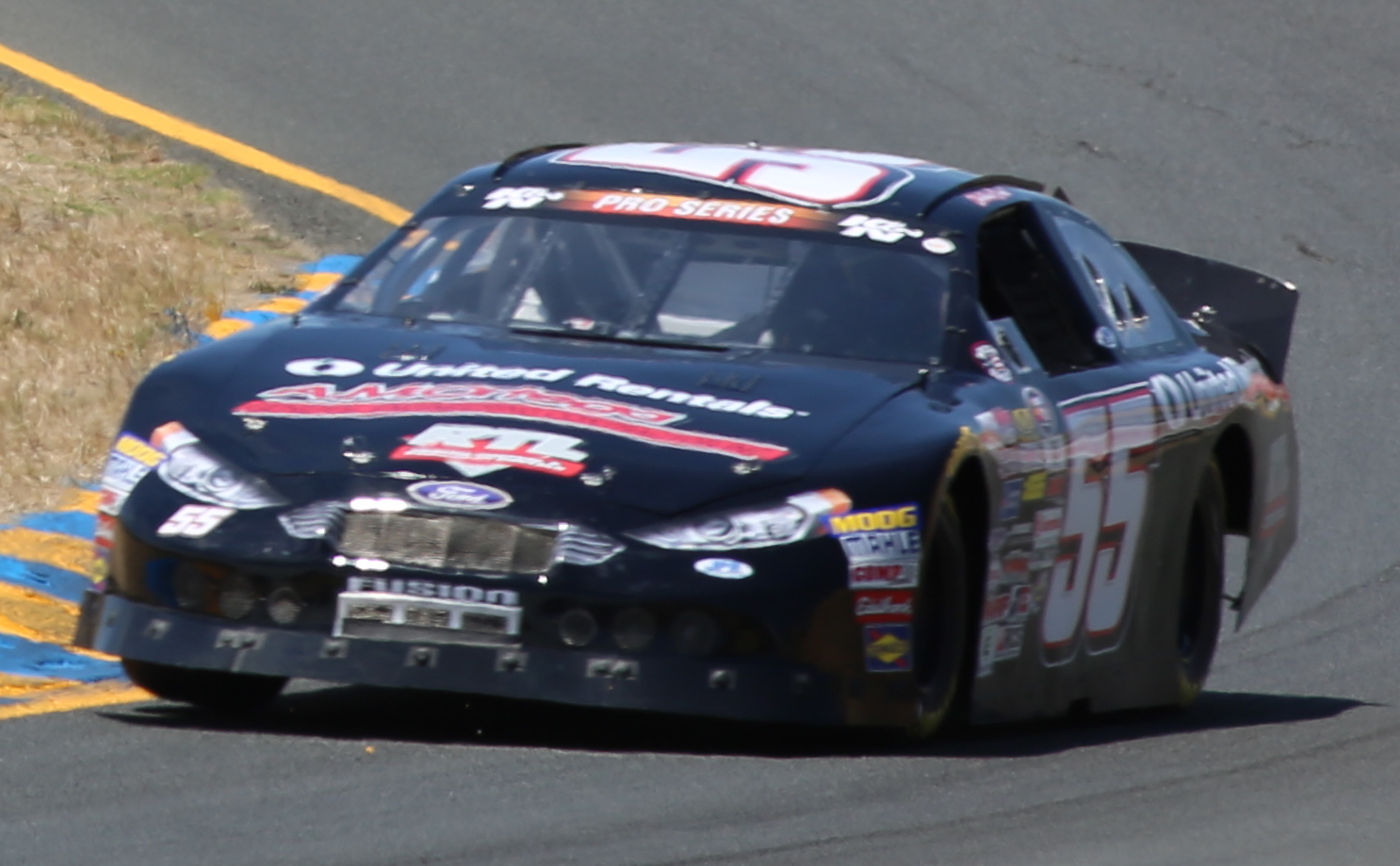
Creed's car at Sonoma Raceway in 2017.

=== Car No. 59 history ===
Reid Lanpher (2018)

Reid Lanpher would drive in a one-off race in the No. 59 car at Kern County Raceway Park. He would start and finish in the tenth position.

=== Car No. 77 history ===
Austin Herzog (2018)

Austin Herzog was expected to drive the 55 car at Kern County Raceway Park, but instead would drive in the 77 car for that race. Herzog started eleventh and finished in eighth.

== NASCAR K&N Pro Series East ==
=== Car No. 7 history ===
Noah Gragson (2015)

The team would make their debut in the NASCAR K&N Pro Series East in 2015. Noah Gragson drove the seven car at Watkins Glen International, starting ninth and finishing tenth.

Will Rodgers (2017)

In 2017, Will Rodgers made two starts in the East series, and would win in both of his races that season, Watkins Glen International and the New Jersey Motorsports Park.

Dylan Murry (2019)

2019 would be the last year that the team would make a start in the East series. IMSA driver, Dylan Murry, would drive the car at Watkins Glen, starting seventh and finishing eighth.

=== Car No. 27 history ===
Gracin Raz (2016)

The team fielded the 27 car in 2016, with Gracin Raz as the driver. Raz drove for three select races, finishing twelfth, seventh, fifteenth respectably.

Multiple drivers (2017-2018)

Matt Tifft and Max Tullman would each run one race in the 2017 NASCAR K&N Pro Series East for Jeff Jefferson, both of them would finish tenth and ninth respectably. Five drivers would drive in select races for the 2018 season, including Max Tullman, Will Rodgers, Sam Mayer, and Bubba Wallace. This was the last season that Jefferson fielded the 27.

=== Car No. 55 history ===
Multiple drivers (2015)

The 55 car would make its debut at Watkins Glen in 2015, with Dylan Lupton as the driver. Lupton would finish in fourth after starting eighth. Noah Gragson drove the car at Richmond International Raceway, and would finish in tenth.

Noah Gragson (2016)

Noah Gragson would pilot the 55 car for a full-time season in 2016, which would be the team's first full-time schedule in the East series. For some races, he would drive in the seven car, and Spencer Davis would drive the car at Iowa Speedway. Gragson would have an up and down season, getting wins at Stafford Motor Speedway and the New Jersey Motorsports Park. He ended the season with six top tens and four top fives, finishing fifth in the final standings.

Hanna Zellers (2017)

Hanna Zellers made her NASCAR K&N Pro Series East debut at the New Jersey Motorsports Park in 2017, starting thirteenth and finishing twelfth.

=== Car No. 72 history ===
Gracin Raz (2015)

The team would do a one-off race with the 72 car at Richmond International Speedway, with Gracin Raz piloting the car. Raz started in 33rd and finished in 34th due to a rear end issue with five laps to go.

== Northwest Super Late Model Series ==
=== Car No. 7 history ===
Bryce Bezanson (2019-present)

Bryce Bezanson would drive a part-time schedule for the 2019 season, and eventually would go full-time in 2021. Bezanson would make three starts in 2019, finishing thirteenth, ninth, and fifteenth respectably.

Bryce would run a full season in 2020 (which was only two races). He would finish fifth and nineteenth respectably.

For the 2021 season, Bryce would continue to run full-time for the team, this time for eight races. He would get seven top tens and two top fives, finishing second in the overall point standings.

=== Car No. 42 history ===
Kole Raz (2021-present)

Kole Raz would drive for six out of the eight races in the 2021 Northwest Super Late Model Series, while also competing full-time in the SRL Spears Southwest Tour. Raz would get three top tens and two top fives, finishing sixth in the overall point standings.
