= 2019 Buckle Up in Your Truck 225 =

Race details
- Race 13 of 23 in the 2019 NASCAR Gander Outdoors Truck Series season
- Layout of Kentucky Speedway
- Date: July 11, 2019
- Location: Kentucky Speedway in Sparta, Kentucky
- Course length: 2.4 km (1.5 miles)
- Distance: 150 laps, 225 mi (362 km)

Pole position
Driver	Grant Enfinger	ThorSport Racing
- Time: 29.678

Most laps led
Driver	Tyler Ankrum	DGR-Crosley
- Laps: 40

Winner
No. 17	Tyler Ankrum	DGR-Crosley

Television in the United States
- Network: FS1

Radio in the United States
- Radio: MRN

The 2019 Buckle Up in Your Truck 225 was a NASCAR Gander Outdoors Truck Series race held on July 11, 2019, at Kentucky Speedway in Sparta, Kentucky. Contested over 150 laps on the 1.5-mile (2.4 km) tri-oval speedway, it was the 13th race of the 2019 NASCAR Gander Outdoors Truck Series season.

== Background ==
=== Track ===
The track is a 1.5-mile (2.4 km) tri-oval speedway in Sparta, Kentucky, which has hosted ARCA, NASCAR and Indy Racing League racing annually since it opened in 2000. The track is currently owned and operated by Speedway Motorsports. The speedway has a grandstand capacity of 69,000.

== Entry list ==
No.	Driver	Team	Manufacturer
02	Tyler Dippel (R)	Young's Motorsports	Chevrolet
2	Sheldon Creed (R)	GMS Racing	Chevrolet
3	Jordan Anderson	Jordan Anderson Racing	Chevrolet
4	Todd Gilliland	Kyle Busch Motorsports	Toyota
6	Norm Benning	Norm Benning Racing	Chevrolet
8	Camden Murphy	NEMCO Motorsports	Chevrolet
9	Codie Rohrbaugh	CR7 Motorsports	Chevrolet
10	Jennifer Jo Cobb	Jennifer Jo Cobb Racing	Chevrolet
11	Spencer Davis	Rette Jones Racing	Toyota
12	Gus Dean (R)	Young's Motorsports	Chevrolet
13	Johnny Sauter	ThorSport Racing	Ford
15	Dylan Lupton	DGR-Crosley	Toyota
16	Austin Hill	Hattori Racing Enterprises	Toyota
17	Tyler Ankrum	DGR-Crosley	Toyota
18	Harrison Burton (R)	Kyle Busch Motorsports	Toyota
20	Spencer Boyd (R)	Young's Motorsports	Chevrolet
22	Austin Wayne Self	AM Racing	Chevrolet
24	Brett Moffitt	GMS Racing	Chevrolet
30	Brennan Poole (R)	On Point Motorsports	Toyota
33	Mason Massey	Reaume Brothers Racing	Chevrolet
34	Josh Bilicki (i)	Reaume Brothers Racing	Chevrolet
42	Chad Finley	Chad Finley Racing	Chevrolet
44	Jeb Burton (i)	Niece Motorsports	Chevrolet
45	Ross Chastain	Niece Motorsports	Chevrolet
49	Ray Ciccarelli	CMI Motorsports	Chevrolet
51	Brandon Jones (i)	Kyle Busch Motorsports	Toyota
52	Stewart Friesen	Halmar Friesen Racing	Chevrolet
54	Natalie Decker (R)	DGR-Crosley	Toyota
56	Tyler Hill	Hill Motorsports	Chevrolet
68	Clay Greenfield	Clay Greenfield Motorsports	Toyota
87	Joe Nemechek	NEMCO Motorsports	Chevrolet
88	Matt Crafton	ThorSport Racing	Ford
98	Grant Enfinger	ThorSport Racing	Ford
99	Ben Rhodes	ThorSport Racing	Ford

== Practice ==
=== First practice ===
Harrison Burton was the fastest in the first practice session with a time of 29.920 seconds and a speed of 180.481 mph (290.456 km/h).

Pos	No.	Driver	Team	Manufacturer	Time	Speed
1	18	Harrison Burton	Kyle Busch Motorsports	Toyota	29.920	180.481
2	2	Sheldon Creed	GMS Racing	Chevrolet	30.095	179.432
3	13	Johnny Sauter	ThorSport Racing	Ford	30.111	179.336

=== Final practice ===
Brett Moffitt was the fastest in the final practice session with a time of 29.693 seconds and a speed of 180.481 mph (290.456 km/h).

Pos	No.	Driver	Team	Manufacturer	Time	Speed
1	24	Brett Moffitt	GMS Racing	Chevrolet	29.693	180.481
2	98	Grant Enfinger	ThorSport Racing	Ford	29.817	181.105
3	2	Sheldon Creed	GMS Racing	Chevrolet	29.864	180.820

== Qualifying ==
Grant Enfinger scored the pole for the race with a time of 29.678 seconds and a speed of 181.953 mph (292.825 km/h).

=== Qualifying results ===
Pos	No	Driver	Team	Manufacturer	Time
1	98	Grant Enfinger	ThorSport Racing	Ford	29.678
2	2	Sheldon Creed (R)	GMS Racing	Chevrolet	29.706
3	4	Todd Gilliland	Kyle Busch Motorsports	Toyota	29.721
4	88	Matt Crafton	ThorSport Racing	Ford	29.931
5	45	Ross Chastain	Niece Motorsports	Chevrolet	29.941
6	18	Harrison Burton (R)	Kyle Busch Motorsports	Toyota	29.951
7	24	Brett Moffitt	GMS Racing	Chevrolet	29.995
8	99	Ben Rhodes	ThorSport Racing	Ford	30.010
9	17	Tyler Ankrum	DGR-Crosley	Toyota	30.032
10	30	Brennan Poole (R)	On Point Motorsports	Toyota	30.116
11	13	Johnny Sauter	ThorSport Racing	Ford	30.122
12	42	Chad Finley	Chad Finley Racing	Chevrolet	30.153
13	12	Gus Dean (R)	Young's Motorsports	Chevrolet	30.239
14	02	Tyler Dippel (R)	Young's Motorsports	Chevrolet	30.256
15	3	Jordan Anderson	Jordan Anderson Racing	Chevrolet	30.367
16	22	Austin Wayne Self	AM Racing	Chevrolet	30.389
17	54	Natalie Decker (R)	DGR-Crosley	Toyota	30.431
18	87	Joe Nemechek	NEMCO Motorsports	Chevrolet	30.445
19	9	Codie Rohrbaugh	CR7 Motorsports	Chevrolet	30.554
20	15	Dylan Lupton	DGR-Crosley	Toyota	30.562
21	11	Spencer Davis	Rette Jones Racing	Toyota	30.690
22	16	Austin Hill	Hattori Racing Enterprises	Toyota	30.759
23	33	Mason Massey	Reaume Brothers Racing	Chevrolet	30.772
24	68	Clay Greenfield	Clay Greenfield Motorsports	Toyota	30.901
25	20	Spencer Boyd (R)	Young's Motorsports	Chevrolet	30.928
26	56	Tyler Hill	Hill Motorsports	Chevrolet	30.974
27	51	Brandon Jones (i)	Kyle Busch Motorsports	Toyota	31.030
28	44	Jeb Burton (i)	Niece Motorsports	Chevrolet	31.086
29	8	Camden Murphy	NEMCO Motorsports	Chevrolet	31.225
30	34	Josh Bilicki (i)	Reaume Brothers Racing	Chevrolet	32.378
31	10	Jennifer Jo Cobb	Jennifer Jo Cobb Racing	Chevrolet	32.590
32	52	Stewart Friesen	Halmar Friesen Racing	Chevrolet	32.831
Did not qualify
33	49	Ray Ciccarelli	CMI Motorsports	Chevrolet	32.048
34	6	Norm Benning	Norm Benning Racing	Chevrolet	32.658

== Race ==
=== Summary ===
Grant Enfinger started on pole, but Sheldon Creed took the lead within the first turn and pulled away. He eventually held a two-second lead over Enfinger and won Stage 1.

With 5 laps remaining in Stage 2, Enfinger and Brandon Jones tangled together while battling for the lead. Enfinger dove underneath Jones but lost control and ended up pulling them both into the outside wall. Matt Crafton won the stage under caution. Tyler Ankrum passed Crafton soon after the caution and dominated until he had to pit and was overtaken by Brett Moffitt. He then led for 10 laps until Dylan Lupton and Crafton both took the lead on separate occasions.

Brett Moffitt retook the lead on lap 125, but had to pit for fuel on the final lap. This gave the lead to Ankrum, who ultimately led a race-high 40 laps. Ankrum won the race with a 7-second lead over runner-up Stewart Friesen (who had to start in a backup truck).

=== Stage Results ===
Stage One Laps: 35

Pos	No	Driver	Team	Manufacturer	Points
1	2	Sheldon Creed (R)	GMS Racing	Chevrolet	10
2	98	Grant Enfinger	ThorSport Racing	Ford	9
3	4	Todd Gilliland	Kyle Busch Motorsports	Toyota	8
4	17	Tyler Ankrum (R)	DGR-Crosley	Toyota	7
5	45	Ross Chastain	Niece Motorsports	Chevrolet	6
6	18	Harrison Burton (R)	Kyle Busch Motorsports	Toyota	5
7	24	Brett Moffitt	GMS Racing	Chevrolet	4
8	51	Brandon Jones (i)	Kyle Busch Motorsports	Toyota	0
9	30	Brennan Poole (R)	On Point Motorsports	Toyota	2
10	13	Johnny Sauter	ThorSport Racing	Ford	1

Stage Two Laps: 35

Pos	No	Driver	Team	Manufacturer	Points
1	88	Matt Crafton	ThorSport Racing	Ford	10
2	45	Ross Chastain	Niece Motorsports	Chevrolet	9
3	15	Dylan Lupton	DGR-Crosley	Toyota	8
4	17	Tyler Ankrum (R)	DGR-Crosley	Toyota	7
5	11	Spencer Davis	Rette Jones Racing	Toyota	6
6	52	Stewart Friesen	Halmar Friesen Racing	Chevrolet	5
7	99	Ben Rhodes	ThorSport Racing	Ford	4
8	22	Austin Wayne Self	AM Racing	Chevrolet	3
9	2	Sheldon Creed (R)	GMS Racing	Chevrolet	2
10	30	Brennan Poole (R)	On Point Motorsports	Toyota	1

=== Final Stage Results ===
Stage Three Laps: 80

Pos	Grid	No	Driver	Team	Manufacturer	Laps	Points
1	9	17	Tyler Ankrum (R)	DGR-Crosley	Toyota	150	40
2	32	52	Stewart Friesen	Halmar Friesen Racing	Chevrolet	150	35
3	6	18	Harrison Burton (R)	Kyle Busch Motorsports	Toyota	150	34
4	5	45	Ross Chastain	Niece Motorsports	Chevrolet	150	33
5	20	15	Dylan Lupton	DGR-Crosley	Toyota	150	32
6	16	22	Austin Wayne Self	AM Racing	Chevrolet	150	31
7	7	24	Brett Moffitt	GMS Racing	Chevrolet	150	30
8	21	11	Spencer Davis	Rette Jones Racing	Toyota	149	35
9	28	44	Jeb Burton (i)	Niece Motorsports	Chevrolet	149	0
10	11	13	Johnny Sauter	ThorSport Racing	Ford	148	27
11	26	56	Tyler Hill	Hill Motorsports	Chevrolet	148	26
12	14	02	Tyler Dippel (R)	Young's Motorsports	Chevrolet	148	25
13	4	88	Matt Crafton	ThorSport Racing	Ford	148	24
14	19	9	Codie Rohrbaugh	CR7 Motorsports	Chevrolet	147	23
15	10	30	Brennan Poole (R)	On Point Motorsports	Toyota	147	22
16	24	68	Clay Greenfield	Clay Greenfield Motorsports	Toyota	147	21
17	3	4	Todd Gilliland	Kyle Busch Motorsports	Toyota	145	20
18	23	33	Mason Massey	Reaume Brothers Racing	Chevrolet	145	19
19	8	99	Ben Rhodes	ThorSport Racing	Ford	141	18
20	30	34	Josh Bilicki (i)	Reaume Brothers Racing	Chevrolet	140	0
21	2	2	Sheldon Creed (R)	GMS Racing	Chevrolet	131	16
22	31	10	Jennifer Jo Cobb	Jennifer Jo Cobb Racing	Chevrolet	127	15
23	27	51	Brandon Jones (i)	Kyle Busch Motorsports	Toyota	64	0
24	1	98	Grant Enfinger	ThorSport Racing	Ford	64	13
25	13	12	Gus Dean (R)	Young's Motorsports	Chevrolet	63	12
26	12	42	Chad Finley	Chad Finley Racing	Chevrolet	55	11
27	17	54	Natalie Decker (R)	DGR-Crosley	Toyota	53	10
28	29	8	Camden Murphy	NEMCO Motorsports	Chevrolet	43	9
29	25	20	Spencer Boyd (R)	Young's Motorsports	Chevrolet	41	8
30	15	3	Jordan Anderson	Jordan Anderson Racing	Chevrolet	41	7
31	22	16	Austin Hill	Hattori Racing Enterprises	Toyota	28	6
32	18	87	Joe Nemechek	NEMCO Motorsports	Chevrolet	17	5

Previous race: 2019 Camping World 225	NASCAR Gander Outdoors Truck Series; 2019 season	Next race: 2019 Gander RV 150
