= 2019 Camping World 225 =

Race details
- Race 12 of 23 in the 2019 NASCAR Gander Outdoors Truck Series season
- Date: June 28, 2019
- Location: Chicagoland Speedway in Joliet, Illinois
- Course: Permanent racing facility
- Course length: 1.5 miles (2.414 km)
- Distance: 150 laps, 225 mi (362.102 km)

Pole position
Driver	Austin Hill	Hattori Racing Enterprises
- Time: 30.572

Most laps led
Driver	Brett Moffitt	GMS Racing
- Laps: 72

Winner
No. 24	Brett Moffitt	GMS Racing

Television in the United States
- Network: FS1

Radio in the United States
- Radio: MRN

The 2019 Camping World 225 was a NASCAR Gander Outdoors Truck Series race held on June 28, 2019, at Chicagoland Speedway in Joliet, Illinois. Contested over 150 laps on the 1.500 mi (2.414 km) intermediate speedway, it was the 12th race of the 2019 NASCAR Gander Outdoors Truck Series season.

== Background ==
=== Track ===
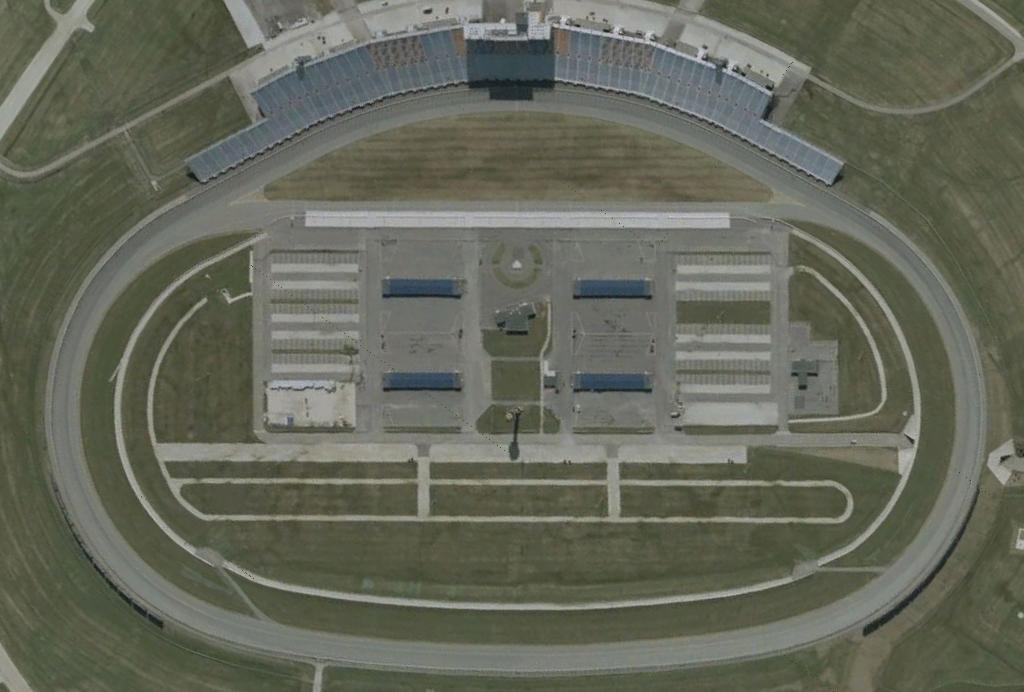
Chicagoland Speedway, the track where the race was held.

Chicagoland Speedway is a 1.5 miles (2.4 km) tri-oval speedway in Joliet, Illinois, southwest of Chicago. The speedway opened in 2001 and currently hosts NASCAR races. Until 2011, the speedway also hosted the IndyCar Series, recording numerous close finishes, including the closest finish in IndyCar history. The speedway is owned and operated by International Speedway Corporation and is located adjacent to Route 66 Raceway.

== Entry list ==
No.	Driver	Team	Manufacturer
0	Joey Gase (i)	Jennifer Jo Cobb Racing	Chevrolet
1	B. J. McLeod (i)	Vizion Motorsports	Toyota
02	Tyler Dippel (R)	Young's Motorsports	Chevrolet
2	Sheldon Creed (R)	GMS Racing	Chevrolet
3	Jordan Anderson	Jordan Anderson Racing	Chevrolet
4	Todd Gilliland	Kyle Busch Motorsports	Toyota
5	Dylan Lupton	DGR-Crosley	Toyota
6	Norm Benning	Norm Benning Racing	Chevrolet
8	Camden Murphy	NEMCO Motorsports	Chevrolet
10	Jennifer Jo Cobb	Jennifer Jo Cobb Racing	Chevrolet
12	Gus Dean (R)	Young's Motorsports	Chevrolet
13	Johnny Sauter	ThorSport Racing	Ford
15	Anthony Alfredo (R)	DGR-Crosley	Toyota
16	Austin Hill	Hattori Racing Enterprises	Toyota
17	Tyler Ankrum (R)	DGR-Crosley	Toyota
18	Harrison Burton (R)	Kyle Busch Motorsports	Toyota
20	Spencer Boyd (R)	Young's Motorsports	Chevrolet
22	Austin Wayne Self	AM Racing	Chevrolet
24	Brett Moffitt	GMS Racing	Chevrolet
32	Mason Massey	Reaume Brothers Racing	Toyota
33	Josh Bilicki (i)	Reaume Brothers Racing	Chevrolet
34	Jesse Iwuji	Reaume Brothers Racing	Chevrolet
44	Spencer Davis	Niece Motorsports	Chevrolet
45	Ross Chastain	Niece Motorsports	Chevrolet
51	Brandon Jones (i)	Kyle Busch Motorsports	Toyota
52	Stewart Friesen	Halmar Friesen Racing	Chevrolet
54	Natalie Decker (R)	DGR-Crosley	Toyota
56	Timmy Hill (i)	Hill Motorsports	Chevrolet
87	Joe Nemechek	NEMCO Motorsports	Chevrolet
88	Matt Crafton	ThorSport Racing	Ford
98	Grant Enfinger	ThorSport Racing	Ford
99	Ben Rhodes	ThorSport Racing	Ford

== Practice ==
=== First practice ===
Brandon Jones was the fastest in the first practice session with a time of 30.738 seconds and a speed of 175.678 mph (282.726 km/h).

Pos	No.	Driver	Team	Manufacturer	Time	Speed
1	51	Brandon Jones (i)	Kyle Busch Motorsports	Toyota	30.738	175.678
2	18	Harrison Burton (R)	Kyle Busch Motorsports	Toyota	30.829	175.160
3	4	Todd Gilliland	Kyle Busch Motorsports	Toyota	30.971	174.357

=== Second practice ===
Anthony Alfredo was the fastest in the second practice session with a time of 30.635 seconds and a speed of 176.269 mph (283.677 km/h).

Pos	No.	Driver	Team	Manufacturer	Time	Speed
1	15	Anthony Alfredo (R)	DGR-Crosley	Toyota	30.635	176.269
2	24	Brett Moffitt	GMS Racing	Chevrolet	30.681	176.005
3	98	Grant Enfinger	ThorSport Racing	Ford	30.715	175.810

=== Final practice ===
Anthony Alfredo was the fastest in the final practice session with a time of 30.596 seconds and a speed of 176.494 mph (284.040 km/h).

Pos	No.	Driver	Team	Manufacturer	Time	Speed
1	15	Anthony Alfredo (R)	DGR-Crosley	Toyota	30.596	176.494
2	13	Johnny Sauter	ThorSport Racing	Ford	30.604	176.448
3	16	Austin Hill	Hattori Racing Enterprises	Toyota	30.663	176.108

== Qualifying ==
Austin Hill scored the pole for the race with a time of 30.572 seconds and a speed of 176.632 mph (284.262 km/h).

=== Qualifying results ===
Pos	No	Driver	Team	Manufacturer	Time
1	16	Austin Hill	Hattori Racing Enterprises	Toyota	30.572
2	13	Johnny Sauter	ThorSport Racing	Ford	30.596
3	24	Brett Moffitt	GMS Racing	Chevrolet	30.624
4	17	Tyler Ankrum (R)	DGR-Crosley	Toyota	30.663
5	98	Grant Enfinger	ThorSport Racing	Ford	30.681
6	15	Anthony Alfredo (R)	DGR-Crosley	Toyota	30.685
7	2	Sheldon Creed (R)	GMS Racing	Chevrolet	30.713
8	18	Harrison Burton (R)	Kyle Busch Motorsports	Toyota	30.720
9	5	Dylan Lupton	DGR-Crosley	Toyota	30.727
10	52	Stewart Friesen	Halmar Friesen Racing	Chevrolet	30.738
11	88	Matt Crafton	ThorSport Racing	Ford	30.744
12	12	Gus Dean (R)	Young's Motorsports	Chevrolet	30.756
13	4	Todd Gilliland	Kyle Busch Motorsports	Toyota	30.777
14	02	Tyler Dippel (R)	Young's Motorsports	Chevrolet	30.781
15	54	Natalie Decker (R)	DGR-Crosley	Toyota	30.843
16	45	Ross Chastain	Niece Motorsports	Chevrolet	30.872
17	99	Ben Rhodes	ThorSport Racing	Ford	30.882
18	22	Austin Wayne Self	AM Racing	Chevrolet	30.906
19	51	Brandon Jones (i)	Kyle Busch Motorsports	Toyota	30.914
20	20	Spencer Boyd (R)	Young's Motorsports	Chevrolet	31.126
21	3	Jordan Anderson	Jordan Anderson Racing	Chevrolet	31.282
22	44	Spencer Davis	Niece Motorsports	Chevrolet	31.283
23	8	Camden Murphy	NEMCO Motorsports	Chevrolet	31.300
24	56	Timmy Hill (i)	Hill Motorsports	Chevrolet	31.537
25	87	Joe Nemechek	NEMCO Motorsports	Chevrolet	32.100
26	32	Mason Massey	Reaume Brothers Racing	Toyota	32.158
27	33	Josh Bilicki (i)	Reaume Brothers Racing	Chevrolet	32.297
28	34	Jesse Iwuji	Reaume Brothers Racing	Chevrolet	32.735
29	1	B. J. McLeod (i)	Vizion Motorsports	Toyota	33.676
30	10	Jennifer Jo Cobb	Jennifer Jo Cobb Racing	Chevrolet	34.315
31	6	Norm Benning	Norm Benning Racing	Chevrolet	34.564
32	0	Joey Gase (i)	Jennifer Jo Cobb Racing	Chevrolet	35.670

== Race ==
=== Summary ===
Austin Hill started on pole. Grant Enfinger took the lead from him on lap 13, holding it for the majority of the stage. On the final lap of Stage 1, Brandon Jones inched past Enfinger and took the stage win.

Enfinger retook the lead afterwards, but managed to win Stage 2 himself after holding off a charging Jones. As the final stage began, Enfinger's run worsened as he got caught in a four-wide pack and fell to the back of the top 10. He was then pushed into the wall when Spencer Davis got loose underneath him, triggering a wreck that also collected Austin Wayne Self. Issues on pit road caused Enfinger to confront Hill after the race.

Brett Moffitt took the lead with 75 laps to go, and remained the fastest driver of the night. He briefly lost the lead during a series of green-flag pit stops. Moffitt's lead over runner-up Jones grew to around two seconds, with Moffitt eventually earning his second win of the season.

=== Stage Results ===
Stage One Laps: 35

Pos	No	Driver	Team	Manufacturer	Points
1	51	Brandon Jones (i)	Kyle Busch Motorsports	Toyota	0
2	98	Grant Enfinger	ThorSport Racing	Ford	9
3	24	Brett Moffitt	GMS Racing	Chevrolet	8
4	16	Austin Hill	Hattori Racing Enterprises	Toyota	7
5	17	Tyler Ankrum (R)	DGR-Crosley	Toyota	6
6	18	Harrison Burton (R)	Kyle Busch Motorsports	Toyota	5
7	88	Matt Crafton	ThorSport Racing	Ford	4
8	52	Stewart Friesen	Halmar Friesen Racing	Chevrolet	3
9	22	Austin Wayne Self	AM Racing	Chevrolet	2
10	5	Dylan Lupton	DGR-Crosley	Toyota	1

Stage Two Laps: 35

Pos	No	Driver	Team	Manufacturer	Points
1	98	Grant Enfinger	ThorSport Racing	Ford	10
2	51	Brandon Jones (i)	Kyle Busch Motorsports	Toyota	0
3	24	Brett Moffitt	GMS Racing	Chevrolet	8
4	18	Harrison Burton (R)	Kyle Busch Motorsports	Toyota	7
5	16	Austin Hill	Hattori Racing Enterprises	Toyota	6
6	52	Stewart Friesen	Halmar Friesen Racing	Chevrolet	5
7	88	Matt Crafton	ThorSport Racing	Ford	4
8	45	Ross Chastain	Niece Motorsports	Chevrolet	3
9	17	Tyler Ankrum (R)	DGR-Crosley	Toyota	2
10	5	Dylan Lupton	DGR-Crosley	Toyota	1

=== Final Stage Results ===
Stage Three Laps: 80

Pos	Grid	No	Driver	Team	Manufacturer	Laps	Points
1	3	24	Brett Moffitt	GMS Racing	Chevrolet	150	56
2	19	51	Brandon Jones (i)	Kyle Busch Motorsports	Toyota	150	0
3	10	52	Stewart Friesen	Halmar Friesen Racing	Chevrolet	150	42
4	8	18	Harrison Burton (R)	Kyle Busch Motorsports	Toyota	150	45
5	1	16	Austin Hill	Hattori Racing Enterprises	Toyota	150	45
6	13	4	Todd Gilliland	Kyle Busch Motorsports	Toyota	150	31
7	16	45	Ross Chastain	Niece Motorsports	Chevrolet	150	32
8	11	88	Matt Crafton	ThorSport Racing	Ford	150	37
9	6	15	Anthony Alfredo (R)	DGR-Crosley	Toyota	150	28
10	9	5	Dylan Lupton	DGR-Crosley	Toyota	150	29
11	7	2	Sheldon Creed (R)	GMS Racing	Chevrolet	149	26
12	14	02	Tyler Dippel (R)	Young's Motorsports	Chevrolet	149	25
13	4	17	Tyler Ankrum (R)	DGR-Crosley	Toyota	149	33
14	15	54	Natalie Decker (R)	DGR-Crosley	Toyota	149	23
15	12	12	Gus Dean (R)	Young's Motorsports	Chevrolet	149	22
16	5	98	Grant Enfinger	ThorSport Racing	Ford	148	40
17	20	20	Spencer Boyd (R)	Young's Motorsports	Chevrolet	148	20
18	2	13	Johnny Sauter	ThorSport Racing	Ford	147	19
19	27	33	Josh Reaume (i)	Reaume Brothers Racing	Chevrolet	147	0
20	21	3	Jordan Anderson	Jordan Anderson Racing	Chevrolet	146	17
21	30	10	Jennifer Jo Cobb	Jennifer Jo Cobb Racing	Chevrolet	141	16
22	28	34	Jesse Iwuji	Reaume Brothers Racing	Chevrolet	138	15
23	23	8	Camden Murphy	NEMCO Motorsports	Chevrolet	93	14
24	24	56	Timmy Hill (i)	Hill Motorsports	Chevrolet	89	0
25	18	22	Austin Wayne Self	AM Racing	Chevrolet	88	14
26	26	32	Mason Massey	Reaume Brothers Racing	Toyota	82	11
27	22	44	Spencer Davis	Niece Motorsports	Chevrolet	78	10
28	25	87	Joe Nemechek	NEMCO Motorsports	Chevrolet	45	9
29	31	6	Norm Benning	Norm Benning Racing	Chevrolet	35	8
30	29	1	B. J. McLeod (i)	Vizion Motorsports	Toyota	17	0
31	32	0	Joey Gase (i)	Jennifer Jo Cobb Racing	Chevrolet	15	0
32	17	99	Ben Rhodes	ThorSport Racing	Ford	1	5

Previous race: 2019 CarShield 200	NASCAR Gander Outdoors Truck Series; 2019 season	Next race: 2019 Buckle Up in Your Truck 225
