= 2019 Ford EcoBoost 200 =

Race details
- Race 23 of 23 in the 2019 NASCAR Gander Outdoors Truck Series season
- Date: November 15, 2019
- Location: Homestead-Miami Speedway in Homestead, Florida
- Course: Permanent racing facility
- Course length: 1.5 miles (2.414 km)
- Distance: 134 laps, 201 mi (323.478 km)

Pole position
Driver	Stewart Friesen	Halmar Friesen Racing
- Time: N/A

Most laps led
Driver	Austin Hill	Hattori Racing Enterprises
- Laps: 56

Winner
No. 16	Austin Hill	Hattori Racing Enterprises

Television in the United States
- Network: FS1

Radio in the United States
- Radio: MRN

The 2019 Ford EcoBoost 200 is a NASCAR Gander Outdoors Truck Series race held on November 15, 2019, at Homestead-Miami Speedway in Homestead, Florida. Contested over 134 laps on the 1.5 mile (2.4 km) oval, it was the 23rd and final race of the 2019 NASCAR Gander Outdoors Truck Series season.

== Background ==
=== Track ===
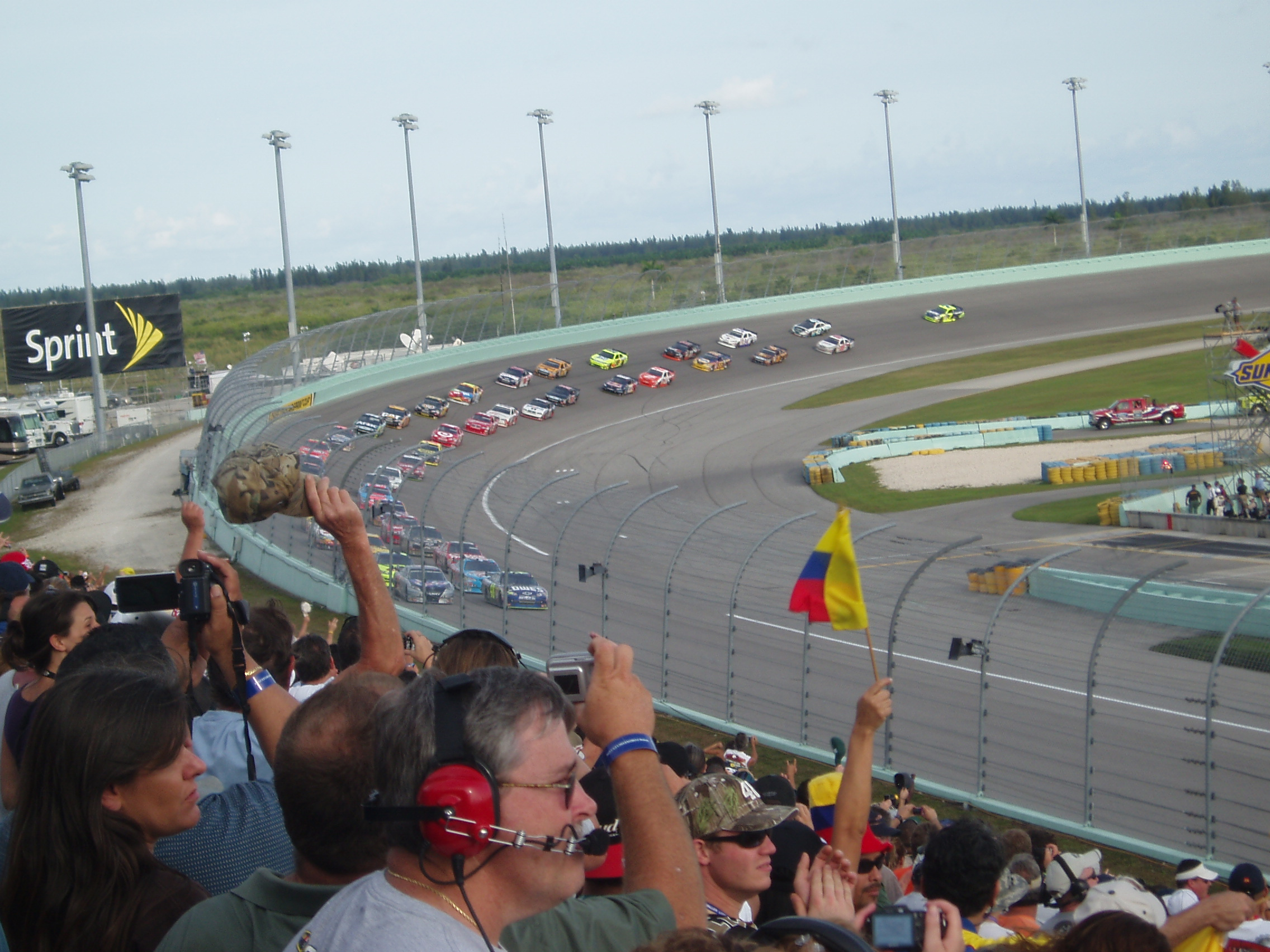
Homestead-Miami Speedway, the track where the race was held.

Homestead-Miami Speedway is a motor racing track located in Homestead, Florida. The track, which has several configurations, has promoted several series of racing, including NASCAR, the Verizon IndyCar Series, the Grand-Am Rolex Sports Car Series and the Championship Cup Series.

From 2002 to 2019, Homestead–Miami Speedway hosted the final race of the season in all three of NASCAR's series: the Cup Series, the Xfinity Series, and the Gander Outdoors Truck Series. Ford Motor Company sponsored all three of the season-ending races, under the names Ford EcoBoost 400, Ford EcoBoost 300, and Ford EcoBoost 200, respectively. The weekend itself was marketed as Ford Championship Weekend. The Xfinity Series held its season-ending races at Homestead from 1995 until 2020, when it was moved to Phoenix Raceway, along with NASCAR's other two series.

== Entry list ==
No.	Driver	Team	Manufacturer
02	Tyler Dippel (R)	Young's Motorsports	Chevrolet
2	Sheldon Creed (R)	GMS Racing	Chevrolet
3	Jordan Anderson	Jordan Anderson Racing	Chevrolet
04	Cory Roper	Roper Racing	Ford
4	Todd Gilliland	Kyle Busch Motorsports	Toyota
5	Dylan Lupton	DGR-Crosley	Toyota
7	Tanner Gray	DGR-Crosley	Toyota
8	Joe Nemechek	NEMCO Motorsports	Chevrolet
9	Codie Rohrbaugh	CR7 Motorsports	Chevrolet
10	Jennifer Jo Cobb	Jennifer Jo Cobb Racing	Chevrolet
11	Spencer Davis	Rette Jones Racing	Toyota
12	Gus Dean (R)	Young's Motorsports	Chevrolet
13	Johnny Sauter	ThorSport Racing	Ford
15	Anthony Alfredo (R)	DGR-Crosley	Toyota
16	Austin Hill	Hattori Racing Enterprises	Toyota
17	Tyler Ankrum (R)	DGR-Crosley	Toyota
18	Harrison Burton (R)	Kyle Busch Motorsports	Toyota
19	Derek Kraus	Bill McAnally Racing	Toyota
20	Colby Howard	Young's Motorsports	Chevrolet
22	Austin Wayne Self	AM Racing	Chevrolet
24	Brett Moffitt (CC)	GMS Racing	Chevrolet
30	Danny Bohn	On Point Motorsports	Toyota
33	Josh Bilicki	Reaume Brothers Racing	Chevrolet
34	Josh Reaume	Reaume Brothers Racing	Toyota
44	Angela Ruch	Niece Motorsports	Chevrolet
45	Ross Chastain (CC)	Niece Motorsports	Chevrolet
49	Ray Ciccarelli	CMI Motorsports	Chevrolet
51	Christian Eckes	Kyle Busch Motorsports	Toyota
52	Stewart Friesen (CC)	Halmar Friesen Racing	Chevrolet
54	Natalie Decker (R)	DGR-Crosley	Toyota
56	Tyler Hill	Hill Motorsports	Chevrolet
75	Parker Kligerman	Henderson Motorsports	Chevrolet
87	Camden Murphy (i)	NEMCO Motorsports	Chevrolet
88	Matt Crafton (CC)	ThorSport Racing	Ford
97	Jesse Little	JJL Motorsports	Ford
98	Grant Enfinger	ThorSport Racing	Ford
99	Ben Rhodes	ThorSport Racing	Ford

== Practice ==
=== First practice ===
Grant Enfinger was the fastest in the first practice session with a time of 32.141 seconds and a speed of 168.010 mph (270.386 km/h).

Pos	No.	Driver	Team	Manufacturer	Time	Speed
1	98	Grant Enfinger	ThorSport Racing	Ford	32.141	168.010
2	24	Brett Moffitt	GMS Racing	Chevrolet	32.212	167.639
3	16	Austin Hill	Hattori Racing Enterprises	Toyota	32.304	167.162

=== Final practice ===
Stewart Friesen was the fastest in the final practice session with a time of 32.664 seconds and a speed of 165.320 mph (266.057 km/h).

Pos	No.	Driver	Team	Manufacturer	Time	Speed
1	52	Stewart Friesen	Halmar Friesen Racing	Chevrolet	32.664	165.320
2	97	Jesse Little	JJL Motorsports	Ford	32.680	165.239
3	51	Christian Eckes	Kyle Busch Motorsports	Toyota	32.902	164.124

== Qualifying ==
Qualifying was cancelled due to rain. Stewart Friesen was awarded the pole for the race due to his win in the previous week's race.

=== Qualifying results ===
Pos	No	Driver	Team	Manufacturer	Time
1	52	Stewart Friesen	Halmar Friesen Racing	Chevrolet	0.000
2	51	Christian Eckes	Kyle Busch Motorsports	Toyota	0.000
3	45	Ross Chastain	Niece Motorsports	Chevrolet	0.000
4	24	Brett Moffitt	GMS Racing	Chevrolet	0.000
5	16	Austin Hill	Hattori Racing Enterprises	Toyota	0.000
6	13	Johnny Sauter	ThorSport Racing	Ford	0.000
7	98	Grant Enfinger	ThorSport Racing	Ford	0.000
8	17	Tyler Ankrum (R)	DGR-Crosley	Toyota	0.000
9	88	Matt Crafton	ThorSport Racing	Ford	0.000
10	99	Ben Rhodes	ThorSport Racing	Ford	0.000
11	4	Todd Gilliland	Kyle Busch Motorsports	Toyota	0.000
12	2	Sheldon Creed (R)	GMS Racing	Chevrolet	0.000
13	18	Harrison Burton (R)	Kyle Busch Motorsports	Toyota	0.000
14	22	Austin Wayne Self	AM Racing	Chevrolet	0.000
15	02	Tyler Dippel (R)	Young's Motorsports	Chevrolet	0.000
16	20	Colby Howard	Young's Motorsports	Chevrolet	0.000
17	44	Angela Ruch	Niece Motorsports	Chevrolet	0.000
18	3	Jordan Anderson	Jordan Anderson Racing	Chevrolet	0.000
19	12	Gus Dean (R)	Young's Motorsports	Chevrolet	0.000
20	54	Natalie Decker (R)	DGR-Crosley	Toyota	0.000
21	33	Josh Bilicki	Reaume Brothers Racing	Chevrolet	0.000
22	30	Danny Bohn	On Point Motorsports	Toyota	0.000
23	8	Joe Nemechek	NEMCO Motorsports	Chevrolet	0.000
24	15	Anthony Alfredo (R)	DGR-Crosley	Toyota	0.000
25	10	Jennifer Jo Cobb	Jennifer Jo Cobb Racing	Chevrolet	0.000
26	7	Tanner Gray	DGR-Crosley	Toyota	0.000
27	75	Parker Kligerman	Henderson Motorsports	Chevrolet	0.000
28	56	Tyler Hill	Hill Motorsports	Chevrolet	0.000
29	04	Cory Roper	Roper Racing	Ford	0.000
30	9	Codie Rohrbaugh	CR7 Motorsports	Chevrolet	0.000
31	49	Ray Ciccarelli	CMI Motorsports	Chevrolet	0.000
32	97	Jesse Little	JJL Motorsports	Ford	0.000
Did not qualify
33	87	Camden Murphy (i)	NEMCO Motorsports	Chevrolet	0.000
34	5	Dylan Lupton	DGR-Crosley	Toyota	0.000
35	11	Spencer Davis	Rette Jones Racing	Toyota	0.000
36	19	Derek Kraus	Bill McAnally Racing	Toyota	0.000
Withdrew
37	34	Josh Reaume	Reaume Brothers Racing	Toyota	0.000

. – Championship 4 driver

== Race ==
- Note: Stewart Friesen, Ross Chastain, Brett Moffitt, and Matt Crafton were not eligible for stage points as they were competing for the championship.

=== Summary ===
Stewart Friesen started on pole, but Ross Chastain quickly pressured him and overtook him by the first lap. However, he was unable to pull away from Friesen and the two built up a large lead over the remainder of the field. Austin Hill caught up to them and overtook Chastain to take the stage win.

Brett Moffitt won the race off pit road after Hill was blocked. Chastain caught up to Moffitt in a similar manner he did to Friesen at the beginning of the race. Hill again caught up to the leaders and passed them, remaining in the lead to take the second stage win.

On lap 51, a caution was thrown for Ray Ciccarelli leaking fluid onto the track. Christian Eckes moved to the front on slightly worn tires. In the final round of green flag pit stops, Eckes pitted 10 laps before the others, while Hill stayed out for an extra 9 laps before pitting. Friesen was hit by Angela Ruch while entering his pit stall, costing him significant time. He later lacked long run speed, eliminating his chances of winning.

Hill won the race by around 1.5 seconds over Matt Crafton, who became the 2019 champion despite not winning a single race during the season. Eckes finished third, giving Kyle Busch Motorsports the owner's championship. Chastain finished fourth and Moffitt finished fifth.

Joe Nemechek, who started 23rd and finished 14th, broke Richard Petty's all-time start record across NASCAR's top 3 series, starting his 1,186th NASCAR race.

=== Stage Results ===
Stage One Laps: 40

Pos	No	Driver	Team	Manufacturer	Points
1	16	Austin Hill	Hattori Racing Enterprises	Toyota	10
2	45	Ross Chastain	Niece Motorsports	Chevrolet	0
3	52	Stewart Friesen	Halmar Friesen Racing	Chevrolet	0
4	24	Brett Moffitt	GMS Racing	Chevrolet	0
5	51	Christian Eckes	Kyle Busch Motorsports	Toyota	6
6	88	Matt Crafton	ThorSport Racing	Ford	0
7	2	Sheldon Creed (R)	GMS Racing	Chevrolet	4
8	17	Tyler Ankrum (R)	DGR-Crosley	Toyota	3
9	98	Grant Enfinger	ThorSport Racing	Ford	2
10	13	Johnny Sauter	ThorSport Racing	Ford	1

Stage Two Laps: 40

Pos	No	Driver	Team	Manufacturer	Points
1	16	Austin Hill	Hattori Racing Enterprises	Toyota	10
2	88	Matt Crafton	ThorSport Racing	Ford	0
3	45	Ross Chastain	Niece Motorsports	Chevrolet	0
4	24	Brett Moffitt	GMS Racing	Chevrolet	0
5	52	Stewart Friesen	Halmar Friesen Racing	Chevrolet	0
6	98	Grant Enfinger	ThorSport Racing	Ford	5
7	75	Parker Kligerman	Henderson Motorsports	Chevrolet	4
8	13	Johnny Sauter	ThorSport Racing	Ford	3
9	2	Sheldon Creed (R)	GMS Racing	Chevrolet	2
10	7	Tanner Gray	DGR-Crosley	Toyota	1

=== Final Stage Results ===
Stage Three Laps: 54

Pos	Grid	No	Driver	Team	Manufacturer	Laps	Points
1	5	16	Austin Hill	Hattori Racing Enterprises	Toyota	134	60
2	9	88	Matt Crafton	ThorSport Racing	Ford	134	35
3	2	51	Christian Eckes	Kyle Busch Motorsports	Toyota	134	40
4	3	45	Ross Chastain	Niece Motorsports	Chevrolet	134	33
5	4	24	Brett Moffitt	GMS Racing	Chevrolet	134	32
6	6	13	Johnny Sauter	ThorSport Racing	Ford	134	35
7	7	98	Grant Enfinger	ThorSport Racing	Ford	134	37
8	11	4	Todd Gilliland	Kyle Busch Motorsports	Toyota	134	29
9	12	2	Sheldon Creed (R)	GMS Racing	Chevrolet	134	34
10	27	75	Parker Kligerman	Henderson Motorsports	Chevrolet	134	31
11	1	52	Stewart Friesen	Halmar Friesen Racing	Chevrolet	134	26
12	10	99	Ben Rhodes	ThorSport Racing	Ford	134	25
13	13	18	Harrison Burton (R)	Kyle Busch Motorsports	Toyota	134	24
14	23	8	Joe Nemechek	NEMCO Motorsports	Chevrolet	133	23
15	19	12	Gus Dean (R)	Young's Motorsports	Chevrolet	133	22
16	26	7	Tanner Gray	DGR-Crosley	Toyota	133	22
17	32	97	Jesse Little	JJL Motorsports	Ford	133	20
18	15	02	Tyler Dippel (R)	Young's Motorsports	Chevrolet	133	19
19	14	22	Austin Wayne Self	AM Racing	Chevrolet	133	18
20	20	54	Natalie Decker (R)	DGR-Crosley	Toyota	133	17
21	18	3	Jordan Anderson	Jordan Anderson Racing	Chevrolet	132	16
22	8	17	Tyler Ankrum (R)	DGR-Crosley	Toyota	132	18
23	28	56	Tyler Hill	Hill Motorsports	Chevrolet	132	14
24	16	20	Colby Howard	Young's Motorsports	Chevrolet	132	13
25	22	30	Danny Bohn	On Point Motorsports	Toyota	132	12
26	30	9	Codie Rohrbaugh	CR7 Motorsports	Chevrolet	130	11
27	29	04	Cory Roper	Roper Racing	Ford	129	10
28	25	10	Jennifer Jo Cobb	Jennifer Jo Cobb Racing	Chevrolet	128	9
29	17	44	Angela Ruch	Niece Motorsports	Chevrolet	127	8
30	21	33	Josh Bilicki	Reaume Brothers Racing	Chevrolet	113	7
31	31	49	Ray Ciccarelli	CMI Motorsports	Chevrolet	48	6
32	24	15	Anthony Alfredo (R)	DGR-Crosley	Toyota	0	5

. – Driver won the championship

. – Playoffs driver

Previous race: 2019 Lucas Oil 150	NASCAR Gander Outdoors Truck Series; 2019 season	Next race: 2020 NextEra Energy 250
