= Mobile International Speedway =

NASCAR race track

MIS
- Location: 7800 Park Blvd Irvington, Alabama 36544
- Coordinates: 30°30′49″N 88°13′11″W
- Capacity: 9,000
- Owner: Eddie Shoemaker (2025–present); Ida Fields (2024)
- Operator: Jason Smith
- Broke ground: 1964
- Opened: 1965
- Architect: Walter "Skip" Wetjen
- Major events: Former: NASCAR K&N Pro Series East; Mobile 150 (2016); ARCA Racing Series; ARCA Mobile 200 (2012–2015); NASCAR Southeast Series (1991–1996, 2001); CARS Tour (1998–1999)

Oval (1965–present)
- Surface: Asphalt
- Length: 0.500 mi (0.805 km)

Mobile International Speedway is a 0.500 mi (0.805 km) paved oval track along U.S. Highway 90 in Irvington, Mobile County, Alabama, United States. It was built by Walter "Skip" Wetjen, and opened in 1965.

== History ==
During the golden age of stock car racing, the track held races with the likes of Gene Tapia, Wayne Niedecken Sr., Phil Wendt, and other NASCAR drivers. Longtime stock car driver Red Farmer won his 500th feature race at the track.

From 1966 to 1968 the track hosted open-wheel racing and held the annual World 300 race for Supermodified racing, which attracted competitors that included notable drivers such as Bobby Allison, Dale Hammac and Armond Holley.

In the 1980s, the track hosted races sanctioned by All Pro Stock, ASA, NASCAR Grand American, NASCAR All-American Challenge Series, and NASCAR All Pro Stock Car. They included drivers Donnie Allison, Rusty Wallace, Dave Mader III, Ronnie Sanders, Mike Cope, Freddy Fryar, Junior Niedecken, Jody Ridley and others.

More recently, the track has been home to a number of rising NASCAR and ARCA drivers including Rick Crawford, Kevin Swindell (a development driver for Ray Evernham), Bubba Pollard (of Roush Racing: Driver X), Cale Gale and Grant Enfinger. Kevin Swindell holds the all-time track record.

The ARCA Racing Series held the ARCA Mobile 200 at the track from 2012 to 2015, all of them won by local drivers: 1 win for Cale Gale and 3 for Enfinger. The NASCAR K&N Pro Series East held the Mobile 150 there in 2016. Also, the NASCAR Southeast Series hosted 9 races at Mobile International Speedway, between 1991 and 2001.

The CARS Hooters Pro Cup Series also had run three races at the facility, between 1998 and 1999.

== Film and television ==
Opening scenes from the 2009 film The Final Destination were shot at the track.
