= 2016 Lucas Oil 150 =

21st race of the 2016 NASCAR Camping World Truck Series

Race details
- Race 22 of 23 of the 2016 NASCAR Camping World Truck Series
- Date: November 11, 2016
- Official name: 22nd Annual Lucas Oil 150
- Location: Phoenix International Raceway, Avondale, Arizona
- Course: Permanent racing facility
- Course length: 1 miles (1.6 km)
- Distance: 150 laps, 150 mi (241 km)
- Scheduled distance: 150 laps, 150 mi (241 km)
- Average speed: 84.441 mph (135.895 km/h)

Pole position
Driver	William Byron	Kyle Busch Motorsports
- Time: 26.039

Most laps led
Driver	William Byron	Kyle Busch Motorsports
- Laps: 112

Winner
No. 51	Daniel Suárez	Kyle Busch Motorsports

Television in the United States
- Network: FS1
- Announcers: Vince Welch, Phil Parsons, and Michael Waltrip

Radio in the United States
- Radio: MRN

The 2016 Lucas Oil 150 was the 22nd stock car race of the 2016 NASCAR Camping World Truck Series, the final race of the Round of 6, and the 22nd iteration of the event. The race was held on Friday, November 11, 2016, in Avondale, Arizona, at Phoenix International Raceway, a 1-mile (1.6 km) permanent tri-oval shaped racetrack. The race took the scheduled 150 laps to complete. Daniel Suárez, driving for Kyle Busch Motorsports, held off Johnny Sauter on the final restart with 4 laps to go, and earned his 1st career NASCAR Camping World Truck Series win. William Byron dominated the majority of the race, leading 112 laps before blowing an engine on lap 141. To fill out the podium, Matt Crafton, driving for ThorSport Racing, would finish in 3rd, respectively.

The four drivers that advanced into the championship 4 are Johnny Sauter, Matt Crafton, Christopher Bell, and Timothy Peters. William Byron and Ben Kennedy would be eliminated from championship contention.

== Background ==
The layout of Phoenix International Raceway, the venue where the race was held.

Phoenix International Raceway is a 1-mile, low-banked tri-oval race track located in Avondale, Arizona, near Phoenix. The motorsport track opened in 1964 and currently hosts two NASCAR race weekends annually including the final championship race since 2020. Phoenix Raceway has also hosted the CART, IndyCar Series, USAC and the WeatherTech SportsCar Championship. The raceway is currently owned and operated by NASCAR.

Phoenix Raceway is home to two annual NASCAR race weekends, one of 13 facilities on the NASCAR schedule to host more than one race weekend a year. It first joined the NASCAR Cup Series schedule in 1988 as a late season event, and in 2005 the track was given a spring date. The now-NASCAR Camping World Truck Series was added in 1995 and the now-NASCAR Xfinity Series began running there in 1999.

=== Entry list ===
- (R) denotes rookie driver.
- (i) denotes driver who is ineligible for series driver points.

#	Driver	Team	Make	Sponsor
00	Cole Custer (R)	JR Motorsports	Chevrolet	Haas Automation
1	Jennifer Jo Cobb	Jennifer Jo Cobb Racing	Chevrolet	Grimes Irrigation & Construction
02	Dominique Van Wieringen	Rette Jones Racing	Ford	Durobyte
2	Austin Cindric	Brad Keselowski Racing	Ford	Pirtek
4	Christopher Bell (R)	Kyle Busch Motorsports	Toyota	Toyota
05	Dylan Lupton (i)	Athenian Motorsports	Chevrolet	Lupton Excavation, Zaxby's
07	Matt Mills	SS-Green Light Racing	Chevrolet	Thompson Electric
8	John Hunter Nemechek	NEMCO Motorsports	Chevrolet	Fire Alarm Services
9	William Byron (R)	Kyle Busch Motorsports	Toyota	Liberty University
10	Tommy Regan	Jennifer Jo Cobb Racing	Chevrolet	Gaems, Unique AR's
11	Matt Tifft (R)	Red Horse Racing	Toyota	Brain Gear, Surface Sunscreen
13	Cameron Hayley	ThorSport Racing	Toyota	Ride TV, Cabinets by Hayley
16	Stewart Friesen	Halmar Racing	Chevrolet	Halmar International
17	Timothy Peters	Red Horse Racing	Toyota	Red Horse Racing
18	Noah Gragson	Wauters Motorsports	Toyota	SpeedVegas, Alert ID
19	Daniel Hemric	Brad Keselowski Racing	Ford	Blue Gate Bank
21	Johnny Sauter	GMS Racing	Chevrolet	Allegiant Travel Company
22	Myatt Snider	AM Racing	Toyota	Louisiana Hot Sauce
23	Spencer Gallagher	GMS Racing	Chevrolet	Allegiant Travel Company
24	Kaz Grala	GMS Racing	Chevrolet	Black Friday
29	Tyler Reddick	Brad Keselowski Racing	Ford	Cooper-Standard Automotive
33	Ben Kennedy	GMS Racing	Chevrolet	Jacob Companies
41	Ben Rhodes (R)	ThorSport Racing	Toyota	Carolina Nut Co., Albertsons
44	Tommy Joe Martins	Martins Motorsports	Chevrolet	Diamond Gusset Jeans
49	Bryce Napier	Premium Motorsports	Chevrolet	Central Valley HHO, SupportMilitary.org
50	Travis Kvapil	MAKE Motorsports	Chevrolet	MAKE Motorsports
51	Daniel Suárez (i)	Kyle Busch Motorsports	Toyota	Arris
63	Norm Benning	Norm Benning Racing	Chevrolet	Strategic Public Affairs
66	Austin Wayne Self (R)	AM Racing	Toyota	AM Technical Solutions
71	Kevin Donahue	Contreras Motorsports	Chevrolet	Agile Networks
74	Jordan Anderson	Mike Harmon Racing	Chevrolet	Mike Harmon Racing
88	Matt Crafton	ThorSport Racing	Toyota	Slim Jim, Menards
98	Rico Abreu (R)	ThorSport Racing	Toyota	Safelite, Curb Records
Official entry list

== Practice ==
=== First practice ===
The first practice session was held on Friday, November 11, at 9:30 am MST, and would last for 55 minutes. William Byron, driving for Kyle Busch Motorsports, would set the fastest time in the session, with a lap of 26.479, and an average speed of 135.957 mph (218.802 km/h).

Pos.	#	Driver	Team	Make	Time	Speed
1	9	William Byron (R)	Kyle Busch Motorsports	Toyota	26.479	135.957
2	41	Ben Rhodes (R)	ThorSport Racing	Toyota	26.511	135.793
3	18	Noah Gragson	Wauters Motorsports	Toyota	26.528	135.706
Full first practice results

=== Final practice ===
The final practice session was held on Friday, November 11, at 1:00 pm MST, and would last for 50 minutes. Spencer Gallagher, driving for GMS Racing, would set the fastest time in the session, with a lap of 26.637, and an average speed of 135.150 mph (217.503 km/h).

Pos.	#	Driver	Team	Make	Time	Speed
1	23	Spencer Gallagher	GMS Racing	Chevrolet	26.637	135.150
2	13	Cameron Hayley	ThorSport Racing	Toyota	26.672	134.973
3	21	Johnny Sauter	GMS Racing	Chevrolet	26.712	134.771
Full final practice results

== Qualifying ==
Qualifying was held on Friday, November 11, at 6:30 pm MST. Since Phoenix International Raceway is under 1.5 miles (2.4 km) in length, the qualifying system is a multi-car system that included three rounds. The first round was 15 minutes, where every driver would be able to set a lap within the 15 minutes. Then, the second round would consist of the fastest 24 cars in Round 1, and drivers would have 10 minutes to set a lap. Round 3 consisted of the fastest 12 drivers from Round 2, and the drivers would have 5 minutes to set a time. Whoever was fastest in Round 3 would win the pole.

William Byron, driving for Kyle Busch Motorsports, would score the pole for the race, with a lap of 26.039, and an average speed of 138.254 mph (222.498 km/h) in the third round.

Tommy Regan would fail to qualify.

=== Full qualifying results ===
Pos.	#	Driver	Team	Make	Time (R1)	Speed (R1)	Time (R2)	Speed (R2)	Time (R3)	Speed (R3)
1	9	William Byron (R)	Kyle Busch Motorsports	Toyota	26.101	137.926	26.093	137.968	26.039	138.254
2	51	Daniel Suárez (i)	Kyle Busch Motorsports	Toyota	26.733	134.665	26.289	136.939	26.133	137.757
3	98	Rico Abreu (R)	ThorSport Racing	Toyota	26.303	136.867	26.445	136.132	26.240	137.195
4	21	Johnny Sauter	GMS Racing	Chevrolet	26.663	135.019	26.331	136.721	26.245	137.169
5	4	Christopher Bell (R)	Kyle Busch Motorsports	Toyota	26.403	136.348	26.414	136.291	26.310	136.830
6	8	John Hunter Nemechek	NEMCO Motorsports	Chevrolet	26.383	136.452	26.352	136.612	26.373	136.503
7	13	Cameron Hayley	ThorSport Racing	Toyota	26.580	135.440	26.389	136.420	26.401	136.358
8	17	Timothy Peters	Red Horse Racing	Toyota	26.901	133.824	26.401	136.358	26.452	136.096
9	41	Ben Rhodes (R)	ThorSport Racing	Toyota	26.565	135.517	26.491	135.895	26.486	135.921
10	88	Matt Crafton	ThorSport Racing	Toyota	26.755	134.554	26.455	136.080	26.501	135.844
11	24	Kaz Grala	GMS Racing	Chevrolet	26.725	134.705	26.469	136.008	26.523	135.731
12	00	Cole Custer (R)	JR Motorsports	Chevrolet	26.672	134.973	26.515	135.772	26.591	135.384
Eliminated in Round 2
13	29	Tyler Reddick	Brad Keselowski Racing	Ford	26.786	134.399	26.523	135.731	-	-
14	18	Noah Gragson	Wauters Motorsports	Toyota	26.755	134.554	26.533	135.680	-	-
15	19	Daniel Hemric	Brad Keselowski Racing	Ford	26.639	135.140	26.575	135.466	-	-
16	23	Spencer Gallagher	GMS Racing	Chevrolet	26.757	134.544	26.622	135.227	-	-
17	11	Matt Tifft (R)	Red Horse Racing	Toyota	26.601	135.333	26.633	135.171	-	-
18	33	Ben Kennedy	GMS Racing	Chevrolet	26.807	134.293	26.640	135.135	-	-
19	22	Myatt Snider	AM Racing	Toyota	27.001	133.328	26.674	134.963	-	-
20	16	Stewart Friesen	Halmar Racing	Chevrolet	26.909	133.784	26.748	134.590	-	-
21	2	Austin Cindric	Brad Keselowski Racing	Ford	26.791	134.373	26.981	133.427	-	-
22	44	Tommy Joe Martins	Martins Motorsports	Chevrolet	27.173	132.484	27.037	133.151	-	-
23	05	Dylan Lupton (i)	Athenian Motorsports	Chevrolet	26.922	133.720	27.239	132.163	-	-
24	02	Dominique Van Wieringen	Rette Jones Racing	Ford	27.249	132.115	27.299	131.873	-	-
Eliminated in Round 1
25	74	Jordan Anderson	Mike Harmon Racing	Chevrolet	27.310	131.820	-	-	-	-
26	71	Kevin Donahue	Contreras Motorsports	Chevrolet	27.423	131.277	-	-	-	-
27	07	Matt Mills	SS-Green Light Racing	Chevrolet	27.452	131.138	-	-	-	-
Qualified by owner's points
28	50	Travis Kvapil	MAKE Motorsports	Chevrolet	27.501	130.904	-	-	-	-
29	66	Austin Wayne Self (R)	AM Racing	Toyota	27.930	128.894	-	-	-	-
30	49	Bryce Napier	Premium Motorsports	Chevrolet	28.004	128.553	-	-	-	-
31	63	Norm Benning	Norm Benning Racing	Chevrolet	28.839	124.831	-	-	-	-
32	1	Jennifer Jo Cobb	Jennifer Jo Cobb Racing	Chevrolet	-	-	-	-	-	-
Failed to qualify
33	10	Tommy Regan	Jennifer Jo Cobb Racing	Chevrolet	28.912	124.516	-	-	-	-
Official qualifying results
Official starting lineup

== Race results ==
Fin	St	#	Driver	Team	Make	Laps	Led	Status	Pts
1	2	51	Daniel Suárez (i)	Kyle Busch Motorsports	Toyota	150	34	Running	0
2	4	21	Johnny Sauter	GMS Racing	Chevrolet	150	0	Running	31
3	10	88	Matt Crafton	ThorSport Racing	Toyota	150	0	Running	30
4	7	13	Cameron Hayley	ThorSport Racing	Toyota	150	0	Running	29
5	8	17	Timothy Peters	Red Horse Racing	Toyota	150	0	Running	28
6	6	8	John Hunter Nemechek	NEMCO Motorsports	Chevrolet	150	0	Running	27
7	5	4	Christopher Bell (R)	Kyle Busch Motorsports	Toyota	150	0	Running	26
8	17	11	Matt Tifft (R)	Red Horse Racing	Toyota	150	0	Running	25
9	18	33	Ben Kennedy	GMS Racing	Chevrolet	150	0	Running	24
10	12	00	Cole Custer (R)	JR Motorsports	Chevrolet	150	0	Running	23
11	3	98	Rico Abreu (R)	ThorSport Racing	Toyota	150	0	Running	22
12	13	29	Tyler Reddick	Brad Keselowski Racing	Ford	150	4	Running	22
13	15	19	Daniel Hemric	Brad Keselowski Racing	Ford	150	0	Running	20
14	9	41	Ben Rhodes (R)	ThorSport Racing	Toyota	150	0	Running	19
15	21	2	Austin Cindric	Brad Keselowski Racing	Ford	150	0	Running	18
16	14	18	Noah Gragson	Wauters Motorsports	Toyota	150	0	Running	17
17	19	22	Myatt Snider	AM Racing	Toyota	150	0	Running	16
18	20	16	Stewart Friesen	Halmar Racing	Chevrolet	150	0	Running	15
19	23	05	Dylan Lupton (i)	Athenian Motorsports	Chevrolet	150	0	Running	0
20	26	71	Kevin Donahue	Contreras Motorsports	Chevrolet	149	0	Running	13
21	27	07	Matt Mills	SS-Green Light Racing	Chevrolet	148	0	Running	12
22	29	66	Austin Wayne Self (R)	AM Racing	Toyota	147	0	Running	11
23	28	50	Travis Kvapil	MAKE Motorsports	Chevrolet	147	0	Running	10
24	32	1	Jennifer Jo Cobb	Jennifer Jo Cobb Racing	Chevrolet	146	0	Running	9
25	30	49	Bryce Napier	Premium Motorsports	Chevrolet	146	0	Running	8
26	31	63	Norm Benning	Norm Benning Racing	Chevrolet	145	0	Running	7
27	1	9	William Byron (R)	Kyle Busch Motorsports	Toyota	141	112	Engine	8
28	11	24	Kaz Grala	GMS Racing	Chevrolet	76	0	Accident	5
29	25	74	Jordan Anderson	Mike Harmon Racing	Chevrolet	62	0	Engine	4
30	22	44	Tommy Joe Martins	Martins Motorsports	Chevrolet	36	0	Accident	3
31	24	02	Dominique Van Wieringen	Rette Jones Racing	Ford	26	0	Accident	2
32	16	23	Spencer Gallagher	GMS Racing	Chevrolet	11	0	Accident	1
Official race results

== Standings after the race ==
Drivers' Championship standings

	Pos	Driver	Points
	1	Johnny Sauter	4,000
2	2	Matt Crafton	4,000 (−0)
	3	Christopher Bell	4,000 (−0)
1	4	Timothy Peters	4,000 (−0)
3	5	William Byron	2,163 (−1,837)
	6	Ben Kennedy	2,143 (−1,857)
	7	Daniel Hemric	2,135 (−1,865)
	8	John Hunter Nemechek	2,111 (−1,889)
Official driver's standings

- Note: Only the first 8 positions are included for the driver standings.

Previous race: 2016 Striping Technology 350	NASCAR Camping World Truck Series; 2016 season	Next race: 2016 Ford EcoBoost 200
