= Gavan Boschele =

American racing driver (born 2008)

- Born: Gavan Wade Boschele; February 12, 2008 (age 18); Mooresville, North Carolina, U.S.
- Achievements: 2025 World Series of Asphalt Super Late Model Champion; 2025 Clyde Hart Memorial 200 Winner
- Awards: 2025 ASA Southern Super Series Rookie of the Year; 2024 ASA/CRA Super Series Rookie of the Year; 2023 United Sprint Car Series Rookie of the Year

NASCAR FedEx Freight Truck Series career
- 3 races run over 1 year
- 2026 position: 48th
- Best finish: 48th (2026)
- First race: 2026 TSport 200 (IRP)
- Last race: 2026 Black's Tire 200 (Martinsville)
Wins	Top tens	Poles
0	1	0

ARCA Menards Series career
- 13 races run over 2 years
- Best finish: 12th (2026)
- First race: 2024 Berlin ARCA 200 (Berlin)
- Last race: 2026 Menards 150 (Kansas)
Wins	Top tens	Poles
0	11	0

ARCA Menards Series East career
- 4 races run over 1 year
- Best finish: 15th (2026)
- First race: 2026 Rockingham ARCA Menards Series East 125 (Rockingham)
- Last race: 2026 Bush's Best 200 (Bristol)
Wins	Top tens	Poles
0	2	0

ARCA Menards Series West career
- 1 race run over 1 year
- Best finish: 50th (2026)
- First race: 2026 Desert Diamond Casino West Valley 100 (Phoenix)
Wins	Top tens	Poles
0	1	0
- Statistics up to date as of November 6, 2026.

Gavan Wade Boschele (born February 12, 2008) is an American professional stock car racing driver. He last competed part-time in the ARCA Menards Series, driving the No. 25 Toyota Camry for Nitro Motorsports, and part-time in the NASCAR Craftsman Truck Series, driving the No. 1 Toyota Tundra TRD Pro for Tricon Garage.

== Racing career ==
Boschele first started racing at the age of four, where he competed in outlaw karts at Millbridge Speedway. He then began racing in various divisions at the track, as well as various events across the Southeast United States. This progressed into racing in various series such as the ASA Southern Super Series, the CARS Pro Late Model Tour, the Carolina Pro Late Model Series, the United Sprint Car Series, and the United Sprint Car Series. He is also a former winner in the Stock Non-Wing division during the 2023 Tulsa Shootout.

=== ARCA Menards Series ===
In 2024 it was revealed that Boschele would make his debut in the ARCA Menards Series at Berlin Raceway, driving the No. 55 Toyota for Venturini Motorsports. He started on the front row in second, and finished in eighth place.

In 2025, it was revealed that Boschele would participate in the pre-season test for the ARCA Menards Series at Daytona International Speedway, driving the No. 70 Toyota for Nitro Motorsports.

In December 2025, it was announced that Boschele will compete in fifteen races for Nitro Motorsports in the ARCA Menards Series in 2026. He would also once again participate with the team in the pre-season test at Daytona, where he set the second fastest time between the two sessions held.

=== NASCAR Craftsman Truck Series ===
On July 20, 2026, it was announced that Boschele would drive a partial schedule for Tricon Garage, beginning at IRP.

== Motorsports career results ==
=== Career summary ===
Season	Series	Team	Races	Wins	Top 5	Top 10	Points	Position
2022	CARS Pro Late Model Tour	N/A	2	0	0	2	53	20th
2023	CARS Pro Late Model Tour	N/A	5	0	2	3	120	16th
2024	CARS Late Model Stock Car Tour	Lee Pulliam Performance	2	0	0	0	0	NC
2024	ARCA Menards Series	Venturini Motorsports	1	0	0	1	36	82nd
2026	ARCA Menards Series West	Nitro Motorsports	1	0	1	1	40	50th
2026	ARCA Menards Series East	Nitro Motorsports	4	0	1	2	133	15th
2026	ARCA Menards Series	Nitro Motorsports	12	0	8	10	463	12th
2026	NASCAR Craftsman Truck Series	Tricon Garage	3	0	0	1	50	48th

=== NASCAR ===
(key) (Bold – Pole position awarded by qualifying time. Italics – Pole position earned by points standings or practice time. * – Most laps led.)

==== Craftsman Truck Series ====
NASCAR Craftsman Truck Series results
Year	Team	No.	Make	1	2	3	4	5	6	7	8	9	10	11	12	13	14	15	16	17	18	19	20	21	22	23	24	25	NCTS	Pts	Ref
2026	Tricon Garage	1	Toyota	DAY	ATL	STP	DAR	ROC	BRI	TEX	GLN	DOV	CLT	NSH	MCH	COR	LRP	NWS	IRP; 8	RCH	NHA; 33	BRI	KAN	CLT	PHO	TAL	MAR; 24	HOM	48th	50	

^{*} Season still in progress
^{1} Ineligible for series points

=== ARCA Menards Series ===
(key) (Bold – Pole position awarded by qualifying time. Italics – Pole position earned by points standings or practice time. * – Most laps led. ** – All laps led.)

ARCA Menards Series results
Year	Team	No.	Make	1	2	3	4	5	6	7	8	9	10	11	12	13	14	15	16	17	18	19	20	AMSC	Pts	Ref
2024	Venturini Motorsports	55	Toyota	DAY	PHO	TAL	DOV	KAN	CLT	IOW	MOH	BLN; 8	IRP	SLM	ELK	MCH	ISF	MLW	DSF	GLN	BRI	KAN	TOL	82nd	36	
2026	Nitro Motorsports	25	Toyota	DAY	PHO	KAN; 4	TAL	GLN; 4	TOL	MCH; 3	POC; 2	BER	ELK	CHI; 12	LRP	IRP; 4	IOW; 6	ISF; 5	MAD	DSF; 4	SLM; 8	BRI; 13	KAN; 3	12th	463	

==== ARCA Menards Series East ====
ARCA Menards Series East results
Year	Team	No.	Make	1	2	3	4	5	6	7	8	AMSEC	Pts	Ref
2026	Nitro Motorsports	25	Toyota	HCY	CAR; 20	NSV	TOL	IRP; 4	FRS	IOW; 6	BRI; 13	15th	133	

==== ARCA Menards Series West ====
ARCA Menards Series West results
Year	Team	No.	Make	1	2	3	4	5	6	7	8	9	10	11	12	13	AMSWC	Pts	Ref
2026	Nitro Motorsports	25	Toyota	KER	PHO	TUC	SHA	CNS	TRI	SON	PIR	AAS	MAD	LVS	PHO; 4	KER	50th	40	

=== CARS Late Model Stock Car Tour ===
(key) (Bold – Pole position awarded by qualifying time. Italics – Pole position earned by points standings or practice time. * – Most laps led. ** – All laps led.)

CARS Late Model Stock Car Tour results
Year	Team	No.	Make	1	2	3	4	5	6	7	8	9	10	11	12	13	14	15	16	17	CLMSCTC	Pts	Ref
2024	Lee Pulliam Performance	55	Toyota	SNM; 20	HCY	AAS	OCS	ACE	TCM	LGY; 16	DOM	CRW	HCY	NWS	ACE	WCS	FLC	SBO	TCM	NWS	N/A	0	

=== CARS Pro Late Model Tour ===
(key)

CARS Pro Late Model Tour results
Year	Team	No.	Make	1	2	3	4	5	6	7	8	9	10	11	12	13	CPLMTC	Pts	Ref
2022	N/A	5	Chevy	CRW	HCY	GPS	FCS	TCM	HCY	ACE	MMS; 6						20th	53	
2022	N/A	5B	Chevy									TCM; 7	ACE	SBO	CRW		20th	53	
2023	N/A	5B	Chevy	SNM; 16	HCY; 9	ACE	NWS										16th	120	
2023	N/A	25	Chevy					TCM; 2	DIL	CRW	WKS	HCY	TCM; 4	SBO	TCM; 13	CRW	16th	120	

=== ASA STARS National Tour ===
(key) (Bold – Pole position awarded by qualifying time. Italics – Pole position earned by points standings or practice time. * – Most laps led. ** – All laps led.)

ASA STARS National Tour results
Year	Team	No.	Make	1	2	3	4	5	6	7	8	9	10	11	12	ASNTC	Pts	Ref
2024	Rackley W.A.R.	25	Chevy	NSM	FIF	HCY; 23	MAD	MLW	AND							17th	211	
2024	Wilson Motorsports	28	Toyota							OWO; 3	TOL; 3					17th	211	
2024	Wilson Motorsports	24	Toyota									WIN; 7	NSV			17th	211	
2025	Wilson Motorsports	24	Toyota	NSM; 1	FIF; 6	DOM; 15	HCY; 3	NPS; 12	MAD; 8	SLG; 5	AND; 2	OWO; 5	TOL; 10	WIN; 15	NSV; 8	4th	658	
