= Squirrel McNutt =

American YouTube personality and racing driver (born 1992)

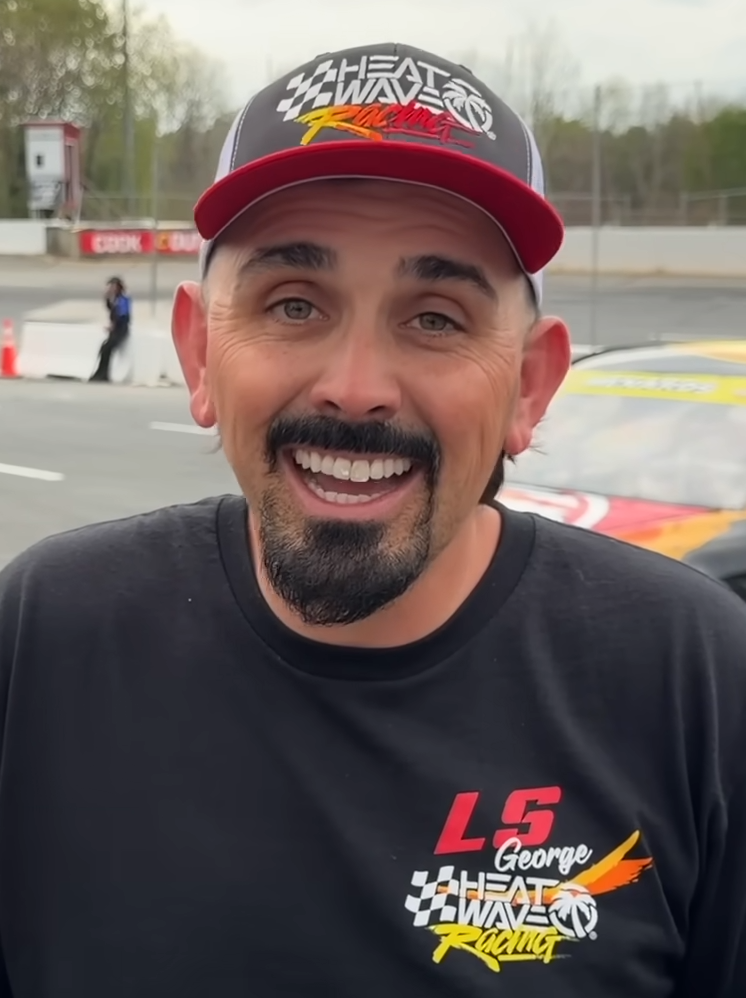
- McNutt at Hickory Motor Speedway in 2026
- Born: George Edmond Siciliano; July 7, 1992 (age 34); Springhill, Florida, U.S.

ARCA Menards Series career
- 3 races run over 1 year
- ARCA no., team: No. 0 (Rette Jones Racing)
- Best finish: 52nd (2026)
- First race: 2026 Tide 150 (Kansas)
- Last race: 2026 Henry Ford Health 200 (Michigan)
Wins	Top tens	Poles
0	1	0

ARCA Menards Series East career
- 2 races run over 1 year
- ARCA East no., team: No. 0 (Rette Jones Racing)
- Best finish: 39th (2026)
- First race: 2026 Cook Out 200 (Hickory)
- Last race: 2026 Rockingham ARCA Menards Series East 125 (Rockingham)
Wins	Top tens	Poles
0	1	0

ARCA Menards Series West career
- ARCA West no., team: No. 0 (Rette Jones Racing)
- Statistics up to date as of September 26, 2026.

George Edmond Siciliano (born July 7, 1992), known professionally as Squirrel McNutt or LS George, is an American YouTube personality and professional stock car racing driver. He currently competes full-time in the ARCA Menards Series, driving the No. 0 Chevrolet SS for Rette Jones Racing.

== YouTube career ==
McNutt made his first appearance on YouTube on the Fasterproms channel in February 2019, with the crew buying a Chevrolet S10 from him. He would later join the team as a fabricator.

In 2021, McNutt would start working for his friend Cleetus McFarland, where he has worked ever since.

== Racing career ==
=== Early career ===
McNutt would occasionally drag race side projects with/for Cleetus starting in 2020, picking up several class wins along the way.

McNutt would race Ford Crown Victoria's from 2022-Present in races hosted by Cleetus McFarland.

In July 2025, McNutt would go head to head with NASCAR drivers Ryan Preece and Greg Biffle for the win at Stafford in the New England 900, running second early in the going but a late spin relegated him to a ninth place finish.

=== Late Models ===
On March 15, 2026, Siciliano made his first laps in a Perimeter Rail Limited Late Model, driving a car owned by Landon Huffman at Hickory Motor Speedway in a full day test.

=== ARCA ===
==== 2026 ====
McNutt's No. 0 car at Hickory Motor Speedway in 2026

On March 9, 2026, it was announced McNutt would make his ARCA platform debut in the ARCA Menards Series East at Hickory in the season opener for the series. He would go onto start eighth and finish 13th.

McNutt would make his second career start a week later, at Rockingham alongside and as a teammate at Rette Jones Racing with his friend Cleetus McFarland. He would start 13th and finish ninth, earning his first career top-ten finish.

In April, McNutt would make his debut in the National Series of the ARCA platform, the ARCA Menards Series, at Kansas piloting the No. 0 for Rette Jones Racing once again.

==== 2027 ====
In October in 2026, it was revealed that McNutt will run full-time in the main ARCA series, driving for RJR.

== Personal life ==
Siciliano was married to his wife, Boguslava Siciliano, on April 26, 2021.

== Motorsports career results ==
=== Stock car career summary ===
Season	Series	Team	Races	Wins	Top 5	Top 10	Points	Position
2026	ARCA Menards Series East	Rette Jones Racing	2	0	0	1	66	39th
2026	ARCA Menards Series	Rette Jones Racing	3	0	0	1	81	52nd

=== ARCA Menards Series ===
(key) (Bold – Pole position awarded by qualifying time. Italics – Pole position earned by points standings or practice time. * – Most laps led.)

ARCA Menards Series results
Year	Team	No.	Make	1	2	3	4	5	6	7	8	9	10	11	12	13	14	15	16	17	18	19	20	AMSC	Pts	Ref
2026	Rette Jones Racing	0	Ford	DAY	PHO	KAN; 12	TAL; 29	GLN	TOL	MCH; 10	POC	BER	ELK	CHI	LRP	IRP	IOW	ISF	MAD	DSF	SLM	BRI	KAN	52nd	81	

==== ARCA Menards Series East ====
ARCA Menards Series East results
Year	Team	No.	Make	1	2	3	4	5	6	7	8	AMSEC	Pts	Ref
2026	Rette Jones Racing	0	Ford	HCY; 13	CAR; 9	NSV	TOL	IRP	FRS	IOW	BRI	39th	66	
