= Rette Jones Racing =

NASCAR team

- Owner(s): Terry Jones; Mark Rette
- Series: ARCA Menards Series; ARCA Menards Series East; NASCAR Euro Series
- Race drivers: ARCA Menards Series: 0. George Siciliano; NASCAR Euro Series: 30. Vanessa Neumann (OPEN)
- Manufacturer: Chevrolet
- Opened: 2015

Career
- Debut: NASCAR Xfinity Series: 2024 BetMGM 300 (Charlotte); Gander RV & Outdoors Truck Series: 2015 Careers for Veterans 200 (Michigan); ARCA Menards Series: 2015 Lucas Oil 200 (Daytona); ARCA Menards Series East: 2015 NAPA 150 (Columbus); ARCA Menards Series West: 2020 Arizona Lottery 100 (Phoenix)
- Races competed: Total: 166; Xfinity Series: 4 Gander RV & Outdoors Truck Series: 9 ARCA Menards Series: 71; ARCA Menards Series East: 77; ARCA Menards Series West: 5
- Drivers' Championships: Total: 0 Xfinity Series: 0 Gander RV & Outdoors Truck Series: 0 ARCA Menards Series: 0 ARCA Menards Series East: 0 ARCA Menards Series West: 0
- Race victories: Total: 2 Xfinity Series: 0 Gander RV & Outdoors Truck Series: 0 ARCA Menards Series: 0 ARCA Menards Series East: 2 ARCA Menards Series West: 0
- Pole positions: Total: 2 Xfinity Series: 0 Gander RV & Outdoors Truck Series: 0 ARCA Menards Series: 1 ARCA Menards Series East: 1 ARCA Menards Series West: 0

Rette Jones Racing is an American professional stock car racing team that currently competes in the ARCA Menards Series and NASCAR Euro Series. The team is owned by Terry Jones and friend Mark Rette and currently field the No. 0 Chevrolet SS full-time for George Siciliano in the ARCA Menards Series.

== NASCAR Xfinity Series ==
=== Car No. 30 history ===
On April 30, 2024, the team announced that it would field a part-time entry for Noah Gragson in the No. 30 Ford Mustang Dark Horse in four races beginning at Charlotte, with a technical alliance with Stewart–Haas Racing. Gragson finished in the top-15 in all four races, including a fifth-place finish at Nashville.

==== Car No. 30 results ====
Year	Team	No.	Make	1	2	3	4	5	6	7	8	9	10	11	12	13	14	15	16	17	18	19	20	21	22	23	24	25	26	27	28	29	30	31	32	33	Owners	Pts	Ref
2024	Noah Gragson	30	Ford	DAY	ATL	LVS	PHO	COA	RCH	MAR	TEX	TAL	DOV	DAR	CLT; 10	PIR	SON	IOW	NHA	NSH; 5	CSC	POC	IND	MCH; 6	DAY	DAR; 15	ATL	GLN	BRI	KAN	TAL	ROV	LVS	HOM	MAR	PHO	41st	125	

== NASCAR Gander RV & Outdoors Truck Series ==
=== Truck No. 02 history ===
Dominique Van Wieringen made her Truck Series' debut at Phoenix driving No. 02 Ford for RJR in a technical alliance with Young's Motorsports. She finished 31st after being involved in a crash with Austin Wayne Self and Tommy Joe Martins in the early laps of the race.

==== Truck No. 02 results ====
Year	Driver	No.	Make	1	2	3	4	5	6	7	8	9	10	11	12	13	14	15	16	17	18	19	20	21	22	23	Owner	Pts
2016	Dominique Van Wieringen	02	Ford	DAY	ATL	MAR	KAN	DOV	CLT	TEX	IOW	GTW	KEN	ELD	POC	BRI	MCH	MSP	CHI	NHA	LVS	TAL	MAR	TEX	PHO; 31	HOM		

=== Truck No. 11 history ===
In 2019, Spencer Davis would also drive at the renumbered No. 11 Ford at Martinsville. Starting at Kentucky, the team switched to Toyota and also drove at Las Vegas, and attempted the race at Homestead-Miami but failed to qualify. The 11 would still continue, but Davis would move to his own team Spencer Davis Motorsports.

==== Truck No. 11 results ====
Year	Driver	No.	Make	1	2	3	4	5	6	7	8	9	10	11	12	13	14	15	16	17	18	19	20	21	22	23	Owner	Pts
2019	Spencer Davis	11	Ford	DAY	ATL	LVS	MAR; 20	TEX	DOV	KAN	CLT	TEX	IOW	GTW	CHI													
2019	Spencer Davis	11	Toyota													KEN; 8	POC	ELD	MCH	BRI	MSP	LVS; 18	TAL	MAR	PHO	HOM; DNQ		

=== Truck No. 30 history ===
The team debuted at the 2015 Careers for Veterans 200 at Michigan International Speedway with Chad Finley driving the No. 30 Ford. Although Finley would qualify 15th, he would be forced to start at the back due to a window net problem. He would quickly move up to 21st, but was unable to improve on that, and finished there four laps down. Finley would return for the American Ethanol E15 225 at Chicagoland Speedway, where he would qualify 16th and finish 21st, nine laps down. The No. 30 would appear one more time in 2015 with team co-owner Terry Jones at the Fred's 250 at Talladega Superspeedway, but that time was a Chevrolet truck. Although the team would qualify 25th, they would crash after completing 35 laps and be eliminated, placing 31st.

In 2016, the team returned at Charlotte with Jesse Little behind the wheel of the No. 30 Toyota Tundra but after performing well in practice, the qualify was rained out and set by Owners' points, so the team failed to qualify. So the team attempted the following race at Texas, but now with the No. 81, after made a partnership with Hattori Racing Enterprises and finished 19th.

The team would return in 2017 in a one-off attempt at the NextEra Energy Resources 250 at Daytona International Speedway with Terry Jones driving the No. 30 Ford, again. The team would manage to make the race qualifying 24th, but would get caught in The Big One on lap 4 and place 25th.

==== Truck No. 30 results ====
Year	Driver	No.	Make	1	2	3	4	5	6	7	8	9	10	11	12	13	14	15	16	17	18	19	20	21	22	23	Owner	Pts
2015	Chad Finley	30	Ford	DAY	ATL	MAR	KAN	CLT	DOV	TEX	GTW	IOW	KEN	ELD	POC	MCH; 21	BRI	MSP	CHI; 21	NHA	LVS							
2015	Terry Jones	30	Chevy																			TAL; 31	MAR	TEX	PHO	HOM		
2016	Jesse Little	30	Toyota	DAY	ATL	MAR	KAN	DOV	CLT; DNQ	TEX	IOW	GTW	KEN	ELD	POC	BRI	MCH	MSP	CHI	NHA	LVS	TAL	MAR	TEX	PHO	HOM		
2017	Terry Jones	30	Ford	DAY; 25	ATL	MAR	KAN	CLT	DOV	TEX	GTW	IOW	KEN	ELD	POC	MCH	BRI	MSP	CHI	NHA	LVS	TAL	MAR	TEX	PHO	HOM		

=== Truck No. 82 history ===
In 2019, the team would sign Spencer Davis to drive in 5 races in 2019. The team would first attempt the NextEra Energy 250 at Daytona International Speedway under the No. 82 Ford banner, but would fail to qualify.

==== Truck No. 82 results ====
Year	Driver	No.	Make	1	2	3	4	5	6	7	8	9	10	11	12	13	14	15	16	17	18	19	20	21	22	23	Owner	Pts
2019	Spencer Davis	82	Ford	DAY; DNQ	ATL	LVS	MAR	TEX	DOV	KAN	CLT	TEX	IOW	GTW	CHI	KEN	POC	ELD	MCH	BRI	MSP	LVS	TAL	MAR	PHO	HOM		

== ARCA Menards Series ==
=== Car No. 0 history ===
In 2026, George Siciliano would make his debut in the National Series of the ARCA platform, the ARCA Menards Series, at Kansas Speedway piloting the No. 0 for Ford Fusion.

In October 2026, it was revealed RJR would switch to Chevrolet and that Siciliano will drive full-time for them in the main ARCA series in 2027, driving the No. 0 Chevrolet SS.

==== Car No. 0 results ====
Year	Driver	No.	Make	1	2	3	4	5	6	7	8	9	10	11	12	13	14	15	16	17	18	19	20	Owners	Pts
2026	George Siciliano	0	Ford	DAY	PHO	KAN; 12	TAL; 29	GLN	TOL; 10	MCH	POC	BER	ELK	CHI	LRP	IRP	IOW	ISF	MAD	DSF	SLM	BRI	KAN	-*	-*

=== Car No. 29 history ===
On February 5, 2025, it was announced that the team would field the No. 29 car for Kyle Steckly in the ARCA Menards Series, with his first race coming at the season opening race at Daytona International Speedway in 2025, after signing a multiyear deal with the team.

==== Car No. 29 results ====
Year	Driver	No.	Make	1	2	3	4	5	6	7	8	9	10	11	12	13	14	15	16	17	18	19	20	Owners	Pts
2025	Kyle Steckly	29	Ford	DAY; 32	PHO	TAL	KAN	CLT	MCH	BER	ELK	LRP	DOV	IRP	IOW	GLN	ISF	MAD	DSF	BRI	SLM	KAN	TOL	72nd	12

=== Car No. 30 history ===
Before the team's founding in 2015, Terry Jones had been fielding cars in the ARCA Racing Series since 2003, usually for himself, in around 4-8 races each year, and the team was called Jones Group Racing. Bob Blount, Chad Blount and Jesse Smith also had driven for Jones. The team had six top-fives and 12 top-tens in 64 races between 2003 and 2013.

Rette Jones Racing made the series debut at Daytona with Terry Jones behind the wheel of the No. 30 Toyota as usual and finished 19th. He also ran at Talladega, where he finished 16th.

In 2016, Corey Deuser made his series debut at the Herr's Potato Chips 200 at Winchester Speedway driving the No. 30 Ford Fusion, he would start in 7th, but the team would suffer a clutch issue relegating them to a 17th-place finish. Rette Jones would return with Clair Zimmerman behind the wheel of the No. 30 Ford at Berlin Raceway for the Berlin ARCA 200, where he would finish sixth upon starting 12th. Terry Jones once again drove at Daytona and Talladega and crashed in both of them, with a season-best finish of 28th at Talladega.

In 2017, Terry Jones returned at Daytona, in the No. 30 Toyota, he led 25 laps and finished second, the best finish ever of the team in the ARCA Series. Jones returned at Talladega, driving the No. 33 Toyota in a partnership with Win-Tron Racing but he blew the engine in the early laps and finished last.

In 2018, Grant Quinlan would drive in a one-off attempt the No. 30 Ford, at the Lucas Oil 200 at Daytona International Speedway. The team would start 24th, but finish 37th after an engine problem.

In 2019, Quinlan would return driving a Ford at Daytona, as well as Talladega for the General Tire 200. Quinlan would perform very well at both events, scoring top-tens in both and a top-five at Daytona.

In 2020, Dominique Van Wieringen ran the season-opener, crashing out for 25th.

In 2021, the team had attempted more than half of the season, drivers like ARCA Menards Series West graduate Brittney Zamora, late model driver Cole Williams, Mexican ARCA Menards Series East full-timer Max Gutiérrez, road course ringer Kris Wright, United States Auto Club Midget standout Adam Lemke, and dirt track star Landen Lewis.

In 2022, Amber Balcaen ran for the No. 30 car full-time, finishing seventh in series points. On January 11, 2023, it was announced that actor Frankie Muniz would be replacing Balcaen, with the team upgrading their cars from Ford Fusions to Mustangs.

On February 5, 2024, it was announced that Justin Bonsignore would make his ARCA Menards Series debut at Daytona International Speedway, driving the No. 30 car. Muniz drove the No. 30 at Talladega to a 9th place finish. Conor Daly made his ARCA debut at Mid-Ohio Sports Car Course. Dylan Lupton drove the No. 30 car to a 10th place finish at Watkins Glen.

In 2025, it was revealed that Garrett Mitchell would participate in the pre-season test for the ARCA Menards Series at Daytona International Speedway, driving the No. 30 Ford. On January 15, it was announced on Facebook that Mitchell would drive in the season opener at Daytona for RJR also as Garrett Mitchell. He finished in 30th after being involved in a multi-car crash over a quarter of the way through the race. Mitchell would continue to announce that he would return with the team at Talladega Superspeedway, Charlotte Motor Speedway, and the ARCA Menards Series East combination race at Bristol Motor Speedway.

After the race at Bristol, it was confirmed that Mitchell will return to ARCA in 2026 on a partial schedule.

==== Car No. 30 results ====
Year	Driver	No.	Make	1	2	3	4	5	6	7	8	9	10	11	12	13	14	15	16	17	18	19	20	Owners	Pts
2015	Terry Jones	30	Toyota	DAY; 19	MOB	NSH	SLM	TAL; 16	TOL	NJE	POC	MCH	CHI	WIN	IOW	IRP	POC	BLN	ISF	DSF	SLM	KEN	KAN		
2016	Terry Jones	30	Toyota	DAY; 40	NSH	SLM	TAL; 28	TOL	NJE	POC	MCH	MAD													
2016	Corey Deuser	30	Ford										WIN; 17	IOW	IRP	POC									
2016	Clair Zimmerman	30	Ford														BLN; 6	ISF	DSF	SLM	CHI	KEN	KAN		
2017	Terry Jones	30	Toyota	DAY; 2*	NSH	SLM	TAL	TOL	ELK	POC	MCH	MAD	IOW	IRP	POC	WIN	ISF	ROA	DSF	SLM	CHI	KEN	KAN		
2018	Grant Quinlan	30	Ford	DAY; 37	NSH	SLM	TAL	TOL	CLT	POC	MCH	MAD	GTW	CHI	IOW	ELK	POC	ISF	BLN	DSF	SLM	IRP	KAN		
2019	Grant Quinlan	30	Ford	DAY; 3	FIF	SLM	TAL; 9	NSH	TOL	CLT	POC	MCH	MAD	GTW	CHI	ELK	IOW	POC	ISF	DSF	SLM	IRP	KAN		
2020	Dominique Van Wieringen	30	Ford	DAY; 25	PHO	TAL	POC	IRP	KEN	IOW	KAN	TOL	TOL	MCH	DAY	GTW	L44	TOL	BRI	WIN	MEM	ISF	KAN	50th	19
2021	Brittney Zamora	30	Ford	DAY; 34	PHO	TAL	KAN																	15th	394
2021	Cole Williams	30	Ford					TOL; 6																15th	394
2021	Max Gutiérrez	30	Ford						CLT; 15					IOW; 12					MLW; 15	DSF	BRI; 14			15th	394
2021	Kris Wright	30	Ford							MOH; 8	POC; 24				WIN; 8	GLN; 13	MCH	ISF					KAN; 6	15th	394
2021	Adam Lemke	30	Ford									ELK; 10	BLN											15th	394
2021	Landen Lewis	30	Ford																			SLM; 13		15th	394
2022	Amber Balcaen	30	Ford	DAY; 16	PHO; 30	TAL; 12	KAN; 9	CLT; 7	IOW; 10	BLN; 11	ELK; 17	MOH; 15	POC; 21	IRP; 21	MCH; 18	GLN; 19		MLW; 14		KAN; 8	BRI; 31	SLM; 9	TOL; 10	10th	774
2022	Amber Balcaen	30	Toyota														ISF; 14		DSF; 14					10th	774
2023	Frankie Muniz	30	Ford	DAY; 11	PHO; 6	TAL; 9	KAN; 8	CLT; 6	BLN; 6	ELK; 16	MOH; 6	IOW; 9	POC; 21	MCH; 5	IRP; 11	GLN; 16	ISF; 7	MLW; 12	DSF; 12	KAN; 18	BRI; 23	SLM; 10	TOL; 8	7th	860
2024	Justin Bonsignore	30	Ford	DAY; 32	PHO																			35th	117
2024	Frankie Muniz	30	Ford			TAL; 9	DOV	KAN	CLT	IOW														35th	117
2024	Conor Daly	30	Ford								MOH; 8	BLN	IRP	SLM	ELK	MCH	ISF	MLW	DSF					35th	117
2024	Dylan Lupton	30	Ford																	GLN; 10	BRI	KAN	TOL	35th	117
2025	Garrett Mitchell	30	Ford	DAY; 30	PHO	TAL; 10	KAN	CLT; 9	MCH	BLN	ELK	LRP	DOV	IRP	IOW	GLN	ISF	MAD	DSF	BRI; 17	SLM	KAN	TOL	37th	110
2026	Garrett Mitchell	30	Ford	DAY; 11	PHO	KAN; 20	TAL; 2	GLN	TOL	MCH; 14	POC	BER	ELK	CHI	LRP	IRP	IOW	ISF	MAD	DSF	SLM	BRI	KAN	35th	132

=== Car No. 76 history ===
In 2026, the team fielded the No. 76 car in collaboration with Wayne Peterson Racing for Kole Raz at Daytona.

==== Car No. 76 results ====
Year	Driver	No.	Make	1	2	3	4	5	6	7	8	9	10	11	12	13	14	15	16	17	18	19	20	Owners	Pts
2026	Kole Raz	76	Ford	DAY; 3	PHO	KAN	TAL	GLN	TOL	MCH	POC	BER	ELK	CHI	LRP	IRP	IOW	ISF	MAD	DSF	SLM	BRI	KAN	-*	-*

=== Other teams ===
Max Gutiérrez drove the No. 32 for AM Racing, under the Rette Jones Racing banner in the 2022 Lucas Oil 200.

== ARCA Menards Series East ==
=== Car No. 0 history ===
On March 9, 2026, it was announced that Garrett Mitchell's friend George Siciliano would make his ARCA Menards Series East debut at Hickory driving the No. 0 Ford Fusion. He would make his 2nd career start a week later, at Rockingham. He would start 13th and finish 9th, earning his first career top 10 finish.

==== Car No. 0 results ====
Year	Driver	No.	Make	1	2	3	4	5	6	7	8	Owners	Pts
2026	George Siciliano	0	Ford	HCY; 13	ROC; 9	NSV	TOL	IRP	FRS	IOW	BRI	-*	-*

=== Car No. 28 history ===
The No. 28 Ford of RJR also made his debut in the 2016 season, with Clair Zimmerman, he drove the No. 28 in two races, with a best finish of 16th. Dominique Van Wieringen also drove the No. 28 in one race in 2016, and finished tenth.

In 2017, the team returned, with Dylan Murry, he drove the No. 28 Ford in two races (Greenville and Watkins Glen) and finished sixth and eighth respectively. Grant Quinlan also drove the No. 28 in one race and finished eighth.

==== Car No. 28 results ====
Year	Driver	No.	Make	1	2	3	4	5	6	7	8	9	10	11	12	13	14	Owners	Pts
2016	Clair Zimmerman	28	Ford	NSM	MOB	GRE	BRI	VIR	DOM; 20	STA	COL	NHA	IOW	GLN	GRE	NJM	DOV; 16		
2017	Dylan Murry	28	Ford	NSM	GRE; 6	BRI	SBO	SBO	MEM	BLN	TMP	NHA	IOW	GLN; 8	LGY				
2017	Grant Quinlan	28	Ford													NJE; 8	DOV		

=== Car No. 29 history ===
The No. 29 of RJR made his debut in 2016, Jesse Little was scheduled to drive five races for the team, but he withdrew after the qualify at Bristol. Little had two top-fives and three top-tens, in the four races he ran behind the wheel of the No. 29 Toyota, with a best-finish of second. Grant Quinlan drove the No. 29 Ford in one race and finished 18th. Corey Deuser ran two races behind the wheel of the No. 29 Ford, with a best-finish of 12th.

==== Car No. 29 results ====
Year	Driver	No.	Make	1	2	3	4	5	6	7	8	9	10	11	12	13	14	Owners	Pts
2016	Jesse Little	29	Toyota	NSM	MOB; 3	GRE	BRI; Wth	VIR	DOM			NHA; 17	IOW; 7	GLN			DOV; 2		
2016	Grant Quinlan	29	Ford							STA; 18									
2016	Corey Deuser	29	Ford								COL; 12				GRE; 19	NJM			

=== Car No. 30 history ===
Rette Jones Racing made their NASCAR K&N Pro Series East debut with Grant Quinlan driving the No. 30 Ford Fusion in 2015, at Columbus, he led 63 laps and finished second. Quinlan also drove at New Hampshire and Richmond but finished 15th and 20th, respectively.

In 2016, the team ran full-time with Dominique Van Wieringen behind the wheel. She had three top-fives and four top-tens in 14 races, with a best finish of third (twice).

In 2017, the team returned full-time with Tyler Dippel behind the wheel. At Visit Hampton VA 150 in Langley, Dominique Van Wieringen replaced Dippel, who was running an ARCA race at DuQuoin, Van Wieringen would finished third. Dippel had two top-fives and four top-tens in the other 13 races.

In 2018, the team ran full-time once again but with multiple drivers, Dippel drove at the season opener and finished ninth, Quinlan drove six races, with a pole-position (the first of the team) and had two top-fives and four top-tens, and Dominique's younger brother, Tristan Van Wieringen, drove seven races for the team, with a best finish of ninth.

In 2019, Spencer Davis drove full-time with the team, he ran with No. 82 at the season opener at New Smyrna and finished seventh, and starting for the second race onwards, the car was renumbered back to No. 30. Davis ended the season with one win (the first of the team) at Gateway, six top-fives, and 11 top-tens in 12 races.

In 2020, Tristan Van Wieringen will run full-time for the team.

In 2021, Max Gutiérrez will run full-time for the team.

In 2022, Gutiérrez would return for New Smyrna and Dover, while Amber Balcaen will run the final three combination events.

In 2023, Frankie Muniz would drive the No. 30 at four combined ARCA Menards Series events.

In 2025, Garrett Mitchell drove the No. 30 at Bristol.

In 2026, Mitchell would drive the No. 30 at Rockingham, where he would finish in fourth place.

==== Car No. 30 results ====
Year	Driver	No.	Make	1	2	3	4	5	6	7	8	9	10	11	12	13	14	Owners	Pts
2015	Grant Quinlan	30	Ford	NSM	GRE	BRI	IOW	BGS	LGY	COL; 2	NHA; 15	IOW	GLN	MOT	VIR	RCH; 20	DOV		
2016	Dominique Van Wieringen	30	Ford	NSM; 10	MOB; 20	GRE; 16	BRI; 11	VIR; 18	DOM; 24	STA; 16	COL; 13	NHA; 27	IOW; 10	GLN; 16	GRE; 3	NJM; 5	DOV; 3		
2017	Tyler Dippel	30	Ford	NSM; 23	GRE; 5	BRI; 13	SBO; 16	SBO; 12	MEM; 12	BLN; 7	TMP; 20	NHA; 6	IOW; 13	GLN; 12		NJM; 11	DOV; 3		
2017	Dominique Van Wieringen	30	Ford												LGY; 3				
2018	Tyler Dippel	30	Ford	NSM; 9															
2018	Grant Quinlan	30	Ford		BRI; 19	LGY; 5	SBO; 10	SBO; 7*	MEM; 11	NJE; 4									
2018	Tristan Van Wieringen	30	Ford								TMP; 11	NHA; 9	IOW; 14	GLN; 24	GTW; 17	NHA; 11	DOV; 13		
2019	Spencer Davis	30	Ford	NSM	BRI; 5	SBO; 4	SBO; 5	MEM; 14	NHA; 7	IOW; 9	GLN; 8	BRI; 5*	GTW; 1	NHA; 4	DOV; 7				
2020	Tristan Van Wieringen	30	Ford	NSM; 11	TOL	DOV	TOL	BRI	FIF										
2021	Max Gutiérrez	30	Ford	NSM; 1	FIF; 7	NSV; 9	DOV; 5	SNM; 10	IOW; 12	MLW; 15	BRI; 14								
2022	Max Gutiérrez	30	Ford	NSM; 3	FIF	DOV; Wth	NSV												
2022	Amber Balcaen	30	Ford					IOW; 10	MLW; 14	BRI; 31									
2023	Frankie Muniz	30	Ford	FIF	DOV	NSV	FRS	IOW; 9	IRP; 11	MLW; 12	BRI; 23								
2025	Garrett Mitchell	30	Ford	FIF	CAR	NSV	FRS	DOV	IRP	IOW	BRI; 17								
2026	Garrett Mitchell	30	Ford	HCY	ROC; 4	NSV	TOL	IRP	FRS	IOW	BRI							38th	40

== ARCA Menards Series West ==
=== Car No. 30 history ===
In 2020, Rette Jones Racing made their ARCA Menards Series West debut with Justin Lofton driving the No. 30 Ford Fusion at Phoenix. He finished sixth.

In 2021, Max Gutiérrez drove the No. 30 at Phoenix. He started 12th and finished 21st.

In 2022, Amber Balcaen drove the No. 30 at Phoenix.

In 2023, Frankie Muniz drove the No. 30 at Phoenix.

In 2024, Noah Gragson drove the No. 30 at Sonoma.

==== Car No. 30 results ====
Year	Drivers	No.	Make	1	2	3	4	5	6	7	8	9	10	11	12	Owners	Pts
2020	Justin Lofton	30	Ford	LVS	MMP	MMP	IRW	EVG	DCS	CNS	LVS	AAS	KCR	PHO; 6			
2021	Max Gutiérrez	30	Ford	PHO	SON	IRW	CNS	IRW	PIR	LVS	AAS	PHO; 21					
2022	Amber Balcaen	30	Ford	PHO; 30	IRW	KCR	PIR	SON	IRW	EVG	PIR	AAS	LVS	PHO			
2023	Frankie Muniz	30	Ford	PHO; 6	IRW	KCR	PIR	SON	IRW	SHA	EVG	AAS	LVS	MAD	PHO		
2024	Noah Gragson	30	Ford	PHO	KER	PIR	SON; 16	IRW	IRW	SHA	TRI	MAD	AAS	KER	PHO		

== NASCAR Euro Series ==
=== Car No. 30 history ===
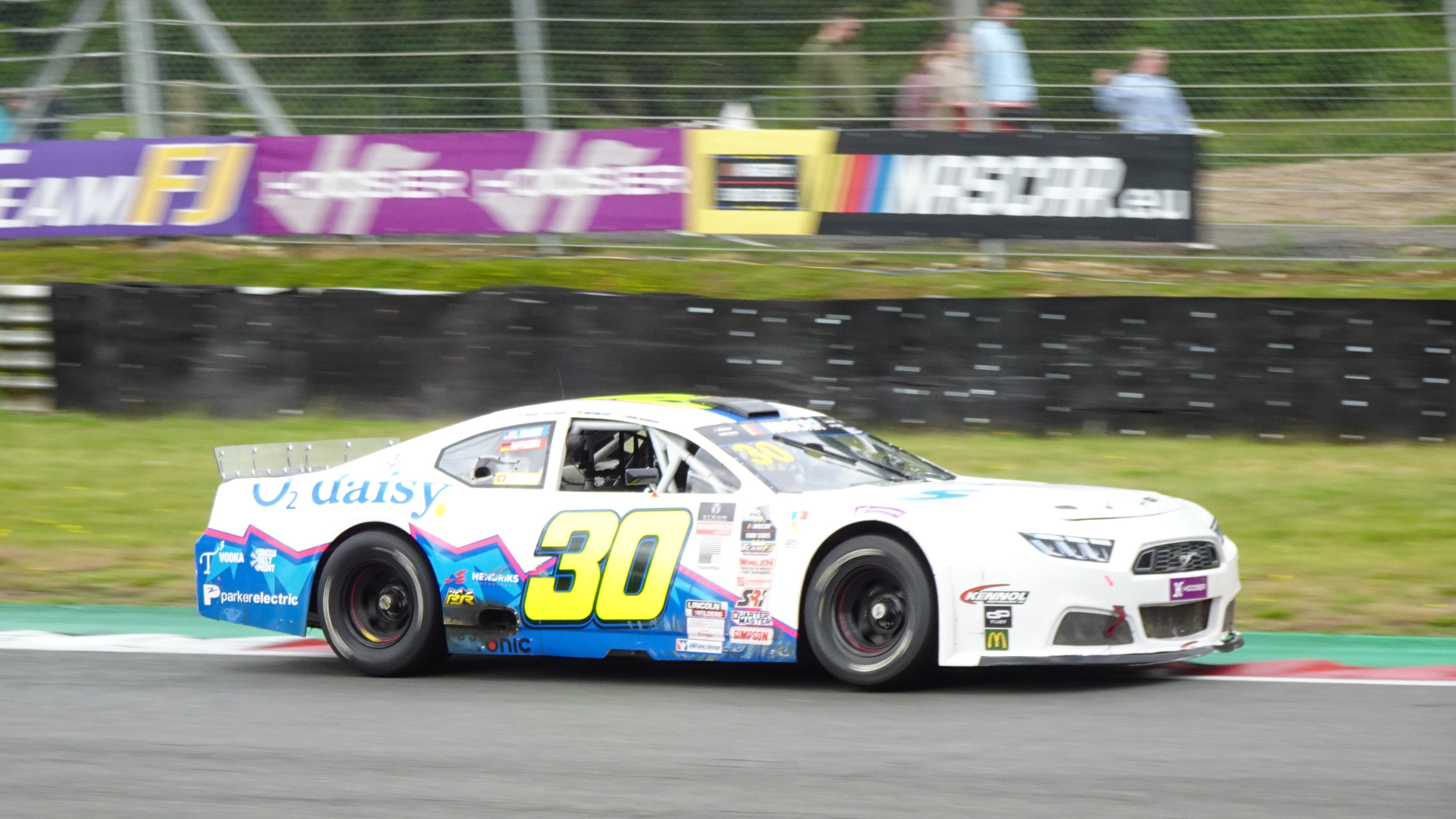
The #30 Rette Jones entry in the 2026 NASCAR Euro Series

In 2025, Rette Jones Racing announced that they will be entering the NASCAR Euro Series. Rette Jones will field the No. 30 Ford Mustang with technical support from Dutch team Hendriks Motorsport. As a result of this technical support deal, Rette Jones signed former Hendriks drivers Liam Hezemans and Gil Linster as their full-time drivers in the PRO and OPEN divisions respectively.

==== Car No. 30 results ====
NASCAR Euro Series - PRO
Year	Drivers	No.	Make	1	2	3	4	5	6	7	8	9	10	11	12	Pos.	Pts
2025	(Netherlands) Liam Hezemans	30	Ford	ESP; 5	ESP; 6	ITA; 19	ITA; 2	GBR; 5	GBR; 19*	NED; 19	CZE; 3	GER; 1*	GER; 21	BEL; 2	BEL; 4	4th	455
NASCAR Euro Series - OPEN
Year	Drivers	No.	Make	1	2	3	4	5	6	7	8	9	10	11	12	Pos.	Pts
2025	(Luxembourg) Gil Linster	30	Ford	ESP; 2	ESP; 4	ITA; 17	ITA; 17			CZE; 11	CZE; 17	GER; 3	GER; 4	BEL; 6	BEL; 19	11th	390
2025	(Netherlands) Michael Bleekemolen	30	Ford					GBR; 21	GBR; 17							18th	264
2026	(Germany) Vanessa Neumann	30	Ford														
NASCAR Euro Series - V8GP
Year	Drivers	No.	Make	1	2	3	4	5	6	7	8	9	10	11	12	Pos.	Pts
2026	(United States) Logan Bearden	30	Ford	ESP; 9	ESP; 10	FRA; 13	FRA; 15	GBR; 18	GBR; 9	CZE; 6	CZE; 8	ITA	ITA	BEL; 13	BEL; 8	19th	295
NASCAR Euro Series - Rookie Challange
Year	Drivers	No.	Make	1	2	3	4	5	Pos.	Pts							
2026	(Switzerland) Maral Ghazarian	30	Ford	ESP	FRA	CZE	ITA	BEL									

== Other series ==
The team's late model and NASCAR Pinty's Series operations are known as Kasey Jones Racing.
