= 2026 Tide 150 =

ARCA Menards Series race at Kansas Speedway

Race details
- Race 3 of 20 in the 2026 ARCA Menards Series
- Date: April 18, 2026
- Location: Kansas Speedway in Kansas City, Kansas
- Course: Permanent racing facility
- Course length: 1.5 miles (2.4 km)
- Distance: 108 laps, 162 mi (260.712 km)
- Scheduled distance: 100 laps, 150 mi (241.402 km)
- Average speed: 97.054 miles per hour (156.193 km/h)

Pole position
Driver	Jack Wood	Pinnacle Racing Group
- Grid positions set by competition-based formula

Most laps led
Driver	Gio Ruggiero	Joe Gibbs Racing
- Laps: 50

Fastest lap
Driver	Jack Wood	Pinnacle Racing Group
- Time: 30.925

Winner
No. 18	Gio Ruggiero	Joe Gibbs Racing

Television in the United States
- Network: FS1
- Announcers: Eric Brennan, Phil Parsons, and Austin Cindric

Radio in the United States
- Radio: MRN
- Booth announcers: Alex Hayden, Mike Bagley, and Todd Gordon
- Turn announcers: Dave Moody (1 & 2) and Tim Catafalmo (3 & 4)

The 2026 Tide 150 was an ARCA Menards Series race held on Saturday, April 18, 2026, at Kansas Speedway in Kansas City, Kansas. Contested over 108 laps—extended from 100 laps due to a double overtime finish on the 1.5-mile (2.4 km) asphalt speedway, it was the third race of the 2026 ARCA Menards Series season, and the seventh running of the event.

Gio Ruggiero, driving for Joe Gibbs Racing, took the victory in a controversial fashion, holding off Daniel Dye on the final restart to earn his second career ARCA Menards Series win, and his second of the season. Ruggiero had dominated half of the race as well, leading a race-high 50 laps. Dye finished second, and Jake Bollman finished third. Gavan Boschele and Lanie Buice rounded out the top five, while Jason Kitzmiller, Jade Avedisian, Monty Tipton, Thomas Annunziata, and Dystany Spurlock rounded out the top ten.

Prior to the restart, Ruggiero faced criticism after a late wreck with Spurlock. Late in the event, Ruggiero was passed by Jack Wood for the lead and eventually lost second to Daniel Dye. With two laps to go, while attempting to get around the lap car of Spurlock, he would end up bumping into the back of her, resulting in a spin and bringing out an overtime caution. Spurlock did not end up losing positions and finished tenth in her ARCA national series debut.

== Report ==
=== Background ===
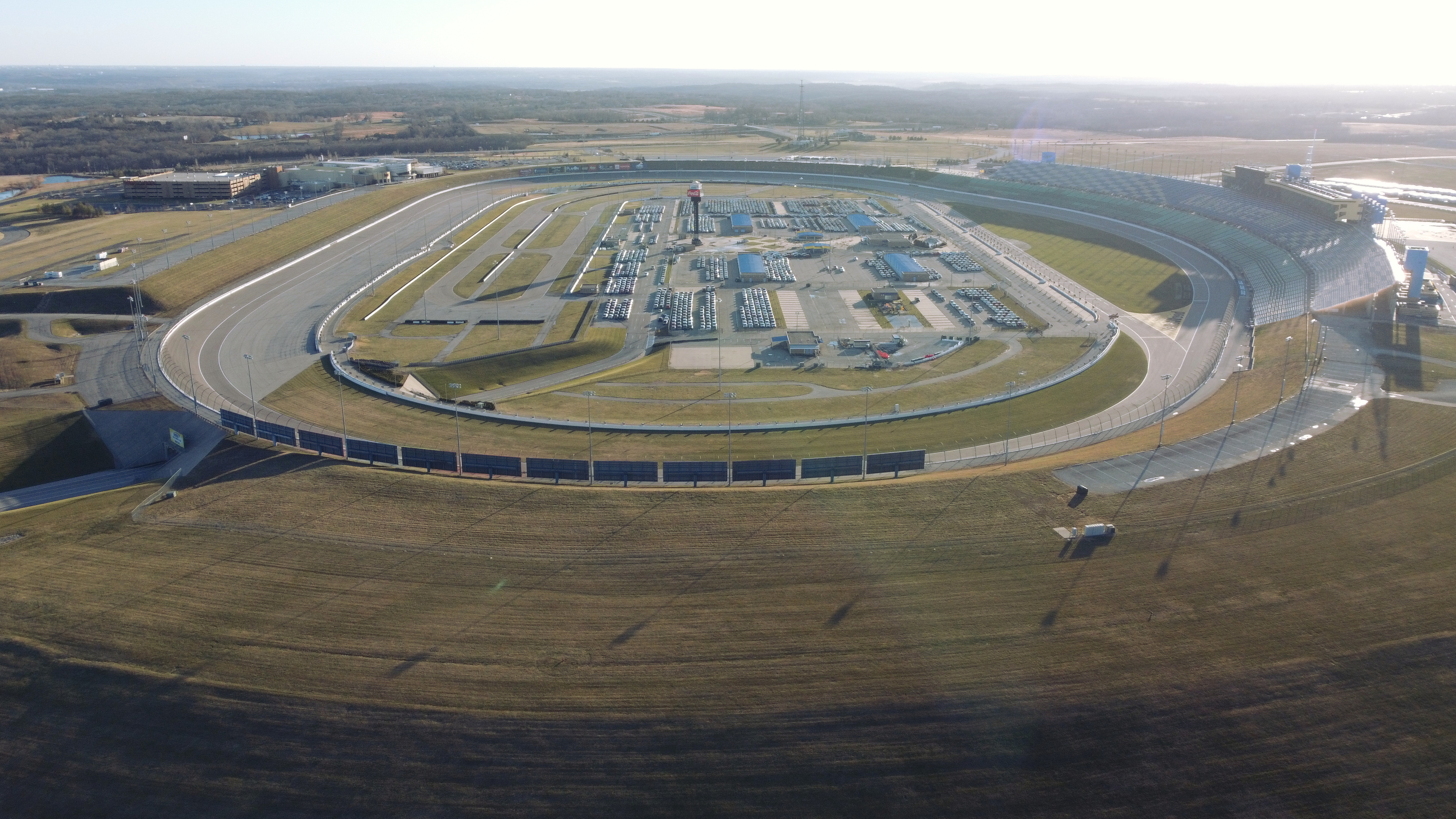
The layout of Kansas Speedway, the track where the race will be held.

Kansas Speedway is a 1.5-mile (2.4 km) tri-oval race track in Kansas City, Kansas. It was built in 2001 and hosts two annual NASCAR race weekends. The NTT IndyCar Series also raced there until 2011. The speedway is owned and operated by NASCAR.

==== Entry list ====
- (R) denotes rookie driver.

#	Driver	Team	Make
0	George Siciliano	Rette Jones Racing	Ford
01	D. L. Wilson	Fast Track Racing	Ford
1	Nate Moeller	Maples Motorsports	Chevrolet
03	Alex Clubb	Clubb Racing Inc.	Ford
06	Brayton Laster	Wayne Peterson Motorsports	Chevrolet
10	Craig Pellegrini Jr.	Fast Track Racing	Toyota
11	Robbie Kennealy	Fast Track Racing	Chevrolet
12	Takuma Koga	Fast Track Racing	Toyota
15	Jade Avedisian	Nitro Motorsports	Toyota
17	Monty Tipton	Cook Racing Technologies	Toyota
18	Gio Ruggiero	Joe Gibbs Racing	Toyota
19	Matt Kemp	Maples Motorsports	Chevrolet
20	Jake Bollman (R)	Nitro Motorsports	Toyota
24	Daniel Dye	SPS Racing	Chevrolet
25	Gavan Boschele (R)	Nitro Motorsports	Toyota
28	Jack Wood	Pinnacle Racing Group	Chevrolet
30	Garrett Mitchell	Rette Jones Racing	Ford
48	Brad Smith	Brad Smith Motorsports	Ford
55	Isabella Robusto	Nitro Motorsports	Toyota
66	Dystany Spurlock	MBM Motorsports	Ford
69	Will Kimmel	Kimmel Racing	Ford
70	Thomas Annunziata	Nitro Motorsports	Toyota
71	Andy Jankowiak	KLAS Motorsports	Chevrolet
77	Lanie Buice	Pinnacle Racing Group	Chevrolet
86	Jeff Maconi (R)	Clubb Racing Inc.	Ford
89	Bobby Dale Earnhardt	Rise Racing	Chevrolet
91	Ryan Vargas	Maples Motorsports	Ford
97	Jason Kitzmiller	CR7 Motorsports	Chevrolet
99	Michael Maples	Maples Motorsports	Chevrolet
Official entry list

== Optional Practice ==
An optional pre-race practice session was held on Friday, April 17, at 8:30 AM CST, and lasted for 4 hours.

Gio Ruggiero, driving for Joe Gibbs Racing, set the fastest time in the session, with a lap of 31.314 seconds, and a speed of 172.447 miles per hour (277.527 km/h).

=== Pre-race practice results ===
Pos.	#	Driver	Team	Make	Time	Speed
1	18	Gio Ruggiero	Joe Gibbs Racing	Toyota	31.314	172.447
2	77	Lanie Buice	Pinnacle Racing Group	Chevrolet	31.572	171.038
3	28	Jack Wood	Pinnacle Racing Group	Chevrolet	31.686	170.422
Full pre-race practice results

== Starting lineup ==
Practice and qualifying were originally scheduled to be held on Friday, April 17, at 4:00 PM and 5:00 PM CST respectively, but were both canceled due to inclement weather. The starting lineup was determined by 2025 owners' points. As a result, Jack Wood, driving for Pinnacle Racing Group, was awarded the pole.

=== Starting lineup ===
Pos.	#	Driver	Team	Make
1	28	Jack Wood	Pinnacle Racing Group	Chevrolet
2	18	Gio Ruggiero	Joe Gibbs Racing	Toyota
3	20	Jake Bollman (R)	Nitro Motorsports	Toyota
4	77	Lanie Buice	Pinnacle Racing Group	Chevrolet
5	25	Gavan Boschele (R)	Nitro Motorsports	Toyota
6	70	Thomas Annunziata	Nitro Motorsports	Toyota
7	97	Jason Kitzmiller	CR7 Motorsports	Chevrolet
8	55	Isabella Robusto	Nitro Motorsports	Toyota
9	12	Takuma Koga	Fast Track Racing	Toyota
10	03	Alex Clubb	Clubb Racing Inc.	Ford
11	99	Michael Maples	Maples Motorsports	Chevrolet
12	10	Craig Pellegrini Jr.	Fast Track Racing	Toyota
13	06	Brayton Laster	Wayne Peterson Motorsports	Chevrolet
14	91	Ryan Vargas	Maples Motorsports	Ford
15	11	Robbie Kennealy	Fast Track Racing	Chevrolet
16	48	Brad Smith	Brad Smith Motorsports	Ford
17	86	Jeff Maconi (R)	Clubb Racing Inc.	Ford
18	89	Bobby Dale Earnhardt	Rise Racing	Chevrolet
19	24	Daniel Dye	SPS Racing	Chevrolet
20	71	Andy Jankowiak	KLAS Motorsports	Chevrolet
21	15	Jade Avedisian	Nitro Motorsports	Toyota
22	17	Monty Tipton	Cook Racing Technologies	Toyota
23	69	Will Kimmel	Kimmel Racing	Ford
24	0	George Siciliano	Rette Jones Racing	Ford
25	30	Garrett Mitchell	Rette Jones Racing	Ford
26	19	Matt Kemp	Maples Motorsports	Chevrolet
27	01	D. L. Wilson	Fast Track Racing	Ford
28	1	Nate Moeller	Maples Motorsports	Chevrolet
29	66	Dystany Spurlock	MBM Motorsports	Ford
Official starting lineup

== Race ==
=== Race results ===
Laps: 108

Fin	St	#	Driver	Team	Make	Laps	Led	Status	Pts
1	2	18	Gio Ruggiero	Joe Gibbs Racing	Toyota	108	50	Running	48
2	19	24	Daniel Dye	SPS Racing	Chevrolet	108	16	Running	43
3	3	20	Jake Bollman (R)	Nitro Motorsports	Toyota	108	0	Running	41
4	5	25	Gavan Boschele (R)	Nitro Motorsports	Toyota	108	3	Running	41
5	4	77	Lanie Buice	Pinnacle Racing Group	Chevrolet	108	0	Running	39
6	7	97	Jason Kitzmiller	CR7 Motorsports	Chevrolet	108	0	Running	38
7	21	15	Jade Avedisian	Nitro Motorsports	Toyota	108	0	Running	37
8	22	17	Monty Tipton	Cook Racing Technologies	Toyota	108	0	Running	36
9	6	70	Thomas Annunziata	Nitro Motorsports	Toyota	108	0	Running	35
10	29	66	Dystany Spurlock	MBM Motorsports	Ford	107	0	Running	34
11	14	91	Ryan Vargas	Maples Motorsports	Ford	106	0	Running	33
12	24	0	George Siciliano	Rette Jones Racing	Ford	106	0	Running	32
13	18	89	Bobby Dale Earnhardt	Rise Racing	Chevrolet	105	0	Running	31
14	26	19	Matt Kemp	Maples Motorsports	Chevrolet	105	0	Running	30
15	10	03	Alex Clubb	Clubb Racing Inc.	Ford	103	0	Running	29
16	11	99	Michael Maples	Maples Motorsports	Chevrolet	103	0	Running	28
17	17	86	Jeff Maconi (R)	Clubb Racing Inc.	Ford	102	0	Running	27
18	1	28	Jack Wood	Pinnacle Racing Group	Chevrolet	101	39	Accident	27
19	9	12	Takuma Koga	Fast Track Racing	Toyota	101	0	Running	25
20	25	30	Garrett Mitchell	Rette Jones Racing	Ford	75	0	Engine	24
21	20	71	Andy Jankowiak	KLAS Motorsports	Toyota	75	0	Accident	23
22	8	55	Isabella Robusto	Nitro Motorsports	Toyota	75	0	Accident	22
23	13	06	Brayton Laster	Wayne Peterson Motorsports	Chevrolet	50	0	Transmission	21
24	27	01	D. L. Wilson	Fast Track Racing	Ford	37	0	Quit	20
25	15	11	Robbie Kennealy	Fast Track Racing	Chevrolet	30	0	Engine	19
26	16	48	Brad Smith	Brad Smith Motorsports	Ford	18	0	Front Bearings	18
27	12	10	Craig Pellegrini Jr.	Fast Track Racing	Toyota	16	0	Vibration	17
28	23	69	Will Kimmel	Kimmel Racing	Ford	6	0	Quit	16
29	28	1	Nate Moeller	Maples Motorsports	Chevrolet	2	0	Quit	15
Official race results

=== Race statistics ===
- Lead changes: 6 among 4 different drivers
- Cautions/Laps: 6 for 33 laps
- Red flags: 0
- Time of race: 1 hour, 40 minutes and 0 seconds
- Average speed: 97.054 miles per hour (156.193 km/h)

== Standings after the race ==
Drivers' Championship standings

	Pos	Driver	Points
	1	Jake Bollman	115
	2	Jason Kitzmiller	103 (–12)
	3	Ryan Vargas	97 (–18)
6	4	Gio Ruggiero	95 (–20)
1	5	Thomas Annunziata	94 (–21)
1	6	Michael Maples	84 (–31)
6	7	Daniel Dye	84 (–31)
3	8	Andy Jankowiak	83 (–32)
5	9	Robbie Kennealy	82 (–33)
1	10	Takuma Koga	74 (–41)

- Note: Only the first 10 positions are included for the driver standings.

Previous race: 2026 General Tire 150	ARCA Menards Series; 2026 season	Next race: 2026 Alabama Manufactured Housing 200
