= Clair Zimmerman =

American racing driver

- Born: June 27, 1956 (age 70); Denver, Pennsylvania, U.S.

ARCA Menards Series career
- 18 races run over 8 years
- Best finish: 47th (2004)
- First race: 2003 GFS Marketplace 200 by Federated Car Care (Toledo)
- Last race: 2016 Berlin ARCA 200 (Berlin)
Wins	Top tens	Poles
0	1	0

ARCA Menards Series East career
- 5 races run over 3 years
- Best finish: 40th (2016)
- First race: 2005 Sylvania 125 Presented by Lowe's (Loudon)
- Last race: 2016 Dover 125 (Dover)
Wins	Top tens	Poles
0	0	0
- Statistics up to date as of November 21, 2024.

Clair Zimmerman (born June 27, 1956) is an American former professional stock car racing driver and who has competed in the NASCAR K&N Pro Series East and the ARCA Racing Series.

Zimmerman has also previously competed in the Super Cup Stock Car Series.

== Motorsports results ==
=== NASCAR ===
(key) (Bold - Pole position awarded by qualifying time. Italics - Pole position earned by points standings or practice time. * – Most laps led.)

==== K&N Pro Series East ====
NASCAR K&N Pro Series East results
Year	Team	No.	Make	1	2	3	4	5	6	7	8	9	10	11	12	13	14	NKNPSEC	Pts	Ref
2005	N/A	97	Chevy	STA	HOL	ERI	NHA	WFD	ADI	STA	DUB	OXF	NHA; 26	DOV; 24	LRP	TMP		49th	176	
2015	Spraker Racing	37	Chevy	NSM	GRE	BRI	IOW	BGS	LGY	COL	NHA	IOW	GLN	MOT	VIR	RCH	DOV; 25	63rd	19	
2016	Logan Yiengst	28	Ford	NSM	MOB	GRE	BRI	VIR	DOM; 20	STA	COL	NHA	IOW	GLN	GRE	NJM	DOV; 16	40th	42	

=== ARCA Racing Series ===
(key) (Bold – Pole position awarded by qualifying time. Italics – Pole position earned by points standings or practice time. * – Most laps led.)

ARCA Racing Series results
Year	Team	No.	Make	1	2	3	4	5	6	7	8	9	10	11	12	13	14	15	16	17	18	19	20	21	22	23	ARSC	Pts	Ref
2003	Bobby Gerhart Racing	7	Chevy	DAY	ATL	NSH	SLM	TOL; 19	KEN	CLT	BLN; 17	KAN	MCH												SBO; 21		56th	540	
2003	Bob Schacht Motorsports	75	Chevy											LER; 19	POC	POC	NSH	ISF	WIN	DSF	CHI	SLM	TAL	CLT			56th	540	
2004	Bobby Gerhart Racing	7	Chevy	DAY	NSH	SLM	KEN	TOL; 15	CLT	KAN	POC	MCH	SBO; 12	BLN	KEN	GTW	POC										47th	615	
2004	Bob Schacht Motorsports	75	Chevy															LER; 17	NSH	ISF							47th	615	
2004	Norm Benning Racing	84	Chevy																		TOL; 17	DSF	CHI	SLM	TAL		47th	615	
2005	Bob Aiello	62	Pontiac	DAY; 38	NSH	SLM	KEN																				70th	400	
2005	Bobby Gerhart Racing	7	Chevy					TOL; 23	LAN	MIL	POC	MCH	KAN	KEN	BLN	POC	GTW	LER; 26	NSH	MCH	ISF	TOL; 19	DSF	CHI	SLM	TAL	70th	400	
2010	Bobby Gerhart Racing	7	Chevy	DAY	PBE	SLM	TEX	TAL	TOL	POC	MCH	IOW	MFD	POC	BLN; 17	NJE	ISF	CHI	DSF	TOL	SLM	KAN	CAR				103rd	145	
2012	Kimmel Racing	69	Ford	DAY	MOB	SLM	TAL	TOL	ELK	POC	MCH	WIN	NJE	IOW	CHI	IRP	POC; 34	BLN	ISF	MAD	SLM	DSF	KAN				145th	60	
2014	Bobby Gerhart Racing	5	Ford	DAY	MOB	SLM	TAL	TOL	NJE	POC	MCH	ELK	WIN	CHI	IRP	POC	BLN; 14	ISF	MAD	DSF	SLM	KEN	KAN				99th	160	
2015	Bobby Gerhart Racing	5	Ford	DAY	MOB	NSH; 18	SLM	TAL	TOL	NJE	POC	MCH	CHI	WIN	IOW	IRP	POC	BLN; 16	ISF	DSF	SLM	KEN	KAN				78th	290	
2016	Rette Jones Racing	30	Ford	DAY	NSH	SLM	TAL	TOL	NJE	POC	MCH	MAD	WIN	IOW	IRP	POC	BLN; 6	ISF	DSF	SLM	CHI	KEN	KAN				95th	200	
