= Dominique Van Wieringen =

Canadian stock car racing driver

- Born: June 22, 1995 (age 31); Amherstburg, Ontario, Canada
- Achievements: Most laps led for a woman in the ARCA Menards Series East (150); First woman to win a JEGS/CRA All-Stars Tour race (2013, Lucas Oil Raceway)

NASCAR FedEx Freight Truck Series career
- 1 race run over 1 year
- 2016 position: 76th
- Best finish: 76th (2016)
- First race: 2016 Lucas Oil 150 (Phoenix)
Wins	Top tens	Poles
0	0	0

ARCA Menards Series career
- 1 race run over 1 year
- Best finish: 85th (2020)
- First race: 2020 Lucas Oil 200 Driven by General Tire (Daytona)

ARCA Menards Series East career
- 15 races run over 2 years
- Best finish: 9th (2016)
- First race: 2016 Pensacola 200 (Pensacola)
- Last race: 2017 Visit Hampton VA 150 (Langley)
Wins	Top tens	Poles
0	6	0
- Statistics up to date as of December 2, 2023.

Dominique Van Wieringen (born June 22, 1995) is a Canadian professional stock car racing driver. She last competed part-time in the ARCA Menards Series, driving the No. 30 Ford Fusion for Rette Jones Racing in 2020. Her younger brother Tristan Van Wieringen is also a racing driver.

== Racing career ==
=== Early career ===
Van Wieringen began racing motocross at the age of five and eventually moved to kart racing. In 2011, she made the transition to full-sized race cars and scored a feature win at Spartan Speedway in Mason, MI. The following season, she won the Outlaw Super Late Model Championship at Springport Motor Speedway. Moving to the JEGS/CRA All-Star Series in 2013, Van Wieringen became the first female to win on the All-Stars Tour on September 22, 2013, at Lucas Oil Raceway.

Van Wieringen signed with NEMCO Motorsports for the 2015 season, running super late models in various CRA Super Series and CARS-Tour events, occasionally as a teammate to John Hunter Nemechek. After modest success, including leading several races and earning a few top-fives, along with some frustrations, Van Wieringen signed with Mark Rette to drive full-time in the K&N Pro Series East for 2016.

=== K&N Pro Series East ===
After signing on with RJR, Van Wieringen would have a less than desirable rookie season, despite qualifying on one of the front two rows for six out of the first eight races and leading at Mobile and Stafford Motor Speedway, Van Wieringen only mustered a best finish of tenth through the first eleven races, however she would go on a hot streak in the final three races reeling off three consecutive top-five finishes to round out the year. She was awarded an honorable mention in the "Breakout Driver" category for her rookie campaign.

In 2017, Van Wieringen returned to Rette Jones Racing for one K&N Pro Series East race, finishing third at Langley Speedway.

=== Camping World Truck Series ===
Following the conclusion of the 2016 NASCAR K&N Pro Series East season, Van Wieringen made her debut in the NASCAR Camping World Truck Series at Phoenix International Raceway for Young's Motorsports in a partnership with Rette Jones, who provided the truck for that race. While running 15th on lap 26, she was shoved into turn 1 by Austin Wayne Self which would force her into Tommy Joe Martins and end her night early, she would finish 31st.

=== ARCA Menards Series ===
Van Wieringen participated in ARCA's Daytona testing in January 2020, and posted the fastest time in one of the sessions. She drove the No. 30 for her former team, Rette Jones Racing. RJR later signed her back to run the race at the track in February of that year. In the race, she was involved in the big one and finished 25th.

=== 2018/2020 ===
In 2018, Van Wieringen would make a return to racing while being an intern engineer for Joe Gibbs Racing in Modified’s at Corrigan Oil Speedway where she would score the pole and lead every lap up until a left front tire blew taking her out for the rest of the night.

In 2019, Van Wieringen would run the full schedule at Springport Motor Speedway, and the Corrigan Oil (Spartan) Speedway, driving for Jon McNett in the No. 7 Duatech Automotive Modified, winning the championship at Springport.

== Personal life ==
Van Wieringen is a Mechanical engineering student at the University of North Carolina at Charlotte. Her younger brother, Tristan, is also a race car driver, and he also drives for the Rette Jones team, running part-time in the ARCA Menards Series East for 2020. Her father, Murray, owns DuroByte Motorsports, a Super Late Model Driver development program, which currently fields the No. 5 Ford Fusion for Michael Clancy.

== Motorsports career results ==
=== NASCAR ===
(key) (Bold – Pole position awarded by qualifying time. Italics – Pole position earned by points standings or practice time. * – Most laps led.)

==== Camping World Truck Series ====
NASCAR Camping World Truck Series results
Year	Team	No.	Make	1	2	3	4	5	6	7	8	9	10	11	12	13	14	15	16	17	18	19	20	21	22	23	NCWTC	Pts	Ref
2016	Young's Motorsports	02	Ford	DAY	ATL	MAR	KAN	DOV	CLT	TEX	IOW	GTW	KEN	ELD	POC	BRI	MCH	MSP	CHI	NHA	LVS	TAL	MAR	TEX	PHO; 31	HOM	76th	2	

==== K&N Pro Series East ====
NASCAR K&N Pro Series East results
Year	Team	No.	Make	1	2	3	4	5	6	7	8	9	10	11	12	13	14	NKNPSEC	Pts	Ref
2016	Rette Jones Racing	30	Ford	NSM; 10	MOB; 20	GRE; 16	BRI; 11	VIR; 18	DOM; 24	STA; 16	COL; 13	NHA; 27	IOW; 10	GLN; 16	GRE; 3	NJM; 5	DOV; 3	9th	429	
2017	Rette Jones Racing	30	Ford	NSM	GRE	BRI	SBO	SBO	MEM	BLN	TMP	NHA	IOW	GLN	LGY; 3	NJM	DOV	41st	41	

=== ARCA Menards Series ===
(key) (Bold – Pole position awarded by qualifying time. Italics – Pole position earned by points standings or practice time. * – Most laps led.)

ARCA Menards Series results
Year	Team	No.	Make	1	2	3	4	5	6	7	8	9	10	11	12	13	14	15	16	17	18	19	20	AMSC	Pts	Ref
2020	Rette Jones Racing	30	Ford	DAY; 25	PHO	TAL	POC	IRP	KEN	IOW	KAN	TOL	TOL	MCH	DAY	GTW	L44	TOL	BRI	WIN	MEM	ISF	KAN	85th	19	

=== CARS Super Late Model Tour ===
(key)

CARS Super Late Model Tour results
Year	Team	No.	Make	1	2	3	4	5	6	7	8	9	10	CSLMTC	Pts	Ref
2015	SWM-NEMCO Motorsports	5V	Chevy	SNM	ROU; 22									19th	106	
2015	SWM-NEMCO Motorsports	5D	Chevy			HCY; 10	SNM	TCM	MMS	ROU; 8	CON; 3	MYB	HCY; 17	19th	106	

^{*} Season still in progress
^{1} Ineligible for series points
