= Terry Jones (racing driver) =

Canadian professional stock car racing driver

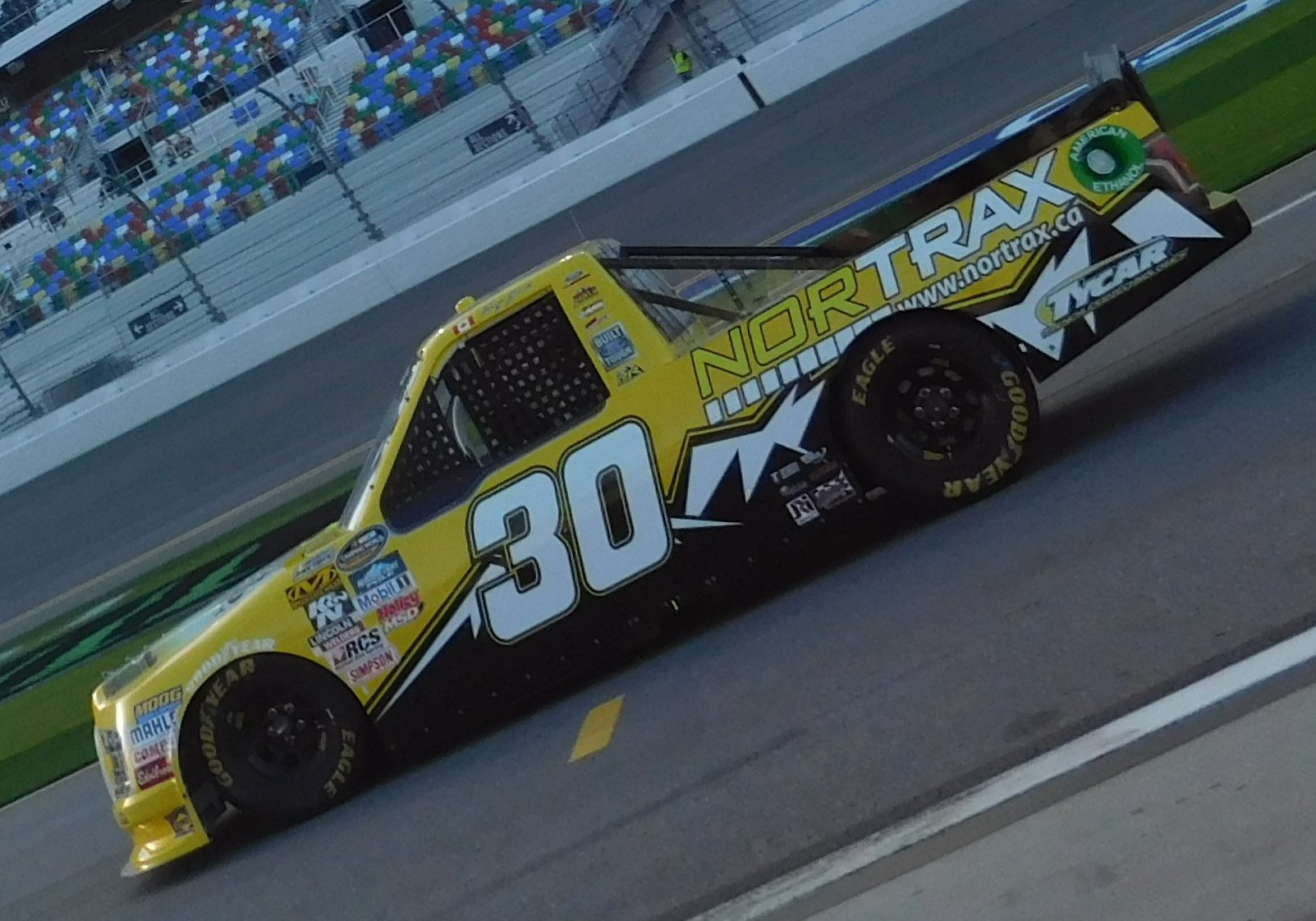
- Jones' truck at Daytona International Speedway in 2017
- Born: July 30, 1971 (age 55); Amherstburg, Ontario, Canada

NASCAR FedEx Freight Truck Series career
- 6 races run over 4 years
- Best finish: 59th (2010)
- First race: 2010 O'Reilly Auto Parts 250 (Kansas)
- Last race: 2017 NextEra Energy Resources 250 (Daytona)
Wins	Top tens	Poles
0	0	0

Terry Jones (born July 30, 1971) is a Canadian businessman and stock car racing team owner. He co-owns Rette Jones Racing, an ARCA Menards Series and ARCA Menards Series West team.

== Career ==
In 1995, Jones formed Jones Group International, an Amherstburg, Ontario-based demolition company. The firm regularly sponsored Jones during his racing career.

Jones began racing in the ARCA Re/Max Series in 2003.

In 2010, Jones joined Team Gill Racing to race in the NASCAR Camping World Truck Series; the move was spurred by Jones' decision to race in NASCAR, a sanctioning body that he considered "a little more professional" than ARCA.

In 2014, Jones signed with Win-Tron Racing for the season opener at Daytona International Speedway. The following year, he partnered with spotter and friend Mark Rette to form Rette Jones Racing; Rette joked in 2019 that while he is the team's "sweat equity", Jones is "the money." Although Jones' racing career was placed on hiatus after a motorcycle accident, he continued his involvement with RJR. Serving as owner-driver, Jones finished 19th in RJR's debut ARCA race at Daytona, where he finished 19th after being involved in a late accident. The team also fielded a Truck program for Chad Finley, with Jones running the Talladega event. In 2016, an attempted return to the Truck Talladega race with Jones was canceled after he suffered a leg injury.

At the 2017 ARCA season opener, Jones recorded a career-best finish of second; he was leading the race until Austin Theriault passed him with eight laps remaining.

== Motorsports career results ==
=== NASCAR ===
(key) (Bold – Pole position awarded by qualifying time. Italics – Pole position earned by points standings or practice time. * – Most laps led.)

==== Camping World Truck Series ====
NASCAR Camping World Truck Series results
Year	Team	No.	Make	1	2	3	4	5	6	7	8	9	10	11	12	13	14	15	16	17	18	19	20	21	22	23	24	25	NCWTC	Pts	Ref
2010	Team Gill Racing	46	Dodge	DAY	ATL	MAR	NSH	KAN; 18	DOV; 27	CLT; 25	TEX																		59th	346	
2010	Team Gill Racing	95	Dodge									MCH; 32	IOW	GTW	IRP	POC	NSH	DAR	BRI	CHI	KEN	NHA	LVS	MAR	TAL	TEX	PHO	HOM	59th	346	
2015	Rette Jones Racing	30	Chevy	DAY	ATL	MAR	KAN	CLT	DOV	TEX	GTW	IOW	KEN	ELD	POC	MCH	BRI	MSP	CHI	NHA	LVS	TAL; 31	MAR	TEX	PHO	HOM			77th	13	
2017	Rette Jones Racing	30	Ford	DAY; 25	ATL	MAR	KAN	CLT	DOV	TEX	GTW	IOW	KEN	ELD	POC	MCH	BRI	MSP	CHI	NHA	LVS	TAL	MAR	TEX	PHO	HOM			69th	12	

=== ARCA Racing Series ===
(key) (Bold – Pole position awarded by qualifying time. Italics – Pole position earned by points standings or practice time. * – Most laps led.)

ARCA Racing Series results
Year	Team	No.	Make	1	2	3	4	5	6	7	8	9	10	11	12	13	14	15	16	17	18	19	20	21	22	23	ARSC	Pts	Ref
2003	Jones Group Racing	30	Ford	DAY	ATL	NSH	SLM	TOL	KEN	CLT	BLN	KAN	MCH	LER	POC	POC	NSH	ISF	WIN; DNQ	DSF	CHI	SLM; 31	TAL	CLT	SBO; 20		118th	205	
2004	Capital City Motorsports	38	Ford	DAY	NSH	SLM; 12	KEN				POC; 16																43rd	685	
2004	Jones Group Racing	30	Ford					TOL; 23	CLT	KAN		MCH; 13	SBO	BLN	KEN	GTW											43rd	685	
2004	Jones Group Racing	30	Dodge														POC; 29	LER	NSH	ISF	TOL	DSF	CHI	SLM	TAL		43rd	685	
2005	Jones Group Racing	30	Dodge	DAY; DNQ	NSH; 27	SLM	KEN; 11	TOL; 25	LAN	MIL	POC	MCH; 14	KAN	KEN	BLN	POC	GTW	LER	NSH	MCH; DNQ	ISF	TOL; 16	DSF	CHI	SLM	TAL	49th	735	
2006	Jones Group Racing	30	Dodge	DAY; DNQ	NSH; DNQ	SLM; 10	WIN	KEN; 36	TOL; 16	POC	MCH; DNQ	KAN	KEN	BLN	POC	GTW	NSH	MCH	ISF	MIL						IOW; 31	49th	760	
2006	Jones Group Racing	7	Dodge																		TOL; 31	DSF	CHI				49th	760	
2006	Jones Group Racing	9	Dodge																					SLM; 15	TAL		49th	760	
2007	Jones Group Racing	30	Dodge	DAY; DNQ	USA	NSH	SLM; 13	KAN	WIN; 6	KEN	TOL; 12	IOW; DNQ	POC; 37	MCH; 26	BLN	KEN; DNQ	POC	NSH	ISF	MIL	GTW	DSF	CHI	SLM	TAL	TOL; 15	36th	905	
2008	Jones Group Racing	30	Dodge	DAY; 35	SLM; 9	IOW	KAN	CAR	KEN	TOL; 24	POC		CAY; 12	KEN	BLN	POC	NSH	ISF	DSF	CHI	SLM; 25	NJE	TAL; 21	TOL; 31			32nd	1180	
2008	Jones Group Racing	8	Dodge									MCH; 25															32nd	1180	
2009	Jones Group Racing	30	Dodge	DAY; 20	SLM	CAR	TAL; 14	KEN	TOL; 31	POC	MCH; 28	MFD	IOW	KEN	BLN	POC	ISF	CHI	TOL; 25	DSF	NJE	SLM; 7	KAN	CAR			38th	755	
2010	Jones Group Racing	30	Dodge	DAY; 21	PBE	SLM; 13	TEX	TAL; 36	TOL; 28	POC	MCH; 37	IOW	MFD	POC	BLN	NJE	ISF	CHI	DSF	TOL	SLM	KAN	CAR				47th	475	
2011	Jones Group Racing	30	Dodge	DAY; 39	TAL; 35	SLM	TOL	NJE	CHI	POC	MCH	WIN	BLN	IOW	IRP	POC	ISF	MAD	DSF	SLM	KAN	TOL					147th	90	
2012	Jones Group Racing	30	Dodge	DAY; 25	MOB	SLM	TAL; 38	TOL; 31	ELK	POC	MCH	WIN	NJE	IOW	CHI	IRP	POC	BLN	ISF	MAD	SLM	DSF	KAN				86th	220	
2013	Jones Group Racing	30	Dodge	DAY; 24	MOB	SLM	TAL; 5	TOL	ELK	POC	MCH	ROA	WIN	CHI	NJE	POC	BLN	ISF	MAD	DSF	IOW	SLM	KEN	KAN			74th	315	
2014	Win-Tron Racing	32	Toyota	DAY; 8	MOB	SLM	TAL; 34	TOL	NJE	POC	MCH	ELK	WIN	CHI	IRP	POC	BLN	ISF	MAD	DSF	SLM	KEN	KAN				64th	255	
2015	Rette Jones Racing	30	Toyota	DAY; 19	MOB	NSH	SLM	TAL; 16	TOL	NJE	POC	MCH	CHI	WIN	IOW	IRP	POC	BLN	ISF	DSF	SLM	KEN	KAN				80th	285	
2016	Rette Jones Racing	30	Toyota	DAY; 40	NSH	SLM	TAL; 28	TOL	NJE	POC	MCH	MAD	WIN	IOW	IRP	POC	BLN	ISF	DSF	SLM	CHI	KEN	KAN				122nd	120	
2017	Rette Jones Racing	30	Toyota	DAY; 2*	NSH	SLM																					67th	280	
2017	Rette Jones Racing	33	Toyota				TAL; 36	TOL	ELK	POC	MCH	MAD	IOW	IRP	POC	WIN	ISF	ROA	DSF	SLM	CHI	KEN	KAN				67th	280	
