= 2026 Henry Ford Health 200 =

ARCA Menards Series race at Michigan International Speedway

Race details
- Race 7 of 20 in the 2026 ARCA Menards Series
- Date: June 5, 2026
- Location: Michigan International Speedway in Brooklyn, Michigan
- Course: Permanent racing facility
- Course length: 2.0 miles (3.2 km)
- Distance: 57 laps, 116 mi (186.68 km)
- Scheduled distance: 100 laps, 200 mi (321.869 km)
- Average speed: 105.420 miles per hour (169.657 km/h)

Pole position
Driver	Garrett Mitchell	Rette Jones Racing
- Time: 38.987

Most laps led
Driver	Connor Mosack	Pinnacle Racing Group
- Laps: 36

Fastest lap
Driver	Lanie Buice	Pinnacle Racing Group
- Time: 39.724

Winner
No. 18	Gio Ruggiero	Joe Gibbs Racing

Television in the United States
- Network: FS2
- Announcers: Brent Stover, Phil Parsons, and Bobby Labonte

Radio in the United States
- Radio: MRN
- Booth announcers: Alex Hayden and Mike Bagley
- Turn announcers: Dave Moody (1–2) and Tim Catalfamo (3–4)

The 2026 Henry Ford Health 200 was an ARCA Menards Series race held on Friday, June 5, 2026, at Michigan International Speedway in Brooklyn, Michigan. Contested over 57 laps—decreased from 100 laps due to inclement weather on the 2-mile (3.219 km) speedway, it was the seventh race of the 2026 ARCA Menards Series season, and the 38th running of the event.

Gio Ruggiero, driving for Joe Gibbs Racing, took over the lead late over Jake Bollman, leading the final 9 laps before the race was called after 57 laps due to rain showers. This was Ruggiero's third career ARCA Menards Series win, and his third of the season. Connor Mosack dominated the majority of the event by leading a race-high 36 laps, before falling back on restart, finishing 4th. Bollman finished second, and Gavan Boschele finished third. Lanie Buice rounded out the top five, while Thomas Annunziata, Isabella Robusto, Will Kimmel, Wesley Slimp, and George Siciliano rounded out the top ten.

== Report ==
=== Background ===
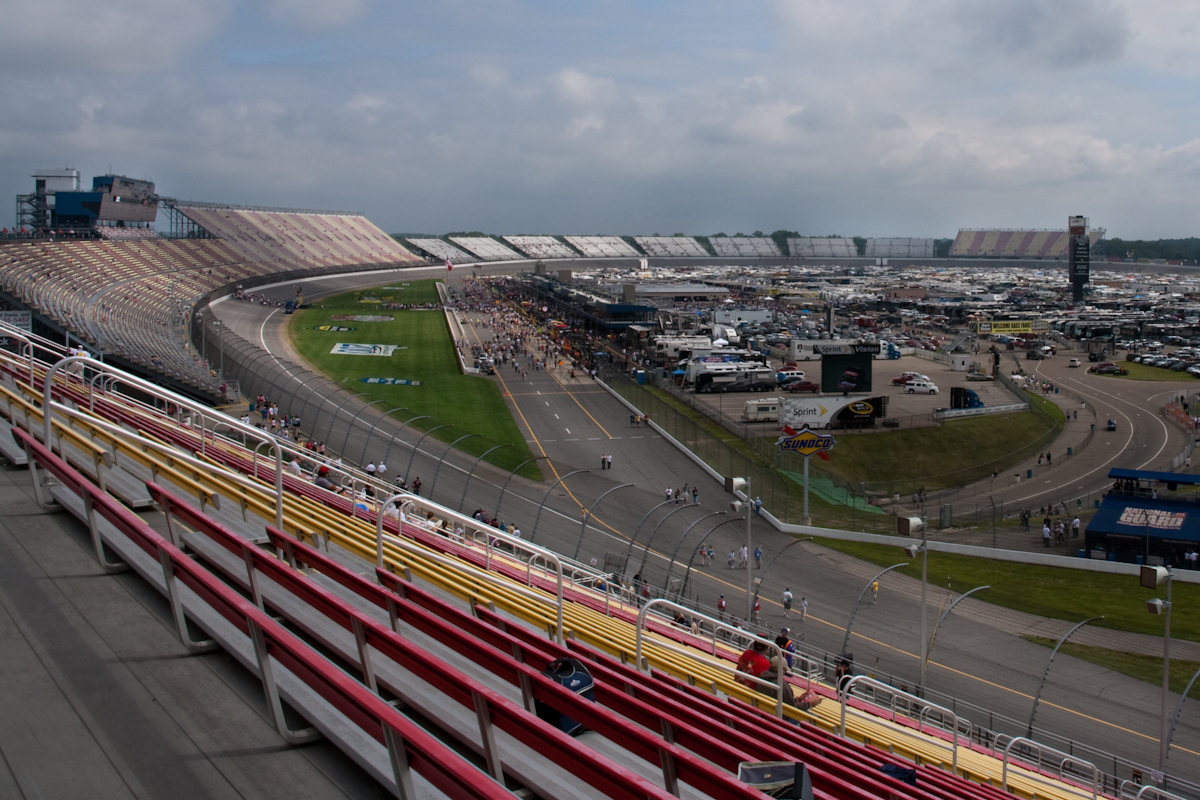
Michigan International Speedway, the track where the race will be held.

The race will be held at Michigan International Speedway, a two-mile (3.2 km) moderate-banked D-shaped speedway located in Brooklyn, Michigan. The track is used primarily for NASCAR events. It is known as a "sister track" to Texas World Speedway as MIS's oval design was a direct basis of TWS, with moderate modifications to the banking in the corners, and was used as the basis of Auto Club Speedway. The track is owned by International Speedway Corporation. Michigan International Speedway is recognized as one of motorsports' premier facilities because of its wide racing surface and high banking (by open-wheel standards; the 18-degree banking is modest by stock car standards).

==== Entry list ====
- (R) denotes rookie driver.

#	Driver	Team	Make
0	George Siciliano	Rette Jones Racing	Ford
2	Kyle Steckly	RAFA Racing Team	Toyota
03	Alex Clubb	Clubb Racing Inc.	Ford
06	Con Nicolopoulos	Wayne Peterson Motorsports	Chevrolet
10	Dustin Hillenburg	Fast Track Racing	Ford
11	Matt Kemp	Fast Track Racing	Chevrolet
12	Takuma Koga	Fast Track Racing	Toyota
15	Wesley Slimp	Nitro Motorsports	Toyota
18	Gio Ruggiero	Joe Gibbs Racing	Toyota
19	Morgen Baird	Maples Motorsports	Chevrolet
20	Jake Bollman (R)	Nitro Motorsports	Toyota
22	Nick White	White Motorsports	Chevrolet
24	Daniel Dye	SPS Racing	Chevrolet
25	Gavan Boschele (R)	Nitro Motorsports	Toyota
28	Connor Mosack	Pinnacle Racing Group	Chevrolet
30	Garrett Mitchell	Rette Jones Racing	Ford
32	Charles Weslowski Jr.	Weslowski Racing	Chevrolet
48	Brad Smith	Brad Smith Motorsports	Ford
55	Isabella Robusto	Nitro Motorsports	Toyota
65	Jeffery MacZink	MacZink Racing	Toyota
66	Dystany Spurlock	MBM Motorsports	Chevrolet
69	Will Kimmel	Kimmel Racing	Ford
70	Thomas Annunziata	Nitro Motorsports	Toyota
71	Andy Jankowiak	KLAS Motorsports	Toyota
77	Lanie Buice	Pinnacle Racing Group	Chevrolet
86	Jeff Maconi (R)	Clubb Racing Inc.	Ford
89	Bobby Dale Earnhardt	Rise Racing	Chevrolet
91	Ryan Vargas	Maples Motorsports	Ford
97	Jason Kitzmiller	CR7 Motorsports	Chevrolet
99	Michael Maples	Maples Motorsports	Chevrolet
Official entry list

== Practice ==
The first and only practice session was held on Friday, June 5, at 2:00 PM EST, and lasted for 1 hour.

Lanie Buice, driving for Pinnacle Racing Group, set the fastest time in the session, with a lap of 39.110 seconds, and a speed of 184.096 miles per hour (296.274 km/h).

=== Practice results ===
Pos.	#	Driver	Team	Make	Time	Speed
1	77	Lanie Buice	Pinnacle Racing Group	Chevrolet	39.110	184.096
2	25	Gavan Boschele (R)	Nitro Motorsports	Toyota	39.217	183.594
3	18	Gio Ruggiero	Joe Gibbs Racing	Toyota	39.289	183.257
Full practice results

== Qualifying ==
Qualifying was held on Friday, June 5, at 3:15 PM EST. The qualifying procedure used was a multi-car, multi-lap based system. All drivers were on track for a 20-minute timed session, and whoever set the fastest time in that session won the pole.

Garrett Mitchell, driving for Rette Jones Racing, qualified on pole position with a lap of 38.987 seconds, and a speed of 184.677 miles per hour (297.209 km/h).

=== Qualifying results ===
Pos.	#	Driver	Team	Make	Time	Speed
1	30	Garrett Mitchell	Rette Jones Racing	Ford	38.987	184.677
2	20	Jake Bollman (R)	Nitro Motorsports	Toyota	39.012	184.559
3	77	Lanie Buice	Pinnacle Racing Group	Chevrolet	39.078	184.247
4	28	Connor Mosack	Pinnacle Racing Group	Chevrolet	39.259	183.397
5	18	Gio Ruggiero	Joe Gibbs Racing	Toyota	39.326	183.085
6	25	Gavan Boschele (R)	Nitro Motorsports	Toyota	39.458	182.473
7	69	Will Kimmel	Kimmel Racing	Ford	39.527	182.154
8	71	Andy Jankowiak	KLAS Motorsports	Toyota	39.576	181.928
9	15	Wesley Slimp	Nitro Motorsports	Toyota	39.663	181.529
10	91	Ryan Vargas	Maples Motorsports	Ford	39.698	181.369
11	89	Bobby Dale Earnhardt	Rise Racing	Chevrolet	40.220	179.015
12	70	Thomas Annunziata	Nitro Motorsports	Toyota	41.131	175.050
13	65	Jeffery MacZink	MacZink Racing	Toyota	41.630	172.952
14	11	Matt Kemp	Fast Track Racing	Chevrolet	41.680	172.745
15	19	Morgen Baird	Maples Motorsports	Chevrolet	41.837	172.096
16	22	Nick White	White Motorsports	Chevrolet	41.890	171.879
17	12	Takuma Koga	Fast Track Racing	Toyota	42.621	168.931
18	99	Michael Maples	Maples Motorsports	Chevrolet	42.787	168.275
19	10	Dustin Hillenburg	Fast Track Racing	Ford	44.775	160.804
20	03	Alex Clubb	Clubb Racing Inc.	Ford	45.344	158.786
21	86	Jeff Maconi (R)	Clubb Racing Inc.	Ford	46.331	155.404
22	06	Con Nicolopoulos	Wayne Peterson Motorsports	Chevrolet	47.085	152.912
23	48	Brad Smith	Brad Smith Motorsports	Ford	53.983	133.375
24	97	Jason Kitzmiller	CR7 Motorsports	Chevrolet	—	—
25	55	Isabella Robusto	Nitro Motorsports	Toyota	—	—
26	24	Daniel Dye	SPS Racing	Chevrolet	—	—
27	0	George Siciliano	Rette Jones Racing	Ford	—	—
28	66	Dystany Spurlock	MBM Motorsports	Chevrolet	—	—
29	2	Kyle Steckly	RAFA Racing Team	Toyota	—	—
30	32	Charles Weslowski Jr.	Weslowski Racing	Chevrolet	—	—
Official qualifying results

== Race ==
=== Race results ===
Laps: 57

Fin	St	#	Driver	Team	Make	Laps	Led	Status	Pts
1	5	18	Gio Ruggiero	Joe Gibbs Racing	Toyota	57	9	Running	47
2	2	20	Jake Bollman (R)	Nitro Motorsports	Toyota	57	6	Running	43
3	6	25	Gavan Boschele (R)	Nitro Motorsports	Toyota	57	0	Running	41
4	4	28	Connor Mosack	Pinnacle Racing Group	Chevrolet	57	36	Running	42
5	3	77	Lanie Buice	Pinnacle Racing Group	Chevrolet	57	0	Running	39
6	12	70	Thomas Annunziata	Nitro Motorsports	Toyota	57	0	Running	38
7	25	55	Isabella Robusto	Nitro Motorsports	Toyota	57	0	Running	37
8	7	69	Will Kimmel	Kimmel Racing	Ford	57	0	Running	36
9	9	15	Wesley Slimp	Nitro Motorsports	Toyota	57	0	Running	35
10	28	0	George Siciliano	Rette Jones Racing	Ford	57	0	Running	34
11	29	2	Kyle Steckly	RAFA Racing Team	Toyota	57	0	Running	33
12	10	91	Ryan Vargas	Maples Motorsports	Ford	57	0	Running	32
13	27	66	Dystany Spurlock	MBM Motorsports	Chevrolet	57	0	Running	31
14	1	30	Garrett Mitchell	Rette Jones Racing	Ford	57	6	Running	32
15	8	71	Andy Jankowiak	KLAS Motorsports	Toyota	56	0	Running	29
16	18	99	Michael Maples	Maples Motorsports	Chevrolet	55	0	Running	28
17	13	65	Jeffery MacZink	MacZink Racing	Toyota	55	0	Running	27
18	17	12	Takuma Koga	Fast Track Racing	Toyota	54	0	Running	26
19	26	24	Daniel Dye	SPS Racing	Chevrolet	54	0	Mechanical	25
20	22	06	Con Nicolopoulos	Wayne Peterson Motorsports	Chevrolet	53	0	Running	24
21	20	03	Alex Clubb	Clubb Racing Inc.	Ford	53	0	Running	23
22	15	19	Morgen Baird	Maples Motorsports	Chevrolet	51	0	Running	22
23	24	97	Jason Kitzmiller	CR7 Motorsports	Chevrolet	49	0	Accident	21
24	21	86	Jeff Maconi (R)	Clubb Racing Inc.	Ford	47	0	Running	20
25	11	89	Bobby Dale Earnhardt	Rise Racing	Chevrolet	46	0	Mechanical	19
26	14	11	Matt Kemp	Fast Track Racing	Chevrolet	21	0	Mechanical	18
27	19	10	Dustin Hillenburg	Fast Track Racing	Ford	11	0	Mechanical	17
28	16	22	Nick White	White Motorsports	Chevrolet	9	0	Mechanical	16
29	23	48	Brad Smith	Brad Smith Motorsports	Ford	0	0	Mechanical	15
30	30	32	Charles Weslowski Jr.	Weslowski Racing	Chevrolet	0	0	Did Not Start	14
Official race results

=== Race statistics ===
- Lead changes: 3 among 4 different drivers
- Cautions/Laps: 4 for 23 laps
- Red flags: 1
- Time of race: 1 hour, 4 minutes and 5 seconds
- Average speed: 105.420 miles per hour (169.657 km/h)

== Standings after the race ==
Drivers' Championship standings

	Pos	Driver	Points
	1	Jake Bollman	308
1	2	Thomas Annunziata	283 (–25)
1	3	Ryan Vargas	280 (–28)
	4	Andy Jankowiak	263 (–45)
1	5	Isabella Robusto	257 (–51)
1	6	Jason Kitzmiller	243 (–65)
	7	Takuma Koga	232 (–76)
	8	Michael Maples	223 (–85)
	9	Bobby Dale Earnhardt	200 (–108)
	10	Alex Clubb	195 (–113)

- Note: Only the first 10 positions are included for the driver standings.

Previous race: 2026 Owens Corning 200	ARCA Menards Series; 2026 season	Next race: 2026 Sunset Hill Shooting Range 150
