= 2026 Rockingham ARCA Menards Series East 125 =

ARCA Menards Series East race at Rockingham Speedway

Race details
- Race 2 of 8 in the 2026 ARCA Menards Series East
- Date: April 4, 2026
- Location: Rockingham Speedway in Rockingham, North Carolina
- Course: Permanent racing facility
- Course length: 0.940 miles (1.513 km)
- Distance: 125 laps, 125 mi (201 km)
- Average speed: 94.063 miles per hour (151.380 km/h)

Pole position
Driver	Tristan McKee	Pinnacle Racing Group
- Time: 22.459

Most laps led
Driver	Tristan McKee	Pinnacle Racing Group
- Laps: 125

Fastest lap
Driver	Tristan McKee	Pinnacle Racing Group
- Time: 23.212

Winner
No. 77	Tristan McKee	Pinnacle Racing Group

Television in the United States
- Network: FloRacing; NASCAR Channel
- Announcers: Charles Krall and Justin Allgaier

Radio in the United States
- Radio: MRN
- Booth announcers: Alex Hayden and Kyle Rickey
- Turn announcers: Tim Catafalmo (1 & 2) and Nathan Prowdi (3 & 4)

The 2026 Rockingham ARCA Menards Series East 125 was an ARCA Menards Series East race held on Saturday, April 4, 2026, at Rockingham Speedway in Rockingham, North Carolina. Contested over 125 laps on the 0.940-mile (1.513 km) asphalt speedway, it was the second race of the 2026 ARCA Menards Series East season, and the second running of the event.

Tristan McKee, driving for Pinnacle Racing Group, pulled off a dominating performance, leading every lap from the pole position and holding off the field on a late restart to earn his second career ARCA Menards Series East win, and his second consecutive win. Carson Brown finished second, and Isaac Kitzmiller finished third. Garrett Mitchell and Wesley Slimp rounded out the top five, while Jackson McLerran, Cory Roper, Max Reaves, George Siciliano, and Craig Pellegrini Jr. rounded out the top ten.

== Report ==
=== Background ===
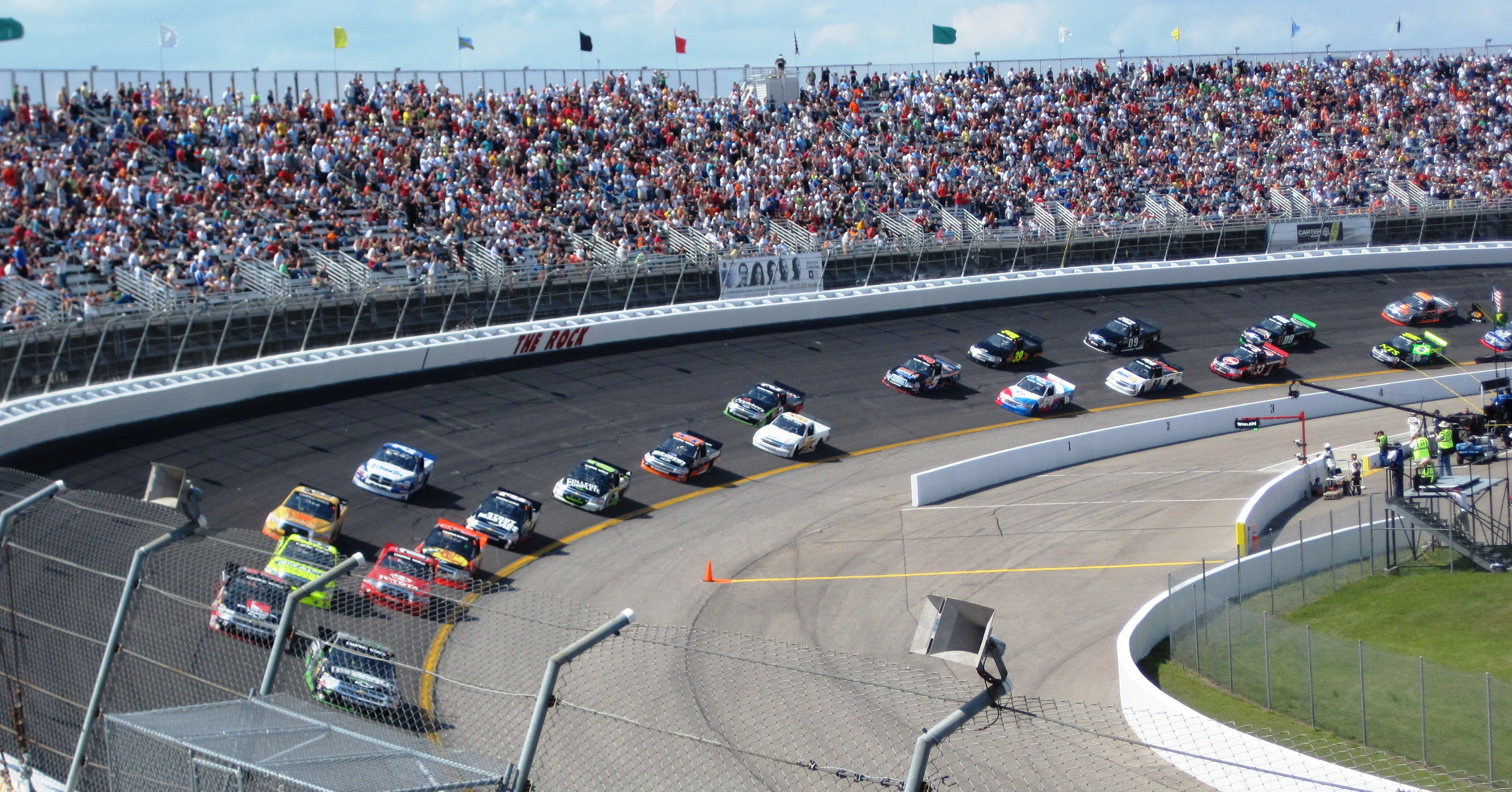
Rockingham Speedway, the track where the race will be held.

Rockingham Speedway and Entertainment Complex (formerly known as North Carolina Speedway from 1998 to 2007 and North Carolina Motor Speedway from 1965 to 1996) is a 0.94 mi (1.51 km) D-shaped oval track in Rockingham, North Carolina. The track has held a variety of events since its opening in 1965, including the NASCAR Cup Series from 1965 to 2004, and currently the NASCAR O'Reilly Auto Parts Series, NASCAR Craftsman Truck Series, and the ARCA Menards Series East. It has a 32,000-seat capacity as of 2012. Rockingham Speedway is owned by the International Hot Rod Association (IHRA).

==== Entry list ====
- (R) denotes rookie driver.

#	Driver	Team	Make
00	Toby Blanton	Jet Daddy Racing	Chevrolet
0	George Siciliano	Rette Jones Racing	Ford
06	Nate Moeller	Wayne Peterson Motorsports	Toyota
10	Craig Pellegrini Jr. (R)	Fast Track Racing	Toyota
11	Mike Basham	Fast Track Racing	Ford
12	Dustin Hillenburg	Fast Track Racing	Ford
13	Brian Weber	Integrity Autosports	Toyota
17	Cory Roper	Cook Racing Technologies	Chevrolet
18	Max Reaves (R)	Joe Gibbs Racing	Toyota
19	Austin Vaughn	Maples Motorsports	Ford
24	Connor Hall	SPS Racing	Chevrolet
25	Gavan Boschele	Nitro Motorsports	Toyota
28	Carson Brown (R)	Pinnacle Racing Group	Chevrolet
30	Garrett Mitchell	Rette Jones Racing	Ford
34	T. J. Harris	WAV Racing	Toyota
66	Dystany Spurlock	MBM Motorsports	Chevrolet
70	Wesley Slimp	Nitro Motorsports	Toyota
77	Tristan McKee (R)	Pinnacle Racing Group	Chevrolet
79	Isaac Kitzmiller	ACR Motorsports	Chevrolet
85	Quinn Davis (R)	City Garage Motorsports	Ford
95	Jackson McLerran	MAN Motorsports	Toyota
99	Michael Maples	Maples Motorsports	Chevrolet
Official entry list

== Practice ==
The first and only practice session was held on Saturday, April 4, at 9:00 AM EST, and lasted for 50 minutes.

Tristan McKee, driving for Pinnacle Racing Group, set the fastest time in the session, with a lap of 22.617 seconds, and a speed of 154.397 miles per hour (248.478 km/h).

=== Practice results ===
Pos.	#	Driver	Team	Make	Time	Speed
1	77	Tristan McKee (R)	Pinnacle Racing Group	Chevrolet	22.617	154.397
2	28	Carson Brown (R)	Pinnacle Racing Group	Chevrolet	22.668	154.050
3	18	Max Reaves (R)	Joe Gibbs Racing	Toyota	22.826	152.983
Full practice results

== Qualifying ==
Qualifying was held on Saturday, April 4, at 10:05 AM EST. The qualifying procedure used was a multi-car, multi-lap system with one round. All drivers were on track for a 20-minute timed session, and whoever set the fastest time in the session won the pole.

Tristan McKee, driving for Pinnacle Racing Group, qualified on pole position with a lap of 22.459 seconds, and a speed of 155.483 miles per hour (250.226 km/h).

=== Qualifying results ===
Pos.	#	Driver	Team	Make	Time	Speed
1	77	Tristan McKee (R)	Pinnacle Racing Group	Chevrolet	22.459	155.483
2	18	Max Reaves (R)	Joe Gibbs Racing	Toyota	22.635	154.274
3	28	Carson Brown (R)	Pinnacle Racing Group	Chevrolet	22.702	153.819
4	25	Gavan Boschele	Nitro Motorsports	Toyota	22.834	152.930
5	24	Connor Hall	SPS Racing	Chevrolet	22.886	152.582
6	79	Isaac Kitzmiller	ACR Motorsports	Chevrolet	22.981	151.952
7	30	Garrett Mitchell	Rette Jones Racing	Ford	23.124	151.012
8	70	Wesley Slimp	Nitro Motorsports	Toyota	23.306	149.833
9	85	Quinn Davis (R)	City Garage Motorsports	Ford	23.554	148.255
10	17	Cory Roper	Cook Racing Technologies	Chevrolet	23.563	148.198
11	0	George Siciliano	Rette Jones Racing	Ford	23.693	147.385
12	95	Jackson McLerran	MAN Motorsports	Toyota	23.870	146.292
13	66	Dystany Spurlock	MBM Motorsports	Chevrolet	24.503	142.513
14	19	Austin Vaughn	Maples Motorsports	Ford	24.897	140.258
15	34	T. J. Harris	WAV Racing	Toyota	25.872	134.972
16	13	Brian Weber	Integrity Autosports	Toyota	25.960	134.515
17	10	Craig Pellegrini Jr. (R)	Fast Track Racing	Toyota	26.252	133.018
18	12	Dustin Hillenburg	Fast Track Racing	Ford	26.615	131.204
19	11	Mike Basham	Fast Track Racing	Ford	27.862	125.332
20	06	Nate Moeller	Wayne Peterson Motorsports	Toyota	27.974	124.830
21	99	Michael Maples	Maples Motorsports	Chevrolet	28.807	121.221
22	00	Toby Blanton	Jet Daddy Racing	Chevrolet	30.060	116.168
Official qualifying results

== Race ==
=== Race results ===
Laps: 125

Fin	St	#	Driver	Team	Make	Laps	Led	Status	Pts
1	1	77	Tristan McKee (R)	Pinnacle Racing Group	Chevrolet	125	125	Running	49
2	3	28	Carson Brown (R)	Pinnacle Racing Group	Chevrolet	125	0	Running	42
3	6	79	Isaac Kitzmiller	ACR Motorsports	Chevrolet	125	0	Running	41
4	7	30	Garrett Mitchell	Rette Jones Racing	Ford	125	0	Running	40
5	8	70	Wesley Slimp	Nitro Motorsports	Toyota	125	0	Running	39
6	12	95	Jackson McLerran	MAN Motorsports	Toyota	125	0	Running	38
7	10	17	Cory Roper	Cook Racing Technologies	Chevrolet	125	0	Running	37
8	2	18	Max Reaves (R)	Joe Gibbs Racing	Toyota	123	0	Running	36
9	11	0	George Siciliano	Rette Jones Racing	Ford	122	0	Running	35
10	17	10	Craig Pellegrini Jr. (R)	Fast Track Racing	Toyota	121	0	Running	34
11	16	13	Brian Weber	Integrity Autosports	Toyota	117	0	Running	33
12	13	66	Dystany Spurlock	MBM Motorsports	Chevrolet	116	0	Running	32
13	15	34	T. J. Harris	WAV Racing	Toyota	114	0	Running	31
14	14	19	Austin Vaughn	Maples Motorsports	Ford	114	0	Running	30
15	18	12	Dustin Hillenburg	Fast Track Racing	Ford	112	0	Running	29
16	20	06	Nate Moeller	Wayne Peterson Motorsports	Toyota	111	0	Running	28
17	5	24	Connor Hall	SPS Racing	Chevrolet	110	0	Accident	27
18	22	00	Toby Blanton	Jet Daddy Racing	Chevrolet	103	0	Mechanical	26
19	21	99	Michael Maples	Maples Motorsports	Chevrolet	99	0	Accident	25
20	4	25	Gavan Boschele	Nitro Motorsports	Toyota	45	0	Accident	24
21	9	85	Quinn Davis (R)	City Garage Motorsports	Ford	13	0	Mechanical	23
22	19	11	Mike Basham	Fast Track Racing	Ford	3	0	Mechanical	22
Official race results

=== Race statistics ===
- Lead changes: 1 among 1 different driver
- Cautions/Laps: 5 for 28 laps
- Red flags: 0
- Time of race: 1 hour, 14 minutes and 5 seconds
- Average speed: 94.063 miles per hour (151.380 km/h)

== Standings after the race ==
Drivers' Championship standings

	Pos	Driver	Points
	1	Tristan McKee	96
1	2	Isaac Kitzmiller	82 (–14)
1	3	Max Reaves	81 (–15)
4	4	Jackson McLerran	74 (–22)
2	5	Dystany Spurlock	69 (–27)
3	6	Craig Pellegrini Jr.	69 (–27)
6	7	George Siciliano	66 (–30)
2	8	Austin Vaughn	64 (–32)
5	9	Nate Moeller	58 (–38)
10	10	Brian Weber	57 (–39)

- Note: Only the first 10 positions are included for the driver standings.

Previous race: 2026 Cook Out 200	ARCA Menards Series East; 2026 season	Next race: 2026 Music City 150
