= Ford Fusion =

The Ford Fusion is an automobile nameplate by Ford.

- Ford Fusion (Americas), mid-size car produced between the 2006 and 2020 model years
  - Ford Fusion Hybrid, gasoline-electric hybrid powered version
  - Ford Fusion Energi, plug-in hybrid version
- Ford Fusion (Europe), mini MPV produced from 2002 to 2012 and sold in Europe
