= 2026 Owens Corning 200 =

ARCA Menards Series and ARCA Menards Series East combination race at Toledo Speedway

Race details
- Race 6 of 20 in the 2026 ARCA Menards Series; Race 4 of 8 in the 2026 ARCA Menards Series East
- Date: May 16, 2026
- Location: Toledo Speedway in Toledo, Ohio
- Course: Permanent racing facility
- Course length: 0.500 miles (0.804 km)
- Distance: 200 laps, 100 mi (160.934 km)
- Average speed: 61.824 miles per hour (99.496 km/h)

Pole position
Driver	Max Reaves	Joe Gibbs Racing
- Time: 16.139

Most laps led
Driver	Tristan McKee	Pinnacle Racing Group
- Laps: 194

Fastest lap
Driver	Tristan McKee	Pinnacle Racing Group
- Time: 16.588

Winner
No. 77	Tristan McKee	Pinnacle Racing Group

Television in the United States
- Network: FS1
- Announcers: Eric Brennan and Phil Parsons

Radio in the United States
- Radio: ARN

The 2026 Owens Corning 200 was an ARCA Menards Series and ARCA Menards Series East combination race held on Saturday, May 16, 2026, at Toledo Speedway in Toledo, Ohio. Contested over 200 laps on the 0.500-mile (0.805 km) short track, it was the sixth race of the 2026 ARCA Menards Series season, the fourth race of the 2026 ARCA Menards Series East season, and the 5th running of the event.

In an action-packed race, Tristan McKee, driving for Pinnacle Racing Group, pulled off a dominating performance, leading all but six laps after numerous issues occurred with pole-sitter Max Reaves, including a spin early in the event. This was McKee's second career ARCA Menards Series win, his first of the season, and his third career ARCA Menards Series East win. Thomas Annunziata finished second, and Carson Brown finished third. Jake Bollman and Caden Kvapil rounded out the top five, while Isabella Robusto, Jason Kitzmiller, Wesley Slimp, Ryan Vargas, and Craig Pellegrini Jr. rounded out the top ten.

== Report ==
=== Background ===
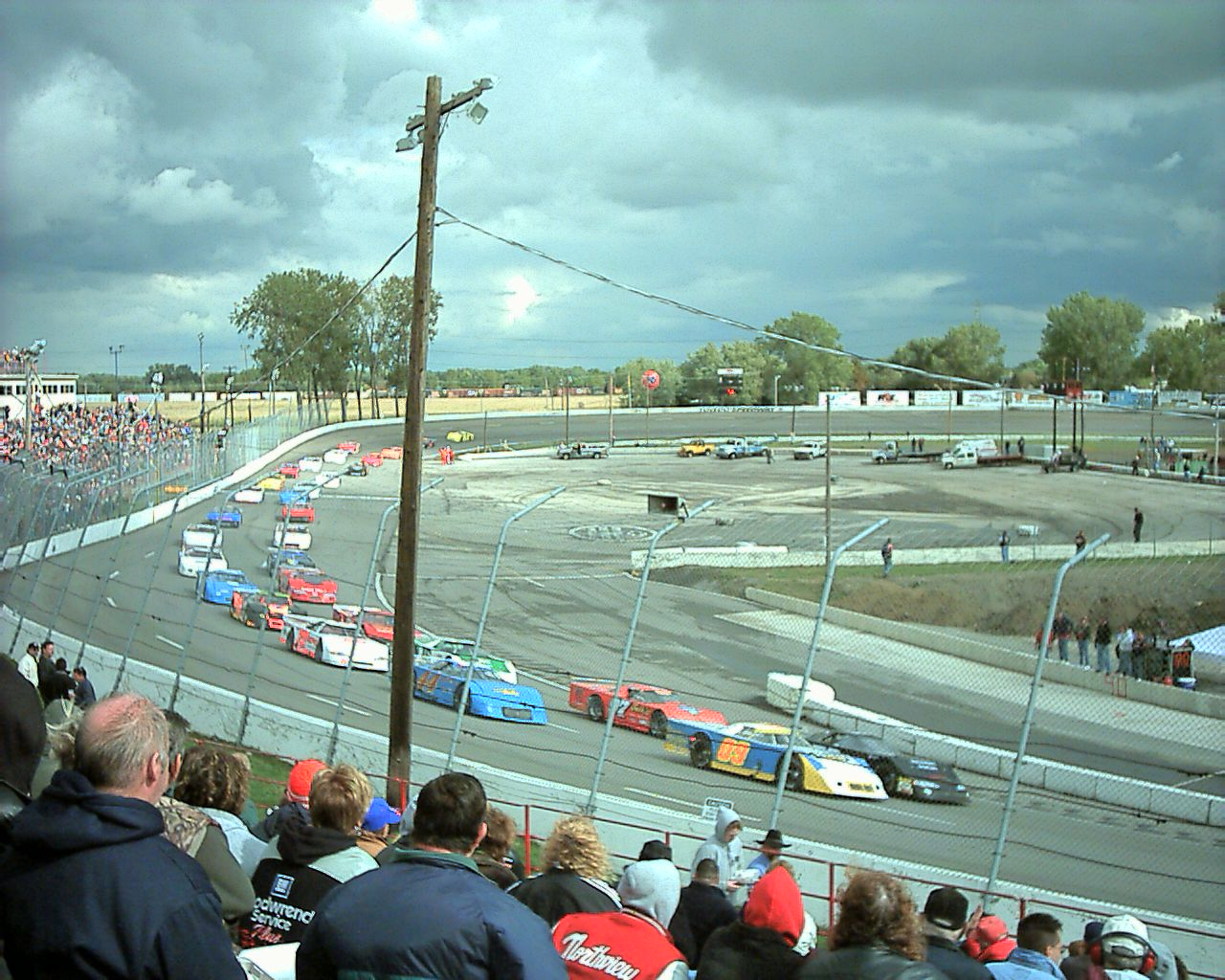
Toledo Speedway, the track where the race was held.

Toledo Speedway is a half-mile paved oval racetrack located in Toledo, Ohio, United States. It is owned jointly by Roy Mott and NASCAR. It is operated by NASCAR and run as the sister track to Flat Rock Speedway in Flat Rock, Michigan.

Toledo was one of the oldest tracks to still host an ARCA Menards Series race until 2019. Starting in 2020, after NASCAR bought ARCA, the race became part of the rebranded ARCA Menards Series East (former NASCAR K&N Pro Series East). However, due to COVID-19 related scheduling changes, the track ended up hosting three ARCA races in 2020, and returned on the national schedule in 2021.

==== Entry list ====
- (R) denotes rookie driver.

#	Driver	Team	Make
1	Kenna Long	Maples Motorsports	Chevrolet
03	Alex Clubb	Clubb Racing Inc.	Ford
06	Nate Moeller	Wayne Peterson Motorsports	Toyota
10	Craig Pellegrini Jr. (R)	Fast Track Racing	Toyota
11	Matt Kemp	Fast Track Racing	Ford
12	Takuma Koga	Fast Track Racing	Toyota
13	Rita Goulet	Integrity Autosports	Toyota
18	Max Reaves (R)	Joe Gibbs Racing	Toyota
19	Austin Vaughn	Maples Motorsports	Ford
20	Jake Bollman (R)	Nitro Motorsports	Toyota
24	Caden Kvapil	SPS Racing	Chevrolet
25	Wesley Slimp	Nitro Motorsports	Toyota
28	Carson Brown (R)	Pinnacle Racing Group	Chevrolet
34	Brian Barbarow	VWV Racing	Toyota
48	Brad Smith	Brad Smith Motorsports	Ford
55	Isabella Robusto	Nitro Motorsports	Toyota
70	Thomas Annunziata	Nitro Motorsports	Toyota
71	Andy Jankowiak	KLAS Motorsports	Chevrolet
77	Tristan McKee (R)	Pinnacle Racing Group	Chevrolet
79	Isaac Kitzmiller	ACR Motorsports	Chevrolet
85	Quinn Davis (R)	City Garage Motorsports	Ford
86	Jeff Maconi (R)	Clubb Racing Inc.	Ford
89	Bobby Dale Earnhardt	Rise Racing	Chevrolet
91	Ryan Vargas	Maples Motorsports	Chevrolet
95	Jackson McLerran	MAN Motorsports	Toyota
97	Jason Kitzmiller	CR7 Motorsports	Chevrolet
98	Dale Shearer	Shearer Speed Racing	Toyota
99	Michael Maples	Maples Motorsports	Chevrolet
Official entry list

== Practice ==
The first and only practice session was held on Saturday, May 16, at 3:00 PM EST, and lasted for 45 minutes.

Max Reaves, driving for Joe Gibbs Racing, set the fastest time in the session, with a lap of 16.271 seconds, and a speed of 110.626 miles per hour (178.035 km/h).

=== Practice results ===
Pos.	#	Driver	Team	Make	Time	Speed
1	18	Max Reaves (R)	Joe Gibbs Racing	Toyota	16.271	110.626
2	77	Tristan McKee (R)	Pinnacle Racing Group	Chevrolet	16.288	110.511
3	79	Isaac Kitzmiller	ACR Motorsports	Chevrolet	16.690	107.849
Full practice results

== Qualifying ==
Qualifying was held on Saturday, May 16, at 4:30 PM EST. The qualifying procedure used was a single-car, two-lap based system. Drivers were on track by themselves and had two laps to post a qualifying time, and whoever set the fastest time won the pole.

Max Reaves, driving for Joe Gibbs Racing, qualified on pole position with a lap of 16.139 seconds, and a speed of 111.531 miles per hour (179.492 km/h).

=== Qualifying results ===
Pos.	#	Driver	Team	Make	Time	Speed
1	18	Max Reaves (R)	Joe Gibbs Racing	Toyota	16.139	111.531
2	77	Tristan McKee (R)	Pinnacle Racing Group	Chevrolet	16.142	111.510
3	28	Carson Brown (R)	Pinnacle Racing Group	Chevrolet	16.269	110.640
4	20	Jake Bollman (R)	Nitro Motorsports	Toyota	16.336	110.186
5	70	Thomas Annunziata	Nitro Motorsports	Toyota	16.425	109.589
6	71	Andy Jankowiak	KLAS Motorsports	Chevrolet	16.520	108.959
7	25	Wesley Slimp	Nitro Motorsports	Toyota	16.520	108.959
8	79	Isaac Kitzmiller	ACR Motorsports	Chevrolet	16.538	108.840
9	24	Caden Kvapil	SPS Racing	Chevrolet	16.538	108.840
10	95	Jackson McLerran	MAN Motorsports	Toyota	16.553	108.742
11	97	Jason Kitzmiller	CR7 Motorsports	Chevrolet	16.681	107.907
12	91	Ryan Vargas	Maples Motorsports	Chevrolet	16.692	107.836
13	12	Takuma Koga	Fast Track Racing	Toyota	16.961	106.126
14	85	Quinn Davis (R)	City Garage Motorsports	Ford	17.051	105.566
15	10	Craig Pellegrini Jr. (R)	Fast Track Racing	Toyota	17.150	104.956
16	11	Matt Kemp	Fast Track Racing	Ford	17.241	104.402
17	03	Alex Clubb	Clubb Racing Inc.	Ford	17.387	103.526
18	99	Michael Maples	Maples Motorsports	Chevrolet	17.502	102.845
19	19	Austin Vaughn	Maples Motorsports	Ford	17.508	102.810
20	86	Jeff Maconi (R)	Clubb Racing Inc.	Ford	18.100	99.448
21	48	Brad Smith	Brad Smith Motorsports	Ford	18.122	99.327
22	13	Rita Goulet	Integrity Autosports	Toyota	18.123	99.321
23	89	Bobby Dale Earnhardt	Rise Racing	Chevrolet	18.169	99.070
24	06	Nate Moeller	Wayne Peterson Motorsports	Toyota	18.384	97.911
25	98	Dale Shearer	Shearer Speed Racing	Toyota	18.597	96.790
26	34	Brian Barbarow	VWV Racing	Toyota	18.661	96.458
27	1	Kenna Long	Maples Motorsports	Chevrolet	18.717	96.169
28	55	Isabella Robusto	Nitro Motorsports	Toyota	—	—
Official qualifying results

== Race ==
=== Race results ===
Laps: 200

Fin	St	#	Driver	Team	Make	Laps	Led	Status	Pts
1	2	77	Tristan McKee (R)	Pinnacle Racing Group	Chevrolet	200	194	Running	48
2	5	70	Thomas Annunziata	Nitro Motorsports	Toyota	200	0	Running	42
3	3	28	Carson Brown (R)	Pinnacle Racing Group	Chevrolet	200	0	Running	41
4	4	20	Jake Bollman (R)	Nitro Motorsports	Toyota	200	0	Running	40
5	9	24	Caden Kvapil	SPS Racing	Chevrolet	200	0	Running	39
6	28	55	Isabella Robusto	Nitro Motorsports	Toyota	200	0	Running	38
7	11	97	Jason Kitzmiller	CR7 Motorsports	Chevrolet	200	0	Running	37
8	7	25	Wesley Slimp	Nitro Motorsports	Toyota	199	0	Running	36
9	12	91	Ryan Vargas	Maples Motorsports	Chevrolet	199	0	Running	35
10	15	10	Craig Pellegrini Jr.	Fast Track Racing	Toyota	199	0	Running	34
11	1	18	Max Reaves (R)	Joe Gibbs Racing	Toyota	198	6	Running	35
12	14	85	Quinn Davis (R)	City Garage Motorsports	Ford	197	0	Running	32
13	8	79	Isaac Kitzmiller	ACR Motorsports	Chevrolet	195	0	Running	31
14	17	03	Alex Clubb	Clubb Racing Inc.	Ford	194	0	Running	30
15	23	89	Bobby Dale Earnhardt	Rise Racing	Chevrolet	193	0	Running	29
16	24	06	Nate Moeller	Wayne Peterson Motorsports	Toyota	189	0	Running	28
17	21	48	Brad Smith	Brad Smith Motorsports	Ford	187	0	Running	27
18	20	86	Jeff Maconi (R)	Clubb Racing Inc.	Ford	184	0	Running	26
19	26	34	Brian Barbarow	VWV Racing	Toyota	174	0	Running	25
20	13	12	Takuma Koga	Fast Track Racing	Toyota	166	0	Mechanical	24
21	6	71	Andy Jankowiak	KLAS Motorsports	Chevrolet	155	0	Running	23
22	22	13	Rita Goulet	Integrity Autosports	Toyota	139	0	Running	22
23	25	98	Dale Shearer	Shearer Speed Racing	Toyota	118	0	Mechanical	21
24	19	19	Austin Vaughn	Maples Motorsports	Ford	74	0	Oil Pressure	20
25	10	95	Jackson McLerran	MAN Motorsports	Toyota	63	0	Mechanical	19
26	18	99	Michael Maples	Maples Motorsports	Chevrolet	50	0	Brakes	18
27	16	11	Matt Kemp	Fast Track Racing	Ford	20	0	Mechanical	17
28	27	1	Kenna Long	Maples Motorsports	Chevrolet	9	0	Quit	16
Official race results

=== Race statistics ===
- Lead changes: 2 among 2 different drivers
- Cautions/Laps: 7 for 60 laps
- Red flags: 0
- Time of race: 1 hour, 37 minutes and 0 seconds
- Average speed: 61.824 miles per hour (99.496 km/h)

== Standings after the race ==
Drivers' Championship standings (ARCA Main)

	Pos	Driver	Points
	1	Jake Bollman	265
	2	Ryan Vargas	248 (–17)
1	3	Thomas Annunziata	245 (–20)
1	4	Andy Jankowiak	234 (–31)
	5	Jason Kitzmiller	222 (–43)
	6	Isabella Robusto	220 (–45)
	7	Takuma Koga	206 (–59)
	8	Michael Maples	195 (–70)
	9	Bobby Dale Earnhardt	181 (–84)
	10	Alex Clubb	172 (–93)

Drivers' Championship standings (ARCA East)

	Pos	Driver	Points
	1	Tristan McKee	185
	2	Max Reaves	165 (–20)
	3	Isaac Kitzmiller	152 (–33)
1	4	Craig Pellegrini Jr.	141 (–44)
1	5	Jackson McLerran	129 (–56)
1	6	Nate Moeller	118 (–67)
5	7	Carson Brown	118 (–67)
2	8	Austin Vaughn	114 (–71)
1	9	Quinn Davis	111 (–74)
1	10	Michael Maples	96 (–89)

- Note: Only the first 10 positions are included for the driver standings.

Previous race: 2026 General Tire 100 at The Glen	ARCA Menards Series; 2026 season	Next race: 2026 Henry Ford Health 200

Previous race: 2026 Music City 150	ARCA Menards Series East; 2026 season	Next race: LiUNA! 150 (ARCA)
