= Brandon Oakley =

American racing driver (born 1994)

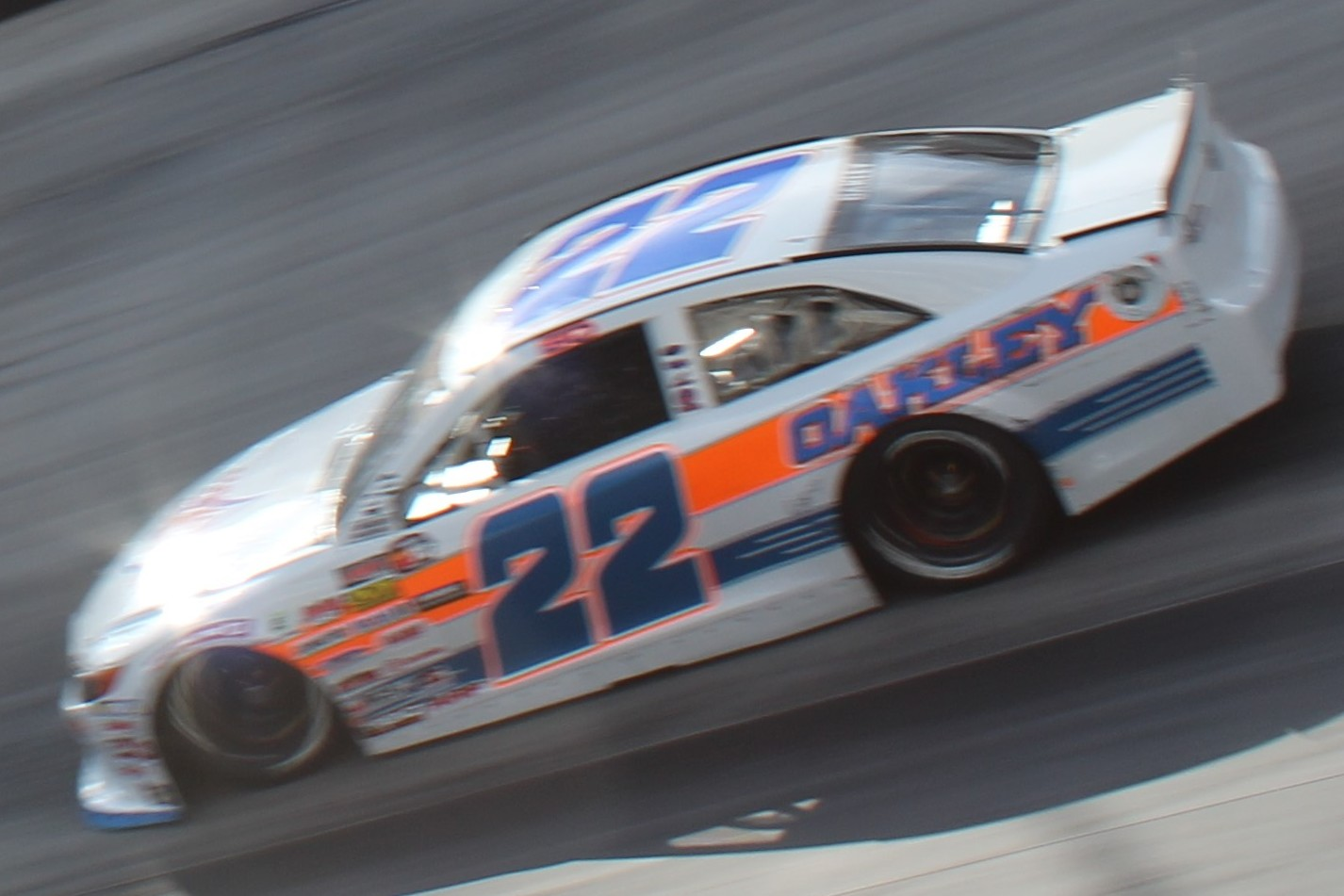
- Oakley's No. 22 car at Bristol Motor Speedway in 2019
- Born: July 13, 1994 (age 32); Beavercreek, Ohio, U.S.

ARCA Menards Series East career
- 12 races run over 8 years
- Best finish: 19th (2019)
- First race: 2014 JEGS 150 (Columbus)
- Last race: 2021 Jeep Beach 175 (New Smyrna)
Wins	Top tens	Poles
0	2	0
- Statistics up to date as of November 17, 2024.

Brandon Oakley (born July 30, 1994) is an American professional stock car racing driver who has competed in the ARCA Menards Series East.

Oakley has also previously competed in series such as the ASA CRA Super Series, the CRA JEGS All-Stars Tour, the Ohio 300 Series, and the World Series of Asphalt Stock Car Racing.

== Motorsports results ==
=== ARCA Menards Series East ===
(key) (Bold - Pole position awarded by qualifying time. Italics - Pole position earned by points standings or practice time. * – Most laps led.)

ARCA Menards Series East results
Year	Team	No.	Make	1	2	3	4	5	6	7	8	9	10	11	12	13	14	15	16	AMSEC	Pts	Ref
2014	Thomas Oakley	57	Chevy	NSM	DAY	BRI	GRE	RCH	IOW	BGS	FIF	LGY	NHA	COL; 19	IOW	GLN	VIR	GRE	DOV	60th	25	
2015	Thomas Oakley	57	Chevy	NSM; Wth	GRE	BRI	IOW	BGS	LGY	COL	NHA	IOW	GLN	MOT	VIR	RCH	DOV			N/A	0	
2016	Thomas Oakley	51	Toyota	NSM	MOB	GRE	BRI	VIR	DOM	STA	COL; 18	NHA	IOW	GLN	GRE; 18	NJM	DOV			42nd	52	
2017	Thomas Oakley	51	Ford	NSM	GRE	BRI	SBO	SBO	MEM	BLN	TMP	NHA; 10	IOW; 25	GLN	LGY	NJM	DOV			35th	53	
2018	Thomas Oakley	51	Ford	NSM; 14	BRI; 14	LGY	SBO	SBO	MEM	NJM	THO	NHA	IOW	GLN	GTW	NHA	DOV			34th	60	
2019	Thomas Oakley	22	Toyota	NSM; 13	BRI; 14	SBO	SBO	MEM; 13	NHA	IOW; 14	GLN	BRI	GTW	NHA	DOV					19th	122	
2020	Thomas Oakley	22	Toyota	NSM; Wth	TOL	DOV	TOL	BRI	FIF; Wth											N/A	0	
2021	Thomas Oakley	22	Toyota	NSM; 8	FIF	NSV	DOV	SNM	IOW	MLW	BRI									36th	36	

=== CARS Super Late Model Tour ===
(key)

CARS Super Late Model Tour results
Year	Team	No.	Make	1	2	3	4	5	6	7	8	CSLMTC	Pts	Ref
2020	N/A	22	Toyota	SNM	HCY	JEN	HCY	FCS	BRI	FLC	NSH; 17	N/A	0	
