= Josh Fanopoulos =

American racing driver

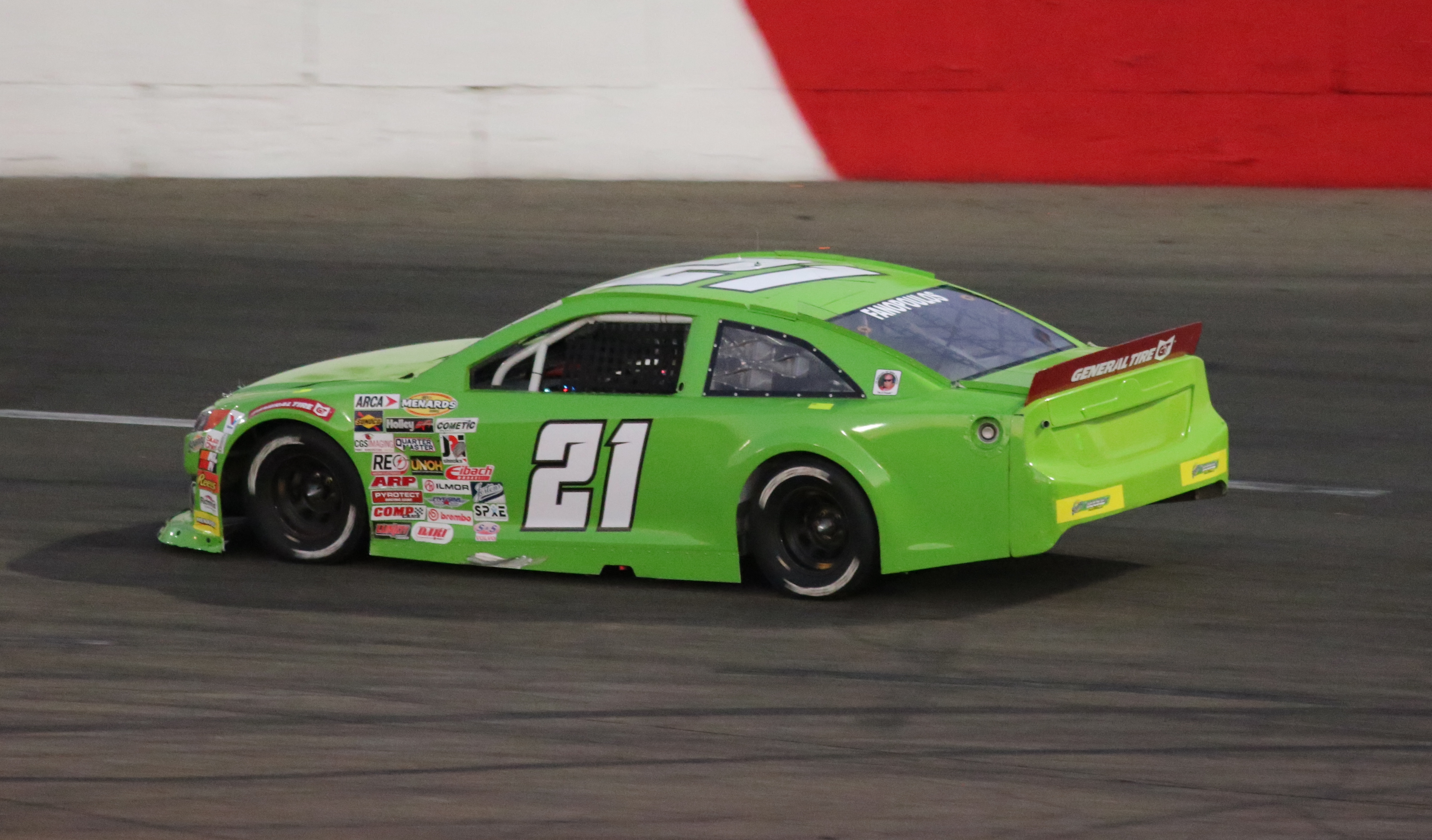
- Fanopoulos' No. 21 car at All American Speedway in 2021
- Born: February 11, 1985 (age 41); Boise, Idaho, U.S.

ARCA Menards Series East career
- 5 races run over 1 year
- Best finish: 17th (2019)
- First race: 2019 United Site Services 70 (New Hampshire)
- Last race: 2019 General Tire 125 (Dover)
Wins	Top tens	Poles
0	0	0

ARCA Menards Series West career
- 12 races run over 3 years
- Best finish: 15th (2021)
- First race: 2017 NAPA Auto Parts Idaho 208 (Meridian)
- Last race: 2021 Arizona Lottery 100 (Phoenix)
Wins	Top tens	Poles
0	2	0
- Statistics up to date as of April 21, 2023.

Josh Fanopoulos (born February 11, 1985) is an American professional stock car racing driver who has previously competed in the NASCAR K&N Pro Series East and ARCA Menards Series West.

== Racing career ==
In 2017, Fanopoulos made his debut in the NASCAR K&N Pro Series West at Meridian Speedway, driving the No. 39 Toyota for Patriot Motorsports Group, where he started 21st and finished eight laps down in sixteenth place. He then made another start with the team at the next race at All American Speedway, where he started 23rd and finished seven laps down in 22nd place.

In 2019, Fanopolous joined Kart Idaho Racing to make select starts in the West Series, getting a best finish of sixth at Meridian. He also made four starts with the team in the NASCAR K&N Pro Series East, getting a best finish of eleventh at the season ending race at Dover International Speedway.

In 2021, Fanapoulos returned to the West Series with Kart Idaho Racing at Irwindale Speedway, driving the No. 08 Chevrolet, where he finished eighteenth due to transmission issues. He then ran the next race at Colorado National Speedway, this time driving the No. 21, where he started eighteenth and finished four laps in fourteenth place. He then ran the last three races of the year in the No. 21, this time driving a Toyota, where he finished ninth at the Las Vegas Motor Speedway Bullring, 21st at Roseville due to a crash, and 31st at Phoenix Raceway due to crash damage. He has not competed in the series since then, as he has since made starts in the Speed Tour Super Late Models Series and the Lucas Oil Modified Series. as well as running Bud Light NASCAR Modifieds at Meridian Speedway.

== Motorsports results ==
=== NASCAR ===
(key) (Bold – Pole position awarded by qualifying time. Italics – Pole position earned by points standings or practice time. * – Most laps led.)

==== K&N Pro Series East ====
NASCAR K&N Pro Series East results
Year	Team	No.	Make	1	2	3	4	5	6	7	8	9	10	11	12	NKNPSEC	Pts	Ref
2019	Kart Idaho Racing	38	Chevy	NSM	BRI	SBO	SBO	MEM	NHA; 13	IOW; 17	GLN	BRI				17th	155	
2019	Kart Idaho Racing	36	Chevy										GTW; 12		DOV; 11	17th	155	
2019	Kart Idaho Racing	08	Toyota											NHA; 12		17th	155	

=== ARCA Menards Series West ===
(key) (Bold – Pole position awarded by qualifying time. Italics – Pole position earned by points standings or practice time. * – Most laps led. ** – All laps led.)

ARCA Menards Series West results
Year	Team	No.	Make	1	2	3	4	5	6	7	8	9	10	11	12	13	14	AMSWC	Pts	Ref
2017	Patriot Motorsports Group	39	Toyota	TUS	KCR	IRW	IRW	SPO	OSS	CNS	SON	IOW	EVG	DCS	MER; 16	AAS; 22	KCR	33rd	50	
2019	Kart Idaho Racing	38	Chevy	LVS	IRW	TUS	TUS	CNS	SON	DCS	IOW; 17							16th	157	
2019	Kart Idaho Racing	37	Ford									EVG; 13						16th	157	
2019	Kart Idaho Racing	36	Chevy										GTW; 12	MER; 6	AAS; 15	KCR	PHO	16th	157	
2021	Kart Idaho Racing	08	Chevy	PHO	SON	IRW; 18												15th	127	
2021	Kart Idaho Racing	21	Chevy				CNS; 14	IRW	PIR									15th	127	
2021	Kart Idaho Racing	21	Toyota							LVS; 9	AAS; 21	PHO; 31						15th	127	
