= Juan Manuel González (racing driver) =

Mexican professional stock car racing driver

- Born: Juan Manuel González Iglesias; April 21, 1999 (age 27); Mexico City, Mexico
- Achievements: 2019 NASCAR FedEx Challenge Series Champion

NASCAR FedEx Freight Truck Series career
- 1 race run over 1 year
- 2019 position: 91st
- Best finish: 91st (2019)
- First race: 2019 M&M's 200 (Iowa)
| Wins | Top tens | Poles |
|---|---|---|
| 0 | 0 | 0 |
- Statistics up to date as of November 20, 2020.

Juan Manuel González Iglesias (born April 21, 1999) is a Mexican professional stock car racing driver. He last competed part-time in the NASCAR Camping World Truck Series, driving the No. 60 Ford F-150 for Lira Motorsports. He is the 2019 NASCAR FedEx Challenge Series champion.

== Motorsports career results ==
=== NASCAR ===
(key) (Bold – Pole position awarded by qualifying time. Italics – Pole position earned by points standings or practice time. * – Most laps led.)

==== Gander Outdoors Truck Series ====
NASCAR Gander Outdoors Truck Series results
| Year | Team | No. | Make | 1 | 2 | 3 | 4 | 5 | 6 | 7 | 8 | 9 | 10 | 11 | 12 | 13 | 14 | 15 | 16 | 17 | 18 | 19 | 20 | 21 | 22 | 23 | NGOTC | Pts | Ref |
|---|---|---|---|---|---|---|---|---|---|---|---|---|---|---|---|---|---|---|---|---|---|---|---|---|---|---|---|---|---|
| 2019 | Jennifer Jo Cobb Racing | 10 | Chevy | DAY | ATL | LVS | MAR; DNQ | TEX | DOV | KAN | CLT | TEX | IOW; 30 | GTW | CHI | KEN | POC | ELD | MCH | BRI | MSP | LVS | TAL | MAR | PHO | HOM | 91st | 7 | |

==== K&N Pro Series East ====
NASCAR K&N Pro Series East results
| Year | Team | No. | Make | 1 | 2 | 3 | 4 | 5 | 6 | 7 | 8 | 9 | 10 | 11 | 12 | 13 | 14 | NKNPSEC | Pts | Ref |
|---|---|---|---|---|---|---|---|---|---|---|---|---|---|---|---|---|---|---|---|---|
| 2018 | NextGen Motorsports | 5 | Toyota | NSM; 18 | BRI; 20 | | | | | | | | | | | | DOV; 16 | 13th | 276 | |
| 2018 | NextGen Motorsports | 5 | Chevy | | | LGY; 12 | SBO; 7 | SBO; 14 | MEM; 17 | NJM | THO | NHA | IOW | | GTW; 22 | | | 13th | 276 | |
| 2018 | NextGen Motorsports | 25 | Chevy | | | | | | | | | | | GLN; 23 | | | | 13th | 276 | |
| 2018 | NextGen Motorsports | 55 | Toyota | | | | | | | | | | | | | NHA; 15 | | 13th | 276 | |
| 2019 | Vizion Motorsports | 5 | Toyota | NSM; 18 | BRI | SBO | SBO | MEM | NHA | IOW | GLN | BRI | GTW | NHA | DOV | | | 45th | 26 | |

^{*} Season still in progress
^{1} Ineligible for series points
