= 2019 NASCAR K&N Pro Series East =

15th season of the NASCAR K&N Pro Series East

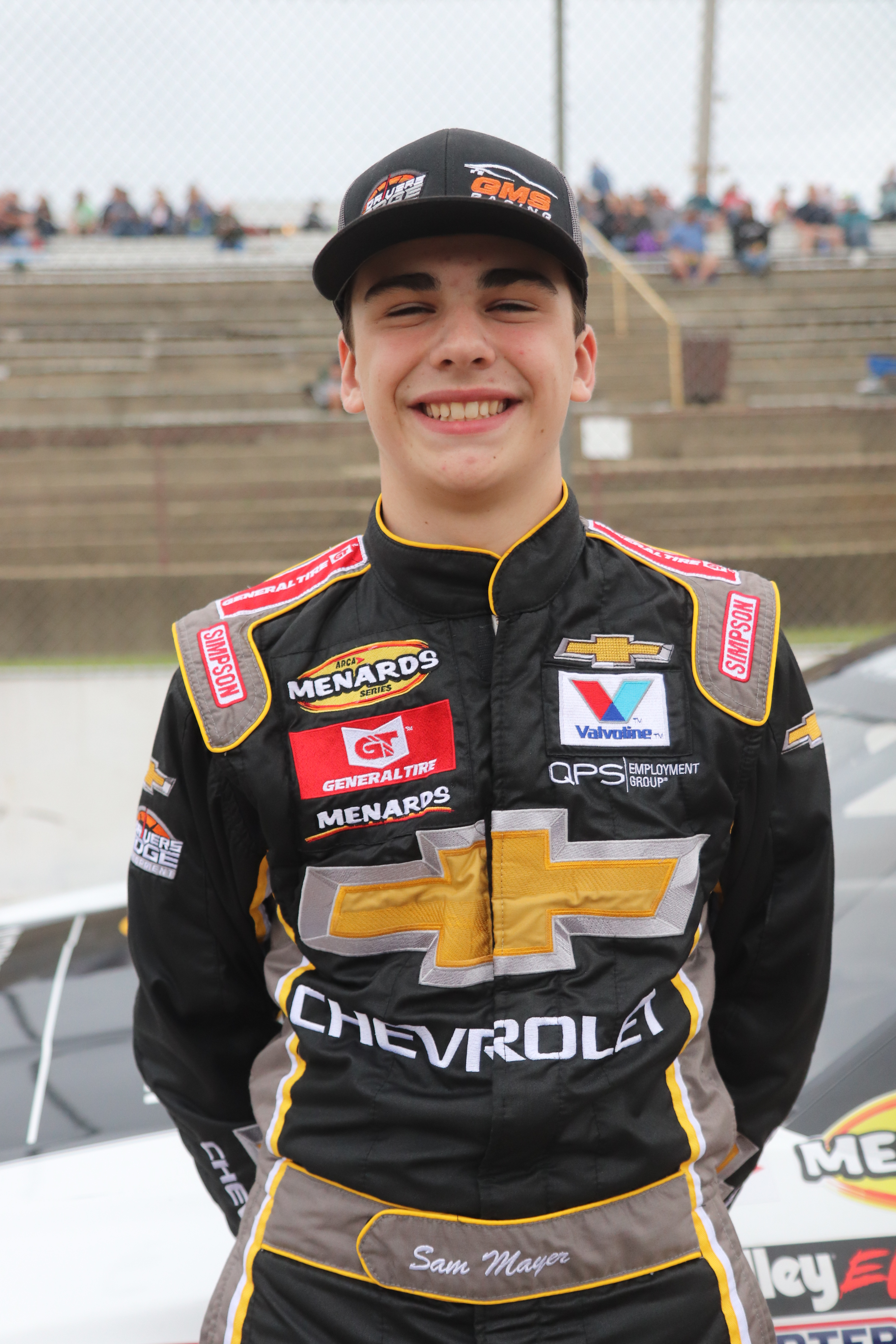
Sam Mayer, the 2019 K&N Pro Series East champion.

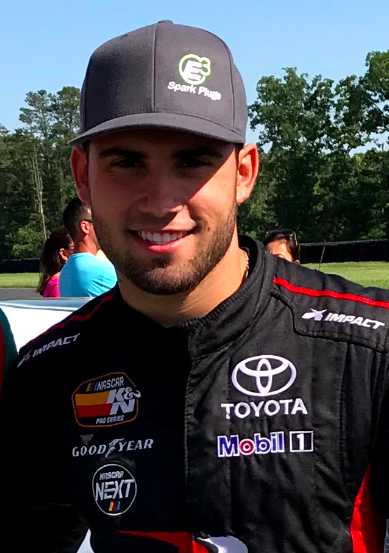
Chase Cabre finished second behind Mayer in the championship by 39 points.

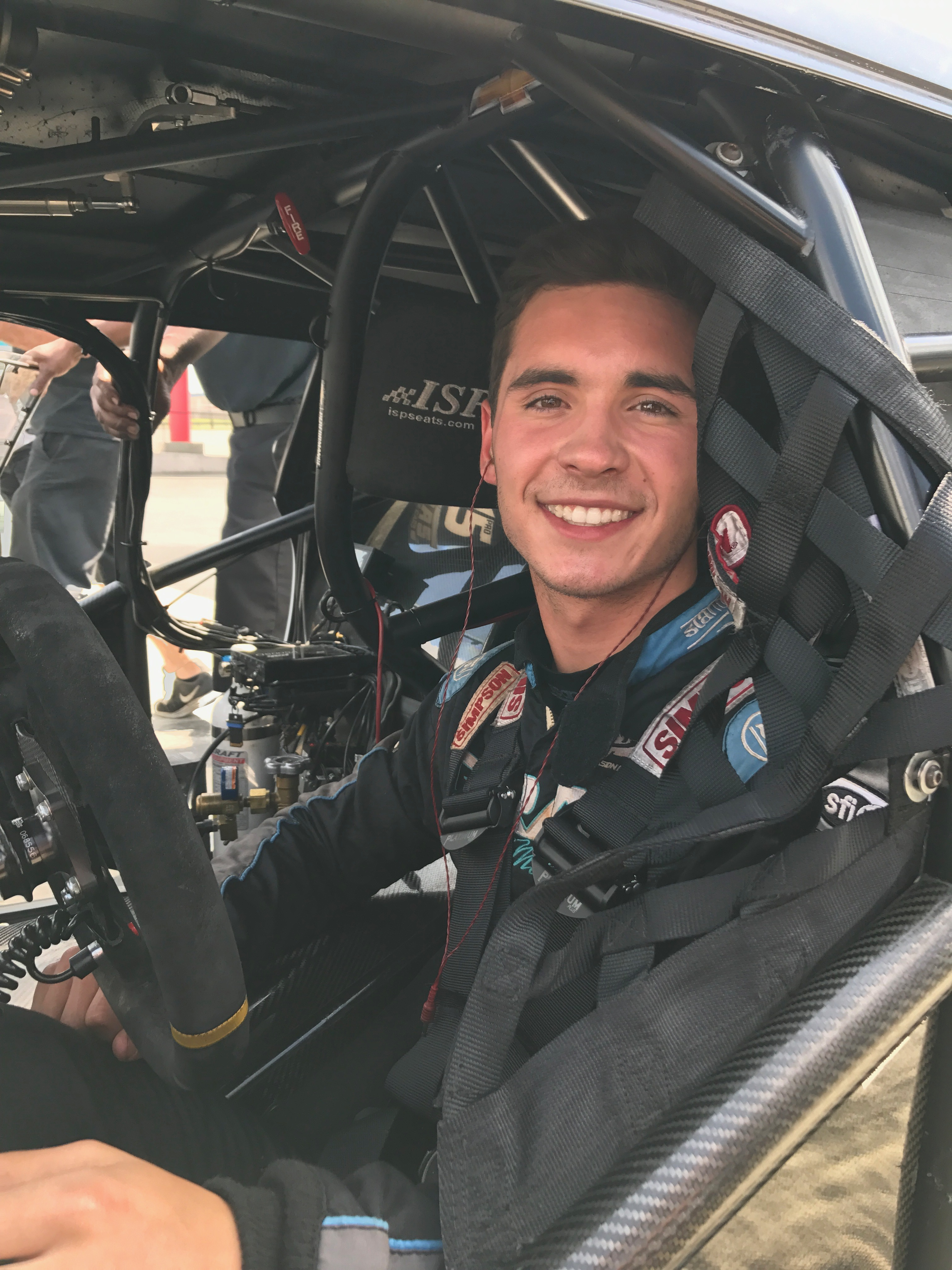
Tanner Gray finished third in the championship.

The 2019 NASCAR K&N Pro Series East was the 33rd season of the K&N Pro Series East, a regional stock car racing series sanctioned by NASCAR. It began with the New Smyrna 175 at New Smyrna Speedway on February 11 and concluded with the General Tire 125 at Dover International Speedway on October 4. General Tire took over the position as the official tire supplier of the series from Goodyear. Sam Mayer was crowned the series champion, becoming the youngest champion in series history, at 16 years, 3 months, 8 days, topping the previous record set by Todd Gilliland after he won the 2016 title. Tyler Ankrum entered the season as the defending drivers' champion, but he did not defend his championship because he moved up to the Truck Series full time in 2019.

This was the last season of the series before it became an ARCA series in 2020 as part of the unification of the NASCAR K&N Pro Series East and West and the ARCA Menards Series.

== Teams and drivers ==
=== Complete schedule ===
Manufacturer	Team	No.	Driver	Crew chief
Chevrolet	GMS Racing	21	Sam Mayer (R)	Mardy Lindley
Ford	Rette Jones Racing	30	Spencer Davis	Mark Rette
Toyota	DGR-Crosley	15	Tanner Gray (R)	Seth Smith
Toyota	DGR-Crosley	54	Drew Dollar (R) 7	Derek Smith 2 Kevin Manion 4 Chris Lawson 5 Blake Bainbridge 1
Toyota	DGR-Crosley	54	Riley Herbst 1	Derek Smith 2 Kevin Manion 4 Chris Lawson 5 Blake Bainbridge 1
Toyota	DGR-Crosley	54	Hailie Deegan 1	Derek Smith 2 Kevin Manion 4 Chris Lawson 5 Blake Bainbridge 1
Toyota	DGR-Crosley	54	David Gilliland (R) 1	Derek Smith 2 Kevin Manion 4 Chris Lawson 5 Blake Bainbridge 1
Toyota	DGR-Crosley	54	Ty Gibbs (R) 1	Derek Smith 2 Kevin Manion 4 Chris Lawson 5 Blake Bainbridge 1
Toyota	DGR-Crosley	54	Todd Gilliland 1	Derek Smith 2 Kevin Manion 4 Chris Lawson 5 Blake Bainbridge 1
Toyota	Hattori Racing Enterprises	1	Max McLaughlin (R)	Robert Huffman
Toyota	Rev Racing	4	Chase Cabre	Glenn Parker 1 Doug Howe 11
Toyota	Rev Racing	6	Rubén García Jr.	Steve Plattenberger

=== Limited schedule ===
Manufacturer	Team	No.	Driver	Crew chief	Rounds
Chevrolet	1/4 Ley Racing	32	Dale Quarterley	Alex Quarterley	1
Chevrolet	Ace Motorsports	71	Bill Hoff	Jeffrey Shutt	4
Chevrolet	Marsh Racing	31	Connor Hall	Todd Fisette	1
Chevrolet	Robert Pawlowski Racing	11	Robert Pawlowski	Sammie Brown 1 Aaron Brown 1	2
Chevrolet	Sam Hunt Racing	18	Colin Garrett	Clinton Cram 1 Andrew Abbott 5 Sam Hunt 4 Brian Keselowski 1	10
Chevrolet	Sam Hunt Racing	18	Sam Hunt	Clinton Cram 1 Andrew Abbott 5 Sam Hunt 4 Brian Keselowski 1	1
Ford	Chad Bryant Racing	22	Joe Graf Jr.	Paul Andrews	1
Ford	Jefferson Pitts Racing	7	Dylan Murry	Jeff Jefferson	1
Toyota	Austin Reed Racing	14	Austin Reed (R)	Bond Suss	1
Toyota	Ben Kennedy Racing	20	Anthony Sergi	Glenn Garrison	2
Toyota	Bill McAnally Racing	16	Derek Kraus	John Camilleri	9
Toyota	Bill McAnally Racing	19	Hailie Deegan	Kevin Reed Jr. 2 Kyle Wolosek 6 Kevin Bellicourt 1	7
Toyota	Bill McAnally Racing	19	Todd Gilliland	Kevin Reed Jr. 2 Kyle Wolosek 6 Kevin Bellicourt 1	1
Toyota	Bill McAnally Racing	19	Brandon Jones	Kevin Reed Jr. 2 Kyle Wolosek 6 Kevin Bellicourt 1	1
Toyota	Bill McAnally Racing	50	Raphaël Lessard (R)	Doug George	1
Toyota	Bill McAnally Racing	50	Lawless Alan (R)	Doug George	1
Toyota	Bill McAnally Racing	99	Brittney Zamora (R)	Kevin Bellicourt	6
Toyota	Brandon Oakley Racing	22	Brandon Oakley	Ron Otto	4
Toyota	DGR-Crosley	17	Ty Gibbs (R)	Blake Bainbridge	5
Toyota	DGR-Crosley	17	Riley Herbst	Blake Bainbridge	2
Toyota	DGR-Crosley	17	Drew Dollar (R)	Blake Bainbridge	1
Toyota	DGR-Crosley	98	Natalie Decker (R)	Frank Kerr	1
Toyota	Jett Motorsports	09	Jett Noland (R)	Chris Cater	1
Toyota	Rev Racing	2	Nick Sanchez (R)	John Allen 2 Matt Butcher 1	3
Toyota	TC Motorsports	91	Justin Carroll	Dwayne Skinnell 3 Unknown 1 Steven Dawson 1	5
Toyota	Vizion Motorsports	5	Juan Manuel González	Wayne Setterington Jr.	1
Ford 2 Chevrolet 3	Charles Buchanan Racing	87	Chuck Buchanan Jr.	Craig Wood	5
Chevrolet 5 Ford 1 Toyota 1	Kart Idaho Racing	08	Travis Milburn	Sonny Wahl 6 Jason Larivee Sr. 1	5
Chevrolet 5 Ford 1 Toyota 1	Kart Idaho Racing	08	Jason Larivee Jr. (R)	Sonny Wahl 6 Jason Larivee Sr. 1	1
Chevrolet 5 Ford 1 Toyota 1	Kart Idaho Racing	08	Josh Fanopoulos (R)	Sonny Wahl 6 Jason Larivee Sr. 1	1
Ford 2 Chevrolet 2	Kart Idaho Racing	36	Jason Miles (R)	Teddy Brown 2 Kevin McCarty 1 Darrel Pedderson 1	2
Ford 2 Chevrolet 2	Kart Idaho Racing	36	Josh Fanopoulos (R)	Teddy Brown 2 Kevin McCarty 1 Darrel Pedderson 1	2
Chevrolet 6 Toyota 1 Ford 1	Kart Idaho Racing	38	Ron Jay (R)	Mike Holleran 3 John Wood 2 Kevin McCarty 1 Josh Jackson 1 Unknown 1	2
Chevrolet 6 Toyota 1 Ford 1	Kart Idaho Racing	38	Josh Fanopoulos (R)	Mike Holleran 3 John Wood 2 Kevin McCarty 1 Josh Jackson 1 Unknown 1	2
Chevrolet 6 Toyota 1 Ford 1	Kart Idaho Racing	38	John Wood	Mike Holleran 3 John Wood 2 Kevin McCarty 1 Josh Jackson 1 Unknown 1	2
Chevrolet 6 Toyota 1 Ford 1	Kart Idaho Racing	38	Armani Williams	Mike Holleran 3 John Wood 2 Kevin McCarty 1 Josh Jackson 1 Unknown 1	1
Chevrolet 6 Toyota 1 Ford 1	Kart Idaho Racing	38	Stefan Parsons (R)	Mike Holleran 3 John Wood 2 Kevin McCarty 1 Josh Jackson 1 Unknown 1	1
Ford 4 Toyota 1	MAD Motorsports	24	Mason Diaz (R)	Mike Darne	5
Chevrolet 6 Toyota 2	Visconti Motorsports	74	Brandon McReynolds	Bruce Cook 1 Bill Goffin 1 John Visconti III 6	5
Chevrolet 6 Toyota 2	Visconti Motorsports	74	Josh Berry	Bruce Cook 1 Bill Goffin 1 John Visconti III 6	1
Chevrolet 6 Toyota 2	Visconti Motorsports	74	Parker Retzlaff (R)	Bruce Cook 1 Bill Goffin 1 John Visconti III 6	2

== Schedule ==
On December 4, 2018, NASCAR announced the 2019 schedule. Langley and New Jersey were dropped from the schedule in favor a second race at Bristol. All races in the season were televised on NBCSN on a tape delay basis and shown live on FansChoice.tv.

No.	Race title	Track	Location	Date
1	New Smyrna 175	New Smyrna Speedway	New Smyrna Beach, Florida	February 11 (Note: The New Smyrna 175 was postponed a day due to rain.)
2	Zombie Auto 150	Bristol Motor Speedway	Bristol, Tennessee	April 6
3	WhosYourDriver.org Twin 100s	South Boston Speedway	South Boston, Virginia	May 4/5 (Note: The first 20 laps of the second WhosYourDriver.org Twin 100 race were run on May 4, before the race was red flagged and stopped for rain. The last 80 laps were run on 5 May.)
4	WhosYourDriver.org Twin 100s	South Boston Speedway	South Boston, Virginia	May 4/5
5	Memphis 150 presented by AutoZone	Memphis International Raceway	Millington, Tennessee	June 1
6	United Site Services 70	New Hampshire Motor Speedway	Loudon, New Hampshire	July 20
7	Casey's General Store 150 (Note: The Casey's General Store 150 was held as a combined event, with competitors from the K&N Pro Series East competing along with competitors for the K&N Pro Series West. Drivers received points and statistical credit relative to the whole field in general, instead of relative to other drivers in their series.)	Iowa Speedway	Newton, Iowa	July 26
8	Great Outdoors RV Superstore 100	Watkins Glen International	Watkins Glen, New York	August 2
9	Bush's Beans 150	Bristol Motor Speedway	Bristol, Tennessee	August 15
10	Monaco Cocktails Gateway Classic 125 (Note: The Monaco Cocktails Gateway Classic 125 was held as a combined event, with competitors from the K&N Pro Series East competing along with competitors for the K&N Pro Series West. Drivers received points and statistical credit relative to the whole field in general, instead of relative to other drivers in their series.)	World Wide Technology Raceway	Madison, Illinois	August 24
11	Apple Barrel 125	New Hampshire Motor Speedway	Loudon, New Hampshire	September 21
12	General Tire 125	Dover International Speedway	Dover, Delaware	October 4

Notes

- The race at Thompson Speedway Motorsports Park was originally scheduled for June 15, but was cancelled on June 4 and was not replaced.

== Results and standings ==
=== Races ===
No.	Race	Pole position	Most laps led	Winning driver	Manufacturer	No.	Winning team
1	New Smyrna 175	Hailie Deegan^{1}	Colin Garrett	Derek Kraus	Toyota	19	Bill McAnally Racing
2	Zombie Auto 150	Sam Mayer	Sam Mayer	Sam Mayer	Chevrolet	21	GMS Racing
3	WhosYourDriver.org Twin 100s	Tanner Gray	Tanner Gray	Tanner Gray	Toyota	15	DGR-Crosley
4	WhosYourDriver.org Twin 100s	Nick Sanchez^{2}	Derek Kraus	Derek Kraus	Toyota	19	Bill McAnally Racing
5	Memphis 150 presented by AutoZone	Max McLaughlin	Max McLaughlin	Chase Cabre	Toyota	4	Rev Racing
6	United Site Services 70	Chase Cabre	Chase Cabre	Chase Cabre	Toyota	4	Rev Racing
7	Casey's General Store 150	Sam Mayer	Sam Mayer	Sam Mayer	Chevrolet	21	GMS Racing
8	Great Outdoors RV Superstore 100	Max McLaughlin	Max McLaughlin	Max McLaughlin	Toyota	1	Hattori Racing Enterprises
9	Bush's Beans 150	Chase Cabre	Spencer Davis	Sam Mayer	Chevrolet	21	GMS Racing
10	Monaco Cocktails Gateway Classic 125	Chase Cabre	Chase Cabre	Spencer Davis	Ford	30	Rette Jones Racing
11	Apple Barrel 125	Chase Cabre	Ty Gibbs	Ty Gibbs	Toyota	54	DGR-Crosley
12	General Tire 125	Sam Mayer	Sam Mayer	Sam Mayer	Chevrolet	21	GMS Racing

- ^{1} – The qualifying session for the New Smyrna 175 was cancelled due to weather. The starting lineup was decided by practice results.
- ^{2} – Starting grid was set by the fastest lap times from the first WhosYourDriver.org Twin 100 race.

=== Drivers' championship ===
(key) Bold – Pole position awarded by time. Italics – Pole position set by final practice results or Owners' points. * – Most laps led.

Pos.	Driver	NSM	BRI	SBO	SBO	MEM	NHA	IOW	GLN	BRI	GTW	NHA	DOV	Points
1	Sam Mayer **(R)**	4	**1***	2	11^{2}	4	2	**1***	3	1	4	5	**1***	511
2	Chase Cabre	17	2	8	2	1	**1***	5	2	**8**	**13***	**6**	5	472
3	Tanner Gray **(R)**	12	10	**1***	4	3	5	6	11	6	15	2	2	458
4	Spencer Davis	7	5	4	5	14	7	9	8	5*	1	4	7	458
5	Max McLaughlin **(R)**	11	13	3	3	**6***	4	10	**1***	7	19	13	6	440
6	Rubén García Jr.	8	17	5	7^{3}	12	14	3	5	3	6	7	8	433
7	Derek Kraus	1	6	9	1*	5	3	4	9		2			366
8	Colin Garrett	6*	7	6	14	11	9	13	10	14	8			344
9	Drew Dollar **(R)**	9	4	12	6	7	8	7					4	297
10	Hailie Deegan	16	16	10	12^{4}		11	12		9	9			258
11	Brittney Zamora **(R)**	15	11			9	12	20			16			181
12	Brandon McReynolds	3	3				17			10			9	178
13	Ty Gibbs **(R)**	2				2		2	4	2		1*		172
14	Justin Carroll			11	10					13		9	10	167
15	Mason Diaz **(R)**	14	8	DNS^{1}	DNS^{1}					4				160
16	Travis Milburn			7	9			15	17		14			158
17	Josh Fanopoulos **(R)**						13	17			12	12	11	155
18	Chuck Buchanan Jr.	19	15	16	DNS^{1}					15				139
19	Brandon Oakley	13	14			13		14						122
20	Bill Hoff						15		13			14	12	122
21	Nick Sanchez **(R)**			14	**8**							8		103
22	Riley Herbst		18				6		12					96
23	Todd Gilliland					8							3	77
24	Parker Retzlaff **(R)**					10					5			73
25	Anthony Sergi	5	12											71
26	Robert Pawlowski								16			10		62
27	Jason Miles **(R)**			13	13									62
28	Ron Jay **(R)**			15										58
29	John Wood				15				15		17			56
30	David Gilliland **(R)**										3			41
31	Josh Berry											3		41
32	Dylan Murry								6					38
33	Dale Quarterley								7					37
34	Raphaël Lessard **(R)**		9											35
35	Connor Hall	10												34
36	Lawless Alan **(R)**						10							34
37	Jett Noland **(R)**							Wth		11				33
38	Armani Williams											11		33
39	Austin Reed **(R)**									12				32
40	Sam Hunt												13	31
41	Brandon Jones								14					30
42	Stefan Parsons **(R)**												14	30
43	Jason Larivee Jr. **(R)**						16							28
44	Joe Graf Jr.									16				28
45	Juan Manuel González	18												26
46	Natalie Decker **(R)**		19											25
Drivers ineligible for K&N Pro Series East points
	Jagger Jones **(R)**							11			7			
	Trevor Huddleston							8			18			
	Todd Souza							16			10			
	Takuma Koga							18			11			
	Taylor Canfield							19						
Pos.	Driver	NSM	BRI	SBO	SBO	MEM	NHA	IOW	GLN	BRI	GTW	NHA	DOV	Points

Notes

- ^{1} – Chuck Buchanan Jr. and Mason Diaz received championship points, despite the fact that they did not start the race.
- ^{2} – Sam Mayer was unable to complete the last 80 laps after the rain delay due to prior commitments. Kyle Benjamin substituted for Mayer.
- ^{3} – Rubén García Jr. was unable to complete the last 80 laps after the rain delay due to a conflict with a PEAK Mexico Series race. Colin Garrett substituted for García Jr., after he crashed out his No. 18 entry on lap thirteen.
- ^{4} – Hailie Deegan was unable to complete the last 80 laps after the rain delay due to family reasons. Nobody substituted for her.

== See also ==
- 2019 Monster Energy NASCAR Cup Series
- 2019 NASCAR Xfinity Series
- 2019 NASCAR Gander Outdoors Truck Series
- 2019 ARCA Menards Series
- 2019 NASCAR K&N Pro Series West
- 2019 NASCAR Whelen Modified Tour
- 2019 NASCAR Pinty's Series
- 2019 NASCAR PEAK Mexico Series
- 2019 NASCAR Whelen Euro Series
- 2019 CARS Tour
