= 2019 TruNorth Global 250 =

Race details
- Race 4 of 23 in the 2019 NASCAR Gander Outdoors Truck Series season
- Martinsville Speedway
- Date: March 23, 2019
- Location: Martinsville Speedway in Ridgeway, Virginia
- Course: Permanent racing facility
- Course length: 0.526 miles (0.847 km)
- Distance: 250 laps, 131.5 mi (211.75 km)

Pole position
Driver	Stewart Friesen	Halmar Friesen Racing
- Time: 19.630

Most laps led
Driver	Kyle Busch	Kyle Busch Motorsports
- Laps: 174

Winner
No. 51	Kyle Busch	Kyle Busch Motorsports

Television in the United States
- Network: FOX

Radio in the United States
- Radio: MRN

The 2019 TruNorth Global 250 was a NASCAR Gander Outdoors Truck Series race held on March 23, 2019, at Martinsville Speedway in Ridgeway, Virginia. Contested over 250 laps on the .526 mile (.847 km) paperclip-shaped short track, it was the fourth race of the 2019 NASCAR Gander Outdoors Truck Series season.

== Entry list ==
No.	Driver	Team	Manufacturer
1	Travis Kvapil	Beaver Motorsports	Chevrolet
02	Tyler Dippel (R)	Young's Motorsports	Chevrolet
2	Sheldon Creed (R)	GMS Racing	Chevrolet
3	Jordan Anderson	Jordan Anderson Racing	Chevrolet
04	Cory Roper	Roper Racing	Ford
4	Todd Gilliland	Kyle Busch Motorsports	Toyota
6	Norm Benning	Norm Benning Racing	Chevrolet
7	Korbin Forrister	All Out Motorsports	Toyota
8	Austin Dillon (i)	NEMCO Motorsports	Chevrolet
9	Codie Rohrbaugh	Grant County Mulch Racing	Chevrolet
10	Juan Manuel González	Jennifer Jo Cobb Racing	Chevrolet
11	Spencer Davis	Rette Jones Racing	Ford
12	Gus Dean (R)	Young's Motorsports	Chevrolet
13	Johnny Sauter	ThorSport Racing	Ford
16	Austin Hill	Hattori Racing Enterprises	Toyota
17	Tyler Ankrum (R)	DGR-Crosley	Toyota
18	Harrison Burton (R)	Kyle Busch Motorsports	Toyota
19	Derek Kraus	Bill McAnally Racing	Toyota
20	Spencer Boyd (R)	Young's Motorsports	Chevrolet
22	Bubba Wallace (i)	AM Racing	Chevrolet
24	Brett Moffitt	GMS Racing	Chevrolet
27	Myatt Snider	ThorSport Racing	Ford
30	Brennan Poole (R)	On Point Motorsports	Toyota
33	Daniel Sasnett	Reaume Brothers Racing	Chevrolet
43	Tony Mrakovich	Tony Mrakovich Racing	Chevrolet
44	Reid Wilson	Niece Motorsports	Chevrolet
45	Ross Chastain (i)	Niece Motorsports	Chevrolet
46	Raphaël Lessard	Kyle Busch Motorsports	Toyota
49	Ray Ciccarelli	CMI Motorsports	Chevrolet
51	Kyle Busch (i)	Kyle Busch Motorsports	Toyota
52	Stewart Friesen	Halmar Friesen Racing	Chevrolet
54	David Gilliland	DGR-Crosley	Toyota
56	Timmy Hill (i)	Hill Motorsports	Chevrolet
63	Dawson Cram	Copp Motorsports	Chevrolet
88	Matt Crafton	ThorSport Racing	Ford
92	Austin Theriault	RBR Enterprises	Ford
98	Grant Enfinger	ThorSport Racing	Ford
99	Ben Rhodes	ThorSport Racing	Ford

== Practice ==
=== First practice ===
Tyler Ankrum was the fastest in the first practice session with a time of 20.030 seconds and a speed of 94.538 mph (152.144 km/h).

Pos	No.	Driver	Team	Manufacturer	Time	Speed
1	17	Tyler Ankrum (R)	DGR-Crosley	Toyota	20.030	94.538
2	24	Brett Moffitt	GMS Racing	Chevrolet	20.051	94.439
3	27	Myatt Snider	ThorSport Racing	Ford	20.059	94.402

=== Final practice ===
Todd Gilliland was the fastest in the final practice session with a time of 19.919 seconds and a speed of 95.065 mph (152.992 km/h).

Pos	No.	Driver	Team	Manufacturer	Time	Speed
1	4	Todd Gilliland	Kyle Busch Motorsports	Toyota	19.919	95.065
2	52	Stewart Friesen	Halmar Friesen Racing	Chevrolet	19.965	94.846
3	2	Sheldon Creed (R)	GMS Racing	Chevrolet	19.968	94.832

== Qualifying ==
Stewart Friesen scored the pole for the race with a time of 19.630 seconds and a speed of 96.465 mph (155.245 km/h).

=== Qualifying results ===
Pos	No	Driver	Team	Manufacturer	R1	R2	R3
1	52	Stewart Friesen	Halmar Friesen Racing	Chevrolet	20.037	19.747	19.630
2	51	Kyle Busch (i)	Kyle Busch Motorsports	Toyota	19.758	19.733	19.650
3	4	Todd Gilliland	Kyle Busch Motorsports	Toyota	19.938	19.763	19.674
4	2	Sheldon Creed (R)	GMS Racing	Chevrolet	19.866	19.739	19.684
5	24	Brett Moffitt	GMS Racing	Chevrolet	19.928	19.702	19.688
6	88	Matt Crafton	ThorSport Racing	Ford	20.033	19.748	19.698
7	46	Raphaël Lessard	Kyle Busch Motorsports	Toyota	20.024	19.758	19.708
8	13	Johnny Sauter	ThorSport Racing	Ford	19.816	19.750	19.722
9	16	Austin Hill	Hattori Racing Enterprises	Toyota	19.986	19.737	19.818
10	45	Ross Chastain (i)	Niece Motorsports	Chevrolet	19.927	19.735	19.835
11	19	Derek Kraus	Bill McAnally Racing	Toyota	20.004	19.794	19.877
12	8	Austin Dillon (i)	NEMCO Motorsports	Chevrolet	20.072	19.758	19.898
13	22	Bubba Wallace (i)	AM Racing	Chevrolet	19.936	19.799	—
14	17	Tyler Ankrum (R)	DGR-Crosley	Toyota	19.828	19.806	—
15	27	Myatt Snider	ThorSport Racing	Ford	19.916	19.807	—
16	99	Ben Rhodes	ThorSport Racing	Ford	20.017	19.809	—
17	12	Gus Dean (R)	Young's Motorsports	Chevrolet	19.979	19.837	—
18	18	Harrison Burton (R)	Kyle Busch Motorsports	Toyota	19.855	19.845	—
19	98	Grant Enfinger	ThorSport Racing	Ford	20.035	19.876	—
20	02	Tyler Dippel (R)	Young's Motorsports	Chevrolet	19.926	19.877	—
21	54	David Gilliland	DGR-Crosley	Toyota	20.076	19.897	—
22	04	Cory Roper	Roper Racing	Ford	19.956	19.973	—
23	56	Timmy Hill (i)	Hill Motorsports	Chevrolet	20.041	20.074	—
24	11	Spencer Davis	Rette Jones Racing	Ford	20.097	20.151	—
25	20	Spencer Boyd (R)	Young's Motorsports	Chevrolet	20.103	—	—
26	92	Austin Theriault	RBR Enterprises	Ford	20.107	—	—
27	44	Reid Wilson	Niece Motorsports	Chevrolet	20.118	—	—
28	30	Brennan Poole (R)	On Point Motorsports	Toyota	20.178	—	—
29	3	Jordan Anderson	Jordan Anderson Racing	Chevrolet	20.263	—	—
30	7	Korbin Forrister	All Out Motorsports	Toyota	20.263	—	—
31	33	Daniel Sasnett	Reaume Brothers Racing	Chevrolet	20.904	—	—
32	1	Travis Kvapil	Beaver Motorsports	Chevrolet	20.646	—	—
Did not qualify
33	9	Codie Rohrbaugh	Grant County Mulch Racing	Chevrolet	20.135	—	—
34	63	Dawson Cram	Copp Motorsports	Chevrolet	20.398	—	—
35	10	Juan Manuel González	Jennifer Jo Cobb Racing	Chevrolet	20.541	—	—
36	49	Ray Ciccarelli	CMI Motorsports	Chevrolet	20.639	—	—
37	6	Norm Benning	Norm Benning Racing	Chevrolet	21.106	—	—
38	43	Tony Mrakovich	Tony Mrakovich Racing	Chevrolet	0.000	—	—

== Race ==
=== Stage Results ===
Stage One Laps: 70

Pos	No	Driver	Team	Manufacturer	Points
1	51	Kyle Busch (i)	Kyle Busch Motorsports	Toyota	0
2	52	Stewart Friesen	Halmar Friesen Racing	Chevrolet	9
3	13	Johnny Sauter	ThorSport Racing	Ford	8
4	4	Todd Gilliland	Kyle Busch Motorsports	Toyota	7
5	45	Ross Chastain (i)	Niece Motorsports	Chevrolet	0
6	88	Matt Crafton	ThorSport Racing	Ford	5
7	24	Brett Moffitt	GMS Racing	Chevrolet	4
8	16	Austin Hill	Hattori Racing Enterprises	Toyota	3
9	8	Austin Dillon (i)	NEMCO Motorsports	Chevrolet	0
10	46	Raphaël Lessard	Kyle Busch Motorsports	Toyota	1

Stage Two Laps: 70

Pos	No	Driver	Team	Manufacturer	Points
1	45	Ross Chastain (i)	Niece Motorsports	Chevrolet	0
2	99	Ben Rhodes	ThorSport Racing	Ford	9
3	51	Kyle Busch (i)	Kyle Busch Motorsports	Toyota	0
4	52	Stewart Friesen	Halmar Friesen Racing	Chevrolet	7
5	24	Brett Moffitt	GMS Racing	Chevrolet	6
6	18	Harrison Burton (R)	Kyle Busch Motorsports	Toyota	5
7	13	Johnny Sauter	ThorSport Racing	Ford	4
8	16	Austin Hill	Hattori Racing Enterprises	Toyota	3
9	27	Myatt Snider	ThorSport Racing	Ford	2
10	4	Todd Gilliland	Kyle Busch Motorsports	Toyota	1

=== Final Stage Results ===
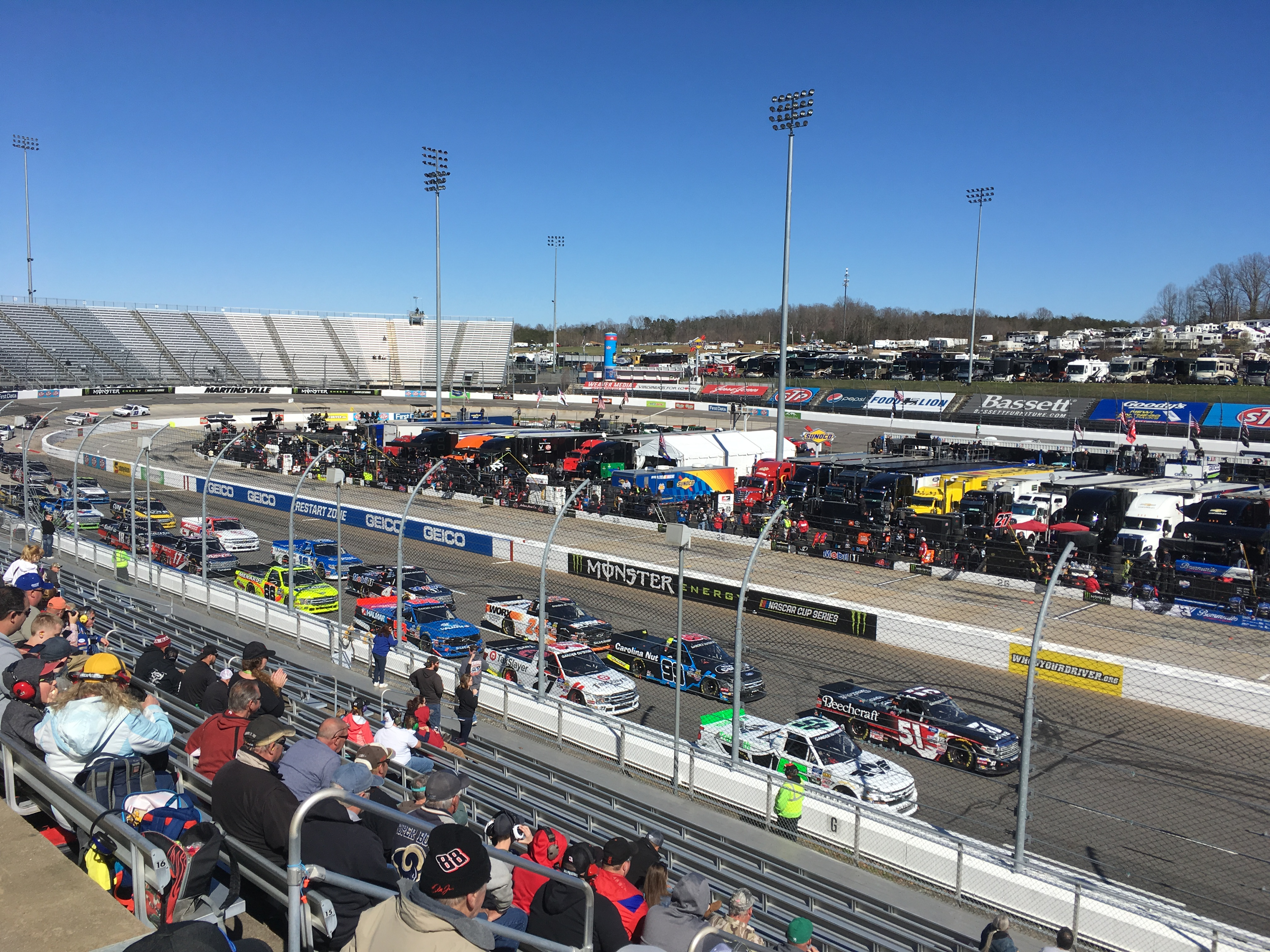
Kyle Busch leads the field following a restart

Stage Three Laps: 110

Pos	Grid	No	Driver	Team	Manufacturer	Laps	Points
1	2	51	Kyle Busch (i)	Kyle Busch Motorsports	Toyota	250	0
2	16	99	Ben Rhodes	ThorSport Racing	Ford	250	44
3	5	24	Brett Moffitt	GMS Racing	Chevrolet	250	44
4	10	45	Ross Chastain (i)	Niece Motorsports	Chevrolet	250	0
5	1	52	Stewart Friesen	Halmar Friesen Racing	Chevrolet	250	48
6	15	27	Myatt Snider	ThorSport Racing	Ford	250	33
7	19	98	Grant Enfinger	ThorSport Racing	Ford	250	30
8	6	88	Matt Crafton	ThorSport Racing	Ford	250	34
9	8	13	Johnny Sauter	ThorSport Racing	Ford	250	40
10	13	22	Bubba Wallace (i)	AM Racing	Chevrolet	250	0
11	18	18	Harrison Burton (R)	Kyle Busch Motorsports	Toyota	250	31
12	21	54	David Gilliland	DGR-Crosley	Toyota	250	25
13	12	8	Austin Dillon (i)	NEMCO Motorsports	Chevrolet	250	0
14	7	46	Raphaël Lessard	Kyle Busch Motorsports	Toyota	250	24
15	3	4	Todd Gilliland	Kyle Busch Motorsports	Toyota	250	30
16	9	16	Austin Hill	Hattori Racing Enterprises	Toyota	250	27
17	4	2	Sheldon Creed (R)	GMS Racing	Chevrolet	250	20
18	11	19	Derek Kraus	Bill McAnally Racing	Toyota	250	19
19	14	17	Tyler Ankrum (R)	DGR-Crosley	Toyota	250	18
20	24	11	Spencer Davis	Rette Jones Racing	Ford	249	17
21	23	56	Timmy Hill (i)	Hill Motorsports	Chevrolet	249	0
22	26	92	Austin Theriault	RBR Enterprises	Ford	248	15
23	20	02	Tyler Dippel (R)	Young's Motorsports	Chevrolet	248	14
24	27	44	Reid Wilson	Niece Motorsports	Chevrolet	247	13
25	30	7	Korbin Forrister	All Out Motorsports	Toyota	246	12
26	29	3	Jordan Anderson	Jordan Anderson Racing	Chevrolet	246	11
27	25	20	Spencer Boyd (R)	Young's Motorsports	Chevrolet	244	10
28	32	1	Travis Kvapil	Beaver Motorsports	Chevrolet	240	9
29	28	30	Brennan Poole (R)	On Point Motorsports	Toyota	239	8
30	31	33	Daniel Sasnett	Reaume Brothers Racing	Chevrolet	238	7
31	22	04	Cory Roper	Roper Racing	Ford	225	6
32	17	12	Gus Dean (R)	Young's Motorsports	Chevrolet	61	5

Previous race: 2019 Strat 200	NASCAR Gander Outdoors Truck Series; 2019 season	Next race: 2019 Vankor 350
