= 2019 M&M's 200 =

2019 NASCAR Gander Outdoors Truck Series

Race details
- Race 10 of 23 in the 2019 NASCAR Gander Outdoors Truck Series season
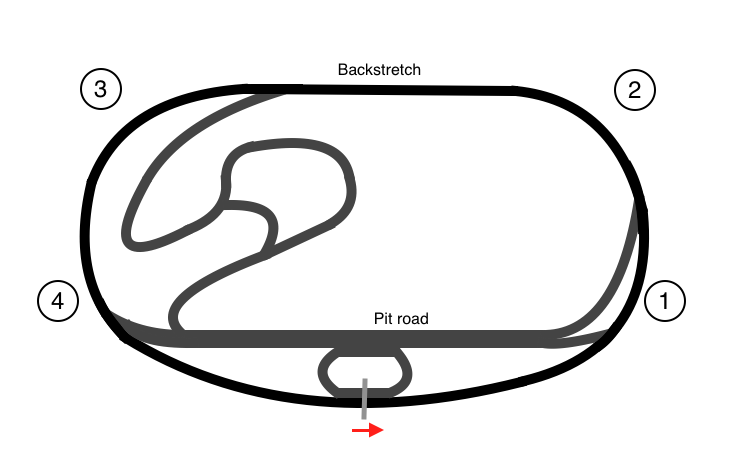
- Date: June 16, 2019
- Location: Iowa Speedway in Newton, Iowa
- Course: Permanent racing facility
- Course length: 0.875 miles (1.408 km)
- Distance: 200 laps, 175 mi (281.635 km)

Pole position
| Driver | Chandler Smith | Kyle Busch Motorsports |
- Time: N/A

Most laps led
| Driver | Ross Chastain | Niece Motorsports |
- Laps: 141

Winner
| No. 24 | Brett Moffitt | GMS Racing |

Television in the United States
- Network: FS1

Radio in the United States
- Radio: MRN

The 2019 M&M's 200 is a NASCAR Gander Outdoors Truck Series race held on June 16, 2019, at Iowa Speedway in Newton, Iowa. Contested over 200 laps on the 0.875-mile (1.408 km) D-shaped oval, it was the 10th race of the 2019 NASCAR Gander Outdoors Truck Series season. The race was postponed from Saturday, June 15 to Sunday, June 16 due to rain.

== Background ==
=== Track ===
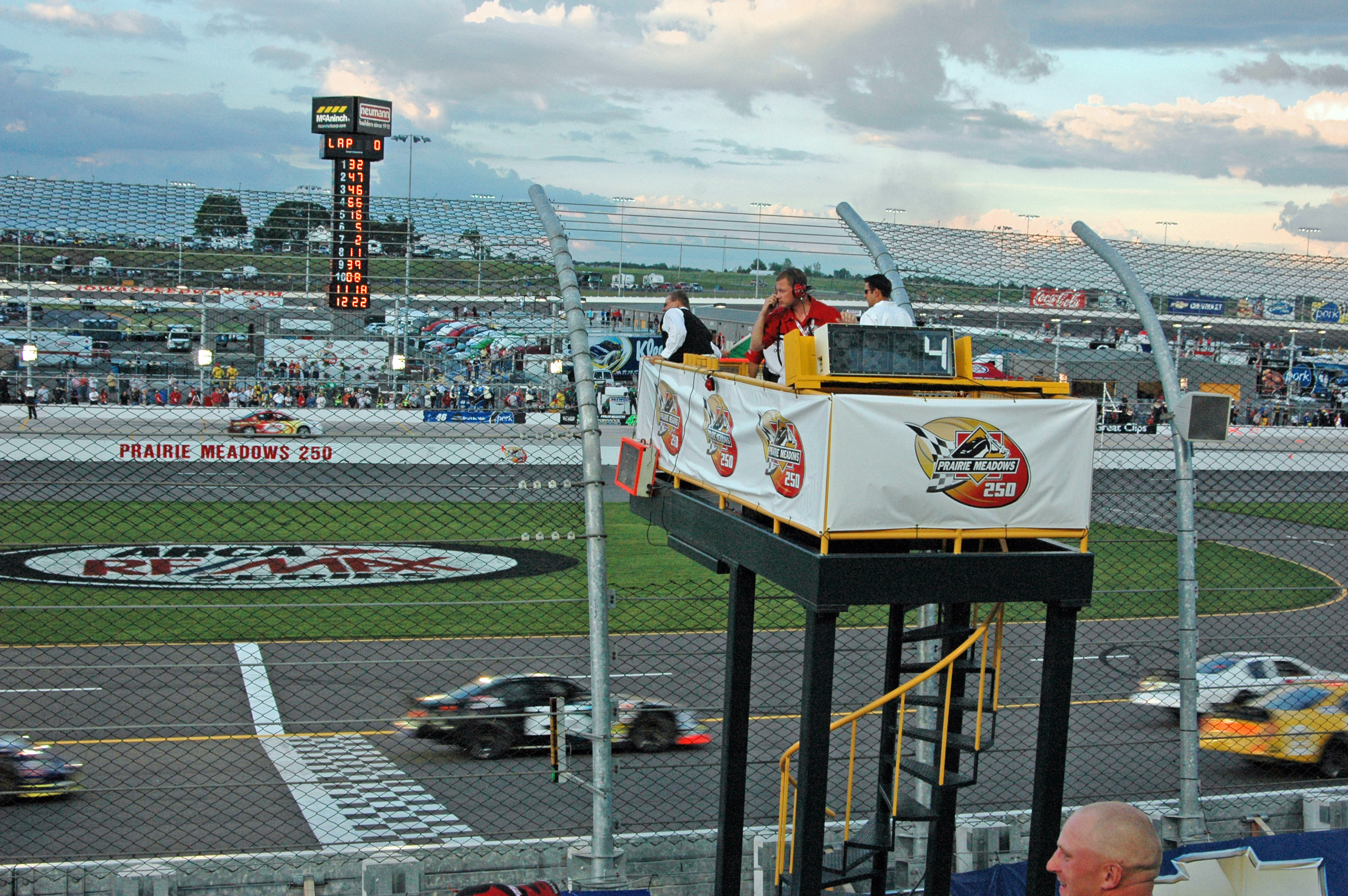
Flagstand of Iowa Speedway in June 2007, the track where the race was held.

Iowa Speedway is a 7/8-mile (1.4 km) paved oval motor racing track in Newton, Iowa, United States, approximately 30 miles (48 km) east of Des Moines. The track was designed with influence from Rusty Wallace and patterned after Richmond Raceway, a short track where Wallace was very successful. It has over 25,000 permanent seats as well as a unique multi-tiered Recreational Vehicle viewing area along the backstretch.

== Entry list ==
| No. | Driver | Team | Manufacturer |
|---|---|---|---|
| 0 | Jennifer Jo Cobb | Jennifer Jo Cobb Racing | Chevrolet |
| 02 | Tyler Dippel (R) | Young's Motorsports | Chevrolet |
| 2 | Sheldon Creed (R) | GMS Racing | Chevrolet |
| 3 | Jordan Anderson | Jordan Anderson Racing | Chevrolet |
| 4 | Todd Gilliland | Kyle Busch Motorsports | Toyota |
| 6 | Norm Benning | Norm Benning Racing | Chevrolet |
| 8 | Trey Hutchens | NEMCO Motorsports | Chevrolet |
| 10 | Juan Manuel González | Jennifer Jo Cobb Racing | Chevrolet |
| 12 | Gus Dean (R) | Young's Motorsports | Chevrolet |
| 13 | Johnny Sauter | ThorSport Racing | Ford |
| 16 | Austin Hill | Hattori Racing Enterprises | Toyota |
| 17 | Raphaël Lessard | DGR-Crosley | Toyota |
| 18 | Harrison Burton (R) | Kyle Busch Motorsports | Toyota |
| 20 | Spencer Boyd (R) | Young's Motorsports | Chevrolet |
| 22 | Austin Wayne Self | AM Racing | Chevrolet |
| 24 | Brett Moffitt | GMS Racing | Chevrolet |
| 30 | Brennan Poole (R) | On Point Motorsports | Toyota |
| 33 | C. J. McLaughlin | Reaume Brothers Racing | Chevrolet |
| 34 | Mason Massey | Reaume Brothers Racing | Chevrolet |
| 42 | Chad Finley | Chad Finley Racing | Chevrolet |
| 44 | Ross Chastain | Niece Motorsports | Chevrolet |
| 45 | Kyle Benjamin | Niece Motorsports | Chevrolet |
| 46 | Riley Herbst | Kyle Busch Motorsports | Toyota |
| 51 | Chandler Smith | Kyle Busch Motorsports | Toyota |
| 52 | Stewart Friesen | Halmar Friesen Racing | Chevrolet |
| 54 | Natalie Decker (R) | DGR-Crosley | Toyota |
| 56 | Tyler Hill | Hill Motorsports | Chevrolet |
| 87 | Tyler Ankrum (R) | NEMCO Motorsports | Chevrolet |
| 88 | Matt Crafton | ThorSport Racing | Ford |
| 97 | Jesse Little | JJL Motorsports | Ford |
| 98 | Grant Enfinger | ThorSport Racing | Ford |
| 99 | Ben Rhodes | ThorSport Racing | Ford |

== Practice ==
=== First practice ===
Chandler Smith was the fastest in the first practice session with a time of 23.154 seconds and a speed of 136.046 mph (218.945 km/h).

| Pos | No. | Driver | Team | Manufacturer | Time | Speed |
|---|---|---|---|---|---|---|
| 1 | 51 | Chandler Smith | Kyle Busch Motorsports | Toyota | 23.154 | 136.046 |
| 2 | 24 | Brett Moffitt | GMS Racing | Chevrolet | 23.419 | 134.506 |
| 3 | 17 | Raphaël Lessard | DGR-Crosley | Toyota | 23.441 | 134.380 |

=== Final practice ===
Sheldon Creed was the fastest in the final practice session with a time of 23.458 seconds and a speed of 134.283 mph (216.108 km/h).

| Pos | No. | Driver | Team | Manufacturer | Time | Speed |
|---|---|---|---|---|---|---|
| 1 | 2 | Sheldon Creed (R) | GMS Racing | Chevrolet | 23.458 | 134.283 |
| 2 | 17 | Raphaël Lessard | DGR-Crosley | Toyota | 23.580 | 133.588 |
| 3 | 16 | Austin Hill | Hattori Racing Enterprises | Toyota | 23.605 | 133.446 |

== Qualifying ==
Qualifying was cancelled due to rain. Chandler Smith won the pole based on owner's points.

=== Qualifying results ===
| Pos | No | Driver | Team | Manufacturer | Time |
|---|---|---|---|---|---|
| 1 | 51 | Chandler Smith | Kyle Busch Motorsports | Toyota | 0.000 |
| 2 | 98 | Grant Enfinger | ThorSport Racing | Ford | 0.000 |
| 3 | 52 | Stewart Friesen | Halmar Friesen Racing | Chevrolet | 0.000 |
| 4 | 88 | Matt Crafton | ThorSport Racing | Ford | 0.000 |
| 5 | 45 | Kyle Benjamin | Niece Motorsports | Chevrolet | 0.000 |
| 6 | 24 | Brett Moffitt | GMS Racing | Chevrolet | 0.000 |
| 7 | 99 | Ben Rhodes | ThorSport Racing | Ford | 0.000 |
| 8 | 13 | Johnny Sauter | ThorSport Racing | Ford | 0.000 |
| 9 | 16 | Austin Hill | Hattori Racing Enterprises | Toyota | 0.000 |
| 10 | 18 | Harrison Burton (R) | Kyle Busch Motorsports | Toyota | 0.000 |
| 11 | 4 | Todd Gilliland | Kyle Busch Motorsports | Toyota | 0.000 |
| 12 | 2 | Sheldon Creed (R) | GMS Racing | Chevrolet | 0.000 |
| 13 | 17 | Raphaël Lessard | DGR-Crosley | Toyota | 0.000 |
| 14 | 02 | Tyler Dippel (R) | Young's Motorsports | Chevrolet | 0.000 |
| 15 | 30 | Brennan Poole (R) | On Point Motorsports | Toyota | 0.000 |
| 16 | 22 | Austin Wayne Self | AM Racing | Chevrolet | 0.000 |
| 17 | 3 | Jordan Anderson | Jordan Anderson Racing | Chevrolet | 0.000 |
| 18 | 20 | Spencer Boyd (R) | Young's Motorsports | Chevrolet | 0.000 |
| 19 | 44 | Ross Chastain | Niece Motorsports | Chevrolet | 0.000 |
| 20 | 8 | Trey Hutchens | NEMCO Motorsports | Chevrolet | 0.000 |
| 21 | 33 | C. J. McLaughlin | Reaume Brothers Racing | Chevrolet | 0.000 |
| 22 | 12 | Gus Dean (R) | Young's Motorsports | Chevrolet | 0.000 |
| 23 | 54 | Natalie Decker (R) | DGR-Crosley | Toyota | 0.000 |
| 24 | 34 | Mason Massey | Reaume Brothers Racing | Chevrolet | 0.000 |
| 25 | 97 | Jesse Little | JJL Motorsports | Ford | 0.000 |
| 26 | 46 | Riley Herbst | Kyle Busch Motorsports | Toyota | 0.000 |
| 27 | 42 | Chad Finley | Chad Finley Racing | Chevrolet | 0.000 |
| 28 | 10 | Juan Manuel González | Jennifer Jo Cobb Racing | Chevrolet | 0.000 |
| 29 | 6 | Norm Benning | Norm Benning Racing | Chevrolet | 0.000 |
| 30 | 56 | Tyler Hill | Hill Motorsports | Chevrolet | 0.000 |
| 31 | 87 | Tyler Ankrum (R) | NEMCO Motorsports | Chevrolet | 0.000 |
| 32 | 0 | Jennifer Jo Cobb | Jennifer Jo Cobb Racing | Chevrolet | 0.000 |

== Race ==
=== Summary ===
Chandler Smith started on pole and led the race up until a caution shortly before the end of Stage 1, which was won by Ross Chastain after he got off pit road quickly. Chastain continued his dominating lead, also winning Stage 2.

In the final stage, Austin Hill and Johnny Sauter tangled several times, causing damage to Sauter's truck. Sauter then purposely drove into Hill under caution in retaliation, causing NASCAR to park him for his actions. Sauter would miss the following week's race due to these actions.

Chastain held a comfortable lead over the rest of the field, winning the race with a two-second lead over Brett Moffitt. After the race, NASCAR disqualified Chastain and stripped him of his race win and both stage wins as his truck failed post-race inspection for being too low. This then gave the win to Moffitt, despite him not leading a single lap of the race.

=== Stage Results ===
Stage One Laps: 60

| Pos | No | Driver | Team | Manufacturer | Points |
|---|---|---|---|---|---|
| 1 | 88 | Matt Crafton | ThorSport Racing | Ford | 10 |
| 2 | 98 | Grant Enfinger | ThorSport Racing | Ford | 9 |
| 3 | 13 | Johnny Sauter | ThorSport Racing | Ford | 8 |
| 4 | 99 | Ben Rhodes | ThorSport Racing | Ford | 7 |
| 5 | 2 | Sheldon Creed (R) | GMS Racing | Chevrolet | 6 |
| 6 | 24 | Brett Moffitt | GMS Racing | Chevrolet | 5 |
| 7 | 16 | Austin Hill | Hattori Racing Enterprises | Toyota | 4 |
| 8 | 18 | Harrison Burton (R) | Kyle Busch Motorsports | Toyota | 3 |
| 9 | 97 | Jesse Little | JJL Motorsports | Ford | 2 |
| 10 | 52 | Stewart Friesen | Halmar Friesen Racing | Chevrolet | 1 |

Stage Two Laps: 60

| Pos | No | Driver | Team | Manufacturer | Points |
|---|---|---|---|---|---|
| 1 | 99 | Ben Rhodes | ThorSport Racing | Ford | 10 |
| 2 | 24 | Brett Moffitt | GMS Racing | Chevrolet | 9 |
| 3 | 98 | Grant Enfinger | ThorSport Racing | Ford | 8 |
| 4 | 51 | Chandler Smith | Kyle Busch Motorsports | Toyota | 7 |
| 5 | 18 | Harrison Burton (R) | Kyle Busch Motorsports | Toyota | 6 |
| 6 | 52 | Stewart Friesen | Halmar Friesen Racing | Chevrolet | 5 |
| 7 | 88 | Matt Crafton | ThorSport Racing | Ford | 4 |
| 8 | 16 | Austin Hill | Hattori Racing Enterprises | Toyota | 3 |
| 9 | 2 | Sheldon Creed (R) | GMS Racing | Chevrolet | 2 |
| 10 | 13 | Johnny Sauter | ThorSport Racing | Ford | 1 |

=== Final Stage Results ===
Stage Three Laps: 80

| Pos | Grid | No | Driver | Team | Manufacturer | Laps | Points |
|---|---|---|---|---|---|---|---|
| 1 | 6 | 24 | Brett Moffitt | GMS Racing | Chevrolet | 200 | 54 |
| 2 | 7 | 99 | Ben Rhodes | ThorSport Racing | Ford | 200 | 52 |
| 3 | 10 | 18 | Harrison Burton (R) | Kyle Busch Motorsports | Toyota | 200 | 43 |
| 4 | 2 | 98 | Grant Enfinger | ThorSport Racing | Ford | 200 | 50 |
| 5 | 3 | 52 | Stewart Friesen | Halmar Friesen Racing | Chevrolet | 200 | 38 |
| 6 | 12 | 2 | Sheldon Creed (R) | GMS Racing | Chevrolet | 200 | 39 |
| 7 | 4 | 88 | Matt Crafton | ThorSport Racing | Ford | 200 | 44 |
| 8 | 1 | 51 | Chandler Smith | Kyle Busch Motorsports | Toyota | 200 | 36 |
| 9 | 13 | 17 | Raphaël Lessard | DGR-Crosley | Toyota | 200 | 28 |
| 10 | 11 | 4 | Todd Gilliland | Kyle Busch Motorsports | Toyota | 200 | 27 |
| 11 | 15 | 30 | Brennan Poole (R) | On Point Motorsports | Toyota | 200 | 26 |
| 12 | 9 | 16 | Austin Hill | Hattori Racing Enterprises | Toyota | 200 | 32 |
| 13 | 5 | 45 | Kyle Benjamin | Niece Motorsports | Chevrolet | 199 | 24 |
| 14 | 16 | 22 | Austin Wayne Self | AM Racing | Chevrolet | 199 | 23 |
| 15 | 26 | 46 | Riley Herbst | Kyle Busch Motorsports | Toyota | 199 | 22 |
| 16 | 18 | 20 | Spencer Boyd (R) | Young's Motorsports | Chevrolet | 198 | 21 |
| 17 | 23 | 54 | Natalie Decker (R) | DGR-Crosley | Toyota | 198 | 20 |
| 18 | 17 | 3 | Jordan Anderson | Jordan Anderson Racing | Chevrolet | 198 | 19 |
| 19 | 14 | 02 | Tyler Dippel (R) | Young's Motorsports | Chevrolet | 197 | 18 |
| 20 | 22 | 12 | Gus Dean (R) | Young's Motorsports | Chevrolet | 197 | 17 |
| 21 | 24 | 34 | Mason Massey | Reaume Brothers Racing | Chevrolet | 196 | 16 |
| 22 | 25 | 97 | Jesse Little | JJL Motorsports | Ford | 194 | 17 |
| 23 | 21 | 33 | C. J. McLaughlin | Reaume Brothers Racing | Chevrolet | 189 | 14 |
| 24 | 29 | 6 | Norm Benning | Norm Benning Racing | Chevrolet | 186 | 13 |
| 25 | 32 | 0 | Jennifer Jo Cobb | Jennifer Jo Cobb Racing | Chevrolet | 183 | 12 |
| 26 | 30 | 56 | Tyler Hill | Hill Motorsports | Chevrolet | 179 | 11 |
| 27 | 8 | 13 | Johnny Sauter | ThorSport Racing | Ford | 137 | 19 |
| 28 | 27 | 42 | Chad Finley | Chad Finley Racing | Chevrolet | 68 | 9 |
| 29 | 20 | 8 | Trey Hutchens | NEMCO Motorsports | Chevrolet | 61 | 8 |
| 30 | 28 | 10 | Juan Manuel González | Jennifer Jo Cobb Racing | Chevrolet | 40 | 7 |
| 31 | 31 | 87 | Tyler Ankrum (R) | NEMCO Motorsports | Chevrolet | 17 | 6 |
| 32 | 19 | 44 | Ross Chastain | Niece Motorsports | Chevrolet | 200 | 5 |

== After the race ==
Chastain and Niece Motorsports appealed NASCAR's decision to disqualify them, as they stated that the height of Chastain's truck was not an intentional adjustment and it didn't give him an advantage. They also believed the truck's height was the result of minor damage sustained when the race began. The penalty was eventually sustained.

The following week, NASCAR took action against Johnny Sauter for his actions in intentionally wrecking Hill under caution. They issued a 1-race suspension. Under normal circumstances this would mean that Sauter would not compete for the championship that season. However, NASCAR, feeling like stripping playoffs eligibility from Sauter was too harsh, granted Sauter a waiver, allowing him to still make the playoffs if he won a race in the regular season and made the top-30 in driver's points.

| Previous race: 2019 SpeedyCash.com 400 | NASCAR Gander Outdoors Truck Series; 2019 season | Next race: 2019 CarShield 200 |
