= 2015 NASCAR K&N Pro Series East =

NASCAR season

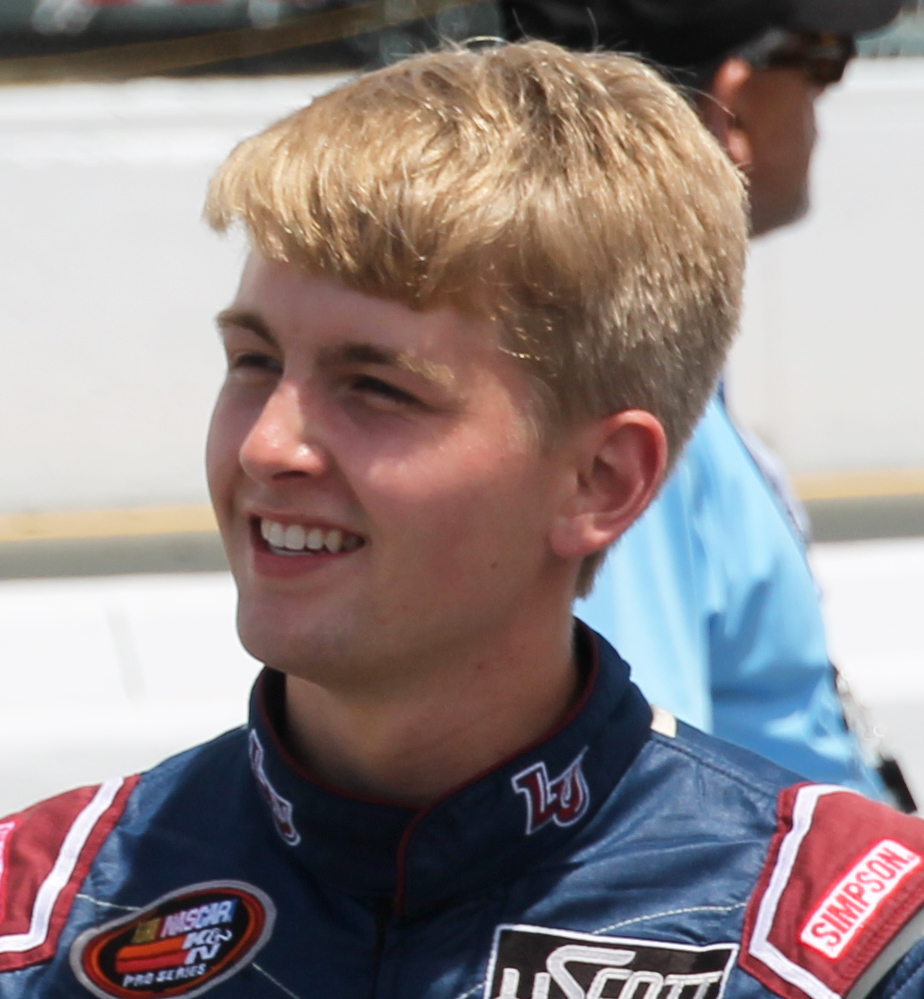
William Byron, the 2015 K&N Pro Series East champion.

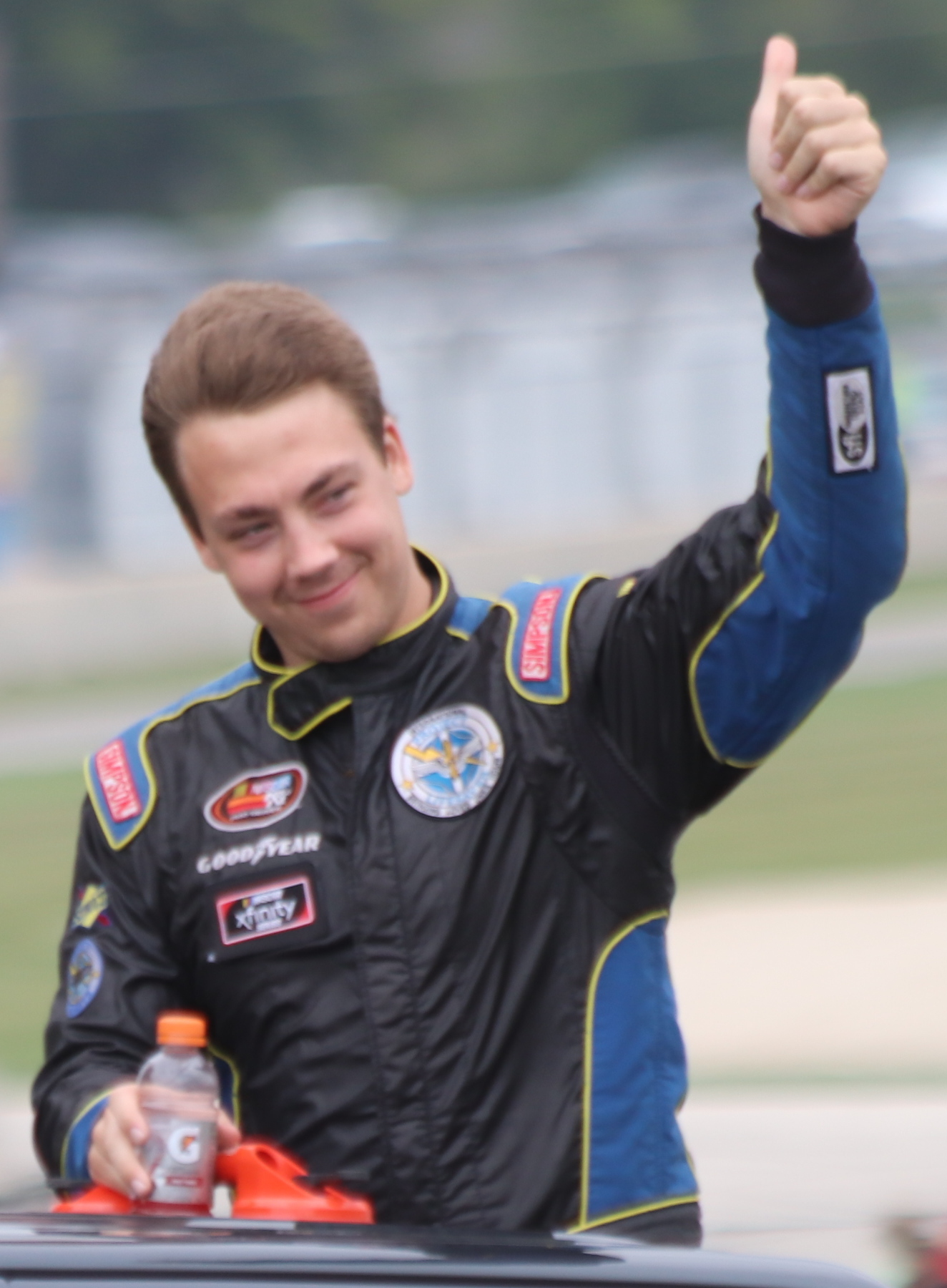
Scott Heckert finished second behind Byron by 15 points.

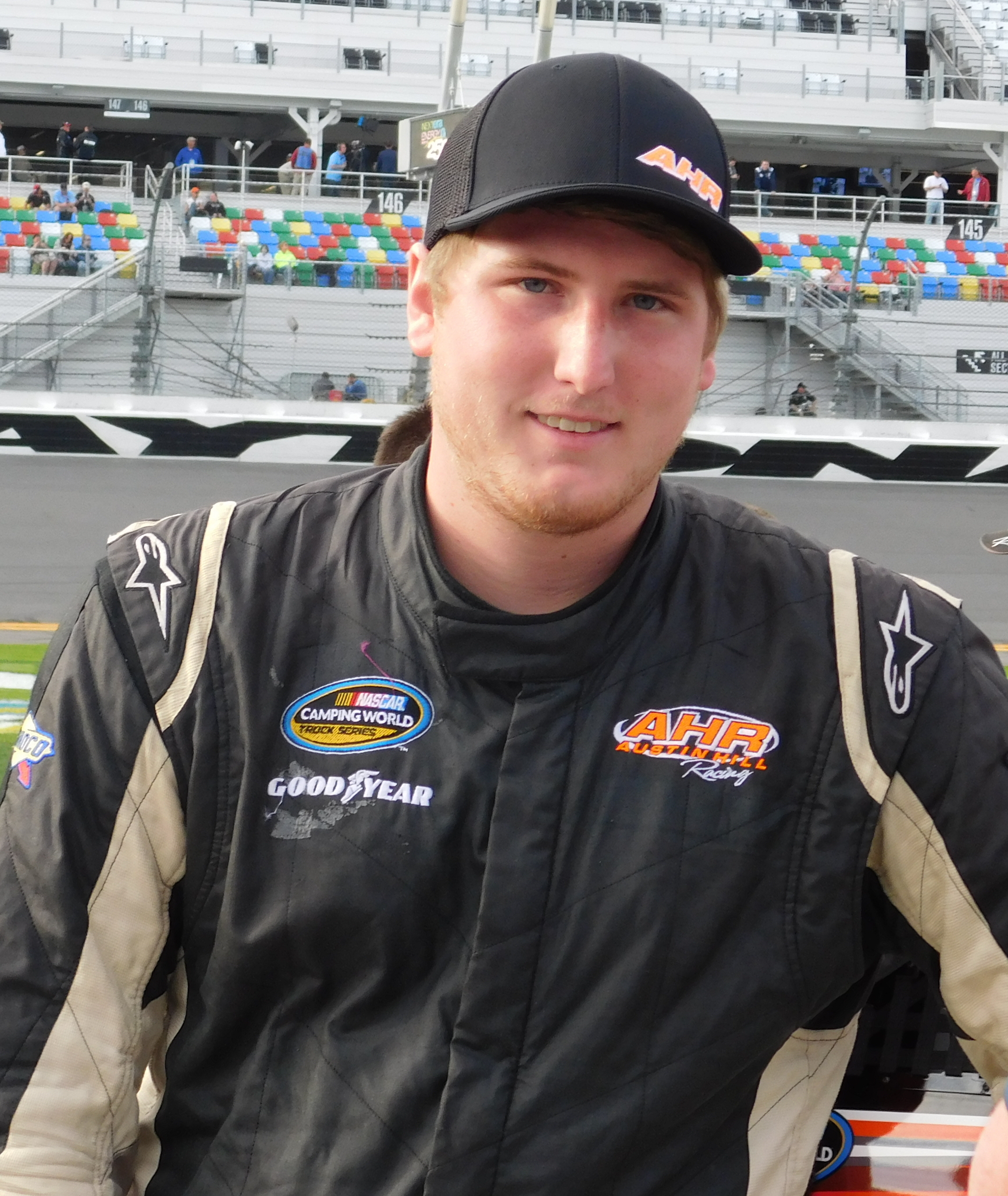
Austin Hill finished third in the championship.

The 2015 NASCAR K&N Pro Series East is the 29th season of the K&N Pro Series East. It began with the Hart to Heart Breast Cancer Foundation 150 at New Smyrna Speedway on February 15 and ended with the Drive Sober 125 at Dover International Speedway on October 3. Ben Rhodes enters the season as the defending Drivers' Champion. William Byron won the championship, fifteen points in front of Scott Heckert. All of the races in the 2015 season were televised on NBCSN on a tape delay basis.

== Drivers ==
No.	Manufacturer	Car Owner	Race Driver	Crew Chief
00	Toyota	Bill McAnally	Cole Custer 1	Matthew Goslant
1	Toyota	Shigeaki Hattori	Sergio Peña 1	Scott Goyer
1	Toyota	Shigeaki Hattori	Mason Mitchell (R) 1	Jamie Jones
1	Toyota	Shigeaki Hattori	Jesse Little 2	Jamie Jones
1	Toyota	Shigeaki Hattori	Brandon McReynolds 1	Bobby Burrell
02	Chevrolet	Tony Blanchard	Sarah Cornett-Ching (R) 2	Tony Blanchard
2	Toyota	Jennifer Satterfield	Collin Cabre (R)	Matt Bucher
3	Toyota	Ben Kennedy	Kaz Grala	Mike Fritts
04	Ford	Ronnie Bassett	Ronnie Bassett Jr. 12	Jerry Babb
4	Toyota	Max Siegel	Kenzie Ruston	Mark Green
5	Chevrolet	Harry Scott Jr.	Justin Haley (R)	Mark McFarland
6	Toyota	Max Siegel	Devon Amos (R) (Note: At the Casey's General Store 150 at Iowa, NASCAR regulations state when an East team and a West team use the same car number, the team that qualifies faster will be able to retain their number. East Series drivers who had to change numbers after qualifying: Devon Amos drove car number 66, instead of his regular car number 6, while Trey Hutchens drove car number 23, instead of his regular car number 14 and David Garbo Jr. drove car number 36, instead of his regular car number 31.) (Note: At #ThanksKenny 150 at Iowa, NASCAR regulations state when an East team and a West team use the same car number, the team that qualifies faster will be able to retain their number. East Series drivers who had to change numbers after qualifying: Devon Amos drove car number 66, instead of his regular car number 6, while Trey Hutchens drove car number 23, instead of his regular car number 14. Kyle Benjamin drove car number 72, instead of car number 27, and David Garbo Jr. drove car number 36, instead of his regular car number 31.)	Jon Wolfe
7	Chevrolet 6	Larry Berg	Codie Rohrbaugh (R) 6	Mark Huff
7	Ford 1	Jerry Pitts	Noah Gragson (R) 1	Jerry Pitts
08	Ford	Paul Green	Tyler Hughes (R) 4	Paul Green
09	Toyota 1	Rodrigo San Martin	Christian Celaya (R) 6	Tony Ponkauskas
09	Chevrolet 4	Rodrigo San Martin	Christian Celaya (R) 6	Tony Ponkauskas
9	Chevrolet	Justin Marks	William Byron (R)	Kevin Bellicourt
12	Toyota	Rick Gdovic	Gray Gaulding 7	Charles Denike III
12	Toyota	Rick Gdovic	Brandon Gdovic 1	Charles Denike III
12	Toyota	Rick Gdovic	Corey LaJoie 1	Charles Denike III
13	Toyota	Kelly Souza	Todd Souza 1	Michael Munoz
14	Chevrolet	Bobby Hutchens	Trey Hutchens 6	Bobby Hutchens Jr.
15	Toyota	Bill McAnally	Nick Drake	David McCarty
17	Toyota	James Finchum	Chad Finchum 1	Binky Torbett
18	Toyota	Shayne Lockhart	Peyton Sellers 2	Hoyt Overbagh
18	Toyota	Shayne Lockhart	Sarah Cornett-Ching (R) 1	Shayne Lockhart
18	Toyota	Shayne Lockhart	Justin LaDuke (R) 1	Shayne Lockhart
18	Toyota	Shayne Lockhart	Sam Hunt 2	Peyton Sellers
19	Chevrolet	Chuck Buchanan	Chuck Buchanan Jr. 4	Craig Wood
20	Chevrolet	Bob Newberry	Gray Gaulding 1	Ryan McKinney
20	Chevrolet	Bob Newberry	Daniel Hemric 3	Doug Howe
20	Chevrolet	Bob Newberry	Spencer Davis (R) 4	Doug Howe
22	Ford	Bryan Hill	Austin Hill	Mike Abner
23	Chevrolet	J. P. Morgan	J.P. Morgan (R) 5	James Beck
27	Ford	Steven Benjamin	Kyle Benjamin (R) 13	Kevin Reed
28	Toyota	Ernie Irvan	Jared Irvan (R) 1	Mark Reno
30	Ford	Mark Rette	Grant Quinlan (R) 3	Mark Rette
31	Chevrolet	Ted Marsh	David Garbo Jr. (R)	Todd Fisette
32	Chevrolet	Dale Quarterley	Dale Quarterley 1	Teddy Brown
33	Chevrolet	Bob Newberry	Brandon Jones 2	Chris Rice
34	Chevrolet	Justin Marks	Scott Heckert	Fuz Burgdoff
36	Chevrolet	Linda Marsh	Dalton Zehr (R) 1	Todd Fisette
36	Chevrolet	Linda Marsh	Anthony Kumpen (R) 1	Robert Russell Jr.
37	Chevrolet	Jeff Spraker	Kevin O'Connell 1	Scott Goyer
37	Chevrolet	Jeff Spraker	Mike Senica (R) 1	Scott Goyer
37	Chevrolet	Jeff Spraker	Clair Zimmerman (R) 1	Yogan Yiengst
39	Chevrolet	Eric McClure	Chad Finchum 2	Chris Carrier
40	Chevrolet	Michael Hillman	Travis Miller 8	Pat Tryson
40	Chevrolet	Michael Hillman	Brian Wong 1	Doug Chouinard
41	Chevrolet	Douglas Fuller	Ryan Preece (R) 1	Paul Clapprood
41	Chevrolet	Douglas Fuller	Landon Cassill 1	Mark Hillman
42	Toyota	Max Siegel	Jay Beasley 11	Clyde Eyler
42	Toyota	Max Siegel	Sergio Peña 3	Clyde Eyler
44	Ford	Ronnie Bassett	Dillon Bassett (R) 12	Ron Otto
45	Chevrolet	John Stange	Christian Celaya (R) 6	James Heuberger
45	Chevrolet	Ashley Stange	Mike Senica (R) 1	James Heuberger
47	Chevrolet	Ashley Stange	Mike Senica (R) 3	Bob White
49	Toyota 2	Zeno Marshall Jr.	John Holleman IV (R) 4	Rock Harris
49	Chevrolet 2	Zeno Marshall Jr.	John Holleman IV (R) 4	Rock Harris
50	Chevrolet	Zeb Pixley	Zeb Pixley (R) 1	Craig Wood
51	Chevrolet	Harry Scott Jr.	Dalton Sargeant (R)	Kris Bowen
53	Ford	Robert Torriere	Marc-Antoine Camirand (R) 1	Jim Kilmer
55	Ford	Dione Jefferson	Dylan Lupton 1	Jeff Jefferson
55	Ford	Jerry Pits	Noah Gragson (R) 1	Jerry Pits
56	Chevrolet	Charles Dean	Gus Dean (R) 1	Franklin Hinson II
57	Chevrolet	Thomas Oakley	Brandon Oakley (R) 1	Gary Estes
63	Dodge 1	Joe Salemi	Brandon Glover (R) 1	Joe Salemi
63	Toyota 1	Joe Salemi	John Salemi 1	Kevin Salemi
71	Chevrolet	Rob Grimm	Eddie MacDonald 5	Rollie Lachance Jr.
72	Ford	Jeff Jefferson	Gracin Raz (R) 1	Jeff Jefferson
79	Chevrolet	Sandra Marshall	Steven Berrier (R) 1	Rock Harris
81	Chevrolet	Michael Burns	Jeremy Burns 1	Mike Burns
91	Toyota	Terry Carroll	Justin Carroll (R) 2	Charles Denike III
94	Chevrolet	Jim Hoffman	Dylan Hoffman (R) 4	Jim Hoffman
97	Toyota	Jason Little	Jesse Little 4	Steve Graham
98	Chevrolet	Mike Curb	Rico Abreu (R)	Mardy Lindley
99	Toyota	Bill McAnally	Anthony Kumpen (R) 1	Roger Bracken
99	Toyota	Bill McAnally	Eddie Cheever III (R) 1	Roger Bracken
99	Toyota	Bill McAnally	Patrick Staropoli (R) 2	Matthew Goslant

== Schedule ==
All of the races in the 2015 season were televised on NBCSN on a tape delay basis.

No.	Race title	Track	Date
1	The Hart to Heart Breast Cancer Foundation 150	New Smyrna Speedway, New Smyrna Beach, Florida	February 15
2	Kevin Whitaker Chevrolet 150	Greenville-Pickens Speedway, Greenville, South Carolina	April 4
3	PittLite 125	Bristol Motor Speedway, Bristol, Tennessee	April 18
4	Casey's General Store 150 (Note: The Casey's General Store 150 was held as a combined event, with competitors from the K&N Pro Series West competing along with competitors for the K&N Pro Series East. The race was run with a series-based point distribution, where drivers received points and statistical credit for their finish relative to other drivers in their series, not to the whole field in general.)	Iowa Speedway, Newton, Iowa	May 16
5	NASCAR Hall of Fame 150	Bowman Gray Stadium, Winston-Salem, North Carolina	May 30
6	Visit Hampton 175	Langley Speedway, Hampton, Virginia	June 20
7	NAPA 150 presented by Germain Toyota	Columbus Motor Speedway, Columbus, Ohio	July 4
8	United Site Services 70	New Hampshire Motor Speedway, Loudon, New Hampshire	July 17
9	#ThanksKenny 150 (Note: The #ThanksKenny 150 was held as a combined event, with competitors from the K&N Pro Series West competing along with competitors for the K&N Pro Series East. The race was run with a series-based point distribution, where drivers received points and statistical credit for their finish relative to other drivers in their series, not to the whole field in general.)	Iowa Speedway, Newton, Iowa	July 31
10	Bully Hill Vineyards 125	Watkins Glen International, Watkins Glen, New York	August 7
11	UPMC Health Plan 150	Motordrome Speedway, Smithton, Pennsylvania	August 15
12	Biscuitville 125	Virginia International Raceway, Danville, Virginia	August 29
13	UNOH 100	Richmond International Raceway, Richmond, Virginia	September 10
14	Drive Sober 125	Dover International Speedway, Dover	October 3 (Note: The Drive Sober 125 was postponed a day because of persistent rain.)

== Results and standings ==
=== Races ===
No.	Race	Pole position	Most laps led	Winning driver	Manufacturer
1	The Hart to Heart Breast Cancer Foundation 150	Austin Hill	Austin Hill	Austin Hill	Ford
2	Kevin Whitaker Chevrolet 150	Daniel Hemric	William Byron	William Byron	Chevrolet
3	PittLite 125	Jesse Little	Kyle Benjamin	Kyle Benjamin	Ford
4	Casey's General Store 150	William Byron	William Byron	William Byron	Chevrolet
5	NASCAR Hall of Fame 150	Scott Heckert	Scott Heckert	Scott Heckert	Chevrolet
6	Visit Hampton 175	Rico Abreu	William Byron	William Byron	Chevrolet
7	NAPA 150 presented by Germain Toyota	Rico Abreu	Rico Abreu	Rico Abreu	Chevrolet
8	United Site Services 70	William Byron	William Byron	William Byron	Chevrolet
9	#ThanksKenny 150	Rico Abreu	Brandon McReynolds	Jesse Little	Toyota
10	Bully Hill Vineyards 125	Cole Custer	Scott Heckert	Scott Heckert	Chevrolet
11	UPMC Health Plan 150	William Byron	William Byron	Dillon Bassett	Ford
12	Biscuitville 125	Scott Heckert	Scott Heckert	Sergio Peña	Toyota
13	UNOH 100	William Byron^{1}	Austin Hill	Austin Hill	Ford
14	Drive Sober 125	William Byron^{2}	Collin Cabre	Collin Cabre	Toyota

Notes

- ^{1} – The qualifying session for the UNOH 100 was cancelled due to heavy rain. The starting line-up was decided by championship points.
- ^{2} – The qualifying session for the Drive Sober 125 was cancelled due to heavy rain. The starting line-up was decided by championship points.

=== Drivers' championship ===
(key) Bold - Pole position awarded by time. Italics - Pole position set by final practice results or rainout. * – Most laps led.

Pos	Driver	NSM	GRE	BRI	IOW	BGS	LGY	COL	NHA	IOW	GLN	MOT	VIR	RCH	DOV	Points
1	William Byron **(R)**	7	1*	2	**2***	15	1*	14	**1***	19	7	**8***	10	6	9	546
2	Scott Heckert	4	25	3	8	**1***	6	15	2	8	1*	4	**15***	4	10	531
3	Austin Hill	**1***	4	7	10	14	10	7	5	26	6	3	6	1*	27	513
4	Dalton Sargeant **(R)**	2	3	26	23	2	3	6	12	13	2	11	9	3	11	506
5	Rico Abreu **(R)**	17	9	10	30	11	**9**	**1***	10	4	12	2	16	11	3	492
6	Justin Haley **(R)**	21	18	9	6	3	20	9	8	7	3	5	5	12	6	491
7	Kaz Grala	18	6	4	29	7	17	3	3	11	15	7	2	8	19	483
8	Nick Drake	8	7	13	18	10	8	11	4	25	11	14	7	28	5	463
9	Kyle Benjamin **(R)**	5	12	1*	9	13	2	16	14	14	14	16		9	16	443
10	Collin Cabre **(R)**	15	15	24	22	17	15	13	24	9	16	17	4	17	1*	424
11	Kenzie Ruston	10	14	27	25	9	12	10	16	34	18	6	14	22	13	408
12	David Garbo Jr. **(R)**	12	13	12	13	19	19	19	20	17	23	21	3	21	26	387
13	Dillon Bassett **(R)**	6	16	18	34	16	13	8	13	15		1		2	31	377
14	Devon Amos **(R)**	23	19	28	31	6	14	12	18	31	19	13	17	29	12	367
15	Ronnie Bassett Jr.	16	8	15	3	12	11	5	25	37		19		24	28	340
16	Jay Beasley	25	20	21	12	4	5	4	26	12	9	INJ	INJ	INJ	21	333
17	Gray Gaulding	3	2	11	36	5	4	17	7							282
18	Christian Celaya **(R)**	19	21		27	21	22	22	23	30		18	11	27	29	280
19	Travis Miller	DNS^{1}	22	14	37				28	24				25	14	186
20	Trey Hutchens			16	14				17	20				7	15	185
21	Jesse Little			**25**	4				11	2	13				30	184
22	Eddie MacDonald			6	19				9					19	2	172
23	Codie Rohrbaugh **(R)**	13		22					19			9		13	17	171
24	Spencer Davis **(R)**								6	3				5	4	159
25	Sergio Peña	9										10	1	31		129
26	J. P. Morgan **(R)**	22	23				18					12		23		122
27	Daniel Hemric		**5**	8							10					109
28	Tyler Hughes **(R)**						16					15		18	20	107
29	John Holleman IV **(R)**	20	17	19		20										100
30	Grant Quinlan **(R)**							2	15					20		96
31	Chuck Buchanan Jr.			23			23						13	30		87
32	Dylan Hoffman **(R)**						24	18	27			20				87
33	Mike Senica **(R)**	Wth	24					20		33				32		79
34	Chad Finchum			17						27					23	74
35	Noah Gragson **(R)**				7^{3}					5^{3}	8			10		70
36	Brandon Jones			5										15		68
37	Sarah Cornett-Ching **(R)**			20				21			24					67
38	Peyton Sellers		10												18	60
39	Justin Carroll **(R)**						7							26		55
40	Anthony Kumpen **(R)**	14							21							53
41	Sam Hunt						21							16		51
42	Dylan Lupton										4					40
43	Cole Custer										**5**					40
44	Corey LaJoie														7	37
45	Mason Mitchell **(R)**					8										36
46	Dale Quarterley												8			36
47	Landon Cassill														8	36
48	Dalton Zehr **(R)**	11														33
49	Jeremy Burns		11													33
50	Brandon Gdovic												12			32
51	Ryan Preece **(R)**													14		30
52	Patrick Staropoli **(R)**													35	24	29
53	Marc-Antoine Camirand **(R)**										17					27
54	Justin LaDuke **(R)**					18										26
55	Zeb Pixley **(R)**												18			26
56	Todd Souza										20					24
57	Kevin O'Connell										21					23
58	John Salemi								22							22
59	Brian Wong										22					22
60	Brandon McReynolds				1^{3}					**1***^{3}					22	22
61	Jared Irvan **(R)**	24														20
62	Eddie Cheever III										DNQ^{2}					19
63	Clair Zimmerman **(R)**														25	19
64	Brandon Glover **(R)**			DNQ^{2}												15
65	Gus Dean **(R)**													33		11
66	Gracin Raz **(R)**				17^{3}					23^{3}				34		10
	Brandon Oakley **(R)**	Wth														0
	Steven Berrier **(R)**					Wth										0
Drivers ineligible for K&N Pro Series East points
	Christopher Bell **(R)**				5											
	James Bickford				24					6						
	Alex Schutte **(R)**				16					10						
	David Mayhew				11					38						
	Chris Eggleston				15					16						
	Ryan Partridge **(R)**				20					18						
	Nicole Behar **(R)**				21					21						
	Johnny White **(R)**				35					22						
	Brett Thompson				26											
	Matt Levin **(R)**				28					28						
	Dylan Caldwell **(R)**									29						
	Ron Norman **(R)**				32					35						
	Rich DeLong III				39					32						
	John Wood				33					36						
	Rob Powers **(R)**				38											
Pos	Driver	NSM	GRE	BRI	IOW	BGS	LGY	COL	NHA	IOW	GLN	MOT	VIR	RCH	DOV	Points

Notes

- ^{1} – Travis Miller received championship points, despite the fact that he did not start the race.
- ^{2} – Brandon Glover and Eddie Cheever III received championship points, despite the fact that they did not qualify for the race.
- ^{3} – Scored points towards the K&N Pro Series West.

== See also ==
- 2015 NASCAR Sprint Cup Series
- 2015 NASCAR Xfinity Series
- 2015 NASCAR Camping World Truck Series
- 2015 NASCAR K&N Pro Series West
- 2015 NASCAR Whelen Modified Tour
- 2015 NASCAR Whelen Southern Modified Tour
- 2015 NASCAR Canadian Tire Series
- 2015 NASCAR Mexico Series
- 2015 NASCAR Whelen Euro Series
