= Robert Pawlowski =

American racing driver

- Born: August 17, 1966 (age 60); Verona, New York, U.S.

ARCA Menards Series career
- 1 race run over 1 year
- Best finish: 70th (2020)
- First race: 2020 Royal Truck & Trailer 200 (Toledo)
Wins	Top tens	Poles
0	2	0

ARCA Menards Series East career
- 7 races run over 4 years
- Best finish: 20th (2020)
- First race: 2017 Finger Lakes Wine Country 100 (Watkins Glen)
- Last race: 2020 Royal Truck & Trailer 200 (Toledo)
Wins	Top tens	Poles
0	2	0
- Statistics up to date as of January 31, 2025.

Robert "Bob" Pawlowski (born August 17, 1966) is an American professional stock car racing driver who has previously competed in the ARCA Menards Series and the ARCA Menards Series East from 2017 to 2020.

== Motorsports results ==
=== ARCA Menards Series ===
(key) (Bold – Pole position awarded by qualifying time. Italics – Pole position earned by points standings or practice time. * – Most laps led.)

ARCA Menards Series results
Year	Team	No.	Make	1	2	3	4	5	6	7	8	9	10	11	12	13	14	15	16	17	18	19	20	AMSC	Pts	Ref
2020	Robert Pawlowski Racing	11E	Chevy	DAY	PHO	TAL	POC	IRP	KEN	IOW	KAN	TOL	TOL	MCH	DRC	GTW	I44	TOL; 14	BRI	WIN	MEM	ISF	KAN	70th	30	

==== ARCA Menards Series East ====
ARCA Menards Series East results
Year	Team	No.	Make	1	2	3	4	5	6	7	8	9	10	11	12	13	14	AMSEC	Pts	Ref
2017	1/4 Ley Racing	32	Chevy	NSM	GRE	BRI	SBO	SBO	MEM	BLN	TMP	NHA	IOW	GLN; 14	LGY	NJM	DOV	60th	30	
2018	Robert Pawlowski Racing	11	Chevy	NSM	BRI	LGY	SBO	SBO	MEM	NJM	THO	NHA	IOW	GLN; 17	GTW	NHA	DOV	56th	27	
2019	Robert Pawlowski Racing	11	Chevy	NSM	BRI	SBO	SBO	MEM	NHA	IOW	GLN; 16	BRI	GTW	NHA; 10	DOV			26th	62	
2020	Robert Pawlowski Racing	11E	Chevy	NSM; 23	TOL; 10	DOV	TOL; 14	BRI	FIF									20th	85	
