= 2020 Royal Truck & Trailer 200 =

Race details
- Race 15 of 20 of the 2020 ARCA Menards Series; Race 4 of 6 of the 2020 ARCA Menards Series East
- Date: September 12, 2020
- Location: Toledo, Ohio, Toledo Speedway
- Course: Permanent racing facility
- Course length: 0.8 km (0.5 miles)
- Distance: 200 laps, 100 mi (160.934 km)
- Scheduled distance: 200 laps, 100 mi (160.934 km)
- Average speed: 64.586 miles per hour (103.941 km/h)

Pole position
| Driver | Sam Mayer | GMS Racing |
- Time: 15.914

Most laps led
| Driver | Sam Mayer | GMS Racing |
- Laps: 165

Winner
| No. 21 | Sam Mayer | GMS Racing |

Television in the United States
- Network: MAVTV
- Announcers: Bob Dillner, Jim Tretow

Radio in the United States
- Radio: ARCA Racing Network

The 2020 Royal Truck & Trailer 200 was the 15th stock car race of the 2020 ARCA Menards Series and the fourth race of the 2020 ARCA Menards Series East. The race was held on Saturday, September 12, 2020, in Toledo, Ohio, at Toledo Speedway, a 0.5 miles (0.80 km) permanent oval-shaped racetrack. The race took the scheduled 200 laps to complete. At race's end, Sam Mayer of GMS Racing would dominate to win his fourth career ARCA Menards Series win, his seventh career ARCA Menards Series East win, his fourth win of the season in the ARCA Menards Series, and his third win of the season in the ARCA Menards Series East. To fill out the podium, Chandler Smith of Venturini Motorsports and Ty Gibbs of Joe Gibbs Racing would finish second and third, respectively.

== Background ==
Toledo Speedway opened in 1960 and was paved in 1964. In 1978 it was sold to Thomas "Sonny" Adams Sr. The speedway was reacquired by ARCA in 1999. The track also features the weekly racing divisions of sportsman on the half-mile and Figure 8, factory stock, and four cylinders on a quarter-mile track inside the big track. They also have a series of races with outlaw-bodied late models that includes four 100-lap races and ends with Glass City 200. The track hosts the “Fastest short track show in the world” which features winged sprints and winged Super Modifieds on the half mile. Toledo also used to host a 200-lap late model race until its sale to ARCA in 1999.

Toledo is known for the foam blocks that line the race track, different than the concrete walls that line many short tracks throughout America. The crumbling walls can make track cleanup a tedious task for workers.

=== Entry list ===
| # | Driver | Team | Make | Sponsor |
|---|---|---|---|---|
| 4 | Hailie Deegan | DGR-Crosley | Ford | Monster Energy |
| 4E | Chase Cabre | Rev Racing | Toyota | Eibach, Max Siegel Incorporated |
| 6 | Nick Sanchez | Rev Racing | Toyota | Universal Technical Institute, NASCAR Technical Institute |
| 06 | Tim Richmond | Wayne Peterson Racing | Toyota | Wayne Peterson Racing |
| 10 | Owen Smith | Fast Track Racing | Chevrolet | Fast Track Racing |
| 11 | Rick Clifton | Fast Track Racing | Ford | Fast Track Racing |
| 11E | Robert Pawlowski | Robert Pawlowski Racing | Chevrolet | Channel Daily Clips Central |
| 12 | Mike Basham | Fast Track Racing | Toyota | Fast Track Racing |
| 15 | Drew Dollar | Venturini Motorsports | Toyota | Sunbelt Rentals |
| 17 | Taylor Gray | DGR-Crosley | Ford | Ford Performance |
| 18 | Ty Gibbs | Joe Gibbs Racing | Toyota | Monster Energy |
| 20 | Chandler Smith | Venturini Motorsports | Toyota | JBL |
| 21 | Sam Mayer | GMS Racing | Chevrolet | Lynn Family Foundation |
| 23 | Bret Holmes | Bret Holmes Racing | Chevrolet | Holmes II Excavating |
| 25 | Michael Self | Venturini Motorsports | Toyota | Sinclair |
| 25E | Mason Diaz | Venturini Motorsports | Toyota | Craftsman |
| 42 | Parker Retzlaff | Cook-Finley Racing | Toyota | Ponsse, Trump 2020 |
| 48 | Brad Smith | Brad Smith Motorsports | Chevrolet | Henshaw Automation |
| 91 | Justin Carroll | TC Motorsports | Toyota | Carroll's Automotive |
Official entry list

== Practice ==
The only 45-minute practice session was held on Saturday, September 12. Sam Mayer of GMS Racing would set the fastest time in the session, with a lap of 16.085 and an average speed of 111.906 miles per hour (180.095 km/h).

| Pos. | # | Driver | Team | Make | Time | Speed |
|---|---|---|---|---|---|---|
| 1 | 21 | Sam Mayer | GMS Racing | Chevrolet | 16.085 | 111.906 |
| 2 | 4 | Hailie Deegan | DGR-Crosley | Ford | 16.142 | 111.510 |
| 3 | 17 | Taylor Gray | DGR-Crosley | Ford | 16.205 | 111.077 |
Full practice results

== Qualifying ==
Qualifying was held on Saturday, September 12, at 3:30 PM EST. Each driver would have two laps to set a fastest time; the fastest of the two would count as their official qualifying lap.

Sam Mayer of GMS Racing would win the pole, setting a time of 15.999 and an average speed of 112.507 miles per hour (181.062 km/h).

=== Full qualifying results ===
| Pos. | # | Driver | Team | Make | Time | Speed |
|---|---|---|---|---|---|---|
| 1 | 21 | Sam Mayer | GMS Racing | Chevrolet | 15.914 | 113.108 |
| 2 | 20 | Chandler Smith | Venturini Motorsports | Toyota | 15.940 | 112.923 |
| 3 | 4 | Hailie Deegan | DGR-Crosley | Ford | 16.039 | 112.226 |
| 4 | 18 | Ty Gibbs | Joe Gibbs Racing | Toyota | 16.054 | 112.122 |
| 5 | 23 | Bret Holmes | Bret Holmes Racing | Chevrolet | 16.059 | 112.087 |
| 6 | 17 | Taylor Gray | DGR-Crosley | Ford | 16.101 | 111.794 |
| 7 | 4E | Chase Cabre | Rev Racing | Toyota | 16.142 | 111.510 |
| 8 | 25 | Michael Self | Venturini Motorsports | Toyota | 16.144 | 111.497 |
| 9 | 42 | Parker Retzlaff | Cook-Finley Racing | Toyota | 16.146 | 111.483 |
| 10 | 15 | Drew Dollar | Venturini Motorsports | Toyota | 16.207 | 111.063 |
| 11 | 6 | Nick Sanchez | Rev Racing | Toyota | 16.217 | 110.995 |
| 12 | 25E | Mason Diaz | Venturini Motorsports | Toyota | 16.235 | 110.872 |
| 13 | 91 | Justin Carroll | TC Motorsports | Toyota | 16.400 | 109.756 |
| 14 | 12 | Mike Basham | Fast Track Racing | Toyota | 17.224 | 104.505 |
| 15 | 11E | Robert Pawlowski | Robert Pawlowski Racing | Chevrolet | 17.650 | 101.983 |
| 16 | 06 | Tim Richmond | Wayne Peterson Racing | Toyota | 17.862 | 100.773 |
| 17 | 48 | Brad Smith | Brad Smith Motorsports | Chevrolet | 17.956 | 100.245 |
| 18 | 10 | Owen Smith | Fast Track Racing | Chevrolet | 18.580 | 96.878 |
| 19 | 11 | Rick Clifton | Fast Track Racing | Ford | 18.955 | 94.962 |
Official qualifying results

== Race results ==
| Fin | St | # | Driver | Team | Make | Laps | Led | Status | Pts |
|---|---|---|---|---|---|---|---|---|---|
| 1 | 1 | 21 | Sam Mayer | GMS Racing | Chevrolet | 200 | 165 | running | 49 |
| 2 | 2 | 20 | Chandler Smith | Venturini Motorsports | Toyota | 200 | 35 | running | 43 |
| 3 | 4 | 18 | Ty Gibbs | Joe Gibbs Racing | Toyota | 200 | 0 | running | 41 |
| 4 | 5 | 23 | Bret Holmes | Bret Holmes Racing | Chevrolet | 200 | 0 | running | 40 |
| 5 | 6 | 17 | Taylor Gray | DGR-Crosley | Ford | 200 | 0 | running | 39 |
| 6 | 3 | 4 | Hailie Deegan | DGR-Crosley | Ford | 200 | 0 | running | 38 |
| 7 | 8 | 25 | Michael Self | Venturini Motorsports | Toyota | 200 | 0 | running | 37 |
| 8 | 9 | 42 | Parker Retzlaff | Cook-Finley Racing | Toyota | 200 | 0 | running | 36 |
| 9 | 12 | 25E | Mason Diaz | Venturini Motorsports | Toyota | 200 | 0 | running | 35 |
| 10 | 11 | 6 | Nick Sanchez | Rev Racing | Toyota | 200 | 0 | running | 34 |
| 11 | 13 | 91 | Justin Carroll | TC Motorsports | Toyota | 199 | 0 | running | 33 |
| 12 | 14 | 12 | Mike Basham | Fast Track Racing | Toyota | 194 | 0 | running | 32 |
| 13 | 16 | 06 | Tim Richmond | Wayne Peterson Racing | Toyota | 189 | 0 | running | 31 |
| 14 | 15 | 11E | Robert Pawlowski | Robert Pawlowski Racing | Chevrolet | 186 | 0 | running | 30 |
| 15 | 10 | 15 | Drew Dollar | Venturini Motorsports | Toyota | 86 | 0 | crash | 29 |
| 16 | 7 | 4E | Chase Cabre | Rev Racing | Toyota | 55 | 0 | crash | 28 |
| 17 | 17 | 48 | Brad Smith | Brad Smith Motorsports | Chevrolet | 41 | 0 | overheating | 27 |
| 18 | 18 | 10 | Owen Smith | Fast Track Racing | Chevrolet | 5 | 0 | electrical | 26 |
| 19 | 19 | 11 | Rick Clifton | Fast Track Racing | Ford | 3 | 0 | brakes | 25 |
Official race results

| Previous race: 2020 Zinsser SmartCoat 200 | ARCA Menards Series; 2020 season | Next race: 2020 Bush's Beans 200 |

| Previous race: 2020 General Tire 125 | ARCA Menards Series East; 2020 season | Next race: 2020 Bush's Beans 200 |
