= Tyler Matthews =

American racing driver (born 1996)

- Born: Tyler Page Matthews; December 1, 1996 (age 29); Richlands, North Carolina, U.S.

NASCAR O'Reilly Auto Parts Series career
- 9 races run over 1 year
- 2019 position: 42nd
- Best finish: 42nd (2019)
- First race: 2019 ToyotaCare 250 (Richmond)
- Last race: 2019 Ford EcoBoost 300 (Homestead)
| Wins | Top tens | Poles |
|---|---|---|
| 0 | 0 | 0 |

NASCAR FedEx Freight Truck Series career
- 3 races run over 1 year
- 2018 position: 52nd
- Best finish: 52nd (2018)
- First race: 2018 Alpha Energy Solutions 250 (Martinsville)
- Last race: 2018 Buckle Up in Your Truck 225 (Kentucky)
| Wins | Top tens | Poles |
|---|---|---|
| 0 | 0 | 0 |
- Statistics up to date as of November 16, 2019.

Tyler Page Matthews (born December 1, 1996) is an American professional stock car racing driver. He last competed part-time in the NASCAR Xfinity Series, driving the No. 15 Chevrolet Camaro for JD Motorsports.

== Racing career ==
=== Camping World Truck Series ===
On January 28, 2018, it was announced that Matthews would drive part-time for MDM Motorsports in the NASCAR Camping World Truck Series, driving the No. 99 truck. He finished 21st in his only start for the MDM team.

Later in the 2018 season, Matthews ran the No. 83 for MB Motorsports at Gateway, finishing 17th after avoiding some of the chaos late in the going. He ran Kentucky in the No. 83 for Copp Motorsports in a partnership with NextGen Motorsports, wrecking on the first lap and finishing last.

=== Xfinity Series ===
In April 2019, Matthews joined JD Motorsports for his NASCAR Xfinity Series debut in the ToyotaCare 250 at Richmond Raceway. He finished two laps down in 24th place.

== Motorsports career results ==
=== NASCAR ===
(key) (Bold – Pole position awarded by qualifying time. Italics – Pole position earned by points standings or practice time. * – Most laps led.)

==== Xfinity Series ====
NASCAR Xfinity Series results
| Year | Team | No. | Make | 1 | 2 | 3 | 4 | 5 | 6 | 7 | 8 | 9 | 10 | 11 | 12 | 13 | 14 | 15 | 16 | 17 | 18 | 19 | 20 | 21 | 22 | 23 | 24 | 25 | 26 | 27 | 28 | 29 | 30 | 31 | 32 | 33 | NXSC | Pts | Ref |
|---|---|---|---|---|---|---|---|---|---|---|---|---|---|---|---|---|---|---|---|---|---|---|---|---|---|---|---|---|---|---|---|---|---|---|---|---|---|---|---|
| 2019 | JD Motorsports | 15 | Chevy | DAY | ATL | LVS | PHO | CAL | TEX | BRI | RCH; 24 | TAL | DOV | CLT | POC | MCH | IOW; 20 | CHI | DAY | KEN | NHA; 32 | IOW | GLN | MOH | | | | | LVS; 28 | | | | KAN; 28 | TEX | PHO; 22 | HOM; 37 | 42nd | 83 | |
| 2019 | Mike Harmon Racing | 74 | Chevy | | | | | | | | | | | | | | | | | | | | | | BRI; 27 | ROA | DAR | IND | | RCH; 33 | CLT | DOV | | | | | 42nd | 83 | |

==== Camping World Truck Series ====
NASCAR Camping World Truck Series results
| Year | Team | No. | Make | 1 | 2 | 3 | 4 | 5 | 6 | 7 | 8 | 9 | 10 | 11 | 12 | 13 | 14 | 15 | 16 | 17 | 18 | 19 | 20 | 21 | 22 | 23 | NCWTC | Pts | Ref |
|---|---|---|---|---|---|---|---|---|---|---|---|---|---|---|---|---|---|---|---|---|---|---|---|---|---|---|---|---|---|
| 2018 | MDM Motorsports | 99 | Chevy | DAY | ATL | LVS | MAR; 21 | DOV | KAN | CLT | TEX | IOW | | | | | | | | | | | | | | | 52nd | 41 | |
| 2018 | MB Motorsports | 83 | Chevy | | | | | | | | | | GTW; 17 | CHI | | | | | | | | | | | | | 52nd | 41 | |
| 2018 | Copp Motorsports | 83 | Chevy | | | | | | | | | | | | KEN; 32 | ELD | POC | MCH | BRI | MSP | LVS | TAL | MAR | TEX | PHO | HOM | 52nd | 41 | |

=== CARS Late Model Stock Car Tour ===
(key) (Bold – Pole position awarded by qualifying time. Italics – Pole position earned by points standings or practice time. * – Most laps led. ** – All laps led.)

CARS Late Model Stock Car Tour results
| Year | Team | No. | Make | 1 | 2 | 3 | 4 | 5 | 6 | 7 | 8 | 9 | 10 | 11 | 12 | 13 | 14 | 15 | CLMSCTC | Pts | Ref |
|---|---|---|---|---|---|---|---|---|---|---|---|---|---|---|---|---|---|---|---|---|---|
| 2018 | Steve Matthews | 63 | Chevy | TCM | MYB | ROU; 14 | HCY | BRI | ACE | CCS | KPT | HCY | WKS | ROU | SBO | | | | 56th | 19 | |
| 2019 | Steve Matthews | 63 | Toyota | SNM; 15 | HCY; 18 | ROU; 10 | ACE; 14 | MMS; 9 | LGY; 10 | DOM; 9 | CCS; 7 | HCY; 11 | ROU; 7 | SBO; 9 | | | | | 5th | 244 | |
| 2020 | Steve Matthews | 63 | Toyota | SNM; 18 | ACE; 20 | HCY; 17 | HCY; 23 | DOM; 16 | FCS; 22 | LGY; 18 | CCS; 22 | FLO; 11 | GRE; 16 | | | | | | 17th | 147 | |
| 2021 | Lee McCall | 41 | Ford | DIL | HCY; 2 | OCS; 3 | ACE | CRW | LGY | DOM; 13 | | | TCM; 16 | FLC; 13 | WKS | SBO | | | 18th | 133 | |
| 2021 | Lee McCall | 40 | Ford | | | | | | | | HCY; 19 | MMS | | | | | | | 18th | 133 | |
| 2022 | Steve Matthews | 63 | Chevy | CRW | HCY | GRE | AAS; 15 | FCS | LGY | DOM | HCY | ACE | MMS | NWS | TCM | ACE | SBO | CRW | 58th | 18 | |
| 2025 | Steve Matthews | 63 | Toyota | AAS | WCS | CDL | OCS | ACE | NWS | LGY | DOM | CRW | HCY | AND | FLC; 26 | SBO | TCM | NWS | 93rd | 16 | |

^{*} Season still in progress
^{1} Ineligible for series points
