= Mason Diaz =

American racing driver (born 2000)

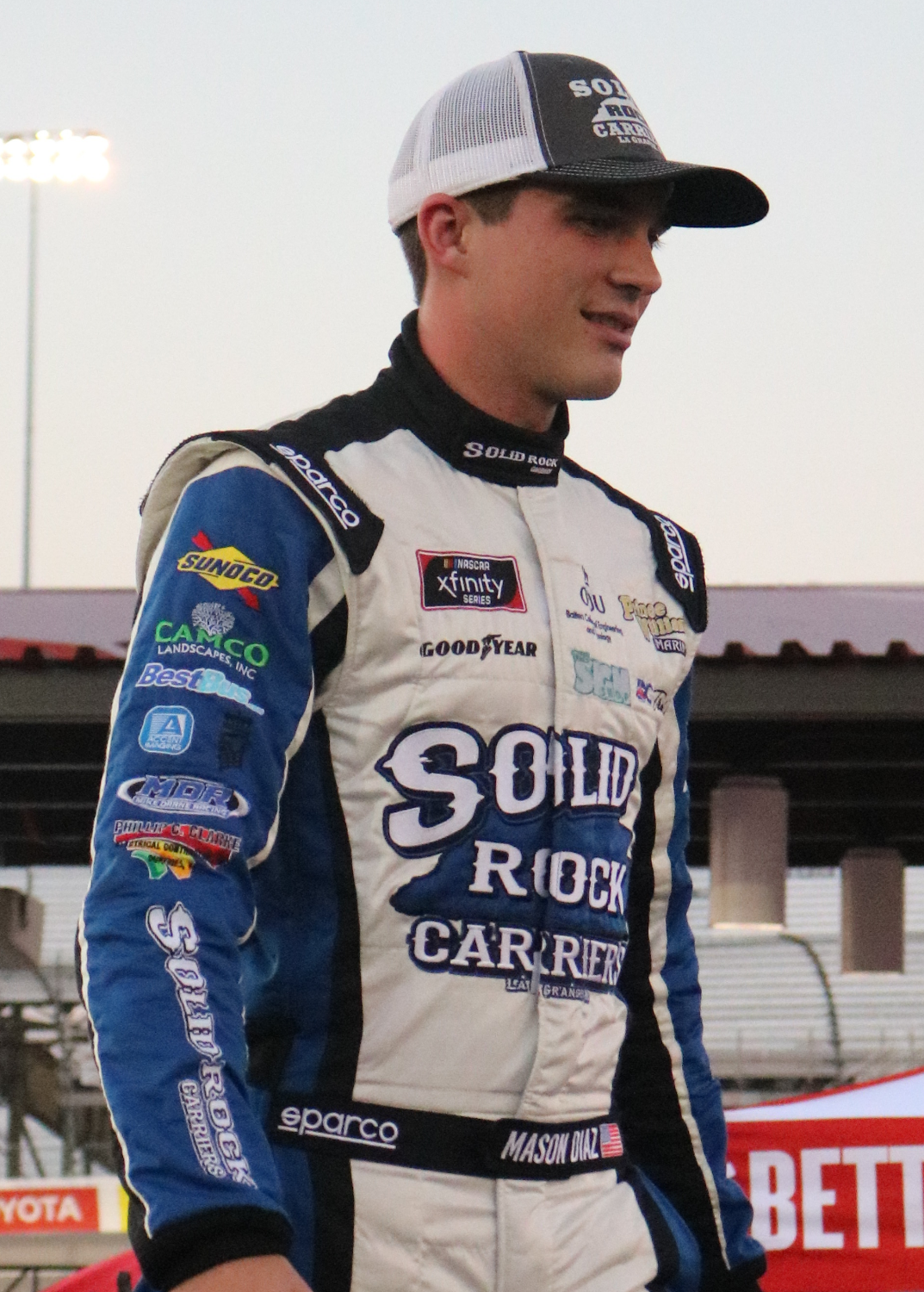
- Diaz at Richmond Raceway in 2018
- Born: Mason A. Diaz; May 16, 2000 (age 26); Manassas, Virginia, U.S.
- Achievements: 2021 Fall Brawl Winner (LMSC); 2023 Throwback 276 Winner (LMSC)

NASCAR O'Reilly Auto Parts Series career
- 6 races run over 3 years
- 2020 position: 59th
- Best finish: 59th (2020)
- First race: 2018 Go Bowling 250 (Richmond)
- Last race: 2020 Desert Diamond Casino West Valley 200 (Phoenix)
Wins	Top tens	Poles
0	0	0

NASCAR FedEx Freight Truck Series career
- 1 race run over 1 year
- 2017 position: 64th
- Best finish: 64th (2017)
- First race: 2017 Texas Roadhouse 200 (Martinsville)
Wins	Top tens	Poles
0	0	0

ARCA Menards Series career
- 6 races run over 3 years
- Best finish: 42nd (2020)
- First race: 2020 Royal Truck & Trailer 200 (Toledo)
- Last race: 2022 Lucas Oil 200 (Daytona)
Wins	Top tens	Poles
0	4	0

ARCA Menards Series East career
- 18 races run over 4 years
- Best finish: 5th (2020)
- First race: 2019 New Smyrna 175 (New Smyrna)
- Last race: 2021 Race to Stop Suicide 200 (New Smyrna)
Wins	Top tens	Poles
0	11	1

ARCA Menards Series West career
- 2 races run over 1 year
- Best finish: 29th (2020)
- First race: 2020 NAPA 125 (Roseville)
- Last race: 2020 NAPA/Eneos 125 (Kern County)
Wins	Top tens	Poles
0	1	0
- Statistics up to date as of January 22, 2021.

Mason A. Diaz (born May 16, 2000) is an American professional stock car racing driver. He last competed for Ferrier-McClure Racing, driving their No. 44 Toyota part-time in the ARCA Menards Series East and part-time in the ARCA Menards Series. He has previously competed in the NASCAR Xfinity Series, the NASCAR Camping World Truck Series, and the CARS Tour.

== Racing career ==
Starting at age four in go-karts, Diaz ran at Dominion Speedway in both Champ Car and Bandolero entries until age twelve. He later moved up to Legends car racing and late model racing, eventually running in the Pro All-Stars Series (PASS) during his late model days. He later started racing frequently at Southern National Motorsports Park.

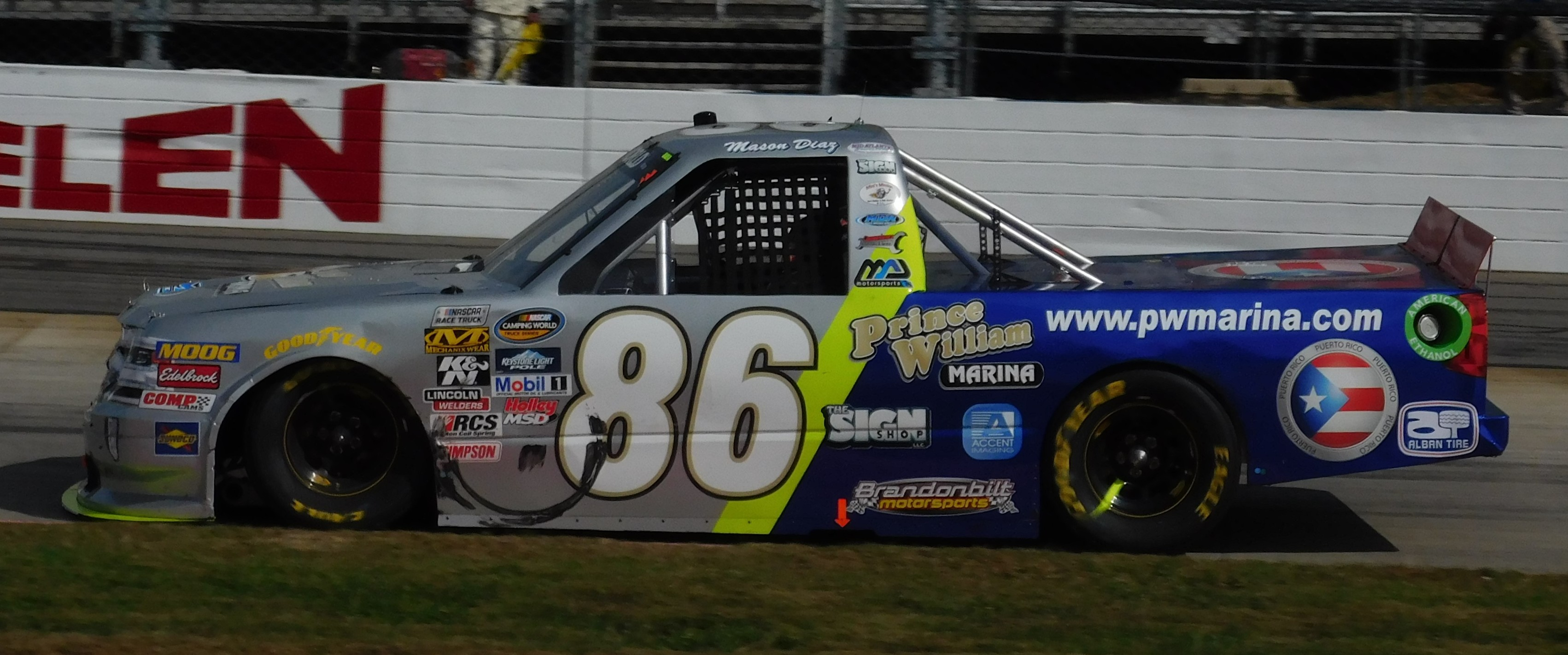
Diaz's No. 86 truck at Martinsville Speedway in 2017

Diaz made his first and to-date only NASCAR Camping World Truck Series start in 2017 at Martinsville, driving the No. 86 Chevrolet Silverado for driver Brandon Brown's Brandonbilt Motorsports team. He started ninth and finished 23rd.

Diaz made his Xfinity Series debut at Richmond's fall race in 2018, driving for Brandonbilt Motorsports in the No. 90 car, using owner points from DGM Racing. He would run three more races for Brown's team the following year in their own No. 68 and 86 cars.

In 2019, when Diaz was racing at the 2019 Snowflake 100 at Five Flags Speedway, he was approached by a representative from Venturini Motorsports, and the two initially agreed to a deal that would have put Diaz in the team's No. 20 Toyota in the ARCA Menards Series in the races that Chandler Smith was ineligible to drive in. However, this deal was later changed to have him run the full season in the ARCA Menards Series East instead.

Diaz continued racing in the now-ARCA Menards Series East in 2020, where he finished fifth in points with a best finish of third at Dover International Speedway, with additional starts coming in the ARCA Menards Series West. He returned to the Xfinity Series in late October when he joined Sam Hunt Racing for the final two races of the season at Martinsville Speedway and Phoenix Raceway.

On January 19, 2021, it was announced that Diaz would be leaving Venturini and joining Visconti Motorsports, driving their No. 74 car full-time, with it being Diaz's second full-time season in the East Series.

== Personal life ==
Diaz is a former student at Old Dominion University.

== Motorsports career results ==
=== Stock car career summary ===
Season	Series	Team	Races	Wins	Top 5	Top 10	Points	Position
2015	CARS Super Late Model Tour	Michael Diaz	1	0	0	0	5	68th
2016	CARS Late Model Stock Car Tour	TSS Motorsports	2	0	0	1	33	31st
2017	NASCAR Camping World Truck Series	Brandonbilt Motorsports	1	0	0	0	17	64th
2018	CARS Super Late Model Tour	Michael Diaz	1	0	0	0	11	49th
2018	CARS Late Model Stock Car Tour	TSS Motorsports	2	0	0	0	37	32nd
2018	NASCAR Xfinity Series	Brandonbilt Motorsports	1	0	0	0	18	63rd
2019	CARS Super Late Model Tour	Michael Diaz	1	0	0	0	20	38th
2019	CARS Late Model Stock Car Tour	Nelson Motorsports	1	0	0	0	12	57th
2019	NASCAR K&N Pro Series East	MAD Motorsports	5	0	1	2	160	15th
2019	NASCAR Xfinity Series	Brandonbilt Motorsports	3	0	0	0	9	76th
2020	ARCA Menards Series West	Venturini Motorsports	2	0	1	1	76	29th
2020	ARCA Menards Series East	Venturini Motorsports	6	0	2	3	301	5th
2020	ARCA Menards Series	Venturini Motorsports	2	0	1	2	75	42nd
2020	NASCAR Xfinity Series	Sam Hunt Racing	2	0	0	0	30	59th
2021	CARS Late Model Stock Car Tour	MAD Motorsports	11	0	2	5	227	13th
2021	ARCA Menards Series East	Visconti Motorsports	8	0	3	5	373	6th
2021	ARCA Menards Series	Visconti Motorsports	3	0	0	1	74	51st
2022	SMART Modified Tour	N/A	1	0	0	0	10	51st
2022	CARS Pro Late Model Tour	Brandon Setzer	1	0	1	1	34	31st
2022	CARS Late Model Stock Car Tour	MAD Motorsports	15	0	3	4	300	8th
2022	ARCA Menards Series East	Ferrier-McClure Racing	1	0	0	1	57	33rd
2022	ARCA Menards Series East	Mullins Racing	1	0	0	0	57	33rd
2022	ARCA Menards Series	Ferrier-McClure Racing	1	0	0	1	56	58th
2022	ARCA Menards Series	Mullins Racing	1	0	0	0	56	58th
2023	ASA STARS National Tour	Mason Diaz	0	0	0	0	11	110th
2023	CARS Late Model Stock Car Tour	MAD Motorsports	16	1	6	11	381	**3rd**
2024	CARS Late Model Stock Car Tour	JM Racing	2	0	0	0	0	N/A
2024	CARS Late Model Stock Car Tour	JR Motorsports	1	0	0	0	0	N/A
2024	CARS Late Model Stock Car Tour	MAD Motorsports	1	0	0	0	0	N/A
2024	CARS Late Model Stock Car Tour	N/A	1	0	0	0	0	N/A
2024	CARS Late Model Stock Car Tour	Hedgecock Racing	2	0	1	2	0	N/A
2025	CARS Pro Late Model Tour	Fathead Racing	2	0	0	0	56	41st
2025	CARS Late Model Stock Car Tour	Hedgecock Racing	5	0	1	1	121	27th
2026	CARS Late Model Stock Car Tour	Hedgecock Racing	6	0	0	0	149	27th

=== NASCAR ===
(key) (Bold – Pole position awarded by qualifying time. Italics – Pole position earned by points standings or practice time. * – Most laps led.)

==== Xfinity Series ====
NASCAR Xfinity Series results
Year	Team	No.	Make	1	2	3	4	5	6	7	8	9	10	11	12	13	14	15	16	17	18	19	20	21	22	23	24	25	26	27	28	29	30	31	32	33	NXSC	Pts	Ref
2018	Brandonbilt Motorsports	90	Chevy	DAY	ATL	LVS	PHO	CAL	TEX	BRI	RCH	TAL	DOV	CLT	POC	MCH	IOW	CHI	DAY	KEN	NHA	IOW	GLN	MOH	BRI	ROA	DAR	IND	LVS	RCH; 19	CLT	DOV	KAN	TEX	PHO	HOM	63rd	18	
2019	Brandonbilt Motorsports	86	Chevy	DAY	ATL	LVS	PHO	CAL	TEX	BRI	RCH; 36	TAL	DOV	CLT; 30	POC	MCH	IOW	CHI	DAY	KEN	NHA	IOW	GLN	MOH													75th	9	
2019	Brandonbilt Motorsports	68	Chevy																						BRI; 38	ROA	DAR	IND	LVS	RCH	CLT	DOV	KAN	TEX	PHO	HOM	75th	9	
2020	Sam Hunt Racing	26	Toyota	DAY	LVS	CAL	PHO	DAR	CLT	BRI	ATL	HOM	HOM	TAL	POC	IND	KEN	KEN	TEX	KAN	ROA	DAY	DOV	DOV	DAY	DAR	RCH	RCH	BRI	LVS	TAL	CLT	KAN	TEX	MAR; 20	PHO; 24	59th	30	

==== Camping World Truck Series ====
NASCAR Camping World Truck Series results
Year	Team	No.	Make	1	2	3	4	5	6	7	8	9	10	11	12	13	14	15	16	17	18	19	20	21	22	23	NCWTC	Pts	Ref
2017	Brandonbilt Motorsports	86	Chevy	DAY	ATL	MAR	KAN	CLT	DOV	TEX	GTW	IOW	KEN	ELD	POC	MCH	BRI	MSP	CHI	NHA	LVS	TAL	MAR; 23	TEX	PHO	HOM	64th	17	

=== ARCA Menards Series ===
(key) (Bold – Pole position awarded by qualifying time. Italics – Pole position earned by points standings or practice time. * – Most laps led. ** – All laps led.)

ARCA Menards Series results
Year	Team	No.	Make	1	2	3	4	5	6	7	8	9	10	11	12	13	14	15	16	17	18	19	20	AMSC	Pts	Ref
2020	Venturini Motorsports	25E	Toyota	DAY	PHO	TAL	POC	IRP	KEN	IOW	KAN	TOL	TOL	MCH	DAY	GTW	L44	TOL; 9	BRI; 4	WIN	MEM	ISF	KAN	42nd	75	
2021	Visconti Motorsports	74	Toyota	DAY	PHO	TAL	KAN	TOL	CLT	MOH	POC	ELK	BLN	IOW; 8	WIN	GLN	MCH	ISF	MLW; 19	DSF	BRI; 31	SLM	KAN	51st	74	
2022	Ferrier-McClure Racing	44	Chevy	DAY; 7	PHO	TAL	KAN	CLT	IOW	BLN	ELK	MOH	POC	IRP	MCH	GLN	ISF	MLW	DSF	KAN				58th	56	
2022	Mullins Racing	3	Toyota																		BRI; 25	SLM	TOL	58th	56	

==== ARCA Menards Series East ====
ARCA Menards Series East results
Year	Team	No.	Make	1	2	3	4	5	6	7	8	9	10	11	12	AMSEC	Pts	Ref
2019	MAD Motorsports	24	Ford	NSM; 14	BRI; 8	SBO; 17	SBO; 17	MEM	NHA	IOW	GLN					15th	160	
2019	MAD Motorsports	24	Toyota									BRI; 4	GTW	NHA	DOV	15th	160	
2020	Venturini Motorsports	25	Toyota	NSM; 17	**TOL**; 14	DOV; 3			FIF; 16							5th	301	
2020	Venturini Motorsports	25E	Toyota				TOL; 9	BRI; 4								5th	301	
2021	Visconti Motorsports	74	Toyota	NSM; 4	FIF; 2	NSV; 2	DOV; 11	**SNM**; 7*	IOW; 8	MLW; 19	BRI; 31					6th	373	
2022	Ferrier-McClure Racing	44	Ford	NSM; 6	FIF	DOV	NSV	IOW	MLW							33rd	57	
2022	Mullins Racing	3	Ford							BRI; 25						33rd	57	

^{*} Season still in progress
^{1} Ineligible for series points

==== ARCA Menards Series West ====
ARCA Menards Series West results
Year	Team	No.	Make	1	2	3	4	5	6	7	8	9	10	11	AMSWC	Pts	Ref
2020	Venturini Motorsports	25	Toyota	LVS	MMP	MMP	IRW	EVG	DCS	CNS	LVS	AAS; 12	KCR; 2	PHO	29th	76	

=== CARS Late Model Stock Car Tour ===
(key) (Bold – Pole position awarded by qualifying time. Italics – Pole position earned by points standings or practice time. * – Most laps led. ** – All laps led.)

CARS Late Model Stock Car Tour results
Year	Team	No.	Make	1	2	3	4	5	6	7	8	9	10	11	12	13	14	15	16	17	CLMSCTC	Pts	Ref
2016	TSS Motorsports	24	Ford	SNM; 25	ROU	HCY	TCM	GRE	ROU	CON	MYB	HCY									31st	33	
2016	TSS Motorsports	24D	Ford										SNM; 8								31st	33	
2018	TSS Motorsports	24	Ford	TCM	MYB	ROU	HCY	BRI	ACE	CCS	KPT	HCY; 14	WKS	OCS	SBO; 15						32nd	37	
2019	Nelson Motorsports	12	Toyota	SNM	HCY	ROU	ACE	MMS	LGY	DOM; 21	CCS	HCY	ROU	SBO							57th	12	
2021	MAD Motorsports	24	Toyota	DIL; 10	HCY; 22	OCS; 22	ACE; 16	CRW; 8	LGY; 15	DOM; 8			TCM; 15	FLC	WKS; 14	SBO; 5					13th	227	
2021	MAD Motorsports	11D	Chevy								HCY; 2	MMS									13th	227	
2022	MAD Motorsports	24	Chevy	CRW; 23		GPS; 26	AAS; 5	FCS; 5	LGY; 11	**DOM**; 11		ACE; 18	MMS; 19	NWS; 2	TCM; 14	ACE; 13	SBO; 8	CRW; 23			8th	300	
2022	MAD Motorsports	24	Ford		HCY; 12																8th	300	
2022	MAD Motorsports	8	Chevy								HCY; 9										8th	300	
2023	MAD Motorsports	24	Chevy	SNM; 8	FLC; 32	HCY; 6	ACE; 7	NWS; 13	LGY; 22	DOM; 7	CRW; 2		ACE; 2	TCM; 7	WKS; 2	AAS; 4	SBO; 13	TCM; 2	CRW; 23		3rd	381	
2023	MAD Motorsports	52S	Chevy									HCY; 1									3rd	381	
2024	JM Racing	14	Ford	SNM; 30				ACE; 20	TCM	LGY											N/A	0	
2024	JR Motorsports	8	Chevy		HCY; 24	AAS	OCS														N/A	0	
2024	MAD Motorsports	24M	Toyota								DOM; 27	CRW									N/A	0	
2024	N/A	51	Chevy										HCY; 20								N/A	0	
2024	Hedgecock Racing	45	Chevy											NWS; 7	ACE	WCS	FLC; 5	SBO	TCM	NWS	N/A	0	
2025	Hedgecock Racing	41	Chevy	AAS; 24	WCS	CDL	OCS	**ACE**; 21	NWS; 23	LGY	DOM	CRW				SBO; 5	TCM	NWS			27th	121	
2025	Hedgecock Racing	8D	Chevy										HCY; 19	AND	FLC						27th	121	
2026	Hedgecock Racing	41	Chevy	SNM; 18	WCS; 12	NSV; 15	CRW; 22	ACE; 25	LGY	DOM; 11	NWS	HCY	AND	FLC	TCM	NPS	SBO				27th	149	

=== CARS Super Late Model Tour ===
(key)

CARS Super Late Model Tour results
Year	Team	No.	Make	1	2	3	4	5	6	7	8	9	10	CSLMTC	Pts	Ref
2015	Michael Diaz	24D	N/A	SNM	ROU	HCY	SNM	TCM	MMS	ROU	CON	MYB	HCY; 28	68th	5	
2018	Michael Diaz	24	Toyota	MYB	NSH	ROU	HCY	BRI	AND	HCY; 22	ROU	SBO		49th	11	
2019	Michael Diaz	24D	Toyota	SNM; 13	HCY	NSH	MMS	BRI	HCY	ROU	SBO			38th	20	

=== CARS Pro Late Model Tour ===
(key)

CARS Pro Late Model Tour results
Year	Team	No.	Make	1	2	3	4	5	6	7	8	9	10	11	12	13	CPLMTC	Pts	Ref
2022	Brandon Setzer	6	Ford	CRW	HCY	GPS	FCS	TCM	HCY	ACE	MMS	TCM	**ACE**; 2*	SBO	CRW		31st	34	
2025	Fathead Racing	21	N/A	AAS	CDL	OCS	ACE	NWS	CRW	HCY; 15							41st	56	
2025	Fathead Racing	10	N/A								HCY; 13	AND	FLC	SBO	TCM	NWS	41st	56	

=== ASA STARS National Tour ===
(key) (Bold – Pole position awarded by qualifying time. Italics – Pole position earned by points standings or practice time. * – Most laps led. ** – All laps led.)

ASA STARS National Tour results
Year	Team	No.	Make	1	2	3	4	5	6	7	8	9	10	ASNTC	Pts	Ref
2023	Mason Diaz	24	Toyota	FIF	MAD	NWS; DNQ	HCY	MLW	AND	WIR	TOL	WIN	NSV	110th	11	

=== SMART Modified Tour ===
SMART Modified Tour results
Year	Car owner	No.	Make	1	2	3	4	5	6	7	8	9	10	11	12	13	SMTC	Pts	Ref
2022	N/A	79D	N/A	FLO	SNM; 21	CRW	SBO	FCS	CRW	NWS	NWS	CAR	DOM	HCY	TRI	PUL	51st	10	
