= 2022 CARS Tour =

26th season of the CARS Tour

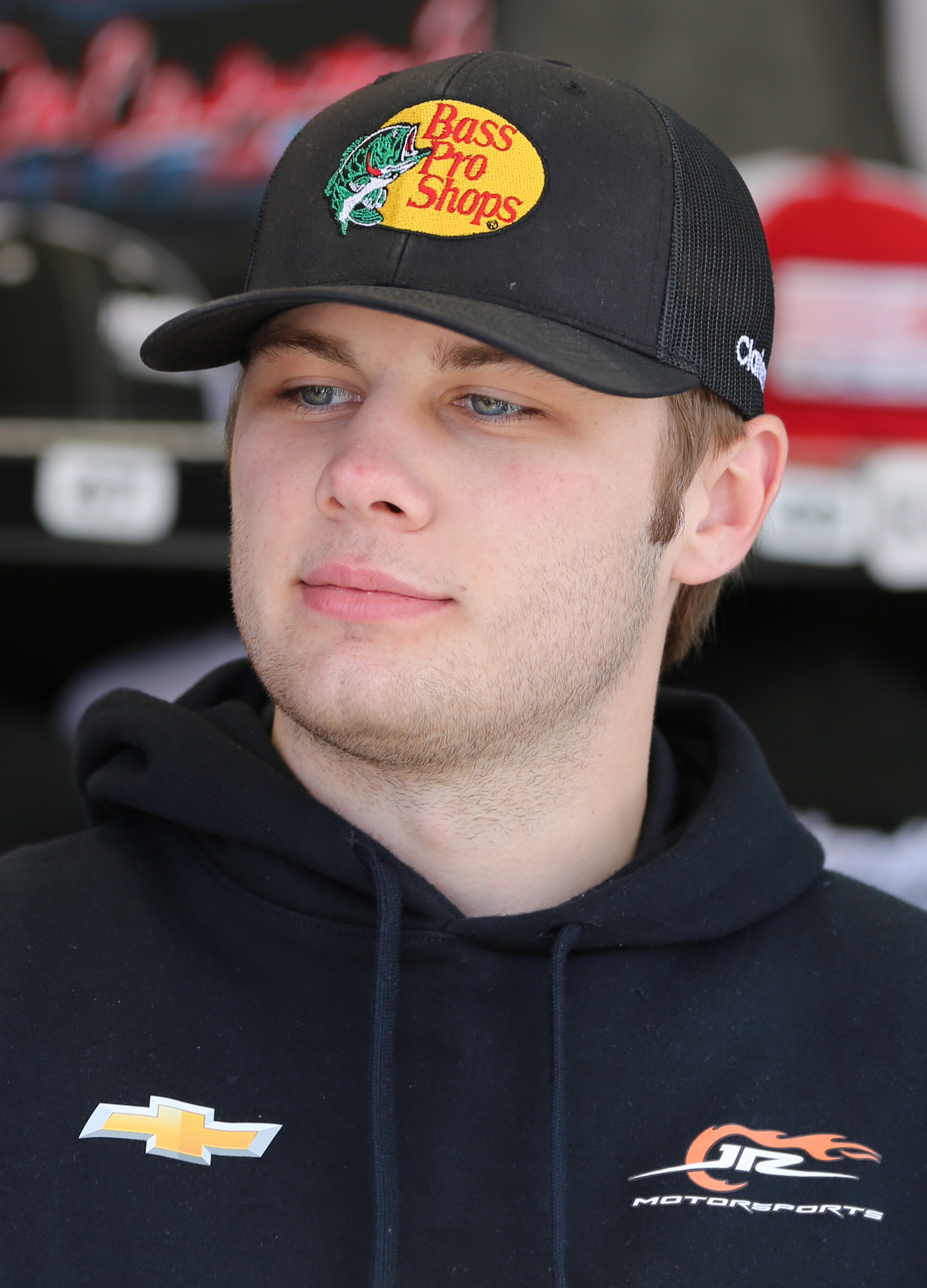
Carson Kvapil, the 2022 Late Model Stock Car Tour champion.

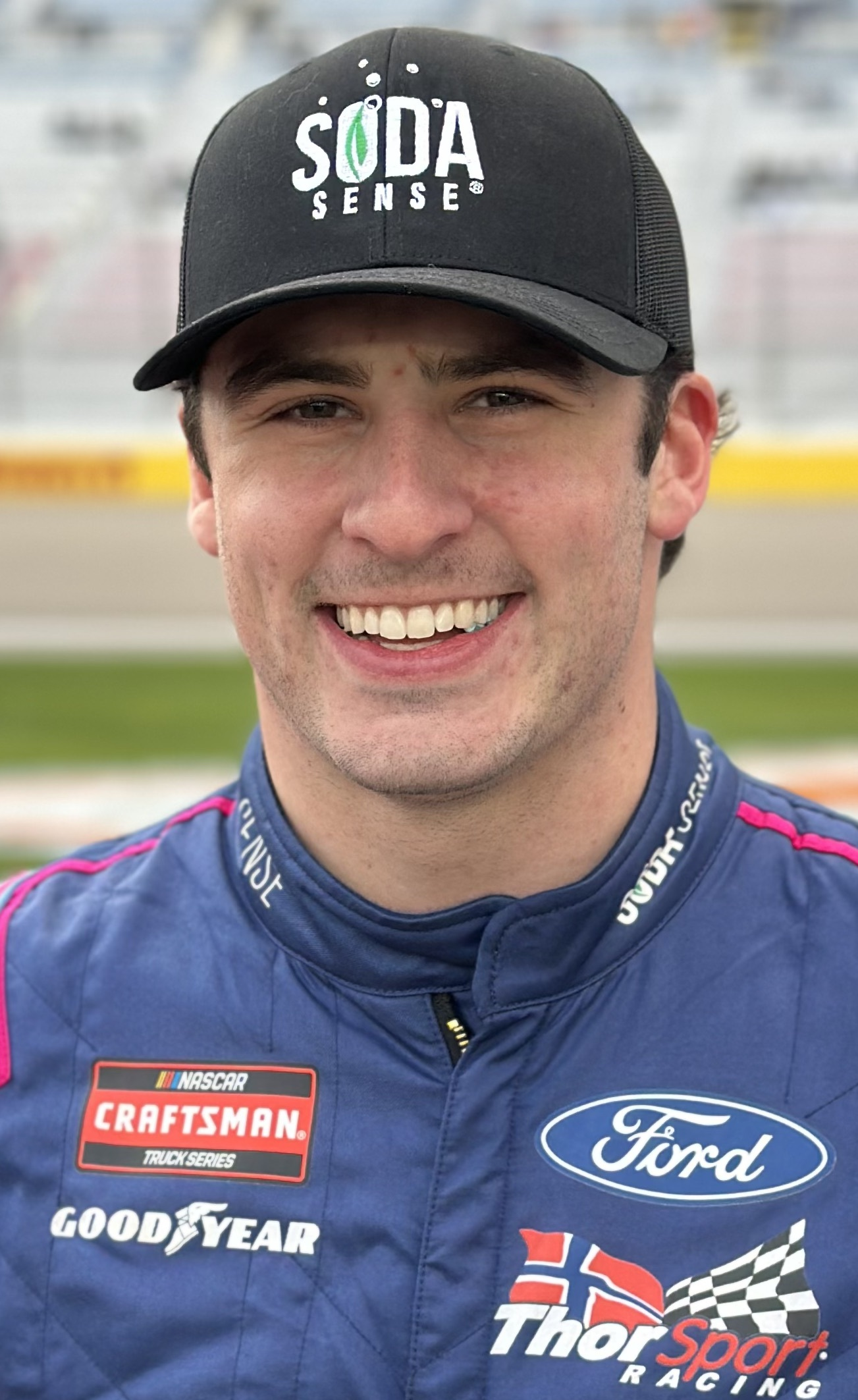
Luke Fenhaus, the 2022 Pro Late Model Tour champion.

The 2022 CARS Tour was the 26th season of the Solid Rock Carriers CARS Tour, a stock car racing series. It began at Caraway Speedway on March 12 and ended at Caraway Speedway on November 5. Carson Kvapil won the Late Model Stock Tour championship, while Luke Fenhaus won the inaugural Pro Late Model Tour championship.

Bobby McCarty entered the season as the defending Late Model Stock Tour champion, while Carson Kvapil entered as last years Super Late Model Tour champion, which was discontinued following the previous season.

This was the first season to include the Pro Late Model Tour, after the series discontinued the Super Late Model Tour following the conclusion of the previous season. This was also the last season before the series was acquired by DEJ Management, Jeff Burton Autosports, Inc., Kevin Harvick Incorporated, and Trackhouse Racing.

== Schedule & results ==
Date	Track	Location	LMSC Winner	PLM Winner
March 13	Caraway Speedway	Asheboro, North Carolina	Carson Kvapil	Caden Kvapil
March 26	Hickory Motor Speedway	Hickory, North Carolina	Chad McCumbee	William Sawalich
April 9	Greenville-Pickens Speedway	Greenville, South Carolina	Josh Berry	Gio Ruggiero
April 23	Goodyear All-American Speedway	Jacksonville, North Carolina	Connor Hall	N/A
May 21–22 (Note: Race concluded in the early morning hours of May 22 due to weather.)	Franklin County Speedway	Callaway, Virginia	Carson Kvapil	Ryan Moore
June 4	Langley Speedway	Langley, Virginia	Brenden Queen	N/A
June 18	Dominion Raceway	Thornburg, Virginia	Connor Hall	N/A
June 25	Tri-County Speedway	Hudson, North Carolina	N/A	William Sawalich
July 30 & August 6	Hickory Motor Speedway	Hickory, North Carolina	Connor Hall (8/6)	William Sawalich (7/30)
August 12	Ace Speedway	Altamahaw, North Carolina	Jonathan Shafer	William Sawalich
August 27	Pulaski County Motorsports Park	Fairlawn, Virginia	Deac McCaskill	William Sawalich
August 31	North Wilkesboro Speedway	North Wilkesboro, North Carolina	Carson Kvapil	N/A
September 9	Tri-County Speedway	Hudson, North Carolina	Conner Jones	Jake Garcia
October 7	Ace Speedway	Altamahaw, North Carolina	Kaden Honeycutt	Caden Kvapil
October 22	South Boston Speedway	South Boston, Virginia	Carson Kvapil	William Sawalich
November 5	Caraway Speedway	Asheboro, North Carolina	Jared Fryar	Austin MacDonald

== Standings ==
=== Late Model Stock Car championship ===
(key) Bold – Pole position awarded by time. Italics – Pole position set by final practice results or rainout. * – Most laps led.

Pos	Driver	CRW	HCY	GRE	AAS	FCS	LGY	DOM	HCY	ACE	PUL	NWS	TCM	ACE	SBS	CRW	Points
1	Carson Kvapil	1	2	3	4	1	**2***	15	4	4	**2**	**1***	4		1	3	432
2	Connor Hall	**14**	15	24	**1***	4*	6	1	**1**	9	5	16	21*	3	4	2	385
3	Jacob Heafner	20	24	8	10	3	5	2	18	13	8	11	6	5	6	7	350
4	Kaden Honeycutt	2*	7	21	9	8	4	6	3	3	6	6		1*		20	338
5	Chad McCumbee	18	**1***	6	3	9	3	20	14	2	17	15	9	15	29	19	323
6	Brandon Pierce	10	6	10	20	11	12	12	6	15	21	10	10	23	11	10	308
7	Bobby McCarty	16	8	19	8	25	8	7	26	5	4	5	25	21	9	5	305
8	Mason Diaz	23	12	26	5	5	11	**11***	9	18	19	2	14	13	8	23	300
9	Chase Burrow	6	5	25	7	23	20	10	16	7	20	13	7	9	22	9	297
10	Conner Jones	17	16	9	6	24	17	22	8	10	7	20	1	6	12		291
11	Zack Miracle	28	23	15	19	6	10	16	7	14	14	7	3	22	5	16	290
12	Braden Rogers	9	21	11	14	22	16	8	20	12	11	12	5	17	17	14	286
13	Carter Langley	7	10	7	22	16	18	13	19	8	10	30	20	10	15	15	275
14	Jonathan Shafer	22	26	18	11		7	4	29	**1****		4	2	7	27		245
15	Andrew Grady	19	9	23	18	14	13	19	22	20	15	17	16		26	12	223
16	Deac McCaskill	8			2	10	9		5	22	1*		19		7		218
17	Janson Marchbanks	27	11	16	12	12	14	17	DNS	17	13	21	8	20			208
18	Hayden Swank	30	17	13	16	13	19	23	23	19	18	28	13	19	24	24	198
19	Jared Fryar	3		2				18		6		14		8		1	182
20	Trevor Ward	15	13			19			15	16				24	14	**13***	138
21	William Sawalich		4						2*	21		8	**17**				116
22	Layne Riggs	26	3	4*											2		101
23	Dylan Ward	29	18			27			24	23				16		8	86
24	Mike Looney	25	25	28		**18**					3	29	22				82
25	Landon Pembelton							3	17						**3***		80
26	Isabella Robusto								13				11		19	17	72
27	Mini Tyrrell									24		22	26	12	10		72
28	Kyle Dudley					2					22					6	69
29	Jason York	4			21	21										21	66
30	Josh Berry			**1**										2			66
31	Connor Mosack					7					9	18					65
32	Corey Heim	5		5								27					63
33	Justin Johnson	21	14	17	17												63
34	Jonathan Findley			22				5	11								61
35	Ashton Higgins												15	11	13		60
36	Dylon Wilson								12			19	12				56
37	Ryan Millington												18	**4**			46
38	Blake Stallings									11				25	20		43
39	Brenden Queen						1					26					41
40	Daniel Silvestri								10						16		40
41	Heath Causey	12												14			40
42	Katie Hettinger										12	24			30		36
43	Parker Eatmon							14							18		34
44	Ryan Wilson	33														4	31
45	Dale Earnhardt Jr.											3					30
46	Chase Dixon	31	19						25								24
47	Grayson Cullather							9									24
48	Stefan Parsons											9					24
49	Mike Darne	32	27											18			23
50	Peyton Sellers	11															22
51	Ronald Hill	13													23		22
52	Trey Crews															11	22
53	Austin Somero			12													21
54	Bradley McCaskill				13												20
55	Riley Gentry			14													19
56	Daryn Cockram					15											18
57	Mark Wertz						15										18
58	Tyler Matthews				15												18
59	Jason Merriman										16						17
60	Mitch Walker								27				23				16
61	Tony Housman					17											16
62	Colby Higgins	34	22						DNS								15
63	Kade Brown															18	15
64	Cameron Bolin			20													13
65	Jimmy Mullins					20											13
66	Taylor Satterfield		20														13
67	Davey Callihan							21									12
68	Garin March								21								12
69	Tyler Gregory															22	11
70	Craig Moore								DNS						28		10
71	Pat Rachels											23					10
72	Coy Beard	24															9
73	Daniel Thomas							24									9
74	Thomas Beane												24				9
75	Bryan Reedy											25					8
76	Bobby Gillespie					26											7
77	Magnum Tate			27													6
78	Jaiden Reyna														31		5
79	Luke Fenhaus								28								5
80	Jessica Cann														25		2
81	John Goin														21		2
82	Rajah Caruth								DNQ								2
83	Connor Zilisch														Wth		0
Pos	Driver	CRW	HCY	GRE	AAS	FCS	LGY	DOM	HCY	ACE	PUL	NWS	TCM	ACE	SBS	CRW	Points

=== Pro Late Model Tour championship ===
(key) Bold – Pole position awarded by time. Italics – Pole position set by final practice results or rainout. * – Most laps led.

Pos	Driver	CRW	HCY	GRE	FCS	TCM	HCY	ACE	PUL	TCM	ACE	SBS	CRW	Points
1	Luke Fenhaus	**2***	3	4	**2***	4	2	2	4	2	3	2	6	366
2	Caden Kvapil	1	2	2	7	5	9	7	3	4	1	6	**2***	354
3	Austin MacDonald	3	13	5	4	8	6	3	7	11	10	3	1	324
4	William Sawalich	4	**1****		5	**1****	**1****	**1****	**1****	**12***		**1**		298
5	Kody King	12	7	9		6	13	5	15	13	9	7	5	262
6	Logan Jones	10	6	10	6		5		11	14		9	12	214
7	Luke Morey		DNQ		11	12	8		14	8	5	11	7	188
8	Rusty Skewes					14	12	8	16	15	7	10	9	173
9	Charlie Keevan	16	5	8	8	9								119
10	Penn Crim	11	DNQ	13				6			8	13		114
11	Nick Loden						4	4			6	5		113
12	Ryan Moore		12		1					5		8*		110
13	Lee Tissot			14			10			6			13	89
14	Katie Hettinger					13			2		4			80
15	Gio Ruggiero			**1****		2								67
16	Brent Crews	14							8			12		66
17	Brandon Setzer			3									3	60
18	Buddy Kofoid								5			4		57
19	William Hale						3		10					53
20	Gavan Boschele								6	7				53
21	Tommy Neal	6								10				50
22	Stephen Leicht						7			9				50
23	Tyler Johnson	9	8											49
24	Jeff Batten	7	11											48
25	Tanner Carter			11		11								44
26	Clark Houston						11		13					42
27	Clint King	8							17					41
28	Joe Manusco		14										11	41
29	Ruben Caceres Jr.		15						12					39
30	Jake Garcia									1				34
31	Mason Diaz										**2***			34
32	Cale Gale				3									30
33	Jett Noland					3								30
34	Matt Craig									3				30
35	Vicente Salas		4											29
36	Matt Caprara												4	29
37	Trevor Sanborn	5												28
38	Bryan Kruzeck			6										27
39	Steve Dorer			7										26
40	Michael Hinde					7								26
41	Gus Dean				9									25
42	Kyle Campbell												8	25
43	Jacob Creed		9											24
44	Garrett Smithley								9					24
45	Annabeth Barnes		10											23
46	Michael Gaier				10									23
47	Landon S. Huffman					10								23
48	Nate Gregg												10	23
49	Mason Maggio			12										21
50	Braden Rogers				12									21
51	Gabe Brown	13												20
52	Dylan Ward	15												18
Pos	Driver	CRW	HCY	GRE	FCS	TCM	HCY	ACE	PUL	TCM	ACE	SBS	CRW	Points

== See also ==
- 2022 NASCAR Cup Series
- 2022 NASCAR Xfinity Series
- 2022 NASCAR Camping World Truck Series
- 2022 ARCA Menards Series
- 2022 ARCA Menards Series East
- 2022 ARCA Menards Series West
- 2022 NASCAR Whelen Modified Tour
- 2022 NASCAR Pinty's Series
- 2022 NASCAR Mexico Series
- 2022 NASCAR Whelen Euro Series
- 2022 SRX Series
- 2022 SMART Modified Tour
