= Lee Tissot =

American racing driver

- Born: Lee Randall Tissot; October 10, 1969 (age 57) Arden, North Carolina, U.S.

CARS Pro Late Model Tour career
- Debut season: 2022
- Years active: 2022–2023, 2026–present
- Starts: 9
- Championships: 0
- Wins: 0
- Poles: 0
- Best finish: 13th in 2022
- Statistics up to date as of October 10, 2026.

Lee Randall Tissot (born October 10, 1969) is an American professional stock car racing driver. He currently competes in the zMAX CARS Tour, driving the No. 27 for Tissot Racing. He is the son of the late Randy Tissot, who also competed in racing.

Tissot has also competed in series such as the SouthEast Super Trucks Series, where he is a multiple time champion, the [UARA STARS Late Model Series, the IHRA Stock Car Series, and the NASCAR Local Racing Series.

== Motorsports results ==
=== Busch Series ===
NASCAR Busch Series results
Year	Team	No.	Make	1	2	3	4	5	6	7	8	9	10	11	12	13	14	15	16	17	18	19	20	21	22	23	24	25	26	27	28	29	30	31	NBSC	Pts	Ref
1992	N/A	N/A	Olds	DAY	CAR	RCH	ATL	MAR	DAR	BRI	HCY	LAN	DUB	NZH	CLT	DOV	ROU	MYB	GLN	VOL	NHA	TAL	IRP	ROU	MCH	NHA	BRI	DAR	RCH	DOV	CLT; DNQ	MAR	CAR	HCY	N/A	0	

=== CARS Super Late Model Tour ===
(key)

CARS Super Late Model Tour results
Year	Team	No.	Make	1	2	3	4	5	6	7	8	9	CSLMTC	Pts	Ref
2018	N/A	27	N/A	MYB	NSH	ROU	HCY	BRI	AND; 20	HCY	ROU	SBO	N/A	0	
2019	N/A	45	Chevy	SNM	HCY	NSH; 26	MMS	BRI	HCY; 18	ROU	SBO		46th	15	
2021	Lee Tissot	27	Chevy	HCY	GPS; 20	NSH	JEN	HCY; 7	MMS	TCM; 14	SBO		18th	45	

=== CARS Pro Late Model Tour ===
(key)

CARS Pro Late Model Tour results
Year	Team	No.	Make	1	2	3	4	5	6	7	8	9	10	11	12	13	CPLMTC	Pts	Ref
2022	Tissot Racing	27	Chevy	CRW	HCY	GPS; 14	FCS	TCM	HCY; 10	ACE	MMS	TCM; 6	ACE	SBO	CRW; 13		13th	89	
2023	Tissot Racing	27	Chevy	SNM	HCY; 12	ACE; 10	NWS; 27	TCM; 13	DIL	CRW	WKS	HCY	TCM; 15	SBO	TCM	CRW	21st	88	
2026	Tissot Racing	27	N/A	SNM	NSV	CRW	ACE	NWS	HCY	AND	FLC	TCM	NPS; 14	SBO			59th	28	

=== IHRA Late Model Sportsman Series ===
(key) (Bold – Pole position awarded by qualifying time. Italics – Pole position earned by points standings or practice time. * – Most laps led. ** – All laps led.)

IHRA Late Model Sportsman Series
Year	Team	No.	Make	1	2	3	ISCSS	Pts	Ref
2026	Tissot Racing	27	N/A	DUB; 28	CDL; 7	AND; 16	12th	90	
