= Dylan Ward =

American racing driver (born 1993)

- Born: August 19, 1993 (age 33) Winston-Salem, North Carolina, U.S.

CARS Late Model Stock Tour career
- Debut season: 2021
- Years active: 2021–present
- Starts: 20
- Championships: 0
- Wins: 0
- Poles: 0
- Best finish: 23rd in 2022
- Statistics up to date as of October 21, 2025.

Dylan Ward (born August 19, 1993) is an American professional stock car racing driver. He currently competes in the zMAX CARS Tour, driving the No. 70 for Dylan Ward Racing. He is the brother of fellow racing driver Trevor Ward, who also competes in the series.

Ward has also competed in series such as the SMART Modified Tour, the Virginia Late Model Triple Crown Series, the Carolina Pro Late Model Series, and the NASCAR Weekly Series, and is a frequent competitor at Bowman Gray Stadium.

== Motorsports results ==
=== CARS Late Model Stock Car Tour ===
(key) (Bold – Pole position awarded by qualifying time. Italics – Pole position earned by points standings or practice time. * – Most laps led. ** – All laps led.)

CARS Late Model Stock Car Tour results
Year	Team	No.	Make	1	2	3	4	5	6	7	8	9	10	11	12	13	14	15	16	17	CLMSCTC	Pts	Ref
2021	Dylan Ward Racing	7	Chevy	DIL	HCY	OCS	ACE; 12	CRW; 17	LGY	DOM	HCY	MMS	TCM	FLC	WKS	SBO					30th	37	
2022	Dylan Ward Racing	7	Chevy	CRW; 29	HCY; 18	GRE	AAS	FCS; 27	LGY	DOM		ACE; 23	MMS	NWS	TCM	ACE; 16	SBO	CRW; 8			23rd	86	
2022	Dylan Ward Racing	77	Chevy								HCY; 24										23rd	86	
2023	N/A	14	Chevy	SNM	FLC	HCY	ACE; 20	NWS	LGY	DOM											32nd	75	
2023	Dylan Ward Racing	7	Chevy								CRW; 29	HCY	ACE; 22	TCM; 24	WKS	AAS	SBO	TCM; 13	CRW; 14		32nd	75	
2024	Dylan Ward Racing	7	Chevy	SNM	HCY	AAS	OCS	ACE; 22	TCM	LGY	DOM	CRW; 8	HCY	NWS	ACE; 21	WCS	FLC	SBO			N/A	0	
2024	Dylan Ward Racing	7W	Chevy																TCM; 28	NWS	N/A	0	
2025	Dylan Ward Racing	7W	Chevy	AAS	WCS	CDL	OCS	ACE	NWS	LGY	DOM	CRW; 15	HCY	AND	FLC	SBO	TCM	NWS			70th	27	
2026	Dylan Ward Racing	70	Chevy	SNM	WCS	NSV	CRW; DNQ	ACE	LGY	DOM	NWS	HCY	AND	FLC	TCM	NPS	SBO				101st	5	

=== CARS Pro Late Model Tour ===
(key)

CARS Pro Late Model Tour results
Year	Team	No.	Make	1	2	3	4	5	6	7	8	9	10	11	12	CPLMTC	Pts	Ref
2022	Dylan Ward Racing	7	Chevy	CRW; 15	HCY	GPS	FCS	TCM	HCY	ACE	MMS	TCM	ACE	SBO	CRW	52nd	18	

=== SMART Modified Tour ===
SMART Modified Tour results
Year	Car owner	No.	Make	1	2	3	4	5	6	7	8	9	10	11	12	SMTC	Pts	Ref
2021	N/A	7	N/A	CRW	FLO	SBO	FCS	CRW	DIL	CAR	CRW	DOM	PUL	HCY; 11	ACE; 19	42nd	20	

=== IHRA Late Model Sportsman Series ===
(key) (Bold – Pole position awarded by qualifying time. Italics – Pole position earned by points standings or practice time. * – Most laps led. ** – All laps led.)

IHRA Late Model Sportsman Series
Year	Team	No.	Make	1	2	3	ISCSS	Pts	Ref
2026	Dylan Ward Racing	7W	Chevy	DUB; 10	CDL; 11	AND	N/A	0	
