= Michael Hinde =

American racing driver

- Born: April 19, 2004 (age 22) Hernando, Florida, U.S.

CARS Late Model Stock Tour career
- Debut season: 2025
- Years active: 2025–present
- Starts: 1
- Championships: 0
- Wins: 0
- Poles: 0
- Best finish: 56th in 2025
- Statistics up to date as of March 13, 2026.

Michael Hinde (born April 19, 2004) is an American professional stock car racing driver. He currently competes in the zMAX CARS Tour and the ASA STARS National Tour, driving the No. 69 for his own team.

Hinde has also competed in series such as the CRA JEGS All-Stars Tour, the ASA Southern Super Series, the ASA Midwest Tour, the World Series of Asphalt Stock Car Racing, and the NASCAR Weekly Series.

== Motorsports results ==
=== Stock car career summary ===
Season	Series	Team	Races	Wins	Top 5	Top 10	Points	Position
2022	CARS Pro Late Model Tour	N/A	1	0	0	1	26	40th
2023	ASA STARS National Tour	Mike Hinde	6	0	0	1	233	12th
2023	CARS Pro Late Model Tour	N/A	0	0	0	0	2	75th
2024	ASA STARS National Tour	Mike Hinde	5	0	0	1	178	18th
2025	ASA STARS National Tour	Mike Hinde	2	0	0	0	65	42nd
2025	CARS Late Model Stock Car Tour	Lee Pulliam Performance	1	0	0	1	34	56th
2026	ASA STARS National Tour	Mike Hinde	1	0	0	1		

=== CARS Late Model Stock Car Tour ===
(key) (Bold – Pole position awarded by qualifying time. Italics – Pole position earned by points standings or practice time. * – Most laps led. ** – All laps led.)

CARS Late Model Stock Car Tour results
Year	Team	No.	Make	1	2	3	4	5	6	7	8	9	10	11	12	13	14	15	CLMSCTC	Pts	Ref
2025	Lee Pulliam Performance	69	N/A	AAS	WCS	CDL; 8	OCS	ACE	NWS	LGY	DOM	CRW	HCY	AND	FLC	SBO	TCM	NWS	56th	34	

=== CARS Pro Late Model Tour ===
(key)

CARS Pro Late Model Tour results
Year	Team	No.	Make	1	2	3	4	5	6	7	8	9	10	11	12	13	CPLMTC	Pts	Ref
2022	N/A	69	Chevy	CRW	HCY	GPS	FCS	TCM; 7	HCY	ACE	MMS	TCM	ACE	SBO	CRW		40th	26	
2023	N/A	69	Toyota	SNM	HCY	ACE	NWS; DNQ	TCM	DIL	CRW	WKS	HCY	TCM	SBO	TCM	CRW	75th	2	

=== ASA STARS National Tour ===
(key) (Bold – Pole position awarded by qualifying time. Italics – Pole position earned by points standings or practice time. * – Most laps led. ** – All laps led.)

ASA STARS National Tour results
Year	Team	No.	Make	1	2	3	4	5	6	7	8	9	10	11	12	ASNTC	Pts	Ref
2023	Mike Hinde	69	Toyota	FIF; 11	MAD	NWS; 15	HCY; 10	MLW	AND; 13	WIR	TOL	WIN; 20	NSV; 16			12th	233	
2024	Mike Hinde	69	Toyota	NSM; 29	FIF; 6	HCY; 14	MAD	MLW	AND	OWO	TOL	WIN; 14	NSV; 25			18th	178	
2025	Mike Hinde	69	Toyota	NSM; 19	FIF	DOM	HCY	NPS	MAD	SLG	AND	OWO	TOL	WIN	NSV; 23	42nd	65	
2026	Mike Hinde	69	Toyota	NSM; 10	FIF; DNS	HCY	SLG	MAD	NPS	OWO	TRI	WIN	NSV	NSM		-*	-*	
