= Logan Jones (disambiguation) =

Logan Jones (born 2001) is an American football player.

Logan Jones may also refer to:

- Logan Jones (racing driver), American racing driver
- Logan Jones, character in Palmetto Pointe
- Logan Jones, character in Zoo (American TV series)
- J. Logan Jones, founder of The Jones Store
