= Bobby McCarty =

American racing driver (born 1992)

- Born: September 28, 1992 (age 34); Summerfield, North Carolina, U.S.
- Achievements: 2018, 2019, 2021 CARS Late Model Stock Tour Champion; 2021 Virginia Late Model Triple Crown Series Champion; 2021, 2023 Thunder Road 200 Winner; 2017 Hampton Heat 200 Winner; 2019 Thanksgiving All-Star Classic Winner; 2020, 2021 Rodney Cook Classic Winner

NASCAR O'Reilly Auto Parts Series career
- 1 race run over 1 year
- Best finish: 69th (2022)
- First race: 2022 Food City 300 (Bristol)
Wins	Top tens	Poles
0	0	0
- Statistics up to date as of June 24, 2023.

Bobby McCarty (born September 28, 1992) is an American professional stock car racing driver. He currently competes part-time in the CARS Late Model Stock Tour and other late model events, driving the No. 6 Chevrolet Camaro for McCarty Motorsports.

== Racing career ==
=== CARS Late Model Stock Tour ===
In 2018, McCarty would run his first full-time season in the series, signing with Nelson Motorsports. He would manage to earn his first victory at the first race of the season at Tri-County Motor Speedway. By the seventh race of the twelve-race season, he would manage to score three more wins. By season's end, he had managed to lock up the championship, scoring his first championship in the series.

In 2019, McCarty would run full-time again for Nelson Motorsports. Despite having a self-called "up-and-down" season according to McCarty, by the final race at South Boston Speedway, he had managed to pull a nine-point lead over Josh Berry. At race's end, he had managed to win his second straight championship in the series.

During the 2021 CARS Late Model Stock Tour season, McCarty would manage to hold off Kaden Honeycutt in the final race at South Boston Speedway to take his third Late Model Stock division title.

=== NASCAR Xfinity Series ===
On July 4, 2022, McCarty would announce that he would attempt to make his debut in the NASCAR Xfinity Series at the 2022 Crayon 200 at New Hampshire Motor Speedway, driving the No. 47 Chevrolet for Mike Harmon Racing. However, McCarty would fail to qualify for the race, becoming the only non-qualifier for the race. Later in the season, he would make his official debut driving the No. 6 Chevrolet for JD Motorsports, qualifying by using an owner's points provisional in the last position, which was 38th. McCarty would eventually manage to finish in 31st.

== Motorsports career results ==
=== NASCAR ===
(key) (Bold – Pole position awarded by qualifying time. Italics – Pole position earned by points standings or practice time. * – Most laps led. ** – All laps led.)

==== Xfinity Series ====
NASCAR Xfinity Series results
Year	Team	No.	Make	1	2	3	4	5	6	7	8	9	10	11	12	13	14	15	16	17	18	19	20	21	22	23	24	25	26	27	28	29	30	31	32	33	NXSC	Pts	Ref
2022	Mike Harmon Racing	47	Chevy	DAY	CAL	LVS	PHO	ATL	COA	RCH	MAR	TAL	DOV	DAR	TEX	CLT	POR	NSH	ROA	ATL	NHA; DNQ	POC	IND	MCH	GLN	DAY	DAR	KAN									69th	6	
2022	JD Motorsports	6	Chevy																										BRI; 31	TEX	TAL	CLT	LVS	HOM	MAR	PHO	69th	6	

=== CARS Late Model Stock Car Tour ===
(key) (Bold – Pole position awarded by qualifying time. Italics – Pole position earned by points standings or practice time. * – Most laps led. ** – All laps led.)

CARS Late Model Stock Car Tour results
Year	Team	No.	Make	1	2	3	4	5	6	7	8	9	10	11	12	13	14	15	16	17	CLMSCTC	Pts	Ref
2017	Nelson Motorsports	22	Toyota	CON	DOM	DOM	HCY	HCY	BRI	AND	ROU	TCM	ROU	HCY	CON	SBO; 4					39th	29	
2018	Nelson Motorsports	22M	Toyota	TCM; 1*	MYB; 5	ROU; 3	HCY; 1	BRI; 7	**ACE**; 1**	CCS; 1	KPT; 7		WKS; 7*	ROU; 5	SBO; 9						1st	361	
2018	Nelson Motorsports	77	Toyota									HCY; 4									1st	361	
2019	Nelson Motorsports	22	Toyota	SNM; 4	HCY; 5	ROU; 13	ACE; 4*	MMS; 1	LGY; 2	**DOM**; 2*	CCS; 12	HCY; 3	ROU; 1*	SBO; 2							1st	325	
2020	Nelson Motorsports	22	Toyota	SNM; 10	**ACE**; 18*	HCY; 7	HCY; 1**	DOM; 11	FCS; 4	LGY; 6	CCS; 5	FLO; 13	GRE; 6								4th	256	
2021	Nelson Motorsports	22	Toyota	DIL; 8	HCY; 6	OCS; 1	**ACE**; 2	CRW; 4*	LGY; 17	DOM; 7		MMS; 1*	TCM; 3	FLC; 8	**WKS**; 6	SBO; 1*					1st	377	
2021	Nelson Motorsports	07	Chevy								HCY; 6										1st	377	
2022	Nelson Motorsports	22	Toyota	CRW; 16	HCY; 8		AAS; 8														7th	305	
2022	Nelson Motorsports	22	Chevy			GPS; 19		FCS; 25	LGY; 8	DOM; 7		ACE; 5	MMS; 4	NWS; 5	TCM; 25	ACE; 21	SBO; 9	CRW; 5			7th	305	
2022	Nelson Motorsports	11	Chevy								HCY; 26										7th	305	
2023	R&S Race Cars	6	Ford	SNM; 10	FLC; 7	HCY; 30	ACE; 5	NWS; 28	LGY; 6	DOM; 1	CRW; 5	HCY; 5	ACE; 24	TCM; 4	WKS; 7	AAS; 12	SBO; 3	TCM; 6	CRW; 2		4th	375	
2024	R&S Race Cars	6	Ford	SNM; 10	HCY; 6	AAS; 1	OCS; 24*	ACE; 4	TCM; 20	LGY; 8	DOM; 21	CRW; 16	HCY; 2	NWS	**ACE**; 18	WCS	FLC; 12	SBO; 10	TCM	NWS	8th	287	
2025	McCarty Motorsports	6	Ford	AAS; 2	WCS	CDL	OCS; 30	ACE	NWS	LGY	DOM	CRW	HCY	AND	FLC	SBO	TCM	NWS			42nd	53	

=== SMART Modified Tour ===
SMART Modified Tour results
Year	Car owner	No.	Make	1	2	3	4	5	6	7	8	9	10	11	12	SMTC	Pts	Ref
2021	Hill Enterprises	79	N/A	CRW	FLO	SBO	FCS	CRW	DIL	CAR	CRW	DOM; 14	PUL	HCY	ACE	47th	17	
