= Trevor Ward (racing driver) =

American racing driver (born 1997)

- Born: Trevor Dalton Ward; October 2, 1997 (age 29) Winston-Salem, North Carolina, U.S.

CARS Late Model Stock Tour career
- Debut season: 2017
- Years active: 2017–2025
- Starts: 48
- Championships: 0
- Wins: 0
- Poles: 2
- Best finish: 12th in 2019
- Statistics up to date as of October 19, 2025.

Trevor Dalton Ward (born October 2, 1997) is an American professional stock car racing driver. He last competed in the zMAX CARS Tour, driving the No. 12 for Nelson Motorsports. He is longtime competitor in the series, having made his debut in 2017 and having earned eight top-ten finishes with a best points finish of twelfth in 2019. He is the brother of fellow racing driver Dylan Ward who also competes in Late Model racing, and the son of Dean Ward, who has previously competed in the NASCAR Whelen Southern Modified Tour and the SMART Modified Tour.

Ward is a former champion of the Virginia Late Model Triple Crown, having won the title in 2023 by virtue of his win in the ValleyStar Credit Union 300.

Before the 2026 season, Ward competed in Kaulig Racing's "Race For the Seat", competing against 14 other drivers to try to win a full-season ride in the teams No. 14 truck.

Ward has also competed in the Rodney Cook Classic at Ace Speedway, where he won in 2023, the NASCAR Weekly Series, the Mid-Atlantic Limited Late Model Series, and the 602 Super Limited Series.

== Motorsports results ==
=== CARS Late Model Stock Car Tour ===
(key) (Bold – Pole position awarded by qualifying time. Italics – Pole position earned by points standings or practice time. * – Most laps led. ** – All laps led.)

CARS Late Model Stock Car Tour results
Year	Team	No.	Make	1	2	3	4	5	6	7	8	9	10	11	12	13	14	15	16	17	CLMSCTC	Pts	Ref
2017	Trevor Ward Motorsports	77W	N/A	CON	DOM	DOM	HCY	HCY	BRI	AND	ROU	TCM	ROU	HCY	CON	SBO; 13					51st	20	
2018	Trevor Ward Motorsports	77	Chevy	TCM; 18	MYB; 26	ROU; 18	HCY; 13	BRI; 13	ACE; 5	CCS; 15	KPT; 11	HCY; DNQ	WKS	ROU	SBO; 7						14th	173	
2019	Trevor Ward Motorsports	77	Chevy	SNM; 18	HCY; 14	ROU; 7	ACE; 18	MMS; 16	LGY; 20	DOM; 22	CCS; 6		ROU; 21	SBO; 13							12th	181	
2019	Trevor Ward Motorsports	02	Chevy									HCY; 28									12th	181	
2020	Trevor Ward Motorsports	77	Chevy	SNM; 21	ACE; 13	HCY; 15	HCY; 4	DOM	FCS	LGY	CCS; 17	FLO	GRE								18th	95	
2021	Trevor Ward Motorsports	77	Chevy	DIL	HCY	OCS	ACE; 15	CRW; 9	LGY	DOM	HCY	MMS	TCM	FLC	WKS	SBO					28th	42	
2022	Hedgecock Racing Enterprises	41	Chevy	CRW; 15	HCY; 13	GRE	AAS														20th	138	
2022	Trevor Ward Motorsports	77W	Chevy					FCS; 19	LGY	DOM						ACE; 24	SBO; 14	**CRW**; 13*			20th	138	
2022	N/A	10	Ford								HCY; 15										20th	138	
2022	Trevor Ward Motorsports	10W	Chevy									ACE; 16	MMS	NWS	TCM						20th	138	
2023	Trevor Ward Motorsports	77W	Chevy	SNM	FLC	HCY; DNQ					CRW; 23	HCY	ACE; 9	TCM	WKS	AAS	SBO; 9	TCM	CRW; 12		27th	85	
2023	Lee Faulk Racing	55	Toyota				ACE; 28	NWS	LGY	DOM											27th	85	
2024	Trevor Ward Motorsports	77W	Chevy	SNM; 28	HCY	AAS	OCS	ACE	TCM	LGY	DOM	CRW	HCY	NWS	ACE	WCS	FLC	SBO	TCM	NWS; 23	N/A	0	
2025	Nelson Motorsports	12	N/A	AAS	WCS	CDL	OCS	ACE	NWS	LGY	DOM	**CRW**; 21	HCY; 21	AND	FLC		TCM; 21	NWS; 6			26th	136	
2025	Nelson Motorsports	12T	N/A													SBO; 9					26th	136	

=== CARS Pro Late Model Tour ===
(key)

CARS Pro Late Model Tour results
Year	Team	No.	Make	1	2	3	4	5	6	7	8	9	10	11	CPLMTC	Pts	Ref
2026	Bryson Lopez Racing	47	Chevy	SNM	NSV	CRW	ACE	NWS	HCY	AND	FLC	TCM	NPS	SBO; 10	49th	32	
