= 2021 CARS Tour =

25th season of the CARS Tour

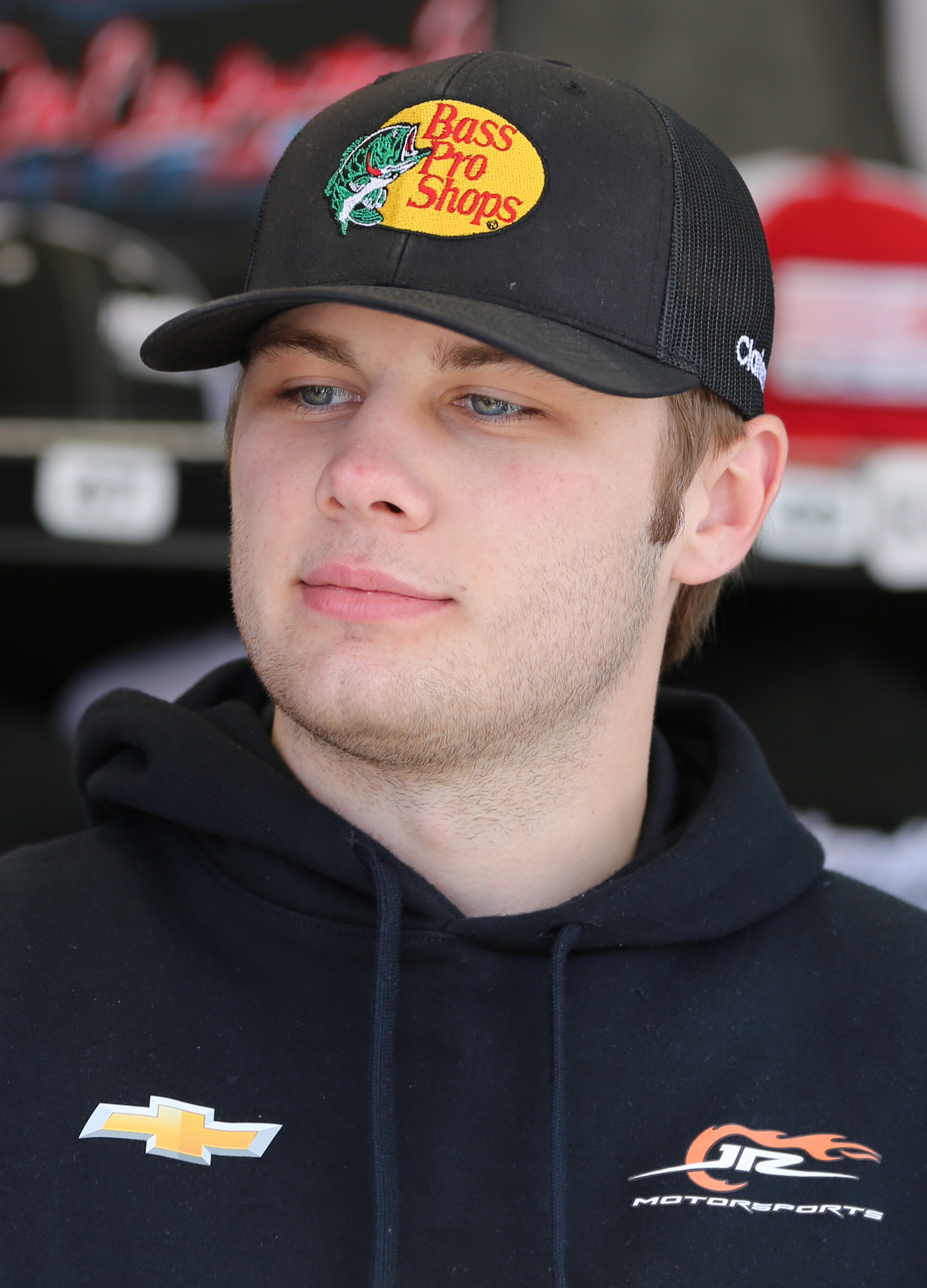
Carson Kvapil, the 2021 Super Late Model Tour champion.

The 2021 CARS Tour was the 25th season of the Solid Rock Carriers CARS Tour, a stock car racing series. It began at Dillon Motor Speedway on March 9 and ended at South Boston Speedway on October 16. Bobby McCarty won the Late Model Stock Tour championship, while Carson Kvapil won the Super Late Model Tour championship.

Jared Fryar entered the season as the defending Late Model Stock Tour champion, while Matt Craig entered as the defending Super Late Model Tour champion.

This was the last season to include the Super Late Model Tour, which was replaced by the Pro Late Model Tour following the conclusion of the season.

== Schedule & results ==
Date	Track	Location	LMSC Winner	SLM Winner
March 6	Dillon Motor Speedway	Dillon, South Carolina	Justin Johnson	N/A
March 20	Hickory Motor Speedway	Hickory, North Carolina	Bobby McCarty	Carson Kvapil
April 10	Greenville-Pickens Speedway	Greenville, South Carolina	N/A	Stephen Nasse
April 25	Orange County Speedway	Rougemont, North Carolina	Josh Berry	N/A
May 7	Ace Speedway	Altamahaw, North Carolina	Layne Riggs	N/A
May 8	Nashville Fairgrounds Speedway	Nashville, Tennessee	N/A	Carson Kvapil
May 22	Caraway Speedway	Asheboro, North Carolina	Justin Johnson	N/A
June 5	Langley Speedway	Hampton, Virginia	Kaden Honeycutt	N/A
June 19	Dominion Raceway	Thornburg, Virginia	Daniel Silvestri	N/A
July 3	Jennerstown Speedway	Jennerstown, Pennsylvania	N/A	Sammy Smith
July 31	Hickory Motor Speedway	Hickory, North Carolina	Josh Berry	Matt Craig
August 28	Pulaski County Motorsports Park	Radford, Virginia	Bobby McCarty	Carson Kvapil
September 11	Tri-County Motor Speedway	Hudson, North Carolina	Mini Tyrrell	Chandler Smith
October 2	Florence Motor Speedway	Timmonsville, South Carolina	Kaden Honeycutt	N/A
October 10	Wake County Speedway	Raleigh, North Carolina	Deac McCaskill	N/A
October 16	South Boston Speedway	South Boston, Virginia	Bobby McCarty	Carson Kvapil

== Standings ==
=== Late Model Stock Car championship ===
(key) Bold – Pole position awarded by time. Italics – Pole position set by final practice results or rainout. * – Most laps led.

Pos	Driver	DIL	HCY	OCS	ACE	CRW	LGY	DOM	HCY	MMS	TCM	FLC	WKS	SBO	Points
1	Bobby McCarty	8	1*	6	**2**	4*	17	7	6	1*	3	8	**6**	1*	377
2	Kaden Honeycutt	12	9	10	7	3	**1****	3	7	4	4	1	5	7	364
3	Jared Fryar	4	11	4	4	13	5	4	5	11	5	7	4	8	344
4	Justin Johnson	1	10	**25**	3	1	2	5	13	2	7	3	13	14	337
5	Deac McCaskill	9	4	2	14	2	3	21	10	14	14	10	1*	9	321
6	Sam Yarbrough	6	16	9	11	6	7	9	3	7	2	12	8	23	311
7	Jonathan Shafer	18	17	23	5	12	8	15	11	5	6	14	3	4	288
8	Brandon Pierce	13	12	11	8	5	11	10	17	12	13	2	7	21	287
9	Mini Tyrrell	17	7	13	19	14	6	6	4*	19	**1***	15	11	18	285
10	Layne Riggs	2*	**18**	21	1*	19	4	19	15	17	19	5	2	16	278
11	Conner Jones	11	23	14	17	16	10	11	9	9	12	19	15	22	241
12	Daniel Silvestri	16	5	12	13	11	9	1*	24	10				2	230
13	Mason Diaz	10	22	22	16	8	15	8	2		15		14	5	227
14	Joe Valento	21	15	26	9	10	16	14	21	18	11	16	17	13	222
15	Jonathan Findley	20	6	24	10	7	19	20	14	20	20	18	16	DNS	202
16	Mike Looney	7	13	19		**20**		**2**	16	3	8			15	201
17	Sam Butler	3	3	28	6	18	12	22	8						164
18	Tyler Matthews		2	3				13	19		16	13			133
19	Josh Berry			1*		22			**1**	6					108
20	Craig Moore	19		27				18	12					10	79
21	William Cox III	14	8	17	18										75
22	Connor Mosack								18			9		17	55
23	Stephen Nasse			5							9				52
24	Mike Darne								22	16		11			50
25	Carter Langley										10			6	50
26	Timothy Peters	**5**					20		27						49
27	Jessica Cann	15	21	18											45
28	Trevor Ward				15	9									42
29	Ronald Hill			16										11	37
30	Dylan Ward				12	17									37
31	Terry Carroll						14	16							36
32	Bubba Pollard			7					25						34
33	Connor Hall													**3**	32
34	Carson Kvapil											4*			30
35	Rusty Skewes							17		21					28
36	Ryan Glenski											6			27
37	Mitch Walker								23		17				26
38	Kyle Dudley									**8**					26
39	Trevor Noles			8											25
40	Andrew Grady												9		24
41	Ethan Johnson												10		23
42	Grant Thompson							12							21
43	Daniel Vuncannon												12		21
44	Bryant Barnhill													12	21
45	Justin S. Carroll						13								20
46	Chase Purdy									13					20
47	Chase Dixon		19						28						19
48	Justin Carroll		14												19
49	Coy Beard					15									18
50	Zack Miracle											**17**			18
51	Camden Gullie			15											18
52	Jake Crum									15					18
53	Braden Rogers										18				15
54	Matt Waltz						18								15
55	Taylor Gray													19	14
56	Cory Dunn													20	13
57	Sammy Smith			20											13
58	Landon Huffman								20						13
59	Michael Bumgarner											20			13
60	Jack Wood		20												13
61	Isaac Bevin										21				12
62	Jason York					21									12
63	Dillon Houser										22				11
64	Matt Leicht		24												9
65	Austin Thaxton													24	9
66	Ryan Millington								26						7
67	Zane Smith								29						4
Pos	Driver	DIL	HCY	OCS	ACE	CRW	LGY	DOM	HCY	MMS	TCM	FLC	WKS	SBO	Points

=== Super Late Model Tour championship ===
(key) Bold – Pole position awarded by time. Italics – Pole position set by final practice results or rainout. * – Most laps led.

Pos	Driver	HCY	GPS	NSH	JEN	HCY	MMS	TCM	SBO	Points
1	Carson Kvapil	**1**	2*	**1****	17*	4	1*	6	**1****	253
2	Matt Craig	2*	4	2	3	**1***	3	3	3	252
3	Jeff Batten	9	10	20	9	10	5	12	6	183
4	Justin Crider	6	12	22	13	11	**7**	11	5	178
5	Kodie Conner	13		12	8				4	95
6	Kyle Plott		9			5	6	8		80
7	Sammy Smith		3	5	1			20		75
8	Michael Ritch	8				8	9			74
9	Chandler Smith		5			2		1		65
10	Stephen Nasse		1	3	5			**2***		62
11	Ryan Moore	3							2	61
12	Jake Garcia		15	4			2	4		60
13	Garrett Hall	5			6					55
14	T. J. Duke	4	8							54
15	Garrett Smithley		11		4					51
16	Bubba Pollard				16	3				47
17	Brandon Setzer	14				6				46
18	Lee Tissot		20			7		14		45
19	Tyler Church					12		19		35
20	Corey Heim				2					32
21	Giovanni Bromante						4			29
22	Josh Berry				**7**					28
23	Jeremy Barclay	12		27						27
24	Ben Rowe	7								26
25	Jeff Fultz		7							26
26	J. R. Courage								7	26
27	Austin MacDonald						8			25
28	Daniel Webster					9				24
29	Albert Francis				10					23
30	Jake Keaton						10			23
31	Jacob Perry	10								23
32	Grant Enfinger						11			22
33	Derek Griffith				11					22
34	Mike Hopkins	11								22
35	Terry Senneker				14*					21
36	Chris Davidson				12					21
37	Jeff Vrsek				15					18
38	Ethan Myers				18					15
39	Jett Noland		**6**	11				10		
40	Jackson Boone			7				7		
41	Hunter Robbins			19				5		
42	Jake Finch			16				9		
43	Kyle Bryant			15				13		
44	Hudson Halder		16	26						
45	Dusty Williams			25				18		
46	Hunter Jack			6						
47	Jeremy Pate			8						
48	Cody Coughlin			9						
49	Dalton Armstrong			10						
50	Michael Simko			13						
51	Nick Neri		13							
52	Scott Tomasik			14						
53	Randy Gentry		14							
54	Daniel Dye							15		
55	Tyler Tanner							16		
56	Michael House			17						
57	Mike Garrett		17							
58	William Sawalich							**17**		
59	Perry Patino		18							
60	Jonny Brazier			18						
61	Zane Smith		19							
62	Connor Okrzesik		21							
63	Kyle Reid			21						
64	Travis Benjamin			23						
65	Jesse Love			24						
Pos	Driver	HCY	GPS	NSH	JEN	HCY	MMS	TCM	SBO	Points

== See also ==
- 2021 NASCAR Cup Series
- 2021 NASCAR Xfinity Series
- 2021 NASCAR Camping World Truck Series
- 2021 ARCA Menards Series
- 2021 ARCA Menards Series East
- 2021 ARCA Menards Series West
- 2021 NASCAR Whelen Modified Tour
- 2021 NASCAR Pinty's Series
- 2021 NASCAR Whelen Euro Series
- 2021 eNASCAR iRacing Pro Invitational Series
- 2021 SRX Series
- 2021 Southern Modified Auto Racing Teams season
