= Zack Miracle =

American racing driver

- Born: May 9, 2006 (age 20) Indian Trail, North Carolina, U.S.

CARS Late Model Stock Tour career
- Debut season: 2021
- Years active: 2021–2023
- Starts: 23
- Championships: 0
- Wins: 0
- Poles: 1
- Best finish: 11th in 2022
- Statistics up to date as of October 7, 2025.

Zack Miracle (born May 9, 2006) is an American professional stock car racing driver who previously competed in the zMAX CARS Tour from 2021 to 2023.

Miracle has also competed in the Virginia Late Model Triple Crown Series, the Paramount Kia Big 10 Challenge, the INEX Summer Shootout Series, and the NASCAR Weekly Series.

== Motorsports results ==
=== CARS Late Model Stock Car Tour ===
(key) (Bold – Pole position awarded by qualifying time. Italics – Pole position earned by points standings or practice time. * – Most laps led. ** – All laps led.)

CARS Late Model Stock Car Tour results
Year	Team	No.	Make	1	2	3	4	5	6	7	8	9	10	11	12	13	14	15	16	CLMSCTC	Pts	Ref
2021	Miracle Motorsports	32	Chevy	DIL	HCY	ROU	ACE	CRW	LGY	DOM	HCY	MMS	TCM	**FLC**; 17	WKS	SBO				50th	18	
2022	Miracle Motorsports	32	Toyota	CRW; 28	HCY; 23	GPS; 15	AAS; 19	FCS; 6	LGY; 10	DOM; 16		ACE; 14	MMS; 14	NWS; 7	TCM; 3	ACE; 22	SBO; 5	CRW; 16		11th	290	
2022	N/A	8M	Chevy								HCY; 7									11th	290	
2023	Miracle Motorsports	32	Chevy	SNM; 20	FLC; 14	HCY; 22	ACE; 16	NWS; 9	LGY	DOM	CRW	HCY; 13	ACE	TCM	WKS	AAS	SBO	TCM	CRW; 24	24th	113	
