= Brandon Pierce =

American racing driver

- Born: February 24, 1996 (age 30) Oak Ridge, North Carolina, U.S.

CARS Late Model Stock Tour career
- Debut season: 2017
- Years active: 2017–present
- Starts: 114
- Championships: 0
- Wins: 1
- Poles: 2
- Best finish: 4th in 2019
- Statistics up to date as of July 17, 2026.

Brandon Pierce (born February 24, 1996) is an American professional stock car racing driver. He currently competes in the zMAX CARS Tour, driving the No. 2 Chevrolet for KP Speed Motorsports. He is a longtime competitor in the series, having made his debut in 2017, and having won one race at Southern National Motorsports Park in 2019. He has previously driven for Lee Pulliam Performance and Carroll Speedshop.

Pierce is a former student at Guilford Technical Community College.

Pierce has also competed in the Virginia Late Model Triple Crown Series and the NASCAR Weekly Series.

== Motorsports results ==
=== CARS Late Model Stock Car Tour ===
(key) (Bold – Pole position awarded by qualifying time. Italics – Pole position earned by points standings or practice time. * – Most laps led. ** – All laps led.)

CARS Late Model Stock Car Tour results
Year	Team	No.	Make	1	2	3	4	5	6	7	8	9	10	11	12	13	14	15	16	17	CLMSCTC	Pts	Ref
2017	Vann Pierce	2	Toyota	CON	DOM	DOM	HCY	HCY	BRI	AND	ROU	TCM	ROU	HCY	CON	SBO; 12					49th	21	
2018	Nelson Motorsports	2P	Ford	TCM; 20																	9th	247	
2018	Vann Pierce	2P	Ford		MYB; 10																9th	247	
2018	Vann Pierce	2P	Toyota			**ROU**; 2	HCY; 17	BRI	ACE; 18	CCS; 3	KPT; 10	HCY; 18	WKS; 8	ROU; 7	SBO; 5						9th	247	
2019	Lee Pulliam Performance	2	Chevy	**SNM**; 1	HCY; 15	ROU; 5	ACE; 16	MMS; 4	LGY; 14	DOM; 3	CCS; 13		ROU; 12	SBO; 16							4th	460	
2019	Lee Pulliam Performance	1	Chevy									HCY; 7									4th	460	
2020	Lee Pulliam Performance	2	Chevy	SNM; 16	ACE; 9	HCY; 8	HCY; 12	DOM; 3	FCS; 19	LGY; 17	CCS; 7	FLO	GRE; 17								10th	189	
2021	Lee Pulliam Performance	2	Chevy	DIL; 13	HCY; 12	OCS; 11	ACE; 8	CRW; 5	LGY; 11	DOM; 10		MMS; 12	TCM; 13	FLC; 2	WKS; 7	SBO; 21					8th	287	
2021	Lee Pulliam Performance	49	Chevy								HCY; 17										8th	287	
2022	Lee Pulliam Performance	2	Chevy	CRW; 10	HCY; 6	GPS; 10	AAS; 20	FCS; 11	LGY; 12	DOM; 12		ACE; 15	MMS; 21	NWS; 10	TCM; 10	ACE; 23	SBO; 11	CRW; 10			6th	308	
2022	Lee Pulliam Performance	02	Chevy								HCY; 6										6th	308	
2023	Lee Pulliam Performance	2	Chevy	SNM; 14	FLC; 16	HCY; 14	ACE; 10	NWS; 18	LGY; 11	DOM; 11	CRW; 17		ACE; 23	TCM; 12	WKS; 12	AAS; 11	SBO; 19	TCM; 27	CRW; 8		10th	297	
2023	Lee Pulliam Performance	88S	Chevy									HCY; 8									10th	297	
2024	Carroll Speedshop	2	Chevy	SNM; 16	HCY; 14	AAS; 19	OCS; 20	ACE; 11	TCM; 27	LGY; 21	DOM; 13	CRW; 18	HCY; 22	NWS; 19	ACE; 13	WCS; 13	FLC; 24	SBO; 18	TCM; 19	NWS; 10	10th	264	
2025	Carroll Speedshop	2	Chevy	AAS; 25	WCS; 9	CDL; 22	OCS; 17	ACE; 20	NWS; 11	LGY; 14	DOM; 19	CRW; 16		AND; 17	FLC; 11	SBO; 16	TCM; 5	NWS; 19			14th	373	
2025	Carroll Speedshop	2P	Chevy										HCY; DNQ								14th	373	
2026	KP Speed Motorsports	2	Chevy	SNM; DNQ	WCS; 5	NSV; 25	CRW; 20	ACE; 22	LGY; 19	DOM; 13	NWS; 29	HCY	AND	FLC	TCM	NPS	SBO				23rd	166	
