= Logan Jones (racing driver) =

American racing driver

- Born: Fredericksburg, Virginia, U.S.

CARS Pro Late Model Tour career
- Debut season: 2022
- Years active: 2022–present
- Starts: 34
- Championships: 0
- Wins: 1
- Poles: 0
- Best finish: 4th in 2023
- Statistics up to date as of March 26, 2026.

Logan Jones (birth date unknown) is an American professional stock car racing driver. He currently competes in the zMAX CARS Tour, driving the No. 77 for Joey Jones Racing. He is a former winner of the Pro Late Model Tour, having won at Wake County Speedway in 2023.

Jones has also competed in series such as the Allison Legacy Race Series, the PASS Pro Late Model Series, the Central PA Legends Series, and the NASCAR Weekly Series.

== Motorsports results ==
=== CARS Late Model Stock Car Tour ===
(key) (Bold – Pole position awarded by qualifying time. Italics – Pole position earned by points standings or practice time. * – Most laps led. ** – All laps led.)

CARS Late Model Stock Car Tour results
Year	Team	No.	Make	1	2	3	4	5	6	7	8	9	10	11	12	13	CLMSCTC	Pts	Ref
2017	Joey Jones Racing	77	Chevy	CON; 21	DOM	DOM	HCY	HCY	BRI	AND	ROU	TCM	ROU	HCY	CON	SBO	65th	13	
2018	Joey Jones Racing	75	Chevy	TCM	MYB	ROU	HCY	BRI	ACE	CCS	KPT	HCY	WKS	OCS	SBO; 24		79th	9	
2020	Joey Jones Racing	77J	N/A	SNM	ACE	HCY	HCY	DOM; 20	FCS	LGY	CCS	FLO	GRE				49th	13	

=== CARS Pro Late Model Tour ===
(key)

CARS Pro Late Model Tour results
Year	Team	No.	Make	1	2	3	4	5	6	7	8	9	10	11	12	13	CPLMTC	Pts	Ref
2022	Joey Jones Racing	77	Chevy	CRW; 10	HCY; 6	GPS; 10	FCS; 6	TCM	HCY; 5	ACE	MMS; 11	TCM; 14	ACE	SBO; 9	CRW; 12		6th	214	
2023	Joey Jones Racing	77	Chevy	SNM; 10	HCY; 28	ACE; 11	NWS; 36	TCM; 9	DIL; 9	CRW; 10	WKS; 1		TCM; 10	SBO; 9	TCM; 4	CRW; 7	4th	282	
2023	Joey Jones Racing	53	Chevy									HCY; 10					4th	282	
2024	Joey Jones Racing	77	Chevy	SNM; 20	HCY; 28	OCS; 17	ACE; 9	TCM; 15	CRW	HCY	NWS; 15			SBO; 16	TCM		16th	126	
2024	Joey Jones Racing	77J	Chevy									ACE; 10	FLC				16th	126	
2024	Connor Jones Racing	44	N/A													NWS; 23	16th	126	
2025	Connor Jones Racing	44	N/A	AAS; 9	CDL; 27	OCS	ACE										32nd	63	
2025	Connor Jones Racing	45	N/A					NWS; 27	CRW	HCY	HCY	AND	FLC	SBO	TCM	NWS	32nd	63	
2026	Joey Jones Racing	77	N/A	SNM; 25	NSV	CRW	ACE	NWS	HCY	AND	FLC	TCM	NPS	SBO			75th	17	
