= Kyle Dudley =

American racing driver (born 1991)

- Born: M. Kyle Dudley; November 6, 1991 (age 35) Roanoke, Virginia, U.S.

CARS Late Model Stock Tour career
- Debut season: 2020
- Years active: 2020–2022, 2025–present
- Starts: 6
- Championships: 0
- Wins: 0
- Poles: 1
- Best finish: 28th in 2022
- Statistics up to date as of October 3, 2025.

M. Kyle Dudley (born November 6, 1991) is an American professional stock car racing driver. He currently competes in the IHRA Stock Car Series, driving the No. 4 Chevrolet for DT Racing.

Dudley has also competed in the Virginia Late Model Triple Crown Series, the Dirty Dozen Series, and the NASCAR Weekly Series, and is a multiple-time track champion at Franklin County Speedway, as well as a former track campion at Motor Mile Speedway.

== Motorsports results ==
=== CARS Late Model Stock Car Tour ===
(key) (Bold – Pole position awarded by qualifying time. Italics – Pole position earned by points standings or practice time. * – Most laps led. ** – All laps led.)

CARS Late Model Stock Car Tour results
Year	Team	No.	Make	1	2	3	4	5	6	7	8	9	10	11	12	13	14	15	CLMSCTC	Pts	Ref
2020	DT Racing	4D	Chevy	SNM	ACE	HCY	HCY	DOM	FCS; 15	LGY	CCS	FLO	GRE						43rd	18	
2021	DT Racing	4D	Chevy	DIL	HCY	OCS	ACE	CRW	LGY	DOM	HCY	**MMS**; 8	TCM	FLC	WKS	SBO			38th	26	
2022	DT Racing	4D	Chevy	CRW	HCY	GRE	AAS	FCS; 2	LGY	DOM	HCY	ACE	MMS; 22	NWS	TCM	ACE	SBO	CRW; 6	28th	69	
2025	DT Racing	4D	Chevy	AAS	WCS	CDL	OCS	ACE	NWS	LGY	DOM	CRW	HCY	AND	FLC	SBO; 26	TCM	NWS	94th	16	

=== IHRA Late Model Sportsman Series ===
(key) (Bold – Pole position awarded by qualifying time. Italics – Pole position earned by points standings or practice time. * – Most laps led. ** – All laps led.)

IHRA Late Model Sportsman Series
Year	Team	No.	Make	1	2	3	ISCSS	Pts	Ref
2026	DT Racing	4	Chevy	**DUB**; 1*	CDL	AND	N/A	0	
