= 2022 Food City 300 =

26th race of the 2022 NASCAR Xfinity Series

Race details
- Race 26 of 33 of the 2022 NASCAR Xfinity Series
- Date: September 16, 2022
- Official name: 41st Annual Food City 300
- Location: Bristol Motor Speedway, Bristol, Tennessee
- Course: Permanent racing facility
- Course length: 0.533 miles (0.858 km)
- Distance: 300 laps, 159.9 mi (257.3 km)
- Scheduled distance: 300 laps, 159.9 mi (257.3 km)
- Average speed: 80.996 mph (130.350 km/h)

Pole position
Driver	Ty Gibbs	Joe Gibbs Racing
- Time: 15.653

Most laps led
Driver	Justin Allgaier	JR Motorsports
- Laps: 148

Winner
No. 9	Noah Gragson	JR Motorsports

Television in the United States
- Network: USA Network
- Announcers: Rick Allen, Jeff Burton, and Steve Letarte

Radio in the United States
- Radio: Performance Racing Network

The 2022 Food City 300 was the 26th stock car race of the 2022 NASCAR Xfinity Series, the final race of the regular season, and the 41st iteration of the event. The race was held on Friday, September 16, 2022, in Bristol, Tennessee at Bristol Motor Speedway, a 0.533 miles (0.858 km) permanent oval-shaped racetrack. The race took the scheduled 300 laps to complete. Noah Gragson, driving for JR Motorsports, took advantage of the lead with 25 laps to go, and held off Brandon Jones for his eleventh career NASCAR Xfinity Series win, along with his sixth of the season, and his third win in a row. Gragson's teammate, Justin Allgaier, dominated most of the race, leading 148 laps and winning a stage. To fill out the podium, Austin Hill, driving for Richard Childress Racing, would finish 3rd, respectively.

12 drivers would qualify for the playoffs: Noah Gragson, Ty Gibbs, Justin Allgaier, A. J. Allmendinger, Josh Berry, Austin Hill, Brandon Jones, Jeremy Clements, Sam Mayer, Daniel Hemric, Riley Herbst, and Ryan Sieg. Allmendinger would also clinch the Regular Season Championship following the race.

This was the official debut race for CARS Pro Late Model Tour driver, Bobby McCarty. He was originally scheduled to make his debut at the New Hampshire race earlier in the year, but had failed to qualify.

== Background ==
Bristol Motor Speedway, formerly known as Bristol International Raceway and Bristol Raceway, is a NASCAR short track venue located in Bristol, Tennessee. Constructed in 1960, it held its first NASCAR race on July 30, 1961. Bristol is among the most popular tracks on the NASCAR schedule because of its distinct features, which include extraordinarily steep banking, an all-concrete surface, two pit roads, and stadium-like seating. It has also been named one of the loudest NASCAR tracks. The track is billed as the "World's Fastest Half-Mile", even though that designation technically belongs to the Volusia Speedway Park dirt track.

=== Entry list ===
- (R) denotes rookie driver.
- (i) denotes driver who are ineligible for series driver points.

#	Driver	Team	Make
1	Sam Mayer	JR Motorsports	Chevrolet
02	Sage Karam	Our Motorsports	Chevrolet
2	Sheldon Creed (R)	Richard Childress Racing	Chevrolet
4	Bayley Currey	JD Motorsports	Chevrolet
5	Brandon Brown	B. J. McLeod Motorsports	Chevrolet
6	Bobby McCarty	JD Motorsports	Chevrolet
07	Joe Graf Jr.	SS-Green Light Racing	Ford
7	Justin Allgaier	JR Motorsports	Chevrolet
08	David Starr	SS-Green Light Racing	Ford
8	Josh Berry	JR Motorsports	Chevrolet
9	Noah Gragson	JR Motorsports	Chevrolet
10	Landon Cassill	Kaulig Racing	Chevrolet
11	Daniel Hemric	Kaulig Racing	Chevrolet
13	Chad Finchum	MBM Motorsports	Ford
16	A. J. Allmendinger	Kaulig Racing	Chevrolet
18	Sammy Smith	Joe Gibbs Racing	Toyota
19	Brandon Jones	Joe Gibbs Racing	Toyota
21	Austin Hill (R)	Richard Childress Racing	Chevrolet
23	Anthony Alfredo	Our Motorsports	Chevrolet
26	Jeffrey Earnhardt	Sam Hunt Racing	Toyota
27	Jeb Burton	Our Motorsports	Chevrolet
31	Myatt Snider	Jordan Anderson Racing	Chevrolet
34	Kyle Weatherman	Jesse Iwuji Motorsports	Chevrolet
35	Patrick Emerling	Emerling-Gase Motorsports	Toyota
36	Alex Labbé	DGM Racing	Chevrolet
38	C. J. McLaughlin	RSS Racing	Ford
39	Ryan Sieg	RSS Racing	Ford
44	Ryan Ellis	Alpha Prime Racing	Chevrolet
45	Stefan Parsons	Alpha Prime Racing	Chevrolet
47	Dawson Cram	Mike Harmon Racing	Chevrolet
48	Nick Sanchez	Big Machine Racing	Chevrolet
51	Jeremy Clements	Jeremy Clements Racing	Chevrolet
52	Brennan Poole (i)	Jimmy Means Racing	Chevrolet
54	Ty Gibbs	Joe Gibbs Racing	Toyota
66	J. J. Yeley	MBM Motorsports	Ford
68	Kris Wright	Brandonbilt Motorsports	Chevrolet
77	Ronnie Bassett Jr.	Bassett Racing	Chevrolet
78	B. J. McLeod	B. J. McLeod Motorsports	Chevrolet
91	Mason Massey	DGM Racing	Chevrolet
92	Josh Williams	DGM Racing	Chevrolet
98	Riley Herbst	Stewart-Haas Racing	Ford
Official entry list

== Practice ==
For practice, drivers will be separated into two groups, Group A and B. Both sessions will be 15 minutes long, and was held on Friday, September 16, at 2:35 PM EST. Ty Gibbs, driving for Joe Gibbs Racing, was the fastest driver in total, with a lap of 16.045, and an average speed of 119.589 mph (192.460 km/h).

Pos.	#	Driver	Team	Make	Time	Speed
1	54	Ty Gibbs	Joe Gibbs Racing	Toyota	16.045	119.589
2	7	Justin Allgaier	JR Motorsports	Chevrolet	16.058	119.492
3	9	Noah Gragson	JR Motorsports	Chevrolet	16.102	119.165
Full practice results

== Qualifying ==
Qualifying was held on Friday, September 16, at 3:10 PM EST. Since Bristol Motor Speedway is a short track, the qualifying system used is a single-car, two-lap system with only one round. Whoever sets the fastest time in the round wins the pole. Ty Gibbs, driving for Joe Gibbs Racing, scored the pole for the race, with a lap of 15.653, and an average speed of 122.584 mph (197.280 km/h).

Pos.	#	Driver	Team	Make	Time	Speed
1	54	Ty Gibbs	Joe Gibbs Racing	Toyota	15.653	122.584
2	8	Josh Berry	JR Motorsports	Chevrolet	15.715	122.100
3	7	Justin Allgaier	JR Motorsports	Chevrolet	15.740	121.906
4	16	A. J. Allmendinger	Kaulig Racing	Chevrolet	15.747	121.852
5	1	Sam Mayer	JR Motorsports	Chevrolet	15.792	121.505
6	18	Sammy Smith	Joe Gibbs Racing	Toyota	15.813	121.343
7	27	Jeb Burton	Our Motorsports	Chevrolet	15.834	121.182
8	11	Daniel Hemric	Kaulig Racing	Chevrolet	15.841	121.129
9	9	Noah Gragson	JR Motorsports	Chevrolet	15.860	120.984
10	39	Ryan Sieg	RSS Racing	Ford	15.886	120.786
11	19	Brandon Jones	Joe Gibbs Racing	Toyota	15.901	120.672
12	98	Riley Herbst	Stewart-Haas Racing	Ford	15.941	120.369
13	5	Brandon Brown	B. J. McLeod Motorsports	Chevrolet	15.964	120.195
14	45	Stefan Parsons (i)	Alpha Prime Racing	Chevrolet	15.984	120.045
15	21	Austin Hill (R)	Richard Childress Racing	Chevrolet	16.019	119.783
16	10	Landon Cassill	Kaulig Racing	Chevrolet	16.028	119.715
17	91	Mason Massey	DGM Racing	Chevrolet	16.035	119.663
18	23	Anthony Alfredo	Our Motorsports	Chevrolet	16.037	119.648
19	51	Jeremy Clements	Jeremy Clements Racing	Chevrolet	16.037	119.648
20	4	Bayley Currey	JD Motorsports	Chevrolet	16.054	119.522
21	26	Jeffrey Earnhardt	Sam Hunt Racing	Toyota	16.080	119.328
22	2	Sheldon Creed (R)	Richard Childress Racing	Chevrolet	16.113	119.084
23	35	Patrick Emerling	Emerling-Gase Motorsports	Chevrolet	16.131	118.951
24	48	Nick Sanchez	Big Machine Racing	Chevrolet	16.135	118.922
25	36	Alex Labbé	DGM Racing	Chevrolet	16.136	118.914
26	66	J. J. Yeley	MBM Motorsports	Toyota	16.154	118.782
27	08	David Starr	SS-Green Light Racing	Ford	16.160	118.738
28	44	Ryan Ellis	Alpha Prime Racing	Chevrolet	16.177	118.613
29	78	B. J. McLeod	B. J. McLeod Motorsports	Chevrolet	16.178	118.606
30	92	Josh Williams	DGM Racing	Chevrolet	16.184	118.562
31	02	Sage Karam	Our Motorsports	Chevrolet	16.198	118.459
32	77	Ronnie Bassett Jr.	Bassett Racing	Chevrolet	16.198	118.459
33	34	Kyle Weatherman	Jesse Iwuji Motorsports	Chevrolet	16.218	118.313
Qualified by owner's points
34	68	Kris Wright	Brandonbilt Motorsports	Chevrolet	16.221	118.291
35	38	C. J. McLaughlin	RSS Racing	Ford	16.244	118.124
36	31	Myatt Snider	Jordan Anderson Racing	Chevrolet	16.336	117.458
37	07	Joe Graf Jr.	SS-Green Light Racing	Ford	16.392	117.057
38	6	Bobby McCarty	JD Motorsports	Chevrolet	16.415	116.893
Failed to qualify
39	52	Brennan Poole (i)	Jimmy Means Racing	Chevrolet	16.240	118.153
40	13	Chad Finchum	MBM Motorsports	Ford	16.352	117.343
41	47	Dawson Cram	Mike Harmon Racing	Chevrolet	16.987	112.957
Official qualifying results
Official starting lineup

== Race results ==
Stage 1 Laps: 85

Pos.	#	Driver	Team	Make	Pts
1	54	Ty Gibbs	Joe Gibbs Racing	Toyota	10
2	7	Justin Allgaier	JR Motorsports	Chevrolet	9
3	9	Noah Gragson	JR Motorsports	Chevrolet	8
4	1	Sam Mayer	JR Motorsports	Chevrolet	7
5	16	A. J. Allmendinger	Kaulig Racing	Chevrolet	6
6	8	Josh Berry	JR Motorsports	Chevrolet	5
7	27	Jeb Burton	Our Motorsports	Chevrolet	4
8	11	Daniel Hemric	Kaulig Racing	Chevrolet	3
9	10	Landon Cassill	Kaulig Racing	Chevrolet	2
10	39	Ryan Sieg	RSS Racing	Ford	1

Stage 2 Laps: 85

Pos.	#	Driver	Team	Make	Pts
1	7	Justin Allgaier	JR Motorsports	Chevrolet	10
2	9	Noah Gragson	JR Motorsports	Chevrolet	9
3	16	A. J. Allmendinger	Kaulig Racing	Chevrolet	8
4	19	Brandon Jones	Joe Gibbs Racing	Toyota	7
5	98	Riley Herbst	Stewart-Haas Racing	Ford	6
6	21	Austin Hill (R)	Richard Childress Racing	Chevrolet	5
7	27	Jeb Burton	Our Motorsports	Chevrolet	4
8	11	Daniel Hemric	Kaulig Racing	Chevrolet	3
9	1	Sam Mayer	JR Motorsports	Chevrolet	2
10	18	Sammy Smith	Joe Gibbs Racing	Toyota	1

Stage 3 Laps: 130

Fin.	St	#	Driver	Team	Make	Laps	Led	Status	Pts
1	9	9	Noah Gragson	JR Motorsports	Chevrolet	300	25	Running	57
2	11	19	Brandon Jones	Joe Gibbs Racing	Toyota	300	0	Running	42
3	15	21	Austin Hill (R)	Richard Childress Racing	Chevrolet	300	0	Running	39
4	5	1	Sam Mayer	JR Motorsports	Chevrolet	300	0	Running	42
5	12	98	Riley Herbst	Stewart-Haas Racing	Ford	300	0	Running	38
6	4	16	A. J. Allmendinger	Kaulig Racing	Chevrolet	300	0	Running	45
7	2	8	Josh Berry	JR Motorsports	Chevrolet	300	0	Running	35
8	14	45	Stefan Parsons (i)	Alpha Prime Racing	Chevrolet	300	0	Running	0
9	3	7	Justin Allgaier	JR Motorsports	Chevrolet	300	148	Running	47
10	10	39	Ryan Sieg	RSS Racing	Ford	300	0	Running	28
11	20	4	Bayley Currey	JD Motorsports	Chevrolet	300	4	Running	26
12	21	26	Jeffrey Earnhardt	Sam Hunt Racing	Toyota	300	0	Running	25
13	18	23	Anthony Alfredo	Our Motorsports	Chevrolet	300	0	Running	24
14	6	18	Sammy Smith	Joe Gibbs Racing	Toyota	299	0	Running	24
15	7	27	Jeb Burton	Our Motorsports	Chevrolet	299	0	Running	30
16	19	51	Jeremy Clements	Jeremy Clements Racing	Chevrolet	299	0	Running	21
17	33	34	Kyle Weatherman	Jesse Iwuji Motorsports	Chevrolet	299	0	Running	20
18	31	02	Sage Karam	Our Motorsports	Chevrolet	299	0	Running	19
19	28	44	Ryan Ellis	Alpha Prime Racing	Chevrolet	299	0	Running	18
20	8	11	Daniel Hemric	Kaulig Racing	Chevrolet	298	0	Running	23
21	30	92	Josh Williams	DGM Racing	Chevrolet	298	0	Running	16
22	36	31	Myatt Snider	Jordan Anderson Racing	Chevrolet	298	0	Running	15
23	37	07	Joe Graf Jr.	SS-Green Light Racing	Ford	298	0	Running	14
24	35	38	C. J. McLaughlin	RSS Racing	Ford	297	0	Running	13
25	34	68	Kris Wright	Brandonbilt Motorsports	Chevrolet	297	0	Running	12
26	25	36	Alex Labbé	DGM Racing	Chevrolet	297	0	Running	11
27	23	35	Patrick Emerling	Emerling-Gase Motorsports	Chevrolet	294	0	Running	10
28	32	77	Ronnie Bassett Jr.	Bassett Racing	Chevrolet	294	0	Running	9
29	24	48	Nick Sanchez	Big Machine Racing	Chevrolet	294	0	Running	8
30	27	08	David Starr	SS-Green Light Racing	Ford	293	0	Running	7
31	38	6	Bobby McCarty	JD Motorsports	Chevrolet	288	0	Running	6
32	17	91	Mason Massey	DGM Racing	Chevrolet	271	0	Oil Line	5
33	26	66	J. J. Yeley	MBM Motorsports	Toyota	267	0	Accident	4
34	29	78	B. J. McLeod	B. J. McLeod Motorsports	Chevrolet	220	0	Brakes	3
35	16	10	Landon Cassill	Kaulig Racing	Chevrolet	188	0	Running	4
36	1	54	Ty Gibbs	Joe Gibbs Racing	Toyota	129	89	Accident	11
37	22	2	Sheldon Creed (R)	Richard Childress Racing	Chevrolet	128	34	Accident	1
38	13	5	Brandon Brown	B. J. McLeod Motorsports	Chevrolet	45	0	Accident	1
Official race results

== Standings after the race ==
Drivers' Championship standings

	Pos	Driver	Points
3	1	Noah Gragson	2,051
	2	Ty Gibbs	2,038 (-13)
	3	Justin Allgaier	2,033 (-18)
3	4	A. J. Allmendinger	2,032 (-19)
	5	Josh Berry	2,022 (-29)
	6	Austin Hill	2,016 (-35)
	7	Brandon Jones	2,010 (-41)
8	8	Jeremy Clements	2,005 (-46)
1	9	Sam Mayer	2,005 (-46)
	10	Daniel Hemric	2,003 (-48)
2	11	Riley Herbst	2,002 (-49)
	12	Ryan Sieg	2,001 (-50)
Official driver's standings

- Note: Only the first 12 positions are included for the driver standings.

Previous race: 2022 Kansas Lottery 300	NASCAR Xfinity Series; 2022 season	Next race: 2022 Andy's Frozen Custard 300
