= 2018 CARS Tour =

22nd season of the CARS Tour

The 2018 CARS Tour was the 22nd season of the CARS Response Energy Tour, a stock car racing series. It began at Tri-County Motor Speedway on March 10 and ended at South Boston Speedway on November 3. Bobby McCarty won the Late Model Stock Tour championship, while Jared Fryar won the Super Late Model Tour championship.

Josh Berry entered the season as the defending Late Model Stock Tour champion, while Cole Rouse entered as the defending Super Late Model Tour champion. Rouse did not return to the series in 2018, as he ran full-time in the NASCAR K&N Pro Series West that year.

== Schedule & results ==
Date	Track	Location	LMSC Winner	SLM Winner
March 10	Tri-County Motor Speedway	Hudson, North Carolina	Bobby McCarty	N/A
March 24	Myrtle Beach Speedway	Myrtle Beach, South Carolina	Lee Pulliam	Jeff Fultz
April 7	Nashville Fairgrounds Speedway	Nashville, Tennessee	N/A	Casey Roderick
April 21	Orange County Speedway	Rougemont, North Carolina	Deac McCaskill	Bubba Pollard
May 5	Hickory Motor Speedway	Hickory, North Carolina	Bobby McCarty	Chris Dilbeck
May 19-20	Bristol Motor Speedway	Bristol, Tennessee	Lee Pulliam (5/19)	Raphaël Lessard (5/20)
June 9	Ace Speedway	Altamahaw, North Carolina	Bobby McCarty	N/A
June 9	Anderson Motor Speedway	Anderson, South Carolina	N/A	Bubba Pollard
June 23	Carteret County Speedway	Swansboro, North Carolina	Bobby McCarty	N/A
July 14	Kingsport Speedway	Kingsport, Tennessee	Layne Riggs	N/A
August 3-4	Hickory Motor Speedway	Hickory, North Carolina	Josh Berry (8/3)	Brandon Setzer (8/4)
August 25	Wake County Speedway	Raleigh, North Carolina	Sam Mayer	N/A
September 8	Orange County Speedway	Rougemont, North Carolina	Josh Berry	Kyle Plott
November 3	South Boston Speedway	South Boston, Virginia	Craig Moore	Corey Heim

== Standings ==
=== Late Model Stock Car championship ===
(key) Bold – Pole position awarded by time. Italics – Pole position set by final practice results or rainout. * – Most laps led.

Pos	Driver	TCM	MYB	ROU	HCY	BRI	ACE	CCS	KPT	HCY	WKS	ROU	SBO	Points
1	Bobby McCarty	1*	5	3	1	7	**1****	1	7	4	7*	5	9	361
2	Lee Pulliam	21	1	4	4	**1***	4	6	3	2	2	8	3	344
3	Deac McCaskill	6	14	1*	5	8	17	11	5	6	**4**	2*	2	322
4	Josh Berry	**5**	4		2	5	14	9	9	**1***	5	1	4	312
5	Sam Mayer	3	15	7	7	9	20	14	4	7	1	6	8	297
6	Layne Riggs	14	11		9	2	3	**2***	**1***	5	3	14	**28***	281
7	Ronald Hill	15	2	10	6	14	9	8	13	19	9	12	18	262
8	Ty Gibbs	19	**22***	5	**11***	4	7	5	12	27	11	16	6	258
9	Brandon Pierce	20	10	**2**	17		18	3	10	18	8	7	5	247
10	Charlie Watson	DNQ	27	6	14	15	11	16	18	8	12	9	13	216
11	Cody Haskins	9	9	9	25	10	2	13	15	9	17			212
12	Bradley McCaskill	23	6	17	19	20	10	7	22	10	6	13		211
13	Craig Moore	13	13	22	22		19	12	23	17		**3**	1*	190
14	Trevor Ward	18	26	18	13	13	5	15	11	DNS			7	173
15	Tommy Lemons Jr.	12			3		13	4	8	24		4		163
16	Grayson Cullather	26	23	12	12	21	21			13			12	124
17	Chris Denny	27		8	23		12			23		10	25	103
18	Justin Johnson	22	3	11								15		82
19	Justin Carroll	2	21		8					26				75
20	Timothy Peters	8								3			17	73
21	Ryan Repko	4	16		24		23							65
22	Austin McDaniel	10			16					16				58
23	Cole Glasson				10					11			22	56
24	Blake Stallings	7					6							53
25	Justin Crider		18			6	22							50
26	Thomas Beane	24							20	25	13			50
27	Mike Chambers					19					19	17		44
28	Craig Stallard		25	13						20				41
29	Jacob Heafner	DNQ	19		18								23	41
30	Eric Winslow										10		16	40
31	Ryan Millington				20		8							38
32	Mason Diaz									14			15	37
33	Dylon Wilson									12	18			36
34	Dexter Canipe Jr.	25	24		15									35
35	Nik Williams	DNQ				18			16					34
36	Austin Thaxton			19									14	33
37	Kres VanDyke								2					32
38	Myatt Snider					3*								32
39	Danny O'Quinn Jr.					16			21					29
40	Carson Kvapil	17		21										28
41	Derrick Lancaster								6					27
42	Matt Cox		7											26
43	Sam Yarbrough		8											25
44	Camden Gullie											11	DNS	24
45	Colby Howard	DNQ	12											23
46	Sarah Cornett-Ching							10						23
47	Tyler Hughes												10	23
48	Justin Hicks					11								22
49	Landon Huffman	16								28				22
50	Matt Bowling	11												22
51	Stacy Puryear												11	22
52	Terry Brooks Jr.					12								21
53	Alex Fleming										14			19
54	R. D. Smith III			DNS			16							19
55	Trey Bayne								14					19
56	Tyler Matthews			14										19
57	Bruce Anderson			15										18
58	Jeb Burton						15							18
59	Joe Graf Jr.	DNQ	17											18
60	Kevin Leicht									15				18
61	Sam Pacitti										15			18
62	Scott Riggs			16										17
63	Zachary Marks										16			17
64	Hayden Woods								17					16
65	Joey Trent					17								16
66	Mini Tyrrell												19	14
67	Wayne Hale								19					14
68	Bryant Barnhill		20											13
69	Jessica Dana												20	13
70	Randy Renfrow										20			13
71	Terry Dease			20										13
72	Colin Garrett												21	12
73	Riley Herbst									21				12
74	Will Burns				21									12
75	Mitch Walker									22				11
76	Paul Nogradi Jr.					22								11
77	Austin Peters					23								10
78	Brandon Rogers					24								9
79	Logan Jones												24	9
80	Mason Hudson												26	7
81	Rodney Boyd												27	6
82	Chad McCumbee	28												5
83	Andrew Garcia	DNQ												2
84	Chris Hudspeth	DNQ												2
85	J. R. Courage									DNS				2
86	Sheflon Gray	DNQ												2
87	Zachary Bruenger									DNS				2
Pos	Driver	TCM	MYB	ROU	HCY	BRI	ACE	CCS	KPT	HCY	WKS	ROU	SBO	Points

=== Super Late Model Tour championship ===
(key) Bold – Pole position awarded by time. Italics – Pole position set by final practice results or rainout. * – Most laps led.

Pos	Driver	MYB	NSH	ROU	HCY	BRI	AND	HCY	ROU	SBO	Points
1	Jared Fryar	8	9	3	3	**7**	14	5	4	12	232
2	Corey Heim	7	11	24	8	3	12	8	2	1	224
3	Anthony Cataldi	5	13	21	4	8	10	24	7	2	204
4	Raphaël Lessard	**6**	19	4	12	1*	4	15	**5**		203
5	Molly Helmuth	15	21	12	14		8	12	8	9	165
6	Jeff Batten	4		18	6		15	20	12	6	150
7	Matt Craig	10		8	15		5	6	13		141
8	Tate Fogleman	14		25	5			9	11	**4***	133
9	Darrell Gilchrist		18	19	17		27	13	9	11	119
10	Steve Wallace		31	6		18	13		3*		94
11	Chandler Smith	2			2			2			93
12	Bubba Pollard		33	1			**1***	19*			87
13	Preston Peltier	17		26			6	**4**			82
14	Mike Speeney			17				14	6	14	81
15	Brandon Setzer			**15***	**11**			1			80
16	Tyler Church				7			10		8	74
17	Taylor Stricklin	16			9			27		10	70
18	Tyler Ankrum		30	5		5		25			64
19	Gracie Trotter			10				16	10		63
20	Jody Measamer	11		22				11			55
21	Nolan Pope							7		5	54
22	Ryan Moore	3		9							54
23	Stephen Nasse		7	2		12					53
24	Kodie Conner	12						3			51
25	Dean Ward			23					15	15	46
26	Tim Hollis			11			11				44
27	Chris Dilbrick				1*			26			42
28	Matt Wallace		17				7	17		7	42
29	Jeff Fultz	1*									35
30	Wayne Jefferson				10			21			35
31	Kyle Plott						3		1		34
32	Greg Burgess			20			17				31
33	Brandon Lynn									3	30
34	Dan Speeney			27					14		27
35	Corey LaJoie		6	7							26
36	Jake Crum				16	25					25
37	Gus Dean	9									24
38	Chris Fontaine	13									21
39	Blaise Rutherford				13						20
40	Lucas Jones			13							20
41	Mike Wallace									13	20
42	Harold Crooms						26	DNQ	16		19
43	Roy Hayes			16				DNQ			19
44	Ryan Mathews							DNQ		16	19
45	Wyatt Alexander			14							19
46	Colin Garrett									17	16
47	Austin Theriault							18			15
48	Bradley Riethmeyer				18						15
49	Mason Diaz							22			11
50	Matt Thomas							23			10
51	Amber Balcaen							28			5
52	Jerick Johnson							DNQ			2
53	Joe Graf Jr.							DNQ			2
54	Allen Karnes		22			21					
55	Anthony Sergi						22				
56	Austin Kunert		23			13					
57	Billy VanMeter					20					
58	Boris Jurkovic		35								
59	Carson Hocevar		10								
60	Casey Roderick		1				2				
61	Chad McCumbee						16				
62	Cole Anderson						DNS				
63	Cole Williams		27								
64	Colin Allman						23				
65	Connor Okrzesik		15			6	21				
66	Dan Fredrickson		16								
67	David Green		28								
68	Donnie Wilson		34								
69	Greg Van Alst					22					
70	Hudson Halder						24				
71	Hunter Jack		14			16					
72	Jack Dossey III					24					
73	Jeff Gordon					19					
74	Jerry Fortner					26					
75	Jett Noland						25				
76	John Coffman					14					
77	Johnny VanDoorn		**3**								
78	Jon Beach		20			9					
79	Josh Brock		5*			10					
80	Justin Ashburn		26								
81	Lance Moss						19				
82	Lee Tissot						20				
83	Logan Bearden		12								
84	Logan Boyett						DNS				
85	Logan Runyon		29			17					
86	Mason Mingus		32			4					
87	Nick Grodi					11					
88	Noah Gragson		4								
89	Paul Shafer Jr.		8								
90	Preston Bores		25								
91	Scotty Ellis						9				
92	Shane Chastain						18				
93	Steve Renner					23					
94	Stewart Friesen		2			2					
95	Trevor Noles					15					
96	Tristan Van Wieringen		36								
97	Willie Allen		24								
Pos	Driver	MYB	NSH	ROU	HCY	BRI	AND	HCY	ROU	SBO	Points

== See also ==
- 2018 Monster Energy NASCAR Cup Series
- 2018 NASCAR Xfinity Series
- 2018 NASCAR Camping World Truck Series
- 2018 NASCAR K&N Pro Series East
- 2018 NASCAR K&N Pro Series West
- 2018 NASCAR Whelen Modified Tour
- 2018 NASCAR Pinty's Series
- 2018 NASCAR PEAK Mexico Series
- 2018 NASCAR Whelen Euro Series
