= Brandon Setzer =

American racing driver

- Born: October 26, 1993 (age 33) Newton, North Carolina, U.S.

CARS Pro Late Model Tour career
- Debut season: 2022
- Years active: 2022–2023
- Starts: 3
- Championships: 0
- Wins: 0
- Poles: 0
- Best finish: 17th in 2022
- Statistics up to date as of April 29, 2026.

Brandon Setzer (born October 26, 1993) is an American professional stock car racing driver and team owner who competed in the CARS Tour from 2015 to 2023. He is the son of former NASCAR driver Dennis Setzer. He is also the owner of Setzer Racing and Development, which competes in late model competition.

In the CARS Tour, Setzer primarily competed in the Super Late Model Tour from 2015 to 2021, where he won six races (two in 2015, one in 2016, two in 2017, and one in 2018), and finished second in the points in 2016 and 2017.

During a CARS race at Hickory Motor Speedway in May 2018, Setzer was involved in an altercation with Raphaël Lessard late in race, where he was spun by Lessard on the final lap, which led officials to black flag Lessard and send him to the back for the final restart. After the race, Setzer wan involved in a fight with crew members from Lessard's team, Kyle Busch Motorsports. He and father Dennis were later given a five race suspension, which would later be reduced following an appeal.

Setzer has also competed in series such as the PASS South Super Late Model Series, the Southeast Limited Late Model Series, the PRA Super Late Model Series, and the Paramount Kia Big 10 Challenge.

== Motorsports results ==
=== CARS Super Late Model Tour ===
(key)

CARS Super Late Model Tour results
Year	Team	No.	Make	1	2	3	4	5	6	7	8	9	10	11	12	13	CSLMTC	Pts	Ref
2015	Dennis Setzer	6	Ford	SNM; 27	ROU; 6	HCY; 11	SNM; 14	TCM; 20	MMS; 27	ROU; 1*	CON	MYB; 1	HCY; 20				8th	184	
2016	Dennis Setzer	6	Ford	SNM; 11	ROU; 4	HCY; 3	TCM; 2*	GRE; 6	ROU; 7	CON; 9	MYB; 18	HCY; 1*	SNM; 2				2nd	275	
2017	Dennis Setzer	6	Ford	CON; 7	DOM; 1*	DOM; 1**	HCY; 5*	HCY; 4	BRI	AND; 14	ROU; 15	TCM; 2	ROU; 17		CON; 8	SBO; 12	2nd	321	
2017	Dennis Setzer	4	Ford											HCY; 3			2nd	321	
2018	Dennis Setzer	6	Ford	MYB	NSH	ROU; 15*	HCY; 11	BRI	AND								15th	80	
2018	Dennis Setzer	6S	Ford							HCY; 1	ROU	SBO					15th	80	
2019	Dennis Setzer	6	Ford	SNM; 3	HCY; 2	NSH	MMS; 10	BRI		ROU; 18	SBO						10th	131	
2019	Dennis Setzer	4S	Ford						HCY; 2								10th	131	
2021	Brandon Setzer	6	Ford	HCY; 14	GPS	NSH	JEN	HCY; 6	MMS	TCM	SBO						17th	46	

=== CARS Pro Late Model Tour ===
(key)

CARS Pro Late Model Tour results
Year	Team	No.	Make	1	2	3	4	5	6	7	8	9	10	11	12	13	CPLMTC	Pts	Ref
2022	Brandon Setzer	6	Ford	CRW	HCY	GPS; 3	FCS	TCM	HCY	ACE	MMS	TCM	ACE	SBO	CRW; 3		17th	60	
2023	Brandon Setzer	6	Chevy	SNM	HCY	ACE	NWS	TCM	DIL	CRW	WKS	HCY	TCM	SBO	TCM; 3	CRW	45th	29	
