= Fairlawn, Pulaski County, Virginia =

Fairlawn
- CDP
- Location within Shenandoah Valley Location within Virginia Location within the United States
- Coordinates: 37°9′2″N 80°34′14″W
- Country: United States
- State: Virginia
- County: Pulaski

Area
  - Total: 3.5 sq mi (9.1 km^{2})
  - Land: 3.2 sq mi (8.3 km^{2})
  - Water: 0.31 sq mi (0.8 km^{2})

Population (2020)
  - Total: 2,419
  - Density: 750/sq mi (290/km^{2})
- Time zone: UTC−5 (Eastern (EST))
  - Summer (DST): UTC−4 (EDT)

Fairlawn is a census-designated place (CDP) in Pulaski County, Virginia, United States. The population was 2,419 at the 2020 census up from 2,367 at the 2010 census. It is served by the Radford, Virginia post office and is located on the opposite side of the New River from Radford.

Fairlawn is part of the Blacksburg–Christiansburg Metropolitan Statistical Area.

Fairlawn is home to IHRA sanctioned Pulaski County Motorsports Park, formerly known as Motor Mile Speedway.

== Geography ==
Fairlawn is located at 37°9′2″N 80°34′14″W (37.150512, −80.570515).

According to the United States Census Bureau, the CDP has a total area of 3.5 square miles (9.1 km^{2}), of which 3.2 square miles (8.3 km^{2}) is land and 0.3 square mile (0.8 km^{2}) (8.78%) is water.

== Demographics ==
As of the census of 2000, there were 2,211 people, 995 households, and 631 families residing in the CDP. The population density was 688.4 people per square mile (265.9/km^{2}). There were 1,065 housing units at an average density of 331.6/sq mi (128.1/km^{2}). The racial makeup of the CDP was 92.72% White, 5.52% African American, 0.14% Native American, 0.23% Asian, 0.27% from other races, and 1.13% from two or more races. Hispanic or Latino of any race were 0.86% of the population.

There were 995 households, out of which 23.7% had children under the age of 18 living with them, 50.3% were married couples living together, 10.3% had a female householder with no husband present, and 36.5% were non-families. 31.7% of all households were made up of individuals, and 12.1% had someone living alone who was 65 years of age or older. The average household size was 2.16 and the average family size was 2.68.

In the CDP, the population was spread out, with 18.5% under the age of 18, 7.9% from 18 to 24, 28.6% from 25 to 44, 25.0% from 45 to 64, and 19.9% who were 65 years of age or older. The median age was 41 years. For every 100 females there were 89.1 males. For every 100 females age 18 and over, there were 84.2 males.

The median income for a household in the CDP was $32,018, and the median income for a family was $45,270. Males had a median income of $30,455 versus $25,556 for females. The per capita income for the CDP was $17,606. About 11.4% of families and 8.2% of the population were below the poverty line, including 13.9% of those under the age of 18 and 1.0% ages 65 or older.
