= 2019 Alsco 300 (Charlotte) =

Race details
- Race 11 of 33 in the 2019 NASCAR Xfinity Series season
- Date: May 25, 2019
- Location: Charlotte Motor Speedway in Concord, North Carolina
- Course: Permanent racing facility
- Course length: 1.5 miles (2.4 km)
- Distance: 200 laps, 300 mi (480 km)

Pole position
Driver	Christopher Bell	Joe Gibbs Racing
- Time: 29.298

Most laps led
Driver	Tyler Reddick	Richard Childress Racing
- Laps: 110

Winner
No. 2	Tyler Reddick	Richard Childress Racing

Television in the United States
- Network: FS1

Radio in the United States
- Radio: MRN

The 2019 Alsco 300 was a NASCAR Xfinity Series race held on May 25, 2019, at Charlotte Motor Speedway in Concord, North Carolina. Contested over 200 laps on the 1.5-mile (2.4 km) asphalt speedway, it was the 11th race of the 2019 NASCAR Xfinity Series season.

== Background ==
=== Track ===
Charlotte Motor Speedway, the track where the race was held.

The race was held at Charlotte Motor Speedway, which is located in Concord, North Carolina. The speedway complex includes a 1.5-mile (2.4 km) quad-oval track, as well as a dragstrip and a dirt track. The speedway was built in 1959 by Bruton Smith and is considered the home track for NASCAR, as many race teams are based in the Charlotte metropolitan area. The track is owned and operated by Speedway Motorsports Inc. (SMI), with Marcus G. Smith serving as track president.

== Entry list ==
No.	Driver	Team	Manufacturer
00	Cole Custer	Stewart-Haas Racing with Biagi-DenBeste Racing	Ford
0	Garrett Smithley	JD Motorsports	Chevrolet
01	Stephen Leicht	JD Motorsports	Chevrolet
1	Michael Annett	JR Motorsports	Chevrolet
2	Tyler Reddick	Richard Childress Racing	Chevrolet
4	Ross Chastain	JD Motorsports	Chevrolet
5	Matt Mills (R)	B. J. McLeod Motorsports	Chevrolet
07	Ray Black Jr.	SS-Green Light Racing	Chevrolet
7	Justin Allgaier	JR Motorsports	Chevrolet
08	Gray Gaulding	SS-Green Light Racing	Chevrolet
8	Jeb Burton	JR Motorsports	Chevrolet
9	Noah Gragson (R)	JR Motorsports	Chevrolet
10	Austin Dillon (i)	Kaulig Racing	Chevrolet
11	Justin Haley (R)	Kaulig Racing	Chevrolet
13	Joe Nemechek (i)	MBM Motorsports	Toyota
15	B. J. McLeod	JD Motorsports	Chevrolet
17	Bayley Currey (i)	Rick Ware Racing	Chevrolet
18	Jeffrey Earnhardt	Joe Gibbs Racing	Toyota
19	Brandon Jones	Joe Gibbs Racing	Toyota
20	Christopher Bell	Joe Gibbs Racing	Toyota
22	Austin Cindric	Team Penske	Ford
23	John Hunter Nemechek (R)	GMS Racing	Chevrolet
35	Joey Gase	MBM Motorsports	Toyota
36	Josh Williams	DGM Racing	Chevrolet
38	Jeff Green	RSS Racing	Chevrolet
39	Ryan Sieg	RSS Racing	Chevrolet
42	Chad Finchum	MBM Motorsports	Toyota
51	Jeremy Clements	Jeremy Clements Racing	Chevrolet
52	David Starr	Jimmy Means Racing	Chevrolet
66	Timmy Hill	MBM Motorsports	Toyota
68	Brandon Brown	Brandonbilt Motorsports	Chevrolet
74	Camden Murphy (i)	Mike Harmon Racing	Chevrolet
78	Vinnie Miller	B. J. McLeod Motorsports	Chevrolet
86	Mason Diaz (R)	Brandonbilt Motorsports	Chevrolet
89	Landon Cassill	Shepherd Racing Ventures	Chevrolet
90	Dillon Bassett	DGM Racing	Chevrolet
92	Ronnie Bassett Jr.	DGM Racing	Chevrolet
93	Josh Bilicki	RSS Racing	Chevrolet
98	Chase Briscoe (R)	Stewart-Haas Racing with Biagi-DenBeste Racing	Ford
99	Jairo Avila Jr.	B. J. McLeod Motorsports	Chevrolet

== Practice ==
=== First practice ===
Tyler Reddick was the fastest in the first practice session with a time of 30.000 seconds and a speed of 180.000 mph (289.682 km/h).

Pos	No.	Driver	Team	Manufacturer	Time	Speed
1	2	Tyler Reddick	Richard Childress Racing	Chevrolet	30.000	180.000
2	00	Cole Custer	Stewart-Haas Racing with Biagi-DenBeste Racing	Ford	30.082	179.509
3	22	Austin Cindric	Team Penske	Ford	30.152	179.093

=== Final practice ===
Tyler Reddick was the fastest in the final practice session with a time of 29.911 seconds and a speed of 180.536 mph (290.545 km/h).

Pos	No.	Driver	Team	Manufacturer	Time	Speed
1	2	Tyler Reddick	Richard Childress Racing	Chevrolet	29.911	180.536
2	20	Christopher Bell	Joe Gibbs Racing	Toyota	30.009	179.946
3	11	Justin Haley (R)	Kaulig Racing	Chevrolet	30.086	179.485

== Qualifying ==
Christopher Bell scored the pole for the race with a time of 29.298 seconds and a speed of 184.313 mph (296.623 km/h).

=== Qualifying results ===
Pos	No	Driver	Team	Manufacturer	Time
1	20	Christopher Bell	Joe Gibbs Racing	Toyota	29.298
2	00	Cole Custer	Stewart-Haas Racing with Biagi-DenBeste Racing	Ford	29.478
3	2	Tyler Reddick	Richard Childress Racing	Chevrolet	29.639
4	10	Austin Dillon (i)	Kaulig Racing	Chevrolet	29.726
5	19	Brandon Jones	Joe Gibbs Racing	Toyota	29.734
6	7	Justin Allgaier	JR Motorsports	Chevrolet	29.784
7	22	Austin Cindric	Team Penske	Ford	29.789
8	1	Michael Annett	JR Motorsports	Chevrolet	29.814
9	18	Jeffrey Earnhardt	Joe Gibbs Racing	Toyota	29.863
10	9	Noah Gragson (R)	JR Motorsports	Chevrolet	29.868
11	98	Chase Briscoe (R)	Stewart-Haas Racing with Biagi-DenBeste Racing	Ford	29.917
12	39	Ryan Sieg	RSS Racing	Chevrolet	29.925
13	89	Landon Cassill	Shepherd Racing Ventures	Chevrolet	30.003
14	23	John Hunter Nemechek (R)	GMS Racing	Chevrolet	30.132
15	17	Bayley Currey (i)	Rick Ware Racing	Chevrolet	30.191
16	8	Jeb Burton	JR Motorsports	Chevrolet	30.195
17	51	Jeremy Clements	Jeremy Clements Racing	Chevrolet	30.219
18	66	Timmy Hill	MBM Motorsports	Toyota	30.380
19	08	Gray Gaulding	SS-Green Light Racing	Chevrolet	30.444
20	74	Camden Murphy (i)	Mike Harmon Racing	Chevrolet	30.529
21	15	B. J. McLeod	JD Motorsports	Chevrolet	30.667
22	36	Josh Williams	DGM Racing	Chevrolet	30.687
23	93	Josh Bilicki	RSS Racing	Chevrolet	30.700
24	92	Ronnie Bassett Jr.	DGM Racing	Chevrolet	30.711
25	68	Brandon Brown	Brandonbilt Motorsports	Chevrolet	30.828
26	35	Joey Gase	MBM Motorsports	Toyota	30.879
27	38	Jeff Green	RSS Racing	Chevrolet	30.980
28	07	Ray Black Jr.	SS-Green Light Racing	Chevrolet	31.065
29	52	David Starr	Jimmy Means Racing	Chevrolet	31.072
30	0	Garrett Smithley	JD Motorsports	Chevrolet	31.119
31	13	Joe Nemechek (i)	MBM Motorsports	Toyota	31.140
32	01	Stephen Leicht	JD Motorsports	Chevrolet	31.144
33	5	Matt Mills (R)	B. J. McLeod Motorsports	Chevrolet	31.152
34	78	Vinnie Miller	B. J. McLeod Motorsports	Chevrolet	31.162
35	11	Justin Haley (R)	Kaulig Racing	Chevrolet	31.629
36	86	Mason Diaz (R)	Brandonbilt Motorsports	Chevrolet	31.731
37	4	Ross Chastain	JD Motorsports	Chevrolet	0.000
38	42	Chad Finchum	MBM Motorsports	Toyota	0.000
Did not qualify
39	99	Jairo Avila Jr.	B. J. McLeod Motorsports	Chevrolet	31.542
40	90	Dillon Bassett	DGM Racing	Chevrolet	0.000

== Race ==
=== Stage Results ===
Stage One Laps: 45

Pos	No	Driver	Team	Manufacturer	Points
1	20	Christopher Bell	Joe Gibbs Racing	Toyota	10
2	00	Cole Custer	Stewart-Haas Racing with Biagi-DenBeste	Ford	9
3	2	Tyler Reddick	Richard Childress Racing	Chevrolet	8
4	98	Chase Briscoe (R)	Stewart-Haas Racing with Biagi-DenBeste	Ford	7
5	19	Brandon Jones	Joe Gibbs Racing	Toyota	6
6	7	Justin Allgaier	JR Motorsports	Chevrolet	5
7	9	Noah Gragson (R)	JR Motorsports	Chevrolet	4
8	1	Michael Annett	JR Motorsports	Chevrolet	3
9	39	Ryan Sieg	RSS Racing	Chevrolet	2
10	23	John Hunter Nemechek (R)	GMS Racing	Chevrolet	1

Stage Two Laps: 45

Pos	No	Driver	Team	Manufacturer	Points
1	2	Tyler Reddick	Richard Childress Racing	Chevrolet	10
2	98	Chase Briscoe (R)	Stewart-Haas Racing with Biagi-DenBeste	Ford	9
3	9	Noah Gragson (R)	JR Motorsports	Chevrolet	8
4	23	John Hunter Nemechek (R)	GMS Racing	Chevrolet	7
5	7	Justin Allgaier	JR Motorsports	Chevrolet	6
6	22	Austin Cindric	Team Penske	Ford	5
7	00	Cole Custer	Stewart-Haas Racing with Biagi-DenBeste	Ford	4
8	1	Michael Annett	JR Motorsports	Chevrolet	3
9	10	Austin Dillon (i)	Kaulig Racing	Chevrolet	0
10	18	Jeffrey Earnhardt	Joe Gibbs Racing	Toyota	1

=== Final Stage Results ===
Stage Three Laps: 110

Pos	Grid	No	Driver	Team	Manufacturer	Laps	Points
1	3	2	Tyler Reddick	Richard Childress Racing	Chevrolet	200	58
2	6	7	Justin Allgaier	JR Motorsports	Chevrolet	200	46
3	9	18	Jeffrey Earnhardt	Joe Gibbs Racing	Toyota	200	35
4	10	9	Noah Gragson (R)	JR Motorsports	Chevrolet	200	45
5	35	11	Justin Haley (R)	Kaulig Racing	Chevrolet	200	32
6	8	1	Michael Annett	JR Motorsports	Chevrolet	200	37
7	16	8	Jeb Burton	JR Motorsports	Chevrolet	200	30
8	12	39	Ryan Sieg	RSS Racing	Chevrolet	200	31
9	7	22	Austin Cindric	Team Penske	Ford	200	33
10	5	19	Brandon Jones	Joe Gibbs Racing	Toyota	200	33
11	37	4	Ross Chastain	JD Motorsports	Chevrolet	200	26
12	14	23	John Hunter Nemechek (R)	GMS Racing	Chevrolet	200	33
13	17	51	Jeremy Clements	Jeremy Clements Racing	Chevrolet	200	24
14	19	08	Gray Gaulding	SS-Green Light Racing	Chevrolet	200	23
15	32	01	Stephen Leicht	JD Motorsports	Chevrolet	200	22
16	28	07	Ray Black Jr.	SS-Green Light Racing	Chevrolet	200	21
17	30	0	Garrett Smithley	JD Motorsports	Chevrolet	200	20
18	21	15	B. J. McLeod	JD Motorsports	Chevrolet	199	19
19	11	98	Chase Briscoe (R)	Stewart-Haas Racing with Biagi-DenBeste	Ford	199	34
20	25	68	Brandon Brown	Brandonbilt Motorsports	Chevrolet	198	17
21	26	35	Joey Gase	MBM Motorsports	Toyota	198	16
22	29	52	David Starr	Jimmy Means Racing	Chevrolet	198	15
23	34	78	Vinnie Miller	B. J. McLeod Motorsports	Chevrolet	197	14
24	2	00	Cole Custer	Stewart-Haas Racing with Biagi-DenBeste	Ford	196	26
25	24	92	Ronnie Bassett Jr.	DGM Racing	Chevrolet	195	12
26	33	5	Matt Mills (R)	B. J. McLeod Motorsports	Chevrolet	194	11
27	22	36	Josh Williams	DGM Racing	Chevrolet	187	10
28	4	10	Daniel Hemric (i)	Kaulig Racing	Chevrolet	186	0
29	20	74	Camden Murphy (i)	Mike Harmon Racing	Chevrolet	173	0
30	36	86	Mason Diaz (R)	Brandonbilt Motorsports	Chevrolet	100	7
31	1	20	Christopher Bell	Joe Gibbs Racing	Toyota	90	16
32	31	13	Joe Nemechek (i)	MBM Motorsports	Toyota	58	0
33	15	17	Bayley Currey (i)	Rick Ware Racing	Chevrolet	35	0
34	13	89	Landon Cassill	Shepherd Racing Ventures	Chevrolet	31	3
35	18	66	Timmy Hill	MBM Motorsports	Toyota	17	2
36	23	93	Josh Bilicki	RSS Racing	Chevrolet	10	1
37	27	38	Jeff Green	RSS Racing	Chevrolet	6	1
38	38	42	Chad Finchum	MBM Motorsports	Toyota	5	1

- Due to extreme heat, Austin Dillon was unable to complete the race and was replaced by Daniel Hemric during a caution period. Because Dillon started the race, he is officially credited with the 28th-place finish, while Hemric is not credited with a finishing position.

Previous race: 2019 Allied Steel Buildings 200	NASCAR Xfinity Series; 2019 season	Next race: 2019 Pocono Green 250
