= Pulaski County Motorsports Park =

Racetrack

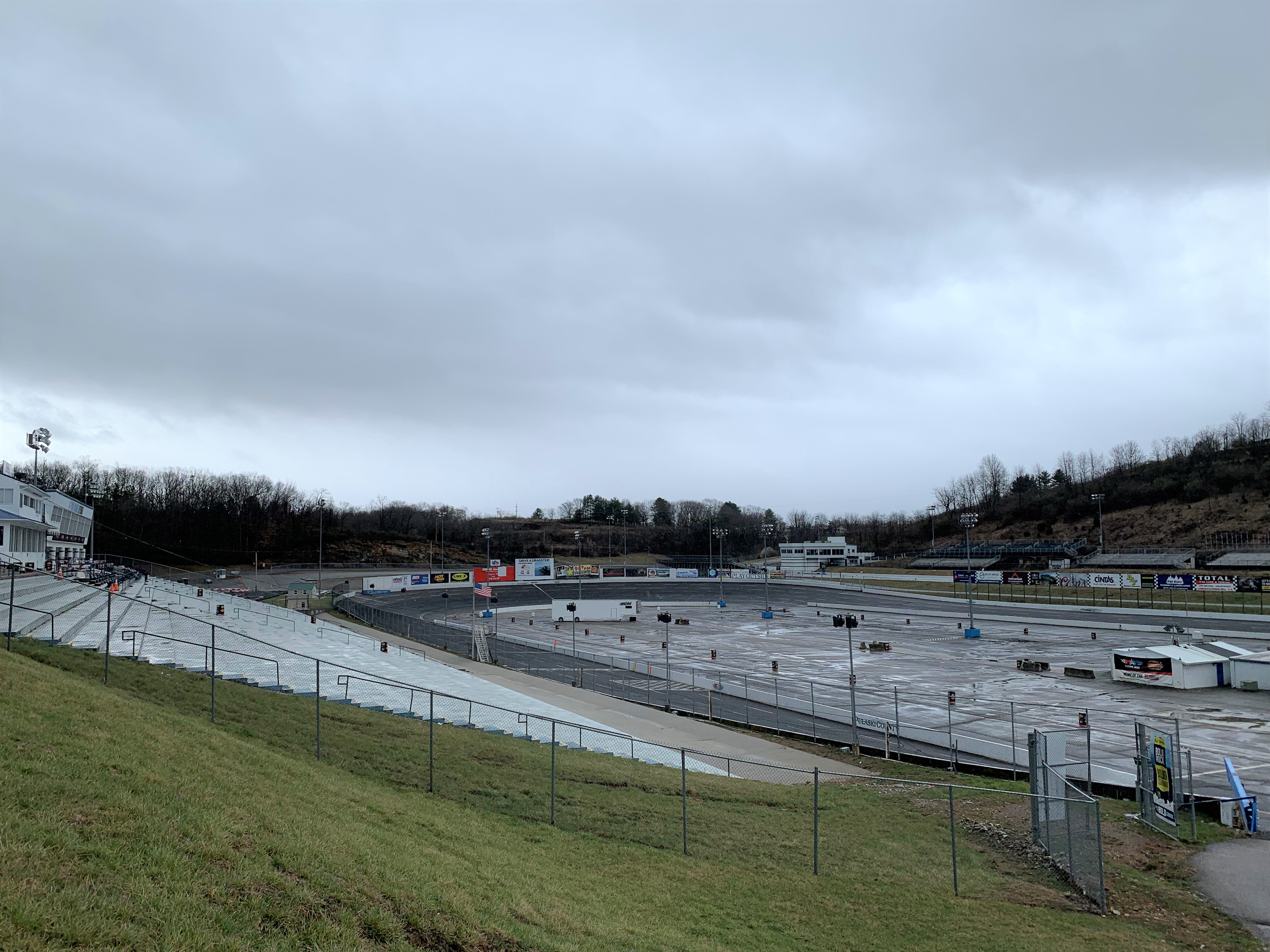
- Pulaski County Motorsports Park racetrack and viewing stand, March 2022
- Location: Fairlawn, Pulaski County, Virginia
- Coordinates: 37°8′34.80″N 80°36′46.80″W
- Capacity: 10,160
- Owner: Shelor Automotive Group (2004–present)
- Opened: 20 July 1952; 74 years ago
- Former names: Motor Mile Speedway (2004–2023); New River Valley Speedway (1992–2004); Pulaski County Speedway (1952–1992)
- Major events: Current: SMART Modified Tour (1989–1991, 2000–2002, 2004–2006, 2021–2023, 2026); Future: CARS Tour (1998–2015, 2019, 2021–2022, 2027); Former: Superstar Racing Experience (2023); NASCAR Busch North Series (2005); ASA National Tour (1999); NASCAR Busch Grand National Series Granger Select 200 (1989–1992)

Oval (1952–present)
- Surface: Asphalt
- Length: 0.416 mi (0.669 km)
- Turns: 4
- Banking: Turns: 15° Straights: 7°

Pulaski County Motorsports Park (formerly Pulaski County Speedway, New River Valley Speedway, then Motor Mile Speedway) is a 0.416 mi (0.669 km) paved oval racetrack in Fairlawn, Virginia. It was purchased by Shelor Automotive Group in 2004 and was subsequently renamed Motor Mile Speedway.

== History ==
The track announced that it has cut all sanctions with NASCAR and discontinued its oval track racing in late 2017 but reopened under NASCAR sanctioning in 2019. However, it continues to use its drag strip behind the back straightaway. In late 2020, the Rusty Wallace Racing Experience signed an agreement to become operator of the track for at least the next two years, with plans to run regular oval- and drag-racing experiences at the track.

Pulaski County Motorsports Park hosted one NASCAR Busch North Series event in 2005. And 3 NASCAR Whelen Southern Modified Tour races between 2005 and 2006.

The facility also hosted 21 X-1R Pro Cup Series races from 1998 until 2014, 4 CARS Super Late Model Tour events in 2015, 2019, 2021–2022 and 4 CARS Late Model Stock Tour races, also in 2015, 2019, 2021–2022. CARS Tour will return there again in 2027. The track also hosted SMART Modified Tour races in 1989–1991, 2000–2002, 2004 and 2021–2023.

Pulaski County Motorsports Park hosted one ASA National Tour event in 1999.

On July 27, 2023, the track hosted the SRX Series, with Kyle Busch winning in his SRX debut.

In 2024, it was announced that the track would not host weekly racing but was open to partnerships with outside promoters for weekly racing however, no events were held in 2024. The track announced that it will continue to look for promoters for the 2025 season.

== Notable weekly drivers ==
- Jeff Agnew won four track titles
- Kyle Dudley 2022 Late Model Stock Car Champion

== NASCAR Busch Series history ==
The track is most famous for hosting 4 NASCAR Busch Series events between 1989 and 1992.

Season	Winning driver	Number
1989	Rick Mast	22
1990	Steve Grissom	63
1991	Chuck Bown	63
1992	Bobby Dotter	08
