= Parker Eatmon =

American racing driver (2006)

- Born: Parker Grey Eatmon; June 23, 2006 (age 20); Wilson, North Carolina, U.S.
- Height: 6 ft 4 in (1.93 m)
- Weight: 175 lb (79 kg)
- Achievements: 2021 INEX Legend Cars National Series Champion; 2024 Thanksgiving Classic Winner

NASCAR FedEx Freight Truck Series career
- 7 races run over 1 year
- 2026 position: 32nd
- Best finish: 32nd (2026)
- First race: 2026 Black's Tire 200 (Rockingham)
- Last race: 2026 RaceToStopSuicide.com 200 (Kansas)
Wins	Top tens	Poles
0	1	0

CARS Late Model Stock Tour career
- Debut season: 2022
- Years active: 2022, 2024–present
- Starts: 32
- Championships: 0
- Wins: 0
- Poles: 0
- Best finish: 8th in 2026
- Statistics up to date as of November 6, 2026.

Parker Grey Eatmon (born June 23, 2006) is an American professional stock car racing driver. He last competed part-time in the NASCAR Craftsman Truck Series, driving the No. 42 Chevrolet Silverado RST for Niece Motorsports. He has previously competed in the zMAX CARS Tour.

== Racing career ==
=== Early career ===
Eatmon first started racing at the age of nine, where he competed in Bandoleros. He also competed in Legends cars, where he won the national championship with 21 feature wins and three national championships.

=== Late Models ===
In 2022, Eatmon made his debut in the CARS Late Model Stock Tour, where he ran two races at Dominion Raceway and South Boston Speedway, finishing fourteenth and eighteenth respectively.

In 2024, Eatmon won the Thanksgiving Classic at Southern National Motorsports Park after starting in nineteenth and taking the lead with ten laps to go. It was also during this year that he returned to the CARS Tour, this time driving the No. 45 for Hedgecock Racing for the final three races of the season.

In 2025, Eatmon joined Mike Darne Racing with plans to run the full schedule in the CARS Late Model Stock Tour. However, after running the first four races, it was announced that Eatmon would move to Hettinger Racing in the No. 71 Chevrolet for the remainder of the season, having previously driven for them at Ace Speedway, replacing Aaron Donnelly.

=== Craftsman Truck Series ===
==== 2026 ====
On December 3, 2025, it was announced that Eatmon will make his NASCAR Craftsman Truck Series debut in 2026, piloting the No. 42 for Niece Motorsports on a part-time basis.

== Personal life ==
Eatmon is currently a student at Wake County Technical Community College, where he is studying construction management technology.

== Motorsports career results ==
=== Career summary ===
Season	Series	Team	Races	Wins	Top 5	Top 10	Points	Position
2022	CARS Late Model Stock Car Tour	N/A	2	0	0	0	34	43rd
2024	CARS Late Model Stock Car Tour	Hedgecock Racing	3	0	0	0	0	NC
2025	CARS Late Model Stock Car Tour	Mike Darne Racing	4	0	0	0	390	12th
2025	CARS Late Model Stock Car Tour	Hettinger Racing	10	0	2	6	390	12th
2026	NASCAR Craftsman Truck Series	Niece Motorsports	5	0	0	1	125	32th
2026	CARS Late Model Stock Car Tour	Matt Piercy Racing	13	0	2	5	386	8th
2026	CARS Pro Late Model Tour	Hettinger Racing	1	0	0	1	33	46th

=== NASCAR ===
(key) (Bold – Pole position awarded by qualifying time. Italics – Pole position earned by points standings or practice time. * – Most laps led.)

==== Craftsman Truck Series ====
NASCAR Craftsman Truck Series results
Year	Team	No.	Make	1	2	3	4	5	6	7	8	9	10	11	12	13	14	15	16	17	18	19	20	21	22	23	24	25	NCTC	Pts	Ref
2026	Niece Motorsports	42	Chevy	DAY	ATL	STP	DAR	CAR; 26	BRI	TEX	GLN	DOV; 21	CLT	NSH	MCH	COR	LRP	NWS	IRP; 12	RCH; 16	NHA; 10	BRI; 31	KAN; 22	CLT	PHO	TAL	MAR	HOM	32nd	125	

^{*} Season still in progress
^{1} Ineligible for series points

=== CARS Late Model Stock Car Tour ===
(key) (Bold – Pole position awarded by qualifying time. Italics – Pole position earned by points standings or practice time. * – Most laps led. ** – All laps led.)

CARS Late Model Stock Car Tour results
Year	Team	No.	Make	1	2	3	4	5	6	7	8	9	10	11	12	13	14	15	16	17	CLMSCTC	Pts	Ref
2022	N/A	4E	Chevy	CRW	HCY	GRE	AAS	FCS	LGY	DOM; 14	HCY	ACE	MMS	NWS	TCM	ACE	SBO; 18	CRW			43rd	34	
2024	Hedgecock Racing	45	N/A	SNM	HCY	AAS	OCS	ACE	TCM	LGY	DOM	CRW	HCY	NWS	ACE	WCS	FLC	SBO; 21	TCM; 27	NWS; 18	N/A	0	
2025	Mike Darne Racing	4E	Chevy	AAS; 14	WCS; 24	CDL; 26	OCS; 29														12th	390	
2025	Hettinger Racing	71	Chevy					ACE; 8	NWS; 16	LGY; 8	DOM; 13	CRW; 16		AND; 9	FLC; 10	SBO; 23	TCM; 4	NWS; 3			12th	390	
2025	Hettinger Racing	2E	Chevy										HCY; DNQ								12th	390	
2026	Matt Piercy Racing	4	Chevy	SNM; 22	WCS; 14	NSV; 2*	CRW; 14	ACE; 13	LGY; 7	DOM; 2	NWS; 20	HCY; 15	AND	FLC; 25	TCM; 16	NPS; 6	SBO; 8				8th	386	

=== CARS Pro Late Model Tour ===
(key)

CARS Pro Late Model Tour results
Year	Team	No.	Make	1	2	3	4	5	6	7	8	9	10	11	CPLMTC	Pts	Ref
2026	Hettinger Racing	51	Chevy	SNM	NSV	CRW	ACE	NWS	HCY	AND	FLC	TCM; 9	NPS	SBO	46th	33	
