= Brandon Lopez =

American racing driver

- Born: May 8, 2000 (age 26) Woodstock, Georgia, U.S.

CARS Late Model Stock Car Tour career
- Debut season: 2025
- Years active: 2025–present
- Starts: 10
- Championships: 0
- Wins: 0
- Poles: 0
- Best finish: 19th in 2026
- Statistics up to date as of October 27, 2026.

Brandon Lopez (born May 8, 2000) is an American professional stock car racing driver and team owner. He currently competes in the zMAX CARS Tour, driving the No. 6 Chevrolet for Bryson Lopez Racing, a team he co-owns with fellow racing driver Dustin Bryson.

On July 3, 2025, Lopez earned his first CARS Pro Late Model Tour victory at Caraway Speedway.

Lopez has also competed in series such as the Carolina Pro Late Model Series, the CRA JEGS All-Stars Tour, the World Series of Asphalt Stock Car Racing, and the NASCAR Weekly Series.

== Motorsports results ==
=== Stock car career summary ===
Season	Series	Team	Races	Wins	Top 5	Top 10	Points	Position
2024	CARS Pro Late Model Tour	Bryson Lopez Racing	12	0	0	3	223	10th
2025	CARS Pro Late Model Tour	Bryson Lopez Racing	13	1	4	8	428	**2nd**
2025	CARS Late Model Stock Car Tour	Bryson Lopez Racing	2	0	1	1	58	39th
2026	ASA STARS National Tour	Bryson Lopez Racing	3	0	0	0		
2026	CARS Pro Late Model Tour	Bryson Lopez Racing	5	0	1	2	160	13th
2026	CARS Late Model Stock Car Tour	Bryson Lopez Racing	8	0	0	0	172	19th

=== CARS Late Model Stock Car Tour ===
(key) (Bold – Pole position awarded by qualifying time. Italics – Pole position earned by points standings or practice time. * – Most laps led. ** – All laps led.)

CARS Late Model Stock Car Tour results
Year	Team	No.	Make	1	2	3	4	5	6	7	8	9	10	11	12	13	14	15	CLMSCTC	Pts	Ref
2025	Bryson Lopez Racing	6	Chevy	AAS	WCS	CDL	OCS	ACE	NWS	LGY	DOM	CRW	HCY	AND	FLC	SBO; 21	TCM	NWS; 5	39th	58	
2026	Bryson Lopez Racing	6	Chevy	SNM; 20	WCS; 16	NSV; 16	CRW; 19	ACE; 24	LGY	DOM	NWS; 25	HCY; 23	AND	FLC	TCM	NPS	SBO; 21		19th	172	

=== CARS Pro Late Model Tour ===
(key)

CARS Pro Late Model Tour results
Year	Team	No.	Make	1	2	3	4	5	6	7	8	9	10	11	12	13	CPLMTC	Pts	Ref
2024	Bryson Lopez Racing	6B	Chevy	SNM; 21	HCY; 15	OCS; 13	ACE; 21	TCM; 10	CRW; 13	HCY	NWS; 19	ACE; 8	FLC; 13	SBO; 7	TCM; 11	NWS; 22	10th	223	
2025	Bryson Lopez Racing	6	Chevy	AAS; 8	CDL; 18												2nd	428	
2025	Bryson Lopez Racing	6L	Chevy			OCS; 11	ACE; 10	NWS; 10	CRW; 1	HCY; 13		AND; 7	FLC; 5	SBO; 3	TCM; 14	NWS; 5	2nd	428	
2025	Bryson Lopez Racing	1X	Chevy								HCY; 21						2nd	428	
2026	Bryson Lopez Racing	6L	Chevy	SNM	NSV; 3	CRW; 18	ACE	NWS; 11	HCY	AND	FLC	TCM; 7	NPS; 11	SBO			13th	160	

=== ASA STARS National Tour ===
(key) (Bold – Pole position awarded by qualifying time. Italics – Pole position earned by points standings or practice time. * – Most laps led. ** – All laps led.)

ASA STARS National Tour results
Year	Team	No.	Make	1	2	3	4	5	6	7	8	9	10	11	ASNTC	Pts	Ref
2026	Bryson Lopez Racing	6	Chevy	NSM; DNQ	FIF	HCY; 18	SLG	MAD	NPS	OWO	TRI; 18	WIN	NSV; 12	NSM	-*	-*	
