= Sam Butler (racing driver) =

American racing driver

- Born: January 8, 2004 (age 22) Delphi, Indiana, U.S.

CARS Late Model Stock Tour career
- Debut season: 2020
- Years active: 2020–2021, 2024–present
- Starts: 19
- Championships: 0
- Wins: 0
- Poles: 0
- Best finish: 17th in 2021
- Statistics up to date as of September 13, 2026.

Samuel Butler (born January 8, 2004) is an American professional stock car racing driver. He currently competes in the zMAX CARS Tour, driving the No. 16B Dodge for R&S Race Cars.

Butler is a former student at Delphi Community High School.

Butler has also competed in the NASCAR Weekly Series, and is a regular competitor in bandoleros.

== Motorsports results ==
=== CARS Late Model Stock Car Tour ===
(key) (Bold – Pole position awarded by qualifying time. Italics – Pole position earned by points standings or practice time. * – Most laps led. ** – All laps led.)

CARS Late Model Stock Car Tour results
Year	Team	No.	Make	1	2	3	4	5	6	7	8	9	10	11	12	13	14	15	16	17	CLMSCTC	Pts	Ref
2020	Triple R Racing	81B	Toyota	SNM	ACE	HCY; 11															28th	49	
2020	Triple R Racing	81B	Chevy				HCY; 6	DOM	FCS	LGY	CCS	FLO	GRE								28th	49	
2021	Triple R Racing	81B	Chevy	DIL; 3	HCY; 3	OCS; 28	ACE; 6	CRW; 18	LGY; 12	DOM; 22											17th	164	
2021	Triple R Racing	8B	Chevy								HCY; 8	MMS	TCM	FLC	WKS	SBO					17th	164	
2024	JM Racing	14	N/A	SNM	HCY; 27	AAS	OCS	ACE	TCM	LGY	DOM	CRW	HCY	NWS	ACE	WCS	FLC	SBO	TCM	NWS	N/A	0	
2025	JM Racing	14	N/A	AAS	WCS	CDL	OCS	ACE	NWS; 34	LGY	DOM	CRW									75th	24	
2025	Nelson Motorsports	2	Toyota										HCY; 18	AND	FLC	SBO	TCM	NWS			75th	24	
2026	R&S Race Cars	16B	Dodge	SNM; 12	WCS; 2	NSV; 13	CRW; 18	ACE; 18	LGY	DOM	NWS	HCY	AND	FLC							20th	169	
2026	R&S Race Cars	10	Dodge												TCM; 21	NPS	SBO				20th	169	
