= Chase Burrow =

American racing driver

- Born: November 2, 2004 (age 22) King William, Virginia, U.S.

CARS Late Model Stock Tour career
- Debut season: 2022
- Years active: 2022–present
- Starts: 66
- Championships: 0
- Wins: 1
- Poles: 1
- Best finish: 5th in 2026

Awards
- 2022 CARS Late Model Stock Tour Rookie of the Year
- Statistics up to date as of October 21, 2026.

Chase Burrow (born November 2, 2004) is an American professional stock car racing driver. He currently competes in the zMAX CARS Tour, driving the No. 5B for Hettinger Racing. He is a former rookie of the year in the series, having won it in 2022 after finishing ninth in the points standings.

On May 31, 2025, Burrow earned his first career win in the CARS Tour at Langley Speedway.

Before the 2026 season, Burrow competed in Kaulig Racing's "Race For the Seat", competing against 14 other drivers to try to win a full-season ride in the teams No. 14 truck.

Burrow has also competed in the Virginia Late Model Triple Crown Series, the FASTRAK Racing Series, the Virginia Sprint Series, and the NASCAR Weekly Series.

== Motorsports results ==
=== CARS Late Model Stock Car Tour ===
(key) (Bold – Pole position awarded by qualifying time. Italics – Pole position earned by points standings or practice time. * – Most laps led. ** – All laps led.)

CARS Late Model Stock Car Tour results
Year	Team	No.	Make	1	2	3	4	5	6	7	8	9	10	11	12	13	14	15	16	17	CLMSCTC	Pts	Ref
2022	Edwards Racing Enterprises	8B	Chevy	CRW; 6	HCY; 5	GPS; 25	AAS; 7	FCS; 23	LGY; 20	DOM; 10	HCY; 16	ACE; 7	MMS; 20	NWS; 13	TCM; 7	ACE; 9	SBO; 22	CRW; 9			9th	297	
2023	Edwards Racing Enterprises	8B	Chevy	SNM; 9	FLC; 25	HCY; 17	ACE; 26	NWS; 33	LGY; 8	DOM; 20	**CRW**; 22		ACE; 19	TCM; 15	WKS; 13	AAS; 14	SBO; 8	TCM; 19	CRW; 20		15th	253	
2023	Edwards Racing Enterprises	41S	Chevy									HCY; 12									15th	253	
2024	Chase Burrow Motorsports	00	Chevy	SNM; 4	HCY	AAS	OCS; 5	ACE	TCM; 2	LGY	DOM; 26	CRW	HCY	NWS; 16	ACE	WCS	FLC; 18		TCM; 5	NWS; 19	20th	177	
2024	Chase Burrow Motorsports	00B	Chevy															SBO; 25			20th	177	
2025	Chase Burrow Motorsports	00	Toyota	AAS; DNQ	WCS; 16	CDL	OCS; 8	ACE; 14	NWS; 22	LGY; 1	DOM; 9	CRW; 6	HCY; 11	AND; 4	FLC; 20	SBO; 12	TCM; 30	NWS; 18			13th	384	
2026	Hettinger Racing	5B	Ford	SNM; 16	WCS; 3	NSV; 9	CRW; 11	ACE; 8	LGY; 9	DOM; 14	NWS; 27	HCY; 7	AND; 16	FLC; 10	TCM; 4	NPS; 21	SBO; 18				5th	420	
