= Conner Jones =

American racing driver (born 2006)

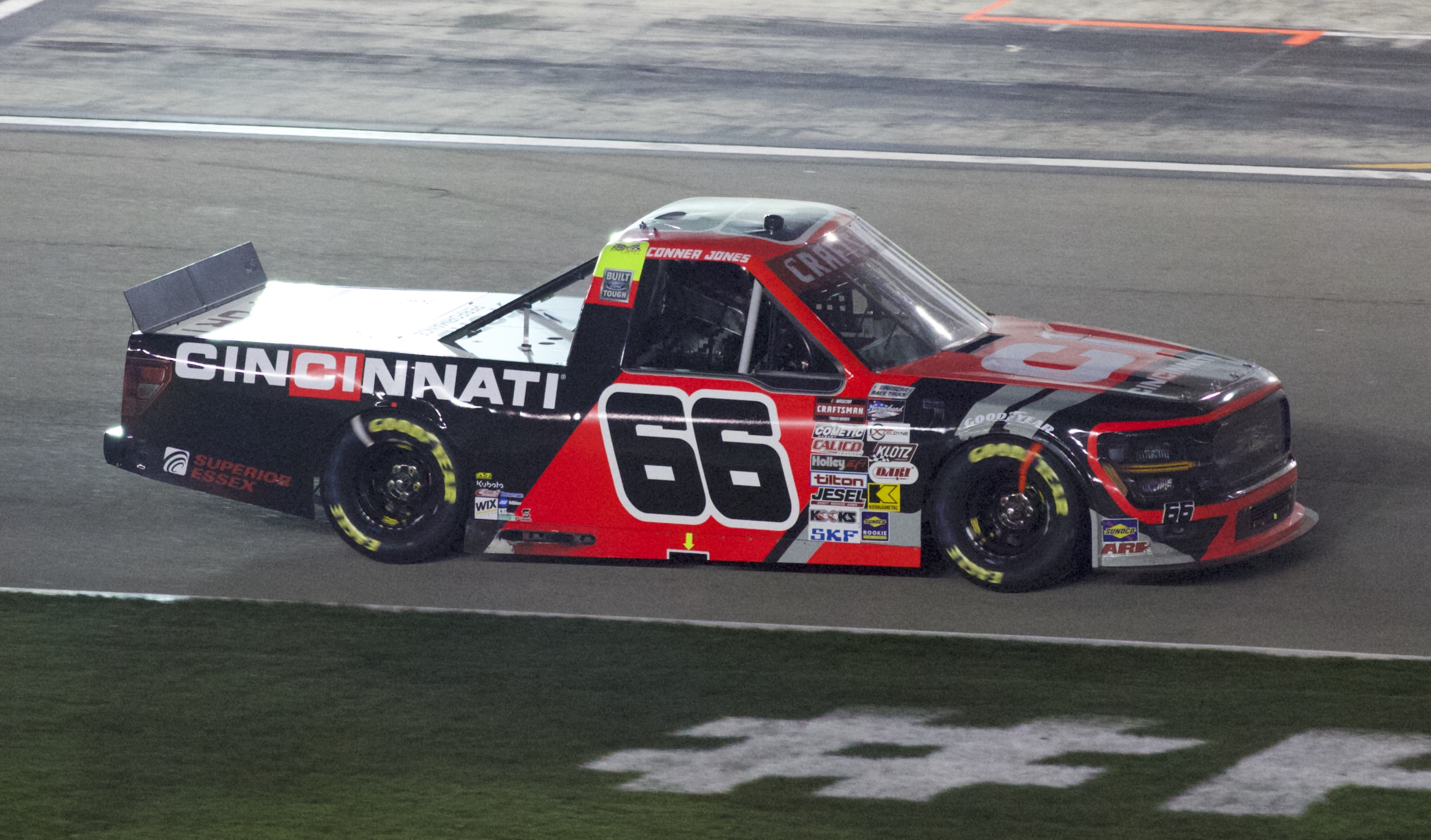
- Jones' No. 66 truck at Las Vegas Motor Speedway in 2024
- Born: February 22, 2006 (age 20); Fredericksburg, Virginia, U.S.
- Achievements: 2023 World Series of Asphalt Pro Late Model Champion; 2024 Battle of the Stars Winner

NASCAR FedEx Freight Truck Series career
- 33 races run over 4 years
- 2026 position: 42nd
- Best finish: 31st (2024)
- First race: 2023 Long John Silver's 200 (Martinsville)
- Last race: 2026 Black's Tire 200 (Martinsville)
Wins	Top tens	Poles
0	0	0

ARCA Menards Series career
- 14 races run over 3 years
- Best finish: 15th (2023)
- First race: 2021 Shore Lunch 150 (Iowa)
- Last race: 2023 Bush's Beans 200 (Bristol)
Wins	Top tens	Poles
0	11	0

ARCA Menards Series East career
- 11 races run over 3 years
- Best finish: 8th (2023)
- First race: 2021 Crosley Record Pressing 200 (Nashville Fairgrounds)
- Last race: 2023 Bush's Beans 200 (Bristol)
Wins	Top tens	Poles
0	9	0

ARCA Menards Series West career
- 3 races run over 3 years
- Best finish: 41st (2022)
- First race: 2021 Arizona Lottery 100 (Phoenix)
- Last race: 2023 General Tire 150 (Phoenix)
Wins	Top tens	Poles
0	1	0
- Statistics up to date as of November 6, 2026.

Conner Jones (born February 22, 2006) is an American professional stock car racing driver. He last competed part-time in the NASCAR Craftsman Truck Series, driving the No. 4/42 Chevrolet Silverado RST for Niece Motorsports. He has previously competed in the zMAX CARS Tour.

== Racing career ==
=== Early years ===
Jones would start racing at five years old, driving in go-karts. In 2017, he would win the Bandolero Bandit Virginia state championship. In 2018, he made his debut in Legends car racing, and would get his first career win at Dominion Raceway. He drove in the INEX Virginia State Young Lions full-time in 2019, where he won the championship with six wins, twelve second-place finishes, and two third-place finishes. He made his debut in late model racing that year, finishing third in his first ever late model start at Hickory Motor Speedway.

Jones drove in the NASCAR Advance Auto Parts Weekly Series in 2020, primarily racing at Hickory Motor Speedway and Dominion Raceway. He would rank eleventh at Hickory and thirteenth at Dominion. The following year, he would run the full CARS Late Model Stock Tour season, driving for GMS Racing at Caraway and JR Motorsports in four races. He would end up eleventh in point standings, getting three top-tens. In 2022, Jones returned to the CLMST, winning at Hudson and improving to tenth overall.

=== ARCA years ===
On May 1, 2021, Jones signed with GMS Racing to drive at the Nashville Fairgrounds in the ARCA Menards Series East. He started eighth and finished fourth. He would later contest two events with Cook-Finley Racing, finishing 21st at Iowa and tenth at Bristol, races that were joint events with the ARCA Menards Series. Jones also raced in the final round of the ARCA Menards Series West for Steve McGowan Motorsports at Phoenix Raceway.

For the 2022 season, Jones joined Venturini Motorsports to run a partial schedule in the ARCA Menards and ARCA East series. In seven starts he scored a total of three top tens, with a best result of third coming in the East Series at Dover. 2023 saw Jones make further starts in ARCA, as he took three top-five finishes in the main series.

=== Craftsman Truck Series ===
On February 13, 2023, ThorSport Racing announced that Jones would drive nine races for the team in the 2023 season, piloting the No. 66 truck. He earned four top-20 finishes throughout the season and finished 33rd in points. Following the year, it was announced that Jones would return to ThorSport's No. 66 in 2024, once again on a part-time basis. Jones failed to break into the top-ten, scoring a total of six top-twenties and only improving to 31st in points despite making a total of thirteen starts. His year would primarily be remembered for a retaliation against Matt Mills at Homestead: Jones intentionally wrecked Mills into the outside wall; the crash caused the Niece Motorsports truck to catch on fire, hospitalizing Mills. After being parked for two laps by NASCAR during the race, Jones was suspended for the Martinsville race the subsequent week.

On January 13, 2025, it was reported that Jones would not return to ThorSport Racing for the 2025 season.

=== CARS Tour ===
During the South Carolina 400 in 2024, Jones got involved in an altercation with Mason Diaz after slamming the door of Diaz's car during a crash; Jones started a fight.

== Personal life ==
Conner Jones was born in Fredericksburg, Virginia. His father, Robert Jones, founded Jones Utilities Construction Inc. in 1997, a full-service underground utility and fiber optic construction contractor that sponsors much of his racing endeavors.

== Motorsports career results ==
=== Stock car career summary ===
Season	Series	Team	Races	Wins	Top 5	Top 10	Points	Position
2021	CARS Late Model Stock Car Tour		13	0	0	3	241	11th
2021	ARCA Menards Series West	Steve McGowan Motorsports	1	0	0	0	25	58th
2021	ARCA Menards Series East	GMS Racing	1	0	1	1	97	18th
2021	ARCA Menards Series East	Cook-Finley Racing	2	0	0	1	97	18th
2021	ARCA Menards Series	Cook-Finley Racing	2	0	0	1	57	64th
2022	CARS Late Model Stock Car Tour	Justin Johnson	14	1	1	7	291	10th
2022	ARCA Menards Series West	Venturini Motorsports	1	0	0	0	66	41st
2022	ARCA Menards Series East	Venturini Motorsports	3	0	2	2	97	16th
2022	ARCA Menards Series	Venturini Motorsports	4	0	1	2	122	28th
2023	CARS Late Model Stock Car Tour	Justin Johnson	8	0	2	3	169	19th
2023	ARCA Menards Series West	Venturini Motorsports	1	0	0	1	37	43rd
2023	ARCA Menards Series East	Venturini Motorsports	5	0	1	4	187	9th
2023	ARCA Menards Series	Venturini Motorsports	8	0	3	8	304	15th
2023	NASCAR Craftsman Truck Series	ThorSport Racing	9	0	0	0	111	33rd
2024	CARS Pro Late Model Tour	Conner Jones Racing	6	0	5	6	180	12th
2024	CARS Late Model Stock Car Tour	Mike Darne Racing	12	2	3	6	227	15th
2024	NASCAR Craftsman Truck Series	ThorSport Racing	13	0	0	0	191	31st
2025	CARS Pro Late Model Tour	Conner Jones Racing	6	0	2	5	212	12th
2025	CARS Late Model Stock Car Tour	Mike Darne Racing	15	0	4	6	452	6th
2025	NASCAR Whelen Modified Tour	Jamie Tomaino	3	0	0	0	73	43rd
2025	NASCAR Craftsman Truck Series	Niece Motorsports	5	0	0	0	58	37th
2026	SMART Modified Tour	Sadler-Stanley Racing	1	0	0	0	42	45th
2026	SMART Modified Tour	PSR Racing	1	0	0	0	42	45th
2026	CARS Pro Late Model Tour	Conner Jones Racing	11	0	7	8	389	**3rd**
2026	CARS Late Model Stock Car Tour	Carroll Speedshop	14	2	6	8	483	**3rd**
2026	NASCAR Whelen Modified Tour	PSR Racing	0	0	0	0	0	N/A
2026	NASCAR Craftsman Truck Series	Niece Motorsports	5	0	0	0	62	42nd

^{†} As Jones was a guest driver, he was ineligible for championship points.

=== NASCAR ===
(key) (Bold – Pole position awarded by qualifying time. Italics – Pole position earned by points standings or practice time. * – Most laps led.)

==== Craftsman Truck Series ====
NASCAR Craftsman Truck Series results
Year	Team	No.	Make	1	2	3	4	5	6	7	8	9	10	11	12	13	14	15	16	17	18	19	20	21	22	23	24	25	NCTC	Pts	Ref
2023	ThorSport Racing	66	Ford	DAY	LVS	ATL	COA	TEX	BRD	MAR; 18	KAN	DAR	NWS; 29	CLT	GTW; 33	NSH	MOH; 28	POC	RCH; 20	IRP; 27	MLW; 18	KAN	BRI; 15	TAL	HOM	PHO; 34			33rd	111	
2024	ThorSport Racing	66	Ford	DAY	ATL; 29	LVS; 14	BRI; 19	COA	MAR	TEX; 18	KAN	DAR; 24	NWS; 35	CLT; 11	GTW	NSH; 12	POC	IRP	RCH; 31	MLW; 22	BRI; 36	KAN	TAL	HOM; 25	MAR	PHO; 17			31st	191	
2025	Niece Motorsports	44	Chevy	DAY	ATL	LVS	HOM	MAR	BRI	CAR	TEX	KAN	NWS; 27	CLT	NSH	MCH	POC; 31	LRP	IRP	GLN	RCH	DAR							37th	58	
2025	Niece Motorsports	41	Chevy																				BRI; 18	NHA; 31	ROV	TAL	MAR; 22	PHO	37th	58	
2026	Niece Motorsports	42	Chevy	DAY	ATL	STP	DAR; 16	CAR	BRI	TEX; 33	GLN	DOV	CLT; 14	NSH	MCH	COR	LRP	NWS	IRP	RCH	NHA	BRI	KAN	CLT; 34	PHO	TAL; 27			42nd	62	
2026	Niece Motorsports	4	Chevy																								MAR; 36	HOM	42nd	62	

^{*} Season still in progress
^{1} Ineligible for series points

==== Whelen Modified Tour ====
NASCAR Whelen Modified Tour results
Year	Car owner	No.	Make	1	2	3	4	5	6	7	8	9	10	11	12	13	14	15	16	NWMTC	Pts	Ref
2025	Jamie Tomaino	99	Chevy	NSM	THO	NWS; 32	SEE	RIV	WMM	LMP	MON	MON	THO	RCH; 19	OSW	NHA	RIV	THO	MAR; 8	43rd	73	
2026	PSR Racing	39	N/A	NSM; DNQ	MAR	THO	SEE	RIV	OXF	SEE	CLM	WMM	MON	THO	NHA	STA	OSW	RIV	THO	N/A	0	

=== ARCA Menards Series ===
(key) (Bold – Pole position awarded by qualifying time. Italics – Pole position earned by points standings or practice time. * – Most laps led.)

ARCA Menards Series results
Year	Team	No.	Make	1	2	3	4	5	6	7	8	9	10	11	12	13	14	15	16	17	18	19	20	AMSC	Pts	Ref
2021	Cook-Finley Racing	42	Chevy	DAY	PHO	TAL	KAN	TOL	CLT	MOH	POC	ELK	BLN	IOW; 21	WIN	GLN	MCH	ISF	MLW	DSF	BRI; 10	SLM	KAN	64th	57	
2022	Venturini Motorsports	15	Toyota	DAY	PHO	TAL	KAN	CLT	IOW; 5	BLN	ELK	MOH	POC	IRP	MCH							SLM; 13	TOL	28th	122	
2022	Venturini Motorsports	55	Toyota													GLN; 10	ISF	MLW	DSF	KAN	BRI; 27			28th	122	
2023	Venturini Motorsports	25	Toyota	DAY	PHO; 7	TAL	KAN	CLT	BLN	ELK; 4	MOH; 8		POC; 5	MCH	IRP; 6	GLN	ISF	MLW; 4	DSF	KAN	BRI; 6	SLM	TOL	15th	304	
2023	Venturini Motorsports	15	Toyota									IOW; 8												15th	304	

==== ARCA Menards Series East ====
ARCA Menards Series East results
Year	Team	No.	Make	1	2	3	4	5	6	7	8	AMSEC	Pts	Ref
2021	GMS Racing	21	Chevy	NSM	FIF	NSV; 4	DOV	SNM				18th	97	
2021	Cook-Finley Racing	42	Chevy						IOW; 21	MLW	BRI; 10	18th	97	
2022	Venturini Motorsports	15	Toyota	NSM	FIF	DOV; 3	NSV	IOW; 5	MLW	BRI; 27		20th	97	
2023	Venturini Motorsports	25	Toyota	FIF	DOV; 9	NSV	FRS		IRP; 6	MLW; 4	BRI; 6	8th	238	
2023	Venturini Motorsports	15	Toyota					IOW; 8				8th	238	

==== ARCA Menards Series West ====
ARCA Menards Series West results
Year	Team	No.	Make	1	2	3	4	5	6	7	8	9	10	11	12	AMSWC	Pts	Ref
2021	Steve McGowan Motorsports	17W	Chevy	PHO	SON	IRW	CNS	IRW	PIR	LVS	AAS	PHO; 19				58th	25	
2022	Venturini Motorsports	55	Toyota	PHO	IRW	KCR	PIR	SON	IRW	EVG	PIR	AAS	LVS	PHO; 28		41st	66	
2023	Venturini Motorsports	25	Toyota	PHO; 7	IRW	KCR	PIR	SON	IRW	SHA	EVG	AAS	LVS	MAD	PHO	43rd	37	

=== CARS Late Model Stock Car Tour ===
(key) (Bold – Pole position awarded by qualifying time. Italics – Pole position earned by points standings or practice time. * – Most laps led. ** – All laps led.)

CARS Late Model Stock Car Tour results
Year	Team	No.	Make	1	2	3	4	5	6	7	8	9	10	11	12	13	14	15	16	17	CLMSCTC	Pts	Ref
2021	Robert Jones	14J	Toyota	DIL; 11	HCY; 23																11th	241	
2021	Robert Jones	14J	Chevy			OCS; 14	ACE; 17														11th	241	
2021	GMS Racing	21	Chevy					CRW; 16													11th	241	
2021	JR Motorsports	88	Chevy						LGY; 10	DOM; 11		MMS; 9	TCM; 12								11th	241	
2021	JR Motorsports	01	Chevy								HCY; 9										11th	241	
2021	Robert Jones	9	Ford											FLC; 19	WKS; 15	SBO; 22					11th	241	
2022	Justin Johnson	44	Ford	CRW; 17	HCY; 16	GPS; 9	AAS; 6	FCS; 24	LGY; 17	DOM; 22			MMS; 7	NWS; 20	TCM; 1	ACE; 6	SBO; 12	CRW			10th	291	
2022	Justin Johnson	18	Toyota								HCY; 8										10th	291	
2022	Justin Johnson	44	Toyota									ACE; 10									10th	291	
2023	Mike Darne Racing	44	Ford	SNM	FLC; 4	HCY; 12	ACE; 15	NWS; 17	LGY	DOM; 10	CRW	HCY	ACE	TCM; 19	WKS	AAS; 2	SBO; 17	TCM	CRW		19th	169	
2024	Mike Darne Racing	44	Chevy	SNM	HCY; 26	AAS	OCS	ACE	TCM; 8	LGY; 15	DOM; 4	CRW; 12		NWS; 14	ACE; 10	WCS	FLC; 8	SBO; 19	TCM; 1	NWS; 1	11th	261	
2024	Mike Darne Racing	40	Chevy										HCY; 25								11th	261	
2025	Mike Darne Racing	44	Chevy	AAS; 30	WCS; 20	CDL; 5	OCS; 12	ACE; 3	NWS; 7	LGY; 11	DOM; 12	CRW; 23		AND; 18	FLC; 6	SBO; 2	TCM; 19	NWS; 11			6th	452	
2025	Mike Darne Racing	48	Chevy										HCY; 3								6th	452	
2026	Carroll Speedshop	44	Chevy	SNM; 17	WCS; 1	NSV; 4	CRW; 2*	ACE; 15	LGY; 15	DOM; 18	NWS; 7		AND; 2	FLC; 14	TCM; 1*	NPS; 13	SBO; 4				3rd	483	
2026	Carroll Speedshop	16J	Chevy									HCY; 6									3rd	483	

=== CARS Pro Late Model Tour ===
(key)

CARS Pro Late Model Tour results
Year	Team	No.	Make	1	2	3	4	5	6	7	8	9	10	11	12	13	CPLMTC	Pts	Ref
2024	Conner Jones Racing	44	Toyota	SNM	HCY; 4	OCS; 4	ACE; 5	TCM	CRW; 2	HCY; 2	NWS; 6	ACE	FLC	SBO	TCM	NWS	12th	180	
2025	Conner Jones Racing	44	Chevy	AAS	CDL	OCS	ACE	NWS; 8	CRW; 10	HCY	HCY; 14	AND	FLC; 2*	SBO; 6	TCM	NWS; 3	12th	212	
2026	Conner Jones Racing	44	Chevy	SNM; 24	NSV; 11	CRW; 3	ACE; 6	NWS; 3	HCY; 2	AND; 2	FLC; 5	TCM; 2	NPS; 2	SBO; 18			3rd	389	

=== SMART Modified Tour ===
SMART Modified Tour results
Year	Car owner	No.	Make	1	2	3	4	5	6	7	8	9	10	11	12	13	SMTC	Pts	Ref
2026	Sadler-Stanley Racing	16VA	N/A	FLO	AND	SBO	DOM; 22	HCY	WKS	FCR	CRW	PUL	CAR				45th	42	
2026	PSR Racing	17	N/A											ROU; 18	TRI; Wth	NWS	45th	42	

=== ASA STARS National Tour ===
(key) (Bold – Pole position awarded by qualifying time. Italics – Pole position earned by points standings or practice time. * – Most laps led. ** – All laps led.)

ASA STARS National Tour results
Year	Team	No.	Make	1	2	3	4	5	6	7	8	9	10	11	12	ASNTC	Pts	Ref
2023	Robbie Jones	44	Toyota	FIF	MAD	NWS; 31	HCY	MLW	AND	WIR	TOL	WIN	NSV			102nd	22	
2024	Robbie Jones	44	Toyota	**NSM**; 13	FIF; 13	HCY; 11	MAD	MLW	AND	OWO	TOL	WIN	NSV			24th	129	
2025	Conner Jones Racing	44	Toyota	**NSM**; 28	FIF; 18	DOM	HCY	NPS; 14	MAD	SLG	AND	OWO	TOL	WIN	NSV; 24	25th	148	
2026	Conner Jones Racing	44	Toyota	NSM; 8	FIF; 24	HCY; 24	SLG	MAD	NPS	OWO	TRI; 8	WIN	NSV	NSM		-*	-*	
