= Taylor Satterfield =

American racing driver

- Born: June 17, 1988 (age 38) Nicholson, Georgia, U.S.

CARS Late Model Stock Tour career
- Debut season: 2020
- Years active: 2020, 2022, 2024–present
- Starts: 6
- Championships: 0
- Wins: 0
- Poles: 0
- Best finish: 43rd in 2025
- Statistics up to date as of October 2, 2026.

Taylor Satterfield (born June 17, 1988) is an American professional stock car racing driver. He currently competes in the zMAX CARS Tour, driving the No. 40 for TS Racing.

Satterfield is the owner and founder of Maverick Steele Buildings.

Satterfield has also competed in series such as the ASA Southeast Asphalt Tour, the Georgia Asphalt Series, the Viper Pro Late Model Series, and the NASCAR Weekly Series.

== Motorsports results ==
=== CARS Late Model Stock Car Tour ===
(key) (Bold – Pole position awarded by qualifying time. Italics – Pole position earned by points standings or practice time. * – Most laps led. ** – All laps led.)

CARS Late Model Stock Car Tour results
Year	Team	No.	Make	1	2	3	4	5	6	7	8	9	10	11	12	13	14	15	16	17	CLMSCTC	Pts	Ref
2020	Matthew Edwards	40	Chevy	SNM	ACE	HCY	HCY	DOM	FCS	LGY	CCS	FLO	GRE; 15								44th	18	
2022	Josh McCoy	40	Chevy	CRW	HCY; 20	GRE	AAS	FCS	LGY	DOM	HCY	ACE	MMS	NWS	TCM	ACE	SBO	CRW			66th	13	
2024	TS Racing	40	N/A	SNM	HCY; DNS	AAS	OCS	ACE	TCM	LGY	DOM	CRW	HCY	NWS	ACE	WCS	FLC	SBO	TCM	NWS	N/A	0	
2025	TS Racing	40	N/A	AAS; DNQ	WCS	CDL; 15	OCS	ACE	NWS	LGY	DOM	CRW	HCY	AND; 22	FLC	SBO	TCM	NWS			43rd	52	
2026	TS Racing	40	N/A	SNM	WCS	NSV	CRW	ACE	LGY	DOM	NWS	HCY	AND; 23	FLC	TCM	NPS; 25	SBO				53rd	37	

=== IHRA Late Model Sportsman Series ===
(key) (Bold – Pole position awarded by qualifying time. Italics – Pole position earned by points standings or practice time. * – Most laps led. ** – All laps led.)

IHRA Late Model Sportsman Series
Year	Team	No.	Make	1	2	3	ISCSS	Pts	Ref
2026	TS Racing	40	N/A	DUB	CDL	AND; 29	N/A	0	
