= Matt Cox (racing driver) =

American racing driver

- Born: Little River, South Carolina, U.S.

CARS Late Model Stock Tour career
- Debut season: 2015
- Years active: 2015, 2018–2020, 2024–present
- Starts: 18
- Championships: 0
- Wins: 0
- Poles: 0
- Best finish: 13th in 2020
- Statistics up to date as of September 4, 2026.

Matt Cox (birth date unknown) is an American professional stock car racing driver. He currently competes in the zMAX CARS Tour, driving the No. 51 Chevrolet for Cox Racing.

Cox has also competed in series such as the Virginia Late Model Triple Crown Series, the I-95 Showdown Series, the Allison Legacy Race Series, and the NASCAR Weekly Series, and is former competitor at the now defunct Myrtle Beach Speedway, and a former track champion at Florence Motor Speedway.

== Motorsports results ==
=== CARS Late Model Stock Car Tour ===
(key) (Bold – Pole position awarded by qualifying time. Italics – Pole position earned by points standings or practice time. * – Most laps led. ** – All laps led.)

CARS Late Model Stock Car Tour results
Year	Team	No.	Make	1	2	3	4	5	6	7	8	9	10	11	12	13	14	15	16	17	CLMSCTC	Pts	Ref
2015	Matt Cox	51C	N/A	SNM	ROU	HCY	SNM	TCM	MMS	ROU	CON	MYB; 23	HCY								55th	10	
2018	Matt Cox	51C	Chevy	TCM	MYB; 7	ROU	HCY	BRI	ACE	CCS	KPT	HCY	WKS	ROU	SBO						42nd	26	
2019	Robert Elliott	51	Ford	SNM; 20	HCY	ROU	ACE	MMS; 18	LGY	DOM	CCS; 17	HCY	ROU	SBO							34th	44	
2020	Robert Elliott	51	Chevy	SNM; 12	ACE; 15	HCY; 22	HCY; 11	DOM; 9	FCS; 16	LGY; 13	CCS; 20		GRE; 22								13th	174	
2020	Robert Elliott	95	Chevy									FLO; 17									13th	174	
2024	Matt Cox Racing	51C	Chevy	SNM	HCY	AAS	OCS	ACE	TCM	LGY	DOM	CRW	HCY	NWS	ACE	WCS	FLC; 3	SBO	TCM	NWS	N/A	0	
2025	Matt Cox Racing	51	Chevy	AAS	WCS	CDL	OCS	ACE	NWS	LGY	DOM	CRW	HCY	AND	FLC; 9	SBO	TCM	NWS			55th	35	
2026	Matt Cox Racing	51C	Chevy	SNM	WCS	NSV	CRW	ACE	LGY	DOM	NWS	HCY	AND	FLC; 20	TCM	NPS	SBO				78th	22	

=== IHRA Late Model Sportsman Series ===
(key) (Bold – Pole position awarded by qualifying time. Italics – Pole position earned by points standings or practice time. * – Most laps led. ** – All laps led.)

IHRA Late Model Sportsman Series
Year	Team	No.	Make	1	2	3	ISCSS	Pts	Ref
2026	Matt Cox Racing	51C	N/A	DUB	CDL	AND; 6	N/A	0	
