= Cody Dempster =

American racing driver

- Born: Parker, Colorado, U.S.

CARS Late Model Stock Tour career
- Debut season: 2024
- Years active: 2024–present
- Starts: 7
- Championships: 0
- Wins: 0
- Poles: 0
- Best finish: 77th in 2025
- Statistics up to date as of October 30, 2025.

Cody Dempster (birth date unknown) is an American professional stock car racing driver. He last competed in the zMAX CARS Tour, driving the No. 24 for Cody Dempster Racing.

Dempster started racing at the age of seven, where he competed in go-karts and won ten championships in both the state and national divisions.

Dempster has also competed in series such as the ASA CRA Super Series, the SRL Spears Southwest Tour Series, the Rocky Mountain Legend Racing Association, and the NASCAR Weekly Series, and is a former track champion at Colorado National Speedway.

== Motorsports results ==
=== CARS Late Model Stock Car Tour ===
(key) (Bold – Pole position awarded by qualifying time. Italics – Pole position earned by points standings or practice time. * – Most laps led. ** – All laps led.)

CARS Late Model Stock Car Tour results
Year	Team	No.	Make	1	2	3	4	5	6	7	8	9	10	11	12	13	14	15	16	17	CLMSCTC	Pts	Ref
2024	Cody Dempster Racing	24	Toyota	SNM; DNQ																	N/A	0	
2024	Cody Dempster Racing	24	Chevy		HCY; 11	AAS; 13	OCS	ACE	TCM	LGY; 23	DOM	CRW	HCY; 15	NWS	ACE	WCS	FLC	SBO; 24	TCM; 11	NWS	N/A	0	
2025	Cody Dempster Racing	24	Chevy	AAS	WCS	CDL; 24	OCS	ACE	NWS; DNQ	LGY	DOM	CRW	HCY	AND	FLC	SBO	TCM	NWS			77th	23	

=== CARS Super Late Model Tour ===
(key)

CARS Super Late Model Tour results
Year	Team	No.	Make	1	2	3	4	5	6	7	8	CSLMTC	Pts	Ref
2020	N/A	24	Chevy	SNM	HCY	JEN	HCY	FCS	BRI	FLC	NSH; 14	N/A	0	

=== CARS Pro Late Model Tour ===
(key)

CARS Pro Late Model Tour results
Year	Team	No.	Make	1	2	3	4	5	6	7	8	9	10	11	CPLMTC	Pts	Ref
2026	Cody Dempster Racing	24	N/A	SNM	NSV; 10	CRW	ACE	NWS	HCY	AND	FLC	TCM	NPS	SBO	47th	32	
