= Buddy Isles Jr. =

American racing driver

- Born: 1989 or 1990 (age 36–37) Littleton, North Carolina, U.S.

CARS Late Model Stock Tour career
- Debut season: 2023
- Years active: 2023–present
- Starts: 25
- Championships: 0
- Wins: 0
- Poles: 0
- Best finish: 13th in 2024
- Statistics up to date as of July 30, 2025.

Buddy Isles Jr. (born 1989 or 1990) is an American professional stock car racing driver. He last competed in the zMAX CARS Tour, driving the No. 11 Chevrolet for Vandyke Racing Performance. Isles races the No. 11 as a tribute to the "Flying No. 11" previously driven by Ray Hendrick.

Isles previously worked as a fabricator for ThorSport Racing and the No. 88 driven by Matt Crafton in 2015, and is the owner of Buddy Isles Tire and Automotive.

Isles has also competed in series such as the Virginia Late Model Triple Crown Series, the I-95 Late Model Challenge, the Ultimate Street Stock East Region, and the NASCAR Weekly Series.

== Motorsports results ==
=== CARS Late Model Stock Car Tour ===
(key) (Bold – Pole position awarded by qualifying time. Italics – Pole position earned by points standings or practice time. * – Most laps led. ** – All laps led.)

CARS Late Model Stock Car Tour results
Year	Team	No.	Make	1	2	3	4	5	6	7	8	9	10	11	12	13	14	15	16	17	CLMSCTC	Pts	Ref
2023	N/A	11B	Chevy	SNM	FLC	HCY	ACE	NWS	LGY	DOM	CRW	HCY	ACE	TCM	WKS; 15	AAS	SBO	TCM	CRW		59th	18	
2024	Mike Darne Racing	11	Chevy	SNM; 12	HCY; 19	AAS; 17	OCS; 19	ACE; 23	TCM; 12	LGY; 24	DOM; 23	CRW	HCY; 21		ACE; 7	WCS; 16			TCM; 14	NWS; 26	13th	236	
2024	Vandyke Racing Performance	11V	Chevy											NWS; 24			FLC; 26	SBO; 9			13th	236	
2025	Vandyke Racing Performance	11	Chevy	AAS; 12	WCS; 15	CDL; 7	OCS; 19	ACE; 13	NWS; 12	LGY; 9	DOM; 22	CRW	HCY	AND	FLC	SBO	TCM	NWS			20th	227	
