= Daniel Vuncannon =

American racing driver

- Born: February 14, 1985 (age 41) Fuquay-Varina, North Carolina, U.S.

CARS Late Model Stock Tour career
- Debut season: 2021
- Years active: 2021, 2024–present
- Starts: 3
- Championships: 0
- Wins: 0
- Poles: 0
- Best finish: 43rd in 2021
- Statistics up to date as of October 12, 2026.

Daniel Vuncannon (born February 14, 1985) is an American professional stock car racing driver. He currently competes in the zMAX CARS Tour, driving the No. 50 for Sent Racing.

Vuncannon has also competed in the All-Pro Limited Late Model Series, the I-95 Showdown Series, the IHRA Stock Car Series, and the NASCAR Local Racing Series, and is a regular competitor at Wake County Speedway.

== Motorsports results ==
=== CARS Late Model Stock Car Tour ===
(key) (Bold – Pole position awarded by qualifying time. Italics – Pole position earned by points standings or practice time. * – Most laps led. ** – All laps led.)

CARS Late Model Stock Car Tour results
| Year | Team | No. | Make | 1 | 2 | 3 | 4 | 5 | 6 | 7 | 8 | 9 | 10 | 11 | 12 | 13 | 14 | 15 | 16 | 17 | CLMSCTC | Pts | Ref |
|---|---|---|---|---|---|---|---|---|---|---|---|---|---|---|---|---|---|---|---|---|---|---|---|
| 2021 | Daniel Vuncannon | 50 | Chevy | DIL | HCY | OCS | ACE | CRW | LGY | DOM | HCY | MMS | TCM | FLC | WKS; 12 | SBO | | | | | 43rd | 21 | |
| 2024 | Sent Racing | 50 | N/A | SNM | HCY | AAS | OCS | ACE | TCM | LGY | DOM | CRW | HCY | NWS | ACE | WCS; 18 | FLC | SBO | TCM | NWS | N/A | 0 | |
| 2025 | Sent Racing | 50 | N/A | AAS | WCS; DNS | CDL | OCS | ACE | NWS | LGY | DOM | CRW | HCY | AND | FLC | SBO | TCM | NWS | | | 100th | 5 | |
| 2026 | Sent Racing | 50 | N/A | SNM | WCS; 26 | NSV | CRW | ACE | LGY | DOM | NWS | HCY | AND | FLC | TCM | NPS | SBO | | | | 90th | 16 | |

=== IHRA Late Model Sportsman Series ===
(key) (Bold – Pole position awarded by qualifying time. Italics – Pole position earned by points standings or practice time. * – Most laps led. ** – All laps led.)

IHRA Late Model Sportsman Series
| Year | Team | No. | Make | 1 | 2 | 3 | ISCSS | Pts | Ref |
|---|---|---|---|---|---|---|---|---|---|
| 2026 | Sent Racing | 50 | N/A | DUB; 13 | CDL | AND | N/A | 0 | |
