= Cameron Bolin =

American racing driver (born 2004)

- Born: December 7, 2004 (age 21) Sharon, South Carolina, U.S.

CARS Late Model Stock Tour career
- Debut season: 2020
- Years active: 2020, 2022–present
- Starts: 20
- Championships: 0
- Wins: 0
- Poles: 0
- Best finish: 17th in 2023

Awards
- 2023 CARS Late Model Stock Tour Rookie of the Year
- Statistics up to date as of October 7, 2025.

Cameron Bolin (born December 7, 2004) is an American professional stock car racing driver. He last competed in the zMAX CARS Tour, driving the No. 67 for Bolin Family Racing. He a former rookie of the year of the series' Late Model Stock division, having won honors in 2023.

Bolin has also competed in series such as the Southeast Legends Tour, the INEX Nashville Spring Series, the INEX Summer Shootout Series, and the NASCAR Weekly Series, and is a former track champion at Greenville-Pickens Speedway, where he became the youngest track champion at the age of fifteen.

== Motorsports results ==
=== CARS Late Model Stock Car Tour ===
(key) (Bold – Pole position awarded by qualifying time. Italics – Pole position earned by points standings or practice time. * – Most laps led. ** – All laps led.)

CARS Late Model Stock Car Tour results
Year	Team	No.	Make	1	2	3	4	5	6	7	8	9	10	11	12	13	14	15	16	17	CLMSCTC	Pts	Ref
2020	Bolin Family Racing	67	Chevy	SNM	ACE	HCY	HCY	DOM	FCS	LGY	CCS	FLO	GRE; 14								42nd	19	
2022	Bolin Family Racing	67	Chevy	CRW	HCY	GRE; 20	AAS	FCS	LGY	DOM	HCY	ACE	MMS	NWS	TCM	ACE	SBO	CRW			64th	13	
2023	Bolin Family Racing	67	Ford	SNM; 18	FLC; 28	HCY; 23	ACE; DNQ	NWS; 20	LGY												17th	205	
2023	Bolin Family Racing	67	Chevy							DOM; 17	CRW; 8	HCY; 20	ACE; 18	TCM; 10	WKS; 17	AAS; 19	SBO; 18	TCM; 22	CRW; 21		17th	205	
2024	Bolin Family Racing	67	Chevy	SNM; 23	HCY; 28	AAS	OCS	ACE	TCM; 26	LGY	DOM	CRW	HCY	NWS; 30	ACE	WCS	FLC	SBO	TCM	NWS	N/A	0	
2025	Bolin Family Racing	67	Chevy	AAS	WCS	CDL	OCS	ACE	NWS; DNQ	LGY	DOM	CRW	HCY	AND	FLC	SBO	TCM	NWS			101st	5	

=== CARS Pro Late Model Tour ===
(key)

CARS Pro Late Model Tour results
Year	Team	No.	Make	1	2	3	4	5	6	7	8	9	10	11	12	13	CPLMTC	Pts	Ref
2024	Bolin Family Racing	67	Chevy	SNM	HCY	OCS	ACE	TCM	CRW	HCY	NWS	ACE	FLC; 5	SBO; 11	TCM; 8	NWS; 3	19th	105	
