= Ryan Glenski =

American racing driver

- Born: October 21, 1992 (age 34); Mooresville, North Carolina, U.S.

ARCA Menards Series career
- 1 race run over 1 year
- Best finish: 92nd (2011)
- First race: 2011 Ansell Protective Gloves 200 (IRP)
Wins	Top tens	Poles
0	1	0
- Statistics up to date as of October 15, 2025.

Ryan Glenski (born October 21, 1992) is an American professional stock car racing driver who has previously competed in the ARCA Racing Series and the CARS Late Model Stock Tour.

Glenski has also competed in series such as the Virginia Late Model Triple Crown Series, the Southeast Limited Late Model Series, the Allison Legacy Race Series, and the NASCAR Weekly Series.

== Motorsports results ==
=== ARCA Racing Series ===
(key) (Bold – Pole position awarded by qualifying time. Italics – Pole position earned by points standings or practice time. * – Most laps led.)

ARCA Racing Series results
Year	Team	No.	Make	1	2	3	4	5	6	7	8	9	10	11	12	13	14	15	16	17	18	19	ARSC	Pts	Ref
2011	Fast Track Racing	11	Ford	DAY	TAL	SLM	TOL	NJE	CHI	POC	MCH	WIN	BLN	IOW	IRP; 6	POC	ISF	MAD	DSF	SLM	KAN	TOL	92nd	200	

=== CARS Late Model Stock Car Tour ===
(key) (Bold – Pole position awarded by qualifying time. Italics – Pole position earned by points standings or practice time. * – Most laps led. ** – All laps led.)

CARS Late Model Stock Car Tour results
Year	Team	No.	Make	1	2	3	4	5	6	7	8	9	10	11	12	13	14	15	16	17	CLMSCTC	Pts	Ref
2021	Randy Glenski	28	Chevy	DIL	HCY	ROU	ACE	CRW	LGY	DOM	HCY	MMS	TCM	FLC; 6	WKS	SBO					36th	27	
2023	Ryan Glenski Racing	28	Chevy	SNM	FLC; 8	HCY	ACE; DNQ	NWS	LGY	DOM	CRW	HCY	ACE	TCM	WKS	AAS	SBO	TCM	CRW		41st	27	
2024	Ryan Glenski Racing	28G	Chevy	SNM	HCY	AAS	OCS	ACE	TCM	LGY	DOM	CRW	HCY	NWS	ACE	WCS	FLC; 7	SBO	TCM	NWS	N/A	0	
2025	Ryan Glenski Racing	28	Chevy	AAS	WCS	CDL	OCS	ACE	NWS	LGY	DOM	CRW	HCY	AND	FLC; 5	SBO	TCM	NWS			54th	37	
2026	Ryan Glenski Racing	28	Chevy	SNM	WCS	NSV	CRW	ACE	LGY	DOM	NWS	HCY	AND	FLC; 12	TCM	NPS	SBO				60th	30	
