= 2025 CARS Tour =

29th season of the CARS Tour

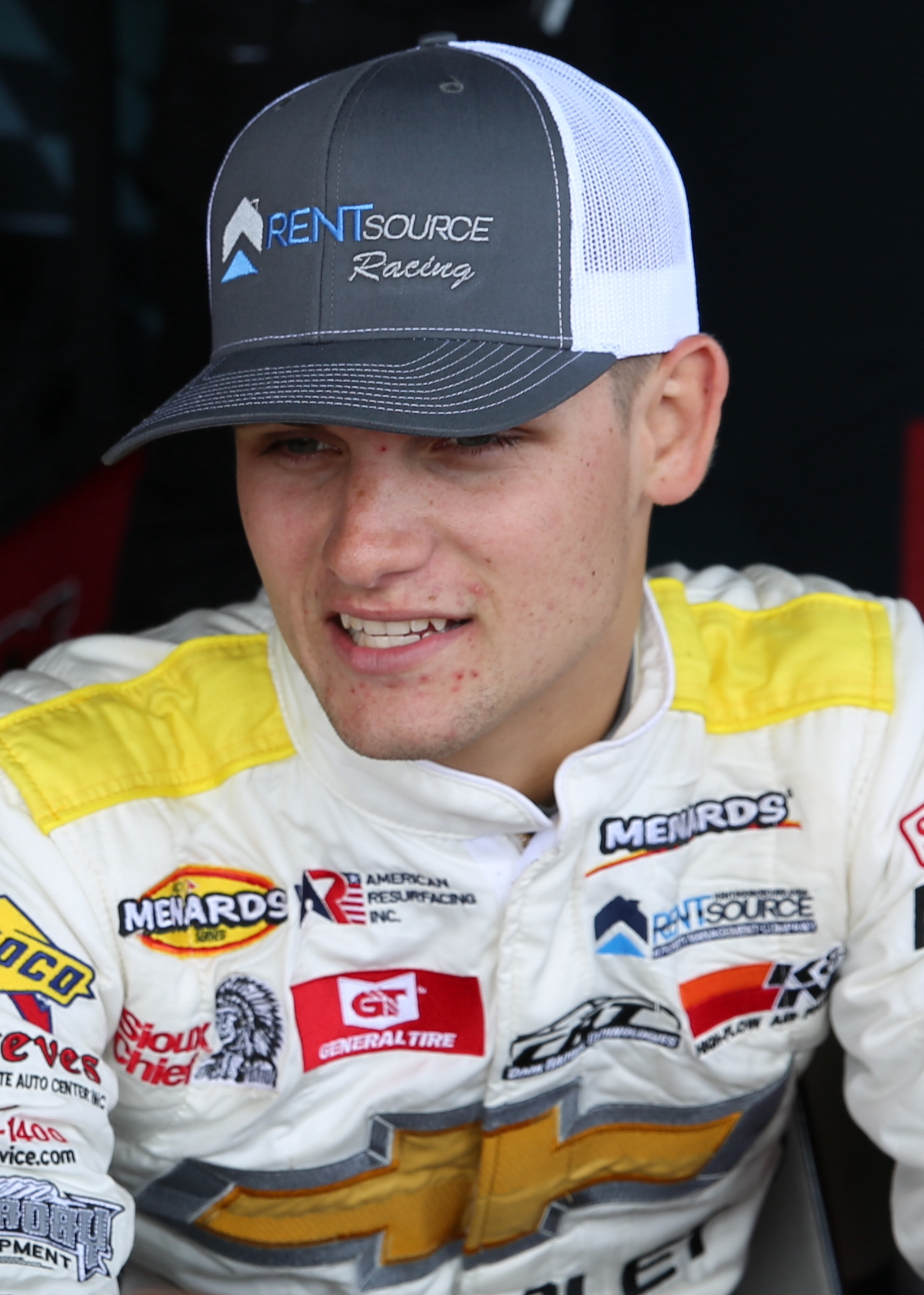
Landen Lewis, the 2025 Late Model Stock Car champion.

The 2025 CARS Tour was the 29th season of the zMAX CARS Tour, a stock car racing series. It began at New River All-American Speedway on March 1 and ended at North Wilkesboro Speedway on October 15. Landen Lewis won the Late Model Stock Tour championship, while Ben Maier won the Pro Late Model Tour championship.

Brenden Queen entered the season as the defending Late Model Stock Tour champion, while Kaden Honeycutt entered as the Pro Late Model Tour champion. They both did not return full-time in the series in 2025, with Queen moving on to run full-time in the ARCA Menards Series, and Honeycutt running full-time in the NASCAR Craftsman Truck Series.

The series made its Fox Sports 1 broadcast debut during the NASCAR All-Star Race weekend at North Wilkesboro Speedway.

== Schedule & results ==
Date	Track	Location	LMSC Winner	PLM Winner
March 1	New River All-American Speedway	Jacksonville, North Carolina	Connor Hall	Jade Avedisian
March 29	Wake County Speedway	Raleigh, North Carolina	Timothy "Mini" Tyrrell Jr.	N/A
April 12	Cordele Motor Speedway	Cordele, Georgia	Connor Hall	Tristan McKee
April 26	Orange County Speedway	Rougemont, North Carolina	Jared Fryar	Luke Baldwin
May 3	Ace Speedway	Altamahaw, North Carolina	Landen Lewis	Carson Ware
May 15-16	North Wilkesboro Speedway	North Wilkesboro, North Carolina	Landen Lewis	Kaden Honeycutt
June 1	Larry King Law's Langley Speedway	Hampton, Virginia	Chase Burrow	N/A
June 14	Dominion Raceway	Thornburg, Virginia	Timothy "Mini" Tyrrell Jr.	N/A
July 2	Caraway Speedway	Asheboro, North Carolina	Jared Fryar	Brandon Lopez
July 12	Hickory Motor Speedway	Hickory, North Carolina	N/A	Keelan Harvick
August 3 (Note: Race was postponed from August 2 due to weather)	Hickory Motor Speedway	Hickory, North Carolina	Timothy "Mini" Tyrrell Jr.	Spencer Davis
August 16	Anderson Motor Speedway	Williamston, South Carolina	Landen Lewis	Luke Baldwin
August 29	Florence Motor Speedway	Timmonsville, South Carolina	Landen Lewis	Keelan Harvick
September 13	South Boston Speedway	South Boston, Virginia	Kaden Honeycutt	Keelan Harvick
October 4	Tri-County Speedway	Granite Falls, North Carolina	Jared Fryar	T. J. DeCaire
October 18	North Wilkesboro Speedway	North Wilkesboro, North Carolina	Caden Kvapil	Keelan Harvick

== Standings ==
=== Late Model Stock Car championship ===
(key) Bold – Pole position awarded by time. Italics – Pole position set by final practice results or rainout. * – Most laps led.

Pos	Driver	AAS	WCS	CDL	OCS	ACE	NWS	LGY	DOM	CRW	HCY	AND	FLC	SBO	TCM	NWS	Points
1	Landen Lewis	11	5	4	9	1*	**1****	19*	10	13	20	1	1*	4*	9	7	546
2	Connor Hall	**1***	2	1	18	11	10	7	2	12	14	5	2	18	3	4	536
3	Kade Brown	8	4	6	2	6	14	10	15	8	6	8	8	8	11	8	509
4	Landon Huffman	15	12	3	7	5	6	13	17	20	4	2	14	10	6	20	478
5	Mini Tyrrell	21	**1****	2*	26	17	3	20	**1****	24*	1	6	17	**17**	20	15	467
6	Conner Jones	30	20	5	12	3	7	11	12	23	3	18	6	2	19	11	452
7	Carson Loftin	4	23	9	23	12	5	17	24	9	24	15	7	3	7	10	442
8	Doug Barnes Jr.	7	3	10	25	10	20	18	6	5	5	14	25	22	15	12	433
9	Donovan Strauss	9	8	18	10	9	15	12	19	7	15	11	12	15	27	22	423
10	Ronnie Bassett Jr.	3	6	14	5	18	18	6	18	4	13	13	16	19	29	28	420
11	Lanie Buice	10	21	20	28	4	32	23	5	18	8	12	13	6	10	9	417
12	Parker Eatmon	14	24	26	29	8	16	8	13	16	DNQ	9	10	23	4	3	390
13	Chase Burrow	DNQ	16		8	14	22	1	9	6	11	4	20	12	30	18	384
14	Brandon Pierce	25	9	22	17	20	11	14	16	19	DNQ	17	11	16	5	19	373
15	Tristan McKee	18	19	19			2	4	4	3	**22***	7		7			320
16	Chad McCumbee	19	7	11	20			5	3	11	25		24	27	**23**	25	310
17	Jared Fryar	29			1			2		1	2	3*			1		271
18	Landon S. Huffman	DNQ	18	25	11	15	33				12			13	2	**2***	258
19	Kaden Honeycutt	22			3		4		14	2	23			1			230
20	Buddy Isles Jr.	12	15	7	19	13	12	9	22								227
21	Ryan Millington	5	13	27	16	2	24				DNQ			24	26		204
22	Andrew Grady	17	25		13	19	13	22		17						17	193
23	Caden Kvapil	6				7	27		23		7					1	186
24	Jake Bollman	27	DNS	23	15	24	31				28	20			16		159
25	Ryan Wilson	DNQ		17	DNQ	23	35			14	Wth	28	22	11			153
26	Trevor Ward									**21**	21			9	21	6	136
27	Mason Diaz	24				**21**	23				19			5			121
28	Dale Earnhardt Jr.			21								10	18		12		108
29	Deac McCaskill	20	22								9			20			96
30	Mason Bailey		17		DNQ	22			21		DNS			25			88
31	Tyler Reif				**6**								21			14	87
32	Tate Fogleman	DNQ			27		8		26							27	85
33	Hudson Bulger			16		16								Wth	24		74
34	Dylon Wilson		10				19									26	71
35	Michael Bumgarner						26				16				13		71
36	Clay Jones	23	14		22												67
37	Thomas Beane										Wth	**16**			28	23	67
38	Matt Waltz							**3**					23				61
39	Brandon Lopez													21		5	58
40	Layne Riggs				4*		Wth				27						56
41	Dustin Storm						30	15	25								56
42	Bobby McCarty	2			30												53
43	Taylor Satterfield	DNQ		15								22					52
44	Alex Meggs						17									16	51
45	Riley Gentry						9					25					50
46	Graham Hollar										10				25		49
47	Ryley Music	16						21									47
48	Aaron Donnelly	DNQ	DNS						8								45
49	Carson Haislip	13	26														45
50	Camden Gullie	DNQ			24		21										44
51	Casey Kelley												**3**				42
52	Daniel Silvestri						36		7								41
53	Cody Kelley												4				38
54	Ryan Glenski												5				37
55	Matt Cox												9				35
56	Michael Hinde			8													34
57	Mitch Walker														8		34
58	Michael Fose	DNQ		13													33
59	Isaac Kitzmiller												DNS	14			33
60	Brandon Ward									10							32
61	Max Reaves	28								25							31
62	Holden Haddock		11														31
63	Jonathan Findley								11								31
64	Daniel Webster			12													30
65	Aiden King										DNQ				17		30
66	Jamey Caudill															13	29
67	Ryan Newman				14												28
68	Gary Greenwood											19			Wth		28
69	Matt Leicht														14		28
70	Dylan Ward									15							27
71	Helio Meza												15				27
72	Justin Carroll							16									26
73	Zack Wells									22	DNQ						25
74	Brody Monahan										17						25
75	Sam Butler						34				18						24
76	Brad Means														18		24
77	Cody Dempster			24			DNQ										23
78	William Meredith						Wth					24					23
79	Blayne Harrison										DNQ					24	23
80	Jacob Heafner												19				23
81	Conner Weddell								20								22
82	Terry Dease				21												21
83	Ryan Howard											21					21
84	Darrick Coomer															21	21
85	Austin Somero														22		20
86	Ralph Carnes											23					19
87	Austin Green					25											17
88	Jonathan Shafer						25										17
89	Bryce Applegate	26															16
90	Grant Davidson									26							16
91	Treyten Lapcevich										26						16
92	Jeremy Burns											26					16
93	Tyler Matthews												26				16
94	Kyle Dudley													26			16
95	Landon Pembelton								27								15
96	David Roberts											27					15
97	Corey LaJoie						28										14
98	Carson Kvapil						29										13
99	Jordan McGregor										29						13
100	Daniel Vuncannon		DNS														5
101	Cameron Bolin						DNQ										5
102	Daniel Wilk						DNQ										5
103	Tyler Gregory						DNQ										5
104	Charlie Watson										DNQ						5
105	Darren Krantz Jr.										DNQ						5
106	Chase Janes										DNQ						5
107	Kaeden Ballos										DNQ						5
108	Vicente Salas										DNQ						5
	Jordan Elias										Wth						
Pos	Driver	AAS	WCS	CDL	OCS	ACE	NWS	LGY	DOM	CRW	HCY	AND	FLC	SBO	TCM	NWS	Points

=== Pro Late Model Tour championship ===
(key) Bold – Pole position awarded by time. Italics – Pole position set by final practice results or rainout. * – Most laps led.

Pos	Driver	AAS	CDL	OCS	ACE	NWS	CRW	HCY	HCY	AND	FLC	SBO	TCM	NWS	Points
1	Ben Maier	4	19	7	**2**	9	**12**	5	11	**4**	6	**2**	**4**	4	474
2	Brandon Lopez	8	18	11	10	10	1	13	21	7	5	3	14	5	428
3	Dylan Garner	6	9	10	9	13	14	14	20	6	10	8	9	13	405
4	Keelan Harvick	Wth	**5***	6	7	3	11	**1****	17		**1**	1*		1	402
5	Isaac Kitzmiller	3	10	3		12	7		25	2	4	5	3	12	378
6	Rodney Dowless	7	22	9	4	18	9	8	26	11	11	16	15	17	374
7	Tyler Reif	5	25	15*			3			5	3	15		16	253
8	Tristan McKee	**2***	1			6	16		3	15		7		Wth	252
9	Jade Avedisian	1		2		17		4		10	7		Wth	11	247
10	Luke Baldwin			**1**		7			2	1*			13	**2***	243
11	T. J. DeCaire	DSQ	4		8	20			10			9	1	8	204
12	Conner Jones					8	10		14		2*	6		3	212
13	Brody Monahan	10	21	8	3	14									156
14	Trey Burke						8			8		12	10	18	154
15	Kaden Honeycutt			13		**1***		10	7						146
16	Seth Christensen		8				6		6	3					145
17	Taylor Hull		DNQ	12				16		17			6	20	144
18	Carson Ware		17		1*			9					11		135
19	Evan McKnight			4				6						6	110
20	Mason Walters						4					10	7		107
21	Jason Kitzmiller				5	22	15							21	105
22	Brody Gunter						2		23			13			88
23	Spencer Davis					4			**1***						86
24	Ashton Higgins									9			17	19	81
25	Caden Kvapil							2	4						78
26	Dawson Sutton					2			9						74
27	Toro Rodríguez					21			19	14					72
28	Cody Ware						5				12				69
29	Mia Lovell											11	8		66
30	T. J. Duke			14									5		65
31	Nick Loden							7	12						65
32	Logan Jones	9	27			27									63
33	Casey Roderick		20						5						59
34	Tim Sozio		12							13					59
35	Dusty Garus										13			14	59
36	Kevin Harvick							3						23	58
37	Case James										9		18		57
38	Jace Hale							11	16	Wth					57
39	Joshua Horniman	12				16									56
40	Vito Cancilla					15							12		56
41	Mason Diaz							15	13						56
42	Hudson Bulger		6			25									53
43	Dylan Cappello					Wth		12	27						50
44	Colin Allman		2												42
45	Bayley Currey												2		41
46	Jett Noland		3												39
47	Harrison Burton											4			38
48	Jarrett Butcher			5											37
49	Josh Berry					5									37
50	Adrián Ferrer				6										36
51	Luke Yarbrough		7												35
52	Katie Hettinger								8						35
53	Aidan Potter													7	35
54	Chase Burgeson										8				34
55	Jake Johnson													9	34
56	Treyten Lapcevich													10	32
57	Camden Murphy					11									32
58	Garrett Hill	11													31
59	Cody Martell		11												31
60	Patrick Hodges		13												30
61	Hudson Canipe									12					30
62	Mason Maggio	13													29
63	Darren Krantz Jr.						13								29
64	Cody Haskins		14												28
65	Colton Ingerick											14			28
66	Hunter Johnson		15												27
67	Justin Crider								15						27
68	Terri Crider													15	27
69	Spencer Bragg		16												26
70	Tristan Pena									16					26
71	Tyler Church												16		26
72	Sheflon Clay							17	Wth						25
73	Jeff Batten								18						24
74	Brandan Marhefka					19									23
75	Matt Gould												19		23
76	Cameron Clifford								22						20
77	Taylor Mayhew													22	20
78	Gage Gilby		23												19
79	Nick Neri					23									19
80	Augie Grill		24												18
81	Max Reaves					24									18
82	Austin MacDonald								24						18
83	Garrett Gumm		26												16
84	Kevin Cremonesi					26									16
85	Stuart Dutton		28												14
86	Cody Brinson					28									14
87	Jaxon Bishop		29												13
88	Brandon Brilliant		30												12
89	Carter Whalen		DNQ												5
90	Rafe Slate		DNQ												5
91	Darren Shaw												Wth		5
Pos	Driver	AAS	CDL	OCS	ACE	NWS	CRW	HCY	HCY	AND	FLC	SBO	TCM	NWS	Points

== See also ==
- 2025 NASCAR Cup Series
- 2025 NASCAR Xfinity Series
- 2025 NASCAR Craftsman Truck Series
- 2025 ARCA Menards Series
- 2025 ARCA Menards Series East
- 2025 ARCA Menards Series West
- 2025 NASCAR Whelen Modified Tour
- 2025 NASCAR Canada Series
- 2025 NASCAR Mexico Series
- 2025 NASCAR Euro Series
- 2025 NASCAR Brasil Series
- 2025 SMART Modified Tour
- 2025 ASA STARS National Tour
