= Dylon Wilson =

American racing driver (born 1996)

- Born: February 17, 1996 (age 30) Taylorsville, North Carolina, U.S.

CARS Late Model Stock Tour career
- Debut season: 2015
- Years active: 2015, 2018–2018, 2022–present
- Starts: 25
- Championships: 0
- Wins: 0
- Poles: 0
- Best finish: 18th in 2023
- Statistics up to date as of October 19, 2025.

Dylon Wilson (born February 17, 1996) is an American professional stock car racing driver. He last competed in the zMAX CARS Tour, driving the No. 4 for Wilson Racing Corp.

Wilson is the grandson of former NASCAR driver Dean Combs.

Wilson has also competed in the Paramount Kia Big 10 Challenge and the Southeast Limited Late Model Series.

== Motorsports results ==
=== CARS Late Model Stock Car Tour ===
(key) (Bold – Pole position awarded by qualifying time. Italics – Pole position earned by points standings or practice time. * – Most laps led. ** – All laps led.)

CARS Late Model Stock Car Tour results
Year	Team	No.	Make	1	2	3	4	5	6	7	8	9	10	11	12	13	14	15	16	17	CLMSCTC	Pts	Ref
2015	Tammy Wilson	1W	Chevy	SNM	ROU	HCY; 22	SNM	TCM	MMS	ROU	CON	MYB	HCY								53rd	11	
2018	Eric Wilson	77D	N/A	TCM	MYB	ROU	HCY	BRI	ACE	CCS	KPT	HCY; 12									33rd	36	
2018	Eric Wilson	4	Chevy										WKS; 18	ROU	SBO						33rd	36	
2019	Wilson Racing	4W	Chevy	SNM	HCY; 25	ROU	ACE	MMS	LGY	DOM	CCS	HCY	ROU	SBO							64th	8	
2022	Wilson Racing	77W	Chevy	CRW	HCY	GRE	AAS	FCS	LGY	DOM	HCY; 12	ACE	MMS								36th	56	
2022	Wilson Racing	4W	Chevy											NWS; 19	TCM; 12	ACE	SBO	CRW			36th	56	
2023	Wilson Racing	4	Chevy	SNM; 23	FLC; 18	HCY; 18	ACE; DNQ	NWS; 26	LGY; 24	DOM; 21	CRW	HCY; 28	ACE; 21	TCM; 13	WKS; 14	AAS; 17	SBO; 22	TCM; 21	CRW; 18		18th	180	
2024	Wilson Racing	4	Chevy	SNM	HCY	AAS	OCS	ACE	TCM	LGY	DOM	CRW	HCY	NWS; 31	ACE	WCS	FLC	SBO	TCM	NWS; 13	N/A	0	
2025	MKM Racing Development	32	Chevy	AAS	WCS; 10	CDL	OCS	ACE	NWS; 19	LGY	DOM	CRW	HCY	AND	FLC	SBO	TCM	NWS; 26			34th	71	
