= Michael Bumgarner (racing driver) =

American racing driver (born 2003)

- Born: July 8, 2003 (age 23) Taylorsville, North Carolina, U.S.

CARS Late Model Stock Tour career
- Debut season: 2021
- Years active: 2021, 2025–present
- Starts: 7
- Championships: 0
- Wins: 0
- Poles: 0
- Best finish: 35th in 2025
- Statistics up to date as of August 9, 2026.

Michael Bumgarner (born July 8, 2003) is an American professional stock car racing driver. He currently competes in the zMAX CARS Tour, driving the No. 51 Chevrolet for Rick Ware Racing.

In 2026, Bumgarner was announced as a finalist for the Kulwicki Driver Development Program.

Bumgarner has also competed in the Virginia Late Model Triple Crown Series, the Paramount Kia Big 10 Challenge, the All-Pro Limited Late Model Series, and the NASCAR Weekly Series, and is a former track champion at Hickory Motor Speedway.

== Motorsports results ==
=== CARS Late Model Stock Car Tour ===
(key) (Bold – Pole position awarded by qualifying time. Italics – Pole position earned by points standings or practice time. * – Most laps led. ** – All laps led.)

CARS Late Model Stock Car Tour results
| Year | Team | No. | Make | 1 | 2 | 3 | 4 | 5 | 6 | 7 | 8 | 9 | 10 | 11 | 12 | 13 | 14 | 15 | CLMSCTC | Pts | Ref |
|---|---|---|---|---|---|---|---|---|---|---|---|---|---|---|---|---|---|---|---|---|---|
| 2021 | David Gilliland Racing | 54B | Ford | DIL | HCY | OCS | ACE | CRW | LGY | DOM | HCY | MMS | TCM | FLC; 20 | WKS | SBO | | | 59th | 13 | |
| 2025 | Michael Bumgarner Racing | 97 | Chevy | AAS | WCS | CDL | OCS | ACE | NWS; 26 | LGY | DOM | CRW | | | | | | | 35th | 71 | |
| 2025 | Michael Bumgarner Racing | 95 | Chevy | | | | | | | | | | HCY; 16 | AND | FLC | SBO | | | 35th | 71 | |
| 2025 | Levitt Marlowe Racing | 07 | N/A | | | | | | | | | | | | | | TCM; 13 | NWS | 35th | 71 | |
| 2026 | Rick Ware Racing | 51 | Chevy | SNM | WCS | NSV | CRW; 15 | ACE | LGY | DOM | | HCY; 11 | AND | FLC | TCM | NPS | SBO | | 44th | 67 | |
| 2026 | Rick Ware Racing | 51B | Chevy | | | | | | | | NWS; 33 | | | | | | | | 44th | 67 | |

=== IHRA Late Model Sportsman Series ===
(key) (Bold – Pole position awarded by qualifying time. Italics – Pole position earned by points standings or practice time. * – Most laps led. ** – All laps led.)

IHRA Late Model Sportsman Series
| Year | Team | No. | Make | 1 | 2 | 3 | ISCSS | Pts | Ref |
|---|---|---|---|---|---|---|---|---|---|
| 2026 | Michael Bumgarner Racing | 97 | Chevy | DUB; 36 | CDL | AND | N/A | 0 | |
