= Carson Haislip =

American racing driver (born 2008/09)

- Born: 2008 or 2009 (age 17–18) Raleigh, North Carolina, U.S.

CARS Late Model Stock Tour career
- Debut season: 2024
- Years active: 2024–present
- Starts: 5
- Championships: 0
- Wins: 0
- Poles: 0
- Best finish: 49th in 2025
- Statistics up to date as of March 30, 2026.

Carson Haislip is an American professional stock car racing driver. He currently competes in the zMAX CARS Tour, driving the No. 08 for his own team, Carson Haislip Racing.

In 2026, Haislip was announced as a finalist for the Kulwicki Driver Development Program.

Haislip has also competed in series such as the INEX Summer Shootout, where he won the championship in the Young Lions division in 2022, the INEX Winter Nationnals, where he won the championship in the Semi-Pro division in 2023, the Southeast Legends Tour, and the NASCAR Weekly Series, and is a former track champion at Wake County Speedway.

== Motorsports results ==
=== CARS Late Model Stock Car Tour ===
(key) (Bold – Pole position awarded by qualifying time. Italics – Pole position earned by points standings or practice time. * – Most laps led. ** – All laps led.)

CARS Late Model Stock Car Tour results
Year	Team	No.	Make	1	2	3	4	5	6	7	8	9	10	11	12	13	14	15	16	17	CLMSCTC	Pts	Ref
2024	Carson Haislip Racing	08H	Chevy	SNM	HCY	AAS	OCS	ACE	TCM	LGY	DOM	CRW	HCY	NWS	ACE	WCS; 7	FLC	SBO; 17	TCM	NWS	N/A	0	
2025	Carson Haislip Racing	08H	Chevy	AAS; 13	WCS; 26	CDL	OCS	ACE	NWS	LGY	DOM	CRW	HCY	AND	FLC	SBO	TCM	NWS			49th	45	
2026	Carson Haislip Racing	08	Chevy	SNM	WCS; 23	NSV	CRW	ACE	LGY	DOM	NWS	HCY	AND	FLC	TCM	NPS	SBO				81st	21	

=== SMART Modified Tour ===
SMART Modified Tour results
Year	Car owner	No.	Make	1	2	3	4	5	6	7	8	9	10	11	12	13	SMTC	Pts	Ref
2026	Sadler-Stanley Racing	16VA	N/A	FLO	AND	SBO	DOM	HCY	WKS; 12	FCR	CRW	PUL	CAR	ROU	TRI; 14	NWS; 13	29th	84	
