= Clay Jones (racing driver) =

American racing driver

- Born: February 18, 1987 (age 39) Goldsboro, North Carolina, U.S.

CARS Late Model Stock Tour career
- Debut season: 2023
- Years active: 2023–present
- Starts: 9
- Championships: 0
- Wins: 0
- Poles: 1
- Best finish: 36th in 2025

Awards
- 2022 North Carolina NASCAR Weekly Series Champion; Six-time Wake County Speedway Champion
- Statistics up to date as of March 30, 2026.

Clay Jones (born February 18, 1987) is an American professional stock car racing driver. He currently competes in the zMAX CARS Tour, driving the No. 1J Chevrolet for Markham Enterprises.

Jones has also competed in the series such as the ASA CRA Super Series, the PASS South Super Late Model Series, the Virginia Late Model Triple Crown Series, and the NASCAR Weekly Series, and is a former track champion at Wake County Speedway.

== Motorsports results ==
=== CARS Late Model Stock Car Tour ===
(key) (Bold – Pole position awarded by qualifying time. Italics – Pole position earned by points standings or practice time. * – Most laps led. ** – All laps led.)

CARS Late Model Stock Car Tour results
Year	Team	No.	Make	1	2	3	4	5	6	7	8	9	10	11	12	13	14	15	16	17	CLMSCTC	Pts	Ref
2023	Markham Enterprises	1J	Chevy	SNM	FLC	HCY	ACE	NWS	LGY	DOM	CRW	HCY	ACE	TCM	**WKS**; 9	AAS	SBO	TCM	CRW		40th	27	
2024	Markham Enterprises	1J	Chevy	SNM; 8	HCY	AAS	OCS; 17	ACE	TCM	LGY	DOM	CRW	HCY	NWS	ACE	WCS; 12	FLC	SBO	TCM	NWS	N/A	0	
2025	Markham Enterprises	1J	Chevy	AAS; 23	WCS; 14	CDL	OCS; 22	ACE	NWS	LGY	DOM	CRW	HCY	AND	FLC	SBO	TCM	NWS			36th	67	
2026	Markham Enterprises	1J	Chevy	SNM; 7	WCS; 9	NSV	CRW	ACE	LGY	DOM	NWS	HCY	AND	FLC	TCM	NPS	SBO				42nd	69	

=== CARS Super Late Model Tour ===
(key)

CARS Super Late Model Tour results
Year	Team	No.	Make	1	2	3	4	5	6	7	8	9	10	CSLMTC	Pts	Ref
2015	Curtis Venable	67	Ford	SNM; 9	ROU; 19	HCY; 22	SNM; 4	TCM; 8	MMS; 4	ROU; 13	CON; 17	MYB; 10	HCY; 4	5th	220	
2016	Curtis Venable	67	Ford	SNM; 20	ROU; 15	HCY; 8	TCM; 18	GRE	ROU; 14	CON	MYB; 9	HCY	SNM; 8	11th	139	
