= Hudson Bulger =

American racing driver

- Born: October 6, 2007 (age 19) Perry, Georgia, U.S.

CARS Late Model Stock Tour career
- Debut season: 2025
- Years active: 2025–present
- Starts: 3
- Championships: 0
- Wins: 0
- Poles: 0
- Best finish: 33rd in 2025
- Statistics up to date as of October 30, 2025.

Hudson Bulger (born October 6, 2007) is an American professional stock car racing driver. He last competed in the zMAX CARS Tour, driving the No. 12 for KP Speed Motorsports.

In 2026, it was revealed that Bulger would participate in the pre-season test for the ARCA Menards Series at Daytona International Speedway, driving for Fast Track Racing as a part on the Road to Daytona program, where he set the 45th quickest time between the two sessions held.

Bulger has also competed in series such as the CRA JEGS All-Stars Tour, the Show Me The Money Pro Late Model Series, the Thursday Thunder Legends Racing Series, and the NASCAR Weekly Series,

== Motorsports results ==
=== Stock car career summary ===
Season	Series	Team	Races	Wins	Top 5	Top 10	Points	Position
2024	CARS Pro Late Model Tour	Hudson Bulger Racing	5	0	0	1	95	21st
2025	CARS Pro Late Model Tour	Hudson Bulger Racing	2	0	0	1	53	42nd
2025	CARS Late Model Stock Car Tour	KP Speed Motorsports	3	0	0	0	74	33rd
2026	ASA STARS National Tour	Tom Bulger	3	0	0	0		

=== CARS Late Model Stock Car Tour ===
(key) (Bold – Pole position awarded by qualifying time. Italics – Pole position earned by points standings or practice time. * – Most laps led. ** – All laps led.)

CARS Late Model Stock Car Tour results
Year	Team	No.	Make	1	2	3	4	5	6	7	8	9	10	11	12	13	14	15	CLMSCTC	Pts	Ref
2025	KP Speed Motorsports	12	N/A	AAS	WCS	CDL; 16	OCS	ACE; 16	NWS	LGY	DOM	CRW	HCY	AND	FLC				33rd	74	
2025	KP Speed Motorsports	12B	N/A													SBO; Wth	TCM; 24	NWS	33rd	74	

=== CARS Pro Late Model Tour ===
(key)

CARS Pro Late Model Tour results
Year	Team	No.	Make	1	2	3	4	5	6	7	8	9	10	11	12	13	CPLMTC	Pts	Ref
2024	Hudson Bulger Racing	17	N/A	SNM; 18	HCY; 21	OCS	ACE	TCM	CRW		NWS; 12	ACE	FLC	SBO	TCM	NWS; 7	21st	95	
2024	Hudson Bulger Racing	6H	N/A							HCY; 11							21st	95	
2025	Hudson Bulger Racing	17	N/A	AAS	CDL; 6	OCS	ACE	NWS; 25	CRW	HCY	HCY	AND	FLC	SBO	TCM	NWS	42nd	53	

=== ASA STARS National Tour ===
(key) (Bold – Pole position awarded by qualifying time. Italics – Pole position earned by points standings or practice time. * – Most laps led. ** – All laps led.)

ASA STARS National Tour results
Year	Team	No.	Make	1	2	3	4	5	6	7	8	9	10	11	ASNTC	Pts	Ref
2026	Tom Bulger	17	Ford	NSM; 25	FIF; 12	HCY	SLG	MAD	NPS	OWO	TRI	WIN	NSV	NSM; 17	-*	-*	
