= T. J. DeCaire =

American racing driver

- Born: October 14, 2006 (age 20) Land O'Lakes, Florida, U.S.

CARS Pro Late Model Tour career
- Debut season: 2023
- Years active: 2023–present
- Starts: 31
- Championships: 0
- Wins: 2
- Poles: 2
- Best finish: 6th in 2024
- Statistics up to date as of October 18, 2026.

T. J. DeCaire (born October 14, 2006) is an American professional stock car racing driver. He currently competes in the zMAX CARS Tour, driving the No. 1/7 Chevrolet for LowCountry Motorsports. He is a former development driver for Rev Racing.

DeCaire has also competed in series such as the Carolina Pro Late Model Series, the CRA JEGS All-Stars Tour, the World Series of Asphalt Stock Car Racing, and the NASCAR Weekly Series.

== Motorsports results ==
=== CARS Pro Late Model Tour ===
(key)

CARS Pro Late Model Tour results
Year	Team	No.	Make	1	2	3	4	5	6	7	8	9	10	11	12	13	CPLMTC	Pts	Ref
2023	N/A	88	Chevy	SNM	HCY	ACE; 4	NWS; 26	TCM	DIL; 3	CRW	WKS	HCY; 5	TCM	SBO	TCM	CRW	20th	95	
2024	Highlands Motorsports	96	Chevy	SNM; 11	HCY; 7	OCS; 6	ACE; 9	TCM; 2	CRW; 5	HCY; 7	NWS; 17	ACE; 7	FLC				6th	314	
2024	Walker Motorsports	15	N/A											SBO; 5	TCM; 6	NWS; 2	6th	314	
2025	Walker Motorsports	54	N/A	AAS; DSQ	CDL; 4	OCS		NWS; 20	CRW	HCY	HCY; 10	AND	FLC				11th	204	
2025	Bryson Lopez Racing	47	Chevy				ACE; 8								TCM; 1		11th	204	
2025	Walker Motorsports	15	N/A											SBO; 9			11th	204	
2025	N/A	88	N/A													NWS; 8	11th	204	
2026	LowCountry Motorsports	7	Chevy	SNM	NSV	CRW	ACE	NWS; 2									10th	281	
2026	LowCountry Motorsports	1	Chevy						HCY; 1**	AND; 3	FLC; 4	TCM; 3*	NPS; 5	SBO; 5			10th	281	
