= R&S Race Cars =

American car racing team

- Owner(s): Marcus Richmond, Steve Stallings
- Opened: 2019
- Website: https://randsracecars.com/

Career
- Race victories: Ace Speedway
- Pole positions: Ace Speedway

R&S Race Cars is a CARS Tour Series and Advance Auto Parts Weekly Series team that was founded in 2019 after the acquisition of A&E Race Cars. The team was founded by Marcus Richmond and Steve Stallings, who still manage the team to this day. Located in South Boston, Virginia, the team fields its own cars which are the No. 4 Ford Mustang Late model driven by Kade Brown in the CARS Tour Series and the No. 0 and the No. 77 in the Advance Auto Parts Weekly Series at South Boston Speedway.

== Cars Tour Team History ==
After the team was founded in 2019, the following year, they had their inaugural season in 2020. The team raced the number 19 with a variety of drivers racing, including large names like NASCAR Cup Series driver Ty Gibbs, who nearly brought home a win at Greenville-Pickens Speedway in their first season. In 2022, Jonathan Shafer drove full-time for R&S, bringing home the team's first win in the CARS Tour Series at Ace Speedway, driving the No. 91 along with NASCAR Craftsman Truck Series driver Conner Jones, who brought home a win by driving a car built by R&S for a client. Towards the end of the year, on October 13, it was announced that Jonathan Shafer would run select races for R&S in 2023 along with his full-time NASCAR Craftsman Truck Series schedule. On October 19, the team stated that Shafer would not be returning to the team next year, and the team announced they would be looking for another driver for 2023. In November, it was announced that three-time champion Bobby McCarty would drive the No. 6 for R&S in 2023, and it was also announced that same month that Logan Clark would drive the No. 15 for R&S Race Cars. At the end of the year in 2024, it was announced that Clark and Bobby McCarty would be staying with the team for 2024, full-time, on the team in the CARS Tour Series. In 2024, it was announced that Kade Brown would be racing select races of the remaining season. Brown would end up staying with R&S for 2025 as well as being their lead driver for the No. 4 and the No. 19.

On January 27, 2026, it was announced that the team will switch manufacturers to Dodge, with Landon Pembelton running at South Boston Speedway and the Virginia Triple Crown, Sam Butler running full-time in the CARS Late Model Stock Tour, and Trey Crews running the Virginia Triple Crown.
