= 2024 CARS Tour =

28th season of the CARS Tour

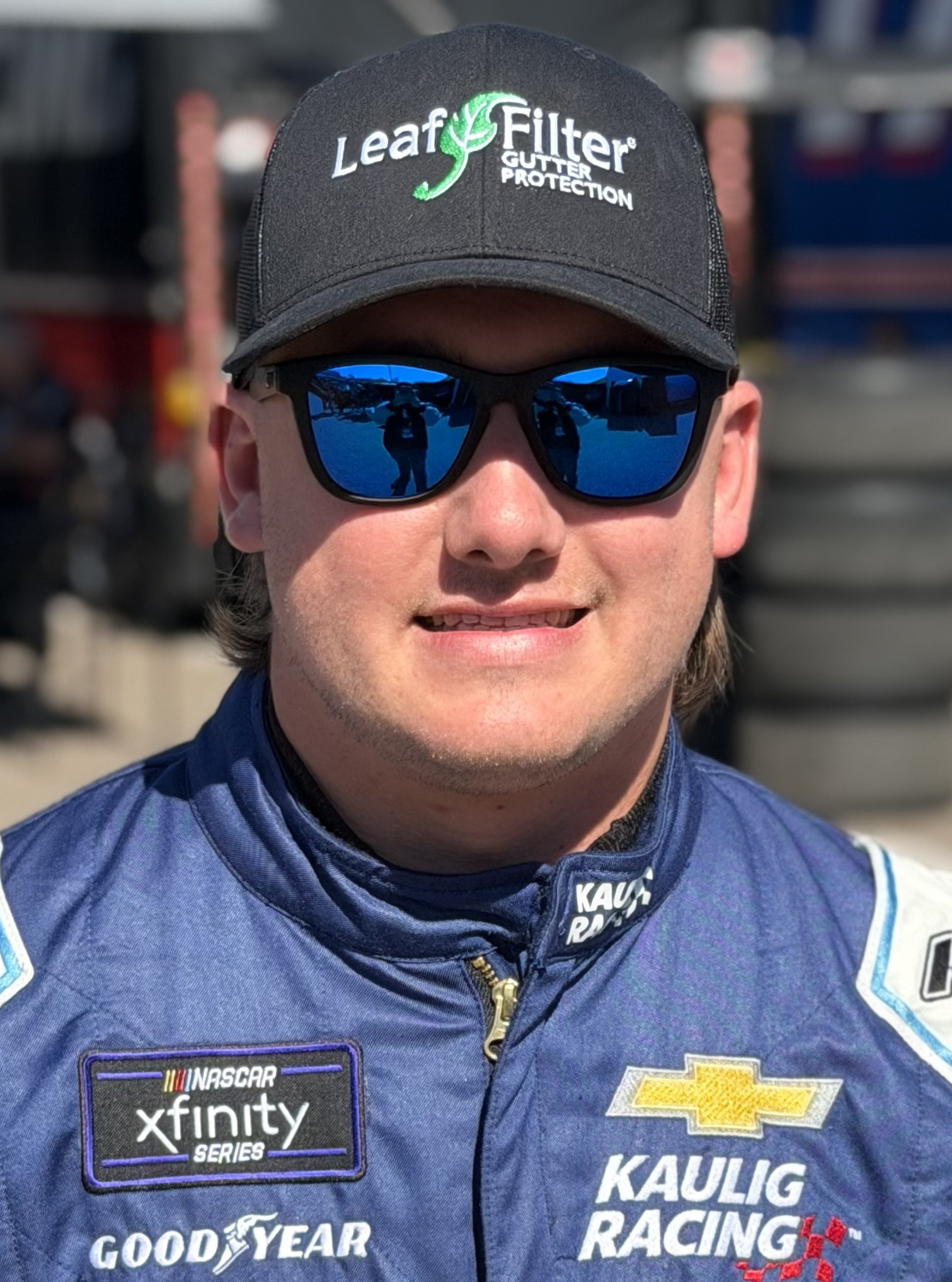
Brenden Queen, the 2024 Late Model Stock Tour champion.

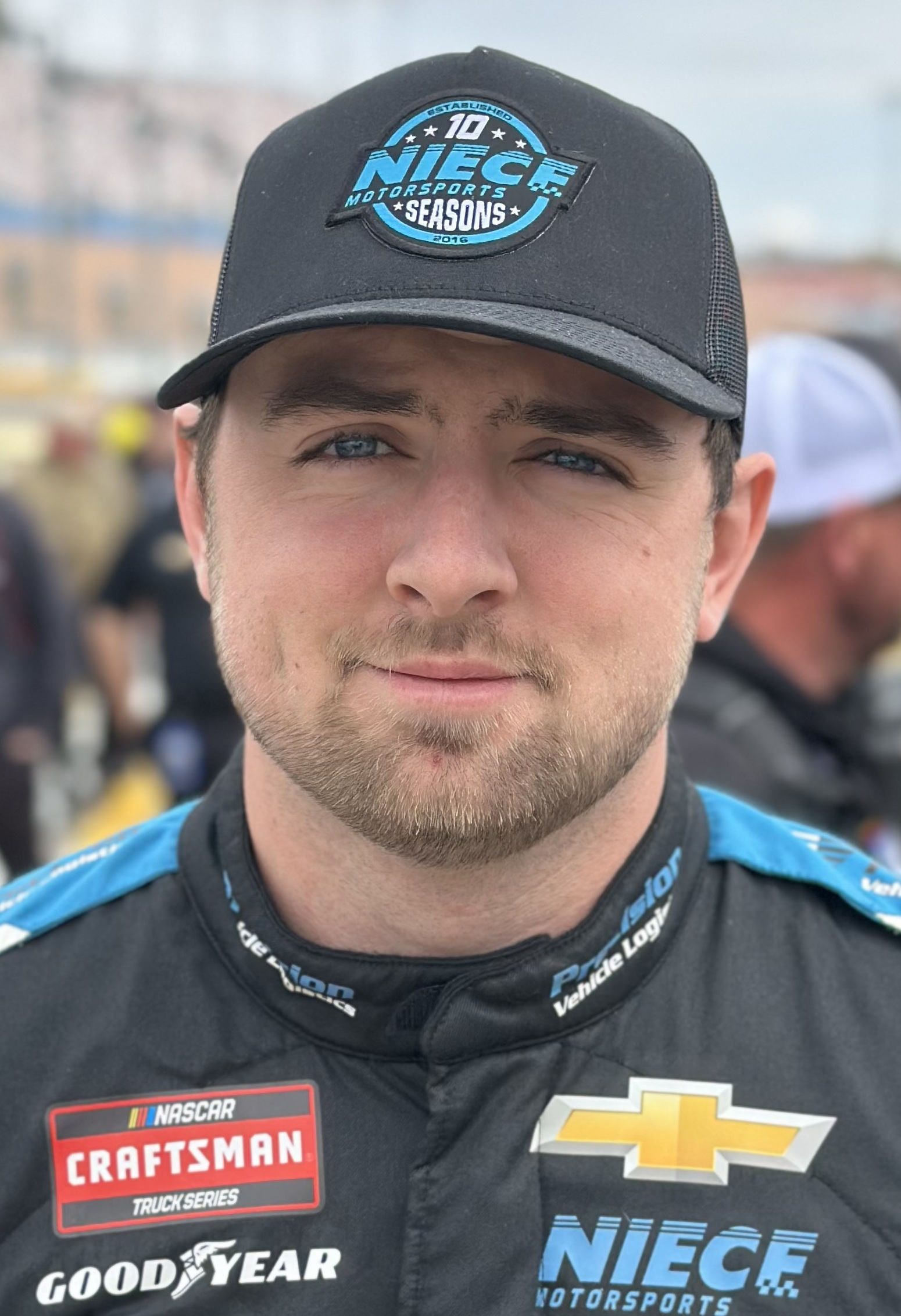
Kaden Honeycutt, the 2024 Pro Late Model Tour champion.

The 2024 CARS Tour was the 28th season of the zMAX CARS Tour, a stock car racing series. It began at Southern National Motorsports Park on March 2 and ended at North Wilkesboro Speedway on October 19. Brenden Queen won the Late Model Stock Tour championship, while Kaden Honeycutt won the Pro Late Model Tour championship.

Carson Kvapil entered the season as the defending Late Model Stock Tour champion, while younger brother Caden Kvapil entered as the Pro Late Model Tour champion.

== Schedule & results ==
Date	Track	Location	LMSC Winner	PLM Winner
March 2-9	Southern National Motorsports Park	Lucama, North Carolina	Carson Kvapil (3/9)	Kyle Campbell (3/2)
April 6	Hickory Motor Speedway	Hickory, North Carolina	Connor Zilisch	Kyle Campbell
April 13 (Note: Race was postponed from March 23 due to weather)	New River All-American Speedway	Jacksonville, North Carolina	Bobby McCarty	N/A
April 20	Orange County Speedway	Rougemont, North Carolina	Brent Crews	Kaden Honeycutt
May 3	Ace Speedway	Altamahaw, North Carolina	Carson Kvapil (2)	Caden Kvapil
May 25	Tri-County Speedway	Granite Falls, North Carolina	Brenden Queen	Jake Bollman
June 1	Langley Speedway	Hampton, Virginia	Connor Hall	N/A
June 15	Dominion Raceway	Thornburg, Virginia	Brenden Queen (2)	N/A
July 3	Caraway Speedway	Asheboro, North Carolina	Brent Crews (2)	Tristan McKee
July 27	Hickory Motor Speedway	Hickory, North Carolina	Ronnie Bassett Jr.	Jimmy Renfrew Jr.
August 3 (Note: Races postponed from May 14-15 because of weather)	North Wilkesboro Speedway	North Wilkesboro, North Carolina	Treyten Lapcevich	Tristan McKee (2)
August 16 (Note: Race postponed from August 9 because of weather.)	Ace Speedway	Altamahaw, North Carolina	Brent Crews (3)	Caden Kvapil (2)
August 24	Wake County Speedway	Raleigh, North Carolina	Landen Lewis	N/A
August 30	Florence Motor Speedway	Timmonsville, South Carolina	Ryan Millington	Spencer Davis
September 14	South Boston Speedway	South Boston, Virginia	Carson Kvapil (3)	Spencer Davis (2)
October 12	Tri-County Speedway	Granite Falls, North Carolina	Conner Jones	Kaden Honeycutt (2)
October 19	North Wilkesboro Speedway	North Wilkesboro, North Carolina	Conner Jones (2)	Kaden Honeycutt (3)

== Standings ==
=== Late Model Stock Car championship ===
(key) Bold – Pole position awarded by time. Italics – Pole position set by final practice results or rainout. * – Most laps led.

Pos	Driver	SNM	HCY	AAS	OCS	ACE	TCM	LGY	DOM	CRW	HCY	NWS	ACE	WCS	FLC	SBO	TCM	NWS	Points
1	Brenden Queen	19	2	**11**	13	2	**1****	14	**1****	23	5	**5***	4	3	2	5	3	5	466
2	Connor Hall	2	4	3	4	12	19	1	2	3	**3**	18	5	11	**4**	7	13	4	457
3	Mini Tyrrell	7	5	2	18	9	10	13	5	22	7	3	2	4	6*	6	15	3	428
4	Ryan Millington	22	8	7	7	**3***	17	6	6	10	14	9	14*	5	1	**3***	16	9	418
5	Brent Crews	6*	9	16	1	15	7	**2***	9	1	19	10	1	14*	21	15	25	11	396
6	Treyten Lapcevich	9	10	4	10	7	18	5	3	11	6	1	9	2	11	2	12	21	388
7	Carson Kvapil	1		5	3	1	22	3	7	5*	17	4				1	6	**2***	366
8	Bobby McCarty	10	6	1	**24***	4	20	8	21	16	2		**18**		12	10			287
9	Ronnie Bassett Jr.	15	18	25	26	6	28	11	DNQ	9	1	8	16		15	20	20	16	265
10	Brandon Pierce	16	14	19	20	11	27	21	13	18	22	19	13	13	24	18	19	10	264
11	Conner Jones		26				8	15	4	12	25	14	10		8	19	1	1	261
12	Kade Brown	25	7	12	25	21	5	19	29	25	4	29	12	8	13	12	29		254
13	Buddy Isles Jr.	12	19	17	19	23	12	24	23		21	24	7	16	26	9	14	26	236
14	Andrew Grady	27	25	9	12	19	4	12	10	13	23				25	14	9	25	235
15	Jacob Heafner	18	12	18	11	10	16	17	16	14	12	28			9				215
16	Chad McCumbee	**26**	3*	6	22	5	9	7	25	17			6		27				215
17	Landen Lewis		**13**	8		18	29	22	8				12	1	14	16			196
18	Deac McCaskill	3	23	23	16	16	3	9	28	15	26			19			24		189
19	Isabella Robusto			10	27	8	15		15		16		8	15	29	23		12	185
20	Chase Burrow	4			5		2		26			16			18	25	5	19	177
21	Katie Hettinger	14	20	21	6	14	21	20	20	20	10								164
22	Landon Huffman	DNQ	15	24*	29	17	25				11	13		9				15	143
23	Bryce Applegate	21	17	15	23	25	6	10	22	19									139
24	Connor Zilisch		1		15		13			7	8	15							139
25	Kaden Honeycutt	5			2		14					25					23	8	121
26	Mason Diaz	30	24			20			27		20	7			5				
27	Cody Dempster	DNQ	11	13				23			15					24	11		
28	Layne Riggs	11			8					6		22				4			
29	Logan Clark	13	21	22	30				17										
30	Cameron Bolin	23	28				26					30							
31	Dylan Ward					22				8			21				28		
32	Landon S. Huffman														28	11	4	27	
33	Brandon Jones					13					13	23							
34	Clay Jones	8			17									12					
35	Connor Mosack				21							27						6	
36	Corey Heim									24		2					**18***		
37	Mason Bailey				28				19					**6**					
38	Parker Eatmon															21	27	18	
39	Peyton Sellers								24							8		22	
40	Ryan Wilson														19		7	17	
41	Aaron Donnelly															13	17	DNS	
42	Blayne Harrison						24										26		
43	Caden Kvapil												3	17					
44	Carson Haislip													7		17			
45	Dale Earnhardt Jr.			14											10				
46	Dillon Harville					24							15						
47	Dylon Wilson											31						13	
48	Gavan Boschele	20						16											
49	Gio Ruggiero		29									6							
50	Heath Causey									26			19						
51	Jared Fryar									**4**							2		
52	Jason Kitzmiller								14	21									
53	Jonathan Findley	DNQ	22						18										
54	Landon Pembelton								11			12							
55	Michael Fose										18				23				
56	Trevor Ward	28																23	
57	Tristan McKee											20						7	
58	Andrew Patterson																30		
59	Blake Stallings												17						
60	Brody Monahan																22		
61	Camden Gullie				14														
62	Casey Kelley														22				
63	Casey Pierce																	14	
64	Charlie Watson																8		
65	Cody Kelley														17				
66	Daniel Vuncannon													18					
67	Daniel Wilk											17							
68	Davey Callihan								12										
69	Dean Ward												20						
70	Dexter Canipe Jr.						11												
71	Donovan Strauss														16				
72	Dustin Storm								30										
73	Graham Hollar										24								
74	Holden Haddock													10					
75	Jake Bollman																	20	
76	Jamey Caudill	24																	
77	John Goin	17																	
78	Josh Berry										9								
79	Josh Kossek		16																
80	Justin Hicks											32							
81	Kevin Harvick											11							
82	Landon Rapp															22			
83	Matt Cox														3				
84	Max Reaves																10		
85	Paul Williamson			20															
86	Rajah Caruth														20				
87	Ryan Glenski														7				
88	Ryan Joyner	29																	
89	Sam Butler		27																
90	Tate Fogleman								DNQ			21							
91	Timothy Peters				9														
92	Tommy Joe Martins						23												
93	Travis Baity																	24	
94	Tyler Gregory											33							
95	William Byron									2									
96	Taylor Satterfield		DNS																
Pos	Driver	SNM	HCY	AAS	OCS	ACE	TCM	LGY	DOM	CRW	HCY	NWS	ACE	WCS	FLC	SBO	TCM	NWS	Points

=== Pro Late Model Tour championship ===
(key) Bold – Pole position awarded by time. Italics – Pole position set by final practice results or rainout. * – Most laps led.

Pos	Driver	SNM	HCY	OCS	ACE	TCM	CRW	HCY	NWS	ACE	FLC	SBO	TCM	NWS	Points
1	Kaden Honeycutt	3	9	1**	3	5	7	8	8	**2**	3	4	1	1*	386
2	Spencer Davis	6	2	3	2	3	6	12	3	4	1	**1**	4	14	376
3	Caden Kvapil	5	14	10	**1****	14	3	4	7	1	14	3	3	11	350
4	Jimmy Renfrew Jr.	2	6	15	10	4	4	1	10	5	11	8	5	4	346
5	Tristan McKee	4	24	9	7	15	**1****	15	1*	12*	**4**	2*	**16***	15	323
6	T. J. DeCaire	11	7	6	9	2	5	7	17	7		5	6	**2**	314
7	Jake Bollman	19	17	8	11	1*	8	5	9	3	2*	9			282
8	Dylan Garner	16	13	18	12	11	17	14	21		9	14	9	9	232
9	Joshua Horniman	24	16	19	20	12	15	19	22	11	10	10	14	10	227
10	Brandon Lopez	21	15	13	21	10	13		19	8	13	7	11	22	223
11	Kyle Campbell	1	**1***	16	6	7	12					13	7		210
12	Conner Jones		4	**4**	5		2	2*	6						180
13	Nick Loden	14	3	2	15	**16**		18	25		12	15			179
14	Max Reaves		22	7	14		14			6			12	5	151
15	Ashton Higgins	25	20	12	13	13	10		27				2		144
16	Logan Jones	20	28		17	9			15	10		16		23	126
17	Tyler Church	23	11			8			14		6		15		121
18	Travis Braden									9	15	6	10	6	119
19	Cameron Bolin										5	11	8	3	105
20	Jonathan Shafer					6	9	3	16						98
21	Hudson Bulger	18	21					11	12					7	95
22	Katie Hettinger	7	5	11	16										93
23	Justin Crider	15	12	14					20				13		90
24	Aiden King	8	8					13							70
25	Luke Baldwin			5	18				26	14					69
26	Tyler Tanner	**26**	23	17										8	
27	Dusty Garus										8		19	13	
28	Jessica Cann	22		20						13					
29	Amber Lynn						16					12			
30	Cameron Clifford							9					17		
31	George Phillips							6	11						
32	Jeff Batten	28	27												
33	Kris Wright	9*	26												
34	Lanie Buice												20	20	
35	Max Cookson	12	25												
36	Tim Sozio						11							19	
37	Adam Murray	27													
38	Austin Jones								23						
39	Blaise Rutherford								24						
40	Brett Suggs							10							
41	Casey Roderick								18						
42	Chase Pinsonneault	13													
43	Corey Heim								2						
44	Daniel Webster													21	
45	Dustin Bryson		19												
46	Dylan Fetcho								4						
47	Edward Cheslak													17	
48	Gio Ruggiero													16	
49	Holden Haddock	17													
50	Jaydn Daniels												18		
51	Kevin Harvick										7				
52	Kyle Steckly		10												
53	Mason Lastra				19										
54	Matt Craig								5						
55	Michael Toner							17							
56	Mike Hopkins	10													
57	Nathan Gregg													24	
58	Ryan Moore				8										
59	Seth Christensen													13	
60	Tate Fogleman													18	
61	Terri Crider													12	
62	Tyler Johnson							16							
63	William Hale		18												
64	William Sawalich				4										
Pos	Driver	SNM	HCY	OCS	ACE	TCM	CRW	HCY	NWS	ACE	FLC	SBO	TCM	NWS	Points

== See also ==
- 2024 NASCAR Cup Series
- 2024 NASCAR Xfinity Series
- 2024 NASCAR Craftsman Truck Series
- 2024 ARCA Menards Series
- 2024 ARCA Menards Series East
- 2024 ARCA Menards Series West
- 2024 NASCAR Whelen Modified Tour
- 2024 NASCAR Canada Series
- 2024 NASCAR Mexico Series
- 2024 NASCAR Whelen Euro Series
- 2024 NASCAR Brasil Sprint Race
- 2024 SMART Modified Tour
- 2024 ASA STARS National Tour
