= Dustin Storm =

American racing driver (born 1980)

- Born: June 1, 1980 (age 46) Prince Frederick, Maryland, U.S.

CARS Late Model Stock Tour career
- Debut season: 2024
- Years active: 2024–present
- Starts: 4
- Championships: 0
- Wins: 0
- Poles: 0
- Best finish: 41st in 2025
- Statistics up to date as of October 30, 2025.

Dustin Storm (born June 1, 1980) is an American professional stock car racing driver. He last competed in the zMAX CARS Tour, driving the No. 28 for Scott Lang Racing.

Storm has also competed in the Virginia Late Model Triple Crown Series, the I-95 Showdown Series, and the NASCAR Weekly Series, and is a former track champion and competitor at the former Old Dominion Speedway, having won the Late Model title in 2001, and is a regular competitor at Dominion Raceway.

== Motorsports results ==
=== CARS Late Model Stock Car Tour ===
(key) (Bold – Pole position awarded by qualifying time. Italics – Pole position earned by points standings or practice time. * – Most laps led. ** – All laps led.)

CARS Late Model Stock Car Tour results
Year	Team	No.	Make	1	2	3	4	5	6	7	8	9	10	11	12	13	14	15	16	17	CLMSCTC	Pts	Ref
2024	Scott Lang Racing	28S	Toyota	SNM	HCY	AAS	OCS	ACE	TCM	LGY	DOM; 30	CRW	HCY	NWS	ACE	WCS	FLC	SBO	TCM	NWS	N/A	0	
2025	Scott Lang Racing	28S	N/A	AAS	WCS	CDL	OCS	ACE	NWS; 30												41st	56	
2025	Scott Lang Racing	28	N/A							LGY; 15	DOM; 25	CRW	HCY	AND	FLC	SBO	TCM	NWS			41st	56	
