= Dexter Canipe Jr. =

American racing driver

- Born: July 22, 1980 (age 46) Claremont, North Carolina, U.S.

CARS Late Model Stock Tour career
- Debut season: 2017
- Years active: 2017–2018, 2023–2024
- Starts: 10
- Championships: 0
- Wins: 0
- Poles: 0
- Best finish: 20th in 2017
- Statistics up to date as of October 27, 2025.

Dexter W. Canipe Jr. (born July 22, 1980) is an American professional stock car racing driver. He has previously competed in the zMAX CARS Tour from 2017 to 2024. He is the son of former racing driver Dexter Canipe.

Canipe has over one-hundred race victories at Hickory Motor Speedway.

Canipe has also competed in series such as the Virginia Late Model Triple Crown Series, the Carolina Pro Late Model Series, the Paramount Kia Big 10 Challenge, and the NASCAR Weekly Series, and is a former track champion at both Tri-County Motor Speedway and Hickory Motor Speedway.

== Motorsports results ==
=== CARS Late Model Stock Car Tour ===
(key) (Bold – Pole position awarded by qualifying time. Italics – Pole position earned by points standings or practice time. * – Most laps led. ** – All laps led.)

CARS Late Model Stock Car Tour results
Year	Team	No.	Make	1	2	3	4	5	6	7	8	9	10	11	12	13	14	15	16	17	CLMSCTC	Pts	Ref
2017	Dexter Canipe	23	Chevy	CON	DOM	DOM	HCY; 7	HCY; 10	BRI	AND	ROU	TCM; 7	ROU								20th	102	
2017	Dexter Canipe	1	Chevy											HCY; 6	CON	SBO					20th	102	
2018	Glenn Moffitt	5C	Chevy	TCM; 25	MYB; 24	ROU	HCY; 15	BRI	ACE	CCS	KPT	HCY	WKS	ROU	SBO						34th	35	
2023	CR7 Motorsports	97A	Chevy	SNM	FLC	HCY	ACE; 17	NWS	LGY	DOM	CRW	HCY	ACE								48th	24	
2023	3D Motorsports	5D	Chevy											TCM; 25	WKS	AAS	SBO	TCM	CRW		48th	24	
2024	3D Motorsports	5D	Chevy	SNM	HCY	AAS	OCS	ACE	TCM; 11	LGY	DOM	CRW	HCY	NWS	ACE	WCS	FLC	SBO	TCM	NWS	N/A	0	
