= Aaron Donnelly (racing driver) =

American racing driver

- Born: 1999 or 2000 (age 26–27) Montross, Virginia, U.S.

CARS Late Model Stock Tour career
- Debut season: 2024
- Years active: 2024–present
- Starts: 3
- Championships: 0
- Wins: 0
- Poles: 0
- Best finish: 48th in 2025
- Statistics up to date as of October 30, 2025.

Aaron Donnelly (born 1999 or 2000) is an American professional stock car racing driver. He last competed in the zMAX CARS Tour, driving the No. 71 Chevrolet for Hettinger Racing, and the No. 31 for Mike Darne Racing.

Donnelly has also competed in the Virginia Late Model Triple Crown Series, the I-95 Showdown Series, and the NASCAR Weekly Series.

== Motorsports results ==
=== CARS Late Model Stock Car Tour ===
(key) (Bold – Pole position awarded by qualifying time. Italics – Pole position earned by points standings or practice time. * – Most laps led. ** – All laps led.)

CARS Late Model Stock Car Tour results
Year	Team	No.	Make	1	2	3	4	5	6	7	8	9	10	11	12	13	14	15	16	17	CLMSCTC	Pts	Ref
2024	Hettinger Racing	71	Chevy	SNM	HCY	AAS	OCS	ACE	TCM	LGY	DOM	CRW	HCY	NWS	ACE	WCS	FLC	SBO; 13	TCM; 17	NWS; DNS	N/A	0	
2025	Hettinger Racing	71	Chevy	AAS; DNQ	WCS; DNS	CDL	OCS	ACE	NWS	LGY											48th	45	
2025	Mike Darne Racing	31	N/A								DOM; 8	CRW	HCY	AND	FLC	SBO	TCM	NWS			48th	45	
