= 2026 Ecosave 200 (Dover) =

NASCAR Craftsman Truck Series race at Dover Motor Speedway

Race details
- Race 9 of 25 in the 2026 NASCAR Craftsman Truck Series
- Date: May 15, 2026
- Location: Dover Motor Speedway in Dover, Delaware
- Course: Permanent racing facility
- Course length: 1 miles (1.6 km)
- Distance: 200 laps, 200 mi (321.868 km)
- Average speed: 108.124 miles per hour (174.009 km/h)

Pole position
Driver	Kyle Busch	Spire Motorsports
- Time: 22.258

Most laps led
Driver	Kyle Busch	Spire Motorsports
- Laps: 147

Fastest lap
Driver	Kyle Busch	Spire Motorsports
- Time: 23.149

Winner
No. 7	Kyle Busch	Spire Motorsports

Television in the United States
- Network: FS1
- Announcers: Jamie Little, Michael Waltrip, and Daniel Suárez

Radio in the United States
- Radio: NRN
- Booth announcers: Brad Gillie and Nick Yeoman
- Turn announcers: Pat Patterson (1 & 2) and Doug Turnbull (3 & 4)

The 2026 Ecosave 200 was a NASCAR Craftsman Truck Series race held on Friday, May 15, 2026, at Dover Motor Speedway in Dover, Delaware. Contested over 200 laps on the 1-mile (1.6 km) concrete oval, it was the ninth race of the 2026 NASCAR Craftsman Truck Series season, and the inaugural running of the event after a six-year absence of Truck racing at Dover.

In the first Truck Series race at Dover since 2020, Kyle Busch, driving for Spire Motorsports, put on a blistering performance, sweeping the stages and led a race-high 147 laps from the pole position to earn his 69th and final career NASCAR Craftsman Truck Series win, and his second of the season. Ty Majeski finished second, and Layne Riggs finished third. Kaden Honeycutt and Christopher Bell rounded out the top five, while Brandon Jones, Christian Eckes, Corey LaJoie, Jake Garcia, and Justin Haley rounded out the top ten.

This would be Kyle Busch's last career win before his unexpected death six days later due to a severe illness on May 21.

The race also made history as Dystany Spurlock became the first African American woman to compete in a NASCAR national series race. She finished 36th after wrecking early in the event.

== Report ==
=== Background ===
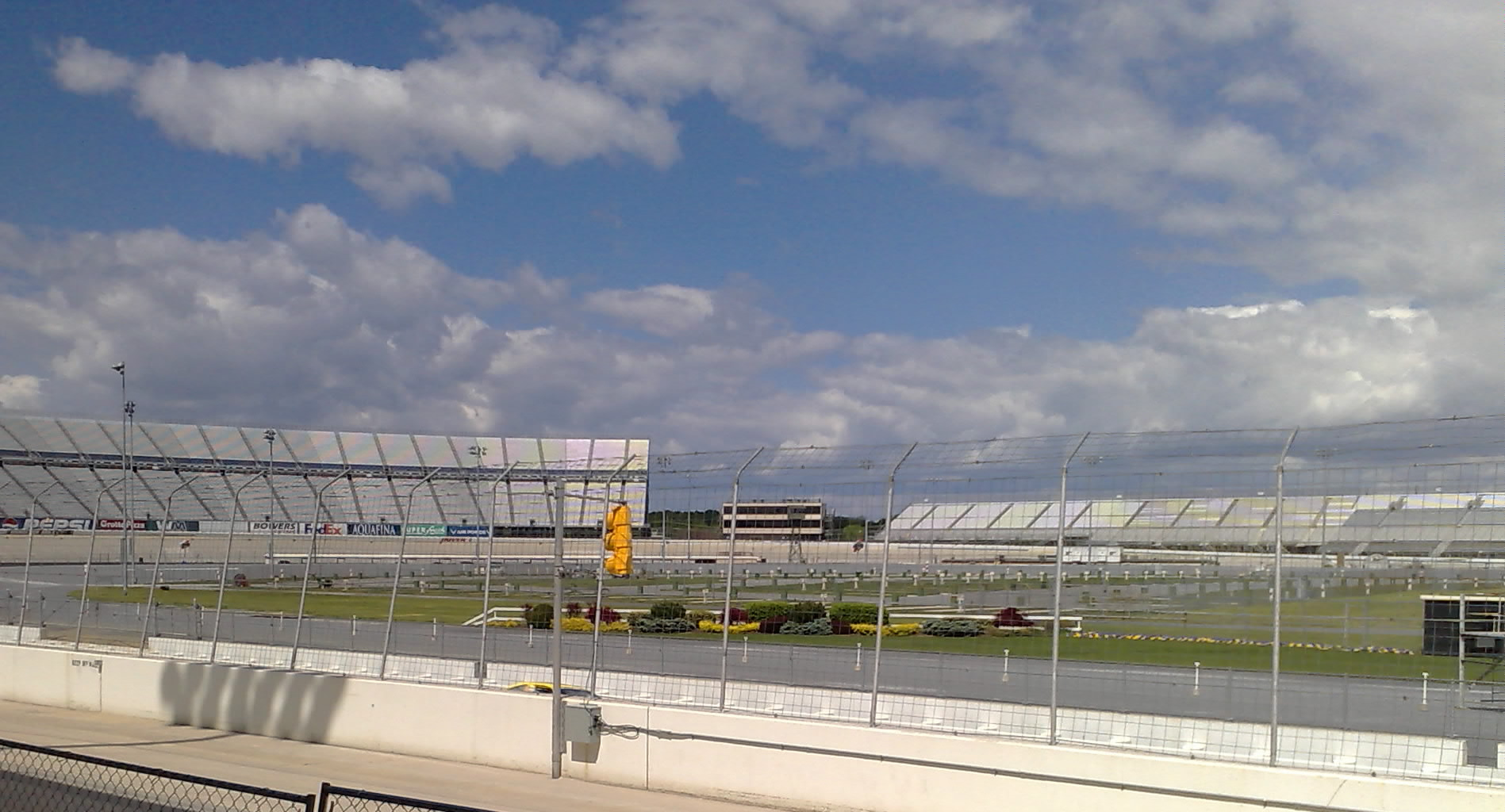
Dover Motor Speedway, the circuit where the race was held.

Dover Motor Speedway is an oval race track in Dover, Delaware, United States that has held at least two NASCAR races since it opened in 1969. In addition to NASCAR, the track also hosted USAC and the NTT IndyCar Series. The track features one layout, a 1 mile (1.6 km) concrete oval, with 24° banking in the turns and 9° banking on the straights. The speedway is owned and operated by Speedway Motorsports.

The track, nicknamed "The Monster Mile", was built in 1969 by Melvin Joseph of Melvin L. Joseph Construction Company, Inc., with an asphalt surface, but was replaced with concrete in 1995. Six years later in 2001, the track's capacity moved to 135,000 seats, making the track have the largest capacity of sports venue in the mid-Atlantic. In 2002, the name changed to Dover International Speedway from Dover Downs International Speedway after Dover Downs Gaming and Entertainment split, making Dover Motorsports. From 2007 to 2009, the speedway worked on an improvement project called "The Monster Makeover", which expanded facilities at the track and beautified the track. After the 2014 season, the track's capacity was reduced to 95,500 seats.

This will be the first NASCAR Craftsman Truck Series since 2020. Ecosave, who sponsored two races in the series last year, was announced as the title sponsor on November 18, 2025.

==== Entry list ====
- (R) denotes rookie driver.
- (i) denotes driver who is ineligible for series driver points.

#	Driver	Team	Make
1	Brandon Jones (i)	Tricon Garage	Toyota
2	Luke Baldwin	Team Reaume	Ford
5	William Sawalich (i)	Tricon Garage	Toyota
7	Kyle Busch (i)	Spire Motorsports	Chevrolet
9	Grant Enfinger	CR7 Motorsports	Chevrolet
10	Corey LaJoie	Kaulig Racing	Ram
11	Kaden Honeycutt	Tricon Garage	Toyota
12	Brenden Queen (R)	Kaulig Racing	Ram
13	Cole Butcher (R)	ThorSport Racing	Ford
14	Mini Tyrrell (R)	Kaulig Racing	Ram
15	Tanner Gray	Tricon Garage	Toyota
16	Justin Haley	Kaulig Racing	Ram
17	Gio Ruggiero	Tricon Garage	Toyota
18	Tyler Ankrum	McAnally–Hilgemann Racing	Chevrolet
19	Daniel Hemric	McAnally–Hilgemann Racing	Chevrolet
22	Natalie Decker	Team Reaume	Ford
25	Clint Bowyer	Kaulig Racing	Ram
26	Dawson Sutton	Rackley W.A.R.	Chevrolet
27	Toni Breidinger	Rackley W.A.R.	Chevrolet
33	Frankie Muniz	Team Reaume	Ford
34	Layne Riggs	Front Row Motorsports	Ford
38	Chandler Smith	Front Row Motorsports	Ford
42	Parker Eatmon	Niece Motorsports	Chevrolet
44	Andrés Pérez de Lara	Niece Motorsports	Chevrolet
45	Ross Chastain (i)	Niece Motorsports	Chevrolet
52	Stewart Friesen	Halmar Friesen Racing	Toyota
56	Timmy Hill	Hill Motorsports	Toyota
62	Christopher Bell (i)	Halmar Friesen Racing	Toyota
69	Dystany Spurlock	MBM Motorsports	Ford
76	Spencer Boyd	Freedom Racing Enterprises	Chevrolet
77	Carson Hocevar (i)	Spire Motorsports	Chevrolet
81	Kris Wright	McAnally–Hilgemann Racing	Chevrolet
88	Ty Majeski	ThorSport Racing	Ford
91	Christian Eckes	McAnally–Hilgemann Racing	Chevrolet
93	Caleb Costner	Costner Motorsports	Chevrolet
98	Jake Garcia	ThorSport Racing	Ford
99	Ben Rhodes	ThorSport Racing	Ford
Official entry list

== Practice ==
The first and only practice session was held on Friday, May 15, at 12:30 PM EST, and lasted for 50 minutes.

Kyle Busch, driving for Spire Motorsports, set the fastest time in the session, with a lap of 22.446 seconds, and a speed of 160.385 miles per hour (258.115 km/h).

=== Practice results ===
Pos.	#	Driver	Team	Make	Time	Speed
1	7	Kyle Busch (i)	Spire Motorsports	Chevrolet	22.446	160.385
2	88	Ty Majeski	ThorSport Racing	Ford	22.541	159.709
3	99	Ben Rhodes	ThorSport Racing	Ford	22.618	159.165
Full practice results

== Qualifying ==
Qualifying was held on Friday, May 15, at 1:40 PM EST. Since Dover Motor Speedway is a mile oval, the qualifying procedure used was a single-car, two-lap system with one round. Drivers were on track by themselves and had two laps to post a qualifying time, and whoever set the fastest time won the pole.

Kyle Busch, driving for Spire Motorsports, qualified on pole position with a lap of 22.258 seconds, and a speed of 161.740 miles per hour (260.295 km/h).

No drivers failed to qualify.

=== Qualifying results ===
Pos.	#	Driver	Team	Make	Time	Speed
1	7	Kyle Busch (i)	Spire Motorsports	Chevrolet	22.258	161.740
2	88	Ty Majeski	ThorSport Racing	Ford	22.285	161.544
3	17	Gio Ruggiero	Tricon Garage	Toyota	22.339	161.153
4	11	Kaden Honeycutt	Tricon Garage	Toyota	22.354	161.045
5	62	Christopher Bell (i)	Halmar Friesen Racing	Toyota	22.379	160.865
6	1	Brandon Jones (i)	Tricon Garage	Toyota	22.387	160.808
7	98	Jake Garcia	ThorSport Racing	Ford	22.423	160.549
8	45	Ross Chastain (i)	Niece Motorsports	Chevrolet	22.428	160.514
9	44	Andrés Pérez de Lara	Niece Motorsports	Chevrolet	22.436	160.456
10	19	Daniel Hemric	McAnally–Hilgemann Racing	Chevrolet	22.442	160.414
11	34	Layne Riggs	Front Row Motorsports	Ford	22.448	160.371
12	99	Ben Rhodes	ThorSport Racing	Ford	22.464	160.256
13	52	Stewart Friesen	Halmar Friesen Racing	Toyota	22.473	160.192
14	38	Chandler Smith	Front Row Motorsports	Ford	22.477	160.164
15	13	Cole Butcher (R)	ThorSport Racing	Ford	22.481	160.135
16	14	Mini Tyrrell (R)	Kaulig Racing	Ram	22.545	159.681
17	12	Brenden Queen (R)	Kaulig Racing	Ram	22.580	159.433
18	77	Carson Hocevar (i)	Spire Motorsports	Chevrolet	22.600	159.292
19	9	Grant Enfinger	CR7 Motorsports	Chevrolet	22.608	159.236
20	42	Parker Eatmon	Niece Motorsports	Chevrolet	22.611	159.215
21	15	Tanner Gray	Tricon Garage	Toyota	22.650	158.940
22	25	Clint Bowyer	Kaulig Racing	Ram	22.661	158.863
23	5	William Sawalich (i)	Tricon Garage	Toyota	22.686	158.688
24	26	Dawson Sutton	Rackley W.A.R.	Chevrolet	22.767	158.124
25	2	Luke Baldwin	Team Reaume	Ford	22.822	157.743
26	16	Justin Haley	Kaulig Racing	Ram	22.843	157.598
27	91	Christian Eckes	McAnally–Hilgemann Racing	Chevrolet	22.897	157.226
28	10	Corey LaJoie	Kaulig Racing	Ram	22.938	156.945
29	81	Kris Wright	McAnally–Hilgemann Racing	Chevrolet	22.976	156.685
30	18	Tyler Ankrum	McAnally–Hilgemann Racing	Chevrolet	22.985	156.624
31	33	Frankie Muniz	Team Reaume	Ford	23.566	152.762
Qualified by owner's points
32	27	Toni Breidinger	Rackley W.A.R.	Chevrolet	23.589	152.614
33	22	Natalie Decker	Team Reaume	Ford	23.693	151.944
34	69	Dystany Spurlock	MBM Motorsports	Ford	23.721	151.764
35	76	Spencer Boyd	Freedom Racing Enterprises	Chevrolet	23.986	150.088
36	93	Caleb Costner	Costner Motorsports	Chevrolet	24.546	146.663
Official qualifying results
Official starting lineup

== Race ==
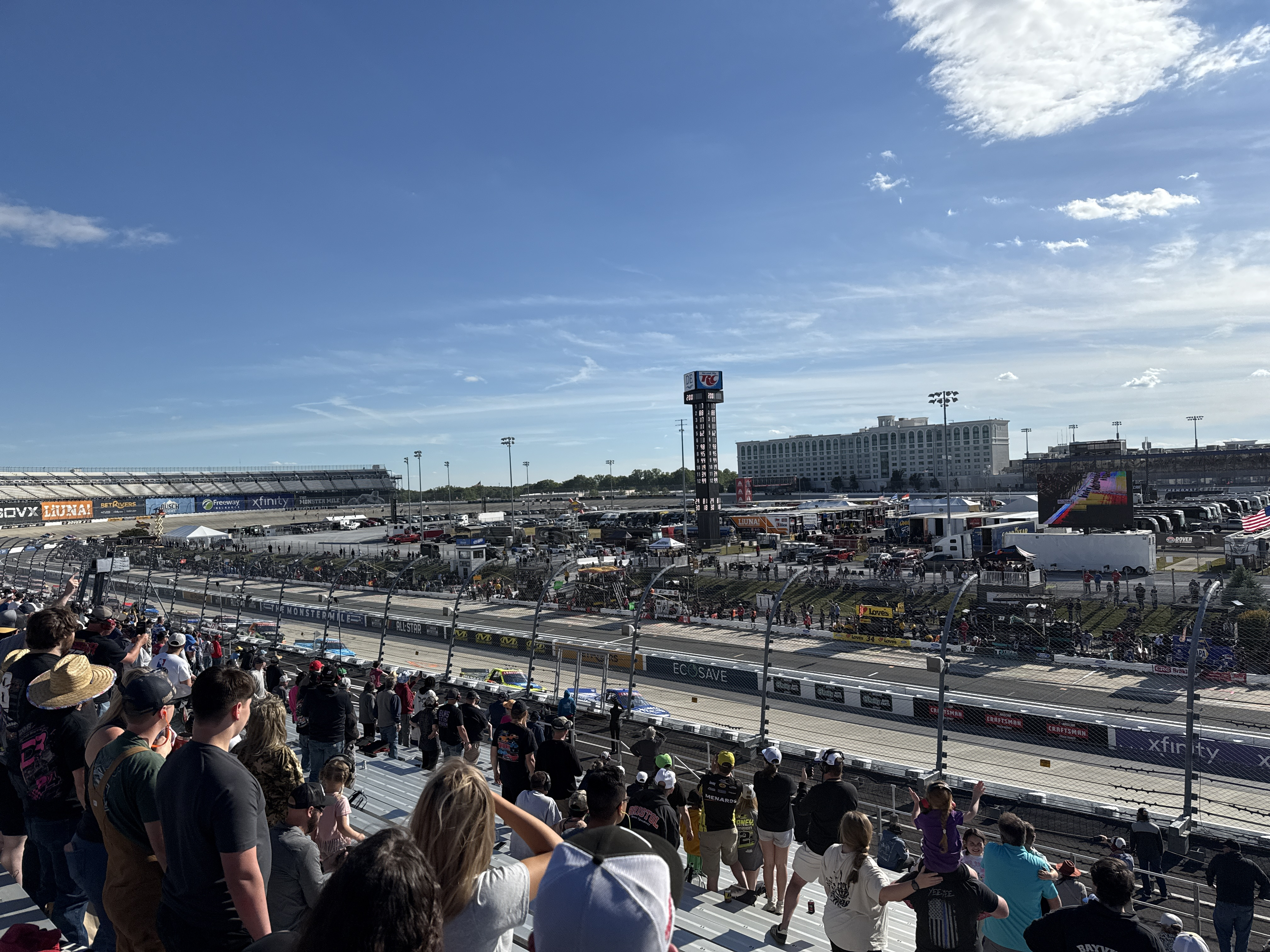
Eventual race winner Kyle Busch leads at the beginning of the race

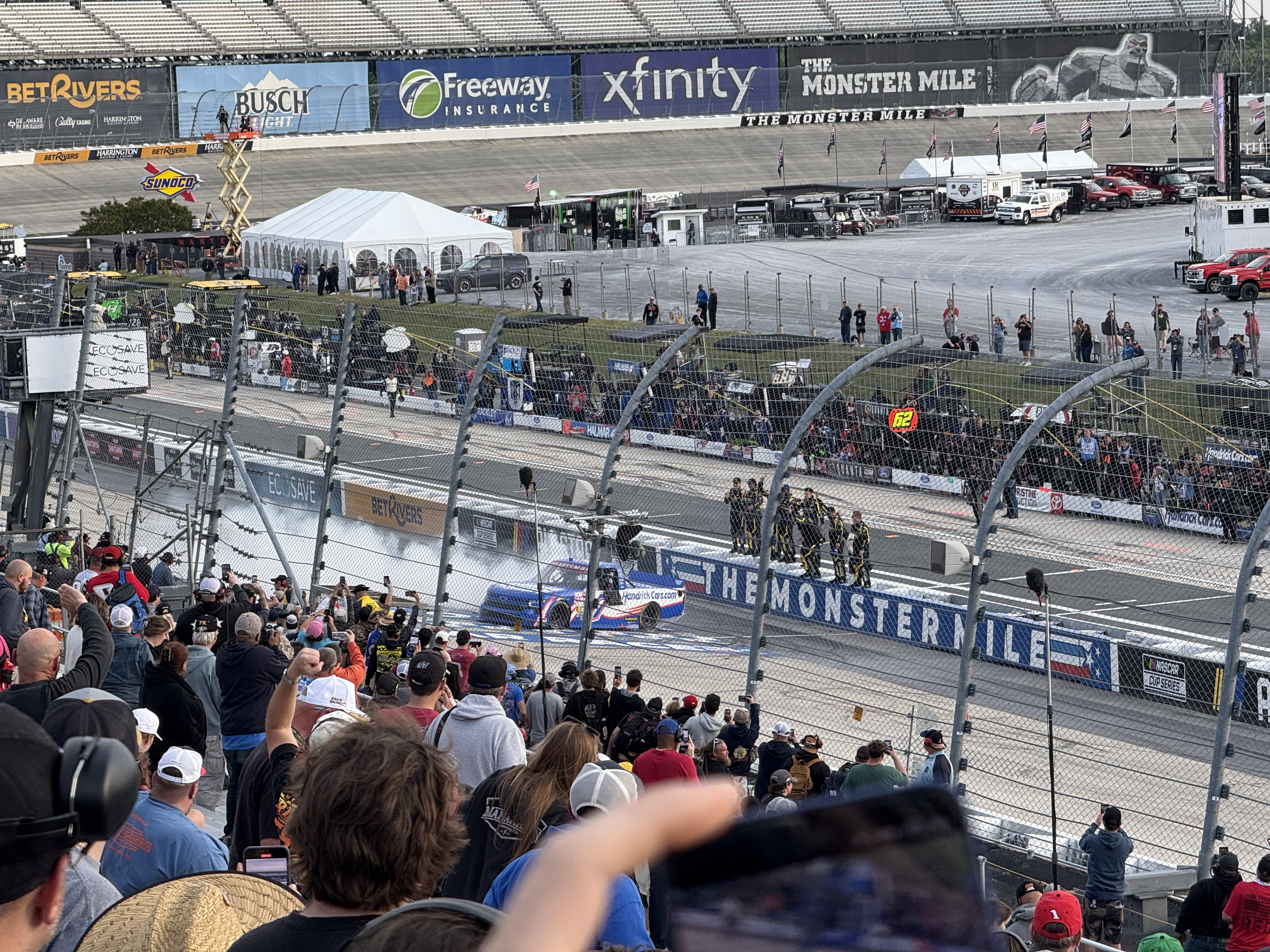
Kyle Busch celebrates his victory with a burnout

=== Race results ===
==== Stage results ====
Stage One Laps: 45

Pos.	#	Driver	Team	Make	Pts
1	7	Kyle Busch (i)	Spire Motorsports	Chevrolet	0
2	88	Ty Majeski	ThorSport Racing	Ford	9
3	13	Cole Butcher (R)	ThorSport Racing	Ford	8
4	45	Ross Chastain (i)	Niece Motorsports	Chevrolet	0
5	77	Carson Hocevar (i)	Spire Motorsports	Chevrolet	0
6	17	Gio Ruggiero	Tricon Garage	Toyota	5
7	98	Jake Garcia	ThorSport Racing	Ford	4
8	62	Christopher Bell (i)	Halmar Friesen Racing	Toyota	0
9	34	Layne Riggs	Front Row Motorsports	Ford	2
10	9	Grant Enfinger	CR7 Motorsports	Chevrolet	1

Stage Two Laps: 45

Pos.	#	Driver	Team	Make	Pts
1	7	Kyle Busch (i)	Spire Motorsports	Chevrolet	0
2	45	Ross Chastain (i)	Niece Motorsports	Chevrolet	0
3	88	Ty Majeski	ThorSport Racing	Ford	8
4	17	Gio Ruggiero	Tricon Garage	Toyota	7
5	62	Christopher Bell (i)	Halmar Friesen Racing	Toyota	0
6	77	Carson Hocevar (i)	Spire Motorsports	Chevrolet	0
7	34	Layne Riggs	Front Row Motorsports	Ford	4
8	1	Brandon Jones (i)	Tricon Garage	Toyota	0
9	11	Kaden Honeycutt	Tricon Garage	Toyota	2
10	9	Grant Enfinger	CR7 Motorsports	Chevrolet	1

=== Final Stage results ===
Stage Three Laps: 110

Fin	St	#	Driver	Team	Make	Laps	Led	Status	Pts
1	1	7	Kyle Busch (i)	Spire Motorsports	Chevrolet	200	147	Running	0
2	2	88	Ty Majeski	ThorSport Racing	Ford	200	0	Running	52
3	11	34	Layne Riggs	Front Row Motorsports	Ford	200	0	Running	40
4	4	11	Kaden Honeycutt	Tricon Garage	Toyota	200	1	Running	35
5	5	62	Christopher Bell (i)	Halmar Friesen Racing	Toyota	200	0	Running	0
6	6	1	Brandon Jones (i)	Tricon Garage	Toyota	200	0	Running	0
7	27	91	Christian Eckes	McAnally–Hilgemann Racing	Chevrolet	200	0	Running	30
8	28	10	Corey LaJoie	Kaulig Racing	Ram	200	0	Running	29
9	7	98	Jake Garcia	ThorSport Racing	Ford	200	0	Running	32
10	26	16	Justin Haley	Kaulig Racing	Ram	200	0	Running	27
11	13	52	Stewart Friesen	Halmar Friesen Racing	Toyota	200	0	Running	26
12	14	38	Chandler Smith	Front Row Motorsports	Ford	200	0	Running	25
13	17	12	Brenden Queen (R)	Kaulig Racing	Ram	200	0	Running	24
14	23	5	William Sawalich (i)	Tricon Garage	Toyota	199	0	Running	0
15	19	9	Grant Enfinger	CR7 Motorsports	Chevrolet	199	0	Running	24
16	21	15	Tanner Gray	Tricon Garage	Toyota	199	0	Running	21
17	29	81	Kris Wright	McAnally–Hilgemann Racing	Chevrolet	199	0	Running	20
18	8	45	Ross Chastain (i)	Niece Motorsports	Chevrolet	199	49	Running	0
19	12	99	Ben Rhodes	ThorSport Racing	Ford	198	0	Running	18
20	3	17	Gio Ruggiero	Tricon Garage	Toyota	197	0	Running	29
21	20	42	Parker Eatmon	Niece Motorsports	Chevrolet	197	0	Running	16
22	35	76	Spencer Boyd	Freedom Racing Enterprises	Chevrolet	196	0	Running	15
23	24	26	Dawson Sutton	Rackley W.A.R.	Chevrolet	196	0	Running	14
24	31	33	Frankie Muniz	Team Reaume	Ford	195	0	Running	13
25	30	18	Tyler Ankrum	McAnally–Hilgemann Racing	Chevrolet	195	0	Running	12
26	32	27	Toni Breidinger	Rackley W.A.R.	Chevrolet	194	0	Running	11
27	16	14	Mini Tyrrell (R)	Kaulig Racing	Ram	194	0	Running	10
28	9	44	Andrés Pérez de Lara	Niece Motorsports	Chevrolet	189	0	Running	9
29	22	25	Clint Bowyer	Kaulig Racing	Ram	181	0	Hub	8
30	10	19	Daniel Hemric	McAnally–Hilgemann Racing	Chevrolet	177	0	Running	7
31	18	77	Carson Hocevar (i)	Spire Motorsports	Chevrolet	167	0	Suspension	0
32	25	2	Luke Baldwin	Team Reaume	Ford	116	0	Accident	5
33	15	13	Cole Butcher (R)	ThorSport Racing	Ford	84	3	Accident	12
34	33	22	Natalie Decker	Team Reaume	Ford	81	0	Too Slow	3
35	36	93	Caleb Costner	Costner Motorsports	Chevrolet	53	0	Vibration	2
36	34	69	Dystany Spurlock	MBM Motorsports	Ford	36	0	Accident	1
Official race results

=== Race statistics ===
- Lead changes: 5 among 4 different drivers
- Cautions/Laps: 5 for 28 laps
- Red flags: 0
- Time of race: 1 hour, 50 minutes and 59 seconds
- Average speed: 108.124 miles per hour (174.009 km/h)

== Standings after the race ==
Drivers' Championship standings

	Pos	Driver	Points
	1	Kaden Honeycutt	347
1	2	Layne Riggs	309 (–38)
1	3	Chandler Smith	308 (–39)
	4	Gio Ruggiero	286 (–61)
2	5	Ty Majeski	277 (–70)
1	6	Christian Eckes	271 (–76)
1	7	Ben Rhodes	246 (–101)
4	8	Jake Garcia	213 (–134)
2	9	Stewart Friesen	208 (–139)
1	10	Tyler Ankrum	206 (–141)
Official driver's standings

Manufacturers' Championship standings

Pos	Manufacturer	Points
1	Toyota	388
2	Chevrolet	365 (–23)
3	Ford	336 (–52)
4	Ram	254 (–134)

- Note: Only the first 10 positions are included for the driver standings.

Previous race: 2026 Bully Hill Vineyards 176 at The Glen	NASCAR Craftsman Truck Series; 2026 season	Next race: 2026 North Carolina Education Lottery 200
