= Wake County Speedway =

Speedway in Raleigh, North Carolina, USA

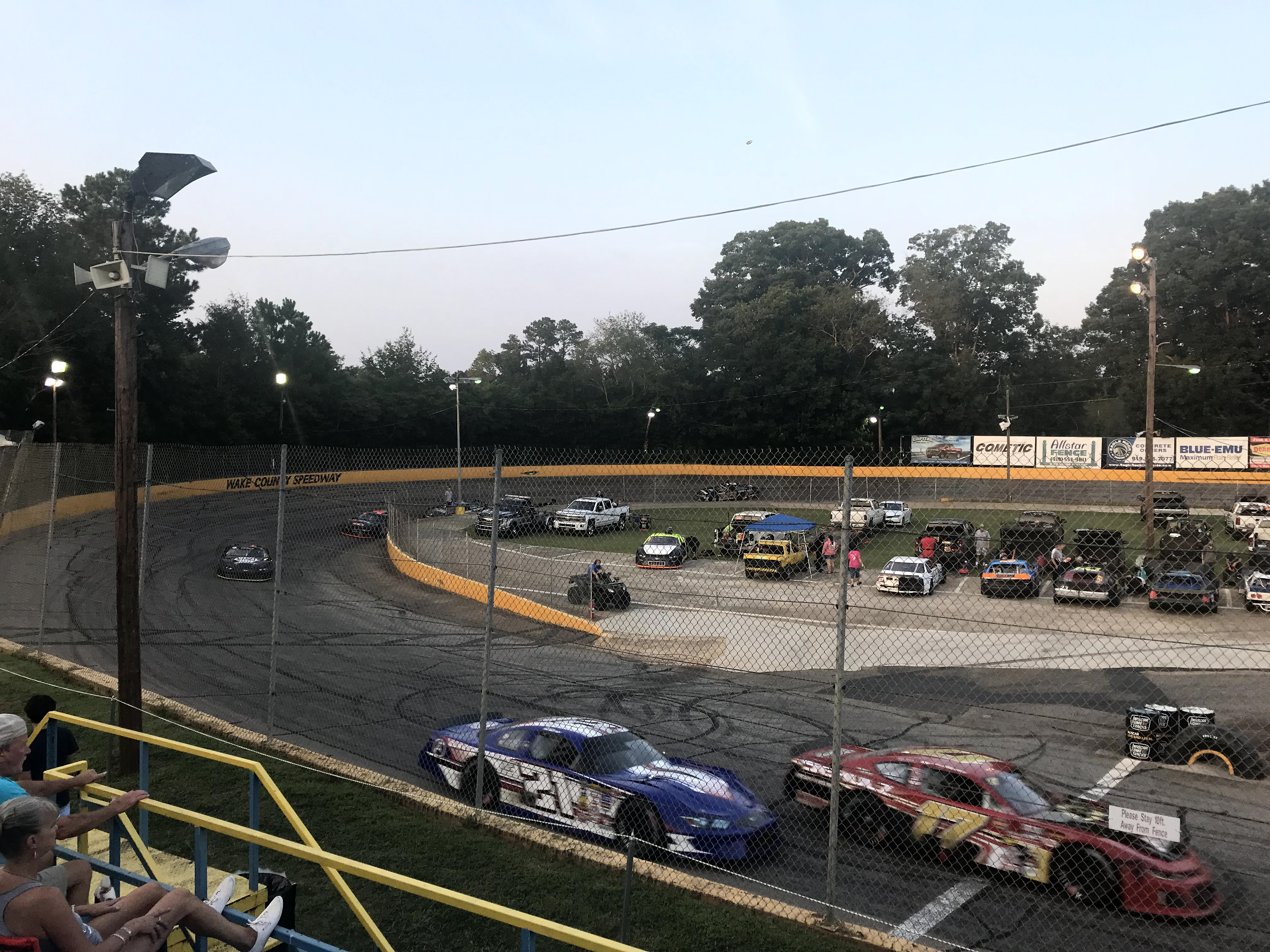
- Location: Raleigh, North Carolina
- Coordinates: 35°42′04″N 78°40′30″W
- Capacity: 2,200
- Owner: Charlie Hansen
- Opened: 1962
- Major events: Current: CARS Tour (2018, 2021, 2023–present); SMART Modified Tour (1989–1991, 2000–2002, 2004–2006, 2021–2023, 2026)
- Website: wcspeedway.com

Oval (1962–present)
- Surface: Asphalt
- Length: 0.250 mi (0.402 km)
- Turns: 2
- Banking: Corners: 7°

Wake County Speedway "America's Favorite Bullring" is a quarter-mile NASCAR Sanctioned asphalt race track located in Raleigh, North Carolina. The track holds stock car races on alternating Friday nights from April to September. As of the 2024 racing season, Wake County Speedway has seven main classes of race cars which include Late Model Stocks, Chargers, Legends, Mini Stocks, Bandoleros, Bombers and Champ Karts. The track also has special appearances from USAC, East Coast Flathead Fords, and the CARS Tour.

== History ==
Wake County Speedway was established in 1962 by Glenn Talmadge and Marvin Simpkins. It was leased out to Donald Macon until 1987. The Simpkins family operated the speedway from 1987 until 2013. It was leased by Adam Resinick for 2 seasons. Mike Stodder operated the track from 2015 to 2017. Charlie Hansen & Michael Diaz signed a long-term lease in 2018. Charlie Hansen purchased Michael's portion in 2022 and is currently operating the Speedway.

At its conception, the track was a 1/4 mile clay race track. Many former NASCAR drivers have made appearances during the tracks history. The drivers include J.D. McDuffie, Benny Parsons, Ken Schrader, Loy Allen, Jr., Dennis Setzer and Randy Renfrow. In 1987, the track was resurfaced with asphalt and remains that way today. In 2023, the track received funds from North Carolina's Motorsports Relief Fund to improve the infrastructure and repave the speedway.
