= Landon Pembelton =

American racing driver (born 2005)

- Born: February 2, 2005 (age 21); Amelia, Virginia, U.S.
- Achievements: 2021, 2025 ValleyStar Credit Union 300 Winner

ARCA Menards Series career
- 4 races run over 2 years
- Best finish: 28th (2022)
- First race: 2022 Menards 250 (Elko)
- Last race: 2023 Bush's Beans 200 (Bristol)
Wins	Top tens	Poles
0	4	0

ARCA Menards Series East career
- 2 races run over 2 years
- Best finish: 33rd (2023)
- First race: 2022 Sprecher 150 (Milwaukee)
- Last race: 2023 Bush's Beans 200 (Bristol)
Wins	Top tens	Poles
0	2	0

ARCA Menards Series West career
- 1 race run over 1 year
- Best finish: 34th (2022)
- First race: 2022 Desert Diamond Casino West Valley 100 (Phoenix)
Wins	Top tens	Poles
0	1	0
- Statistics up to date as of August 31, 2023.

Landon Pembelton (born February 2, 2005) is an American professional stock car racing driver who competes full-time in the Late Model Stock Car division at South Boston Speedway and the Virginia Triple Crown, driving the No. 0 Dodge for R&S Race Cars.

== Racing career ==
=== Early career ===
Pembelton debuted in organized racing in 2019, running eight races at South Boston Speedway, collecting six top-fives. The following year, Pembelton won the Virginia Racers Challenge Series, which was run at Dominion Raceway and at Langley Speedway. In 2021, Pembelton was the 2021 Virginia State Division I and South East Division I rookie of the year. He also finished tenth in the NASCAR Advance Auto Parts Weekly Series standings.

Pembelton took the victory in the 2021 ValleyStar Credit Union 300, considered to be one of the biggest, most prestigious late-model races. Pembelton beat out drivers such as Sammy Smith, Bubba Pollard, Peyton Sellers, Corey Heim, and Timothy Peters becoming the youngest guest driver to claim victory in this race. In 2025, Pembelton scored his second Valley Star Credit Union win against Lee Pulliam in the narrowest margin of victory in the race’s history at .024 seconds.

=== ARCA Menards Series ===
On January 8, 2022, it was announced that Pembelton would make his ARCA Menards Series debut, running the No. 15 Toyota Camry for Venturini Motorsports at Elko Speedway on a three-race schedule.

On August 29, 2023, Mullins Racing announced that Pembelton would drive their No. 3 car in the main ARCA Series/ARCA Menards Series East combination race at Bristol. This would be his first ARCA start of the year.

== Personal life ==
Pembelton's father, Brian, was a short track driver in Virginia, and was the 2009 Limited Sportsman division champion at South Boston Speedway.

== Motorsports career results ==
=== Stock car career summary ===
Season	Series	Team	Races	Wins	Top 5	Top 10	Points	Position
2022	CARS Late Model Stock Car Tour	N/A	3	0	0	2	80	25th
2022	ARCA Menards Series West	Venturini Motorsports	1	0	1	1	90	34th
2022	ARCA Menards Series East	Venturini Motorsports	1	0	0	1	38	40th
2022	ARCA Menards Series	Venturini Motorsports	3	0	1	3	116	29th
2023	CARS Late Model Stock Car Tour	Sellers Racing Inc.	6	0	0	1	78	31st
2023	ARCA Menards Series East	Mullins Racing	1	0	0	1	37	33rd
2023	ARCA Menards Series	Mullins Racing	1	0	0	1	37	78th
2024	CARS Late Model Stock Car Tour	Sellers Racing Inc.	2	0	0	0	0	N/A
2025	ASA STARS National Tour	Matt Craig	0	0	0	0	5	83rd
2025	CARS Late Model Stock Car Tour	Sellers Racing Inc.	1	0	0	0	15	95th
2026	CARS Pro Late Model Tour	GMS Race Cars	1	0	0	0	29	54th
2026	CARS Late Model Stock Car Tour	R&S Race Cars	1	0	0	0	32	58th

=== ARCA Menards Series ===
(key) (Bold – Pole position awarded by qualifying time. Italics – Pole position earned by points standings or practice time. * – Most laps led. ** – All laps led.)

ARCA Menards Series results
Year	Team	No.	Make	1	2	3	4	5	6	7	8	9	10	11	12	13	14	15	16	17	18	19	20	AMSC	Pts	Ref
2022	Venturini Motorsports	15	Toyota	DAY	PHO	TAL	KAN	CLT	IOW	BLN	ELK; 3	MOH	POC	IRP	MCH	GLN	ISF	MLW; 6	DSF	KAN	BRI	SLM	TOL; 7	29th	116	
2023	Mullins Racing	3	Ford	DAY	PHO	TAL	KAN	CLT	BLN	ELK	MOH	IOW	POC	MCH	IRP	GLN	ISF	MLW	DSF	KAN	BRI; 7	SLM	TOL	78th	37	

==== ARCA Menards Series East ====
ARCA Menards Series East results
Year	Team	No.	Make	1	2	3	4	5	6	7	8	AMSWC	Pts	Ref
2022	Venturini Motorsports	15	Toyota	NSM	FIF	DOV	NSV	IOW	MLW; 6	BRI		40th	38	
2023	Mullins Racing	3	Ford	FIF	DOV	NSV	FRS	IOW	IRP	MLW	BRI; 7	33rd	37	

==== ARCA Menards Series West ====
ARCA Menards Series West results
Year	Team	No.	Make	1	2	3	4	5	6	7	8	9	10	11	AMSWC	Pts	Ref
2022	Venturini Motorsports	55	Toyota	PHO	IRW	KCR	PIR	SON	IRW	EVG	PIR	AAS	LVS	PHO; 4	34th	90	

=== CARS Late Model Stock Car Tour ===
(key) (Bold – Pole position awarded by qualifying time. Italics – Pole position earned by points standings or practice time. * – Most laps led. ** – All laps led.)

CARS Late Model Stock Car Tour results
Year	Team	No.	Make	1	2	3	4	5	6	7	8	9	10	11	12	13	14	15	16	17	CLMSCTC	Pts	Ref
2022	N/A	00	Toyota	CRW	HCY	GRE	AAS	FCS	LGY	DOM; 3											25th	80	
2022	N/A	83	Toyota								HCY; 17	ACE	MMS	NWS	TCM	ACE					25th	80	
2022	N/A	0	Toyota														SBO; 3	CRW			25th	80	
2023	Sellers Racing Inc.	0	Toyota	SNM; 15	FLC; 21	HCY; DNQ	ACE; 24	NWS; 34	LGY	DOM; 6	CRW	HCY	ACE	TCM	WKS	AAS	SBO; 24	TCM	CRW		31st	78	
2024	Sellers Racing Inc.	0	Toyota	SNM	HCY	AAS	OCS	ACE	TCM	LGY	DOM; 11	CRW	HCY	NWS; 12	ACE	WCS	FLC	SBO	TCM	NWS	N/A	0	
2025	Sellers Racing Inc.	0	Toyota	AAS	WCS	CDL	OCS	ACE	NWS	LGY	DOM; 27	CRW	HCY	AND	FLC	SBO	TCM	NWS			95th	15	
2026	R&S Race Cars	0	Dodge	SNM	WCS	NSV; 11	CRW	ACE	LGY	DOM	NWS	HCY	AND	FLC	TCM	NPS	SBO				58th	32	

=== CARS Pro Late Model Tour ===
(key)

CARS Pro Late Model Tour results
Year	Team	No.	Make	1	2	3	4	5	6	7	8	9	10	11	CPLMTC	Pts	Ref
2026	GMS Race Cars	23	Chevy	SNM	NSV	CRW	ACE	NWS	HCY	AND	FLC	TCM	NPS	SBO; 13	54th	29	

=== ASA STARS National Tour ===
(key) (Bold – Pole position awarded by qualifying time. Italics – Pole position earned by points standings or practice time. * – Most laps led. ** – All laps led.)

ASA STARS National Tour results
Year	Team	No.	Make	1	2	3	4	5	6	7	8	9	10	11	12	ASNTC	Pts	Ref
2025	Matt Craig	0	N/A	NSM	FIF	DOM; DNS	HCY	NPS	MAD	SLG	AND	OWO	TOL	WIN	NSV	83rd	5	
