= Doug Barnes Jr. =

American racing driver and YouTuber

- Born: December 16, 1996 (age 29) Whiteford, Maryland, U.S.

CARS Late Model Stock Tour career
- Debut season: 2015
- Years active: 2015, 2019, 2025–present
- Starts: 31
- Championships: 0
- Wins: 0
- Poles: 1
- Best finish: 8th in 2025

YouTube information
- Channel: AirDoug
- Genre: Motorsports
- Subscribers: 64.4 thousand
- Views: 54.2 million
- Last updated: December 15, 2025
- Statistics up to date as of October 18, 2026.

Doug Barnes Jr. (born December 16, 1996) is an American professional stock car racing driver and YouTube personality. He currently competes in the zMAX CARS Tour, driving the No. 88B Chevrolet for Barnes Racing, having previously driven for Lee Pulliam Performance.

Barnes is also known for his nickname and online handle AirDoug. He has stated that it originated from an incident during a NASCAR Weekly Series race at Dominion Raceway, where he and Tyler Hughes were involved in a crash and Barnes jumped on top of Hughes' car. Barnes would be given a suspension by NASCAR until August 14 of that year and handed a 1,000 USD fine, while Hughes was rendered unconscious from the crash and was taken to a nearby hospital but was released afterwards.

Barnes has also competed in series such as the Virginia Late Model Triple Crown Series, the Ultra Racing Association, the Southeast Limited Late Model Series, the INEX Winter Heat Series, and the NASCAR Weekly Series.

== Motorsports results ==
=== CARS Late Model Stock Car Tour ===
(key) (Bold – Pole position awarded by qualifying time. Italics – Pole position earned by points standings or practice time. * – Most laps led. ** – All laps led.)

CARS Late Model Stock Car Tour results
Year	Team	No.	Make	1	2	3	4	5	6	7	8	9	10	11	12	13	14	15	CLMSCTC	Pts	Ref
2015	Doug Bernes Sr.	88D	Chevy	SNM; 30	ROU; 15	HCY; 15	SNM	TCM	MMS; 5	ROU	CON	MYB	HCY						27th	67	
2019	Doug Bernes Sr.	88B	Chevy	SNM	HCY	ROU	ACE	MMS	LGY	DOM; 6	CCS	HCY	ROU	SBO					41st	27	
2025	Lee Pulliam Performance	88B	Toyota	AAS; 7	WCS; 3	CDL; 10	OCS; 25	ACE; 10	NWS; 20	LGY; 18	DOM; 6	CRW; 5		AND; 14	FLC; 25	SBO; 22	TCM; 15	NWS; 12	8th	433	
2025	Lee Pulliam Performance	3	Toyota										HCY; 5						8th	433	
2026	Barnes Racing	88B	Chevy	SNM; 3	WCS; 15	NSV; 18	CRW; 27	ACE; 12	**LGY**; 20	DOM; 9	NWS; Wth	HCY	AND	FLC; 8	TCM; 18	NPS; 22			12th	294	
2026	Barnes Racing	88B	Toyota														SBO; 26		12th	294	
