= Philip Morris (racing driver) =

American racing driver

- Born: May 11, 1965 (age 61); Ruckersville, Virginia, U.S.
- Height: 6 ft 0 in (183 cm)
- Achievements: 2006, 2008, 2009, 2011, 2018 Whelen All-American Series National Champion; 2000, 2010, 2012 ValleyStar Credit Union 300 winner 2017 Thunder Road 200 winner 2018 Hampton Heat 200 winner

NASCAR O'Reilly Auto Parts Series career
- 12 races run over 4 years
- Best finish: 74th (2000)
- First race: 1998 AC-Delco 200 (Rockingham)
- Last race: 2001 GNC Live Well 300 (Homestead)
Wins	Top tens	Poles
0	2	0

NASCAR FedEx Freight Truck Series career
- 1 race run over 1 year
- Best finish: 127th (1997)
- First race: 1997 Hanes 250 (Martinsville)
Wins	Top tens	Poles
0	0	0
- Statistics up to date as of April 2, 2013.

Philip Morris (born May 11, 1965), nicknamed King Philip is an American former professional stock car racing driver from Ruckersville, Virginia. He is a five-time NASCAR Local Racing Series champion, tied with Larry Phillips for the most all-time.

Morris also previously competed in twelve races in what is now the NASCAR O'Reilly Auto Parts Series, finishing fifth in his debut in 1998, and one NASCAR Craftsman Truck Series race in 1997. He ran one CARS Tour race in 2017 and won the pole. He has also won the ValleyStar Credit Union 300 three times, the most of any driver.

== Racing career ==
=== Craftsman Truck Series ===
Morris made one career start in the Craftsman Truck Series, his major league NASCAR debut, which came in 1997. Starting 24th in the field at Martinsville, Morris had an engine let go early and would finish last in the 36-truck field.

=== Busch Series ===
Morris made his NASCAR Busch Series debut at the North Carolina Speedway in Rockingham, North Carolina in November 1998, driving the No. 84 Chevy. He started twelfth and finished in fifth.

In 1999, Morris made three races driving the No. 01 Blue Ridge Motorsports Chevrolet. At the Las Vegas Motor Speedway in March, he started in eighth and finished 35th, three laps down. At South Boston Speedway in June, Morris started 26th and finished seventh. In August, he made his third and final start of 1999 at Bristol, starting 28th and finishing 29th.

In 2000, Morris drove six races for Innovative Motorsports in the No. 30 Little Trees Chevrolet. In his six starts, he had a best starting position of eighth at South Boston and a best finish of 28th at South Boston, as well.

Morris did not have much success after that, and in 2001 raced his three last NASCAR races. He was 30th and 34th in two races for Jay Robinson Racing, with the better coming at Charlotte and then 40th in a race for Hensley Racing at Rockingham. He is often referred to as one of the greatest late model drivers to have existed, with the general consensus being that his name was what stopped him from breaking into the top levels of stock car racing. At the time, NASCAR's top series was sponsored by Winston, owned by R. J. Reynolds Tobacco Company, a competitor of Philip Morris International, which owns brands such as Marlboro. There was never evidence of any connection between the driver and the company.

== Motorsports results ==
=== NASCAR ===
(key) (Bold – Pole position awarded by qualifying time. Italics – Pole position earned by points standings or practice time. * – Most laps led.)

==== Busch Series ====
NASCAR Busch Series results
Year	Team	No.	Make	1	2	3	4	5	6	7	8	9	10	11	12	13	14	15	16	17	18	19	20	21	22	23	24	25	26	27	28	29	30	31	32	33	NBSC	Pts	Ref
1998	Blue Ridge Motorsports	84	Chevy	DAY	CAR	LVS	NSV	DAR	BRI	TEX	HCY	TAL	NHA	NZH	CLT	DOV	RCH	PPR	GLN	MLW	MYB	CAL	SBO	IRP	MCH	BRI	DAR	RCH	DOV	CLT	GTY	CAR; 5	ATL	HOM; DNQ			82nd	160	
1999	Blue Ridge Motorsports	01	Chevy	DAY	CAR; DNQ	LVS; 35	ATL	DAR	TEX; DNQ	NSV	BRI	TAL	CAL	NHA	RCH; DNQ	NZH	CLT; DNQ	DOV	SBO; 7	GLN	MLW	MYB; DNQ	PPR	GTY	IRP	MCH	BRI; 28	DAR	RCH; DNQ	DOV	CLT	CAR; DNQ	MEM	PHO	HOM		79th	183	
2000	Innovative Motorsports	30	Chevy	DAY	CAR	LVS	ATL	DAR	BRI	TEX	NSV; DNQ	TAL	CAL	RCH	NHA	CLT	DOV	SBO; 28	MYB; 36	GLN	MLW	NZH	PPR	GTY	IRP	MCH	BRI; 40	DAR	RCH; 42	DOV	CLT; 32	CAR	MEM	PHO	HOM		74th	286	
2001	Jay Robinson Racing	49	Ford	DAY	CAR	LVS	ATL	DAR	BRI	TEX	NSH	TAL	CAL	RCH	NHA	NZH	CLT	DOV	KEN	MLW	GLN	CHI	GTY	PPR	IRP	MCH	BRI	DAR	RCH	DOV	KAN	CLT; 30	MEM	PHO			85th	177	
2001	Hensley Motorsports	80	Ford																																CAR; 40		85th	177	
2001	Jay Robinson Racing	49	Chevy																																	HOM; 34	85th	177	

==== Craftsman Truck Series ====
NASCAR Craftsman Truck Series results
Year	Team	No.	Make	1	2	3	4	5	6	7	8	9	10	11	12	13	14	15	16	17	18	19	20	21	22	23	24	25	26	NCTSC	Pts	Ref
1997	Sam Beatty	81	Chevy	WDW	TUS	HOM	PHO	POR	EVG	I70	NHA	TEX	BRI	NZH	MLW	LVL	CNS	HPT	IRP	FLM	NSV	GLN	RCH; DNQ	MAR; 36	SON	MMR	CAL	PHO	LVS	127th	65	

=== CARS Late Model Stock Car Tour ===
(key) (Bold – Pole position awarded by qualifying time. Italics – Pole position earned by points standings or practice time. * – Most laps led. ** – All laps led.)

CARS Late Model Stock Car Tour results
Year	Team	No.	Make	1	2	3	4	5	6	7	8	9	10	11	12	13	CLMSCTC	Pts	Ref
2017	Adam Murray	01	Ford	CON	DOM	DOM	HCY	HCY	BRI	AND	ROU	TCM	ROU	HCY	CON	**SBO**; 16	53rd	19	
