= Advance Auto Parts 500 =

There have been two different NASCAR races known as the Advance Auto Parts 500:

- Advance Auto 500, a Busch Series race at Martinsville Speedway in 1993
- The 200 lap Late Model part of the meet in 1993
- Goody's Fast Relief 500, a NEXTEL Cup Series race at Martinsville Speedway from 2004 to 2005
