= Dexter Canipe =

American racing driver (born 1960)

- Born: May 29, 1960 (age 66); Claremont, North Carolina, U.S.
- Achievements: 1997 NASCAR Weekly Series Champion; 1998 Taco Bell 300 winner

NASCAR O'Reilly Auto Parts Series career
- Best finish: ? (1987)
Wins	Top tens	Poles
0	0	0

Dexter Canipe (born May 29, 1960) is an American racing driver who won the NASCAR Weekly Series national championship in 1997. He also won the 1998 Taco Bell 300 at Martinsville Speedway, the biggest race of the year in Late Model Stock Car racing.

Driving a Late Model Stock Car owned by Dwight Huffman and fielded by G&G Motorsports, Canipe won seventeen of the 22 races that he entered at Greenville-Pickens Speedway in South Carolina, in his national championship title in the NASCAR Weekly Series in 1997.

Canipe also won the first-ever NASCAR touring series race at Homestead-Miami Speedway when the track opened in 1995, a NASCAR Goody's Dash Series event that preceded the track's Truck series exhibition and Busch series season finale the same weekend.

Canipe attempted one race in NASCAR Busch Series, in 1987, but failed to qualify.

Canipe also competed in seven Hooters Pro Cup Series events between 1999 and 2000. His best finish was tenth at USA International Speedway.

== Motorsports career results ==
=== NASCAR ===
(key) (Bold – Pole position awarded by qualifying time. Italics – Pole position earned by points standings or practice time. * – Most laps led.)

==== Busch Series ====
NASCAR Busch Grand National Series results
Year	Team	No.	Make	1	2	3	4	5	6	7	8	9	10	11	12	13	14	15	16	17	18	19	20	21	22	23	24	25	26	27	NBGNSC	Pts
1987	Info not available	95	Buick	DAY	HCY	MAR	DAR	BRI	LGY	SBO	CLT	DOV	IRP; DNQ	ROU	JFC	OXF	SBO	HCY	RAL	LGY	ROU	BRI	JFC	DAR	RCH	DOV	MAR	CLT	CAR	MAR	N/A	-
