= ValleyStar Credit Union 300 =

Annual late model stock car race

- Venue: Martinsville Speedway
- Corporate sponsor: ValleyStar Credit Union
- First race: 1970 (Late Model Sportsman); 1985 (current Late Model format)
- Distance: 105.2 miles (169.27 km)
- Laps: 200; Stages 1/2: 65 each Final stage: 70
- Previous names: Martinsville DuPont Credit Union 300; Virginia is for Racing Lovers 300; Bailey's 300; Taco Bell 300; Advance Auto 500; Winston Classic; Winn-Dixie 500; Cardinal 500

The ValleyStar Credit Union 300 is a late model race held at Martinsville Speedway in the early fall each year since 1985.

The race is commonly referred to as the "Daytona 500" of Late Model Stock racing.

Since 2012, The race has been the final race of the Virginia Late Model Stock Triple Crown, following the Hampton Heat 200 at Langley Speedway and the Thunder Road Harley-Davidson 200 at South Boston Speedway. The Triple Crown wasn't awarded in 2016 (Due to Langley Speedway's brief closure) and 2020 (due to the COVID-19 pandemic).

== History ==
In 1970, Martinsville Speedway added 250-lap twin features for the Late Model Sportsman and Modified classes annually. At the time, neither division used a touring format. The doubleheader took a drastic change from 1982 until 1985 when NASCAR began turning lower divisions of racing into a touring format to reduce costs by racing one single tour. The Late Model Sportsman race was changed to what is now the NASCAR Xfinity Series in 1982, and the Modified race was adopted into the NASCAR Whelen Modified Tour in 1985. As the touring formats were adopted fully for the 1985 season, Martinsville Speedway cut the two races from 250 laps to 200 laps in 1985, and returned the local Late Models to the schedule in 1985, adding a 100-lap Late Model feature to the race weekend. After the Modifieds were dropped in 1993, the race expanded to its present 200-lap feature race. After what is now the O'Reilly Auto Parts Series was dropped after the 1994 season, the current Late Model format was adopted in 1995. The spring race was dropped after the 1997 season.

The race is 300 laps in total length, consisting of three 25 lap heat races, a 25 lap last chance qualifier and a 200 lap feature race. Qualifying takes place the Friday before the race and sets the field for the heat races. The top two drivers in qualifying advance to the feature, and do not race in the heat races. The top ten finishers in each of three heat races advance to the feature, while other drivers race in the last chance race. The top ten finishers in the last chance race advance to the feature. The race format was changed in 2012 and tweaked in 2013 and again in 2014. The original race format called for traditional time trial qualifying on Saturday to set the top 22 positions while the remaining 20 positions were determined by four heat races.

The finishes to the 2013 and 2014 editions were marred by officiating decisions regarding the leader's ability to choose when to restart the field.

After numerous incidents in recent years with darkness, the track added lights for the 2017 race, being held in late September, which prior to 2000 was the NASCAR Cup date, which now is on the traditional final weekend of October that the Late Model race was held for many years. The prize for the race winner is $25,000 and the track's traditional grandfather clock trophy. For the 2019 edition, cars would be allowed to use duplicate numbers after not being able to do so in the past as the track's scoreboard and timing and scoring system allows them to have alphanumeric numbers (12P, 5P, for example, car numbers carry the first letter of the driver's surname). The qualifying format was also changed to setting the Top 20 cars on Friday and then two 50-lap heat races. The top ten drivers in each heat advance. The feature race would have cautions at Lap 75 and 150, but if a caution is called for an incident beforehand, that became the pre-planned caution break. There was also no limit to the number of attempts to finish a race under a green flag.

In 2019, Josh Berry claimed his first 300 win, leading all 200 laps in his JR Motorsports entry. COVID-19, however, forced the cancellation of the event, with race tracks in Virginia still under quarantine restrictions. With restrictions eased in 2021, the race returned, with 16-year old Landon Pembelton surprising the field to claim the checkered flag.

== Cars and drivers ==
Drivers must hold a NASCAR License for the Whelen All-American Series. Cars must conform to the NASCAR Late Model Stock Car rule book and race on 10 inch wide Hoosier racing slicks.

These cars use a Perimeter Chassis, where the frame rails follow the outer perimeter of the body, being symmetrical from the centerline of the frame. This chassis is generally used in limited late model and spec late model competition. Late Model Stock Cars (LMSC) are distinctly different from Super Late Models (SLM), where the passenger side is considerably higher than the driver side (also called an Offset Chassis) using what is called an "Approved Body Configuration" body, such as the Snowball Derby, Winchester 400, and other similar races. LMSC are raced mostly in the South East region of the United States, including Virginia, Tennessee, and the Carolinas, and the CARS Late Model Stock Tour being events that use this type of car.

== Winners ==
Winners
Year	Driver	Car #
2026	Caden Kvapil	88
2025	Landon Pembelton	0
2024	Carson Kvapil	8
2023	Trevor Ward	77
2022	Peyton Sellers	26
2021	Landon Pembelton	0
2020	Not held (Commonwealth restrictions)	
2019	Josh Berry	88
2018	C. E. Falk III	02
2017	Timothy Peters	12
2016	Mike Looney	87
2015	Tommy Lemons Jr.	27
2014	Lee Pulliam	5
2013	Tommy Lemons Jr.	27
2012	Philip Morris	26
2011	Lee Pulliam	1
2010	Philip Morris	26
2009	Jake Crum	1
2008	Jason York	18
2007	Dennis Setzer	22
2006	Alex Yontz	55
2005	Timothy Peters	77
2004	Tony McGuire	4
2003	Jamey Caudill	2
2002	Frank Deiny Jr.	4
2001	Phil Warren	16
2000	Philip Morris	01
1999	Robert Powell	56
1998	Dexter Canipe	5
1997	Billy Hogan	7
1996	B. A. Wilson	81
1995	Tony McGuire	22
1994	Barry Beggarly	82
1993	Mike Skinner	5
1992	Joe Gaita	83
1991	Curtis Markham	4
1990	Wayne Patterson	14
1989	Curtis Markham	4
1988	Phil Warren	47
1987	Mark Martin	2
1986	Ed Johnson	57
1985	Barry Beggarly	82

== Virginia Triple Crown Champions ==
Year	Champion
2012	C.E. Falk III
2013	Peyton Sellers
2014	Peyton Sellers (2)
2015	Lee Pulliam
2016	n/a
2017	Timothy Peters
2018	Peyton Sellers (3)
2019	Lee Pulliam (2)
2020	n/a
2021	Bobby McCarty
2022	Peyton Sellers (4)
2023	Trevor Ward
2024	Peyton Sellers (5)
2025	Connor Hall
2026	Caden Kvapil
