= Caden Kvapil =

American racing driver (born 2006)

- Born: Caden Wade Kvapil; December 10, 2006 (age 19); Mooresville, North Carolina, U.S.
- Achievements: 2023 CARS Pro Late Model Tour Champion; 2026 CARS Late Model Stock Tour Champion; 2026 Hampton Heat Winner; 2026 ValleyStar Credit Union 300 Winner; 2026 Virginia Triple Crown Champion

NASCAR FedEx Freight Truck Series career
- 1 race run over 1 year
- 2026 position: 92nd
- Best finish: 92nd (2026)
- First race: 2026 UNOH 250 (Bristol)
Wins	Top tens	Poles
0	0	0

ARCA Menards Series career
- 1 race run over 1 year
- Best finish: 84th (2026)
- First race: 2026 Owens Corning 200 (Toledo)
Wins	Top tens	Poles
0	1	0

ARCA Menards Series East career
- 1 race run over 1 year
- Best finish: 48th (2026)
- First race: 2026 Owens Corning 200 (Toledo)
Wins	Top tens	Poles
0	1	0

CARS Late Model Stock Car Tour career
- Debut season: 2024
- Years active: 2024–present
- Starts: 22
- Championships: 0
- Wins: 5
- Poles: 0
- Best finish: 1st in 2026
- Statistics up to date as of November 6, 2026.

Caden Wade Kvapil (born December 10, 2006) is an American professional stock car racing driver. He competes in the zMAX CARS Tour, driving the No. 88 Chevrolet for JR Motorsports. He has previously competed in the NASCAR Craftsman Truck Series and the ARCA Menards Series East.

Kvapil is the son of 2003 NASCAR Craftsman Truck Series champion Travis Kvapil and younger brother of NASCAR O'Reilly Auto Parts Series driver Carson Kvapil.

== Racing career ==
Kvapil has also competed in series such as the Carolina Pro Late Model Series and the ASA STARS National Tour.

In 2022, Kvapil ran the full schedule in the CARS Pro Late Model Tour, driving the No. 35 Chevrolet for Travis Kvapil Racing. He won two races at the season opening race at Caraway Speedway and Ace Speedway, and finished within the top-ten in every race on his way to finish second in the final points standings, twelve points behind Luke Fenhaus.

In 2023, Kvapil moved to Highlands Motorsports and the No. 96 Chevrolet for the 2023 season. He earned three wins at Caraway Speedway, and Tri-County Motor Speedway at August and October, and went on to win the Pro Late Model championship by 56 points ahead of Katie Hettinger. Kvapil then moved back to Travis Kvapil Racing for the following year, where he won two races at Ace Speedway in May and August, and finished third in the final points standings. It was also during this year that he made his debut in the Late Model Stock division, driving the No. 8 Chevrolet at Ace Speedway and Wake County Speedway, finishing third and seventeenth, respectively.

In 2025, Kvapil made his debut in the Late Model Stock Tour, where he ran in select races for JR Motorsports and Go Fas Racing. He got his first win in a LMSC at the season ending race at North Wilkesboro Speedway. He later won the Charlie Powell Memorial at Florence Motor Speedway in November with his brother Carson finishing in second.

In 2026, Kvapil would be tabbed as the full-time driver of the No. 88 for JR Motorsports in LMSC, including the CARS Late Model Stock Tour. He won four races and won the championship with one race remaining after his win at Newport Speedway. During this time, he won the Virginia Triple Crown by virtue of winning the Hampton Heat at Langley Speedway and the ValleyStar Credit Union 300 at Martinsville Speedway.

=== ARCA Menards Series ===
In May 2026, it was revealed that Kvapil would make his debut in the ARCA Menards Series at Toledo Speedway, driving the No. 24 Chevrolet for SPS Racing. As it is a combination race with the ARCA Menards Series East, it would also serve as his debut in that series as well. He started in ninth and finished in fifth.

=== NASCAR Craftsman Truck Series ===
On September 9, 2026, it was announced that Kvapil would make his debut in the NASCAR Craftsman Truck Series at Bristol Motor Speedway, driving the No. 76 Chevrolet for Freedom Racing Enterprises.

== Motorsports career results ==
=== Stock car career summary ===
Season	Series	Team	Races	Wins	Top 5	Top 10	Points	Position
2022	CARS Pro Late Model Tour	Travis Kvapil Racing	12	2	8	12	354	**2nd**
2023	ASA STARS National Tour	Travis Kvapil Racing	1	0	0	1	109	35th
2023	ASA STARS National Tour	Go Fas Racing	1	0	1	1	109	35th
2023	CARS Pro Late Model Tour	Highlands Motorsports	13	3	8	11	391	**1st**
2024	ASA STARS National Tour	Go Fas Racing	5	0	2	2	259	13th
2024	CARS Pro Late Model Tour	Travis Kvapil Racing	13	2	7	10	350	**3rd**
2024	CARS Late Model Stock Car Tour	JR Motorsports	2	0	1	1	0	N/A
2025	ASA STARS National Tour	Go Fas Racing	3	0	0	2	142	26th
2025	CARS Pro Late Model Tour	JR Motorsports	1	0	1	1	78	25th
2025	CARS Pro Late Model Tour	Go Fas Racing	1	0	1	1	78	25th
2025	CARS Late Model Stock Car Tour	JR Motorsports	5	1	1	4	186	23rd
2025	CARS Late Model Stock Car Tour	Go Fas Racing	1	0	0	0	186	23rd
2026	ASA STARS National Tour	Go Fas Racing	1	1	1	1	78*	40th*
2026	CARS Late Model Stock Car Tour	JR Motorsports	14	4	10	13	553	**1st**
2026	ARCA Menards Series East	SPS Racing	1	0	1	1	39	48th
2026	ARCA Menards Series	SPS Racing	1	0	1	1	39	84th
2026	NASCAR Craftsman Truck Series	Freedom Racing Enterprises	1	0	0	0	2	92nd

=== NASCAR ===
(key) (Bold – Pole position awarded by qualifying time. Italics – Pole position earned by points standings or practice time. * – Most laps led. ** – All laps led.)

==== Craftsman Truck Series ====
NASCAR Craftsman Truck Series results
Year	Team	No.	Make	1	2	3	4	5	6	7	8	9	10	11	12	13	14	15	16	17	18	19	20	21	22	23	24	25	NCTSC	Pts	Ref
2026	Freedom Racing Enterprises	76	Chevy	DAY	ATL	STP	DAR	ROC	BRI	TEX	GLN	DOV	CLT	NSH	MCH	COR	LRP	NWS	IRP	RCH	NHA	BRI; 35	KAN	CLT	PHO	TAL	MAR	HOM	92nd	2	

=== ARCA Menards Series ===
(key) (Bold – Pole position awarded by qualifying time. Italics – Pole position earned by points standings or practice time. * – Most laps led. ** – All laps led.)

ARCA Menards Series results
Year	Team	No.	Make	1	2	3	4	5	6	7	8	9	10	11	12	13	14	15	16	17	18	19	20	AMSC	Pts	Ref
2026	SPS Racing	24	Chevy	DAY	PHO	KAN	TAL	GLN	TOL; 5	MCH	POC	BER	ELK	CHI	LRP	IRP	IOW	ISF	MAD	DSF	SLM	BRI	KAN	84th	39	

==== ARCA Menards Series East ====
ARCA Menards Series East results
Year	Team	No.	Make	1	2	3	4	5	6	7	8	AMSEC	Pts	Ref
2026	SPS Racing	24	Chevy	HCY	CAR	NSV	TOL; 5	IRP	FRS	IOW	BRI	48th	39	

=== CARS Late Model Stock Car Tour ===
(key) (Bold – Pole position awarded by qualifying time. Italics – Pole position earned by points standings or practice time. * – Most laps led. ** – All laps led.)

CARS Late Model Stock Car Tour results
Year	Team	No.	Make	1	2	3	4	5	6	7	8	9	10	11	12	13	14	15	16	17	CLMSCTC	Pts	Ref
2024	JR Motorsports	8K	Chevy	SNM	HCY	AAS	OCS	ACE	TCM	LGY	DOM	CRW	HCY	NWS	ACE; 3						N/A	0	
2024	JR Motorsports	8	Chevy													WCS; 17	FLC	SBO	TCM	NWS	N/A	0	
2025	JR Motorsports	8	Chevy	AAS; 6	WCS	CDL	OCS	ACE; 7	NWS; 27	LGY			HCY; 7	AND	FLC	SBO	TCM	NWS; 1			23rd	186	
2025	Go Fas Racing	32	Chevy								DOM; 23	CRW									23rd	186	
2026	JR Motorsports	88	Chevy	SNM; 1	WCS; 8	NSV; 1	CRW; 3	ACE; 3	LGY; 3	DOM; 6	NWS; 12	HCY; 8	AND; 5	FLC; 1*	TCM; 3	NPS; 1	SBO; 2*				1st	553	

=== CARS Pro Late Model Tour ===
(key)

CARS Pro Late Model Tour results
Year	Team	No.	Make	1	2	3	4	5	6	7	8	9	10	11	12	13	CPLMTC	Pts	Ref
2022	Travis Kvapil Racing	35	Chevy	CRW; 1	HCY; 2	GPS; 2	FCS; 7	TCM; 5	HCY; 9	ACE; 7	MMS; 3	TCM; 4	ACE; 1	SBO; 6	**CRW**; 2*		2nd	354	
2023	Highlands Motorsports	96	Chevy	SNM; 8	HCY; 11	**ACE**; 2*	NWS; 8	TCM; 3	DIL; 12	CRW; 1*	**WKS**; 7*	HCY; 2	**TCM**; 1*	SBO; 3	TCM; 1	**CRW**; 2*	1st	391	
2024	Travis Kvapil Racing	35	Chevy	SNM; 5	HCY; 14	OCS; 10	**ACE**; 1**	TCM; 14	CRW; 3	**HCY**; 4	NWS; 7	ACE; 1	FLC; 14	SBO; 3	TCM; 3	NWS; 11	3rd	350	
2025	JR Motorsports	8	Chevy	AAS	CDL	OCS	ACE	NWS	CRW	HCY; 2							25th	78	
2025	Go Fas Racing	32	Chevy								HCY; 4	AND	FLC	SBO	TCM	NWS	25th	78	

=== ASA STARS National Tour ===
(key) (Bold – Pole position awarded by qualifying time. Italics – Pole position earned by points standings or practice time. * – Most laps led. ** – All laps led.)

ASA STARS National Tour results
Year	Team	No.	Make	1	2	3	4	5	6	7	8	9	10	11	12	ASNTC	Pts	Ref
2023	Travis Kvapil Racing	35	Chevy	FIF	MAD	NWS; 6										35th	109	
2023	Go Fas Racing	32	Chevy				HCY; 5	MLW	AND	WIR	TOL	WIN	NSV			35th	109	
2024	Go Fas Racing	32K	Chevy	NSM; DNQ												13th	259	
2024	Go Fas Racing	32	Chevy		FIF; 24	HCY; 22	MAD; 4	MLW; 5	AND; 12	OWO	TOL	WIN	NSV			13th	259	
2025	Go Fas Racing	32	Chevy	NSM	FIF	DOM; 6	HCY; 20	NPS	MAD	SLG	AND	OWO	TOL; 8	WIN	NSV	26th	142	
2026	Go Fas Racing	32	Chevy	NSM	FIF	HCY; 1	SLG	MAD	NPS	OWO	TRI	WIN	NSV	NSM		-*	-*	
