= C. E. Falk =

American stock car racing driver

C. E. Falk III
- Born: November 5, 1987 (age 39); Virginia Beach, Virginia, U.S.
- Achievements: 2012 Virginia Triple Crown Champion (inaugural season); 2018 ValleyStar Credit Union 300 Winner; 2010, 2011, 2014 Hampton Heat 200 Winner; 2010 Denny Hamlin Short Track Showdown Winner; 2009, 2010, 2011, 2013 Langley Speedway Track Champion

NASCAR FedEx Freight Truck Series career
- 5 races run over 2 years
- 2012 position: 47th
- Best finish: 47th (2012)
- First race: 2010 Kroger 200 (Martinsville)
- Last race: 2012 Pocono Mountains 125 (Pocono)
Wins	Top tens	Poles
0	0	0
- Statistics up to date as of November 17, 2012.

C. E. Falk III (born November 5, 1987) is an American professional stock car racing driver. Son of former NASCAR competitor Eddie Falk and nephew of current team owner Joe Falk, he currently competes regularly at the famed Langley Speedway. He married Kaliegh Rey Shidler on New Year's Eve in 2014.

== Career ==
=== Short tracks ===
A native of Virginia's Hampton Roads region and a graduate of the University of North Carolina at Charlotte, Falk began his professional racing career in 2006 in the Hooters Pro Cup Series; he ran six races with a best finish of eleventh at Montgomery Motor Speedway. Moving full-time to short track competition at Langley Speedway in Virginia, Falk soon established himself at the track, becoming regarded as one of the best drivers ever to compete at the well-known facility. After a winless 2008, he won more than half the track's races on his way to the 2009 series championship.

Falk won the 2010 Denny Hamlin Short Track Showdown charity race at Southside Speedway, defeating an all-star field including Sprint Cup Series drivers Denny Hamlin, Tony Stewart, Kyle Busch and Bobby Labonte; Falk passed Hamlin on the final lap for the win, holding off a charging Stewart to take what Falk described it as the biggest win of his career. The win boosted Falk's stock among NASCAR team owners; later that year he would win his second Langley track championship, while in 2011 he would capture a third consecutive title.

Falk also competes at other Southeastern short tracks, being a regular at South Boston Speedway; in 2012, he broadened his racing to a variety of tracks in pursuit of the NASCAR Whelen All-American Series national short-track championship.

=== National touring series ===
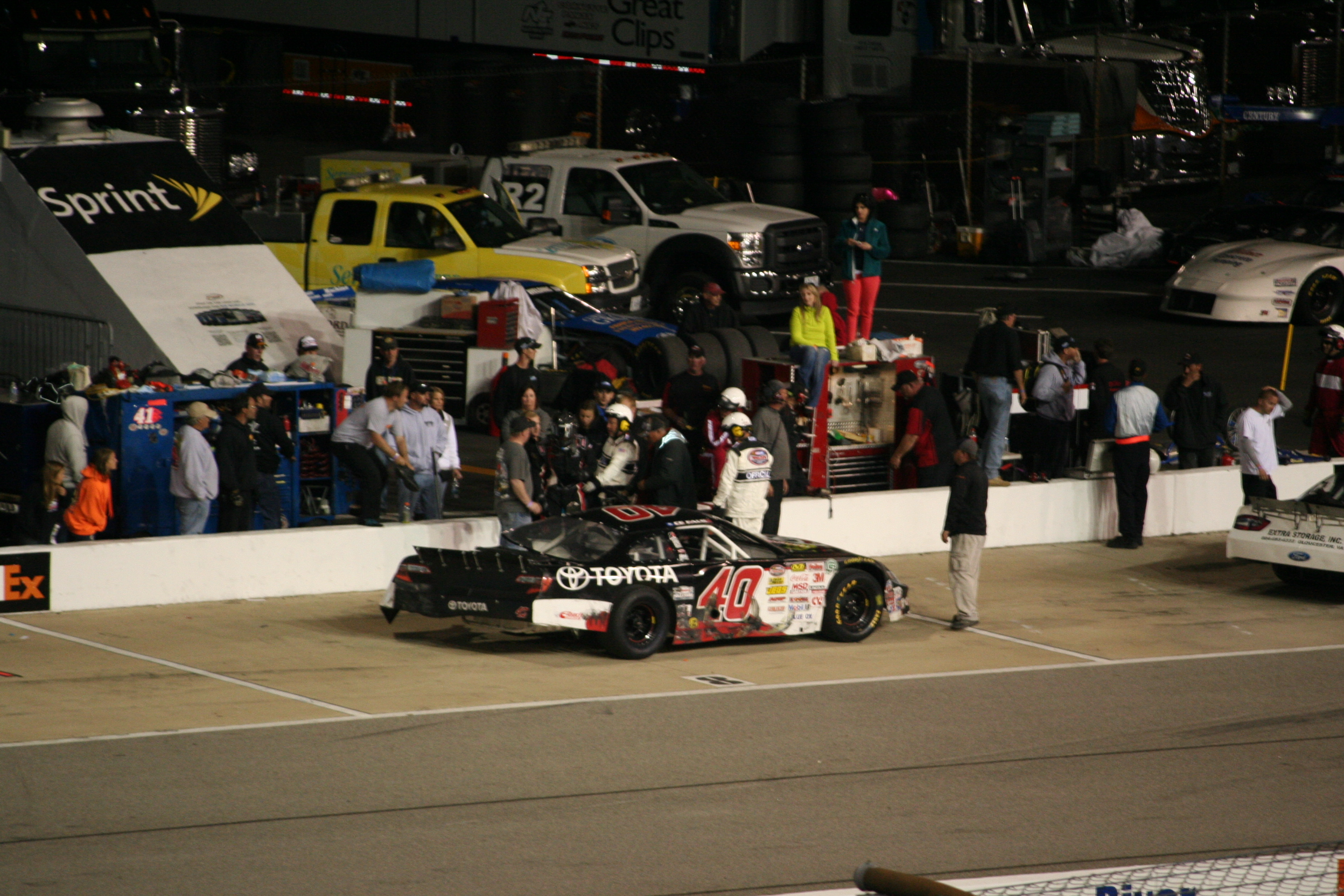
Falk's car after the 2013 Denny Hamlin Short Track Showdown

Falk made his debut in NASCAR's national touring series in 2010, competing in the Camping World Truck Series for two events. Driving for Rick Ware Racing, he made his debut at Martinsville Speedway; starting 30th, he finished 25th. In his second race in the series at Phoenix International Raceway, Falk started 26th and finished 28th.

In 2012, in addition to seeking a fourth consecutive Langley Speedway championship, an effort derailed by a pair of disqualifications over the course of the season, Falk sought to break into more regular NASCAR touring competition; when his uncle purchased the former Richard Childress Racing No. 33 Sprint Cup Series team, he stated that Falk would likely be among the drivers to compete in the car at some point during the 2012 season. In May, Falk was voted the top driver among NASCAR regional and touring series competitors; in late June, Falk joined Hillman Racing to drive the team's No. 27 truck at Kentucky Speedway in the Camping World Truck Series. Falk crashed his truck in practice for the event; borrowing a backup truck, he started and parked in the race, finishing 34th. Falk later ran races for the team at Chicagoland Speedway and Pocono Raceway, finishing 16th at the latter track.

In 2013, Falk competed in the inaugural UNOH Battle at the Beach at Daytona International Speedway, racing in the Whelen All-American Series portion of the event. Falk led 61 laps of the race before being wrecked by Kyle Larson for the win; he recovered to finish third, his performance attracting interest from teams in NASCAR's upper-level series.

== Motorsports career results ==
=== NASCAR ===
(key) (Bold – Pole position awarded by qualifying time. Italics – Pole position earned by points standings or practice time. * – Most laps led.)

==== Camping World Truck Series ====
NASCAR Camping World Truck Series results
Year	Team	No.	Make	1	2	3	4	5	6	7	8	9	10	11	12	13	14	15	16	17	18	19	20	21	22	23	24	25	NCWTC	Pts	Ref
2010	Rick Ware Racing	47	Chevy	DAY	ATL	MAR	NSH	KAN	DOV	CLT	TEX	MCH	IOW	GTY	IRP	POC	NSH	DAR	BRI	CHI	KEN	NHA	LVS	MAR; 25	TAL	TEX			79th	167	
2010	Rick Ware Racing	6	Chevy																								PHO; 28	HOM	79th	167	
2012	Hillman Racing	27	Chevy	DAY	MAR	CAR	KAN	CLT	DOV	TEX	KEN; 34	IOW	CHI; 29	POC; 16	MCH	BRI	ATL	IOW	KEN	LVS	TAL	MAR	TEX	PHO	HOM				47th	53	

=== CARS Late Model Stock Car Tour ===
(key) (Bold – Pole position awarded by qualifying time. Italics – Pole position earned by points standings or practice time. * – Most laps led. ** – All laps led.)

CARS Late Model Stock Car Tour results
Year	Team	No.	Make	1	2	3	4	5	6	7	8	9	10	11	12	13	CLMSCTC	Pts	Ref
2017	Eddie Falk	40	Ford	CON; 18	DOM	DOM	HCY	HCY	BRI	AND	ROU	TCM	ROU	HCY	CON	SBO	62nd	15	

* Season still in progress
^{1} Ineligible for series points

Achievements
Preceded by Kyle Busch	Denny Hamlin Short Track Showdown winner 2010	Succeeded by Denny Hamlin
