= Lee Pulliam =

American racing driver (born 1988)

- Pulliam in 2026
- Nationality: American
- Born: Robert Lee Pulliam; April 5, 1988 (age 38) Semora, North Carolina, U.S.

CARS Late Model Stock Tour career
- Debut season: 2018
- Current team: Lee Pulliam Performance; JR Motorsports
- Car number: 1/5; 8
- Engine: Chevrolet
- Starts: 18
- Wins: 2
- Poles: 2
- Best finish: 2nd in 2018
- Finished last season: 31st (2026)

Previous series
- 2011–2017 2014 2013: NASCAR Whelen All-American Series; NASCAR K&N Pro Series East; X-1R Pro Cup Series

Awards
- 2012, 2013, 2015, 2017 NASCAR Advance Auto Parts Weekly Series champion 2015, 2019 Virginia Triple Crown champion 2011, 2014 ValleyStar Credit Union 300 winner 2011, 2012, 2013, 2014, 2015, 2016 Thunder Road 200 winner 2015 Hampton Heat 200 winner

NASCAR O'Reilly Auto Parts Series career
- 4 races run over 1 year
- Car no., team: No. 87 (Peterson Racing)
- 2026 position: 35th
- Best finish: 35th (2026)
- First race: 2026 NFPA 250 (Martinsville)
- Last race: 2026 National Debt Relief 250 (Martinsville)
Wins	Top tens	Poles
0	1	0

ARCA Menards Series East career
- 6 races run over 1 year
- Best finish: 25th (2014)
- First race: 2014 New Smyrna 150 presented by JEGS (New Smyrna)
- Last race: 2014 Pensacola 150 (Pensacola)
Wins	Top tens	Poles
0	2	0
- Statistics up to date as of November 7, 2026.

Robert Lee Pulliam (born April 5, 1988) is an American professional stock car racing driver and team owner. He competes full-time in the NASCAR O'Reilly Auto Parts Series, driving the No. 87 Chevrolet Camaro SS for Peterson Racing.

Pulliam is a four-time NASCAR Whelen All-American Series Division I national champion, and is the owner of late model racing team Lee Pulliam Performance. He won the Thunder Road Harley-Davidson 200 a record six times, which he did so consecutively.

== Racing career ==
After graduating high school early and working as a diesel mechanic at Callands Repair in Callands, Virginia while in college to save money, Pulliam purchased his first race car in 2007. He raced his first season at South Boston Speedway and won Rookie of the Year in the Limited Sportsman class; he moved up to the late model class in 2011 and claimed 16 wins at Motor Mile Speedway. He also claimed his first ValleyStar Credit Union 300 win in 2011. A year later, Pulliam claimed his first NASCAR Whelen All-American Series championship. He won a second All-American championship in 2013.

In 2014, Pulliam agreed to a NASCAR K&N Pro Series East effort with Hattori Racing Enterprises. After a crash and two subpar runs, Pulliam was released from the team, and progress stalled on making NASCAR Nationwide Series starts with HRE. Another crash in his K&N debut with Top Gun Motorsports stalled plans on the K&N circuit, and Pulliam again focused on the All-American late models. Later in 2014, Pulliam claimed his second ValleyStar Credit Union 300 win. At the end of the season, Pulliam claimed the Virginia state and Motor Mile track championships in the All-American Series.

At the beginning of the 2015 season, South Boston named a section of its grandstands for Pulliam; he won a track championship there in 2013. At the Denny Hamlin Short Track Showdown, Pulliam was battling Timothy Peters for the win in the final set of corners when he was spun by Josh Berry, dropping Pulliam to tenth. Afterwards, Pulliam described Berry as "the biggest joke in racing". In the Whelen All-American Series, Pulliam claimed his third national championship that year. A spirited five-race weekend late in the year helped vault Pulliam to the title.

Pulliam mainly competed at Myrtle Beach Speedway in 2017, using that track as the backbone of his fourth All-American Series championship. Trevor Huddleston made a late charge on the championship, but Pulliam stayed ahead in the final point standings. The following year, Pulliam did not chase the All-American championship but instead focused on CARS Tour events. He claimed a win in that series at Bristol Motor Speedway in May.

Before the 2019 season, Pulliam switched chassis from one built around 2010 to a new one acquired in the offseason, and announced his intentions to run for the late model championship at South Boston. and In a race at South Boston, Pulliam and Phillip Morris made contact, resulting in a red flag. Morris' crew chief tried to climb into Pulliam's car, but Pulliam accelerated and ejected the crew member from the car. For the incident, Pulliam was suspended from NASCAR-sanctioned events for two weeks, fined $1,500, and placed on probation until the end of the calendar year. During the suspension, Pulliam made a one-off return to the CARS Tour and won the Old State Nationals. Later in the year, Pulliam claimed the Virginia Triple Crown of late model stock car racing, winning the title by one position over Peyton Sellers.

Pulliam would only make two starts after 2019, once in 2024 and the other in 2025, both coming in the ValleyStar Credit Union 300 at Martinsville Speedway.

Pulliam announced on January 26, 2026, that he would run the first two races of the 2026 CARS Tour at Coastal Plains Speedway and Southern National Motorsports Park, as well as the Icebreaker at Florence Motor Speedway and the opening race at South Boston Speedway.

=== O'Reilly Auto Parts Series ===
Pulliam's No. 87 car at Las Vegas Motor Speedway in 2026.

On February 24, 2026, it was announced that Pulliam would attempt to make his debut in the NASCAR O'Reilly Auto Parts Series at Martinsville Speedway, driving the No. 9 Chevrolet for JR Motorsports. He would go on to finish fifth that race.

On August 25, 2026, it was announced that Pulliam will run full-time for Peterson Racing in the No. 87 Chevrolet for the 2027 season.

== Lee Pulliam Performance ==
Lee Pulliam Performance
- Owner: Lee Pulliam
- Series: CARS Late Model Stock Tour
- Race drivers: Late Models: 5B. Carson Brown
- Manufacturer: Chevrolet
- Opened: 2018

Lee Pulliam Performance is an American professional stock car racing team that currently competes in the CARS Late Model Stock Tour, they field the No. 5B Chevrolet full-time for Carson Brown.

The team was founded in 2018 following Pulliam's exit from full-time racing and has developed many drivers in the CARS Tour and Late Models. The team has been used for many TD2 drivers' development, such as Corey Heim and Isabella Robusto. In 2024, Brenden Queen won the team's first CARS Late Model Stock Tour championship.

== Personal life ==
Pulliam is married with a daughter. He lives in Alton, Virginia.

== Motorsports career results ==
=== Stock car career summary ===
Season	Series	Team	Races	Wins	Top 5	Top 10	Points	Position
2014	NASCAR K&N Pro Series East	Hattori Racing Enterprises	5	0	2	2	165	25th
2014	NASCAR K&N Pro Series East	Top Gun Motorsports	1	0	0	0	165	25th
2018	CARS Late Model Stock Car Tour	Lee Pulliam Performance	2	1	1	1	344	**2nd**
2018	CARS Late Model Stock Car Tour	Eddie Kiker	12	1	8	10	344	**2nd**
2019	CARS Late Model Stock Car Tour	Eddie Kiker	1	1	1	1	34	38th
2020	CARS Late Model Stock Car Tour	Lee Pulliam Performance	1	0	1	1	29	38th
2026	CARS Late Model Stock Car Tour	Lee Pulliam Performance	3	0	1	2	126	31st
2026	CARS Late Model Stock Car Tour	JR Motorsports	1	0	0	0	126	31st
2026	NASCAR O'Reilly Auto Parts Series	JR Motorsports	1	0	1	1	89	35th
2026	NASCAR O'Reilly Auto Parts Series	Peterson Racing	3	0	0	0	89	35th

=== NASCAR ===
(key) (Bold – Pole position awarded by qualifying time. Italics – Pole position earned by points standings or practice time. * – Most laps led.)

==== O'Reilly Auto Parts Series ====
NASCAR O'Reilly Auto Parts Series results
Year	Team	No.	Make	1	2	3	4	5	6	7	8	9	10	11	12	13	14	15	16	17	18	19	20	21	22	23	24	25	26	27	28	29	30	31	32	33	NOAPSC	Pts	Ref
2026	JR Motorsports	9	Chevy	DAY	ATL	COA	PHO	LVS	DAR	MAR; 5	CAR	BRI	KAN	TAL	TEX	GLN	DOV	CLT	NSH	POC	COR	SON	CHI	ATL	IND	IOW	DAY	DAR	GTW	BRI							35th	89	
2026	Peterson Racing	87	Chevy																												LVS; 18	CLT	PHO	TAL; 22	MAR; 14	HOM	35th	89	

==== K&N Pro Series East ====
NASCAR K&N Pro Series East results
Year	Team	No.	Make	1	2	3	4	5	6	7	8	9	10	11	12	13	14	15	16	NKNPSEC	Pts	Ref
2014	Hattori Racing Enterprises	11	Toyota	NSM; 5	DAY; 5	BRI; 31	GRE; 18	RCH; 21	IOW	BGS										25th	165	
2014	Top Gun Motorsports	51	Chevy								FIF; 19	LGY	NHA	COL	IOW	GLN	VIR	GRE	DOV	25th	165	

=== CARS Late Model Stock Car Tour ===
(key) (Bold – Pole position awarded by qualifying time. Italics – Pole position earned by points standings or practice time. * – Most laps led. ** – All laps led.)

CARS Late Model Stock Car Tour results
Year	Team	No.	Make	1	2	3	4	5	6	7	8	9	10	11	12	13	14	CLMSCTC	Pts	Ref
2018	Lee Pulliam Performance	5P	Chevy	TCM; 21	MYB; 1													2nd	344	
2018	Eddie Kiker	5P	Chevy			ROU; 4								ROU; 8				2nd	344	
2018	Eddie Kiker	5	Chevy				HCY; 4	**BRI**; 1*	ACE; 4	CCS; 9	KPT; 3	HCY; 2	WKS; 2		SBO; 3			2nd	344	
2019	Eddie Kiker	5	Chevy	SNM	HCY	ROU; 1	ACE	MMS	LGY	DOM	CCS	HCY	ROU	SBO				38th	34	
2020	Lee Pulliam Performance	2	Chevy	SNM	ACE	HCY	HCY	DOM	FCS	LGY	CCS	FLO; 4	GRE					38th	29	
2026	Lee Pulliam Performance	1	Chevy	**SNM**; 2*	WCS	NSV	CRW	ACE; 10	LGY	DOM	NWS							31st	126	
2026	Lee Pulliam Performance	5P	Chevy									HCY; 21	AND	FLC				31st	126	
2026	JR Motorsports	8	Chevy												TCM; 13	NPS	SBO	31st	126	
