= 2026 UNOH 250 =

NASCAR Craftsman Truck Series race at Bristol Motor Speedway

2026 UNOH 250 presented by Ohio Logistics
Race details
- Race 19 of 25 in the 2026 NASCAR Craftsman Truck Series
- Date: September 17, 2026
- Location: Bristol Motor Speedway, Bristol, Tennessee
- Course: Permanent racing facility
- Course length: 0.533 miles (0.858 km)
- Distance: 250 laps, 133.25 mi (214.445 km)
- Average speed: 85.295 miles per hour (137.269 km/h)

Pole position
| Driver | Layne Riggs | Front Row Motorsports |
- Grid positions set by competition-based formula

Most laps led
| Driver | Layne Riggs | Front Row Motorsports |
- Laps: 135

Fastest lap
| Driver | Layne Riggs | Front Row Motorsports |
- Time: 15.683

Winner
| No. 98 | Jake Garcia | Thorsport Racing |

Television in the United States
- Network: FS1
- Announcers: Brent Stover, Brad Keselowski and Joey Logano

Radio in the United States
- Radio: NRN
- Booth announcers: Brad Gillie and Nick Yeoman
- Turn announcers: Pat Patterson (Backstretch)

The 2026 UNOH 250 presented by Ohio Logistics was a NASCAR Craftsman Truck Series race held on Thursday, September 17, 2026, at Bristol Motor Speedway in Bristol, Tennessee. Contested over 250 laps on the 0.533-mile (0.858 km) concrete oval, it was the 19th race of the 2026 NASCAR Craftsman Truck Series season, the first race in the NASCAR Chase, and the 29th running of the event.

Jake Garcia, driving for ThorSport Racing, pulled off the Chase spoiler, dominating the final stage and leading 104 laps to earn his first career NASCAR Craftsman Truck Series win in his 94th start. Layne Riggs swept both stages and led a race-high 135 laps, before a series of issues took place in the final stage, including a loose wheel and an incident involving Nick Leitz, finishing 32nd, 16 laps down. At race's end, Bayley Currey finished second, and Stewart Friesen finished third. Justin Haley and Tristan McKee rounded out the top five, while Gio Ruggiero, William Sawalich, Kaden Honeycutt, Ty Majeski, and Grant Enfinger rounded out the top ten.

== Report ==
=== Background ===
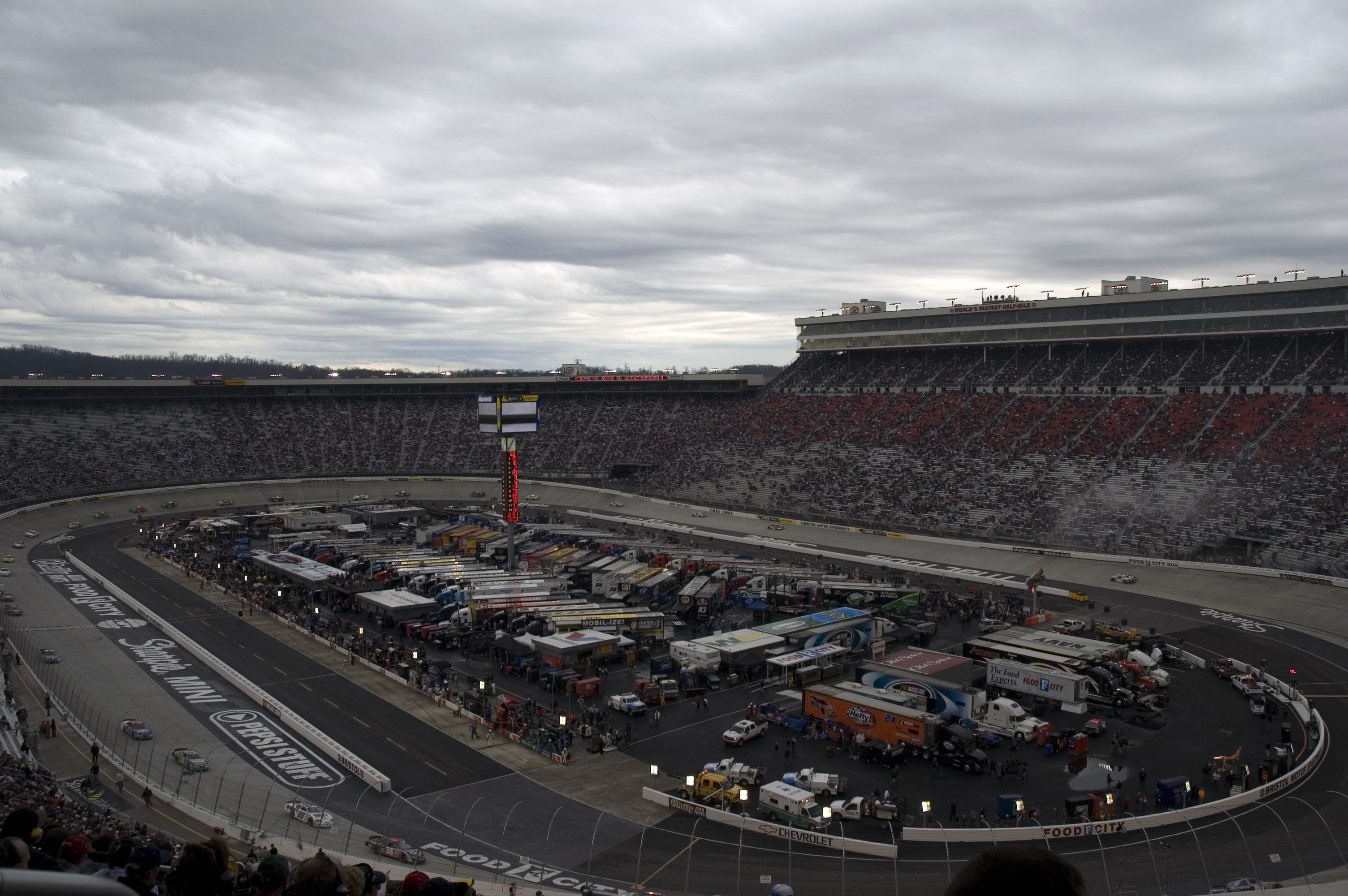
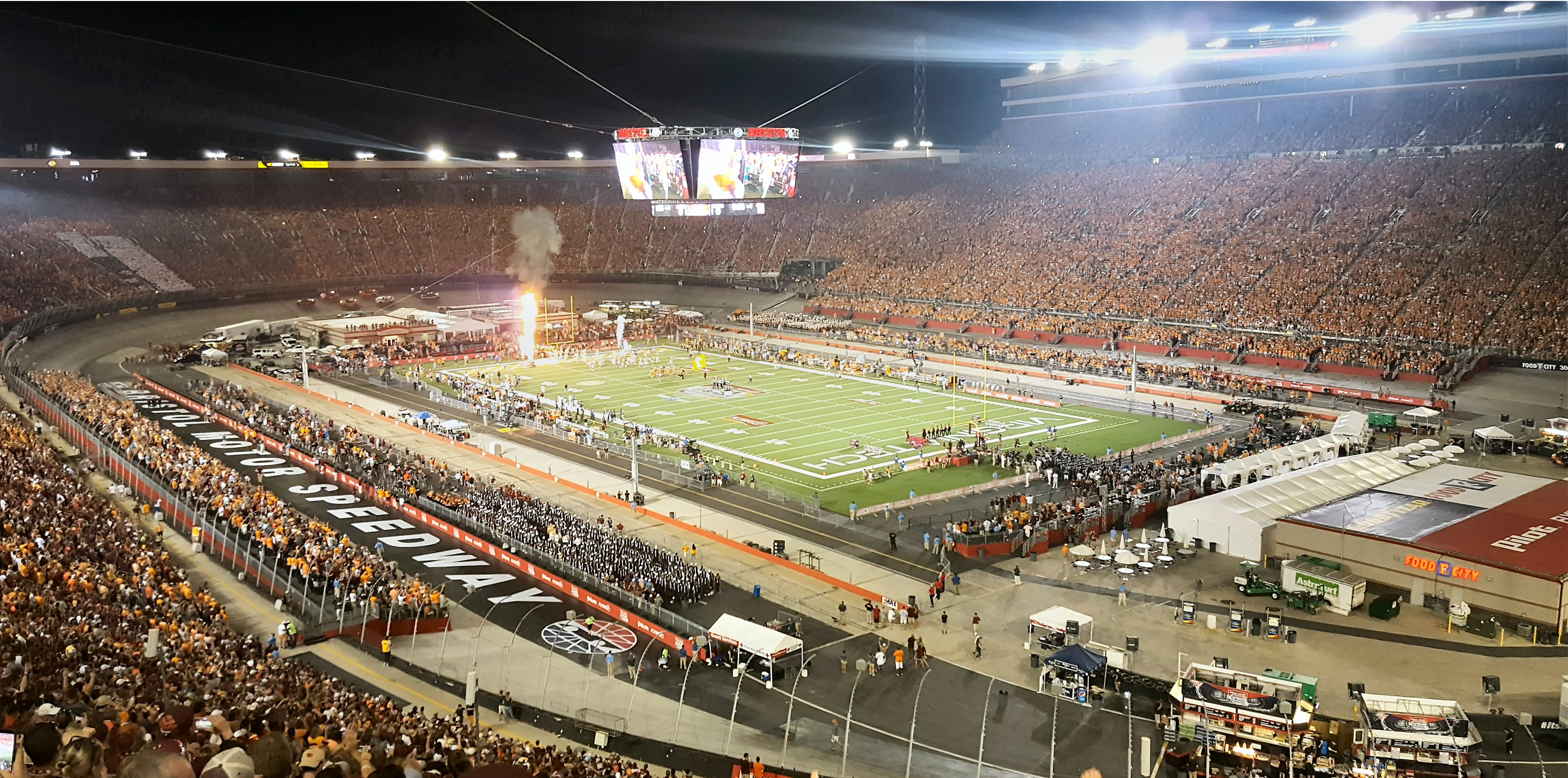
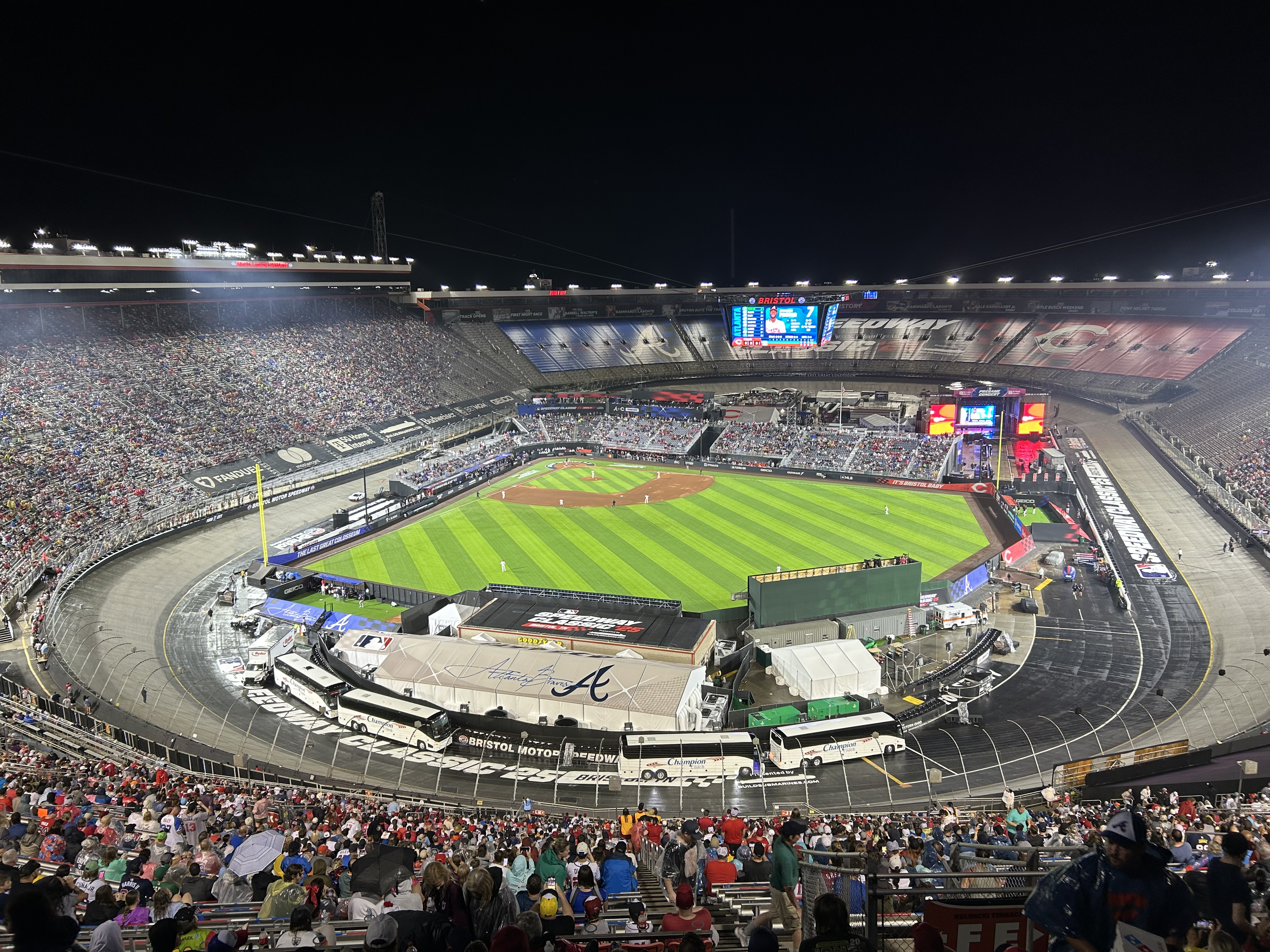
The Track (left) the Battle at Bristol (center) and the MLB Speedway Classic (right), are all events previously held at Bristol Motor Speedway.

The Bristol Motor Speedway, formerly known as Bristol International Raceway and Bristol Raceway, is a NASCAR short track venue located in Bristol, Tennessee. Constructed in 1960, it held its first NASCAR race on July 30, 1961. Despite its short length, Bristol is among the most popular tracks on the NASCAR schedule because of its distinct features, which include extraordinarily steep banking, an all concrete surface, two pit roads, and stadium-like seating. It has also been named one of the loudest NASCAR tracks.

Besides holding racing events, the track has hosted the Battle at Bristol, a college football game between the Tennessee Volunteers and Virginia Tech Hokies on September 10, 2016 and the MLB Speedway Classic, a MLB baseball game between the Atlanta Braves and the Cincinnati Reds from August 2-3, 2025.

==== Entry list ====
- (R) denotes rookie driver.
- (i) denotes driver who is ineligible for series driver points.
- (CC) denotes chase contender.
- (OC) denotes owners' chase contender truck.

| # | Driver | Team | Make |
|---|---|---|---|
| 1 | Nick Leitz (OC) | Tricon Garage | Toyota |
| 2 | Luke Baldwin | Team Reaume | Ford |
| 4 | Connor Hall | Niece Motorsports | Chevrolet |
| 5 | Bayley Currey | Tricon Garage | Toyota |
| 7 | Connor Mosack (OC) | Spire Motorsports | Chevrolet |
| 9 | Grant Enfinger (CC) | CR7 Motorsports | Chevrolet |
| 10 | Corey LaJoie | Kaulig Racing | Ram |
| 11 | Kaden Honeycutt (CC) | Tricon Garage | Toyota |
| 12 | Brenden Queen (R) | Kaulig Racing | Ram |
| 13 | Cole Butcher (R) | ThorSport Racing | Ford |
| 14 | Mini Tyrrell (R) | Kaulig Racing | Ram |
| 15 | Tanner Gray | Tricon Garage | Toyota |
| 16 | Justin Haley | Kaulig Racing | Ram |
| 17 | Gio Ruggiero (CC) | Tricon Garage | Toyota |
| 18 | Tyler Ankrum (CC) | McAnally–Hilgemann Racing | Chevrolet |
| 19 | Daniel Hemric (CC) | McAnally–Hilgemann Racing | Chevrolet |
| 22 | Jackson Macenko | Team Reaume | Ford |
| 25 | Regan Smith | Kaulig Racing | Ram |
| 26 | Dawson Sutton | Rackley W.A.R. | Chevrolet |
| 33 | Frankie Muniz | Team Reaume | Ford |
| 34 | Layne Riggs (CC) | Front Row Motorsports | Ford |
| 38 | Chandler Smith (CC) | Front Row Motorsports | Ford |
| 42 | Parker Eatmon | Niece Motorsports | Chevrolet |
| 44 | Andrés Pérez de Lara | Niece Motorsports | Chevrolet |
| 45 | Landen Lewis (OC) | Niece Motorsports | Chevrolet |
| 52 | Stewart Friesen | Halmar Friesen Racing | Toyota |
| 56 | Timmy Hill | Hill Motorsports | Toyota |
| 62 | William Sawalich (i) | Halmar Friesen Racing | Toyota |
| 75 | Nick Sanchez | Henderson Motorsports | Chevrolet |
| 76 | Caden Kvapil | Freedom Racing Enterprises | Chevrolet |
| 77 | Tristan McKee (OC) | Spire Motorsports | Chevrolet |
| 81 | Kris Wright | McAnally–Hilgemann Racing | Chevrolet |
| 88 | Ty Majeski (CC) | ThorSport Racing | Ford |
| 90 | Justin Carroll | TC Motorsports | Toyota |
| 91 | Christian Eckes (CC) | McAnally–Hilgemann Racing | Chevrolet |
| 98 | Jake Garcia | ThorSport Racing | Ford |
| 99 | Ben Rhodes (CC) | ThorSport Racing | Ford |
Official entry list

== Practice ==
The first and only practice session was held on Thursday, September 17, at 3:00 PM EST, and lasted for 50 minutes.

Layne Riggs, driving for Front Row Motorsports, set the fastest time in the session, with a lap of 15.352 seconds, and a speed of 124.987 miles per hour (201.147 km/h).

=== Practice results ===
| Pos. | # | Driver | Team | Make | Time | Speed |
|---|---|---|---|---|---|---|
| 1 | 34 | Layne Riggs (CC) | Front Row Motorsports | Ford | 15.352 | 124.987 |
| 2 | 88 | Ty Majeski (CC) | ThorSport Racing | Ford | 15.414 | 124.484 |
| 3 | 98 | Jake Garcia | ThorSport Racing | Ford | 15.479 | 123.961 |
Full practice results

== Starting lineup ==
Qualifying was held on Thursday, September 17, at 4:05 PM EST, but after 28 trucks took a lap, the rest of the session was cancelled due to lightning in the area. As a result, Layne Riggs, driving for Front Row Motorsports, was awarded the pole position as a result of NASCAR's pandemic formula with a score of 1.000.

Justin Carroll was the only driver who failed to qualify.

=== Starting lineup ===
| Pos. | # | Driver | Team | Make |
|---|---|---|---|---|
| 1 | 34 | Layne Riggs (CC) | Front Row Motorsports | Ford |
| 2 | 38 | Chandler Smith (CC) | Front Row Motorsports | Ford |
| 3 | 11 | Kaden Honeycutt (CC) | Tricon Garage | Toyota |
| 4 | 77 | Tristan McKee (OC) | Spire Motorsports | Chevrolet |
| 5 | 52 | Stewart Friesen | Halmar Friesen Racing | Toyota |
| 6 | 62 | William Sawalich (i) | Halmar Friesen Racing | Toyota |
| 7 | 19 | Daniel Hemric (CC) | McAnally–Hilgemann Racing | Chevrolet |
| 8 | 88 | Ty Majeski (CC) | ThorSport Racing | Ford |
| 9 | 16 | Justin Haley | Kaulig Racing | Ram |
| 10 | 9 | Grant Enfinger (CC) | CR7 Motorsports | Chevrolet |
| 11 | 42 | Parker Eatmon | Niece Motorsports | Chevrolet |
| 12 | 98 | Jake Garcia | ThorSport Racing | Ford |
| 13 | 18 | Tyler Ankrum (CC) | McAnally–Hilgemann Racing | Chevrolet |
| 14 | 99 | Ben Rhodes (CC) | ThorSport Racing | Ford |
| 15 | 10 | Corey LaJoie | Kaulig Racing | Ram |
| 16 | 5 | Bayley Currey | Tricon Garage | Toyota |
| 17 | 12 | Brenden Queen (R) | Kaulig Racing | Ram |
| 18 | 13 | Cole Butcher (R) | ThorSport Racing | Ford |
| 19 | 17 | Gio Ruggiero (CC) | Tricon Garage | Toyota |
| 20 | 15 | Tanner Gray | Tricon Garage | Toyota |
| 21 | 91 | Christian Eckes (CC) | McAnally–Hilgemann Racing | Chevrolet |
| 22 | 7 | Connor Mosack (OC) | Spire Motorsports | Chevrolet |
| 23 | 25 | Regan Smith | Kaulig Racing | Ram |
| 24 | 14 | Mini Tyrrell (R) | Kaulig Racing | Ram |
| 25 | 1 | Nick Leitz (OC) | Tricon Garage | Toyota |
| 26 | 4 | Connor Hall | Niece Motorsports | Chevrolet |
| 27 | 44 | Andrés Pérez de Lara | Niece Motorsports | Chevrolet |
| 28 | 45 | Landen Lewis (OC) | Niece Motorsports | Chevrolet |
| 29 | 26 | Dawson Sutton | Rackley W.A.R. | Chevrolet |
| 30 | 33 | Frankie Muniz | Team Reaume | Ford |
| 31 | 56 | Timmy Hill | Hill Motorsports | Toyota |
Qualified by owner's points
| 32 | 81 | Kris Wright | McAnally–Hilgemann Racing | Chevrolet |
| 33 | 22 | Jackson Macenko | Team Reaume | Ford |
| 34 | 76 | Caden Kvapil | Freedom Racing Enterprises | Chevrolet |
| 35 | 2 | Luke Baldwin | Team Reaume | Ford |
| 36 | 75 | Nick Sanchez | Henderson Motorsports | Chevrolet |
Failed to qualify
| 37 | 90 | Justin Carroll | TC Motorsports | Toyota |
Official starting lineup

== Race ==
=== Race results ===
==== Stage Results ====
Stage One Laps: 65

| Pos. | # | Driver | Team | Make | Pts |
|---|---|---|---|---|---|
| 1 | 34 | Layne Riggs (CC) | Front Row Motorsports | Ford | 10 |
| 2 | 11 | Kaden Honeycutt (CC) | Tricon Garage | Toyota | 9 |
| 3 | 38 | Chandler Smith (CC) | Front Row Motorsports | Ford | 8 |
| 4 | 98 | Jake Garcia | ThorSport Racing | Ford | 7 |
| 5 | 88 | Ty Majeski (CC) | ThorSport Racing | Ford | 6 |
| 6 | 77 | Tristan McKee | Spire Motorsports | Chevrolet | 5 |
| 7 | 19 | Daniel Hemric (CC) | McAnally-Hilgemann Racing | Chevrolet | 4 |
| 8 | 99 | Ben Rhodes (CC) | ThorSport Racing | Ford | 3 |
| 9 | 52 | Stewart Friesen | Halmar Friesen Racing | Toyota | 2 |
| 10 | 16 | Justin Haley | Kaulig Racing | Ram | 1 |

Stage Two Laps: 65

| Pos. | # | Driver | Team | Make | Pts |
|---|---|---|---|---|---|
| 1 | 34 | Layne Riggs (CC) | Front Row Motorsports | Ford | 10 |
| 2 | 11 | Kaden Honeycutt (CC) | Tricon Garage | Toyota | 9 |
| 3 | 38 | Chandler Smith (CC) | Front Row Motorsports | Ford | 8 |
| 4 | 98 | Jake Garcia | ThorSport Racing | Ford | 7 |
| 5 | 88 | Ty Majeski (CC) | ThorSport Racing | Ford | 6 |
| 6 | 52 | Stewart Friesen | Halmar Friesen Racing | Toyota | 5 |
| 7 | 1 | Nick Leitz | Tricon Garage | Toyota | 4 |
| 8 | 15 | Tanner Gray | Tricon Garage | Toyota | 3 |
| 9 | 5 | Bayley Currey | Tricon Garage | Toyota | 2 |
| 10 | 77 | Tristan McKee | Spire Motorsports | Chevrolet | 1 |

=== Final Stage Results ===
Stage Three Laps: 120

| Fin | St | # | Driver | Team | Make | Laps | Led | Status | Pts |
|---|---|---|---|---|---|---|---|---|---|
| 1 | 12 | 98 | Jake Garcia | ThorSport Racing | Ford | 250 | 104 | Running | 69 |
| 2 | 16 | 5 | Bayley Currey | Tricon Garage | Toyota | 250 | 0 | Running | 37 |
| 3 | 5 | 52 | Stewart Friesen | Halmar Friesen Racing | Toyota | 250 | 10 | Running | 41 |
| 4 | 9 | 16 | Justin Haley | Kaulig Racing | Ram | 250 | 0 | Running | 34 |
| 5 | 4 | 77 | Tristan McKee (OC) | Spire Motorsports | Chevrolet | 250 | 0 | Running | 38 |
| 6 | 19 | 17 | Gio Ruggiero (CC) | Tricon Garage | Toyota | 250 | 0 | Running | 31 |
| 7 | 6 | 62 | William Sawalich (i) | Halmar Friesen Racing | Toyota | 250 | 0 | Running | 0 |
| 8 | 3 | 11 | Kaden Honeycutt (CC) | Tricon Garage | Toyota | 250 | 1 | Running | 47 |
| 9 | 8 | 88 | Ty Majeski (CC) | ThorSport Racing | Ford | 250 | 0 | Running | 40 |
| 10 | 10 | 9 | Grant Enfinger (CC) | CR7 Motorsports | Chevrolet | 250 | 0 | Running | 27 |
| 11 | 14 | 99 | Ben Rhodes (CC) | ThorSport Racing | Ford | 250 | 0 | Running | 29 |
| 12 | 7 | 19 | Daniel Hemric (CC) | McAnally–Hilgemann Racing | Chevrolet | 250 | 0 | Running | 29 |
| 13 | 13 | 18 | Tyler Ankrum (CC) | McAnally–Hilgemann Racing | Chevrolet | 250 | 0 | Running | 24 |
| 14 | 28 | 45 | Landen Lewis (OC) | Niece Motorsports | Chevrolet | 250 | 0 | Running | 23 |
| 15 | 29 | 26 | Dawson Sutton | Rackley W.A.R. | Chevrolet | 250 | 0 | Running | 22 |
| 16 | 20 | 15 | Tanner Gray | Tricon Garage | Toyota | 250 | 0 | Running | 24 |
| 17 | 27 | 44 | Andrés Pérez de Lara | Niece Motorsports | Chevrolet | 250 | 0 | Running | 20 |
| 18 | 15 | 10 | Corey LaJoie | Kaulig Racing | Ram | 250 | 0 | Running | 19 |
| 19 | 35 | 2 | Luke Baldwin | Team Reaume | Ford | 250 | 0 | Running | 18 |
| 20 | 36 | 75 | Nick Sanchez | Henderson Motorsports | Chevrolet | 249 | 0 | Running | 17 |
| 21 | 17 | 12 | Brenden Queen (R) | Kaulig Racing | Ram | 249 | 0 | Running | 16 |
| 22 | 31 | 56 | Timmy Hill | Hill Motorsports | Toyota | 249 | 0 | Running | 15 |
| 23 | 23 | 25 | Regan Smith | Kaulig Racing | Ram | 248 | 0 | Running | 14 |
| 24 | 2 | 38 | Chandler Smith (CC) | Front Row Motorsports | Ford | 247 | 0 | Running | 30 |
| 25 | 22 | 7 | Connor Mosack (OC) | Spire Motorsports | Chevrolet | 246 | 0 | Running | 12 |
| 26 | 24 | 14 | Mini Tyrrell (R) | Kaulig Racing | Ram | 245 | 0 | Running | 11 |
| 27 | 32 | 81 | Kris Wright | McAnally–Hilgemann Racing | Chevrolet | 244 | 0 | Running | 10 |
| 28 | 18 | 13 | Cole Butcher (R) | ThorSport Racing | Ford | 244 | 0 | Running | 9 |
| 29 | 26 | 4 | Connor Hall | Niece Motorsports | Chevrolet | 243 | 0 | Running | 8 |
| 30 | 21 | 91 | Christian Eckes (CC) | McAnally–Hilgemann Racing | Chevrolet | 242 | 0 | Running | 7 |
| 31 | 11 | 42 | Parker Eatmon | Niece Motorsports | Chevrolet | 241 | 0 | Running | 6 |
| 32 | 1 | 34 | Layne Riggs (CC) | Front Row Motorsports | Ford | 234 | 135 | Running | 25 |
| 33 | 30 | 33 | Frankie Muniz | Team Reaume | Ford | 231 | 0 | Running | 4 |
| 34 | 25 | 1 | Nick Leitz (OC) | Tricon Garage | Toyota | 224 | 0 | Suspension | 7 |
| 35 | 34 | 76 | Caden Kvapil | Freedom Racing Enterprises | Chevrolet | 166 | 0 | Engine | 2 |
| 36 | 33 | 22 | Jackson Macenko | Team Reaume | Ford | 39 | 0 | Too Slow | 1 |
Official race results

=== Race statistics ===
- Lead changes: 5 among 4 different drivers
- Cautions/Laps: 4 for 38 laps
- Red flags: 1
- Time of race: 1 hour, 33 minutes and 44 seconds
- Average speed: 85.295 miles per hour (137.269 km/h)

== Standings after the race ==
Drivers' Championship standings

| | Pos | Driver | Points |
|---|---|---|---|
| | 1 | Layne Riggs | 2,125 |
| | 2 | Kaden Honeycutt | 2,122 (–3) |
| | 3 | Chandler Smith | 2,095 (–30) |
| 2 | 4 | Ty Majeski | 2,090 (–35) |
| | 5 | Gio Ruggiero | 2,086 (–39) |
| 1 | 6 | Grant Enfinger | 2,072 (–53) |
| 1 | 7 | Daniel Hemric | 2,069 (–56) |
| 4 | 8 | Christian Eckes | 2,067 (–58) |
| | 9 | Ben Rhodes | 2,064 (–61) |
| | 10 | Tyler Ankrum | 2,054 (–71) |
Official driver's standings

Manufacturers' Championship standings

| Pos | Manufacturer | Points |
|---|---|---|
| 1 | Ford | 811 |
| 2 | Toyota | 763 (–48) |
| 3 | Chevrolet | 725 (–86) |
| 4 | Ram | 491 (–320) |

- Note: Only the first 10 positions are included for the driver standings.

| Previous race: 2026 Team EJP 175 | NASCAR Craftsman Truck Series; 2026 season | Next race: 2026 RaceToStopSuicide.com 200 |
