= Thornburg, Virginia =

- Unincorporated community
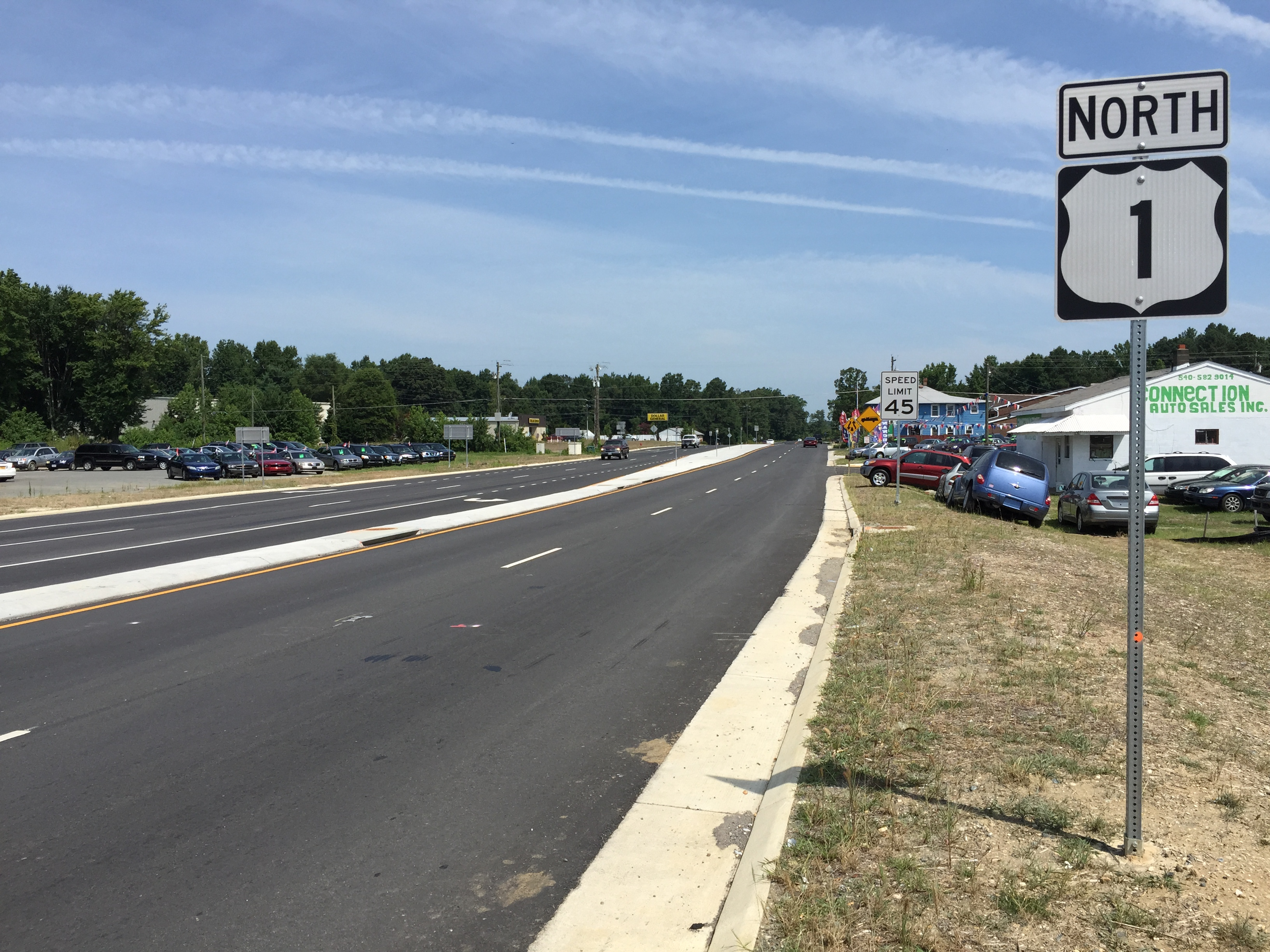
- U.S. Route 1 through Thornburg

- Location within Northern Virginia Location within Virginia Location within the United States
- Coordinates: 38°8′0″N 77°31′18″W
- Country: United States
- State: Virginia
- County: Spotsylvania
- Time zone: UTC−5 (Eastern (EST))
  - Summer (DST): UTC−4 (EDT)
- ZIP code: 22565

Thornburg is an unincorporated community in Spotsylvania County in the U.S. state of Virginia. Thornburg is centered on the intersection of the Jefferson Davis Highway (U.S. 1) with Morris, Mudd Tavern, and South Roxbury Mill Roads. According to the Geographic Names Information System, Thornburg has also been known as Mudd Tavern and Thornsburg throughout its history. The town is located near Interstate 95 exit 118, where several motels and travel-related businesses exist.

Thornburg is the site of the Dominion Raceway, which opened in 2016, and the future site of a Kalahari Resorts location, which is planned to open in 2026.
