= Larry Phillips (racing driver) =

American racing driver (1942–2004)

- Born: July 3, 1942; Springfield, Missouri, U.S.
- Died: September 21, 2004 (aged 62)
- Achievements: 1989, 1991, 1992, 1995, 1996 Winston Racing Series Champion
- Awards: National Dirt Late Model Hall of Fame (2001); Named one of the 25 Greatest Whelen All-American Series Drivers of All-Time (2006); Named one of NASCAR's 75 Greatest Drivers (2023); NASCAR Hall of Fame (2027)

NASCAR Cup Series career
- 1 race run over 1 year
- First race: 1976 Los Angeles Times 500 (Ontario)
Wins	Top tens	Poles
0	0	0

ARCA Menards Series West career
- 1 race run over 1 year
- First race: 1976 Los Angeles Times 500 (Ontario)
Wins	Top tens	Poles
0	0	0
- Statistics up to date as of January 18, 2026.

Larry Phillips (July 3, 1942 – September 21, 2004) was an American racing driver and race car builder with a driving career starting in 1960 and running until 2001. Phillips was the first person to win the NASCAR Weekly Series national championship five times. He won that title in 1989, 1991, 1992, 1995, and 1996. As a driver, he won seven NASCAR Weekly Series regional championships and thirteen track championships.

== Early life ==
Phillips was born in Springfield, Missouri, son of Jim and Margie Phillips. He attended Bois D'Arc grade school in a suburb of Springfield, Missouri and Parkview High School in Springfield, Missouri.

== NASCAR touring series ==
Phillips competed in one NASCAR touring series race in 1976. The race was a combined Winston Cup Series / Winston West Series event at Ontario Motor Speedway. He started 24th and finished 13th overall. Since he was the highest finisher in a Winston West car, he was credited with a win in the class.

== Racing career ==
After years as a star in Midwestern dirt Late Model racing, Phillips switched to asphalt tracks in 1989 when two tracks near him: I-44 Speedway, Lebanon MO and Speedway USA, Bolivar MO were paved. That year, driving an asphalt Late Model that he owned, Phillips won 23 of the 27 NASCAR-sanctioned races that he entered, and won the track championship at Bolivar Speedway in Missouri.

In 1990, Phillips added James Ince (later a winning Winston Cup crew chief) to his team, and won 32 races in 40 starts in 1991 at race tracks in Kansas and Missouri.

The team's success continued in 1992 at the same race tracks, winning 38 times in 40 starts despite a trailer fire en route to the only double-feature event on their schedule. The team had more than 70 wins for the season including some late season dirt races.

In 1995, Phillips once again won 32 out of 40 races, winning the national championship over Greg Biffle by a tiebreaker.

In his final national championship season, 1996, Phillips earned 14 wins in 20 starts.

Phillips was diagnosed with lung cancer in 2000, but continued to race until the first race of the 2001 season. With his energy fading, he retired rather than race without confidence in being ready to win.

== Honors ==
- As part of the 25th anniversary of the NASCAR Weekly Series in 2006, Phillips was named one of the series' All Time Top 25 drivers.
- 2013 NASCAR Hall of Fame Nominee
- 2020 NASCAR Hall of Fame Nominee
- Named to NASCAR's 75 Greatest Drivers
- 2025 NASCAR Hall of Fame Nominee
- 2027 NASCAR Hall of Fame Inductee

== Motorsports career results ==
=== NASCAR ===
(key) (Bold – Pole position awarded by qualifying time. Italics – Pole position earned by points standings or practice time. * – Most laps led.)

==== Winston Cup Series ====
NASCAR Winston Cup Series results
Year	Team	No.	Make	1	2	3	4	5	6	7	8	9	10	11	12	13	14	15	16	17	18	19	20	21	22	23	24	25	26	27	28	29	30	NWCC	Pts	Ref
1976	Jerry Lankford	55	Ford	RSD	DAY	CAR	RCH	BRI	ATL	NWS	DAR	MAR	TAL	NSV	DOV	CLT	RSD	MCH	DAY	NSV	POC	TAL	MCH	BRI	DAR	RCH	DOV	MAR	NWS	CLT	CAR	ATL	ONT; 13	N/A	0	
