= Peyton Sellers =

American racing driver (born 1983)

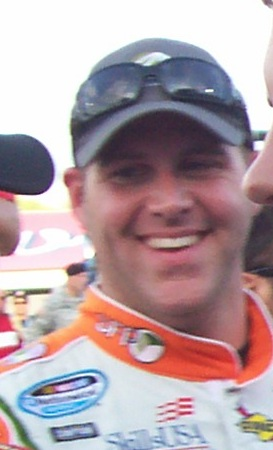
- Sellers in 2009
- Born: October 20, 1983 (age 43); Danville, Virginia, U.S.
- Height: 6 ft 1 in (185 cm)
- Achievements: 2005, 2021 NASCAR Advance Auto Parts Weekly Series National Champion; 2005 NASCAR Dodge Weekly Series Division I Champion; 2013, 2014, 2018, 2022, 2024 Virginia Late Model Triple Crown Series Champion; 2005, 2014, 2017, 2018, 2019, 2021, 2024 South Boston Speedway Track Champion; 2021 Dominion Raceway Champion; 2022 ValleyStar Credit Union 300 Winner; 2018, 2019 Thunder Road 200 Winner; 2013 Hampton Heat 200 Winner

NASCAR O'Reilly Auto Parts Series career
- 28 races run over 4 years
- 2015 position: 27th
- Best finish: 27th (2015)
- First race: 2006 New England 200 (Loudon)
- Last race: 2015 Zippo 200 at The Glen (Watkins Glen)
Wins	Top tens	Poles
0	0	0

NASCAR FedEx Freight Truck Series career
- 8 races run over 6 years
- 2014 position: 67th
- Best finish: 59th (2009)
- First race: 2007 Silverado 350K (Texas)
- Last race: 2014 Kroger 200 (Martinsville)
Wins	Top tens	Poles
0	0	0
- Statistics up to date as of August 8, 2015.

Peyton Sellers (born October 20, 1983) is an American professional stock car racing driver. He won the 2005 and 2021 national championship of NASCAR's Weekly Racing Series. He competed for several seasons in both the NASCAR Xfinity Series and NASCAR Camping World Truck Series.

== Racing career ==
=== Local racing ===
Sellers started his racing career in karting, beginning at the age of seven. By the age of 13, Sellers was driving open wheel sprint cars, collecting 11 feature wins in his first 20 races. After competing for several years in Sprints, Sellers decided to try his hand in stock car racing on asphalt ovals. He ran the 2001 season in the Limited Sportsman division at Orange County Speedway in Rougemont, North Carolina. He competed at South Boston Speedway in Virginia as a rookie in 2002, winning Rookie of the Year honors in the Late Model Stock Car division.

In 2005, Sellers won 14 of his 16 starts at South Boston, winning the Dodge Weekly Series National championship.

=== National NASCAR racing ===
In 2006 Sellers raced in the NASCAR Autozone West Series, where he drove the No. 16 NAPA Auto Parts Chevrolet, his only win coming at Douglas County Speedway on July 1, 2006. He was a member of the Richard Childress Racing driver development program during that season. Sellers also competed in his first NASCAR Busch Series race at New Hampshire International Speedway, driving the No. 31 Chevrolet for Marsh Racing.

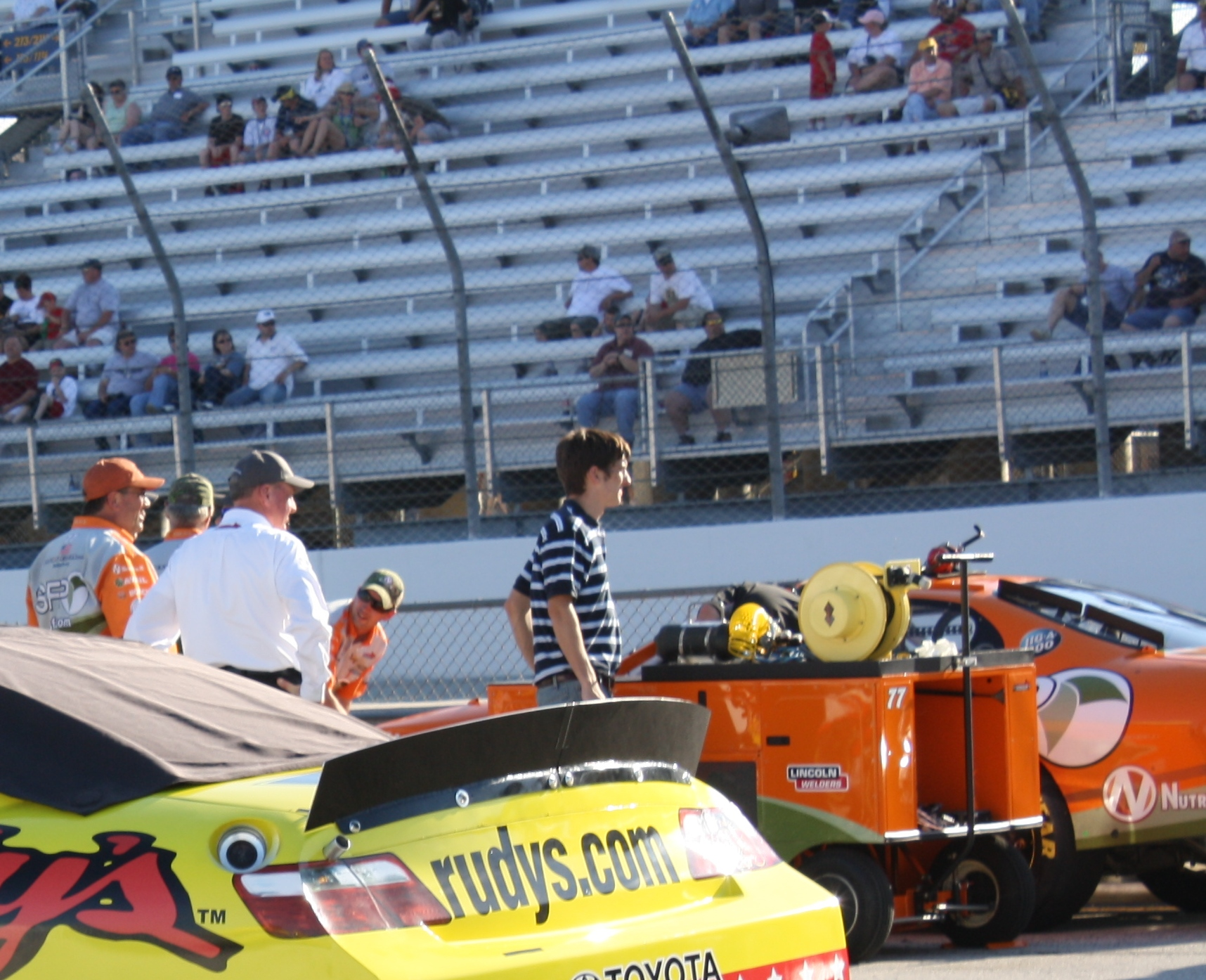
Seller's 2009 No. 77 Nationwide car (orange)

Sellers headed back east for the 2007 season and raced out of his home shop with brother, HC Sellers, as crew chief. Sellers finished third overall in the NASCAR Busch East Series. He would go on to finish second in the Toyota All-Star Showdown.

In 2008, Sellers signed on with Andy Santerre Motorsports in the No. 44 Chevrolet. Sellers took the pole and the win at the season opener at Greenville-Pickens Speedway, in Greenville, SC. The victory was short-lived due to a rules infraction. Sellers was stripped of his win and given a 30th-place finish. At Iowa, in the closing laps, Sellers took second from Austin Dillon before a caution but he was placed back into fourth place on the restart (the position he was in on the restart after the previous yellow) because the NASCAR officials determined that a full lap had not been run since Sellers was in fourth and he never had the chance to challenge Brian Ickler for the lead. In the season finale at Stafford, Sellers finally win his first race. He finished the season eighth overall points standings, with a series high three poles. Peyton again came close to taking the win at the Toyota All-Star Showdown, with Jig-A-Loo as his sponsor, when a last lap spin out, while in the lead, made him finish 14th. The announcement came in December 2008 that Sellers would run a limited Nationwide Series schedule in 2009 with Cardinal Motorsports. Sellers is part owner of Cardinal Motorsports, alongside Will Spencer of JKS Motorsports and Ed Berrier. In January, Cardinal Motorsports announced a ten race NASCAR Nationwide sponsorship with SFP.

Sellers was suspended from NASCAR competition on October 25, 2011, as a result of an altercation following a race at South Boston Speedway until March 1, 2012.

For 2015, Sellers planned to race in the NASCAR Xfinity Series full-time, taking over the No. 97 for Obaika Racing after Josh Reaume was released from the team after three race weekends, but was released from the team after Watkins Glen due to mediocre results.

After leaving NASCAR competition as a driver, Sellers he co-owned NASCAR K&N Pro Series East team Hunt-Sellers Racing with former KNPSE competitor Sam Hunt. However the partnership ended in 2018. Sam Hunt renamed his team to Sam Hunt Racing and moved to Xfinity Series.

=== Regional racing ===
Sellers' team (Sellers Racing Inc.) then fielded cars in the NASCAR Advance Auto Parts Weekly Series. Sellers continued to racing at local tracks. In 2021, Sellers won the track championships at Dominion Speedway and South Boston Speedway to win his second NASCAR Weekly Series championships by 34 points.

On April 2, 2022, the Superstar Racing Experience announced that Sellers would race in the series' June 25 race at South Boston.

== Family life ==
Sellers grew up in Danville, Virginia. His parents are Mary and Burt Sellers. For his 2021 championship, his father was his spotter, his mother records the races, and his brother H.C. was his crew chief/team operator. Sellers' wife Jennie attended his races.

== Motorsports career results ==
=== NASCAR ===
(key) (Bold – Pole position awarded by qualifying time. Italics – Pole position earned by points standings or practice time. * – Most laps led.)

==== Xfinity Series ====
NASCAR Xfinity Series results
Year	Team	No.	Make	1	2	3	4	5	6	7	8	9	10	11	12	13	14	15	16	17	18	19	20	21	22	23	24	25	26	27	28	29	30	31	32	33	34	35	NXSC	Pts	Ref
2006	Marsh Racing	31	Chevy	DAY	CAL	MXC	LVS	ATL	BRI	TEX	NSH	PHO	TAL	RCH	DAR	CLT	DOV	NSH	KEN	MLW	DAY	CHI	NHA; 37	MAR	GTY	IRP	GLN	MCH	BRI	CAL	RCH	DOV	KAN	CLT	MEM; 33	TEX	PHO	HOM	109th	116	
2009	Cardinal Motorsports	77	Chevy	DAY	CAL	LVS	BRI	TEX; 26	NSH	PHO	TAL	RCH; 19	DAR	CLT; 31	DOV; 31	NSH	KEN	MLW; 15	NHA	DAY	CHI	GTY	IRP; 26	IOW; DNQ	GLN; DNQ	MCH	BRI; 31	CGV	ATL; 28	RCH	DOV	KAN; 33	CAL	CLT; DNQ	MEM	TEX	PHO	HOM	58th	747	
2010	Sellers Racing Inc.	25	Chevy	DAY	CAL	LVS	BRI	NSH	PHO	TEX	TAL	RCH	DAR	DOV	CLT; Wth	NSH	KEN	ROA	NHA; DNQ	DAY	CHI	GTY	IRP	IOW	GLN	MCH	BRI	CGV	ATL	RCH	DOV	KAN	CAL	CLT					147th	3	
2010	R3 Motorsports	23	Chevy																																GTY; 20	TEX	PHO	HOM	147th	3	
2015	Obaika Racing	97	Chevy	DAY	ATL	LVS	PHO; 36	CAL; 29	TEX; 30	BRI; 32	RCH; 32	TAL; 18	IOW; 28	CLT; 28	DOV; 25	MCH; 24	CHI; 27	DAY; 16	KEN; 31	NHA; 26	IND; 35	IOW	GLN; 34	MOH	BRI	ROA	DAR	RCH	CHI	KEN	DOV	CLT	KAN	TEX	PHO	HOM			27th	238	

==== Camping World Truck Series ====
NASCAR Camping World Truck Series results
Year	Team	No.	Make	1	2	3	4	5	6	7	8	9	10	11	12	13	14	15	16	17	18	19	20	21	22	23	24	25	NCWTC	Pts	Ref
2007	Jeff Milburn Racing	76	Chevy	DAY	CAL	ATL	MAR	KAN	CLT	MFD	DOV	TEX	MCH	MLW	MEM	KEN	IRP	NSH	BRI	GTW	NHA	LVS	TAL	MAR	ATL	TEX; 31	PHO	HOM	100th	70	
2009	DGM Racing	72	Chevy	DAY	CAL	ATL	MAR	KAN	CLT	DOV	TEX	MCH	MLW; 32	MEM	KEN	IRP	NSH	BRI	CHI	IOW	GTW	NHA	LVS						76th	137	
2009	Premier Racing	17	Toyota																					MAR; 31	TAL	TEX	PHO	HOM	76th	137	
2010	Turn One Racing	64	Chevy	DAY	ATL	MAR	NSH	KAN	DOV	CLT	TEX	MCH	IOW	GTY	IRP	POC	NSH	DAR	BRI	CHI	KEN	NHA; 21	LVS	MAR	TAL	TEX	PHO	HOM	98th	100	
2011	Turn One Racing	66	Chevy	DAY	PHO	DAR	MAR	NSH	DOV	CLT	KAN	TEX	KEN	IOW	NSH	IRP	POC; 25	MCH; 28	BRI	ATL	CHI	NHA	KEN	LVS	TAL	MAR	TEX	HOM	59th	35	
2012	Turn One Racing	60	Chevy	DAY	MAR	CAR	KAN	CLT	DOV	TEX	KEN	IOW	CHI	POC	MCH	BRI	ATL	IOW	KEN	LVS	TAL	MAR; 20	TEX	PHO	HOM				65th	26	
2014	Win-Tron Racing	35	Toyota	DAY	MAR	KAN	CLT	DOV	TEX	GTW	KEN	IOW	ELD	POC	MCH	BRI	MSP	CHI	NHA	LVS	TAL	MAR; 17	TEX	PHO	HOM				67th	27	

==== K&N Pro Series East ====
NASCAR K&N Pro Series East results
Year	Team	No.	Make	1	2	3	4	5	6	7	8	9	10	11	12	13	14	NKNPSEC	Pts	Ref
2006	Marsh Racing	31	Chevy	GRE; 12	STA	HOL	TMP	ERI	NHA; 33	ADI	WFD	NHA; 7	DOV; DNQ	LRP				34th	358	
2007	Sellers Racing Inc.	83	Chevy	GRE; 4	ELK; 5	IOW; 21	**SBO**; 2*	STA; 14	NHA; 9	TMP; 12	NSH; 16	ADI; 4		MFD; 7	NHA; 4	DOV; 9		3rd	1862	
2007	Sellers Racing Inc.	83	Ford										LRP; 8					3rd	1862	
2008	Andy Santerre Motorsports	44	Chevy	**GRE**; 30	IOW; 11	SBO; 3	GLN; 18	NHA; 29	TMP; 18	**NSH**; 2*	ADI; 9*	LRP; 3	MFD; 3	**NHA**; 20	DOV; 18	STA; 1		8th	1732	
2013	Hattori Racing Enterprises	01	Toyota	BRI	GRE	FIF	RCH	BGS	IOW	LGY	COL	IOW	VIR; 7	GRE	NHA	DOV	RAL	53rd	37	
2015	DRIVE Technology	18	Toyota	NSM	GRE; 10	BRI	IOW	BGS	LGY	COL	NHA	IOW	GLN	MOT	VIR	RCH	DOV; 18	38th	60	
2017	Hunt-Sellers Racing	18	Toyota	NSM	GRE	BRI	SBO; 9	SBO; 8	MEM	BLN	TMP	NHA	IOW	GLN	LGY	NJM	DOV	27th	71	

==== Autozone West Series ====
NASCAR Autozone West Series results
Year	Team	No.	Make	1	2	3	4	5	6	7	8	9	10	11	12	NAWC	Pts	Ref
2006	Bill McAnally Racing	16	Chevy	PHO; 5	PHO; 2	S99; 15	IRW; 23	SON; 3	**DCS**; 1*	**IRW**; 16	EVG; 5	S99; 3	CAL; 21	CTS; 16	AMP; 20	5th	1675	

==== Goody's Dash Series ====
NASCAR Goody's Dash Series results
Year	Team	No.	Make	1	2	3	4	5	6	7	8	9	10	11	12	13	14	NGDS	Pts	Ref
2002	N/A	26	Pontiac	DAY	HAR	ROU	LON	CLT	KEN	MEM	GRE	SNM	SBO; 9	MYB	BRI	MOT	ATL	61st	138	

^{*} Season still in progress
^{1} Ineligible for series points

=== ARCA Re/Max Series ===
(key) (Bold – Pole position awarded by qualifying time. Italics – Pole position earned by points standings or practice time. * – Most laps led.)

ARCA Re/Max Series results
Year	Team	No.	Make	1	2	3	4	5	6	7	8	9	10	11	12	13	14	15	16	17	18	19	20	21	22	ARSC	Pts	Ref
2004	Sellers Racing Inc.	04	Pontiac	DAY	NSH	SLM	KEN	TOL	CLT	KAN	POC	MCH	SBO; 25	BLN	KEN	GTW	POC	LER	NSH	ISF	TOL	DSF	CHI	SLM	TAL	155th	105	
2009	Sellers Racing Inc.	47	Chevy	DAY; 36	SLM	CAR	TAL	KEN	TOL	POC	MCH	MFD	IOW	KEN	BLN	POC	ISF	CHI	TOL	DSF	NJE	SLM	KAN; 13	CAR		102nd	215	

=== Rolex Sports Car Series ===
(key) Bold – Pole Position. (Overall Finish/Class Finish).

Grand-Am Rolex Sports Car Series DP results
Year	Team	No.	Chassis	1	2	3	4	5	6	7	8	9	10	11	12	13	14	Pos	Pts	Ref
2005	Synergy Racing	86	BMW-Picchio	DAY (60/29)	HOM	FON	LS	CMT	WGL	DAY	ALA	WGL	MOH	PHO	WGL	VIR	MXC	147th	2	

==== 24 Hours of Daytona ====
(key)

24 Hours of Daytona results
Year	Class	No	Team	Car	Co-drivers	Laps	Position	Class Pos.
2005	DP	86	(United States) Synergy Racing	BMW-Picchio	(United States) Steve Marshall (United States) Jason Workman (United States) Archie Urciuoli	134	60 ^{DNF}	29 ^{DNF}

=== Superstar Racing Experience ===
(key) * – Most laps led. ^{1} – Heat 1 winner. ^{2} – Heat 2 winner.

Superstar Racing Experience results
Year	No.	1	2	3	4	5	6	SRXC	Pts
2022	26	FIF	SBO; 10	STA	NSV	I55	SHA	20th	10

=== CARS Late Model Stock Car Tour ===
(key) (Bold – Pole position awarded by qualifying time. Italics – Pole position earned by points standings or practice time. * – Most laps led. ** – All laps led.)

CARS Late Model Stock Car Tour results
Year	Team	No.	Make	1	2	3	4	5	6	7	8	9	10	11	12	13	14	15	16	17	CLMSCTC	Pts	Ref
2020	Sellers Racing Inc.	26	Toyota	SNM	ACE	HCY	HCY	DOM	FCS	LGY	CCS	FLO	GRE; 24								54th	10	
2022	Sellers Racing Inc.	26	Toyota	CRW; 11	HCY	GRE	AAS	FCS	LGY	DOM	HCY	ACE	MMS	NWS	TCM	ACE	SBO	CRW			50th	22	
2024	Sellers Racing Inc.	26	Toyota	SNM	HCY	AAS	OCS	ACE	TCM	LGY	DOM; 24	CRW	HCY	NWS	ACE	WCS	FLC	SBO; 8	TCM	NWS; 22	N/A	0	
2026	Sellers Racing Inc.	26	Toyota	SNM	WCS	NSV	CRW	ACE	LGY	DOM	NWS	HCY	AND	FLC	TCM	NPS	SBO; 13				62nd	29	
