= NASCAR Local Racing Series =

American auto racing series

- Category: Stock car racing
- Country: United States; Canada
- Inaugural season: 1982
- Drivers' champion: Jacob Goede
- Makes' champion: Ford
- Official website: Local Racing Series

The NASCAR Local Racing Series Powered by O'Reilly Auto Parts (formerly the Advance Auto Parts Weekly Series, Whelen All-American Series, Winston Racing Series and the Dodge Weekly Series) is a points championship for NASCAR-sanctioned local short-track motor racing in the United States and Canada.

NASCAR has organized its in several ways over the decades—initially by geographical proximity to develop regional champions, then randomly among four divisions, and currently by states that have tracks participating.

== History ==
The series logo from June 2020 to February 2026

The series began as the NASCAR Winston Racing Series in 1982 as weekly, local track racing sanctioned by NASCAR. Due to restrictions imposed by the Tobacco Master Settlement Agreement, Winston's sponsorship was replaced by Dodge in 2001 (coinciding with their re-entry to the Cup Series that year), lasting until 2006. Whelen Engineering picked up the sponsorship in 2007, renaming it the NASCAR Whelen All-American Series. For the 2010 season, NASCAR lowered the age minimum for its weekly racing series from 16 to 14.

In 2005 the Weekly Series became the first NASCAR-sanctioned series to have a permanent presence outside of the United States, as tracks in Saint-Eustache, Quebec; Delaware, Ontario; and Wetaskiwin, Alberta, elected to be represented in the series.

Advance Auto Parts assumed naming rights for the series on June 10, 2020.

On February 12, 2026, NASCAR announced that O'Reilly Auto Parts, which had just become the title sponsorship of its #2 series (previously the NASCAR Xfinity Series), would also become the title sponsorship of its local racing series, which would now be known as the NASCAR Local Racing Series Powered by O'Reilly Auto Parts.

== Competition ==
=== Rules and points system ===
Under the original regional format (1982–2004), a competition performance index (CPI) was used to determine the regional and national championships. The complicated CPI used four factors — winning percentage (feature wins / feature starts), top fives (top five finishes / feature starts available at tracks), car counts (track's average car count / highest average car count of track in a region) and starts (features driver started / feature starts available at the track). With the change to the divisional format in 2005 along came a more simplified point system. The system awarded two points per position in the feature event, with a maximum of 25 cars starting and 50 points going to the winner. If more than 25 cars started, two points were awarded from 26th place on back. Bonus points were also awarded to each driver starting a feature — 20 points for at least 21 cars starting, 10 points for 15 to 20 cars starting, and none for less than 15 cars starting. The same system was used when the change to the state format took place in 2007, but the bonus points were reduced to just five points for the feature winner. In 2010 the maximum was dropped to 20 cars starting and 40 points going to the winner. For the 2014 season the maximum cars starting was dropped to 18 resulting in 36 points for the winner. Bonus points for the feature winner was also changed to three points if the winner started in a single-digit position (i.e., fifth) or five points if the winner had a double-digit starting position (i.e., 12th).

=== Divisions ===
What cars are used to score points in the weekly series is up to the discretion of the individual participating tracks, within Weekly Series guidelines. As of 2005, sportsman, two classes of pavement Late Model chassis (Super Late Models, which have offset chassis, and Late Models, which have perimeter chassis), pavement Modifieds (both the "Tour Type" and the SK formula), dirt Modifieds and Late Models, and street stocks, super stocks are considered eligible categories. Participating tracks are all short tracks, ranging from 1/4 mile to 5/8 mile; most are paved, but a significant number of dirt tracks also participate.

== National champions ==
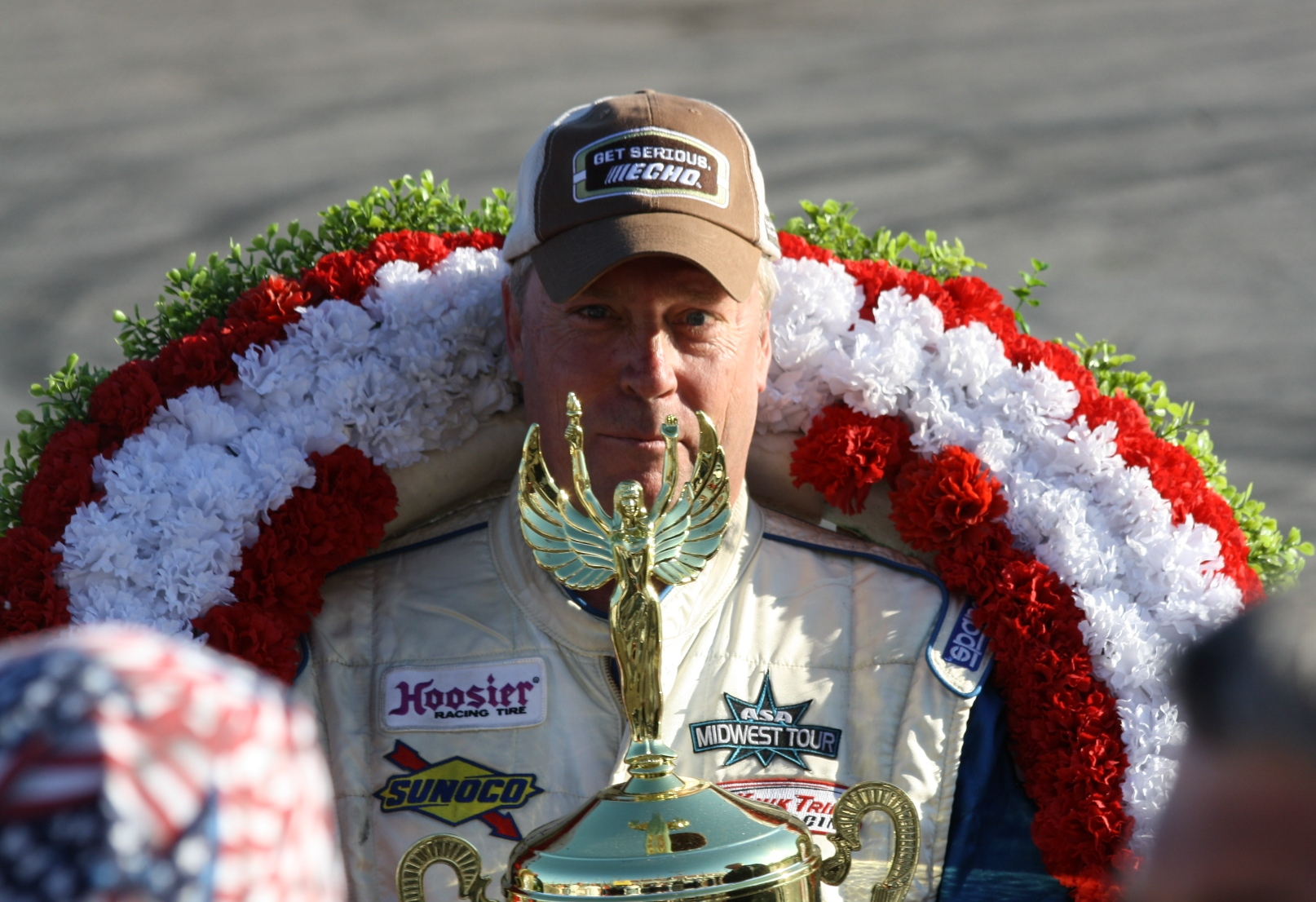
2007 champion Steve Carlson

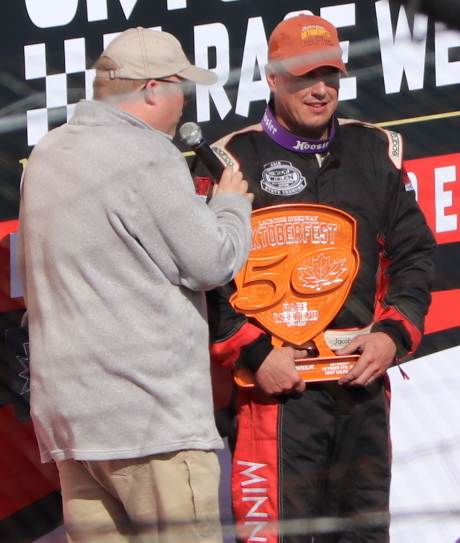
2019 and 2025 champion Jacob Goede (right)

- 1982 – Tom Hearst – Muscatine, IA
- 1983 – Mike Alexander – Franklin, TN
- 1984 – David Into – Hardeeville, SC
- 1985 – Doug McCoun – Prunedale, CA
- 1986 – Joe Kosiski – Omaha, NE
- 1987 – Roger Dolan – Lisbon, IA
- 1988 – Robert Powell – Moncks Corner, SC
- 1989 – Larry Phillips – Springfield, MO
- 1990 – Max Prestwood – Lenoir, NC
- 1991 – Larry Phillips – Springfield, MO
- 1992 – Larry Phillips – Springfield, MO
- 1993 – Barry Beggarly – Pelham, NC
- 1994 – David Rogers – Orlando, FL
- 1995 – Larry Phillips – Springfield, MO
- 1996 – Larry Phillips – Springfield, MO
- 1997 – Dexter Canipe – Claremont, NC
- 1998 – Ed Kosiski – Omaha, NE
- 1999 – Jeff Leka – Buffalo, IL
- 2000 – Gary Webb – Bluegrass, IA
- 2001 – Ted Christopher – Plainville, CT
- 2002 – Peter Daniels – Lebanon, NH
- 2003 – Mark McFarland – Winchester, VA
- 2004 – Greg Pursley – Santa Clarita, CA
- 2005 – Peyton Sellers – Danville, VA
- 2006 – Philip Morris – Ruckersville, VA
- 2007 – Steve Carlson – West Salem, WI
- 2008 – Philip Morris – Ruckersville, VA
- 2009 – Philip Morris – Ruckersville, VA
- 2010 – Keith Rocco – Wallingford, CT
- 2011 – Philip Morris – Ruckersville, VA
- 2012 – Lee Pulliam – Semora, NC
- 2013 – Lee Pulliam – Semora, NC
- 2014 – Anthony Anders – Easley, SC
- 2015 – Lee Pulliam – Semora, NC
- 2016 – Matt Bowling – Ridgeway, VA
- 2017 – Lee Pulliam – Alton, VA
- 2018 – Philip Morris – Ruckersville, VA
- 2019 – Jacob Goede – Carver, MN
- 2020 – Josh Berry – Charlotte, NC
- 2021 – Peyton Sellers – Danville, VA
- 2022 – Layne Riggs – Bahama, NC
- 2023 – Connor Hall – Hampton, VA
- 2024 – Connor Hall – Hampton, VA
- 2025 – Jacob Goede – Carver, MN
- 2026 - Joey Tanner - Portland, OR

== 2026 tracks ==
- Ace Speedway – Altamahaw, North Carolina (0.400 mile asphalt)
- Adams County Speedway – Corning, Iowa (1/2 mile dirt)
- Alaska Raceway Park – Butte, Alaska (1/3 mile asphalt)
- All-American Speedway – Roseville, California (1/3 mile asphalt)
- Arrowhead Speedway - Colcord, Oklahoma (1/3 mile clay)
- Autodrome Chaudière – Vallée-Jonction, Quebec, Canada (1/4 mile asphalt)
- Autodrome Granby – Granby, Quebec, Canada (1/2 mile dirt)
- Berlin Raceway – Marne, Michigan (7/16 mile asphalt)
- Birch Run Speedway and event center – Birch Run, Michigan (0.4 mile asphalt)
- Bowman Gray Stadium – Winston-Salem, North Carolina (1/4 mile asphalt)
- The Bullring at Las Vegas Motor Speedway – North Las Vegas, Nevada (3/8 mile asphalt)
- Caraway Speedway – Asheboro, North Carolina (0.4 mile asphalt)
- Claremont Motorsports Park – Claremont, New Hampshire (1/3 mile asphalt)
- Colorado National Speedway – Erie, Colorado (3/8 mile asphalt)
- Coos Bay Speedway – Coos Bay, Oregon (.387 mile dirt)
- Dells Raceway Park – Wisconsin Dells, Wisconsin (1/3 mile asphalt)
- Dominion Raceway – Thornburg, Virginia (4/10 mile asphalt)
- Eastbound International Speedway – Avondale, Newfoundland, Canada (1/3 mile asphalt)
- Edmonton International Raceway – Wetaskiwin, Alberta, Canada (1/4 mile asphalt)
- Elko Speedway – Elko, Minnesota (3/8 mile asphalt)
- Evergreen Speedway – Monroe, Washington (.646 and 3/8 mile asphalt)
- Grandview Speedway – Bechtelsville, Pennsylvania (1/3 mile dirt)
- Grundy County Speedway – Morris, Illinois (1/3 mile asphalt)
- Hawkeye Downs Speedway – Cedar Rapids, Iowa (1/2 mile and 1/4 mile asphalt)
- Hickory Motor Speedway – Hickory, North Carolina (.363 mile asphalt)
- Jennerstown Speedway Complex – Jennerstown, Pennsylvania (.522 mile asphalt)
- Kevin Harvick's Kern Raceway – Bakersfield, California (1/2 mile asphalt)
- Kingsport Speedway – Kingsport, Tennessee (3/8 mile concrete)
- La Crosse Fairgrounds Speedway – West Salem, Wisconsin (5/8 mile and 1/4 mile asphalt)
- Langley Speedway – Hampton, Virginia (.395 mile asphalt)
- Le RPM Speedway – Saint-Marcel-de-Richelieu, Quebec, Canada (1/4 mile dirt)
- Lonesome Pine Motorsports Park – Coeburn, Virginia (3/8 mile asphalt)
- Magic Valley Speedway – Twin Falls, Idaho (1/3 mile asphalt)
- Meridian Speedway – Meridian, Idaho (1/4 mile asphalt)
- Merritt Speedway – Lake City, Michigan (3/8 mile dirt)
- Monadnock Speedway – Winchester, New Hampshire (1/4 mile asphalt)
- Motorplex at the Mill – Emmitt, Idaho (1/3 mile asphalt)
- New Smyrna Speedway – New Smyrna Beach, Florida (1/2 mile asphalt)
- Riverhead Raceway – Riverhead, New York (1/4 mile asphalt)
- Salina Highbanks Speedway – Pryor, Oklahoma (3/8 mile clay)
- Seekonk Speedway – Seekonk, Massachusetts (1/3 mile asphalt)
- South Boston Speedway – South Boston, Virginia (4/10 mile asphalt)
- Tucson Speedway – Tucson, Arizona (3/8 mile asphalt)
- Wake County Speedway – Raleigh, North Carolina (1/4 mile asphalt)
- Wall Stadium - Wall Township, New Jersey (1/3 mile asphalt)
- Willamette Speedway - Lebanon, Oregon (1/3 mile dirt)
