= Dominion Raceway =

Motorsport venue in the United States

- Location: Thornburg, Virginia
- Coordinates: 38°8′19.73″N 77°30′16.66″W
- Broke ground: 2013 (as new circuit)
- Opened: 1952; Re-opened: 2016 (as new circuit)
- Closed: 2012
- Architect: Dunning Group Architects
- Major events: Current: SMART Modified Tour (2021–2022, 2024–present); CARS Tour (2017, 2019–2026); Former: Legends Road Course World Finals (2016, 2025); ASA STARS National Tour (2025); ASA/CRA Super Series (2025); NASCAR K&N Pro Series East; ComServe Wireless 150 (2016); NASCAR Grand National Series (1958, 1963–1966); NASCAR Convertible Series (1957)
- Website: http://www.dominionraceway.com/

Oval (2016–present)
- Surface: Asphalt
- Length: 0.400 mi (0.644 km)
- Turns: 4
- Banking: Turns: 14° Straights: 9°

Road Course (2016–present)
- Surface: Asphalt
- Length: 2.000 mi (3.219 km)
- Turns: 12

Drag Strip (2016–present)
- Surface: Concrete
- Length: 0.125 mi (0.201 km)

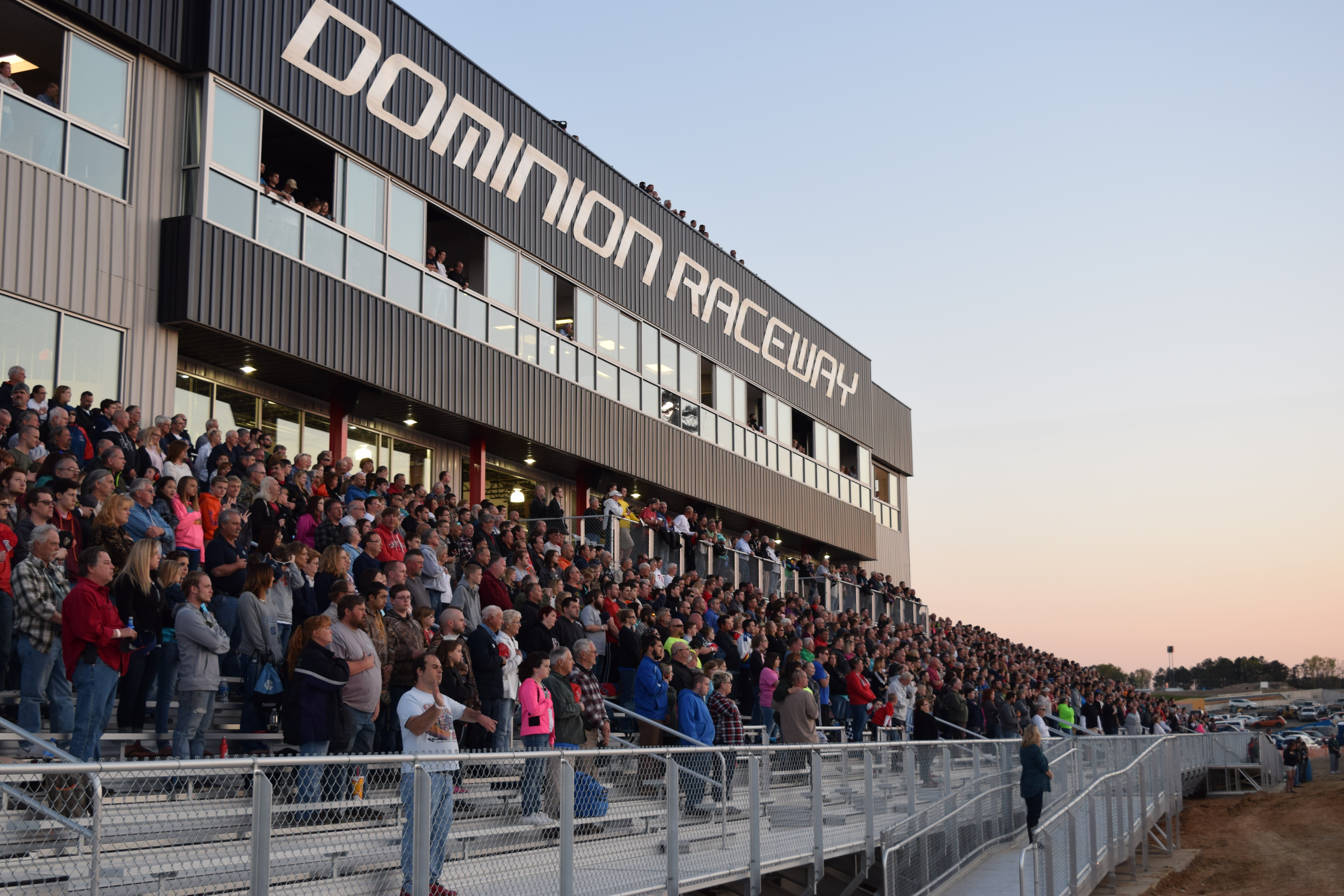
Opening Day 2016

Dominion Raceway is a motorsport complex currently operating in Thornburg, Virginia. The facility includes 0.400 mi (0.644 km) oval track, a 2.000 mi (3.219 km) road course, and a 0.125 mi (0.201 km) drag strip. The track hosts NASCAR, SCCA, and Superkart events along with amateur road course and street racing events.

== New location ==
The motorsport complex at the new location broke ground in 2013 and opened in 2016 at 6501 Dominion Raceway Ave. in Thornburg, Virginia.

== Inaugural winners ==
=== Inaugural race winners ===
Dominion Raceway's First Winners
| Division | Driver | Car No. | Date |
|---|---|---|---|
| K&N Pro Series East | Spencer Davis | 41 | May 30, 2016 |
| Late Model Stock Car | Tyler Hughes | 8 | April 16, 2016 |
| Modified | Chris Humblet | 20 | April 16, 2016 |
| Dominion Stock | Landon Abbott | 70 | May 7, 2016 |
| UCAR | Ryan Pritt | 22 | April 16, 2016 |
| Legends | Mason Diaz | 24 | April 16, 2016 |
| Mini Mods | Bobby Able | 58 | May 14, 2016 |
| Bandolero | Mason Magee | 9 | April 30, 2016 |
| Mini Cup | Kevin Berkstresser | 9 | May 7, 2016 |
| Honda Challenge 2 | Jonathan Baker | 32 | July 23, 2016 |

== Late Model Track Champions ==
- 2016: Nick Smith
- 2017: Doug Barnes Jr.
- 2018: Jeff Oakley
- 2019: Doug Barnes Jr.
- 2020: Peyton Sellers
- 2021: Peyton Sellers
- 2022: Peyton Sellers
- 2023: Peyton Sellers
- 2024: Landon Pembelton
- 2025: Chase Johnson

== Old Dominion Speedway ==
Old Dominion Speedway (ODS) was a motorsport complex located in Prince William County, just south of Manassas, Virginia. The complex closed in 2012.

The dragstrip hosted Friday night drag races and Wednesday evening Test and Tunes. Weekly divisions included: Super Pro, Foot Brake, Motorcycle, Quick 16, and Top Street 5.8. The drag strip, when first used in 1953, was originally a 1/8th-mile dirt track, and the first officially sanctioned drag strip on the East Coast. The 3/8-mile track hosted Late Models, INEX Legends, Mini Modifieds, UCARSet Stocks, Bandoleros, and UCARS. The track was built as a dirt track in 1952 and was paved in 1953.

Old Dominion was also the birthplace of the Late Model Stock Car, "The Late Model Sportsman and Limited Sportsman divisions, along with some support classes ran until 1979, when track promoter Dick Gore came up with an idea for a class that would become one of the fastest growing divisions in NASCAR. 'They said it would never work', says Gore, referring to the Late Model Stock Car division. But work it did as it became one of the most popular divisions, spreading throughout the country." and later became the NASCAR Xfinity Series.

=== Old Dominion Late Model Track Champions ===
- 1979: Billy Earl
- 1980–1982: Not held
- 1983: Charlie Ford
- 1984: Curtis Markham
- 1985: Curtis Markham
- 1986: Danny Fair
- 1987: Eddie Johnson
- 1988: Charlie Ford
- 1989: Charlie Ford
- 1990: Danny Fair
- 1991: Eddie Johnson
- 1992: Danny Fair
- 1993: Brandon Butler
- 1994: Danny Fair
- 1995: Charlie Ford
- 1996: Wes Troup
- 1997: Wes Troup
- 1998: Dale Delozier
- 1999: Dale Delozier
- 2000: Mark McFarland
- 2001: Dustin Storm
- 2002: Mike Darne
- 2003: Mark McFarland
- 2004: Brandon Butler
- 2005: Franklin Butler III
- 2006: Frank Deiny Jr.
- 2007: Michael Hardin
- 2008: Willard Lawrence
- 2009: Willard Lawrence
- 2010: Adam Brenner
- 2011: David Polenz
- 2012: Doug Liberman

=== Old Dominion Kart Series ===
The speedway also hosted a karting series. Divisions include Jr. Sportsman, Kid Kart, Bandelero, Senior Champ, Cadet, Stock Lite, Jr. Stock, and Jr. Champ. Ran by DJ Powell, Ryan, Joshua, and Jonathan Pritt and many more.

=== Special events ===
The track hosted monster trucks, a U.S. Drift sanctioned drifting event, and car shows. The Speedway also hosted six Virginia Sprint races and five Shenandoah Mini Cup Races. They also hosted a Rolling Thunder Modified Race. The premier event at Old Dominion was "The Big One" held at the end of the season. It sees the highest car counts, biggest purse, and more spectators than most events. It was a non-points race for the Late Models, allowing the drivers to go all out to win.

In 2010, the "Big One" was the final race of the season at ODS. It was also the final race in the battle for the Virginia State Championship. C. E. Falk entered the race, needing to win the race to win the Virginia Championship. Despite leading early, he was not able to secure the victory paving the road for Justin Johnson to win the Championship. Adam Brenner won the track championship with a solid finish and the race win went to Mike Darne.

In 2011, Dustin Storm led the most laps. He had to charge through the field after changing a tire before he crossed the line. After the fans filed out and the majority of the media left, Storm was disqualified and Doug Liberman was awarded the win.

In 2012, Michael Hardin won the race before a packed house in what would end up being the final race ever held at the Old Dominion Speedway oval.

"ODS The Big One" winners

- 2006: Dustin Storm
- 2007: Dustin Storm
- 2008: Not held
- 2009: David Polenz
- 2010: Mike Darne
- 2011: Doug Liberman
- 2012: Michael Hardin

Joe Gibbs Youth for Tomorrow 150 winners

- 2010: Mike Darne
- 2011: Mike Darne
- 2012: Dustin Storm

=== NASCAR history ===
The track was called Longview Speedway before the Gore family purchased it. The track hosted Grand National Series races in 1958 and from 1963 to 1966. Former racing greats such as Lee Petty, Richard Petty, Ralph Earnhardt, Ned Jarrett, Bobby Allison, Darrell Waltrip, and Lennie Pond, have raced at ODS. In recent years, Mark McFarland won several track championships and Denny Hamlin raced there. The current driver for the No. 88 Champion Spark Plugs Chevrolet Monte Carlo in the USAR Hooters Pro Cup Series, Richard Boswell also made his start at this track. Many other USAR Hooters Pro Cup Series drivers, such as Jack Bailey, Trevor Bayne, and Charlie Ford have also raced at ODS. In 2006, Albert Anderson became the first African-American to win a race at Old Dominion Speedway.

Winners

- 1958: Frankie Schneider
- 1963: Richard Petty
- 1964: Ned Jarrett
- 1964: Ned Jarrett
- 1965: Junior Johnson
- 1965: Richard Petty
- 1966: Elmo Langley
