= Langley Speedway (Virginia) =

Sports venue in Virginia, United States

Larry King Law's Langley Speedway
- Location: Hampton, Virginia
- Coordinates: 37°5′11″N 76°23′12″W
- Capacity: 9,000 est.
- Owner: Bill Mullis
- Operator: Bill Mullis
- Opened: 1950
- Former names: Langley Speedway (1950–2016)
- Major events: Current: CARS Tour (1998, 2009–2011, 2019–present); Hampton Heat 200 (2008-present); Former: NASCAR K&N Pro Series East; Visit Hampton VA 150 (2011–2015, 2017–2018); NASCAR Whelen Modified Tour (2017–2018, 2022–2023); NASCAR Whelen Southern Modified Tour (1989, 2001–2002, 2010–2015); ASA National Tour (1998–1999); NASCAR Southeast Series (1995); NASCAR Busch Series (1982–1988); NASCAR Grand National Series (1964–1970)

Oval (1950–present)
- Surface: Asphalt
- Length: 0.396 mi (0.637 km)
- Banking: Turns: 6° Straightaways: 4°

Langley Speedway (known as Larry King Law's Langley Speedway for commercial reasons) is a race track located in Hampton, Virginia, United States. Langley Speedway is a paved short track measuring 0.400 mi (0.644 km) in length. It is one of the flattest tracks in the region with only six degrees of banking in the corners and two degrees of banking on the straights. In November 1970, it became the site of the last NASCAR Grand National Series race before the series was renamed the Winston Cup. The track is located in front of NASA's Langley Research Center on Commander Shepard Boulevard.

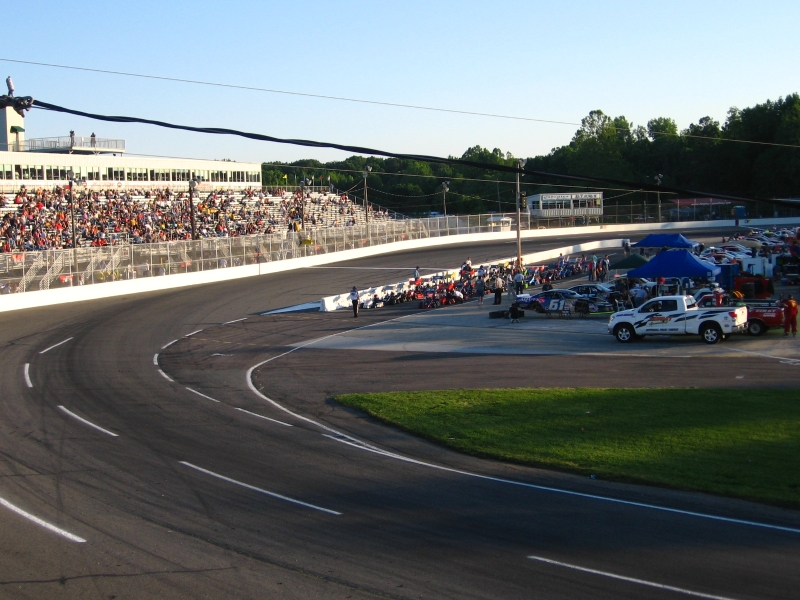
Start of a race in Langley Speedway in 2008

The track is NASCAR sanctioned and participates in the NASCAR Advance Auto Parts Weekly Series, which determines a national champion for the NASCAR sanctioned local tracks. The track hosts 12 divisions that alternate running during their Saturday night program: Late models, Limited Late Models, Modifieds, legends cars, Super Streets, Enduros, Grand Stocks, Super Trucks, UCARS, Pro Six (a Nissan VG30E engine-based class, the engine was used in some Ford products in the 1990s and 2000s), and HRKC Pro Winged Champ Karts. Naming rights sponsorship belongs to an attorney in the region.

Pre race ceremonies for the regular Saturday night events begin at approximately 7:00 PM with the first race of the night beginning about 15 minutes later.

Langley also hosts Hampton Roads Kart Club races on most Sundays and some Fridays during the season, Wacky Wednesday which allows anyone with a helmet and a street legal car to participate in the time attack, burnout competition, and one on one drag races on most Wednesday nights during the season, the Langley Drift Club which helped bring drifting to the Hampton Roads' area, and starting in 2023 Old-Dominion Region-SCCA Autocross events.

== Hampton Heat 200 ==
Overview: The Hampton Heat 200 is a 200-lap race for the Crossroads Fuel Late Model Stock Car Division with a large purse provided by the City of Hampton, Virginia and is the second race in the Virginia Triple Crown. The race was run according to the NASCAR Late Model Stock Car Rule Book and high ranking NASCAR Whelen All American Series officials were brought in to ensure all cars strictly fit the technical regulations. The race was separated into two halves; the first 100 laps are divided from the second 100 laps by a 10-minute break which allowed teams to put more fuel in the car, make setup changes, and rotate the tires. However, they are not allowed to change tires during the break. Contrary to typical late model races at Langley, they do count caution laps during this race.

2008: Run on July 12, 2008, the inaugural running of the race featured a field of 25 cars with drivers from Virginia and North Carolina. Danny Edwards Jr. won the pole for the event during the Friday qualifying session with a 16.049-second lap. C.E. Falk III and Edwards Jr. raced for the lead in the early stages of the race, but Edwards took control of the race and led to the halfway mark. There were a number of early incidents that led to a few drivers dropping out before the halfway point, but the second half ran green most of the way. Midway through the second half Nick Smith started to show his speed and passed Edwards Jr. for the lead; he extended that to a dominating lead in the late stages of the race. Driving James Long's number 21 car, Nick Smith picked up the $15,000 check for winning the event.

2009: Run on July 11, 2009, the 2009 race saw more cars than the previous year at 27. Nick Smith scored the pole for the race earlier in the day with a 16.346-second lap, merely 0.005 seconds ahead of the second-place car of C.E. Falk III. Smith, now driving for Dave Atkinson, was riding a wave of momentum as the defending race winner and from winning the Bailey's 200 late model race at South Boston Speedway the week before. Smith led the race until lap 22 when Falk III took the lead and held it through the halfway break. Smith's race ended on lap 134 when he and Danny Edwards Jr. made contact going into turn one while racing for third. Edwards Jr. continued on, but Smith spun collecting the 27 car of Greg Edwards. Falk held the lead until lap 183 when Woody Howard took the lead and held it to the checkered flag. Howard netted the $10,000 winner's check in the number 21 car owned by James Long, putting the same car owner in victory lane as the year before, but with a different driver.

2010: Run on July 10, 2010, the 2010 edition of Langley Speedway's richest race began under ominous conditions with short lived showers stopping practice a couple of times early in the afternoon. However, the skies eventually cleared before qualifying began, which saw 23 entrants set times. Former Hampton Heat winner Nick Smith had returned with yet another car owner to attempt the race, but suffered a mechanical failure on his first qualifying lap and did not race. Paul DeBolt set the fastest time of 16.140 seconds, ahead of C.E. Falk, Greg Edwards, Stacy Puryear, and Woody Howard who filled out the top five. The first half of the race featured some early excitement with Falk shoving DeBolt out of the way on lap 13 to take the lead, as well as a heated battle between Stacy Puryear and Mark Wertz that had a lot of bumping and close calls. The first half of the race went caution free until lap 100 when the caution was displayed for the half way break which allowed teams to rotate tires, add fuel, and make adjustments. Falk held the lead through lap 100 and claimed a $100 bonus for being the half way leader. During the break Puryear was interviewed about the on track contact with Wertz which revealed a bit of a pay back may have been in order. The race resumed with all drivers in the same positions they were in at lap 100 and immediately was back under the caution flag as a pile up in turn one damaged the cars of Dean Shiflett and Eddie Johnson, and forced Duane Shreeves out of the race. Once resuming the race it was not long before the caution came out again when Puryear and Wertz bumped again, resulting in Wertz spinning in turn four. Wertz drove up alongside Puryear under caution to voice his displeasure, but nothing more occurred between the two during the remainder of the race. The race continued on another long green flag run during which Falk began to show his dominance, pulling out to a big lead. The dynamic of the race changed quickly with only a few laps to go when Rick Gdovic went for a spin on the backstretch bringing out the final caution of the race. There were less than 10 laps to which meant the cars lined up in single file for the restart instead of the double file restarts used in the first 190 laps. DeBolt attempted to close in on Falk on the restart but Falk got a better restart and was not strongly challenged in the final sprint to the checkers. Falk picked up the $10,000 winner's check.

=== Hampton Heat 200 Winners ===
Year	Winner
2008	Nick Smith
2009	Woody Howard
2010	C.E. Falk III
2011	C.E. Falk III (2)
2012	Matt Bowling
2013	Peyton Sellers
2014	C.E. Falk III (3)
2015	Lee Pulliam
2016	n/a
2017	Bobby McCarty
2018	Philip Morris
2019	Connor Hall
2020	Brenden Queen
2021	Josh Berry
2022	Jared Fryar
2023	Brenden Queen (2)
2024	Brenden Queen (3)
2025	Matt Waltz
2026	Caden Kvapil

== Notable drivers ==
Although NASCAR's premier division has not raced at the track since 1970 it continues to play an integral part in the NASCAR family with several young drivers cutting their teeth on this track every year in the many late model events. Some of the better known graduates include:

- Denny Hamlin – 2016 Daytona 500 winner and Cup Series regular (1997 mini stock track champion)
- Joe Falk – Cup Series team owner was the 1976 Winston Racing track champion at Langley Speedway, and finished second in the Virginia State NASCAR Late Model Sportsman Division.
- C.E. Falk – Son of former NASCAR competitor Eddie Falk and nephew of current team owner Joe Falk

== Tragedy ==
On August 28, 2004, Dale Lemonds was killed in an INEX Legends car race at the track. Three days prior he had signed an agreement to purchase the track from owner Wayne Wyatt. Lemonds' wife Sandy honored the agreement and followed through with purchasing the track. She later renamed victory lane to "Dale Lemonds Victory Lane" in honor of her deceased husband. 64-year-old veteran driver Shawn Balluzzo died in a crash at Langley Speedway on Turn 2 the night of July 11, 2020, in a head-on crash into the barrier (similar to issues with Modifieds). Balluzzo was the winningest driver in the history of the tracks modified division, having amassed 11 Modified championships at the speedway. On April 5, 1980 a spectator, Thomas "Tee" Branch, was killed when a car went airborne and struck him while he was watching the race in the pit area outside the first turn.

== NASCAR Grand National history ==
There were nine NASCAR Grand National events at Langley from 1964 to 1970. The track surface was dirt at the time. David Pearson has the most Grand National victories at Langley with three. The November 1970 season ending Tidewater 300 made its way into a unique place in the history of NASCAR. It was the final Grand National race before the series title was changed to Winston Cup. Bobby Allison won the race, while Bobby Isaac won the championship.

== NASCAR Busch Series events ==
There were 14 NASCAR Busch Series events held at the track between 1982 and 1988. The track had been paved with asphalt since the last Grand National race was held there in 1970. Two drivers dominated the Busch Series events: Jack Ingram claimed four victories, and Tommy Ellis won five.
