= Gio Ruggiero =

American racing driver (born 2006)

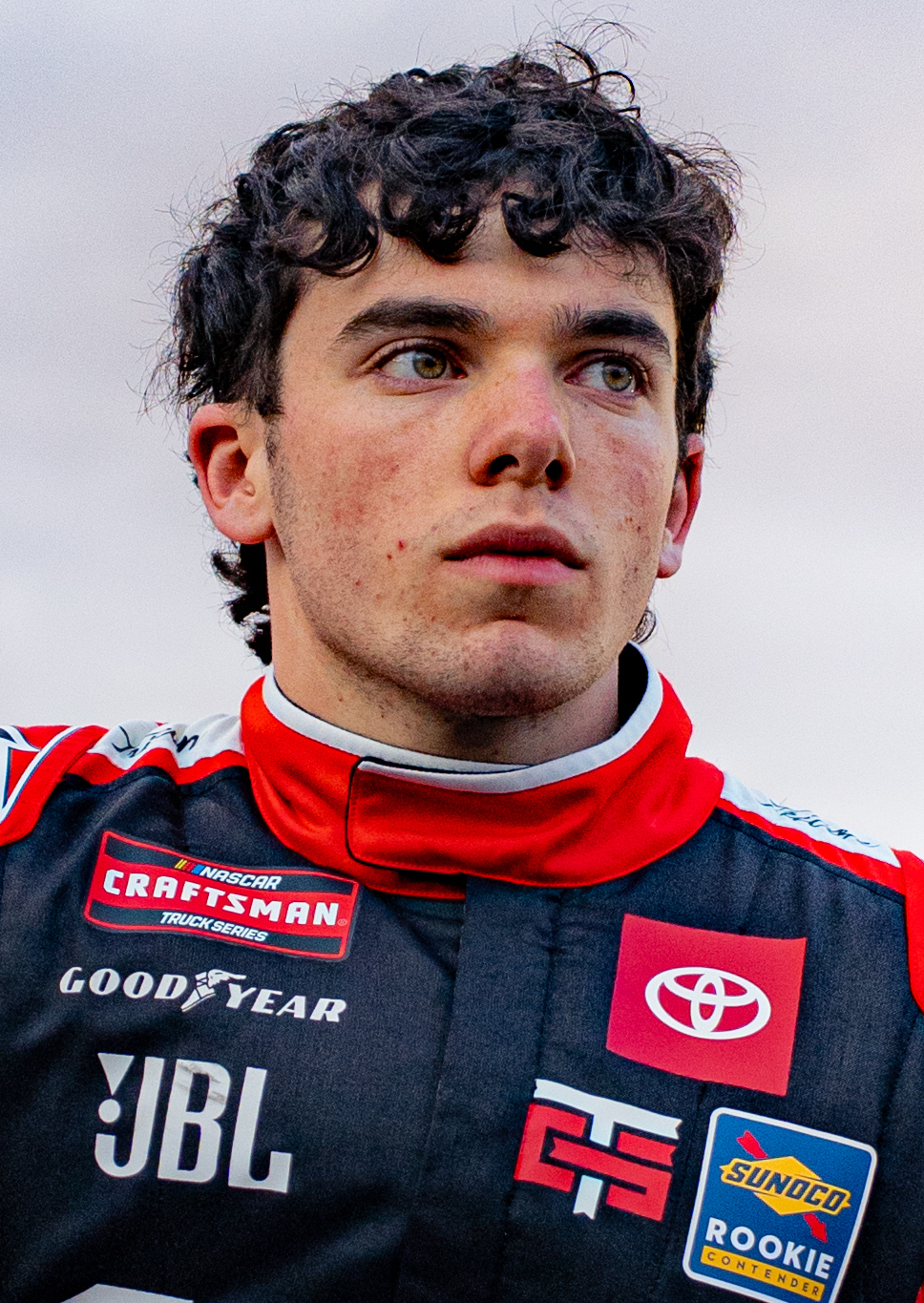
- Ruggiero at Las Vegas Motor Speedway in 2025
- Born: Giovanni Ruggiero; August 29, 2006 (age 20); Seekonk, Massachusetts, U.S.
- Achievements: 2022 Show Me The Money Pro Late Model Series Champion; 2023 Southern Super Series Champion; 2023 CRA Super Series Champion; 2023 Winchester 400 Winner

NASCAR O'Reilly Auto Parts Series career
- 2 races run over 1 year
- 2026 position: 89th
- Best finish: 89th (2026)
- First race: 2026 United Rentals 300 (Daytona)
- Last race: 2026 Bennett Transportation & Logistics 250 (Atlanta)
| Wins | Top tens | Poles |
|---|---|---|
| 0 | 0 | 0 |

NASCAR FedEx Freight Truck Series career
- 50 races run over 2 years
- Truck no., team: No. 17 (Tricon Garage)
- 2026 position: 6th
- Best finish: 6th (2026)
- First race: 2025 Fresh From Florida 250 (Daytona)
- Last race: 2026 Craftsman 200 (Homestead)
- First win: 2025 Love's RV Stop 225 (Talladega)
| Wins | Top tens | Poles |
|---|---|---|
| 1 | 23 | 2 |

ARCA Menards Series career
- 18 races run over 3 years
- Best finish: 13th (2024)
- First race: 2024 General Tire 150 (Phoenix)
- Last race: 2026 Menards 150 (Kansas)
- First win: 2026 General Tire 200 (Daytona)
- Last win: 2026 Sunset Hill Shooting Range 150 (Pocono)
| Wins | Top tens | Poles |
|---|---|---|
| 4 | 17 | 2 |

ARCA Menards Series East career
- 9 races run over 2 years
- Best finish: 3rd (2024)
- First race: 2023 Music City 200 (Nashville Fairgrounds)
- Last race: 2024 Bush's Beans 200 (Bristol)
- First win: 2024 Pensacola 150 (Pensacola)
| Wins | Top tens | Poles |
|---|---|---|
| 1 | 7 | 2 |

ARCA Menards Series West career
- 4 races run over 1 year
- Best finish: 19th (2024)
- First race: 2024 General Tire 150 (Phoenix)
- Last race: 2024 Desert Diamond Casino West Valley 100 (Phoenix)
| Wins | Top tens | Poles |
|---|---|---|
| 0 | 3 | 0 |
- Statistics up to date as of November 7, 2026.

Giovanni Ruggiero (born August 29, 2006) is an American professional stock car racing driver. He competes full-time in the NASCAR Truck Series, driving the No. 17 Toyota Tundra TRD Pro for Tricon Garage. He is a member of Toyota Racing Development.

== Racing career ==
=== Early career ===
Ruggiero began racing Legend cars at a young age, convincing his father to be involved in racing after watching races at Seekonk Speedway in Massachusetts, his home track.

In 2021, Ruggiero began racing at local short tracks in New Hampshire and Massachusetts, winning a race at Hudson Speedway in the process.

=== Late models ===
In 2022, Ruggiero increased his racing schedule and began driving late models across the United States. He ran a full season in the Show Me The Money Pro Late Model Series at Montgomery Motor Speedway, winning two races and eventually the championship. He also ran in the Solid Rock Carriers CARS Pro Late Model Tour, winning in his first career start at Greenville-Pickens Speedway.

In 2023, Ruggiero expanded his schedule further and ran full-time in three different series. He won the championship in both the CRA Super Series and the Southern Super Series that year, and finished third in point standings in the ASA STARS National Tour. He won the Tar Heel 250 at Hickory Motor Speedway after making an aggressive last-lap pass on William Byron for the win. He also won the prestigious Winchester 400 at Winchester Speedway. After the race, Ruggiero was involved in a post-race altercation with Stephen Nasse. With nine laps to go, Ruggiero and Nasse made contact in turn one, forcing Nasse into the outside wall and losing three positions. During the post-race, Stephen's father, Jeff Nasse, was clipped by the side of Ruggiero's car as he attempted to confront him. Three days later, Ruggiero was docked 25 owner and driver points and received a fine of US$3,000. Nasse was docked 44 owner and driver points and received a fine of US$4,500. Both drivers were placed on probation for the remainder of the season.

=== ARCA ===
==== ARCA Menards Series ====
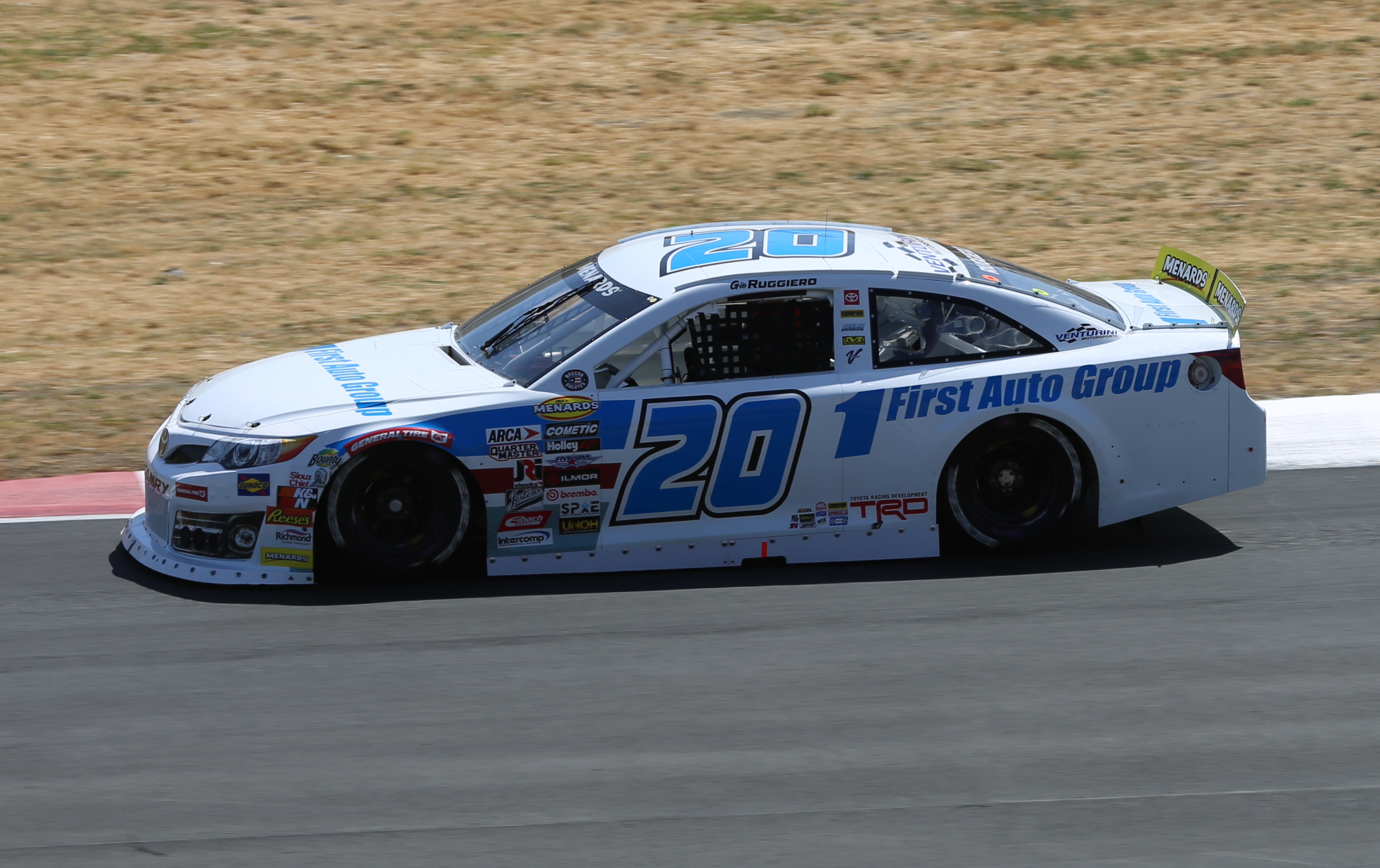
Ruggiero's No. 20 car at Sonoma Raceway in 2024

On December 18, 2023, it was announced that Ruggiero would run a ten-race schedule in the ARCA Menards Series in 2024, driving for Venturini Motorsports in their No. 20 Toyota. He earned three runner-up finishes along with seven top-fives and nine top-tens, including a pole at Iowa.

On January 8, 2025, Joe Gibbs Racing announced their driver lineup for the upcoming season, with Ruggiero running two races in the team's No. 18 car. He ran at Michigan and the Kansas fall race, earning a second-place finish in the Kansas event.

Ruggiero returned to JGR's ARCA program in 2026, running six races, as anchor driver of the car, Max Reaves, was ineligible to race due to his age. Ruggiero won at Daytona, Kansas, a rain-shortened race at Michigan, and Pocono. In his final start of the year at Kansas, after dominating, leading 84 laps, he lost the lead on the final lap to Carson Brown.

==== ARCA Menards Series East ====
On May 11, 2023, it was announced that Ruggiero would make his unexpected debut in the ARCA Menards Series East, driving the No. 20 car for Venturini Motorsports at the Nashville Fairgrounds Speedway. The original driver of the race, Isabella Robusto, suffered from a concussion following a recent late-model wreck and therefore was sidelined from competing. Ruggiero qualified second and ran inside the top-five for the entire race, eventually finishing in fourth.

On December 18, 2023, it was announced that Ruggiero would run full-time in the East Series in 2024, driving the No. 20 for Venturini. He scored his first career win in the season-opener at Five Flags Speedway, passing William Sawalich late in the event and leading the final 71 laps. At Nashville, he scored his first career pole, but blew a tire after six laps and spun, hitting the outside wall. He continued to run until lap 49, before pulling into the garage and retiring from the race, finishing fourteenth. Ruggiero finished the season with one win, five top-fives, and six top-tens, finishing third in the driver standings.

==== ARCA Menards Series West ====
On December 18, 2023, it was announced that Ruggiero would run select races in the ARCA Menards Series West for Venturini Motorsports. He ran four races and earned a best finish of second in the season-opener at Phoenix.

=== NASCAR Craftsman Truck Series ===
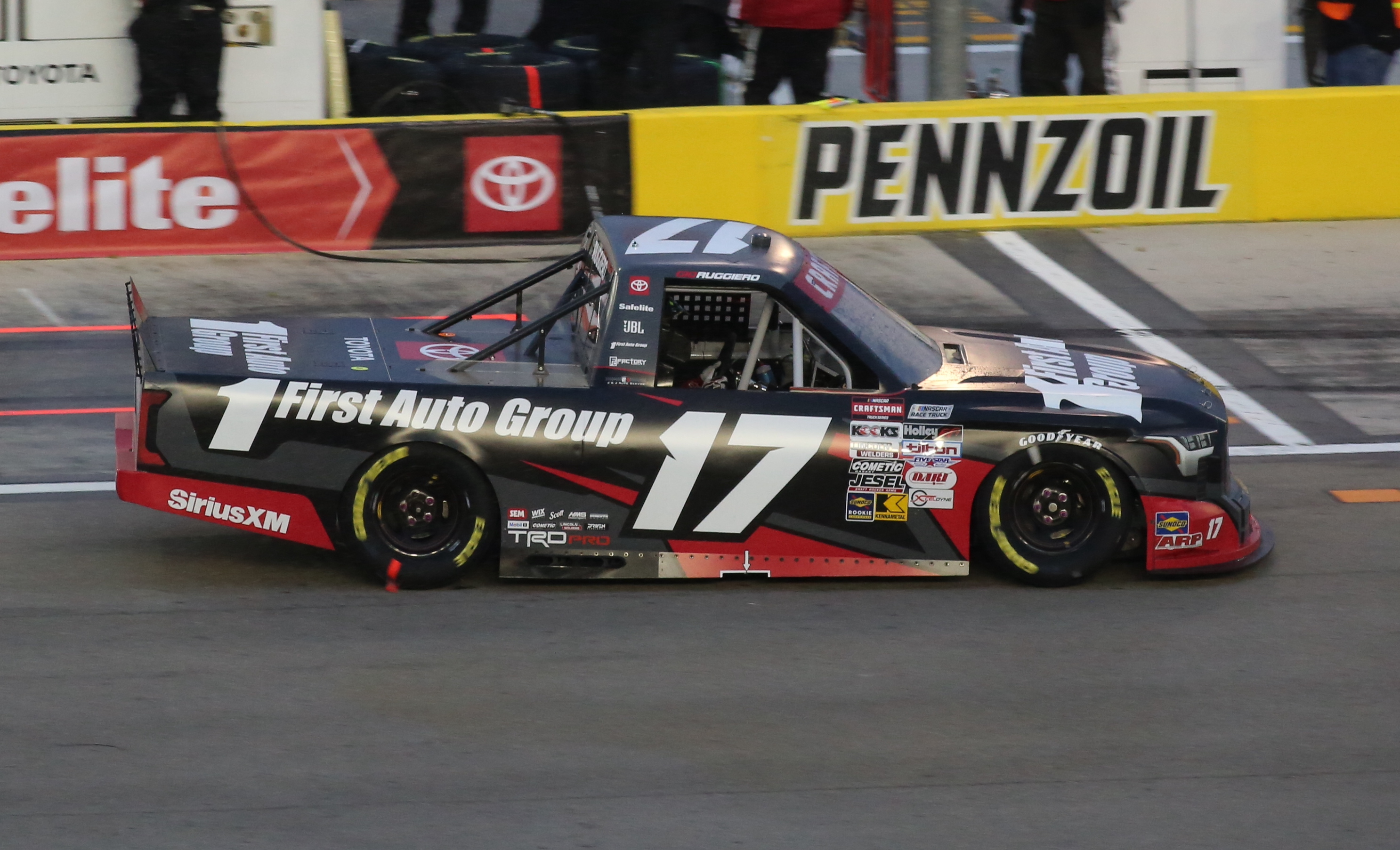
Ruggiero's No. 17 truck at Las Vegas Motor Speedway in 2025

==== 2025 ====
On December 2, 2024, it was announced that Ruggiero would move up to the NASCAR Craftsman Truck Series in the 2025 season, driving the No. 17 Toyota for Tricon Garage, replacing Taylor Gray, who moved up to the Xfinity Series full-time. Ruggiero started the 2025 season with a second-place finish at Daytona. Despite not making the playoffs, he scored his first career win at Talladega. At season's end, Ruggiero finished 11th in points and won Rookie of the Year honors.

==== 2026 ====
On December 18, 2025, Tricon Garage announced that Ruggiero will return to the team and drive the No. 17 for the 2026 season. Ruggiero started the 2026 season with a runner-up finish at Daytona. He accumulated enough points to clinch a spot in "The Chase".

=== NASCAR O'Reilly Auto Parts Series ===
==== 2026 ====
On February 4, 2026, it was announced that Ruggiero will make his debut in the NASCAR O'Reilly Auto Parts Series, running the No. 19 for JGR in the season-opener at Daytona and Atlanta in place for Brent Crews, as he had yet to turn 18 years old. In his first race with the team, he was involved in an incident, finishing with a 37th place DNF. At Atlanta, he finished 24th.

== Motorsports career results ==
=== Stock car career summary ===
| Season | Series | Team | Races | Wins | Top 5 | Top 10 | Points | Position |
|---|---|---|---|---|---|---|---|---|
| 2022 | CARS Pro Late Model Tour | N/A | 2 | 1 | 2 | 2 | 67 | 15th |
| 2023 | ASA STARS National Tour | Wilson Motorsports | 10 | 2 | 3 | 7 | 573 | **3rd** |
| 2023 | CARS Pro Late Model Tour | N/A | 3 | 0 | 3 | 3 | 86 | 22nd |
| 2023 | CARS Late Model Stock Car Tour | N/A | 2 | 0 | 0 | 0 | 25 | 46th |
| 2023 | ARCA Menards Series East | Venturini Motorsports | 1 | 0 | 1 | 1 | 40 | 29th |
| 2024 | ASA STARS National Tour | Wilson Motorsports | 8 | 0 | 5 | 7 | 531 | 6th |
| 2024 | CARS Pro Late Model Tour | Wilson Motorsports | 1 | 0 | 0 | 0 | 0 | N/A |
| 2024 | CARS Late Model Stock Car Tour | Lee Pulliam Performance | 2 | 0 | 0 | 1 | 0 | N/A |
| 2024 | ARCA Menards Series West | Venturini Motorsports | 4 | 0 | 3 | 3 | 141 | 20th |
| 2024 | ARCA Menards Series East | Venturini Motorsports | 8 | 1 | 5 | 6 | 402 | **3rd** |
| 2024 | ARCA Menards Series | Venturini Motorsports | 10 | 0 | 7 | 9 | 393 | 13th |
| 2025 | ARCA Menards Series | Joe Gibbs Racing | 2 | 0 | 2 | 2 | 85 | 52nd |
| 2025 | NASCAR Craftsman Truck Series | Tricon Garage | 25 | 1 | 7 | 11 | 703 | 11th |
| 2026 | CARS Pro Late Model Tour | Monahan Motorsports | 1 | 0 | 0 | 0 | 29 | 52nd |
| 2026 | ARCA Menards Series | Joe Gibbs Racing | 6 | 4 | 6 | 6 | 275 | 18th |
| 2026 | NASCAR Craftsman Truck Series | Tricon Garage | 25 | 0 | 4 | 12 | 2252 | 6th |
| 2026 | NASCAR O'Reilly Auto Parts Series | Joe Gibbs Racing | 2 | 0 | 0 | 0 | 0 | NC† |

^{†} As Ruggiero was a guest driver, he was ineligible for championship points.

=== NASCAR ===
(key) (Bold – Pole position awarded by qualifying time. Italics – Pole position earned by points standings or practice time. * – Most laps led.)

==== O'Reilly Auto Parts Series ====
NASCAR O'Reilly Auto Parts Series results
| Year | Team | No. | Make | 1 | 2 | 3 | 4 | 5 | 6 | 7 | 8 | 9 | 10 | 11 | 12 | 13 | 14 | 15 | 16 | 17 | 18 | 19 | 20 | 21 | 22 | 23 | 24 | 25 | 26 | 27 | 28 | 29 | 30 | 31 | 32 | 33 | NOAPSC | Pts | Ref |
|---|---|---|---|---|---|---|---|---|---|---|---|---|---|---|---|---|---|---|---|---|---|---|---|---|---|---|---|---|---|---|---|---|---|---|---|---|---|---|---|
| 2026 | Joe Gibbs Racing | 19 | Toyota | DAY; 37 | ATL; 24 | COA | PHO | LVS | DAR | MAR | CAR | BRI | KAN | TAL | TEX | GLN | DOV | CLT | NSH | POC | COR | SON | CHI | ATL | IND | IOW | DAY | DAR | GTW | BRI | LVS | CLT | PHO | TAL | MAR | HOM | 89th | 0^{1} | |

==== Truck Series ====
NASCAR Truck Series results
| Year | Team | No. | Make | 1 | 2 | 3 | 4 | 5 | 6 | 7 | 8 | 9 | 10 | 11 | 12 | 13 | 14 | 15 | 16 | 17 | 18 | 19 | 20 | 21 | 22 | 23 | 24 | 25 | NTSC | Pts | Ref |
|---|---|---|---|---|---|---|---|---|---|---|---|---|---|---|---|---|---|---|---|---|---|---|---|---|---|---|---|---|---|---|---|
| 2025 | Tricon Garage | 17 | Toyota | DAY; 2 | ATL; 11 | LVS; 15 | HOM; 29 | MAR; 12 | BRI; 10 | CAR; 10 | TEX; 31 | KAN; 4 | NWS; 7 | **CLT**; 21 | NSH; 13 | MCH; 12 | POC; 11 | LRP; 3 | IRP; 25 | GLN; 3 | RCH; 6 | DAR; 22 | BRI; 13 | NHA; 4 | ROV; 3 | **TAL**; 1* | MAR; 11 | PHO; 31 | 11th | 703 | |
| 2026 | Tricon Garage | 17 | Toyota | DAY; 2 | ATL; 3 | STP; 25 | DAR; 8 | CAR; 17 | BRI; 3 | TEX; 14 | GLN; 15 | DOV; 20 | CLT; 5 | NSH; 9 | MCH; 12 | COR; 10 | LRP; 20 | NWS; 6 | IRP; 13 | RCH; 9 | NHA; 26 | BRI; 6 | KAN; 13 | CLT; 26 | PHO; 8 | TAL; 25 | MAR; 8 | HOM; 11 | 6th | 2252 | |
| 2027 | Tricon Garage | 17 | Toyota | DAY | ATL | STP | DAR | BRI | TEX | KAN | NWS | CLT | NSS | POC | MCH | LRP | ATL | IRP | BRI | BGS | MSP | NHA | KAN | CLT | PHO | TAL | MAR | HOM | | | |

^{*} Season still in progress
^{1} Ineligible for series points

=== ARCA Menards Series ===
(key) (Bold – Pole position awarded by qualifying time. Italics – Pole position earned by points standings or practice time. * – Most laps led. ** – All laps led.)

ARCA Menards Series results
| Year | Team | No. | Make | 1 | 2 | 3 | 4 | 5 | 6 | 7 | 8 | 9 | 10 | 11 | 12 | 13 | 14 | 15 | 16 | 17 | 18 | 19 | 20 | AMSC | Pts | Ref |
|---|---|---|---|---|---|---|---|---|---|---|---|---|---|---|---|---|---|---|---|---|---|---|---|---|---|---|
| 2024 | Venturini Motorsports | 20 | Toyota | DAY | PHO; 2 | TAL | DOV; 2 | KAN | CLT | **IOW**; 3 | MOH; 3 | BLN | IRP; 5 | SLM | ELK | MCH | ISF | MLW; 9 | DSF | GLN; 6 | BRI; 15 | KAN; 5 | TOL; 2 | 13th | 393 | |
| 2025 | Joe Gibbs Racing | 18 | Toyota | DAY | PHO | TAL | KAN | CLT | MCH; 4 | BLN | ELK | LRP | DOV | IRP | IOW | GLN | ISF | MAD | DSF | BRI | SLM | KAN; 2* | TOL | 52nd | 85 | |
| 2026 | Joe Gibbs Racing | 18 | Toyota | DAY; 1 | PHO | KAN; 1* | TAL; 5* | GLN | TOL | MCH; 1 | POC; 1* | BER | ELK | CHI | LRP | IRP | IOW | ISF | MAD | DSF | SLM | BRI | KAN; 2* | 18th | 275 | |

==== ARCA Menards Series East ====
ARCA Menards Series East results
| Year | Team | No. | Make | 1 | 2 | 3 | 4 | 5 | 6 | 7 | 8 | AMSEC | Pts | Ref |
|---|---|---|---|---|---|---|---|---|---|---|---|---|---|---|
| 2023 | Venturini Motorsports | 20 | Toyota | FIF | DOV | NSV; 4 | FRS | IOW | IRP | MLW | BRI | 29th | 40 | |
| 2024 | Venturini Motorsports | 20 | Toyota | FIF; 1 | DOV; 2 | **NSV**; 14 | FRS; 3 | **IOW**; 3 | IRP; 5 | MLW; 9 | BRI; 15 | 3rd | 402 | |

==== ARCA Menards Series West ====
ARCA Menards Series West results
| Year | Team | No. | Make | 1 | 2 | 3 | 4 | 5 | 6 | 7 | 8 | 9 | 10 | 11 | 12 | AMSWC | Pts | Ref |
|---|---|---|---|---|---|---|---|---|---|---|---|---|---|---|---|---|---|---|
| 2024 | Venturini Motorsports | 20 | Toyota | PHO; 2 | KER | PIR; 5 | SON; 25 | IRW | IRW | SHA | TRI | MAD | AAS | KER | PHO; 4 | 20th | 141 | |

=== CARS Late Model Stock Car Tour ===
(key) (Bold – Pole position awarded by qualifying time. Italics – Pole position earned by points standings or practice time. * – Most laps led. ** – All laps led.)

CARS Late Model Stock Car Tour results
| Year | Team | No. | Make | 1 | 2 | 3 | 4 | 5 | 6 | 7 | 8 | 9 | 10 | 11 | 12 | 13 | 14 | 15 | 16 | 17 | CLMSCTC | Pts | Ref |
|---|---|---|---|---|---|---|---|---|---|---|---|---|---|---|---|---|---|---|---|---|---|---|---|
| 2023 | N/A | 5C | Toyota | SNM | FLC | HCY | ACE | NWS | LGY | DOM | CRW | HCY | ACE | TCM | WKS; 21 | AAS | SBO | TCM; 20 | CRW | | 46th | 25 | |
| 2024 | Lee Pulliam Performance | 55 | Toyota | SNM | HCY; 29 | AAS | OCS | ACE | TCM | LGY | DOM | CRW | HCY | | | | | | | | N/A | 0 | |
| 2024 | Lee Pulliam Performance | 22R | Toyota | | | | | | | | | | | NWS; 6 | ACE | WCS | FLC | SBO | TCM | NWS | N/A | 0 | |

=== CARS Pro Late Model Tour ===
(key)

CARS Pro Late Model Tour results
| Year | Team | No. | Make | 1 | 2 | 3 | 4 | 5 | 6 | 7 | 8 | 9 | 10 | 11 | 12 | 13 | CPLMTC | Pts | Ref |
|---|---|---|---|---|---|---|---|---|---|---|---|---|---|---|---|---|---|---|---|
| 2022 | N/A | 81 | Ford | CRW | HCY | **GPS**; 1** | FCS | TCM; 2 | HCY | ACE | MMS | TCM | ACE | SBO | CRW | | 15th | 67 | |
| 2023 | N/A | 24 | Toyota | SNM | HCY | ACE | NWS | TCM; 5 | | | | | | | | | 22nd | 86 | |
| 2023 | N/A | 28 | Toyota | | | | | | DIL; 4 | CRW | WKS; 5 | HCY | TCM | SBO | TCM | CRW | 22nd | 86 | |
| 2024 | Wilson Motorsports | 24 | Toyota | SNM | HCY | OCS | ACE | TCM | CRW | HCY | NWS | ACE | FLC | SBO | TCM | NWS; 16 | N/A | 0 | |
| 2026 | Monahan Motorsports | 55 | Toyota | SNM | NSV | CRW | ACE | NWS; 13 | HCY | AND | FLC | TCM | NPS | SBO | | | 52nd | 29 | |

=== ASA STARS National Tour ===
(key) (Bold – Pole position awarded by qualifying time. Italics – Pole position earned by points standings or practice time. * – Most laps led. ** – All laps led.)

ASA STARS National Tour results
| Year | Team | No. | Make | 1 | 2 | 3 | 4 | 5 | 6 | 7 | 8 | 9 | 10 | ASNTC | Pts | Ref |
|---|---|---|---|---|---|---|---|---|---|---|---|---|---|---|---|---|
| 2023 | Wilson Motorsports | 22R | Toyota | FIF; 15 | MAD; 6 | | | | | WIR; 6 | | | | 3rd | 573 | |
| 2023 | Wilson Motorsports | 22 | Toyota | | | NWS; 29 | HCY; 1 | MLW; 6 | AND; 2 | | TOL; 9 | WIN; 1 | NSV; 26 | 3rd | 573 | |
| 2024 | Wilson Motorsports | 22 | Toyota | NSM; 5 | FIF; 3 | HCY; 17 | MAD | MLW; 7 | AND; 3 | OWO | TOL; 2 | WIN; 10 | NSV; 4 | 6th | 531 | |
