= Brandon Hanks =

American racing driver

- Born: October 25, 1995 (age 31) Burlison, Tennessee, U.S.

CARS Late Model Stock Tour career
- Debut season: 2026
- Years active: 2026–present
- Starts: 1
- Championships: 0
- Wins: 0
- Poles: 0
- Best finish: 71st in 2026
- Statistics up to date as of October 27, 2026.

Brandon Hanks (born October 25, 1995) is an American professional stock car and dirt track racing driver. He currently competes in the zMAX CARS Tour, driving the No. 84 for Hanks Motorsports.

Hanks has also competed in series such as the World of Outlaws, the American Sprint Cars Series, where he won the championship in the Red River division in 2016, and the IHRA Stock Car Series. He also made an attempt to qualify for the Chili Bowl Nationals in 2018, where he failed to qualify.

== Motorsports results ==
=== CARS Late Model Stock Car Tour ===
(key) (Bold – Pole position awarded by qualifying time. Italics – Pole position earned by points standings or practice time. * – Most laps led. ** – All laps led.)

CARS Late Model Stock Car Tour results
| Year | Team | No. | Make | 1 | 2 | 3 | 4 | 5 | 6 | 7 | 8 | 9 | 10 | 11 | 12 | 13 | 14 | CLMSCTC | Pts | Ref |
|---|---|---|---|---|---|---|---|---|---|---|---|---|---|---|---|---|---|---|---|---|
| 2026 | Hanks Motorsports | 84 | Chevy | SNM | WCS | NSV | CRW | ACE | LGY | DOM | NWS | HCY | AND; 18 | FLC | TCM | NPS | SBO | 71st | 24 | |

=== IHRA Late Model Sportsman Series ===
(key) (Bold – Pole position awarded by qualifying time. Italics – Pole position earned by points standings or practice time. * – Most laps led. ** – All laps led.)

IHRA Late Model Sportsman Series
| Year | Team | No. | Make | 1 | 2 | 3 | ISCSS | Pts | Ref |
|---|---|---|---|---|---|---|---|---|---|
| 2026 | Hanks Motorsports | 84 | Chevy | DUB; 22 | CDL; 8 | AND; 20 | 11th | 91 | |
