= Carter Langley =

American racing driver

- Born: 2004 or 2005 (age 21–22) Zebulon, North Carolina, U.S.

CARS Late Model Stock Tour career
- Debut season: 2021
- Years active: 2021–2023, 2026–present
- Starts: 19
- Championships: 0
- Wins: 0
- Poles: 0
- Best finish: 13th in 2022
- Statistics up to date as of March 30, 2026.

Carter Langley (born 2004 or 2005) is an American professional stock car racing driver who competes in the zMAX CARS Tour, driving the No. 77 for LSH Racing. He had previously competed in the series from 2021 to 2023.

Langley has also competed in series such as the Virginia Late Model Triple Crown Series, the Carolina Pro Late Model Series, the Southeast Limited Late Model Series, and the NASCAR Weekly Series, and is a former track champion at South Boston Speedway.

== Motorsports results ==
=== CARS Late Model Stock Car Tour ===
(key) (Bold – Pole position awarded by qualifying time. Italics – Pole position earned by points standings or practice time. * – Most laps led. ** – All laps led.)

CARS Late Model Stock Car Tour results
Year	Team	No.	Make	1	2	3	4	5	6	7	8	9	10	11	12	13	14	15	16	CLMSCTC	Pts	Ref
2021	Justin Johnson	5L	Ford	DIL	HCY	OCS	ACE	CRW	LGY	DOM	HCY	MMS	TCM; 10	FLC	WKS					25th	50	
2021	Justin Johnson	5	Ford													SBO; 6				25th	50	
2022	Justin Johnson	5	Ford	CRW; 7	HCY; 10	GPS; 7	AAS; 22	FCS; 16	LGY; 18	DOM; 13			MMS; 10	NWS; 30	TCM; 20	ACE; 10	SBO; 15	CRW; 15		13th	275	
2022	Justin Johnson	2	Ford								HCY; 19									13th	275	
2022	Justin Johnson	5	Chevy									ACE; 8								13th	275	
2023	N/A	5CL	Chevy	SNM	FLC	HCY	ACE	NWS	LGY	DOM	CRW	HCY	ACE	TCM	WKS	AAS	SBO; 27	TCM	CRW	84th	6	
2026	LSH Racing	77	Chevy	SNM	WCS; 25	NSV	CRW	ACE	LGY	DOM	NWS	HCY	AND	FLC	TCM	NPS	SBO			87th	17	

=== CARS Pro Late Model Tour ===
(key)

CARS Pro Late Model Tour results
Year	Team	No.	Make	1	2	3	4	5	6	7	8	9	10	11	12	13	CPLMTC	Pts	Ref
2023	N/A	24	Chevy	SNM; 15	HCY	ACE	NWS	TCM	DIL	CRW	WKS	HCY	TCM	SBO	TCM	CRW	58th	18	
