= Jeff Batten =

American racing driver

- Born: October 25, 1985 (age 41) Nashville, North Carolina, U.S.

CARS Pro Late Model Tour career
- Debut season: 2022
- Years active: 2022–present
- Starts: 15
- Championships: 0
- Wins: 0
- Poles: 0
- Best finish: 15th in 2026
- Statistics up to date as of October 27, 2026.

Jeff Batten (born October 25, 1985) is an American professional stock car racing driver. He currently competes in the zMAX CARS Tour, driving the No. 49 for B&J Racing. He is a longtime competitor in the series, having first competed in the now defunct Super Late Model Tour from 2015 to 2021.

Batten has also competed in series such as the ASA CRA Super Series, the PASS Pro Late Model Series, the ASA Southern Super Series, and the South Atlantic Pro Series.

== Motorsports results ==
=== CARS Super Late Model Tour ===
(key)

CARS Super Late Model Tour results
| Year | Team | No. | Make | 1 | 2 | 3 | 4 | 5 | 6 | 7 | 8 | 9 | 10 | 11 | 12 | 13 | CSLMTC | Pts | Ref |
|---|---|---|---|---|---|---|---|---|---|---|---|---|---|---|---|---|---|---|---|
| 2015 | Bobby Batten | 48 | N/A | SNM | ROU | HCY | SNM | TCM | MMS | ROU | CON | MYB | HCY; 12 | | | | 49th | 21 | |
| 2016 | Bobby Batten | 49 | Chevy | SNM; 16 | ROU; 20 | HCY; 17 | TCM; 15 | GRE | ROU; 23 | CON; 15 | MYB; 16 | HCY; 6 | SNM; 14 | | | | 8th | 155 | |
| 2017 | Jeff Batten | 49 | Chevy | CON | DOM | DOM | HCY; 8 | HCY; 8 | BRI | AND | ROU; 14 | TCM | ROU; 10 | HCY; 8 | CON; 9 | SBO; 9 | 8th | 165 | |
| 2018 | Bobby Batten | 49 | Chevy | MYB; 4 | NSH | ROU; 18 | HCY; 6 | BRI | AND; 15 | | ROU; 12 | SBO; 6 | | | | | 6th | 150 | |
| 2018 | Bobby Batten | 2B | Chevy | | | | | | | HCY; 20 | | | | | | | 6th | 150 | |
| 2019 | B&J Racing | 49 | Chevy | SNM; 26 | HCY; 16 | NSH | MMS; 7 | BRI | | ROU; 11 | SBO; 12 | | | | | | 11th | 109 | |
| 2019 | B&J Racing | 11 | Chevy | | | | | | HCY; 17 | | | | | | | | 11th | 109 | |
| 2020 | Bobby Batten | 49 | Chevy | SNM; 11 | HCY; 13 | JEN; 16 | HCY; 7 | FCS; 9 | BRI; 21 | FLC; 7 | NSH | | | | | | 6th | 147 | |
| 2021 | Bobby Batten | 49 | Chevy | HCY; 9 | GPS; 10 | NSH; 20 | JEN; 9 | HCY; 10 | MMS; 5 | TCM; 12 | SBO; 6 | | | | | | 3rd | 183 | |

=== CARS Pro Late Model Tour ===
(key)

CARS Pro Late Model Tour results
| Year | Team | No. | Make | 1 | 2 | 3 | 4 | 5 | 6 | 7 | 8 | 9 | 10 | 11 | 12 | 13 | CPLMTC | Pts | Ref |
|---|---|---|---|---|---|---|---|---|---|---|---|---|---|---|---|---|---|---|---|
| 2022 | B&J Racing | 49 | Chevy | CRW; 7 | HCY; 11 | GPS | FCS | TCM | HCY | ACE | MMS | TCM | ACE | SBO | CRW | | 24th | 48 | |
| 2023 | B&J Racing | 48 | Chevy | SNM; 22 | HCY; 24 | ACE; 23 | NWS | TCM | DIL | CRW | WKS | | | | | | 31st | 52 | |
| 2023 | B&J Racing | 49 | Chevy | | | | | | | | | HCY; 11 | TCM | SBO | TCM | CRW | 31st | 52 | |
| 2024 | B&J Racing | 49 | Chevy | SNM; 28 | HCY; 27 | OCS | ACE | TCM | CRW | HCY | NWS | ACE | FLC | SBO | TCM | NWS | N/A | 0 | |
| 2025 | B&J Racing | 49 | Chevy | AAS | CDL | OCS | ACE | NWS | CRW | HCY | HCY; 18 | AND | FLC | SBO | TCM | NWS | 73rd | 24 | |
| 2026 | B&J Racing | 49 | Chevy | SNM; 19 | NSV | CRW; 21 | ACE; 15 | NWS | HCY; 12 | AND | FLC; 15 | TCM; Wth | NPS | SBO; 19 | | | 15th | 153 | |
