= Riley Gentry =

American racing driver

- Born: June 11, 1999 (age 27) Easley, South Carolina, U.S.

CARS Late Model Stock Tour career
- Debut season: 2020
- Years active: 2020, 2022–2023, 2025–present
- Starts: 12
- Championships: 0
- Wins: 0
- Poles: 0
- Best finish: 37th in 2026
- Statistics up to date as of October 27, 2026.

Riley Gentry (born June 11, 1999) is an American professional stock car racing driver. He currently competes in the zMAX CARS Tour, driving the No. 09 for Riley Gentry Racing.

Gentry has also competed in the Virginia Late Model Triple Crown Series, the All-Pro Limited Late Model Series, the I-95 Showdown Series, and the NASCAR Weekly Series.

== Motorsports results ==
=== CARS Late Model Stock Car Tour ===
(key) (Bold – Pole position awarded by qualifying time. Italics – Pole position earned by points standings or practice time. * – Most laps led. ** – All laps led.)

CARS Late Model Stock Car Tour results
Year	Team	No.	Make	1	2	3	4	5	6	7	8	9	10	11	12	13	14	15	16	CLMSCTC	Pts	Ref
2020	Riley Gentry	09	Toyota	SNM	ACE	HCY	HCY	DOM	FCS	LGY	CCS	FLO	GRE; 25							58th	8	
2022	Riley Gentry	09	Toyota	CRW	HCY	GRE; 14	AAS	FCS	LGY	DOM	HCY	ACE	MMS	NWS	TCM	ACE	SBO	CRW		55th	19	
2023	Riley Gentry	09	Toyota	SNM	FLC	HCY; 28	ACE	NWS	LGY	DOM	CRW			TCM; 23	WKS	AAS	SBO	TCM; 29	CRW	44th	25	
2023	Riley Gentry	09N	Toyota									HCY; 27	ACE							44th	25	
2025	Riley Gentry Racing	09	N/A	AAS	WCS	CDL	OCS	ACE	NWS; 9	LGY	DOM	CRW	HCY	AND; 25	FLC	SBO	TCM	NWS		45th	50	
2026	Riley Gentry Racing	09	N/A	SNM; 19	WCS; DNQ	NSV; 27	CRW; DNQ	ACE	LGY	DOM	NWS	HCY	AND; 14	FLC	TCM; 23	NPS	SBO			37th	95	
