= Case James =

American racing driver

- Born: Newton, North Carolina, U.S.

CARS Pro Late Model Tour career
- Debut season: 2025
- Years active: 2025–present
- Starts: 13
- Championships: 0
- Wins: 0
- Poles: 0
- Best finish: 8th in 2026
- Statistics up to date as of October 21, 2026.

Case James is an American professional stock car racing driver. He currently competes in the zMAX CARS Tour, driving the No. 15 Chevrolet for his own team, Case James Racing. He is the son of former late model driver Cole James.

James first began racing at the age of five in quarter midgets, where he won over 300 races and 32 championships.

James has also competed in series such as the NASCAR Youth Series, where he won eight championships across multiple divisions, the INEX Nashville Spring Series, the INEX Summer Shootout, and the Thursday Thunder Legends Racing Series.

== Motorsports results ==
=== CARS Pro Late Model Tour ===
(key)

CARS Pro Late Model Tour results
Year	Team	No.	Make	1	2	3	4	5	6	7	8	9	10	11	12	13	CPLMTC	Pts	Ref
2025	Case James Racing	15	Chevy	AAS	CDL	OCS	ACE	NWS	CRW	HCY	HCY	AND	FLC; 9	SBO	TCM; 18	NWS	37th	57	
2026	Case James Racing	15	Chevy	SNM; 6	NSV; 17	CRW; 7	ACE; 12	NWS; 9	HCY; 22	AND; 11	FLC; 19	TCM; 8	NPS; 9	SBO; 17			8th	326	
