= Dylan Newsome =

American racing driver

- Born: Goldsboro, North Carolina, U.S.

CARS Late Model Stock Tour career
- Debut season: 2026
- Years active: 2026–present
- Starts: 1
- Championships: 0
- Wins: 0
- Poles: 0
- Best finish: 70th in 2026
- Statistics up to date as of October 27, 2026.

Dylan Newsome (birth date unknown) is an American professional stock car racing driver. He currently competes in the zMAX CARS Tour, driving the No. 44 for Newsome Family Racing.

Newsome has also competed in series such as the IHRA Stock Car Series, Virginia Late Model Triple Crown Series, the I-95 Showdown Series, and the NASCAR Local Racing Series.

== Motorsports results ==
=== CARS Late Model Stock Car Tour ===
(key) (Bold – Pole position awarded by qualifying time. Italics – Pole position earned by points standings or practice time. * – Most laps led. ** – All laps led.)

CARS Late Model Stock Car Tour results
Year	Team	No.	Make	1	2	3	4	5	6	7	8	9	10	11	12	13	14	CLMSCTC	Pts	Ref
2026	Newsome Family Racing	44	Chevy	SNM	WCS	NSV	CRW	ACE	LGY	DOM	NWS	HCY; 18	AND	FLC	TCM	NPS	SBO	70th	24	

=== IHRA Late Model Sportsman Series ===
(key) (Bold – Pole position awarded by qualifying time. Italics – Pole position earned by points standings or practice time. * – Most laps led. ** – All laps led.)

IHRA Late Model Sportsman Series
Year	Team	No.	Make	1	2	3	ISCSS	Pts	Ref
2026	Newsome Family Racing	44	Chevy	DUB; 6	CDL; 4	AND; 3	1st	129	
