= Jimmy Renfrew Jr. =

American racing driver

- Born: March 25, 2003 (age 23) Hooksett, New Hampshire, U.S.

CARS Pro Late Model Tour career
- Debut season: 2023
- Years active: 2023–2024, 2026–present
- Starts: 16
- Championships: 0
- Wins: 1
- Poles: 0
- Best finish: 4th in 2024
- Statistics up to date as of September 15, 2026.

Jimmy Renfrew Jr. (born March 25, 2003) is an American professional stock car racing driver. He currently competes in the zMAX CARS Tour, driving the No. 22R Toyota for Black Diamond Industries.

In 2024, Renfrew got his first career win in the CARS Pro Late Model Tour at Hickory Motor Speedway; he also won rookie of the year honors that year.

Renfrew has also competed in series such as the ACT Late Model Tour, the Granite State Pro Stock Series, the World Series of Asphalt Stock Car Racing, and the NASCAR Local Racing Series, and is a former track champion at Hudson Speedway.

== Motorsports results ==
=== CARS Pro Late Model Tour ===
(key)

CARS Pro Late Model Tour results
Year	Team	No.	Make	1	2	3	4	5	6	7	8	9	10	11	12	13	CPLMTC	Pts	Ref
2023	Wilson Motorsports	28	Toyota	SNM	HCY	ACE	NWS	TCM	DIL	CRW	WKS	HCY	TCM	SBO	TCM	CRW; 3	44th	30	
2024	Wilson Motorsports	00	Toyota	SNM; 2	HCY; 6	OCS; 15	ACE; 10	TCM; 4	CRW; 4	HCY; 1	NWS; 10	ACE; 5			TCM; 5	NWS; 4	4th	346	
2024	Wilson Motorsports	00R	Toyota										FLC; 11				4th	346	
2024	Wilson Motorsports	00J	Toyota											SBO; 8			4th	346	
2026	Black Diamond Industries	22R	Toyota	SNM	NSV	CRW	ACE	NWS	HCY	AND; 5	FLC; 16	TCM	NPS	SBO			29th	63	

=== IHRA Pro Late Model Series ===
(key) (Bold – Pole position awarded by qualifying time. Italics – Pole position earned by points standings or practice time. * – Most laps led. ** – All laps led.)

IHRA Pro Late Model Series
Year	Team	No.	Make	1	2	3	ISCSS	Pts	Ref
2026	N/A	22R	N/A	DUB	CDL	AND; 1	N/A	0	
