= Mason Bailey =

American racing driver

- Born: 1995 or 1996 (age 30–31) Richmond, Virginia, U.S.

CARS Late Model Stock Tour career
- Debut season: 2023
- Years active: 2023–present
- Starts: 15
- Championships: 0
- Wins: 0
- Poles: 1
- Best finish: 26th in 2026
- Statistics up to date as of October 27, 2026.

Mason Bailey (born 1996 or 1997) is an American professional stock car racing driver who currently competes in the zMAX CARS Tour, driving the No. 05 for Alpha Sports.

Bailey has also competed in the Virginia Late Model Triple Crown Series, the I-95 Showdown Series, and the NASCAR Weekly Series.

== Career ==
Bailey is a former student at High Point University.

== Motorsports results ==
=== CARS Late Model Stock Car Tour ===
(key) (Bold – Pole position awarded by qualifying time. Italics – Pole position earned by points standings or practice time. * – Most laps led. ** – All laps led.)

CARS Late Model Stock Car Tour results
Year	Team	No.	Make	1	2	3	4	5	6	7	8	9	10	11	12	13	14	15	16	17	CLMSCTC	Pts	Ref
2023	Alpha Sports	05	Chevy	SNM	FLC	HCY	ACE	NWS	LGY	DOM	CRW	HCY	ACE	TCM	WKS; 10	AAS	SBO	TCM	CRW		51st	23	
2024	Alpha Sports	05	Chevy	SNM	HCY	AAS	OCS; 28	ACE	TCM	LGY	DOM; 19	CRW	HCY	NWS	ACE	**WCS**; 6	FLC	SBO	TCM	NWS	N/A	0	
2025	Alpha Sports	05	Chevy	AAS	WCS; 17	CDL	OCS; DNQ	ACE; 22	NWS	LGY	DOM; 21	CRW	HCY; DNS	AND	FLC	SBO; 25	TCM	NWS			30th	88	
2026	Alpha Sports	05	Chevy	SNM; 11	WCS; DNQ	NSV; 22	CRW; 21	ACE; 21	LGY; 23	DOM; 24	NWS	HCY	AND	FLC	TCM	NPS	SBO; 22				26th	155	
