= Ryley Music =

American racing driver

Ryler Music
- Born: Norfolk, Virginia, U.S.

CARS Late Model Stock Tour career
- Debut season: 2023
- Years active: 2023, 2025–present
- Starts: 4
- Championships: 0
- Wins: 0
- Poles: 0
- Best finish: 47th in 2025
- Statistics up to date as of May 31, 2026.

Ryley Music (birth date unknown) is an American professional stock car racing driver. He currently competes in the zMAX CARS Tour, driving the No. 47 for his own team, Ryley Music Racing.

In 2026, Music was announced as a finalist for the Kulwicki Driver Development Program.

Music has also competed in the Virginia Late Model Triple Crown Series, the All-Pro Limited Late Model Series, and the NASCAR Weekly Series, and is a frequent competitor at Langley Speedway.

== Motorsports results ==
=== CARS Late Model Stock Car Tour ===
(key) (Bold – Pole position awarded by qualifying time. Italics – Pole position earned by points standings or practice time. * – Most laps led. ** – All laps led.)

CARS Late Model Stock Car Tour results
| Year | Team | No. | Make | 1 | 2 | 3 | 4 | 5 | 6 | 7 | 8 | 9 | 10 | 11 | 12 | 13 | 14 | 15 | 16 | CLMSCTC | Pts | Ref |
|---|---|---|---|---|---|---|---|---|---|---|---|---|---|---|---|---|---|---|---|---|---|---|
| 2023 | Ryley Music Racing | 47 | N/A | SNM | FLC | HCY | ACE | NWS | LGY; 26 | DOM | CRW | HCY | ACE | TCM | WKS | AAS | SBO | TCM | CRW | 83rd | 7 | |
| 2025 | Ryley Music Racing | 47 | N/A | AAS; 16 | WCS | CDL | OCS | ACE | NWS | | | | | | | | | | | 47th | 47 | |
| 2025 | Ryley Music Racing | 47M | N/A | | | | | | | LGY; 21 | DOM | CRW | HCY | AND | FLC | SBO | TCM | NWS | | 47th | 47 | |
| 2026 | Ryley Music Racing | 47 | N/A | SNM | WCS | NSV | CRW | ACE | LGY; 28 | DOM | NWS | HCY | AND | FLC | TCM | NPS | SBO | | | 95th | 14 | |
