= Lance Gatlin =

American racing driver (born 1984)

- Born: November 28, 1984 (age 41) Hohenwald, Tennessee, U.S.

CARS Late Model Stock Tour career
- Debut season: 2026
- Years active: 2026–present
- Starts: 1
- Championships: 0
- Wins: 0
- Poles: 0
- Best finish: 76th in 2026
- Statistics up to date as of October 27, 2026.

Lance Gatlin (born November 28, 1984) is an American professional stock car racing driver. He currently competes in the zMAX CARS Tour, driving the No. 52 Chevrolet for his own team, Lance Gatlin Racing.

Gatlin has also competed in series such as the SEST Limited Late Models Series, where he won the championship in 2024, the UARA STARS Late Model Series, the IHRA Stock Car Series, and the NASCAR Local Racing Series, and is a frequent competitor at Newport Speedway, where he won the track championship in 2004.

== Motorsports results ==
=== CARS Late Model Stock Car Tour ===
(key) (Bold – Pole position awarded by qualifying time. Italics – Pole position earned by points standings or practice time. * – Most laps led. ** – All laps led.)

CARS Late Model Stock Car Tour results
Year	Team	No.	Make	1	2	3	4	5	6	7	8	9	10	11	12	13	14	CLMSCTC	Pts	Ref
2026	Lance Gatlin Racing	52	Chevy	SNM	WCS	NSV	CRW	ACE	LGY	DOM	NWS	HCY	AND	FLC	TCM	NPS; 19	SBO	76th	23	

=== IHRA Late Model Sportsman Series ===
(key) (Bold – Pole position awarded by qualifying time. Italics – Pole position earned by points standings or practice time. * – Most laps led. ** – All laps led.)

IHRA Late Model Sportsman Series
Year	Team	No.	Make	1	2	3	ISCSS	Pts	Ref
2026	Lance Gatlin Racing	52	Chevy	DUB; 19	CDL; 9	AND; 26	13th	87	
