= Brody Monahan =

American racing driver (born 2009)

- Born: February 14, 2009 (age 17) Waterford, Connecticut, U.S.

CARS Pro Late Model Tour career
- Debut season: 2025
- Current team: Monahan Motorsports
- Years active: 2025–present
- Car number: 31
- Starts: 16
- Championships: 0
- Wins: 2
- Poles: 1
- Best finish: 2nd in 2026
- Statistics up to date as of October 21, 2026.

Brody Monahan (born February 14, 2009) is an American professional stock car racing driver. He currently competes in the zMAX CARS Tour, driving the No. 31 Chevrolet for Monahan Motorsports, having previously driven for Bryson Lopez Racing, the No. 54 for Walker Motorsports, and the No. 7 for Taylor Stricklin Racing.

Monahan has also competed in series such as the ACT Late Model Tour, the INEX Winter Heat Series, the World Series of Asphalt Stock Car Racing, and the NASCAR Weekly Series.

== Motorsports results ==
=== CARS Late Model Stock Car Tour ===
(key) (Bold – Pole position awarded by qualifying time. Italics – Pole position earned by points standings or practice time. * – Most laps led. ** – All laps led.)

CARS Late Model Stock Car Tour results
| Year | Team | No. | Make | 1 | 2 | 3 | 4 | 5 | 6 | 7 | 8 | 9 | 10 | 11 | 12 | 13 | 14 | 15 | 16 | 17 | CLMSCTC | Pts | Ref |
|---|---|---|---|---|---|---|---|---|---|---|---|---|---|---|---|---|---|---|---|---|---|---|---|
| 2024 | Levitt Marlowe Racing | 17M | N/A | SNM | HCY | AAS | OCS | ACE | TCM | LGY | DOM | CRW | HCY | NWS | ACE | WCS | FLC | SBO | TCM; 22 | NWS | N/A | 0 | |
| 2025 | Matt Piercy Racing | 31 | Chevy | AAS | WCS | CDL | OCS | ACE | NWS | LGY | DOM | CRW | HCY; 17 | AND | FLC | SBO | TCM | NWS | | | 74th | 25 | |

=== CARS Pro Late Model Tour ===
(key)

CARS Pro Late Model Tour results
| Year | Team | No. | Make | 1 | 2 | 3 | 4 | 5 | 6 | 7 | 8 | 9 | 10 | 11 | 12 | 13 | CPLMTC | Pts | Ref |
|---|---|---|---|---|---|---|---|---|---|---|---|---|---|---|---|---|---|---|---|
| 2025 | Bryson Lopez Racing | 31 | Chevy | AAS; 10 | CDL; 21 | | | | | | | | | | | | 13th | 156 | |
| 2025 | Walker Motorsports | 54 | N/A | | | OCS; 8 | ACE; 3 | | | | | | | | | | 13th | 156 | |
| 2025 | Taylor Stricklin Racing | 7 | Chevy | | | | | NWS; 14 | CRW | HCY | HCY | AND | FLC | SBO | TCM | NWS | 13th | 156 | |
| 2026 | Brody Monahan Racing | 31 | Toyota | SNM; 15 | NSV; 6 | CRW; 4 | ACE; 21 | NWS; 8 | HCY; 6 | **AND**; 1** | FLC; 6 | TCM; 1 | NPS; 3 | SBO; 3 | | | 2nd | 401 | |
