= Ayden Millette =

American racing driver

- Born: Yorktown, Virginia, U.S.

CARS Late Model Stock Tour career
- Debut season: 2026
- Years active: 2026–present
- Starts: 1
- Championships: 0
- Wins: 0
- Poles: 0
- Best finish: 66th in 2026
- Statistics up to date as of October 27, 2026.

Ayden Millette (birth date unknown) is an American professional stock car racing driver. He currently competes in the zMAX CARS Tour, driving the No. 9 for RDS Performance.

In 2026, Millette was named as a semifinalist for the Kulwicki Driver Development Program.

Millette has also competed in the Virginia Late Model Triple Crown Series, and the NASCAR Local Racing Series, and is a former track champion at Langley Speedway.

== Motorsports results ==
=== CARS Late Model Stock Car Tour ===
(key) (Bold – Pole position awarded by qualifying time. Italics – Pole position earned by points standings or practice time. * – Most laps led. ** – All laps led.)

CARS Late Model Stock Car Tour results
Year	Team	No.	Make	1	2	3	4	5	6	7	8	9	10	11	12	13	14	CLMSCTC	Pts	Ref
2026	RDS Performance	9	N/A	SNM	WCS	NSV	CRW	ACE	LGY; 17	DOM	NWS	HCY	AND	FLC	TCM	NPS	SBO	66th	25	
