= Aiden King =

American racing driver (born 2010/11)

- Born: 2010 or 2011 (age 15–16) Floral City, Florida, U.S.

CARS Late Model Stock Tour career
- Debut season: 2025
- Years active: 2025–present
- Starts: 7
- Championships: 0
- Wins: 0
- Poles: 0
- Best finish: 29th in 2026
- Statistics up to date as of October 27, 2026.

Aiden King (birth date unknown) is an American professional stock car racing driver. He currently competes in the zMAX CARS Tour, driving the No. 7 for Matt Piercy Racing.

King has also competed in series such as the Paramount Kia Big 10 Challenge, where he won the championship in 2025, Carolina Pro Late Model Series, the INEX Nashville Spring Series, and the NASCAR Weekly Series.

== Motorsports results ==
=== CARS Late Model Stock Car Tour ===
(key) (Bold – Pole position awarded by qualifying time. Italics – Pole position earned by points standings or practice time. * – Most laps led. ** – All laps led.)

CARS Late Model Stock Car Tour results
Year	Team	No.	Make	1	2	3	4	5	6	7	8	9	10	11	12	13	14	15	CLMSCTC	Pts	Ref
2025	Lee Faulk Racing	5	N/A	AAS	WCS	CDL	OCS	ACE	NWS	LGY	DOM	CRW	HCY; DNQ	AND	FLC	SBO			65th	30	
2025	Matt Piercy Racing	7	Chevy														TCM; 17	NWS	65th	30	
2026	Matt Piercy Racing	7	Chevy	SNM; 23	WCS; 10	NSV; 23	CRW; 17	ACE; 20	LGY; 16	DOM	NWS	HCY	AND	FLC	TCM	NPS	SBO		29th	143	

=== CARS Pro Late Model Tour ===
(key)

CARS Pro Late Model Tour results
Year	Team	No.	Make	1	2	3	4	5	6	7	8	9	10	11	12	13	CPLMTC	Pts	Ref
2023	Walker Motorsports	15B	Chevy	SNM	HCY	ACE	NWS	TCM	DIL	CRW	WKS	HCY	TCM	SBO; 12	TCM; 8	CRW; 6	25th	72	
2024	Walker Motorsports	15	Chevy	SNM; 8	HCY; 8	OCS	ACE	TCM	CRW								24th	70	
2024	N/A	5	N/A							HCY; 13	NWS	ACE	FLC	SBO	TCM	NWS	24th	70	
