= Conner Weddell =

American racing driver

- Born: Centreville, Maryland, U.S.

CARS Late Model Stock Tour career
- Debut season: 2025
- Years active: 2025–present
- Starts: 2
- Championships: 0
- Wins: 0
- Poles: 0
- Best finish: 65th in 2026
- Statistics up to date as of October 27, 2026.

Conner "C-Weed" Weddell (birth date unknown) is an American professional stock car racing driver. He currently competes in the zMAX CARS Tour, driving the No. 22W Chevrolet for Nelson Motorsports, having previously driven for Weddell Motorsports.

Weddell first started racing in Legends Cars, where he won the Young Lions Division state championship in 2020 and 2022. He also won the Legend Car championship at Dominion Raceway in 2024.

Weddell has also competed in series such as the Virginia Late Model Triple Crown Series, the INEX Summer Shootout, and the NASCAR Local Racing Series.

== Motorsports results ==
=== CARS Late Model Stock Car Tour ===
(key) (Bold – Pole position awarded by qualifying time. Italics – Pole position earned by points standings or practice time. * – Most laps led. ** – All laps led.)

CARS Late Model Stock Car Tour results
Year	Team	No.	Make	1	2	3	4	5	6	7	8	9	10	11	12	13	14	15	CLMSCTC	Pts	Ref
2025	Weddell Motorsports	8	N/A	AAS	WCS	CDL	OCS	ACE	NWS	LGY	DOM; 20	CRW	HCY	AND	FLC	SBO	TCM	NWS	81st	22	
2026	Nelson Motorsports	22W	Chevy	SNM	WCS	NSV	CRW	ACE	LGY	DOM	NWS	HCY	AND	FLC	TCM	NPS	SBO; 15		65th	27	
