= Evan McKnight =

American racing driver

- Born: Norwalk, California, U.S.

CARS Pro Late Model Tour career
- Debut season: 2025
- Years active: 2025–present
- Starts: 14
- Championships: 0
- Wins: 0
- Poles: 1
- Best finish: 5th in 2026
- Statistics up to date as of October 21, 2026.

Evan McKnight (born January 24, 2009) is an American professional stock car racing driver. He currently competes in the zMAX CARS Tour, driving the No. 20 Chevrolet for Setzer Racing and Development.

McKnight first became interested in racing at the age of three after watching the Daytona 500 and attending the 2013 Auto Club 400 at Auto Club Speedway, and he later made his first competitive starts in legends cars, competing in the US INEX Legends Series. He then went on the compete in Pro Late Models.

McKnight has also competed in series such as the Carolina Pro Late Model Series, where he finished second in the points in 2024 and scored three wins, the PASS National Championship Super Late Model Series, the South Atlantic Pro Series, the INEX Nashville Spring Series, and the World Series of Asphalt Stock Car Racing.

== Motorsports results ==
=== CARS Pro Late Model Tour ===
(key)

CARS Pro Late Model Tour results
Year	Team	No.	Make	1	2	3	4	5	6	7	8	9	10	11	12	13	CPLMTC	Pts	Ref
2025	Setzer Racing & Development	61	Chevy	AAS	CDL	OCS; 4	ACE	NWS	CRW	HCY; 6	HCY	AND	FLC	SBO	TCM	NWS; 6	19th	110	
2026	Setzer Racing & Development	20	Chevy	SNM; 7	NSV; 8	CRW; 14	ACE; 10	NWS; 30	HCY; 5	AND; 6	FLC; 9	TCM; 5	NPS; 6	SBO; 9			5th	356	
