= Mason Walters (racing driver) =

American racing driver

- Born: Catawba County, North Carolina, U.S.

CARS Pro Late Model Tour career
- Debut season: 2025
- Years active: 2025–present
- Starts: 14
- Championships: 0
- Wins: 3
- Poles: 2
- Best finish: 1st in 2026

Awards
- 2026 CARS Pro Late Model Tour Rookie of the Year
- Statistics up to date as of October 17, 2026.

Mason Walters (birth date unknown) is an American professional stock car racing driver. He currently competes in the zMAX CARS Tour, driving the No. 6 Chevrolet for Setzer Racing and Development.

On February 28, 2026, Walters won his first career CARS Pro Late Model Tour race at Southern National Motorsports Park. He went on to win two more races at Newport Speedway and South Boston Speedway and win the PLM championship.

Walters has also competed in series such as the Carolina Pro Late Model Series, the South Atlantic Pro Series, the INEX Nashville Spring Series, and the NASCAR Weekly Series.

== Motorsports results ==
=== CARS Pro Late Model Tour ===
(key)

CARS Pro Late Model Tour results
Year	Team	No.	Make	1	2	3	4	5	6	7	8	9	10	11	12	13	CPLMTC	Pts	Ref
2025	Setzer Racing & Development	61	Chevy	AAS	CDL	OCS	ACE	NWS	CRW; 4	HCY	HCY	AND	FLC	SBO; 10	TCM; 7	NWS	20th	107	
2026	Setzer Racing & Development	6	Chevy	SNM; 1	NSV; 7	CRW; 5	ACE; 7	NWS; 5	HCY; 15	AND; 4	FLC; 7	TCM; 4	NPS; 1**	SBO; 1**			1st	427	
