= 2026 CARS Tour =

30th season of the CARS Tour

The 2026 CARS Tour was the 30th season of the zMAX CARS Tour, a stock car racing series. It began at Southern National Motorsports Park on February 28, and finished at South Boston Speedway on October 17. Caden Kvapil won the Late Model Stock Tour championship, while Mason Walters won the Pro Late Model Tour championship.

Landen Lewis entered the season as the defending Late Model Stock Tour champion, while Ben Maier entered as the defending Pro Late Model Tour championship. Both Lewis and Maier did not run a full season to defend their titles, as Lewis competed part-time in the NASCAR Craftsman Truck Series for Niece Motorsports in 2026, while Maier ran part-time in the same series.

== Schedule & results ==
Date	Track	Location	LMSC Winner	PLM Winner
February 28	Southern National Motorsports Park	Kenly, North Carolina	Caden Kvapil	Mason Walters
March 28	Wake County Speedway	Raleigh, North Carolina	Conner Jones	N/A
April 11	Nashville Fairgrounds Speedway	Nashville, Tennessee	Caden Kvapil	Dawson Sutton
April 26	Caraway Speedway	Asheboro, North Carolina	Landen Lewis	Kaden Honeycutt
May 9	Ace Speedway	Altamahaw, North Carolina	Kaden Honeycutt	Kaden Honeycutt
May 30	Langley Speedway	Hampton, Virginia	Connor Hall	N/A
June 13	Dominion Raceway	Thornburg, Virginia	Mini Tyrrell	N/A
July 17	North Wilkesboro Speedway	North Wilkesboro, North Carolina	Kaden Honeycutt	Kaden Honeycutt
August 8-9	Hickory Motor Speedway	Hickory, North Carolina	Matt Gould	T. J. DeCaire
August 22	Anderson Motor Speedway	Williamston, South Carolina	Carson Loftin	Brody Monahan
September 4	Florence Motor Speedway	Timmonsville, South Carolina	Caden Kvapil	Kaden Honeycutt
September 13	Tri-County Speedway	Hudson, North Carolina	Conner Jones	Brody Monahan
October 2	Newport Speedway	Newport, Tennessee	Caden Kvapil	Mason Walters
October 17	South Boston Speedway	South Boston, Virginia	Treyten Lapcevich	Mason Walters

- The race at Coastal Plains Speedway on February 21 was cancelled due to the effects of Winter Storm Gianna.

== Standings ==
=== Late Model Stock Car championship ===
(key) Bold – Pole position awarded by time. Italics – Pole position set by final practice results or rainout. * – Most laps led.

Pos	Driver	SNM	WCS	NSV	CRW	ACE	LGY	DOM	NWS	HCY	AND	FLC	TCM	NPS	SBO	Points
1	Caden Kvapil	1	8	1	3	3	3	6	12	8	5	1*	3	1	2*	553
2	Treyten Lapcevich	9	6	6	7	2	5	7	17	2	4	15	17	8	1	490
3	Conner Jones	17	1	4	2*	15	15	18	7	6	2	14	1*	13	4	483
4	Chad McCumbee	4	22	10	10	16	18	5	8	9	6	17	6	10	20	430
5	Chase Burrow	16	3	9	11	8	9	14	27	7	16	10	4	21	18	420
6	Carson Loftin	5	18	14	23	28	6	16	9	19	**1***	18	2	5	17	414
7	Carson Brown	10	13	7	8	26	4	**4***	10		11	2		3	9	400
8	Parker Eatmon	22	14	2*	14	13	7	2	20	15		25	16	6	8	386
9	Landon Huffman	14	7	17	16	11	12	20	16	12	20	24	20	14	14	373
10	London McKenzie	26	DNQ	8	9	**6**	22	8	13	16	13	26	24	11	16	356
11	Ronnie Bassett Jr.	25	19	26	25	9	29		22	5	7	**7**	12	**2***	11	353
12	Doug Barnes Jr.	3	15	18	27	12	**20**	9	Wth			8	18	22	26	294
13	Jace Hale	30	24	31	24	17	13	21	24	22	22	28	15	16	19	282
14	Landen Lewis		4	5	**1**	4	2	22	31	3						271
15	Landon S. Huffman	8		29	12	14	21		15	13		22			6	238
16	Jared Fryar	6	20	24	6		Wth	19			26		8		7	221
17	Kaden Honeycutt				4	1			**1***	**20**					5	195
18	Mini Tyrrell		**21***		13			1	21	10			5			189
19	Brandon Lopez	20	16	16	19	24			25	23					21	172
20	Sam Butler	12	2	13	18	18							21			169
21	Jake Bollman	28	17	21		Wth	10		3	26		23		Wth		168
22	Keelan Harvick										8	11	11	4	10	166
23	Brandon Pierce	DNQ	5	25	20	22	19	13	29							166
24	Matt Gould				28		27	10		1		21	9			161
25	Dylan Fetcho			**3**	5	7			30				7			161
26	Mason Bailey	11	DNQ	22	21	21	23	24							22	155
27	Mason Diaz	18	12	15	22	25		11								149
28	Connor Hall						1*	25	4						**3**	143
29	Aiden King	23	10	23	17	20	16									143
30	Chase Robertson									29	12	16	14	15	24	142
31	Lee Pulliam	**2***				10				21			13			126
32	Donovan Strauss	13	DNQ	19	26		8	23								126
33	Brenden Queen							3	5			5				115
34	Chase Burgeson						11				3		25		27	103
35	Thomas Beane			30							9		19	12		98
36	Corey Heim					5			2	25*						97
37	Riley Gentry	19	DNQ	27	DNQ						14		23			95
38	Kade Brown			28	DNQ				32	17	24	27	Wth			87
39	Ryan Millington	15	DNQ			27				4						86
40	Cody Kelley										15	3			23	85
41	Brandon Dean	DNQ			Wth	23				28	19	29				79
42	Clay Jones	7	9													69
43	Tate Fogleman	27	11	Wth					DNQ						25	68
44	Michael Bumgarner				15				33	11						67
45	Casey Kelley										10	9				65
46	Dale Earnhardt Jr.			12										9		63
47	Tyler Reif										21	4				60
48	Helio Meza							12		14						58
49	Derek Kraus						26							7		52
50	Ty Fredrickson								23						12	50
51	Brady Penny	29					Wth	15								40
52	Rodney Dowless													17	28	39
53	Taylor Satterfield										23			25		37
54	Carson Kvapil								6							36
55	Connor Zilisch											6				36
56	Austin Somero	24	DNQ		30											35
57	Hudson Sharp												10			32
58	Landon Pembelton			11												32
59	Max Reaves								11			Wth				31
60	Ryan Glenski											12				30
61	Shane van Gisbergen											13				29
62	Peyton Sellers														13	29
63	Matt Waltz						14									28
64	Chase Elliott								14							28
65	Conner Weddell														15	27
66	Ayden Millette						17									25
67	Brian Henderson							17								25
68	Ralph Carnes										17					25
69	Andrés Pérez de Lara								18							24
70	Dylan Newsome									18						24
71	Brandon Hanks										18					24
72	Darrick Coomer													18		24
73	Blake Stallings					19										23
74	Kyle Campbell								19							23
75	Owen Zacharias											19				23
76	Lance Gatlin													19		23
77	Matt Craig			20												22
78	Matt Cox											20				22
79	Tyler Worley													20		22
80	Jamey Caudill	21														21
81	Carson Haislip		23													21
82	Billy Snodgrass												22			20
83	Nik Williams													23		19
84	Ryan Matthews						24									18
85	Landon Rapp									24						18
86	Josh Goble													24		18
87	Carter Langley		25													17
88	Trey Crews						25									17
89	David Roberts										25					17
90	Daniel Vuncannon		26													16
91	Jesse Love								26							16
92	Brandon Rogers													26		16
93	Matt Leicht									27						15
94	Gary Greenwood										27					15
95	Ryley Music						28									14
96	Kasey Kleyn								28							14
97	Brian Blevins				29											13
98	Chris Horton Jr.						30									12
99	Kaeden Ballos	DNQ														5
100	Phoenyx Kimball		DNQ													5
101	Dylan Ward				DNQ											5
102	Atley Weise						DNQ									5
Pos	Driver	SNM	WCS	NSV	CRW	ACE	LGY	DOM	NWS	HCY	AND	FLC	TCM	NPS	SBO	Points

=== Pro Late Model Tour championship ===
(key) Bold – Pole position awarded by time. Italics – Pole position set by final practice results or rainout. * – Most laps led.

Pos	Driver	SNM	NSV	CRW	ACE	NWS	HCY	AND	FLC	TCM	NPS	SBO	Points
1	Mason Walters	1	7	5	7	5	15	4	7	4	**1****	**1****	427
2	Brody Monahan	15	6	4	21	8	6	**1****	6	1	3	3	401
3	Conner Jones	24	11	3	6	3	2	2	5	2	2	18	389
4	Treyten Lapcevich	5	12	**20**	3	18	3	12	**3***	6	4	4	380
5	Evan McKnight	7	**8**	14	10	30	5	6	9	5	6	9	356
6	Rodney Dowless	13	18	2	8	22	16	7	12	10	10	11	334
7	Kaden Honeycutt		2	1*	**1***	1	4		1	12	Wth	2	333
8	Case James	6	17	7	12	9	22	11	19	8	9	17	326
9	Dylan Garner	16	22	6	14	16	11	10	10	17	13	15	313
10	T. J. DeCaire					2	**1****	3	4	3*	5	5	281
11	Jack Baldwin			22		15	14	9	13	20	8	8	227
12	Colton Hale	11	27		22		19			21	12	12	170
13	Brandon Lopez		3	18		11				7	11		160
14	James Seeright	12	15	15	18	28	8						156
15	Jeff Batten	19		21	15		12		15	Wth		19	153
16	Carson Ware	8	20	8	11	12							152
17	Keelan Harvick	2*			5	7	7						150
18	Vito Cancilla						18		8	15		7	120
19	London McKenzie	3	23	16	Wth	20							112
20	Chase Burgeson	14	13	10	20								111
21	Luke Baldwin				9	**4***	10						107
22	Ben Maier		9	9	4								104
23	Taylor Hull	18	25	Wth	24			8					93
24	Ben Mack		30	17	17		13						91
25	Tony Cosentino	23	29	23	16								77
26	Palmer Haag				23		20			11			72
27	Tristan Pena			13	19		24						70
28	Jake Johnson				2					19			63
29	Jimmy Renfrew Jr.							5	16				63
30	Jayden Johnson	10										14	61
31	Joel Smith			12	13								59
32	Bayley Currey						9		18				57
33	Dusty Garus	20	DNQ		DNQ				17				57
34	Brody Gunter	17					17						50
35	Dawson Sutton		1*										47
36	Max Reaves	**4**				Wth					Wth		40
37	Dale Earnhardt Jr.								2				40
38	Mike Scorzelli					24						20	40
39	Brett Robinson		4										38
40	Dylan Cappello			19		27							38
41	Jackson Boone		5										37
42	Kasey Kleyn					6							37
43	Ryan Moore											6	37
44	Kevin Harvick										7		35
45	Cole Robie	9									Wth		33
46	Parker Eatmon									9			33
47	Cody Dempster		10										32
48	Albert Francis					10							32
49	Trevor Ward											10	32
50	Daniel Hemric			11									31
51	Donovan Strauss								11	Wth			31
52	Gio Ruggiero					13							29
53	Kole Raz									13			29
54	Landon Pembelton											13	29
55	Corey Deuser		14										28
56	Chase Elliott					14							28
57	Chad Kearney								14				28
58	Carter Whalen									14			28
59	Lee Tissot										14		28
60	Landon Huffman	21	36										27
61	Aidan Potter		16										26
62	Josh Horniman									16			26
63	Sylas Ripley											16	26
64	Seth Christensen					17							25
65	Austin Thompson									18			24
66	Mini Tyrrell					19							23
67	Hunter Wright		19										22
68	Conner Popplewell		21										21
69	Hudson Halder					21							21
70	Jacob Bradley						21						21
71	Ashton Higgins	22											20
72	T. J. Duke					23							19
73	Nick Loden						23						19
74	Trey Craig		24										18
75	Logan Jones	25											17
76	Brandon Marhefka					25							17
77	Anthony Bello		26										16
78	Corey Heim					26							16
79	Taylor Corum		28										14
80	Joe Maruca					29							13
81	Daniel Bolden		35										12
82	Davey Coble		31										11
83	Cole Williams		32										10
84	Zach Johnson		33										9
85	John Bradley		34										8
86	Colton Ingerick					DNQ							5
87	Blake Roberson		DNQ										5
88	Tyler Church				DNQ								5
89	Chris Hettinger								DNQ				5
90	E. J. Tamayo									DNQ			5
91	Graham Doyle									DNQ			5
92	Michael Bolden		DNQ										5
	Cody Martell	Wth											
	Mark Day		Wth										
	Chase Johnson		Wth										
Pos	Driver	SNM	NSV	CRW	ACE	NWS	HCY	AND	FLC	TCM	NPS	SBO	Points

== See also ==
- 2026 NASCAR Cup Series
- 2026 NASCAR O'Reilly Auto Parts Series
- 2026 NASCAR Craftsman Truck Series
- 2026 ARCA Menards Series
- 2026 ARCA Menards Series East
- 2026 ARCA Menards Series West
- 2026 NASCAR Whelen Modified Tour
- 2026 NASCAR Euro Series
- 2026 NASCAR Canada Series
- 2026 NASCAR Brasil Series
- 2026 SMART Modified Tour
- 2026 ASA STARS National Tour
