= Kaden Honeycutt =

American racing driver (born 2003)

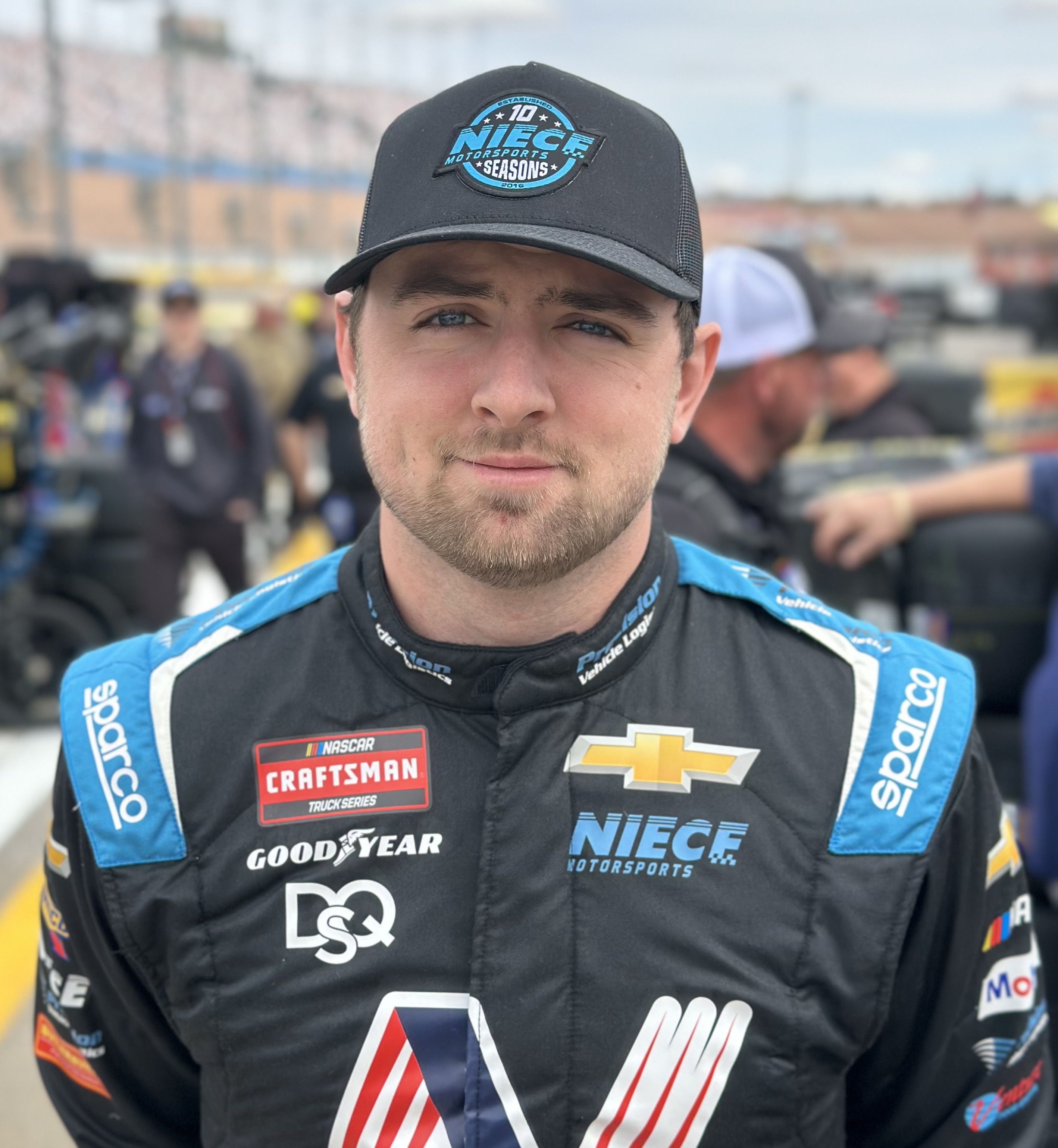
- Honeycutt at Las Vegas Motor Speedway in 2025
- Born: Kaden Wade Honeycutt; June 23, 2003 (age 23); Willow Park, Texas, U.S.
- Achievements: 2026 NASCAR Craftsman Truck Series Champion; 2024 CARS Pro Late Model Tour Champion; 2026 Thunder Road 200 Winner; 2024 Snowball Derby Winner; 2022 Hart to Heart 100 Winner
- Awards: 2021 CARS Late Model Stock Car Tour Rookie of the Year

NASCAR O'Reilly Auto Parts Series career
- 2 races run over 2 years
- 2024 position: 102nd
- Best finish: 102nd (2024)
- First race: 2023 Call 811.com Before You Dig 250 (Martinsville)
- Last race: 2024 BetRivers 200 (Dover)
Wins	Top tens	Poles
0	0	0

NASCAR FedEx Freight Truck Series career
- 84 races run over 5 years
- Truck no., team: No. 11 (Tricon Garage)
- 2026 position: 1st
- Best finish: 1st (2026)
- First race: 2022 Blue-Emu Maximum Pain Relief 200 (Martinsville)
- Last race: 2026 Craftsman 200 (Homestead)
- First win: 2026 Bully Hill Vineyards 176 at The Glen (Watkins Glen)
- Last win: 2026 Craftsman 200 (Homestead)
Wins	Top tens	Poles
5	43	3

ARCA Menards Series career
- 9 races run over 4 years
- Best finish: 29th (2019)
- First race: 2018 Kentuckiana Ford Dealers ARCA Fall Classic (Salem)
- Last race: 2026 Bush's Best 200 (Bristol)
- First win: 2026 LiUNA! 150 (IRP)
Wins	Top tens	Poles
2	5	0

ARCA Menards Series East career
- 3 races run over 2 years
- Best finish: 26th (2026)
- First race: 2023 Bush's Beans 200 (Bristol)
- Last race: 2026 Bush's Best 200 (Bristol)
Wins	Top tens	Poles
1	2	0

ARCA Menards Series West career
- 5 races run over 2 years
- Best finish: 14th (2023)
- First race: 2023 NAPA Auto Care 150 (Roseville)
- Last race: 2024 Desert Diamond Casino West Valley 100 (Phoenix)
- First win: 2023 NAPA Auto Care 150 (Roseville)
- Last win: 2023 51FIFTY Jr. ARCA Homecoming 150 (Madera)
Wins	Top tens	Poles
2	5	0
- Statistics up to date as of November 6, 2026.

Kaden Wade Honeycutt (born June 23, 2003) is an American professional stock car racing driver. He competes full-time in the NASCAR Truck Series, driving the No. 11 Toyota Tundra TRD Pro for Tricon Garage. He has previously competed in the NASCAR Xfinity Series, the ARCA Menards Series, and the CARS Tour.

Honeycutt is the 2026 NASCAR Craftsman Truck Series champion.

== Racing career ==
=== CARS Tour ===
Honeycutt began competing in the CARS Tour in 2021, where he ran all thirteen late model stock tour races. He finished second in the points standings with two wins, seven top-fives, and 12 top-tens, earning CARS Late Model Stock Tour Rookie of the Year honors.

=== eNASCAR Coca-Cola iRacing Series ===
Honeycutt, along with Parker Retzlaff, were announced as the drivers for RFK Racing's team in the eNASCAR Coca-Cola iRacing Series in 2022.

=== ARCA Menards Series ===
Honeycutt drove part-time in the ARCA Menards Series for Empire Racing in 2018 and his own team in 2019.

On September 12, 2023, it was announced that Honeycutt would enter the Bush's Beans 200, driving the No. 17 for McGowan Motorsports. After being involved in an accident, Honeycutt would finish in the 21st position.

On May 5, 2026, it was announced that Honeycutt would enter the General Tire 100 at The Glen, driving the No. 17 for Cook Racing Technologies. After qualifying was rained out, he started 15th, led the practice session, and would end up winning the race. He later won at IRP later in the year. He also ran the ARCA / ARCA East combination race at Bristol, where he finished third.

=== ARCA Menards Series East ===
On September 12, 2023, it was announced that Honeycutt would enter the Bush's Beans 200, driving the No. 17 for McGowan Motorsports. After being involved in an accident, Honeycutt would finish in the 21st position.

Honeycutt returned to the East Series in 2026 for Cook Racing Technologies at the ARCA / ARCA East combination race at IRP, where he won. He also ran the ARCA / ARCA East combination race at Bristol, where he finished third.

=== ARCA Menards Series West ===
Honeycutt made his ARCA Menards Series West debut at the All American Speedway in 2023 with McGowan Motorsports, winning the race after leading the most laps. He scored his second win of the season at Madera Speedway, leading every lap of the race to a dominating victory.

=== NASCAR Craftsman Truck Series ===
Honeycutt planned on making his NASCAR Camping World Truck Series debut in October 2019, driving for his own team, which he fielded in ARCA that year. However, that did not end up happening.

Honeycutt would not make his debut in the Truck Series until 2022 when he drove the No. 46 for G2G Racing in the race at Martinsville. On June 16, 2022, G2G announced that Honeycutt would return to drive for the team in the races at Nashville (in the No. 47), Richmond and Kansas in September. It was later announced on July 14, 2022 that Honeycutt had signed a three-race deal with On Point Motorsports to drive the No. 30 truck for the team in the races at Pocono, Richmond, and Kansas races. Honeycutt's breakthrough moment would be at Bristol, in which he finished in the top-fifteen.

On January 31, 2023, Roper Racing announced that Honeycutt would drive their No. 04 truck in the first six races of the Truck Series season. On July 11, 2023, it was announced that Honeycutt would attempt to qualify for the Truck Series race at Pocono in a part-time fourth truck for Niece Motorsports, the No. 44.

On February 9, 2024, Niece Motorsports announced that Honeycutt would drive the No. 45 truck for twelve races. He would be sharing the ride with Johnny Sauter, Connor Mosack, and Ross Chastain. His 12 race schedule started at Atlanta with a sixth place finish.

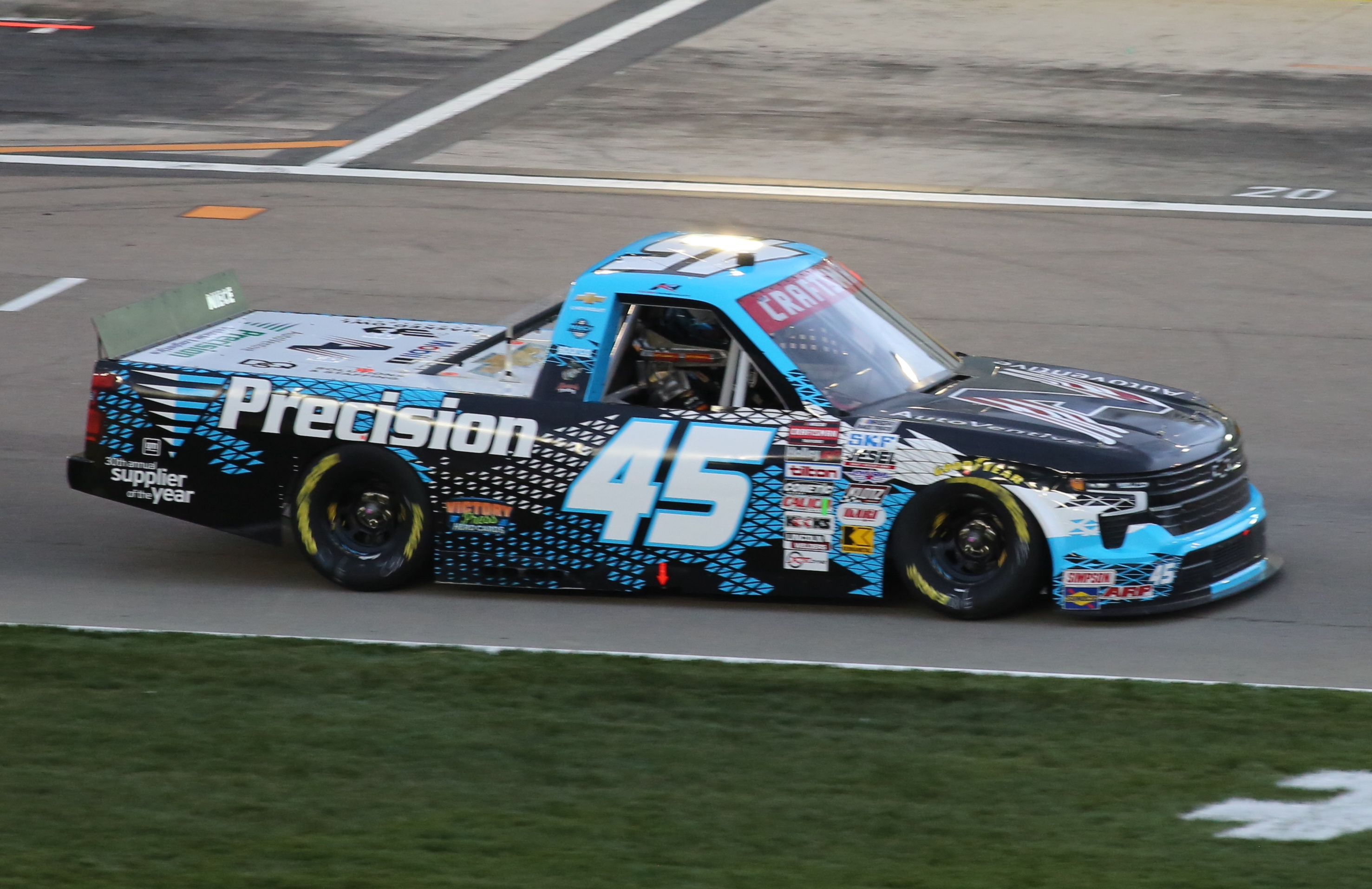
Honeycutt's No. 45 truck at Las Vegas Motor Speedway in 2025

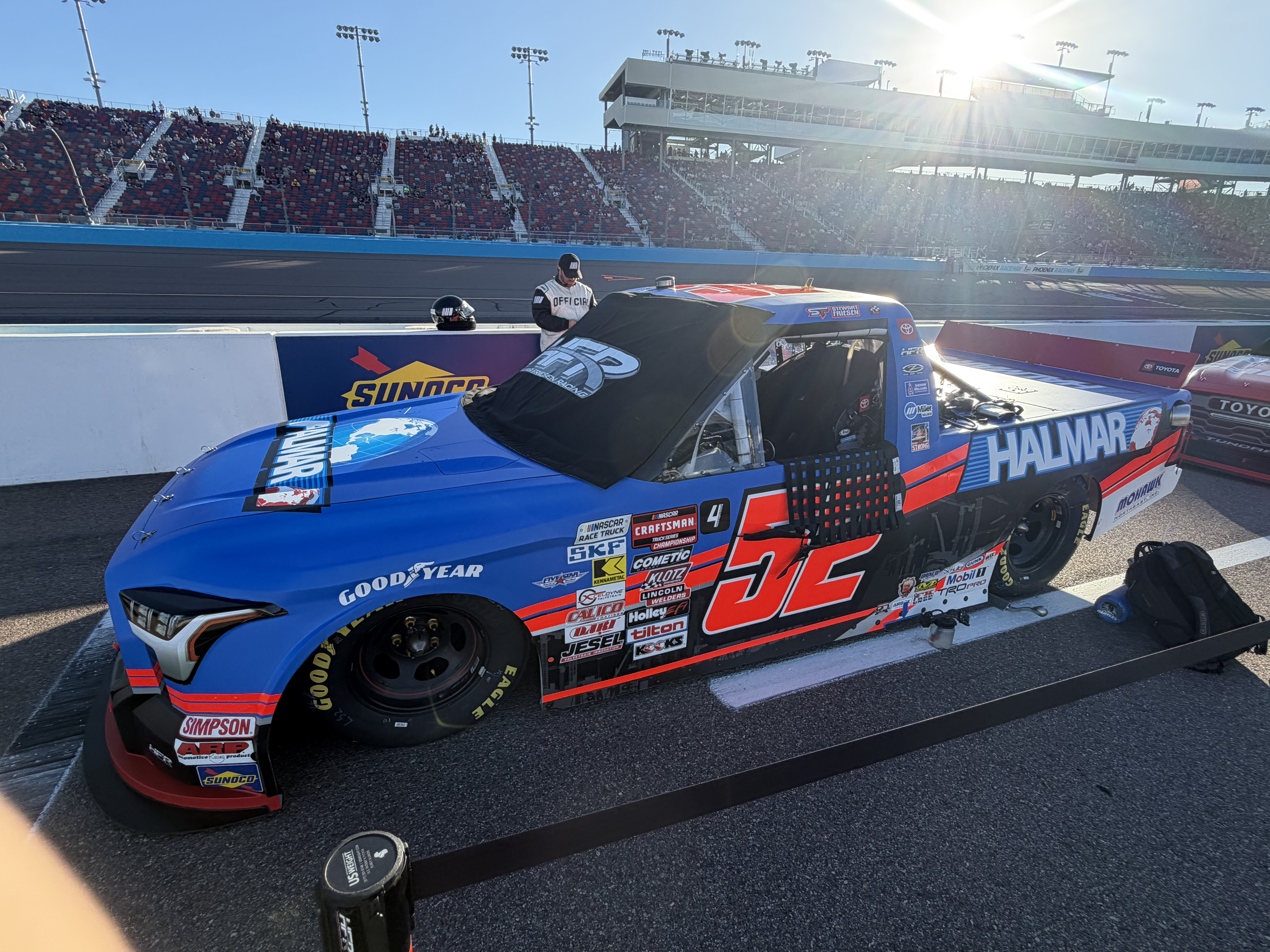
Honeycutt's No. 52 truck at Phoenix Raceway in 2025

On October 1, 2024, it was announced that Honeycutt would drive full-time for Niece Motorsports No. 45 starting in 2025. However on August 4, 2025, Niece announced that they had released Honeycutt effective immediately after he signed an agreement with a different manufacturer for the 2026 season. Honeycutt, who was 73 points above the playoff cutoff line at the time of the release, drove in the No. 02 Chevrolet for Young's Motorsports at Watkins Glen to maintain playoff eligibility. After that, he substituted for an injured Stewart Friesen at Halmar Friesen Racing, driving the No. 52 Toyota for the rest of the season starting at Richmond. Despite not winning a race, Honeycutt qualified for the Playoffs and was able to advance to the Championship 4. Honeycutt would eventually finish third in the point standings.

On December 5, 2025, it was announced that Honeycutt would drive full-time for Tricon Garage in the No. 11 Toyota for the 2026 season. He scored his first career Truck Series victories at Watkins Glen and Richmond. In "The Chase", Honeycutt won at Kansas and Phoenix. He then won the season ending race at Homestead to win his first Truck Series championship.

=== NASCAR Xfinity Series ===
On April 11, 2023, it was announced that Honeycutt would attempt to make his NASCAR Xfinity Series debut at Martinsville Speedway for CHK Racing. Honeycutt made the race after qualifying 33rd. He finished 38th after suffering an engine failure on lap 83.

In 2024, Honeycutt drove the No. 92 Chevrolet for DGM Racing at Dover Motor Speedway.

== Motorsports career results ==
=== Racing career summary ===
Season	Series	Team	Races	Wins	Top 5	Top 10	Points	Position
2018	ARCA Racing Series	Empire Racing	2	0	0	0	300	66th
2019	ARCA Menards Series	Kaden Honeycutt Racing	3	0	0	2	560	29th
2021	CARS Late Model Stock Car Tour	Justin Johnson	13	2	7	12	364	**2nd**
2022	CARS Late Model Stock Car Tour	Nelson Motorsports	13	1	5	11	338	4th
2022	NASCAR Camping World Truck Series	G2G Racing	2	0	0	0	150	32nd
2022	NASCAR Camping World Truck Series	On Point Motorsports	7	0	0	1	150	32nd
2023	CARS Pro Late Model Tour	Mavrick Page Motorsports	1	1	1	1	34	39th
2023	CARS Late Model Stock Car Tour	Kaden Honeycutt Racing	11	1	6	9	287	11th
2023	CARS Late Model Stock Car Tour	Mike Darne Racing	1	0	0	0	287	11th
2023	ARCA Menards Series West	McGowan Motorsports	4	2	2	4	216	14th
2023	ARCA Menards Series East	McGowan Motorsports	1	0	0	0	23	53rd
2023	ARCA Menards Series	McGowan Motorsports	1	0	0	0	23	108th
2023	NASCAR Craftsman Truck Series	Roper Racing	5	0	0	1	190	27th
2023	NASCAR Craftsman Truck Series	Young's Motorsports	5	0	0	2	190	27th
2023	NASCAR Craftsman Truck Series	Niece Motorsports	1	0	0	0	190	27th
2023	NASCAR Xfinity Series	CHK Racing	1	0	0	0	0	NC†
2024	CARS Pro Late Model Tour	Mavrick Page Motorsports	8	1	4	8	386	**1st**
2024	CARS Pro Late Model Tour	Bryson Lopez Racing	5	2	5	5	386	**1st**
2024	CARS Late Model Stock Car Tour	Tom Usry Racing	5	0	2	3	121	25th
2024	CARS Late Model Stock Car Tour	R&S Race Cars	1	0	0	0	121	25th
2024	ARCA Menards Series West	Sigma Performance Services	1	0	0	1	38	45th
2024	NASCAR Craftsman Truck Series	Niece Motorsports	14	0	2	6	384	19th
2024	NASCAR Xfinity Series	DGM Racing	1	0	0	0	0	NC†
2025	ASA STARS National Tour	Larry Blount	1	0	0	1	50	49th
2025	CARS Pro Late Model Tour	Bryson Lopez Racing	4	1	1	3	146	15th
2025	CARS Late Model Stock Car Tour	Tom Usry Racing	4	1	2	2	220	19th
2025	CARS Late Model Stock Car Tour	Hettinger Racing	3	0	2	2	220	19th
2025	NASCAR Craftsman Truck Series	Niece Motorsports	16	0	2	9	4034	**3rd**
2025	NASCAR Craftsman Truck Series	Young's Motorsports	1	0	0	0	4034	**3rd**
2025	NASCAR Craftsman Truck Series	Halmar Friesen Racing	8	0	2	5	4034	**3rd**
2026	ASA STARS National Tour	JC Motorsports	1	0	0	0	40*	53rd*
2026	CARS Pro Late Model Tour	JC Motorsports	8	4	7	7	333	7th
2026	CARS Late Model Stock Car Tour	Tom Usry Racing	5	2	4	4	195	17th
2026	ARCA Menards Series East	Cook Racing Technologies	2	1	2	2	88	26th
2026	ARCA Menards Series	Cook Racing Technologies	3	2	3	3	136	35th
2026	NASCAR Craftsman Truck Series	Tricon Garage	25	5	15	18	2471	**1st**

^{†} As Honeycutt was a guest driver, he was ineligible for championship points.

=== NASCAR ===
(key) (Bold – Pole position awarded by qualifying time. Italics – Pole position earned by points standings or practice time. * – Most laps led.)

==== Xfinity Series ====
NASCAR Xfinity Series results
Year	Team	No.	Make	1	2	3	4	5	6	7	8	9	10	11	12	13	14	15	16	17	18	19	20	21	22	23	24	25	26	27	28	29	30	31	32	33	NXSC	Pts	Ref
2023	CHK Racing	74	Chevy	DAY	CAL	LVS	PHO	ATL	COA	RCH	MAR; 38	TAL	DOV	DAR	CLT	PIR	SON	NSH	CSC	ATL	NHA	POC	ROA	MCH	IRC	GLN	DAY	DAR	KAN	BRI	TEX	ROV	LVS	HOM	MAR	PHO	105th	0^{1}	
2024	DGM Racing	92	Chevy	DAY	ATL	LVS	PHO	COA	RCH	MAR	TEX	TAL	DOV; 23	DAR	CLT	PIR	SON	IOW	NHA	NSH	CSC	POC	IND	MCH	DAY	DAR	ATL	GLN	BRI	KAN	TAL	ROV	LVS	HOM	MAR	PHO	102nd	0^{1}	

==== Truck Series ====
NASCAR Truck Series results
Year	Team	No.	Make	1	2	3	4	5	6	7	8	9	10	11	12	13	14	15	16	17	18	19	20	21	22	23	24	25	NTSC	Pts	Ref
2022	G2G Racing	46	Toyota	DAY	LVS	ATL	COA	MAR; 34	BRD	DAR	KAN	TEX	CLT	GTW	SON	KNX													32nd	150	
2022	G2G Racing	47	Toyota														NSH; 21	MOH											32nd	150	
2022	On Point Motorsports	30	Toyota																POC; 25	IRP	RCH; 21	KAN; 24	BRI; 13	TAL; 11	HOM; 27	PHO; 9			32nd	150	
2023	Roper Racing	04	Ford	DAY; DNQ	LVS; 25	ATL; 33	COA; 15	TEX; Wth	BRD; 9	MAR; 28	KAN																		27th	190	
2023	Young's Motorsports	20	Chevy									DAR; 10	NWS; 17	CLT	GTW	NSH	MOH												27th	190	
2023	Niece Motorsports	44	Chevy															POC; 20	RCH	IRP	MLW								27th	190	
2023	Young's Motorsports	02	Chevy																			KAN; 27	BRI; 25	TAL	HOM	PHO; 8			27th	190	
2024	Niece Motorsports	45	Chevy	DAY	ATL; 6	LVS	BRI; 12	COA	MAR; 9	TEX	KAN; 4	DAR	NWS	CLT; 7	GTW	NSH; 33	POC	IRP	RCH; 14	MLW; 12	BRI; 35	KAN; 4	TAL; 19	HOM; 14	MAR; 33	PHO; 7			19th	384	
2025	Niece Motorsports	45	Chevy	DAY; 35	ATL; 6	LVS; 12	HOM; 10	MAR; 26	BRI; 8	CAR; 6	TEX; 32	KAN; 8	NWS; 8	CLT; 3	NSH; 6	MCH; 21	POC; 3	LRP; 12	IRP; 14										3rd	4034	
2025	Young's Motorsports	02	Chevy																	GLN; 34									3rd	4034	
2025	Halmar Friesen Racing	52	Toyota																		RCH; 10	DAR; 18	BRI; 12	NHA; 7	ROV; 14	TAL; 10	MAR; 2	PHO; 3	3rd	4034	
2026	Tricon Garage	11	Toyota	DAY; 8	ATL; 21	STP; 5	**DAR**; 4*	CAR; 2	**BRI**; 31	TEX; 3	GLN; 1	DOV; 4	CLT; 2	NSH; 27	MCH; 2	**COR**; 23	LRP; 3	NWS; 11	IRP; 7	RCH; 1*	NHA; 3	BRI; 8	KAN; 1*	CLT; 3	PHO; 1*	TAL; 5	MAR; 14	HOM; 1	1st	2471	
2027	Tricon Garage	11	Toyota	DAY	ATL	STP	DAR	BRI	TEX	KAN	NWS	CLT	NSS	POC	MCH	LRP	ATL	IRP	BRI	BGS	MSP	NHA	KAN	CLT	PHO	TAL	MAR	HOM			

^{*} Season still in progress
^{1} Ineligible for series points

=== ARCA Menards Series ===
(key) (Bold – Pole position awarded by qualifying time. Italics – Pole position earned by points standings or practice time. * – Most laps led. ** – All laps led.)

ARCA Menards Series results
Year	Team	No.	Make	1	2	3	4	5	6	7	8	9	10	11	12	13	14	15	16	17	18	19	20	AMSC	Pts	Ref
2018	Empire Racing	43	Ford	DAY	NSH	SLM	TAL	TOL	CLT	POC	MCH	MAD	GTW	CHI	IOW	ELK	POC	ISF	BLN	DSF	SLM; 19	IRP; 18	KAN	66th	300	
2019	Kaden Honeycutt Racing	38	Ford	DAY	FIF; 9	SLM	TAL	NSH; 7	TOL	CLT	POC	MCH	MAD	GTW	CHI	ELK	IOW; 11	POC	ISF	DSF	SLM	IRP	KAN	29th	560	
2023	McGowan Motorsports	17	Chevy	DAY	PHO	TAL	KAN	CLT	BLN	ELK	MOH	IOW	POC	MCH	IRP	GLN	ISF	MLW	DSF	KAN	BRI; 21	SLM	TOL	108th	23	
2026	Cook Racing Technologies	17	Toyota	DAY	PHO	KAN	TAL	GLN; 1*	TOL	MCH	POC	BER	ELK	CHI	LRP	IRP; 1	IOW	ISF	MAD	DSF	SLM	BRI; 3	KAN	35th	136	

==== ARCA Menards Series East ====
ARCA Menards Series East results
Year	Team	No.	Make	1	2	3	4	5	6	7	8	AMSWC	Pts	Ref
2023	McGowan Motorsports	17	Chevy	FIF	DOV	NSV	FRS	IOW	IRP	MLW	BRI; 21	53rd	23	
2026	Cook Racing Technologies	17	Toyota	HCY	CAR	NSV	TOL	IRP; 1	FRS	IOW	BRI; 3	26th	88	

==== ARCA Menards Series West ====
ARCA Menards Series West results
Year	Team	No.	Make	1	2	3	4	5	6	7	8	9	10	11	12	AMSWC	Pts	Ref
2023	McGowan Motorsports	17	Chevy	PHO	IRW	KCR	PIR	SON	IRW	SHA	EVG	AAS; 1*	LVS; 9	MAD; 1**	PHO; 9	14th	216	
2024	Sigma Performance Services	23	Chevy	PHO	KER	PIR	SON	IRW	IRW	SHA	TRI	MAD	AAS	KER	PHO; 6	45th	38	

=== CARS Late Model Stock Car Tour ===
(key) (Bold – Pole position awarded by qualifying time. Italics – Pole position earned by points standings or practice time. * – Most laps led. ** – All laps led.)

CARS Late Model Stock Car Tour results
Year	Team	No.	Make	1	2	3	4	5	6	7	8	9	10	11	12	13	14	15	16	17	CLMSCTC	Pts	Ref
2021	Justin Johnson	4H	Ford	DIL; 12	HCY; 9	OCS; 10	ACE; 7	CRW; 3	LGY; 1**	DOM; 3		MMS; 4	TCM; 4	FLC; 1	WKS; 5	SBO; 7					2nd	364	
2021	Justin Johnson	92	Ford								HCY; 7										2nd	364	
2022	Nelson Motorsports	12	Chevy	CRW; 2*	HCY; 7	GPS; 21	AAS; 9	FCS; 8	LGY; 4	DOM; 6		ACE; 3	MMS; 6	NWS; 6	TCM	ACE; 1*	SBO	CRW; 20			4th	338	
2022	Nelson Motorsports	45	Chevy								HCY; 3										4th	338	
2023	Kaden Honeycutt Racing	10	Ford	SNM; 3	FLC				LGY; 1					TCM; 18	WKS						11th	287	
2023	Kaden Honeycutt Racing	10	Chevy			HCY; 3	ACE; 8	NWS; 5		DOM; 26	CRW; 4		ACE; 4			AAS; 6	SBO	TCM			11th	287	
2023	Mike Darne Racing	45	Chevy									HCY; 26									11th	287	
2023	Kaden Honeycutt Racing	10H	Toyota																CRW; 6		11th	287	
2024	Tom Usry Racing	17	Ford	SNM; 5	HCY	AAS	OCS; 2	ACE	TCM; 14	LGY	DOM	CRW	HCY	NWS; 18	ACE	WCS	FLC	SBO		NWS; 8	25th	121	
2024	R&S Race Cars	15C	N/A																TCM; 23		25th	121	
2025	Tom Usry Racing	17	Ford	AAS; 22	WCS	CDL						CRW; 2				SBO; 1	TCM	NWS			19th	230	
2025	Hettinger Racing	71	Chevy				OCS; 3	ACE													19th	230	
2025	Hettinger Racing	5	Chevy						NWS; 4	LGY	DOM; 14										19th	230	
2025	Tom Usry Racing	17H	N/A										HCY; 23	AND	FLC						19th	230	
2026	Tom Usry Racing	17	Toyota	SNM	WCS	NSV	CRW; 4	ACE; 1	LGY	DOM	**NWS**; 1*	**HCY**; 20	AND	FLC	TCM	NPS	SBO; 5				17th	195	

=== CARS Pro Late Model Tour ===
(key)

CARS Pro Late Model Tour results
Year	Team	No.	Make	1	2	3	4	5	6	7	8	9	10	11	12	13	CPLMTC	Pts	Ref
2023	Mavrick Page Motorsports	51	Chevy	SNM	HCY	ACE	NWS	TCM	DIL	CRW	WKS	HCY	TCM	SBO	TCM	CRW; 1	39th	34	
2024	Mavrick Page Motorsports	51	Chevy	SNM; 3	HCY; 9	OCS; 1*	ACE; 3	TCM; 5	CRW; 7	HCY; 8	NWS; 8						1st	386	
2024	Bryson Lopez Racing	47	Chevy									**ACE**; 2	FLC; 3	SBO; 4	TCM; 1	NWS; 1*	1st	386	
2025	Bryson Lopez Racing	31	Chevy	AAS	CDL	OCS; 13	ACE										15th	146	
2025	Bryson Lopez Racing	47	Chevy					NWS; 1**	CRW	HCY; 10	HCY; 7	AND	FLC	SBO	TCM	NWS	15th	146	
2026	JC Motorsports	54	Toyota	SNM	NSV; 2	CRW; 1*	**ACE**; 1*	NWS; 1	HCY; 4	AND	FLC; 1	TCM; 12	NPS; Wth	SBO; 2			7th	333	

=== ASA STARS National Tour ===
(key) (Bold – Pole position awarded by qualifying time. Italics – Pole position earned by points standings or practice time. * – Most laps led. ** – All laps led.)

ASA STARS National Tour results
Year	Team	No.	Make	1	2	3	4	5	6	7	8	9	10	11	12	ASNTC	Pts	Ref
2025	Larry Blount	21	N/A	NSM	FIF; 8	DOM	HCY	NPS	MAD	SLG	AND	OWO	TOL	WIN	NSV	49th	50	
2026	JC Motorsports	54	Toyota	NSM; 16	FIF	HCY	SLG	MAD	NPS	OWO	TRI	WIN	NSV	NSM		-*	-*	
