= David Roberts (racing driver) =

American racing driver

- Born: Simpsonville, South Carolina, U.S.

CARS Late Model Stock Tour career
- Debut season: 2025
- Years active: 2025–present
- Starts: 2
- Championships: 0
- Wins: 0
- Poles: 0
- Best finish: 89th in 2026
- Statistics up to date as of October 27, 2026.

David Roberts (birth date unknown) is an American professional stock car racing driver. He currently competes in the zMAX CARS Tour, driving the No. 18 Chevrolet for his own team, David Roberts Racing.

Roberts has also competed in series such as the Virginia Late Model Triple Crown Series, the UARA STARS Late Model Series, the I-95 Showdown Series, and the NASCAR Local Racing Series, and is a frequent competitor at Anderson Speedway, where he has won multiple track championships.

== Motorsports results ==
=== CARS Late Model Stock Car Tour ===
(key) (Bold – Pole position awarded by qualifying time. Italics – Pole position earned by points standings or practice time. * – Most laps led. ** – All laps led.)

CARS Late Model Stock Car Tour results
Year	Team	No.	Make	1	2	3	4	5	6	7	8	9	10	11	12	13	14	15	CLMSCTC	Pts	Ref
2025	David Roberts Racing	18	Chevy	AAS	WCS	CDL	OCS	ACE	NWS	LGY	DOM	CRW	HCY	AND; 27	FLC	SBO	TCM	NWS	96th	15	
2026	David Roberts Racing	18	Chevy	SNM	WCS	NSV	CRW	ACE	LGY	DOM	NWS	HCY	AND; 26	FLC	TCM	NPS	SBO		89th	17	
