= Ryan Matthews (racing driver) =

American racing driver

- Born: Mechanicsville, Virginia, U.S.

CARS Late Model Stock Tour career
- Debut season: 2023
- Years active: 2023, 2026–present
- Starts: 2
- Championships: 0
- Wins: 0
- Poles: 0
- Best finish: 52nd in 2023
- Statistics up to date as of October 12, 2026.

Ryan Matthews (birth date unknown) is an American professional stock car racing driver. He currently competes in the zMAX CARS Tour, driving the No. 41 Chevrolet for Hedgecock Racing.

Matthews has also competed in the Virginia Late Model Triple Crown Series, and the NASCAR Local Racing Series, and is a frequent competitor at Langley Speedway.

== Motorsports results ==
=== CARS Late Model Stock Car Tour ===
(key) (Bold – Pole position awarded by qualifying time. Italics – Pole position earned by points standings or practice time. * – Most laps led. ** – All laps led.)

CARS Late Model Stock Car Tour results
Year	Team	No.	Make	1	2	3	4	5	6	7	8	9	10	11	12	13	14	15	16	CLMSCTC	Pts	Ref
2023	N/A	51M	Toyota	SNM	FLC	HCY	ACE	NWS	LGY; 10	DOM	CRW	HCY	ACE	TCM	WKS	AAS	SBO	TCM	CRW	52nd	23	
2026	Hedgecock Racing	41	Chevy	SNM	WCS	NSV	CRW	ACE	LGY; 24	DOM	NWS	HCY	AND	FLC	TCM	NPS	SBO			84th	18	
