= Chase Robertson =

American racing driver

- Born: Winston-Salem, North Carolina, U.S.

CARS Late Model Stock Tour career
- Debut season: 2026
- Years active: 2026–present
- Starts: 6
- Championships: 0
- Wins: 0
- Poles: 0
- Best finish: 30th in 2026
- Statistics up to date as of October 27, 2026.

Chase Robertson (birth date unknown) is an American professional stock car racing driver. He currently competes in the zMAX CARS Tour, driving the No. 37 Chevrolet for Project 37, and the SMART Modified Tour, driving the No. 11 for Todd Fuquay.

Robertson started his racing career at the age of eight, where he raced in Bandoleros, before moving to Late Models and Limited Sportsman cars.

Robertson's father and grandfather are former racing drivers, having raced at Bowman Gray Stadium. His brother, Ryan, also competes in racing.

Robertson has also competed in the 602 Super Limited Series, where he finished second in the points with three wins, the Paramount Kia Big 10 Challenge, and the NASCAR Local Racing Series, and is a regular competitor at Bowman Gray Stadium, where he won the NASCAR Weekly Series Division II national title in 2025.

== Motorsports results ==
=== CARS Late Model Stock Car Tour ===
(key) (Bold – Pole position awarded by qualifying time. Italics – Pole position earned by points standings or practice time. * – Most laps led. ** – All laps led.)

CARS Late Model Stock Car Tour results
Year	Team	No.	Make	1	2	3	4	5	6	7	8	9	10	11	12	13	14	CLMSCTC	Pts	Ref
2026	Project 37	37	Chevy	SNM	WCS	NSV	CRW	ACE	LGY	DOM	NWS	HCY; 29	AND; 12	FLC; 16	TCM; 14	NPS; 15	SBO; 24	30th	142	

=== SMART Modified Tour ===
SMART Modified Tour results
Year	Car owner	No.	Make	1	2	3	4	5	6	7	8	9	10	11	12	13	SMTC	Pts	Ref
2026	Todd Fuquay	11	N/A	FLO	AND	SBO	DOM	HCY; 12	WKS	FCR	CRW; 17	PUL	CAR	ROU; 24	TRI	NWS	32nd	70	
