= Rodney Dowless =

American racing driver

- Born: Dix Hills, New York, U.S.

CARS Pro Late Model Tour career
- Debut season: 2025
- Years active: 2025–present
- Starts: 24
- Championships: 0
- Wins: 0
- Poles: 0
- Best finish: 6th in 2025, 2026
- Statistics up to date as of October 21, 2026.

Rodney Dowless Jr. is an American professional stock car racing driver. He currently competes in the zMAX CARS Tour, driving the No. 25 Chevrolet for Rackley W.A.R., having previously driven for Walker Motorsports and Ty King Motorsports.

Dowless has also competed in the INEX Nashville Spring Series, the INEX Summer Shootout, the INEX Winter Heat, and the NELCAR Legends Tour.

== Motorsports results ==
=== CARS Late Model Stock Car Tour ===
(key) (Bold – Pole position awarded by qualifying time. Italics – Pole position earned by points standings or practice time. * – Most laps led. ** – All laps led.)

CARS Late Model Stock Car Tour results
Year	Team	No.	Make	1	2	3	4	5	6	7	8	9	10	11	12	13	14	CLMSCTC	Pts	Ref
2026	Carroll Speedshop	57	Chevy	SNM	WCS	NSV	CRW	ACE	LGY	DOM	NWS	HCY	AND	FLC	TCM	NPS; 17	SBO; 28	52nd	39	

=== CARS Pro Late Model Tour ===
(key)

CARS Pro Late Model Tour results
Year	Team	No.	Make	1	2	3	4	5	6	7	8	9	10	11	12	13	CPLMTC	Pts	Ref
2025	Walker Motorsports	15	Toyota	AAS; 7	CDL; 22			NWS; 18	CRW; 9	HCY; 8		AND; 11					6th	374	
2025	Walker Motorsports	15D	Toyota			OCS; 9	ACE; 4										6th	374	
2025	Walker Motorsports	18	Toyota								HCY; 26						6th	374	
2025	Ty King Motorsports	62	N/A										FLC; 11		TCM; 15		6th	374	
2025	Ty King Motorsports	62D	N/A											SBO; 16			6th	374	
2025	N/A	74	N/A													NWS; 17	6th	374	
2026	Rackley W.A.R.	25	Chevy	SNM; 13	NSV; 18	CRW; 2	ACE; 8	NWS; 22	HCY; 16	AND; 7	FLC; 12	TCM; 10	NPS; 10	SBO; 11			6th	334	
