= 2023 CARS Tour =

27th season of the CARS Tour

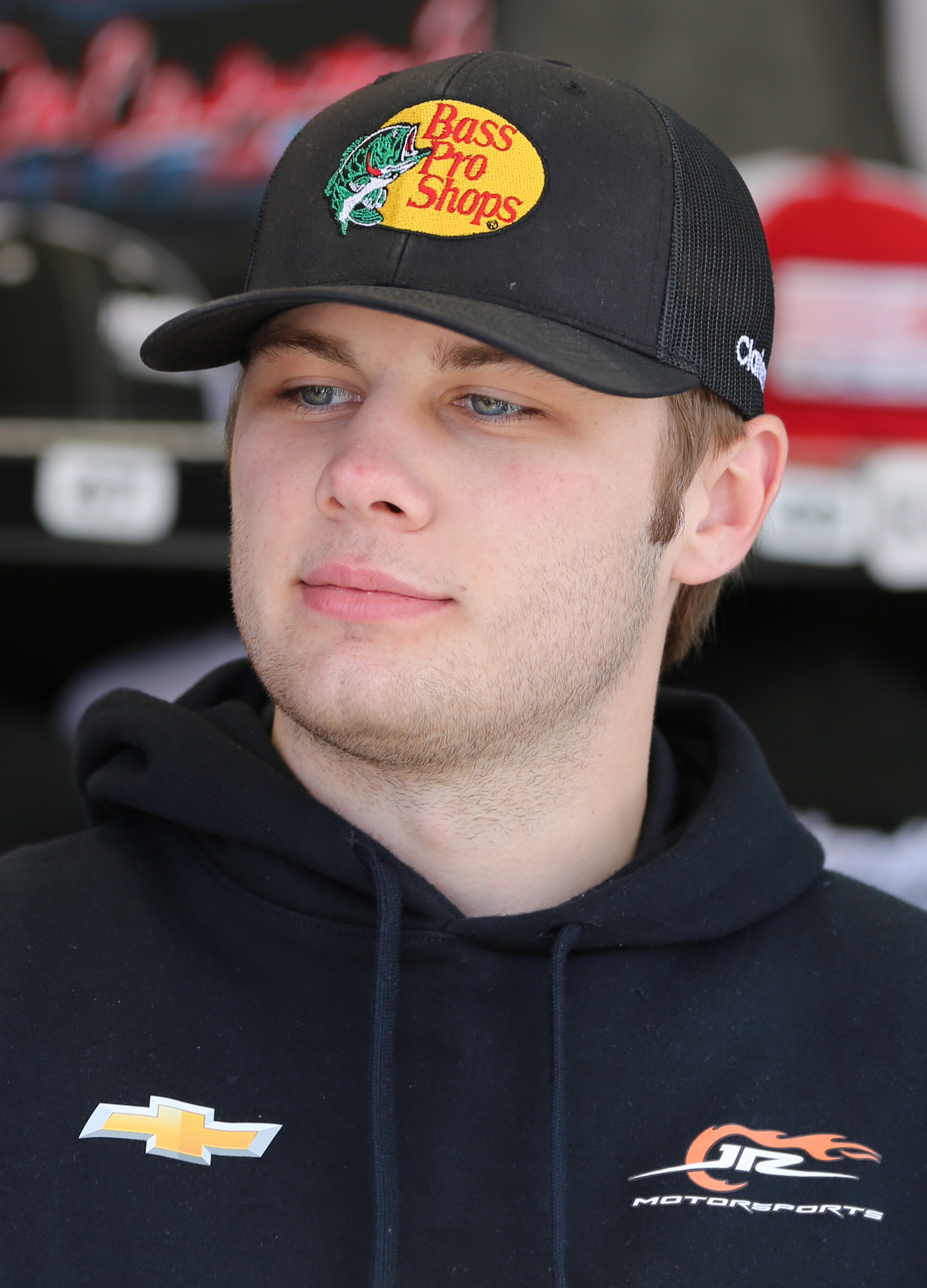
Carson Kvapil, the 2023 Late Model Stock Tour champion.

The 2023 CARS Tour was the 27th season of the Solid Rock Carriers CARS Tour, a stock car racing series. It began at Southern National Motorsports Park on March 2 and ended at North Wilkesboro Speedway on October 19. Carson Kvapil won the Late Model Stock Tour championship for the second straight year, while younger brother Caden Kvapil won the Pro Late Model Tour championship.

Carson Kvapil entered the season as the defending Late Model Stock Tour champion, while Luke Fenhaus entered as the Pro Late Model Tour champion. Fenhaus did not race in the series in 2023 after making the move to run full-time in the ARCA Menards Series East.

This was the first season under the acquisition of DEJ Management, Jeff Burton Autosports, Inc., Kevin Harvick Incorporated, and Trackhouse Racing.

== Schedule & results ==
Date	Track	Location	LMSC Winner	PLM Winner
March 11	Southern National Motorsports Park	Kenly, North Carolina	Deac McCaskill	Mike Hopkins
March 25	Florence Motor Speedway	Timmonsville, South Carolina	Carson Kvapil	N/A
April 22	Hickory Motor Speedway	Hickory, North Carolina	Carson Kvapil	Mike Hopkins
May 5	Ace Speedway	Altamahaw, North Carolina	Carson Kvapil	Connor Zilisch
May 17	North Wilkesboro Speedway	North Wilkesboro, North Carolina	Brenden Queen	Augie Grill
May 27	Tri-County Speedway	Granite Falls, North Carolina	N/A	Carson Kvapil
June 3	Langley Speedway	Hampton, Virginia	Connor Hall	N/A
June 10	Dillon Motor Speedway	Dillon, South Carolina	N/A	Tristan McKee
June 17	Dominion Raceway	Thornburg, Virginia	Bobby McCarty	N/A
June 28	Caraway Speedway	Asheboro, North Carolina	Jared Fryar	Caden Kvapil
July 8	Wake County Speedway	Raleigh, North Carolina	N/A	Logan Jones
July 29	Hickory Motor Speedway	Hickory, North Carolina	Mason Diaz	Cole Butcher
August 11	Ace Speedway	Altamahaw, North Carolina	Carson Kvapil	N/A
August 19	Tri-County Speedway	Granite Falls, North Carolina	Kaden Honeycutt	Caden Kvapil
August 26	Wake County Speedway	Raleigh, North Carolina	Carson Kvapil	N/A
September 9	New River All-American Speedway	Jacksonville, North Carolina	Brenden Queen	N/A
October 7	South Boston Speedway	South Boston, Virginia	Deac McCaskill	Nick Loden
October 21	Tri-County Speedway	Granite Falls, North Carolina	Brenden Queen	Caden Kvapil
November 4	Caraway Speedway	Sophia, North Carolina	Brenden Queen	Kaden Honeycutt

== Standings ==
=== Late Model Stock Car championship ===
(key) Bold – Pole position awarded by time. Italics – Pole position set by final practice results or rainout. * – Most laps led.

Pos	Driver	SNM	FLC	HCY	ACE	NWS	LGY	DOM	CRW	HCY	ACE	TCM	WCS	AAS	SBS	TCM	CRW	Points
1	Carson Kvapil	**2**	1	**1***	**1****	8	4	4	3	4	**1**	2	1*	5	5	4	11	495
2	Brenden Queen	7	2	10	4	**1***	2	**2***	6	3	5*	**16***	4	**1**	4	**1****	**1****	490
3	Mason Diaz	8	32	6	7	13	22	7	2	1	2	7	2	4	13	2	23	381
4	Bobby McCarty	10	7	30	5	28	6	1	5	5	24	4	7	12	3	6	2	375
5	Ryan Millington	5*	27	11	2	2	16	14	15	14	3	5	8	9	7	7	19	367
6	Chad McCumbee	11	11	4	11	7	7	8	26	9	12	27	5	7	10	8	9	357
7	Ronnie Bassett Jr.	16	3	26	19	14	18	25	25	6	6	3	3	3	11	23	5	322
8	Jacob Heafner	6	5	7	27	30	9	12	14	7	7	14	16	10	20	9	17	317
9	Landon Huffman			20	18	21	21	13	12	17	8	1	6	16	6	3	3	299
10	Brandon Pierce	14	16	14	10	18	11	11	17	8	23	12	12	11	19	27	8	297
11	Kaden Honeycutt	3		3	8	5	3*	26	4	26	4	18		6			6	287
12	Connor Hall	4	13	2	3	4	**1**	5	13	18	25					18	13	281
13	Mini Tyrrell	22	6	25	14	32	12	3	9	19	15	8	11	13	29	16	25	272
14	Deac McCaskill	1	17	5	13	35	15			11		21	20	8	1**	4		256
15	Chase Burrow	9	25	17	26	33	8	20	**22**	12	19	15	13	14	8	19	20	253
16	Andrew Grady	13	22	16	DNQ	37	14	18	10	22	10	17	18	15	16	24	16	235
17	Cameron Bolin	18	28	23	DNQ	20		17	8	20	18	10	17	19	18	22	21	205
18	Dylon Wilson	23	18	18	DNQ	26	24	21		28	21	13	14	17	22	21	18	180
19	Conner Jones		4	12	15	17		10				19		2	17			169
20	Layne Riggs			27	9	6	5		DSQ*	10		9			**2**			166
21	Jared Fryar	12	12			3			1			6					4	161
22	Connor Zilisch			8	12	36		9	16	16	11					15		146
23	Logan Clark							15	19	23	16	22		18	15	26	22	123
24	Zack Miracle	20	14	22	16	9				13							24	113
25	Carson Brown	25	15	24	21	22	25	16	20									96
26	Kade Brown			31						**2***		20			12	12		93
27	Trevor Ward			DNQ	28				23		9				9		12	85
28	William Sawalich			9	6	31			18							17		84
29	Lanie Buice		19	29					11							14	7	83
30	Bryant Barnhill		10	DNQ	23	27	19	19	28	25								81
31	Landon Pembelton	15	21	DNQ	24	34		6							24			78
32	Dylan Ward				20				29		22	24				13	14	75
33	Josh Dickens	27	20	DNQ	DNQ	29									14	11		65
34	Tate Fogleman	17	23	DNQ	DNQ	23		24			20							61
35	Cody Kelley		**9**	13														46
36	Austin McDaniel									21		11						34
37	Jason Kitzmiller	26	31			25			21									29
38	Stephen Nasse															5		28
39	Blake Stallings										14				25			27
40	Clay Jones												**9**					27
41	Ryan Glenski		8		DNQ													27
42	Jonathan Findley	21						22				31						26
43	Kyle Larson								7									26
44	Riley Gentry			28						27		23				29		25
45	Brent Crews									24	17							25
46	Gio Ruggiero												21			20		25
47	Cale Gale	19	24	DNQ														24
48	Dexter Canipe Jr.				17							25						24
49	Chase Briscoe					10												23
50	Heath Causey																10	23
51	Mason Bailey												10					23
52	Ryan Matthews						10											23
53	Kevin Harvick					11												22
54	Charlie Watson			15								29						21
55	D. J. Canipe									15		30						21
56	Brad Keselowski					12												21
57	Jonathan Shafer										13							20
58	Justin Carroll						13											20
59	Buddy Isles Jr.												15					18
60	Coy Beard																15	18
61	Daniel Suárez					15												18
62	Blake Lothian	24	26	DNQ														17
63	Dale Earnhardt Jr.					16												17
64	Ryan Wilson	29	30	DNQ	25							32						16
65	Isabella Robusto	30	29	21														16
66	Terry Carroll						17											16
67	Colby Howard			19														14
68	Ethan Johnson												19					14
69	Ross Chastain					19												14
70	Chris Burns													20				13
71	Matt Waltz						20											13
72	Kenny Wallace														21			12
73	Garrett Smithley				22													11
74	Cole Bruce						23											10
75	Mike Looney							23										10
76	Ronald Hill														23			10
77	Matt Gould								24									9
78	Tyler Ankrum					24												9
79	Jeremy Mayfield								30			28						8
80	Bryce Applegate															25		8
81	Daniel Webster											26						7
82	Jacob Borst														26			7
83	Ryley Music						26											7
84	Carter Langley														27			6
85	Jason York								27									6
86	Jody Measemer	28																5
87	Stacy Puryear														28			5
88	Timothy Peters															28		5
89	Ashton Higgins			32														2
90	Brian Obeidzenski	31																2
91	Jessica Cann	32																2
92	Thomas Scott				DNQ													2
93	Tyler Gregory			DNQ														1
94	Harrison Burton					DNS												0
Pos	Driver	SNM	FLC	HCY	ACE	NWS	LGY	DOM	CRW	HCY	ACE	TCM	WCS	AAS	SBS	TCM	CRW	Points

=== Pro Late Model Tour championship ===
(key) Bold – Pole position awarded by time. Italics – Pole position set by final practice results or rainout. * – Most laps led.

Pos	Driver	SNM	HCY	ACE	NWS	TCM	DIL	CRW	WCS	HCY	TCM	SBS	TCM	CRW	Points
1	Caden Kvapil	8	11	**2***	8	3	12	1*	**7***	2	**1***	3	1	**2***	391
2	Katie Hettinger	5	6	3	5	6	2	2	3	4	6	6	14*		335
3	Ashton Higgins	7	8	17	14	17	5*	9	10	14	5	7	12	13	293
4	Logan Jones	10	28	11	36	9	9	10	1	10	10	9	4	7	282
5	Austin MacDonald	11	20	14	38	10	6	16	4	3	7	4	4		267
6	George Phillips	14	25	16	19	20	**8**	15	6	9		10		5	218
7	Joshua Horniman	18	14	24	29		11	13	8	17	14	13	9	12	212
8	Rusty Skewes	17	16	15	30	18	DNQ	14	9	13	11	16	18	11	207
9	Tristan McKee	24	10	20	4	7	1	8	DNS	16	16				195
10	Kyle Campbell	13	26	18	22	15	7	11	2	19	9				188
11	Connor Zilisch		**3**	1	3			**6**		**6**					157
12	Cole Butcher					4		4		1**	3	2*			157
13	Brett Suggs	9	13	7	34	12	13	12		12					156
14	Dawson Sutton		5	8	39	8		7			2		16		154
15	Nick Loden	12	21	19	37					7	13	**1**	**15**		152
16	Gavan Boschele	16	9			2					4		13		120
17	Mike Hopkins	1*	1	6	10										119
18	Brent Crews		2	5	6								5		114
19	Charlie Keeven									22	17	8	6	8	103
20	T. J. DeCaire			4	26		3			5					95
21	Lee Tissot		12	10	27	13					15				88
22	Gio Ruggiero					5	4		5						86
23	Luke Morey	3	15	21	28	19									79
24	Clint King			9	DNQ		10				8				74
25	Aiden King											12	8	6	72
26	Luke Baldwin		7	22	24					8					71
27	Kris Wright				DNQ					15		11	11		63
28	Justin Crider	**4**								18			17		62
29	Zak Fowler	20	29	12	DNQ	16									57
30	Ryan Moore											5	7		53
31	Jeff Batten	22	24	23						11					52
32	Tyler Church				18					20			10		50
33	Justin Whitaker	19	23	13	33										47
34	Michael Lichtfeld		22		23									9	45
35	Isabella Robusto	6	19*												43
36	Augie Grill				**1***										37
37	Carson Kvapil					**1***									37
38	Bryan Kruczek	2			40										34
39	Kaden Honeycutt													1	34
40	Matt Craig		4		31										32
41	Corey Heim				2										32
42	Tate Fogleman							3							30
43	Chase Burda												2		30
44	Jimmy Renfrew Jr.													3	30
45	Brandon Setzer												3		29
46	Justin Hicks							5							28
47	Dylan Garner	21	18												27
48	Jeb Burton				7										26
49	Cory Casagrande				DNQ									10	25
50	Trevor Sanborn				9										24
51	Dylan Cappello				11										22
52	William Sawalich					11									22
53	Jackson Boone				12										21
54	Carson Lucas				DNQ							14			21
55	Levie Jones										12				21
56	John Bolen				13										20
57	Mamba Smith					14									19
58	Carter Langley	15													18
59	Hudson Canipe		27			21									18
60	Seth Christensen				15										18
61	Jeff Fultz											15			18
62	Bret Holmes				16										17
63	Jadyn Daniels		17												16
64	Carson Hocevar				17										16
65	Justice Calabro							17							16
66	Jordan Taylor				20										13
67	Tyler Gregory				21										12
68	Matt Caprara									21					12
69	Logan Boyett	23													10
70	Dustin Smith				25										8
71	Garrett Smithley				32										3
72	Josh Lowder				35										3
73	Nick Egan				DNQ										2
74	Jarrett Butcher				DNQ										2
75	Michael Hinde				DNQ										2
76	Jordan Miller				DNQ										2
77	Brandon Marhefka				DNQ										2
78	Holt Halder				DNQ										2
79	John Aramendia				DNQ										2
80	Chris Phipps				DNQ										2
Pos	Driver	SNM	HCY	ACE	NWS	TCM	DIL	CRW	WCS	HCY	TCM	SBS	TCM	CRW	Points

== See also ==
- 2023 NASCAR Cup Series
- 2023 NASCAR Xfinity Series
- 2023 NASCAR Craftsman Truck Series
- 2023 ARCA Menards Series
- 2023 ARCA Menards Series East
- 2023 ARCA Menards Series West
- 2023 NASCAR Whelen Modified Tour
- 2023 NASCAR Pinty's Series
- 2023 NASCAR Mexico Series
- 2023 NASCAR Whelen Euro Series
- 2023 NASCAR Brasil Sprint Race
- 2023 SRX Series
- 2023 SMART Modified Tour
- 2023 ASA STARS National Tour
