= Cody Kelley =

American racing driver

- Born: Hartsville, South Carolina, U.S.

CARS Late Model Stock Tour career
- Debut season: 2023
- Years active: 2023–present
- Starts: 7
- Championships: 0
- Wins: 0
- Poles: 1
- Best finish: 35th in 2023
- Statistics up to date as of October 18, 2026.

Cody Kelley (birth date unknown) is an American professional stock car racing driver. He currently competes in the zMAX CARS Tour, driving the No. 13 Chevrolet for Cody Kelley Racing. He is the twin brother of fellow driver Casey Kelley, who also competes in late-model racing.

Before the 2026 season, Kelley competed in Kaulig Racing's "Race For the Seat", competing against 14 other drivers to try to win a full-season ride in the team's No. 14 truck.

Kelley has also competed in the Virginia Late Model Triple Crown Series, the I-95 Showdown Series, the Atlantic Turfscapes Super Truck Series, and the NASCAR Weekly Series, and is a frequent competitor at Florence Motor Speedway.

== Motorsports results ==
=== CARS Late Model Stock Car Tour ===
(key) (Bold – Pole position awarded by qualifying time. Italics – Pole position earned by points standings or practice time. * – Most laps led. ** – All laps led.)

CARS Late Model Stock Car Tour results
Year	Team	No.	Make	1	2	3	4	5	6	7	8	9	10	11	12	13	14	15	16	17	CLMSCTC	Pts	Ref
2023	AK Performance	98	Chevy	SNM	**FLC**; 9	HCY; 13	ACE	NWS	LGY	DOM	CRW	HCY	ACE	TCM	WKS	AAS	SBO	TCM	CRW		35th	46	
2024	Cody Kelley Racing	13	Chevy	SNM	HCY	AAS	OCS	ACE	TCM	LGY	DOM	CRW	HCY	NWS	ACE	WCS	FLC; 17	SBO	TCM	NWS	N/A	0	
2025	Cody Kelley Racing	13	Chevy	AAS	WCS	CDL	OCS	ACE	NWS	LGY	DOM	CRW	HCY	AND	FLC; 4	SBO	TCM	NWS			53rd	38	
2026	Cody Kelley Racing	13	Chevy	SNM	WCS	NSV	CRW	ACE	LGY	DOM	NWS	HCY	AND; 15	FLC; 3	TCM	NPS					40th	85	
2026	Chad Bryant Racing	77K	Chevy														SBO; 23				40th	85	
