= Kade Brown =

American racing driver (born 2006)

- Born: Kade Allan Brown; May 30, 2006 (age 20) Denver, North Carolina, U.S.

CARS Late Model Stock Tour career
- Debut season: 2022
- Years active: 2022–present
- Former teams: Matt Piercy Racing, R&S Race Cars
- Starts: 42
- Championships: 0
- Wins: 0
- Poles: 1
- Best finish: 3rd in 2025
- Statistics up to date as of September 4, 2026.

Kade Allan Brown (born May 30, 2006) is an American professional stock car racing driver. He currently competes in the zMAX CARS Tour, driving the No. 23 Dodge for Timothy Tyrrell Racing, and the IHRA Stock Car Series, driving the No. 17 Chevrolet for Saville-Millington Motorsports. He is a former track champion at Hickory Motor Speedway and Florence Motor Speedway, and is a former winner of the South Carolina 400.

Before the 2026 season, Brown competed in Kaulig Racing's "Race For the Seat", competing against 14 other drivers to try to win a full-season ride in the teams No. 14 truck.

Brown has also competed in series such as the Virginia Late Model Triple Crown Series, the Southeast Legends Tour, the INEX Summer Shootout, and the NASCAR Weekly Series.

== Motorsports results ==
=== CARS Late Model Stock Car Tour ===
(key) (Bold – Pole position awarded by qualifying time. Italics – Pole position earned by points standings or practice time. * – Most laps led. ** – All laps led.)

CARS Late Model Stock Car Tour results
Year	Team	No.	Make	1	2	3	4	5	6	7	8	9	10	11	12	13	14	15	16	17	CLMSCTC	Pts	Ref
2022	N/A	16B	Chevy	CRW	HCY	GRE	AAS	FCS	LGY	DOM	HCY	ACE	MMS	NWS	TCM	ACE	SBO	CRW; 18			63rd	15	
2023	Matt Piercy Racing	23	Chevy	SNM	FLC	HCY; 31	ACE	NWS	LGY	DOM	CRW			TCM; 20	WKS	AAS	SBO; 12	TCM; 12	CRW		26th	93	
2023	Matt Piercy Racing	44S	Chevy									**HCY**; 2*	ACE								26th	93	
2024	Matt Piercy Racing	23	Chevy	SNM; 25	HCY; 7	AAS; 12	OCS; 25	ACE; 21	TCM; 5	LGY; 19	DOM; 29	CRW; 25	HCY; 4	NWS; 29	ACE; 12	WCS; 8	FLC; 13	SBO; 12	TCM; 29	NWS	12th	254	
2025	R&S Race Cars	4	Chevy	AAS; 8	WCS; 4	CDL; 6	OCS; 2	ACE; 6	NWS; 14	LGY; 10	DOM; 15	CRW; 8		AND; 8	FLC; 8	SBO; 8	TCM; 11	NWS; 8			3rd	509	
2025	R&S Race Cars	19	Chevy										HCY; 6								3rd	509	
2026	Timothy Tyrrell Racing	23	Dodge	SNM	WCS	NSV; 28															38th	87	
2026	MKM Racing Development	32	Toyota				CRW; DNQ	ACE	LGY	DOM											38th	87	
2026	Travis Byrd Racing	23	Chevy								NWS; 32		AND; 24	FLC; 27	TCM; Wth	NPS	SBO				38th	87	
2026	Travis Byrd Racing	28	Chevy									HCY; 17									38th	87	

=== IHRA Late Model Sportsman Series ===
(key) (Bold – Pole position awarded by qualifying time. Italics – Pole position earned by points standings or practice time. * – Most laps led. ** – All laps led.)

IHRA Late Model Sportsman Series
Year	Team	No.	Make	1	2	3	ISCSS	Pts	Ref
2026	Saville-Millington Motorsports	17	Chevy	DUB; 4	CDL; 2	AND; 13	2nd	127	
