= Taylor Stricklin =

American racing driver

- Born: October 25, 1988 (age 38) Mount Ulla, North Carolina, U.S.

CARS Super Late Model Tour career
- Debut season: 2016
- Years active: 2016, 2018
- Starts: 5
- Championships: 0
- Wins: 0
- Poles: 0
- Best finish: 17th in 2018
- Statistics up to date as of November 25, 2025.

Taylor Strickin (born October 25, 1988) is an American professional stock car racing driver and team owner who competed in the CARS Super Late Model Tour from 2016 to 2018. He is the son and grandson of former NASCAR drivers Hut Stricklin and Donnie Allison respectively.

Stricklin is the owner of Taylor Stricklin Racing, a team which competes in late model racing.

Stricklin has also competed in the Carolina Pro Late Model Series, the Show Me The Money Pro Late Model Series, the UARA STARS Late Model Series, and the NASCAR Weekly Series.

== Motorsports results ==
=== CARS Super Late Model Tour ===
(key)

CARS Super Late Model Tour results
| Year | Team | No. | Make | 1 | 2 | 3 | 4 | 5 | 6 | 7 | 8 | 9 | 10 | CSLMTC | Pts | Ref |
|---|---|---|---|---|---|---|---|---|---|---|---|---|---|---|---|---|
| 2016 | Taylor Stricklin Racing | 7S | Ford | SNM | ROU | HCY | TCM | GRE | ROU | CON | MYB | HCY; 12 | SNM | 51st | 21 | |
| 2018 | Taylor Stricklin Racing | 7S | Toyota | MYB; 16 | NSH | ROU | | | | | | SBO; 10 | | 17th | 70 | |
| 2018 | Taylor Stricklin Racing | 7 | Toyota | | | | HCY; 9 | BRI | AND | | | | | 17th | 70 | |
| 2018 | Taylor Stricklin Racing | 12 | Toyota | | | | | | | HCY; 27 | ROU | | | 17th | 70 | |
