= Anderson Motor Speedway =

Motorsport track in the United States

- Location: 313 Irby Rd; Anderson, South Carolina; 29697
- Coordinates: 34.6608°N 82.5854°W
- Owner: Justin Foster
- Operator: Scott Childress
- Broke ground: 1962
- Opened: 1963
- Architect: Rupert Porter
- Major events: Current: Marty Ward Memorial (2024-present); CARS Tour; Late Model Stock Tour (2017, 2025–present); Pro Late Model Tour (2025-present); Super Late Model Tour (2017-2018); IHRA Stock Car Series (2026); SMART Modified Tour (2000-2001, 2025-present); Former: NASCAR; Goody's Dash Series (1988-1990); Busch All-Star Tour (1985-1986)
- Website: andersonmotorspeedway.com

Paved Oval (1987–present)
- Surface: Asphalt
- Length: 0.375 mi (0.604 km)
- Turns: 4
- Banking: 14°
- Race lap record: 12.907 (Davey Hamilton Jr., Sprint Car, 2026)

Dirt Oval (1963–1986)
- Surface: Dirt
- Length: 0.375 mi (0.604 km)
- Turns: 4

Anderson Motor Speedway is a 0.375 mi (0.604 km) oval short track in Anderson County, South Carolina. The track currently holds events for the CARS Tour and the IHRA Stock Car Series. It has also previously held lower-tier NASCAR Goody's Dash Series races from 1988 to 1990. Anderson is owned by Justin Foster and led by track promoter Scott Childress.

The track’s weekly divisions include Limited Late Model's, Legend Car's, Street Stock's, Mini Stock's, and Front Wheel Drive's, as well as BM Modified's, all running under NASCAR sanctioning through the NASCAR Local Racing Series.

== Description ==
=== Configuration ===
Anderson Motor Speedway (AMS) since its inception has been measured at 0.375 mi (0.604 km), with 14° of banking in the corners.

=== Amenities ===
The track is served by Interstate 85, with their physical address being alongside South Carolina Highway 81. The track reports its capacity as being able to hold over 5,000. The city of Anderson is nearby.

== History ==
Jim LaBarbera in a Limited Late Model at Anderson in 2022.

Anderson was built by Rupert Porter and opened in 1963. Initially a dirt oval to start its life, until 1987, the track while as a dirt track held weekly racing as well as National Dirt Racing Association (NDRA) events as well as the NASCAR Busch All-Star Tour until the end of 1986.

In 1987, the track was paved, and the NASCAR Goody's Dash Series would be added to the schedule at the track.

Rupert Porter would pass away in 2009, having owned and operated the track since its opening in 1963. After Porter's passing in 2009, his wife and daughter, Shirley and Sylvia Porter, would presume control of the track.

In 2024, the track was purchased by Scott Childress, who formerly ran operations at nearby Lavonia Speedway.

== Marty Ward Memorial Winners ==
| Year | Name | Manufacturer | Date | Ref |
|---|---|---|---|---|
| 2024 | Thomas Beane | Chevrolet | May 31 | |
| 2025 | Kade Brown | Chevrolet | May 23 | |
| 2026 | Cody Kelley | Chevrolet | June 6 | |

== NASCAR results ==
=== NASCAR Goody's Dash Series results ===
| Year | Date | Winner | Make | Pole | Make | Ref |
|---|---|---|---|---|---|---|
| 1988 | August 5 | Larry Caudill | Pontiac | Mike Watts | Oldsmobile | |
| 1989 | July 28 | Robert Pressley | Pontiac | N/A | N/A | |
| 1990 | June 1 | Mickey York | Pontiac | Gary Wade Finley | Pontiac | |

=== NASCAR Busch All-Star Tour results ===
| Year | Date | Winner | Make | Ref |
|---|---|---|---|---|
| 1985 | April 7 | Billy Clanton | N/A | |
| 1986 | April 11 | Mike Head | Pontiac | |
| 1986 | July 1 | Buck Simmons | N/A | |
