= Hailie Deegan =

American racing driver (born 2001)

- Deegan at Madera Speedway in 2026
- Born: Hailie Rochelle Deegan; July 18, 2001 (age 25); Temecula, California, U.S.
- Partners: Chase Cabre (2020–present)
- Parent: Brian Deegan (father)
- Relatives: Haiden Deegan (brother); Collin Cabre (brother-in-law)

Indy NXT career
- Debut season: 2025
- Current team: HMD Motorsports
- Car number: 38
- Starts: 14
- Championships: 0
- Wins: 0
- Podiums: 0
- Poles: 0
- Fastest laps: 0
- Best finish: 14th in 2025

NASCAR O'Reilly Auto Parts Series career
- 18 races run over 2 years
- 2024 position: 32nd
- Best finish: 32nd (2024)
- First race: 2022 Alsco Uniforms 302 (Las Vegas)
- Last race: 2024 Tennessee Lottery 250 (Nashville)
Wins	Top tens	Poles
0	0	0

NASCAR FedEx Freight Truck Series career
- 69 races run over 4 years
- 2023 position: 19th
- Best finish: 17th (2021)
- First race: 2020 Clean Harbors 200 (Kansas)
- Last race: 2023 Craftsman 150 (Phoenix)
Wins	Top tens	Poles
0	5	0

ARCA Menards Series career
- 27 races run over 3 years
- ARCA no., team: No. 16 (Bill McAnally Racing)
- Best finish: 3rd (2020)
- First race: 2019 Sioux Chief PowerPEX 200 (Toledo)
- Last race: 2026 General Tire 150 (Phoenix)
Wins	Top tens	Poles
0	21	0

ARCA Menards Series East career
- 16 races run over 3 years
- Best finish: 10th (2019)
- First race: 2018 New Smyrna 175 (New Smyrna)
- Last race: 2020 Bush's Beans 200 (Bristol)
Wins	Top tens	Poles
0	5	0

ARCA Menards Series West career
- 41 races run over 3 years
- ARCA West no., team: No. 16 (Bill McAnally Racing)
- Best finish: 3rd (2019)
- First race: 2018 Bakersfield 175 presented by NAPA Auto Parts (Bakersfield)
- Last race: 2026 NAPA Auto Parts 150 (Bakersfield)
- First win: 2018 NAPA Auto Parts Idaho 208 (Meridian)
- Last win: 2026 NAPA Auto Parts 150 (Bakersfield)
Wins	Top tens	Poles
5	32	5
- Statistics up to date as of November 1, 2026.

Awards
- 2021–2023 2018: NASCAR Craftsman Truck Series Most Popular Driver; K&N Pro Series West Rookie of the Year

Hailie Rochelle Deegan (born July 18, 2001) is an American professional racing driver who currently competes full-time in the ARCA Menards Series West driving the No. 16 Chevrolet SS for Bill McAnally Racing, She formerly competed in the NASCAR Xfinity Series.

Deegan grew up racing off-road and on dirt, but transitioned to competing on asphalt in 2016 to pursue a career in stock car racing. She began her career in NASCAR in 2018 in the NASCAR K&N Pro Series West. She became the first female driver to have won races in the West Series, doing so in the 2018 and 2019 seasons.

In 2025, Deegan made a brief move to American open-wheel racing, driving the No. 38 entry for HMD Motorsports in Indy NXT, before returning to stock car racing in the ARCA Menards Series West in 2026, where she found success with two wins.

== Off-road racing ==
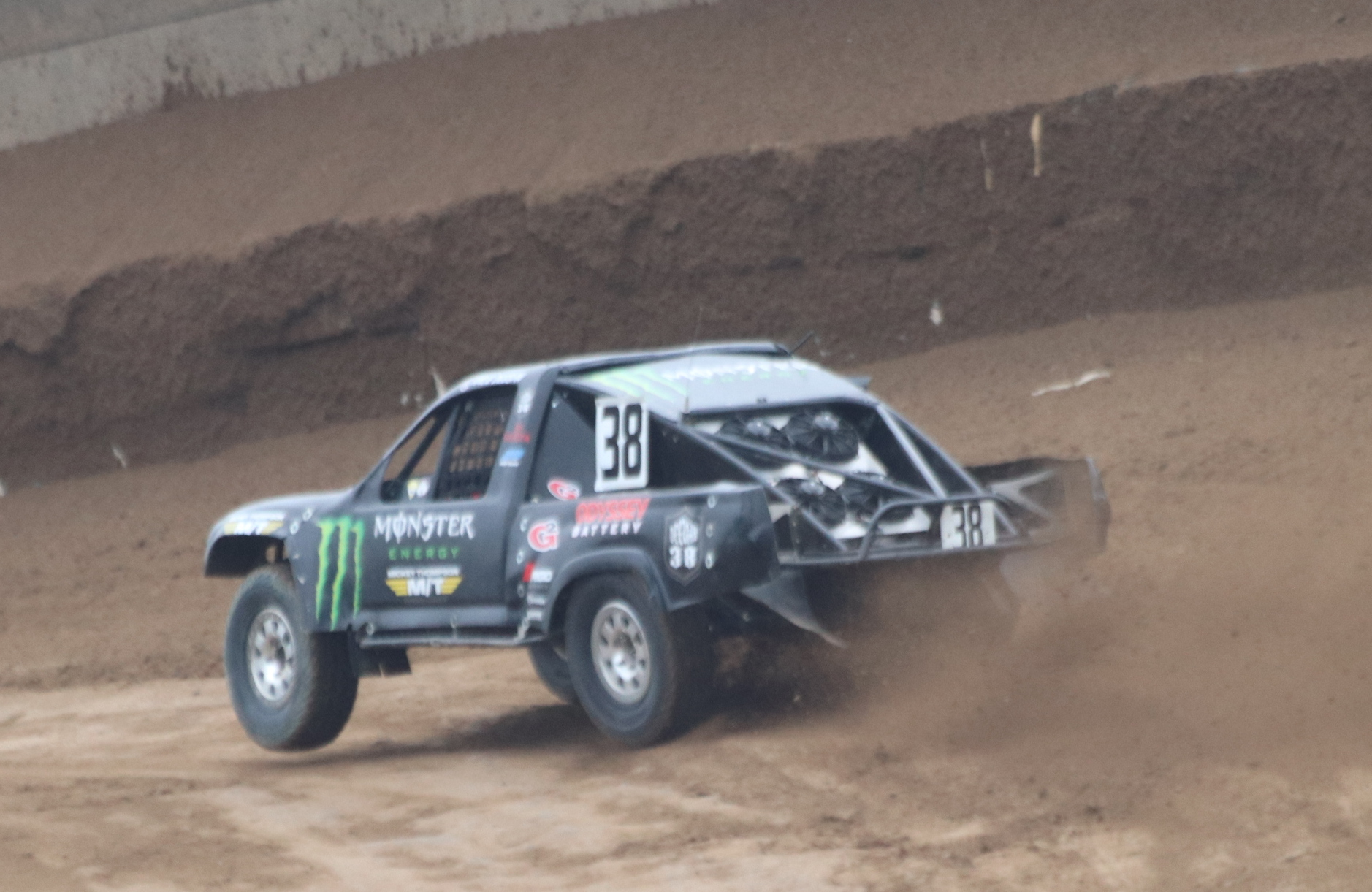
Deegan racing in Pro Lite at Crandon in 2018.

Deegan began riding dirt bikes at age seven, and started competing in short course off-road racing after being gifted a Trophy Kart for her eighth birthday. In 2009, she won in her first race in the SXS Stadium Series' Trophy Kart class. She also raced in the Lucas Oil Off Road Racing Series (LOORRS) Junior 1 Karts' final two races at Primm Valley Motorsports Complex. In 2013, she became the first female driver to win a LOORRS championship when she won the Junior 2 Karts class. Deegan became the Modified Kart Regional Champion in 2015 and became the Modified Kart National Champion the following year. She was also named 2016 Lucas Oil Off Road Driver of the Year. Deegan continued to race full-time in the Pro Lite division of the Lucas Oil Off Road Racing Series in 2017. She is one of four women to win a LOORRS class championship in its history alongside Corry Weller, Kali Kinsman, and Megan Mitchell.

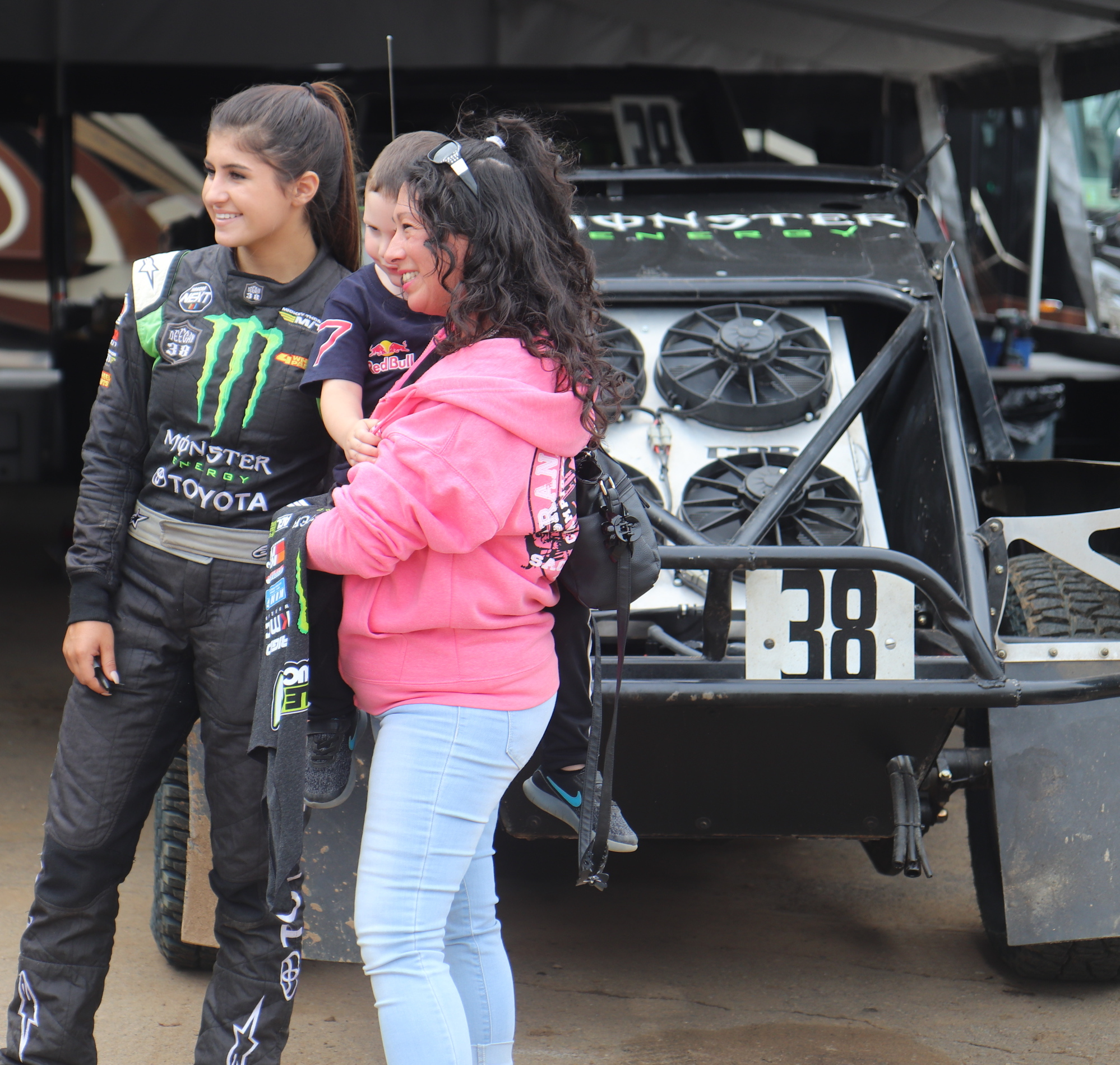
Deegan taking pictures with fans at Crandon in 2018.

After moving to pavement racing, Deegan occasionally returned to off-road. In December 2021, she participated in the Nitro Rallycross side-by-side (SXS) support class at Florida International Rally and Motorsports Park, where she finished fifth and fourth in two races. When the Truck Series had a weekend off on March 11–13, 2022, Deegan made her Mint 400 debut in the Unlimited Truck Spec class.

== Asphalt racing ==
In 2016, Deegan began her transition to asphalt racing by driving legends cars for Rev Racing. In 2017, she made her asphalt late model debut with a pair of CARS Super Late Model Tour starts, first at Tri-County Motor Speedway, and later at Hickory Motor Speedway.

=== NASCAR ===
Deegan was a NASCAR Drive for Diversity member in 2016, and she received the NASCAR Diversity Young Racer award the following year. In May 2017, Deegan was one of nine drivers named to the 2017 NASCAR Next class, in which she was both the youngest member and the only woman. She also became a member of Toyota's driver development program.

==== 2018: K&N Pro Series, first victory ====
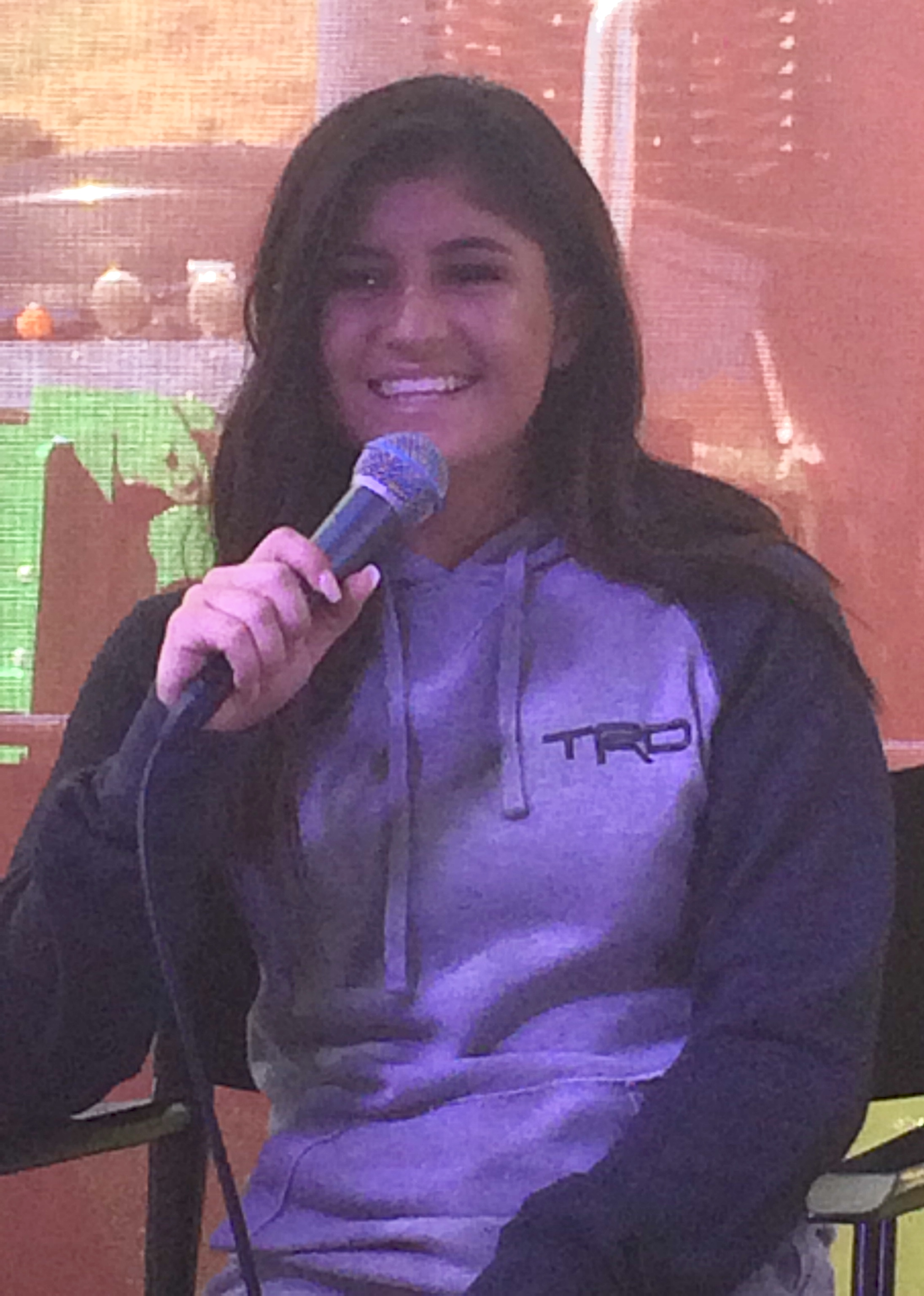
Deegan at the K&N Pro Series West race at Sonoma Raceway.

On January 3, 2018, Deegan was announced as a full-time driver in the NASCAR K&N Pro Series West for Bill McAnally Racing (BMR), a team that had won the West Series championship each of the three previous seasons. It was announced that she would also run a part-time schedule for McAnally in the NASCAR K&N Pro Series East. Deegan was the only female driver who competed full-time in either 2018 K&N Series. Deegan made her debut in the season-opening East Series race at New Smyrna Speedway on February 11, where she started ninth but retired on lap nineteen due to mechanical problems. On March 15, Deegan made her West Series debut at Kern County Raceway Park, finishing seventh. Kevin Harvick, NASCAR's 2014 Sprint Cup Series champion (who finished fourth), battled for position with Deegan at the end of the race and was impressed with her performance, saying, "If I had to pick one person to say, 'Alright, that's the person [Kevin Harvick Incorporated] would want to represent and has the most potential,' it would probably be Hailie Deegan. She did really, really well." On May 15, Deegan was announced as a NASCAR Next class member for the second straight year as one of four drivers returning to the program from the previous season. Among those in the 2018–19 class, she was once again the only woman as well as the youngest member. She scored her first career top-five finish on May 19, finishing fourth at Orange Show Speedway.

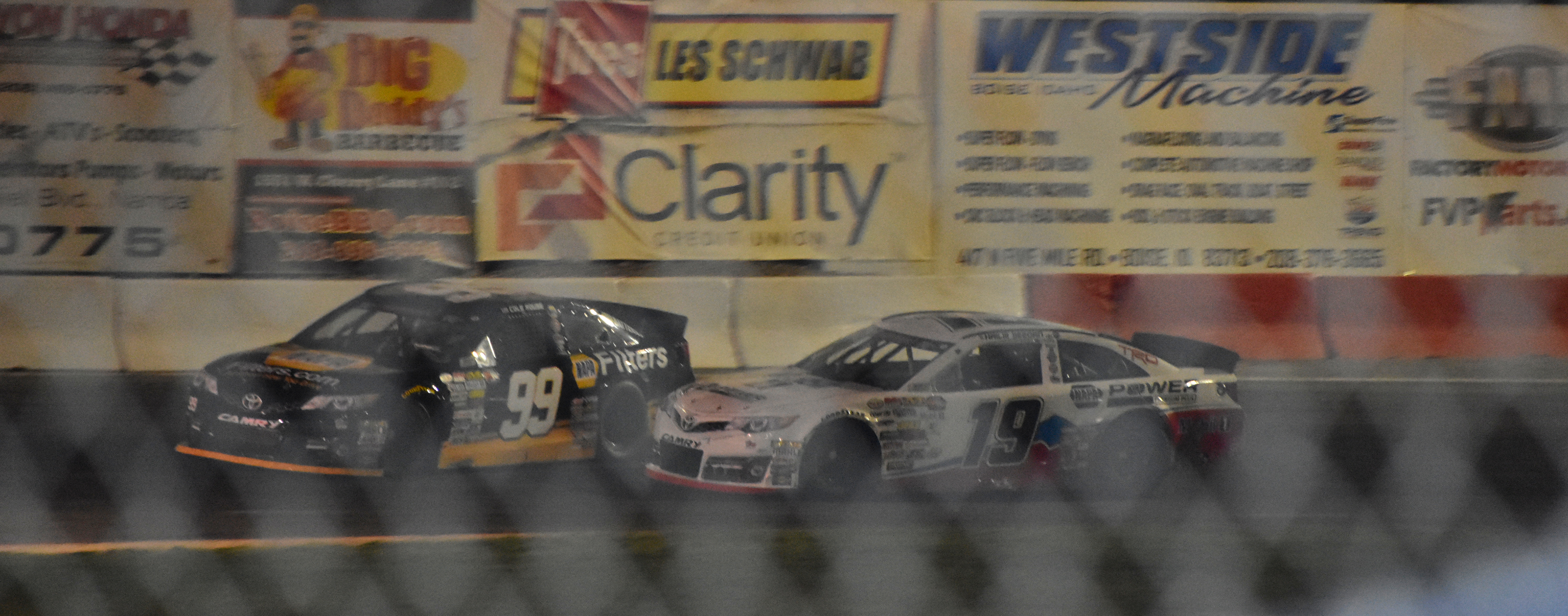
Deegan's last lap bump and run on Rouse to score her first K&N West victory

At Sonoma, Deegan qualified third and received her high school diploma during driver introductions. She went on to finish seventh in the race, earning her sixth top-ten finish in six West Series races. In her next race at Roseburg, Deegan finished second behind her BMR teammate, Derek Kraus, setting a new mark for her best career finish in the series and tying Kenzie Ruston, Nicole Behar, and Julia Landauer (all of whom are also NASCAR Next alumni) for the record for best K&N Pro Series finish by a woman.

At the Dirt Track at Las Vegas Motor Speedway, Deegan qualified on pole position for the Star Nursery 100, becoming the first woman in NASCAR history to win a pole at the K&N level. Despite a shifter issue during the first half of the race, she led thirteen laps and equalled her career best result of second in the event. On September 29, Deegan became the first woman to win at the K&N Pro Series level, taking the victory at the NAPA Auto Parts Idaho 208 at Meridian Speedway in Idaho. Deegan passed her BMR teammate Cole Rouse on the final lap, which ended up being the only lap she led throughout the race. Her win was the second for a woman in a NASCAR touring series race, the first being Shawna Robinson's one win in the 1980s in the now-defunct NASCAR Dash Series. With a sixth-place finish two races later at the K&N West season finale at Kern County, Deegan closed the year by clinching Rookie of the Year honors for the series.

==== 2019: Return to K&N competition, ARCA debut ====
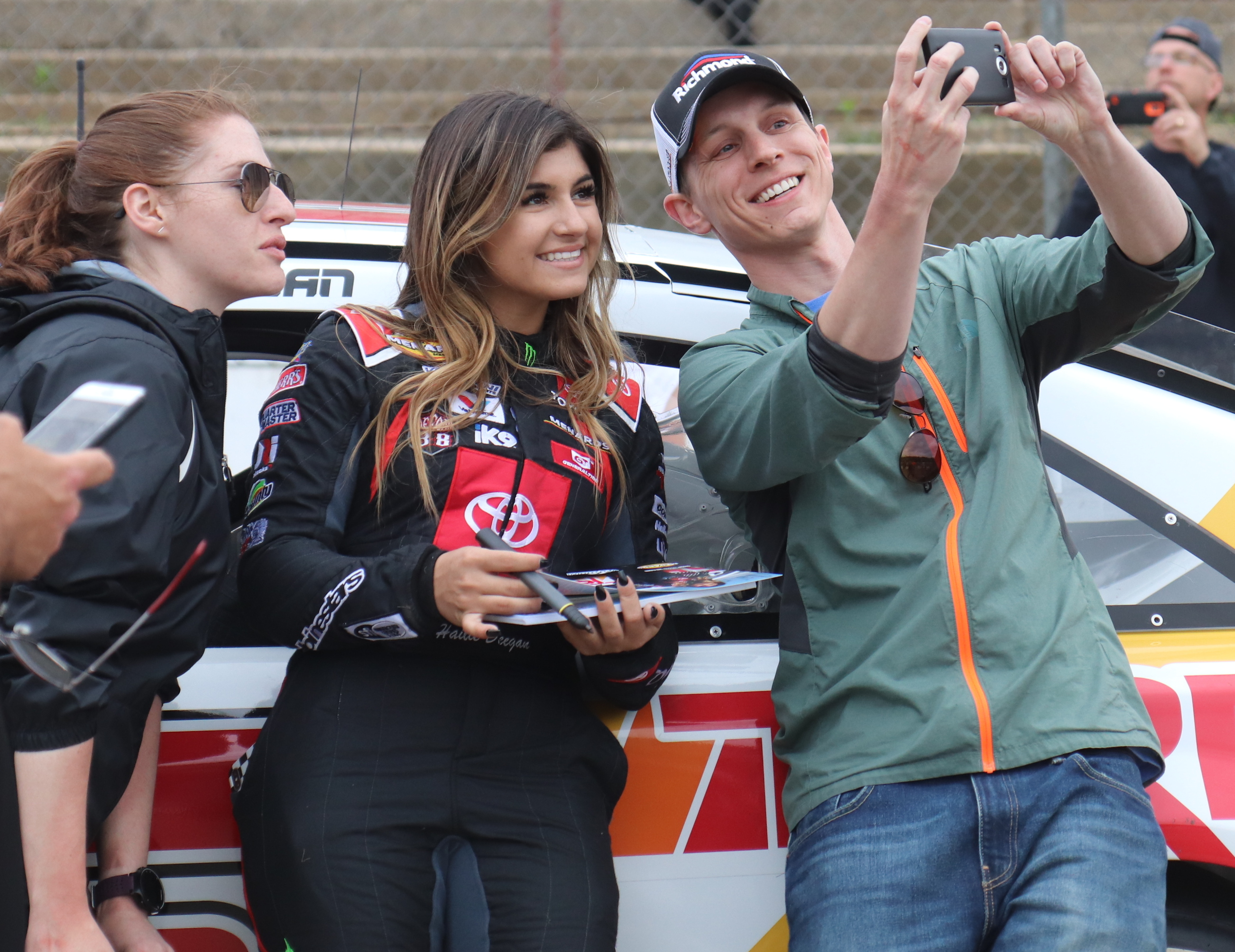
Deegan taking pictures with fans before an ARCA Menards Series race at Madison International Speedway

Deegan returned to BMR in 2019 for another full and partial schedule in the K&N West and East Series respectively. At the East season-opening race at New Smyrna, qualifying was rained out, allowing Deegan to inherit pole position after setting the fastest practice time. Deegan led the first six laps but eventually retired from the race, finishing sixteenth after suffering a mechanical issue at New Smyrna for the second consecutive year. Prior to the 2019 season, the Dirt Track at Las Vegas Motor Speedway's race date was moved to serve as the season-opening race for the West Series. Deegan earned her second career K&N Pro Series win in the event with another last-lap pass, this time on Sunrise Ford Racing's Jagger Jones.

On March 1, 2019, Deegan announced plans to compete in six races for Venturini Motorsports in the ARCA Menards Series. Deegan made her series debut at Toledo in Venturini's No. 55 Toyota Camry on May 19. She ranked twelfth in both practice and qualifying, finishing eighteenth and last after being involved in a crash with Joe Graf Jr. At Colorado National Speedway, Deegan earned her third career K&N West win, though some deemed the victory controversial as she spun out Kraus, her teammate, for the win on the final lap. Deegan took pole position at the following race in Sonoma, though she never led a lap in the race and finished eighth after late-race contact with teammate Lawless Alan.

In August, Deegan made her debut for the DGR-Crosley team at the second K&N East race at Bristol. Despite having originally announced the race as part of her schedule with Venturini, she confirmed she would run the event for DGR in their No. 54 Toyota Camry. At the combined East and West Series race at Gateway later that month, Deegan struggled and only managed a ninth-place finish while also sparking an argument with series veteran Todd Souza. Deegan and Souza made contact late in the race, with Souza calling her driving "disrespectful."

Deegan scored her first ARCA top-five finish in October at Indianapolis Raceway Park. The following weekend, she had a strong performance at Roseville in K&N West, setting the fastest time in both practice sessions, winning the pole, and finishing second in the race. Deegan ended the 2019 season with a fourth-place finish at ISM Raceway, clinching third in the final championship point standings.

==== 2020: Move to Ford and DGR-Crosley, Truck debut ====
Deegan switched from Toyota's development driver program to Ford's at the end of 2019, signing a full-time ARCA Menards Series contract with DGR-Crosley, which themselves had announced a move to Ford the previous week. She cited Toyota's lack of available teams relative to their number of drivers as the reason for the switch, explaining, "there's so many Toyota drivers and there's not many seats. I think we made the best decision for my career long-term." Deegan's father Brian stated that she would focus on ARCA in 2020 to prepare her for the higher levels of NASCAR.

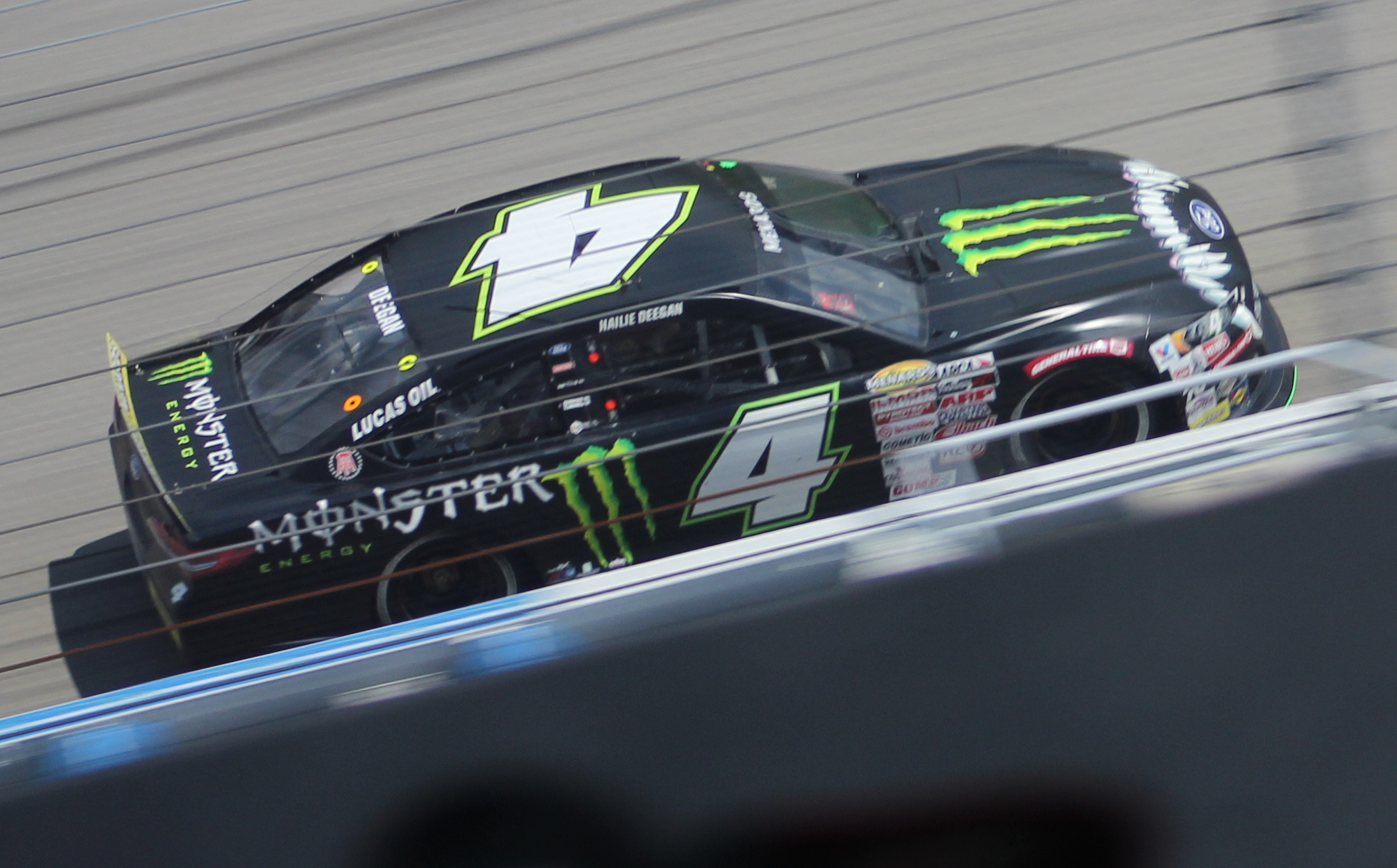
Deegan on track at Michigan in 2020

At the season-opening race at Daytona International Speedway, Deegan ran the fastest lap time in the opening practice session. Despite a mid-race incident with Chuck Hiers, she would go on to finish second in the race behind Michael Self, tying Robinson and Erin Crocker for best ARCA finish by a woman. She followed with three consecutive seventh-place finishes before finishing third at Lucas Oil Raceway, tying the series record for best finish by a woman on a short track. Deegan would not score another top-five finish until Lebanon I-44 Speedway, where she finished fifth after being involved in multiple incidents throughout the night, including spinning out on the last lap after contact with Ty Gibbs.

By mid-September, Deegan had expressed frustration with ARCA's limited practice and lack of live pit stops due to the COVID-19 pandemic, saying it "favors the drivers who have been there forever" and makes it more difficult to attract sponsorship. She also called the quality of the racing in ARCA "boring" due to the field being spread out, arguing, "I think [what] we've been lacking a lot in the ARCA Series [is] good racing." She tied her career-best ARCA finish with a second-place run at the Illinois State Fairgrounds Racetrack, the series' only dirt race of the season. At the conclusion of the season, Deegan finished third in the point standings and claimed the series' Rookie of the Year award.

On October 7, 2020, DGR-Crosley announced that Deegan would make her NASCAR Gander RV & Outdoors Truck Series debut in the team's No. 17 Ford at Kansas. She finished one lap down in 16th, the best result in Truck Series history for a woman in a series debut.

==== 2021: Full-time in Truck Series ====
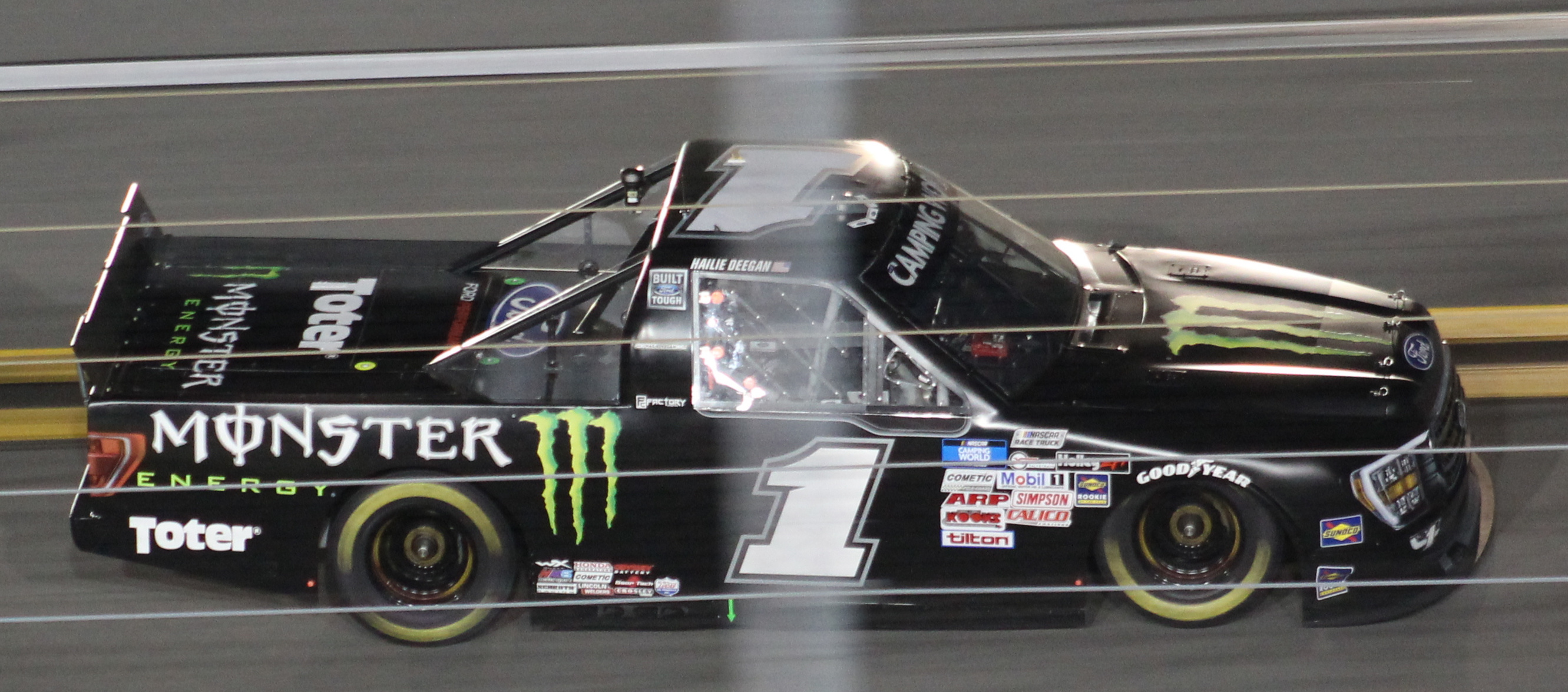
Deegan in the No. 1 truck at Daytona International Speedway in 2021

On October 17, 2020, Ford Performance announced that Deegan was in line to drive full-time in the 2021 NASCAR Camping World Truck Series for DGR-Crosley, which was renamed David Gilliland Racing in January. Deegan's truck number, No. 1, was revealed on January 18, 2021.

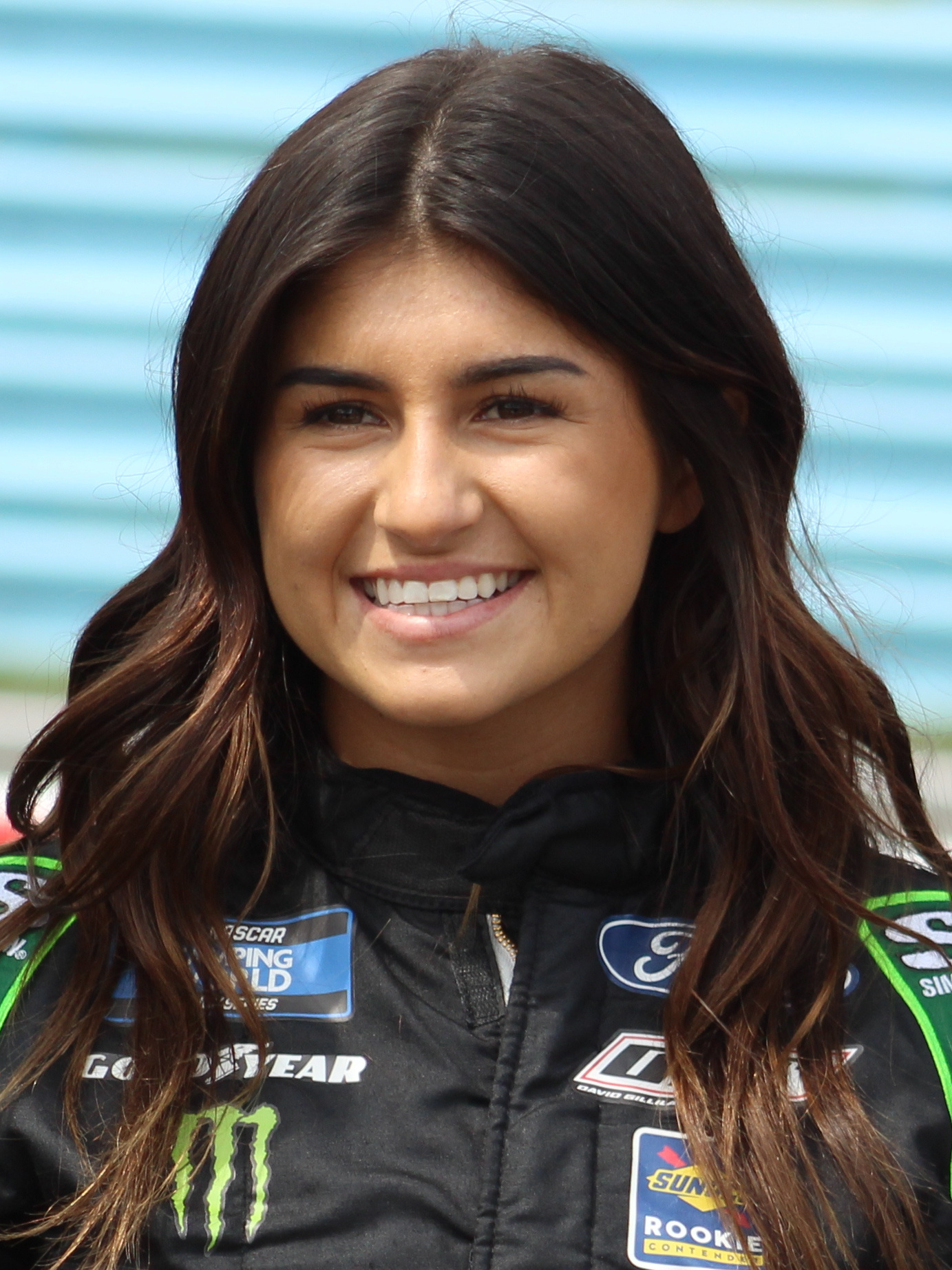
Deegan at Watkins Glen in 2021.

In August, she finished seventh at World Wide Technology Raceway at Gateway. Besides being her first Truck Series career top ten, she became the first woman in series history to score such a finish outside of a superspeedway.

She ended the season with the Gateway top-ten and a seventeenth place points finish. Due to many races not having practice and qualifying as part of COVID-19 pandemic restrictions, Deegan regarded her rookie season as a "learning experience" in growing accustomed to life in the Truck Series. She also regarded her social media presence as a boon in her racing development as her popularity provided patience among sponsors. She was voted the 2021 Truck Series Most Popular Driver, marking the second straight season that a rookie received the award after Zane Smith did so in 2020.

==== 2022: Xfinity Series debut ====
On October 4, 2022, Deegan announced she would make her NASCAR Xfinity Series debut in the SS-Green Light Racing No. 07 at Las Vegas. She finished on the lead lap in thirteenth, the best result in Xfinity Series history for a woman in a series debut.

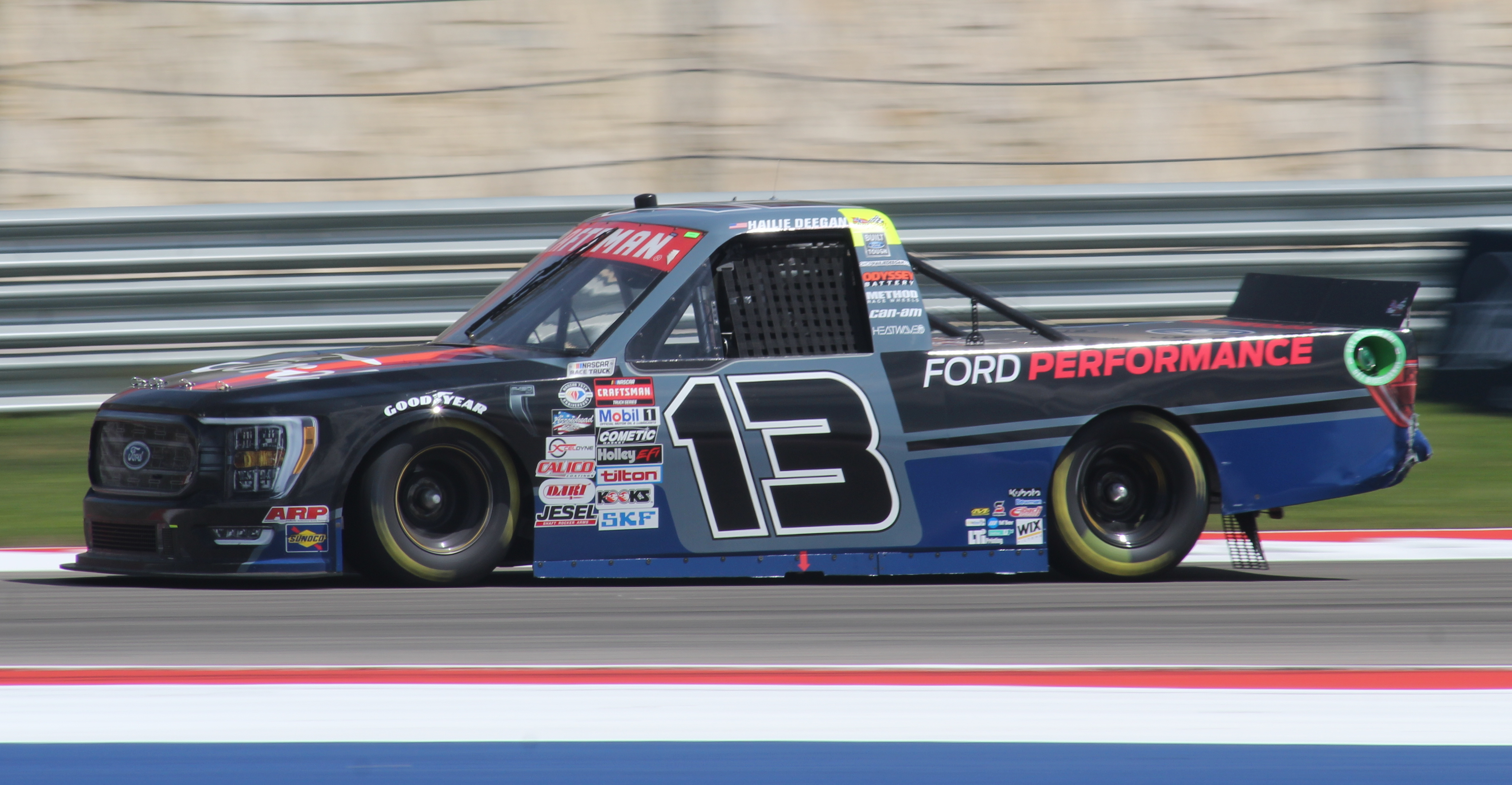
Deegan in the No. 13 truck at the Circuit of the Americas in 2023

==== 2024: Part-time in Xfinity Series ====
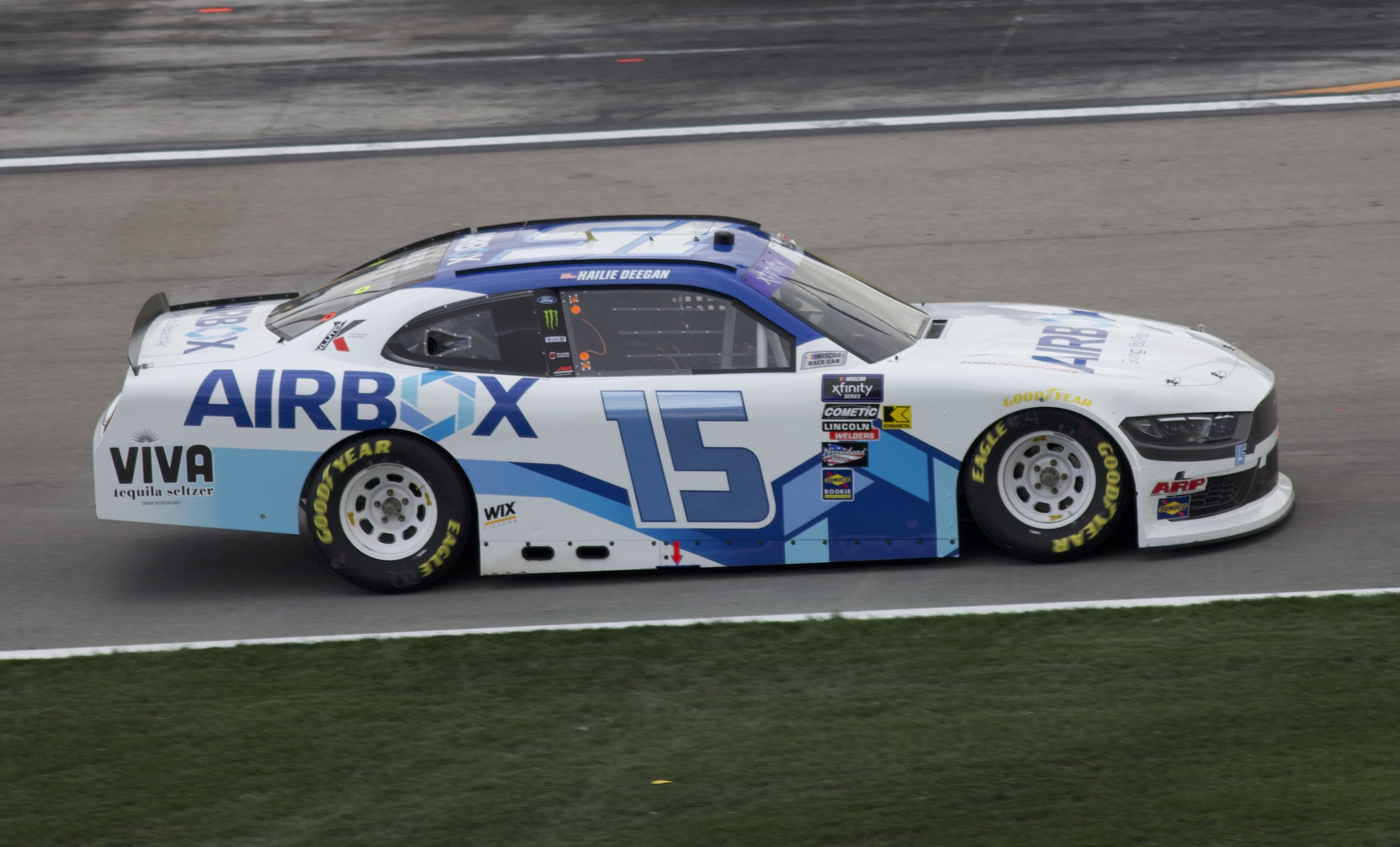
Deegan's No. 15 car at Las Vegas Motor Speedway in 2024.

On October 5, 2023, Deegan signed a multi-year deal with AM Racing to drive the No. 15 starting in 2024. Following a string of disappointing finishes, AM Racing replaced Deegan with two-time Cup Series champion Joey Logano for the Chicago street race. The team struggled throughout the season, only scoring four finishes of twentieth or better through seventeen races, with a best finish of twelfth at Talladega. On July 8, AM Racing and Deegan officially announced that they would part ways.

==== 2026–present: Return to stock cars ====
Deegan's race winning No. 16 car at Madera Speedway in 2026

On January 21, 2026, Deegan announced she would be returning full-time to the ARCA Menards Series West for the 2026 season with Bill McAnally Racing. While Deegan hinted at potentially also making a few part-time starts in the NASCAR Craftsman Truck Series for McAnally–Hilgemann Racing, she ultimately made zero starts in the Truck Series that year. Deegan's season was highlighted by scoring two race wins, first earning her fourth career victory at Madera. Again, it came after contact on the final lap, this time with points leader Trevor Huddleston. Deegan then won the rain-shortened event season finale at Kevin Harvick's Kern Raceway, collecting her fifth career victory.

On November 13, team owner Bill McAnally confirmed Deegan would return to the ARCA Menards Series West for the 2027 season and again mentioned the possibility of her making a few Truck Series starts in preparation for a full-time Truck Series schedule in 2028.

=== IMSA ===
Deegan's move to Ford in 2020 included a foray into the IMSA Michelin Pilot Challenge with Multimatic Motorsports. She ran the 2020 series season-opener at Daytona with co-driver Chase Briscoe. Deegan and Briscoe finished 43rd out of 51 cars. The pair's No. 22 Ford GT4 ran as high as fifteenth but developed mechanical problems about three hours into the four-hour event. Deegan returned to the series at Laguna Seca, teaming up in the No. 22 Ford with Sebastian Priaulx.

In 2022, she returned to the Michelin Pilot Challenge at Daytona, once again sharing a car with Briscoe. The pair placed 24th in the field of 48.

=== Superstar Racing Experience ===
In 2021, Deegan joined the newly formed Superstar Racing Experience. She finished second to Tony Stewart in her first race at Knoxville Raceway, which was followed by starts at Slinger Speedway and Nashville Fairgrounds Speedway as a replacement for Tony Kanaan. The Slinger race was highlighted by a feud with Paul Tracy in which the two spun each other before arguing on Instagram.

She returned to SRX in 2022 for the Stafford Motor Speedway and I-55 Raceway rounds.

=== Indy NXT ===
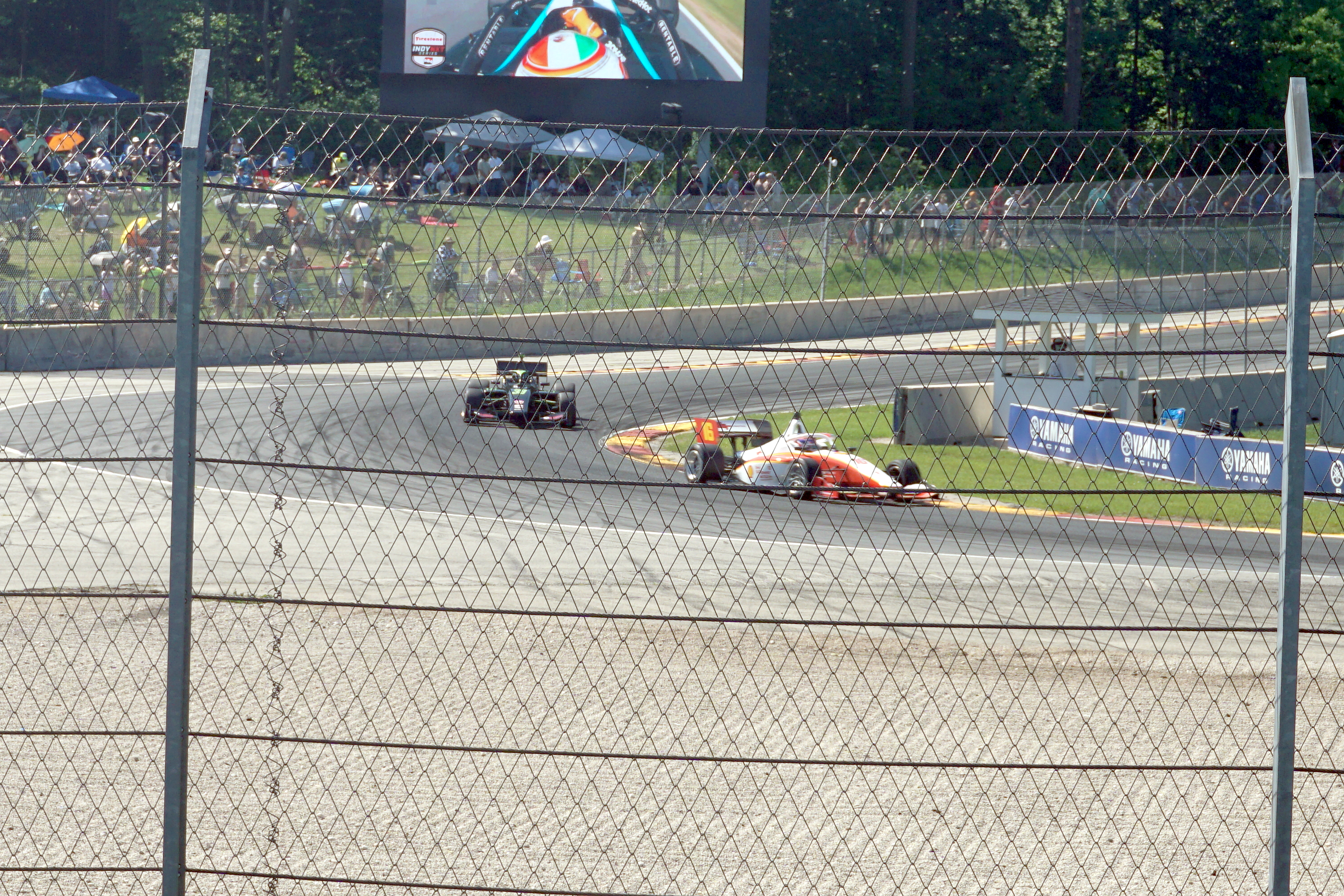
Deegan (behind) chasing Tommy Smith at Road America in 2025.

On October 14, 2024, it was announced Deegan would race in the Indy NXT series in the No. 38 HMD Motorsports car for the 2025 season. She finished 14th in her series debut at the St. Petersburg street circuit. Deegan ended the season 14th in the championship standings with a season best of 11th place at Laguna Seca before returning to stock car racing in 2026.

== Driving style ==
Known for her aggressive on-track moves, all three of Deegan's wins in the K&N Pro Series West came after making contact with another car, while her last one saw her spin out her teammate entirely. Racer's Kelly Crandall wrote in 2019, "Deegan doesn't care what anyone on or off the track thinks, and she has repeatedly made it clear she's here to win races, will do so at any cost, and then climb out and tell you all about it. Deegan has embraced her reputation as an aggressive driver, attributing it to her family's roots in motocross.

At Roseville in 2018, one week after scoring her first career victory on a bump-and-run pass, Deegan was penalized one lap late in the race for contact with Trevor Huddleston. In 2019, driving in her ARCA debut at Toledo, Deegan finished last after contact with Joe Graf Jr. and declared she was "done playing nice." Deegan's rough driving in the K&N West race at Gateway led to an argument with series veteran Todd Souza. Souza stated that her on-track behavior was "full-on disrespect" and was quoted as saying Deegan "drives like she's a spoiled rotten little baby."

In the 2020 season-opening ARCA race at Daytona, Deegan's aggressive bump drafting nearly spun teammate Tanner Gray into the tri-oval. Despite her spotter, Eric Holmes, encouraging her to relax the aggression, Deegan later sent Chuck Hiers into the wall coming off of turn 2, leading Autoweek's Matt Weaver to write, "Such drafting tactics are generally disapproved of at Daytona and Talladega, and that's something she will have to learn." Later that season at Lebanon I-44 Speedway, series officials gave Deegan a warning for her rough driving after she spun out two cars within the first 70 laps of the race. The second incident involved owner-driver Bret Holmes, who was spun as he and Deegan battled for the lead. Holmes said after the race, "Some drivers just don't understand what it's like to run your own team and have to pay for their own stuff, so they just...knock people out of the way every time they have to take the lead."

== Personal life ==
Deegan is the daughter of Brian Deegan, founder of Metal Mulisha, a motocross rider, freestyle motocross, off-road racer, and multi-time X Games gold medalist. Her younger brother Haiden Deegan is a professional AMA supercross and motocross racer, and was the 2023 AMA SMX 250 champion. Her youngest brother Hudson has also competed in motocross. Deegan is in a relationship with dirt track racer and former NASCAR driver Chase Cabre. Cabre served as her co-driver in the 2022 Mint 400. On October 27, 2023, Deegan announced her engagement to Cabre in an Instagram post.

She attended Rancho Christian High School in her hometown of Temecula, California. Deegan currently splits time between her two residences in California and Mooresville, North Carolina.

At the 2020 Daytona 500, Deegan expressed interest in meeting President Donald Trump, tweeting the morning of the race, "Today's goal. Get my helmet signed by Trump." Trump's son, Donald Trump Jr., also attended the race and connected Deegan with President Trump, leading him to sign Deegan's helmet and pose for pictures with her.

In September 2020, Deegan was criticized when comments surfaced from an audio podcast in which she called the COVID-19 pandemic a "hoax." In January 2021, she attracted criticism for calling another player a "retard" during an iRacing livestream on her Twitch channel. Deegan subsequently apologized after video of the incident was posted to social media. The next day, NASCAR announced that Deegan would be required to take sensitivity training prior to the start of the 2021 season.

== Motorsports career results ==
=== Career summary ===
==== Off-road ====
Season	Series	Races	Wins	Podiums	Position	Points	Ref
2009	SXS Stadium Junior Kart Stock	2	1	2	5th	122	
2009	LOORRS Junior 1 Karts	2	0	0	33rd	20	
2010	LOORRS Junior 1 Karts	6	0	0	20th	238	
2010	LOORRS Junior 2 Karts	5	0	0	15th	180	
2011	LOORRS Junior 2 Karts	15	0	0	11th	406	
2011	LOORRS Regional Junior 2 Karts (SoCal)	4	0	2	4th	177	
2012	LOORRS Junior 2 Karts	15	1	1	8th	536	
2013	LOORRS Junior 2 Karts	11	3	6	**1st**	504	
2013	LOORRS Modified Karts	14	0	0	17th	334	
2014	LOORRS Modified Karts	15	1	1	13th	424	
2015	LOORRS Modified Karts	14	0	4	9th	440	
2016	LOORRS Modified Karts	13	4	10	**1st**	622	
2017	LOORRS Pro Lite	13	0	3	6th	499	
2018	LOORRS Pro Lite	3	0	0	17th	126	
2019	LOORRS Pro Lite	3	0	0	16th	126	

==== Asphalt ====
Season	Series	Team	Car No.	Races	Wins	Top fives	Top tens	Poles	Laps led	Position	Points	Ref
2017	CARS Super Late Model Tour	Bond Suss Racing	55	2	0	0	0	0	0	N/A	N/A	
2018	NASCAR K&N Pro Series East	Bill McAnally Racing	19	6	0	0	0	0	3	20th	142	
2018	NASCAR K&N Pro Series West	Bill McAnally Racing	19	14	1	5	12	2	40	5th	514	
2019	NASCAR K&N Pro Series East	Bill McAnally Racing	19	7	0	0	2	0	6	10th	258	
2019	NASCAR K&N Pro Series East	DGR-Crosley	54	1	0	0	1	0	0	10th	258	
2019	NASCAR K&N Pro Series West	Bill McAnally Racing	19	14	2	8	11	3	67	3rd	539	
2019	ARCA Menards Series	Venturini Motorsports	55	6	0	1	4	0	0	24th	1090	
2020	Michelin Pilot Challenge - GS	Multimatic Motorsports	22	2	0	0	0	0	0	54th	22	
2020	NASCAR Gander RV & Outdoors Truck Series	DGR-Crosley	17	1	0	0	0	0	0	58th	21	
2020	ARCA Menards Series	DGR-Crosley	4	20	0	4	17	0	86	3rd	887	
2020	ARCA Menards Series East	DGR-Crosley	4	2	0	0	2	0	0	25th	76	
2021	NASCAR Camping World Truck Series	David Gilliland Racing	1	22	0	0	1	0	0	17th	360	
2021	SRX Series		1	3	0	2	3	0	0	N/A	N/A	
2022	NASCAR Camping World Truck Series	David Gilliland Racing	1	23	0	0	2	0	0	21st	349	
2022	NASCAR Xfinity Series	SS-Green Light Racing	07	1	0	0	0	0	0	93rd	N/A	
2022	SRX Series		5/38	2	0	0	2	1	0	15th	22	
2023	NASCAR Craftsman Truck Series	ThorSport Racing	13	23	0	0	2	0	0	19th	385	
2023	Michelin Pilot Challenge - GS	PF Racing	41	1	0	1	1	0	?	41st	300	
2023	SRX Series		5	6	0	3	6	1	?	7th	140	
2024	NASCAR Xfinity Series	AM Racing	15	17	0	0	0	0	0	32nd	174	
2024	Formula Regional Americas Championship	Toney Driver Development	38	2	0	0	1	0	?	19th	1	
2025	Indy NXT	HMD Motorsports	38	14	0	0	0	0	0	14th	202	
2026	ARCA Menards Series	Bill McAnally Racing	16	1	0	0	0	0	0	94th	33	
2026	ARCA Menards Series West	Bill McAnally Racing	16	13	2	4	9	0	43	4th	580	

* Season still in progress.

=== NASCAR ===
(key) (Bold – Pole position awarded by qualifying time. Italics – Pole position earned by points standings or practice time. * – Most laps led.)

==== Xfinity Series ====
NASCAR Xfinity Series results
Year	Team	No.	Make	1	2	3	4	5	6	7	8	9	10	11	12	13	14	15	16	17	18	19	20	21	22	23	24	25	26	27	28	29	30	31	32	33	NXSC	Pts	Ref
2022	SS-Green Light Racing	07	Ford	DAY	CAL	LVS	PHO	ATL	COA	RCH	MAR	TAL	DOV	DAR	TEX	CLT	PIR	NSH	ROA	ATL	NHA	POC	IRC	MCH	GLN	DAY	DAR	KAN	BRI	TEX	TAL	ROV	LVS; 13	HOM	MAR	PHO	93rd	0^{1}	
2024	AM Racing	15	Ford	DAY; 37	ATL; 27	LVS; 15	PHO; 33	COA; 23	RCH; 31	MAR; 18	TEX; 23	TAL; 12	DOV; 31	DAR; 36	CLT; 20	PIR; 33	SON; 32	IOW; 25	NHA; 32	NSH; 28	CSC	POC	IND	MCH	DAY	DAR	ATL	GLN	BRI	KAN	TAL	ROV	LVS	HOM	MAR	PHO	32nd	174	

==== Craftsman Truck Series ====
NASCAR Craftsman Truck Series results
Year	Team	No.	Make	1	2	3	4	5	6	7	8	9	10	11	12	13	14	15	16	17	18	19	20	21	22	23	NCTC	Pts	Ref
2020	DGR-Crosley	17	Ford	DAY	LVS	CLT	ATL	HOM	POC	KEN	TEX	KAN	KAN	MCH	DRC	DOV	GTW	DAR	RCH	BRI	LVS	TAL	KAN; 16	TEX	MAR	PHO	58th	21	
2021	David Gilliland Racing	1	Ford	DAY; 24	DRC; 28	LVS; 28	ATL; 21	BRD; 19	RCH; 17	KAN; 13	DAR; 20	COA; 14	CLT; 13	TEX; 24	NSH; 21	POC; 26	KNX; 21	GLN; 19	GTW; 7	DAR; 29	BRI; 25	LVS; 31	TAL; 24	MAR; 19	PHO; 17		17th	360	
2022	David Gilliland Racing	1	Ford	DAY; 17	LVS; 33	ATL; 36	COA; 34	MAR; 19	BRD; 18	DAR; 29	KAN; 17	TEX; 17	CLT; 27	GTW; 15	SON; 32	KNX; 15	NSH; 28	MOH; 10	POC; 33	IRP; 13	RCH; 26	KAN; 22	BRI; 14	TAL; 6	HOM; 17	PHO; 31	21st	349	
2023	ThorSport Racing	13	Ford	DAY; 35	LVS; 32	ATL; 12	COA; 16	TEX; 6	BRD; 13	MAR; 20	KAN; 12	DAR; 20	NWS; 20	CLT; 33	GTW; 32	NSH; 28	MOH; 26	POC; 13	RCH; 15	IRP; 31	MLW; 22	KAN; 30	BRI; 17	TAL; 8	HOM; 28	PHO; 15	19th	385	

^{*} Season still in progress
^{1} Ineligible for series points

=== ARCA Menards Series ===
(key) (Bold – Pole position awarded by qualifying time. Italics – Pole position earned by points standings or practice time. * – Most laps led. ** – All laps led.)

ARCA Menards Series results
Year	Team	No.	Make	1	2	3	4	5	6	7	8	9	10	11	12	13	14	15	16	17	18	19	20	AMSC	Pts	Ref
2019	Venturini Motorsports	55	Toyota	DAY	FIF	SLM	TAL	NSH	TOL; 18	CLT	POC; 7	MCH	MAD; 12	GTW	CHI	ELK; 8	IOW	POC	ISF	DSF	SLM	IRP; 5	KAN; 8	24th	1090	
2020	DGR-Crosley	4	Ford	DAY; 2	PHO; 7	TAL; 7	POC; 7	IRP; 3	KEN; 14	IOW; 18	KAN; 9	TOL; 8	TOL; 6	MCH; 6	DRC; 6	GTW; 9	L44; 5*	TOL; 6	BRI; 6	WIN; 12	MEM; 7	ISF; 2	KAN; 6	3rd	887	
2026	Bill McAnally Racing	16	Chevy	DAY	PHO; 11	KAN	TAL	GLN	TOL	MCH	POC	BER	ELK	CHI	LRP	IRP	IOW	ISF	MAD	DSF	SLM	BRI	KAN	94th	33	

==== ARCA Menards Series East ====
ARCA Menards Series East results
Year	Team	No.	Make	1	2	3	4	5	6	7	8	9	10	11	12	13	14	AMSEC	Pts	Ref
2018	Bill McAnally Racing	19	Toyota	NSM; 29	BRI; 22	LGY	SBO	SBO	MEM; 13	NJM	TMP	NHA; 16	IOW; 21	GLN	GTW; 23	NHA	DOV	20th	142	
2019	Bill McAnally Racing	19	Toyota	NSM; 16	BRI; 16	SBO; 10	SBO; 12	MEM	NHA; 11	IOW; 12	GLN		GTW; 9	NHA	DOV			10th	258	
2019	DGR-Crosley	54	Toyota									BRI; 9						10th	258	
2020	DGR-Crosley	4	Ford	NSM	TOL	DOV	TOL; 6	BRI; 6	FIF									25th	76	

==== ARCA Menards Series West ====
ARCA Menards Series West results
Year	Team	No.	Make	1	2	3	4	5	6	7	8	9	10	11	12	13	14	AMSWC	Pts	Ref
2018	Bill McAnally Racing	19	Toyota	KCR; 7	TUS; 8	TUS; 8	OSS; 4	CNS; 5	SON; 7	DCS; 2	IOW; 21	EVG; 7	GTW; 23	**LVS**; 2	MER; 1	AAS; 7	**KCR**; 6	5th	514	
2019	Bill McAnally Racing	19	Toyota	LVS; 1	**IRW**; 5	TUS; 3	TUS; 15	CNS; 1*	**SON**; 8	DCS; 3	IOW; 12	EVG; 7	GTW; 9	MER; 13	**AAS**; 2	KCR; 3	PHO; 4	3rd	539	
2026	Bill McAnally Racing	16	Chevy	KCR; 6	PHO; 11	TUC; 7	SHA; 7	CNS; 7	TRI; 14	SON; 20	PIR; 3	AAS; 3	MAD; 1	LVS; 16	PHO; 6	KCR; 1**		4th	628	

=== Superstar Racing Experience ===
(key) * – Most laps led. ^{1} – Heat 1 winner. ^{2} – Heat 2 winner.

Superstar Racing Experience results
Year	No.	1	2	3	4	5	6	SRXC	Pts
2021	1	STA	KNX; 2	ELD	IRP	SLG; 4	NSV; 10	6th	162
2022	5	FIF	SBO	STA; 6	NSV			16th	22
2022	38					I55; 9	SHA	16th	22
2023	5	STA; 5	STA II; 8	MMS; 8	BER; 5	ELD; 2	LOS; 10	7th	140

^{*} SRX combined points from Deegan and Tony Kanaan in 2021.

=== CARS Super Late Model Tour ===
(key)

CARS Super Late Model Tour results
Year	Team	No.	Make	1	2	3	4	5	6	7	8	9	10	11	12	13	CSLMTC	Pts	Ref
2017	Bond Suss	55	Toyota	CON	DOM	DOM	HCY	HCY	BRI	AND	ROU	TCM; 11	ROU	HCY; 14	CON	SBO	29th	41	

=== American open–wheel racing results ===
==== Formula Regional Americas Championship ====
(key) (Races in bold indicate pole position) (Races in italics indicate fastest lap)

Year	Team	1	2	3	4	5	6	7	8	9	10	11	12	13	14	15	16	17	18	19	20	21	DC	Points
2024	Toney Driver Development	NOL; 1	NOL; 2	NOL; 3	LAG; 1	LAG; 2	ROA; 1	ROA; 2	ROA; 3	IMS; 1	IMS; 2	IMS; 3	MOH; 1	MOH; 2	NJM; 1	NJM; 2	NJM; 3	MOS; 1	MOS; 2	MOS; 3	COT; 1; 11	COT; 2; 10	19th	1

==== Indy NXT ====
(key) (Races in bold indicate pole position) (Races in italics indicate fastest lap) (Races with ^{L} indicate a race lap led) (Races with * indicate most race laps led)

Year	Team	1	2	3	4	5	6	7	8	9	10	11	12	13	14	Rank	Points
2025	HMD Motorsports	STP; 14	BAR; 17	IMS; 17	IMS; 18	DET; 16	GTW; 16	ROA; 18	MOH; 17	IOW; 18	LAG; 12	LAG; 11	POR; 17	MIL; 14	NSH; 13	14th	202
