= Cole Williams (racing driver) =

American racing driver (born 1996)

- Born: February 19, 1996 (age 30); Sellersburg, Indiana, U.S.

ARCA Menards Series career
- 3 races run over 2 years
- Best finish: 77th (2021)
- First race: 2016 Music City 200 (Nashville)
- Last race: 2021 Herr's Potato Chips 200 (Toledo)
Wins	Top tens	Poles
0	1	0
- Statistics up to date as of January 29, 2025.

Cole Williams (born February 19, 1996) is an American professional stock car racing driver who has previously competed in the ARCA Menards Series, the CRA JEGS All-Stars Tour, and the now defunct SRX Series.

Williams has also competed in series such as the ASA CRA Super Series, the NASCAR Advance Auto Parts Weekly Series, the ASA Southern Super Series, and the CARS Super Late Model Tour.

== Motorsports results ==
=== ARCA Menards Series ===
(key) (Bold – Pole position awarded by qualifying time. Italics – Pole position earned by points standings or practice time. * – Most laps led.)

ARCA Menards Series results
Year	Team	No.	Make	1	2	3	4	5	6	7	8	9	10	11	12	13	14	15	16	17	18	19	20	AMSC	Pts	Ref
2016	Venturini Motorsports	55	Toyota	DAY	NSH; 25	SLM	TAL																	82nd	255	
2016	Venturini Motorsports	15	Toyota					TOL; 16	NJE	POC	MCH	MAD	WIN	IOW	IRP	POC	BLN	ISF	DSF	SLM	CHI	KEN	KAN	82nd	255	
2021	Rette Jones Racing	30	Ford	DAY	PHO	TAL	KAN	TOL; 6	CLT	MOH	POC	ELK	BLN	IOW	WIN	GLN	MCH	ISF	MLW	DSF	BRI	SLM	KAN	77th	38	

=== Superstar Racing Experience ===
(key) * – Most laps led. ^{1} – Heat 1 winner. ^{2} – Heat 2 winner.

Superstar Racing Experience results
Year	No.	1	2	3	4	5	6	SRXC	Pts
2022	46	FIF	SBO	STA	NSV; 12^{2}	I55	SHA	17th	15

=== CARS Super Late Model Tour ===
(key)

CARS Super Late Model Tour results
Year	Team	No.	Make	1	2	3	4	5	6	7	8	9	CSLMTC	Pts	Ref
2018	N/A	46	Ford	MYB	NSH; 27	ROU	HCY	BRI	AND	HCY	ROU	SBO	N/A	0	
2019	N/A	46	Chevy	SNM	HCY	NSH; 14	MMS	BRI	HCY	ROU	SBO		N/A	0	

=== CARS Pro Late Model Tour ===
(key)

CARS Pro Late Model Tour results
Year	Team	No.	Make	1	2	3	4	5	6	7	8	9	10	11	CPLMTC	Pts	Ref
2026	William Brooks Racing	46	N/A	SNM	NSV; 32	CRW	ACE	NWS	HCY	AND	FLC	TCM	NPS	SBO	83rd	10	
