= 2021 Herr's Potato Chips 200 =

Race details
- Race 5 of 20 of the 2021 ARCA Menards Series
- Date: May 22, 2021
- Official name: Herr's Potato Chips 200
- Location: Toledo, Ohio, Toledo Speedway
- Course: Permanent racing facility
- Course length: 0.804 km (0.5 miles)
- Distance: 200 laps, 100 mi (160.934 km)
- Scheduled distance: 200 laps, 100 mi (160.934 km)
- Average speed: 78.142 miles per hour (125.757 km/h)

Pole position
Driver	Ty Gibbs	Joe Gibbs Racing
- Time: 15.979

Most laps led
Driver	Ty Gibbs	Joe Gibbs Racing
- Laps: 153

Winner
No. 18	Ty Gibbs	Joe Gibbs Racing

Television in the United States
- Network: MAVTV
- Announcers: Bob Dillner, Jim Trebow

Radio in the United States
- Radio: ARCA Racing

The 2021 Herr's Potato Chips 200 was the fifth stock car race of the 2021 ARCA Menards Series season and the first race of the 2021 Sioux Chief Showdown. The race was held on Saturday, May 22, 2021, in Toledo, Ohio, at Toledo Speedway, a 0.5 miles (0.80 km) permanent oval-shaped racetrack. The race took the scheduled 200 laps to complete. At race's end, Ty Gibbs of Joe Gibbs Racing would dominate the race and win his 11th career ARCA Menards Series win, his third of the season, and his second straight win. To fill out the podium, Corey Heim of Venturini Motorsports and Nick Sanchez of Rev Racing would finish second and third, respectively.

== Background ==
Toledo Speedway opened in 1960 and was paved in 1964. In 1978 it was sold to Thomas "Sonny" Adams Sr. The speedway was reacquired by ARCA in 1999. The track also features the weekly racing divisions of sportsman on the half-mile and Figure 8, factory stock, and four cylinders on a quarter-mile track inside the big track. They also have a series of races with outlaw-bodied late models that includes four 100-lap races and ends with Glass City 200. The track hosts the “Fastest short track show in the world” which features winged sprints and winged Super Modifieds on the half mile. Toledo also used to host a 200-lap late model race until its sale to ARCA in 1999.

Toledo is known for the foam blocks that line the race track, different than the concrete walls that line many short tracks throughout America. The crumbling walls can make track cleanup a tedious task for workers.

=== Entry list ===
#	Driver	Team	Make	Sponsor
01	Owen Smith	Fast Track Racing	Ford	Fast Track Racing
2	Nick Sanchez	Rev Racing	Chevrolet	Universal Technical Institute, NASCAR Technical Institute
10	Dick Doheny	Fast Track Racing	Toyota	Burt Crane & Rigging, Cen-Pe-Co Lubricants, Double "H" Ranch
11	Tony Cosentino	Fast Track Racing	Toyota	The Brews Box
12	D. L. Wilson	Fast Track Racing	Toyota	Evergreen Raceway
15	Jesse Love	Venturini Motorsports	Toyota	Mobil 1
18	Ty Gibbs	Joe Gibbs Racing	Toyota	Joe Gibbs Racing
20	Corey Heim	Venturini Motorsports	Toyota	Craftsman
25	Gracie Trotter	Venturini Motorsports	Toyota	Calico Coatings
27	Alex Clubb	Richmond Clubb Motorsports	Ford	Richmond Clubb Motorsports
30	Cole Williams	Rette Jones Racing	Ford	Slick Products, JRI Shocks
40	A. J. Moyer	Wayne Peterson Racing	Ford	J. R. C. Transportation
46	Thad Moffitt	David Gilliland Racing	Ford	Clean Harbors
48	Brad Smith	Brad Smith Motorsports	Chevrolet	Henshaw Automation
Official entry list

== Practice ==
=== First and final practice ===
The only practice session would take place on Saturday, May 22, at 4:15 PM EST. Corey Heim of Venturini Motorsports would set the fastest time in the session with a lap of 16.109 and an average speed of 111.739 miles per hour (179.826 km/h).

Pos.	#	Driver	Team	Make	Time	Speed
1	20	Corey Heim	Venturini Motorsports	Toyota	16.109	111.739
2	18	Ty Gibbs	Joe Gibbs Racing	Toyota	16.200	111.111
3	2	Nick Sanchez	Rev Racing	Chevrolet	16.296	110.457
Full practice results

== Qualifying ==
Qualifying would take place on Saturday, May 22, at 6:00 PM EST. Ty Gibbs of Joe Gibbs Racing would win the pole with a lap of 15.979 and an average speed of 112.648 miles per hour (181.289 km/h).

Pos.	#	Driver	Team	Make	Time	Speed
1	18	Ty Gibbs	Joe Gibbs Racing	Toyota	15.979	112.648
2	20	Corey Heim	Venturini Motorsports	Toyota	16.086	111.899
3	15	Jesse Love	Venturini Motorsports	Toyota	16.173	111.297
4	2	Nick Sanchez	Rev Racing	Chevrolet	16.179	111.255
5	46	Thad Moffitt	David Gilliland Racing	Ford	16.209	111.049
6	25	Gracie Trotter	Venturini Motorsports	Toyota	16.243	110.817
7	30	Cole Williams	Rette Jones Racing	Ford	16.514	108.998
8	10	Dick Doheny	Fast Track Racing	Toyota	17.915	100.474
9	27	Alex Clubb	Richmond Clubb Motorsports	Ford	18.014	99.922
10	48	Brad Smith	Brad Smith Motorsports	Chevrolet	17.853	100.823
11	11	Tony Cosentino	Fast Track Racing	Toyota	17.936	100.357
12	12	D. L. Wilson	Fast Track Racing	Toyota	18.037	99.795
13	01	Owen Smith	Fast Track Racing	Ford	18.396	97.847
14	40	A. J. Moyer	Wayne Peterson Racing	Ford	18.718	96.164
Official qualifying results

== Race results ==
Fin	St	#	Driver	Team	Make	Laps	Led	Status	Pts
1	1	18	Ty Gibbs	Joe Gibbs Racing	Toyota	200	153	running	49
2	2	20	Corey Heim	Venturini Motorsports	Toyota	200	47	running	43
3	4	2	Nick Sanchez	Rev Racing	Chevrolet	200	0	running	41
4	3	15	Jesse Love	Venturini Motorsports	Toyota	200	0	running	40
5	5	46	Thad Moffitt	David Gilliland Racing	Ford	200	0	running	39
6	7	30	Cole Williams	Rette Jones Racing	Ford	199	0	running	38
7	6	25	Gracie Trotter	Venturini Motorsports	Toyota	199	0	running	37
8	9	27	Alex Clubb	Richmond Clubb Motorsports	Ford	186	0	running	36
9	14	40	A. J. Moyer	Wayne Peterson Racing	Ford	185	0	running	35
10	8	10	Dick Doheny	Fast Track Racing	Toyota	184	0	running	34
11	10	48	Brad Smith	Brad Smith Motorsports	Chevrolet	135	0	handling	33
12	12	12	D. L. Wilson	Fast Track Racing	Toyota	24	0	overheating	32
13	11	11	Tony Cosentino	Fast Track Racing	Toyota	11	0	handling	31
14	13	01	Owen Smith	Fast Track Racing	Ford	10	0	overheating	30
Official race results

Previous race: 2021 Dutch Boy 150	ARCA Menards Series; 2021 season	Next race: 2021 General Tire 150 (Charlotte)
