= Scott Bloomquist =

American racing driver (1963–2024)

- Bloomquist in 2018
- Born: Scott Dean Bloomquist; November 14, 1963; Fort Dodge, Iowa, U.S.
- Died: August 16, 2024 (aged 60); Mooresburg, Tennessee, U.S.
- Cause of death: Suicide by aircraft
- Achievements: All-Time Wins Leader in the Lucas Oil Late Model Dirt Series (94); 2004 World of Outlaws Late Model Series Champion; 2009, 2010, 2016 Lucas Oil Late Model Dirt Series Champion; 1994, 1995, 1998, 2000 Hav-A-Tampa Dirt Late Model Series Champion; 1995, 2002, 2004, 2006, 2008, 2013, 2015, 2017, 2018 Dirt Late Model Dream Winner; 1988, 1990, 2001, 2014 World 100 Winner; 1992, 1994, 1996, 2014 Blue-Gray 100 Winner
- Awards: 2002 National Dirt Late Model Hall of Fame; 2006 RPM Racing News Driver of the Year

NASCAR FedEx Freight Truck Series career
- 1 race run over 1 year
- 2013 position: 69th
- Best finish: 69th (2013)
- First race: 2013 Mudsummer Classic (Eldora)
Wins	Top tens	Poles
0	0	0

ARCA Menards Series career
- 3 races run over 1 year
- Best finish: 69th (1991)
- First race: 1991 Michigan ARCA 200 (Michigan)
- Last race: 1991 Motorcraft Fast Lube ARCA 500K (Atlanta)
Wins	Top tens	Poles
0	0	0

Lucas Oil Late Model Dirt Series career
- Debut season: 2004
- Starts: 502
- Wins: 94
- Poles: 65
- Best finish: 1st in 2009, 2010, 2016

World of Outlaws Late Model Series career
- Debut season: 1989
- Starts: 247
- Wins: 33
- Poles: 8
- Best finish: 1st in 2004

Scott Dean Bloomquist (November 14, 1963 – August 16, 2024) was a nationally touring dirt super late model race car driver in the United States. Bloomquist was born in Fort Dodge, Iowa. He was the owner of dirt late model chassis manufacturer Team Zero Race Cars.

Bloomquist died in a plane crash on August 16, 2024.

== Racing career ==
Bloomquist was the son of an airplane pilot for Air Cal. While stationed in California, Bloomquist's father was invited to see his coworker race a stock car. The elder Bloomquist thought he should give racing a try, so he bought a race car, a motor, and some old tires. He tried racing, and decided to give the race car to his son, Scott. Scott Bloomquist's first race was at Corona Raceway in Corona, California, in August 1980. He won several races and the track championship in 1982.

In 1983, Bloomquist heard about a $4,000-to-win race at the speedway in Chula Vista, California. He saw a picture of a flat-wedge-shaped race car that Charlie Swartz had used to win the Dirt Track World Championship in 1982 and decided to build a race car like it for the Chula Vista race. Bloomquist won the race, lapping the field twice in the process.

After the race, Bloomquist's father wanted to sell the car, since it was worth a lot of money. The two reached an agreement where the father would gradually be paid for the car if the newly graduated Scott Bloomquist would work at his father's new farm, across the country in Tennessee. He traded his 1957 Chevy for a truck and race hauler. After arriving in Tennessee, he crashed the car in qualifying at Newport Speedway. He worked for his father until he had enough money to repair the car. He won some races, earning just enough money to continue racing.

The next year, Bloomquist decided to race with a new car at the Kingsport, Tennessee, Speedway, which had begun hosting a $2,500-to-win event every Saturday night. "I come rolling into the race with my dad and there sits Larry Moore," Bloomquist said. "He was the fastest guy in dirt late model racing and there he sits. And my dad says, 'Well, there goes that $2,500.'" Bloomquist qualified second-fastest behind Moore and started out on Moore's outside in the first row.

Bloomquist used the winnings to improve his race car. He continued working on his father's farm to pay off his original race car. He began attending races with $2,000 purses that were held 100 miles (160 km) from his home.

In 1988, Bloomquist raced at Eldora Speedway's World 100 against three-time winner and favorite Jeff Purvis. After qualifying for the feature, which is unusual for a rookie, he started seventh. Purvis took the lead early in the race. Bloomquist slowly caught Purvis and passed him for the win. Some people considered his win a fluke until Bloomquist took the pole position the following year and won the race again in 1990.

Bloomquist raced in the Hav-A-Tampa series from 1993 to 1996, winning the national touring series in 1994 and 1995. He led 1996 in points until he lost all of his points for bumping another car under caution. He had 60 wins in the series during that time; the second place driver had 18 wins.

In 1997, with problems both on and off the track, Bloomquist left racing and started reading. He read about the human body and mind. After the time away, he returned to racing a changed person. He took all of his sponsors off the car and used only black and white paint. He changed from his familiar number 18 to number 0. He put the yin yang symbol in the middle of the "0" to represent the balance that he had found in his life. He later raced the number "0" car with a skull and crossbones through the middle of the number.

In 2003, Bloomquist competed full-time in the Xtreme Dirt Car Series, formerly the Hav-A-Tampa Series, and won his fifth championship. In 2004, he raced in the World of Outlaws Late Model Series and won the season championship.

Bloomquist was named the 2006 RPM Racing News driver of the year. That year, he won The Dream ($100,000), Topless 100 ($45,000), Scorcher 100 ($20,000), Racefest ($20,000), Dixie Shootout ($15,000), and the Cedar Lake Nationals ($50,000). He also had nine wins in the Lucas Oil Late Model Dirt Series.

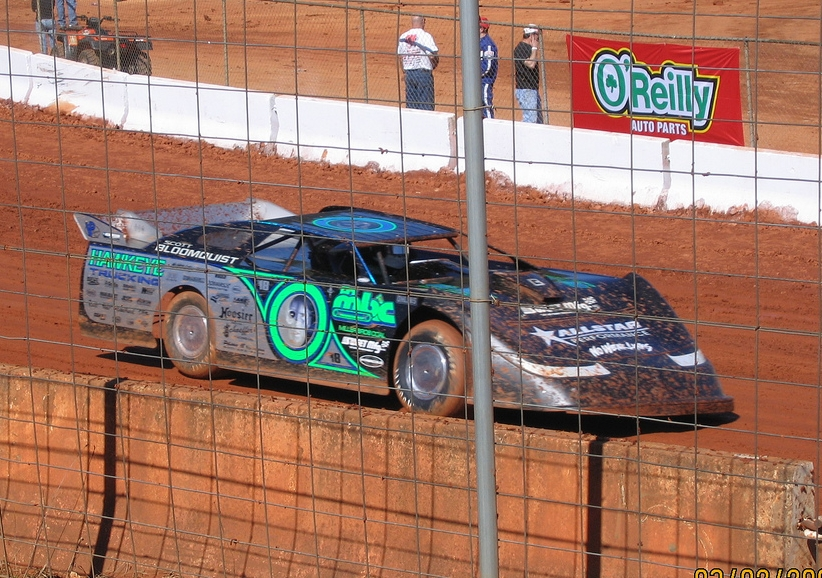
Bloomquist's 2008 race car at Cherokee Speedway

Bloomquist returned to series racing and won the 2009 Lucas Oil Late Model Dirt Series championship. He returned to the series in 2010, defending his points championship. Bloomquist was the series runner-up for 2011, scoring 15 victories. He also scored combined earnings of over $272,000 for the year.

In 2016, Bloomquist was the Lucas Oil Late Model Dirt Series champion. His 2019 season was delayed after injuries sustained in a street crash. He returned to action in June 2019 with teammate Chris Madden and had limited success while recovering from his injuries.

In 2020, Bloomquist teamed with Chris Madden, obtained sponsorship from Drydene, and competed in the World of Outlaws Late Model Series. In 2021, Bloomquist offered his ride to dirt modified standout Nick Hoffman of Mooresville, North Carolina, after lingering medical issues made it impossible for him to continue driving the Team Zero house car. In 2022, Bloomquist drove a very limited schedule due to medical issues (specifically back problems). Scott put his 2023 racing season on hold to undergo back surgery. In 2024, Bloomquist made his return to racing at the Eldora Speedway in the Terry Wolfenbarger–owned Team Zero Chassis. After contact with fellow racer Shannon Babb, Bloomquist crashed into the backstretch wall, causing unrepairable damage to the Team Zero car, and fell short of the opportunity to win his record ninth Dirt Late Model Dream.

In 2002, Bloomquist was in the second induction class of the National Dirt Late Model Hall of Fame in Union, Kentucky.

=== NASCAR ===
In 2013, Bloomquist announced that he would be running in the NASCAR Camping World Truck Series' Mudsummer Classic at Eldora Speedway, driving for Kyle Busch Motorsports. After starting the race in 21st, Bloomquist, who elected to race without a front sway bar, fell to last place after 30 laps and finished in 25th, two laps behind the winner.

== Team Zero Race Cars ==
Team Zero Race Cars
- Type: Private
- Industry: Automotive
- Founded: December 1, 2003; 22 years ago in Mooresburg, Tennessee, U.S.
- Founders: Scott Bloomquist
- Defunct: 2024
- Headquarters: Mooresburg, Tennessee, United States
- Products: Chassis
- Website: www.teamzeroracecars.com

Team Zero Race Cars was a chassis company based out of Mooresburg, Tennessee, founded in 2003 by Scott Bloomquist.

== Personal life ==
Bloomquist had a daughter, Ariel Rouse Bloomquist.

=== Injuries ===
In March 2019, Bloomquist was severely injured in a motorcycle crash in Daytona Beach, Florida, and was hospitalized with extensive leg and hip injuries.

In 2023, Bloomquist was diagnosed with prostate cancer, and previously needed back surgery procedures were put on hold for cancer treatments beginning in July.

=== Legal issues ===
On October 5, 1993, Bloomquist was arrested and charged for possessing 2.7 grams of cocaine. He was found not guilty of felony sale and distribution and guilty of misdemeanor drug possession and possessing drug paraphernalia. He was sentenced in November 1994 to the maximum penalty of a $5,000 fine and one year in prison. It was his first misdemeanor conviction, and he filed an appeal. His sentence was cut in half to six months. He served his time as a work release beginning in 1997.

== Death ==
Bloomquist died on August 16, 2024, at age 60, after his personal vintage airplane, a Piper J-3 Cub, crashed near his home in Mooresburg, Tennessee. NASCAR Cup Series driver Tyler Reddick, whom Bloomquist had mentored early in his career, dedicated his win at Michigan International Speedway the following weekend to Bloomquist.

In June 2025, the NTSB released a report citing that the probable cause of the plane crash was "the intentional flight into a building as an act of suicide". Bloomquist had received flying lessons in his youth, but did not have a pilot's license.

== Motorsports career results ==
=== NASCAR ===
(key) (Bold – Pole position awarded by qualifying time. Italics – Pole position earned by points standings or practice time. * – Most laps led.)

==== Camping World Truck Series ====
NASCAR Camping World Truck Series results
Year	Team	No.	Make	1	2	3	4	5	6	7	8	9	10	11	12	13	14	15	16	17	18	19	20	21	22	NCWTC	Pts	Ref
2013	Kyle Busch Motorsports	51	Toyota	DAY	MAR	CAR	KAN	CLT	DOV	TEX	KEN	IOW	ELD; 25	POC	MCH	BRI	MSP	IOW	CHI	LVS	TAL	MAR	TEX	PHO	HOM	69th	19	

=== ARCA Permatex SuperCar Series ===
(key) (Bold – Pole position awarded by qualifying time. Italics – Pole position earned by points standings or practice time. * – Most laps led.)

ARCA Permatex SuperCar Series results
Year	Team	No.	Make	1	2	3	4	5	6	7	8	9	10	11	12	13	14	15	16	17	18	19	20	APSCSC	Pts	Ref
1991	Bloomquist Racing	18	Olds	DAY	ATL	KIL	TAL	TOL	FRS	POC	MCH	KIL	FRS	DEL	POC	TAL	HPT	MCH; 34	ISF; 26	TOL	DSF	TWS		NA	-	
1991	Cornett Machine	78	Olds																				ATL; 29	NA	-	

=== Superstar Racing Experience ===
(key) * – Most laps led. ^{1} – Heat 1 winner. ^{2} – Heat 2 winner.

Superstar Racing Experience results
Year	No.	1	2	3	4	5	6	SRXC	Pts
2021	00	STA	KNX; 9^{2}	ELD	IRP	SLG	NSV	18th	23
