= 2022 SRX Nashville round =

Race details
- Race 4 of 6 in the 2022 SRX Series
- Date: July 9, 2022
- Official name: SRX Nashville
- Location: Nashville, Tennessee
- Course: Nashville Fairgrounds Speedway; 0.596 mi (0.959 km)
- Grid positions set by heat results

Podium

Television in the United States
- Network: CBS
- Allen Bestwick and Conor Daly

The 2022 SRX race at Nashville was a Superstar Racing Experience race that was held on July 9, 2022. It was contested over TBA laps on the 0.50-mile (0.80 km) oval. It was the 4th race of the 2022 SRX Series season.

== Entry list ==
| # | Driver |
|---|---|
| 1 | Ryan Hunter-Reay |
| 2 | Josef Newgarden |
| 3 | Paul Tracy |
| 5 | Matt Kenseth |
| 06 | Hélio Castroneves |
| 6 | Tony Kanaan |
| 14 | Tony Stewart |
| 15 | Michael Waltrip |
| 18 | Bobby Labonte |
| 39 | Ryan Newman |
| 46 | Cole Williams |
| 69 | Greg Biffle |
| 98 | Marco Andretti |

== Heat races ==
The heat races were held at 8:00 PM EST. The lineups for the 1st heat were determined by random selection. Following the 1st heat, the field is inverted for the 2nd heat. Points are awarded for each position, and the points set the field.

=== Heat Race 1 ===
| Fin. | St | # | Driver | Laps | Points | Status |
|---|---|---|---|---|---|---|
| 1 | | | | | | |
| 2 | | | | | | |
| 3 | | | | | | |
| 4 | | | | | | |
| 5 | | | | | | |
| 6 | | | | | | |
| 7 | | | | | | |
| 8 | | | | | | |
| 9 | | | | | | |
| 10 | | | | | | |
| 11 | | | | | | |
| 12 | | | | | | |
| 13 | | | | | | |
[ Official Heat 1 results]

=== Heat Race 2 ===
| Fin. | St | # | Driver | Laps | Points | Status |
|---|---|---|---|---|---|---|
| 1 | | | | | | |
| 2 | | | | | | |
| 3 | | | | | | |
| 4 | | | | | | |
| 5 | | | | | | |
| 6 | | | | | | |
| 7 | | | | | | |
| 8 | | | | | | |
| 9 | | | | | | |
| 10 | | | | | | |
| 11 | | | | | | |
| 12 | | | | | | |
| 13 | | | | | | |
[ Official Heat 2 results]

=== Starting Lineup ===
| St | # | Driver |
|---|---|---|
| 1 | | |
| 2 | | |
| 3 | | |
| 4 | | |
| 5 | | |
| 6 | | |
| 7 | | |
| 8 | | |
| 9 | | |
| 10 | | |
| 11 | | |
| 12 | | |
| 13 | | |

== Race results ==
=== Main event ===
| Fin. | St | # | Driver | Laps | Led | Points | Status |
|---|---|---|---|---|---|---|---|
| 1 | | | | | | | |
| 2 | | | | | | | |
| 3 | | | | | | | |
| 4 | | | | | | | |
| 5 | | | | | | | |
| 6 | | | | | | | |
| 7 | | | | | | | |
| 8 | | | | | | | |
| 9 | | | | | | | |
| 10 | | | | | | | |
| 11 | | | | | | | |
| 12 | | | | | | | |
| 13 | | | | | | | |
[ Official Main event results]
