= 2022 SRX Stafford round =

Race details
- Race 3 of 6 in the 2022 SRX Series
- Date: July 2, 2022
- Official name: SRX Stafford
- Location: Stafford Springs, Connecticut
- Course: Stafford Motor Speedway; 0.50 mi (0.805 km)
- Distance: 75 laps, 37.50 mi (60.35 km)
- Grid positions set by heat results

Most laps led
- Driver: Marco Andretti
- Laps: 98

Podium
- First: Ryan Newman
- Second: Marco Andretti
- Third: Paul Tracy

Television in the United States
- Network: CBS
- Allen Bestwick and Willy T. Ribbs

The 2022 SRX race at Stafford was a Superstar Racing Experience race that was held on July 2, 2022. It was contested over 75 laps on the 0.50-mile (0.80 km) oval. It was the 3rd race of the 2022 SRX Series season. Ryan Newman took the lead late from Marco Andretti to earn his first SRX series victory.

== Entry list ==
#	Driver
1	Ryan Hunter-Reay
3	Paul Tracy
5	Hailie Deegan
9	Bill Elliott
14	Tony Stewart
15	Michael Waltrip
18	Bobby Labonte
39	Ryan Newman
60	Matt Hirschman
69	Greg Biffle
98	Marco Andretti
99	Justin Marks

== Heat races ==
The heat races were held at 8:00 PM EST. The lineups for the 1st heat were determined by random selection. Following the 1st heat, the field is inverted for the 2nd heat. Points are awarded for each position, and the points set the field.

=== Heat Race 1 ===
Fin.	St	#	Driver	Laps	Points	Status
1	2	1	Ryan Hunter-Reay	28	12	Running
2	1	5	Hailie Deegan	28	11	Running
3	6	69	Greg Biffle	28	10	Running
4	7	98	Marco Andretti	28	9	Running
5	4	60	Matt Hirschman	28	8	Running
6	11	3	Paul Tracy	28	7	Running
7	12	39	Ryan Newman	28	6	Running
8	10	15	Michael Waltrip	28	5	Running
9	9	14	Tony Stewart	28	4	Running
10	5	99	Justin Marks	28	3	Running
11	8	18	Bobby Labonte	28	2	Running
12	3	9	Bill Elliott	28	1	Running
Official Heat 1 results

=== Heat Race 2 ===
Fin.	St	#	Driver	Laps	Points	Status
1	2	18	Bobby Labonte	29	12	Running
2	4	14	Tony Stewart	29	11	Running
3	5	15	Michael Waltrip	29	10	Running
4	7	3	Paul Tracy	29	9	Running
5	9	98	Marco Andretti	29	8	Running
6	6	39	Ryan Newman	29	7	Running
7	10	69	Greg Biffle	29	6	Running
8	1	9	Bill Elliott	29	5	Running
9	8	60	Matt Hirschman	29	4	Running
10	11	5	Hailie Deegan	29	3	Running
11	12	1	Ryan Hunter-Reay	29	2	Running
12	3	99	Justin Marks	29	1	Running
Official Heat 2 results

=== Starting Lineup ===
St	#	Driver
1	98	Marco Andretti
2	69	Greg Biffle
3	13	Paul Tracy
4	15	Michael Waltrip
5	14	Tony Stewart
6	1	Ryan Hunter-Reay
7	5	Hailie Deegan
8	18	Bobby Labonte
9	39	Ryan Newman
10	60	Matt Hirschman
11	9	Bill Elliott
12	99	Justin Marks

== Race results ==
=== Main event ===
Fin.	St	#	Driver	Laps	Led	Points	Status
1	9	39	Ryan Newman	75	6	25	Running
2	1	98	Marco Andretti	75	51	22	Running
3	3	3	Paul Tracy	75	0	20	Running
4	5	14	Tony Stewart	75	18	18	Running
5	8	18	Bobby Labonte	75	0	16	Running
6	7	5	Hailie Deegan	75	0	14	Running
7	6	1	Ryan Hunter-Reay	75	0	12	Running
8	10	60	Matt Hirschman	75	0	10	Running
9	12	99	Justin Marks	75	0	8	Running
10	2	69	Greg Biffle	75	0	6	Running
11	11	9	Bill Elliott	75	0	4	Running
12	4	15	Michael Waltrip	75	0	2	Running
Official Main event results
