= 2022 SRX Series =

Second season of the Superstar Racing Experience

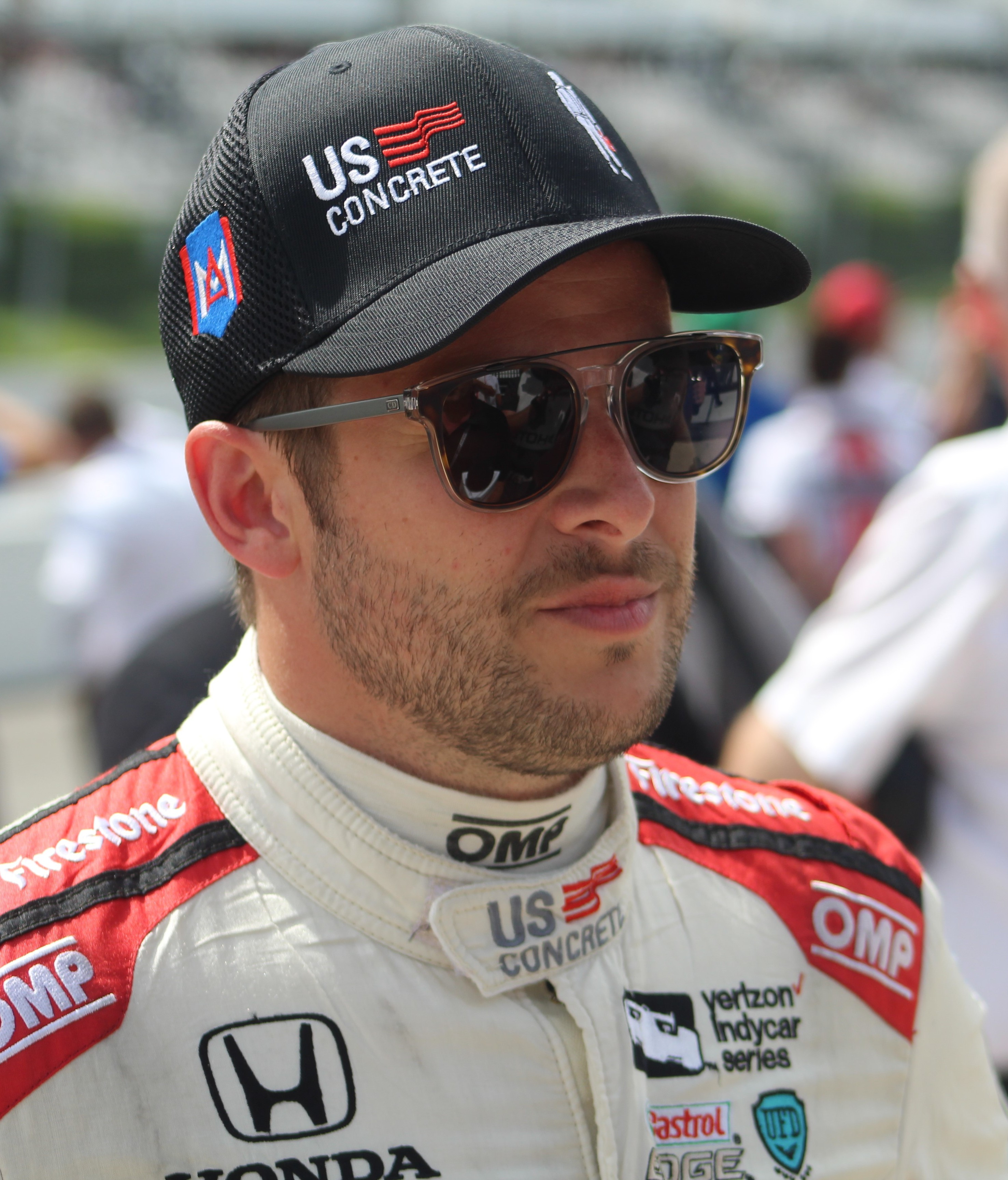
Marco Andretti, the 2022 series champion.

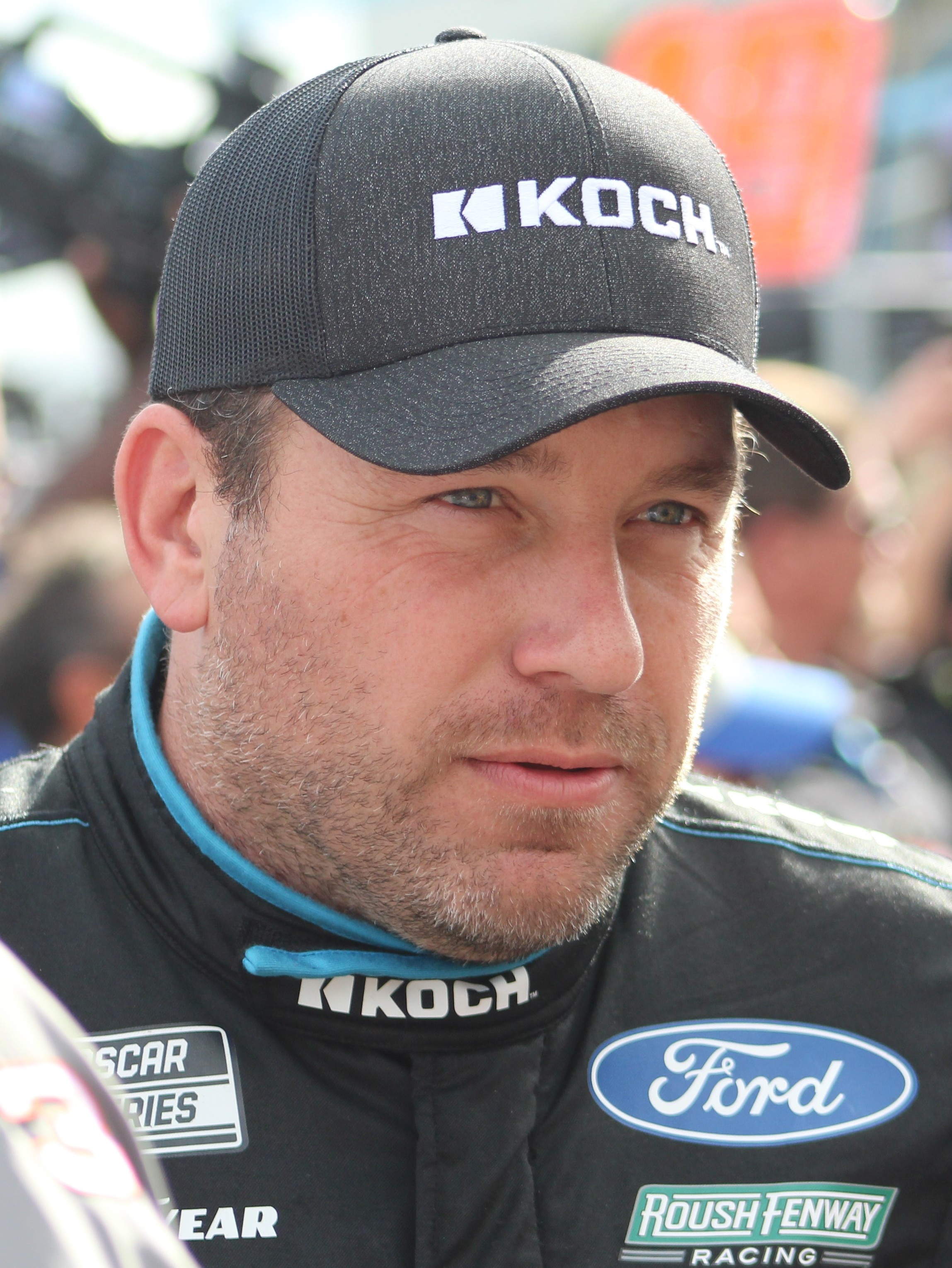
Ryan Newman finished second in the championship.

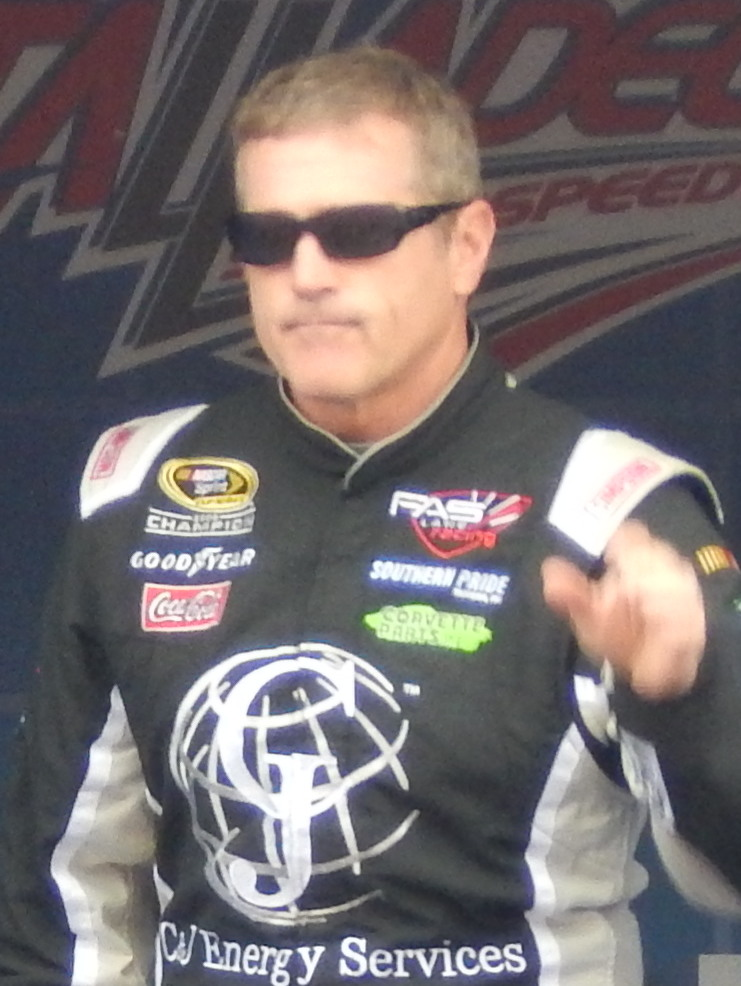
Bobby Labonte finished third in the championship.

The 2022 Camping World SRX Series was the second season of the Superstar Racing Experience. The six-race season began at Five Flags Speedway on June 18 and ended at Sharon Speedway on July 23. Tony Stewart entered the season as the defending series champion, having won the inaugural season in 2021. Marco Andretti won the championship by two points over Ryan Newman despite having no wins on the season.

== Drivers ==
=== Full-time drivers ===
No.	Driver	Primary series	Accomplishments	Ref
1	(United States) Ryan Hunter-Reay	IndyCar Series	2012 IndyCar Series champion 2014 Indianapolis 500 winner	
3	(Canada) Paul Tracy	IndyCar Series	1990 American Racing Series champion 2003 Champ Car World Series champion	
14	(United States) Tony Stewart	NASCAR Cup Series	1996–97 IndyCar Series champion 2002, 2005, and 2011 NASCAR Cup Series champion	
15	(United States) Michael Waltrip	NASCAR Cup Series	1983 NASCAR Darlington Dash Series champion 2001 and 2003 Daytona 500 winner	
18	(United States) Bobby Labonte	NASCAR Cup Series	1991 NASCAR Busch Series champion 2000 NASCAR Cup Series champion	
39	(United States) Ryan Newman	NASCAR Cup Series	26 NASCAR national series wins 2008 Daytona 500 winner	
69	(United States) Greg Biffle	NASCAR Cup Series	56 NASCAR national series wins 2000 NASCAR Truck Series champion 2002 NASCAR Busch Series champion	
98	(United States) Marco Andretti	IndyCar Series	2003 Barber Formula Dodge Eastern class champion 2004 Barber Formula Dodge Barber National class and Southern class champion Two-time IndyCar race winner	

=== Part-time drivers ===
No.	Driver	Primary series	Track	Accomplishments	Ref
06	(Brazil) Hélio Castroneves	IndyCar Series	Five Flags, South Boston, Nashville	2001, 2002, 2009, and 2021 Indianapolis 500 winner 2020 WeatherTech SportsCar Championship champion 2021 and 2022 24 Hours of Daytona winner	
2	(United States) Josef Newgarden	IndyCar Series	Nashville	2017 and 2019 IndyCar Series champion	
5; 99	(United States) Ernie Francis Jr.	Trans-Am Series; Indy Lights	Five Flags, South Boston, I-55	Seven-time consecutive Trans-Am Series champion (2014–2020)	
5; 38	(United States) Hailie Deegan	NASCAR Camping World Truck Series	Stafford, I-55	2020 ARCA Menards Series Rookie of the Year; First female winner in the ARCA Menards Series West	
5	(United States) Matt Kenseth	NASCAR Cup Series	Nashville, I-55, Sharon	2003 NASCAR Cup Series champion 2009 and 2012 Daytona 500 winner	
6	(Brazil) Tony Kanaan	IndyCar Series	Five Flags, South Boston, Nashville, I-55, Sharon	2004 IndyCar Series champion 2013 Indianapolis 500 winner	
9	(United States) Bill Elliott	NASCAR Cup Series	Five Flags, Stafford	1985 and 1987 Daytona 500 winner 1988 NASCAR Cup Series champion 45 NASCAR national series wins	
9	(United States) Chase Elliott	NASCAR Cup Series	Sharon	2020 NASCAR Cup Series champion 2014 NASCAR Nationwide Series champion NASCAR Cup Series Most Popular Driver (2018–2021); 24 NASCAR national series wins	
12	(United States) Ryan Blaney	NASCAR Cup Series	Sharon	18 NASCAR national series wins	
99	(United States) Justin Marks	Rolex Sports Car Series/IMSA; NASCAR	Stafford	8 Rolex Sports Car Series wins 1 IMSA win 1 NASCAR Xfinity Series win 3 wins as a NASCAR Cup Series team owner	

=== Guest drivers ===
No.	Driver	Primary series	Track	Accomplishments	Ref
10	(United States) Dave Blaney	USAC; World of Outlaws; NASCAR Cup Series	Sharon Speedway	1984 USAC champion 1995 World of Outlaws champion 1 NASCAR national series win	
26	(United States) Bubba Pollard	Deep South Crane Blizzard Series	Five Flags Speedway	Best average finish in the PepperJack Kennels Twins on April 8–9	
26	(United States) Peyton Sellers	NASCAR Weekly Series	South Boston Speedway	6 South Boston track championships 2005 and 2021 NASCAR Weekly Series national champion 36 NASCAR Xfinity Series and Camping World Truck Series starts (2006–2015)	
46	(United States) Cole Williams	Late model racing	Nashville Fairgrounds Speedway	Winner of a fan vote among six track regulars (the other drivers in the vote were Dylan Fetcho, Michael House, Stephen Nasse, Bubba Pollard and Brittney Zamora)	
52	(United States) Ken Schrader	NASCAR Cup Series	I-55 Raceway	7 NASCAR national series wins	
60	(United States) Matt Hirschman	NASCAR Whelen Modified Tour	Stafford Motor Speedway	Winner of the Spring Sizzler (April 23–24)	

== Schedule ==
The 2022 schedule was announced on January 31, 2022. It features a return to Stafford Motor Speedway and Nashville Fairgrounds Speedway after visiting those tracks in 2021, along with the addition of four new tracks to the series.

No.	Track	Location	Type	Date	TV	Ratings (Mil)
1	Five Flags Speedway	Pensacola, Florida	0.5 mile, paved	June 18	CBS	0.95
2	South Boston Speedway	South Boston, Virginia	0.4 mile, paved	June 25	CBS	0.98
3	Stafford Motor Speedway	Stafford Springs, Connecticut	0.5 mile, paved	July 2	CBS	0.98
4	Nashville Fairgrounds Speedway	Nashville, Tennessee	0.596 mile, paved	July 9	CBS	0.98
5	I-55 Raceway	Pevely, Missouri	0.333 mile, dirt	July 16	CBS	1.06
6	Sharon Speedway	Hartford Township, Ohio	0.375 mile, dirt	July 23	CBS	1.06

=== Broadcasting ===
All six races were broadcast live in the United States on CBS and Paramount+.

Allen Bestwick returned as the play-by-play announcer, Lindsay Czarniak returned as the host, and Matt Yocum returned as a pit reporter. After competing in the series as a driver in 2021, Willy T. Ribbs joined the SRX broadcast team in 2022 as the roving reporter, replacing Brad Daugherty. However, for the races at Stafford and I-55, Ribbs was instead a color commentator. As was the case in 2021, there was a rotating color commentator in the booth with Bestwick, with Ribbs at Stafford and I–55 and IndyCar Series driver Conor Daly at Five Flags, South Boston and the Nashville Fairgrounds. NASCAR Cup Series driver Joey Logano was the color commentator for the season-finale at Sharon Speedway.

== Season summary ==
=== Race reports ===
All events consist of two heat races, with the lineup for Heat 1 being determined by a random draw. The results of Heat 1 are inverted to determine the lineup for Heat 2. The average finish of both heats is used to determine the lineup for the feature race.

The heat races are 12 minutes each in length. At Five Flags, the feature length was 75 laps with the final 10 laps having to be run under green flag conditions.

=== Five Flags Speedway ===
Prior to the event, Hélio Castroneves was announced as a last minute entrant after not being originally scheduled to compete. Bubba Pollard was awarded pole for Heat 1 based on a random draw. Paul Tracy snatched the lead at the start until Pollard retook it with slightly over eight minutes remaining. With under a minute left, Castroneves spun Ernie Francis Jr. while making a pass attempt but the race stayed green. Pollard proceeded to hold off Tony Kanaan to win the heat. Francis was the polesitter for Heat 2 because of the inversion, however the damage he sustained in the previous heat caused him to drop backwards immediately and forced him into a backup car for the feature. Second place starter Castroneves would win after leading the entire heat.

Due to their successful heat performances, Pollard and Kanaan would bring the field to green for the feature, with Pollard gaining the initial advantage and leading until being passed on lap 7 by Ryan Newman. Pollard retook the lead on lap 12, however it would be short lived as Kanaan surpassed him for first on lap 17. Under the first fun flag caution on lap 21, Pollard was forced to pit due to a flat left rear tire, relegating him to the rear of the field from third position. Kanaan would maintain the lead on the restart and held it after the second fun flag yellow on lap 38. When the feature restarted after the final fun flag with 15 laps remaining, Kanaan and Castroneves would remain side by side for multiple laps before Castroneves eventually prevailed. Castroneves finished first, with Pollard moving Newman for second position on the last lap. In a post race interview, it was revealed that SRX chief executive Don Hawk promised Castroneves a NASCAR ride at Daytona if he won an event.

Heat 1 Top 5 Results:

Pos	No.	Driver
1	26	Bubba Pollard
2	6	Tony Kanaan
3	14	Tony Stewart
4	3	Paul Tracy
5	98	Marco Andretti

Heat 2 Top 5 Results:

Pos	No.	Driver
1	06	Hélio Castroneves
2	15	Michael Waltrip
3	39	Ryan Newman
4	9	Bill Elliott
5	18	Bobby Labonte

Feature Top 5 Results:

Pos	No.	Driver
1	06	Hélio Castroneves
2	26	Bubba Pollard
3	39	Ryan Newman
4	6	Tony Kanaan
5	18	Bobby Labonte

== Results and standings ==
=== Race results ===
No.	Track	Heat 1 winner	Heat 2 winner	Most laps led (feature)	Feature race winner	Report
1	Five Flags Speedway	Bubba Pollard	Hélio Castroneves	Tony Kanaan	Hélio Castroneves	Report
2	South Boston Speedway	Greg Biffle	Hélio Castroneves	Tony Stewart	Tony Stewart	Report
3	Stafford Motor Speedway	Ryan Hunter-Reay	Bobby Labonte	Marco Andretti	Ryan Newman	Report
4	Nashville Fairgrounds Speedway	Josef Newgarden	Cole Williams	Bobby Labonte	Bobby Labonte	Report
5	I-55 Raceway	Ken Schrader	Tony Stewart	Tony Stewart	Tony Stewart	Report
6	Sharon Speedway	Ryan Newman	Chase Elliott	Chase Elliott	Chase Elliott	Report

Points are awarded for both heat races as well as the feature:

Points	Position												
Points	1st	2nd	3rd	4th	5th	6th	7th	8th	9th	10th	11th	12th	13th
Heat	12	11	10	9	8	7	6	5	4	3	2	1	1
Feature	25	22	20	18	16	14	12	10	8	6	4	2	1

=== Drivers' championship ===
(key) * – Most laps led (feature). ^{1} – Heat 1 winner. ^{2} – Heat 2 winner. ^{†} – Driver was ineligible for points in this race.

Pos.	Driver	FIF	SBO	STA	NSV	I55	SHA	Pts
1	(United States) Marco Andretti (Note: During the first race of the year at Five Flags Speedway, Marco Andretti was given a late order to pit. Due to this, Andretti started 12th in Heat #2, instead of 9th. Andretti was awarded 3 additional points, to make up the three positions and address this late call. This issue ended up playing a major part in deciding who won the 2022 SRX Series Season Championship without this solution, Marco Andretti would've finished with 192 points, 1 behind Ryan Newman who finished with 193 points.)	7	8	2*	2	2	9	195
2	(United States) Ryan Newman	3	4	1	6	4	8^{1}	193
3	(United States) Bobby Labonte	5	3	5^{2}	1*	11	5	190
4	(United States) Tony Stewart	10	1*	4	11	1*^{2}	2	188
5	(United States) Greg Biffle	6	2^{1}	10	9	5	6	150
6	(Canada) Paul Tracy	12	12	3	4	8	10	118
7	(United States) Ryan Hunter-Reay	8	9	7^{1}	10	13	4	118
8	(Brazil) Tony Kanaan	4*	6		13	10	11	113
9	(United States) Michael Waltrip	13	11	12	8	7	13	95
10	(United States) Matt Kenseth				3	12	3	61
11	(United States) Ernie Francis Jr.	11	7			6		58
12	(Brazil) Hélio Castroneves	1^{2†}	5^{2}		5			45
13	(United States) Chase Elliott						1*^{2}	43
14	(United States) Ken Schrader					3^{1}		36
15	(United States) Bill Elliott	9		11				31
16	(United States) Hailie Deegan			6^{†}		9		22
17	(United States) Cole Williams				12^{2}			15
18	(United States) Ryan Blaney						7	14
19	(United States) Dave Blaney						12	13
20	(United States) Peyton Sellers		10					10
Drivers Ineligible for points
	(United States) Bubba Pollard	2^{1}						
	(United States) Josef Newgarden				7^{1}			
	(United States) Matt Hirschman			8				
	(United States) Justin Marks			9				

== See also ==
- 2022 NASCAR Cup Series
- 2022 NASCAR Xfinity Series
- 2022 NASCAR Camping World Truck Series
- 2022 IndyCar Series
- 2022 Indy Lights
- 2022 NASCAR Whelen Modified Tour
