= Hav-A-Tampa =

Cigarette brand

- Product type: Cigar, Cigarillo
- Current owner: ITG Brands
- Country: United States, manufactured in Puerto Rico
- Introduced: 1902; 124 years ago
- Markets: United States
- Tagline: "Won't you Hav-A-Tampa cigar?"
- Website: www.itgbrands.com/brands/hav-a-tampa-jewels/

Hav-A-Tampa is an American cigar brand owned by ITG Brands. Hav-A-Tampa Jewels, the company's signature product, are little wood tip cigarillos that have been considered the best selling machine-made wood tipped cigars in the world.

== History ==
The company was founded in Tampa, Florida in 1902. The company's slogan "Won't you Hav-A-Tampa cigar?" helped influenced the city towards the nickname "Cigar City." Its signature product, the "Tampa Jewel" cigar, became widely distributed to service-members in Europe. The factory was located in Ybor City. In 1996, the firm made $140 million on 859 million cigars. In December 1997 the company was sold to Tabacalera for $275 million.

Later, the company was merged into the new company Altadis in 1999, which was later sold to Imperial Tobacco. The Ybor factory was shuttered in 2009, the cigars are now rolled in Puerto Rico. The company was also the first to employ the wooden tip.

Hav-A-Tampa Jewels are described as among the best-selling wood-tipped machine-made cigars worldwide.
