= 2022 SRX South Boston round =

Race details
- Race 2 of 6 in the 2022 SRX Series
- Date: June 25, 2022
- Official name: SRX South Boston
- Location: South Boston, Virginia
- Course: South Boston Speedway; 0.40 mi (0.64 km)
- Distance: 100 laps, 40.00 mi (64.37 km)
- Grid positions set by heat results

Most laps led
- Driver: Tony Stewart
- Laps: 68

Podium
- First: Tony Stewart
- Second: Marco Andretti
- Third: Greg Biffle

Television in the United States
- Network: CBS
- Allen Bestwick and Conor Daly

The 2022 SRX race at South Boston was a Superstar Racing Experience race that was held on June 25, 2022. It was contested over 100 laps on the 0.40-mile (0.64 km) oval. It was the 2nd race of the 2022 SRX Series season. Tony Stewart held off Marco Andretti to claim his third SRX Series victory.

== Entry list ==
#	Driver
1	Ryan Hunter-Reay
3	Paul Tracy
5	Ernie Francis Jr.
06	Hélio Castroneves
6	Tony Kanaan
14	Tony Stewart
15	Michael Waltrip
18	Bobby Labonte
26	Peyton Sellers
39	Ryan Newman
69	Greg Biffle
98	Marco Andretti

== Heat races ==
The heat races were held at 8:00 PM EST. The lineups for the 1st heat were determined by random selection. Following the 1st heat, the field is inverted for the 2nd heat. Points are awarded for each position, and the points set the field.

=== Heat Race 1 ===
Fin.	St	#	Driver	Laps	Points	Status
1	2	69	Greg Biffle	37	12	Running
2	8	14	Tony Stewart	37	11	Running
3	3	98	Marco Andretti	37	10	Running
4	1	18	Bobby Labonte	37	9	Running
5	4	1	Ryan Hunter-Reay	37	8	Running
6	5	26	Peyton Sellers	37	7	Running
7	12	39	Ryan Newman	37	6	Running
8	6	5	Ernie Francis Jr.	37	5	Running
9	10	6	Tony Kanaan	37	4	Running
10	9	15	Michael Waltrip	37	3	Running
11	11	06	Hélio Castroneves	37	2	Running
12	7	3	Paul Tracy	37	1	Running
Official Heat 1 results

=== Heat Race 2 ===
Fin.	St	#	Driver	Laps	Points	Status
1	2	06	Hélio Castroneves	38	12	Running
2	10	98	Marco Andretti	38	11	Running
3	6	39	Ryan Newman	38	10	Running
4	4	6	Tony Kanaan	38	9	Running
5	9	18	Bobby Labonte	38	8	Running
6	11	14	Tony Stewart	38	7	Running
7	3	15	Michael Waltrip	38	6	Running
8	12	69	Greg Biffle	38	5	Running
9	5	5	Ernie Francis Jr.	38	4	Running
10	7	26	Peyton Sellers	38	3	Running
11	8	1	Ryan Hunter-Reay	38	2	Running
12	1	3	Paul Tracy	38	1	Running
Official Heat 2 results

=== Starting Lineup ===
St	#	Driver
1	98	Marco Andretti
2	14	Tony Stewart
3	69	Greg Biffle
4	18	Bobby Labonte
5	39	Ryan Newman
6	06	Hélio Castroneves
7	6	Tony Kanaan
8	26	Peyton Sellers
9	1	Ryan Hunter-Reay
10	5	Ernie Francis Jr.
11	15	Michael Waltrip
12	3	Paul Tracy

== Race results ==
=== Main event ===
Fin.	St	#	Driver	Laps	Led	Points	Status
1	2	14	Tony Stewart	100	68	25	Running
2	3	69	Greg Biffle	100	0	22	Running
3	4	18	Bobby Labonte	100	0	20	Running
4	5	39	Ryan Newman	100	0	18	Running
5	6	06	Hélio Castroneves	100	0	0	Running
6	7	6	Tony Kanaan	100	0	14	Running
7	10	5	Ernie Francis Jr.	100	0	12	Running
8	1	98	Marco Andretti	100	32	10	Running
9	9	1	Ryan Hunter-Reay	100	0	8	Running
10	8	26	Peyton Sellers	100	0	6	Running
11	11	15	Michael Waltrip	68	0	4	Out
12	12	3	Paul Tracy	34	0	2	Out
Official Main event results
