= 2022 SRX Pensacola round =

Race details
- Race 1 of 6 in the 2022 SRX Series
- Date: June 18, 2022
- Official name: SRX Pensacola
- Location: Pensacola, Florida
- Course: Five Flags Speedway; 0.50 mi (0.80 km)
- Distance: 75 laps, 37.50 mi (60.35 km)
- Grid positions set by heat results

Most laps led
- Driver: Tony Kanaan
- Laps: 43

Podium
- First: Hélio Castroneves
- Second: Bubba Pollard
- Third: Ryan Newman

Television in the United States
- Network: CBS
- Allen Bestwick and Conor Daly

The 2022 SRX race at Pensacola was a Superstar Racing Experience race that was held on June 18, 2022. It was contested over 75 laps on the 0.50-mile (0.80 km) oval. It was the 1st race of the 2022 SRX Series season. Hélio Castroneves held off local-star Bubba Pollard to claim his first SRX Series victory.

== Entry list ==
#	Driver	Series	Car color
1	Ryan Hunter-Reay	NTT IndyCar Series	Black
3	Paul Tracy	NTT IndyCar Series	Lime
5	Ernie Francis Jr.	Indy Lights	Blue
06	Hélio Castroneves	NTT IndyCar Series	Maroon
6	Tony Kanaan	NTT IndyCar Series	Pink
9	Bill Elliott	NASCAR Cup Series	Purple
14	Tony Stewart	NASCAR Cup Series	Red
15	Michael Waltrip	NASCAR Cup Series	Light Blue
18	Bobby Labonte	NASCAR Cup Series	White
26	Bubba Pollard	Deep South Crane Blizzard Series	Patriotic
39	Ryan Newman	NASCAR Cup Series	Dark Blue
69	Greg Biffle	NASCAR Cup Series	Gold
98	Marco Andretti	NTT IndyCar Series	Orange

== Heat races ==
The heat races were held at 8:00 PM EST. The lineups for the heat were determined by random selection. Following the 1st heat, the field is inverted for the 2nd heat. Points are awarded for each position, and the points set the field.

=== Heat Race 1 ===
Fin.	St	#	Driver	Laps	Points	Status
1	1	26	Bubba Pollard	33	0	Running
2	3	6	Tony Kanaan	33	11	Running
3	8	14	Tony Stewart	33	10	Running
4	2	3	Paul Tracy	33	9	Running
5	6	98	Marco Andretti	33	8	Running
6	4	1	Ryan-Hunter Reay	33	7	Running
7	5	39	Ryan Newman	33	6	Running
8	11	18	Bobby Labonte	33	5	Running
9	7	9	Bill Elliott	33	4	Running
10	9	69	Greg Biffle	33	3	Running
11	12	15	Michael Waltrip	33	2	Running
12	13	06	Hélio Castroneves	33	0	Running
13	10	5	Ernie Francis Jr.	32	1	Running
Official Heat 1 results

=== Heat Race 2 ===
Fin.	St	#	Driver	Laps	Points	Status
1	2	06	Hélio Castroneves	33	0	Running
2	3	15	Michael Waltrip	33	11	Running
3	7	39	Ryan Newman	33	10	Running
4	5	9	Bill Elliott	33	9	Running
5	6	18	Bobby Labonte	33	8	Running
6	12	6	Tony Kanaan	33	7	Running
7	13	26	Bubba Pollard	33	0	Running
8	11	14	Tony Stewart	33	5	Running
9	4	69	Greg Biffle	33	4	Running
10	9	98	Marco Andretti	33	6	Running
11	10	3	Paul Tracy	33	2	Running
12	8	1	Ryan Hunter-Reay	33	1	Running
13	1	5	Ernie Francis Jr.	14	1	Not running
Official Heat 2 results

=== Starting Lineup ===
St	#	Driver
1	26	Bubba Pollard
2	6	Tony Kanaan
3	39	Ryan Newman
4	14	Tony Stewart
5	06	Hélio Castroneves
6	15	Michael Waltrip
7	9	Bill Elliott
8	18	Bobby Labonte
9	3	Paul Tracy
10	98	Marco Andretti
11	1	Ryan Hunter-Reay
12	69	Greg Biffle
13	5	Ernie Francis Jr.

== Race results ==
=== Main event ===
Fin.	St	#	Driver	Laps	Led	Points	Status
1	5	06	Hélio Castroneves	75	16	0	Running
2	1	26	Bubba Pollard	75	11	0	Running
3	3	39	Ryan Newman	75	5	20	Running
4	2	6	Tony Kanaan	75	43	18	Running
5	8	18	Bobby Labonte	75	0	16	Running
6	12	69	Greg Biffle	75	0	14	Running
7	10	98	Marco Andretti	75	0	12	Running
8	11	1	Ryan Hunter-Reay	75	0	10	Running
9	7	9	Bill Elliott	75	0	8	Running
10	4	14	Tony Stewart	75	0	6	Running
11	13	5	Ernie Francis Jr.	75	0	4	Running
12	9	3	Paul Tracy	75	0	2	Running
13	6	15	Michael Waltrip	75	0	2	Running
Official Main event results

== Championship standings after the race ==
Drivers' Championship standings

	Pos.	Driver	Points
Unchanged	1	Tony Kanaan	36
Unchanged	1	Ryan Newman	36
Unchanged	3	Bobby Labonte	29
Unchanged	4	Marco Andretti	26
Unchanged	5	Tony Stewart	21

- Note: Only the top five positions are included for standings.
