= I-55 Raceway =

Motorsport track in Missouri, United States

Federated Auto Parts Raceway at I-55
The Ironman Track
- Location: 1540 Herky Horine Road, Pevely, Missouri, 63070
- Coordinates: 38.2696°N 90.4017°W
- Owner: Josh Carroll
- Opened: June 15, 1974
- Former names: I-55 Raceways (1974 - 1991); I-55 Raceway (1992 - 2011)

Oval
- Surface: Dirt
- Length: 0.34 mi (0.54 km)
- Turns: 4
- Banking: 19 Degrees in Turns; 10 Degrees on Straightaways

I-55 Raceway, currently known for sponsorship reasons as Federated Auto Parts Raceway at I-55, is a 1/3-mile (0.54 km) dirt track located in Pevely, Missouri. The tack is owned by Josh Carroll. Federated Auto Parts is the title sponsor of the track.

== History ==
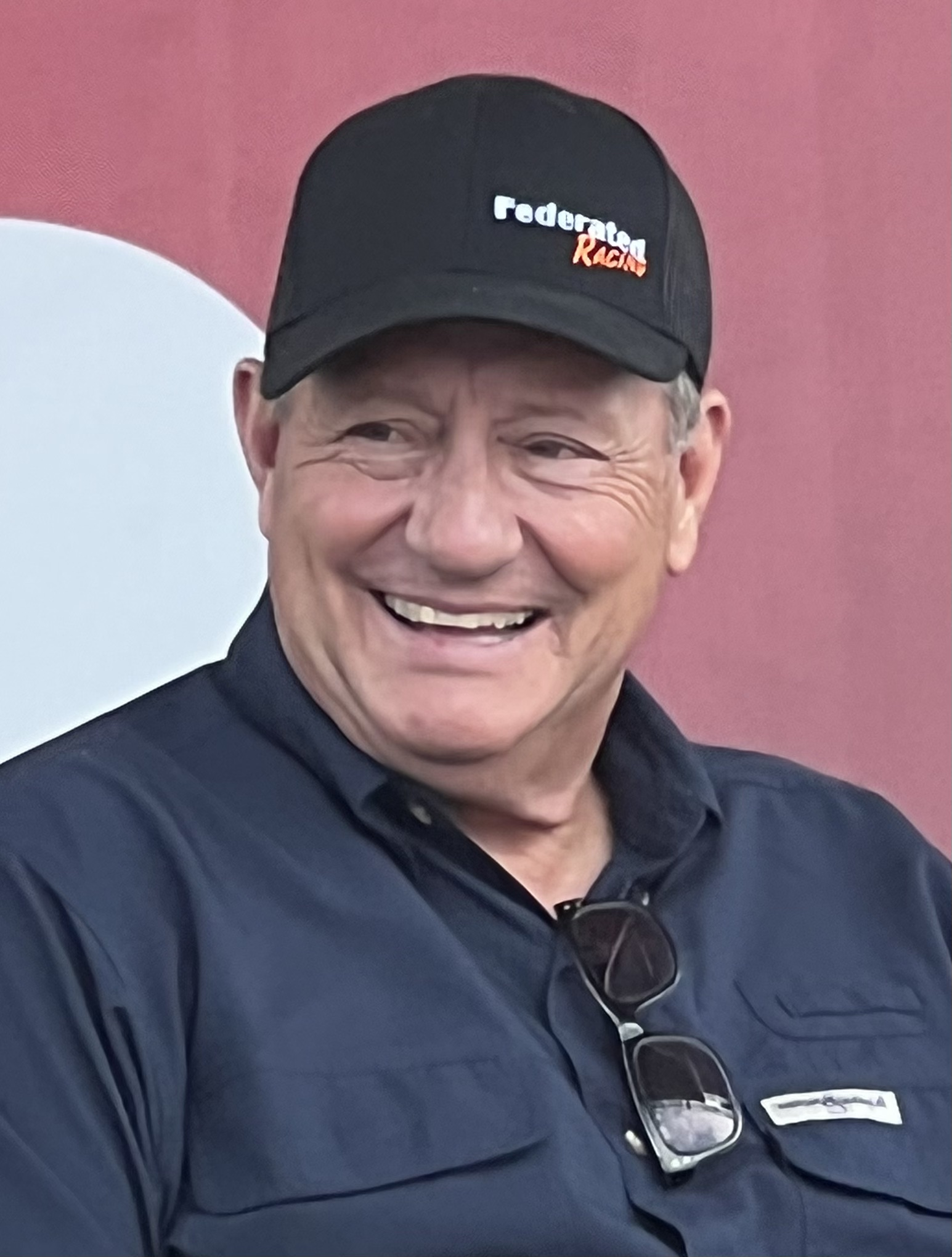
The track was formerly co-owned by former NASCAR driver Ken Schrader

Races are held at the track every Saturday night except during winter. Series that race at the track include the U.M.P. DIRTcar Late Models, U.M.P. DIRTcar Modifieds, U.M.P. DIRTcar Pro Modifieds, U.M.P. DIRTcar/A.A.R.A. Sportsman and U.M.P. DIRTcar/A.A.R.A Pro 4 Stocks.

The track is notable for hosting a Superstar Racing Experience (SRX) race in 2022, wherein it was won by SRX Series co-founder Tony Stewart, another former NASCAR driver. Former track owner Ken Schrader competed in the race as a guest driver and finished third.

Brad Sweet has won six World of Outlaws races at the track (tied for the most he has at one track), the most recent being on April 14, 2023.

The track was formerly owned by Ray Marler and former NASCAR driver Ken Schrader. On December 13, 2024, it was announced that after 29 years of ownership, Schrader and Marler had agreed to sell the track to Josh Carroll

The track has first hosted the World of Outlaws in 1987, since then the Sprint Car Series has regularly included I-55 Raceway on its national schedule. As of 2025, the venue had hosted approximately 75 World of Outlaws events, ranking it among the most frequently visited tracks in the series’ history. The I-55 track is famous for its steep banking, fast racing surface, and restricted tight boundaries, therefore creating a close and competitive events. One of the most successful drivers at I-55 is Craig Dollansky. He achieved three Ironman 55 consecutive wins at the track from 2011 to 2013. Dollansky described the track as intense and demanding, comparing to "a smaller Eldora Speedway" with shorter straightaways which needs more focus and aggression all the through.

In addition to World of Outlaws competition, I-55 has hosted other touring dirt racing organizations. The American Sprint Car Series (ASCS) National Tour announced plans to return to the track in September 2025, marking its first appearance there since 1995. The racers of the ASCS battled it out on the I-55 for a $10,000 prize. The event was won by Matt Covington, who captured his third win of the season.
