= Superstar Racing Experience =

American stock car racing series

Superstar Racing Experience (SRX Racing)
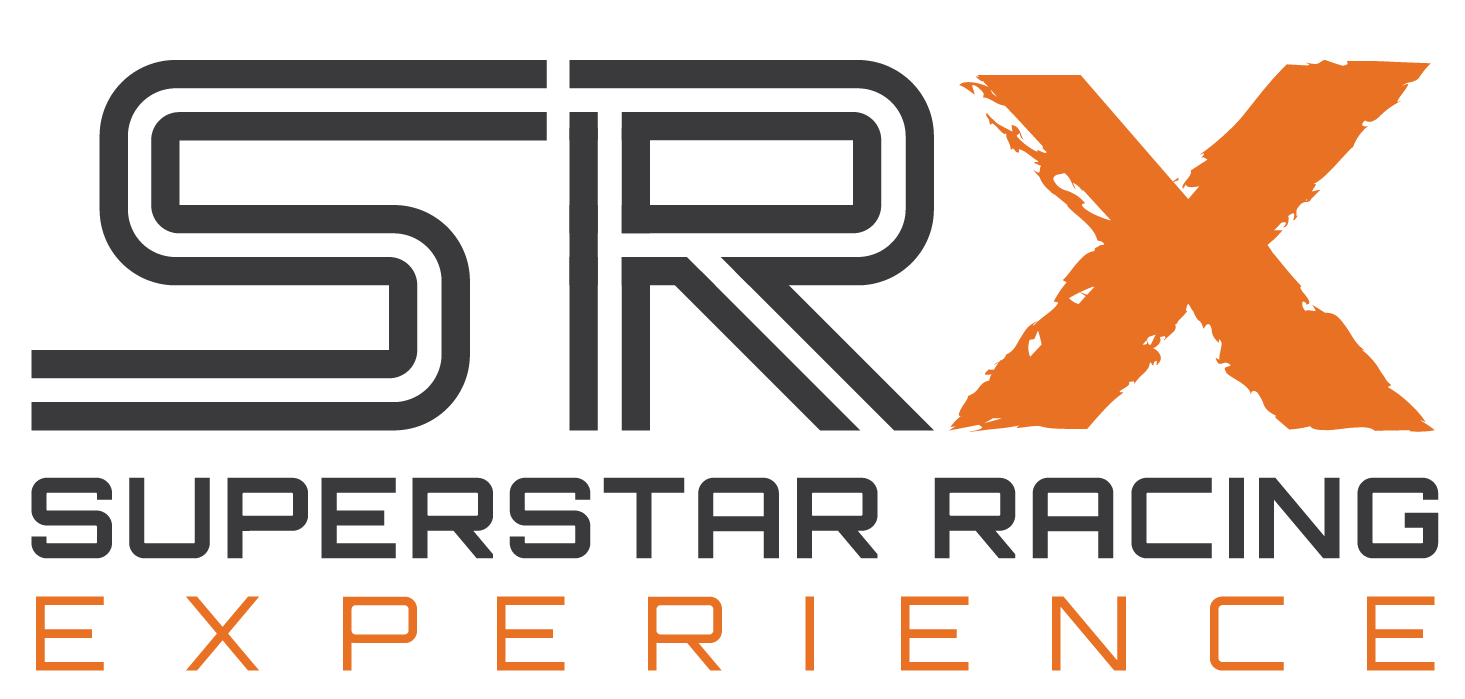
- Category: Auto racing
- Country: United States
- Inaugural season: 2021
- Folded: 2023
- Drivers: 12–13 (per race)
- Engine suppliers: Ilmor
- Tire suppliers: Goodyear
- Last Drivers' champion: Ryan Newman (2023)
- Official website: SRXracing.com

Superstar Racing Experience (SRX), officially known as the Camping World SRX Series, was an American stock car racing series founded by Tony Stewart, Ray Evernham, Sandy Montag and George Pyne. The formation of the series was announced on July 13, 2020, and debuted on June 12, 2021, televised on CBS on Saturday nights.

== History ==
On July 13, 2020, it was reported that SRX was in preparation for a 2021 debut season. The series' founders included former NASCAR driver and former team owner Tony Stewart, former NASCAR team owner and crew chief Ray Evernham as well as former NASCAR executive George Pyne and sports agent Sandy Montag. Initially, series management was split between New York City and Charlotte, North Carolina.

Camping World acquired the naming rights to the series on June 1, 2021, dubbing it the Camping World SRX Series.

On January 20, 2022, Don Hawk was named CEO of SRX. On March 30, Evernham announced via Twitter that he was no longer in charge of SRX, but has kept his role as an investor of the sport. The second season began on June 18 with races on Saturday nights. Its third season aired on July 13, 2023, on ESPN with the series moving races to Thursday nights.

On January 11, 2024, with 5 of 6 races scheduled, it was announced that the 2024 season was postponed due to market factors. Evernham later stated in an interview with Forbes that the poor television ratings for the third season was the primary market factor for the cancellation of the series.

On March 22, 2024, the Skip Barber Racing School announced that it had acquired the series and attempted to form a plan for a 2024 season. The sale was reported to have fallen through in August, resulting in SRX management filing a lawsuit. The series' fleet of cars was purchased by GMS Race Cars (related to GMS Racing) in September 2025.

== Championship ==
SRX drew direct contrast from NASCAR when aiming for shorter races at shorter tracks, and also with the random pairing of driver and crew chief for each race. Founder Tony Stewart compared it to IROC by comparing the aspects of identical cars and an all-star cast of drivers.

=== Cars ===
SRX cars were completely designed by founder Ray Evernham and were in concept stage when the series was founded in July 2020. Teaser photos of the car showed it had a high rear spoiler and is said to have high horsepower and low downforce. Fury Race Cars serves as the cars' chassis designer and builder. The cars used naturally aspirated Ilmor V8 396 cui engines, which are primarily featured in the ARCA Menards Series, with components from Edelbrock, while brakes were provided by Performance Friction Corporation (PFC).

Drivers received their cars before each race via random draw. A driver's car retained its color for the full season for easy identification.

=== Drivers ===
The series' lineup was made up of younger up and coming drivers looking for exposure in addition to the older and retired drivers. In addition to those running the full schedule, the series provided a "Rocky Balboa" car for a local champion at each track and a "ringer" entry for notable drivers making cameo appearances.

The drivers for the inaugural SRX season included Tony Stewart, Bobby Labonte, Hélio Castroneves, Ernie Francis Jr., Paul Tracy, Bill Elliott, Willy T. Ribbs, Michael Waltrip and Marco Andretti for all six races.

Part-time drivers and Local Legend drivers included: Tony Kanaan, Hailie Deegan, Greg Biffle, Scott Speed, Doug Coby, Brian Brown, Scott Bloomquist, Kody Swanson, Luke Fenhaus, Chase Elliott, Matt Kenseth and Kyle Busch.

=== Tracks ===
Races were primarily held on half-mile dirt and asphalt short tracks. The six tracks from the series' first season was Stafford Motor Speedway, Knoxville Raceway, Eldora Speedway, Lucas Oil Raceway, Slinger Speedway, and Nashville Fairgrounds Speedway. The 2022 schedule featured Five Flags Speedway, South Boston Speedway, Stafford Motor Speedway, Nashville Fairgrounds Speedway, I-55 Raceway and Sharon Speedway. The 2023 schedule featured Stafford and Eldora, but also featured new tracks Motor Mile Speedway, Berlin Raceway and Lucas Oil Speedway. Thunder Road SpeedBowl was originally part of the 2023 schedule but due to flooding in the area the track was given a 2024 date, and was joined by Berlin, Stafford, Slinger and new track Cedar Lake Speedway.

=== Race format ===
Races lasted 90 minutes without pit stops, though there was also a "halftime" for adjustments to be made to the car.

Two 12-minute heat races took place before the feature; the final lap began when time ran out and the leader crossed the start/finish line. A random draw set the starting lineup for the first heat, while the second was determined by an inversion of the first race's finishing results. The duration of the heats was originally set to 15 minutes before being changed following the inaugural race.

The feature race was 100 laps long at all paved ovals but Slinger, where the distance was 150 laps, while the dirt tracks had 50-lap features. The starting order was based on average finishing position between the two heats. There are also unlimited attempts at a green–white–checker finish.

Points	Position												
Points	1st	2nd	3rd	4th	5th	6th	7th	8th	9th	10th	11th	12th	13th
Heat	12	11	10	9	8	7	6	5	4	3	2	1	1
Feature	25	22	20	18	16	14	12	10	8	6	4	2	1

== Statistics ==
Updated August 10, 2023

Driver	Starts	Wins	Podiums	Heat Wins	Most Laps Led	DNFs
Tony Stewart	18	5	10	6	4	0
Ernie Francis Jr.	10	1	2	0	1	0
Bobby Labonte	18	1	3	2	1	1
Marco Andretti	18	1	5	2	1	0
Hélio Castroneves	12	1	2	4	0	0
Paul Tracy	15	0	1	0	1	5
Michael Waltrip	12	0	0	0	0	2
Bill Elliott	8	0	1	1	1	2
Willy T. Ribbs	6	0	0	0	0	1
Tony Kanaan	12	0	0	0	1	0
Hailie Deegan	11	0	2	0	0	0
Scott Speed	2	0	1	1	0	0
Greg Biffle	9	0	2	2	0	0
Doug Coby	1	1	1	1	1	0
Chase Elliott	2	2	2	1	1	0
Luke Fenhaus	1	0	1	1	1	0
Kody Swanson	1	0	1	0	0	0
Bobby Santos III	1	0	0	0	0	0
Scott Bloomquist	1	0	0	1	0	0
Brian Brown	1	0	0	0	0	0
Ken Schrader	7	0	2	0	1	1
Matt Kenseth	4	0	2	0	0	0
Ryan Newman	12	2	6	2	0	0
Cole Williams	1	0	0	1	0	0
Ryan Blaney	1	0	0	0	0	0
Dave Blaney	1	0	0	0	0	0
Peyton Sellers	1	0	0	0	0	0
Bubba Pollard	1	0	1	1	0	0
Josef Newgarden	1	0	0	1	0	0
Matt Hirschman	1	0	0	0	0	0
Justin Marks	1	0	0	0	0	0
Ryan Hunter-Reay	6	0	0	1	0	0
Denny Hamlin	1	1	1	1	1	0
Kyle Busch	2	2	2	0	1	0
Daniel Suárez	1	0	1	0	0	0
Brad Keselowski	6	0	2	3	1	0
Clint Bowyer	2	0	1	1	0	0
Kenny Wallace	2	0	0	0	0	0
Kevin Harvick	2	0	0	0	0	0
Ryan Preece	1	0	0	0	1	0
Kasey Kahne	1	0	0	0	0	0
Johnny Benson Jr.	1	0	0	0	0	0
Austin Dillon	1	0	0	0	0	0
Ron Capps	1	0	0	0	0	0
Chase Briscoe	1	0	0	0	0	0
Jonathan Davenport	1	1	1	1	1	0

== Series champions ==
=== Drivers ===
Year	Car No.	Driver	Point Spread
2021	14	Tony Stewart	+45
2022	98	Marco Andretti (Note: During the first race of the 2022 SRX Series Season at Five Flags Speedway, Marco Andretti was given a late order to pit. Due to this, Andretti started 12th in Heat #2, instead of 9th. Andretti was awarded 3 additional points, to make up the three positions and address this late call. This issue ended up playing a major part in deciding who won the 2022 SRX Series Season Championship without this solution, Marco Andretti would have finished with 192 points, 1 behind Ryan Newman who finished with 193 points.)	+2
2023	39	Ryan Newman	+45

== Media ==
CBS Sports aired the 2021 and 2022 six-race season in two-hour primetime Saturday night television windows on the main CBS network.

On April 14, 2021, CBS announced their broadcast team for the inaugural season. Veteran motorsports announcer Allen Bestwick served as lead announcer, with Lindsay Czarniak as host, Brad Daugherty as roaming reporter, and Matt Yocum on pit road. Three driver analysts, Danica Patrick (Stafford and Knoxville), James Hinchcliffe (Eldora, Slinger and Nashville Fairgrounds), and Dario Franchitti (Lucas Oil) were the color analysts for the inaugural season.

Bestwick, Yocum, Daugherty, and Czarniak returned for the 2022 season, while 2021 driver Willy T. Ribbs joined the broadcast team as an analyst. Conor Daly was signed as a driver analyst.

A video game based on the series, titled SRX: The Game and developed by Monster Games, was released for PlayStation 4, Xbox One and Steam on May 28, 2021.

For the 2023 season, races were held on Thursday nights and televised on ESPN, reviving its former Thursday Night Thunder branding, which had been used from 1989 to 2002 for primetime broadcasts of short track races.

== See also ==
- International Race of Champions
- Fast Masters
- Grand Prix Masters
