= Devon Rouse =

American racing driver (born 1998)

- Born: July 18, 1998 (age 28); Burlington, Iowa, U.S.

NASCAR FedEx Freight Truck Series career
- 2 races run over 2 years
- 2022 position: 73rd
- Best finish: 69th (2021)
- First race: 2021 Corn Belt 150 (Knoxville)
- Last race: 2022 Clean Harbors 150 (Knoxville)
Wins	Top tens	Poles
0	0	0
- Statistics up to date as of November 5, 2022.

Devon Rouse (born July 18, 1998) is an American professional dirt track and stock car racing driver who primarily competes in sprint cars at local tracks in Iowa. He also competed in two races in the NASCAR Camping World Truck Series, driving the No. 43 Chevrolet Silverado for Reaume Brothers Racing.

== Racing career ==
A fan of NASCAR Cup Series champion Jeff Gordon who hoped to emulate his career path from dirt to stock car racing, Rouse began kart racing when he was three years old. He competed in the discipline until he was 13 and won six track championships at Shimek Speedway prior to its closing; he also competed in modified cars for six years.

On his 17th birthday, Rouse received a sprint car from his parents and started racing at 34 Raceway. He finished third in the track's class standings in 2016, followed by second the following year.

While vacationing in Florida in October 2019, Rouse befriended a NASCAR Camping World Truck Series crew member who invited him to travel with the team for six weeks. In January 2020, Rouse tested a truck at Myrtle Beach Speedway. He had planned to run the Truck Series' Eldora Dirt Derby at Eldora Speedway before the race was canceled due to the COVID-19 pandemic.

Before the 2021 racing season, he joined Fast Track Racing for the ARCA Menards Series test at Daytona International Speedway. Running the Friday practice session, he was the 46th-fastest driver of 56 in total. He also signed with Reaume Brothers Racing to run the Truck Series' Pinty's Dirt Truck Race and Corn Belt 150 at Bristol Motor Speedway and Knoxville Raceway, respectively, though the former was aborted due to sponsorship issues and personal reasons.

Rouse has not competed in any stock car races since 2022.

== Personal life ==
Rouse graduated from West Burlington High School in Iowa in 2016 and was a business administration major at Southeastern Community College. He worked at DuPont in Fort Madison for three years before forming a detailing business.

Rouse is gay. When he participated in the ARCA test at Daytona in 2021, he became the first openly LGBT driver to compete in an ARCA-sanctioned event. His Truck debut at Knoxville later that year made him the first such driver to race in the series since Stephen Rhodes in 2003.

== Motorsports career results ==
=== NASCAR ===
(key) (Bold – Pole position awarded by qualifying time. Italics – Pole position earned by points standings or practice time. * – Most laps led.)

==== Camping World Truck Series ====
NASCAR Camping World Truck Series results
Year	Team	No.	Make	1	2	3	4	5	6	7	8	9	10	11	12	13	14	15	16	17	18	19	20	21	22	23	NCWTC	Pts	Ref
2021	Reaume Brothers Racing	33	Chevy	DAY	DAY	LVS	ATL	BRI	RCH	KAN	DAR	COA	CLT	TEX	NSH	POC	KNX; 18	GLN	GTW	DAR	BRI	LVS	TAL	MAR	PHO		69th	19	
2022	Reaume Brothers Racing	43	Chevy	DAY	LVS	ATL	COA	MAR	BRI	DAR	KAN	TEX	CLT	GTW	SON	KNX; 30	NSH	MOH	POC	IRP	RCH	KAN	BRI	TAL	HOM	PHO	73rd	7	

^{*} Season still in progress
^{1} Ineligible for series points

== See also ==
- List of LGBT sportspeople
