= Parker Price-Miller =

American racing driver

- Born: Parker D. Price-Miller; May 2, 1998 (age 28); Kokomo, Indiana, U.S.

NASCAR FedEx Freight Truck Series career
- 1 race run over 1 year
- 2021 position: 83rd
- Best finish: 83rd (2021)
- First race: 2021 Corn Belt 150 (Knoxville)
| Wins | Top tens | Poles |
|---|---|---|
| 0 | 0 | 0 |
- Statistics up to date as of December 30, 2021.

Parker D. Price-Miller (born May 2, 1998) is an American professional Sprint Car driver. Price-Miller made his NASCAR Camping World Truck Series debut in the No. 3 Chevrolet Silverado for Jordan Anderson Racing at the 2021 Corn Belt 150 at Knoxville Raceway. Price-Miller is also referred to by his nickname "The Law Firm".

In October 2021, Price-Miller announced he was diagnosed with B-cell lymphoma, the most common form of Non-Hodgkin's lymphoma.

== Motorsports career results ==
=== NASCAR ===
(key) (Bold – Pole position awarded by qualifying time. Italics – Pole position earned by points standings or practice time. * – Most laps led.)

==== Camping World Truck Series ====
NASCAR Camping World Truck Series results
| Year | Team | No. | Make | 1 | 2 | 3 | 4 | 5 | 6 | 7 | 8 | 9 | 10 | 11 | 12 | 13 | 14 | 15 | 16 | 17 | 18 | 19 | 20 | 21 | 22 | NCWTC | Pts | Ref |
|---|---|---|---|---|---|---|---|---|---|---|---|---|---|---|---|---|---|---|---|---|---|---|---|---|---|---|---|---|
| 2021 | Jordan Anderson Racing | 3 | Chevy | DAY | DAY | LVS | ATL | BRI | RCH | KAN | DAR | COA | CLT | TEX | NSH | POC | KNX; 29 | GLN | GTW | DAR | BRI | LVS | TAL | MAR | PHO | 83rd | 8 | |

^{*} Season still in progress
^{1} Ineligible for series points
