= 2022 Clean Harbors 150 =

Thirteenth race of the 2022 NASCAR Camping World Truck Series

2022 Clean Harbors 150 presented by Premier Chevy Dealers
Race details
- Race 13 of 23 of the 2022 NASCAR Camping World Truck Series
- Date: June 18, 2022
- Official name: Second Annual Clean Harbors 150
- Location: Knoxville Raceway, Knoxville, Iowa
- Course: Permanent racing facility
- Course length: .5 miles (0.80 km)
- Distance: 150 laps, 75 mi (121 km)
- Average speed: 34.061 mph (54.816 km/h)

Pole position
Driver	Derek Kraus	McAnally–Hilgemann Racing
- Grid positions set by heat results

Most laps led
Driver	Carson Hocevar	Niece Motorsports
- Laps: 65

Winner
No. 17	Todd Gilliland	David Gilliland Racing

Television in the United States
- Network: Fox Sports 1
- Announcers: Vince Welch, Phil Parsons, Trevor Bayne

Radio in the United States
- Radio: Motor Racing Network

The 2022 Clean Harbors 150 presented by Premier Chevy Dealers was the thirteenth stock car race of the 2022 NASCAR Camping World Truck Series, and the second iteration of the event. The race was held on Saturday, June 18, 2022, in Knoxville, Iowa, at Knoxville Raceway, a .5 miles (0.80 km) permanent oval dirt track. The race took its scheduled 150 laps to complete. Todd Gilliland, driving for his father's team, David Gilliland Racing, held off John Hunter Nemechek on the final restart, and earned his 3rd career NASCAR Camping World Truck Series win, along with his first of the season. To fill out the podium, Zane Smith, driving for Front Row Motorsports, would finish in 3rd.

== Background ==
Knoxville Raceway is a semi-banked 1/2 mile dirt oval raceway (zook clay) located at the Marion County Fairgrounds in Knoxville, Iowa, United States. Races at the "Sprint Car Capital of the World" are held on Saturday nights from April through September each year. Some special events such as the Knoxville Nationals, 360 Knoxville Nationals and Late Model Knoxville Nationals are multi-day events. Weekly racing events at the track features multiple classes of sprint cars including 410 cubic inch, 360 cubic inch and Pro Sprints (previously 305 cubic inch). Each August, the Raceway holds the paramount sprint car event in the United States, the Knoxville Nationals. The track is governed by the 24-member fair board elected by Marion County residents.

=== Entry list ===
- (R) denotes rookie driver.
- (i) denotes driver who are ineligible for series driver points.

#	Driver	Team	Make
1	Hailie Deegan	David Gilliland Racing	Ford
02	Kaz Grala	Young's Motorsports	Chevrolet
3	Dylan Westbrook	Jordan Anderson Racing	Chevrolet
4	John Hunter Nemechek	Kyle Busch Motorsports	Toyota
6	Norm Benning	Norm Benning Racing	Chevrolet
9	Blaine Perkins (R)	CR7 Motorsports	Chevrolet
12	Spencer Boyd	Young's Motorsports	Chevrolet
15	Tanner Gray	David Gilliland Racing	Ford
16	Tyler Ankrum	Hattori Racing Enterprises	Toyota
17	Todd Gilliland (i)	David Gilliland Racing	Ford
18	Chandler Smith	Kyle Busch Motorsports	Toyota
19	Derek Kraus	McAnally–Hilgemann Racing	Chevrolet
20	Thad Moffitt	Young's Motorsports	Chevrolet
22	Brett Moffitt (i)	AM Racing	Chevrolet
23	Grant Enfinger	GMS Racing	Chevrolet
24	Jack Wood (R)	GMS Racing	Chevrolet
25	Matt DiBenedetto	Rackley W.A.R.	Chevrolet
30	Joey Gase (i)	On Point Motorsports	Toyota
33	Brayton Laster	Reaume Brothers Racing	Chevrolet
38	Zane Smith	Front Row Motorsports	Ford
40	Dean Thompson (R)	Niece Motorsports	Chevrolet
41	Tyler Carpenter	Niece Motorsports	Chevrolet
42	Carson Hocevar	Niece Motorsports	Chevrolet
43	Devon Rouse	Reaume Brothers Racing	Chevrolet
44	Kris Wright	Niece Motorsports	Chevrolet
45	Lawless Alan (R)	Niece Motorsports	Chevrolet
46	Bryson Mitchell	G2G Racing	Toyota
51	Buddy Kofoid	Kyle Busch Motorsports	Toyota
52	Stewart Friesen	Halmar Friesen Racing	Toyota
53	Braden Mitchell	Sparks Motorsports	Chevrolet
56	Timmy Hill	Hill Motorsports	Toyota
61	Chase Purdy	Hattori Racing Enterprises	Toyota
62	Jessica Friesen	Halmar Friesen Racing	Toyota
66	Ty Majeski	ThorSport Racing	Toyota
88	Matt Crafton	ThorSport Racing	Toyota
91	Colby Howard	McAnally–Hilgemann Racing	Chevrolet
98	Christian Eckes	ThorSport Racing	Toyota
99	Ben Rhodes	ThorSport Racing	Toyota
Official entry list

== Practice ==
=== First practice ===
The first 50-minute was held on Friday, June 17, at 6:05 PM CST. Ben Rhodes, driving for ThorSport Racing, would set the fastest time in the session, with a time of 23.033 seconds, and a speed of 78.149 mph (125.769 km/h).

Pos.	#	Driver	Team	Make	Time	Speed
1	99	Ben Rhodes	ThorSport Racing	Toyota	23.033	78.149
2	52	Stewart Friesen	Halmar Friesen Racing	Toyota	23.407	76.900
3	42	Carson Hocevar	Niece Motorsports	Chevrolet	23.437	76.802
Full first practice results

=== Final practice ===
The final 25-minute practice session was held on Friday, June 17, at 8:02 PM CST. Carson Hocevar, driving for Niece Motorsports, would set the fastest time in the session, with a time of 23.508 seconds, and a speed of 76.570 mph (123.227 km/h).

Pos.	#	Driver	Team	Make	Time	Speed
1	42	Carson Hocevar	Niece Motorsports	Chevrolet	23.508	76.570
2	18	Chandler Smith	Kyle Busch Motorsports	Toyota	23.691	75.978
3	88	Matt Crafton	ThorSport Racing	Toyota	23.756	75.770
Full final practice results

== Qualifying ==
Qualifying was held on Saturday, June 18, at 6:00 PM CST. For qualifying, drivers will be split into four different 15 lap heat races, and their finishing position will determine the starting lineup. John Hunter Nemechek, Carson Hocevar, Hailie Deegan, and Todd Gilliland would win the 4 heat races, as Derek Kraus would win the pole.

=== Race 1 ===
Fin.	St	#	Driver	Team	Make	Laps	Led	Status
1	2	4	John Hunter Nemechek	Kyle Busch Motorsports	Toyota	15	15	Running
2	8	19	Derek Kraus	McAnally–Hilgemann Racing	Chevrolet	15	0	Running
3	1	38	Zane Smith	Front Row Motorsports	Ford	15	0	Running
4	6	16	Tyler Ankrum	Hattori Racing Enterprises	Toyota	15	0	Running
5	4	22	Brett Moffitt (i)	AM Racing	Chevrolet	15	0	Running
6	3	30	Joey Gase (i)	On Point Motorsports	Toyota	15	0	Running
7	5	20	Thad Moffitt	Young's Motorsports	Chevrolet	15	0	Running
8	7	43	Devon Rouse	Reaume Brothers Racing	Chevrolet	15	0	Running
9	10	33	Brayton Laster	Reaume Brothers Racing	Chevrolet	15	0	Running
10	9	6	Norm Benning	Norm Benning Racing	Chevrolet	14	0	Running
Official Race 1 results

=== Race 2 ===
Fin.	St	#	Driver	Team	Make	Laps	Led	Status
1	5	42	Carson Hocevar	Niece Motorsports	Chevrolet	15	7	Running
2	1	18	Chandler Smith	Kyle Busch Motorsports	Toyota	15	8	Running
3	4	23	Grant Enfinger	GMS Racing	Chevrolet	15	0	Running
4	2	62	Jessica Friesen	Halmar Friesen Racing	Toyota	15	0	Running
5	6	40	Dean Thompson (R)	Niece Motorsports	Chevrolet	15	0	Running
6	7	88	Matt Crafton	ThorSport Racing	Toyota	15	0	Running
7	9	98	Christian Eckes	ThorSport Racing	Toyota	15	0	Running
8	10	46	Bryson Mitchell	G2G Racing	Toyota	15	0	Running
9	8	53	Braden Mitchell	Sparks Motorsports	Chevrolet	15	0	Running
10	3	24	Jack Wood (R)	GMS Racing	Chevrolet	15	0	Running
Official Race 2 results

=== Race 3 ===
Fin.	St	#	Driver	Team	Make	Laps	Led	Status
1	2	1	Hailie Deegan	David Gilliland Racing	Ford	15	15	Running
2	5	51	Buddy Kofoid	Kyle Busch Motorsports	Toyota	15	0	Running
3	7	99	Ben Rhodes	ThorSport Racing	Toyota	15	0	Running
4	6	41	Tyler Carpenter	Niece Motorsports	Chevrolet	15	0	Running
5	8	25	Matt DiBenedetto	Rackley W.A.R.	Chevrolet	15	0	Running
6	1	44	Kris Wright	Niece Motorsports	Chevrolet	15	0	Running
7	4	61	Chase Purdy	Hattori Racing Enterprises	Toyota	15	0	Running
8	9	3	Dylan Westbrook	Jordan Anderson Racing	Chevrolet	15	0	Running
9	3	12	Spencer Boyd	Young's Motorsports	Chevrolet	15	0	Running
Official Race 3 results

=== Race 4 ===
Fin.	St	#	Driver	Team	Make	Laps	Led	Status
1	1	17	Todd Gilliland (i)	David Gilliland Racing	Ford	15	15	Running
2	4	66	Ty Majeski	ThorSport Racing	Toyota	15	0	Running
3	7	52	Stewart Friesen	Halmar Friesen Racing	Toyota	15	0	Running
4	2	15	Tanner Gray	David Gilliland Racing	Toyota	15	0	Running
5	3	91	Colby Howard	McAnally–Hilgemann Racing	Chevrolet	15	0	Running
6	8	02	Kaz Grala	Young's Motorsports	Chevrolet	15	0	Running
7	6	56	Timmy Hill	Hill Motorsports	Toyota	15	0	Running
8	5	9	Blaine Perkins (R)	CR7 Motorsports	Chevrolet	15	0	Running
9	9	45	Lawless Alan (R)	Niece Motorsports	Chevrolet	15	0	Running
Official Race 4 results

=== Starting lineup ===
Pos.	#	Driver	Team	Make
1	19	Derek Kraus	McAnally–Hilgemann Racing	Chevrolet
2	42	Carson Hocevar	Niece Motorsports	Chevrolet
3	99	Ben Rhodes	ThorSport Racing	Toyota
4	52	Stewart Friesen	Halmar Friesen Racing	Toyota
5	51	Buddy Kofoid	Kyle Busch Motorsports	Toyota
6	4	John Hunter Nemechek	Kyle Busch Motorsports	Toyota
7	66	Ty Majeski	ThorSport Racing	Toyota
8	1	Hailie Deegan	David Gilliland Racing	Ford
9	17	Todd Gilliland (i)	David Gilliland Racing	Ford
10	18	Chandler Smith	Kyle Busch Motorsports	Toyota
11	23	Grant Enfinger	GMS Racing	Chevrolet
12	25	Matt DiBenedetto	Rackley W.A.R.	Chevrolet
13	16	Tyler Ankrum	Hattori Racing Enterprises	Toyota
14	41	Tyler Carpenter	Niece Motorsports	Chevrolet
15	38	Zane Smith	Front Row Motorsports	Ford
16	15	Tanner Gray	David Gilliland Racing	Ford
17	02	Kaz Grala	Young's Motorsports	Chevrolet
18	40	Dean Thompson (R)	Niece Motorsports	Chevrolet
19	62	Jessica Friesen	Halmar Friesen Racing	Toyota
20	98	Christian Eckes	ThorSport Racing	Toyota
21	88	Matt Crafton	ThorSport Racing	Toyota
22	91	Colby Howard	McAnally–Hilgemann Racing	Chevrolet
23	22	Brett Moffitt (i)	AM Racing	Chevrolet
24	30	Joey Gase (i)	On Point Motorsports	Toyota
25	44	Kris Wright	Niece Motorsports	Chevrolet
26	46	Bryson Mitchell	G2G Racing	Toyota
27	61	Chase Purdy	Hattori Racing Enterprises	Toyota
28	56	Timmy Hill	Hill Motorsports	Chevrolet
29	20	Thad Moffitt	Young's Motorsports	Chevrolet
30	3	Dylan Westbrook	Jordan Anderson Racing	Chevrolet
31	33	Brayton Laster	Reaume Brothers Racing	Chevrolet
Qualified by owner's points
32	9	Blaine Perkins (R)	CR7 Motorsports	Chevrolet
33	43	Devon Rouse	Reaume Brothers Racing	Chevrolet
34	45	Lawless Alan (R)	Niece Motorsports	Chevrolet
35	12	Spencer Boyd	Young's Motorsports	Chevrolet
36	24	Jack Wood (R)	GMS Racing	Chevrolet
Failed to qualify
37	53	Braden Mitchell	Sparks Motorsports	Chevrolet
38	6	Norm Benning	Norm Benning Racing	Chevrolet
Official starting lineup

== Race results ==
Stage 1 Laps: 40

Pos.	#	Driver	Team	Make	Pts
1	42	Carson Hocevar	Niece Motorsports	Chevrolet	10
2	17	Todd Gilliland (i)	David Gilliland Racing	Ford	0
3	4	John Hunter Nemechek	Kyle Busch Motorsports	Toyota	8
4	19	Derek Kraus	McAnally–Hilgemann Racing	Chevrolet	7
5	66	Ty Majeski	ThorSport Racing	Toyota	6
6	23	Grant Enfinger	GMS Racing	Chevrolet	5
7	18	Chandler Smith	Kyle Busch Motorsports	Toyota	4
8	22	Brett Moffitt (i)	AM Racing	Chevrolet	0
9	25	Matt DiBenedetto	Rackley W.A.R.	Chevrolet	2
10	38	Zane Smith	Front Row Motorsports	Ford	1

Stage 2 Laps: 50

Pos.	#	Driver	Team	Make	Pts
1	17	Todd Gilliland (i)	David Gilliland Racing	Ford	0
2	38	Zane Smith	Front Row Motorsports	Ford	9
3	4	John Hunter Nemechek	Kyle Busch Motorsports	Toyota	8
4	22	Brett Moffitt (i)	AM Racing	Chevrolet	0
5	19	Derek Kraus	McAnally–Hilgemann Racing	Chevrolet	6
6	23	Grant Enfinger	GMS Racing	Chevrolet	5
7	02	Kaz Grala	Young's Motorsports	Chevrolet	4
8	52	Stewart Friesen	Halmar Friesen Racing	Toyota	3
9	88	Matt Crafton	ThorSport Racing	Toyota	2
10	16	Tyler Ankrum	Hattori Racing Enterprises	Toyota	1

Stage 3 Laps: 60

Fin.	St	#	Driver	Team	Make	Laps	Led	Status	Pts
1	9	17	Todd Gilliland (i)	David Gilliland Racing	Ford	150	58	Running	0
2	6	4	John Hunter Nemechek	Kyle Busch Motorsports	Toyota	150	17	Running	51
3	15	38	Zane Smith	Front Row Motorsports	Ford	150	0	Running	44
4	7	66	Ty Majeski	ThorSport Racing	Toyota	150	0	Running	39
5	4	52	Stewart Friesen	Halmar Friesen Racing	Toyota	150	0	Running	35
6	1	19	Derek Kraus	McAnally–Hilgemann Racing	Chevrolet	150	0	Running	44
7	21	88	Matt Crafton	ThorSport Racing	Toyota	150	0	Running	32
8	11	23	Grant Enfinger	GMS Racing	Chevrolet	150	10	Running	39
9	13	16	Tyler Ankrum	Hattori Racing Enterprises	Toyota	150	0	Running	29
10	3	99	Ben Rhodes	ThorSport Racing	Toyota	150	0	Running	27
11	5	51	Buddy Kofoid	Kyle Busch Motorsports	Toyota	150	0	Running	26
12	20	98	Christian Eckes	ThorSport Racing	Toyota	150	0	Running	25
13	10	18	Chandler Smith	Kyle Busch Motorsports	Toyota	150	0	Running	28
14	12	25	Matt DiBenedetto	Rackley W.A.R.	Chevrolet	150	0	Running	25
15	8	1	Hailie Deegan	David Gilliland Racing	Ford	150	0	Running	22
16	22	91	Colby Howard	McAnally–Hilgemann Racing	Chevrolet	150	0	Running	21
17	30	3	Dylan Westbrook	Jordan Anderson Racing	Chevrolet	150	0	Running	20
18	34	45	Lawless Alan (R)	Niece Motorsports	Chevrolet	150	0	Running	19
19	28	56	Timmy Hill	Hill Motorsports	Toyota	150	0	Running	18
20	27	61	Chase Purdy	Hattori Racing Enterprises	Toyota	150	0	Running	17
21	36	24	Jack Wood (R)	GMS Racing	Chevrolet	149	0	Running	16
22	16	15	Tanner Gray	David Gilliland Racing	Ford	149	0	Running	15
23	18	40	Dean Thompson (R)	Niece Motorsports	Chevrolet	148	0	Running	14
24	24	30	Joey Gase (i)	On Point Motorsports	Toyota	148	0	Running	0
25	32	9	Blaine Perkins (R)	CR7 Motorsports	Chevrolet	148	0	Running	12
26	17	02	Kaz Grala	Young's Motorsports	Chevrolet	148	0	Running	15
27	31	33	Brayton Laster	Reaume Brothers Racing	Chevrolet	147	0	Running	10
28	25	44	Kris Wright	Niece Motorsports	Chevrolet	145	0	Running	9
29	35	12	Spencer Boyd	Young's Motorsports	Chevrolet	142	0	Running	8
30	33	43	Devon Rouse	Reaume Brothers Racing	Chevrolet	140	0	Running	7
31	29	20	Thad Moffitt	Young's Motorsports	Chevrolet	139	0	Running	6
32	23	22	Brett Moffitt (i)	AM Racing	Chevrolet	124	0	Accident	0
33	26	46	Bryson Mitchell	G2G Racing	Toyota	110	0	Throttle	4
34	19	62	Jessica Friesen	Halmar Friesen Racing	Toyota	76	0	Brakes	3
35	2	42	Carson Hocevar	Niece Motorsports	Chevrolet	66	65	Engine	12
36	14	41	Tyler Carpenter	Niece Motorsports	Chevrolet	65	0	Driveshaft	1
Official race results

== Standings after the race ==
Drivers' Championship standings

Pos	Driver	Points
1	John Hunter Nemechek	481
2	Zane Smith	476 (-5)
3	Ben Rhodes	471 (-10)
4	Chandler Smith	467 (-14)
5	Ty Majeski	438 (-43)
6	Stewart Friesen	432 (-49)
7	Christian Eckes	408 (-73)
8	Carson Hocevar	386 (-95)
9	Grant Enfinger	383 (-98)
10	Matt Crafton	352 (-129)
Official driver's standings

- Note: Only the first 10 positions are included for the driver standings.

Previous race: 2022 DoorDash 250	NASCAR Camping World Truck Series; 2022 season	Next race: 2022 Rackley Roofing 200
