= 2025 Coca-Cola 600 =

NASCAR Cup Series race

Race details
- Race 13 of 36 in the 2025 NASCAR Cup Series
- Date: May 25, 2025
- Location: Charlotte Motor Speedway in Concord, North Carolina, U.S.
- Course: Permanent racing facility
- Course length: 1.5 miles (2.4 km)
- Distance: 400 laps, 600 mi (965.6 km)
- Average speed: 135.781 miles per hour (218.518 km/h)

Pole position
Driver	Chase Briscoe	Joe Gibbs Racing
- Time: 29.532

Most laps led
Driver	William Byron	Hendrick Motorsports
- Laps: 283

Fastest lap
Driver	Denny Hamlin	Joe Gibbs Racing
- Time: 29.367

Winner
No. 1	Ross Chastain	Trackhouse Racing

Television in the United States
- Network: Prime Video
- Announcers: Adam Alexander, Dale Earnhardt Jr., Steve Letarte, and Jeff Gordon (stages 2–3)
- Nielsen ratings: 2.6 million

Radio in the United States
- Radio: PRN
- Booth announcers: Brad Gillie and Mark Garrow
- Turn announcers: Rob Albright (1 & 2) and Pat Patterson (3 & 4)

The 2025 Coca-Cola 600 was a NASCAR Cup Series race held on May 25, 2025, at Charlotte Motor Speedway in Concord, North Carolina and the 66th running of the event. It was contested over 400 laps on the 1.5-mile (2.4 km) asphalt speedway, it was the 13th race of the 2025 NASCAR Cup Series season, as well as the second of the four crown jewel races.

Kyle Larson attempted a Double Duty, racing in the 2025 Indianapolis 500 and Coca-Cola 600 on the same day. It is his second attempt after failing to succeed in 2024, as last year's Coca-Cola 600 was called for rain. Larson crashed 91 laps into the Indianapolis 500, which allowed him to leave Indianapolis early and reach Charlotte in time.

Ross Chastain won the race. William Byron, after dominating most of the night, leading 283 laps and sweeping the 3 stages, finished 2nd, and Chase Briscoe finished 3rd. A. J. Allmendinger and Brad Keselowski rounded out the top five, and Chase Elliott, Michael McDowell, Christopher Bell, Ryan Preece, and Noah Gragson rounded out the top ten.

Chastain made history with his win, after starting from 40th position. He set the record for the lowest starting position of an eventual winner in the history of the Coca-Cola 600, as well as in the history of Charlotte Motor Speedway.

== Report ==
=== Background ===
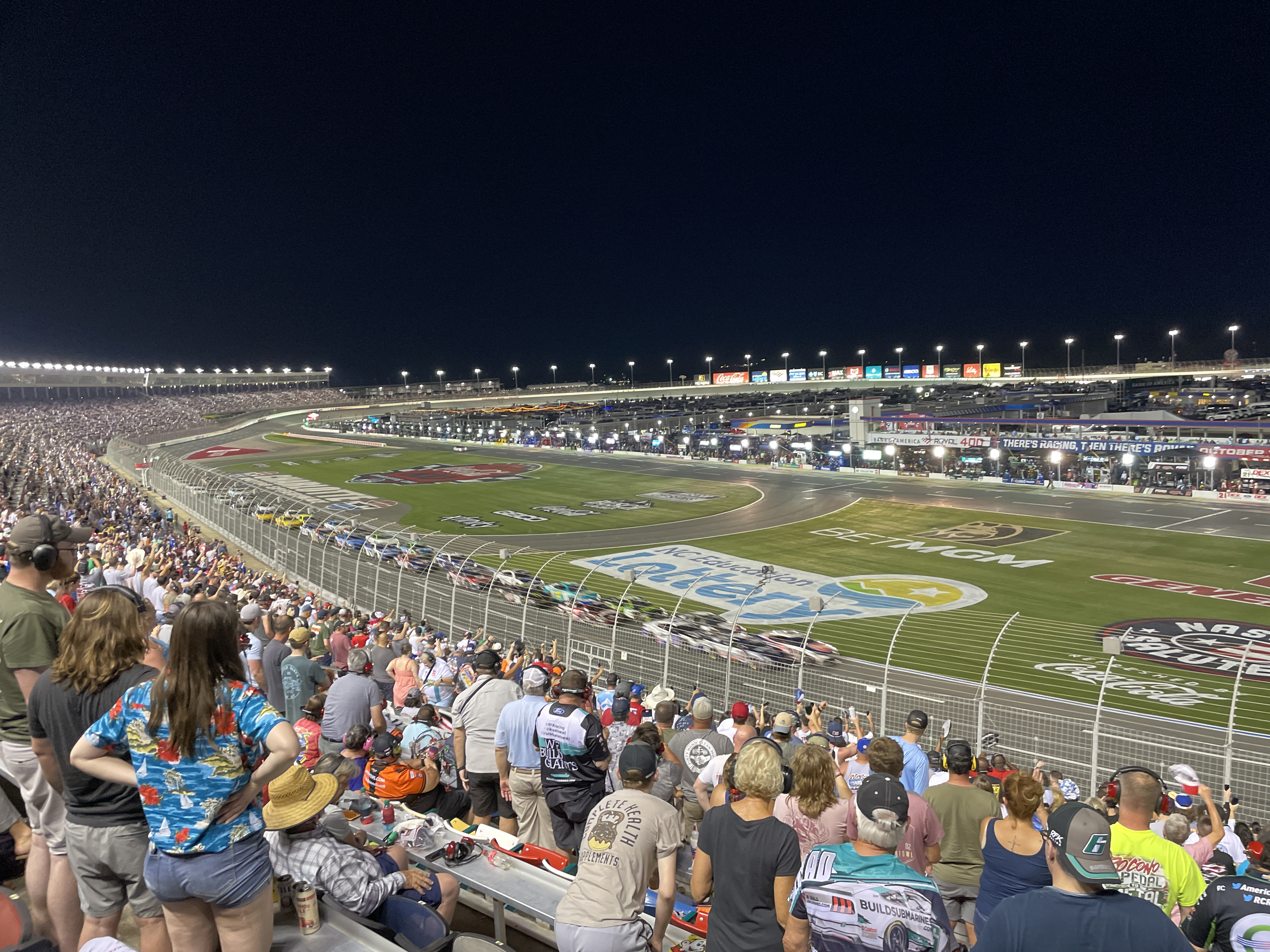
Charlotte Motor Speedway, the track where the race was held.

The race was held at Charlotte Motor Speedway, located in Concord, North Carolina. The speedway complex includes a 1.5-mile (2.4 km) quad-oval track that was utilized for the race, as well as a dragstrip and a dirt track. The speedway was built in 1959 by Bruton Smith and is considered the home track for NASCAR with many race teams based in the Charlotte metropolitan area. The track is owned and operated by Speedway Motorsports Inc. (SMI) with Marcus G. Smith serving as track president.

==== Entry list ====
- (R) denotes rookie driver.
- (i) denotes driver who is ineligible for series driver points.

No.	Driver	Team	Manufacturer	"600 Miles of Remembrance"
1	Ross Chastain	Trackhouse Racing	Chevrolet	Kevin M. McCrea
2	Austin Cindric	Team Penske	Ford	Kenneth V. Welch
3	Austin Dillon	Richard Childress Racing	Chevrolet	Sean Gregory Landrus
4	Noah Gragson	Front Row Motorsports	Ford	Jose J. Gonzalez
5	Kyle Larson	Hendrick Motorsports	Chevrolet	Sara M. Knutson Cullen
6	Brad Keselowski	RFK Racing	Ford	Kenneth E. Clodfelter
7	Justin Haley	Spire Motorsports	Chevrolet	Bobby C. Franklin
8	Kyle Busch	Richard Childress Racing	Chevrolet	Jeffrey M. Svoboda "Boda"
9	Chase Elliott	Hendrick Motorsports	Chevrolet	Richard J. Feehery
10	Ty Dillon	Kaulig Racing	Chevrolet	Eric M. Finninginam "Finn"
11	Denny Hamlin	Joe Gibbs Racing	Toyota	Timothy D. McNeely
12	Ryan Blaney	Team Penske	Ford	Robert M. Carr
16	A. J. Allmendinger	Kaulig Racing	Chevrolet	Nicole Leeann Gee
17	Chris Buescher	RFK Racing	Ford	Stephen Roy Dwyer
19	Chase Briscoe	Joe Gibbs Racing	Toyota	Alan W. Shaw
20	Christopher Bell	Joe Gibbs Racing	Toyota	Joshua Wheeler
21	Josh Berry	Wood Brothers Racing	Ford	Ian Thomas Zook
22	Joey Logano	Team Penske	Ford	Thomas W. Myers
23	Bubba Wallace	23XI Racing	Toyota	David "DG" Gray
24	William Byron	Hendrick Motorsports	Chevrolet	Gary Dwight Barbee
34	Todd Gilliland	Front Row Motorsports	Ford	Robert Secher
35	Riley Herbst (R)	23XI Racing	Toyota	Edward James Jacobs, Jr.
38	Zane Smith	Front Row Motorsports	Ford	Keaton Grant Coffey
41	Cole Custer	Haas Factory Team	Ford	Ronald W. Forrester
42	John Hunter Nemechek	Legacy Motor Club	Toyota	Walter Ray Thetford
43	Erik Jones	Legacy Motor Club	Toyota	Justin R. Whiting
44	Derek Kraus	NY Racing Team	Chevrolet	Brett Gornewicz
45	Tyler Reddick	23XI Racing	Toyota	Carl Edward "Eddie" McGee Jr.
47	Ricky Stenhouse Jr.	Hyak Motorsports	Chevrolet	Andrew W. Nowacki
48	Alex Bowman	Hendrick Motorsports	Chevrolet	Michael Richard Kempel
51	Cody Ware	Rick Ware Racing	Ford	Juantrea Tyrone Bradley Sr.
54	Ty Gibbs	Joe Gibbs Racing	Toyota	Joshua Byers
60	Ryan Preece	RFK Racing	Ford	Robert "Robbie" John Naundorff Jr.
66	Josh Bilicki (i)	Garage 66	Ford	Kevin M. Jones
71	Michael McDowell	Spire Motorsports	Chevrolet	James A. Waters
77	Carson Hocevar	Spire Motorsports	Chevrolet	Michelle Young
84	Jimmie Johnson	Legacy Motor Club	Toyota	Matthew Robert Davis
87	Connor Zilisch (i)	Trackhouse Racing	Chevrolet	Scott E. Duffman
88	Shane van Gisbergen (R)	Trackhouse Racing	Chevrolet	Jacob S. Schmuecker
99	Daniel Suárez	Trackhouse Racing	Chevrolet	Reynold Armand
Official entry list

== Practice ==
Carson Hocevar was the fastest in the practice session with a time of 29.926 seconds and a speed of 180.445 mph (290.398 km/h).

=== Practice results ===
Pos	No.	Driver	Team	Manufacturer	Time	Speed
1	77	Carson Hocevar	Spire Motorsports	Chevrolet	29.926	180.445
2	54	Ty Gibbs	Joe Gibbs Racing	Toyota	29.939	180.366
3	16	A. J. Allmendinger	Kaulig Racing	Chevrolet	30.115	179.312
Official practice results

== Qualifying ==
Chase Briscoe scored the pole for the race with a time of 29.532 and a speed of 182.852 mph (294.272 km/h).

=== Qualifying results ===
Pos	No.	Driver	Team	Manufacturer	Time	Speed
1	19	Chase Briscoe	Joe Gibbs Racing	Toyota	29.532	182.852
2	5	Kyle Larson	Hendrick Motorsports	Chevrolet	29.552	182.729
3	24	William Byron	Hendrick Motorsports	Chevrolet	29.566	182.642
4	17	Chris Buescher	RFK Racing	Ford	29.660	182.063
5	16	A. J. Allmendinger	Kaulig Racing	Chevrolet	29.684	181.916
6	42	John Hunter Nemechek	Legacy Motor Club	Toyota	29.725	181.665
7	54	Ty Gibbs	Joe Gibbs Racing	Toyota	29.747	181.531
8	4	Noah Gragson	Front Row Motorsports	Ford	29.809	181.153
9	48	Alex Bowman	Hendrick Motorsports	Chevrolet	29.814	181.123
10	20	Christopher Bell	Joe Gibbs Racing	Toyota	29.815	181.117
11	47	Ricky Stenhouse Jr.	Hyak Motorsports	Chevrolet	29.847	180.923
12	45	Tyler Reddick	23XI Racing	Toyota	29.850	180.905
13	7	Justin Haley	Spire Motorsports	Chevrolet	29.856	180.868
14	2	Austin Cindric	Team Penske	Ford	29.871	180.777
15	71	Michael McDowell	Spire Motorsports	Chevrolet	29.897	180.620
16	22	Joey Logano	Team Penske	Ford	29.916	180.505
17	84	Jimmie Johnson	Legacy Motor Club	Toyota	29.926	180.445
18	21	Josh Berry	Wood Brothers Racing	Ford	29.970	180.180
19	10	Ty Dillon	Kaulig Racing	Chevrolet	29.988	180.072
20	11	Denny Hamlin	Joe Gibbs Racing	Toyota	30.022	179.868
21	12	Ryan Blaney	Team Penske	Ford	30.029	179.826
22	9	Chase Elliott	Hendrick Motorsports	Chevrolet	30.037	179.778
23	38	Zane Smith	Front Row Motorsports	Ford	30.039	179.766
24	8	Kyle Busch	Richard Childress Racing	Chevrolet	30.043	179.742
25	99	Daniel Suárez	Trackhouse Racing	Chevrolet	30.063	179.623
26	3	Austin Dillon	Richard Childress Racing	Chevrolet	30.084	179.497
27	43	Erik Jones	Legacy Motor Club	Toyota	30.100	179.402
28	60	Ryan Preece	RFK Racing	Ford	30.114	179.319
29	41	Cole Custer	Haas Factory Team	Ford	30.147	179.122
30	88	Shane van Gisbergen (R)	Trackhouse Racing	Chevrolet	30.161	179.039
31	35	Riley Herbst (R)	23XI Racing	Toyota	30.222	178.678
32	23	Bubba Wallace	23XI Racing	Toyota	30.277	178.353
33	87	Connor Zilisch (i)	Trackhouse Racing	Chevrolet	30.304	178.194
34	34	Todd Gilliland	Front Row Motorsports	Ford	30.314	178.136
35	6	Brad Keselowski	RFK Racing	Ford	30.314	178.136
36	51	Cody Ware	Rick Ware Racing	Ford	30.683	175.993
37	44	Derek Kraus	NY Racing Team	Chevrolet	31.427	171.827
38	66	Josh Bilicki (i)	Garage 66	Ford	32.261	167.385
39	77	Carson Hocevar	Spire Motorsports	Chevrolet	36.144	149.402
40	1	Ross Chastain	Trackhouse Racing	Chevrolet	0.000	0.000
Official qualifying results

== Race ==
=== Race results ===
==== Stage results ====
Stage One Laps: 100

Pos	No	Driver	Team	Manufacturer	Points
1	24	William Byron	Hendrick Motorsports	Chevrolet	10
2	45	Tyler Reddick	23XI Racing	Toyota	9
3	20	Christopher Bell	Joe Gibbs Racing	Toyota	8
4	42	John Hunter Nemechek	Legacy Motor Club	Toyota	7
5	16	A. J. Allmendinger	Kaulig Racing	Chevrolet	6
6	17	Chris Buescher	RFK Racing	Ford	5
7	11	Denny Hamlin	Joe Gibbs Racing	Toyota	4
8	4	Noah Gragson	Front Row Motorsports	Ford	3
9	9	Chase Elliott	Hendrick Motorsports	Chevrolet	2
10	71	Michael McDowell	Spire Motorsports	Chevrolet	1
Official stage one results

Stage Two Laps: 100

Pos	No	Driver	Team	Manufacturer	Points
1	24	William Byron	Hendrick Motorsports	Chevrolet	10
2	11	Denny Hamlin	Joe Gibbs Racing	Toyota	9
3	45	Tyler Reddick	23XI Racing	Toyota	8
4	77	Carson Hocevar	Spire Motorsports	Chevrolet	7
5	42	John Hunter Nemechek	Legacy Motor Club	Toyota	6
6	16	A. J. Allmendinger	Kaulig Racing	Chevrolet	5
7	1	Ross Chastain	Trackhouse Racing	Chevrolet	4
8	43	Erik Jones	Legacy Motor Club	Toyota	3
9	4	Noah Gragson	Front Row Motorsports	Ford	2
10	9	Chase Elliott	Hendrick Motorsports	Chevrolet	1
Official stage two results

Stage Three Laps: 100

Pos	No	Driver	Team	Manufacturer	Points
1	24	William Byron	Hendrick Motorsports	Chevrolet	10
2	11	Denny Hamlin	Joe Gibbs Racing	Toyota	9
3	77	Carson Hocevar	Spire Motorsports	Chevrolet	8
4	45	Tyler Reddick	23XI Racing	Toyota	7
5	1	Ross Chastain	Trackhouse Racing	Chevrolet	6
6	16	A. J. Allmendinger	Kaulig Racing	Chevrolet	5
7	20	Christopher Bell	Joe Gibbs Racing	Toyota	4
8	9	Chase Elliott	Hendrick Motorsports	Chevrolet	3
9	19	Chase Briscoe	Joe Gibbs Racing	Toyota	2
10	60	Ryan Preece	RFK Racing	Ford	1
Official stage three results

=== Final Stage results ===
Stage Four Laps: 100

Pos	Grid	No	Driver	Team	Manufacturer	Laps	Points
1	40	1	Ross Chastain	Trackhouse Racing	Chevrolet	400	50
2	3	24	William Byron	Hendrick Motorsports	Chevrolet	400	65
3	1	19	Chase Briscoe	Joe Gibbs Racing	Toyota	400	36
4	5	16	A. J. Allmendinger	Kaulig Racing	Chevrolet	400	49
5	35	6	Brad Keselowski	RFK Racing	Ford	400	32
6	22	9	Chase Elliott	Hendrick Motorsports	Chevrolet	400	37
7	15	71	Michael McDowell	Spire Motorsports	Chevrolet	400	31
8	10	20	Christopher Bell	Joe Gibbs Racing	Toyota	400	41
9	28	60	Ryan Preece	RFK Racing	Ford	400	29
10	8	4	Noah Gragson	Front Row Motorsports	Ford	400	32
11	11	47	Ricky Stenhouse Jr.	Hyak Motorsports	Chevrolet	400	26
12	18	21	Josh Berry	Wood Brothers Racing	Ford	400	25
13	27	43	Erik Jones	Legacy Motor Club	Toyota	400	27
14	30	88	Shane van Gisbergen (R)	Trackhouse Racing	Chevrolet	400	23
15	24	8	Kyle Busch	Richard Childress Racing	Chevrolet	400	22
16	20	11	Denny Hamlin	Joe Gibbs Racing	Toyota	400	44
17	16	22	Joey Logano	Team Penske	Ford	400	20
18	34	34	Todd Gilliland	Front Row Motorsports	Ford	399	19
19	19	10	Ty Dillon	Kaulig Racing	Chevrolet	399	18
20	26	3	Austin Dillon	Richard Childress Racing	Chevrolet	399	17
21	29	41	Cole Custer	Haas Factory Team	Ford	398	16
22	4	17	Chris Buescher	RFK Racing	Ford	398	20
23	33	87	Connor Zilisch (i)	Trackhouse Racing	Chevrolet	398	0
24	7	54	Ty Gibbs	Joe Gibbs Racing	Toyota	398	13
25	36	51	Cody Ware	Rick Ware Racing	Ford	398	12
26	12	45	Tyler Reddick	23XI Racing	Toyota	398	35
27	6	42	John Hunter Nemechek	Legacy Motor Club	Toyota	398	23
28	31	35	Riley Herbst (R)	23XI Racing	Toyota	397	9
29	9	48	Alex Bowman	Hendrick Motorsports	Chevrolet	397	8
30	13	7	Justin Haley	Spire Motorsports	Chevrolet	395	7
31	14	2	Austin Cindric	Team Penske	Ford	388	6
32	37	44	Derek Kraus	NY Racing Team	Chevrolet	380	5
33	38	66	Josh Bilicki (i)	Garage 66	Ford	343	0
34	39	77	Carson Hocevar	Spire Motorsports	Chevrolet	306	18
35	32	23	Bubba Wallace	23XI Racing	Toyota	306	2
36	25	99	Daniel Suárez	Trackhouse Racing	Chevrolet	245	1
37	2	5	Kyle Larson	Hendrick Motorsports	Chevrolet	245	1
38	21	12	Ryan Blaney	Team Penske	Ford	245	1
39	23	38	Zane Smith	Front Row Motorsports	Ford	236	1
40	17	84	Jimmie Johnson	Legacy Motor Club	Toyota	111	1
Official race results

=== Race statistics ===
- Lead changes: 34 among 11 different drivers
- Cautions/Laps: 8 for 52
- Red flags: 0
- Time of race: 4 hours, 25 minutes, and 8 seconds
- Average speed: 135.781 miles per hour (218.518 km/h)

== Media ==
=== Television ===
Prime Video covered the race on the television side, Prime's first televised NASCAR race. Adam Alexander, Dale Earnhardt Jr. and Steve Letarte called the race from the broadcast booth. Jeff Gordon joined the booth for Stages 2 & 3. Kim Coon, Marty Snider, and Trevor Bayne handled pit road for the television side.

Prime Video
Booth announcers	Pit reporters
Lap-by-lap: Adam Alexander; Color-commentator: Dale Earnhardt Jr. Color-commentator: Steve Letarte; Color-commentator: Jeff Gordon (stage 2–3)	Kim Coon; Marty Snider; Trevor Bayne

=== Radio ===
Radio coverage of the race was broadcast by the Performance Racing Network (PRN), and was also simulcasted on Sirius XM NASCAR Radio. Brad Gillie and Mark Garrow called the race in the booth when the field raced through the quad-oval. Rob Albright called the race from a billboard in turn 2 when the field would race through turns 1 and 2 and halfway down the backstretch. Pat Patterson called the race from a billboard outside of turn 3 when the field would race through the other half of the backstretch and through turns 3 and 4. Wendy Venturini, Brett McMillan, and Alan Cavanna were the pit reporters during the broadcast.

PRN Radio
Booth announcers	Turn announcers	Pit reporters
Lead announcer: Brad Gillie; Announcer: Mark Garrow	Turns 1 & 2: Rob Albright; Turns 3 & 4: Pat Patterson	Wendy Venturini; Brett McMillan; Alan Cavanna

== Standings after the race ==
Drivers' Championship standings

	Pos	Driver	Points
1	1	William Byron	499
1	2	Kyle Larson	470 (–29)
	3	Christopher Bell	425 (–74)
	4	Chase Elliott	415 (–84)
1	5	Tyler Reddick	392 (–107)
1	6	Denny Hamlin	390 (–109)
2	7	Ryan Blaney	363 (–136)
3	8	Ross Chastain	350 (–149)
	9	Joey Logano	338 (–161)
2	10	Alex Bowman	333 (–166)
1	11	Chase Briscoe	314 (–185)
2	12	Bubba Wallace	312 (–187)
1	13	Ricky Stenhouse Jr.	284 (–215)
1	14	Ryan Preece	280 (–219)
2	15	Austin Cindric	279 (–220)
	16	Josh Berry	269 (–230)
Official driver's standings

Manufacturers' Championship standings

Pos	Manufacturer	Points
1	Chevrolet	477
2	Toyota	459 (–18)
3	Ford	437 (–40)

- Note: Only the first 16 positions are included for the driver standings.
- . – Driver has clinched a position in the NASCAR Cup Series playoffs.

Previous race: 2025 AdventHealth 400 (points); 2025 NASCAR All-Star Race (exhibition)	NASCAR Cup Series; 2025 season	Next race: 2025 Cracker Barrel 400
