= Derek Kraus =

American racing driver (born 2001)

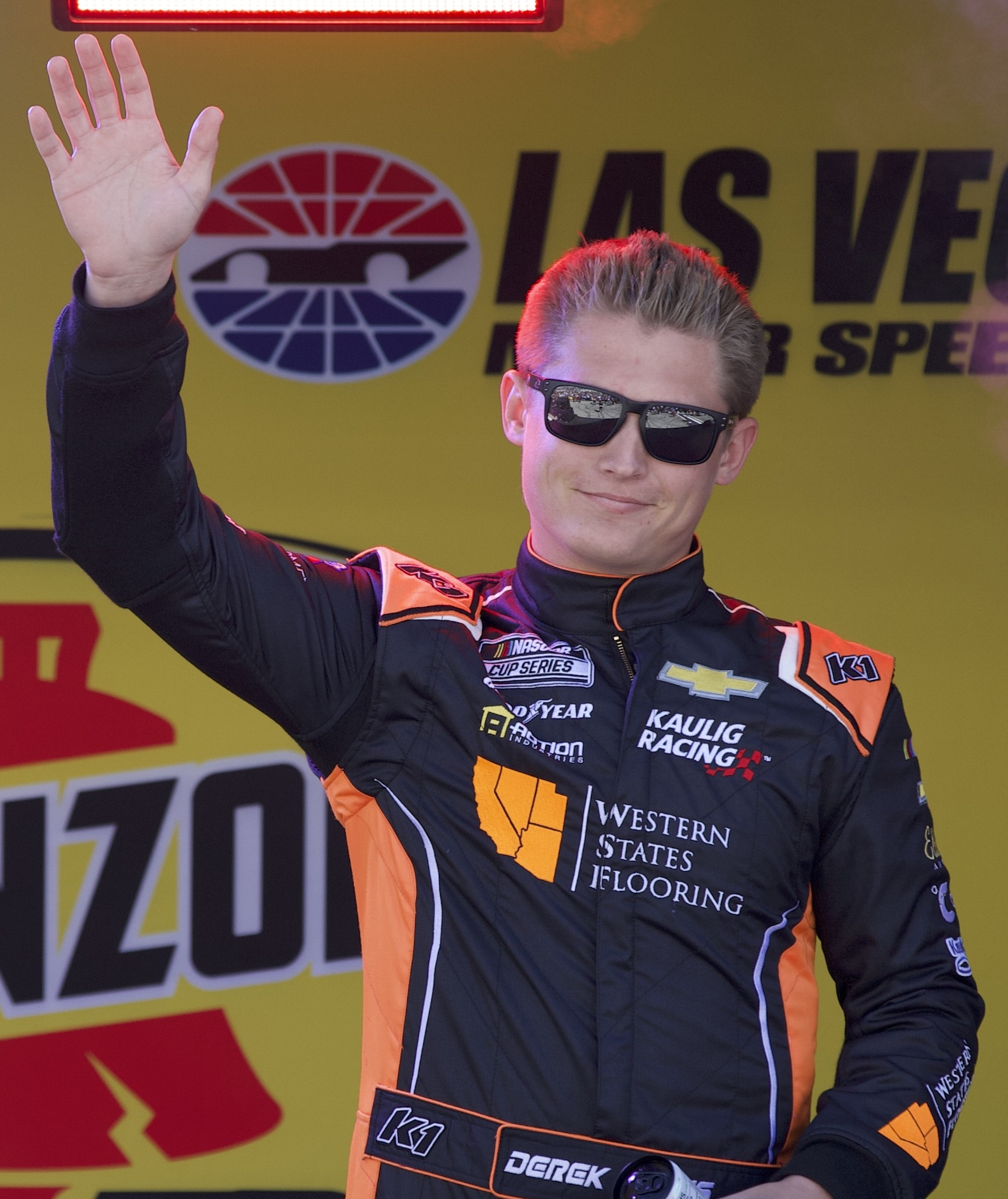
- Kraus at Las Vegas Motor Speedway in 2024
- Born: Derek Kenneth Kraus; September 1, 2001 (age 25); Stratford, Wisconsin, U.S.
- Achievements: 2019 NASCAR K&N Pro Series West Champion
- Awards: 2017 NASCAR K&N Pro Series West Rookie of the Year

NASCAR Cup Series career
- 8 races run over 2 years
- 2025 position: 39th
- Best finish: 38th (2024)
- First race: 2024 Pennzoil 400 (Las Vegas)
- Last race: 2025 Cook Out Southern 500 (Darlington)
Wins	Top tens	Poles
0	0	0

NASCAR O'Reilly Auto Parts Series career
- 8 races run over 1 year
- 2023 position: 85th
- Best finish: 85th (2023)
- First race: 2023 ToyotaCare 250 (Richmond)
- Last race: 2023 NASCAR Xfinity Series Championship Race (Phoenix)
Wins	Top tens	Poles
0	3	0

NASCAR FedEx Freight Truck Series career
- 76 races run over 6 years
- 2023 position: 72nd
- Best finish: 11th (2020, 2022)
- First race: 2018 Lucas Oil 150 (Phoenix)
- Last race: 2023 Craftsman 150 (Phoenix)
Wins	Top tens	Poles
0	27	4

ARCA Menards Series career
- 2 races run over 2 years
- Best finish: 75th (2021)
- First race: 2021 General Tire 150 (Phoenix)
- Last race: 2022 General Tire 150 (Phoenix)
Wins	Top tens	Poles
0	2	0

ARCA Menards Series East career
- 18 races run over 3 years
- Best finish: 7th (2019)
- First race: 2017 Jet Tools 150 (New Smyrna)
- Last race: 2019 Monaco Cocktails Gateway Classic 125 (Gateway)
- First win: 2018 Monaco Gateway Classic (Gateway)
- Last win: 2019 Who'sYourDriver.org Twin 100's #2 (South Boston)
Wins	Top tens	Poles
3	15	2

ARCA Menards Series West career
- 45 races run over 6 years
- Best finish: 1st (2019)
- First race: 2017 NAPA Auto Parts Tucson 150 (Tucson)
- Last race: 2025 Desert Diamond Casino West Valley 100 (Phoenix)
- First win: 2017 West Coast Stock Car Hall of Fame 150 (Kern County)
- Last win: 2019 Napa/Eneos 150 (Kern County)
Wins	Top tens	Poles
10	35	8
- Statistics up to date as of November 6, 2025.

Derek Kenneth Kraus (born September 1, 2001) is an American professional stock car racing driver. He last competed part-time in the NASCAR Cup Series, driving the No. 44 Chevrolet Camaro ZL1 for NY Racing Team. He has also previously competed in the NASCAR Xfinity Series, NASCAR Craftsman Truck Series, ARCA Menards Series, and ARCA Menards Series East and West. He won the 2019 West Series championship (when the series was known as the NASCAR K&N Pro Series West) and is also a former NASCAR Next member. He is also a simulator driver for Kaulig Racing.

== Racing career ==
=== Early years ===
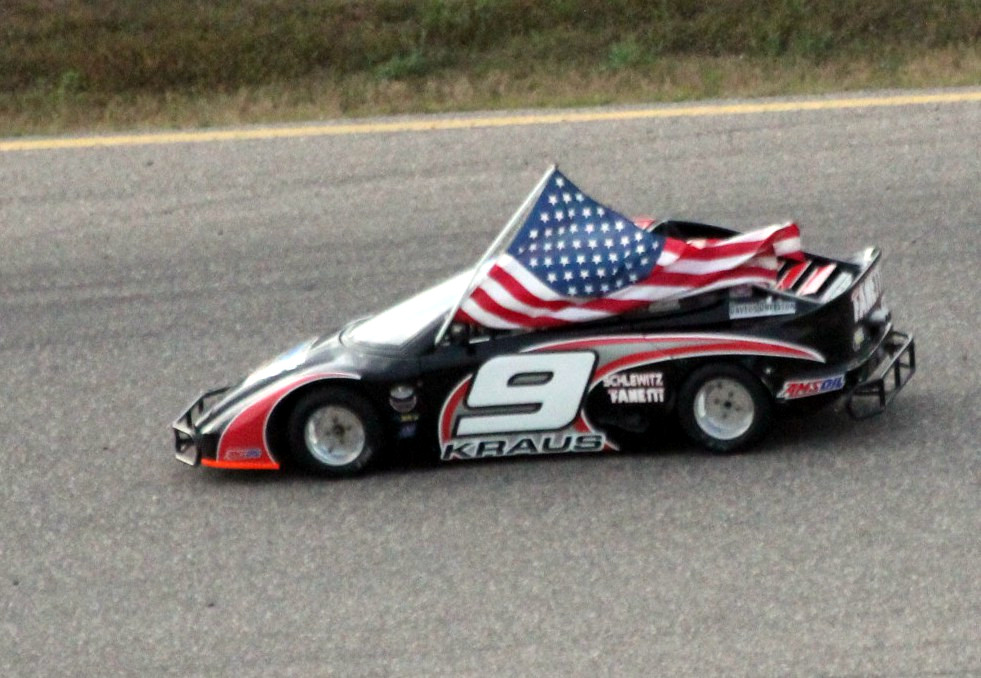
Kraus' 2013 Bandolero

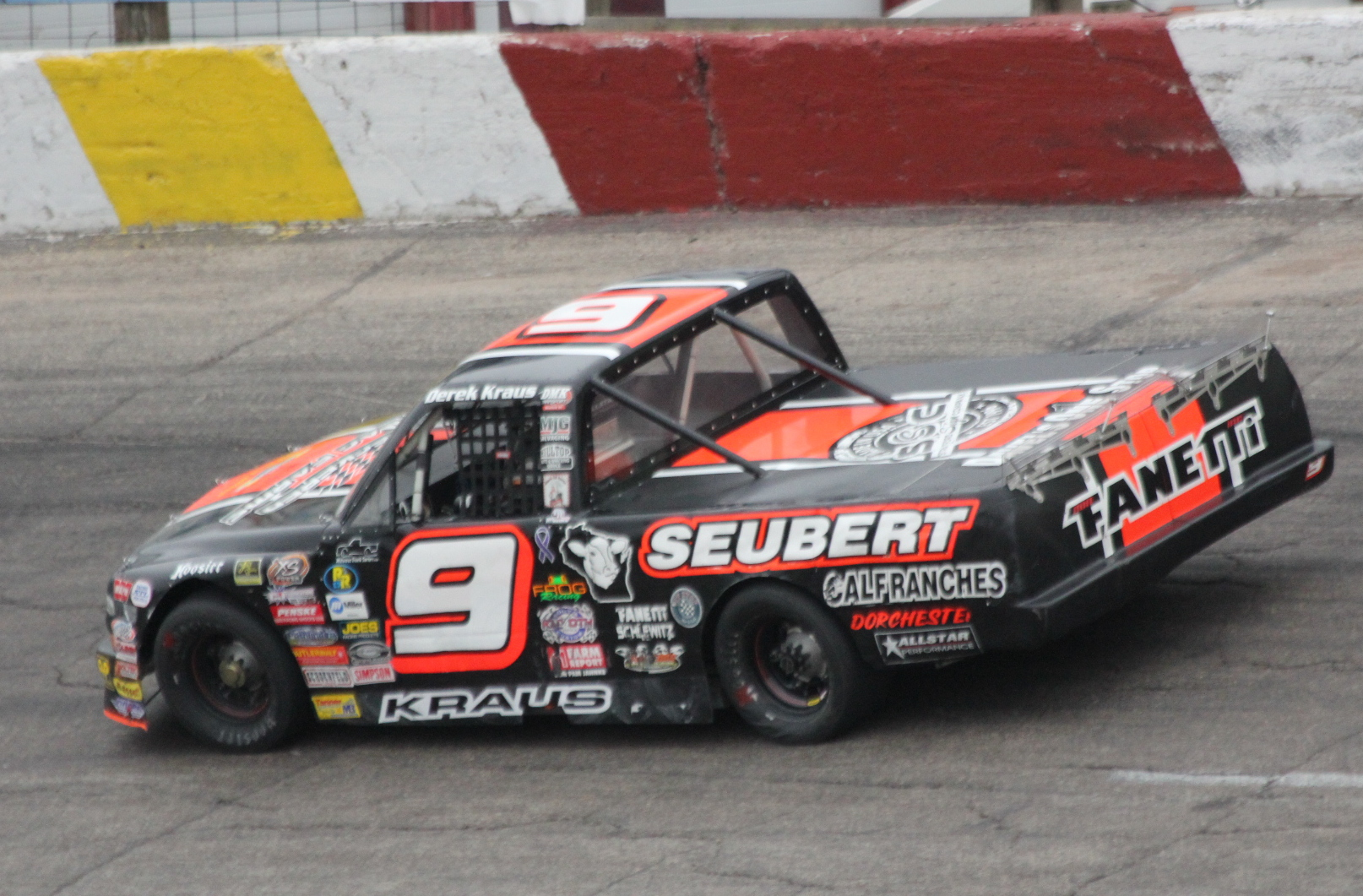
Kraus' 2015 ARCA Midwest Tour truck

Kraus started racing in go-karts and bandoleros. He won the GSR Kartway championship in 2012 and 2013. Kraus also competed in bandoleros at State Park Speedway in 2013 and won the track championship. In 2014, he won the State Park and state bandeleros championships. He later moved up to Midwest trucks and super late models (SLMs). He began the 2015 season by competing in seven Super Late Model races in Florida's New Smyrna Speedway. He began racing in the American Ethanol SuperTruck Series in 2015; he became the youngest driver to win a feature at Rockford Speedway at the age of thirteen. Additionally, Kraus won his first SLM race a few days before he turned fourteen. He also competed full-time in the Midwest Truck Series, he won that series' 2015 championship. In 2016, he competed in the ARCA Midwest Tour, finishing fourth in the standings and surpassing Matt Kenseth as the youngest driver to win a race in the series.

=== NASCAR ===
==== 2017: K&N Pro Series ====
In January 2017, it was announced that Kraus would drive full-time in the 2017 NASCAR K&N Pro Series West for Bill McAnally Racing (BMR), driving the team's No. 19 Toyota Camry. The announcement came after Kraus tested for the team at Kern County Raceway Park earlier that year.

Kraus made his debut for BMR in a NASCAR K&N Pro Series East race at New Smyrna Speedway in February, where he finished third. He set career-best finishes in the West Series of second at Kern County, Spokane County Raceway, and Colorado National Speedway. He won the pole at Iowa Speedway, his first combination race between the K&N Pro Series East and West. Kraus led for an extended period at Meridian Speedway in Idaho and won the season's final race at Kern County for his first win, beating teammate and series champion Todd Gilliland. He also won the K&N West Rookie of the Year award in 2017.

==== 2018: K&N contender, Truck debut ====
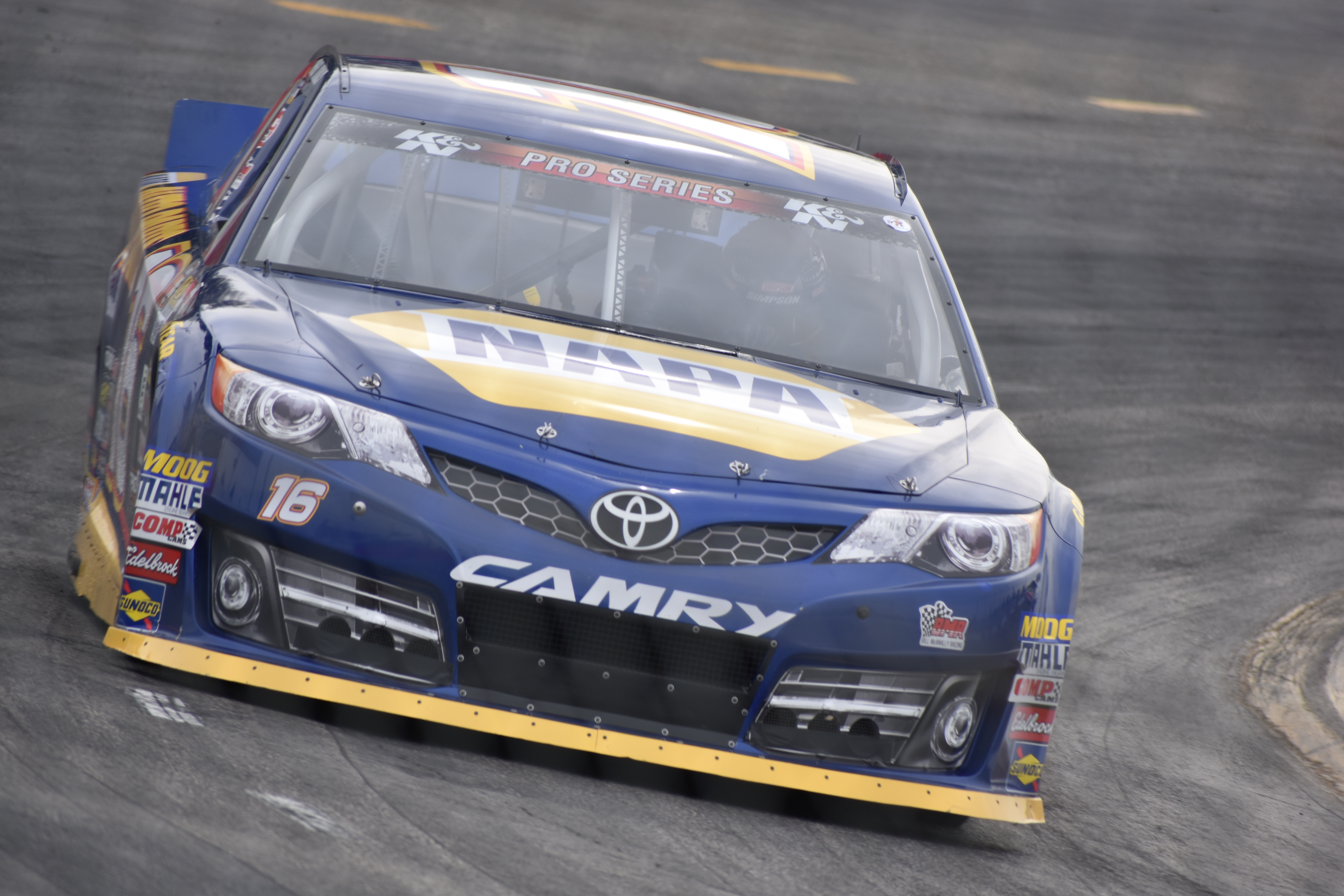
Kraus led the first 189 of 208 laps at the 2018 K&N West race at Meridian Speedway.

Kraus began 2018 by competing in the Winter Showdown late model race at Kern County. He won the season-opening 2018 K&N Pro Series West race at Kern County after making contact with race leader Kevin Harvick on the final restart, giving the lead to teammate Cole Rouse in the process. Kraus later passed the fellow BMR driver while both were running in lapped traffic, taking the win. Kraus then won the pole in both races at the series' doubleheader at Tucson Speedway, finishing fourth and eleventh in the first and second races respectively. In May 2018, Kraus was named to the 2018 NASCAR Next class. At Douglas County Speedway, Kraus won his third career race, leading teammate Hailie Deegan to a 1-2 finish for BMR. At Evergreen Speedway, Kraus won the pole and led a majority of the race but ran out of fuel in the closing stages of the race, losing to Derek Thorn. In the series' next race, a combination race with the NASCAR K&N Pro Series East at Gateway Motorsports Park, Kraus passed Rouse on the final restart to secure his third victory of the season. At the Las Vegas Motor Speedway Dirt Track, he led 31 laps but spun in the later stages and retired from the race, dropping to seventeenth in the classification order. At Meridian Speedway, Kraus led the first 189 laps before slowing to avoid a spinning lapped car in a late caution, leading to a third-place finish. For the final West race of the season, the tour returned to Kern County Raceway, and Kraus won after a late-race restart. He finished the season-long points tally in fourth, behind Thorn, Ryan Partridge and Rouse.

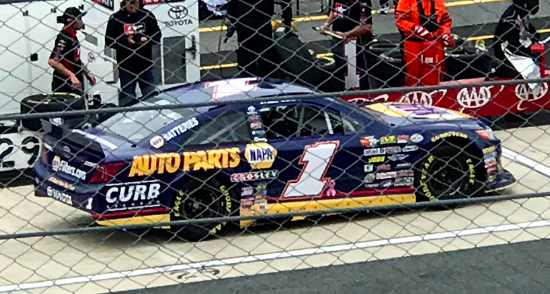
Kraus on pit road at Dover in 2018, where he finished third

Kraus' racing schedule with BMR expanded in 2018 to include a foray into the NASCAR K&N Pro Series East. After finishing fourth in the season opener at New Smyrna Speedway, Kraus finished 24th in the next race at Bristol Motor Speedway. He then won the pole at New Hampshire Motor Speedway in July. It was later announced that Kraus would join DGR-Crosley for the last two East races on the calendar. In his first race with DGR, he again claimed the pole at New Hampshire. Kraus raced against Brandon McReynolds for the lead on the final restart, finishing in second. He would end the season with a third-place finish in the season finale at Dover.

On November 6, 2018, Kraus announced that he would make his NASCAR Camping World Truck Series debut at ISM Raceway that Friday, driving the No. 19 Toyota Tundra for Bill McAnally Racing. He both qualified for and finished the race in the eighth position.

==== 2019: K&N championship, part-time in Trucks ====
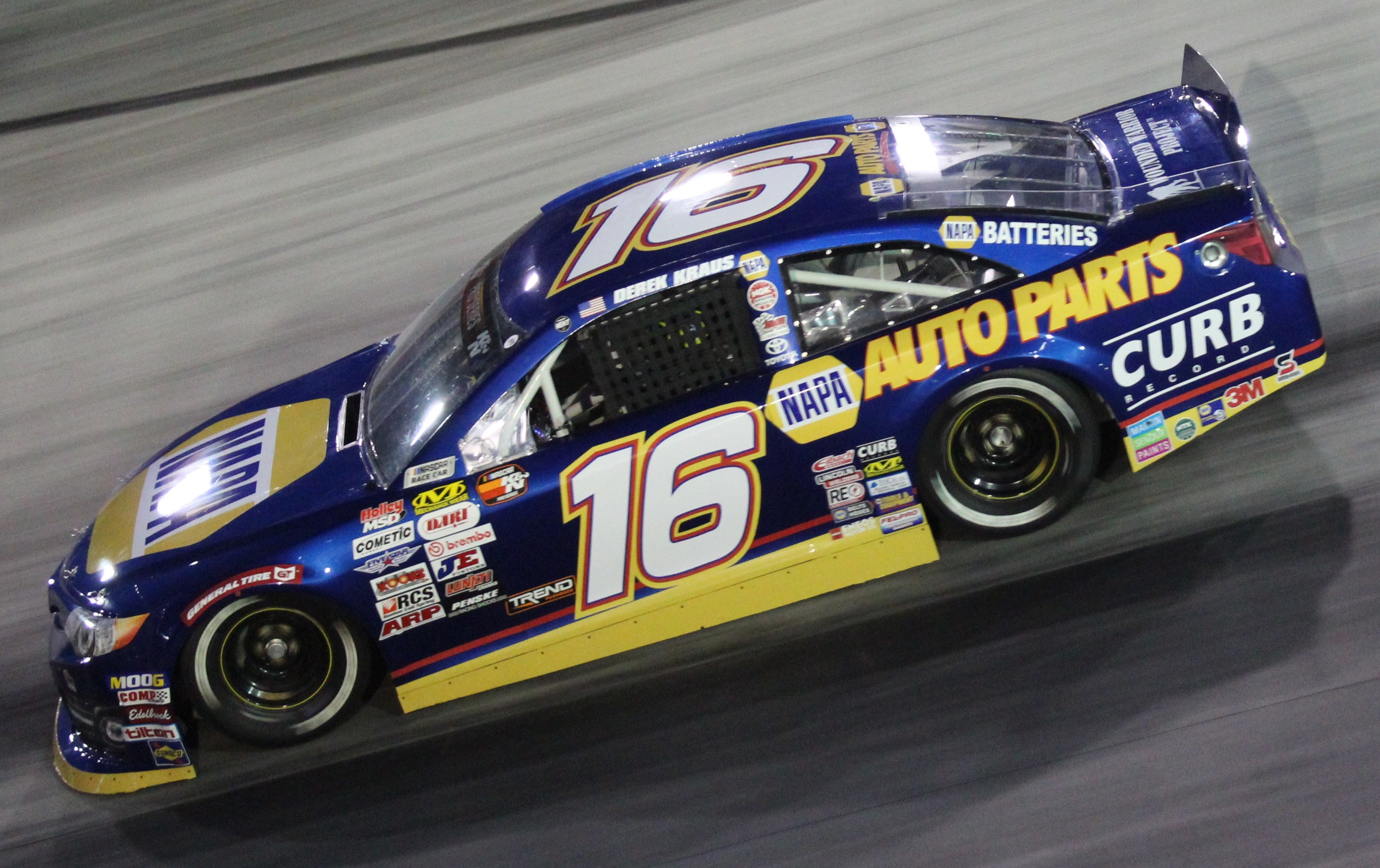
Kraus racing at Bristol in 2019

Kraus returned to BMR for a third West season in 2019. He also planned to run some K&N East races. Kraus began 2019 by winning the New Smyrna 175 K&N East race. After finishing sixth at Bristol, Kraus was three points out of the championship points lead. Addressing his unclear K&N East schedule, Kraus commented, "If we're leading, we're going to race three." Kraus competed in the third and fourth races in South Boston, winning the second race in the doubleheader. Kraus was leading the East Series championship in July, and team owner Bill McAnally reaffirmed the team's commitment to run full-time in the East as long as Kraus was at the top of the standings. After a ninth place finish at Watkins Glen International, Kraus and BMR were more than ten points out of the lead and subsequently withdrew from the second race at Bristol, conceding the East Series championship.

In the West Series, Kraus began the season at the Dirt Track at Las Vegas with a sixth-place finish. He qualified second and was leading the field until getting shuffled back with around 30 laps remaining. He later won both races at Tucson Speedway's doubleheader event, leading all 100 laps in the first race. At Colorado, Kraus ran up front until a broken sway bar hindered his car's performance, dropping him down to the back of the top-five. After returning to the lead, Deegan collided with him on the final lap, resulting in Kraus finishing eighth after having spun out. Before the next K&N West race at Sonoma, Kraus ran a one-off Trans-Am Series race at the California road course, a race in which he would go on to win the pole and score the overall victory. At Douglas County Speedway, Kraus won the pole and led every lap en route to the win. His next win of the season was at Meridian Speedway, where he led 100 laps after racing Jagger Jones for the victory throughout the event and colliding with him late in the race, spinning Jones out. Kraus won again by leading every lap from the pole at Kern County, his fourth straight victory at the track. Kraus' position in points enabled him to clinch the K&N West championship simply by starting the final race at ISM Raceway, where he finished third and was crowned champion of the series.

Kraus and BMR also re-upped for four Truck Series events in 2019, at Martinsville and Dover in the early portion of the season and Las Vegas and ISM in the latter portion of the season. After finishing eighteenth at Martinsville, he equalled his best finish for the series with an eighth at Dover. At Las Vegas, Kraus's truck had transmission problems, relegating him to a 27th-place finish. After winning the K&N West championship, BMR added a fifth Truck Series race for Kraus at Homestead-Miami Speedway.

==== 2020–2022: Full-time in the Truck Series ====
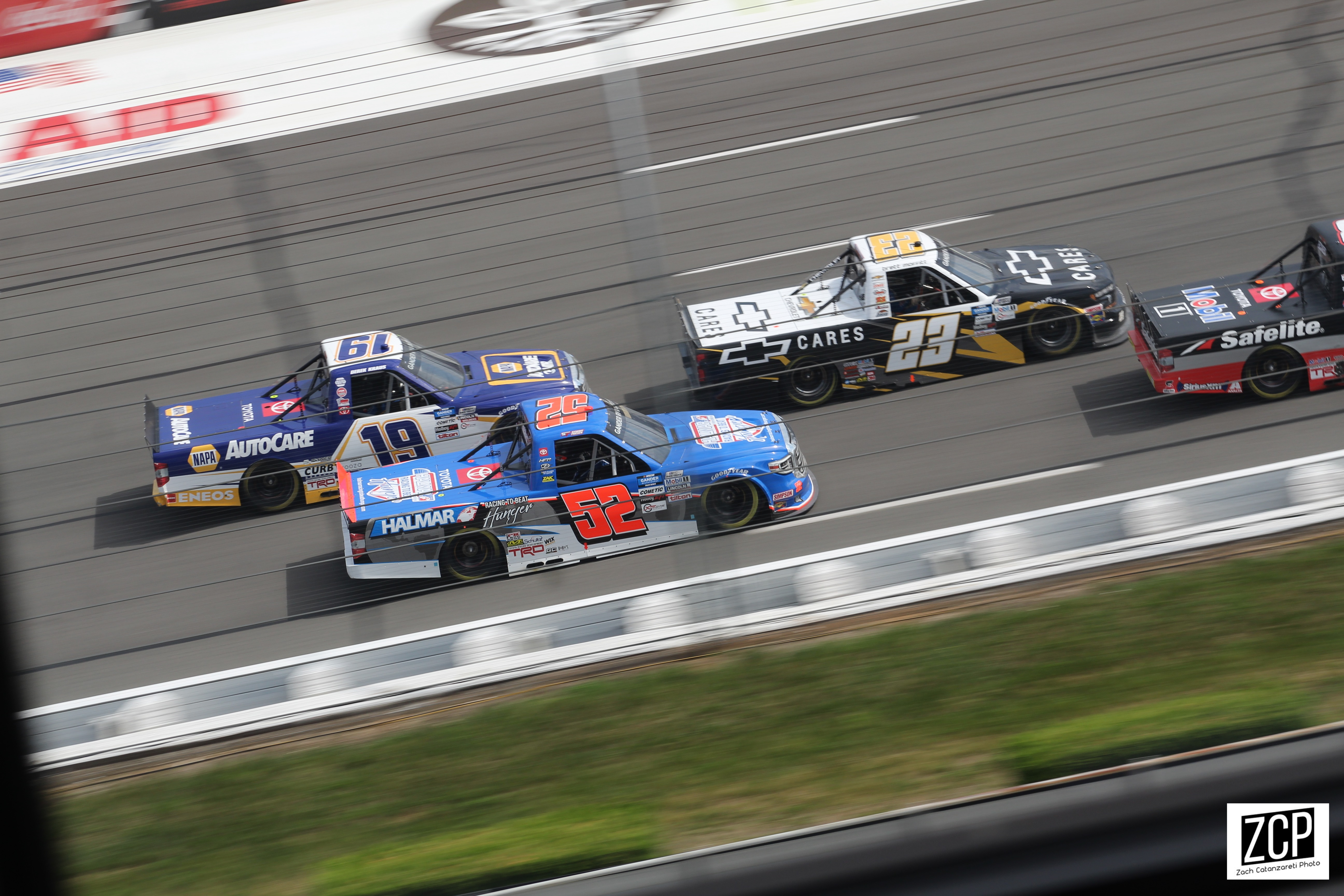
Kraus (No. 19) racing Stewart Friesen (No. 52) and Brett Moffitt (No. 23) at Pocono in 2020

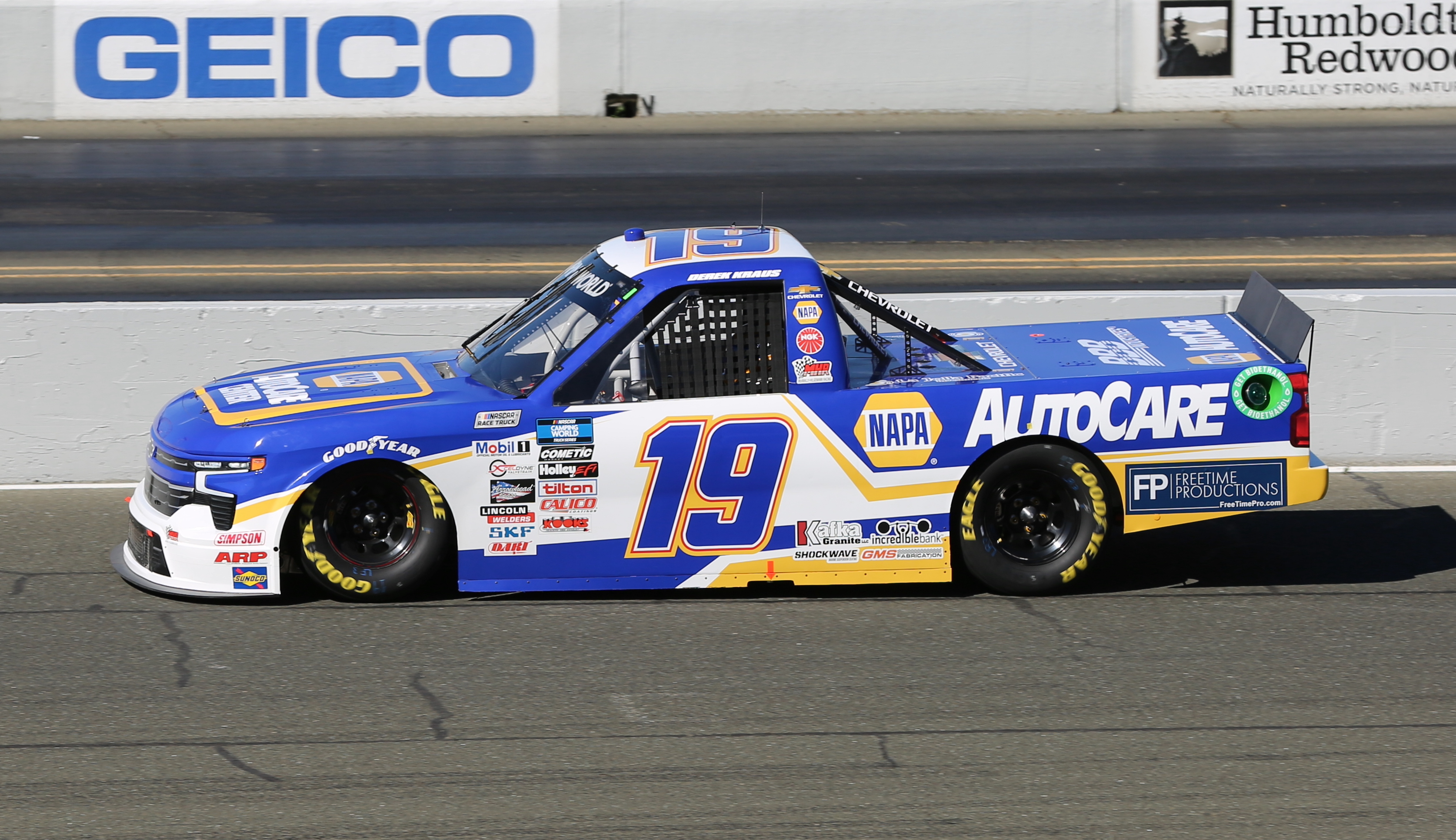
Kraus's No. 19 truck at Sonoma Raceway in 2022

On January 13, 2020, Bill McAnally Racing announced the formation of McAnally–Hilgemann Racing, a partnership with businessman and fellow Stratford native Bill Hilgemann, to field the No. 19 Tundra full-time in the Truck Series for Kraus. He began the season at Daytona International Speedway with a career-best fourth-place finish. At Darlington, Kraus nearly scored his first career win, finishing second to Ben Rhodes in an overtime finish. Kraus returned to the team in 2021, but had a new crew chief in Matt Noyce, who moved over from ThorSport Racing No. 99 truck of Ben Rhodes. His previous crew chief, Kevin Bellicourt, left McAnally to crew chief the No. 77 Spire Motorsports car in the Cup Series.

==== 2023–present ====
On December 6, 2022, McAnally–Hilgemann Racing announced that Kraus would be replaced in the No. 19 truck by former ThorSport Racing driver Christian Eckes for 2023. On February 1, 2023, it was announced that Kraus would drive the Young's Motorsports No. 20 truck in the season-opener at Daytona with the possibility of running more races for the team if sponsorship is found. On March 21, it was announced that Kraus would make his Xfinity Series debut in the Xfinity Series race at Richmond in the No. 10 car for Kaulig Racing and would run a part-time schedule for the rest of the year in that car. On July 26, Kaulig announced that Kraus would drive their No. 16 Cup Series car in practice and qualifying at Richmond in place of A. J. Allmendinger who would compete in the Xfinity Series race at Road America on the same day. He was chosen to fill in for Allmendinger as he is the team's simulator driver. Kraus also did some simulator driving for Legacy Motor Club in 2023.

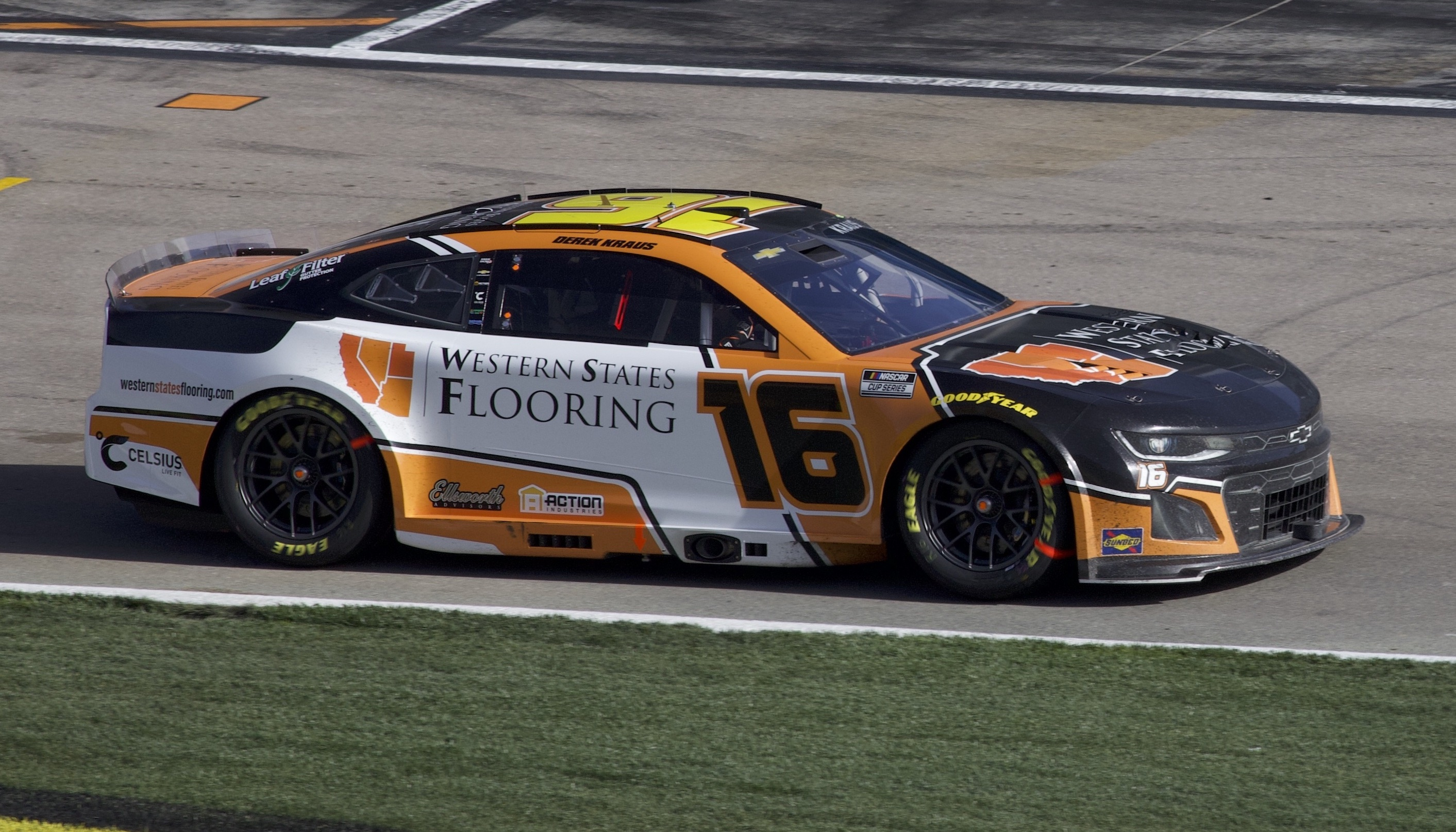
Kraus' No. 16 car at Las Vegas Motor Speedway in 2024

On February 22, 2024, it was announced that Kraus would drive the No. 16 for Kaulig Racing part-time in the NASCAR Cup Series, with his first start being at Las Vegas Motor Speedway.

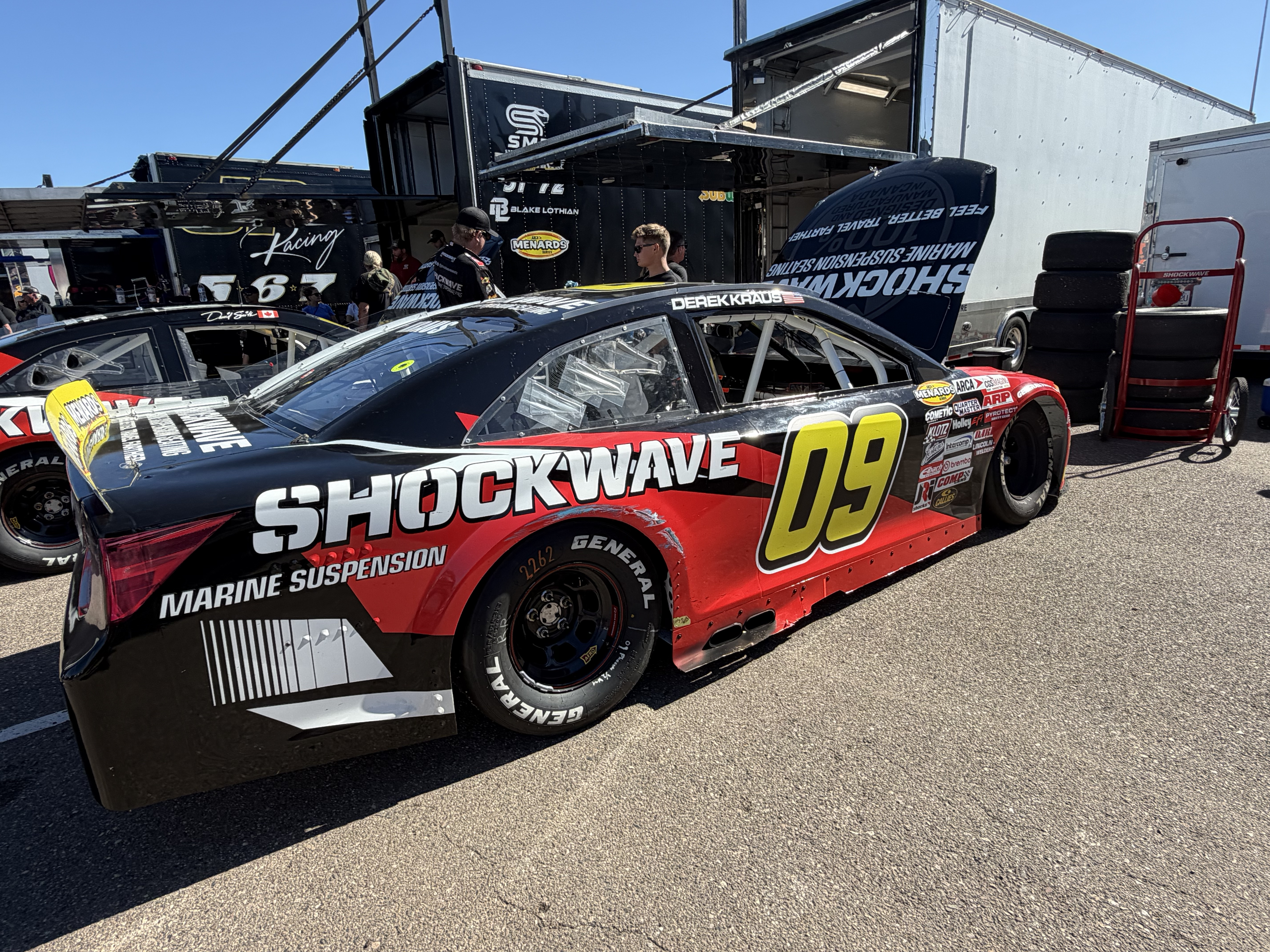
Kraus' No. 09 car at Phoenix Raceway in 2025

In 2025, it was revealed that Kraus would drive the No. 44 Chevrolet for NY Racing Team at the Coca-Cola 600. He would start 37th and finish 32nd. At the Cook Out Southern 500, Kraus failed to finish the race after the No. 44 car caught on fire. Later in the year, he made a return to the ARCA Menards Series West at the season ending race at Phoenix Raceway, where he drove the No. 09 Toyota for Shockwave Motorsports. That same year, Kraus also ran full-time in the ASA STARS National Tour, getting his first win at Newport Speedway.

== Personal life ==
Kraus attended Stratford High School and was on the school's wrestling team and also played football his freshman year. He graduated from high school in 2020 and missed his graduation ceremony, which was rescheduled to July due to COVID-19, to race in the truck race at Kansas on the same day. After that, he moved from Wisconsin to Charlotte, North Carolina, where most NASCAR teams are based.

His father, Mark, raced super late models in the 2000s.

== Motorsports career results ==
=== Career summary ===
Season	Series	Team	Car No.	Races	Wins	Top fives	Top tens	Poles	Laps led	Position	Points	Ref
2017	NASCAR K&N Pro Series East	Bill McAnally Racing	99	1	1	1	1	0	0	40th	41	
2017	NASCAR K&N Pro Series West	Bill McAnally Racing	19	14	1	9	10	1	109	3rd	534	
2018	NASCAR Camping World Truck Series	Bill McAnally Racing	19	1	0	0	1	0	0	62nd	30	
2018	NASCAR K&N Pro Series East	Bill McAnally Racing	16	6	1	3	3	1	39	12th	287	
2018	NASCAR K&N Pro Series East	DGR-Crosley	1	2	0	2	2	1	51	12th	287	
2018	NASCAR K&N Pro Series West	Bill McAnally Racing	16	14	4	8	10	5	717	4th	543	
2019	NASCAR Gander Outdoors Truck Series	Bill McAnally Racing	19	4	0	0	1	0	0	43rd	64	
2019	NASCAR K&N Pro Series East	Bill McAnally Racing	16	9	2	6	9	0	102	7th	366	
2019	NASCAR K&N Pro Series West	Bill McAnally Racing	16	14	5	11	13	2	812	1st	591	
2020	NASCAR Gander RV & Outdoors Truck Series	McAnally–Hilgemann Racing	19	23	0	3	13	0	31	11th	645	
2021	NASCAR Camping World Truck Series	McAnally–Hilgemann Racing	19	22	0	1	4	2	58	13th	457	
2021	ARCA Menards Series	McAnally–Hilgemann Racing	19	1	0	1	1	0	0	75th	39	
2021	ARCA Menards Series West	McAnally–Hilgemann Racing	19	1	0	1	1	0	0	41st	39	
2022	NASCAR Camping World Truck Series	McAnally–Hilgemann Racing	19	23	0	0	7	2	45	11th	595	
2022	ARCA Menards Series	McAnally–Hilgemann Racing	19	1	0	0	1	0	0	83rd	35	
2022	ARCA Menards Series West	McAnally–Hilgemann Racing	19	1	0	0	1	0	0	55th	35	
2023	NASCAR Xfinity Series	Kaulig Racing	10/11	8	0	0	3	0	21	NC†	0	
2023	NASCAR Craftsman Truck Series	Young's Motorsports	20	1	0	0	0	0	0	72nd	9	
2023	NASCAR Craftsman Truck Series	Spire Motorsports	7/77	2	0	0	1	0	0	72nd	9	
2023	ASA STARS National Tour	Derek Kraus Racing	9/9K	5	0	1	3	0	0	13th	227	
2024	NASCAR Cup Series	Kaulig Racing	16	6	0	0	0	0	8	38th	44	
2024	ASA STARS National Tour	Derek Kraus Racing	9/9K	6	0	1	3	0	0	9th	296	
2025	NASCAR Cup Series	NY Racing Team	44	2	0	0	0	0	0	39th	6	
2025	ARCA Menards Series West	Shockwave Motorsports	09	1	0	0	0	0	0	65th	30	
2025	ASA STARS National Tour	Derek Kraus Racing	9/9K	12	1	2	2	1	199	8th	550	
2026	CARS Late Model Stock Car Tour	Shane Wilson Racing	62/62K	2	0	0	1	0	0	49th	52	
2026	ASA STARS National Tour	Derek Kraus Racing	9/9K	11	0	3	3	0	29	-*	-*	

=== NASCAR ===
(key) (Bold – Pole position awarded by qualifying time. Italics – Pole position earned by points standings or practice time. * – Most laps led.)

==== Cup Series ====
NASCAR Cup Series results
Year	Team	No.	Make	1	2	3	4	5	6	7	8	9	10	11	12	13	14	15	16	17	18	19	20	21	22	23	24	25	26	27	28	29	30	31	32	33	34	35	36	NCSC	Pts	Ref
2023	Kaulig Racing	16	Chevy	DAY	CAL	LVS	PHO	ATL	COA	RCH	BRD	MAR	TAL	DOV	KAN	DAR	CLT	GTW	SON	NSH	CSC	ATL	NHA	POC	RCH; QL^{†}	MCH	IRC	GLN	DAY	DAR	KAN	BRI	TEX	TAL	ROV	LVS	HOM	MAR	PHO	N/A	–	
2024	Kaulig Racing	16	Chevy	DAY	ATL	LVS; 28	PHO; 35	BRI	COA	RCH	MAR	TEX	TAL	DOV	KAN; 31	DAR; 29	CLT	GTW; 30	SON	IOW	NHA	NSH	CSC	POC	IND	RCH	MCH	DAY	DAR	ATL	GLN	BRI	KAN	TAL	ROV	LVS	HOM	MAR	PHO; 25	38th	44	
2025	NY Racing Team	44	Chevy	DAY	ATL	COA	PHO	LVS	HOM	MAR	DAR	BRI	TAL	TEX	KAN	CLT; 32	NSH	MCH	MXC	POC	ATL	CSC	SON	DOV	IND	IOW	GLN	RCH	DAY	DAR; 36	GTW	BRI	NHA	KAN	ROV	LVS	TAL	MAR	PHO	39th	6	
^{†} – Qualified for A. J. Allmendinger

==== Xfinity Series ====
NASCAR Xfinity Series results
Year	Team	No.	Make	1	2	3	4	5	6	7	8	9	10	11	12	13	14	15	16	17	18	19	20	21	22	23	24	25	26	27	28	29	30	31	32	33	NXSC	Pts	Ref
2023	Kaulig Racing	10	Chevy	DAY	CAL	LVS	PHO	ATL	COA	RCH; 10	MAR; 8	TAL; 27	DOV; 20	DAR	CLT	POR	SON	NSH	CSC	ATL	NHA	POC	ROA	MCH	IRC	GLN	DAY	DAR									85th	0^{1}	
2023	Kaulig Racing	11	Chevy																										KAN; 8	BRI; 12	TEX	ROV	LVS	HOM; 11	MAR	PHO; 37	85th	0^{1}	

==== Craftsman Truck Series ====
NASCAR Craftsman Truck Series results
Year	Team	No.	Make	1	2	3	4	5	6	7	8	9	10	11	12	13	14	15	16	17	18	19	20	21	22	23	NCTC	Pts	Ref
2018	Bill McAnally Racing	19	Toyota	DAY	ATL	LVS	MAR	DOV	KAN	CLT	TEX	IOW	GTW	CHI	KEN	ELD	POC	MCH	BRI	MSP	LVS	TAL	MAR	TEX	PHO; 8	HOM	62nd	30	
2019	Bill McAnally Racing	19	Toyota	DAY	ATL	LVS	MAR; 18	TEX	DOV; 8	KAN	CLT	TEX	IOW	GTW	CHI	KEN	POC	ELD	MCH	BRI	MSP	LVS; 27	TAL	MAR	PHO; 31	HOM; DNQ	43rd	64	
2020	McAnally–Hilgemann Racing	19	Toyota	DAY; 4	LVS; 22	CLT; 16	ATL; 7	HOM; 15	POC; 10	KEN; 8	TEX; 11	KAN; 5	KAN; 7	MCH; 8	DRC; 30	DOV; 10	GTW; 13	DAR; 2	RCH; 23	BRI; 15	LVS; 30	TAL; 10*	KAN; 9	TEX; 9	MAR; 10	PHO; 24	11th	645	
2021	McAnally–Hilgemann Racing	19	Toyota	DAY; 33	DRC; 7	LVS; 32	ATL; 13	BRD; 38	RCH; 15	KAN; 28	DAR; 35	COA; 21	CLT; 8	TEX; 13	**NSH**; 35*	POC; 10	**KNX**; 5	GLN; 21	GTW; 20	DAR; 16	BRI; 13	LVS; 12	TAL; 20	MAR; 24	PHO; 15		13th	480	
2022	McAnally–Hilgemann Racing	19	Chevy	DAY; 26	LVS; 24	ATL; 9	COA; 12	MAR; 14	BRD; 29	DAR; 19	KAN; 8	TEX; 36	CLT; 12	GTW; 7	SON; 27	**KNX**; 6	NSH; 11	MOH; 8	POC; 9	IRP; 14	RCH; 12	KAN; 21	**BRI**; 6	TAL; 13	HOM; 15	PHO; 11	11th	595	
2023	Young's Motorsports	20	Chevy	DAY; 18	LVS	ATL	COA	TEX	BRD	MAR	KAN	DAR	NWS	CLT	GTW	NSH	MOH	POC	RCH	IRP							72nd	9	
2023	Spire Motorsports	7	Chevy																		MLW; 8	KAN	BRI	TAL	HOM		72nd	9	
2023	Spire Motorsports	77	Chevy																							PHO; 28	72nd	9	

^{*} Season still in progress
^{1} Ineligible for series points

==== K&N Pro Series East ====
NASCAR K&N Pro Series East results
Year	Team	No.	Make	1	2	3	4	5	6	7	8	9	10	11	12	13	14	NKNPSEC	Pts	Ref
2017	Bill McAnally Racing	99	Toyota	NSM; 3	GRE	BRI	SBO	SBO	MEM	BLN	TMP	NHA	IOW	GLN	LGY	NJM	DOV	40th	41	
2018	Bill McAnally Racing	16	Toyota	NSM; 4	BRI; 24	LGY	SBO	SBO	MEM; 14	NJM	TMP	**NHA**; 5	IOW; 20	GLN	GTW; 1*			12th	287	
2018	DGR-Crosley	1	Toyota													**NHA**; 2	DOV; 3	12th	287	
2019	Bill McAnally Racing	16	Toyota	NSM; 1	BRI; 6	SBO; 9	SBO; 1*	MEM; 5	NHA; 3	IOW; 4	GLN; 9	BRI	GTW; 2	NHA	DOV			7th	366	

=== ARCA Menards Series ===
(key) (Bold – Pole position awarded by qualifying time. Italics – Pole position earned by points standings or practice time. * – Most laps led.)

ARCA Menards Series results
Year	Team	No.	Make	1	2	3	4	5	6	7	8	9	10	11	12	13	14	15	16	17	18	19	20	AMSC	Pts	Ref
2021	Bill McAnally Racing	19	Toyota	DAY	PHO; 5	TAL	KAN	TOL	CLT	MOH	POC	ELK	BLN	IOW	WIN	GLN	MCH	ISF	MLW	DSF	BRI	SLM	KAN	75th	39	
2022	Bill McAnally Racing	19	Chevy	DAY	PHO; 9	TAL	KAN	CLT	IOW	BLN	ELK	MOH	POC	IRP	MCH	GLN	ISF	MLW	DSF	KAN	BRI	SLM	TOL	83rd	35	

==== ARCA Menards Series West ====
ARCA Menards Series West results
Year	Team	No.	Make	1	2	3	4	5	6	7	8	9	10	11	12	13	14	AMSWC	Pts	Ref
2017	Bill McAnally Racing	19	Toyota	TUS; 6	KCR; 2	IRW; 18	IRW; 4	SPO; 2	OSS; 16	CNS; 2	SON; 5	**IOW**; 11	EVG; 11	DCS; 3	MER; 5	AAS; 4	KCR; 1	3rd	534	
2018	Bill McAnally Racing	16	Toyota	KCR; 1	**TUS**; 4	**TUS**; 11	OSS; 5	CNS; 4	SON; 10	DCS; 1*	IOW; 20	EVG; 9	GTW; 1*	LVS; 17*	**MER**; 3*	AAS; 15	KCR; 1*	4th	543	
2019	Bill McAnally Racing	16	Toyota	LVS; 6*	IRW; 3*	TUS; 1**	TUS; 1*	CNS; 8	SON; 19	**DCS**; 1**	IOW; 4	EVG; 2	GTW; 2	MER; 1	AAS; 4	**KCR**; 1**	PHO; 3	1st	591	
2021	Bill McAnally Racing	19	Toyota	PHO; 5	SON	IRW	CNS	IRW	PIR	LVS	AAS	PHO						41st	39	
2022	Bill McAnally Racing	19	Chevy	PHO; 9	IRW	KCR	PIR	SON	IRW	EVG	PIR	AAS	LVS	PHO				55th	35	
2025	Shockwave Motorsports	09	Toyota	KER	PHO	TUC	CNS	KER	SON	TRI	PIR	AAS	MAD	LVS	PHO; 14			65th	30	

=== CARS Late Model Stock Car Tour ===
(key) (Bold – Pole position awarded by qualifying time. Italics – Pole position earned by points standings or practice time. * – Most laps led. ** – All laps led.)

CARS Late Model Stock Car Tour results
Year	Team	No.	Make	1	2	3	4	5	6	7	8	9	10	11	12	13	14	CLMSCTC	Pts	Ref
2026	Shane Wilson Racing	62	Ford	SNM	WCS	NSV	CRW	ACE	LGY; 26	DOM	NWS	HCY	AND	FLC	TCM			49th	52	
2026	Shane Wilson Racing	62K	Ford													NPS; 7	SBO	49th	52	

=== ASA STARS National Tour ===
(key) (Bold – Pole position awarded by qualifying time. Italics – Pole position earned by points standings or practice time. * – Most laps led. ** – All laps led.)

ASA STARS National Tour results
Year	Team	No.	Make	1	2	3	4	5	6	7	8	9	10	11	12	ASNTC	Pts	Ref
2023	Derek Kraus Racing	9	Chevy	FIF; 21		NWS; 32	HCY	MLW; 9	AND							13th	227	
2023	Derek Kraus Racing	9K	Toyota		MAD; 9											13th	227	
2023	Derek Kraus Racing	9K	Chevy							WIR; 3	TOL	WIN	NSV			13th	227	
2024	Derek Kraus Racing	9K	Chevy	NSM; 12	FIF	HCY; 8	MAD; 11		AND; 4	OWO						9th	296	
2024	Derek Kraus Racing	9	Chevy					MLW; 8			TOL; 16	WIN	NSV			9th	296	
2025	Derek Kraus Racing	9K	Chevy	NSM; 12			HCY; 11	NPS; 1								8th	550	
2025	Derek Kraus Racing	9	Chevy		FIF; 20	DOM; 18			MAD; 9	SLG; 4	**AND**; 12*	OWO; 18	TOL; 21	WIN; 13	NSV; 20	8th	550	
2026	Derek Kraus Racing	9	Chevy	NSM; 14	FIF; 17	HCY; 16	SLG; 4	MAD; 13	NPS; 16	OWO; 12	TRI; 5	WIN; 11				-*	-*	
2026	Derek Kraus Racing	9K	Chevy										NSV; 17	NSM; 5		-*	-*	
