= NASCAR Camping World Truck Series at Knoxville Raceway =

NASCAR Camping World Truck Series race at Knoxville

Clean Harbors 150

NASCAR Camping World Truck Series
- Venue: Knoxville Raceway
- Location: Knoxville, Iowa
- Corporate sponsor: Clean Harbors
- First race: 2021
- Last race: 2022
- Distance: 75 miles (121 km)
- Laps: 150; Stage 1: 40; Stage 2: 50; Final stage: 60
- Previous names: Corn Belt 150 presented by Premier Chevy Dealers (2021)

Circuit information
- Surface: Dirt
- Length: .5 mi (0.80 km)
- Turns: 4

The Clean Harbors 150 was a NASCAR Camping World Truck Series racing event at Knoxville Raceway in Iowa. The inaugural running of the race was on July 9, 2021, the first NASCAR national touring event held at Knoxville Raceway, and was sponsored by Chevrolet. The second and final race was in June 2022 and was sponsored by Clean Harbors.

== History ==
In 2013, the Camping World Truck Series raced the Eldora Dirt Derby at Eldora Speedway in NASCAR's first national touring series dirt track race since 1970; the event ran from 2013 to 2019, before being canceled in 2020 due to the COVID-19 pandemic, and then not renewed for 2021 as NASCAR shuffled its national touring series schedules.

In November 2020, NASCAR revealed the 2021 Camping World Truck Series schedule, which featured two dirt-track events, one being the Pinty's Dirt Truck Race at Bristol Motor Speedway in March, and the other at Knoxville Raceway in Iowa in July.

At the July event, the NASCAR Camping World Truck Series anchored the weekend's races, accompanied by the Brandt Professional Agriculture Corn Belt Clash for the United States Auto Club's AMSOIL National Sprint Car Series and the POWRi W.A.R. Sprint Car Series. The race, 150 laps on the half-mile dirt track, was the first time an event sanctioned by one of NASCAR's national touring series – the NASCAR Cup Series, Xfinity Series, and Camping World Truck Series – was held at Knoxville Raceway. On June 25, 2021, the association of Iowa Chevrolet dealerships (Premier Chevy Dealers) was announced as the presenting sponsor of the 150-lap race.

In 2022, the race was moved from July (on the same weekend as the Cup and Xfinity Series races at Atlanta) to June (on the only off weekend of the year for the Cup Series and Xfinity Series). In April 2022, Clean Harbors was announced as the race's title sponsor.

The race was removed from the schedule in 2023.

== Past winners ==
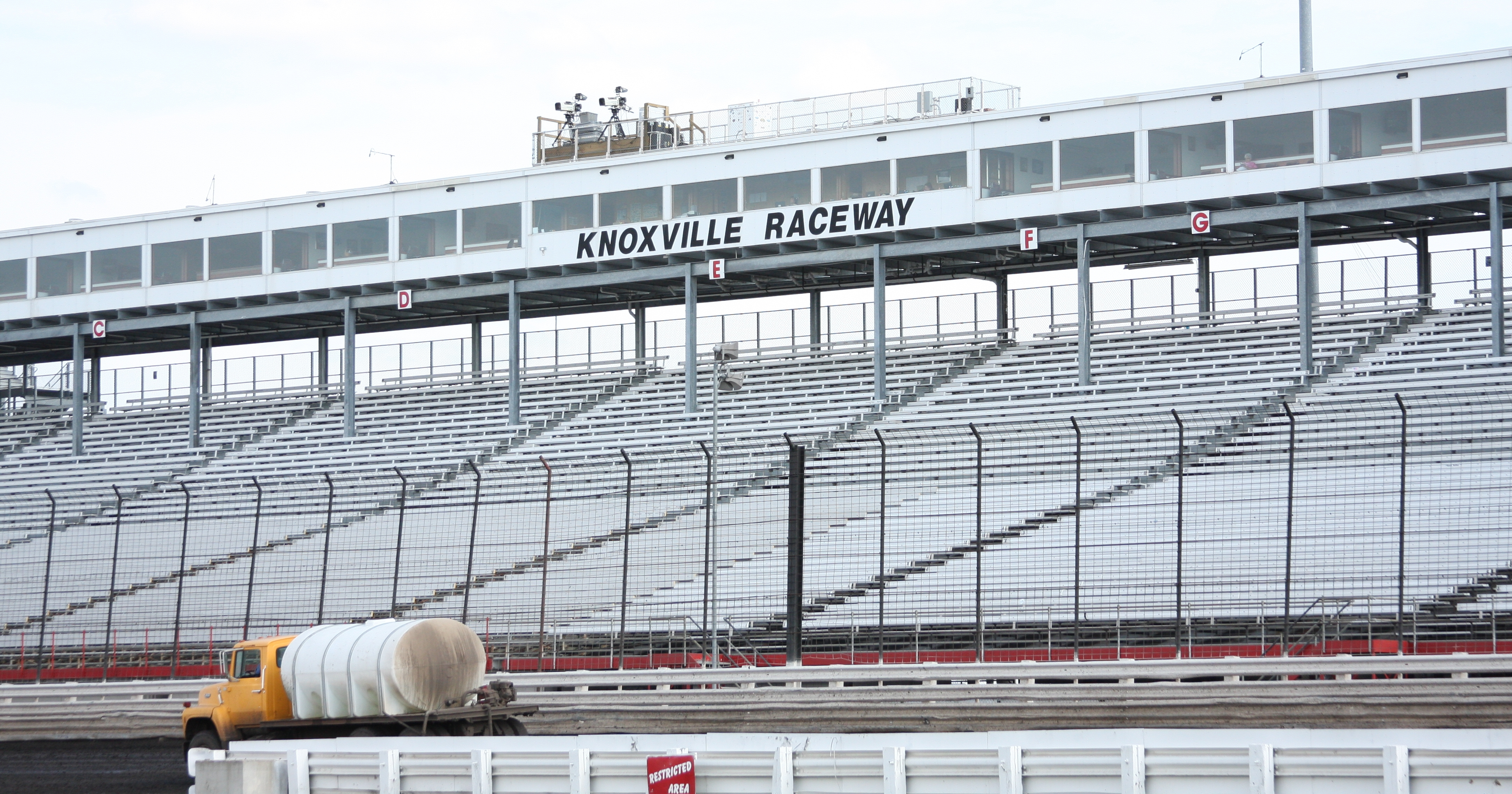
Grandstands at Knoxville Raceway

Year	Day	Date	No.	Driver	Team	Manufacturer	Race Distance		Race Time	Average Speed (mph)	Report	Ref
Year	Day	Date	No.	Driver	Team	Manufacturer	Laps	Miles (km)	Race Time	Average Speed (mph)	Report	Ref
2021	Friday	July 9	16	Austin Hill	Hattori Racing Enterprises	Toyota	179*	89.5 (144.393)	2:25:55	36.802	Report	
2022	Saturday	June 18	17	Todd Gilliland	David Gilliland Racing	Ford	150	75 (120.999)	2:12:07	34.061	Report	

=== Notes ===
- 2021: The race was extended due to a NASCAR Overtime finish.
