= 2021 Corn Belt 150 =

2021 Corn Belt 150 presented by Premier Chevy Dealers
Race details
- Race 14 of 22 of the 2021 NASCAR Camping World Truck Series
- Date: July 9, 2021
- Official name: Corn Belt 150 presented by Premier Chevy Dealers
- Location: Knoxville Raceway, Knoxville, Iowa
- Course: Permanent racing facility
- Course length: 0.5 miles (0.805 km)
- Distance: 179 laps, 89.5 mi (144.036 km)
- Scheduled distance: 150 laps, 75 mi (120.701 km)
- Average speed: 36.802 miles per hour (59.227 km/h)

Pole position
Driver	Derek Kraus	McAnally–Hilgemann Racing
- Grid positions set by heat results

Most laps led
Driver	Chandler Smith	Kyle Busch Motorsports
- Laps: 71

Winner
No. 16	Austin Hill	Hattori Racing Enterprises

Television in the United States
- Network: Fox Sports 1
- Announcers: Vince Welch, Michael Waltrip, Kevin Swindell

The 2021 Corn Belt 150 presented by Premier Chevy Dealers was the 14th stock car race of the 2021 NASCAR Camping World Truck Series season and the inaugural running of the event, after Eldora Speedway's dirt race was moved to Knoxville Raceway. The race was held on Friday, July 9, 2021 in Knoxville, Iowa at Knoxville Raceway. The race was extended to 179 laps from the scheduled 150 laps due to numerous green-white-checker attempts. Austin Hill driving for Hattori Racing Enterprises would survive and win the event after dodging numerous wrecks and a wild ending to the event. Chandler Smith of Kyle Busch Motorsports and Grant Enfinger of ThorSport Racing would be able to come in 2nd and 3rd, respectively. Norm Benning would get his first Top 20 of the year, in a damaged truck finishing 19th.

The race was highly criticized by NASCAR fans and drivers. Drivers would report that other drivers had no respect for others on the track, contributing to the amount of wrecks during the race. Fans would criticize the way NASCAR handled the race, saying that NASCAR should not had raced on dirt due to the amount of wrecks that happened, and that the race was similar to a demolition derby.

The race was the NASCAR Camping World Truck Series debuts for Morgan Alexander, Jessica Friesen, Parker Price-Miller, Devon Rouse and Donny Schatz.

== Background ==
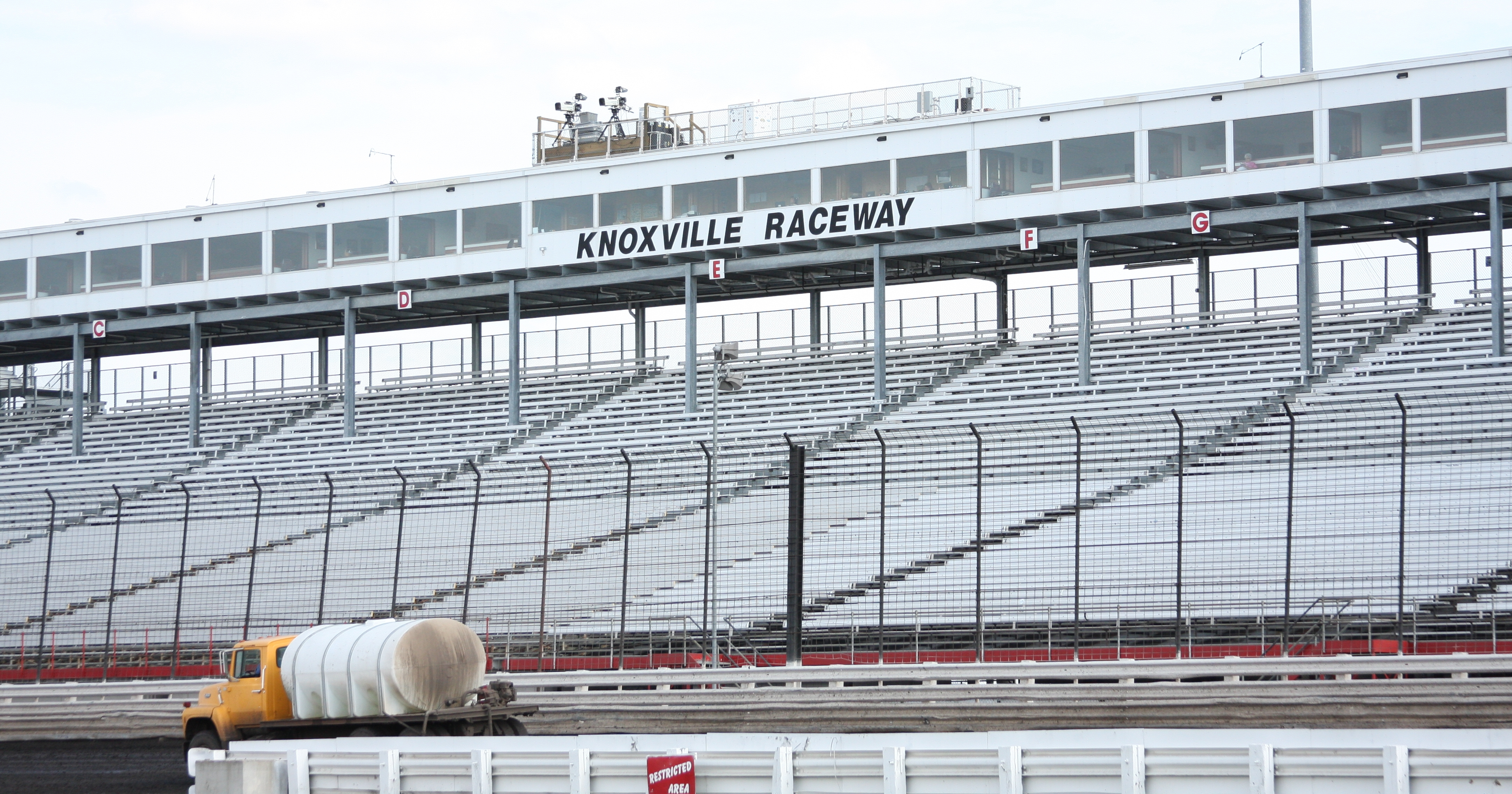
Knoxville Raceway, the venue where the race was held.

=== Entry list ===
#	Driver	Team	Make
1	Hailie Deegan	David Gilliland Racing	Ford
2	Sheldon Creed	GMS Racing	Chevrolet
02	Michael Annett*	Young's Motorsports	Chevrolet
3	Parker Price-Miller	Jordan Anderson Racing	Chevrolet
4	John Hunter Nemechek	Kyle Busch Motorsports	Toyota
04	Chase Briscoe	Roper Racing	Ford
6	Norm Benning	Norm Benning Racing	Chevrolet
9	Codie Rohrbaugh	CR7 Motorsports	Chevrolet
10	Jennifer Jo Cobb	Jennifer Jo Cobb Racing	Chevrolet
12	Tate Fogleman	Young's Motorsports	Chevrolet
13	Johnny Sauter	ThorSport Racing	Toyota
15	Tanner Gray	David Gilliland Racing	Ford
16	Austin Hill	Hattori Racing Enterprises	Toyota
17	Donny Schatz	David Gilliland Racing	Ford
18	Chandler Smith	Kyle Busch Motorsports	Toyota
19	Derek Kraus	McAnally–Hilgemann Racing	Toyota
20	Kyle Strickler	Young's Motorsports	Chevrolet
21	Zane Smith	GMS Racing	Chevrolet
22	Austin Wayne Self	AM Racing	Chevrolet
23	Chase Purdy	GMS Racing	Chevrolet
24	Jack Wood	GMS Racing	Chevrolet
25	Josh Berry	Rackley W.A.R.	Chevrolet
26	Tyler Ankrum	GMS Racing	Chevrolet
30	Danny Bohn	On Point Motorsports	Toyota
33	Devon Rouse	Reaume Brothers Racing	Chevrolet
34	Jake Griffin	Reaume Brothers Racing	Chevrolet
37	Brett Moffitt	AM Racing	Chevrolet
38	Todd Gilliland	Front Row Motorsports	Ford
40	Ryan Truex	Niece Motorsports	Chevrolet
41	Cody Erickson	Cram Racing Enterprises	Chevrolet
42	Carson Hocevar	Niece Motorsports	Chevrolet
44	Morgan Alexander	Niece Motorsports	Chevrolet
45	Jett Noland	Niece Motorsports	Chevrolet
49	Andrew Gordon	CMI Motorsports	Toyota
51	Brian Brown	Kyle Busch Motorsports	Toyota
52	Stewart Friesen	Halmar Friesen Racing	Toyota
62	Jessica Friesen	Halmar Friesen Racing	Toyota
88	Matt Crafton	ThorSport Racing	Toyota
98	Grant Enfinger	ThorSport Racing	Toyota
99	Ben Rhodes	ThorSport Racing	Toyota
Official entry list

*Driver would change to Chris Windom, due to a leg injury Michael Annett had suffered.

== Qualifying ==
Qualifying was set by heats, and a points system. There were 4 heats of 10 cars. As only 40 trucks entered the race, no drivers would not qualify. The way drivers would get their positions worked like this: Drivers would get 10 points for 1st, 9 points for 2nd, etc. Additionally, for every car passed, drivers would get an additional point for every car passed. No negative points were given. If a driver ended behind where they started, they would just get no passing points. The points would not be good for the regular season.

Derek Kraus of McAnally–Hilgemann Racing would get the most points and therefore take the pole position.

=== Heat #1 ===
Fin	St	#	Driver	Team	Make	Pts
1	1	25	Josh Berry	Rackley W.A.R.	Chevrolet	10
2	4	3	Parker Price-Miller	Jordan Anderson Racing	Chevrolet	11
3	8	1	Hailie Deegan	David Gilliland Racing	Ford	13
4	7	18	Chandler Smith	Kyle Busch Motorsports	Toyota	10
5	2	22	Austin Wayne Self	AM Racing	Chevrolet	6
6	6	15	Tanner Gray	David Gilliland Racing	Ford	5
7	9	41	Cody Erickson	Cram Racing Enterprises	Chevrolet	6
8	10	12	Tate Fogleman	Young's Motorsports	Chevrolet	5
9	5	45	Jett Noland	Niece Motorsports	Chevrolet	2
10	3	33	Devon Rouse	Reaume Brothers Racing	Chevrolet	1

=== Heat #2 ===
Fin	St	#	Driver	Team	Make	Pts
1	2	20	Kyle Strickler	Young's Motorsports	Chevrolet	11
2	1	21	Zane Smith	GMS Racing	Chevrolet	9
3	5	88	Matt Crafton	ThorSport Racing	Toyota	10
4	10	38	Todd Gilliland	Front Row Motorsports	Ford	13
5	3	99	Ben Rhodes	ThorSport Racing	Toyota	6
6	7	17	Donny Schatz	David Gilliland Racing	Ford	6
7	4	23	Chase Purdy	GMS Racing	Chevrolet	4
8	6	40	Ryan Truex	Niece Motorsports	Chevrolet	3
9	9	34	Jake Griffin	Reaume Brothers Racing	Chevrolet	2
10	8	9	Codie Rohrbaugh	CR7 Motorsports	Chevrolet	1

=== Heat #3 ===
Fin	St	#	Driver	Team	Make	Pts
1	5	26	Tyler Ankrum	GMS Racing	Chevrolet	14
2	10	19	Derek Kraus	McAnally–Hilgemann Racing	Toyota	17
3	3	51	Brian Brown	Kyle Busch Motorsports	Toyota	8
4	8	13	Johnny Sauter	ThorSport Racing	Toyota	11
5	2	24	Jack Wood	GMS Racing	Chevrolet	6
6	7	62	Jessica Friesen	Halmar Friesen Racing	Toyota	6
7	9	30	Danny Bohn	On Point Motorsports	Toyota	6
8	1	02	Chris Windom	Young's Motorsports	Chevrolet	3
9	6	44	Morgan Alexander	Niece Motorsports	Chevrolet	2
10	4	4	John Hunter Nemechek	Kyle Busch Motorsports	Toyota	1

=== Heat #4 ===
Fin	St	#	Driver	Team	Make	Pts
1	2	42	Carson Hocevar	Niece Motorsports	Chevrolet	11
2	3	04	Chase Briscoe	Roper Racing	Ford	10
3	1	37	Brett Moffitt	AM Racing	Chevrolet	8
4	6	16	Austin Hill	Hattori Racing Enterprises	Toyota	10
5	7	2	Sheldon Creed	GMS Racing	Chevrolet	8
6	5	98	Grant Enfinger	ThorSport Racing	Toyota	5
7	9	52	Stewart Friesen	Halmar Friesen Racing	Toyota	6
8	10	49	Andrew Gordon	CMI Motorsports	Toyota	5
9	4	6	Norm Benning	Norm Benning Racing	Chevrolet	2
10	8	10	Jennifer Jo Cobb	Jennifer Jo Cobb Racing	Chevrolet	1

=== Starting lineup ===
Pos.	#	Driver	Team	Make
1	19	Derek Kraus	McAnally–Hilgemann Racing	Toyota
2	26	Tyler Ankrum	GMS Racing	Chevrolet
3	38	Todd Gilliland	Front Row Motorsports	Ford
4	1	Hailie Deegan	David Gilliland Racing	Ford
5	42	Carson Hocevar	Niece Motorsports	Chevrolet
6	13	Johnny Sauter	ThorSport Racing	Toyota
7	3	Parker Price-Miller	Jordan Anderson Racing	Chevrolet
8	20	Kyle Strickler	Young's Motorsports	Chevrolet
9	88	Matt Crafton	ThorSport Racing	Toyota
10	18	Chandler Smith	Kyle Busch Motorsports	Toyota
11	25	Josh Berry	Rackley W.A.R.	Chevrolet
12	04	Chase Briscoe	Roper Racing	Ford
13	16	Austin Hill	Hattori Racing Enterprises	Toyota
14	21	Zane Smith	GMS Racing	Chevrolet
15	51	Brian Brown	Kyle Busch Motorsports	Toyota
16	2	Sheldon Creed	GMS Racing	Chevrolet
17	37	Brett Moffitt	AM Racing	Chevrolet
18	99	Ben Rhodes	ThorSport Racing	Toyota
19	52	Stewart Friesen	Halmar Friesen Racing	Toyota
20	24	Jack Wood	GMS Racing	Chevrolet
21	22	Austin Wayne Self	AM Racing	Chevrolet
22	17	Donny Schatz	David Gilliland Racing	Ford
23	30	Danny Bohn	On Point Motorsports	Toyota
24	41	Cody Erickson	Cram Racing Enterprises	Chevrolet
25	62	Jessica Friesen	Halmar Friesen Racing	Toyota
26	98	Grant Enfinger	ThorSport Racing	Toyota
27	15	Tanner Gray	David Gilliland Racing	Ford
28	12	Tate Fogleman	Young's Motorsports	Chevrolet
29	49	Andrew Gordon	CMI Motorsports	Toyota
30	23	Chase Purdy	GMS Racing	Chevrolet
31	40	Ryan Truex	Niece Motorsports	Chevrolet
32	02	Chris Windom	Young's Motorsports	Chevrolet
33	45	Jett Noland	Niece Motorsports	Chevrolet
34	34	Jake Griffin	Reaume Brothers Racing	Chevrolet
35	44	Morgan Alexander	Niece Motorsports	Chevrolet
36	6	Norm Benning	Norm Benning Racing	Chevrolet
37	4	John Hunter Nemechek	Kyle Busch Motorsports	Toyota
38	9	Codie Rohrbaugh	CR7 Motorsports	Chevrolet
39	33	Devon Rouse	Reaume Brothers Racing	Chevrolet
40	10	Jennifer Jo Cobb	Jennifer Jo Cobb Racing	Chevrolet
Official starting lineup

== Race ==
=== Post-race driver comments ===
Many drivers and teams seemed displeased and angry post-race. Sheldon Creed, involved in the big one advocated for the removal of Trucks at Knoxville said "We don't belong here. We should be down at Iowa Speedway where these trucks are made for." Carson Hocevar commented that "I think everyone from the dirt community is just going to sit there, point at us, and laugh," criticizing the amount of chaos that happened. Kyle Strickler would comment on the seeming lack of respect on track: "The total lack of respect for other drivers and other drivers' equipment last night absolutely blew my mind. I think all the spoiled ass rich punk kids should be in the shop first thing on Monday morning so they can fix all this shit they tore up. Maybe then they'll think twice about blasting people out of the way when they realize how much it takes to make it to the race track every weekend." This was a comment that many drivers agreed with, including Hocevar and Nemechek.

Some drivers were angry at McAnally–Hilgemann Racing driver Derek Kraus, with both Grant Enfinger and Tyler Ankrum spinning Kraus after the race after wrecking people for position. Austin Wayne Self said "In my opinion, I knew the race was aggressive but there was a couple of guys out there and [Derek Kraus] was definitely one that was very disrespectful to people and wasn't really racing. I mean, he was just pushing people out of the way and wrecking people and tearing stuff up."

Chandler Smith, who had led a race-high 71 laps, had said "I can’t catch a break, it feels like. I get so close to these wins — and something happens. Or we have a really good day and something happens. (Friday), we had a really solid day. ... I really thought that was going to be ours there, but it is what it is I guess.”

Grant Enfinger would seem to forgive the rough driving and wrecks, as drivers were desperate for a win and will do anything to win, stating "There's no penalty for rough driving when we're putting all this on 60-70 mph short track to be honest."

Donny Schatz, making his debut in NASCAR, seemed flabbergasted at the amount of wrecks and torn-up cars, saying that "A lot of stuff got tore up and I don’t know if that’s normal or not around here, but it sure seems like it based on what I heard in the infield care center."

Austin Hill seemed the only one coming back home happy, with him taking the victory. Hill had this to say: "Winning at a place like Knoxville definitely puts your name on the map. I’m not a dirt guy — so I don’t know a ton about dirt racing — but I know about Knoxville and the history here. It’s a cool place to win at, for sure. This builds our confidence, for sure, and there’s no telling how many races we can win going forward.”

== Race results ==
Stage 1 Laps: 40

Fin.	#	Driver	Team	Make	Pts
1	19	Derek Kraus	McAnally–Hilgemann Racing	Toyota	10
2	38	Todd Gilliland	Front Row Motorsports	Ford	9
3	25	Josh Berry	Rackley W.A.R.	Chevrolet	0
4	42	Carson Hocevar	Niece Motorsports	Chevrolet	7
5	26	Tyler Ankrum	GMS Racing	Chevrolet	6
6	2	Sheldon Creed	GMS Racing	Chevrolet	5
7	52	Stewart Friesen	Halmar Friesen Racing	Toyota	4
8	37	Brett Moffitt	AM Racing	Chevrolet	0
9	18	Chandler Smith	Kyle Busch Motorsports	Toyota	2
10	1	Austin Hill	Hattori Racing Enterprises	Toyota	1

Stage 2 Laps: 40

Fin.	#	Driver	Team	Make	Pts
1	19	Derek Kraus	McAnally–Hilgemann Racing	Toyota	10
2	42	Carson Hocevar	Niece Motorsports	Chevrolet	9
3	38	Todd Gilliland	Front Row Motorsports	Ford	8
4	88	Matt Crafton	ThorSport Racing	Toyota	7
5	98	Grant Enfinger	ThorSport Racing	Toyota	6
6	37	Brett Moffitt	AM Racing	Chevrolet	0
7	4	John Hunter Nemechek	Kyle Busch Motorsports	Toyota	4
8	25	Josh Berry	Rackley W.A.R.	Chevrolet	0
9	17	Donny Schatz	David Gilliland Racing	Ford	2
10	99	Ben Rhodes	ThorSport Racing	Toyota	1

Stage 3 Laps: 99

Fin	St	#	Driver	Team	Make	Laps	Led	Status	Pts
1	13	16	Austin Hill	Hattori Racing Enterprises	Toyota	179	11	running	41
2	10	18	Chandler Smith	Kyle Busch Motorsports	Toyota	179	71	running	37
3	26	98	Grant Enfinger	ThorSport Racing	Toyota	179	0	running	40
4	3	38	Todd Gilliland	Front Row Motorsports	Ford	179	61	running	50
5	1	19	Derek Kraus	McAnally–Hilgemann Racing	Toyota	179	10	running	52
6	9	88	Matt Crafton	ThorSport Racing	Toyota	179	1	running	38
7	18	99	Ben Rhodes	ThorSport Racing	Toyota	179	0	running	31
8	15	51	Brian Brown	Kyle Busch Motorsports	Toyota	179	0	running	29
9	28	12	Tate Fogleman	Young's Motorsports	Chevrolet	179	0	running	28
10	23	30	Danny Bohn	On Point Motorsports	Toyota	179	0	running	27
11	37	4	John Hunter Nemechek	Kyle Busch Motorsports	Toyota	179	0	running	30
12	34	34	Jake Griffin	Reaume Brothers Racing	Chevrolet	179	0	running	25
13	31	40	Ryan Truex	Niece Motorsports	Chevrolet	179	0	running	24
14	14	21	Zane Smith	GMS Racing	Chevrolet	179	0	running	23
15	32	02	Chris Windom	Young's Motorsports	Chevrolet	179	0	running	0
16	5	42	Carson Hocevar	Niece Motorsports	Chevrolet	179	17	running	37
17	2	26	Tyler Ankrum	GMS Racing	Chevrolet	179	0	running	26
18	39	33	Devon Rouse	Reaume Brothers Racing	Chevrolet	179	0	running	19
19	36	6	Norm Benning	Norm Benning Racing	Chevrolet	179	0	running	18
20	6	13	Johnny Sauter	ThorSport Racing	Toyota	179	8	running	17
21	4	1	Hailie Deegan	David Gilliland Racing	Ford	179	0	running	16
22	24	41	Cody Erickson	Cram Racing Enterprises	Chevrolet	177	0	running	15
23	8	20	Kyle Strickler	Young's Motorsports	Chevrolet	177	0	running	14
24	29	49	Andrew Gordon	CMI Motorsports	Toyota	177	0	running	13
25	40	10	Jennifer Jo Cobb	Jennifer Jo Cobb Racing	Chevrolet	176	0	running	12
26	25	62	Jessica Friesen	Halmar Friesen Racing	Toyota	175	0	running	0
27	19	52	Stewart Friesen	Halmar Friesen Racing	Toyota	170	0	running	14
28	11	25	Josh Berry	Rackley W.A.R.	Chevrolet	163	0	accident	0
29	7	3	Parker Price-Miller	Jordan Anderson Racing	Chevrolet	160	0	running	8
30	21	22	Austin Wayne Self	AM Racing	Chevrolet	159	0	accident	7
31	27	15	Tanner Gray	David Gilliland Racing	Ford	153	0	accident	6
32	22	17	Donny Schatz	David Gilliland Racing	Ford	153	0	accident	5
33	30	23	Chase Purdy	GMS Racing	Chevrolet	153	0	accident	4
34	38	9	Codie Rohrbaugh	CR7 Motorsports	Chevrolet	153	0	accident	3
35	16	2	Sheldon Creed	GMS Racing	Chevrolet	153	0	accident	7
36	12	04	Chase Briscoe	Roper Racing	Ford	153	0	accident	0
37	33	45	Jett Noland	Niece Motorsports	Chevrolet	151	0	accident	1
38	17	37	Brett Moffitt	AM Racing	Chevrolet	139	0	accident	0
39	20	24	Jack Wood	GMS Racing	Chevrolet	91	0	accident	1
40	35	44	Morgan Alexander	Niece Motorsports	Chevrolet	63	0	accident	1
Official race results

Previous race: 2021 CRC Brakleen 150	NASCAR Camping World Truck Series; 2021 season	Next race: 2021 United Rentals 176 at The Glen
