= Knoxville Raceway =

Racetrack

Sprint Car Capital of the World
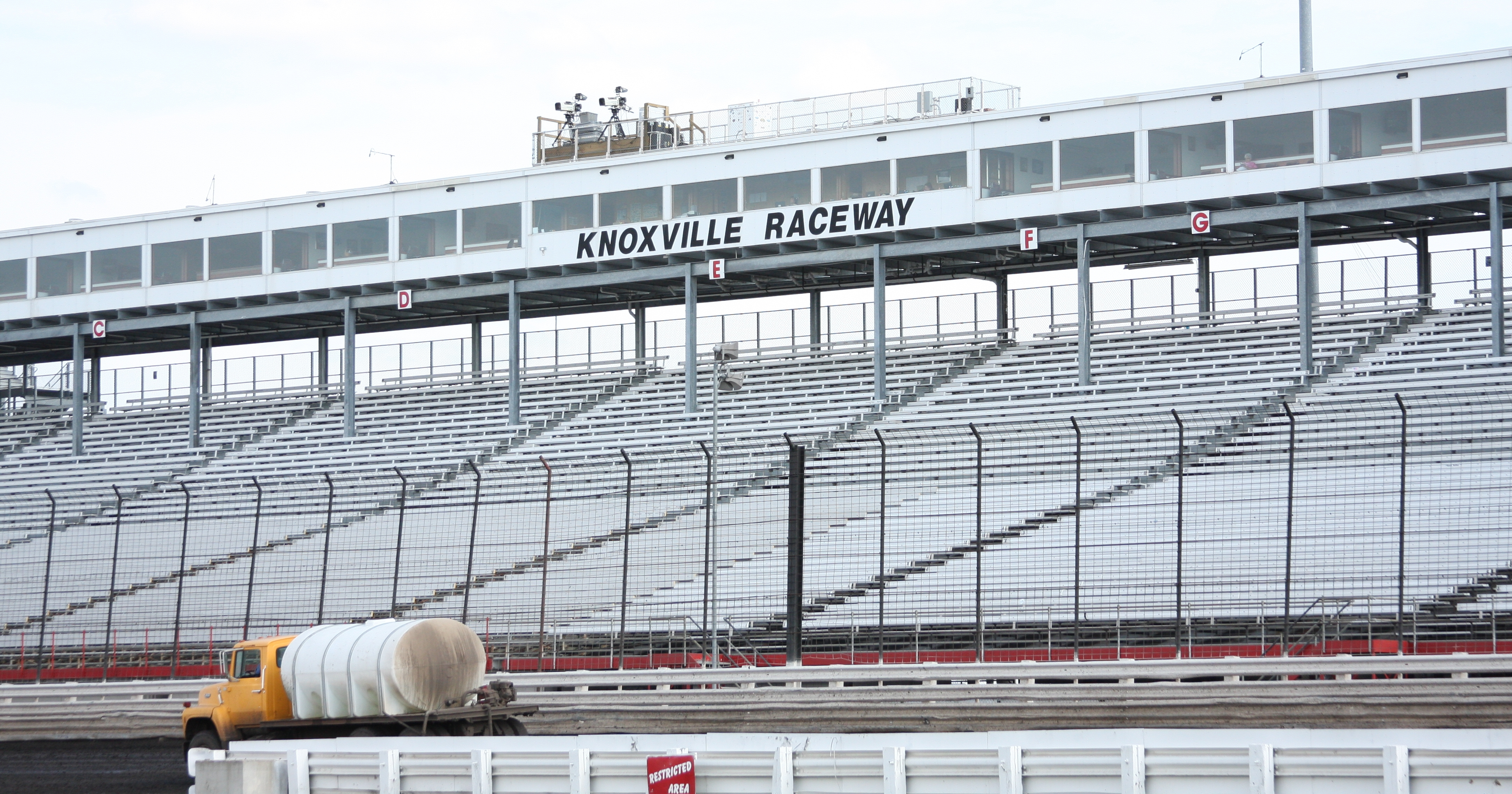
- Location: Knoxville, Iowa
- Coordinates: 41°19′38.97″N 93°6′42.27″W
- Capacity: 21,135
- Owner: Marion County Fair Association
- Operator: Marion County Fair Association
- Opened: 1878 as horse racing track
- Major events: Current: Knoxville Nationals (1961–2019, 2021–present); Former: NASCAR Camping World Truck Series; Clean Harbors 150 (2021–2022); Superstar Racing Experience (2021)
- Website: http://www.knoxvilleraceway.com/

Oval (1878–present)
- Surface: Dirt
- Length: 0.500 mi (0.805 km)
- Banking: 7°
- Race lap record: 14.351 (Brian Brown, Brian Brown Racing, May 22, 2021)

Knoxville Raceway is a semi-banked half-mile dirt oval raceway (zook clay) located at the Marion County Fairgrounds in Knoxville, Iowa. Races at the "Sprint Car Capital of the World" are held on Saturday nights from April through September each year. Some special events such as the Knoxville Nationals, 360 Knoxville Nationals and Late Model Knoxville Nationals are multi-day events. Weekly racing events at the track features multiple classes of sprint cars including 410 cubic inch, 360 cubic inch and Pro Sprints (previously 305 cubic inch). Each August, the Raceway holds the paramount sprint car event in the United States, the Knoxville Nationals. The track is governed by the 24-member fair board elected by Marion County residents.

== History ==
The first weekly races were held at the Knoxville Raceway in 1954. After internal issues with the sanctioning body—the Southern Iowa Stock Car Racing Association—in 1956, Marion Robinson of Des Moines, Iowa was appointed as race promoter. During Robinson's tenure, the cars progressed from stock cars to modifieds to supermodifieds to sprint cars. Robinson created what would become the Knoxville Nationals in 1961. The event took place over two days and featured a $5,000 purse where today it is now nearly one million dollars.

=== Timeline ===
- 1878 – Race track is built for horse racing.
- 1901 – First automobile race staged with 2 cars owned by Well's Manufacturing and Tone's Spices Co.
- 1914 – First race.
- 1917 – Old wooden grandstand was built (2,000 capacity).
- Until late 1930s: Infield is used for Knoxville high school football games.
- 1950–1954 – Stock car racing becomes popular after WWII and a few races per year are sanctioned by Newton Stock Car Association.
- 1954 – Weekly racing begins. Banking, fencing, and lights are added to the track.
- 1955 – Weekly racing sanctioned under the Oskaloosa's Southern Iowa Stock Car Racing Association.
- 1956 – Marion County Fair Board begins sanctioning its own racing and hires Marion Robinson as race promoter.
- 1959 – Wooden bleachers were added to the west of existing grandstand. (5,000)
- 1961 – First Knoxville Nationals held, and won by Roy Robbins.
- 1969 – Wood grandstand was razed.
- 1970 – New steel and aluminum grandstand. (8,139 seats)
- 1974 – Promoter Marion Robinson leaves May 1974.
- 1974 – P. Ray Grimes named promoter, later expands the Nationals to 4 days and creates Nationals scoring point system.
- 1978 – Remainder of wooden bleachers replaced with steel and aluminum.
- 1978 – Ralph Capitani named Race Director and Promoter.
- 1981 – New lighting.
- 1982 – Wings on sprint cars becomes mandated for safety.
- 1983 – 360 sprint cars begin competing.
- 1984 – Grandstands expanded to higher rows in sections A-J.
- 1987 – First year Nationals were on TNN television.
- 1987 – Grandstand expansion completed upper tier in sections K-N (11,584).
- 1990 – Temporary seating added to backstretch for Nationals.
- 1991 – NSCHoF&M built (400 additional seats).
- 1991 – Backstretch permanent grandstand added, Sections P-Z (17,224).
- 1991 – First year of 360 Nationals.
- 1994 – Backstretch grandstand expanded, sections P-ZZ (19,400).
- 1995 – Knoxville Nationals broadcast live for first time on TNN.
- 1996 – Main grandstand upper tier addition, VIP suites, new Musco Lighting. (23,200).
- 2002 – Concrete added to infield pit area.
- 2003 – Main grandstand sections AA & BB refitted, added handicap seating (24,192).
- 2004 – First year of Late Model Knoxville Nationals.
- 2010 – First points season for 305 sprint cars.
- 2011 – Ralph Capitani retires at the end of the 2011 season.
- 2012 – Toby Kruse named GM & Promoter, John McCoy named Race Director.
- 2013 – Brian Stickel named GM & Promoter.
- 2014 – New video boards added by Impact Signs.
- 2015 – McKenna Haase became the first woman to win a feature Sprint Car race at Knoxville Raceway.
- 2015 – GM Brian Stickel resigns.
- 2016 – John McCoy given the Promoter and Race Director title. Gary Schumacher named as Business Manager. Spire Sports + Entertainment's Kendra Jacobs, named as Marketing Director.
- 2017 – Additional fencing constructed in turns 1 and 2
- 2018 – Seats were widened during the off season, eliminating 3,320 seats from the main grandstand and lowering the overall seating capacity to 21,135.
- 2021 – The track hosted a NASCAR Camping World Truck Series race on July 9, the Corn Belt 150. It was the first race at the track to ever be sanctioned by NASCAR. On September 29, 2021, NASCAR announced that the Truck Series would return for the 2022 season as the full schedule was released for the series.

== Track records ==
- The driver with the most 410 feature wins at the Knoxville Raceway is Danny Lasoski of Dover, Missouri with 112 feature wins.
- The driver with the most 360 feature wins is David Hesmer of Marshalltown, Iowa with 65 feature wins.
- The driver with the most consecutive wins is Doug Wolfgang of Sioux Falls, SD with 10 wins to start the 1977 season. He won 13 of the 18 events that year including the Knoxville Nationals.

=== One-lap track records ===
Category	Lap Time	Driver	Date	Average Lap Speed
410 Wing Sprint Car	0:14.351	Brian Brown	May 22, 2021	125 mph
360 Wing Sprint Car	0:15.520	Joe Beaver	June 15, 2013	115.979 mph (186.650 km/h)
Late Model	0:16.631	Earl Pearson, Jr.	September 25, 2008	108.231 mph (174.180 km/h)
305/Pro Sprints Wing Sprint Car	0:16.736	Christian Bowman	May 7, 2016	107.552 mph (173.088 km/h)
Non-Wing Sprint Car	0:18.549	Kevin Thomas Jr.	June 3, 2017	97.040 mph (156.170 km/h)
Midget	0:22.22	Bob Wente	N/A	81.008 mph (130.369 km/h)
IMCA Modified	0:22.932	John Moore	N/A	78.492 mph (126.320 km/h)

== Sprint car track champions ==
Knoxville Championship Cup Series Driver Champions
Year	410 Class	360 Class	305/Pro Sprints Class
2022	Brian Brown	Terry McCarl	Mike Mayberry
2021	Davey Heskin	Clint Garner	Tyler Groenendyk
2020	Brian Brown	Carson McCarl	Matthew Stelzer
2019	Brian Brown	Carson McCarl	Matthew Stelzer
2018	Austin McCarl	Clint Garner	Eric Bridger
2017	Ian Madsen	Matt Moro	Eric Bridger
2016	Danny Lasoski	Clint Garner	Christian Bowman
2015	Danny Lasoski	Clint Garner	Stacey Alexander
2014	Ian Madsen	Joe Beaver	J Kinder
2013	Bronson Maeschen	Clint Garner	Larry Ball Jr.
2012	Terry McCarl	Clint Garner	Matthew Stelzer
2011	Danny Lasoski	Clint Garner	Carson McCarl
2010	Brian Brown	Clint Garner	Steve Breazeale
2009	Johnny Herrera	Clint Garner	Matthew Stelzer
2008	Danny Lasoski	Matt Moro	
2007	Brian Brown	Josh Higday	
2006	Billy Alley	Jake Peters	
2005	Kerry Madsen	Jake Peters	
2004	Terry McCarl	Jake Peters	
2003	Terry McCarl	Billy Alley	
2002	Terry McCarl	Brian Brown	
2001	Terry McCarl	Randy Martin	
2000	Terry McCarl	John Kearney	
1999	Terry McCarl	David Hesmer	
1998	Skip Jackson	David Hesmer	
1997	Skip Jackson	David Hesmer	
1996	Danny Lasoski	Randy Martin	
1995	Johnny Herrera	Larry Pinegar II	
1994	Danny Lasoski	Lee Nelson	
1993	Danny Lasoski	Danny Young	
1992	Danny Lasoski	Dwight Snodgrass	
1991	Randy Smith	Dwight Snodgrass	
1990	Danny Lasoski	Jordan Albaugh	
1989	Danny Lasoski	Mike Twedt	
1988	Randy Smith	David Hesmer	
1987	Randy Smith	Mike Chadd	
1986	Danny Lasoski	Wayne Redmond	
1985	Randy Smith	Dean Chadd	
1984	Rocky Hodges	Stacey Redmond	
1983	Randy Smith	Mackie Heimbaugh	
1982	Tim Green		
1981	Tim Green		
1980	Ricky Hood		
1979	Richard Smith		
1978	Shane Carson		
1977	Doug Wolfgang		
1976	Doug Wolfgang		
1975	Roger Rager		
1974	Lonnie Jensen		
1973	Dick Sutcliffe		
1972	Lonnie Jensen		
1971	Ray Lee Goodwin		
1970	Joe Saldana		
1969	Bob Williams		
1968	Dick Sutcliffe		
1967	Bill Utz		
1966	Jerry Blundy		
1965	Jerry Blundy		
1964	Bill Utz		
1963	Greg Weld		
1962	Bud McCune		
1961	Earl Wagner		
1960	Jerry Hayes		
1959	Earl Wagner		
1958	Earl Wagner		
1957	Dean Sylvester		
1956	Jack Delano		
1955	Kenny Crook		
1954	Kenny Crook		

== National Sprint Car Hall of Fame & Museum ==
The National Sprint Car Hall of Fame & Museum is located just outside Turn 2 of the Knoxville Raceway. It features rotating exhibits to highlight the history of both winged and non-wing sprint cars.
