= 2021 SRX Series =

Inaugural season of the Superstar Racing Experience

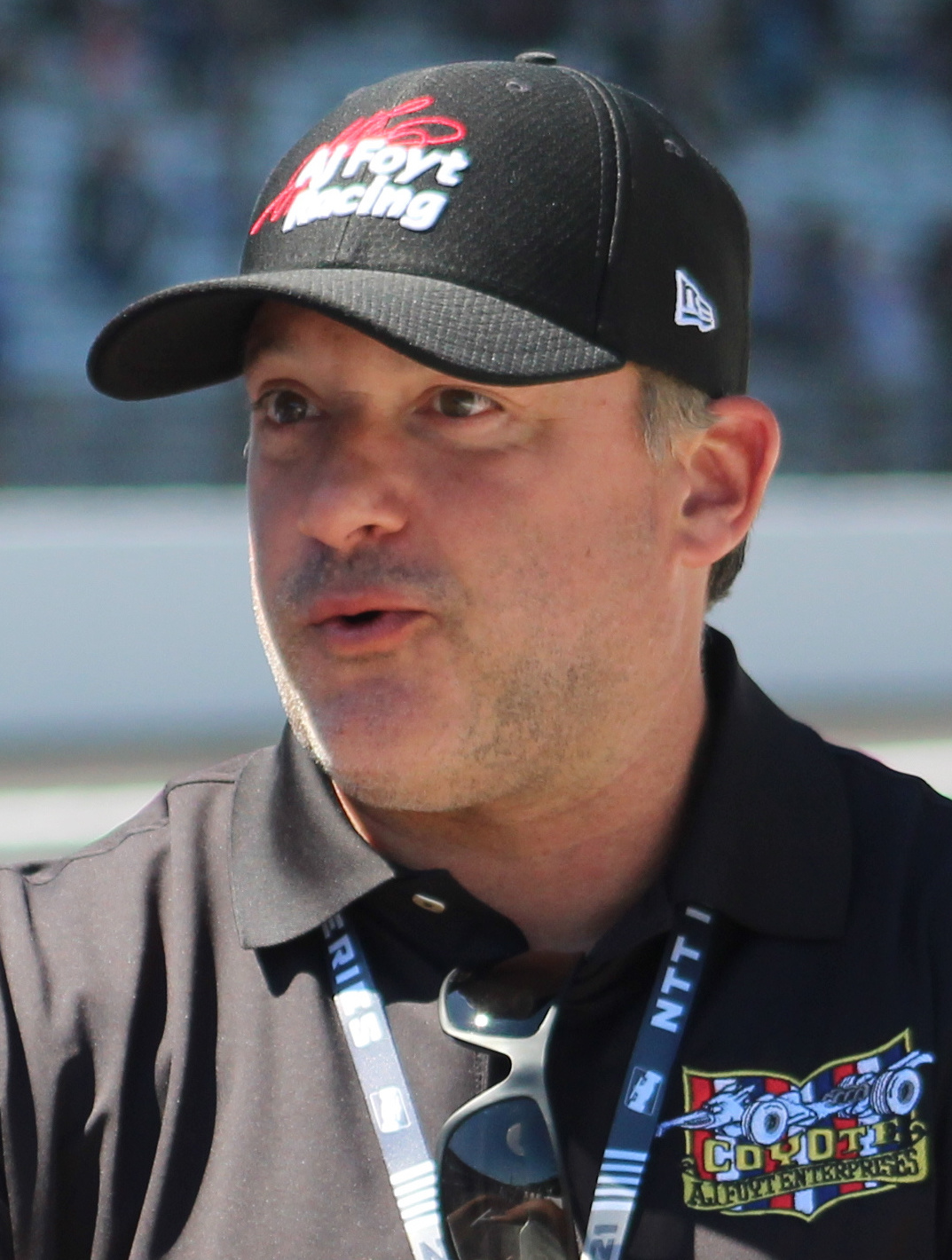
Tony Stewart, the 2021 series champion.

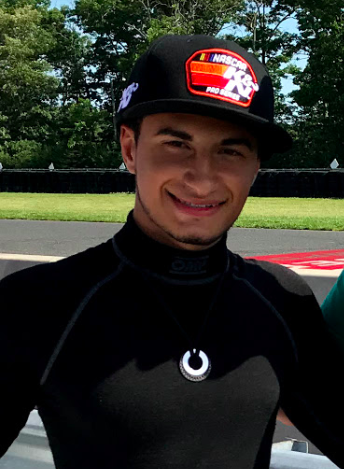
Ernie Francis Jr. finished second behind Stewart in the championship by 45 points.

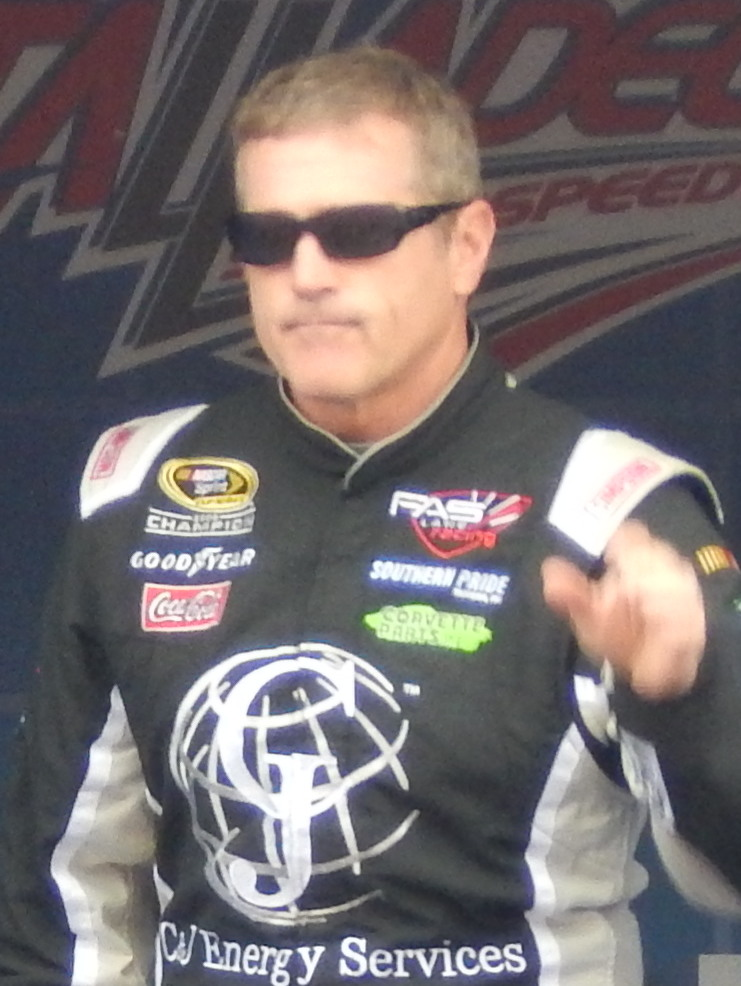
Bobby Labonte finished third in the championship.

The 2021 Camping World SRX Series was the inaugural season of the Superstar Racing Experience. The six-race season started at Stafford Motor Speedway on June 12 and ended at the Nashville Fairgrounds Speedway on July 17, with Tony Stewart being crowned the inaugural series champion.

== Drivers ==
=== Full-time drivers ===
No.	Driver	Primary series	Accomplishments	Ref
2	(United States) Ernie Francis Jr.	Trans-Am Series	Seven-time consecutive Trans-Am Series champion (2014 through 2020)	
3	(Brazil) Hélio Castroneves	IndyCar Series	2001, 2002, 2009, and 2021 Indianapolis 500 winner 2020 WeatherTech SportsCar Championship champion 2021 24 Hours of Daytona winner	
9	(United States) Bill Elliott	NASCAR Cup Series	1985 and 1987 Daytona 500 winner 1988 NASCAR Cup Series champion	
13	(Canada) Paul Tracy	IndyCar Series	1990 American Racing Series champion 2003 Champ Car World Series champion	
14	(United States) Tony Stewart	NASCAR Cup Series	1996–97 IndyCar Series champion 2002, 2005, and 2011 NASCAR Cup Series champion	
15	(United States) Michael Waltrip	NASCAR Cup Series	1983 NASCAR Darlington Dash Series champion 2001 and 2003 Daytona 500 winner	
17	(United States) Willy T. Ribbs	Trans-Am Series	1977 Dunlop/Autosport Star of Tomorrow Formula Ford 1600 champion 17-time Trans-Am Series race winner	
18	(United States) Bobby Labonte	NASCAR Cup Series	1991 NASCAR Xfinity Series champion 2000 NASCAR Cup Series champion	
98	(United States) Marco Andretti	IndyCar Series	2003 Barber Formula Dodge Eastern class champion 2004 Barber Formula Dodge Barber National class and Southern class champion Two-time IndyCar race winner	

=== Part-time drivers ===
No.	Driver	Primary series	Track	Accomplishments
00	(United States) Scott Bloomquist	Lucas Oil Late Model Dirt Series	Knoxville Raceway	94 Lucas Oil Late Model and 33 World of Outlaws wins
1	(United States) Hailie Deegan	NASCAR Camping World Truck Series	Knoxville Raceway, Slinger Speedway, Nashville Fairgrounds Speedway	2020 ARCA Menards Series Rookie of the Year; First female winner in the ARCA Menards Series West
41	(United States) Scott Speed	Rallycross	Eldora Speedway, Lucas Oil Raceway	Three-time Global Rallycross champion 2019 Americas Rallycross champion
48	(Brazil) Tony Kanaan	IndyCar Series	Stafford Speedway, Eldora Speedway, Lucas Oil Raceway, Nashville Fairgrounds Speedway	2004 IndyCar Series champion 2013 Indianapolis 500 winner
69	(United States) Greg Biffle	NASCAR Cup Series	Stafford Speedway, Slinger Speedway	56 NASCAR national series wins 2000 NASCAR Truck Series champion 2002 NASCAR Busch Series champion

=== Guest drivers ===
No.	Driver	Track	Accomplishments
4	(United States) Luke Fenhaus	Slinger Speedway	2021 Slinger Nationals winner
10	(United States) Doug Coby	Stafford Motor Speedway	Six-time NASCAR Whelen Modified Tour champion
21	(United States) Brian Brown	Knoxville Raceway	Four-time track champion
22	(United States) Bobby Santos III	Lucas Oil Raceway	USAC race winner and NASCAR Whelen Modified Tour champion
63	(United States) Kody Swanson	Eldora Speedway	Five-time USAC Silver Crown winner
94	(United States) Chase Elliott	Nashville Fairgrounds Speedway	2020 NASCAR Cup Series champion 2014 NASCAR Nationwide Series champion NASCAR Cup Series Most Popular Driver (2018–2024)

=== Notes ===
- Nine-time Formula One race winner and 2015 FIA World Endurance Championship champion Mark Webber was initially announced as a full-time driver, but travel restrictions and schedule changes related to the COVID-19 pandemic forced those plans to be cancelled.
- Tony Kanaan was initially supposed to run all six races. However, due to scheduling conflicts with the 2021 Stock Car Brasil Championship, he did not participate in the races at Knoxville and Slinger and was replaced by Hailie Deegan in both of those races.

== Schedule ==
Stewart's track Eldora Speedway was the first venue to be revealed, on November 13, 2020. Two more tracks were announced in December, with Lucas Oil Raceway in suburban Indianapolis on December 9 and Stafford Motor Speedway in Connecticut on December 19. The full schedule was released on January 4, 2021.

No.	Track	Location	Type	Date	TV	Ratings (Mil)
1	Stafford Motor Speedway	Stafford Springs, Connecticut	0.5 mile, paved	June 12	CBS	1.30
2	Knoxville Raceway	Knoxville, Iowa	0.5 mile, dirt	June 19	CBS	1.23
3	Eldora Speedway	New Weston, Ohio	0.5 mile, dirt	June 26	CBS	1.37
4	Lucas Oil Raceway	Brownsburg, Indiana	0.686 mile, paved	July 3	CBS	1.07
5	Slinger Speedway	Slinger, Wisconsin	0.25 mile, paved	July 10	CBS	1.28
6	Nashville Fairgrounds Speedway	Nashville, Tennessee	0.596 mile, paved	July 17	CBS	1.27

=== Broadcasting ===
All six races were broadcast live by CBS in the United States and were also streamed on Paramount+. The broadcast team consisted of former NASCAR on NBC and NASCAR on ESPN play-by-play Allen Bestwick along with a rotating color commentator (Dario Franchitti (1 race), James Hinchcliffe (3 races) and Danica Patrick (2 races) in the booth. Former ESPN and NBC studio analyst Brad Daugherty and former NASCAR on Fox pit reporter Matt Yocum were the two pit reporters. Former NASCAR on TNT pit reporter and NASCAR Race Hub studio host Lindsay Czarniak was the host.

== Season summary ==
All events consist of two heat races, with the lineup for Heat 1 being determined by a random draw. The results of Heat 1 are inverted to determine the lineup for Heat 2. At Stafford, the heat races were 15 minutes each, but were shortened to 12 minutes for Knoxville onwards. The results of the second heat determined the lineup for the feature race at Stafford; the average finish of both heats was used from Knoxville onwards.

At Stafford, the feature race had a duration of 100 laps, including caution period laps, with unlimited attempts at a green–white–checker finish. For Knoxville and Eldora, the duration was changed from 100 laps to 50 green-flag-only laps. Lucas Oil had a 76-lap feature, with Slinger showcasing a 150-lap main event and Nashville's feature lasting 77 laps.

=== Stafford Motor Speedway ===
Greg Biffle won the pole for Heat 1 based on a random draw. He held on to win the heat over Bobby Labonte at the end of the 15-minute time limit, leading all 36 laps. The field was inverted for the second 15-minute heat, with Doug Coby passing Michael Waltrip for the win with two to go. Coby, a real estate agent who participates in Modified races in the Northeast, then led 84 laps of the 100-lap feature, winning the event ahead of Biffle and Tony Stewart.

Heat 1 Top 5 Results:

Pos	No.	Driver
1	69	Greg Biffle
2	18	Bobby Labonte
3	3	Hélio Castroneves
4	2	Ernie Francis Jr.
5	48	Tony Kanaan

Heat 2 Top 5 Results:

Pos	No.	Driver
1	10	Doug Coby
2	15	Michael Waltrip
3	14	Tony Stewart
4	9	Bill Elliott
5	2	Ernie Francis Jr.

Feature Top 5 Results:

Pos	No.	Driver
1	10	Doug Coby
2	69	Greg Biffle
3	14	Tony Stewart
4	3	Hélio Castroneves
5	18	Bobby Labonte

=== Knoxville Raceway ===
Tony Stewart started on pole for heat 1 and led for the entire 12-minute session, which consisted of 23 laps. Michael Waltrip and Willy T. Ribbs started up front for the second heat. Hélio Castroneves passed for the lead early and led until three minutes left, getting passed by Scott Bloomquist on a restart. The heat was extended due to a green-white-checker finish after Paul Tracy spun and hit the wall with 40 seconds left; Bloomquist went on to win. Stewart started on the pole for the 50-lap feature, based on average finishing positions from the two heats. Paul Tracy fell out early after overheating, and several cautions flew for spins during the first quarter of the race. Waltrip passed Stewart for the lead on lap 14; Stewart regained the lead on lap 21. Bloomquist was spun by Castroneves on lap 33, bringing out another caution; Bill Elliott stalled on track during the caution and was pushed to pit road, falling eleven laps behind. Stewart held off Hailie Deegan and Ernie Francis Jr. to win.

Heat 1 Top 5 Results:

Pos	No.	Driver
1	14	Tony Stewart
2	98	Marco Andretti
3	1	Hailie Deegan
4	2	Ernie Francis Jr.
5	13	Paul Tracy

Heat 2 Top 5 Results:

Pos	No.	Driver
1	00	Scott Bloomquist
2	2	Ernie Francis Jr.
3	15	Michael Waltrip
4	14	Tony Stewart
5	1	Hailie Deegan

Feature Top 5 Results:

Pos	No.	Driver
1	14	Tony Stewart
2	1	Hailie Deegan
3	2	Ernie Francis Jr.
4	3	Hélio Castroneves
5	15	Michael Waltrip

=== Eldora Speedway ===
Tony Kanaan started at the front for the first 12-minute heat and led for the first four minutes before being passed by Tony Stewart, who went on to win the heat after holding off a late challenge from Hélio Castroneves. The second heat was marred by accidents and completed only 11 green-flag laps before the time limit. Willy T. Ribbs began up front following the field inversion, leading the first three laps. While battling for second Ernie Francis Jr. spun Kanaan, also collecting Michael Waltrip and Kody Swanson and causing Stewart to spin. Francis, Waltrip, and Swanson all failed to finish the heat. The race restarted with six minutes remaining, with Marco Andretti battling Scott Speed for the lead. Ribbs spun Paul Tracy on the backstretch, collecting himself, Kanaan, and Stewart. Speed and Andretti continued to battle on the ensuing restart with two minutes left; Andretti went on to win ahead of Tracy and Stewart, both of whom recovered from earlier spins.

Stewart started on pole for the feature but elected to drop to the back during the pace laps. Second-place starter Paul Tracy led the first 25 laps of the 50-lap race. Two cautions flew in the first half of the race, including one for a spinning Tony Kanaan. Kody Swanson took over the lead on lap 26 until the third caution on lap 34. Tracy retook the lead on the restart and led two laps before relinquishing the top spot back to Swanson. Stewart took the lead on lap 44, and on lap 46 third-place Bobby Labonte was spun by Tracy in turn one, collecting Marco Andretti and Bill Elliott. Labonte and Elliott failed to finish the race. Stewart and Swanson battled on a restart with five laps left, with Stewart ultimately winning the feature.

Heat 1 Top 5 Results:

Pos	No.	Driver
1	14	Tony Stewart
2	3	Hélio Castroneves
3	13	Paul Tracy
4	98	Marco Andretti
5	18	Bobby Labonte

Heat 2 Top 5 Results:

Pos	No.	Driver
1	98	Marco Andretti
2	13	Paul Tracy
3	14	Tony Stewart
4	41	Scott Speed
5	18	Bobby Labonte

Feature Top 5 Results:

Pos	No.	Driver
1	14	Tony Stewart
2	63	Kody Swanson
3	3	Hélio Castroneves
4	98	Marco Andretti
5	13	Paul Tracy

=== Lucas Oil Raceway ===
Scott Speed started on pole for the first heat alongside Michael Waltrip. Speed went on to win after leading the entire heat. Willy T. Ribbs started up front for the second heat, but Paul Tracy took the lead at the start, leading for the first two minutes. Hélio Castroneves passed for the top spot and led the remainder of the heat, followed by Bobby Labonte, who passed Tony Stewart with two laps to go.

Unlike the previous two races with 50-lap features during which caution laps did not count, the feature at Lucas Oil was 76 laps, with caution laps counting except during the final six laps. Stewart started on the pole but was passed by Speed on lap 2. Ernie Francis Jr. passed Stewart for second and took over the lead from Speed on lap 13. The first caution flew on lap 27 due to the series' "green flag lap limit". After the restart on lap 34, Francis quickly pulled away from Speed, the pair leading the way until another caution flew at lap 49. Francis retained the lead on the lap 55 restart, ahead of Speed, Labonte, and Castroneves. The third caution flew on lap 67, and Speed took over the lead on the restart. With seven laps to go, Tony Kanaan spun on the backstretch, resulting in a fourth caution. Francis and Speed battled side by side for three laps before Speed slid into the wall. With two laps remaining, Tracy was spun by Bobby Santos III in turn 2 and Speed was spun into the wall by Castroneves in turn 3 in retaliation for contact the lap before. On the first green-white-checker attempt, Francis cleared Labonte and went on to win.

Heat 1 Top 5 Results:

Pos	No.	Driver
1	41	Scott Speed
2	48	Tony Kanaan
3	15	Michael Waltrip
4	14	Tony Stewart
5	22	Bobby Santos III

Heat 2 Top 5 Results:

Pos	No.	Driver
1	3	Hélio Castroneves
2	18	Bobby Labonte
3	14	Tony Stewart
4	2	Ernie Francis Jr.
5	98	Marco Andretti

Feature Top 5 Results:

Pos	No.	Driver
1	2	Ernie Francis Jr.
2	18	Bobby Labonte
3	41	Scott Speed
4	98	Marco Andretti
5	22	Bobby Santos III

=== Slinger Speedway ===
Marco Andretti drew the pole position for the first 12-minute heat. With two minutes remaining, sixth-place Paul Tracy was spun by Ernie Francis Jr. Tracy's right-front tire went flat on the restart, bringing out another caution as time expired. Andretti went on to win after holding off Tony Stewart on the ensuing restart. Willy T. Ribbs began the second heat up front, but spun about 20 seconds into the race, leaving Bill Elliott with the lead. Hailie Deegan took the lead on the restart, but another caution quickly waved after Michael Waltrip was rear-ended by Hélio Castroneves. Deegan jumped out to a large lead on the restart, leading until another caution waves with five minutes remaining. Greg Biffle took the lead with two minutes left and went on to win while holding off Deegan and Francis.

Andretti and Luke Fenhaus made up the front row for the 150-lap feature and battled side by side for the lead until Fenhaus prevailed on lap 24. Stewart took the lead briefly on lap 32 but was held off by Fenhaus. After battling side-by-side, Fenhaus prevailed over Stewart just before a caution came out at lap 45. After the lap 54 restart, Fenhaus and Stewart swapped the lead several times before Stewart prevailed at lap 76. Fenhaus then regained the lead at lap 80, and the two continued battling side by side. A caution flew at lap 92 with Stewart gaining the edge over Fenhaus and Andretti. After the restart ten laps later, Fenhaus took the lead, and a caution waved for Michael Waltrip a few laps later. Following the restart at lap 112, Stewart and Fenhaus battled for the lead as Francis, Tracy, and Deegan made contact multiple times back in the field. The leaders continued to race side-by-side before Fenhaus again prevailed on lap 132. After a caution flew at lap 135, the race began to only count green-flag laps. Biffle and Castroneves spun on the restart with 12 laps remaining. Fenhaus and Andretti cleared Stewart with ten to go, and a caution flew with two laps left when Deegan spun Tracy while racing for fourth, with Tracy collecting Waltrip, Ribbs, and Castroneves. Tracy and Waltrip failed to finish the feature. Andretti passed Fenhaus on the green-white-checker restart and went on to win ahead of Fenhaus and Stewart.

Heat 1 Top 5 Results:

Pos	No.	Driver
1	98	Marco Andretti
2	14	Tony Stewart
3	4	Luke Fenhaus
4	18	Bobby Labonte
5	3	Hélio Castroneves

Heat 2 Top 5 Results:

Pos	No.	Driver
1	69	Greg Biffle
2	1	Hailie Deegan
3	2	Ernie Francis Jr.
4	4	Luke Fenhaus
5	14	Tony Stewart

Feature Top 5 Results:

Pos	No.	Driver
1	98	Marco Andretti
2	4	Luke Fenhaus
3	14	Tony Stewart
4	1	Hailie Deegan
5	18	Bobby Labonte

=== Nashville Fairgrounds Speedway ===
Bill Elliott and Chase Elliott started on the front row for heat 1. Bill led for the majority off the heat, fending off a late challenge from Chase to win. For heat 2, Willy T. Ribbs and Michael Waltrip started up front. Waltrip led the first six laps before Hélio Castroneves took over the top spot. He went on to win the heat ahead of Ernie Francis Jr. Tony Stewart clinched the series championship after the second heat, maintaining a large enough points lead over Francis.

For the feature, Bill Elliott again started on pole, with Labonte joining him at the front. Elliott maintained the lead over Castroneves until the first caution waved at lap 26. After the restart at lap 32, Elliott maintained the lead, with Chase Elliott moving into second. Bill held off Chase until the second caution of the race flew at lap 50. On the lap 55 restart, Bill ran high in turn two, allowing Chase and Stewart to move into the top spots. The third caution flew on lap 57 when Willy T. Ribbs spun after contact with Paul Tracy. Ribbs failed to finish the feature. Following the lap 61 restart, Chase maintained the lead over Stewart and Bill. The fourth caution flew on lap 71, and the race restarted with seven laps remaining. On lap 73, Paul Tracy spun Marco Andretti from fifth place, the fifteenth incident involving Tracy during the season. Elliott maintained the lead with five laps to go. Elliott went on to win, with Stewart clinching the championship in second, and Bill Elliott finishing third.

Heat 1 Top 5 Results:

Pos	No.	Driver
1	9	Bill Elliott
2	94	Chase Elliott
3	18	Bobby Labonte
4	98	Marco Andretti
5	14	Tony Stewart

Heat 2 Top 5 Results:

Pos	No.	Driver
1	3	Hélio Castroneves
2	2	Ernie Francis Jr.
3	13	Paul Tracy
4	18	Bobby Labonte
5	14	Tony Stewart

Feature Top 5 Results:

Pos	No.	Driver
1	94	Chase Elliott
2	14	Tony Stewart
3	9	Bill Elliott
4	18	Bobby Labonte
5	13	Paul Tracy

== Results and standings ==
=== Race results ===
No.	Track	Heat 1 winner	Heat 2 winner	Most laps led (feature)	Feature race winner
1	Stafford Motor Speedway	Greg Biffle	Doug Coby	Doug Coby	Doug Coby
2	Knoxville Raceway	Tony Stewart	Scott Bloomquist	Tony Stewart	Tony Stewart
3	Eldora Speedway	Tony Stewart	Marco Andretti	Paul Tracy	Tony Stewart
4	Lucas Oil Raceway	Scott Speed	Hélio Castroneves	Ernie Francis Jr.	Ernie Francis Jr.
5	Slinger Speedway	Marco Andretti	Greg Biffle	Luke Fenhaus	Marco Andretti
6	Nashville Fairgrounds Speedway	Bill Elliott	Hélio Castroneves	Bill Elliott	Chase Elliott

=== Drivers' championship ===
(key) * – Most laps led (feature). ^{1} – Heat 1 winner. ^{2} – Heat 2 winner.

Pos.	Driver	STA	KNX	ELD	IRP	SLG	NSV	Pts
1	(United States) Tony Stewart	3	1*^{1}	1^{1}	7	3	2	237
2	(United States) Ernie Francis Jr.	6	3	8	1*	6	6	192
3	(United States) Bobby Labonte	5	6	11	2	5	4	182
4	(United States) Marco Andretti	10	7	4^{2}	4	1^{1}	11	171
5	(Brazil) Hélio Castroneves	4	4	3	9^{2}	10	9^{2}	164
6	(United States) Hailie Deegan		2			4	10	162
6	(Brazil) Tony Kanaan	7		7	10		8	162
7	(Canada) Paul Tracy	9	12	5*	8	11	5	121
8	(United States) Michael Waltrip	11	5	10	6	12	7	111
9	(United States) Bill Elliott	12	11	12	12	9	3*^{1}	105
10	(United States) Willy T. Ribbs	8	10	9	11	7	12	67
11	(United States) Scott Speed			6	3^{1}			64
12	(United States) Greg Biffle	2^{1}				8^{2}		63
13	(United States) Doug Coby	1*^{2}						44
14	(United States) Chase Elliott						1	41
15	(United States) Luke Fenhaus					2*		41
16	(United States) Kody Swanson			2				30
17	(United States) Bobby Santos III				5			28
18	(United States) Scott Bloomquist		9^{2}					23
19	(United States) Brian Brown		8					21

Points are awarded for both heat races as well as the feature:

Points	Position											
Points	1st	2nd	3rd	4th	5th	6th	7th	8th	9th	10th	11th	12th
Heat	12	11	10	9	8	7	6	5	4	3	2	1
Feature	25	22	20	18	16	14	12	10	8	6	4	2

== See also ==
- 2021 NASCAR Cup Series
- 2021 NASCAR Xfinity Series
- 2021 NASCAR Camping World Truck Series
- 2021 IndyCar Series
- 2021 ARCA Menards Series
- 2021 ARCA Menards Series East
- 2021 ARCA Menards Series West
- 2021 NASCAR Whelen Modified Tour
- 2021 NASCAR Pinty's Series
- 2021 NASCAR PEAK Mexico Series
- 2021 NASCAR Whelen Euro Series
- 2021 eNASCAR iRacing Pro Invitational Series
- 2021 Southern Modified Auto Racing Teams season
