= Kyle Busch Motorsports =

American stock car racing team

- Owner: Samantha Busch
- Base: Mooresville, North Carolina
- Series: Late Models; INEX Legend Car Series; Micro Sprints
- Race drivers: Late Models: 18b. Brexton Busch; 51. Kyle Busch; Legend Cars: 18b. Brexton Busch; 51. Kyle Busch; Micro Sprints: 18b. Brexton Busch; 51. Kyle Busch
- Manufacturer: Chevrolet
- Opened: 2010
- Closed: 2023

Career
- Debut: Nationwide Series: 2011 Top Gear 300 (Charlotte); Truck Series: 2010 NextEra Energy Resources 250 (Daytona); ARCA Menards Series: 2022 Lucas Oil 200 (Daytona); ARCA Menards Series East: 2022 Race to Stop Suicide 200 (New Smyrna); ARCA Menards Series West: 2022 General Tire 150 (Phoenix Raceway)
- Latest race: Nationwide Series: 2013 Ford EcoBoost 300 (Homestead); Truck Series: 2023 NASCAR Craftsman Truck Series Championship Race (Phoenix); ARCA Menards Series: 2022 Shore Lunch 200 (Toledo); ARCA Menards Series East: 2022 Bush's Beans 200 (Bristol); ARCA Menards Series West: 2022 Desert Diamond Casino West Valley 100 (Phoenix)
- Races competed: Total: 418; Nationwide Series: 67; Truck Series: 322; ARCA Series: 20; ARCA East Series: 7 ARCA West Series: 2
- Drivers' Championships: Total: 3 Nationwide Series: 0 Truck Series: 2; 2015, 2017; ARCA Series: 0 ARCA East Series: 1; 2022; ARCA West Series: 0
- Race victories: Total: 113; Nationwide Series: 1 Truck Series: 100; ARCA Series: 6 ARCA East Series: 5 ARCA West Series: 1
- Pole positions: Total: 86; Nationwide Series: 3 Truck Series: 70; ARCA Series: 8 ARCA East Series: 3 ARCA West Series: 2

Kyle Busch Motorsports (KBM) is an American professional auto racing team that competes in various paved short track and dirt racing divisions across the United States.

They formerly competed in the NASCAR Craftsman Truck Series, NASCAR Xfinity Series, CARS Tour, ARCA/CRA Super Series, Southern Super Series, ARCA Menards Series, ARCA Menards Series East, and ARCA Menards Series West, and was also the parent company of Super Late Model chassis constructor Rowdy Manufacturing. Originally fielding Toyota Tundras since its inception, the team switched to Chevrolet Silverados beginning in 2023. The team last fielded two full-time Chevrolet Silverados: the No. 4 for Chase Purdy and the No. 51, which was driven each year by the team owner Kyle Busch along with Jack Wood and multiple Chevrolet drivers from other NASCAR series.

== History ==
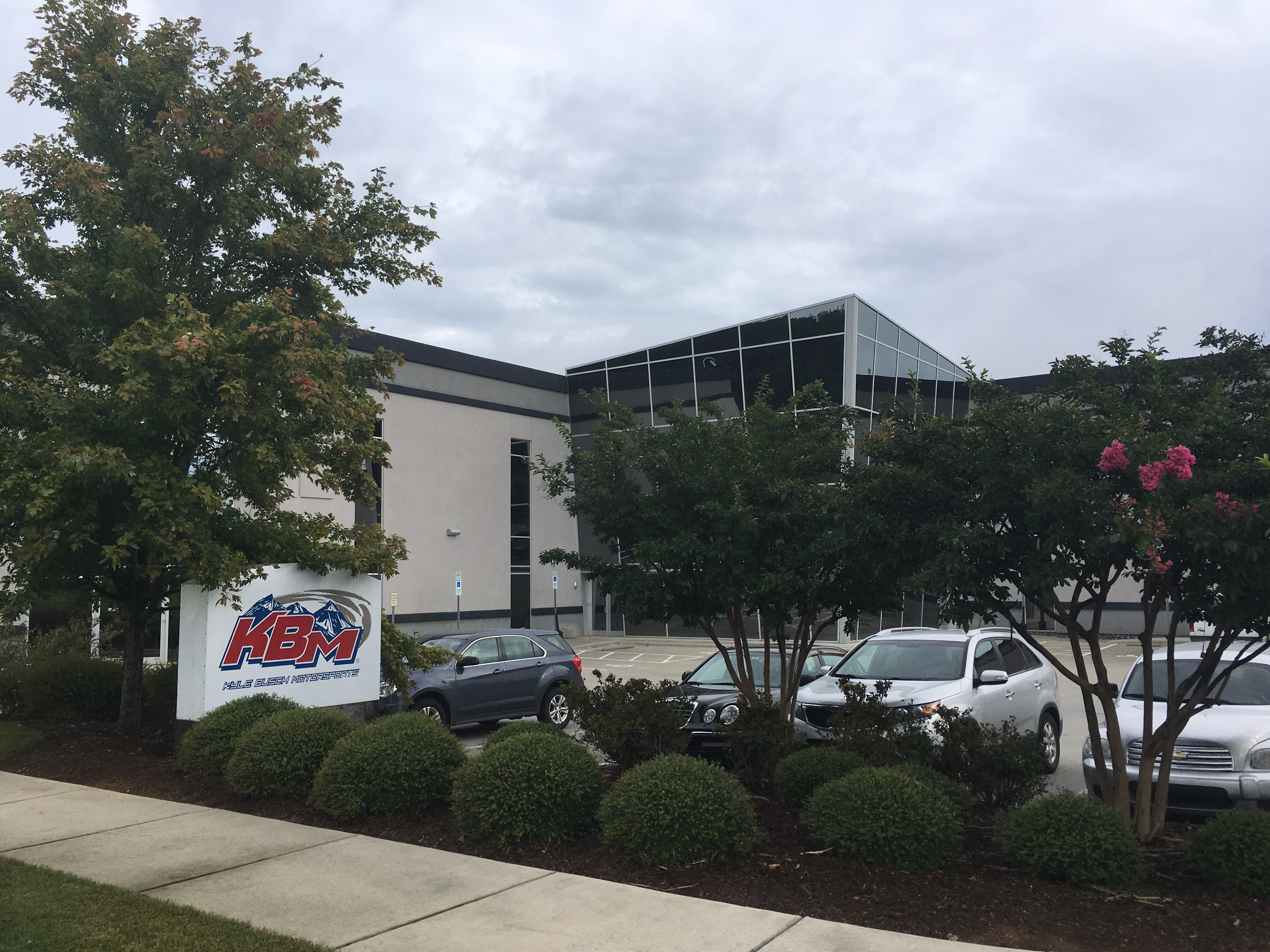
The Kyle Busch Motorsports former race shop in Mooresville, North Carolina

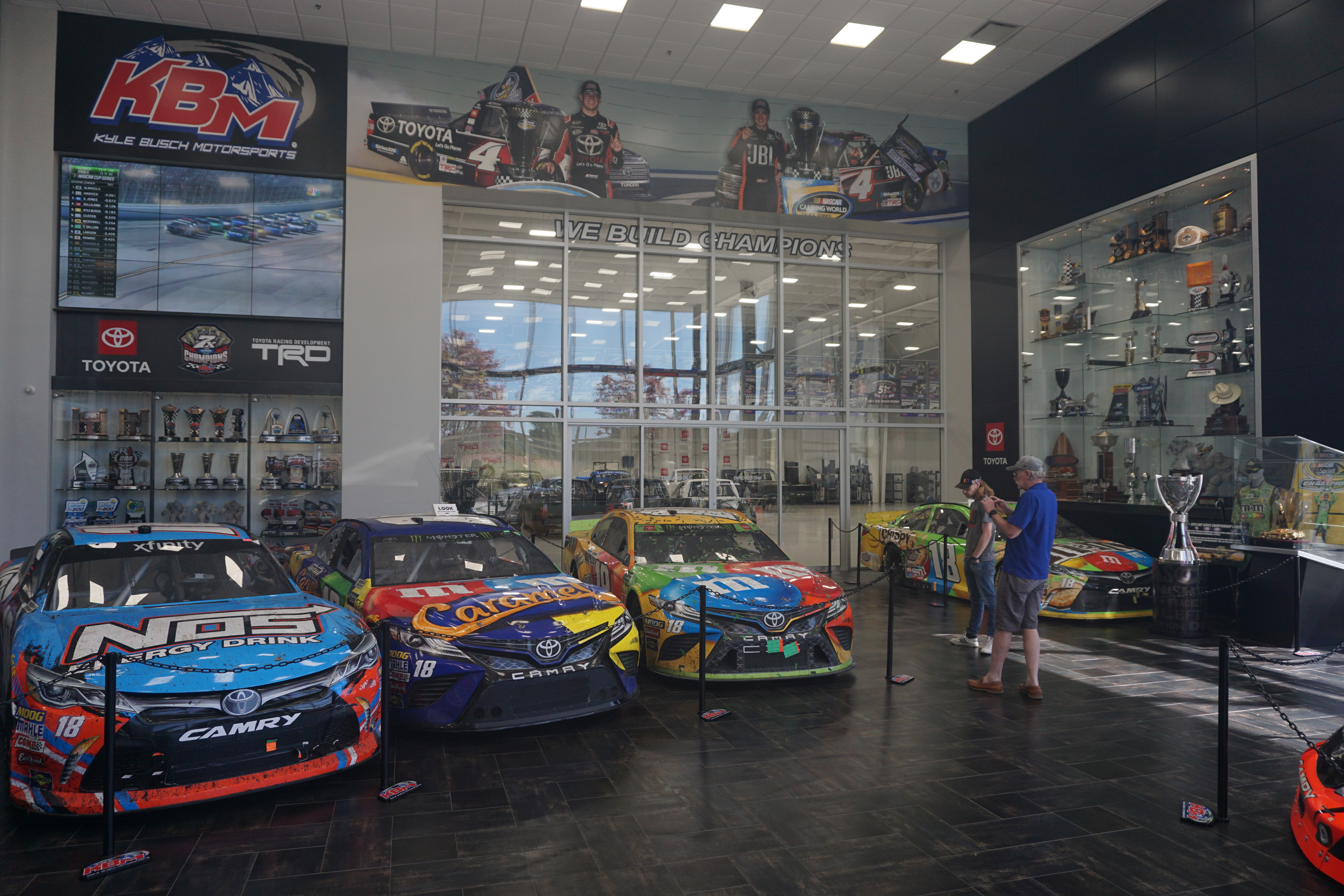
Kyle Busch Motorsports in Mooresville

KBM was founded after Busch purchased the remaining assets of Xpress Motorsports from J.B. Scott (father of driver Brian Scott) in late 2009 as well as purchasing trucks from Roush Fenway Racing, which had closed its Truck team the previous year. Rick Ren, the crew chief on Ron Hornaday Jr.'s 2009 championship team, would be signed as the team's competition director. Busch had competed in the Truck Series for the 2008 and 2009 seasons in the No. 51 for Billy Ballew Motorsports with Miccosukee Indian Gaming as his primary sponsor, and had split the ride with Brian Ickler the previous year.

Busch brought Ickler to the KBM stable, and signed Tayler Malsam away from Randy Moss Motorsports after he finished second in series Rookie of the Year standings to former Cup and Busch/Nationwide driver Johnny Sauter. The team ambitiously planned to run three trucks in its debut season: Busch and Ickler would split the primary truck (No. 18), Malsam was to drive a second truck for KBM, the No. 56 ActivWater/Talking Rain Tundra, and a third was to be fielded for 2008 series champion Johnny Benson if sponsorship could be found. The Miccosukee sponsorship was to carry over to Busch's primary truck as part of an agreement with Phoenix Racing. On February 7, however, the Miccosukee tribe's new leadership pulled out of NASCAR altogether, leaving Busch's team and Phoenix's Cup and Nationwide series teams without sponsorship. Benson would also be limited to a part-time schedule with KBM and Ballew, and Malsam's team ceased operations after only seven races.

After operating out of the former Xpress shop for most of its first season, the team opened its new $10 million facility in Mooresville, North Carolina on October 14, 2010.

In 2011, KBM made its first foray into the then-Nationwide Series (now NASCAR O'Reilly Auto Parts Series) in conjunction with NEMCO Motorsports. The team moved to full-time in 2012. On November 16, 2013, Busch announced that the team would not race in the Nationwide Series in 2014 due to lack of funding.

In December 2014, former competition director Rick Ren (released after 2013) filed a lawsuit against the team for breach of contract, claiming the team failed to pay him a contractual bonus and 10% commissions for two sponsorship deals Ren claimed to have procured for the team, totaling US$355,000. The sponsorships in question – Central Kentucky Angus Sales for driver Parker Kligerman and Sabala Whitetail for driver Brian Scott (owned by Scott's father J. B. Scott) – had prior associations with the drivers.

On January 25, 2021, Busch announced the team's late model program would be temporarily shut down in order to better manage his other obligations, though he did not rule out the possibility of a revival in the future.

After receiving engines from Triad Racing Technologies early in its history, KBM would ultimately receive engines and technical support from Joe Gibbs Racing through 2022.

After JGR and Toyota failed to secure a replacement for Busch's departing primary sponsor Mars, Incorporated after 2022, it was reported that Busch would depart from the team and manufacturer after 15 seasons. On September 13, 2022, Busch announced that he had signed with Richard Childress Racing to drive the No. 8 in the Cup Series in 2023, returning to Chevrolet for the first time since 2007. On November 4, 2022, KBM announced that Chase Purdy would pilot the No. 4 full-time in a multi-year deal beginning in 2023, the No. 51 would be shared by Busch, Jack Wood, and other TBA drivers, and a technical partnership with Rev Racing as they expanded into the Truck Series with 2022 ARCA Menards Series Champion Nick Sanchez piloting the No. 2 Chevrolet.

On September 27, 2023, it was announced that Spire Motorsports had purchased the assets of KBM, and that they would suspend their operations at the conclusion of the season, along with Busch's manufacturing company, Rowdy Manufacturing.

In February 2024, KBM sued Rev Racing for breach of contract. The lawsuit states that KBM was owed US$325,000 for bringing Nick Sanchez into the Truck Series. Three months later, KBM dropped the lawsuit, indicating that both parties have reached a settlement.

After selling assets and suspending operations in the Craftsman Truck Series, KBM downsized and continued operating as a small dirt team mainly fielding different types of dirt cars for both Kyle Busch and his son, Brexton Busch. The pair race on local dirt tracks across the country with sponsorship from Lucas Oil and Servpro.

On May 21, 2026, Kyle Busch passed away from illness. It is unknown who the team's ownership will be.

== Nationwide Series ==
In May 2011, Kimi Räikkönen made his Nationwide Series (now Xfinity Series) debut at Charlotte Motor Speedway in the No. 87 Perky Jerky Toyota Camry. The car was fielded in an alliance between KBM and NEMCO Motorsports, guaranteeing Räikkönen a spot in the field. Räikkönen started 22nd and finished 27th, four laps down.

=== Car No. 54 history ===
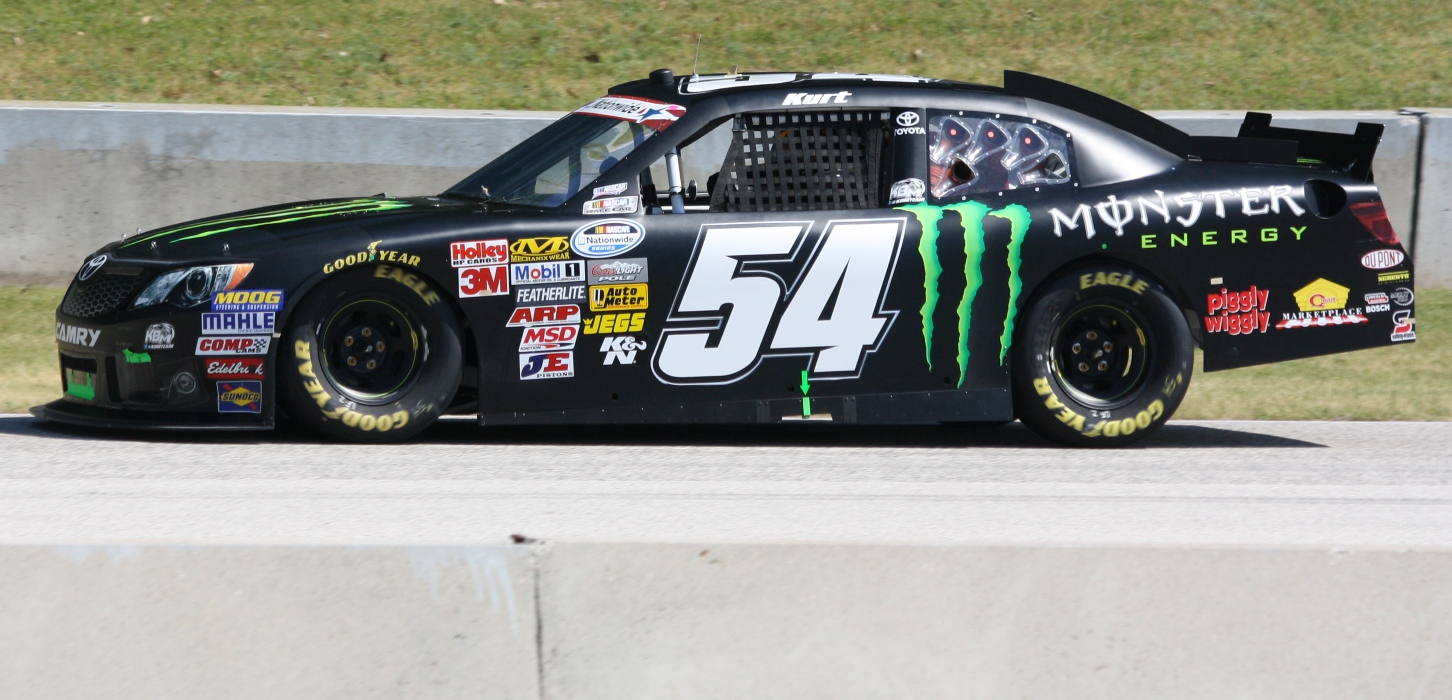
Kurt Busch in the No. 54 in 2012.

Kyle Busch & Kurt Busch (2012)

For 2012, KBM added a full-time Nationwide team, the No. 54 Toyota Camry. The car was split by both Kyle Busch and older brother Kurt, both with sponsorship from Monster Energy. Kyle ran 22 races while Kurt ran 11. The team struggled in its initial year, winning only one race with Kurt at Richmond. This was the first time in his Nationwide Series career that Kyle Busch did not score a victory over the course of a season, leading him to return to Joe Gibbs Racing's Nationwide program for 2013, bringing the No. 54 Toyota Camry and Monster Energy with him.

==== Car No. 54 results ====
NASCAR Nationwide Series results
Year	Driver	No.	Make	1	2	3	4	5	6	7	8	9	10	11	12	13	14	15	16	17	18	19	20	21	22	23	24	25	26	27	28	29	30	31	32	33	Owners	Pts
2012	Kyle Busch	54	Toyota	DAY; 18	PHO; 11	LVS; 33	BRI; 17	CAL; 8			TAL; 2*			CLT; 3					DAY; 23	NHA; 28	CHI; 27	IRP; 22*		GLN; 6	CGV; 10	BRI; 3	ATL; 7		CHI; 2		DOV; 5	CLT; 4	KAN; 6	TEX; 3	PHO; 4	HOM; 2*	8th	1122
2012	Kurt Busch	54	Toyota						TEX; 30	RCH; 1		DAR; 8	IOW; 5		DOV; 4	MCH; 3	ROA; 8	KEN; 2					IOW; 17					RCH; 3		KEN; 28							8th	1122

=== Car No. 77 history ===
Parker Kligerman (2013)

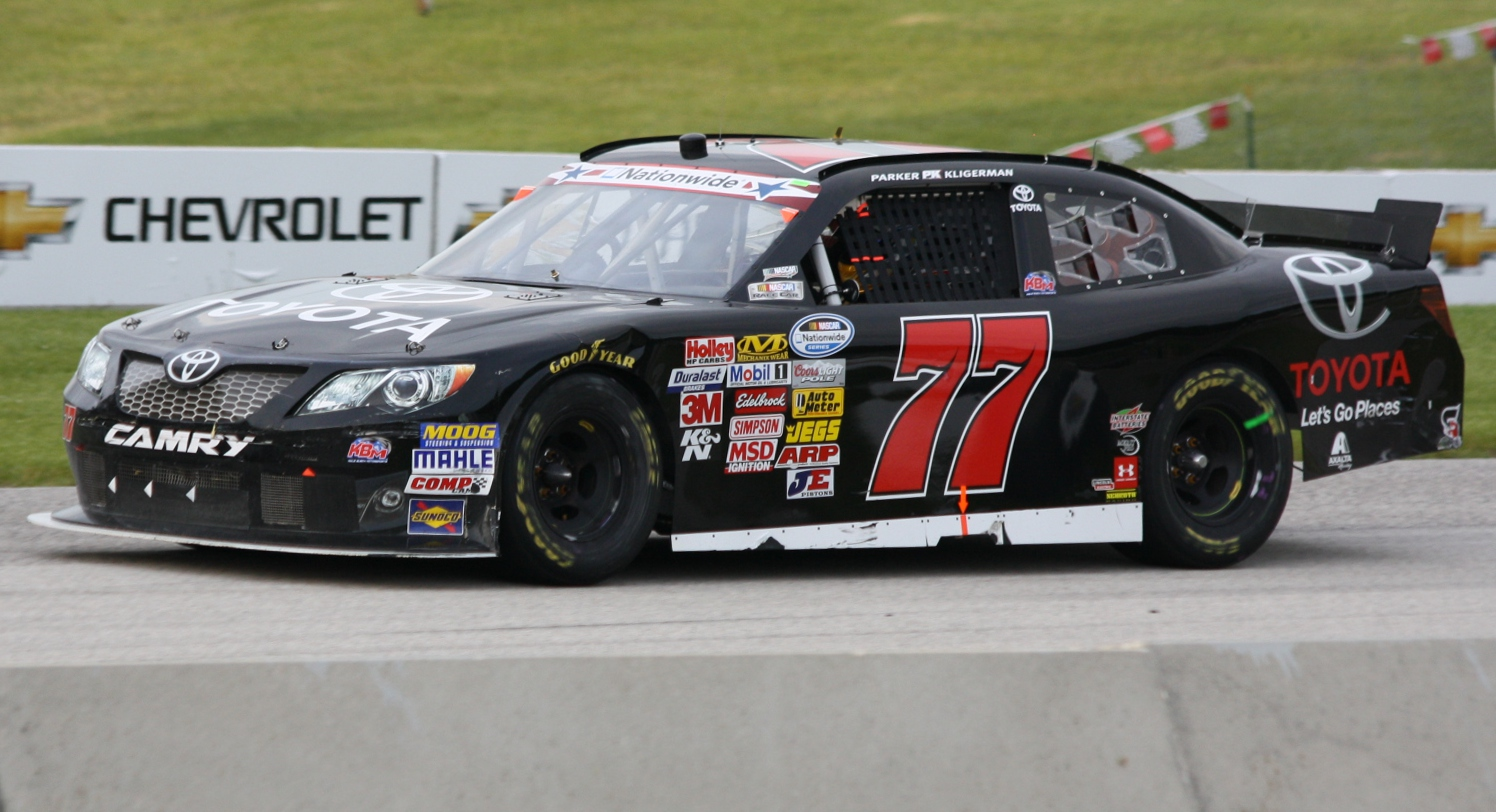
Parker Kligerman in 2013

For 2013, 22-year-old Parker Kligerman, a former development driver for Team Penske, was signed to run his first full Nationwide Series schedule in the No. 77 Toyota Camry, with sponsorship from Toyota and Bandit Chippers. Despite finishing 9th in the standings, owner Busch announced after the Ford EcoBoost 300 that he would be shutting down the Nationwide team due to a lack of funding.

==== Car No. 77 results ====
NASCAR Nationwide Series results
Year	Driver	No.	Make	1	2	3	4	5	6	7	8	9	10	11	12	13	14	15	16	17	18	19	20	21	22	23	24	25	26	27	28	29	30	31	32	33	Owners	Pts
2013	Parker Kligerman	77	Toyota	DAY; 5	PHO; 19	LVS; 30	BRI; 9	CAL; 4	TEX; 12	RCH; 11	TAL; 6	DAR; 15	CLT; 9	DOV; 11	IOW; 14	MCH; 25	ROA; 3	KEN; 16	DAY; 18	NHA; 20	CHI; 6	IND; 18	IOW; 16	GLN; 6	MOH; 13	BRI; 35	ATL; 16	RCH; 36	CHI; 8	KEN; 29	DOV; 7	KAN; 7	CLT; 9	TEX; 13	PHO; 12	HOM; 7	13th	993

== Craftsman Truck Series ==
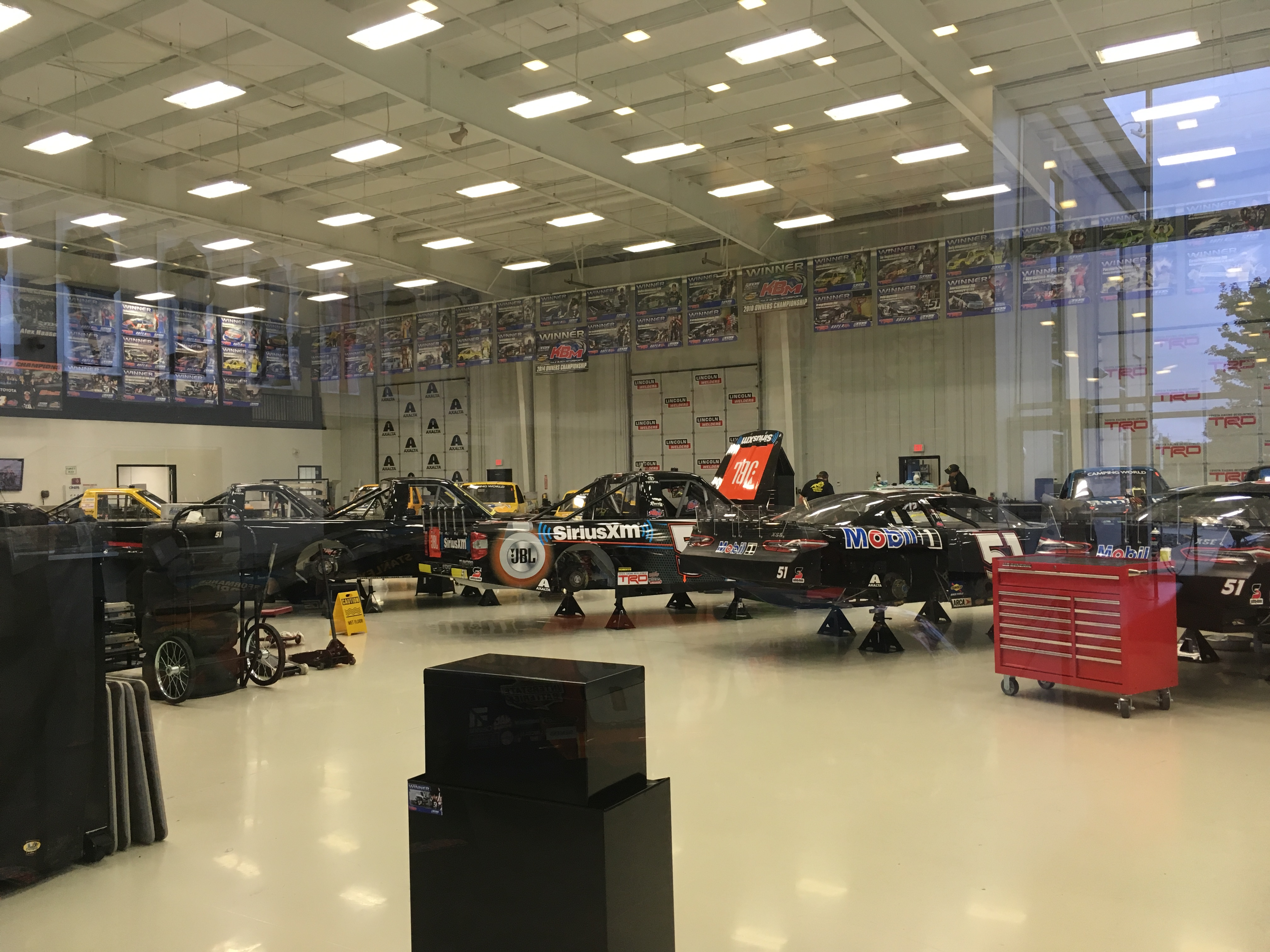
The Kyle Busch Motorsports race shop floor

=== Truck No. 4 history ===
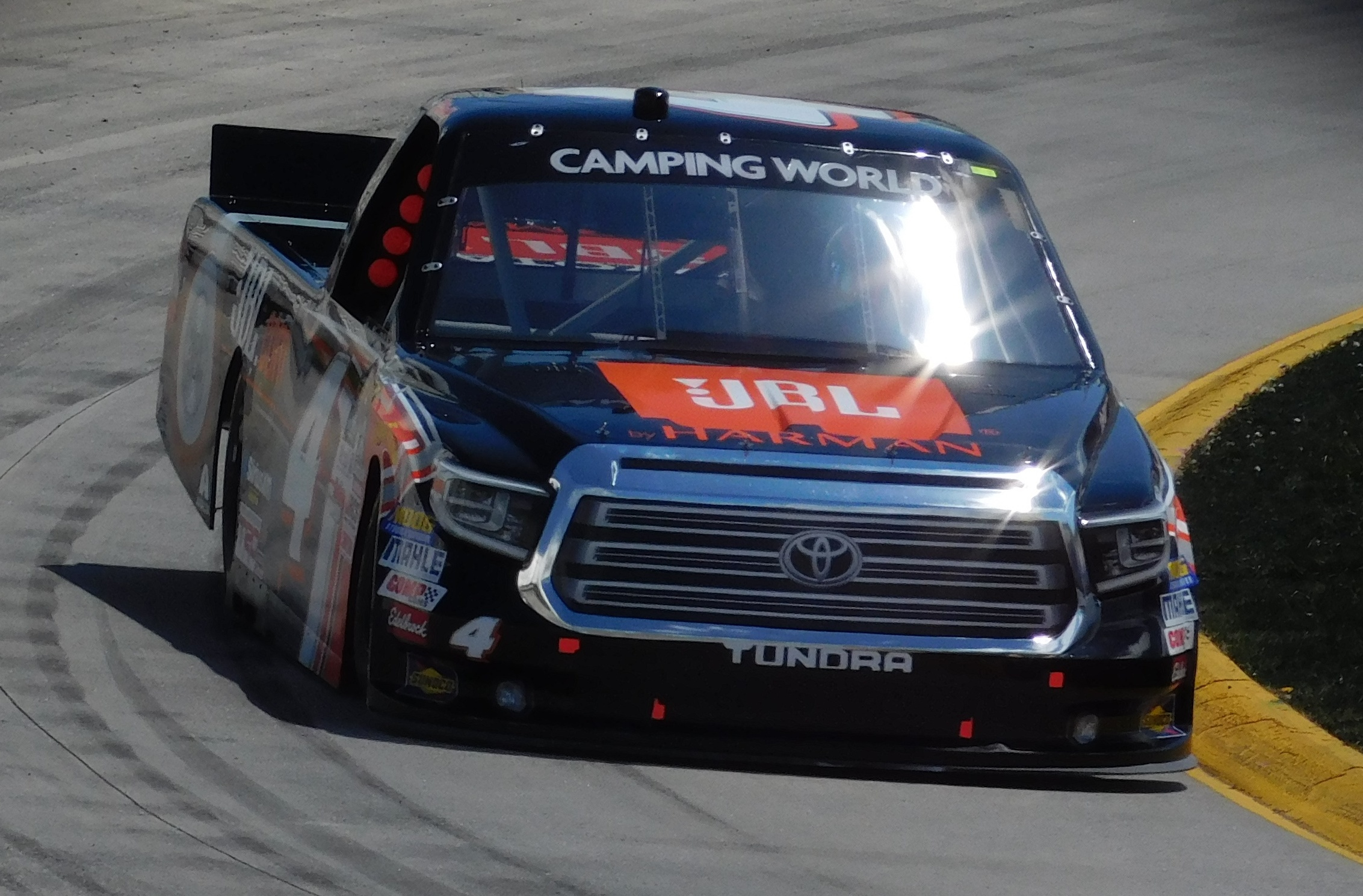
Christopher Bell in the No. 4 at Martinsville Speedway in 2017

Erik Jones (2015)

The No. 4 Truck Began in 2015. Erik Jones began running a third KBM truck full-time after running the No. 51 part-time in 2013 and 2014. In December 2014, it was announced that the truck would be number 4. Jones would have his best season with collecting 3 wins, 11 top-five and 20 top-ten finishes to win the championship title. Jones also collected rookie of the year honors. This would be the first driver's championship at KBM and the third consecutive owner's title.

Christopher Bell (2016–2017)

Christopher Bell moved into the truck full-time for 2016. Bell was involved in a violent crash near the end of the season opener at Daytona. His truck gripped the track, causing the truck to go on two wheels before it launched into the air and barrel-rolled multiple times. He was credited with a 16th-place finish. He would finish the season with one win at Gateway and a 3rd-place points finish. Bell returned to the truck in 2017 and won the NCWTS Championship at Homestead–Miami Speedway.

Todd Gilliland (2018–2019)

For 2018, KBM announced that Todd Gilliland would compete for Rookie of the Year honors driving the No. 4 truck for 19 races. Gilliland missed the first four of the season due to age restrictions; his father David Gilliland would drive at the season opener at Daytona and owner Kyle Busch would drive at Atlanta and Kansas. Spencer Davis raced at Las Vegas. Gilliland ran the full 2019 Truck season and won at Martinsville, but was replaced by Raphaël Lessard in 2020.

Raphaël Lessard (2020)

In 2020, Raphaël Lessard was tabbed to drive the 4 full time. Although he won at Talladega, his results did not allow him to keep his ride and was released from the team following the 2020 season.

John Hunter Nemechek (2021–2022)

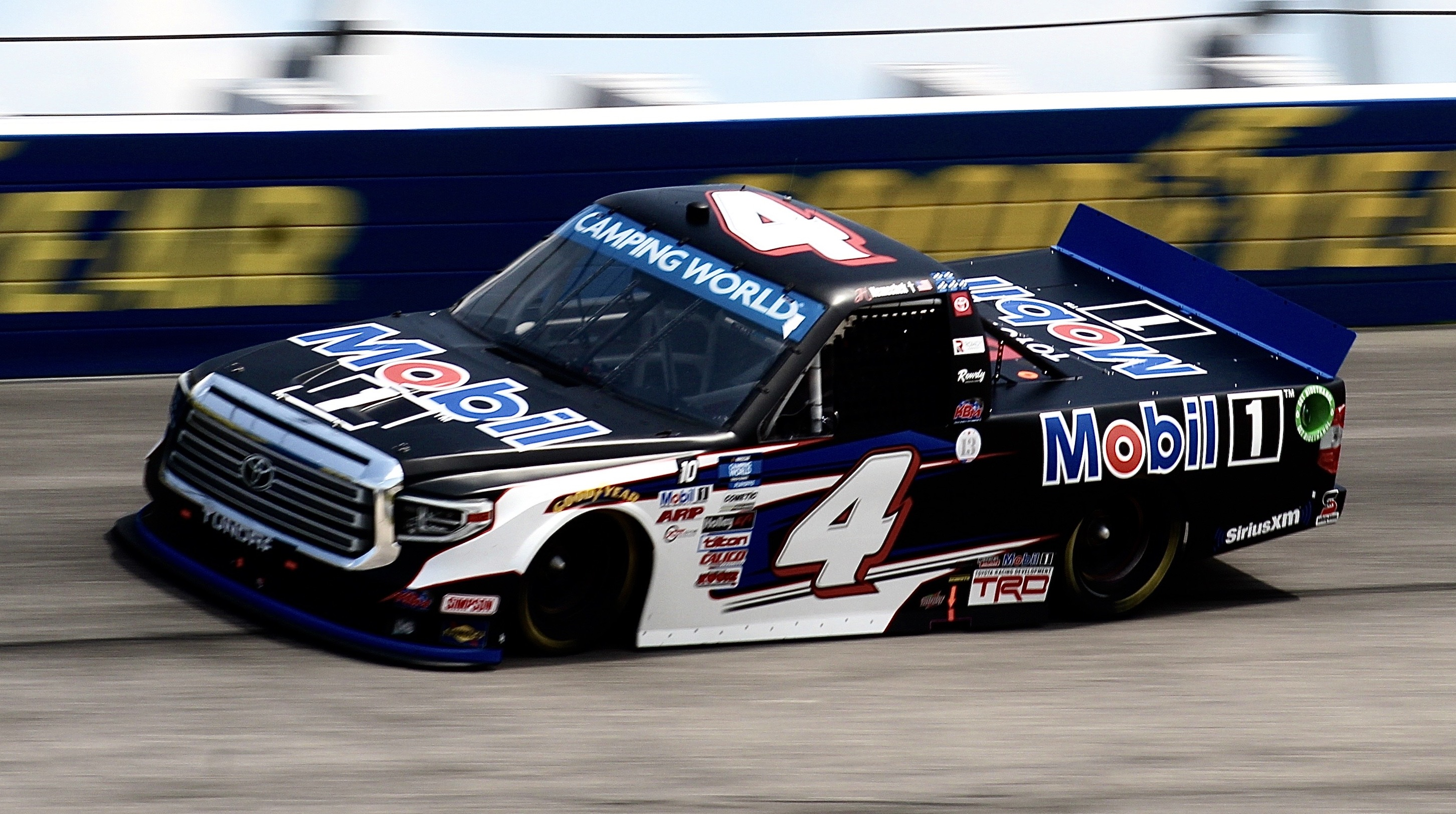
John Hunter Nemechek in the No. 4 at Darlington Raceway in 2021

In 2021, Lessard was released and replaced with John Hunter Nemechek, who drove the No. 38 Front Row Motorsports Ford in his rookie season in the Cup Series in 2020 but decided to leave FRM to return to the Truck Series full-time, which he previously did in 2016 and 2017 in the No. 8 truck for his family team, NEMCO Motorsports, and won four races in those two years. Lessard ended up going to GMS Racing, where he would sign to drive at least 12 races for the team with hopes of a full season, depending on sponsorship. Nemechek won 5 races in 2021 and finished 4th in points. He then signed a contract extension through 2022. Nemechek would not return to the team in 2023 due to Kyle Busch Motorsports switching from Toyota to Chevrolet, as Nemechek had a contract with Toyota and not the team.

Chase Purdy (2023)

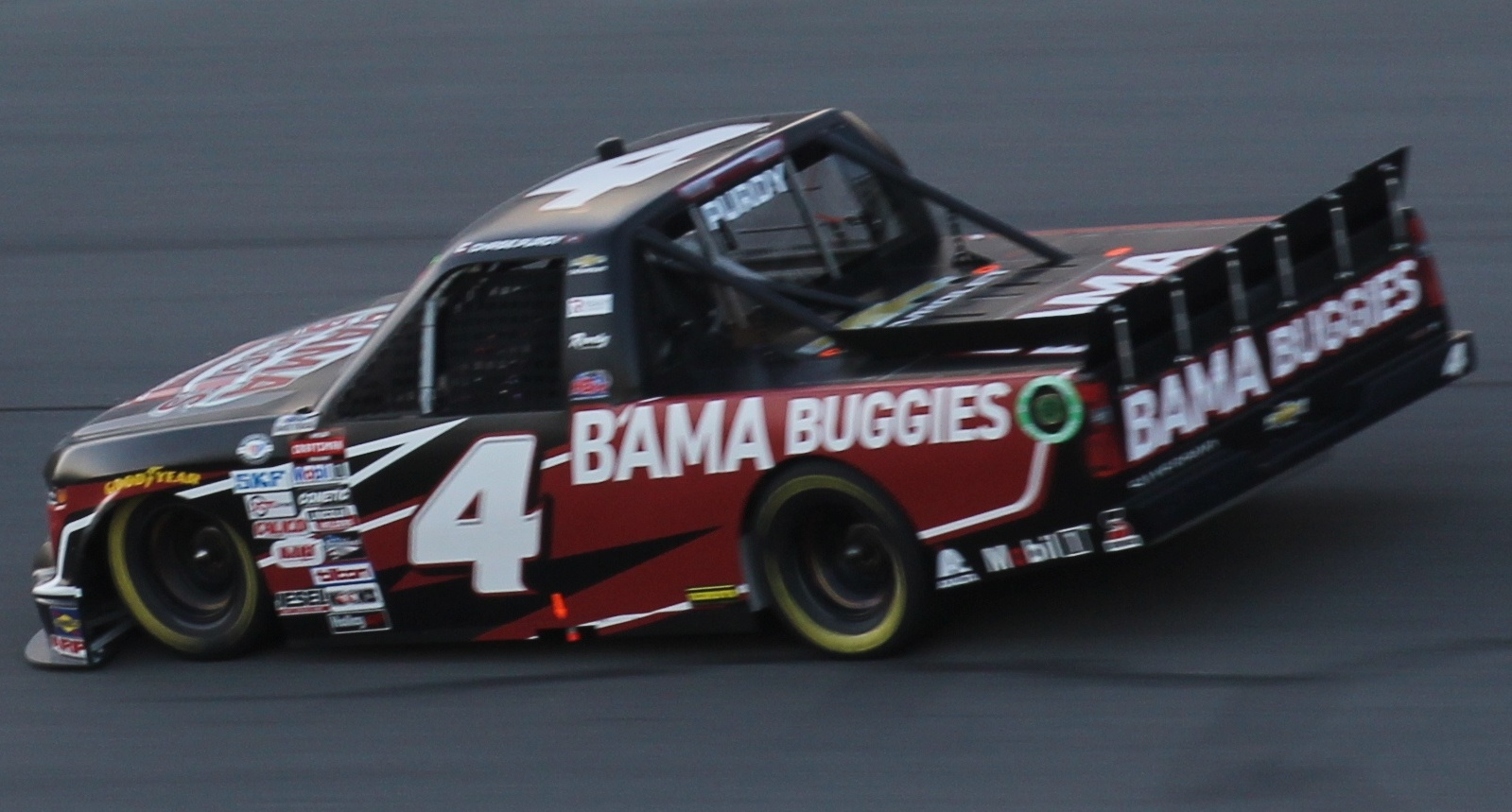
Chase Purdy in the No. 4 at Daytona International Speedway in 2023

Chase Purdy would pilot the No. 4 full time in KBM's first season with Chevrolet. On April 6, the No. 4 was docked 10 driver and owner points for illegal modifications of the engine oil reservoir tank prior to the Texas race.

==== Truck No. 4 results ====
Year	Driver	No.	Make	1	2	3	4	5	6	7	8	9	10	11	12	13	14	15	16	17	18	19	20	21	22	23	NCWTC	Pts
2015	Erik Jones	4	Toyota	DAY; 2	ATL; 7	MAR; 3	KAN; 11*	CLT; 2*	DOV; 3	TEX; 15	GTW; 23*	IOW; 1*	KEN; 2*	ELD; 4	POC; 10	MCH; 3	BRI; 6	MSP; 1	CHI; 6	NHA; 7	LVS; 9	TAL; 4	MAR; 10	TEX; 1*	PHO; 9*	HOM; 6	1st	899
2016	Christopher Bell	4	Toyota	DAY; 16	ATL; 26	MAR; 19	KAN; 4	DOV; 3	CLT; 8	TEX; 32	IOW; 9	GTW; 1	KEN; 4	ELD; 2	POC; 10	BRI; 7*	MCH; 24	MSP; 5	CHI; 4	NHA; 2	LVS; 6	TAL; 6	MAR; 4	TEX; 11	PHO; 7	HOM; 8	4th	4025
2017	Christopher Bell	4	Toyota	DAY; 8	ATL; 1*	MAR; 3*	KAN; 4	CLT; 3	DOV; 25	TEX; 1*	GTW; 6	IOW; 5*	KEN; 1*	ELD; 9	POC; 1	MCH; 2	BRI; 7	MSP; 26	CHI; 3	NHA; 1*	LVS; 2*	TAL; 2	MAR; 8	TEX; 3	PHO; 8*	HOM; 2	1st	4035
2018	David Gilliland	4	Toyota	DAY; 21																							11th	744
2018	Kyle Busch	4	Toyota		ATL; 21*				KAN; 2																		11th	744
2018	Spencer Davis	4	Toyota			LVS; 13																					11th	744
2018	Todd Gilliland	4	Toyota				MAR; 14	DOV; 10		CLT; 10	TEX; 6*	IOW; 29	GTW; 2	CHI; 16	KEN; 7	ELD; 22	POC; 7	MCH; 5	BRI; 5	MSP; 11	LVS; 27	TAL; 20	MAR; 12	TEX; 4*	PHO; 17	HOM; 13	11th	744
2019	Todd Gilliland	4	Toyota	DAY; 19	ATL; 9	LVS; 7	MAR; 15	TEX; 14	DOV; 15	KAN; 3	CLT; 7	TEX; 27	IOW; 10	GTW; 2	CHI; 6	KEN; 17	POC; 7	ELD; 5	MCH; 24	BRI; 9	MSP; 18	LVS; 5	TAL; 2	MAR; 1	PHO; 14	HOM; 8	12th	723
2020	Raphaël Lessard	4	Toyota	DAY; 20	LVS; 30	CLT; 15	ATL; 18	HOM; 11	POC; 37	KEN; 13	TEX; 12	KAN; 16	KAN; 11	MCH; 7	DAY; 3	DOV; 19	GTW; 6	DAR; 6	RCH; 26	BRI; 18	LVS; 20	TAL; 1	KAN; 33	TEX; 4	MAR; 20	PHO; 5	13th	563
2021	John Hunter Nemechek	4	Toyota	DAY; 7	DAY; 3	LVS; 1*	ATL; 3	BRI; 39	RCH; 1*	KAN; 5	DAR; 8*	COA; 12	CLT; 1*	TEX; 1*	NSH; 10	POC; 1	KNX; 11	GLN; 2	GTW; 22	DAR; 2	BRI; 3	LVS; 33	TAL; 4	MAR; 39	PHO; 7		3rd	4030
2022	John Hunter Nemechek	4	Toyota	DAY; 24*	LVS; 25	ATL; 24	COA; 2	MAR; 4	BRI; 3	DAR; 1*	KAN; 6	TEX; 6	CLT; 3	GTW; 35	SON; 8	KNX; 2	NSH; 9	MOH; 28	POC; 3	IRP; 10*	RCH; 2	KAN; 1	BRI; 12	TAL; 24	HOM; 35	PHO; 4	5th	2285
2023	Chase Purdy	4	Chevy	DAY; 17	LVS; 8	ATL; 7	COA; 27	TEX; 2	BRD; 28	MAR; 10	KAN; 33	DAR; 32	NWS; 8	CLT; 16	GTW; 5	NSH; 6	MOH; 13	POC; 18	RCH; 22	IRP; 14	MLW; 6	KAN; 14	BRI; 8	TAL; 28	HOM; 10	PHO; 3	11th	582

=== Truck No. 9 history ===
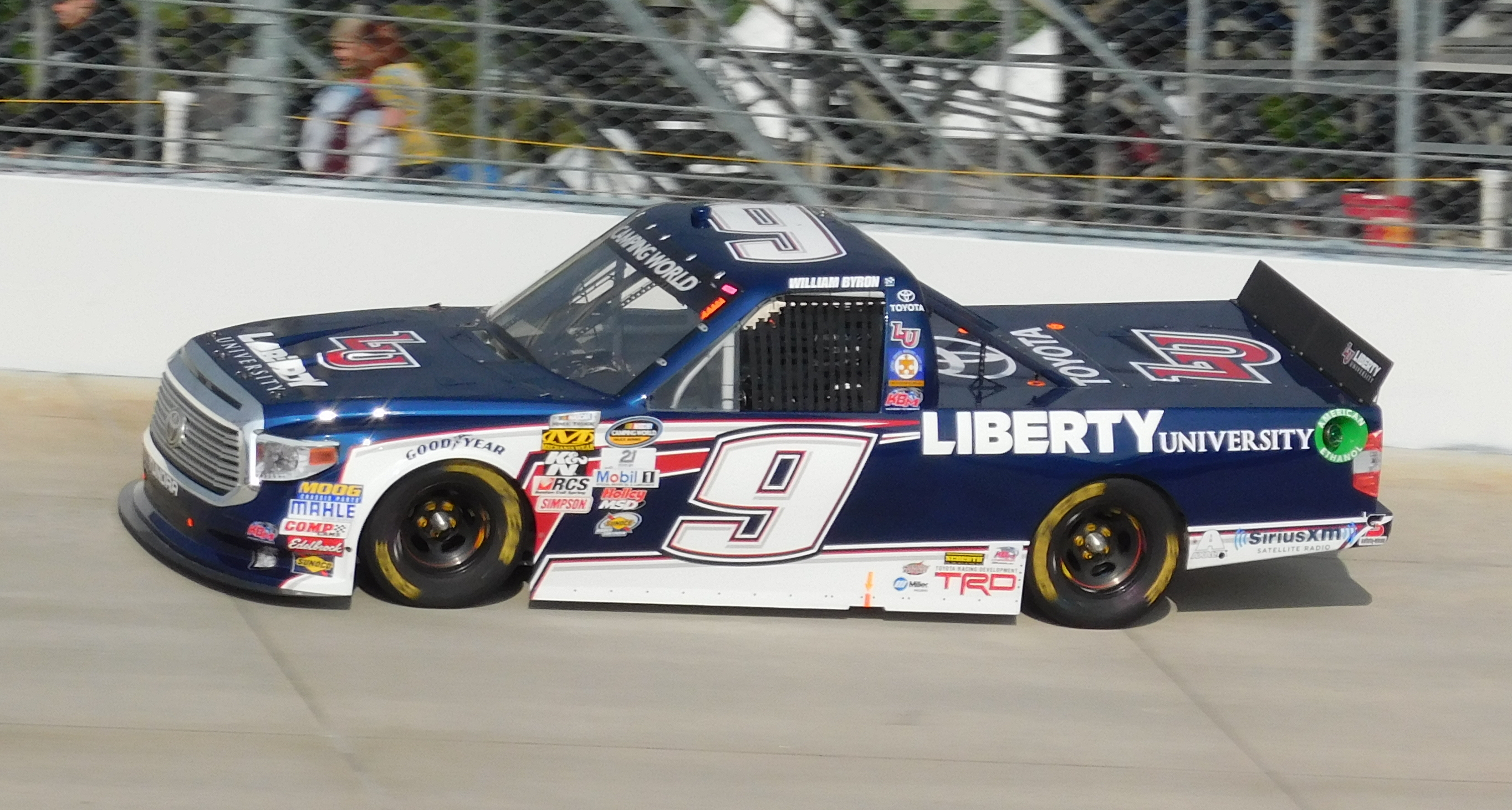
William Byron in the No. 9 at Dover International Speedway in 2016

William Byron (2015–2016)

In the middle of the 2015 NASCAR Camping World Truck Series season, team owner Kyle Busch announced that Christopher Bell would drive a fourth KBM truck, numbered 52, in the UNOH 225 at Kentucky Speedway. The crew chief was announced as Wes Ward. After the release of Justin Boston, however, Bell moved to the No. 54 truck at Kentucky and the No. 52 did not run.

At Phoenix in November, William Byron made his debut in a fourth KBM truck numbered 9, with sponsorship from Liberty University. Byron finished 31st after being involved in an early wreck with Brandon Jones and Cole Custer.

Byron drove the No. 9 truck full-time in 2016. In his thirteenth career start, at Pocono, Byron scored his fifth win of the season, breaking Kurt Busch's old record for wins by a rookie Truck Series driver, with nearly half the season left to go. Byron would continue to win collecting a 6th win at New Hampshire in the first race of the chase for the championship. The team suffered an engine failure with ten laps to go at the last race of the Round of 6 at Phoenix after Byron led a majority of the race, costing him his shot at the Driver's Championship. However, Byron won the season finale at Homestead and Kyle Busch Motorsports collected the Owner's Championship for Truck No. 9 in 2016. This was Kyle Busch Motorsports' fourth-consecutive and fifth all-time NASCAR Camping World Truck Series Owner's Championship.

==== Truck No. 9 results ====
Year	Driver	No.	Make	1	2	3	4	5	6	7	8	9	10	11	12	13	14	15	16	17	18	19	20	21	22	23	Owner	Pts
2015	William Byron	9	Toyota	DAY	ATL	MAR	KAN	CLT	DOV	TEX	GTW	IOW	KEN	ELD	POC	MCH	BRI	MSP	CHI	NHA	LVS	TAL	MAR	TEX	PHO; 31	HOM	59th	13
2016	William Byron	9	Toyota	DAY; 13	ATL; 32	MAR; 3	KAN; 1	DOV; 11*	CLT; 10	TEX; 1	IOW; 1*	GTW; 17*	KEN; 1*	ELD; 14	POC; 1*	BRI; 4	MCH; 4	MSP; 10	CHI; 30	NHA; 1*	LVS; 5	TAL; 10	MAR; 8	TEX; 6	PHO; 27*	HOM; 1	1st	4032

=== Truck No. 15 history ===
Part Time (2011)

In April 2011, KBM signed 2007 Formula One World Champion Kimi Räikkönen to run a limited schedule in the Camping World Truck Series. Räikkönen and Busch planned three to five races beginning at Charlotte Motor Speedway in May. The efforts were sponsored by Perky Jerky, and the team used the owners points of Billy Ballew Motorsports' 15 team. In his debut, Räikkönen started 31st but finished a solid 15th. The deal ended due to lack of sponsorship beyond the Charlotte race. Dirt late model driver Josh Richards signed to run 11 races with KBM and sponsor Joy Mining Machinery, making his debut in the No. 15 at Kentucky Speedway. Richards finished 29th in his debut, then 21st at Atlanta.

==== Truck No. 15 results ====
Year	Driver	No.	Make	1	2	3	4	5	6	7	8	9	10	11	12	13	14	15	16	17	18	19	20	21	22	23	24	25	Owner	Pts
2011	Kimi Räikkönen	15	Toyota	DAY	PHO	DAR	MAR	NSH	DOV	CLT; 15	KAN	TEX																	35th	155
2011	Josh Richards	15	Toyota										KEN; 29	IOW	NSH	IRP	POC	MCH	BRI	ATL; 21	CHI	NHA	KEN	LVS	TAL	MAR	TEX	HOM	35th	155

=== Truck No. 18 history ===
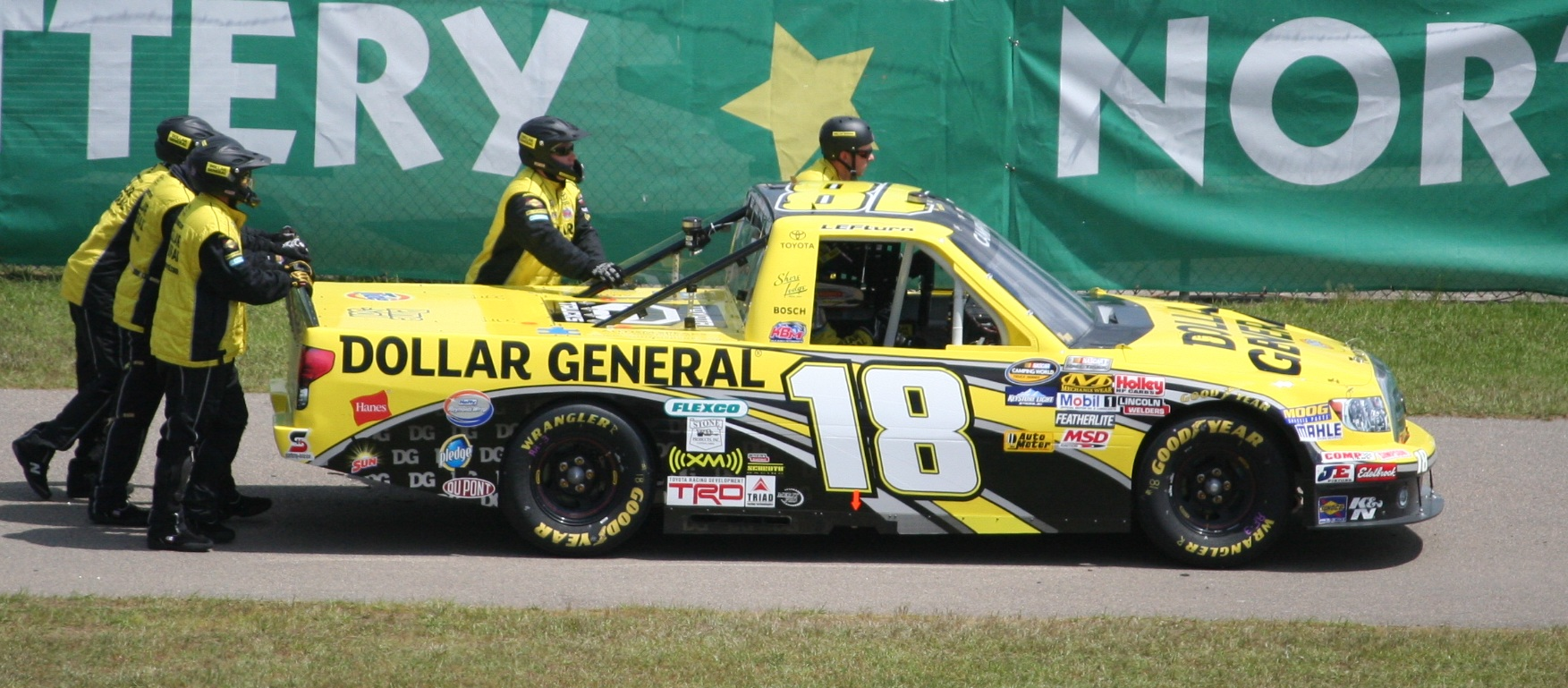
Jason Leffler in 2012.

Multiple drivers (2010–2012)

The No. 18 truck (Kyle Busch's Sprint Cup Series number), the primary entry of KBM during their debut 2010 season, with Kyle Busch running a partial schedule and Brian Ickler running non-companion races. The team would lose its Miccosukee sponsorship prior to the season, replaced by Toyota, M&M's, Interstate Batteries, Dollar General, and Traxxas. In the first seven races of the season, Busch made five starts and won twice, while Ickler finished in the top ten both of his starts. KBM lost Ickler in May when he was signed by Roush Fenway Racing to drive its No. 6 and No. 16 Nationwide Series cars on a part-time basis as part of an extended tryout with the organization. Busch announced shortly thereafter that he would split the driving duties of the No. 18 with Johnny Benson for the remainder of the year. Kyle Busch won 8 races in 16 starts, and the No. 18 truck won the owners championship in its first full-time season.

Both Ickler and Busch returned for 2011, with Kyle running 16 races and Ickler running 4. Kasey Kahne drove a single race for the No. 18 with sponsorship from Automotive Service Excellence, winning at Darlington. Josh Richards drove two races with Joy Mining Equipment. Kyle Busch scored 6 wins over the course of the season and the 18 truck finished second in the owners championship to the Kevin Harvick Incorporated No. 2 truck.

For 2012, veteran Jason Leffler was signed to be the primary driver of the No. 18 Toyota Tundra. The team secured sponsorship from Dollar General for 14 races. After nine starts and with a lone top-five finish to his credit, Leffler was released. Finishing the season in the truck were Joe Gibbs Racing drivers Brian Scott (five races), Denny Hamlin, Drew Herring, and Kyle Busch (3 races), along with Kurt Busch. Kyle Busch had previously abstained from driving in the Truck Series per a request from JGR co-owner J.D. Gibbs, following an incident the previous season. Hamlin and Scott scored the team's only wins of the season at Martinsville and Phoenix. Kyle Busch didn't win a race for the first time in his Camping World Truck Series career.

Joey Coulter (2013)

For 2013, Busch hired former Richard Childress Racing driver Joey Coulter to drive the No. 18. Coulter and Busch had a previous on-track altercation in 2011, leading to a physical encounter between Busch and team owner Richard Childress. Coulter struggled, with only five top tens and a 15th-place points finish. With Coulter moving to GMS Racing, the No. 18 team did not run in 2014 and 2015.

Multiple drivers (2016)

In late 2015, KBM announced that Cody Coughlin would pilot the No. 18 JEGS.com Toyota Tundra part-time for the 2016. Coughlin ran the 18 in the season-opening event at Daytona International Speedway. Harrison Burton made his Truck Series debut in the No. 18 at Martinsville Speedway. Kyle Busch returned to the No. 18 Truck for 4 races at Martinsville, Charlotte, Kentucky and Chicagoland. Busch won the races at Martinsville and Chicagoland. Noah Gragson ran the final 2 races of the year in the Phoenix and Homestead with sponsorship from SPEEDVEGAS. For the final 2 races of the season, the trucks were prepped by Wauters Motorsports.

Noah Gragson (2017–2018)

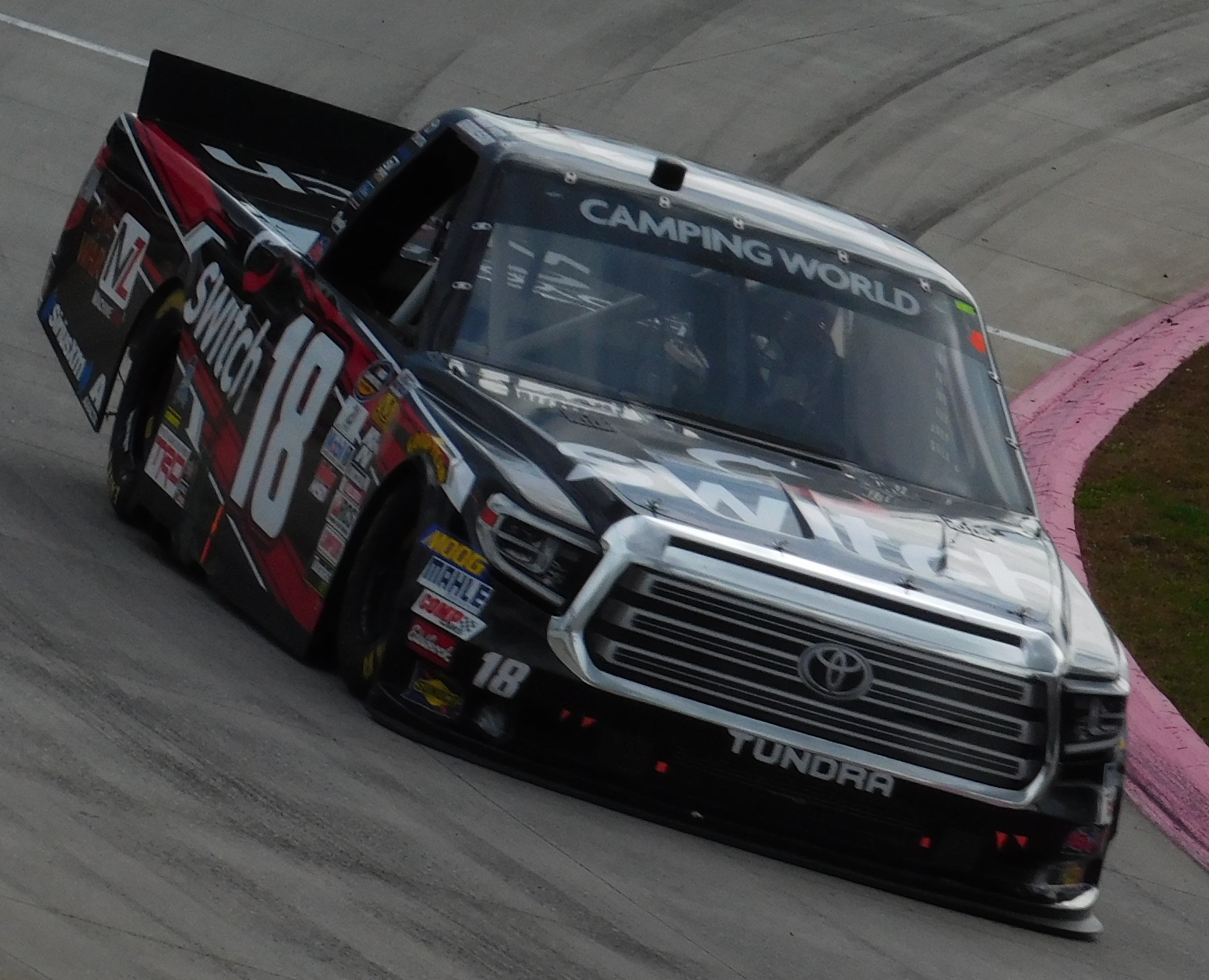
Noah Gragson in the No. 18 at Martinsville Speedway in 2017

It was announced in October 2016 that Noah Gragson was signed to drive the No. 18 full-time in 2017, and that he would compete for Rookie of the Year honors. Gragson missed the playoffs but scored his first win at the fall Martinsville race. Gragson finished 10th in points, second highest of the non playoff drivers.

Harrison Burton (2019)

In 2019, Harrison Burton piloted the truck full-time, replacing Gragson who moved to the Xfinity Series and JR Motorsports. Burton did not win a race and finished 12th in points.

Christian Eckes (2020)

When Burton was promoted to Xfinity racing in 2020, Christian Eckes took over the No. 18. Eckes also went winless, finishing 8th in points.

Chandler Smith (2021–2022)

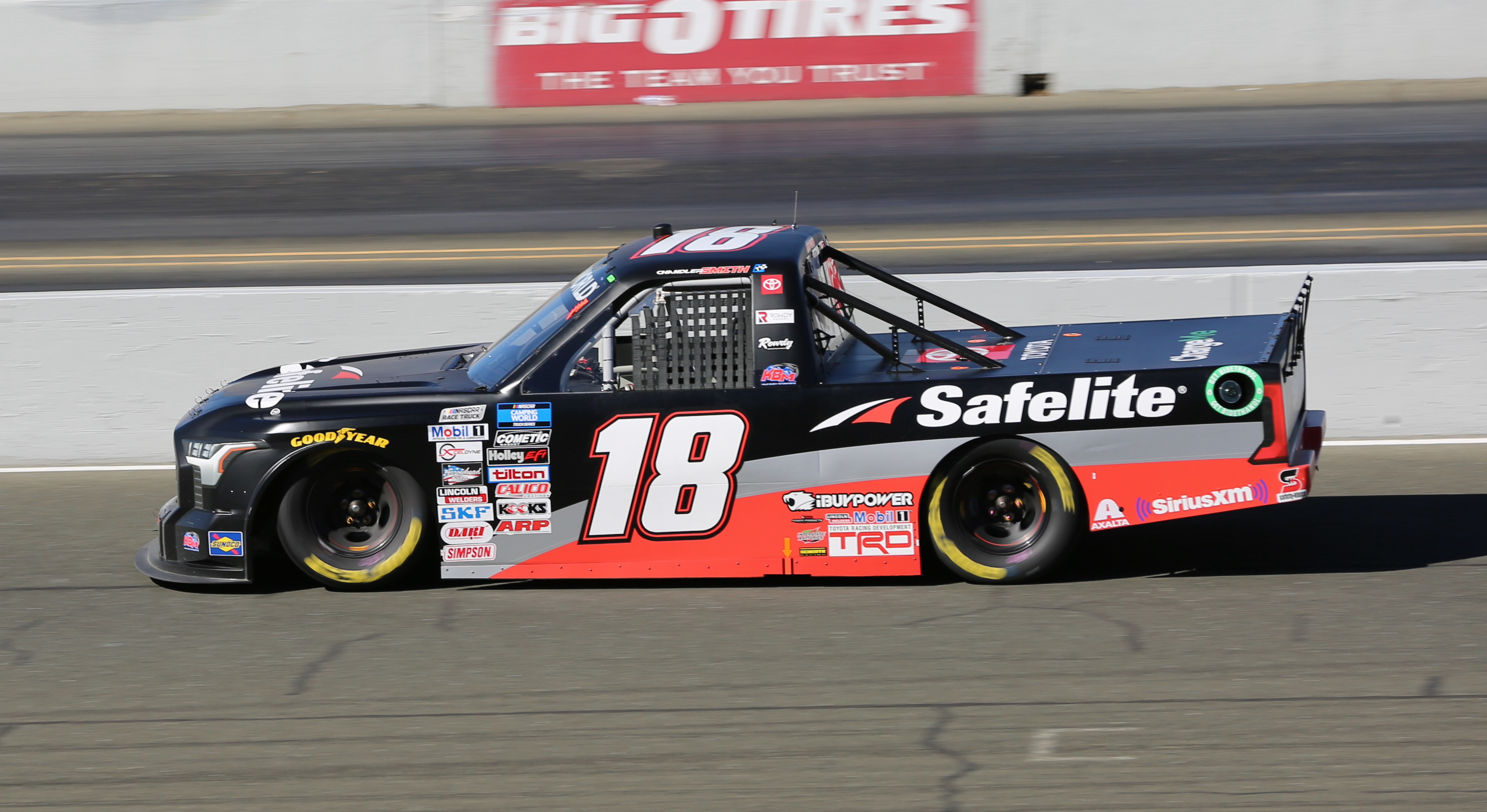
Chandler Smith in the No. 18 at Sonoma Raceway in 2022

In 2021, Eckes was released and replaced with Chandler Smith, who drove the Nos. 46 and 51 part-time for the previous two seasons, and competed for Venturini Motorsports in the ARCA Menards Series, where he racked up nine wins in three part-time seasons. Smith won two races in 2021, but inconsistency led him to an eighth-place points finish.

Smith began the 2022 season with a 21st-place finish at Daytona. He scored wins at Las Vegas and Pocono to make the playoffs. During the playoffs, he won at Richmond and stayed consistent enough to make the Championship 4. Smith finished third at Phoenix and third in the standings.

Smith, like his teammates, will not return to KBM in 2023, as he will drive full time for Kaulig Racing in the NASCAR Xfinity Series in the No. 16 Chevrolet, replacing A. J. Allmendinger.

==== Truck No. 18 results ====
Year	Driver	No.	Make	1	2	3	4	5	6	7	8	9	10	11	12	13	14	15	16	17	18	19	20	21	22	23	24	25	Owner	Pts
2010	Kyle Busch	18	Toyota	DAY; 22	ATL; 2		NSH; 1*		DOV; 16*	CLT; 1*		MCH; 3			IRP; 2				BRI; 1*	CHI; 1*	KEN; 7*	NHA; 1*		MAR; 2	TAL; 1	TEX; 1*	PHO; 2	HOM; 1*	1st	4087
2010	Brian Ickler	18	Toyota			MAR; 3		KAN; 4					IOW; 13	GTY; 9			NSH; 8	DAR; 21					LVS; 7						1st	4087
2010	Johnny Benson	18	Toyota								TEX; 10																		1st	4087
2010	Kasey Kahne	18	Toyota													POC; 2													1st	4087
2011	Kyle Busch	18	Toyota	DAY; 5	PHO; 1*		MAR; 2	NSH; 1*	DOV; 1*	CLT; 1	KAN; 6		KEN; 1*				POC; 2	MCH; 25	BRI; 30	ATL; 3	CHI; 5	NHA; 1*			TAL; 9		TEX; 33		2nd	920
2011	Kasey Kahne	18	Toyota			DAR; 1*																							2nd	920
2011	Brian Ickler	18	Toyota									TEX; 4		IOW; 14									KEN; 5	LVS; 28					2nd	920
2011	Josh Richards	18	Toyota												NSH; 22	IRP; 22													2nd	920
2011	Denny Hamlin	18	Toyota																							MAR; 1*		HOM; 2	2nd	920
2012	Jason Leffler	18	Toyota	DAY; 36	MAR; 8	CAR; 34	KAN; 18	CLT; 4		TEX; 6	KEN; 8	IOW; 6	CHI; 8																5th	764
2012	Brian Scott	18	Toyota						DOV; 13							BRI; 17			KEN; 5			MAR; 10		PHO; 1*					5th	764
2012	Denny Hamlin	18	Toyota											POC; 5															5th	764
2012	Kurt Busch	18	Toyota												MCH; 9						TAL; 7								5th	764
2012	Kyle Busch	18	Toyota														ATL; 2*						TEX; 4		HOM; 2				5th	764
2012	Drew Herring	18	Toyota															IOW; 7											5th	764
2012	David Mayhew	18	Toyota																	LVS; 9									5th	764
2013	Joey Coulter	18	Toyota	DAY; 22	MAR; 15	CAR; 13	KAN; 2	CLT; 32	DOV; 8	TEX; 25	KEN; 16	IOW; 9	ELD; 4	POC; 4	MCH; 14	BRI; 11	MSP; 26	IOW; 25	CHI; 23	LVS; 13	TAL; 27	MAR; 12	TEX; 12	PHO; 26	HOM; 27				17th	605
2016	Cody Coughlin	18	Toyota	DAY; 31	ATL																								30th	147
2016	Kyle Busch	18	Toyota			MAR; 1*	KAN	DOV	CLT; 2	TEX	IOW	GTW	KEN; 30	ELD	POC	BRI	MCH	MSP	CHI; 1*	NHA	LVS	TAL							30th	147
2016	Harrison Burton	18	Toyota																				MAR; 22	TEX					30th	147
2016	Noah Gragson	18	Toyota																						PHO; 16	HOM; 15			30th	147
2017	Noah Gragson	18	Toyota	DAY; 26	ATL; 15	MAR; 4	KAN; 28	CLT; 9	DOV; 9	TEX; 7	GTW; 9	IOW; 6	KEN; 5	ELD; 7	POC; 24	MCH; 7	BRI; 15	MSP; 2	CHI; 8	NHA; 15	LVS; 13	TAL; 14	MAR; 1	TEX; 10	PHO; 15	HOM; 18			12th	724
2018	Noah Gragson	18	Toyota	DAY; 23	ATL; 2	LVS; 12	MAR; 5	DOV; 20	KAN; 1*	CLT; 8	TEX; 10	IOW; 2	GTW; 10*	CHI; 4	KEN; 8*	ELD; 6		MCH; 4*	BRI; 9	MSP; 9*	LVS; 18	TAL; 13	MAR; 7	TEX; 10	PHO; 2	HOM; 3			2nd	4034
2018	Erik Jones	18	Toyota														POC; 2												2nd	4034
2019	Harrison Burton	18	Toyota	DAY; 18	ATL; 8	LVS; 5	MAR; 11	TEX; 31	DOV; 3	KAN; 10	CLT; 11	TEX; 5	IOW; 3	GTW; 16	CHI; 4	KEN; 3	POC; 3	ELD; 31	MCH; 11	BRI; 23	MSP; 21	LVS; 9	TAL; 11	MAR; 18	PHO; 7	HOM; 13			13th	707
2020	Christian Eckes	18	Toyota	DAY; 22	LVS; 23	CLT; 14	ATL; 3	HOM; 8	POC; 33	KEN; 6	TEX; 2	KAN; 13	KAN; 2	MCH; 2	DRC; 12	DOV; 11	GTW; 32	DAR; 5	RCH; 18	BRI; 12	LVS; 8	TAL; 18	KAN; 6	TEX; 25	MAR; 4	PHO; 4			9th	2238
2021	Chandler Smith	18	Toyota	DAY; 9*	DRC; 12	LVS; 19	ATL; 35	BRD; 34	RCH; 4	KAN; 11	DAR; 27	COA; 33	CLT; 6	TEX; 5	NSH; 13*	POC; 25	KNX; 2*	GLN; 40	GTW; 28	DAR; 7	BRI; 1	LVS; 35	TAL; 19	MAR; 4	PHO; 1				12th	576
2022	Chandler Smith	18	Toyota	DAY; 21	LVS; 1*	ATL; 4	COA; 5	MAR; 6	BRD; 19	DAR; 21	KAN; 4	TEX; 8	CLT; 8	GTW; 3	SON; 5	KNX; 13	NSH; 15	MOH; 6	POC; 1*	IRP; 18	RCH; 1*	KAN; 6	BRI; 9*	TAL; 14	HOM; 10	PHO; 3			3rd	4034

=== Truck No. 46 history ===
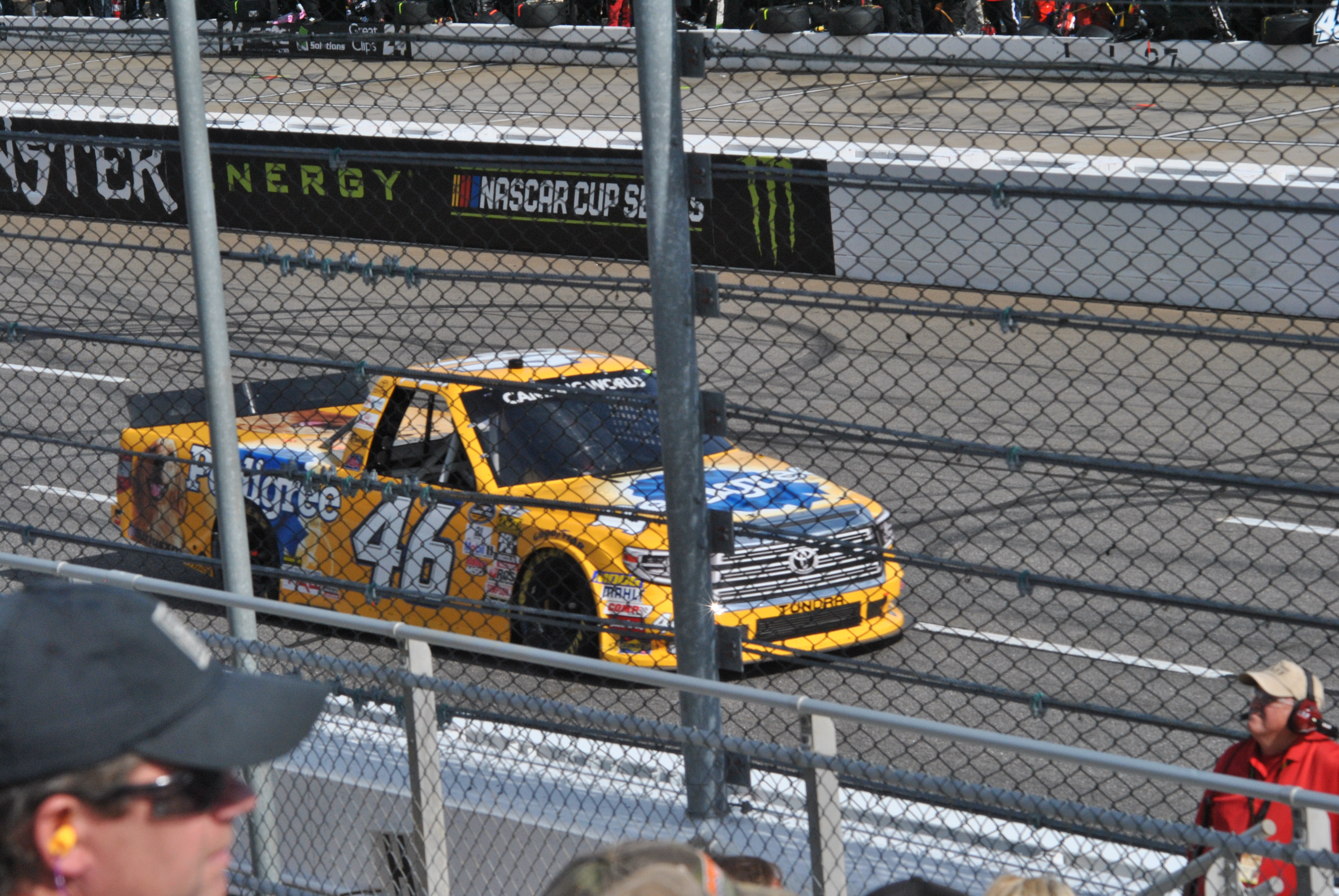
Todd Gilliland in the No. 46 at Martinsville Speedway in 2017

Multiple Drivers (2017–2019)

In 2017, KBM formed the No. 46 team with sponsorship from Pedigree Petfoods and Banfield Pet Hospital. Todd Gilliland drove the No. 46 with Pedigree sponsorship at Dover and Martinsville, scoring a top 5 at Martinsville, finishing 5th, while Kyle Busch drove the Banfield-sponsored No. 46 at Kentucky and Bristol, winning at the latter. The team returned in 2018 with Brandon Jones at Charlotte and Riley Herbst at the second Las Vegas race. The team also returned in 2019, with drivers such as Raphaël Lessard, Riley Herbst, and Chandler Smith.

==== Truck No. 46 results ====
Year	Driver	No.	Make	1	2	3	4	5	6	7	8	9	10	11	12	13	14	15	16	17	18	19	20	21	22	23	Owner	Pts
2017	Todd Gilliland	46	Toyota	DAY	ATL	MAR	KAN	CLT	DOV; 20	TEX	GTW	IOW											MAR; 5	TEX	PHO	HOM	31st	161
2017	Kyle Busch	46	Toyota										KEN; 6	ELD	POC	MCH	BRI; 1*	MSP	CHI	NHA	LVS	TAL					31st	161
2018	Brandon Jones	46	Toyota	DAY	ATL	LVS	MAR	DOV	KAN	CLT; 3	TEX																31st	154
2018	Christian Eckes	46	Toyota									IOW; 8	GTW; 28	CHI	KEN	ELD	POC	MCH	BRI	MSP			MAR; 9	TEX	PHO; 9	HOM	31st	154
2018	Riley Herbst	46	Toyota																		LVS; 29	TAL					31st	154
2019	Raphaël Lessard	46	Toyota	DAY	ATL	LVS	MAR; 14	TEX	DOV; 11											BRI; 12	MSP	LVS	TAL	MAR			27th	216
2019	Riley Herbst	46	Toyota							KAN; 9	CLT	TEX	IOW; 15														27th	216
2019	Chandler Smith	46	Toyota											GTW; 4	CHI	KEN	POC	ELD	MCH						PHO; 3	HOM	27th	216

=== Truck No. 51 history ===
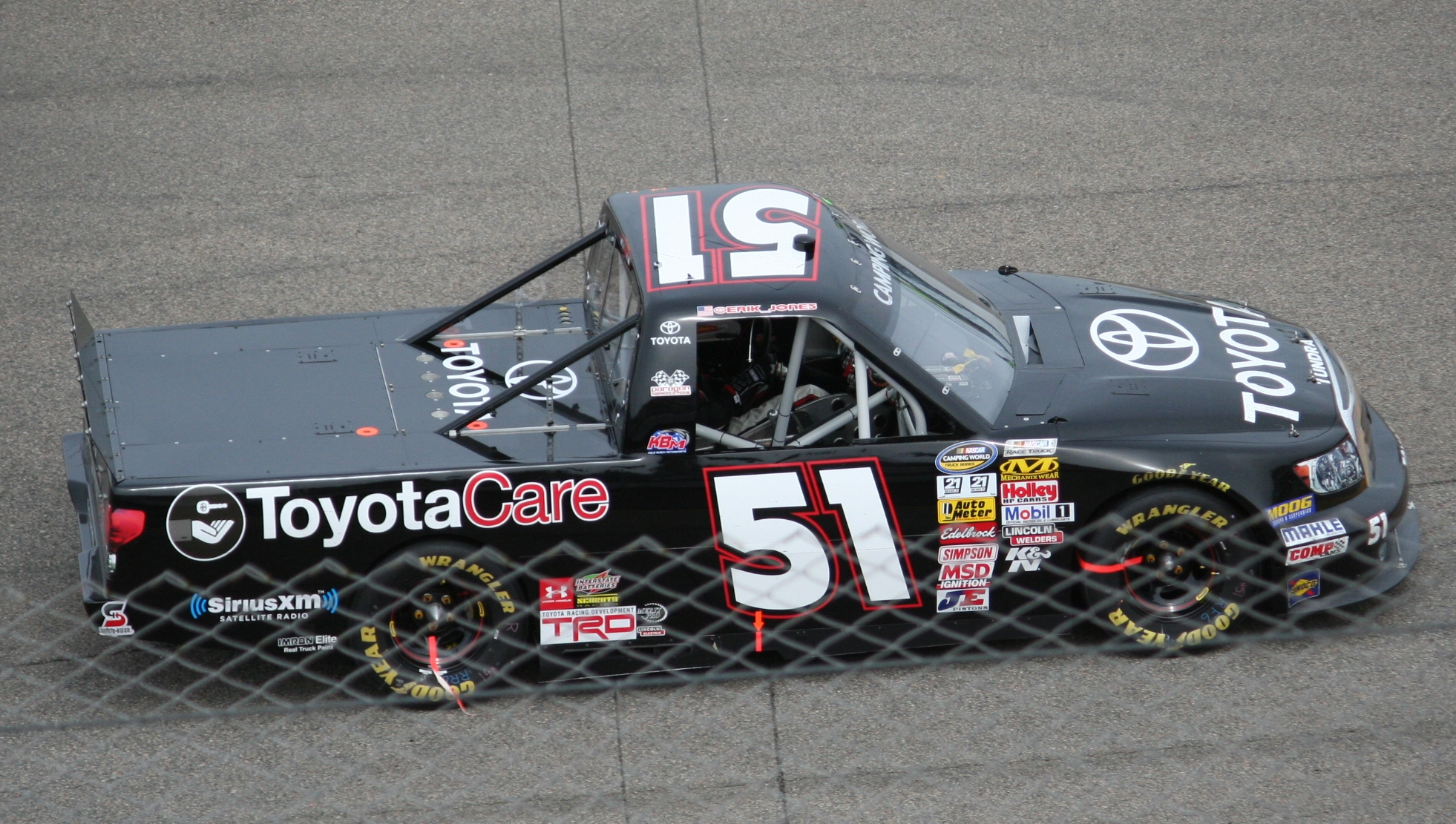
Erik Jones driving the No. 51 truck at Rockingham in 2013

Part-time (2011–2012)

The No. 51 was previously used by Busch at Billy Ballew Motorsports, a reverse of the team's No. 15 and a tribute to both the late Bobby Hamilton and the film Days of Thunder. In 2011, NASCAR Corona Series champion Germán Quiroga made his first Truck Series start in the No. 51 with Telcel as a sponsor at New Hampshire Motor Speedway in the New England 175. Quiroga finished a solid 16th, but 3 laps down. He would run the truck again in the season finale at Homestead, finishing 26th. Josh Richards ran four races in the No. 51 with Joy Mining Equipment, scoring a best finish of 13th at Talladega.

In July 2012, the team announced that Quiroga would return to the No. 51 truck for four races: Talladega Superspeedway on October 6, Texas Motor Speedway on November 2, Phoenix International Raceway on November 9 and Homestead–Miami Speedway on November 16, with sponship from Net10 Wireless. Denny Hamlin drove the truck at Martinsville Speedway on October 27, 2012, with sponsorship from Toyota and earned Kyle Busch Motorsports their first Truck Series win of the 2012 season.

Multiple drivers (2013–2023)

In 2013, the No. 51 became a full-time team, with Busch running 11 races. 16-year-old driver Erik Jones ran 5 races, while Scott Bloomquist ran the Mudsummer Classic. On November 8, 2013, Jones won the Lucas Oil 150 at Phoenix International Raceway, the youngest winner of a Truck Series race at the time at 17 years, 5 months, and 9 days. Busch would go on to win the season finale Ford EcoBoost 200 at Homestead–Miami Speedway the next week. The No. 51 would win the 2013 Camping World Truck Series owner's title, barely edging the ThorSport Racing No. 88 team of driver's champion Matt Crafton. It was the second owner's championship for Kyle Busch Motorsports.

In 2014, Kyle Busch and Erik Jones split the No. 51 truck, with Busch driving 10 races and Jones driving 12 races. Eric Phillips served as the crew chief. Dollar General sponsored the truck at Kentucky, Bristol, and Chicagoland with Busch driving and at Phoenix with Jones driving. Busch won the season-opener at Daytona along with his next four starts in the No. 51 truck at Kansas, Charlotte, Dover, and Kentucky. Erik Jones won at Iowa, Las Vegas, and Phoenix. The team won its second consecutive owner's championship, with 10 wins among the two drivers.

For 2015, Busch shared the ride with JGR Xfinity Series driver Daniel Suárez, ARCA Racing Series driver Matt Tifft and late model racer Christopher Bell, while Jones will move into a third full-time ride (No. 4). Busch drove the truck at Pocono, Michigan, and New Hampshire, winning at Pocono and Michigan. Bell scored a top five finish in his debut at Iowa Speedway.

For 2016, Suárez split the ride with Cody Coughlin, with the two drivers slated to contest a minimum of 10 races each. Suárez collected his first truck win in the 51 at Phoenix late in the season.

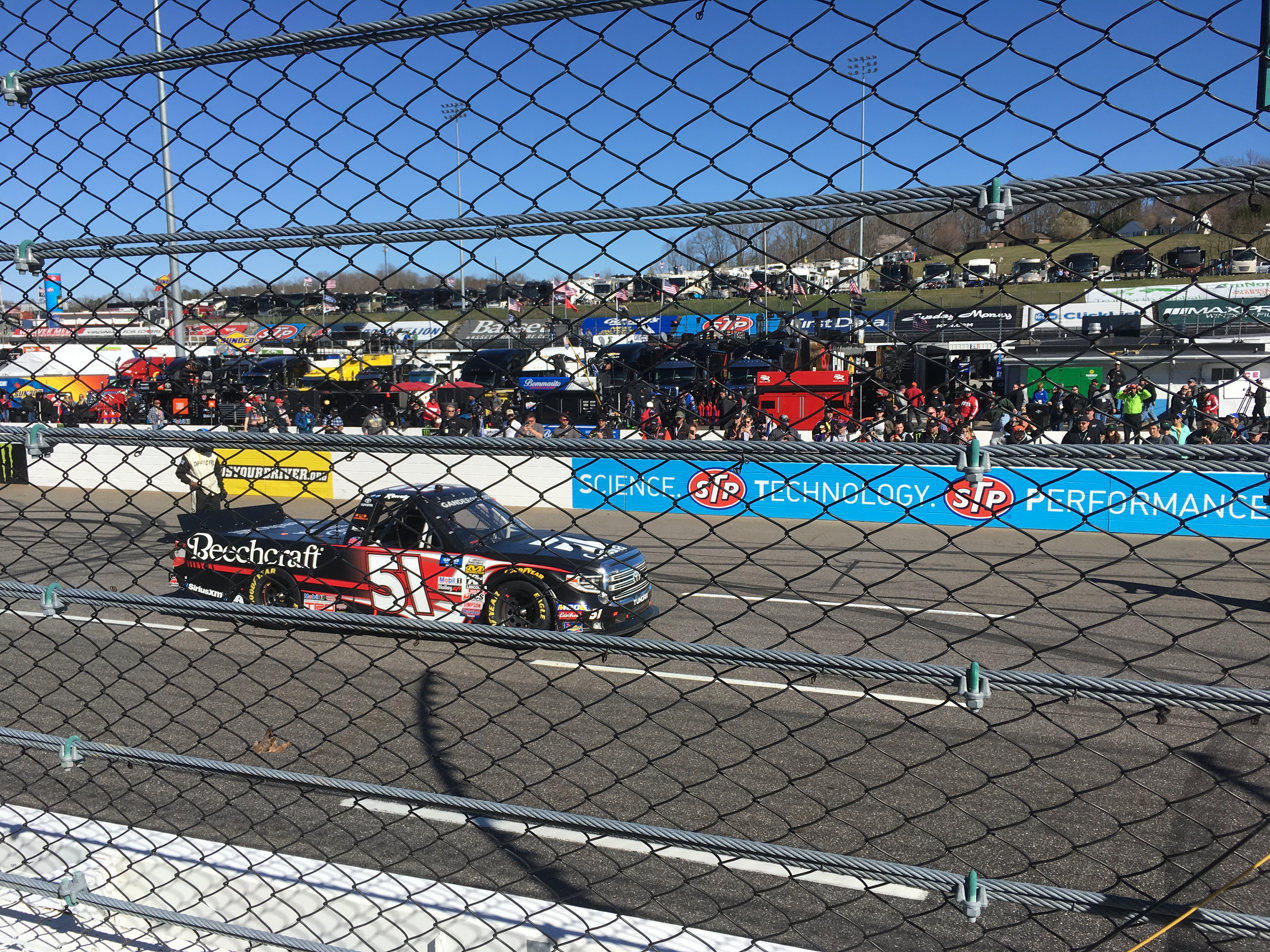
Owner Kyle Busch driving the No. 51 truck at Martinsville in 2019

In 2017, it was announced that multiple drivers would run the full schedule. Owner Kyle Busch ran five races with Textron Aviation as the primary sponsor. It was later announced that Harrison Burton would run six races and Todd Gilliland in four. Myatt Snider contested eight races with Louisiana Hot Sauce as the primary sponsor. Busch won at Kansas and Charlotte in the truck, while Gilliland put up impressive numbers in his starts, posting a top 5 at Loudon and two top tens. Burton scored a top 5 in his last race in the truck at Martinsville, and Snider collected three top 10s in his eight starts.

KBM announced that the No. 51 would return running the full schedule with multiple drivers again in 2018. Burton returned for nine races, and owner Busch for three races. Spencer Davis was added to the team for four races, and Brandon Jones, a JGR Xfinity driver, was also added for four races, and Riley Herbst joined the team for his debut at Gateway Motorsports Park. David Gilliland was also a driver for Talladega. In 2020, the truck ran full-time with drivers Kyle Busch, Chandler Smith, Riley Herbst, Brandon Jones, and Alex Tagliani. Jones picked up his first career Truck Series win at Pocono, beating eventual champion Sheldon Creed. In 2021, the truck was split between Busch, Drew Dollar, Corey Heim, Brian Brown, Parker Chase and Martin Truex Jr. Brown, Dollar, Chase, and Heim were all making their series debuts. Busch won at Atlanta and Truex won at Bristol Dirt.

The No. 51 would run the full season again in 2022, with Corey Heim running most of the races, winning 2 so far, Kyle Busch ran 5 and won at Sonoma Raceway. Buddy Kofoid would also run 2 dirt events at Bristol Motor Speedway and Knoxville Raceway.

For the team's first season with Chevrolet, the No. 51 will return as the multi-driver truck in 2023 with Busch running five races and Jack Wood running a minimum of 10 races. Busch scored a win at Las Vegas. On April 6, the No. 51 was docked 10 driver and owner points for illegal modifications of the engine oil reservoir tank prior to the Texas race. Busch scored the team's 100th win at Pocono.

==== Truck No. 51 results ====
Year	Driver	No.	Make	1	2	3	4	5	6	7	8	9	10	11	12	13	14	15	16	17	18	19	20	21	22	23	24	25	Owner	Pts
2011	Josh Richards	51	Toyota	DAY	PHO	DAR	MAR	NSH	DOV	CLT	KAN	TEX	KEN	IOW	NSH	IRP	POC	MCH	BRI; 17	ATL	CHI		KEN; 34	LVS; Wth	TAL; 13	MAR; 28	TEX		36th	153
2011	Germán Quiroga	51	Toyota																			NHA; 16						HOM; 26	36th	153
2012	Germán Quiroga	51	Toyota	DAY	MAR	CAR	KAN	CLT	DOV	TEX	KEN	IOW	CHI	POC	MCH	BRI	ATL	IOW	KEN	LVS	TAL; 8		TEX; 28	PHO; 24	HOM; 15				38th	148
2012	Denny Hamlin	51	Toyota																			MAR; 1							38th	148
2013	Kyle Busch	51	Toyota	DAY; 2			KAN; 27	CLT; 1*	DOV; 1		KEN; 3				MCH; 2	BRI; 1			CHI; 1^{*}		TAL; 10		TEX; 28		HOM; 1				1st	804
2013	Erik Jones	51	Toyota		MAR; 9	CAR; 9						IOW; 2						IOW; 9						PHO; 1*					1st	804
2013	Chad Hackenbracht	51	Toyota							TEX; 26				POC; 15			MSP; 2			LVS; 17									1st	804
2013	Scott Bloomquist	51	Toyota										ELD; 25																1st	804
2013	Denny Hamlin	51	Toyota																			MAR; 6							1st	804
2014	Kyle Busch	51	Toyota	DAY; 1		KAN; 1*	CLT; 1*	DOV; 1*			KEN; 1*				MCH; 5	BRI; 24		CHI; 1*					TEX; 1*		HOM; 4				1st	857
2014	Erik Jones	51	Toyota		MAR; 18				TEX; 11	GTW; 23		IOW; 1*	ELD; 29	POC; 6			MSP; 3		NHA; 7	LVS; 1	TAL; 6	MAR; 4		PHO; 1*					1st	857
2015	Daniel Suárez	51	Toyota	DAY; 9	ATL; 4	MAR; 6	KAN; 6		DOV; 2	TEX; 2			KEN; 4				BRI; 30		CHI; 4				MAR; 16	TEX; 2	PHO; 4	HOM; 30			7th	774
2015	Matt Tifft	51	Toyota					CLT; 8			GTW; 25			ELD; 21				MSP; 23			LVS; 19	TAL; 23							7th	774
2015	Christopher Bell	51	Toyota									IOW; 5																	7th	774
2015	Kyle Busch	51	Toyota												POC; 1*	MCH; 1*				NHA; 11									7th	774
2016	Daniel Suárez	51	Toyota	DAY; 28	ATL; 31	MAR; 18		DOV; 2	CLT; 23		IOW; 6		KEN; 11			BRI; 29			CHI; 11				MAR; 6	TEX; 5	PHO; 1	HOM; 6			13th	406
2016	Cody Coughlin	51	Toyota				KAN; 27			TEX; 12				ELD; 19	POC; 13		MCH; 20			NHA; 20	LVS; 17	TAL; 31							13th	406
2016	Erik Jones	51	Toyota									GTW; 5																	13th	406
2016	Gary Klutt	51	Toyota															MSP; 11											13th	406
2017	Myatt Snider	51	Toyota	DAY; 10						TEX; 16			KEN; 16						CHI; 10		LVS; 28	TAL; 3		TEX; 12		HOM; 12			4th	4025
2017	Kyle Busch	51	Toyota		ATL; 26		KAN; 1*	CLT; 1*							POC; 25*	MCH; 3*													4th	4025
2017	Harrison Burton	51	Toyota			MAR; 13			DOV; 13			IOW; 11		ELD; 15			BRI; 18						MAR; 4						4th	4025
2017	Todd Gilliland	51	Toyota								GTW; 21							MSP; 11		NHA; 3					PHO; 7				4th	4025
2018	Spencer Davis	51	Toyota	DAY; 7	ATL; 13						TEX; 9							MCH; 22											7th	2238
2018	Kyle Busch	51	Toyota			LVS; 1*				CLT; 2							POC; 1*												7th	2238
2018	Harrison Burton	51	Toyota				MAR; 8	DOV; 5				IOW; 3								MSP; 13			MAR; 8	TEX; 6	PHO; 3*	HOM; 11			7th	2238
2018	Brandon Jones	51	Toyota						KAN; 9					CHI; 5	KEN; 4						LVS; 26								7th	2238
2018	Riley Herbst	51	Toyota										GTW; 8																7th	2238
2018	Logan Seavey	51	Toyota													ELD; 8													7th	2238
2018	Christopher Bell	51	Toyota																BRI; 28										7th	2238
2018	David Gilliland	51	Toyota																			TAL; 3							7th	2238
2019	Christian Eckes	51	Toyota	DAY; 22										GTW; 14*			POC; 4	ELD; 6	MCH; 15			LVS; 3		MAR; 17		HOM; 3			1st	4034
2019	Kyle Busch	51	Toyota		ATL; 1*	LVS; 1*	MAR; 1*	TEX; 1*			CLT; 1*																		1st	4034
2019	Brandon Jones	51	Toyota						DOV; 13	KAN; 5					CHI; 2	KEN; 23									PHO; 2				1st	4034
2019	Greg Biffle	51	Toyota									TEX; 1																	1st	4034
2019	Chandler Smith	51	Toyota										IOW; 8							BRI; 2									1st	4034
2019	Alex Tagliani	51	Toyota																		MSP; 2								1st	4034
2019	Riley Herbst	51	Toyota																				TAL; 3						1st	4034
2020	Riley Herbst	51	Toyota	DAY; 12																									6th	2243
2020	Kyle Busch	51	Toyota		LVS; 1*	CLT; 2	ATL; 21*	HOM; 1*			TEX; 1*																		6th	2243
2020	Brandon Jones	51	Toyota						POC; 1			KAN; 14	KAN; 8												MAR; 17				6th	2243
2020	Chandler Smith	51	Toyota							KEN; 22				MCH; 38		DOV; 20	GTW; 23	DAR; 23	RCH; 12	BRI; 5	LVS; 5	TAL; 3	KAN; 5	TEX; 21		PHO; 3			6th	2243
2020	Alex Tagliani	51	Toyota												DAY; 22														6th	2243
2021	Drew Dollar	51	Toyota	DAY; 10									CLT; 20	TEX; 33	NSH; 24						BRI; 34	LVS; 24	TAL; 35		PHO; 18				10th	2090
2021	Parker Chase	51	Toyota		DAY; 23																								10th	2090
2021	Kyle Busch	51	Toyota			LVS; 2	ATL; 1		RCH; 2	KAN; 1						POC; 2													10th	2090
2021	Martin Truex, Jr.	51	Toyota					BRI; 1																					10th	2090
2021	Corey Heim	51	Toyota								DAR; 23							GLN; 13						MAR; 11					10th	2090
2021	Parker Chase	51	Toyota									COA; 18																	10th	2090
2021	Brian Brown	51	Toyota														KNX; 8												10th	2090
2021	Derek Griffith	51	Toyota																GTW; 26										10th	2090
2021	Dylan Lupton	51	Toyota																	DAR; 31									10th	2090
2022	Corey Heim	51	Toyota	DAY; 32		ATL; 1				DAR; 23	KAN; 33	TEX; 7		GTW; 1			NSH; 33	MOH; 26	POC; 4	IRP; 5	RCH; 5	KAN; 7	BRI; 10	TAL; 26	HOM; 5	PHO; 7			7th	2262
2022	Kyle Busch	51	Toyota		LVS; 2		COA; 3	MAR; 3					CLT; 7		SON; 1														7th	2262
2022	Buddy Kofoid	51	Toyota						BRI; 27							KNX; 11													7th	2262
2023	Jack Wood	51	Chevy	DAY; 27		ATL; 10		TEX; 9						CLT; 18	GTW; 29	NSH; 30	MOH; 31			IRP; 18		KAN; 16	BRI; 36	TAL; 14	HOM; 12	PHO; 27			10th	2105
2023	Kyle Busch	51	Chevy		LVS; 1*		COA; 2			MAR; 3	KAN; 7							POC; 1											10th	2105
2023	William Byron	51	Chevy						BRD; 3			DAR; 4	NWS; 11																10th	2105
2023	Matt Mills	51	Chevy																RCH; 5		MLW; 25								10th	2105

=== Truck No. 54 history ===
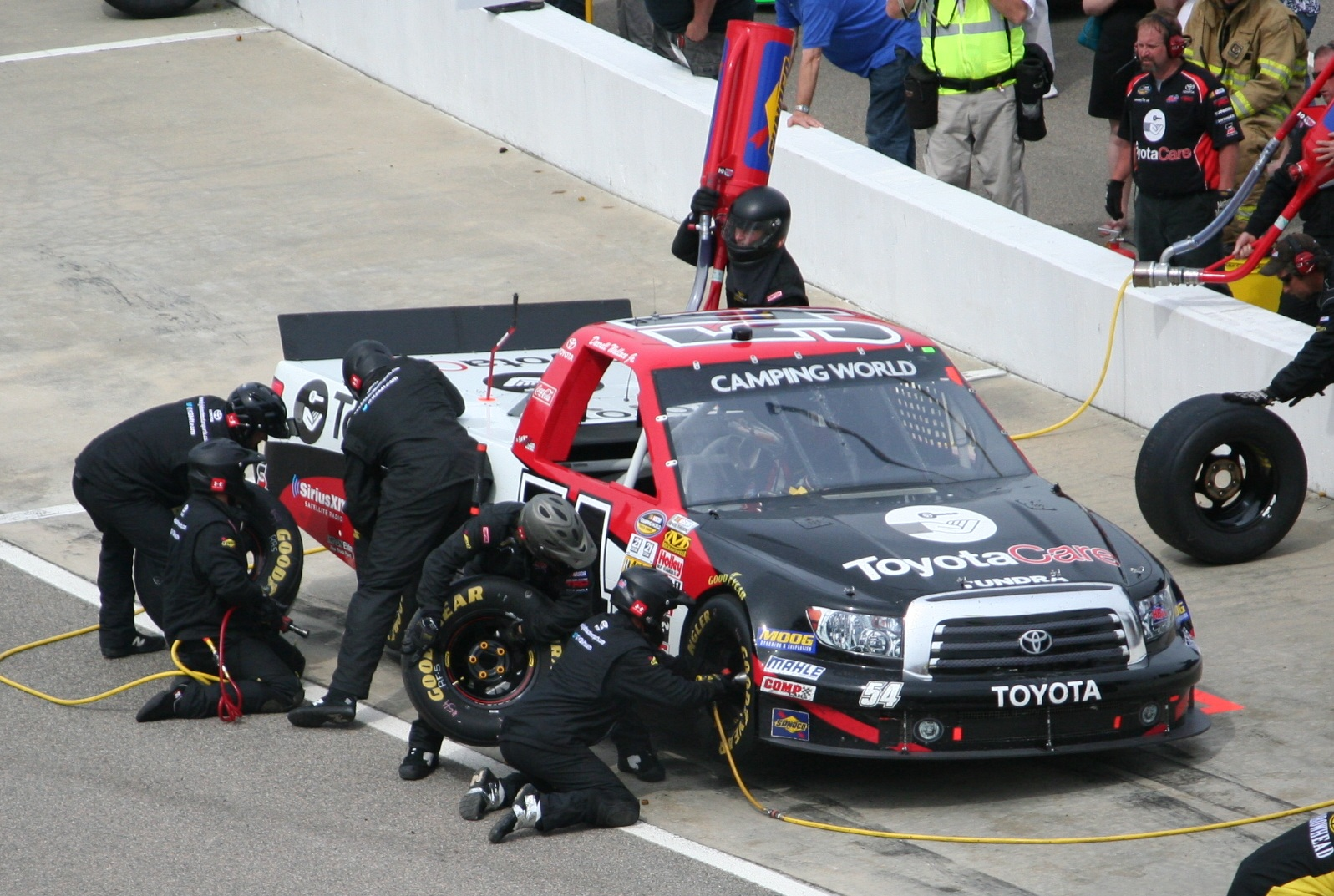
Bubba Wallace's 2013 truck

Bubba Wallace (2013–2014)

In 2013, Joe Gibbs Racing development driver Bubba Wallace ran the full season in the No. 54 Toyota with sponsorship from ToyotaCare and Camping World/Good Sam Club. Wallace won his first race at Martinsville Speedway in the Kroger 200, and would finish 8th in points.

In 2014, Wallace ran his second full-time season in the No. 54. In June, Wallace won the Drivin' for Linemen 200 at Gateway Motorsports Park. Three weeks later, he battled Kyle Larson and Ron Hornaday Jr. for the win at Eldora Speedway. Wallace Jr. held off a hard charging Larson, who wrecked his car trying to catch him, and beat Hornaday by a 5.489-second margin to win the second annual Mudsummer Classic. Wallace switched to the No. 34 for the Kroger 200 at Martinsville in tribute to Wendell Scott, and led the most laps en route to his second straight victory in the race. Wallace won his final race with KBM, the season finale at Homestead–Miami Speedway, beating Larson again to earn his first non-short track victory. Wallace's four wins along with nine top fives and 14 top tens led to a third-place finish in points.

Multiple Drivers (2015)

Former ARCA Racing Series rookie of the year and Joe Gibbs Racing development driver Justin Boston signed to run the full 2015 season in the No. 54. After nine races and while sitting 12th in the points standings, Boston left the team. Initial reports stated that Boston and KBM parted ways due to lack of performance and requests for internal changes by Boston not being met. A later report, however, stated that KBM released Boston due to sponsor Zloop breaching its agreement with the team. The company had initially signed on to be the primary sponsor, but only appeared in two races. KBM would later sue Boston and Zloop (owned by Boston's father) for $4.025 million in defaulted payments. Boston was replaced by Toyota development driver Christopher Bell at Kentucky, where he was involved in a crash. In his next start, however, Bell battled with rookie Bobby Pierce at Eldora Speedway and won the race after a Green White Checkered finish. It was the second consecutive Eldora win for the No. 54 team. Matt Tifft drove the truck at Pocono, finishing eighth. JGR development driver Cody Coughlin was signed to drive the truck at Michigan, with backing from family sponsor JEGS. Kyle Busch drove the 54 at Bristol. Gray Gaulding drove the No. 54 in three races, with sponsorship from Krispy Kreme.

==== Truck No. 54 results ====
Year	Driver	No.	Make	1	2	3	4	5	6	7	8	9	10	11	12	13	14	15	16	17	18	19	20	21	22	23	Owner	Pts
2013	Bubba Wallace	54	Toyota	DAY; 12	MAR; 5	CAR; 27	KAN; 7	CLT; 27	DOV; 10	TEX; 6	KEN; 28	IOW; 8	ELD; 7	POC; 7	MCH; 21	BRI; 28	MSP; 4	IOW; 5	CHI; 11	LVS; 5	TAL; 17	MAR; 1*	TEX; 7	PHO; 20	HOM; 15		10th	704
2014	Bubba Wallace	54	Toyota	DAY; 26	MAR; 2	KAN; 15	CLT; 26	DOV; 16	TEX; 10	GTW; 1*	KEN; 2	IOW; 13	ELD; 1*	POC; 8	MCH; 11*	BRI; 2	MSP; 12	CHI; 6	NHA; 2	LVS; 2*	TAL; 9		TEX; 26	PHO; 6	HOM; 1		4th	799
2014	Bubba Wallace	34	Toyota																			MAR; 1*					4th	799
2015	Justin Boston	54	Toyota	DAY; 29	ATL; 16	MAR; 10	KAN; 7	CLT; 9	DOV; 25	TEX; 8	GTW; 27	IOW; 11															13th	712
2015	Christopher Bell	54	Toyota										KEN; 17	ELD; 1*							LVS; 14	TAL; 13		TEX; 8		HOM; 25	13th	712
2015	Matt Tifft	54	Toyota												POC; 8				CHI; 9						PHO; 8		13th	712
2015	Cody Coughlin	54	Toyota													MCH; 20											13th	712
2015	Kyle Busch	54	Toyota														BRI; 2										13th	712
2015	Gray Gaulding	54	Toyota															MSP; 11		NHA; 10			MAR; 21				13th	712

=== Truck No. 56 history ===
Part Time (2010)

The 2010 season started with Tayler Malsam in the No. 56 Toyota Tundra. Early in the season after seven races, it was announced that Malsam was signed by Braun Racing to take over in their No. 10 Toyota in the Nationwide Series. With no driver or sponsorship, the No. 56 team shut down immediately.

==== Truck No. 56 results ====
Year	Driver	No.	Make	1	2	3	4	5	6	7	8	9	10	11	12	13	14	15	16	17	18	19	20	21	22	23	24	25	Owner	Pts
2010	Tayler Malsam	56	Toyota	DAY; 17	ATL; 13	MAR; 14	NSH; 17	KAN; 22	DOV; 20	CLT; 13	TEX	MCH	IOW	GTY	IRP	POC	NSH	DAR	BRI	CHI	KEN	NHA	LVS	MAR	TAL	TEX	PHO	HOM	36th	798

== ARCA Menards Series ==
=== Car No. 18 history ===
In 2022, KBM fielded the No. 18 Toyota Camry for Sammy Smith and Drew Dollar in the ARCA Menards Series.

==== Car no. 18 results ====
ARCA Menards Series results
Year	Driver	No.	Make	1	2	3	4	5	6	7	8	9	10	11	12	13	14	15	16	17	18	19	20	AMSC	Pts
2022	Drew Dollar	18	Toyota	DAY; 19		TAL; 7*	KAN; 15	CLT; 24																1st	1016
2022	Sammy Smith	18	Toyota		PHO; 3*				IOW; 2	BLN; 1	ELK; 1*	MOH; 3	POC; 12	IRP; 2	MCH; 4	GLN; 5	ISF; 4	MLW; 1*	DSF; 3	KAN; 3	BRI; 1*	SLM; 1**	TOL; 1	1st	1016

== ARCA Menards Series East ==
=== Car No. 18 history ===
In 2022, KBM fielded the No. 18 Toyota Camry full time for Sammy Smith.

==== Car no. 18 results ====
ARCA Menards Series East results
Year	Driver	No.	Make	1	2	3	4	5	6	7	AMSEC	Pts
2022	Sammy Smith	18	Toyota	NSM; 1*	FIF; 1*	DOV; 5	NSV; 1*	IOW; 2*	MLW; 1*	BRI; 1*	1st	375

== ARCA Menards Series West ==
=== Car No. 18 history ===
In 2022, Sammy Smith drove the No. 18 Toyota Camry in the season opener and season finale, both at Phoenix. Smith won the season finale.

==== Car no. 18 results ====
ARCA Menards Series West results
Year	Driver	No.	Make	1	2	3	4	5	6	7	8	9	10	11	AMSWC	Pts
2022	Sammy Smith	18	Toyota	PHO; 3*	IRW	KCR	PIR	SON	IRW	EVG	PIR	AAS	LVS	PHO; 1*	24th	143
