= Brian Brown (racing driver) =

American racing driver (born 1978)

- Born: Brian K. Brown; October 19, 1978 (age 48) Higginsville, Missouri, U.S.
- Relatives: Danny Lasoski (uncle)

World of Outlaws career
- Current team: Brian Brown Racing
- Car number: 21

Previous series
- Superstar Racing Experience: 2021

Championship titles
- 2007, 2010, 2019–2020 2002: Knoxville 410 Sprints; Knoxville 360 Sprints

NASCAR FedEx Freight Truck Series career
- 1 race run over 1 year
- 2021 position: 59th
- Best finish: 59th (2021)
- First race: 2021 Corn Belt 150 (Knoxville)
Wins	Top tens	Poles
0	1	0
- Statistics up to date as of December 30, 2021.

Brian K. Brown (born October 19, 1978) is an American professional dirt track racing driver who primarily competes in sprint car racing such as the World of Outlaws for his team Brian Brown Racing. He is a five-time track champion at Knoxville Raceway with four in the 410 sprint car class and one in the 360 division.

Brown has also competed in the NASCAR Camping World Truck Series and Superstar Racing Experience.

== Racing career ==
In 1999, Brown won Rookie of the Year honors at Missouri State Fair Speedway while driving for his uncle Danny Lasoski. The following year, he claimed the Missouri State Fair's Winged Outlaw Warrior championship with 11 feature race wins.

Brown began racing at Knoxville in 2002 for Lasoski, a seven-time champion at the track. Competing in the 360-cubic-inch sprint car division, he won six races, including three in a row, en route to the championship. He moved up to the 410 class in 2003 with new car owner Lonny Parsons, with whom he won his first 410 race and Rookie of the Year as he placed seventh in points. After one year with Parsons, Brown joined Tim and Gina Doogs. After finishing second in the 2006 410 standings by five points, Brown won the next season's championship. He was also awarded the Hard Charger in the 2007 Knoxville Nationals.

In 2008, Brown formed his own team, Brian Brown Racing. A second Knoxville 410 title came in 2010 as he won 12 races; he also started on the pole position in that year's Nationals. From 2012 to 2014, he finished second three consecutive times in the Nationals. In 2014, he won his first World of Outlaws Sprint Car Series race at Charlotte Motor Speedway.

Brown won a fourth Knoxville 410 championship in 2019, and also scored his first World of Outlaws victory at the track. He repeated as champion the next year, a campaign that saw him win his 50th career race at Knoxville.

In May 2021, Brown set the fastest lap time in Knoxville history at 14.351 seconds to surpass the record set by Brooke Tatnell of 14.407 in 2006. A month later, he joined the Superstar Racing Experience for the Knoxville race, where he drove a multi-driver local track champions car; he finished eighth in the feature. In July, he made his NASCAR Camping World Truck Series debut at Knoxville in the No. 51 for Kyle Busch Motorsports.

== Motorsports career results ==
=== NASCAR ===
(key) (Bold – Pole position awarded by qualifying time. Italics – Pole position earned by points standings or practice time. * – Most laps led.)

==== Camping World Truck Series ====
NASCAR Camping World Truck Series results
Year	Team	No.	Make	1	2	3	4	5	6	7	8	9	10	11	12	13	14	15	16	17	18	19	20	21	22	NCWTC	Pts	Ref
2021	Kyle Busch Motorsports	51	Toyota	DAY	DAY	LVS	ATL	BRI	RCH	KAN	DAR	COA	CLT	TEX	NSH	POC	KNX; 8	GLN	GTW	DAR	BRI	LVS	TAL	MAR	PHO	59th	29	

=== Superstar Racing Experience ===
(key) * – Most laps led. ^{1} – Heat 1 winner. ^{2} – Heat 2 winner.

Superstar Racing Experience results
Year	No.	1	2	3	4	5	6	SRXC	Pts
2021	21	STA	KNX; 8	ELD	IRP	SLG	NSV	19th	21

^{*} Season still in progress
^{1} Ineligible for series points
