= Pelon =

Pelon can refer to:

- Claude Pelon (born 1992), American American football defensive end
- Mario Pelón, alias of Mario Ramírez Treviño (1962–2025), Mexican drug lord
- Pelon Pelo Rico, Mexican candy brand

== See also ==
- Cerro Pelon (disambiguation)
