= 2023 Shriners Children's 200 =

11th race of the 2023 NASCAR Xfinity Series

Race details
- Race 11 of 33 of the 2023 NASCAR Xfinity Series
- Date: May 13, 2023
- Official name: 4th Annual Shriners Children's 200
- Location: Darlington Raceway, Darlington, South Carolina
- Course: Permanent racing facility
- Course length: 1.366 miles (2.198 km)
- Distance: 147 laps, 200 mi (323 km)
- Scheduled distance: 147 laps, 200 mi (323 km)
- Average speed: 91.924 mph (147.937 km/h)

Pole position
Driver	John Hunter Nemechek	Joe Gibbs Racing
- Time: 29.613

Most laps led
Driver	John Hunter Nemechek	Joe Gibbs Racing
- Laps: 57

Winner
No. 10	Kyle Larson	Kaulig Racing

Television in the United States
- Network: FOX
- Announcers: Adam Alexander, Ryan Blaney, and Michael Waltrip

Radio in the United States
- Radio: MRN

The 2023 Shriners Children's 200 was the 11th stock car race of the 2023 NASCAR Xfinity Series, and the 42nd iteration of the event. The race was held on Saturday, May 13, 2023, in Darlington, South Carolina at Darlington Raceway, a 1.366 miles (2.198 km) permanent egg-shaped racetrack. The race took the scheduled 147 laps to complete. In an exciting last-lap battle, Kyle Larson, driving for Kaulig Racing, would capture the win after making contact with John Hunter Nemechek on the final turn, causing Nemechek to spin on the frontstretch. This was Larson's 14th career NASCAR Xfinity Series win, and his first of the season. Larson and Nemechek would dominate the majority of the race, leading 46 and 57 laps, respectively. To fill out the podium, Justin Allgaier, driving for JR Motorsports, and Cole Custer, driving for Stewart-Haas Racing, would finish 2nd and 3rd, respectively.

== Background ==
Darlington Raceway is a race track built for NASCAR racing located near Darlington, South Carolina. It is nicknamed "The Lady in Black" and "The Track Too Tough to Tame" by many NASCAR fans and drivers and advertised as "A NASCAR Tradition." It is of a unique, somewhat egg-shaped design, an oval with the ends of very different configurations, a condition which supposedly arose from the proximity of one end of the track to a minnow pond the owner refused to relocate. This situation makes it very challenging for the crews to set up their cars' handling in a way that is effective at both ends.

=== Entry list ===
- (R) denotes rookie driver.
- (i) denotes driver who is ineligible for series driver points.

#	Driver	Team	Make	Sponsor or throwback
00	Cole Custer	Stewart-Haas Racing	Ford	Haas Automation - Jason Leffler's 2004 No. 00 Haas Automation paint scheme
1	Sam Mayer	JR Motorsports	Chevrolet	Accelerate Pros Talent - Kurt Busch's 2001 No. 97 Sharpie/Rubbermaid paint scheme
02	Blaine Perkins	Our Motorsports	Chevrolet	PayDay - Kevin Harvick's 2003 No. 21 PayDay paint scheme
2	Sheldon Creed	Richard Childress Racing	Chevrolet	Whelen - Kevin Harvick's 2001 No. 2 ACDelco paint scheme
3	Ty Dillon (i)	Richard Childress Racing	Chevrolet	Ferris Commercial Mowers - Tribute to Ferris' first race as a sponsor in 2003
4	Garrett Smithley	JD Motorsports	Chevrolet	Trophy Tractor
6	Brennan Poole	JD Motorsports	Chevrolet	511Auction.com
07	Stefan Parsons	SS-Green Light Racing	Chevrolet	Ollie's Bargain Outlet
7	Justin Allgaier	JR Motorsports	Chevrolet	BRANDT Heritage - Homage to the 70th anniversary of BRANDT Professional Agriculture
08	Gray Gaulding	SS-Green Light Racing	Ford	Panini Group
8	Josh Berry	JR Motorsports	Chevrolet	Tire Pros Love the Drive - Hut Stricklin's 1996-1998 No. 8 Circuit City paint scheme
9	Brandon Jones	JR Motorsports	Chevrolet	Cheez-It, Menards
10	Kyle Larson (i)	Kaulig Racing	Chevrolet	HendrickCars.com
11	Daniel Hemric	Kaulig Racing	Chevrolet	Cirkul
16	Chandler Smith (R)	Kaulig Racing	Chevrolet	Quick Tie Productions
18	Sammy Smith (R)	Joe Gibbs Racing	Toyota	Pilot Flying J - Homage to the 65th anniversary of Pilot Flying J
19	Ryan Truex	Joe Gibbs Racing	Toyota	Toyota Outfitters
20	John Hunter Nemechek	Joe Gibbs Racing	Toyota	Pye-Barker Fire & Safety
21	Austin Hill	Richard Childress Racing	Chevrolet	Bennett Transportation - Kevin Harvick's 2006 No. 21 Coast Guard paint scheme
24	Corey Heim (i)	Sam Hunt Racing	Toyota	GearWrench
25	Brett Moffitt	AM Racing	Ford	AM Technical Solutions - Tim Richmond's 1986-1987 No. 25 Folgers paint scheme
26	Kaz Grala	Sam Hunt Racing	Toyota	Fire Department Coffee - Vintage firetruck dedicating NASCAR fire and safety workers paint scheme
27	Jeb Burton	Jordan Anderson Racing	Chevrolet	Capital City Towing
28	Kyle Sieg	RSS Racing	Ford	Cedar Ridge Landscaping
31	Parker Retzlaff (R)	Jordan Anderson Racing	Chevrolet	FUNKAWAY
35	Patrick Emerling	Emerling-Gase Motorsports	Chevrolet	Emerling-Gase Motorsports
38	Joe Graf Jr.	RSS Racing	Ford	Bethel Motor Speedway - Tribute to Graf's early legends car paint scheme
39	Ryan Sieg	RSS Racing	Ford	CMR Construction & Roofing
43	Ryan Ellis	Alpha Prime Racing	Chevrolet	Keen Parts - Kevin Harvick's 2005 No. 29 GM Goodwrench Quicksilver paint scheme
44	Sage Karam	Alpha Prime Racing	Chevrolet	CRC Brakleen - Richard Childress' 1980 No. 3 CRC paint scheme
45	Jeffrey Earnhardt	Alpha Prime Racing	Chevrolet	BZ Mart, ForeverLawn - Dale Earnhardt's 1997 No. 3 Wheaties The Winston paint scheme
48	Parker Kligerman	Big Machine Racing	Chevrolet	Big Machine Spiked Coolers
51	Jeremy Clements	Jeremy Clements Racing	Chevrolet	First Pacific Funding - Geoff Bodine's 1985-1989 No. 5 Levi Garrett paint scheme
53	Matt Mills (i)	Emerling-Gase Motorsports	Ford	J. F. Electric - Herbie's paint scheme from Herbie: Fully Loaded
66	Chad Finchum	MBM Motorsports	Ford	Wild Willies - Eric McClure's 2011 No. 14 Hefty Black Out paint scheme
74	Dawson Cram	CHK Racing	Chevrolet	Magnum Contracting - Bob Keselowski's 1989 No. 29 Mopar paint scheme
77	Carson Hocevar (i)	Spire Motorsports	Chevrolet	Premier Security Solutions
78	Anthony Alfredo	B. J. McLeod Motorsports	Chevrolet	Dude Wipes - Dale Earnhardt Jr.'s 2017 No. 88 Nationwide paint scheme
91	Ross Chastain (i)	DGM Racing	Chevrolet	Florida Watermelon Association
92	Josh Williams	DGM Racing	Chevrolet	Call 811 Before You Dig - Kevin Harvick's 2005 No. 29 Pelon Pelo Rico paint scheme
98	Riley Herbst	Stewart-Haas Racing	Ford	Monster Energy - Tribute to Ken Block's rally car from Gymkhana 3
Official entry list

== Practice ==
The first and only practice session was held on Friday, May 12, at 5:05 PM EST, and would last for 20 minutes. Ryan Truex, driving for Joe Gibbs Racing, would set the fastest time in the session, with a lap of 29.874, and an average speed of 164.611 mph (264.916 km/h).

Pos.	#	Driver	Team	Make	Time	Speed
1	19	Ryan Truex	Joe Gibbs Racing	Toyota	29.874	164.611
2	20	John Hunter Nemechek	Joe Gibbs Racing	Toyota	30.061	163.587
3	7	Justin Allgaier	JR Motorsports	Chevrolet	30.143	163.142
Full practice results

== Qualifying ==
Qualifying was held on Friday, May 12, at 5:35 PM EST. Since Darlington Raceway is an intermediate racetrack, the qualifying system used is a single-car, single-lap system with only one round. In that round, whoever sets the fastest time will win the pole. John Hunter Nemechek, driving for Joe Gibbs Racing, would score the pole for the race, with a lap of 29.613, and an average speed of 166.062 mph (267.251 km/h).

Pos.	#	Driver	Team	Make	Time	Speed
1	20	John Hunter Nemechek	Joe Gibbs Racing	Toyota	29.613	166.062
2	19	Ryan Truex	Joe Gibbs Racing	Toyota	29.754	165.275
3	10	Kyle Larson (i)	Kaulig Racing	Chevrolet	29.789	165.081
4	1	Sam Mayer	JR Motorsports	Chevrolet	29.849	164.749
5	00	Cole Custer	Stewart-Haas Racing	Ford	29.880	164.578
6	16	Chandler Smith (R)	Kaulig Racing	Chevrolet	29.945	164.221
7	2	Sheldon Creed	Richard Childress Racing	Chevrolet	29.950	164.194
8	31	Parker Retzlaff (R)	Jordan Anderson Racing	Chevrolet	30.062	163.582
9	18	Sammy Smith (R)	Joe Gibbs Racing	Toyota	30.111	163.316
10	21	Austin Hill	Richard Childress Racing	Chevrolet	30.147	163.121
11	9	Brandon Jones	JR Motorsports	Chevrolet	30.168	163.007
12	11	Daniel Hemric	Kaulig Racing	Chevrolet	30.173	162.980
13	8	Josh Berry	JR Motorsports	Chevrolet	30.187	162.905
14	25	Brett Moffitt	AM Racing	Ford	30.202	162.824
15	27	Jeb Burton	Jordan Anderson Racing	Chevrolet	30.214	162.759
16	39	Ryan Sieg	RSS Racing	Ford	30.231	162.667
17	7	Justin Allgaier	JR Motorsports	Chevrolet	30.261	162.506
18	98	Riley Herbst	Stewart-Haas Racing	Ford	30.276	162.426
19	51	Jeremy Clements	Jeremy Clements Racing	Chevrolet	30.324	162.169
20	78	Anthony Alfredo	B. J. McLeod Motorsports	Chevrolet	30.379	161.875
21	91	Ross Chastain (i)	DGM Racing	Chevrolet	30.403	161.747
22	44	Sage Karam	Alpha Prime Racing	Chevrolet	30.412	161.699
23	48	Parker Kligerman	Big Machine Racing	Chevrolet	30.476	161.360
24	24	Corey Heim (i)	Sam Hunt Racing	Toyota	30.523	161.111
25	77	Carson Hocevar (i)	Spire Motorsports	Chevrolet	30.543	161.006
26	26	Kaz Grala	Sam Hunt Racing	Toyota	30.592	160.748
27	92	Josh Williams	DGM Racing	Chevrolet	30.642	160.486
28	07	Stefan Parsons	SS-Green Light Racing	Chevrolet	30.651	160.438
29	28	Kyle Sieg	RSS Racing	Ford	30.904	159.125
30	3	Ty Dillon (i)	Richard Childress Racing	Chevrolet	30.919	159.048
31	35	Patrick Emerling	Emerling-Gase Motorsports	Chevrolet	30.961	158.832
32	43	Ryan Ellis	Alpha Prime Racing	Chevrolet	30.993	158.668
33	45	Jeffrey Earnhardt	Alpha Prime Racing	Chevrolet	31.252	157.353
Qualified by owner's points
34	53	Matt Mills (i)	Emerling-Gase Motorsports	Ford	31.407	156.577
35	6	Brennan Poole	JD Motorsports	Chevrolet	31.442	156.402
36	08	Gray Gaulding	SS-Green Light Racing	Ford	31.520	156.015
37	38	Joe Graf Jr.	RSS Racing	Ford	–	–
38	02	Blaine Perkins	Our Motorsports	Chevrolet	–	–
Failed to qualify
39	4	Garrett Smithley	JD Motorsports	Chevrolet	31.387	156.676
40	66	Chad Finchum	MBM Motorsports	Ford	31.466	156.283
41	74	Dawson Cram	CHK Racing	Chevrolet	31.729	154.988
Official qualifying results
Official starting lineup

== Race results ==
Stage 1 Laps: 45

Pos.	#	Driver	Team	Make	Pts
1	10	Kyle Larson (i)	Kaulig Racing	Chevrolet	0
2	20	John Hunter Nemechek	Joe Gibbs Racing	Toyota	9
3	21	Austin Hill	Richard Childress Racing	Chevrolet	8
4	00	Cole Custer	Stewart-Haas Racing	Ford	7
5	1	Sam Mayer	JR Motorsports	Chevrolet	6
6	19	Ryan Truex	Joe Gibbs Racing	Toyota	5
7	2	Sheldon Creed	Richard Childress Racing	Chevrolet	4
8	9	Brandon Jones	JR Motorsports	Chevrolet	3
9	11	Daniel Hemric	Kaulig Racing	Chevrolet	2
10	25	Brett Moffitt	AM Racing	Ford	1

Stage 2 Laps: 45

Pos.	#	Driver	Team	Make	Pts
1	20	John Hunter Nemechek	Joe Gibbs Racing	Toyota	10
2	10	Kyle Larson (i)	Kaulig Racing	Chevrolet	0
3	7	Justin Allgaier	JR Motorsports	Chevrolet	8
4	1	Sam Mayer	JR Motorsports	Chevrolet	7
5	00	Cole Custer	Stewart-Haas Racing	Ford	6
6	21	Austin Hill	Richard Childress Racing	Chevrolet	5
7	39	Ryan Sieg	RSS Racing	Ford	4
8	8	Josh Berry	JR Motorsports	Chevrolet	3
9	48	Parker Kligerman	Big Machine Racing	Chevrolet	2
10	18	Sammy Smith (R)	Joe Gibbs Racing	Toyota	1

Stage 3 Laps: 57

Pos.	St	#	Driver	Team	Make	Laps	Led	Status	Pts
1	3	10	Kyle Larson (i)	Kaulig Racing	Chevrolet	147	46	Running	0
2	17	7	Justin Allgaier	JR Motorsports	Chevrolet	147	2	Running	43
3	5	00	Cole Custer	Stewart-Haas Racing	Ford	147	0	Running	47
4	10	21	Austin Hill	Richard Childress Racing	Chevrolet	147	2	Running	46
5	1	20	John Hunter Nemechek	Joe Gibbs Racing	Toyota	147	57	Running	51
6	25	77	Carson Hocevar (i)	Spire Motorsports	Chevrolet	147	3	Running	0
7	13	8	Josh Berry	JR Motorsports	Chevrolet	147	0	Running	33
8	4	1	Sam Mayer	JR Motorsports	Chevrolet	147	35	Running	42
9	26	26	Kaz Grala	Sam Hunt Racing	Toyota	147	0	Running	28
10	24	24	Corey Heim (i)	Sam Hunt Racing	Toyota	147	0	Running	27
11	9	18	Sammy Smith (R)	Joe Gibbs Racing	Toyota	147	0	Running	27
12	15	27	Jeb Burton	Jordan Anderson Racing	Chevrolet	147	0	Running	25
13	23	48	Parker Kligerman	Big Machine Racing	Chevrolet	147	0	Running	26
14	19	51	Jeremy Clements	Jeremy Clements Racing	Chevrolet	147	1	Running	23
15	20	78	Anthony Alfredo	B. J. McLeod Motorsports	Chevrolet	147	0	Running	22
16	12	11	Daniel Hemric	Kaulig Racing	Chevrolet	147	0	Running	23
17	27	92	Josh Williams	DGM Racing	Chevrolet	147	0	Running	20
18	21	91	Ross Chastain (i)	DGM Racing	Chevrolet	147	0	Running	0
19	30	3	Ty Dillon (i)	Richard Childress Racing	Chevrolet	147	0	Running	0
20	14	25	Brett Moffitt	AM Racing	Ford	147	0	Running	18
21	31	35	Patrick Emerling	Emerling-Gase Motorsports	Chevrolet	147	1	Running	16
22	28	07	Stefan Parsons	SS-Green Light Racing	Chevrolet	147	0	Running	15
23	35	6	Brennan Poole	JD Motorsports	Chevrolet	147	0	Running	14
24	8	31	Parker Retzlaff (R)	Jordan Anderson Racing	Chevrolet	147	0	Running	13
25	7	2	Sheldon Creed	Richard Childress Racing	Chevrolet	147	0	Running	16
26	33	45	Jeffrey Earnhardt	Alpha Prime Racing	Chevrolet	147	0	Running	11
27	16	39	Ryan Sieg	RSS Racing	Ford	146	0	Running	14
28	34	53	Matt Mills (i)	Emerling-Gase Motorsports	Ford	146	0	Running	0
29	36	08	Gray Gaulding	SS-Green Light Racing	Ford	146	1	Running	8
30	29	28	Kyle Sieg	RSS Racing	Ford	146	0	Running	7
31	22	44	Sage Karam	Alpha Prime Racing	Chevrolet	144	0	Running	6
32	37	38	Joe Graf Jr.	RSS Racing	Ford	140	0	Accident	5
33	32	43	Ryan Ellis	Alpha Prime Racing	Chevrolet	74	0	Accident	4
34	11	9	Brandon Jones	JR Motorsports	Chevrolet	68	0	Accident	6
35	2	19	Ryan Truex	Joe Gibbs Racing	Toyota	68	0	Accident	7
36	6	16	Chandler Smith (R)	Kaulig Racing	Chevrolet	67	0	Accident	1
37	38	02	Blaine Perkins	Our Motorsports	Chevrolet	35	0	Suspension	1
38	18	98	Riley Herbst	Stewart-Haas Racing	Ford	20	0	Accident	1
Official race results

== Standings after the race ==
Drivers' Championship standings

	Pos	Driver	Points
1	1	John Hunter Nemechek	424
1	2	Austin Hill	423 (-1)
2	3	Justin Allgaier	371 (–53)
	4	Josh Berry	367 (–57)
1	5	Cole Custer	365 (–59)
3	6	Chandler Smith	340 (–84)
	7	Sheldon Creed	330 (–94)
1	8	Sammy Smith	323 (–101)
1	9	Riley Herbst	313 (–111)
1	10	Sam Mayer	309 (–115)
1	11	Daniel Hemric	307 (–117)
2	12	Parker Kligerman	274 (–150)
Official driver's standings

- Note: Only the first 12 positions are included for the driver standings.

Previous race: 2023 A-GAME 200	NASCAR Xfinity Series; 2023 season	Next race: 2023 Alsco Uniforms 300 (Charlotte)
