= Cerro Pelon (disambiguation) =

Cerro Pelon is a large ranch estate in Santa Fe County, New Mexico where a number of movies have been filmed.

Cerro Pelon or Cerro Pelón (literally: Hairless Hill) may also refer to:

- Cerro Pelón, a community within the village of Zacazonapan, near Mexico City, Mexico
- Cerro Pelón, a mountain in Apaxco, Zumpango Region, Mexico

== See also ==
- Pilluni (disambiguation)
