= Chandler Smith =

American racing driver (born 2002)

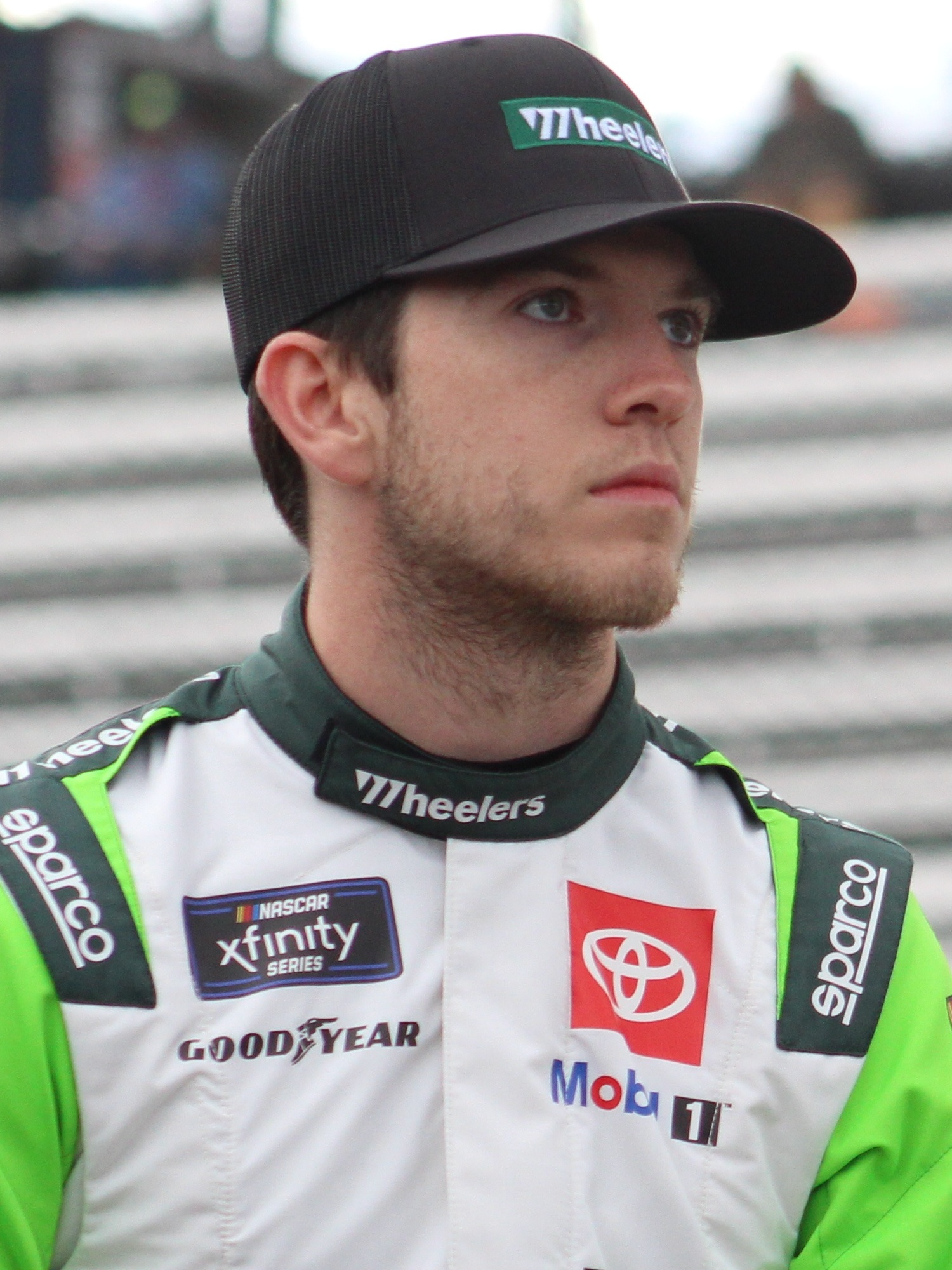
- Smith at Martinsville Speedway in 2024
- Born: Chandler Michael Smith; June 26, 2002 (age 24); Talking Rock, Georgia, U.S.
- Achievements: 2021 Snowball Derby Winner; 2018 SpeedFest 200 Winner; 2013 INEX Bandolero Bandit National Champion
- Awards: 2021 NASCAR Camping World Truck Series Rookie of the Year; 2017 Southern Super Series Rookie of the Year

NASCAR Cup Series career
- 3 races run over 1 year
- 2026 position: 57th
- Best finish: 47th (2023)
- First race: 2023 Toyota Owners 400 (Richmond)
- Last race: 2023 YellaWood 500 (Talladega)
Wins	Top tens	Poles
0	0	0

NASCAR O'Reilly Auto Parts Series career
- 71 races run over 4 years
- Car no., team: No. 21 (Richard Childress Racing)
- 2026 position: 85th
- Best finish: 5th (2024)
- First race: 2022 Ag-Pro 300 (Talladega)
- Last race: 2026 The LiUNA! (Las Vegas)
- First win: 2023 ToyotaCare 250 (Richmond)
- Last win: 2024 ToyotaCare 250 (Richmond)
Wins	Top tens	Poles
3	36	6

NASCAR FedEx Freight Truck Series career
- 111 races run over 7 years
- 2026 position: 3rd
- Best finish: 3rd (2022, 2026)
- First race: 2019 M&M's 200 (Iowa)
- Last race: 2026 Craftsman 200 (Homestead)
- First win: 2021 UNOH 200 (Bristol)
- Last win: 2026 Black's Tire 200 (Martinsville)
Wins	Top tens	Poles
10	66	1

NASCAR Canada Series career
- 1 race run over 1 year
- 2019 position: 46th
- Best finish: 46th (2019)
- First race: 2019 Total Quartz 200 (Mosport)
Wins	Top tens	Poles
0	0	0

ARCA Menards Series career
- 35 races run over 5 years
- Best finish: 10th (2020)
- First race: 2018 Music City 200 (Nashville Fairgrounds)
- Last race: 2022 Reese's 200 (IRP)
- First win: 2018 Herr's Potato Chips 200 (Madison)
- Last win: 2022 Reese's 200 (IRP)
Wins	Top tens	Poles
10	30	10

ARCA Menards Series East career
- 2 races run over 1 year
- Best finish: 28th (2020)
- First race: 2020 Royal Truck & Trailer 200 (Toledo)
- Last race: 2020 Bush's Beans 200 (Bristol)
Wins	Top tens	Poles
0	1	0
- Statistics up to date as of November 8, 2026.

Chandler Michael Smith Sr. (born June 26, 2002) is an American professional stock car racing driver. He competes full-time in the NASCAR O'Reilly Auto Parts Series driving the No. 21 Chevrolet Camaro SS for Richard Childress Racing.

Smith was a member of Toyota Racing Development's TD2 driver development system from 2018 until the end of 2022 but rejoined the program for 2024, before leaving at the end of the year again to rejoin the Truck Series.

== Racing career ==
=== Early career and ARCA Menards Series ===
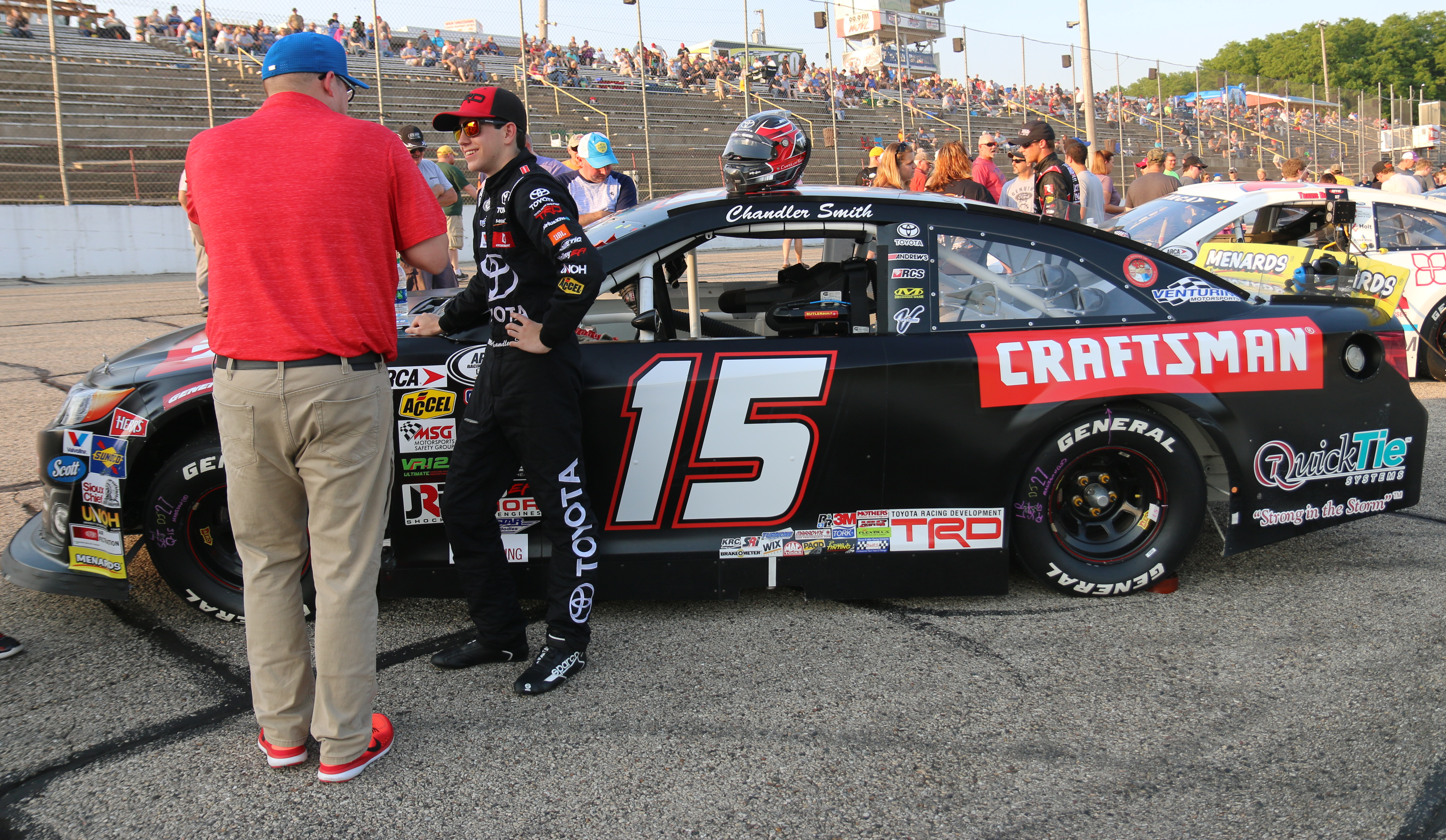
Smith next to his ARCA car before the race at Madison in 2018, which would be his first win in the series

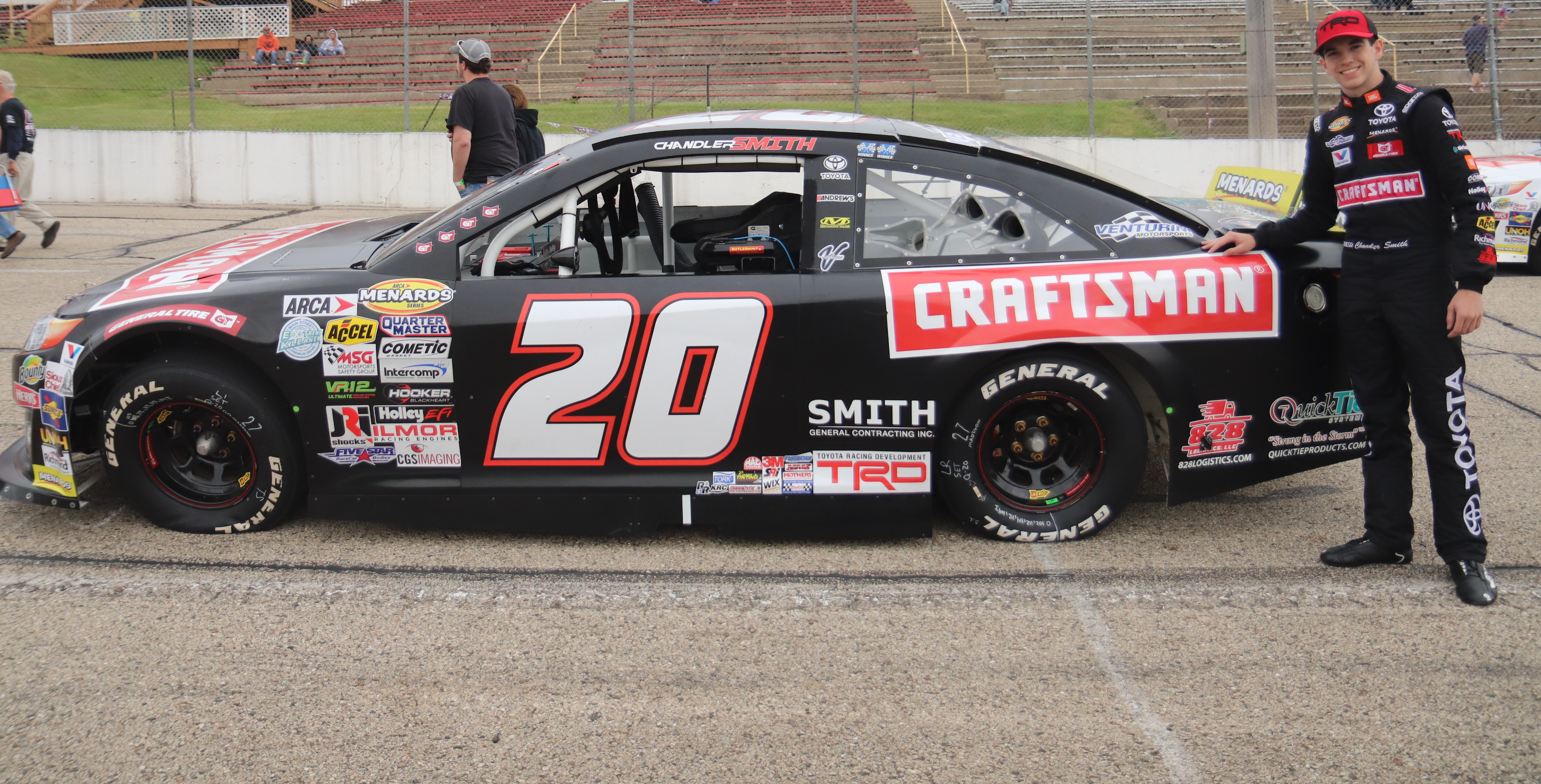
Smith beside his car before the Madison race in 2019, which he would also win

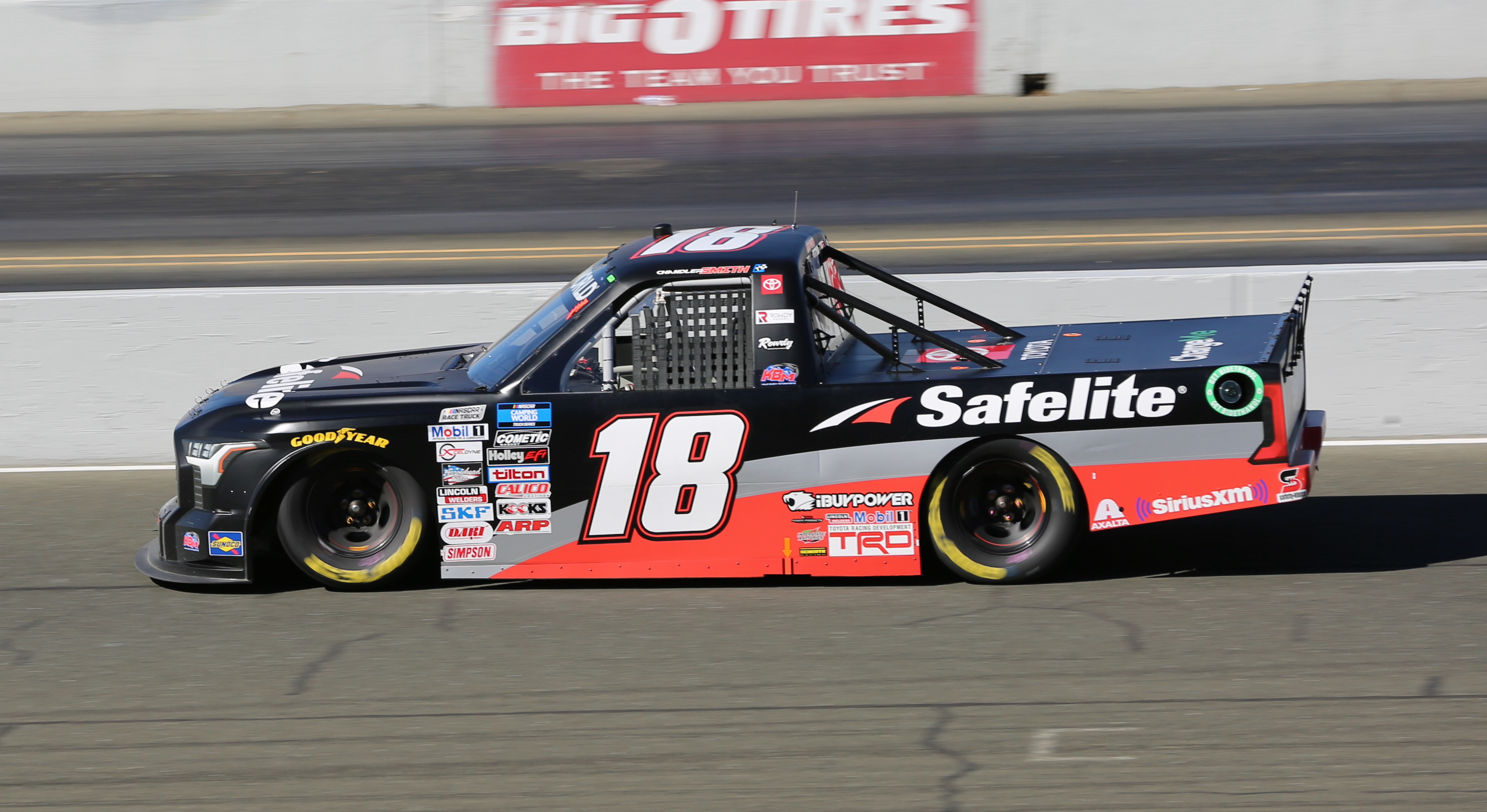
Smith's No. 18 truck at Sonoma Raceway in 2022

In 2013, Smith won the bandoleros national championship after two wins at Atlanta, one at Charlotte and one at Bethel Motor Speedway. In 2018, Smith made his ARCA Menards Series debut at the Nashville Fairgrounds Speedway and won the pole after qualifying was rained out. He led 51 laps and finished fifth in the race. In his fourth ARCA start, Smith dominated at Madison International Speedway and won his first race after leading the most laps.

On September 15, 2018, Smith dominated at Salem Speedway, leading nearly every lap to win his second race. On November 2, it was announced that Smith would return to Venturini Motorsports for the 2019 season for eleven races. Smith would run mostly short track events due to age restrictions.

Smith would return to Venturini part-time in the No. 20 for the third year in a row in 2020, with him in the car for thirteen races while Ryan Repko would join the team that year to drive it in most of the races at the larger tracks such as Daytona where Smith was not able to compete at due to being under eighteen. Ten of Smith's races that year were part of the brand new Sioux Chief Showdown, which put him in contention to win that separate championship within the ARCA Series.

=== Craftsman Truck Series ===
On February 21, 2019, Kyle Busch Motorsports announced that Smith would run a four-race NASCAR Gander Outdoors Truck Series schedule in the team's Nos. 46 and 51 Toyota Tundras. In just his first truck series start at Iowa, he would capture the pole after qualifying would be rained out with the starting order based on owner's points. Smith would lead the initial 55 laps and finished eighth in the race.

On March 3, 2020, Smith was announced to return to KBM part-time in the Truck Series for the 2020 season. His original schedule included eight races, all in the No. 51, which were at Richmond, Dover, Michigan, Gateway, Bristol, Las Vegas, Talladega, and the season finale at Phoenix. His schedule was shuffled due to the COVID-19 pandemic; at Texas in November, Smith spun and criticized Tanner Gray for the lack of an ability to drive straight; Smith was later blamed by Ben Rhodes for a last-lap incident, although Smith never publicly accepted blame.

Smith was promoted to a full-time Truck Series schedule for 2021, driving the No. 18 for KBM. He almost won the series' inaugural race at Knoxville, but lost the lead to Austin Hill in the closing laps and green-white-checkered attempts. Smith did barely qualify for the playoffs in the tenth and final spot despite being disqualified in the regular-season finale at Watkins Glen. At Bristol, in a must-win situation to make the Round of 8 in the playoffs, Smith won, beating Grant Enfinger and teammate John Hunter Nemechek as Nemechek overshot turn 1 and race leader Sheldon Creed was put into the wall by Smith and overshot turn 1 and spun finishing nineteenth. A 35th-place finish at Las Vegas and a nineteenth-place finish at Talladega cost Smith a chance at the Championship 4. Despite this, he won at Phoenix and finished eighth in the standings.

Smith began the 2022 season with a 21st-place finish at Daytona. He scored wins at Las Vegas and Pocono to make the playoffs. During the playoffs, he won at Richmond and stayed consistent enough to make the Championship 4. Smith finished third at Phoenix and third in the standings.

Smith returned to the Truck Series part-time in 2023, driving the No. 25 for Rackley W.A.R. at Talladega after Matt DiBenedetto parted ways with the team.

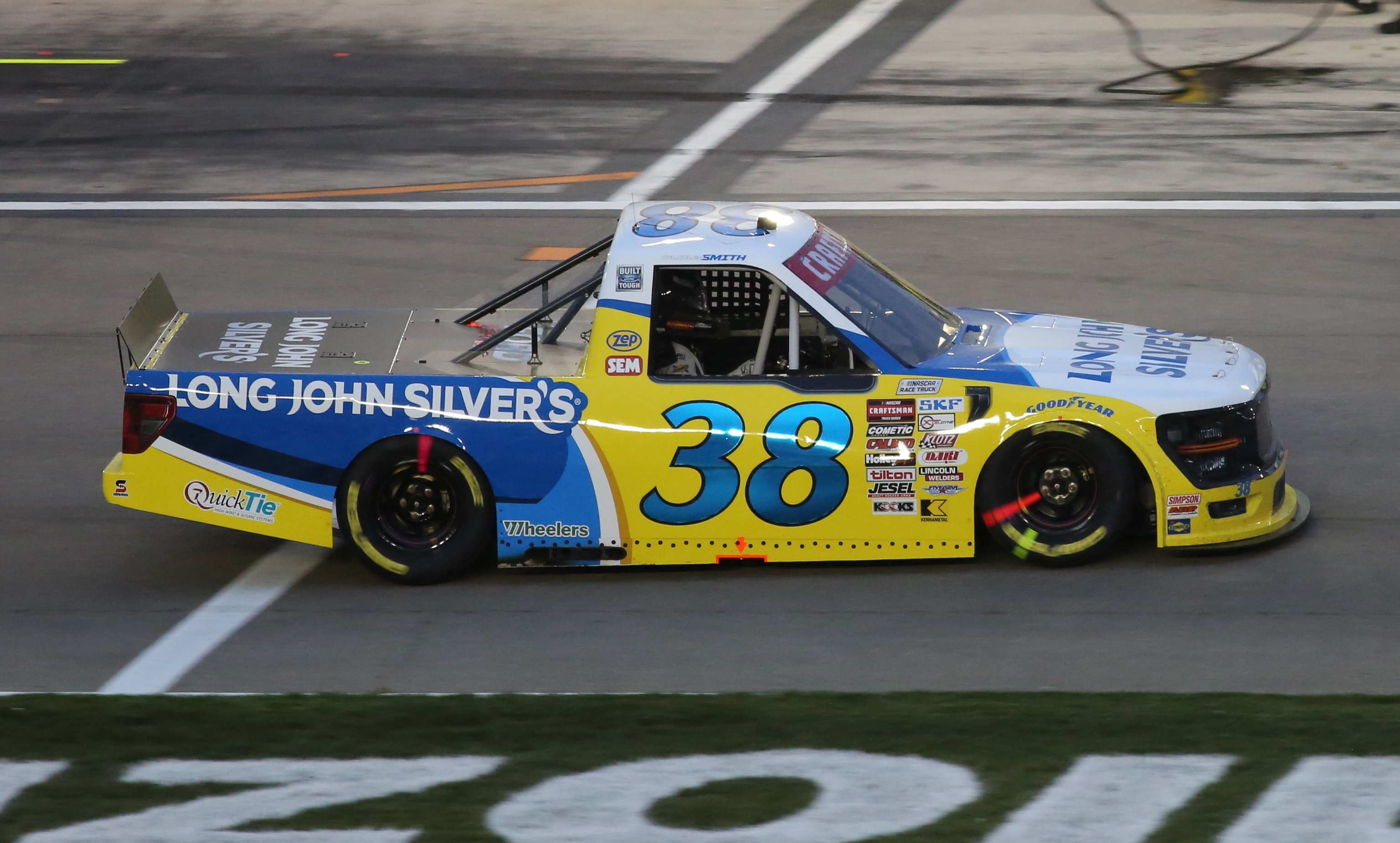
Smith's No. 38 truck at Las Vegas Motor Speedway in 2025

On December 20, 2024, Smith announced his return to the Truck Series full-time, driving for Front Row Motorsports in 2025. He would drive the No. 38 as Layne Riggs would move over to the No. 34 after FRM expanded to two full-time trucks. Smith started the season with a sixth-place finish at Daytona. He scored wins at Bristol and North Wilkesboro.

Smith started the 2026 season with a win at Daytona. Smith was the points leader until Rockingham, where he failed post race inspection. He also won at North Wilkesboro.

On July 28, 2026, Smith announced that he would not return to FRM in 2027.

=== O'Reilly Auto Parts Series ===
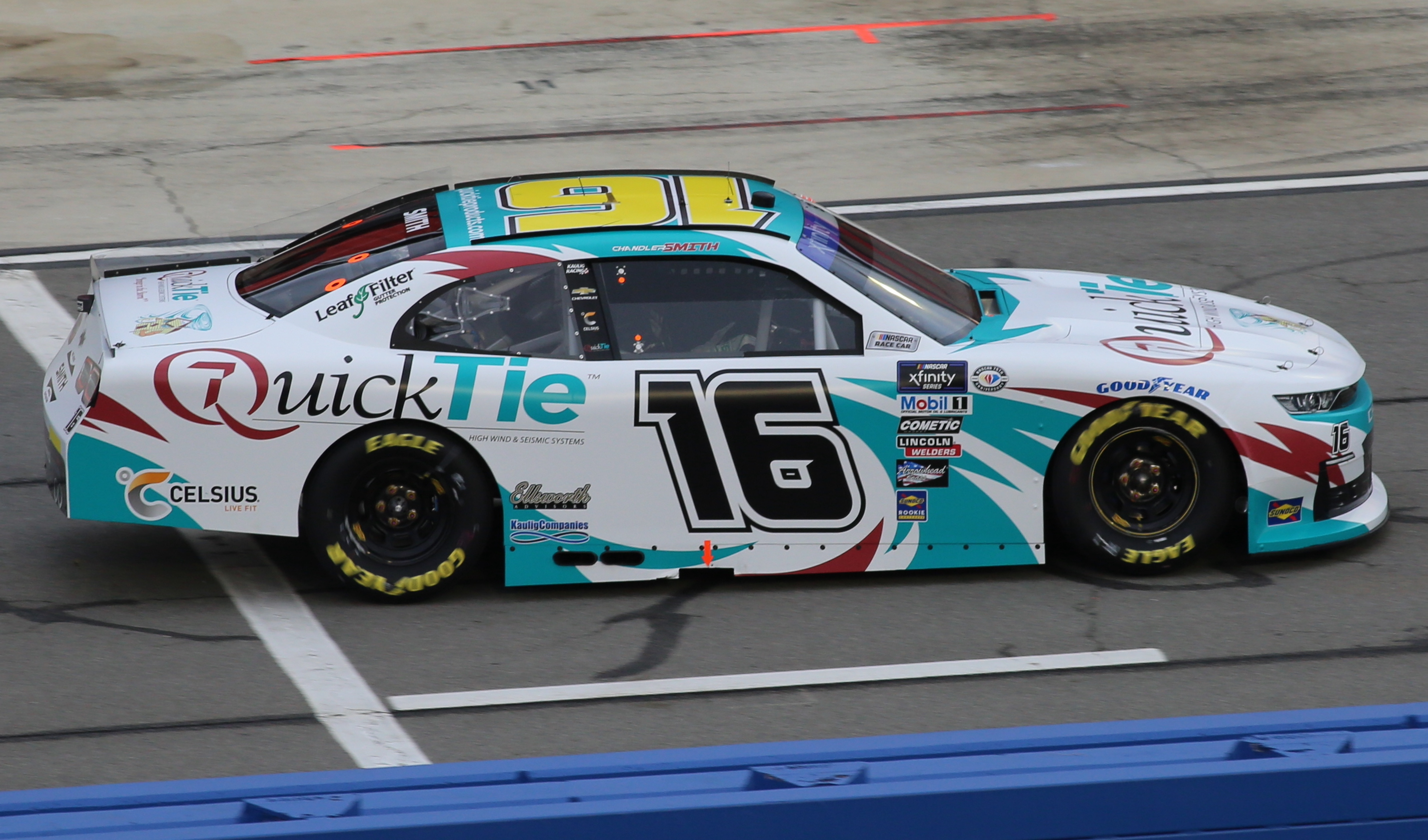
Smith at Auto Club Speedway in 2023

On October 5, 2022, Kaulig Racing announced that Smith would replace A. J. Allmendinger in the No. 16 in 2023 in the Xfinity Series, as Allmendinger would return to a full-time schedule in the Cup Series. Smith began the season with a twelfth place finish at Daytona. Two months later, he scored his first Xfinity win at Richmond. In October of that year, it was revealed that Smith, who originally signed a multi-year contract, would part ways with the team at the end of the season.

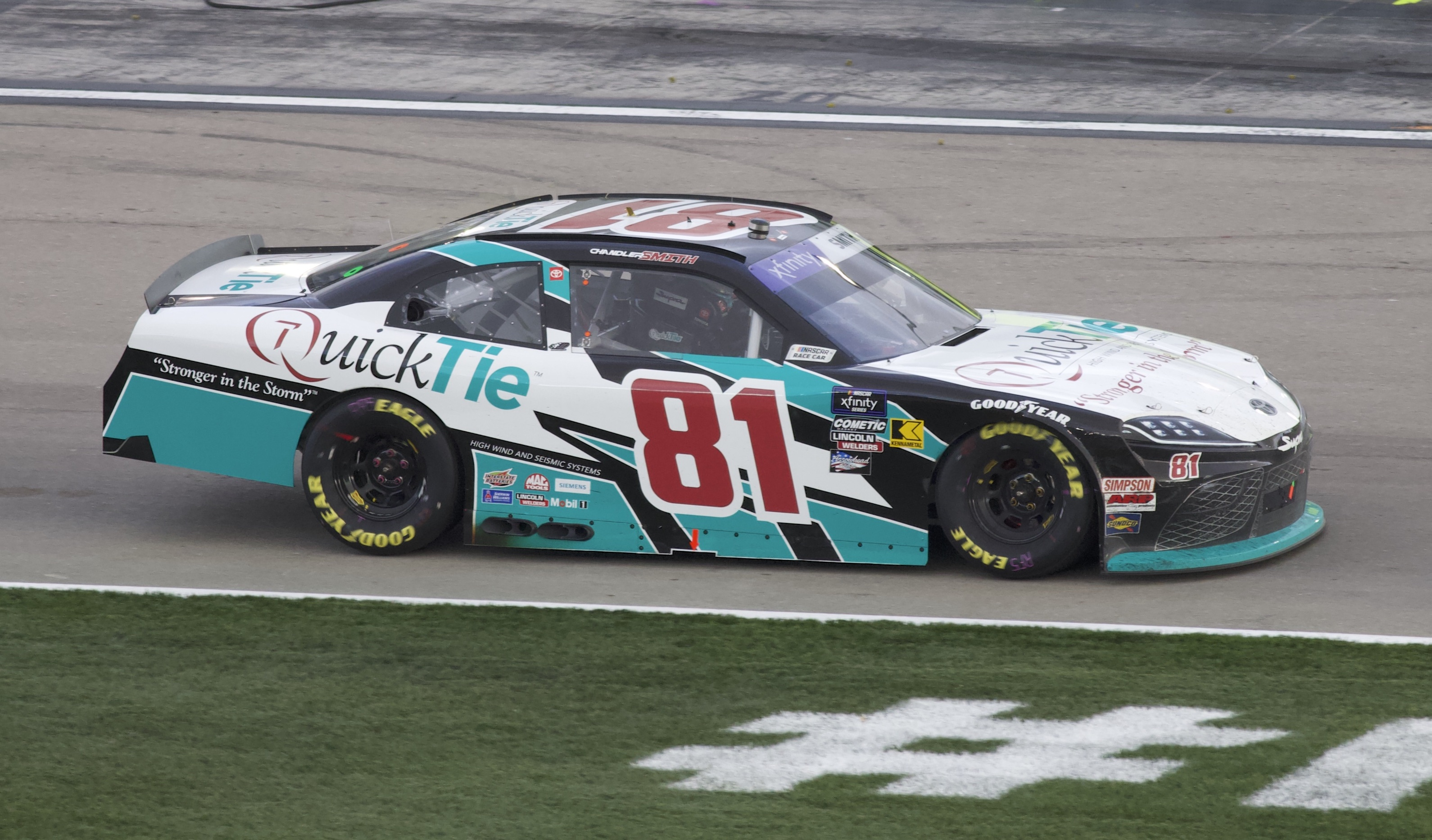
Smith's No. 81 car at Las Vegas Motor Speedway in 2024.

On December 13, 2023, it was announced that Smith will join Joe Gibbs Racing and drive the No. 81 Toyota full-time in 2024 after the team bought out Smith's contract from Kaulig. Smith started the season with a fifth place finish at Daytona. He later scored wins at Phoenix and Richmond. Smith was eliminated from the playoffs at the conclusion of the Round of 8 at Martinsville. In addition, he was fined US$10,000 for slapping Cole Custer in a post-race altercation. At the end of the season, Smith parted ways with JGR.

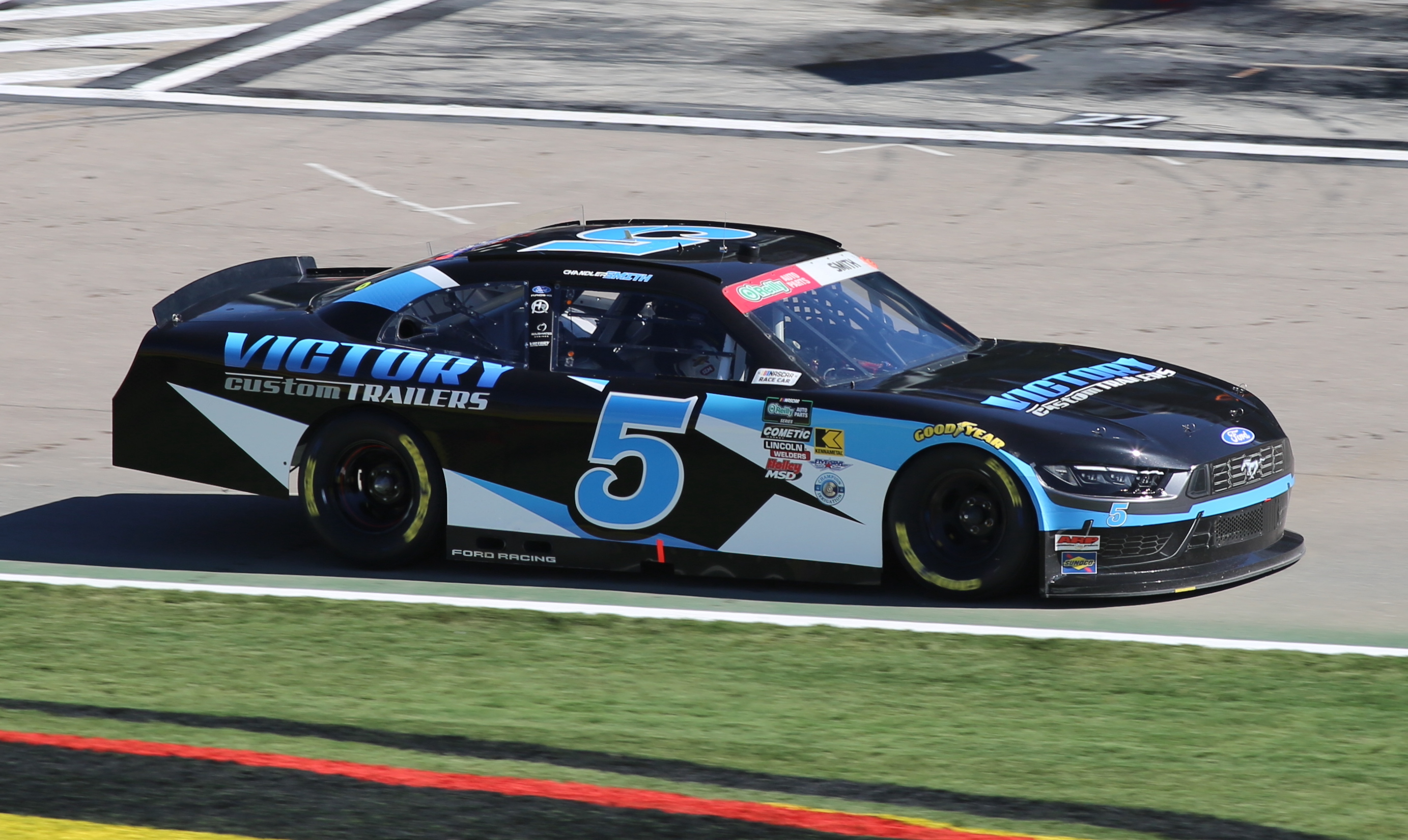
Smith's No. 5 car at Las Vegas Motor Speedway in 2026.

In 2026, Smith made two starts in the No. 5 Ford for Hettinger Racing.

On August 26, 2026, it was announced that Smith will drive full-time in the NASCAR O'Reilly Auto Parts Series for Richard Childress Racing in the No. 21 Chevrolet for the 2027 season.

=== Cup Series ===
On January 18, 2023, Kaulig Racing announced that Smith will attempt to make his Cup Series debut in the 2023 Daytona 500, with an additional four race schedule, driving a third car for the team. Smith failed to make the Daytona 500 after finishing eighteenth in Duel 1 of the 2023 Bluegreen Vacations Duels. Smith made his official Cup debut at Richmond, finishing seventeenth.

On January 22, 2025, MBM Motorsports announced that Smith would attempt to make the 2025 Daytona 500 in their Garage 66 Ford entry. He would fail to qualify after experiencing a hard crash in Duel 1 while running in third.

On January 22, 2026, it was announced that Smith would once again attempt to make the Daytona 500, this time driving the No. 36 Ford for Front Row Motorsports.

== Personal life ==
Smith attended Pickens High School in Jasper, Georgia and was a part of the graduating class of 2020. Smith's father, Mike Smith, is the owner of Smith General Contracting, a business that sponsors much of Chandler's racing endeavors.

Smith proposed to his girlfriend, Kenzie Grams, on New Year's Day in 2021; they were married on July 17, 2021. On February 4, 2022, they announced they were expecting their first child, and on August 4, 2022, their son, Chandler Smith Jr., was born. They announced on May 12, 2023, that they were expecting their second son.

== Motorsports career results ==
=== Racing career summary ===
Season	Series	Team	Races	Wins	Top 5	Top 10	Points	Position
2016	CARS Super Late Model Tour	Mike Smith	2	0	1	1	49	30th
2017	CARS Super Late Model Tour	Mike Smith	2	0	1	2	0	NC†
2018	CARS Super Late Model Tour	Mike Smith	3	0	3	3	93	11th
2018	ARCA Racing Series	Venturini Motorsports	9	2	6	8	1995	14th
2019	ARCA Menards Series	Venturini Motorsports	11	5	8	10	2420	11th
2019	NASCAR Pinty's Series	22 Racing	1	0	0	0	21	46th
2019	NASCAR Gander Outdoors Truck Series	Kyle Busch Motorsports	4	0	3	4	171	24th
2020	ARCA Menards Series East	Venturini Motorsports	2	0	1	1	64	28th
2020	ARCA Menards Series	Venturini Motorsports	13	2	8	10	506	10th
2020	CARS Super Late Model Tour	Kyle Busch Motorsports	2	0	2	2	31	19th
2020	NASCAR Gander Outdoors Truck Series	Kyle Busch Motorsports	12	0	5	5	312	19th
2021	CARS Super Late Model Tour	Donnie Wilson	3	1	3	3	65	9th
2021	ARCA Menards Series	Venturini Motorsports	1	0	0	0	33	90th
2021	NASCAR Camping World Truck Series	Kyle Busch Motorsports	22	2	6	9	2230	8th
2022	ARCA Menards Series	Venturini Motorsports	1	1	1	1	48	68th
2022	NASCAR Camping World Truck Series	Kyle Busch Motorsports	23	3	9	16	4034	**3rd**
2022	NASCAR Xfinity Series	Sam Hunt Racing	3	0	0	1	0	NC†
2023	ASA STARS National Tour	Ben Kennedy Racing	0	0	0	0	5	118th
2023	NASCAR Craftsman Truck Series	Rackley W. A. R.	1	0	1	1	0	NC†
2023	NASCAR Xfinity Series	Kaulig Racing	33	1	8	13	2219	9th
2023	NASCAR Cup Series	Kaulig Racing	3	0	0	0	0	NC†
2024	ASA STARS National Tour	Wilson Motorsports	1	1	1	1	95	29th
2024	NASCAR Xfinity Series	Joe Gibbs Racing	33	2	17	22	2314	5th
2025	NASCAR Craftsman Truck Series	Front Row Motorsports	25	2	5	16	2179	8th
2025	NASCAR Cup Series	Garage 66	0	0	0	0	0	NC†
2026	NASCAR Craftsman Truck Series	Front Row Motorsports	25	3	8	13	2340	**3rd**
2026	NASCAR Cup Series	Front Row Motorsports	0	0	0	0	0	NC†
2026	NASCAR O'Reilly Auto Parts Series	Hettinger Racing	2	0	0	0	0	NC†

=== NASCAR ===
(key) (Bold – Pole position awarded by qualifying time. Italics – Pole position earned by points standings or practice time. * – Most laps led.)

==== Cup Series ====
NASCAR Cup Series results
Year	Team	No.	Make	1	2	3	4	5	6	7	8	9	10	11	12	13	14	15	16	17	18	19	20	21	22	23	24	25	26	27	28	29	30	31	32	33	34	35	36	NCSC	Pts	Ref
2023	Kaulig Racing	13	Chevy	DAY; DNQ	CAL	LVS	PHO	ATL	COA	RCH; 17	BRD	MAR	TAL	DOV	KAN	DAR	CLT	GTW	SON	NSH	CSC	ATL	NHA	POC	RCH	MCH	IRC	GLN	DAY; 15	DAR	KAN	BRI	TEX	TAL; 11	ROV	LVS	HOM	MAR	PHO	47th	0^{1}	
2025	Garage 66	66	Ford	DAY; DNQ	ATL	COA	PHO	LVS	HOM	MAR	DAR	BRI	TAL	TEX	KAN	CLT	NSH	MCH	MXC	POC	ATL	CSC	SON	DOV	IND	IOW	GLN	RCH	DAY	DAR	GTW	BRI	NHA	KAN	ROV	LVS	TAL	MAR	PHO	60th	0^{1}	
2026	Front Row Motorsports	36	Ford	DAY; DNQ	ATL	COA	PHO	LVS	DAR	MAR	BRI	KAN	TAL	TEX	GLN	CLT	NSH	MCH	POC	COR	SON	CHI	ATL	NWS	IND	IOW	RCH	NHA	DAY	DAR	GTW	BRI	KAN	LVS	CLT	PHO	TAL	MAR	HOM	57th	0^{1}	

===== Daytona 500 =====
Year	Team	Manufacturer	Start	Finish
2023	Kaulig Racing	Chevrolet	DNQ	
2025	Garage 66	Ford	DNQ	
2026	Front Row Motorsports	Ford	DNQ	

==== O'Reilly Auto Parts Series ====
NASCAR O'Reilly Auto Parts Series results
Year	Team	No.	Make	1	2	3	4	5	6	7	8	9	10	11	12	13	14	15	16	17	18	19	20	21	22	23	24	25	26	27	28	29	30	31	32	33	NOAPSC	Pts	Ref
2022	Sam Hunt Racing	26	Toyota	DAY	CAL	LVS	PHO	ATL	COA	RCH	MAR	TAL; 38	DOV; 21	DAR	TEX	CLT	PIR	NSH	ROA	ATL	NHA	POC	IRC	MCH	GLN	DAY	DAR	KAN	BRI	TEX	TAL	ROV	LVS	HOM; 7	MAR	PHO	87th	0^{1}	
2023	Kaulig Racing	16	Chevy	DAY; 12	CAL; 4	**LVS**; 3*	PHO; 5	ATL; 28	COA; 12	RCH; 1*	MAR; 10	TAL; 25	DOV; 13	DAR; 36	CLT; 13	PIR; 9	SON; 14	NSH; 12*	CSC; 8	**ATL**; 20	**NHA**; 2	POC; 20	ROA; 37	MCH; 20	IRC; 34	GLN; 8	DAY; 22	DAR; 12	KAN; 32	BRI; 5	TEX; 4	ROV; 12	LVS; 4	HOM; 34	MAR; 36	PHO; 8	9th	2219	
2024	Joe Gibbs Racing	81	Toyota	DAY; 5	ATL; 2	LVS; 3	PHO; 1*	COA; 8	RCH; 1	MAR; 3	TEX; 15	TAL; 25	DOV; 7	DAR; 12	CLT; 18	PIR; 35	SON; 7	IOW; 8*	NHA; 15	NSH; 2	CSC; 38	POC; 15	IND; 33	MCH; 27	**DAY**; 2	DAR; 8	ATL; 4	GLN; 4	**BRI**; 3	KAN; 3*	TAL; 5	ROV; 5	LVS; 4	**HOM**; 13	MAR; 3	PHO; 5	5th	2314	
2026	Hettinger Racing	5	Ford	DAY	ATL	COA	PHO; 21	LVS; 36	DAR	MAR	CAR	BRI	KAN	TAL	TEX	GLN	DOV	CLT	NSH	POC	COR	SON	CHI	ATL	IND	IOW	DAY	DAR	GTW	BRI	LVS	CLT	PHO	TAL	MAR	HOM	85th	0^{1}	

==== Craftsman Truck Series ====
NASCAR Craftsman Truck Series results
Year	Team	No.	Make	1	2	3	4	5	6	7	8	9	10	11	12	13	14	15	16	17	18	19	20	21	22	23	24	25	NCTC	Pts	Ref
2019	Kyle Busch Motorsports	51	Toyota	DAY	ATL	LVS	MAR	TEX	DOV	KAN	CLT	TEX	IOW; 8							BRI; 2	MSP	LVS	TAL	MAR					24th	171	
2019	Kyle Busch Motorsports	46	Toyota											GTW; 4	CHI	KEN	POC	ELD	MCH						PHO; 3	HOM			24th	171	
2020	Kyle Busch Motorsports	51	Toyota	DAY	LVS	CLT	ATL	HOM	POC	KEN; 22	TEX	KAN	KAN	MCH; 38	DRC	DOV; 20	GTW; 23	DAR; 23	RCH; 12	BRI; 5	LVS; 5	TAL; 3	KAN; 5	TEX; 21	MAR	PHO; 3			19th	312	
2021	Kyle Busch Motorsports	18	Toyota	DAY; 9*	DRC; 12	LVS; 19	ATL; 35	BRD; 34	RCH; 4	KAN; 11	DAR; 27	COA; 33	CLT; 6	TEX; 5	NSH; 13*	POC; 25	KNX; 2*	GLN; 40	GTW; 28	DAR; 7	BRI; 1	LVS; 35	TAL; 19	MAR; 4	**PHO**; 1				8th	2230	
2022	Kyle Busch Motorsports	18	Toyota	DAY; 21	LVS; 1*	ATL; 4	COA; 5	MAR; 6	BRD; 19	DAR; 21	KAN; 4	TEX; 8	CLT; 8	GTW; 3	SON; 5	KNX; 13	NSH; 15	MOH; 6	POC; 1*	IRP; 18	RCH; 1*	KAN; 6	BRI; 9*	TAL; 14	HOM; 10	PHO; 3			3rd	4034	
2023	Rackley W.A.R.	25	Chevy	DAY	LVS	ATL	COA	TEX	BRD	MAR	KAN	DAR	NWS	CLT	GTW	NSH	MOH	POC	RCH	IRP	MLW	KAN	BRI	TAL; 4	HOM	PHO			92nd	0^{1}	
2025	Front Row Motorsports	38	Ford	DAY; 6*	ATL; 5	LVS; 8	HOM; 8	MAR; 4	BRI; 1*	CAR; 13	TEX; 16	KAN; 17	NWS; 1	CLT; 34	NSH; 7	MCH; 8	POC; 7	LRP; 6	IRP; 6	GLN; 23	RCH; 9	DAR; 30	BRI; 30	NHA; 2	ROV; 19	TAL; 22	MAR; 6	PHO; 8	8th	2179	
2026	Front Row Motorsports	38	Ford	DAY; 1	ATL; 6	STP; 4	DAR; 17	CAR; 36	BRI; 2	TEX; 10	GLN; 5	DOV; 12	CLT; 30	NSH; 3	MCH; 5	COR; 22	LRP; 30	NWS; 1*	IRP; 4	RCH; 7	NHA; 2	BRI; 24	KAN; 6	CLT; 5	PHO; 15	TAL; 14	MAR; 1	HOM; 7	3rd	2340	

^{*} Season still in progress
^{1} Ineligible for series points

==== Pinty's Series ====
NASCAR Pinty's Series results
Year	Team	No.	Make	1	2	3	4	5	6	7	8	9	10	11	12	13	NPSC	Pts	Ref
2019	22 Racing	26	Chevy	MSP	JUK	ACD	TOR	SAS	SAS	EIR	CTR	RIS	MSP; 23	ASE	NHA	JUK	46th	21	

=== ARCA Menards Series ===
(key) (Bold – Pole position awarded by qualifying time. Italics – Pole position earned by points standings or practice time. * – Most laps led.)

ARCA Menards Series results
Year	Team	No.	Make	1	2	3	4	5	6	7	8	9	10	11	12	13	14	15	16	17	18	19	20	AMSC	Pts	Ref
2018	Venturini Motorsports	20	Toyota	DAY	**NSH**; 5	**SLM**; 10*	TAL	**TOL**; 4*	CLT	POC	MCH				IOW; 2	ELK; 6*	POC	ISF	BLN; 7	DSF	SLM; 1*	IRP; 3	KAN	14th	1995	
2018	Venturini Motorsports	15	Toyota									**MAD**; 1*	GTW	CHI										14th	1995	
2019	Venturini Motorsports	20	Toyota	DAY	**FIF**; 4	SLM; 4	TAL	NSH; 3	TOL; 1*	CLT	POC	MCH	**MAD**; 1*	GTW; 16	CHI	ELK; 1*	**IOW**; 1*	POC; 8	ISF	DSF	SLM; 8	IRP; 1	KAN	11th	2420	
2020	Venturini Motorsports	20	Toyota	DAY	PHO; 1	TAL	POC; 2	**IRP**; 1*	KEN	IOW; 4	KAN	**TOL**; 11*	TOL; 2	MCH	DAY; 9	GTW; 2	L44; 8	TOL; 2	BRI; 23	WIN	MEM; 5	ISF	KAN; 13	10th	506	
2021	Venturini Motorsports	25	Toyota	DAY	PHO	TAL	KAN	TOL	CLT	MOH	POC; 12	ELK	BLN	IOW	WIN	GLN	MCH	ISF	MLW	DSF	BRI	SLM	KAN	90th	33	
2022	Venturini Motorsports	15	Toyota	DAY	PHO	TAL	KAN	CLT	IOW	BLN	ELK	MOH	POC	IRP; 1*	MCH	GLN	ISF	MLW	DSF	KAN	BRI	SLM	TOL	68th	48	

==== ARCA Menards Series East ====
ARCA Menards Series East results
Year	Team	No.	Make	1	2	3	4	5	6	AMSEC	Pts	Ref
2020	Venturini Motorsports	20	Toyota	NSM	TOL	DOV	TOL; 2	BRI; 23	FIF	28th	64	

=== CARS Super Late Model Tour ===
(key)

CARS Super Late Model Tour results
Year	Team	No.	Make	1	2	3	4	5	6	7	8	9	10	11	12	13	CSLMTC	Pts	Ref
2016	Mike Smith	26	N/A	SNM	ROU	HCY	TCM	GRE	ROU; 12	CON	MYB	HCY; 5	SNM				30th	49	
2017	Mike Smith	26S	Toyota	CON	DOM	DOM	HCY	HCY	BRI; 3								N/A	0	
2017	Mike Smith	26	Toyota							AND; 10	ROU	TCM	ROU	HCY	CON	SBO	N/A	0	
2018	Mike Smith	26C	Toyota	MYB; 2	NSH	ROU											11th	93	
2018	Mike Smith	26	Toyota				HCY; 2	BRI	AND								11th	93	
2018	Mike Smith	26S	Toyota							HCY; 2	ROU	SBO					11th	93	
2020	Kyle Busch Motorsports	51S	Toyota	SNM	HCY; 2	JEN	HCY	FCS	BRI	FLC							19th	31	
2020	N/A	26S	Toyota								NSH; 2						19th	31	
2021	Donnie Wilson	26	Toyota	HCY	GPS; 5	NSH	JEN										9th	65	
2021	Donnie Wilson	24	Toyota					HCY; 2	MMS								9th	65	
2021	N/A	26S	Toyota							TCM; 1	SBO						9th	65	

=== ASA STARS National Tour ===
(key) (Bold – Pole position awarded by qualifying time. Italics – Pole position earned by points standings or practice time. * – Most laps led. ** – All laps led.)

ASA STARS National Tour results
Year	Team	No.	Make	1	2	3	4	5	6	7	8	9	10	ASNTC	Pts	Ref
2023	Ben Kennedy Racing	26S	Chevy	FIF	MAD	NWS; DNQ	HCY	MLW	AND	WIR	TOL	WIN	NSV	118th	5	
2024	Wilson Motorsports	22	Toyota	NSM	FIF	HCY	MAD	MLW	AND	OWO; 1*	TOL	WIN	NSV	29th	95	

Sporting positions
Preceded by Ty Majeski	Snowball Derby Winner; 2021	Succeeded by Derek Thorn
Preceded by Harrison Burton	SpeedFest 200 Winner; 2018	Succeeded by Connor Okrzesik
