= Bethel Motor Speedway =

Oval race track in White Lake, New York

- Location: White Lake, Bethel, Sullivan County, New York City
- Coordinates: 41°42′30″N 74°50′12″W
- Owner: Bethel Speedway, LLC
- Operator: Bethel Speedway, LLC
- Broke ground: 1959
- Opened: 1960
- Former names: White Lake Speedway; Catskill Mountain Speedway; Sullivan County Speedway; Kauneonga Speedway

Oval
- Surface: Asphalt
- Length: 0.25 mi (.40 km)
- Turns: 4
- Banking: variable banking 2–10 degrees

Bethel Motor Speedway is a quarter-mile asphalt oval race track, located near the site of the original Woodstock Music Festival in White Lake, New York.

== History ==
The track was constructed in 1959, and opened for operations in 1960. It has existed under several names, including White Lake Speedway, Catskill Mountain Speedway, Sullivan County Speedway, and Kauneonga Speedway. The track closed in 2006 and remained idle through 2007. Fred Graf Racing, LLC, purchased the speedway, and it reopened under new ownership bearing the Bethel Motor Speedway name on August 9, 2008. Dave and Joanne Rocket, who promoted races at the speedway from 1998 until 2004, returned as promoters under the new owner. The speedway was resurfaced in November 2010, providing a new racing surface for the 2011 season. For the 2011 season, management of the speedway was assumed by Tracy Chirico, Business Operations Manager; and John Condit, Race Director.

For the second half of the 2012 season, to season's end 2016, the duties of Race Director would be assumed by George Van Arsdall, Jr., Head Technical Inspector 2003–04, and 2008–12, under the new title of Race Day CoOrdinator. The 2013 bandolero national champion Chandler Smith won at the track en route to his national championship.

During the 2015 season, the track began live PPV broadcasts, available through internet streaming.

During the off-season of 2016–17, the track received new management, as others moved on to new ventures. general manager would be assumed by Paul DeGracia, a member of the track advisory board since its inception in 2011, past racer/current car owner, and successful business owner. Promotion duties would be assumed by Michael Hager, a long-time racing enthusiast, and track staff member.

For the 2018 season-present, George Van Arsdall, Jr. returned under the role of general manager, working with most of the previous staff from his 2012–2016 tenure as race day co-ordinator. Promoting and marketing duties would be assumed by Peter "Crackers" Reynolds.

In 2019, the management team, consisting of George Van Arsdall-general manager, Peter Reynolds-track promoter, and Jeff Lefcourt-business owner, negotiated a NASCAR sanction. The speedway and all of its weekly divisions race under the NASCAR banner, with end of year contingencies as well as insurance benefits.

2020, The management team now included announcer and race car driver Andy Crane in the promoter role along with Van Arsdall and Lefcourt.

At the end of the 2021 season Dawn Roemer, a long time supporter, car owner, photographer, and pit steward for the speedway, was promoted to interim Director of Promotions and Marketing.

For 2022 a change up in management members would promote Roemer to Director of Promotions and Marketing, and move Brian Bauernfeind, a long time behind the scenes, supporter, sponsor, former racer and car owner, and grounds maintenance to the management team. Amongst new divisions brought to the track in the ChampKarts and Mini Van Enduros, Small Car Sundays became a new inexpensive way for fans to come check out the track on select Sunday afternoons for just $5 a head.

By 2024, the NASCAR banner was dropped by the speedway, operating as an “outlaw” track. September 29th, 2024 would mark the closing of the speedway for a hiatus, stemming from that point to present.

The speedway sat idle in 2025, after the annual permit was retained.

Things are in motion to obtain the 2026 permit, albeit, no weekly racing is planned to occur at the speedway in the near future. At present it will be a special event speedway, with the possibility of racing 1-3 races max for the 2026 season.

== Events ==
On a weekly basis, Bethel Motor Speedway hosts DIRT Sportsman cars on asphalt, Bethel Motor Speedway (BMS) Asphalt Modifieds, Pro Stocks, Street Stocks, and 4 Cylinder stock cars. INEX-sanctioned Legends and Bandoleros also run weekly. The speedway hosts a limited number of races for Vintage Dirt Modifieds and ATQMRA Midgets, Tobias Slingshots, among other divisions.

Special events include the annual LegendStock race, which has been a qualifier race for the INEX Legends Asphalt Nationals since 2010 – the trademark of the event is a three-foot tall guitar-shaped trophy; Catskill Clash – a special race event race generally held in mid-October, with extra distance races and increased purses for the competitors; NovemberFest Weekend – Two days of special event racing action generally held the first weekend of November and is the annual season finale.

Regular race shows take place on Saturday nights, with the season typically running from late April until the first weekend of November. Saturdays in April, October, and November, as well as all Sunday shows are afternoon shows.

== Notable alumni ==
- William Byron
- Christian Eckes
- Joe Graf Jr.
- Daniel Hemric
