= 2023 YellaWood 500 =

NASCAR Cup Series race

Race details
- Race 31 of 36 in the 2023 NASCAR Cup Series
- Date: October 1, 2023
- Location: Talladega Superspeedway in Lincoln, Alabama
- Course: Permanent racing facility
- Course length: 2.66 miles (4.28 km)
- Distance: 188 laps, 500.08 mi (804.8 km)
- Average speed: 160.097 miles per hour (257.651 km/h)

Pole position
Driver	Aric Almirola	Stewart-Haas Racing
- Time: 52.715

Most laps led
Driver	Joey Logano	Team Penske
- Laps: 48

Winner
No. 12	Ryan Blaney	Team Penske

Television in the United States
- Network: NBC
- Announcers: Rick Allen, Jeff Burton, Steve Letarte and Dale Earnhardt Jr.

Radio in the United States
- Radio: MRN
- Booth announcers: Alex Hayden, Jeff Striegle and Rusty Wallace
- Turn announcers: Dave Moody (1 & 2), Mike Bagley (Backstretch) and Kurt Becker (3 & 4)

The 2023 YellaWood 500 was a NASCAR Cup Series race held on October 1, 2023, at Talladega Superspeedway in Lincoln, Alabama. Contested over 188 laps on the 2.66 mi (4.28 km) asphalt superspeedway, it was the 31st race of the 2023 NASCAR Cup Series season, fifth race of the Playoffs, and second race of the Round of 12.

== Report ==
=== Background ===
Talladega Superspeedway, the track where the race was held.

Talladega Superspeedway, originally known as Alabama International Motor Superspeedway (AIMS), is a motorsports complex located north of Talladega, Alabama. It is located on the former Anniston Air Force Base in the small city of Lincoln. The track is a tri-oval and was constructed in the 1960s by the International Speedway Corporation, a business controlled by the France family. Talladega is most known for its steep banking and the unique location of the start/finish line that's located just past the exit to pit road. The track currently hosts the NASCAR series such as the NASCAR Cup Series, Xfinity Series and the Craftsman Truck Series. Talladega is the longest NASCAR oval with a length of 2.66-mile-long (4.28 km) tri-oval like the Daytona International Speedway, which also is a 2.5-mile-long (4 km) tri-oval.

==== Entry list ====
- (R) denotes rookie driver.
- (i) denotes driver who is ineligible for series driver points.
- (P) denotes playoff driver.
- (OP) denotes owner’s playoffs car.

No.	Driver	Team	Manufacturer
1	Ross Chastain (P)	Trackhouse Racing	Chevrolet
2	Austin Cindric	Team Penske	Ford
3	Austin Dillon	Richard Childress Racing	Chevrolet
4	Kevin Harvick	Stewart-Haas Racing	Ford
5	Kyle Larson (P)	Hendrick Motorsports	Chevrolet
6	Brad Keselowski (P)	RFK Racing	Ford
7	Corey LaJoie	Spire Motorsports	Chevrolet
8	Kyle Busch (P)	Richard Childress Racing	Chevrolet
9	Chase Elliott (OP)	Hendrick Motorsports	Chevrolet
10	Aric Almirola	Stewart-Haas Racing	Ford
11	Denny Hamlin (P)	Joe Gibbs Racing	Toyota
12	Ryan Blaney (P)	Team Penske	Ford
13	Chandler Smith (i)	Kaulig Racing	Chevrolet
14	Chase Briscoe	Stewart-Haas Racing	Ford
15	Brennan Poole (i)	Rick Ware Racing	Ford
16	A. J. Allmendinger	Kaulig Racing	Chevrolet
17	Chris Buescher (P)	RFK Racing	Ford
19	Martin Truex Jr. (P)	Joe Gibbs Racing	Toyota
20	Christopher Bell (P)	Joe Gibbs Racing	Toyota
21	Harrison Burton	Wood Brothers Racing	Ford
22	Joey Logano	Team Penske	Ford
23	Bubba Wallace (P)	23XI Racing	Toyota
24	William Byron (P)	Hendrick Motorsports	Chevrolet
31	Justin Haley	Kaulig Racing	Chevrolet
34	Michael McDowell	Front Row Motorsports	Ford
36	Riley Herbst (i)	Front Row Motorsports	Ford
38	Todd Gilliland	Front Row Motorsports	Ford
41	Ryan Preece	Stewart-Haas Racing	Ford
42	Carson Hocevar (i)	Legacy Motor Club	Chevrolet
43	Erik Jones	Legacy Motor Club	Chevrolet
45	Tyler Reddick (P)	23XI Racing	Toyota
47	Ricky Stenhouse Jr.	JTG Daugherty Racing	Chevrolet
48	Alex Bowman	Hendrick Motorsports	Chevrolet
51	J. J. Yeley (i)	Rick Ware Racing	Ford
54	Ty Gibbs (R)	Joe Gibbs Racing	Toyota
77	Ty Dillon	Spire Motorsports	Chevrolet
78	B. J. McLeod (i)	Live Fast Motorsports	Chevrolet
99	Daniel Suárez	Trackhouse Racing	Chevrolet
Official entry list

== Qualifying ==
Aric Almirola scored the pole for the race with a time of 52.715 and a speed of 181.656 mph (292.347 km/h).

=== Qualifying results ===
Pos	No.	Driver	Team	Manufacturer	R1	R2
1	10	Aric Almirola	Stewart-Haas Racing	Ford	52.944	52.715
2	22	Joey Logano	Team Penske	Ford	52.761	52.719
3	14	Chase Briscoe	Stewart-Haas Racing	Ford	52.949	52.724
4	5	Kyle Larson (P)	Hendrick Motorsports	Chevrolet	52.867	52.746
5	6	Brad Keselowski (P)	RFK Racing	Ford	52.951	52.757
6	36	Riley Herbst (i)	Front Row Motorsports	Ford	52.716	52.790
7	2	Austin Cindric	Team Penske	Ford	52.721	52.823
8	24	William Byron (P)	Hendrick Motorsports	Chevrolet	52.984	52.926
9	23	Bubba Wallace (P)	23XI Racing	Toyota	52.942	52.934
10	12	Ryan Blaney (P)	Team Penske	Ford	52.933	52.968
11	4	Kevin Harvick	Stewart-Haas Racing	Ford	52.992	—
12	11	Denny Hamlin (P)	Joe Gibbs Racing	Toyota	53.021	—
13	45	Tyler Reddick (P)	23XI Racing	Toyota	53.039	—
14	3	Austin Dillon	Richard Childress Racing	Chevrolet	53.048	—
15	20	Christopher Bell (P)	Joe Gibbs Racing	Toyota	53.052	—
16	19	Martin Truex Jr. (P)	Joe Gibbs Racing	Toyota	53.073	—
17	38	Todd Gilliland	Front Row Motorsports	Ford	53.085	—
18	34	Michael McDowell	Front Row Motorsports	Ford	53.100	—
19	41	Ryan Preece	Stewart-Haas Racing	Ford	53.105	—
20	48	Alex Bowman	Hendrick Motorsports	Chevrolet	53.121	—
21	21	Harrison Burton	Wood Brothers Racing	Ford	53.128	—
22	54	Ty Gibbs (R)	Joe Gibbs Racing	Toyota	53.129	—
23	9	Chase Elliott (OP)	Hendrick Motorsports	Chevrolet	53.142	—
24	17	Chris Buescher (P)	RFK Racing	Ford	53.143	—
25	8	Kyle Busch	Richard Childress Racing	Chevrolet	53.216	—
26	43	Erik Jones	Legacy Motor Club	Chevrolet	53.232	—
27	51	J. J. Yeley (i)	Rick Ware Racing	Ford	53.242	—
28	99	Daniel Suárez	Trackhouse Racing	Chevrolet	53.266	—
29	15	Brennan Poole (i)	Rick Ware Racing	Ford	53.281	—
30	31	Justin Haley	Kaulig Racing	Chevrolet	53.281	—
31	16	A. J. Allmendinger	Kaulig Racing	Chevrolet	53.341	—
32	1	Ross Chastain (P)	Trackhouse Racing	Chevrolet	53.365	—
33	77	Ty Dillon	Spire Motorsports	Chevrolet	53.449	—
34	13	Chandler Smith (i)	Kaulig Racing	Chevrolet	53.470	—
35	47	Ricky Stenhouse Jr.	JTG Daugherty Racing	Chevrolet	53.505	—
36	7	Corey LaJoie	Spire Motorsports	Chevrolet	53.731	—
37	78	B. J. McLeod (i)	Live Fast Motorsports	Chevrolet	53.841	—
38	42	Carson Hocevar (i)	Legacy Motor Club	Chevrolet	0.000	—
Official qualifying results

== Race ==
=== Race results ===
==== Stage results ====
Stage One Laps: 60

Pos	No	Driver	Team	Manufacturer	Points
1	12	Ryan Blaney (P)	Team Penske	Ford	10
2	24	William Byron (P)	Hendrick Motorsports	Chevrolet	9
3	5	Kyle Larson (P)	Hendrick Motorsports	Chevrolet	8
4	9	Chase Elliott (OP)	Hendrick Motorsports	Chevrolet	7
5	48	Alex Bowman	Hendrick Motorsports	Chevrolet	6
6	2	Austin Cindric	Team Penske	Ford	5
7	31	Justin Haley	Kaulig Racing	Chevrolet	4
8	22	Joey Logano	Team Penske	Ford	3
9	41	Ryan Preece	Stewart-Haas Racing	Ford	2
10	7	Corey LaJoie	Spire Motorsports	Chevrolet	1
Official stage one results

Stage Two Laps: 60

Pos	No	Driver	Team	Manufacturer	Points
1	6	Brad Keselowski (P)	RFK Racing	Ford	10
2	24	William Byron (P)	Hendrick Motorsports	Chevrolet	9
3	22	Joey Logano	Team Penske	Ford	8
4	3	Austin Dillon	Richard Childress Racing	Chevrolet	7
5	9	Chase Elliott (OP)	Hendrick Motorsports	Chevrolet	6
6	99	Daniel Suárez	Trackhouse Racing	Chevrolet	5
7	14	Chase Briscoe	Stewart-Haas Racing	Ford	4
8	5	Kyle Larson (P)	Hendrick Motorsports	Chevrolet	3
9	77	Ty Dillon	Spire Motorsports	Chevrolet	2
10	45	Tyler Reddick (P)	23XI Racing	Toyota	1
Official stage two results

=== Final Stage results ===
Stage Three Laps: 68

Pos	Grid	No	Driver	Team	Manufacturer	Laps	Points
1	10	12	Ryan Blaney (P)	Team Penske	Ford	188	50
2	8	24	William Byron (P)	Hendrick Motorsports	Chevrolet	188	53
3	12	11	Denny Hamlin (P)	Joe Gibbs Racing	Toyota	188	34
4	36	7	Corey LaJoie	Spire Motorsports	Chevrolet	188	34
5	7	2	Austin Cindric	Team Penske	Ford	188	37
6	30	31	Justin Haley	Kaulig Racing	Chevrolet	188	35
7	23	9	Chase Elliott (OP)	Hendrick Motorsports	Chevrolet	188	43
8	19	41	Ryan Preece	Stewart-Haas Racing	Ford	188	31
9	6	36	Riley Herbst (i)	Front Row Motorsports	Ford	188	0
10	28	99	Daniel Suárez	Trackhouse Racing	Chevrolet	188	32
11	34	13	Chandler Smith (i)	Kaulig Racing	Chevrolet	188	0
12	17	38	Todd Gilliland	Front Row Motorsports	Ford	188	25
13	3	14	Chase Briscoe	Stewart-Haas Racing	Ford	188	28
14	15	20	Christopher Bell (P)	Joe Gibbs Racing	Toyota	188	23
15	4	5	Kyle Larson (P)	Hendrick Motorsports	Chevrolet	188	33
16	13	45	Tyler Reddick (P)	23XI Racing	Toyota	188	22
17	1	10	Aric Almirola	Stewart-Haas Racing	Ford	188	20
18	16	19	Martin Truex Jr. (P)	Joe Gibbs Racing	Toyota	188	19
19	24	17	Chris Buescher (P)	RFK Racing	Ford	188	18
20	31	16	A. J. Allmendinger	Kaulig Racing	Chevrolet	188	17
21	18	34	Michael McDowell	Front Row Motorsports	Ford	188	16
22	35	47	Ricky Stenhouse Jr.	JTG Daugherty Racing	Chevrolet	188	15
23	9	23	Bubba Wallace (P)	23XI Racing	Toyota	188	14
24	2	22	Joey Logano	Team Penske	Ford	188	24
25	25	8	Kyle Busch (P)	Richard Childress Racing	Chevrolet	188	12
26	26	43	Erik Jones	Legacy Motor Club	Chevrolet	188	11
27	33	77	Ty Dillon	Spire Motorsports	Chevrolet	188	12
28	20	48	Alex Bowman	Hendrick Motorsports	Chevrolet	188	15
29	37	78	B. J. McLeod (i)	Live Fast Motorsports	Chevrolet	187	0
30	29	15	Brennan Poole (i)	Rick Ware Racing	Ford	186	0
31	21	21	Harrison Burton	Wood Brothers Racing	Ford	175	6
32	5	6	Brad Keselowski (P)	RFK Racing	Ford	161	15
33	14	3	Austin Dillon	Richard Childress Racing	Chevrolet	161	11
34	22	54	Ty Gibbs (R)	Joe Gibbs Racing	Toyota	161	3
35	38	42	Carson Hocevar (i)	Legacy Motor Club	Chevrolet	161	0
36	27	51	J. J. Yeley (i)	Rick Ware Racing	Ford	83	0
37	32	1	Ross Chastain (P)	Trackhouse Racing	Chevrolet	59	1
DSQ	11	4	Kevin Harvick (Note: Harvick originally finished second, but was disqualified after failing post-race inspection as it was discovered that his car's windshield fasteners was not securely installed.)	Stewart-Haas Racing	Ford	188	1
Official race results

=== Race statistics ===
- Lead changes: 70 among 24 different drivers
- Cautions/Laps: 4 for 19 laps
- Red flags: 1 for 9 minutes and 57 seconds
- Time of race: 3 hours, 7 minutes, and 25 seconds
- Average speed: 160.097 miles per hour (257.651 km/h)
- Margin of victory: 0.012 seconds

== Media ==
=== Television ===
NBC Sports covered the race on the television side. Rick Allen, Jeff Burton, Steve Letarte and six-time Talladega winner Dale Earnhardt Jr. called the race from the broadcast booth. Dave Burns, Kim Coon, Marty Snider, and Dillon Welch handled the pit road duties from pit lane.

NBC
Booth announcers	Pit reporters
Lap-by-lap: Rick Allen; Color-commentator: Jeff Burton; Color-commentator: Steve Letarte; Color-commentator: Dale Earnhardt Jr.	Dave Burns; Kim Coon; Marty Snider; Dillon Welch

=== Radio ===
MRN had the radio call for the race, which was also simulcasted on Sirius XM NASCAR Radio. Alex Hayden, Jeff Striegle and Rusty Wallace called the race for MRN when the field races thru the tri-oval. Dave Moody called the action from turn 1, Mike Bagley called the action for MRN when the field races down the backstraightaway, and Kurt Becker called the race from the Sunoco tower just outside of turn 4. Steve Post, Georgia Henneberry, Brienne Pedigo, and Jason Toy called the action for MRN from pit lane.

MRN
Booth announcers	Turn announcers	Pit reporters
Lead announcer: Alex Hayden; Announcer: Jeff Striegle; Announcer: Rusty Wallace	Turns 1 & 2: Dave Moody; Backstretch: Mike Bagley; Turns 3 & 4: Kurt Becker	Steve Post; Georgia Henneberry; Brienne Pedigo; Jason Toy

== Standings after the race ==
Drivers' Championship standings

	Pos	Driver	Points
	1	William Byron	3,136
	2	Denny Hamlin	3,108 (–28)
1	3	Christopher Bell	3,080 (–56)
7	4	Ryan Blaney	3,078 (–58)
2	5	Chris Buescher	3,077 (–59)
1	6	Martin Truex Jr.	3,075 (–61)
1	7	Kyle Larson	3,073 (–63)
1	8	Brad Keselowski	3,060 (–76)
1	9	Tyler Reddick	3,058 (–78)
1	10	Bubba Wallace	3,051 (–85)
5	11	Ross Chastain	3,050 (–86)
	12	Kyle Busch	3,034 (–102)
2	13	Joey Logano	2,111 (–1,025)
	14	Ricky Stenhouse Jr.	2,111 (–1,025)
1	15	Michael McDowell	2,103 (–1,033)
3	16	Kevin Harvick	2,103 (–1,033)
Official driver's standings

Manufacturers' Championship standings

Pos	Manufacturer	Points
1	Chevrolet	1,145
2	Toyota	1,076 (–69)
3	Ford	1,065 (–80)

- Note: Only the first 16 positions are included for the driver standings.

== Notes ==
Previous race: 2023 Autotrader EchoPark Automotive 400	NASCAR Cup Series; 2023 season	Next race: 2023 Bank of America Roval 400
