= 2023 Toyota Owners 400 =

NASCAR Cup Series race

Race details
- Race 7 of 36 in the 2023 NASCAR Cup Series
- Date: April 2, 2023
- Location: Richmond Raceway in Richmond, Virginia
- Course: Permanent racing facility
- Course length: 0.75 miles (1.2 km)
- Distance: 400 laps, 300 mi (480 km)
- Average speed: 91.085 miles per hour (146.587 km/h)

Pole position
Driver	Alex Bowman	Hendrick Motorsports
- Time: 3.050 (Pandemic Formula)

Most laps led
Driver	William Byron	Hendrick Motorsports
- Laps: 117

Winner
No. 5	Kyle Larson	Hendrick Motorsports

Television in the United States
- Network: FS1
- Announcers: Mike Joy, Clint Bowyer, and Larry McReynolds

Radio in the United States
- Radio: MRN
- Booth announcers: Alex Hayden, Jeff Striegle, and Rusty Wallace
- Turn announcers: Dave Moody (Backstretch)

The 2023 Toyota Owners 400 was a NASCAR Cup Series race held on April 2, 2023, at Richmond Raceway in Richmond, Virginia. Contested over 400 laps on the 0.75 mile (1.2 km) asphalt short track, it was the seventh race of the 2023 NASCAR Cup Series season.

== Report ==
=== Background ===
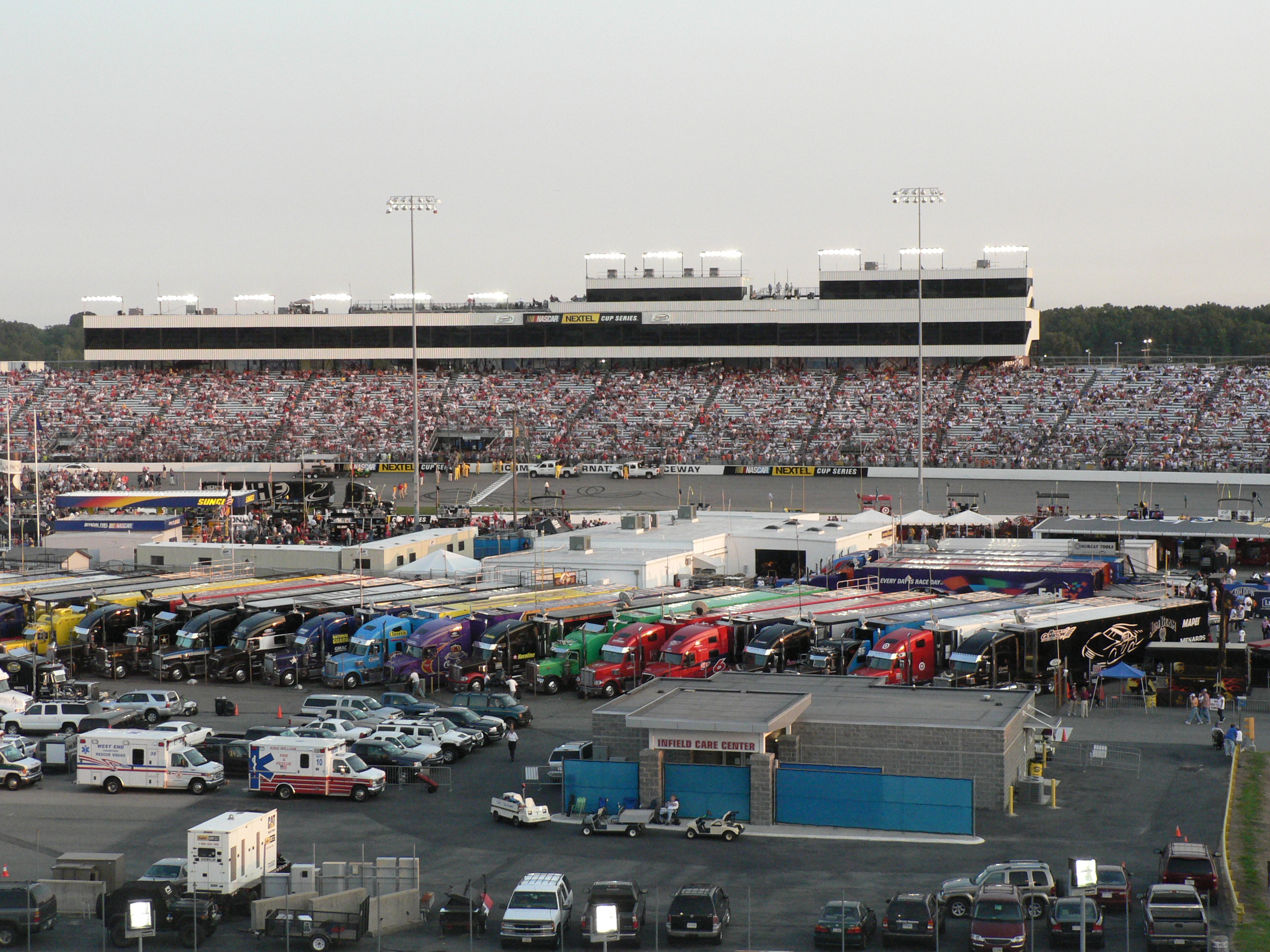
Richmond Raceway, the track where the race was held.

Richmond Raceway (RR) is a 0.75 miles (1.21 km), D-shaped, asphalt race track located just outside Richmond, Virginia in unincorporated Henrico County. It hosts the NASCAR Cup Series, NASCAR Xfinity Series and the NASCAR Craftsman Truck Series. Known as "America's premier short track", it has formerly hosted events such as the International Race of Champions, Denny Hamlin Short Track Showdown, and the USAC sprint car series. Due to Richmond Raceway's unique "D" shape which allows drivers to reach high speeds, Richmond has long been known as a short track that races like a superspeedway. With its multiple racing grooves, and proclivity for contact Richmond is a favorite among NASCAR drivers and fans.

==== Entry list ====
- (R) denotes rookie driver.
- (i) denotes driver who is ineligible for series driver points.

No.	Driver	Team	Manufacturer
1	Ross Chastain	Trackhouse Racing	Chevrolet
2	Austin Cindric	Team Penske	Ford
3	Austin Dillon	Richard Childress Racing	Chevrolet
4	Kevin Harvick	Stewart-Haas Racing	Ford
5	Kyle Larson	Hendrick Motorsports	Chevrolet
6	Brad Keselowski	RFK Racing	Ford
7	Corey LaJoie	Spire Motorsports	Chevrolet
8	Kyle Busch	Richard Childress Racing	Chevrolet
9	Josh Berry (i)	Hendrick Motorsports	Chevrolet
10	Aric Almirola	Stewart-Haas Racing	Ford
11	Denny Hamlin	Joe Gibbs Racing	Toyota
12	Ryan Blaney	Team Penske	Ford
13	Chandler Smith (i)	Kaulig Racing	Chevrolet
14	Chase Briscoe	Stewart-Haas Racing	Ford
15	J. J. Yeley	Rick Ware Racing	Ford
16	A. J. Allmendinger	Kaulig Racing	Chevrolet
17	Chris Buescher	RFK Racing	Ford
19	Martin Truex Jr.	Joe Gibbs Racing	Toyota
20	Christopher Bell	Joe Gibbs Racing	Toyota
21	Harrison Burton	Wood Brothers Racing	Ford
22	Joey Logano	Team Penske	Ford
23	Bubba Wallace	23XI Racing	Toyota
24	William Byron	Hendrick Motorsports	Chevrolet
31	Justin Haley	Kaulig Racing	Chevrolet
34	Michael McDowell	Front Row Motorsports	Ford
38	Todd Gilliland	Front Row Motorsports	Ford
41	Ryan Preece	Stewart-Haas Racing	Ford
42	Noah Gragson (R)	Legacy Motor Club	Chevrolet
43	Erik Jones	Legacy Motor Club	Chevrolet
45	Tyler Reddick	23XI Racing	Toyota
47	Ricky Stenhouse Jr.	JTG Daugherty Racing	Chevrolet
48	Alex Bowman	Hendrick Motorsports	Chevrolet
51	Cody Ware	Rick Ware Racing	Ford
54	Ty Gibbs (R)	Joe Gibbs Racing	Toyota
77	Ty Dillon	Spire Motorsports	Chevrolet
78	Anthony Alfredo (i)	Live Fast Motorsports	Chevrolet
99	Daniel Suárez	Trackhouse Racing	Chevrolet
Official entry list

== Practice ==
Practice was cancelled due to inclement weather.

== Qualifying ==
Qualifying was cancelled due to inclement weather. Alex Bowman was awarded the pole for the race as a result of NASCAR's pandemic formula with a score of 3.050.

=== Starting Lineup ===
Pos	No.	Driver	Team	Manufacturer
1	48	Alex Bowman	Hendrick Motorsports	Chevrolet
2	8	Kyle Busch	Richard Childress Racing	Chevrolet
3	24	William Byron	Hendrick Motorsports	Chevrolet
4	1	Ross Chastain	Trackhouse Racing	Chevrolet
5	45	Tyler Reddick	23XI Racing	Toyota
6	2	Austin Cindric	Team Penske	Ford
7	17	Chris Buescher	RFK Racing	Ford
8	47	Ricky Stenhouse Jr.	JTG Daugherty Racing	Chevrolet
9	5	Kyle Larson	Hendrick Motorsports	Chevrolet
10	4	Kevin Harvick	Stewart-Haas Racing	Ford
11	11	Denny Hamlin	Joe Gibbs Racing	Toyota
12	19	Martin Truex Jr.	Joe Gibbs Racing	Toyota
13	38	Todd Gilliland	Front Row Motorsports	Ford
14	54	Ty Gibbs (R)	Joe Gibbs Racing	Toyota
15	34	Michael McDowell	Front Row Motorsports	Ford
16	7	Corey LaJoie	Spire Motorsports	Chevrolet
17	12	Ryan Blaney	Team Penske	Ford
18	22	Joey Logano	Team Penske	Ford
19	14	Chase Briscoe	Stewart-Haas Racing	Ford
20	99	Daniel Suárez	Trackhouse Racing	Chevrolet
21	20	Christopher Bell	Joe Gibbs Racing	Toyota
22	43	Erik Jones	Legacy Motor Club	Chevrolet
23	42	Noah Gragson (R)	Legacy Motor Club	Chevrolet
24	6	Brad Keselowski	RFK Racing	Ford
25	16	A. J. Allmendinger	Kaulig Racing	Chevrolet
26	21	Harrison Burton	Wood Brothers Racing	Ford
27	3	Austin Dillon	Richard Childress Racing	Chevrolet
28	23	Bubba Wallace	23XI Racing	Toyota
29	31	Justin Haley	Kaulig Racing	Chevrolet
30	9	Josh Berry (i)	Hendrick Motorsports	Chevrolet
31	51	Cody Ware	Rick Ware Racing	Ford
32	41	Ryan Preece	Stewart-Haas Racing	Ford
33	10	Aric Almirola	Stewart-Haas Racing	Ford
34	15	J. J. Yeley	Rick Ware Racing	Ford
35	78	Anthony Alfredo (i)	Live Fast Motorsports	Chevrolet
36	77	Ty Dillon	Spire Motorsports	Chevrolet
37	13	Chandler Smith (i)	Kaulig Racing	Chevrolet
Official starting lineup

== Race ==
=== Race results ===
==== Stage Results ====
Stage One Laps: 70

Pos	No	Driver	Team	Manufacturer	Points
1	24	William Byron	Hendrick Motorsports	Chevrolet	10
2	5	Kyle Larson	Hendrick Motorsports	Chevrolet	9
3	1	Ross Chastain	Trackhouse Racing	Chevrolet	8
4	4	Kevin Harvick	Stewart-Haas Racing	Ford	7
5	22	Joey Logano	Team Penske	Ford	6
6	45	Tyler Reddick	23XI Racing	Toyota	5
7	48	Alex Bowman	Hendrick Motorsports	Chevrolet	4
8	20	Christopher Bell	Joe Gibbs Racing	Toyota	3
9	6	Brad Keselowski	RFK Racing	Ford	2
10	14	Chase Briscoe	Stewart-Haas Racing	Ford	1
Official stage one results

Stage Two Laps: 160

Pos	No	Driver	Team	Manufacturer	Points
1	11	Denny Hamlin	Joe Gibbs Racing	Toyota	10
2	20	Christopher Bell	Joe Gibbs Racing	Toyota	9
3	24	William Byron	Hendrick Motorsports	Chevrolet	8
4	19	Martin Truex Jr.	Joe Gibbs Racing	Toyota	7
5	1	Ross Chastain	Trackhouse Racing	Chevrolet	6
6	6	Brad Keselowski	RFK Racing	Ford	5
7	48	Alex Bowman	Hendrick Motorsports	Chevrolet	4
8	5	Kyle Larson	Hendrick Motorsports	Chevrolet	3
9	4	Kevin Harvick	Stewart-Haas Racing	Ford	2
10	54	Ty Gibbs (R)	Joe Gibbs Racing	Toyota	1
Official stage two results

=== Final Stage Results ===
Stage Three Laps: 170

Pos	Grid	No	Driver	Team	Manufacturer	Laps	Points
1	9	5	Kyle Larson	Hendrick Motorsports	Chevrolet	400	52
2	30	9	Josh Berry (i)	Hendrick Motorsports	Chevrolet	400	0
3	4	1	Ross Chastain	Trackhouse Racing	Chevrolet	400	48
4	21	20	Christopher Bell	Joe Gibbs Racing	Toyota	400	45
5	10	4	Kevin Harvick	Stewart-Haas Racing	Ford	400	41
6	15	34	Michael McDowell	Front Row Motorsports	Ford	400	31
7	18	22	Joey Logano	Team Penske	Ford	400	36
8	1	48	Alex Bowman (Note: Alex Bowman and William Byron were docked 60 points after NASCAR discovered irregularities in their cars' greenhouse during the R&D Center inspection.)	Hendrick Motorsports	Chevrolet	400	-23
9	14	54	Ty Gibbs (R)	Joe Gibbs Racing	Toyota	400	29
10	24	6	Brad Keselowski	RFK Racing	Ford	400	34
11	12	19	Martin Truex Jr.	Joe Gibbs Racing	Toyota	400	33
12	19	14	Chase Briscoe	Stewart-Haas Racing	Ford	400	26
13	33	10	Aric Almirola	Stewart-Haas Racing	Ford	400	24
14	2	8	Kyle Busch	Richard Childress Racing	Chevrolet	400	23
15	13	38	Todd Gilliland	Front Row Motorsports	Ford	400	22
16	5	45	Tyler Reddick	23XI Racing	Toyota	400	26
17	37	13	Chandler Smith (i)	Kaulig Racing	Chevrolet	400	0
18	32	41	Ryan Preece	Stewart-Haas Racing	Ford	400	19
19	26	21	Harrison Burton	Wood Brothers Racing	Ford	400	18
20	11	11	Denny Hamlin	Joe Gibbs Racinfg	Toyota	400	27
21	16	7	Corey LaJoie	Spire Motorsports	Chevrolet	400	16
22	28	23	Bubba Wallace	23XI Racing	Toyota	400	15
23	20	99	Daniel Suárez	Trackhouse Racing	Chevrolet	400	14
24	3	24	William Byron	Hendrick Motorsports	Chevrolet	400	-29
25	27	3	Austin Dillon	Richard Childress Racing	Chevrolet	399	12
26	17	12	Ryan Blaney	Team Penske	Ford	399	11
27	25	16	A. J. Allmendinger	Kaulig Racing	Chevrolet	399	10
28	6	2	Austin Cindric	Team Penske	Ford	399	9
29	29	31	Justin Haley	Kaulig Racing	Chevrolet	399	8
30	7	17	Chris Buescher	RFK Racing	Ford	398	7
31	22	43	Erik Jones	Legacy Motor Club	Chevrolet	398	6
32	36	77	Ty Dillon	Spire Motorsports	Chevrolet	398	5
33	35	78	Anthony Alfredo (i)	Live Fast Motorsports	Chevrolet	396	0
34	31	51	Cody Ware	Rick Ware Racing	Ford	395	3
35	8	47	Ricky Stenhouse Jr.	JTG Daugherty Racing	Chevrolet	384	2
36	34	15	J. J. Yeley	Rick Ware Racing	Ford	383	1
37	23	42	Noah Gragson (R)	Legacy Motor Club	Chevrolet	303	1
Official race results

=== Race statistics ===
- Lead changes: 22 among 11 different drivers
- Cautions/Laps: 8 for 54 laps
- Red flags: 0
- Time of race: 3 hours, 17 minutes and 37 seconds
- Average speed: 91.085 miles per hour (146.587 km/h)

== Media ==
=== Television ===
Fox Sports covered their 22nd race at the Richmond Raceway. Mike Joy, two-time Richmond winner Clint Bowyer, and Larry McReynolds called the race from the broadcast booth. Jamie Little and Regan Smith handled pit road for the television side.

FS1
Booth announcers	Pit reporters
Lap-by-lap: Mike Joy; Color-commentator: Clint Bowyer; Color-commentator: Larry McReynolds	Jamie Little; Regan Smith

=== Radio ===
MRN had the radio call for the race which was also simulcasted on Sirius XM NASCAR Radio. Alex Hayden, Jeff Striegle and 1989 NASCAR Winston Cup Champion Rusty Wallace called the race in the booth when the field raced down the frontstretch. Mike Bagley called the race from a platform inside the backstretch when the field raced down the backstretch. Steve Post, Jason Toy, and Brienne Pedigo handled pit road for the radio side.

MRN
Booth announcers	Turn announcers	Pit reporters
Lead announcer: Alex Hayden; Announcer: Jeff Striegle; Announcer: Rusty Wallace	Backstretch: Mike Bagley	Steve Post; Jason Toy; Brienne Pedigo

== Standings after the race ==
Drivers' Championship standings

	Pos	Driver	Points
	1	Alex Bowman	263
	2	Ross Chastain	259 (–4)
4	3	Christopher Bell	229 (–34)
1	4	William Byron	228 (–35)
1	5	Kevin Harvick	227 (–36)
3	6	Kyle Larson	222 (–41)
2	7	Joey Logano	222 (–41)
4	8	Kyle Busch	215 (–48)
2	9	Martin Truex Jr.	198 (–65)
2	10	Brad Keselowski	196 (–67)
3	11	Ryan Blaney	188 (–75)
2	12	Denny Hamlin	188 (–75)
	13	Tyler Reddick	187 (–76)
4	14	Austin Cindric	175 (–88)
1	15	Chris Buescher	164 (–99)
1	16	Ricky Stenhouse Jr.	161 (–102)
Official driver's standings

Manufacturers' Championship standings

Pos	Manufacturer	Points
1	Chevrolet	268
2	Toyota	239 (–29)
3	Ford	236 (–32)

- Note: Only the first 16 positions are included for the driver standings.

== Notes ==
Previous race: 2023 EchoPark Automotive Grand Prix	NASCAR Cup Series; 2023 season	Next race: 2023 Food City Dirt Race
