= Bandolero racing =

Entry level auto racing

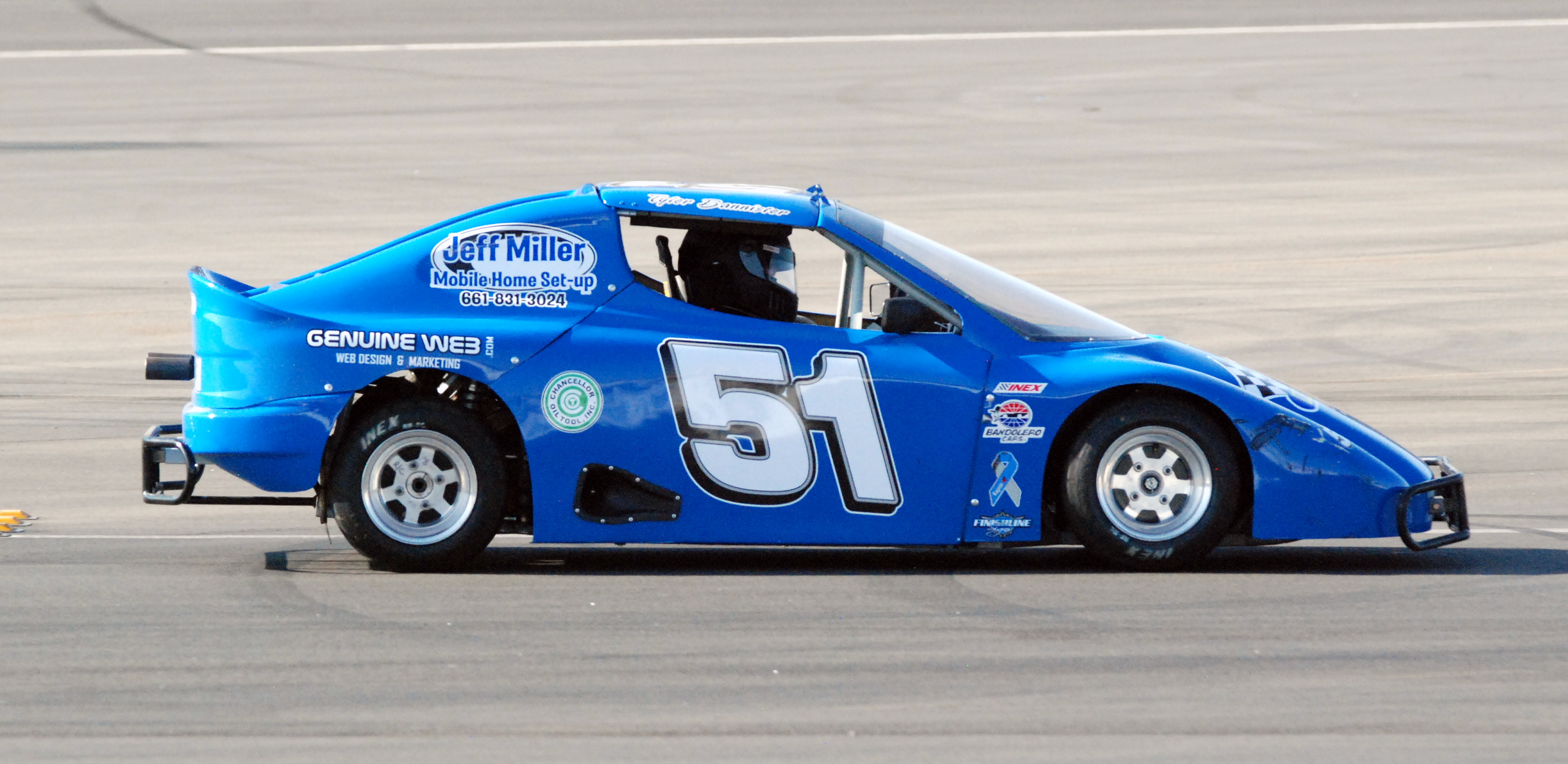
Bandolero race car

Bandolero car racing is a type of entry-level racing in the United States and Canada. The cars are built like miniature stock cars, with a tube frame and sheet metal cage. Drivers enter through the roof of the vehicle. Cars can reach in excess of 70 mph, but do not accelerate very quickly. Most drivers range from 8 to 14 years old, but older drivers can also race. The cars race on 1/4 mile, 3/8 mile and 4/10 mile ovals and also road courses and dirt tracks.

Many bandolero car drivers move into Legends racing. The most wins in Bandolero race cars used to be held by Joey Logano but was broken in 2016 by Clay Thompson, Chandler Smith also tied the record in 2014 but never broke it.

== History ==
Bandolero cars were introduced by US Legends Cars (formerly 600 Racing, Inc.), the makers of legends cars, in 1997 to be a series of entry-level cars. The Bandolero car is a turnkey, spec-series racer designed for drivers as young as eight years old. The term bandolero is Spanish for 'bandit', 'outlaw', or 'thief'.

"We wanted something to go between a kart and a car and wanted to make it relatively simple for everybody to use," said US Legends Cars founder H.A. "Humpy" Wheeler. "For example, like a kart, the Bandolero Car has left-foot braking and a centrifugal clutch so there's no shifting of gears for a new driver to worry about. Simplicity and economy of design are evident everywhere, with 150 parts making up the entire package–just half of what goes into making a Legends Car."

The Bandolero car engine is a Briggs & Stratton 570 cc Vanguard V-twin mounted behind the driver. Small modifications have been made to the engine to bring a 20 horsepower stock engine up to nearly 30 horsepower.

== Specifications ==
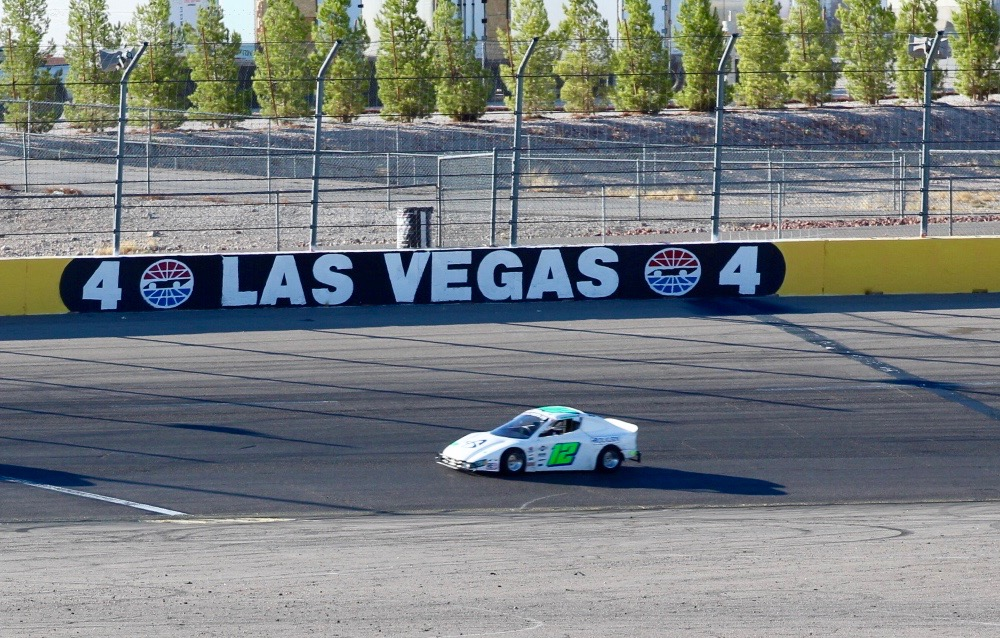
Bandolero car

- wheelbase: 70"
- overall width: 47 in
- overall length: 10 ft 9 in
- height: 34 in
- engine: Briggs & Stratton Vanguard (sealed)
- displacement: 570 cc
- horsepower: comes with 30 horsepower
- weight: 750 pounds
- tires: 7 X 12 in BF Goodrich tires spec racing
- wheels: 6 in spec racing wheel
- suspension: coil over shocks
- frame: full tubeframe with rollcage

== Alumni ==
Video of Derek Kraus winning a Bandolero race in 2013

Racers who have raced bandoleros include NASCAR racers Ryan Blaney, Bubba Wallace, Chris Buescher, Derek Kraus, Joey Logano, Brennan Poole, David Ragan, and Reed Sorenson. Chandler Smith was the 2013 national champion (United States).
