= Pilluni =

Pilluni (Aymara, hispanicized spellings Pelloni, Pillone, Pillune, Pilloni) may refer to:

- Pilluni (Apurímac-Cusco), a mountain on the border of the Apurímac Region and the Cusco Region, Peru
- Pilluni (Castilla), a mountain in the Castilla Province, Arequipa Region, Peru
- Pilluni (La Unión), a mountain in the La Unión Province, Arequipa Region, Peru

== See also ==
- Beatrice Pelloni (born 1962), Italian mathematician
