= Pelon Pelo Rico =

Tamarind-flavored candy

Pelón Pelo Rico
- Type: Candy
- Inventor: Grupo Lorena
- Inception: 1985
- Manufacturer: Lorena (subsidiary of The Hershey Company)
- Available: Available
- Current supplier: The Hershey Company
- Website: hersheycompany.com/pelon

Pelón Pelo Rico is a popular tamarind-flavored candy that is manufactured in Jalisco, Mexico, under the Lorena brand, by the Hershey Company, which is headquartered in Pennsylvania in the United States. The product originated in Guadalajara. Pelón Pelo Rico was created by the candy maker Grupo Lorena and released to the market in 1985. In 2004 the Hershey Company bought Lorena and its brands.

== History and notable product features ==
The candy's name loosely translates in English to "Yummy Hair Baldie," because the candy is squeezed out of a tube through a grate, producing a Medusa-like effect.

Its flavors include regular, sour lime, watermelon, and extra spicy. Ingredients include sugar, water, glucose, chili powder, citric acid, xanthan gum, and tamarind extract.

Pelón Pelo Rico is inexpensive, being sold for approximately US$0.50 at corner stores, and is commonly found in Mexican-owned stores and markets.

== Popular culture ==
In 2005, NASCAR driver Kevin Harvick ran a Pelón Pelo Rico car in the Telcel-Motorola México 200. Harvick placed second, losing to Martin Truex Jr., in the Mexico City race.

== See also ==
- List of confectionery brands
