= 2020 Skip's Western Outfitters 175 =

Race details
- Race 1 of 6 of the 2020 ARCA Menards Series East
- Official name: 7th Annual Skip's Western Outfitters 175
- Location: New Smyrna Beach, Florida, New Smyrna Speedway
- Scheduled distance: 175 laps, 500 mi (804.672 km)
- Average speed: 66.374 miles per hour (106.819 km/h)

Pole position
Driver	Derek Griffith	Chad Bryant Racing
- Time: 18.673

Most laps led
Driver	Derek Griffith	Chad Bryant Racing
- Laps: 144

Winner
No. 21	Sam Mayer	GMS Racing

Television in the United States
- Network: TrackPass
- Announcers: Charles Krall

Radio in the United States
- Radio: ARCA Racing Network

The 2020 Skip's Western Outfitters 175 was the first stock car race of the 2020 ARCA Menards Series East season and the seventh iteration of the event. The race was held on Monday, February 10, 2020, in New Smyrna Beach, Florida at New Smyrna Speedway, a 0.5 miles (0.80 km) oval-shaped racetrack. The race took the scheduled 175 laps to complete. At race's end, Sam Mayer of GMS Racing would make a late race charge to the front to win his fifth career ARCA Menards Series East win and his first of the season. To fill out the podium, Derek Griffith of Chad Bryant Racing and Ty Gibbs of Joe Gibbs Racing would finish second and third, respectively.

== Background ==
New Smyrna Speedway is a 1/2-mile asphalt oval racetrack located near New Smyrna Beach, Florida, that races the NASCAR Advance Auto Parts Weekly Series every Saturday night. It also has a smaller track, known as "Little New Smyrna Speedway" in the infield. This track races quarter midgets on Friday nights.

=== Entry list ===
#	Driver	Team	Make	Sponsor
1	Max McLaughlin	Hattori Racing Enterprises	Toyota	Toyota Racing Development
2	Derek Griffith	Chad Bryant Racing	Ford	Chad Bryant Racing
3	Willie Mullins	Mullins Racing	Ford	CW Metals, Crow Wing Recycling
4	Chase Cabre	Rev Racing	Toyota	Eibach, Max Siegel Incorporated
6	Nick Sanchez	Rev Racing	Toyota	Universal Technical Institute, NASCAR Technical Institute
09	Stephen Nasse	Jett Motorsports	Ford	Noland's Roofing, Inc.
11	Chuck Hiers	Fast Track Racing	Toyota	Gleckler & Sons, Ashley Home
11E	Robert Pawlowski	Robert Pawlowski Racing	Chevrolet	Channel Daily Clips Central
16	Gio Scelzi	Bill McAnally Racing	Toyota	NAPA Auto Parts
17	Tanner Gray	DGR-Crosley	Ford	Ford Performance
18	Ty Gibbs	Joe Gibbs Racing	Toyota	Monster Energy
19	Jesse Love	Bill McAnally Racing	Toyota	NAPA Power Premium Plus
20	Corey Heim	Venturini Motorsports	Toyota	Craftsman
21	Sam Mayer	GMS Racing	Chevrolet	Chevrolet Accessories
25	Mason Diaz	Venturini Motorsports	Toyota	Solid Rock Carriers
30	Tristan Van Wieringen	Rette Jones Racing	Toyota	Durobyte
42	Parker Retzlaff	Cook-Finley Racing	Toyota	Ponsse, Ironhorse Loggers
43	Daniel Dye	Ben Kennedy Racing	Chevrolet	Heise LED Lighting Systems, Jeep Beach
50	Holley Hollan	Bill McAnally Racing	Toyota	JBL
74	Giovanni Bromante	Visconti Motorsports	Chevrolet	Bromante Landscape and Design, Sandler Capital Management
80	Brian Finney	Finney Racing Enterprises	Chevrolet	Finney Racing Enterprises
91	Justin Carroll	TC Motorsports	Toyota	Carroll's Automotive
99	Gracie Trotter	Bill McAnally Racing	Toyota	Eneos
Official entry list

== Practice ==
The only 100-minute practice session was held on Monday, February 10. Sam Mayer of GMS Racing would set the fastest time in the session, with a time of 18.378 and an average speed of 94.025 miles per hour (151.319 km/h).

Pos.	#	Driver	Team	Make	Time	Speed
1	21	Sam Mayer	GMS Racing	Chevrolet	18.378	94.025
2	2	Derek Griffith	Chad Bryant Racing	Ford	18.444	93.689
3	20	Corey Heim	Venturini Motorsports	Toyota	18.524	93.284
Full practice results

== Qualifying ==
Qualifying was held on Monday, February 10, at 5:30 PM EST. Each driver would have two laps to set a fastest time; the fastest of the two would count as their official qualifying lap.

Derek Griffith of Chad Bryant Racing would win the pole, setting a time of 18.673 and an average speed of 92.540 miles per hour (148.929 km/h).

=== Full qualifying results ===
Pos.	#	Driver	Team	Make	Time	Speed
1	2	Derek Griffith	Chad Bryant Racing	Ford	18.673	92.540
2	1	Max McLaughlin	Hattori Racing Enterprises	Toyota	18.736	92.229
3	6	Nick Sanchez	Rev Racing	Toyota	18.752	92.150
4	18	Ty Gibbs	Joe Gibbs Racing	Toyota	18.766	92.081
5	20	Corey Heim	Venturini Motorsports	Toyota	18.802	91.905
6	21	Sam Mayer	GMS Racing	Chevrolet	18.828	91.778
7	43	Daniel Dye	Ben Kennedy Racing	Chevrolet	18.894	91.458
8	09	Stephen Nasse	Jett Motorsports	Ford	18.894	91.458
9	74	Giovanni Bromante	Visconti Motorsports	Chevrolet	18.926	91.303
10	25	Mason Diaz	Venturini Motorsports	Toyota	18.944	91.216
11	17	Tanner Gray	DGR-Crosley	Ford	18.948	91.197
12	4	Chase Cabre	Rev Racing	Toyota	19.001	90.943
13	30	Tristan Van Wieringen	Rette Jones Racing	Toyota	19.004	90.928
14	19	Jesse Love	Bill McAnally Racing	Toyota	19.004	90.928
15	42	Parker Retzlaff	Cook-Finley Racing	Toyota	19.056	90.680
16	16	Gio Scelzi	Bill McAnally Racing	Toyota	19.157	90.202
17	91	Justin Carroll	TC Motorsports	Toyota	19.195	90.023
18	50	Holley Hollan	Bill McAnally Racing	Toyota	19.222	89.897
19	80	Brian Finney	Finney Racing Enterprises	Chevrolet	19.369	89.215
20	99	Gracie Trotter	Bill McAnally Racing	Toyota	19.451	88.839
21	11	Chuck Hiers	Fast Track Racing	Toyota	19.669	87.854
22	11E	Robert Pawlowski	Robert Pawlowski Racing	Chevrolet	21.139	81.745
23	3	Willie Mullins	Mullins Racing	Ford	—	—
Official qualifying results

== Race results ==
Fin	St	#	Driver	Team	Make	Laps	Led	Status	Pts
1	6	21	Sam Mayer	GMS Racing	Chevrolet	175	27	running	48
2	1	2	Derek Griffith	Chad Bryant Racing	Ford	175	144	running	45
3	4	18	Ty Gibbs	Joe Gibbs Racing	Toyota	175	4	running	42
4	3	6	Nick Sanchez	Rev Racing	Toyota	175	0	running	40
5	9	74	Giovanni Bromante	Visconti Motorsports	Chevrolet	175	0	running	39
6	8	09	Stephen Nasse	Jett Motorsports	Ford	175	0	running	38
7	5	20	Corey Heim	Venturini Motorsports	Toyota	175	0	running	37
8	15	42	Parker Retzlaff	Cook-Finley Racing	Toyota	175	0	running	36
9	12	4	Chase Cabre	Rev Racing	Toyota	175	0	running	35
10	2	1	Max McLaughlin	Hattori Racing Enterprises	Toyota	175	0	running	34
11	13	30	Tristan Van Wieringen	Rette Jones Racing	Toyota	175	0	running	33
12	14	19	Jesse Love	Bill McAnally Racing	Toyota	175	0	running	32
13	16	16	Gio Scelzi	Bill McAnally Racing	Toyota	175	0	running	31
14	19	80	Brian Finney	Finney Racing Enterprises	Chevrolet	172	0	running	30
15	18	50	Holley Hollan	Bill McAnally Racing	Toyota	172	0	running	29
16	20	99	Gracie Trotter	Bill McAnally Racing	Toyota	169	0	running	28
17	10	25	Mason Diaz	Venturini Motorsports	Toyota	158	0	steering	27
18	11	17	Tanner Gray	DGR-Crosley	Ford	153	0	crash	26
19	7	43	Daniel Dye	Ben Kennedy Racing	Chevrolet	139	0	crash	25
20	23	3	Willie Mullins	Mullins Racing	Ford	124	0	running	24
21	17	91	Justin Carroll	TC Motorsports	Toyota	105	0	oil pan	23
22	21	11	Chuck Hiers	Fast Track Racing	Toyota	38	0	handling	22
23	22	11E	Robert Pawlowski	Robert Pawlowski Racing	Chevrolet	30	0	fuel pump	21
Official race results

Previous race: 2019 General Tire 125	ARCA Menards Series East; 2020 season	Next race: 2020 Herr's Potato Chips 200
