= 2020 Pensacola 200 =

2020 Pensacola 200 presented by Inspectra Thermal Solutions
Race details
- Race 6 of 6 of the 2020 ARCA Menards Series East
- Date: October 11, 2020
- Official name: 7th Annual Pensacola 200 presented by Inspectra Thermal Solutions
- Location: Pensacola, Florida, Five Flags Speedway
- Course: Permanent racing facility
- Course length: 0.5 miles (0.8 km)
- Distance: 206 laps, 103 mi (165.762 km)
- Scheduled distance: 200 laps, 100 mi (160 km)
- Average speed: 70.804 miles per hour (113.948 km/h)

Pole position
Driver	Grant Enfinger	Chad Bryant Racing
- Time: 17.461

Most laps led
Driver	Grant Enfinger	Chad Bryant Racing
- Laps: 175

Winner
No. 21	Sam Mayer	GMS Racing

Television in the United States
- Network: TrackPass
- Announcers: Charles Krall

Radio in the United States
- Radio: ARCA Racing Network

The 2020 Pensacola 200 presented by Inspectra Thermal Solutions was the sixth and final stock car race of the 2020 ARCA Menards Series East season and the seventh iteration of the event. The race was held on Sunday, October 11, 2020, in Pensacola, Florida, at Five Flags Speedway, a 0.5 miles (0.80 km) paved oval-shaped racetrack. The race took the scheduled 200 laps to complete. At race's end, Sam Mayer of GMS Racing would pass a dominating Grant Enfinger and hold off the field to win the 2020 ARCA Menards Series East championship in dominating fashion. The win was Mayer's ninth career win in the ARCA Menards Series East and his fifth and final win of the season. To fill out the podium, Corey Heim of Venturini Motorsports and Ty Gibbs of Joe Gibbs Racing would finish second and third, respectively.

== Background ==
Five Flags Speedway is a paved half mile (0.8 km) auto racing oval in Pensacola, Florida, United States. It opened in 1953 and is located on Pine Forest Road. It is christened after the nickname of Pensacola—"City of Five Flags."

It runs several local classes during the regular racing season (March – October). These classes include Super Late Models, Pro Late Models, Pro Trucks, Outlaw Stocks, Sportsman, and Pure Stocks. The races are usual held on Friday nights bi-weekly. The track has also hosted many regional touring series.

=== Entry list ===
#	Driver	Team	Make	Sponsor
1	Max McLaughlin*	Hattori Racing Enterprises	Toyota	Mohawk Northeast
2	Derek Griffith**	Chad Bryant Racing	Ford	Original Gourmet Lollipops
4E	Chase Cabre	Rev Racing	Toyota	Eibach, Honda Generators, Castle Packs Power
6	Nick Sanchez	Rev Racing	Toyota	Universal Technical Institute, NASCAR Technical Institute
09	Stephen Nasse*	Jett Motorsports	Toyota	Jett Motorsports
10	Richard Garvie	Fast Track Racing	Ford	Fast Track Racing
11	D. L. Wilson	Fast Track Racing	Chevrolet	Fast Track Racing
14	Connor Okrzesik	Connor Okrzesik Racing	Chevrolet	Metro Glass
15	Jesse Love	Venturini Motorsports	Toyota	JBL
17	Taylor Gray	DGR-Crosley	Ford	Ford Performance
18	Ty Gibbs	Joe Gibbs Racing	Toyota	Monster Energy
20	Corey Heim	Venturini Motorsports	Toyota	Craftsman
21	Sam Mayer	GMS Racing	Chevrolet	American Foundation for Suicide Prevention "End Stigma. Change Lives."
22	Brandon Oakley**	Brandon Oakley Racing	Toyota	Oakley Blacktop
22	Derek Griffith**	Chad Bryant Racing	Ford	Original Gourmet Lollipops
23	Bret Holmes*	Bret Holmes Racing	Toyota	Holmes II Excavation
25	Mason Diaz	Venturini Motorsports	Toyota	Solid Rock Carriers
30	Tristan Van Wieringen*	Rette Jones Racing	Ford	Durobyte
42	Parker Retzlaff	Cook-Finley Racing	Toyota	Ponsse, Ironhorse Loggers
43	Daniel Dye	Ben Kennedy Racing	Chevrolet	Heise LED Lighting Systems, Jeep Beach
48	Brad Smith	Brad Smith Motorsports	Chevrolet	Henshaw Automation
53	Max Gutiérrez	Troy Williams Racing	Toyota	ToughBuilt
63	Dave Mader III	Spraker Racing Enterprises	Chevrolet	American Apparel, Diamond C Ranch
74	Giovanni Bromante*	Visconti Motorsports	Chevrolet	Bromante Landscape
77	Grant Enfinger	Chad Bryant Racing	Ford	Champion Power Equipment
91	Justin Carroll	TC Motorsports	Toyota	Carroll's Automotive
Official entry list

*Withdrew.

*Originally, Oakley would drive the #22, and Griffith would drive the #2. However, Oakley would withdraw, and Chad Bryant Racing would decide to switch back to their usual #22.

== Qualifying ==
Qualifying was held on Sunday, October 11. Each driver would have 40 minutes to set a fastest time; the fastest of their laps would count as their official qualifying lap.

Grant Enfinger of Chad Bryant Racing would win the pole, setting a time of 17.461 and an average speed of 103.087 miles per hour (165.902 km/h).

=== Full qualifying results ===
Pos.	#	Driver	Team	Make	Time	Speed
1	77	Grant Enfinger	Chad Bryant Racing	Ford	17.461	103.087
2	17	Taylor Gray	DGR-Crosley	Ford	17.502	102.845
3	21	Sam Mayer	GMS Racing	Chevrolet	17.528	102.693
4	18	Ty Gibbs	Joe Gibbs Racing	Toyota	17.566	102.471
5	4E	Chase Cabre	Rev Racing	Toyota	17.573	102.430
6	20	Corey Heim	Venturini Motorsports	Toyota	17.582	102.377
7	25	Mason Diaz	Venturini Motorsports	Toyota	17.645	102.012
8	22	Derek Griffith	Chad Bryant Racing	Ford	17.649	101.989
9	43	Daniel Dye	Ben Kennedy Racing	Chevrolet	17.669	101.873
10	6	Nick Sanchez	Rev Racing	Toyota	17.690	101.752
11	42	Parker Retzlaff	Cook-Finley Racing	Toyota	17.774	101.272
12	63	Dave Mader III	Spraker Racing Enterprises	Chevrolet	17.786	101.203
13	15	Jesse Love	Venturini Motorsports	Toyota	17.824	100.987
14	53	Max Gutiérrez	Troy Williams Racing	Toyota	17.971	100.161
15	14	Connor Okrzesik	Connor Okrzesik Racing	Chevrolet	18.053	99.706
16	91	Justin Carroll	TC Motorsports	Toyota	18.310	98.307
17	10	Richard Garvie	Fast Track Racing	Ford	19.389	92.836
18	48	Brad Smith	Brad Smith Motorsports	Chevrolet	20.087	89.610
19	11	D. L. Wilson	Fast Track Racing	Chevrolet	21.578	83.418
Withdrew
WD	1	Max McLaughlin	Hattori Racing Enterprises	Toyota	—	—
WD	2	Derek Griffith	Chad Bryant Racing	Ford	—	—
WD	09	Stephen Nasse	Jett Motorsports	Toyota	—	—
WD	22	Brandon Oakley	Brandon Oakley Racing	Toyota	—	—
WD	23	Bret Holmes	Bret Holmes Racing	Toyota	—	—
WD	30	Tristan Van Wieringen	Rette Jones Racing	Ford	—	—
WD	74	Giovanni Bromante	Visconti Motorsports	Chevrolet	—	—
Official qualifying results

== Race results ==
Fin	St	#	Driver	Team	Make	Laps	Led	Status	Pts
1	3	21	Sam Mayer	GMS Racing	Chevrolet	206	31	running	47
2	6	20	Corey Heim	Venturini Motorsports	Toyota	206	0	running	42
3	4	18	Ty Gibbs	Joe Gibbs Racing	Toyota	206	0	running	41
4	2	17	Taylor Gray	DGR-Crosley	Ford	206	0	running	40
5	1	77	Grant Enfinger	Chad Bryant Racing	Ford	206	175	running	42
6	13	15	Jesse Love	Venturini Motorsports	Toyota	206	0	running	38
7	9	43	Daniel Dye	Ben Kennedy Racing	Chevrolet	206	0	running	37
8	16	91	Justin Carroll	TC Motorsports	Toyota	206	0	running	36
9	10	6	Nick Sanchez	Rev Racing	Toyota	206	0	running	35
10	11	42	Parker Retzlaff	Cook-Finley Racing	Toyota	206	0	running	34
11	12	63	Dave Mader III	Spraker Racing Enterprises	Chevrolet	206	0	running	33
12	14	53	Max Gutiérrez	Troy Williams Racing	Toyota	205	0	running	32
13	8	22	Derek Griffith	Chad Bryant Racing	Ford	205	0	running	31
14	5	4E	Chase Cabre	Rev Racing	Toyota	197	0	crash	30
15	17	10	Richard Garvie	Fast Track Racing	Ford	192	0	running	29
16	7	25	Mason Diaz	Venturini Motorsports	Toyota	191	0	running	28
17	15	14	Connor Okrzesik	Connor Okrzesik Racing	Chevrolet	189	0	running	27
18	18	48	Brad Smith	Brad Smith Motorsports	Chevrolet	32	0	mechanical	26
19	19	11	D. L. Wilson	Fast Track Racing	Chevrolet	25	0	mechanical	25
Withdrew
WD		1	Max McLaughlin	Hattori Racing Enterprises	Toyota				
WD		2	Derek Griffith	Chad Bryant Racing	Ford				
WD		09	Stephen Nasse	Jett Motorsports	Toyota				
WD		22	Brandon Oakley	Brandon Oakley Racing	Toyota				
WD		23	Bret Holmes	Bret Holmes Racing	Toyota				
WD		30	Tristan Van Wieringen	Rette Jones Racing	Ford				
WD		74	Giovanni Bromante	Visconti Motorsports	Chevrolet				
Official race results

Previous race: 2020 Bush's Beans 200	ARCA Menards Series East; 2020 season	Next race: 2021 Jeep Beach 175
