= Michael Self =

American racing driver (born 1990)

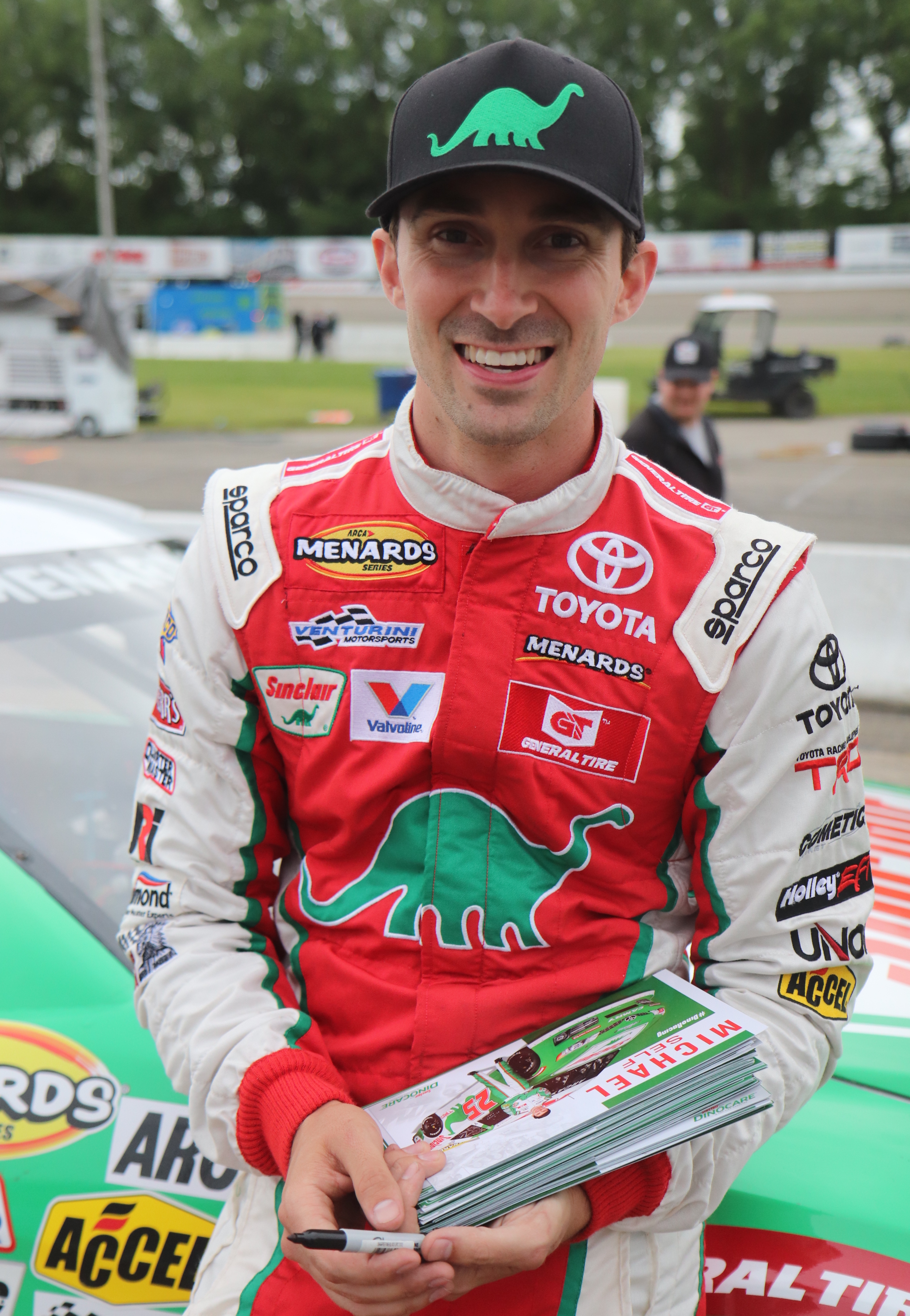
- Self at Madison International Speedway in 2019
- Born: November 1, 1990 (age 36) Park City, Utah, U.S.

ARCA Menards Series career
- Debut season: 2014
- Current team: Venturini Motorsports
- Car number: 25
- Engine: Toyota
- Crew chief: Kevin Reed
- Former teams: Ranier Racing with MDM, MDM Motorsports
- Starts: 59
- Wins: 9
- Poles: 6
- Best finish: 2nd in 2020, 2019

NASCAR O'Reilly Auto Parts Series career
- 7 races run over 1 year
- 2015 position: 40th
- Best finish: 40th (2015)
- First race: 2015 U.S. Cellular 250 (Iowa)
- Last race: 2015 Kansas Lottery 300 (Kansas)
Wins	Top tens	Poles
0	0	0
- Statistics up to date as of October 4, 2020.

Previous series
- 2009–2013, 2017: NASCAR K&N Pro Series West

Michael Self (born November 1, 1990) is an American former professional stock car racing driver. He last competed full-time in the ARCA Menards Series, driving the No. 25 Toyota Camry for Venturini Motorsports. He was a former development driver for Richard Childress Racing, and has made seven NASCAR Xfinity Series starts for JD Motorsports. He has eight wins in the NASCAR K&N Pro Series West, and nine wins in ARCA competition.

== Racing career ==
=== Early years ===
Self started racing at age eleven in go-karts. Self was a Rotax Max driver and won a regional championship and finished well enough in the national championship to represent America in the world championships. He switched to open-wheel cars five years later and came to stock cars at age eighteen, debuting in late models. The stock car opportunity came around the time of the CART-IndyCar split; Self had scholarship money from Mazda waiting but passed on the opportunity. Throughout his early developmental career, Self's family funded his efforts; the family ran out of money around 2013.

=== K&N Pro Series West ===
In 2009, Self ran two races with Motorway Motorsports, starting and parking. After going full-time with Motorway in 2010, Self was signed by the Golden Gate Racing Team, a team owned by Jim Offenbach which was an affiliate of Richard Childress Racing, for the final two races of the season.

The partnership with GGRT extended into 2011, with Self driving top-tier equipment. However, there were missteps, like a crash in Sonoma qualifying that relegated him to the back of the field. With a car that his crew chief described as "winning", Self worked his way through the field using his car and crashed again, finishing 25th. He finished seventh in points with three top fives. The following year, Self broke out, winning three races and only finishing out of the top ten six times in a fifteen race season. He improved to sixth in points. In 2013, Self won three races in a row and never fell out of the top six in points to finish fourth. Despite the six wins, Self did not return to the RCR driver development lineup in 2014.

In 2017, Self returned to the West Series for a part-time schedule of races with Sunrise Ford Racing. He was contacted by team owner Bob Bruncati about running the car, and initially refused on a basis of a lack of sponsorship. Once Bruncati made it known that no sponsorship was needed, Self agreed to drive it for the rest of the season. He won the race at Meridian Speedway after Chris Eggleston was disqualified for jumping the final restart. He finished in the top ten in all of his starts and won another race, at All American Speedway.

=== ARCA Menards Series ===
With no ride in the K&N Pro Series West, Self joined Venturini Motorsports for two ARCA Racing Series events in 2014, the first at Mobile International Speedway. He failed to finish either of his starts due to mechanical issues. Again without a ride in any national series, Self partnered with Ranier Racing with MDM for a race at Kansas Speedway in 2016, in which he finished third. He spotted for Justin Haley in 2015 and 2016 at various races.

In January 2017, Self announced that he would return to the No. 28 for the renamed MDM Motorsports (due to Ranier leaving the team as a co-owner) for the season-opening race at Daytona. After running inside the top ten at Daytona, Sinclair Oil Corporation added more races with Self in both the ARCA series and K&N Series with MDM and Mason Mitchell Motorsports on the ARCA side and Sunrise Ford Racing on the NASCAR side. Self finished inside the top five in three of his next four races before he won the season finale at Kansas Speedway, beating out Ty Majeski in a five-wide race after the final restart. Self gave the credit to his spotter Derek Kneeland, who also was the spotter for NASCAR Cup Series driver Kyle Larson at the time.

On January 8, 2018, it was announced that Self and Sinclair partnered with Venturini Motorsports for half of the 2018 ARCA Racing Series schedule. The schedule includes races at Daytona, Nashville, Talladega, Charlotte, Michigan, Chicagoland, Lucas Oil Raceway, Salem and Kansas. Both driver and sponsor had previous experience with Venturini, as Self had raced with the team in ARCA and the Venturini family had operated Sinclair gas stations.

Self began the 2018 ARCA season by winning the season-opening Lucas Oil 200 at Daytona. He followed up with a win at Chicagoland in late June, avenging a near-loss in the 2017 edition of the event. Self beat Riley Herbst and Sheldon Creed on the final restart to secure the victory. At Salem Speedway in fall, Self and Zane Smith got in a racing incident early in the race, leading Smith to retaliate by intentionally destroying Self's car later in the race. Smith was later penalized by ARCA for the incident.

On January 11, 2019, Self and Venturini announced a full schedule for the 2019 ARCA Menards Series season in the team's No. 25 entry. He won the series' first trip to Five Flags Speedway since 1996 in March, outlasting Kaden Honeycutt and Ty Gibbs during the final green-flag run. He followed that up with a win in the season's third race at Salem Speedway after rain arrived after 101 of 200 laps, ultimately handing him the win. At Charlotte Motor Speedway in May, Self won the pole, led the most laps and at one point had over a 10-second advantage over the field, but slapped the wall in the closing portion of the race and faded to fifth. He continued his tear in the front half of the season by leading 85 or 100 laps and winning at Michigan International Speedway in June, but was penalized after the race, keeping his points lead small. At the Allen Crowe 100, Self claimed his first dirt triumph, beating Venturini teammate Christian Eckes on a late restart. Late-season mechanical failures and a lack of restart speed in the season finale at Kansas Speedway, dropping Self to second in the season-long points tally behind Eckes.

After originally only securing enough funding for a partial season, Self returned full-time to Venturini Motorsports in 2020. He began the season by winning the Lucas Oil 200 at Daytona. Self won his second race of the season at the General Tire 100, the series' inaugural race on the road course layout at Daytona. He finished second in the championship to Bret Holmes.

=== Xfinity Series ===
Self made his first Xfinity Series start in 2015, replacing Landon Cassill at Iowa Speedway in JD Motorsports' No. 01 entry. In doing so, Self became the first driver from Utah to compete in a NASCAR national series. After crashing in his first start, Self ran six other races for JD, culminating in an eleventh-place finish at Road America driving the No. 4.

== Personal life ==
Self attended the University of Utah. He later attended Central Piedmont Community College, UNC Charlotte and UNC Greensboro. When he is not racing, he is a road racing coach and has worked with Chip Ganassi Racing. Self moved from Utah to California at the genesis of his K&N career and then later to North Carolina around 2014. Self and his wife Dana married in 2017.

== Motorsports career results ==
=== NASCAR ===
(key) (Bold – Pole position awarded by qualifying time. Italics – Pole position earned by points standings or practice time. * – Most laps led.)

==== Xfinity Series ====
NASCAR Xfinity Series results
Year	Team	No.	Make	1	2	3	4	5	6	7	8	9	10	11	12	13	14	15	16	17	18	19	20	21	22	23	24	25	26	27	28	29	30	31	32	33	NXSC	Pts	Ref
2015	JD Motorsports	01	Chevy	DAY	ATL	LVS	PHO	CAL	TEX	BRI	RCH	TAL	IOW	CLT	DOV	MCH	CHI	DAY	KEN	NHA	IND	IOW; 32								KEN; 36	DOV	CLT					40th	108	
2015	JD Motorsports	0	Chevy																				GLN; 37	MOH; 27	BRI				CHI; 25				KAN; 32	TEX	PHO	HOM	40th	108	
2015	JD Motorsports	4	Chevy																							ROA; 11	DAR	RCH									40th	108	

==== K&N Pro Series West ====
NASCAR K&N Pro Series West results
Year	Team	No.	Make	1	2	3	4	5	6	7	8	9	10	11	12	13	14	15	NKNPSWC	Pts	Ref
2009	Viva Motorsports	84	Chevy	CTS	AAS	PHO	MAD	IOW	DCS	SON	IRW	PIR; 23	MMP; 25	CNS	IOW	AAS			43rd	182	
2010	Viva Motorsports	88	Chevy	AAS; 14	PHO; 10	IOW; 13	DCS; 17	SON; 5	IRW; 11	PIR; 11	MRP; 8	CNS; 7	MMP; 28						8th	1552	
2010	Richard Childress Racing	21	Chevy											AAS; 12	PHO; 8				8th	1552	
2011	Richard Childress Racing	21	Chevy	PHO; 15	AAS; 14	MMP; 8	IOW; 8	LVS; 4	SON; 25	IRW; 5	EVG; 11	PIR; 8	CNS; 13	MRP; 5	SPO; 6	AAS; 20	PHO; 32		7th	1807	
2012	Richard Childress Racing	21	Chevy	PHO; 18	LHC; 4	MMP; 18	S99; 20	IOW; 4	BIR; 1	LVS; 17	SON; 6	EVG; 2	CNS; 4	IOW; 1	PIR; 2	SMP; 12	AAS; 22	PHO; 1*	6th	541	
2013	Richard Childress Racing	21	Chevy	PHO; 3	S99; 15	BIR; 1	IOW; 1*	L44; 1	SON; 3*	CNS; 6	IOW; 3	EVG; 16	SPO; 6*	MMP; 4	SMP; 5	AAS; 4	KCR; 2	PHO; 9	4th	598	
2017	Sunrise Ford Racing	9	Ford	TUS	KCR; 6	IRW; 6	IRW; 3	SPO; 5	OSS; 8	CNS; 8	SON; 4	IOW; 6	EVG; 4	DCS; 7	MER; 1	**AAS**; 1*	KCR; 4		4th	522	

=== ARCA Menards Series ===
(key) (Bold – Pole position awarded by qualifying time. Italics – Pole position earned by points standings or practice time. * – Most laps led.)

ARCA Menards Series results
Year	Team	No.	Make	1	2	3	4	5	6	7	8	9	10	11	12	13	14	15	16	17	18	19	20	AMSC	Pts	Ref
2014	Venturini Motorsports	66	Toyota	DAY	MOB; 18	SLM	TAL	TOL	NJE; 22	POC	MCH	ELK	WIN	CHI	IRP	POC	BLN	ISF	MAD	DSF	SLM	KEN	KAN	63rd	260	
2016	Ranier Racing with MDM	28	Chevy	DAY	NSH	SLM	TAL	TOL	NJE	POC	MCH	MAD	WIN	IOW	IRP	POC	BLN	ISF	DSF	SLM	CHI	KEN	KAN; 3	90th	215	
2017	MDM Motorsports	28	Toyota	DAY; 27	NSH	SLM	TAL	TOL	ELK															24th	1135	
2017	Mason Mitchell Motorsports	28	Chevy							POC; 3	MCH	MAD	IOW; 4											24th	1135	
2017	MDM Motorsports	28	Chevy											IRP; 2	POC	WIN	ISF	ROA	DSF	SLM			KAN; 1	24th	1135	
2017	Mason Mitchell Motorsports	88	Chevy																		CHI; 17	KEN		24th	1135	
2018	Venturini Motorsports	15	Toyota	DAY; 1			**TAL**; 3	TOL	CLT; 21	POC	MCH; 3	MAD	GTW	CHI; 1									KAN; 3	15th	1985	
2018	Venturini Motorsports	55	Toyota		NSH; 4	SLM									IOW; 18	ELK	POC	ISF	BLN	DSF	SLM; 16	IRP; 11		15th	1985	
2019	Venturini Motorsports	25	Toyota	DAY; 31	FIF; 1	SLM; 1*	TAL; 5	NSH; 15	**TOL**; 4	**CLT**; 5*	POC; 11	**MCH**; 1*	MAD; 2	GTW; 13*	**CHI**; 4	ELK; 4	IOW; 3	POC; 3	ISF; 1*	DSF; 4	SLM; 14	IRP; 6	KAN; 2*	2nd	5020	
2020	Venturini Motorsports	25	Toyota	**DAY**; 1*	PHO; 2	TAL; 5	POC; 5	IRP; 8	KEN; 3	IOW; 6	KAN; 6	TOL; 5	TOL; 4	MCH; 3	DRC; 1	GTW; 15	I44; 6	TOL; 7	BRI; 5	WIN; 2	MEM; 6	ISF; 9	KAN; 5	2nd	941	

==== ARCA Menards Series East ====
ARCA Menards Series East results
Year	Team	No.	Make	1	2	3	4	5	6	AMSEC	Pts	Ref
2020	Venturini Motorsports	25	Toyota	NSM	TOL	DOV	TOL; 7	BRI; 5	FIF	23rd	78	

^{*} Season still in progress
^{1} Ineligible for series points
