= 2020 Herr's Potato Chips 200 =

Race details
- Race 2 of 6 of the 2020 ARCA Menards Series East
- Date: June 13, 2020
- Official name: Herr's Potato Chips 200
- Location: Toledo, Ohio, Toledo Speedway
- Course: Permanent racing facility
- Course length: 0.8 km (0.5 miles)
- Distance: 204 laps, 102 mi (164 km)
- Scheduled distance: 200 laps, 100 mi (160 km)
- Average speed: 67.401 miles per hour (108.471 km/h)

Pole position
Driver	Sam Mayer	GMS Racing
- Time: 16.014

Most laps led
Driver	Ty Gibbs	Joe Gibbs Racing
- Laps: 183

Winner
No. 18	Ty Gibbs	Joe Gibbs Racing

Television in the United States
- Network: TrackPass
- Announcers: Charles Krall, Ken Schrader

Radio in the United States
- Radio: ARCA Racing Network

The 2020 Herr's Potato Chips 200 was the second stock car race of the 2020 ARCA Menards Series East season. The race was held on Saturday, June 13, 2020, in Toledo, Ohio, at Toledo Speedway, a 0.5-mile (0.80-km) permanent oval-shaped racetrack. The race was extended from its scheduled 200 laps to 204 due to a NASCAR overtime finish. At race's end, Ty Gibbs of Joe Gibbs Racing would maintain his dominance of the race on the final restart to win his second career ARCA Menards Series East win and his first of the season. To fill out the podium, Sam Mayer of GMS Racing and Bret Holmes of Bret Holmes Racing would finish second and third, respectively.

== Background ==
Toledo Speedway opened in 1960 and was paved in 1964. In 1978 it was sold to Thomas "Sonny" Adams Sr. The speedway was reacquired by ARCA in 1999. The track also features the weekly racing divisions of sportsman on the half-mile and Figure 8, factory stock, and four cylinders on a quarter-mile track inside the big track. They also have a series of races with outlaw-bodied late models that includes four 100-lap races and ends with Glass City 200. The track hosts the “Fastest short track show in the world” which features winged sprints and winged Super Modifieds on the half mile. Toledo also used to host a 200-lap late model race until its sale to ARCA in 1999.

Toledo is known for the foam blocks that line the race track, different than the concrete walls that line many short tracks throughout America. The crumbling walls can make track cleanup a tedious task for workers.

=== Entry list ===
#	Driver	Team	Make	Sponsor
1	Max McLaughlin	Hattori Racing Enterprises	Toyota	Mohawk Northeast, Inc.
4	Chase Cabre	Rev Racing	Toyota	Eibach, Max Siegel Incorporated
6	Nick Sanchez	Rev Racing	Toyota	Universal Technical Institute, NASCAR Technical Institute
11	Mike Basham	Fast Track Racing	Toyota	Fast Track Racing
11E	Robert Pawlowski	Robert Pawlowski Racing	Chevrolet	Channel
17	Taylor Gray	DGR-Crosley	Ford	Ford Performance
18	Ty Gibbs	Joe Gibbs Racing	Toyota	Monster Energy
20	Ryan Repko	Venturini Motorsports	Toyota	Craftsman, McLain Group
21	Sam Mayer	GMS Racing	Chevrolet	All Weather Armour
23	Bret Holmes	Bret Holmes Racing	Chevrolet	Holmes II Excavating
25	Mason Diaz	Venturini Motorsports	Toyota	Solid Rock Carriers
42	Parker Retzlaff	Cook-Finley Racing	Toyota	Ponsse, Ironhorse Loggers
48	Brad Smith	Brad Smith Motorsports	Chevrolet	Home Building Solutions, NASCAR Low Teams
74	Giovanni Bromante	Visconti Motorsports	Chevrolet	Bromante Landscape and Design, Sandler Capital Management
91	Justin Carroll	TC Motorsports	Toyota	Carroll's Automotive
Official entry list

== Practice ==
The only 45-minute practice session was held on Saturday, June 13. Mason Diaz of Venturini Motorsports would set the fastest time in the session, with a lap of 16.196 and an average speed of 111.139 miles per hour (178.861 km/h).

Pos.	#	Driver	Team	Make	Time	Speed
1	25	Mason Diaz	Venturini Motorsports	Toyota	16.196	111.139
2	18	Ty Gibbs	Joe Gibbs Racing	Toyota	16.255	110.735
3	21	Sam Mayer	GMS Racing	Chevrolet	16.317	110.314
Full practice results

== Qualifying ==
Qualifying was held on Saturday, June 13, at 4:45 PM EST. Each driver would have two laps to set a fastest time; the fastest of the two would count as their official qualifying lap.

Sam Mayer of GMS Racing would win the pole, setting a time of 16.014 and an average speed of 112.402 miles per hour (180.893 km/h).

=== Full qualifying results ===
Pos.	#	Driver	Team	Make	Time	Speed
1	21	Sam Mayer	GMS Racing	Chevrolet	16.014	112.402
2	4	Chase Cabre	Rev Racing	Toyota	16.112	111.718
3	18	Ty Gibbs	Joe Gibbs Racing	Toyota	16.118	111.676
4	17	Taylor Gray	DGR-Crosley	Ford	16.127	111.614
5	74	Giovanni Bromante	Visconti Motorsports	Chevrolet	16.170	111.317
6	1	Max McLaughlin	Hattori Racing Enterprises	Toyota	16.244	110.810
7	23	Bret Holmes	Bret Holmes Racing	Chevrolet	16.254	110.742
8	6	Nick Sanchez	Rev Racing	Toyota	16.265	110.667
9	25	Mason Diaz	Venturini Motorsports	Toyota	16.286	110.524
10	42	Parker Retzlaff	Cook-Finley Racing	Toyota	16.499	109.098
11	20	Ryan Repko	Venturini Motorsports	Toyota	16.629	108.245
12	91	Justin Carroll	TC Motorsports	Toyota	16.786	107.232
13	11	Mike Basham	Fast Track Racing	Toyota	18.436	97.635
14	11E	Robert Pawlowski	Robert Pawlowski Racing	Chevrolet	18.503	97.282
15	48	Brad Smith	Brad Smith Motorsports	Chevrolet	19.976	90.108
Official qualifying results

== Race results ==
Fin	St	#	Driver	Team	Make	Laps	Led	Status	Pts
1	3	18	Ty Gibbs	Joe Gibbs Racing	Toyota	204	183	running	48
2	1	21	Sam Mayer	GMS Racing	Chevrolet	204	21	running	44
3	7	23	Bret Holmes	Bret Holmes Racing	Chevrolet	204	0	running	41
4	2	4	Chase Cabre	Rev Racing	Toyota	204	0	running	40
5	8	6	Nick Sanchez	Rev Racing	Toyota	204	0	running	39
6	12	91	Justin Carroll	TC Motorsports	Toyota	204	0	running	38
7	10	42	Parker Retzlaff	Cook-Finley Racing	Toyota	204	0	running	37
8	4	17	Taylor Gray	DGR-Crosley	Ford	197	0	running	36
9	11	20	Ryan Repko	Venturini Motorsports	Toyota	187	0	crash	35
10	14	11E	Robert Pawlowski	Robert Pawlowski Racing	Chevrolet	186	0	crash	34
11	5	74	Giovanni Bromante	Visconti Motorsports	Chevrolet	175	0	crash	33
12	6	1	Max McLaughlin	Hattori Racing Enterprises	Toyota	126	0	suspension	32
13	13	11	Mike Basham	Fast Track Racing	Toyota	44	0	vibration	31
14	9	25	Mason Diaz	Venturini Motorsports	Toyota	29	0	transmission	30
15	15	48	Brad Smith	Brad Smith Motorsports	Chevrolet	3	0	oil pressure	29
Official race results

Previous race: 2020 Skip's Western Outfitters 175	ARCA Menards Series East; 2020 season	Next race: 2020 General Tire 125
