= 2021 Bush's Beans 200 =

Race details
- Race 18 of 20 of the 2021 ARCA Menards Series; Race 8 of 8 of the 2021 ARCA Menards Series East; Race 9 of 10 of the 2021 Sioux Chief Showdown
- Date: September 16, 2021
- Official name: Third Annual Bush's Beans 200
- Location: Bristol, Tennessee, Bristol Motor Speedway
- Course: Permanent racing facility
- Course length: 0.533 miles (0.858 km)
- Distance: 200 laps, 106.6 mi (171.556 km)
- Scheduled distance: 200 laps, 106.6 mi (171.556 km)
- Average speed: 64.131 miles per hour (103.209 km/h)

Pole position
Driver	Ty Gibbs	Joe Gibbs Racing
- Time: 14.859

Most laps led
Driver	Ty Gibbs	Joe Gibbs Racing
- Laps: 197

Winner
No. 18	Ty Gibbs	Joe Gibbs Racing

Television in the United States
- Network: Fox Sports 1
- Announcers: Jamie Little, Phil Parsons, Trevor Bayne

Radio in the United States
- Radio: Motor Racing Network

The 2021 Bush's Beans 200 was the 18th stock car race of the 2021 ARCA Menards Series season, the eighth and final race of the 2021 ARCA Menards Series East season, the ninth race of the 2021 Sioux Chief Showdown, and the second iteration of the event. The race was held on Thursday, September 16, 2021 in Bristol, Tennessee, at Bristol Motor Speedway, a 0.533 miles (0.858 km) permanent oval-shaped racetrack. The race took the scheduled 200 laps to complete. At race's end, Ty Gibbs of Joe Gibbs Racing would win the race in dominating fashion, leading almost every lap and taking home his 18th career ARCA Menards Series win and his tenth of the season. Meanwhile, his teammate, Sammy Smith would come in second to clinch the 2021 ARCA Menards Series East championship, winning the championship by 34 points. To fill out the podium, Taylor Gray of David Gilliland Racing would finish third.

== Background ==
=== Entry list ===
#	Driver	Team	Make	Sponsor
01	Richard Garvie	Fast Track Racing	Toyota	The Brews Box
2	Nick Sanchez	Rev Racing	Chevrolet	Universal Technical Institute, NASCAR Technical Institute
6	Rajah Caruth	Rev Racing	Chevrolet	Max Siegel Incorporated, Sunoco
06	Don Thompson	Wayne Peterson Racing	Chevrolet	Great Railing
7	Eric Caudell*	CCM Racing	Toyota	Caudell Consulting & Marketing
10	Jade Buford	Fast Track Racing	Toyota	Big Machine Vodka Spiked Cooler
11	Mason Mingus	Fast Track Racing	Ford	Team Construction
12	D. L. Wilson	Fast Track Racing	Toyota	Tradinghouse Bar & Grill
15	Drew Dollar	Venturini Motorsports	Toyota	Sunbelt Rentals
17	Taylor Gray	David Gilliland Racing	Ford	Ripper Coffee Company
18	Ty Gibbs	Joe Gibbs Racing	Toyota	Joe Gibbs Racing
20	Corey Heim	Venturini Motorsports	Toyota	Craftsman
21	Daniel Dye	GMS Racing	Chevrolet	Heise LED Lighting, American Flat Track Charlotte Half Mile
22	Jack Wood	GMS Racing	Chevrolet	Chevrolet Accessories
23	Sam Mayer	Bret Holmes Racing	Chevrolet	QPS Employment Group
25	Jesse Love	Venturini Motorsports	Toyota	Mobil 1
27	Zachary Tinkle	Richmond Clubb Motorsports	Toyota	Indiana Owned
28	Kyle Sieg	RSS Racing	Chevrolet	Eastern Fuel Systems, Night Owl Contractors, Inc.
30	Max Gutiérrez	Rette Jones Racing	Ford	ToughBuilt
35	Greg Van Alst	Greg Van Alst Motorsports	Ford	CB Fabricating
42	Conner Jones	Cook-Finley Racing	Chevrolet	Jones Utilities
44	Stephanie Moyer	Ferrier-McClure Racing	Toyota	Evergreen Raceway
46	Thad Moffitt	David Gilliland Racing	Ford	Bac-D Bacterial Defense
48	Brad Smith	Brad Smith Motorsports	Chevrolet	Henshaw Automation
54	Joey Iest	David Gilliland Racing	Ford	Basila Ranch, Ag Solutions Network
55	Parker Chase	Venturini Motorsports	Toyota	NXTLVL Marine
73	Andy Jankowiak	Jankowiak Motorsports	Ford	Phillips 66, Dak's Market
74	Mason Diaz	Visconti Motorsports	Toyota	Solid Rock Carriers
81	Sammy Smith	Joe Gibbs Racing	Toyota	Engine Ice
87	Chuck Buchanan Jr.	Chuck Buchanan Racing	Ford	Spring Drug
91	Justin Carroll	TC Motorsports	Toyota	Carroll's Automatic
97	Jason Kitzmiller	CR7 Motorsports	Chevrolet	A. L. L. Construction
Official entry list

== Practice ==
The only 45-minute practice session was held on Thursday, September 16, at 2:30 p.m. EST. Ty Gibbs of Joe Gibbs Racing would set the fastest lap in the session, with a time of 14.941 and an average speed of 128.425 miles per hour (206.680 km/h).

Pos.	#	Driver	Team	Make	Time	Speed
1	18	Ty Gibbs	Joe Gibbs Racing	Toyota	14.941	128.425
2	81	Sammy Smith	Joe Gibbs Racing	Toyota	15.235	125.947
3	25	Jesse Love	Venturini Motorsports	Toyota	15.263	125.716
Full practice results

== Qualifying ==
Qualifying was held on Thursday, September 16, at 4:30 p.m. EST. The qualifying system used was a timed session. Ty Gibbs of Joe Gibbs Racing would win the pole for the race, setting a lap of 14.859 and an average speed of 129.134 miles per hour (207.821 km/h).

=== Full qualifying results ===
Pos.	#	Driver	Team	Make	Time	Speed
1	18	Ty Gibbs	Joe Gibbs Racing	Toyota	14.859	129.134
2	81	Sammy Smith	Joe Gibbs Racing	Toyota	15.042	127.563
3	21	Daniel Dye	GMS Racing	Chevrolet	15.203	126.212
4	25	Jesse Love	Venturini Motorsports	Toyota	15.205	126.195
5	20	Corey Heim	Venturini Motorsports	Toyota	15.227	126.013
6	2	Nick Sanchez	Rev Racing	Chevrolet	15.247	125.848
7	6	Rajah Caruth	Rev Racing	Chevrolet	15.290	125.494
8	22	Jack Wood	GMS Racing	Chevrolet	15.304	125.379
9	17	Taylor Gray	David Gilliland Racing	Ford	15.316	125.281
10	54	Joey Iest	David Gilliland Racing	Ford	15.343	125.060
11	46	Thad Moffitt	David Gilliland Racing	Ford	15.348	125.020
12	74	Mason Diaz	Visconti Motorsports	Toyota	15.360	124.922
13	55	Parker Chase	Venturini Motorsports	Toyota	15.452	124.178
14	91	Justin Carroll	TC Motorsports	Toyota	15.462	124.098
15	30	Max Gutiérrez	Rette Jones Racing	Ford	15.533	123.531
16	10	Jade Buford	Fast Track Racing	Toyota	15.546	123.427
17	28	Kyle Sieg	RSS Racing	Chevrolet	15.586	123.110
18	11	Mason Mingus	Fast Track Racing	Ford	15.607	122.945
19	73	Andy Jankowiak	Jankowiak Motorsports	Ford	15.626	122.795
20	15	Drew Dollar	Venturini Motorsports	Toyota	15.627	122.787
21	42	Conner Jones	Cook-Finley Racing	Chevrolet	15.647	122.631
22	23	Sam Mayer	Bret Holmes Racing	Chevrolet	15.665	122.490
23	35	Greg Van Alst	Greg Van Alst Motorsports	Ford	15.735	121.945
24	97	Jason Kitzmiller	CR7 Motorsports	Chevrolet	15.956	120.256
25	27	Zachary Tinkle	Richmond Clubb Motorsports	Toyota	16.220	118.298
26	12	D. L. Wilson	Fast Track Racing	Toyota	16.691	114.960
27	87	Chuck Buchanan Jr.	Chuck Buchanan Racing	Ford	17.171	111.747
28	01	Richard Garvie	Fast Track Racing	Toyota	17.925	107.046
29	44	Stephanie Moyer	Ferrier-McClure Racing	Toyota	17.977	106.736
30	06	Don Thompson	Wayne Peterson Racing	Chevrolet	19.543	98.183
31	48	Brad Smith	Brad Smith Motorsports	Chevrolet	—	—
Withdrew
WD	7	Eric Caudell	CCM Racing	Toyota	—	—
Official qualifying results

== Race results ==
Fin	St	#	Driver	Team	Make	Laps	Led	Status	Pts
1	1	18	Ty Gibbs	Joe Gibbs Racing	Toyota	200	197	running	49
2	2	81	Sammy Smith	Joe Gibbs Racing	Toyota	200	0	running	42
3	9	17	Taylor Gray	David Gilliland Racing	Ford	200	0	running	41
4	6	2	Nick Sanchez	Rev Racing	Chevrolet	200	0	running	40
5	5	20	Corey Heim	Venturini Motorsports	Toyota	200	0	running	39
6	7	6	Rajah Caruth	Rev Racing	Chevrolet	200	0	running	38
7	4	25	Jesse Love	Venturini Motorsports	Toyota	200	0	running	37
8	20	15	Drew Dollar	Venturini Motorsports	Toyota	200	0	running	36
9	13	55	Parker Chase	Venturini Motorsports	Toyota	200	0	running	35
10	21	42	Conner Jones	Cook-Finley Racing	Chevrolet	200	0	running	34
11	17	28	Kyle Sieg	RSS Racing	Chevrolet	200	0	running	33
12	3	21	Daniel Dye	GMS Racing	Chevrolet	200	0	running	32
13	8	22	Jack Wood	GMS Racing	Chevrolet	199	0	running	31
14	15	30	Max Gutiérrez	Rette Jones Racing	Ford	199	0	running	30
15	23	35	Greg Van Alst	Greg Van Alst Motorsports	Ford	199	0	running	29
16	14	91	Justin Carroll	TC Motorsports	Toyota	199	0	running	28
17	18	11	Mason Mingus	Fast Track Racing	Ford	198	0	running	27
18	16	10	Jade Buford	Fast Track Racing	Toyota	197	0	running	26
19	10	54	Joey Iest	David Gilliland Racing	Ford	196	0	running	25
20	25	27	Zachary Tinkle	Richmond Clubb Motorsports	Toyota	193	0	running	24
21	27	87	Chuck Buchanan Jr.	Chuck Buchanan Racing	Ford	189	0	running	23
22	24	97	Jason Kitzmiller	CR7 Motorsports	Chevrolet	188	0	running	22
23	28	01	Richard Garvie	Fast Track Racing	Toyota	181	0	running	21
24	31	48	Brad Smith	Brad Smith Motorsports	Chevrolet	174	0	running	20
25	11	46	Thad Moffitt	David Gilliland Racing	Ford	158	3	accident	20
26	19	73	Andy Jankowiak	Jankowiak Motorsports	Ford	136	0	accident	18
27	29	44	Stephanie Moyer	Ferrier-McClure Racing	Toyota	76	0	electrical	17
28	26	12	D. L. Wilson	Fast Track Racing	Toyota	70	0	engine	16
29	22	23	Sam Mayer	Bret Holmes Racing	Chevrolet	47	0	radiator	15
30	30	06	Don Thompson	Wayne Peterson Racing	Chevrolet	14	0	brakes	14
31	12	74	Mason Diaz	Visconti Motorsports	Toyota	2	0	battery	13
Withdrew
WD		7	Eric Caudell	CCM Racing	Toyota				
Official race results

Previous race: 2021 Southern Illinois 100	ARCA Menards Series; 2021 season	Next race: 2021 Sioux Chief PowerPEX 200

Previous race: 2021 Sprecher 150	ARCA Menards Series East; 2021 season	Next race: 2022 Race to Stop Suicide 200
