= 2020 Menards.com 200 =

2020 Menards.com 200 Presented by SPxE
Race details
- Race 9 of 20 of the 2020 ARCA Menards Series; Race 4 of 10 of the 2020 Sioux Chief Showdown
- Date: July 31, 2020
- Official name: Menards.com 200 Presented by SPxE
- Location: Toledo, Ohio, Toledo Speedway
- Course: Permanent racing facility
- Course length: 0.80 km (.5 miles)
- Distance: 200 laps, 100 mi (160.934 km)
- Scheduled distance: 200 laps, 100 mi (160.934 km)
- Average speed: 80.178 miles per hour (129.034 km/h)

Pole position
Driver	Chandler Smith	Venturini Motorsports
- Time: 15.999

Most laps led
Driver	Chandler Smith	Venturini Motorsports
- Laps: 103

Winner
No. 21	Sam Mayer	GMS Racing

Television in the United States
- Network: MAVTV
- Announcers: Bob Dillner, Jim Tretow

Radio in the United States
- Radio: ARCA Racing Network

The 2020 Menards.com 200 Presented by SPxE was the ninth stock car race of the 2020 ARCA Menards Series, the fourth race of the 2020 Sioux Chief Showdown, and the first of two back-to-back races of the weekend. The race was held on Friday, July 31, 2020, in Toledo, Ohio, at Toledo Speedway, a 0.5 miles (0.80 km) permanent oval-shaped racetrack. The race took the scheduled 200 laps to complete. At race's end, Sam Mayer of GMS Racing would dominate the late stages of the race to win his first career ARCA Menards Series win and his first win of the season. To fill out the podium, Ty Gibbs of Joe Gibbs Racing and Taylor Gray of DGR-Crosley would finish second and third, respectively.

== Background ==
Toledo Speedway opened in 1960 and was paved in 1964. In 1978 it was sold to Thomas "Sonny" Adams Sr. The speedway was reacquired by ARCA in 1999. The track also features the weekly racing divisions of sportsman on the half-mile and Figure 8, factory stock, and four cylinders on a quarter-mile track inside the big track. They also have a series of races with outlaw-bodied late models that includes four 100-lap races and ends with Glass City 200. The track hosts the “Fastest short track show in the world” which features winged sprints and winged Super Modifieds on the half mile. Toledo also used to host a 200-lap late model race until its sale to ARCA in 1999.

Toledo is known for the foam blocks that line the race track, different than the concrete walls that line many short tracks throughout America. The crumbling walls can make track cleanup a tedious task for workers.

=== Entry list ===
#	Driver	Team	Make	Sponsor
4	Hailie Deegan	DGR-Crosley	Ford	Monster Energy
06	Tim Richmond	Wayne Peterson Racing	Toyota	Wayne Peterson Racing
10	Mike Basham	Fast Track Racing	Toyota	Fast Track Racing
11	Owen Smith	Fast Track Racing	Chevrolet	Fast Track Racing
12	Rick Clifton	Fast Track Racing	Toyota	Ashville Propane
15	Drew Dollar	Venturini Motorsports	Toyota	Sunbelt Rentals
17	Taylor Gray	DGR-Crosley	Ford	Ford Performance
18	Ty Gibbs	Joe Gibbs Racing	Toyota	Monster Energy
20	Chandler Smith	Venturini Motorsports	Toyota	JBL
21	Sam Mayer	GMS Racing	Chevrolet	Why Not You Foundation
22	Derek Griffith	Chad Bryant Racing	Ford	Original Gourmet Lollipops
23	Bret Holmes	Bret Holmes Racing	Chevrolet	Holmes II Excavating
25	Michael Self	Venturini Motorsports	Toyota	Sinclair
46	Thad Moffitt	DGR-Crosley	Ford	Performance Plus Motor Oil Richard Petty Signature Series
48	Brad Smith	Brad Smith Motorsports	Chevrolet	Home Building Solutions, NASCAR Low Teams
74	Giovanni Bromante	Visconti Motorsports	Chevrolet	Bromante Landscape and Design, Sandler Capital Management
Official entry list

== Practice ==
The only 45-minute practice session was held on Friday, July 31. Sam Mayer of GMS Racing would set the fastest time in the session, with a lap of 16.181 and an average speed of 111.242 miles per hour (179.027 km/h).

Pos.	#	Driver	Team	Make	Time	Speed
1	21	Sam Mayer	GMS Racing	Chevrolet	16.181	111.242
2	17	Taylor Gray	DGR-Crosley	Ford	16.203	111.091
3	4	Hailie Deegan	DGR-Crosley	Ford	16.253	110.749
Full practice results

== Qualifying ==
Qualifying was held on Friday, July 31, at 6:30 PM EST. Qualifying was a single car, two lap system where the first lap would determine the starting position for Friday's race, and the second lap would determine the starting position for Saturday's race.

Chandler Smith of Venturini Motorsports would win the pole, setting a time of 15.999 and an average speed of 112.507 miles per hour (181.062 km/h).

Pos.	#	Driver	Team	Make	Time	Speed
1	20	Chandler Smith	Venturini Motorsports	Toyota	15.999	112.507
2	18	Ty Gibbs	Joe Gibbs Racing	Toyota	16.037	112.240
3	17	Taylor Gray	DGR-Crosley	Ford	16.118	111.676
4	25	Michael Self	Venturini Motorsports	Toyota	16.127	111.614
5	21	Sam Mayer	GMS Racing	Chevrolet	16.144	111.497
6	15	Drew Dollar	Venturini Motorsports	Toyota	16.217	110.995
7	22	Derek Griffith	Chad Bryant Racing	Ford	16.220	110.974
8	4	Hailie Deegan	DGR-Crosley	Ford	16.246	110.797
9	23	Bret Holmes	Bret Holmes Racing	Chevrolet	16.248	110.783
10	74	Giovanni Bromante	Visconti Motorsports	Chevrolet	16.297	110.450
11	46	Thad Moffitt	DGR-Crosley	Ford	16.402	109.743
12	06	Tim Richmond	Wayne Peterson Racing	Toyota	17.482	102.963
13	10	Mike Basham	Fast Track Racing	Toyota	18.033	99.817
14	48	Brad Smith	Brad Smith Motorsports	Chevrolet	18.369	97.991
15	12	Rick Clifton	Fast Track Racing	Toyota	18.380	97.933
16	11	Owen Smith	Fast Track Racing	Chevrolet	19.062	94.429
Official qualifying results

== Race results ==
Fin	St	#	Driver	Team	Make	Laps	Led	Status	Pts
1	5	21	Sam Mayer	GMS Racing	Chevrolet	200	97	running	48
2	2	18	Ty Gibbs	Joe Gibbs Racing	Toyota	200	0	running	42
3	3	17	Taylor Gray	DGR-Crosley	Ford	200	0	running	41
4	9	23	Bret Holmes	Bret Holmes Racing	Chevrolet	200	0	running	40
5	4	25	Michael Self	Venturini Motorsports	Toyota	200	0	running	39
6	6	15	Drew Dollar	Venturini Motorsports	Toyota	200	0	running	38
7	7	22	Derek Griffith	Chad Bryant Racing	Ford	200	0	running	37
8	8	4	Hailie Deegan	DGR-Crosley	Ford	200	0	running	36
9	12	06	Tim Richmond	Wayne Peterson Racing	Toyota	189	0	running	35
10	15	12	Rick Clifton	Fast Track Racing	Toyota	174	0	running	34
11	1	20	Chandler Smith	Venturini Motorsports	Toyota	162	103	suspension	36
12	11	46	Thad Moffitt	DGR-Crosley	Ford	55	0	electrical	32
13	14	48	Brad Smith	Brad Smith Motorsports	Chevrolet	52	0	brakes	31
14	13	10	Mike Basham	Fast Track Racing	Toyota	15	0	vibration	30
15	10	74	Giovanni Bromante	Visconti Motorsports	Chevrolet	7	0	oil leak	29
16	16	11	Owen Smith	Fast Track Racing	Chevrolet	5	0	electrical	28
Official race results

Previous race: 2020 Dawn Ultra 150	ARCA Menards Series; 2020 season	Next race: 2020 Menards 200 presented by Crosley Brands
