= 2020 Bush's Beans 200 =

Race details
- Race 16 of 20 of the 2020 ARCA Menards Series; Race 5 of 6 of the 2020 ARCA Menards Series East; Race 9 of 10 of the 2020 Sioux Chief Showdown
- Date: September 17, 2020
- Official name: 2nd Annual Bush's Beans 200
- Location: Bristol, Tennessee, Bristol Motor Speedway
- Course: Permanent racing facility
- Course length: 0.858 km (0.533 miles)
- Distance: 200 laps, 106.6 mi (171.556 km)
- Scheduled distance: 200 laps, 106.6 mi (171.556 km)
- Average speed: 61.618 miles per hour (99.165 km/h)

Pole position
Driver	Ty Gibbs	Joe Gibbs Racing
- Time: Set by 2020 owner's points

Most laps led
Driver	Sam Mayer	GMS Racing
- Laps: 116

Winner
No. 21	Sam Mayer	GMS Racing

Television in the United States
- Network: Fox Sports 1
- Announcers: David Rieff, Phil Parsons

Radio in the United States
- Radio: Motor Racing Network

The 2020 Bush's Beans 200 was the 16th stock car race of the 2020 ARCA Menards Series, the fifth race of the 2020 ARCA Menards Series East, the ninth race of the 2020 Sioux Chief Showdown, and the second iteration of the event. The race was held on Thursday, September 17, 2020, in Bristol, Tennessee, at Bristol Motor Speedway, a 0.533 miles (0.858 km) permanent oval-shaped racetrack. The race took the scheduled 200 laps to complete. At race's end, Sam Mayer of GMS Racing would complete a Bristol sweep, after winning the 2020 UNOH 200 on the same day. Mayer would win his fifth career ARCA Menards Series win, his eighth career ARCA Menards Series East win, his fifth win of the season in the ARCA Menards Series, and his fourth win of the season in the ARCA Menards Series East. To fill out the podium, Ty Gibbs of Joe Gibbs Racing and Max McLaughlin of Hattori Racing Enterprises would finish second and third, respectively.

== Background ==
The Bristol Motor Speedway, formerly known as Bristol International Raceway and Bristol Raceway, is a NASCAR short track venue located in Bristol, Tennessee. Constructed in 1960, it held its first NASCAR race on July 30, 1961. Despite its short length, Bristol is among the most popular tracks on the NASCAR schedule because of its distinct features, which include extraordinarily steep banking, an all concrete surface, two pit roads, and stadium-like seating. It has also been named one of the loudest NASCAR tracks.

=== Entry list ===
#	Driver	Team	Make	Sponsor
0	Wayne Peterson	Wayne Peterson Racing	Chevrolet	Wayne Peterson Racing
1	Max McLaughlin	Hattori Racing Enterprises	Toyota	Mohawk Northeast, Inc.
4	Hailie Deegan	DGR-Crosley	Ford	Monster Energy
4E	Chase Cabre	Rev Racing	Toyota	Eibach, Honda Generators, Castle Packs Power
6	Nick Sanchez	Rev Racing	Toyota	Universal Technical Institute, NASCAR Technical Institute
06	Con Nicolopoulos	Wayne Peterson Racing	Toyota	Wayne Peterson Racing
10	Mike Basham	Fast Track Racing	Chevrolet	Fast Track Racing
11	Owen Smith	Fast Track Racing	Ford	Fast Track Racing
12	Kris Wright	Chad Bryant Racing	Chevrolet	Mastertech, FNB Corporation
15	Drew Dollar	Venturini Motorsports	Toyota	Sunbelt Rentals
17	Taylor Gray	DGR-Crosley	Ford	Ford Performance
18	Ty Gibbs	Joe Gibbs Racing	Toyota	Monster Energy
20	Chandler Smith	Venturini Motorsports	Toyota	JBL
21	Sam Mayer	GMS Racing	Chevrolet	Starr Children's Fund
22	Derek Griffith	Chad Bryant Racing	Ford	Original Gourmet Lollipops
23	Bret Holmes	Bret Holmes Racing	Chevrolet	Holmes II Excavating
25	Michael Self	Venturini Motorsports	Toyota	Sinclair
25E	Mason Diaz	Venturini Motorsports	Toyota	Solid Rock Carriers
32	Gus Dean	Win-Tron Racing	Chevrolet	Mashonit
41	Kyle Sieg	Cook-Finley Racing	Chevrolet	Night Owl Contractors
42	Parker Retzlaff	Cook-Finley Racing	Toyota	Ponsse, Trump 2020
48	Brad Smith	Brad Smith Motorsports	Chevrolet	Henshaw Automation
53E	Max Gutiérrez	Troy Williams Racing	Toyota	ToughBuilt
63	Dave Mader III	Spraker Racing Enterprises	Chevrolet	American Apparel, Diamond C Ranch
87	Chuck Buchanan Jr.*	Charles Buchanan Racing	Ford	Spring Drug
91	Justin Carroll	TC Motorsports	Toyota	Carroll's Automotive
97	Jason Kitzmiller	CR7 Motorsports	Chevrolet	A. L. L. Construction, Grant County Mulch
Official entry list

== Starting lineup ==
The starting lineup was determined by the current 2020 owner's points. As a result, Ty Gibbs of Joe Gibbs Racing would win the pole.

=== Full starting lineup ===
Pos.	#	Driver	Team	Make
1	18	Ty Gibbs	Joe Gibbs Racing	Toyota
2	21	Sam Mayer	GMS Racing	Chevrolet
3	20	Chandler Smith	Venturini Motorsports	Toyota
4	23	Bret Holmes	Bret Holmes Racing	Chevrolet
5	17	Taylor Gray	DGR-Crosley	Ford
6	42	Parker Retzlaff	Cook-Finley Racing	Toyota
7	25	Michael Self	Venturini Motorsports	Toyota
8	4	Hailie Deegan	DGR-Crosley	Ford
9	6	Nick Sanchez	Rev Racing	Toyota
10	15	Drew Dollar	Venturini Motorsports	Toyota
11	22	Derek Griffith	Chad Bryant Racing	Ford
12	4E	Chase Cabre	Rev Racing	Toyota
13	12	Kris Wright	Chad Bryant Racing	Chevrolet
14	11	Owen Smith	Fast Track Racing	Ford
15	25E	Mason Diaz	Venturini Motorsports	Toyota
16	10	Mike Basham	Fast Track Racing	Chevrolet
17	06	Con Nicolopoulos	Wayne Peterson Racing	Toyota
18	91	Justin Carroll	TC Motorsports	Toyota
19	48	Brad Smith	Brad Smith Motorsports	Chevrolet
20	1	Max McLaughlin	Hattori Racing Enterprises	Toyota
21	97	Jason Kitzmiller	CR7 Motorsports	Chevrolet
22	32	Gus Dean	Win-Tron Racing	Chevrolet
23	41	Kyle Sieg	Cook-Finley Racing	Chevrolet
24	0	Wayne Peterson	Wayne Peterson Racing	Chevrolet
25	63	Dave Mader III	Spraker Racing Enterprises	Chevrolet
26	53E	Max Gutiérrez	Troy Williams Racing	Toyota
Withdrew
WD	87	Chuck Buchanan Jr.	Charles Buchanan Racing	Ford
Official starting lineup

== Race results ==
Fin	St	#	Driver	Team	Make	Laps	Led	Status	Pts
1	2	21	Sam Mayer	GMS Racing	Chevrolet	200	116	running	48
2	1	18	Ty Gibbs	Joe Gibbs Racing	Toyota	200	53	running	43
3	20	1	Max McLaughlin	Hattori Racing Enterprises	Toyota	200	19	running	42
4	15	25E	Mason Diaz	Venturini Motorsports	Toyota	200	0	running	40
5	7	25	Michael Self	Venturini Motorsports	Toyota	200	9	running	40
6	8	4	Hailie Deegan	DGR-Crosley	Ford	200	0	running	38
7	5	17	Taylor Gray	DGR-Crosley	Ford	200	0	running	37
8	4	23	Bret Holmes	Bret Holmes Racing	Chevrolet	200	3	running	37
9	11	22	Derek Griffith	Chad Bryant Racing	Ford	200	0	running	35
10	18	91	Justin Carroll	TC Motorsports	Toyota	198	0	running	34
11	9	6	Nick Sanchez	Rev Racing	Toyota	198	0	running	33
12	22	32	Gus Dean	Win-Tron Racing	Chevrolet	195	0	running	32
13	21	97	Jason Kitzmiller	CR7 Motorsports	Chevrolet	192	0	running	31
14	26	53E	Max Gutiérrez	Troy Williams Racing	Toyota	189	0	running	30
15	13	12	Kris Wright	Chad Bryant Racing	Chevrolet	183	0	running	29
16	17	06	Con Nicolopoulos	Wayne Peterson Racing	Toyota	182	0	running	28
17	23	41	Kyle Sieg	Cook-Finley Racing	Chevrolet	180	0	running	27
18	10	15	Drew Dollar	Venturini Motorsports	Toyota	154	0	running	26
19	6	42	Parker Retzlaff	Cook-Finley Racing	Toyota	134	0	crash	25
20	25	63	Dave Mader III	Spraker Racing Enterprises	Chevrolet	131	0	overheating	24
21	12	4E	Chase Cabre	Rev Racing	Toyota	112	0	crash	23
22	14	11	Owen Smith	Fast Track Racing	Ford	97	0	engine	22
23	3	20	Chandler Smith	Venturini Motorsports	Toyota	71	0	sway bar	21
24	16	10	Mike Basham	Fast Track Racing	Chevrolet	34	0	brakes	20
25	19	48	Brad Smith	Brad Smith Motorsports	Chevrolet	33	0	electrical	19
26	24	0	Wayne Peterson	Wayne Peterson Racing	Chevrolet	2	0	electrical	18
Withdrew
WD		87	Chuck Buchanan Jr.	Charles Buchanan Racing	Ford				
Official race results

Previous race: 2020 Royal Truck & Trailer 200	ARCA Menards Series; 2020 season	Next race: 2020 Toyota 200 presented by Crosley Brands

Previous race: 2020 Royal Truck & Trailer 200	ARCA Menards Series East; 2020 season	Next race: 2020 Pensacola 200
