= Dave Mader III =

American racing driver (born 1955)

- Mader during driver intros at Daytona in 2022.
- Born: David George Mader III; June 30, 1955 (age 71); Maylene, Alabama, U.S.
- Achievements: 1985, 1986, 1987 & 1988 All-American Challenge Series Champion; 1978 Snowball Derby Winner

NASCAR Cup Series career
- 10 races run over 5 years
- Best finish: 45th (1992)
- First race: 1988 Busch 500 (Bristol)
- Last race: 1992 Coca-Cola 600 (Charlotte)
Wins	Top tens	Poles
0	0	0

NASCAR O'Reilly Auto Parts Series career
- 22 races run over 5 years
- Best finish: 30th (1990)
- First race: 1986 All Pro 300 (Charlotte)
- Last race: 1992 Atlanta 300 (Atlanta)
Wins	Top tens	Poles
0	9	2

NASCAR FedEx Freight Truck Series career
- 2 races run over 1 year
- Best finish: 84th (1998)
- First race: 1998 Federated Auto Parts 250 (Nashville)
- Last race: 1998 Memphis 200 (Memphis)
Wins	Top tens	Poles
0	0	0

ARCA Menards Series career
- 18 races run over 9 years
- ARCA no., team: No. 63 (Spraker Racing Enterprises)
- Best finish: 26th (1991)
- First race: 1983 Talladega ARCA 500 (Talladega)
- Last race: 2022 Lucas Oil 200 (Daytona)
- First win: 1991 Michigan ARCA 200 (Michigan)
Wins	Top tens	Poles
1	6	0

ARCA Menards Series East career
- 2 races run over 1 year
- Best finish: 17th (2020)
- First race: 2020 Bush's Beans 200 (Bristol)
- Last race: 2020 Pensacola 200 (Pensacola)
Wins	Top tens	Poles
0	0	0
- Statistics up to date as of February 26, 2021.

David George Mader III (born June 30, 1955) is an American professional stock car racing driver who last competed part-time in the ARCA Menards Series, driving the No. 63 Chevrolet SS for Spraker Racing Enterprises. He is a former competitor in all three of NASCAR's national touring series and is also the winner of the 1978 Snowball Derby.

== Racing career ==
Mader won the 1978 Snowball Derby, beating Mark Martin.

Mader competed in ten NASCAR Winston Cup Series races between 1988 and 1992, including leading seven laps at Martinsville Speedway in 1992. In the Busch Series, he raced in 22 events between 1986 and 1992, with nine top-ten finishes. He raced in two Craftsman Truck Series events in 1998.

In his career, Mader has raced Southern All Star, Sunoco, ASA, NASCAR Late Model Stock, All Pro, NASCAR All - American Challenge, ARCA, NASCAR Craftsman Truck Series, Winston Cup, and Busch Series. Mader won four consecutive championships in the All-American Challenge Series between 1985 and 1988. He also builds and manufactures his own race cars, helps various race teams as their crew chief, and has taught at Race Car College. He has accumulated 224 feature wins. He also competed in the 1992 running of The Winston, driving the No. 9 car which was in the race as a winning team, thanks to Bill Elliott winning in 1991.

In 2012, Mader was inducted into the Alabama Auto Racing Pioneers Hall of Fame.

=== ARCA Menards Series ===
Mader finished second in the ARCA Menards Series race at Talladega Superspeedway on April 24, 2021, his first top-five finish in thirty years. Mader's last top-five also came at Talladega, finishing second to Charlie Glotzbach. Mader has one career victory in ARCA, coming at Michigan in 1991. After a 24-year absence from the series, Mader returned in 2018.

== Personal life ==
Mader has five daughters, Tammy, Annette, Jennifer, Kelly, and Erica.

== Motorsports career results ==
=== NASCAR ===
(key) (Bold – Pole position awarded by qualifying time. Italics – Pole position earned by points standings or practice time. * – Most laps led.)

==== Winston Cup Series ====
NASCAR Winston Cup Series results
Year	Team	No.	Make	1	2	3	4	5	6	7	8	9	10	11	12	13	14	15	16	17	18	19	20	21	22	23	24	25	26	27	28	29	NWCC	Pts	Ref
1988	Bahre Racing	20	Pontiac	DAY	RCH	CAR	ATL	DAR	BRI	NWS	MAR	TAL	CLT	DOV	RSD	POC	MCH	DAY	POC	TAL	GLN	MCH	BRI; 24	DAR	RCH	DOV	MAR; DNQ	CLT	NWS	CAR	PHO	ATL; DNQ	72nd	91	
1989	Bahre Racing	20	Pontiac	DAY	CAR; 24	ATL	RCH	DAR	BRI	NWS	MAR	TAL; DNQ	CLT	DOV	SON	POC	MCH	DAY	POC	TAL	GLN	MCH	BRI	DAR	RCH	DOV	MAR	CLT	NWS	CAR	PHO	ATL	75th	91	
1990	Bahre Racing	65	Pontiac	DAY	RCH	CAR	ATL	DAR	BRI	NWS	MAR	TAL	CLT	DOV	SON	POC	MCH	DAY	POC	TAL	GLN	MCH	BRI	DAR	RCH	DOV	MAR	NWS	CLT; DNQ	CAR	PHO	ATL; 20	75th	103	
1991	Folsom Racing	65	Chevy	DAY; DNQ	RCH	CAR																											61st	137	
1991	Bahre Racing	65	Pontiac				ATL; 30	DAR; 33	BRI	NWS	MAR	TAL; DNQ	CLT	DOV	SON	POC																	61st	137	
1991	Bahre Racing	65	Chevy														MCH; DNQ	DAY	POC	TAL	GLN	MCH	BRI	DAR	RCH								61st	137	
1991	Mader Racing	65	Chevy																							DOV; DNQ	MAR; DNQ	NWS	CLT	CAR	PHO	ATL; DNQ	61st	137	
1992	Folsom Racing	13	Chevy	DAY; DNQ	CAR	RCH	ATL; QL^{†}																										45th	436	
1992	Melling Racing	9	Ford					DAR; 34	BRI; 16	NWS; DNQ	MAR; 21	TAL; 18	CLT; 39	DOV	SON	POC	MCH	DAY	POC	TAL	GLN	MCH	BRI	DAR	RCH	DOV	MAR	NWS	CLT	CAR	PHO	ATL	45th	436	
^{†} - Replaced by Bob Schacht

===== Daytona 500 =====
Year	Team	Manufacturer	Start	Finish
1991	Folsom Racing	Chevrolet	DNQ	
1992	Folsom Racing	Chevrolet	DNQ	

==== Busch Series ====
NASCAR Busch Series results
Year	Team	No.	Make	1	2	3	4	5	6	7	8	9	10	11	12	13	14	15	16	17	18	19	20	21	22	23	24	25	26	27	28	29	30	31	NBGNC	Pts	Ref
1986	Mader Racing	69	Olds	DAY	CAR	HCY	MAR	BRI	DAR	SBO	LGY	JFC	DOV	CLT	SBO	HCY	ROU	IRP	SBO	RAL	OXF	SBO	HCY	LGY	ROU	BRI	DAR	RCH	DOV	MAR	ROU	CLT; 16	CAR; 25	MAR	118th	0	
1987	Dennis Reno	44	Olds	DAY	HCY	MAR	DAR; 34	BRI	LGY	SBO	CLT; 23	DOV	IRP	ROU	JFC	OXF	SBO	HCY	RAL	LGY	ROU	BRI	JFC	DAR; 39	RCH	DOV	MAR	CLT; DNQ	CAR	MAR					48th	201	
1990	Speedway Motorsports	56	Buick	DAY	RCH	CAR	MAR	HCY	DAR	BRI	LAN	SBO	NZH	HCY	CLT	DOV	ROU	VOL; 30	MYB; 6	OXF	NHA; 35	SBO	DUB	IRP; 10	ROU	BRI; 11	DAR; 8	RCH; 13	DOV; 9	MAR; 10	CLT; 8	NHA; 37	**CAR**; 5	MAR	30th	1432	
1991	Speedway Motorsports	56	Buick	DAY	RCH	CAR	MAR	VOL	HCY	DAR	BRI	LAN; 9	SBO	NZH																					57th	360	
1991	Folsom Racing	23	Buick												CLT; 19	**DOV**; 29	ROU	HCY	MYB	GLN	OXF	NHA; 41	SBO	DUB	IRP	ROU	BRI	DAR	RCH	DOV	CLT; DNQ	NHA	CAR	MAR	57th	360	
1992	Speedway Motorsports	56	Buick	DAY	CAR	RCH	ATL; 6	MAR	DAR	BRI	HCY	LAN	DUB	NZH	CLT	DOV	ROU	MYB	GLN	VOL	NHA	TAL	IRP	ROU	MCH	NHA	BRI	DAR	RCH	DOV	CLT	MAR	CAR	HCY	87th	150	
1993	Three Star Motorsports	18	Chevy	DAY	CAR	RCH	DAR	BRI	HCY	ROU	MAR	NZH	CLT	DOV	MYB	GLN	MLW	TAL	IRP	MCH	NHA	BRI	DAR	RCH	DOV	ROU	CLT	MAR	CAR	HCY	ATL; QL^{†}				N/A	0	
1995				DAY	CAR	RCH	ATL	NSV	DAR	BRI	HCY	NHA	NZH	CLT	DOV	MYB	GLN	MLW	TAL	SBO	IRP	MCH	BRI	DAR	RCH	DOV	CLT; DNQ	CAR	HOM						N/A	0	
^{†} - Replaced by Phil Parsons

==== Craftsman Truck Series ====
NASCAR Craftsman Truck Series results
Year	Team	No.	Make	1	2	3	4	5	6	7	8	9	10	11	12	13	14	15	16	17	18	19	20	21	22	23	24	25	26	27	NCTC	Pts	Ref
1998	Raptor Performance Motorsports	1	Ford	WDW	HOM	PHO	POR	EVG	I70	GLN	TEX	BRI	MLW	NZH	CAL	PPR	IRP	NHA	FLM	NSV; 31	HPT	LVL	RCH								84th	128	
1998	Raptor Performance Motorsports	81	Ford																					MEM; 35	GTY	MAR	SON	MMR	PHO	LVS	84th	128	

=== ARCA Menards Series ===
(key) (Bold – Pole position awarded by qualifying time. Italics – Pole position earned by points standings or practice time. * – Most laps led.)

ARCA Menards Series results
Year	Team	No.	Make	1	2	3	4	5	6	7	8	9	10	11	12	13	14	15	16	17	18	19	20	21	AMSC	Pts	Ref
1983	Satterfield Racing	08	Buick	DAY	NSV	TAL; 36	LPR	LPR	ISF	IRP	SSP	FRS	BFS	WIN	LPR	POC	TAL	MCS	FRS	MIL	DSF	ZAN	SND		NA	0	
1989	White Brothers Racing	97	Pontiac	DAY; DNQ	ATL; 34	KIL	TAL	FRS	POC	KIL	HAG	POC	TAL	DEL	FRS	ISF	TOL	DSF	SLM	ATL					111th	-	
1991	Folsom Racing	11	Buick	DAY	ATL	KIL	TAL; 30*	TOL	FRS	POC	MCH; 1	KIL	FRS	DEL	POC; 2*	TAL; 2*	HPT	MCH	ISF	TOL	DSF	TWS	ATL; 23		26th	990	
1994	Reid Racing	05	Ford	DAY	TAL	FIF	LVL	KIL	TOL	FRS	MCH	DMS	POC	POC	KIL	FRS	INF	I70	ISF	DSF	TOL	SLM	WIN	ATL; 29	131st	335	
2018	Spraker Racing Enterprises	63	Chevy	DAY; 28	NSH	SLM	TAL; 16	TOL	CLT	POC	MCH; 18	MAD	GTW	CHI	IOW	ELK	POC	ISF	BLN	DSF	SLM	IRP	KAN		57th	380	
2019	Spraker Racing Enterprises	63	Chevy	DAY; 20	FIF	SLM	TAL	NSH	TOL	CLT	POC	MCH	MAD	GTW	CHI	ELK	IOW	POC	ISF	DSF	SLM	IRP	KAN		79th	130	
2020	Spraker Racing Enterprises	63	Chevy	DAY; 30	PHO	TAL	POC	IRP	KEN	IOW	KAN	TOL	TOL	MCH	DAY	GTW	L44	TOL	BRI; 20	WIN	MEM	ISF	KAN		55th	38	
2021	Spraker Racing Enterprises	63	Chevy	DAY; 27	PHO	TAL; 2	KAN	TOL	CLT; 8	MOH	POC	ELK	BLN	IOW	WIN	GLN	MCH	ISF	MLW	DSF	BRI	SLM	KAN		37th	95	
2022	Spraker Racing Enterprises	63	Chevy	DAY; 8	PHO	TAL	KAN	CLT	IOW	BLN	ELK	MOH	POC	IRP	MCH	GLN	ISF	MLW	DSF	KAN	BRI	SLM	TOL		81st	36	

==== ARCA Menards Series East ====
ARCA Menards Series East results
Year	Team	No.	Make	1	2	3	4	5	6	AMSEC	Pts	Ref
2020	Spraker Racing Enterprises	63	Chevy	NSM	TOL	DOV	TOL	BRI; 20	FIF; 11	17th	107	

=== CARS Super Late Model Tour ===
(key)

CARS Super Late Model Tour results
Year	Team	No.	Make	1	2	3	4	5	6	7	8	9	10	CSLMTC	Pts	Ref
2015	Paris Wilson	118	Chevy	SNM	ROU	HCY	SNM; 24	TCM; 16	MMS	ROU	CON	MYB	HCY	46th	26	

^{*} Season still in progress

Sporting positions
Preceded by Mike Alexander	NASCAR All-American Challenge Series Champion; 1985, 1986, 1987, 1988	Succeeded by Stanley Smith
Achievements
Preceded by Ronnie Sanders	Snowball Derby Winner; 1978	Succeeded by Freddy Fryar
