= D. L. Wilson =

American racing driver (born 1965)

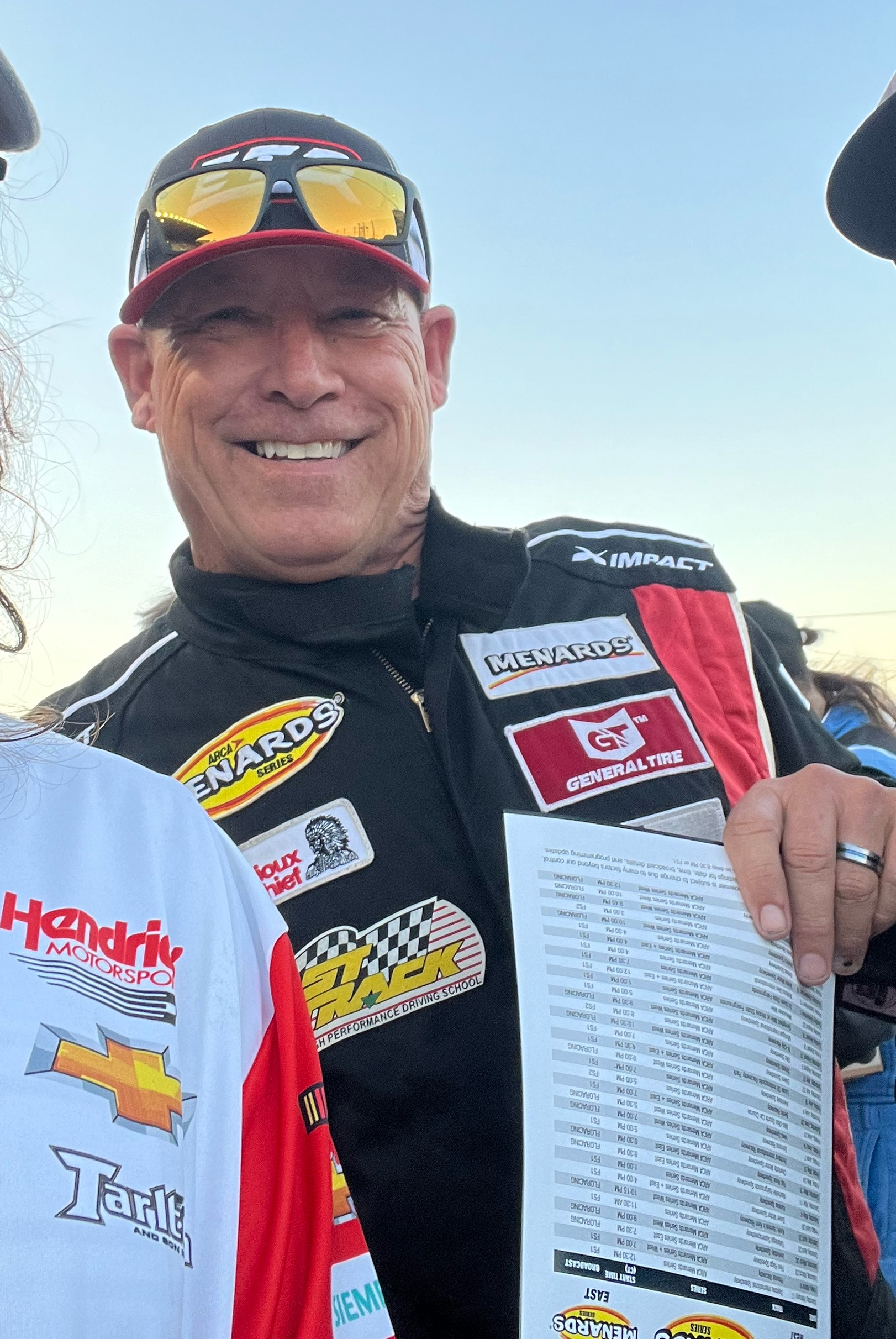
- Wilson at Nashville Fairgrounds Speedway in 2024
- Born: Donis Wilson; January 1, 1965 (age 61); Waco, Texas, U.S.

NASCAR FedEx Freight Truck Series career
- 2026 position: 126th
- Best finish: 126th (2026)
Wins	Top tens	Poles
0	0	0

ARCA Menards Series career
- 40 races run over 8 years
- Best finish: 6th (2021)
- First race: 2018 Music City 200 (Nashville Fairgrounds)
- Last race: 2026 Menards 150 (Kansas)
Wins	Top tens	Poles
0	1	0

ARCA Menards Series East career
- 17 races run over 6 years
- Best finish: 5th (2024)
- First race: 2020 Pensacola 200 (Pensacola)
- Last race: 2025 Music City 150 (Nashville Fairgrounds)
Wins	Top tens	Poles
0	3	0

ARCA Menards Series West career
- 3 races run over 3 years
- Best finish: 59th (2021)
- First race: 2021 General Tire 150 (Phoenix)
- Last race: 2023 General Tire 150 (Phoenix)
Wins	Top tens	Poles
0	0	0
- Statistics up to date as of November 6, 2026.

Donis "D. L." Wilson (born January 1, 1965) is an American professional stock car racing driver. He last competed part-time in the NASCAR Craftsman Truck Series, driving the No. 93 Chevrolet Silverado RST for Costner Motorsports, and part-time in the ARCA Menards Series, driving the No. 01/11 Ford for Fast Track Racing.

== Racing career ==
=== NASCAR Craftsman Truck Series ===
On August 6, 2026, it was announced that Wilson would drive the No. 93 Chevrolet for Costner Motorsports at New Hampshire, although he failed to qualify.

=== ARCA Menards Series ===
Wilson would get his start in the series in 2017 with Fast Track Racing for a test session, after a deal with another team failed to materialize.

Wilson would get his debut in 2018 at Nashville Fairgrounds Speedway, retiring and finishing 25th due to ignition problems. Since then, he has made at least one start in every season since then, with him greatly expanding his schedule in 2021, racing fourteen of the twenty races that year. Wilson would get his first top-ten at the 2021 Allen Crowe 100, finishing tenth.

== Political career ==
Wilson would try and run as a Republican for McLennan County Commissioner, second precinct in 2018. Wilson would try and push for a better mental health system and drug system to stop drugs, along with a campaign for better roads in the local area. In the Republican primary, he would win, receiving 1,116 votes, or 64.36% of the votes cast. He would face off against Democrat Patricia Chisolm-Miller. Wilson would lose the election, only earning 4,573 votes, or 43% of the ballots compared to Chisolm-Miller's 6,016 votes, or 57% of the ballots. Wilson would blame Democrat straight-ticket voting for the reason of his loss.

=== Electoral history ===
==== 2018 ====
2018 McKennan County Commissioner Precinct 2 Republican Primary
Party	Candidate	Votes	%
Republican	D. L. Wilson	1,116	64.36%
Republican	Vernon Davis	411	23.7%
Republican	Gina Ford	207	11.94%

2018 McKennan County Commissioner Precinct 2 election
Party	Candidate	Votes	%
Democratic	Patricia Chisolm-Miller	6,016	57%
Republican	D. L. Wilson	4,573	43%

== Personal life ==
For 21 years, Wilson would work for the Texas Department of Public Safety.

== Motorsports career results ==
=== NASCAR ===
(key) (Bold – Pole position awarded by qualifying time. Italics – Pole position earned by points standings or practice time. * – Most laps led.)

==== Craftsman Truck Series ====
NASCAR Craftsman Truck Series results
Year	Team	No.	Make	1	2	3	4	5	6	7	8	9	10	11	12	13	14	15	16	17	18	19	20	21	22	23	24	25	NCTS	Pts	Ref
2026	Costner Motorsports	93	Chevy	DAY	ATL	STP	DAR	ROC	BRI	TEX	GLN	DOV	CLT	NSH	MCH	COR	LRP	NWS	IRP	RCH	NHA; DNQ	BRI	KAN	CLT	PHO	TAL	MAR	HOM	126th	0	

=== ARCA Menards Series ===
(key) (Bold – Pole position awarded by qualifying time. Italics – Pole position earned by points standings or practice time. * – Most laps led.)

ARCA Menards Series results
Year	Team	No.	Make	1	2	3	4	5	6	7	8	9	10	11	12	13	14	15	16	17	18	19	20	AMSC	Pts	Ref
2018	Fast Track Racing	11	Chevy	DAY	NSH; 25	SLM																		71st	265	
2018	Fast Track Racing	10	Chevy				TAL; 19	TOL	CLT	POC	MCH	MAD	GTW	CHI	IOW	ELK	POC	ISF	BLN	DSF	SLM			71st	265	
2018	Fast Track Racing	1	Toyota																			IRP; Wth	KAN	71st	265	
2019	Fast Track Racing	11	Toyota	DAY	FIF	SLM	TAL; 17	NSH	TOL	CLT	POC	MCH	MAD	GTW	CHI	ELK	IOW	POC	ISF	DSF	SLM	IRP	KAN	72nd	145	
2020	Fast Track Racing	12	Chevy	DAY	PHO	TAL	POC	IRP	KEN	IOW	KAN	TOL	TOL	MCH	DAY	GTW	L44	TOL	BRI	WIN	MEM; 16	ISF	KAN	77th	28	
2021	Fast Track Racing	12	Toyota	DAY; 26		TAL; 19	KAN; 11	TOL; 12	CLT; 23	MOH	POC	ELK	BLN				MCH; 19	ISF; 10	MLW		BRI; 28	SLM		6th	464	
2021	Fast Track Racing	12	Chevy		PHO; 20										WIN; 12					DSF; 11				6th	464	
2021	Fast Track Racing	10	Chevy											IOW; 16										6th	464	
2021	Fast Track Racing	01	Toyota													GLN; 27								6th	464	
2021	Fast Track Racing	01	Chevy																				KAN; 18	6th	464	
2022	Fast Track Racing	12	Chevy	DAY; 23	PHO; 24	TAL; 16	KAN; 12	CLT	IOW; 19				POC; 25		MCH; 13	GLN	ISF	MLW	DSF	KAN	BRI; 18	SLM	TOL	14th	314	
2022	Fast Track Racing	01	Toyota							BLN; 15														14th	314	
2022	Fast Track Racing	01	Chevy								ELK; 19													14th	314	
2022	Fast Track Racing	01	Ford									MOH; 21												14th	314	
2022	Fast Track Racing	12	Toyota											IRP; 19										14th	314	
2023	Fast Track Racing	12	Chevy	DAY	PHO; 24	TAL	KAN	CLT	BLN	ELK	MOH	IOW	POC	MCH										49th	77	
2023	Fast Track Racing	12	Toyota												IRP; 15	GLN	ISF	MLW	DSF	KAN				49th	77	
2023	Fast Track Racing	10	Toyota																		BRI; 16	SLM	TOL	49th	77	
2024	CW Motorsports	39	Toyota	DAY	PHO	TAL	DOV; 11	KAN	CLT	IOW; 12	MOH	BLN	IRP; 16	SLM	ELK	MCH	ISF	MLW; 14	DSF	GLN	BRI; 23	KAN	TOL	34th	144	
2026	Fast Track Racing	01	Ford	DAY	PHO	KAN; 24	TAL	GLN	TOL	MCH	POC	BER	ELK	CHI	LRP	IRP	IOW	ISF	MAD	DSF	SLM	BRI		70th	52	
2026	Fast Track Racing	11	Ford																				KAN; 12	70th	52	

==== ARCA Menards Series East ====
ARCA Menards Series East results
Year	Team	No.	Make	1	2	3	4	5	6	7	8	AMSEC	Pts	Ref
2020	Fast Track Racing	11	Chevy	NSM	TOL	DOV	TOL	BRI	FIF; 19			26th	75	
2021	Fast Track Racing	10	Chevy	NSM	FIF	NSV	DOV	SNM	IOW	MLW; 16		31st	44	
2021	Fast Track Racing	12	Toyota								BRI; 28	31st	44	
2022	Fast Track Racing	12	Toyota	NSM	FIF	DOV	NSV	IOW; 19	MLW			35th	51	
2022	Fast Track Racing	12	Chevy							BRI; 18		35th	51	
2023	Fast Track Racing	12	Toyota	FIF	DOV	NSV	FRS	IOW	IRP; 15	MLW		28th	57	
2023	Fast Track Racing	10	Toyota								BRI; 16	28th	57	
2024	CW Motorsports	39	Toyota	FIF; 9	DOV; 11	NSV; 10	FRS; 9	IOW; 12	IRP; 16	MLW; 14	BRI; 23	5th	348	
2025	CW Motorsports	39	Toyota	FIF; 12	CAR							38th	63	
2025	Fast Track Racing	10	Toyota			NSV; 13	FRS	DOV	IRP	IOW	BRI	38th	63	

==== ARCA Menards Series West ====
ARCA Menards Series West results
Year	Team	No.	Make	1	2	3	4	5	6	7	8	9	10	11	12	AMSWC	Pts	Ref
2021	Fast Track Racing	12	Chevy	PHO; 20	SON	IRW	CNS	IRW	PIR	LVS	AAS	PHO				59th	24	
2022	Fast Track Racing	12	Chevy	PHO; 24	IRW	KCR	PIR	SON	IRW	EVG	PIR	AAS	LVS	PHO		64th	20	
2023	Fast Track Racing	12	Chevy	PHO; 24	IRW	KCR	PIR	SON	IRW	SHA	EVG	AAS	LVS	MAD	PHO	68th	20	
