= Giovanni Bromante =

American racing driver

- Born: August 9, 2003 (age 23); Locust Valley, New York, U.S.

ARCA Menards Series career
- 1 race run over 1 year
- Best finish: 74th (2020)
- First race: 2020 Menards.com 200 Presented by SPxE (Toledo)
Wins	Top tens	Poles
0	0	0

ARCA Menards Series East career
- 2 races run over 1 year
- Best finish: 27th (2020)
- First race: 2020 Skip's Western Outfitters 175 (New Smyrna)
- Last race: 2020 Herr's Potato Chips 200 (Toledo)
Wins	Top tens	Poles
0	1	0
- Statistics up to date as of January 31, 2025.

Giovanni Bromante (born August 9, 2003) is an American professional stock car racing driver who has competed in the ARCA Menards Series and the ARCA Menards Series East.

Bromante has also previously competed in series such as the ASA CRA Super Series, the ASA Southern Super Series, the CARS Super Late Model Tour, and the World Series of Asphalt Stock Car Racing.

== Motorsports results ==
=== ARCA Menards Series ===
(key) (Bold – Pole position awarded by qualifying time. Italics – Pole position earned by points standings or practice time. * – Most laps led.)

ARCA Menards Series results
Year	Team	No.	Make	1	2	3	4	5	6	7	8	9	10	11	12	13	14	15	16	17	18	19	20	AMSC	Pts	Ref
2020	Visconti Motorsports	74	Chevy	DAY	PHO	TAL	POC	IRP	KEN	IOW	KAN	TOL; 15	TOL	MCH	DRC	GTW	I44	TOL	BRI	WIN	MEM	ISF	KAN	74th	29	

==== ARCA Menards Series East ====
ARCA Menards Series East results
Year	Team	No.	Make	1	2	3	4	5	6	AMSEC	Pts	Ref
2020	Visconti Motorsports	74	Chevy	NSM; 5	TOL; 11	DOV	TOL	BRI	FIF; Wth	27th	72	

=== CARS Super Late Model Tour ===
(key)

CARS Super Late Model Tour results
Year	Team	No.	Make	1	2	3	4	5	6	7	8	CSLMTC	Pts	Ref
2019	Anthony Campi	81	Toyota	SNM	HCY	NSH; 8	MMS	BRI; 18	HCY	ROU; 3	SBO	26th	31	
2021	Anthony Campi	81	Chevy	HCY	GPS	NSH	JEN	HCY	MMS; 4	TCM	SBO	21st	29	
