= 2020 ARCA Menards Series East =

34th season of the NASCAR K&N Pro Series East

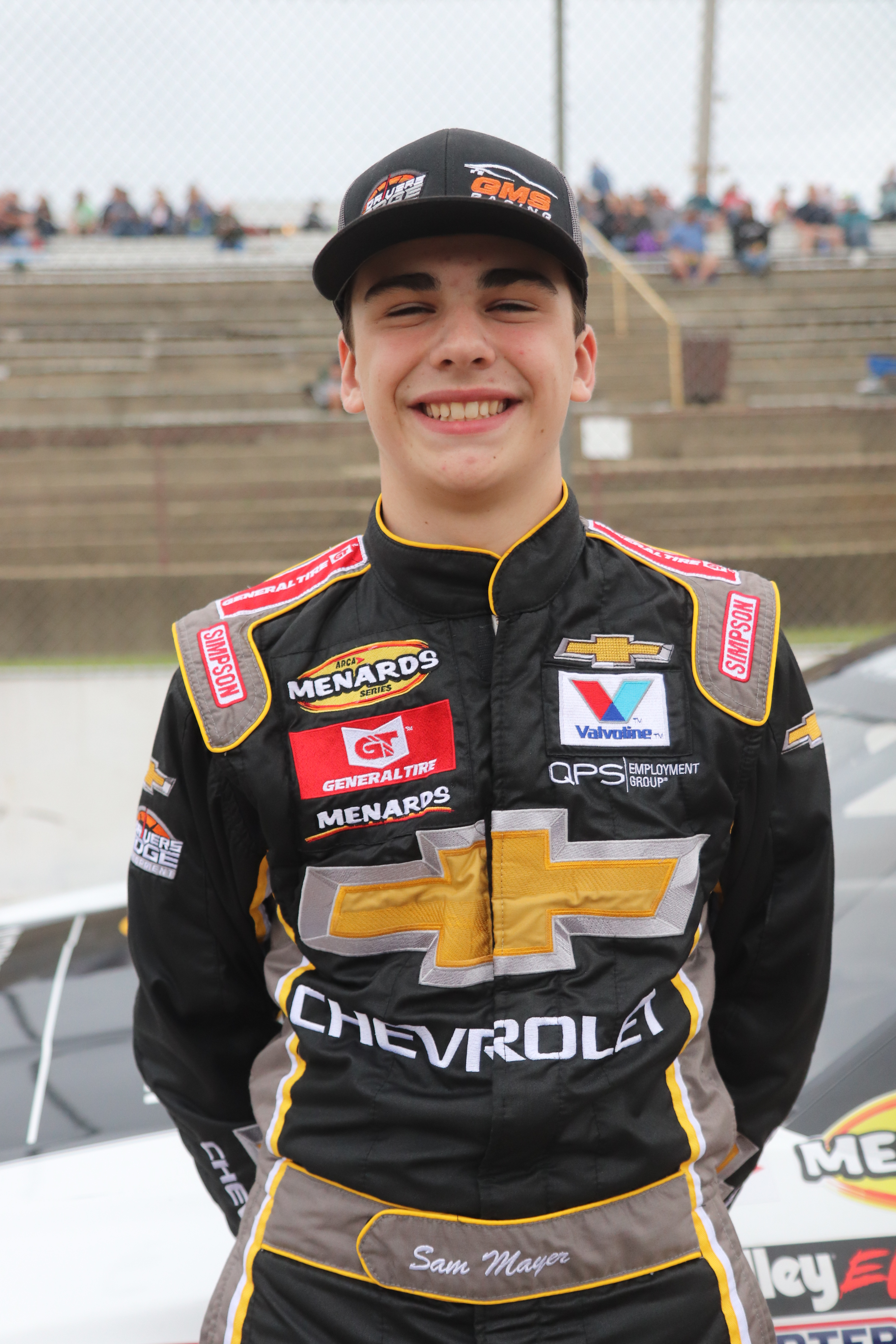
Sam Mayer won his second consecutive championship in 2020.

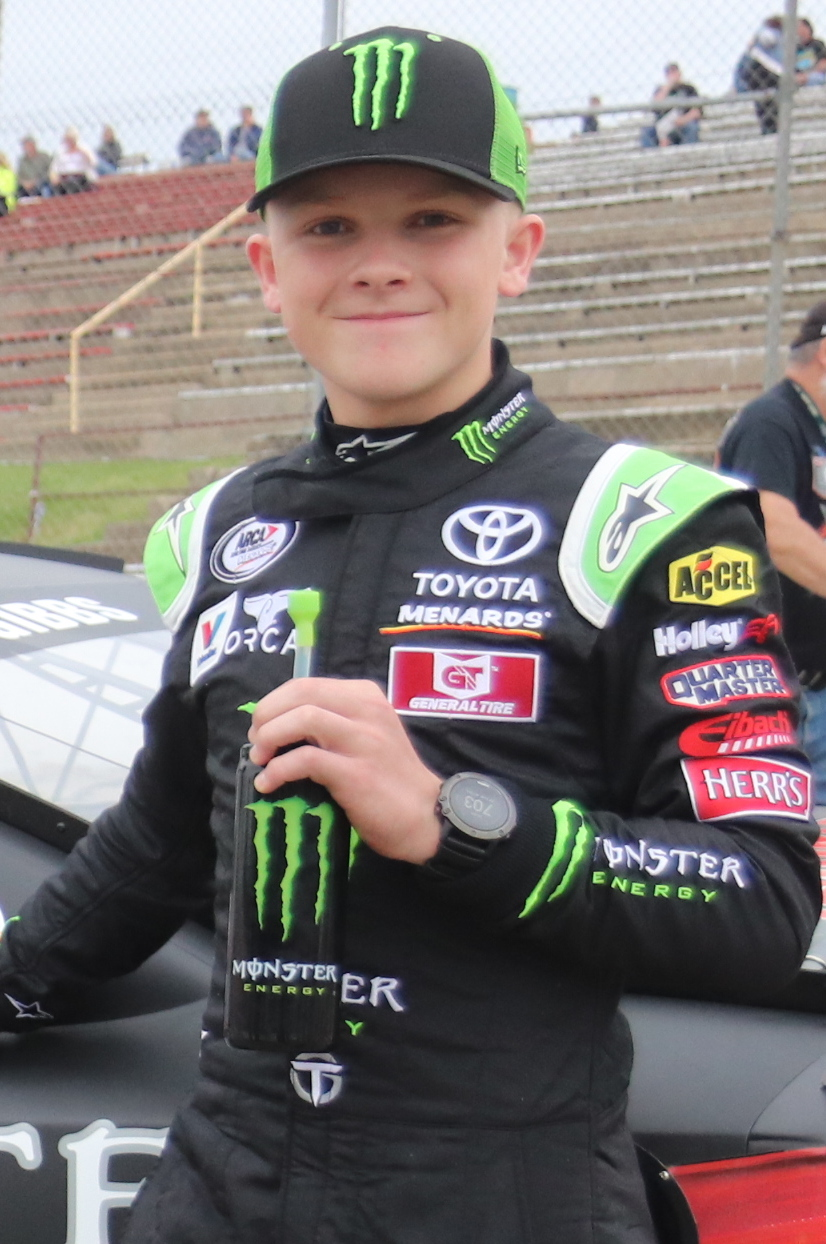
Ty Gibbs finished second behind Mayer in the championship by 32 points.

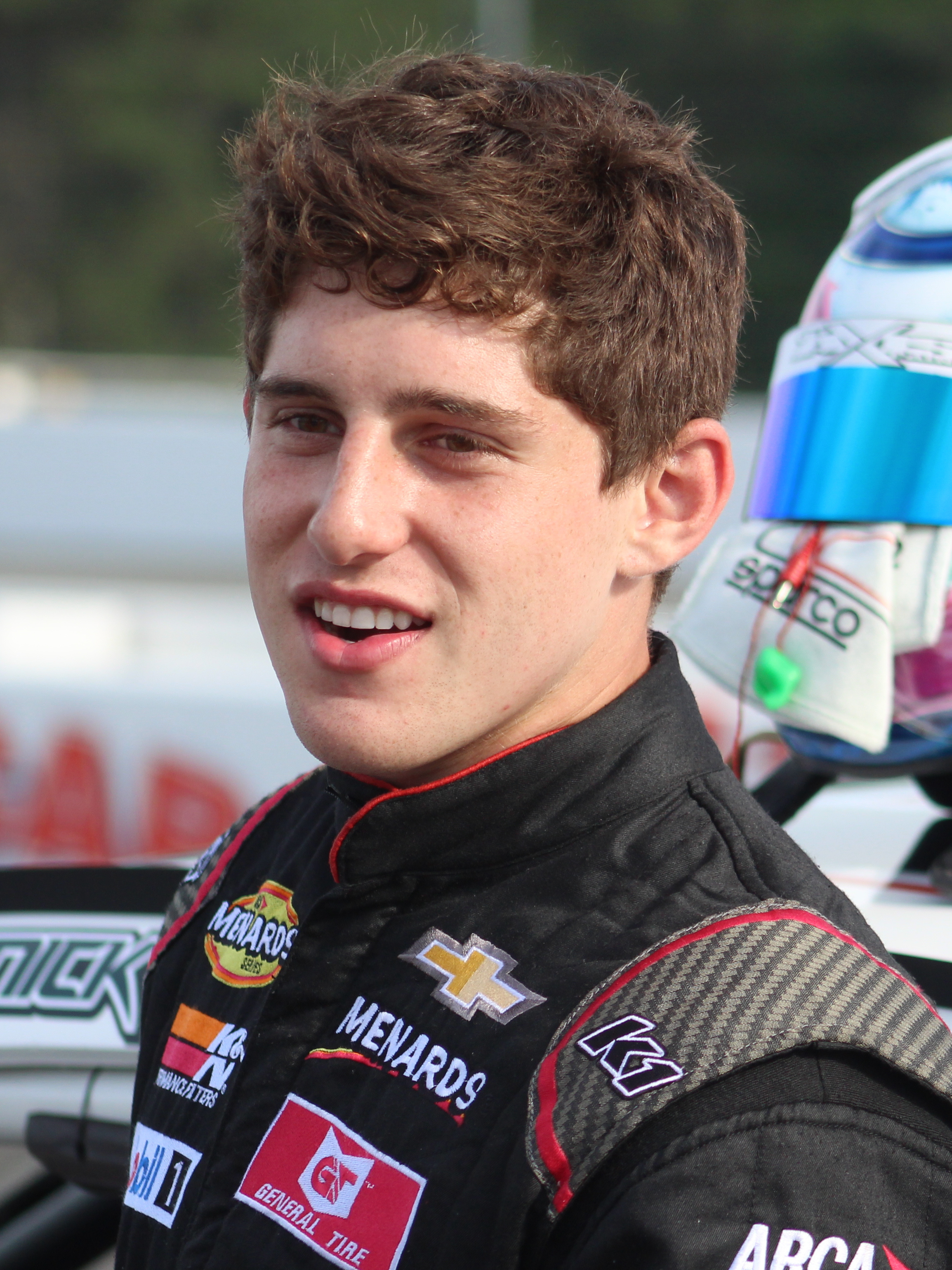
Nick Sanchez finished third in the championship.

The 2020 ARCA Menards Series East was the 34th season of the ARCA Menards Series East, a regional stock car racing series sanctioned by NASCAR. It began on February 10 at New Smyrna Speedway with the Skip's Western Outfitters 175, and concluded on October 11 at Five Flags Speedway with the Pensacola 200. 2020 marked the first season the series was known as the ARCA Menards Series East, after it was known as the NASCAR K&N Pro Series East for the previous ten years.

Sam Mayer entered the season as the defending champion, and won all but one race to score his second consecutive championship in the series.

When the season was put on hold due to the COVID-19 pandemic, drivers from all NASCAR series, including a few ARCA drivers, participated in the inaugural eNASCAR iRacing Pro Invitational Series during that time.

== Teams and drivers ==
=== Complete schedule ===
Manufacturer	Team	No.	Driver	Crew chief
Chevrolet	GMS Racing	21	Sam Mayer	Mardy Lindley
Ford	DGR-Crosley	17	Tanner Gray 1	Blake Bainbridge
Ford	DGR-Crosley	17	Taylor Gray (R) 5	Blake Bainbridge
Toyota	Cook-Finley Racing	42	Parker Retzlaff	Charles Hoffmeyer 2 Sean Samuels 4
Toyota	Joe Gibbs Racing	18	Ty Gibbs (R)	Mark McFarland
Toyota	Rev Racing	4	Chase Cabre	Glenn Parker
Toyota	Rev Racing	6	Nick Sanchez (R)	Steve Plattenberger
Toyota	TC Motorsports	91	Justin Carroll	Terry Carroll 1 Jim Long 5
Toyota	Venturini Motorsports	20	Corey Heim 3	Shannon Rursch 2 Billy Venturini 4
Toyota	Venturini Motorsports	20	Ryan Repko 1	Shannon Rursch 2 Billy Venturini 4
Toyota	Venturini Motorsports	20	Chandler Smith 2	Shannon Rursch 2 Billy Venturini 4
Toyota	Venturini Motorsports	25	Mason Diaz	Kevin Reed 4 Dave Leiner Jr. 2
Toyota 3 Ford 2 Chevrolet 1	Fast Track Racing	11	Chuck Hiers 1	Mike Sroufe 2 Andy Hillenburg 1
Toyota 3 Ford 2 Chevrolet 1	Fast Track Racing	11	Mike Basham 1	Mike Sroufe 2 Andy Hillenburg 1
Toyota 3 Ford 2 Chevrolet 1	Fast Track Racing	11	Ed Pompa 1	Mike Sroufe 2 Andy Hillenburg 1
Toyota 3 Ford 2 Chevrolet 1	Fast Track Racing	11	Rick Clifton 1	Trey Galgon
Toyota 3 Ford 2 Chevrolet 1	Fast Track Racing	11	Owen Smith 1	Trey Galgon
Toyota 3 Ford 2 Chevrolet 1	Fast Track Racing	11	D. L. Wilson 1	Trey Galgon

=== Limited schedule ===
Manufacturer	Team	No.	Driver	Crew chief	Rounds
Chevrolet	Ben Kennedy Racing	43	Daniel Dye	Glenn Garrison	2
Chevrolet	Brad Smith Motorsports	48	Brad Smith	John Ward 1 Jeff Smith 1 Leo Kryger 1 Carlos Leon 1	4
Chevrolet	Bret Holmes Racing	23	Bret Holmes	Shane Huffman	3
Chevrolet	Chad Bryant Racing	12	Kris Wright	Donnie Richeson	1
Chevrolet	Connor Okrzesik Racing	14	Connor Okrzesik	Jeff McClure	1
Chevrolet	Cook-Finley Racing (Note: Entry was fielded in a collaboration with RSS Racing.)	41	Kyle Sieg	Charles Hoffmeyer 1 Amber Slagle 1	2
Chevrolet	CR7 Motorsports	97	Jason Kitzmiller	Todd Myers	2
Chevrolet	Finney Racing Enterprises	80	Brian Finney	Wally Finney	1
Chevrolet	Robert Pawlowski Racing	11	Robert Pawlowski	Aaron Brown 2 Ron Otto 1	3
Chevrolet	Spraker Racing Enterprises	63	Dave Mader III	Jeff Spraker	2
Chevrolet	Wayne Peterson Racing	0	Wayne Peterson	Michael Peterson	1
Chevrolet	Win-Tron Racing	32	Gus Dean	Jamie Jones	1
Chevrolet	Visconti Motorsports	74	Giovanni Bromante (R)	Steven Keller	2
Ford	Visconti Motorsports	74	Joe Graf Jr.	Steven Keller	1
Ford	Chad Bryant Racing	22	Derek Griffith (R)	Chad Bryant 1 Paul Andrews 2	3
Ford	Chad Bryant Racing	77	Grant Enfinger	Chad Bryant	1
Ford	Charles Buchanan Racing	87	Chuck Buchanan Jr.	Craig Wood	1
Ford	DGR-Crosley	4	Hailie Deegan	Seth Smith	2
Ford	DGR-Crosley	54	David Gilliland	Derek Smith	1
Ford	Mullins Racing	3	Willie Mullins	Tony Furr	1
Ford	Rette Jones Racing	30	Tristan Van Wieringen (R)	Mark Rette	1
Toyota	Bill McAnally Racing	16	Gio Scelzi	John Camilleri	1
Toyota	Bill McAnally Racing	19	Jesse Love	Kyle Wolosek	1
Toyota	Bill McAnally Racing	50	Holley Hollan	Henry Nascimento	1
Toyota	Bill McAnally Racing	99	Gracie Trotter	Roger Bracken	1
Toyota	Fast Track Racing	12	Mike Basham	Mike Sroufe	1
Toyota	Hattori Racing Enterprises	1	Max McLaughlin	Dan Stillman 1 Dave McCarty 3	4
Toyota	Jett Motorsports	09	Stephen Nasse	Chris Tater	1
Toyota	Venturini Motorsports	15	Drew Dollar	Shannon Rursch	3
Toyota	Venturini Motorsports	15	Jesse Love	Shannon Rursch	1
Toyota	Venturini Motorsports	25	Michael Self	Kevin Reed	2
Toyota	Troy Williams Racing	53	Max Gutiérrez	Troy Williams	2
Toyota	Wayne Peterson Racing	06	Tim Richmond	Brad Frye	1
Toyota	Wayne Peterson Racing	06	Con Nicolopoulos	Brad Frye	1
Chevrolet 3 Ford 1	Fast Track Racing	10	Tommy Vigh Jr.	Dick Doheny	1
Chevrolet 3 Ford 1	Fast Track Racing	10	Owen Smith	Tim Monroe	1
Chevrolet 3 Ford 1	Fast Track Racing	10	Mike Basham	Mike Sroufe	1
Chevrolet 3 Ford 1	Fast Track Racing	10	Richard Garvie	Mike Sroufe	1

=== Changes ===
==== Teams ====
- Perennial ARCA Menards Series team Venturini Motorsports entered the series in advance of the 2020 season.
- Cook-Finley Racing announced an entry with Parker Retzlaff as the driver of the No. 42.

==== Drivers ====
- On November 20, 2019, it was announced that Nick Sanchez would be driving full-time and for rookie of the year in the East Series for Rev Racing in 2020.
- On December 11, 2019, it was announced that Giovanni Bromante would drive full-time for Visconti Motorsports, running for rookie of the year in the No. 74 car.
- On December 14, 2019, it was announced that Mason Diaz would drive the Venturini Motorsports car for the full season as part of the team's expansion into the East Series.
- On December 16, 2019, it was announced that Tanner Gray would be moving up to the Truck Series full-time with DGR-Crosley, who he had driven for full-time in 2019 in the East Series in their No. 15 car. However, he ran a part-time schedule of races in ARCA East in 2020.
- On December 18, 2019, it was announced that Taylor Gray would run full-time and for rookie of the year in the No. 17 for DGR-Crosley in all races after he turned 15 on March 25, 2020.
- On January 16, 2020, it was announced that Corey Heim would be driving in three races for Venturini Motorsports.
- On January 30, 2020, it was announced that Parker Retzlaff would be driving the No. 42 for Cook-Finley Racing part-time with the possibility of a full season. He drove the No. 74 Visconti Motorsports entry part-time in 2019.
- On February 6, 2020, Rette Jones Racing announced that Tristan Van Wieringen would drive the No. 30 full-time and for rookie of the year with the team. However, due to the financial impact after COVID-19, the team ran select races instead of full-time.
- On February 7, 2020, it was announced that Daniel Dye would be making his series debut in the East Series at New Smyrna Speedway, driving for Ben Kennedy in his No. 43. Dye was also scheduled to run select races in 2020.
- On March 10, 2020, it was announced that Derek Griffith would be running the full season and for rookie of the year with Chad Bryant Racing in the team's No. 2 car. However, due to the financial impact after COVID-19, the team ran select races instead of full-time, even though Griffith would run a second car, the 22.

==== Manufacturers ====
- On December 11, 2019, DGR-Crosley announced a switch from Toyota to Ford beginning in 2020.

== Schedule ==
On November 6, 2019, NASCAR released the schedule for the 2020 season. As part of the unification of the former K&N East and West series with the ARCA Menards Series, the schedule decreased from fourteen races in 2019 to eight races in 2020. The number of races was originally seven, however, an additional race at Fairgrounds Speedway was announced on December 14, 2019.

The races at Memphis International Raceway, Iowa Speedway, Watkins Glen International as well as Bristol Motor Speedway's second race were taken and moved from the East Series schedule to the ARCA Menards Series schedule. New Hampshire Motor Speedway, which had two East Series races in 2019, retained only one race in 2020. Five Flags Speedway, Fairgrounds Speedway and Toledo Speedway were added to the East Series schedule, moving over from the ARCA schedule. Berlin Raceway, which hosted an East Series race in 2017, was added back. The races at South Boston Speedway and World Wide Technology Raceway were completely dropped from the schedule.

NBCSN carried television coverage of all races on a tape-delay basis.

No.	Race title	Track	Date
1	Skip's Western Outfitters 175	New Smyrna Speedway, New Smyrna Beach, Florida	February 10
2	Herr's Potato Chips 200 presented by Federated Car Care	Toledo Speedway, Toledo, Ohio	June 13
3	General Tire 125	Dover International Speedway, Dover, Delaware	August 21
4	Royal Truck & Trailer 200	Toledo Speedway, Toledo, Ohio	September 12
5	Bush's Beans 200	Bristol Motor Speedway, Bristol, Tennessee	September 17
6	Pensacola 200 presented by Inspectra Thermal Solutions	Five Flags Speedway, Pensacola, Florida	October 11 (Note: The Five Flags race was postponed from Saturday, October 10 to Sunday, October 11, due to Hurricane Delta.)

- Races highlighted in gold are combination events with the ARCA Menards Series.

=== Schedule changes due to the COVID-19 pandemic ===
The event at Five Flags Speedway, originally scheduled for March 14, was postponed to October 10 due to the COVID-19 pandemic. On August 25, 2020, series officials announced the cancellation of races at Berlin Raceway and New Hampshire Motor Speedway and replaced them with a date at Toledo Speedway, which served as a combination race with the ARCA Menards Series. The race at Fairgrounds Speedway was also cancelled.

== Results and standings ==
=== Races ===
No.	Race	Pole Position	Most laps led	Winning driver	Manufacturer	No.	Winning team
1	Skip's Western Outfitters 175	Derek Griffith	Derek Griffith	Sam Mayer	Chevrolet	21	GMS Racing
2	Herr's Potato Chips 200 presented by Federated Car Care	Sam Mayer	Ty Gibbs	Ty Gibbs	Toyota	18	Joe Gibbs Racing
3	General Tire 125	Ty Gibbs	Ty Gibbs	Sam Mayer	Chevrolet	21	GMS Racing
4	Royal Truck & Trailer 200	Sam Mayer	Sam Mayer	Sam Mayer	Chevrolet	21	GMS Racing
5	Bush's Beans 200	Ty Gibbs	Sam Mayer	Sam Mayer	Chevrolet	21	GMS Racing
6	Pensacola 200 presented by Inspectra Thermal Solutions	Grant Enfinger	Grant Enfinger	Sam Mayer	Chevrolet	21	GMS Racing

=== Drivers' championship ===
Note: The pole-winner also receives one bonus point, similar to the previous ARCA points system used until 2019 and unlike NASCAR.

(key) Bold – Pole position awarded by time. Italics – Pole position set by final practice results or rainout. * – Most laps led.

Pos	Driver	NSM	TOL	DOV	TOL	BRI	FIF	Points
1	Sam Mayer	1	**2**	1	**1***	1*	1	382
2	Ty Gibbs **(R)**	3	1*	**12***	3	2	3	350
3	Nick Sanchez **(R)**	4	5	16	10	11	9	309
4	Parker Retzlaff	8	7	7	8	19	10	305
5	Mason Diaz	17	14	3	9	4	16	301
6	Justin Carroll	21	6	14	11	10	8	294
7	Chase Cabre	9	4	8	16	21	14	292
8	Taylor Gray **(R)**		8	9	5	7	4	237
9	Corey Heim	7		6			2	167
10	Derek Griffith **(R)**	**2***				9	13	161
11	Brad Smith		15		17	25	18	151
12	Max McLaughlin	10	12	4		3		148
13	Jesse Love	12					6	120
14	Bret Holmes		3		4	8		118
15	Daniel Dye	19					7	112
16	Max Gutiérrez					14	12	112
17	Dave Mader III					20	11	107
18	Drew Dollar			5	15	18		94
19	Grant Enfinger						**5***	92
20	Robert Pawlowski	23	10		14			85
21	Mike Basham		13		12	24		83
22	Richard Garvie						15	79
23	Michael Self				7	5		77
24	Connor Okrzesik						17	77
25	Hailie Deegan				6	6		76
26	D. L. Wilson						19	75
27	Giovanni Bromante **(R)**	5	11					72
28	Chandler Smith				2	23		64
29	Kyle Sieg			11		17		60
30	Owen Smith				18	22		48
31	David Gilliland			2				42
32	Stephen Nasse	6						38
33	Ryan Repko		9					35
34	Chuck Buchanan Jr.			10				34
35	Jason Kitzmiller			DNS		13		34
36	Tristan Van Wieringen **(R)**	11						33
37	Gus Dean					12		32
38	Gio Scelzi	13						31
39	Ed Pompa			13				31
40	Tim Richmond				13			31
41	Brian Finney	14						30
42	Holley Hollan	15						29
43	Tommy Vigh Jr.			15				29
44	Kris Wright					15		29
45	Gracie Trotter	16						28
46	Con Nicolopoulos					16		28
47	Joe Graf Jr.			17				27
48	Tanner Gray	18						26
49	Rick Clifton				19			25
50	Willie Mullins	20						24
51	Chuck Hiers	22						22
52	Wayne Peterson					26		18

== See also ==
- 2020 NASCAR Cup Series
- 2020 NASCAR Xfinity Series
- 2020 NASCAR Gander RV & Outdoors Truck Series
- 2020 ARCA Menards Series
- 2020 ARCA Menards Series West
- 2020 NASCAR Whelen Modified Tour
- 2020 NASCAR Pinty's FanCave Challenge
- 2020 NASCAR Whelen Euro Series
- 2020 CARS Tour
- 2020 eNASCAR iRacing Pro Invitational Series
- 2020 EuroNASCAR Esports Series
