= Tristan Van Wieringen =

American racing driver (born 1998)

- Born: February 19, 1998 (age 28); Amherstburg, Ontario, Canada

ARCA Menards Series East career
- 8 races run over 2 years
- Best finish: 15th (2018)
- First race: 2018 King Cadillac GMC Throwback 100 (Thompson)
- Last race: 2020 Skip's Western Outfitters 175 (New Smyrna)
Wins	Top tens	Poles
0	1	0
- Statistics up to date as of February 3, 2025.

Tristan Van Wieringen (born February 19, 1998) is a Canadian former professional stock car racing driver who has competed in the ARCA Menards Series East from 2018 to 2020. He is the younger brother of Dominique Van Wieringen, who also competed in ARCA, as well as the NASCAR Camping World Truck Series.

Hensley has also previously competed in the ASA CRA Super Series, the ASA Southern Super Series, the CARS Super Late Model Tour, the CRA JEGS All-Stars Tour, and the Midwest Modifieds Tour.

== Motorsports results ==
=== ARCA Menards Series East ===
(key) (Bold - Pole position awarded by qualifying time. Italics - Pole position earned by points standings or practice time. * – Most laps led.)

ARCA Menards Series East results
Year	Team	No.	Make	1	2	3	4	5	6	7	8	9	10	11	12	13	14	AMSEC	Pts	Ref
2018	Rette Jones Racing	30	Ford	NSM	BRI	LGY	SBO	SBO	MEM	NJM	THO; 11	NHA; 9	IOW; 14	GLN; 24	GTW; 17	NHA; 11	DOV; 13	15th	209	
2020	Rette Jones Racing	30	Toyota	NSM; 11	TOL	DOV	TOL	BRI	FIF									36th	33	

=== CARS Super Late Model Tour ===
(key)

CARS Super Late Model Tour results
Year	Team	No.	Make	1	2	3	4	5	6	7	8	9	10	CSLMTC	Pts	Ref
2016	Murray Van Wieringen	81	Ford	SNM	ROU	HCY	TCM	GRE	ROU	CON	MYB	HCY; 17	SNM	58th	16	
2018	N/A	81	Ford	MYB	NSH; 36	ROU	HCY	BRI	AND	HCY	ROU	SBO		N/A	0	
