= Derek Griffith =

American racing driver (born 1997)

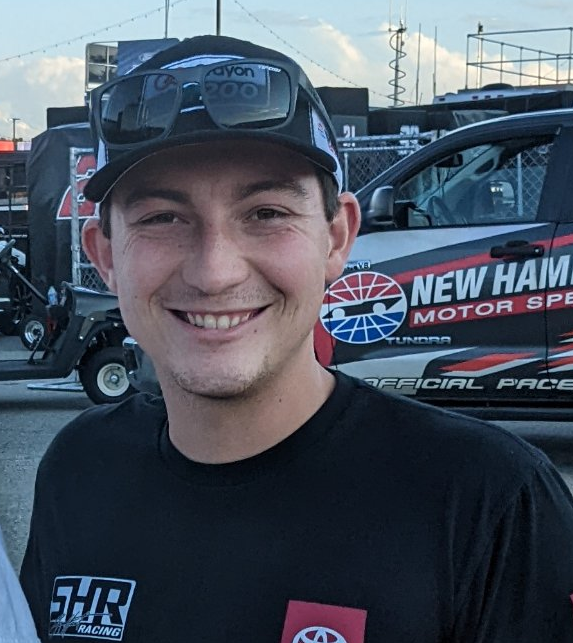
- Griffith at New Hampshire Motor Speedway in 2022
- Born: Derek P. Griffith; February 9, 1997 (age 29); Hudson, New Hampshire, U.S.

NASCAR O'Reilly Auto Parts Series career
- 6 races run over 1 year
- Best finish: 44th (2022)
- First race: 2022 ToyotaCare 250 (Richmond)
- Last race: 2022 Dead On Tools 250 (Martinsville)
Wins	Top tens	Poles
0	0	0

NASCAR FedEx Freight Truck Series career
- 1 race run over 1 year
- 2021 position: 79th
- Best finish: 79th (2021)
- First race: 2021 Toyota 200 (Gateway)
Wins	Top tens	Poles
0	0	0
- Statistics up to date as of July 16, 2022.

Derek P. Griffith (born February 9, 1997) is an American professional stock car racing driver. He last competed part-time in the NASCAR Xfinity Series, driving the No. 26 Toyota Supra for Sam Hunt Racing. Griffith has also competed in the ARCA Menards Series and super late model racing, winning the 2018 Pro All Stars Series national championship.

== Racing career ==
In his early years, Griffith raced at Hudson Speedway in New Hampshire, running four-cylinder cars. While in the kids' division at Hudson, Griffith was nicknamed "The Rock Star" for his long-haired appearance.

Griffith moved up from four-cylinders to super late models (SLMs) in 2012 and ran full-time in the Granite State Pro Stock Series in 2014. He won the 2015 GSPSS championship. In 2016, Griffith returned to the GSPSS, won the DAV Fall Classic at Seekonk Speedway and claimed his first career Pro All Stars Series (PASS) win. Griffith claimed two PASS North victories in 2017.

In 2018, Griffith won the PASS North Icebreaker at Thompson Speedway Motorsports Park, and claimed the PASS national championship. The majority of the title run was contested with a Lefthander chassis more than a decade old. He also started racing more outside of New Hampshire, venturing to South Carolina and Florida.

In 2019, Griffith held on to the PASS North points lead until the final race, when DJ Shaw overtook Griffith. He also acquired a new Fury Race Cars SLM chassis to race at the Snowball Derby, as Griffith's main chassis was not well suited for Florida rules variations. Griffith also took part in the Kulwicki Driver Development Program in 2019, and won Oktoberfest at Lee USA Speedway.

Griffith scored the cumulative title at the 2020 World Series of Asphalt. Chad Bryant Racing later signed Griffith to make his ARCA Menards Series East debut in the season-opening Skip's Western Outfitters 175. The drive came after Griffith meeting with CBR crew chief Paul Andrews through the Kulwicki Driver Development Program. He won the pole for the race. After finishing second in his debut race, Griffith and CBR secured enough funding to run a full East schedule in 2020. Due to the COVID-19 pandemic, CBR and Griffith discontinued their full-season East effort after one race and started running part-time in the national ARCA Menards Series. He continued racing super late models in 2020, winning Granite State Nationals at Claremont Motorsports Park in September. A weekend after that, Griffith won the Freedom 300 and associated $10,000 paycheck at Lee USA Speedway. He also continued to make appearances in the Granite State Pro Stock Series.

For 2021, Griffith remained in ARCA for another part-time schedule and moved from Chad Bryant Racing (which closed down and merged their ARCA operations into GMS Racing for 2021) to Venturini Motorsports. He drove their No. 55 Toyota in two races, which were the season-opener at Daytona as well as Kansas in May. Griffith would also drive for the team in ARCA's Daytona test session in January before the start of the season.

On July 1, 2021, Kyle Busch Motorsports announced that Griffith would make his NASCAR Camping World Truck Series debut at World Wide Technology Raceway driving the No. 51.

On September 21, 2025, Griffith took victory of the GSPSS Keen Parts 150 at Lee USA Speedway ahead of Corey Bubar and Joey Doiron. Griffith won his 8th career GSPSS series race. He plans to go onto the national level and participate in the Snowball Derby and World Series at New Smyrna Speedway.

== Personal life ==
Griffith attended Alvirne High School.

== Motorsports career results ==
=== Stock car career summary ===
Season	Series	Team	Races	Wins	Top 5	Top 10	Points	Position
2020	ARCA Menards Series East	Chad Bryant Racing	3	0	1	2	161	10th
2020	ARCA Menards Series	Chad Bryant Racing	8	0	2	7	293	13th
2021	CARS Super Late Model Tour	John Griffith	1	0	0	0	22	33rd
2021	ARCA Menards Series	Venturini Motorsports	2	0	1	1	54	66th
2021	NASCAR Camping World Truck Series	Kyle Busch Motorsports	1	0	0	0	11	79th
2022	NASCAR Xfinity Series	Sam Hunt Racing	6	0	0	0	92	44th
2023	ASA STARS National Tour	John Griffith	1	0	0	0	27	95th
2024	ASA STARS National Tour	John Griffith	1	0	0	0	24	95th
2025	ASA STARS National Tour	John Griffith	1	0	0	1	47	50th
2026	ASA STARS National Tour	John Griffith	0	0	0	0		

=== NASCAR ===
(key) (Bold – Pole position awarded by qualifying time. Italics – Pole position earned by points standings or practice time. * – Most laps led.)

==== Xfinity Series ====
NASCAR Xfinity Series results
Year	Team	No.	Make	1	2	3	4	5	6	7	8	9	10	11	12	13	14	15	16	17	18	19	20	21	22	23	24	25	26	27	28	29	30	31	32	33	NXSC	Pts	Ref
2022	Sam Hunt Racing	26	Toyota	DAY	CAL	LVS	PHO	ATL	COA	RCH; 26	MAR; 21	TAL	DOV	DAR	TEX	CLT	PIR	NSH	ROA	ATL	NHA; 18	POC	IND	MCH	GLN	DAY	DAR	KAN; 27	BRI	TEX	TAL; 23	CLT	LVS	HOM	MAR; 15	PHO	44th	92	

==== Camping World Truck Series ====
NASCAR Camping World Truck Series results
Year	Team	No.	Make	1	2	3	4	5	6	7	8	9	10	11	12	13	14	15	16	17	18	19	20	21	22	NCWTC	Pts	Ref
2021	Kyle Busch Motorsports	51	Toyota	DAY	DAY	LVS	ATL	BRI	RCH	KAN	DAR	COA	CLT	TEX	NSH	POC	KNX	GLN	GTW; 26	DAR	BRI	LVS	TAL	MAR	PHO	79th	11	

^{*} Season still in progress
^{1} Ineligible for series points

=== ARCA Menards Series ===
(key) (Bold – Pole position awarded by qualifying time. Italics – Pole position earned by points standings or practice time. * – Most laps led.)

ARCA Menards Series results
Year	Team	No.	Make	1	2	3	4	5	6	7	8	9	10	11	12	13	14	15	16	17	18	19	20	AMSC	Pts	Ref
2020	Chad Bryant Racing	22	Ford	DAY	PHO	TAL	POC; 8	IRP; 12	KEN; 7	IOW	KAN; 8	TOL; 7	TOL; 5	MCH	DAY	GTW	L44	TOL	BRI; 9	WIN	MEM	ISF	KAN; 3	13th	293	
2021	Venturini Motorsports	55	Toyota	DAY; 30	PHO	TAL																		66th	54	
2021	Venturini Motorsports	25	Toyota				KAN; 5	TOL	CLT	MOH	POC	ELK	BLN	IOW	WIN	GLN	MCH	ISF	MLW	DSF	BRI	SLM	KAN	66th	54	

==== ARCA Menards Series East ====
ARCA Menards Series East results
Year	Team	No.	Make	1	2	3	4	5	6	AMSEC	Pts	Ref
2020	Chad Bryant Racing	2	Ford	**NSM**; 2*	TOL	DOV	TOL			10th	161	
2020	Chad Bryant Racing	22	Ford					BRI; 9	FIF; 13	10th	161	

=== CARS Super Late Model Tour ===
(key)

CARS Super Late Model Tour results
Year	Team	No.	Make	1	2	3	4	5	6	7	8	CSLMTC	Pts	Ref
2021	John Griffith	12G	Chevy	HCY	GPS	NSH	JEN; 11	HCY	MMS	TCM	SBO	33rd	22	

=== ASA STARS National Tour ===
(key) (Bold – Pole position awarded by qualifying time. Italics – Pole position earned by points standings or practice time. * – Most laps led. ** – All laps led.)

ASA STARS National Tour results
Year	Team	No.	Make	1	2	3	4	5	6	7	8	9	10	11	12	ASNTC	Pts	Ref
2023	John Griffith	12	Toyota	FIF	MAD	NWS; 25	HCY	MLW	AND	WIR	TOL	WIN	NSV			95th	27	
2024	John Griffith	12	Toyota	NSM; 28	FIF	HCY	MAD	MLW	AND	OWO	TOL	WIN	NSV			95th	24	
2025	John Griffith	12G	Chevy	NSM; 8	FIF	DOM	HCY	NPS	MAD	SLG	AND	OWO	TOL	WIN	NSV	50th	47	
2026	John Griffith	12	Chevy	NSM; DNQ	FIF	HCY	SLG	MAD	NPS	OWO	TRI	WIN	NSV	NSM		-*	-*	
