= Universal Technical Institute =

American for-profit educational system

Universal Technical, Inc.
- Type: Private for-profit system of technical colleges
- Established: 1965; 61 years ago
- Location: Phoenix, Arizona, United States
- Website: uti.edu

Universal Technical Institute, Inc. (UTI) is a private for-profit system of technical colleges in the United States. It was established in 1965 by Robert Sweet.

== History ==
UTI was founded in 1965 by Robert Sweet to provide career-focused technical training for the transportation industry. The company expanded over the following decades with new programs and campuses, and in 1980 began offering continuing education and training for corporate clients.

In 1998, UTI acquired Clinton Harley Corporation and Clinton Education Group, Inc., which operated Motorcycle Mechanics Institute and Marine Mechanics Institute.

UTI has continued to grow through acquisitions. In 2021, UTI acquired MIAT College of Technology, a technical school offering programs in aviation, energy and manufacturing. The acquisition of Concorde Career Colleges followed in 2022.

== Academics ==
Each UTI campus is accredited by the Accrediting Commission of Career Schools and Colleges (ACCSC).

== Campus locations ==
UTI operates 18 trade school campuses across 11 states:

- Arizona: UTI-Avondale and UTI-Phoenix
- California: UTI-Long Beach, UTI-Rancho Cucamonga and UTI-Sacramento
- Florida: UTI-Miramar and UTI-Orlando
- Georgia: UTI-Atlanta
- Illinois: UTI-Lisle
- Michigan: UTI-Canton
- New Jersey: UTI-Bloomfield
- North Carolina: UTI-Mooresville
- Pennsylvania: UTI-Exton
- Texas: UTI-Austin, UTI-Dallas/Fort Worth, UTI-Houston and UTI-San Antonio
- Utah: UTI-Salt Lake City

One additional campus in Salt Lake City, Utah, is scheduled to open in 2027.

== Student services ==
Military and veteran support services include military-specific admissions reps, military-only campus orientations and lounge areas for veterans. Many UTI programs are also approved for GI Bill funding.

UTI participates in the Department of Defense SkillBridge program as well, offering eligible service members career training opportunities at Fort Bliss, Camp Pendleton, and Fort Bragg.
