= Visconti Motorsports =

American racing team

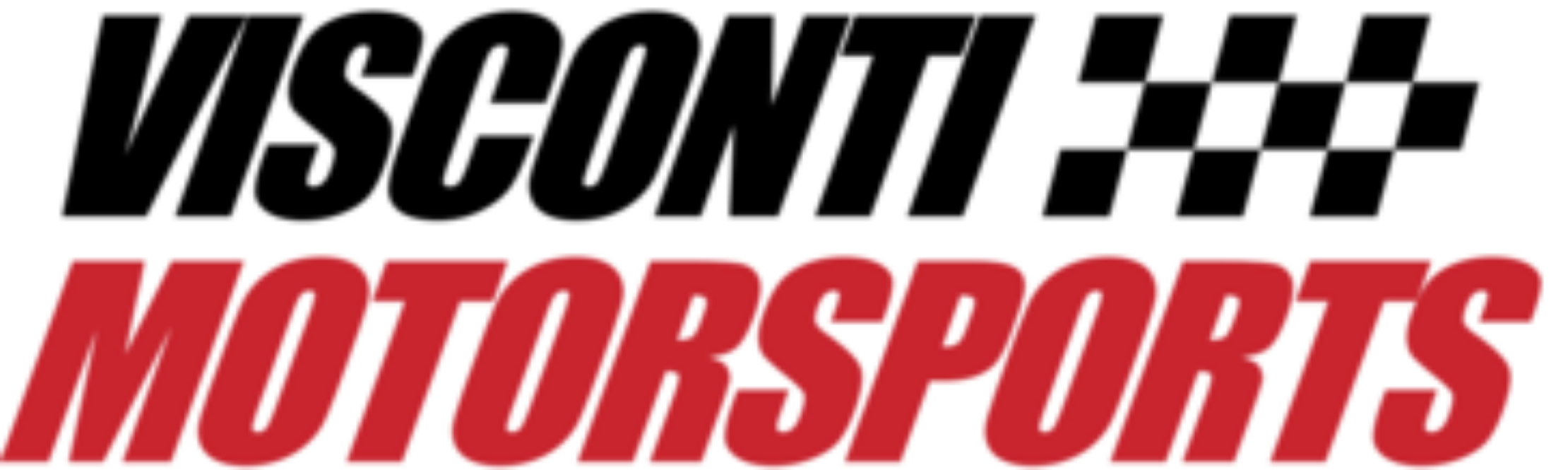
- Owner(s): John Visconti III; Marie Benevento-Visconti
- Base: Mooresville, North Carolina
- Series: ARCA Menards Series; ARCA Menards Series East
- Race drivers: ARCA Menards Series: ARCA Menards Series East: 74. Donald Theetge
- Manufacturer: Toyota
- Opened: 2015 Visconti Motorsports LLC

Career
- Debut: ARCA Menards Series East: 2018 New Smyrna 175 (New Smyrna); ARCA Menards Series: 2020 Menards.com 200 presented by XPxE (Toledo)
- Latest race: ARCA Menards Series: 2022 Reese's 200 (IRP); ARCA Menards Series East: 2022 Music City 200 (Nashville Fairgrounds)
- Races competed: Total: 50; NASCAR Truck Series: 13; ARCA Menards Series: 8 ARCA Menards Series East: 29
- Drivers' Championships: Total: 0 NASCAR Truck Series: 0 ARCA Menards Series: 0 ARCA Menards Series East: 0
- Race victories: Total: 1 NASCAR Truck Series: 0 ARCA Menards Series: 0 ARCA Menards Series East: 1
- Pole positions: Total: 1 NASCAR Truck Series: 0 ARCA Menards Series: 0 ARCA Menards Series East: 1

Visconti Motorsports is an American stock car racing team that competes in the ARCA Menards Series, fielding the No. 74 Toyota Camry for Donald Theetge in the ARCA Menards Series East. The team was founded in 2015 by John Visconti III and his wife, Marie Benevento-Visconti.

== NASCAR Whelen Modified Tour ==
The team made their NASCAR Whelen Modified Tour debut in 2017, fielding the 74 car part-time for C. J. Lehmann. Lehmann made four starts for the team that season, getting his best finish of 6th at Riverhead Raceway. They would end their season with a 7th-place finish at Charlotte Motor Speedway. After the end of the 2017 season, Visconti Motorsports didn't make another start in the Whelen Modified Tour.

== ARCA Menards Series East ==
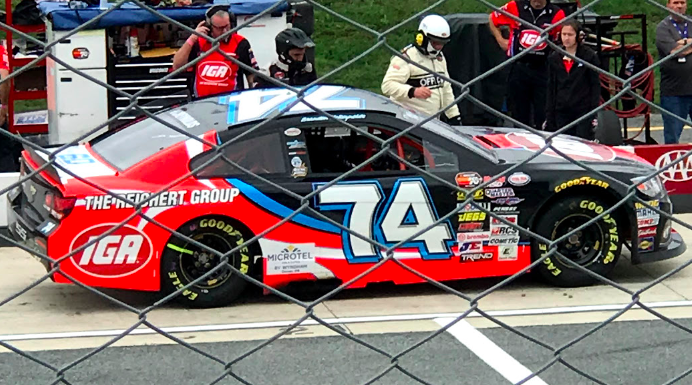
McReynolds in the No. 74 car at Dover International Speedway in 2018.

Visconti Motorsports would make their NASCAR K&N Pro Series East (now ARCA Menards Series East) debut in the 2018 season, fielding a part-time schedule for Brandon McReynolds. They would start out with a top ten at New Smyrna Speedway, followed by a top five at Bristol Motor Speedway. Austin Hill would drive the No. 74 car at Watkins Glen International, starting 13th and finishing 12th. McReynolds would get the team their first career East series win at New Hampshire Motor Speedway late in the season, after starting in third and leading the most laps. They would end their 2018 season with a 2nd-place finish at Dover International Speedway.

McReynolds returned to the team in 2019, driving only for a five race schedule. He started out the season with a 3rd-place finish at New Smyrna Speedway and Bristol Motor Speedway. Parker Retzlaff would make his East series debut for the team at Memphis International Raceway, starting 9th and finishing in 10th. He would make another start that season, finishing 5th at Gateway Motorsports Park. McReynolds was expected to drive the 74 at New Hampshire Motor Speedway, but due to a schedule conflict, Josh Berry would be the driver for the race instead. Berry would start 8th and finish 3rd. McReynolds did not return to the team in 2020 due to prior obligations with Noah Gragson and Jr. Motorsports.

Visconti Motorsports would sign late model driver Giovanni Bromante for a full-time schedule in 2020, competing for Rookie of the Year honors. However, Bromante would only end up running for two races, due to him stepping away from racing to work on his family's landscaping company. He would finish 5th at New Smyrna, and 11th at Toledo Speedway. Joe Graf Jr. would be driver of the 74 at Dover International Speedway, starting 14th and finishing 17th.

For 2021, Visconti Motorsports would sign Mason Diaz, for a full-time schedule in the East series. It would officially be Visconti Motorsports' first full-time season in the East series, after running part-time from 2018 to 2020. Diaz would start off the season with top fives in the first three races. He would end up 6th in the point standings after Bristol. The team scored the General Tire the fastest qualifier pole award at Southern National Speedway and led 162 of 200 laps during the race.

On January 21, 2022, it was announced that Donald Theetge would drive for two races in the 2022 ARCA Menards Series East.

== NASCAR K&N Pro Series West ==
Visconti Motorsports made their NASCAR K&N Pro Series West debut in 2019, fielding in the paired event with the East series, with Parker Retzlaff as the driver. Retzlaff would finish in 5th.

== ARCA Menards Series ==
The team made their ARCA Menards Series debut in 2020, only for a three race schedule. Giovanni Bromante would drive the 74 car at Toledo Speedway, starting 10th and finishing 15th. Austin Green would take over the car at the second Toledo Speedway race, finishing in a respectable 7th. Ayrton Ori would drive the car at the Daytona International Speedway Road Course, starting and finishing in 17th after running as high as 4th, an unscheduled pitstop for a flat tire with 3 laps to go hurt their chances at a top 5 finish.

For the 2021 season, the team would primarily field the car for Mason Diaz, in the paired event races with the East series. Chris Werth, an anesthesiologist for a local hospital, would make his ARCA Menards Series debut at Watkins Glen International, starting and finishing in 20th.

Visconti's number 74 continued to be used in ARCA in 2022 using a car and equipment that Visconti sold to former Truck Series team owner Steve Chick Jr. who continued to field the team in the race at IRP. Team Chick kept Visconti's number 74, as it was a number Chick's Truck Series team had in 2004.
