= Race to Stop Suicide 200 =

ARCA Menards Series East race

ARCA Menards Series East
- Venue: New Smyrna Speedway
- Location: New Smyrna Beach, Florida
- First race: 2014
- Last race: 2022
- Distance: 96 miles (154 km)
- Laps: 200
- Previous names: New Smyrna 150 presented by JEGS (2014); The Hart to Heart Breast Cancer Foundation 150 (2015); Jet Tools 150 (2016–2018); New Smyrna 175 (2019); Skip's Western Outfitters 175 (2020); Jeep Beach 175 (2021)

Circuit information
- Surface: Asphalt
- Length: 0.48 mi (0.77 km)
- Turns: 4

The Race to Stop Suicide 200 presented by Place of Hope was an ARCA Menards Series East stock car race held annually at New Smyrna Speedway in New Smyrna Beach, Florida from 2014 to 2022. The race was always the season opener and took place in February on the same week or the weekend before the Daytona 500 at the nearby Daytona International Speedway.

== History ==
The race was established in 2014 and held on the same weekend as the track's World Series of Asphalt race.

The race was originally 150 laps and 72 miles long (from 2014 to 2017), then 175 laps and 84 miles long (from 2018 to 2021), and finally 200 laps and 96 miles long in the final edition.

== Winners ==
Year	Date	No.	Driver	Team	Manufacturer	Race Distance		Race Time	Average speed (mph)
Year	Date	No.	Driver	Team	Manufacturer	Laps	Miles	Race Time	Average speed (mph)
2014	February 16	6	Daniel Suárez	Rev Racing	Toyota	150	72 (115.873)	1:05:52	93.522
2015	February 15	22	Austin Hill	Austin Hill Racing	Ford	151*	73 (117.482)	1:06:10	65.725
2016	February 14	16	Todd Gilliland	Bill McAnally Racing	Toyota (2)	150	72 (115.873)	1:03:22	68.175
2017	February 19	04	Ronnie Bassett Jr.	Bassett Racing	Chevrolet	150	72 (115.873)	1:09:11	62.443
2018	February 11	54	Todd Gilliland	DGR-Crosley	Toyota (3)	175	84 (135.184)	1:18:41	64.054
2019	February 11	16	Derek Kraus	Bill McAnally Racing (2)	Toyota (4)	175	84 (135.184)	1:13.59	68.123
2020	February 10	21	Sam Mayer	GMS Racing	Chevrolet (2)	175	84 (135.184)	1:15.56	66.374
2021	February 8	30	Max Gutiérrez	Rette Jones Racing	Ford (2)	187*	89.76 (144.454)	1:23:53	64.203
2022	February 15	18	Sammy Smith	Kyle Busch Motorsports	Toyota	200	96 (154)	1:59:19	48.275

2015: Race extended due to a green-white-checker finish.
2021: Race extended due to multiple green-white-checker finish attempts.

Previous race: Bush's Beans 200 (the previous season)	ARCA Menards Series East; Race to Stop Suicide 200	Next race: Pensacola 200
