= Corey Heim =

American racing driver (born 2002)

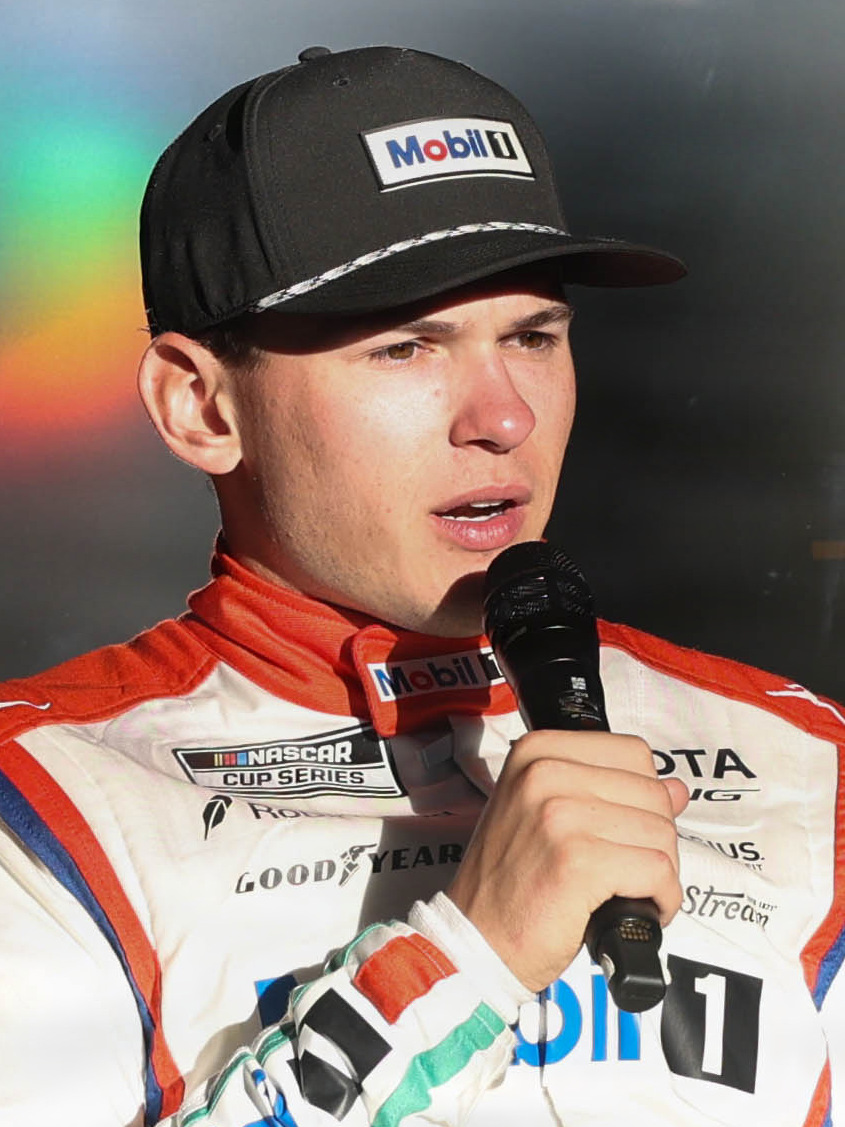
- Heim at Naval Base Coronado in 2026
- Born: Corey David Heim; July 5, 2002 (age 24); Marietta, Georgia, U.S.
- Achievements: 2025 NASCAR Craftsman Truck Series Champion; 2023, 2025 NASCAR Craftsman Truck Series Regular Season Champion; 2017 Thursday Thunder Legends Pro Division Champion; 2026 Brickyard 400 Winner; 2026 Anduril 250 Winner; 2020 SpeedFest 200 Winner; 2022 Thunder Road 200 Winner; Records; Cup Series; Quickest to reach 2 NASCAR Cup Series wins in the modern era (1972–present, 15 starts in 2026); Truck Series; Youngest to Reach 10 Career Wins in history (22 Years, 7 Days); Winningest Driver in a single-season (12 in 2025); Most top-fives in a row in a single season (9 in 2025); Most laps led in a single-season (1,627 in 2025); First driver in the top-3 NASCAR national series to lead a lap in every race in a single season (2025); Most NASCAR stage-wins in a single-season (23 in 2025); Most consecutive races with a lap led (31 races)
- Awards: 2022 NASCAR Camping World Truck Series Rookie of the Year; 2020 CARS Late Model Stock Car Tour Rookie of the Year; 2018 CARS Super Late Model Tour Rookie of the Year; 2018 Southern Super Series Rookie of the Year

NASCAR Cup Series career
- 20 races run over 3 years
- Car no., team: No. 67 (23XI Racing)
- 2026 position: 42nd
- Best finish: 42nd (2026)
- First race: 2024 Würth 400 (Dover)
- Last race: 2026 Season Finale 400 (Homestead)
- First win: 2026 Anduril 250 (Coronado)
- Last win: 2026 Brickyard 400 (Indianapolis)
Wins	Top tens	Poles
2	5	0

NASCAR O'Reilly Auto Parts Series career
- 20 races run over 3 years
- 2025 position: 87th
- Best finish: 82nd (2024)
- First race: 2023 A-GAME 200 (Dover)
- Last race: 2025 SciAps 300 (Bristol)
Wins	Top tens	Poles
0	6	0

NASCAR FedEx Freight Truck Series career
- 98 races run over 6 years
- 2026 position: 17th
- Best finish: 1st (2025)
- First race: 2021 LiftKits4Less.com 200 (Darlington)
- Last race: 2026 Craftsman 200 (Homestead)
- First win: 2022 Fr8 208 (Atlanta)
- Last win: 2026 DQS Solutions & Staffing 250 (Michigan)
Wins	Top tens	Poles
26	76	14

ARCA Menards Series career
- 44 races run over 5 years
- Best finish: 2nd (2021)
- First race: 2019 ARCA Pensacola 200 (Pensacola)
- Last race: 2025 Henry Ford Health 200 (Michigan)
- First win: 2020 Speediatrics 150 (Kansas)
- Last win: 2022 Kansas Lottery 150 (Kansas)
Wins	Top tens	Poles
9	42	7

ARCA Menards Series East career
- 6 races run over 2 years
- Best finish: 9th (2020)
- First race: 2020 Skip's Western Outfitters 175 (New Smyrna)
- Last race: 2021 Bush's Beans 200 (Bristol)
Wins	Top tens	Poles
0	6	0

ARCA Menards Series West career
- 3 races run over 3 years
- Best finish: 24th (2020)
- First race: 2019 Arizona Lottery 100 (Phoenix)
- Last race: 2021 General Tire 150 (Phoenix)
Wins	Top tens	Poles
0	2	0
- Statistics up to date as of November 8, 2026.

Corey David Heim (born July 5, 2002) is an American professional stock car racing driver. He competes full-time in the NASCAR Cup Series, driving the No. 67 Toyota Camry XSE for 23XI Racing.

Heim started driving in NASCAR with Kyle Busch Motorsports in the NASCAR Truck Series. He is the 2025 NASCAR Craftsman Truck Series champion, alongside winning the 2023 and 2025 Truck Series regular season championship. Heim progressed to the NASCAR Cup Series beginning with a part-time schedules with Toyota Racing Development teams Legacy Motor Club and 23XI Racing. Before transitioning to full-time competition in 2027, he earned his first two career Cup Series victories in 2026 by winning the inaugural Anduril 250 and the crown-jewel Brickyard 400.

== Early life and family background ==
Heim was born on July 5, 2002 in Marietta, Georgia. He is the son of Lisa and Ray Heim. Ray Heim was a former late model racer and the Chief Technology Officer at Pen-Tech Associates, Inc in Kennesaw, Georgia. Heim graduated from Kennesaw Mountain High School.

== Racing career ==
=== Early career ===
Heim raced in Legends cars, winning the 2016 Young Lions division and the 2017 Thursday Thunder Pro division championship at Atlanta Motor Speedway. He later transitioned to running super late models, driving in events sanctioned by the CARS Tour, Southern Super Series, Pro All-Stars Series (PASS), and NASCAR Whelen All-American Series. Late in 2018, Heim crossed the finish line first in the ValleyStar Credit Union 300, but lost the race on a rules procedure. A short time later, he won his first super late model race, at South Boston Speedway. Even after moving up to national touring series, Heim still raced at large late model events like Short Track Nationals, and almost scored a PASS win at Richmond Raceway in March 2018 before being disqualified because of engine spacers. On January 12, 2020, Heim announced a full-season CARS Late Model Stock Tour schedule with Lee Pulliam Performance. On January 25, Heim won the SpeedFest 200 late model race in Georgia.

=== ARCA ===
==== 2019 ====
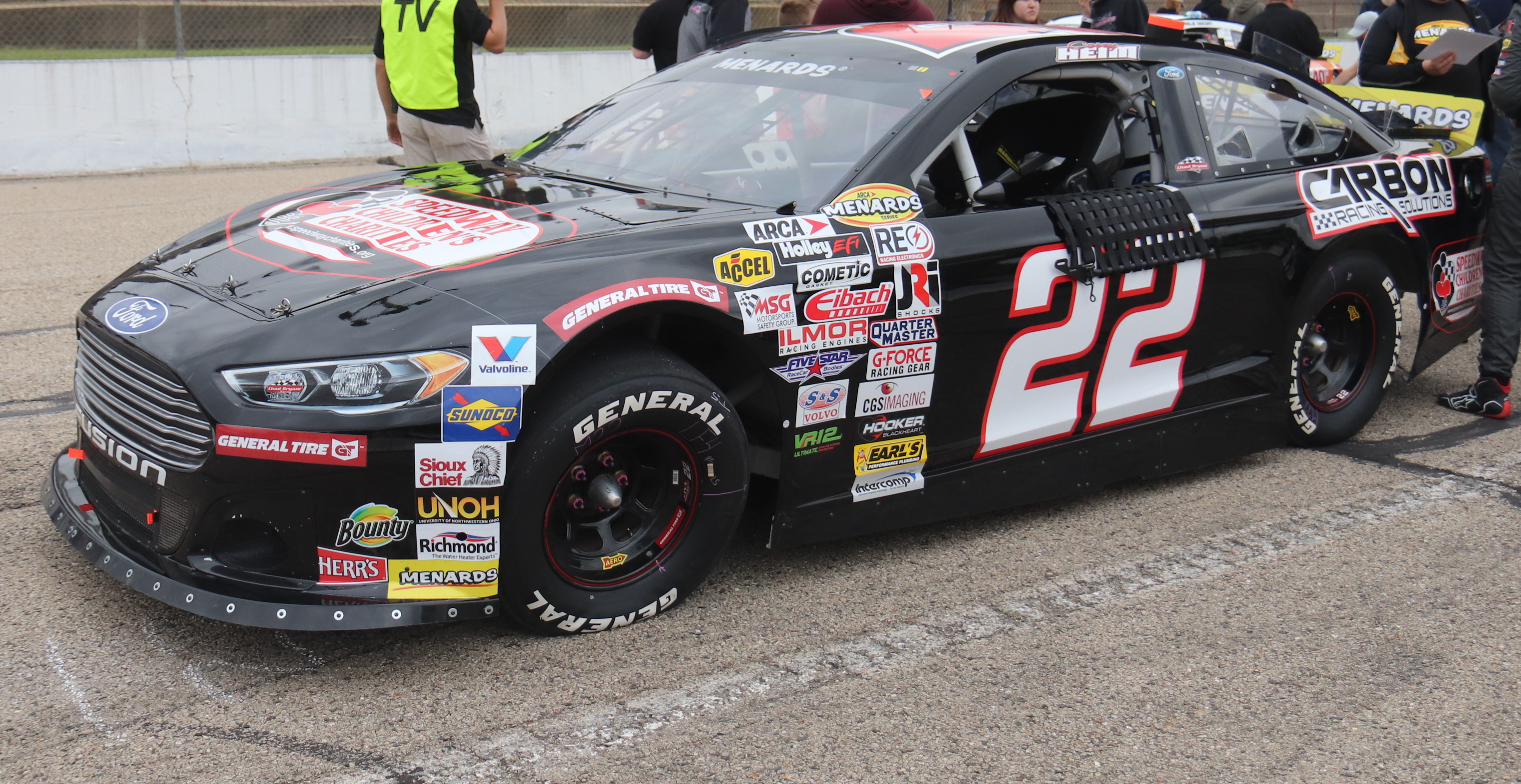
Heim in 2019 before the race at Madison.

Heim began racing in the ARCA Menards Series in 2019. He joined Chad Bryant Racing to run thirteen of twenty ARCA Menards Series events in the team's No. 22 car. He scored a top-five finish in his series debut, which came at Five Flags Speedway in March. Despite not running the full season, Heim ended up finishing tenth in the standings. Although he went winless, Heim never failed to finish any of his races, and scored a top-ten in all of them except for Nashville, where he finished eleventh.

==== 2020 ====
On January 16, it was announced that Heim would join Venturini Motorsports for seven total races: three in the ARCA Menards Series East, and two apiece in the ARCA Menards Series and the ARCA Menards Series West. On July 24, Heim placed fourth at Kansas Speedway in ARCA Menards Series competition after a flat tire dropped him from second on the final lap. In his return to Kansas in October, Heim led the most laps and won the race.

==== 2021 ====
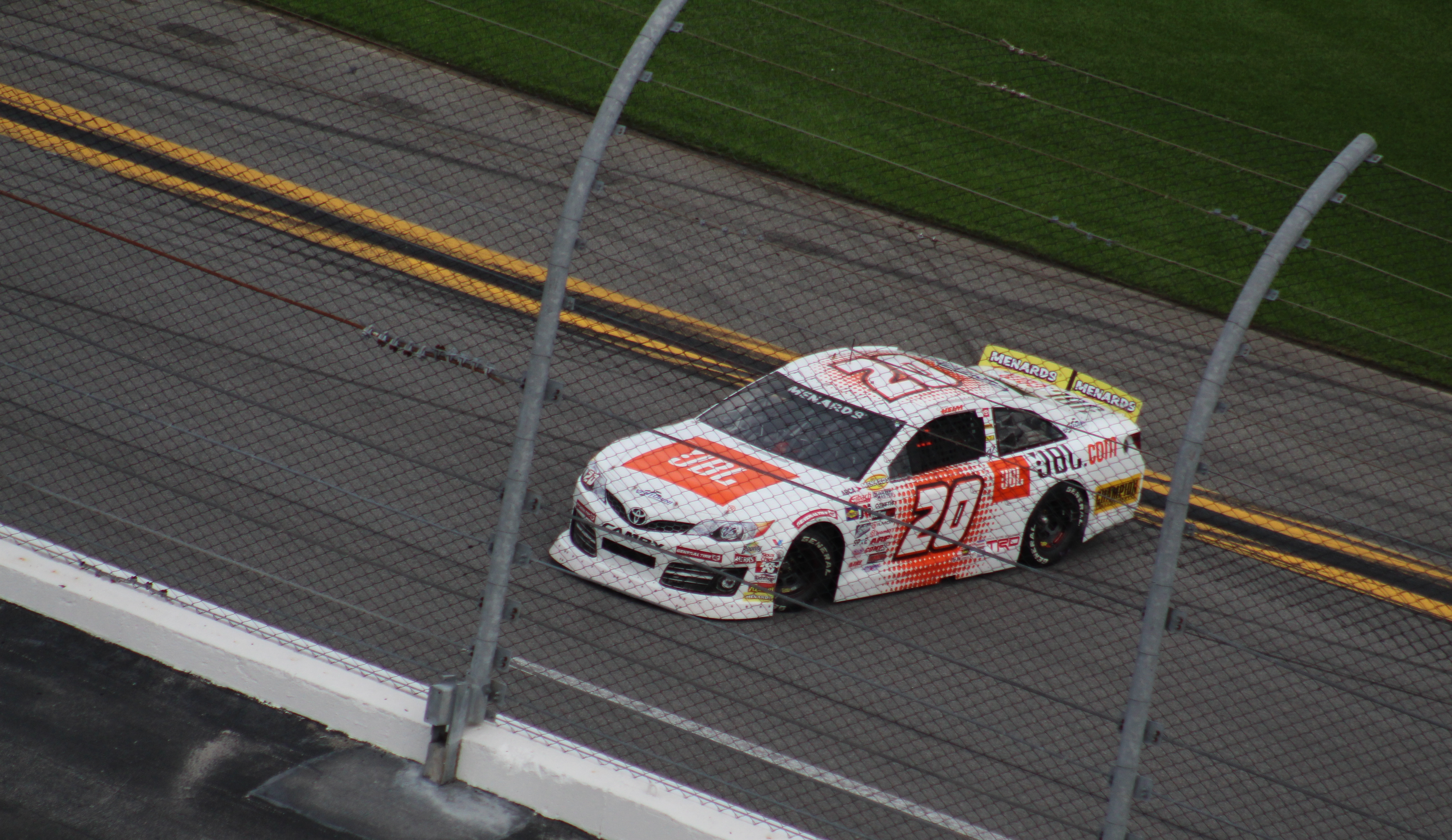
Heim doing burnouts after winning the ARCA race at Daytona in 2021

In 2021, Heim was promoted to a full-time deal with Venturini, driving the No. 20 in the main ARCA Menards Series, replacing Chandler Smith and Ryan Repko. Smith moved up to the Truck Series full-time in 2021 with Kyle Busch Motorsports. Heim's crew chief that year would be Shannon Rursch, who moved over from Venturini's No. 15 car of Drew Dollar. Heim would start the season with a win in the season-opener at Daytona. Throughout the season, he scored wins at Talladega, Pocono, Elko, Watkins Glen, and Illinois. He was known for having a season-long rivalry with Ty Gibbs, who ended up as the 2021 champion, with Heim finishing second by 37 points.

==== 2022 ====
Heim continued to run for Venturini in 2022, running a seven-race slate. He scored wins at Daytona and Kansas during the season.

==== 2025 ====
After a three-year hiatus, Heim returned to ARCA competition in 2025, driving for Venturini in their No. 25 car at Michigan, subbing for the original driver, Jake Finch, who suffered from an illness prior to the race. Heim ended up finishing second in the race.

=== Craftsman Truck Series ===
2021

On April 19, 2021, Kyle Busch revealed in an interview that Heim would make his Truck Series debut in the No. 51 for his Kyle Busch Motorsports team at Darlington. Heim made his NCWTS debut at Darlington Raceway on May 7 in the Kyle Busch Motorsports number 51 truck. He would finish 23rd after being wrecked from behind on a late race restart.

2022

Heim rejoined KBM for a 15-race Truck schedule in 2022. On March 19, 2022, Heim won his first NCWTS race at his home track of Atlanta with a last lap pass of his teammate Chandler Smith. He won his second race at Gateway, but because he did not run a full-time schedule, he was ineligible for the playoffs. Despite missing seven races, Heim finished the season fourteenth in points and won the 2022 Camping World Truck Series Rookie of the Year honors.

2023

On October 27, 2022, David Gilliland Racing announced that they will be moving to Toyota Racing Development in 2023, and renaming to Tricon Garage. That same day, Heim was announced as one of the full-time drivers for the team. Heim scored his first win of the season at Martinsville. He was forced to miss Gateway due to an illness; Jesse Love substituted for him and finished ninth in the race. Despite missing one race, Heim maintained the points lead and scored his second win at Mid-Ohio. At the conclusion of the Richmond race, Heim claimed the regular season championship. During the playoffs, Heim won at Bristol. Heim finished third at Homestead to make the Championship 4. He finished eighteenth at Phoenix after being spun out by Carson Hocevar and third in the final points standings. However, on November 8, 2023, Heim was penalized 25 driver points and fined US$12,500 by NASCAR for intentionally wrecking Hocevar with three laps to go; the loss of driver points resulted in Heim dropping to fourth in the points standings.

2024

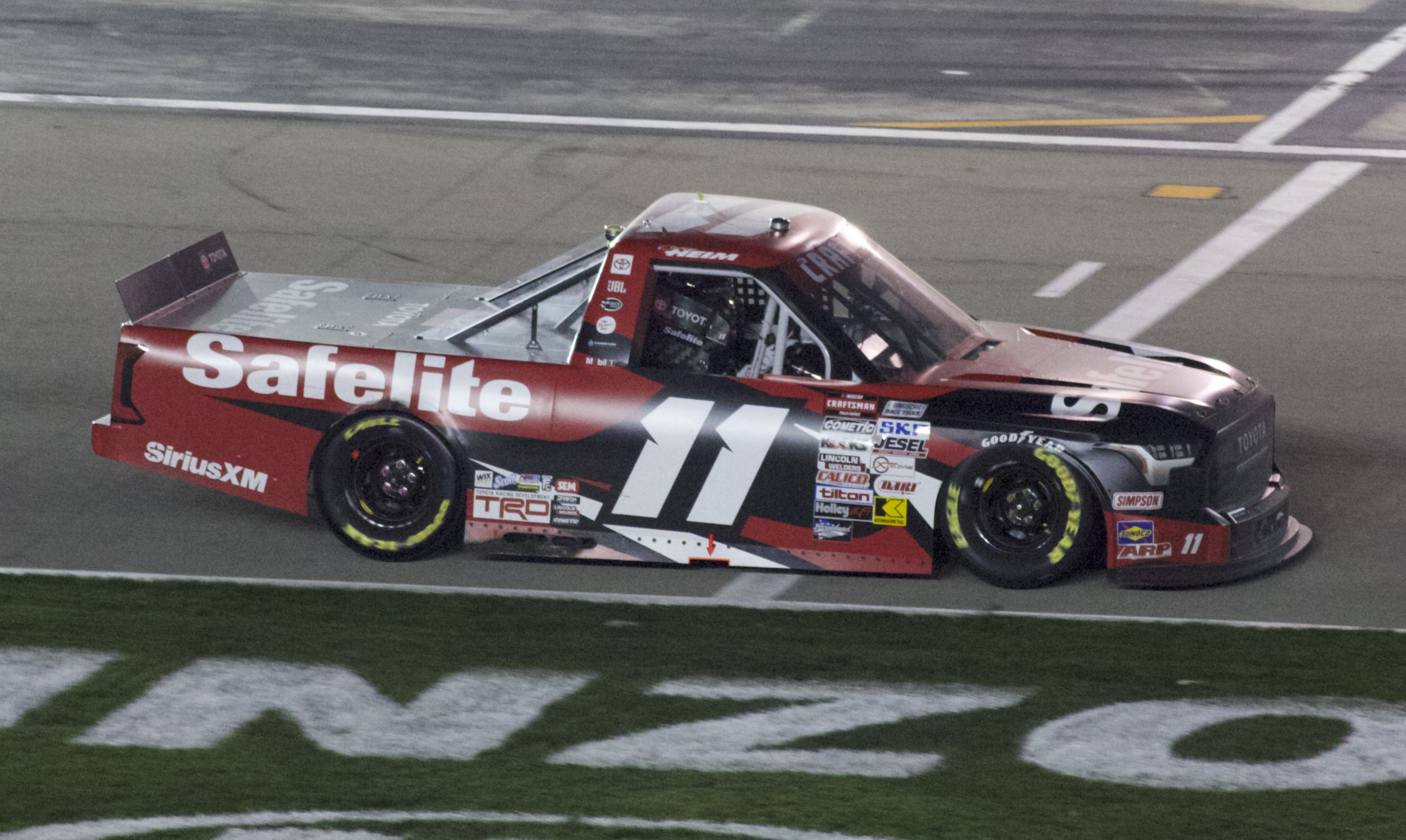
Heim's No. 11 truck at Las Vegas Motor Speedway in 2024

Heim started the 2024 season with a second-place finish at Daytona. Throughout the regular season, he scored wins at COTA, Kansas, North Wilkesboro, Gateway, and Pocono. During the playoffs, Heim won at Kansas. He finished second in the final points standings.

2025

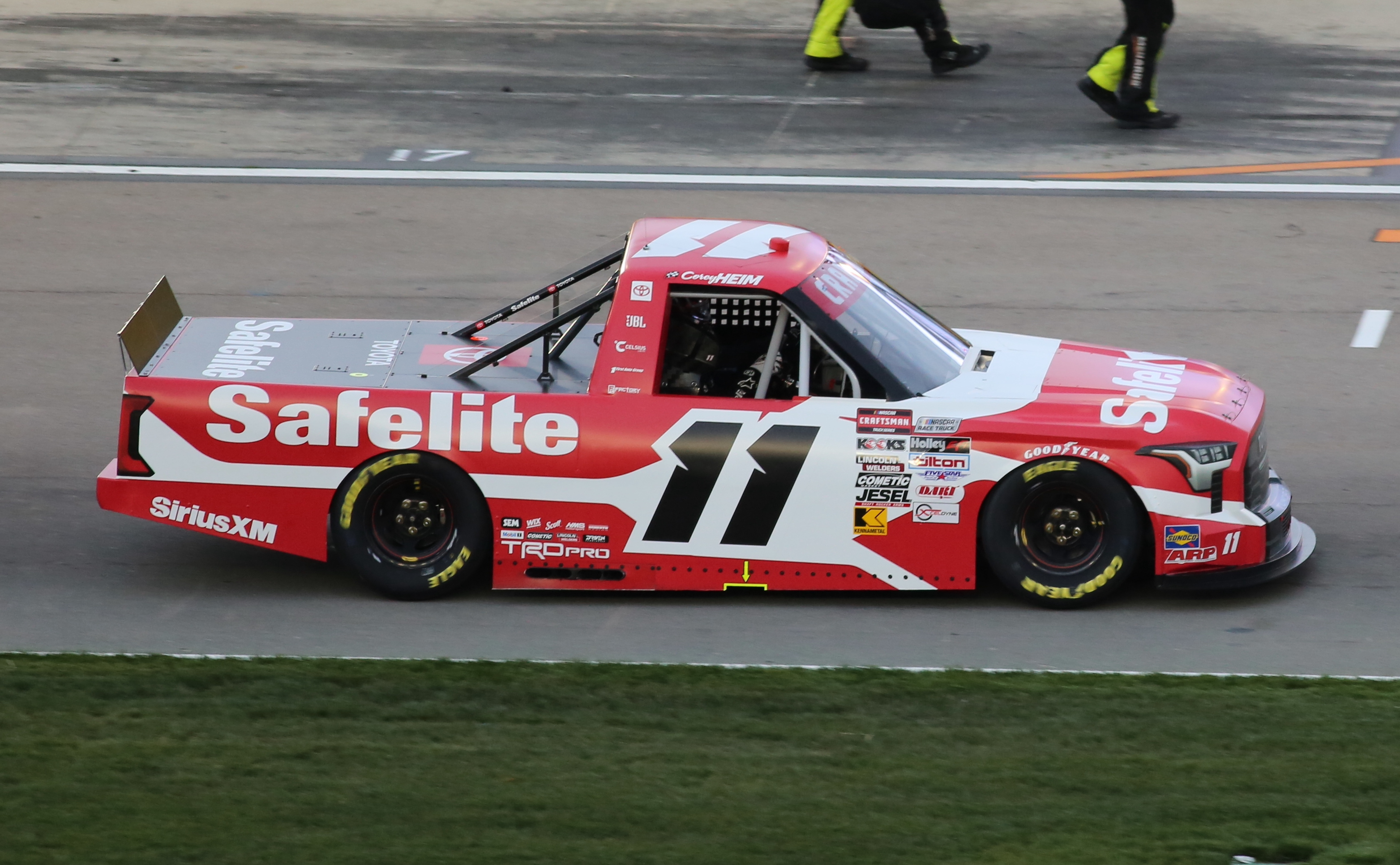
Heim's No. 11 truck at Las Vegas Motor Speedway in 2025

Heim started the 2025 season with another second-place finish at Daytona; however, the initial race winner, Parker Kligerman, failed post-race inspection after it was found that his truck was too low. Kligerman was disqualified, and Heim would be awarded the win. In the regular-season, he also scored wins at Las Vegas, Texas, Charlotte, Lime Rock, Watkins Glen, and Richmond. During the playoffs, he won at Darlington, New Hampshire, and the Charlotte Roval; the latter earning him a record ten wins in a season, beating Greg Biffle's previous record of nine wins in 1999. He scored his eleventh win of the season at Martinsville to make the Championship 4. Heim concluded the season with a win at Phoenix to claim the Truck Series championship.

2026

Heim returned to Tricon on a multi-race deal in the Nos. 1 and 5 trucks. During that time, he won at Darlington in the No. 5 and at Rockingham and Michigan in the No. 1. At Rockingham, after points leader Chandler Smith was disqualified following post-race inspection, Heim achieved a rare feat in NASCAR by tying the points lead with Kaden Honeycutt despite being part-time and missing two races.

=== Xfinity Series ===
2023

On April 29, 2023, Heim made his Xfinity Series debut at Dover, driving the Sam Hunt Racing No. 24 Toyota to a 35th-place DNF after experiencing engine failure. Two weeks later, he finished tenth at Darlington. He ran two more races that season, finishing 37th at Pocono and fifteenth at Darlington in September.

2024

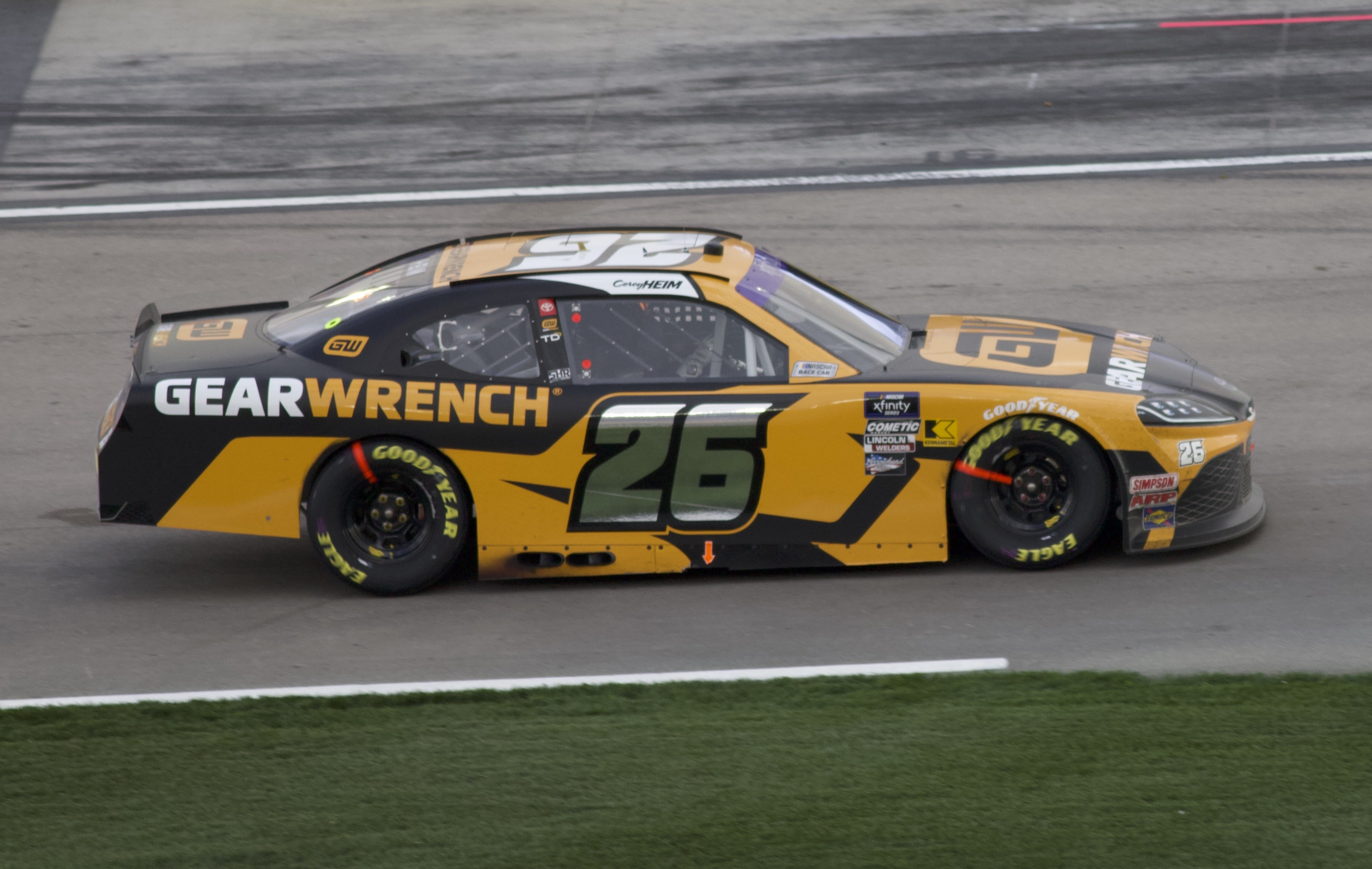
Heim's No. 26 car at Las Vegas Motor Speedway in 2024

On January 10, 2024, it was announced that Heim will return to Sam Hunt Racing in 2024, running another part-time schedule in the No. 26 car. He ran a 13-race slate, with three top-fives and four top-tens.

2025

On February 23, 2025, it was announced that Heim would return to Sam Hunt Racing, competing part-time for a third season for the team. He ran three races with a best finish of eighth in the Bristol spring race.

=== Cup Series ===
2024

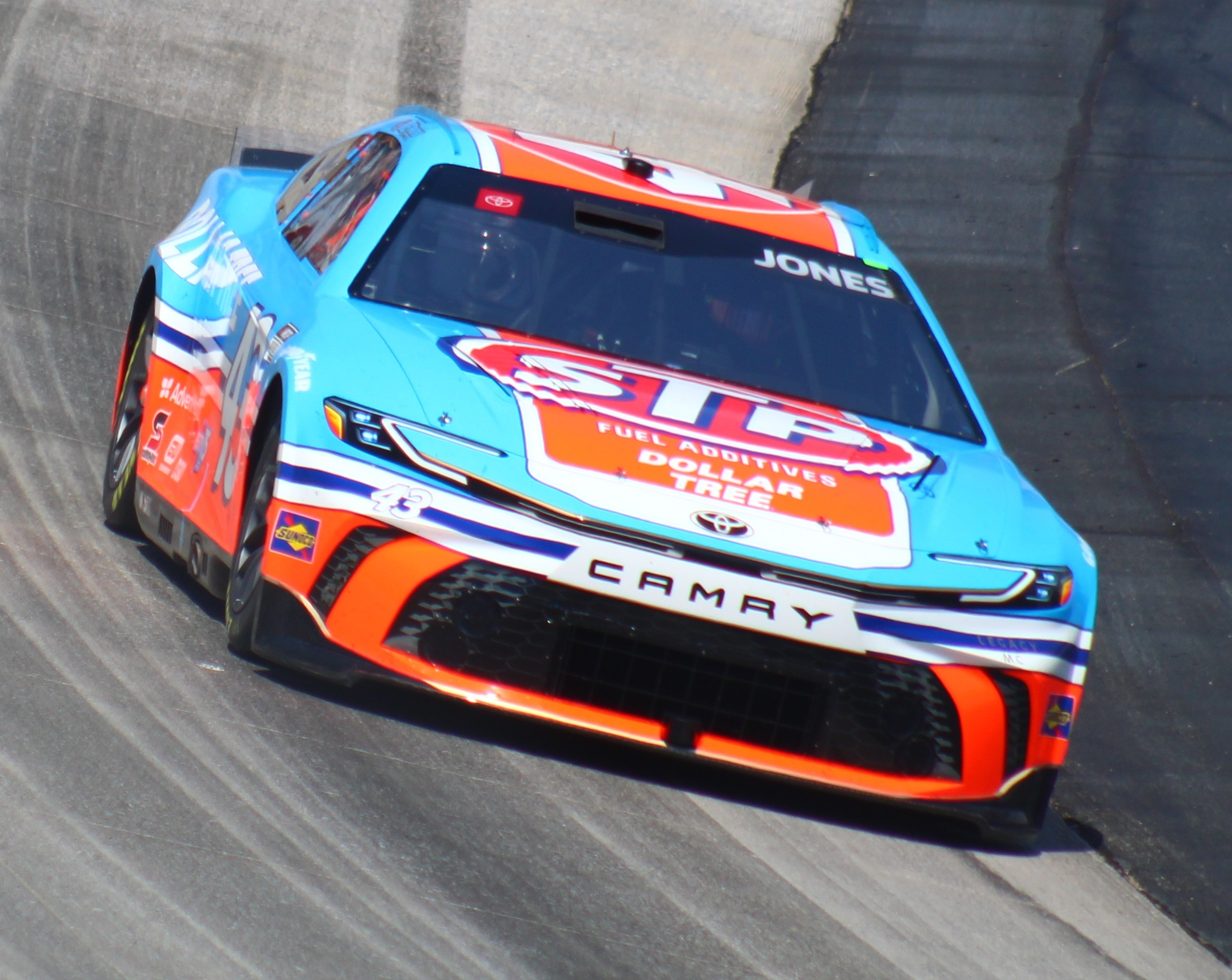
Heim filling in for Jones in the No. 43 at Dover

On January 25, 2024, it was announced that Heim would join Legacy Motor Club and 23XI Racing as their reserve driver throughout the Cup Series in 2024. In addition, he would also serve as Legacy's simulator driver. Heim would make his Cup Series debut at Dover as a result of an injury suffered by Erik Jones the previous weekend at Talladega. Heim would finish in 25th, three laps down. Heim would also race in the No. 43 at Kansas, finishing 22nd and on the lead lap, despite Jones being cleared to race.

2025

On February 23, 2025, it was announced that Heim had signed a multi-year deal with 23XI Racing to be the team's development driver, which included driving a partial schedule in the No. 67 Toyota. In his first start at Kansas Speedway, he finished in 13th after starting in 28th place. He then finished 37th in his next start at Nashville Superspeedway due to a crash. At the Chicago Street Course, Heim failed to qualify after being bumped by Katherine Legge. He then made another start at Richmond Raceway, where he finished in 29th place. In his final Cup start of the year at Bristol Motor Speedway, Heim earned his first career top-ten after finishing in sixth despite starting in 38th place.

2026

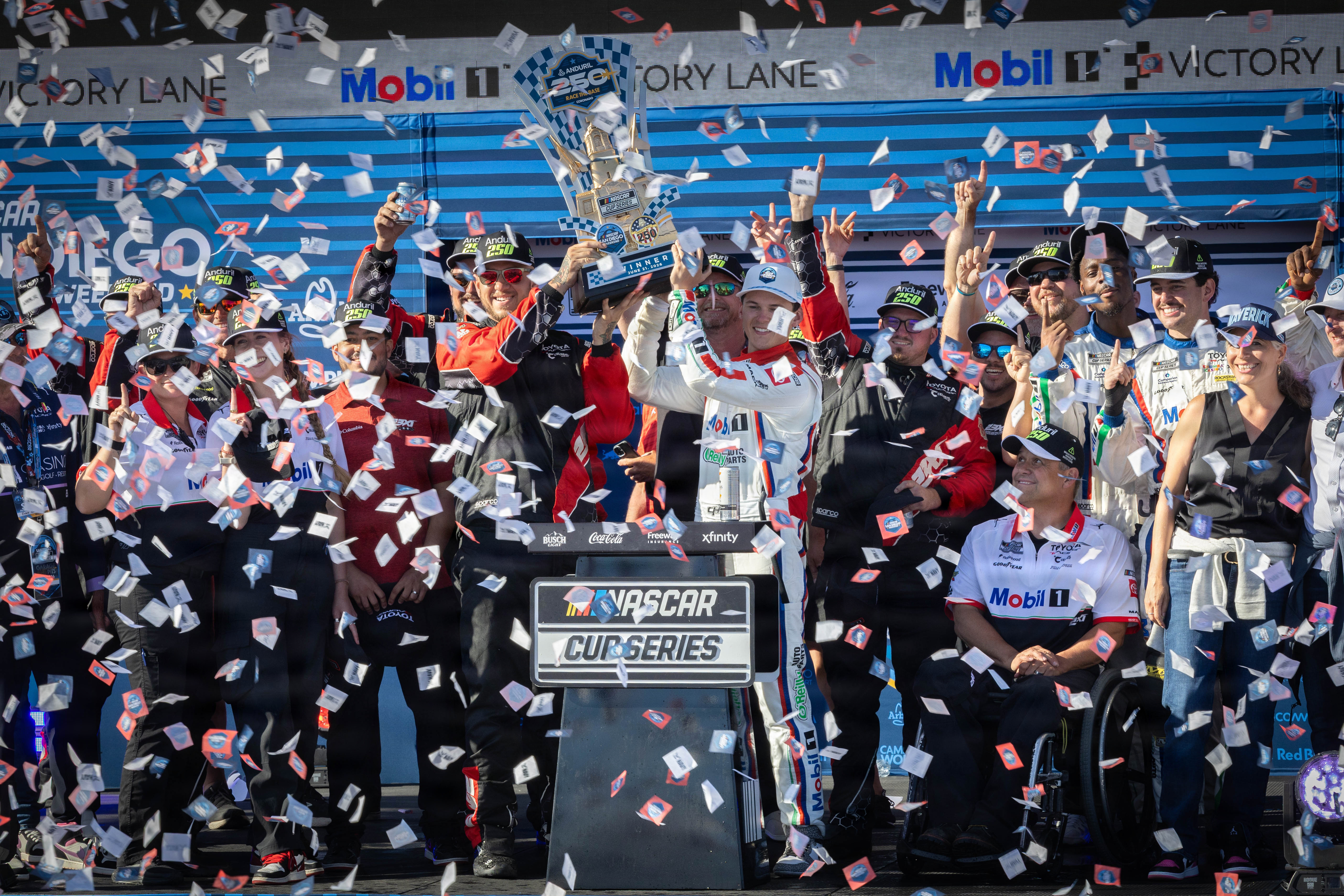
Heim celebrating after winning the 2026 Anduril 250

On January 27, 2026, it was announced that Heim will once again run a partial schedule in the No. 67, including an attempt to make the Daytona 500. Heim would end up leading 69 laps at Texas before a late spin in the race resulted in him finishing 31st. At Coronado, he pulled off the upset and held off teammate Tyler Reddick to win the inaugural running of the event. He later won the Brickyard 400 at Indianapolis, where he became the first driver to win their first two races in fifteen starts since A. J. Foyt in 1965.

2027

On May 30, 2026, it was announced that Heim would compete full-time in the No. 35 for 23XI Racing, replacing Riley Herbst. It would later be revealed that the No. 35 will be renumbered to the No. 67.

=== Driving style ===
Heim is recognized for a smooth, technical driving style paired with late-race aggression. He is known for having strong restarts as well as his adaptability across ovals and road courses.

==== Controversy ====
On September 26, 2026, following the conclusion of the ValleyStar Credit Union 300 at Martinsville Speedway, Heim was jumped by various members of Chad Bryant Racing and Chad Bryant himself. Heim had previously competed for Bryant in ARCA competition in 2019. The incident occurred after Heim moved Lapcevich for second place on the final lap, utilizing the "bump and run". After the checkered flag, Lapcevich would door Heim in turn 1 causing Heim to clip the curb and run back up into Lapcevich's car, climbing over top of his left front fender and destroying both racecars. At least four crew members cornered him at Martinsville's hot dog stand, throwing over a dozen shots at Heim, with only one actually landing. Days later, Bryant and CBR crew member Steven Civitarese were given an indefinite suspension by NASCAR, as well as being barred from participating in the 2027 edition of the race.

== Personal life ==
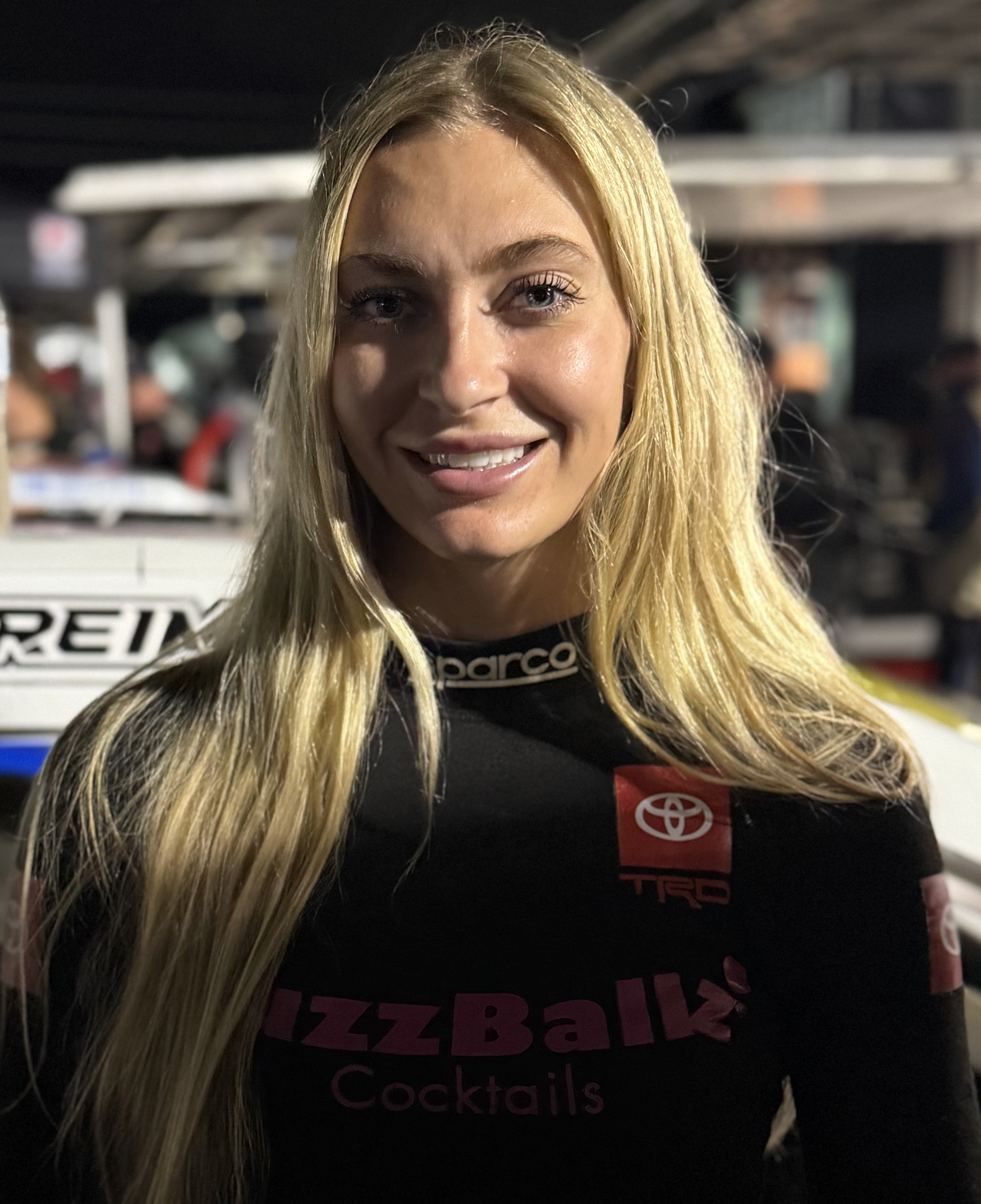
Taylor Reimer in 2025.

Heim has been in a relationship with fellow ARCA Menards Series driver Taylor Reimer since 2024.

== Motorsports career results ==
=== Stock car career summary ===
Season	Series	Team	Races	Wins	Top 5	Top 10	Points	Position
2018	CARS Super Late Model Tour	Ray Heim	9	1	3	6	224	**2nd**
2019	CARS Super Late Model Tour	Ray Heim	5	0	3	5	137	8th
2019	CARS Late Model Stock Tour	Lee Pulliam Performance	3	0	1	1	62	26th
2019	ARCA Menards Series	Chad Bryant Racing	13	0	8	12	2615	10th
2019	NASCAR K&N Pro Series West	Chad Bryant Racing	1	0	0	0	19	65th
2020	CARS Super Late Model Tour	Ray Heim	3	0	0	1	57	13th
2020	CARS Late Model Stock Tour	Lee Pulliam Performance	10	1	5	8	275	**3rd**
2020	ARCA Menards Series	Fast Track Racing	1	1	1	1	123	28th
2020	ARCA Menards Series	Venturini Motorsports	2	0	1	2	123	28th
2020	ARCA Menards Series East	Venturini Motorsports	3	0	1	3	167	9th
2020	ARCA Menards Series West	Venturini Motorsports	1	0	0	1	86	23rd
2021	CARS Super Late Model Tour	Ray Heim	1	0	1	1	32	20th
2021	ARCA Menards Series	Venturini Motorsports	20	6	16	20	963	**2nd**
2021	ARCA Menards Series East	Venturini Motorsports	3	0	2	3	167	12th
2021	ARCA Menards Series West	Venturini Motorsports	1	0	1	1	43	36th
2021	NASCAR Camping World Truck Series	Kyle Busch Motorsports	3	0	0	0	71	42nd
2022	CARS Late Model Stock Car Tour	Lee Pulliam Performance	3	0	2	2	63	32nd
2022	ARCA Menards Series	Venturini Motorsports	7	2	5	6	294	18th
2022	NASCAR Camping World Truck Series	Kyle Busch Motorsports	16	2	6	10	14th	505
2023	CARS Pro Late Model Tour	Donnie Wilson Motorsports	1	0	1	1	32	41st
2023	NASCAR Craftsman Truck Series	TRICON Garage	22	3	12	19	3994	4th
2023	NASCAR Xfinity Series	Sam Hunt Racing	4	0	0	1	0	NC†
2024	CARS Late Model Stock Car Tour	Lee Pulliam Performance	3	0	1	1	0	NC†
2024	NASCAR Craftsman Truck Series	TRICON Garage	23	6	14	18	4035	**2nd**
2024	NASCAR Xfinity Series	Sam Hunt Racing	13	0	3	4	0	NC†
2024	NASCAR Cup Series	Legacy Motor Club	2	0	0	0	0	NC†
2024	NASCAR Cup Series	23XI Racing	1	0	0	0	0	NC†
2025	ARCA Menards Series	Venturini Motorsports	1	0	1	1	42	89th
2025	NASCAR Craftsman Truck Series	TRICON Garage	25	12	19	21	4040	**1st**
2025	NASCAR Xfinity Series	Sam Hunt Racing	3	0	0	1	0	NC†
2025	NASCAR Cup Series	23XI Racing	4	0	0	1	0	NC†
2026	CARS Late Model Stock Car Tour	Nelson Motorsports	3	0	2	2	97	36th
2026	NASCAR Craftsman Truck Series	TRICON Garage	9	3	5	8	431	17th
2026	NASCAR Cup Series	23XI Racing	13	2	2	4	0	NC†

=== NASCAR ===
(key) (Bold – Pole position awarded by qualifying time. Italics – Pole position earned by points standings or practice time. * – Most laps led. ** – All laps led.)

==== Cup Series ====
NASCAR Cup Series results
Year	Team	No.	Make	1	2	3	4	5	6	7	8	9	10	11	12	13	14	15	16	17	18	19	20	21	22	23	24	25	26	27	28	29	30	31	32	33	34	35	36	NCSC	Pts	Ref
2024	Legacy Motor Club	43	Toyota	DAY	ATL	LVS	PHO	BRI	COA	RCH	MAR	TEX	TAL	DOV; 25	KAN; 22	DAR	CLT	GTW	SON	IOW	NHA																			53rd	0^{1}	
2024	23XI Racing	50	Toyota																			NSH; 29	CSC	POC	IND	RCH	MCH	DAY	DAR	ATL	GLN	BRI	KAN	TAL	ROV	LVS	HOM	MAR	PHO	53rd	0^{1}	
2025	23XI Racing	67	Toyota	DAY	ATL	COA	PHO	LVS	HOM	MAR	DAR	BRI	TAL	TEX	KAN; 13	CLT	NSH; 37	MCH	MXC	POC	ATL	CSC; DNQ	SON	DOV	IND	IOW	GLN	RCH; 29	DAY	DAR	GTW	BRI; 6	NHA	KAN	ROV	LVS	TAL	MAR	PHO	44th	0^{1}	
2026	23XI Racing	67	Toyota	DAY; 28	ATL	COA	PHO	LVS	DAR	MAR	BRI	KAN; 15	TAL	TEX; 31	GLN	CLT; 19	NSH; 25	MCH	POC	COR; 1	SON	CHI; 9	ATL	NWS	IND; 1*	IOW	RCH	NHA	DAY; 16	DAR; 19	GTW	BRI	KAN	LVS	CLT; 11	PHO; 5	TAL	MAR	HOM; 40	42nd	0^{1}	
2027	23XI Racing	67	Toyota	DAY	ATL	COA	PHO	LVS	DAR	BRI	MAR	TAL	TEX	KAN	DOV	CLT	NSH	POC	MCH	CHI	IOW	SON	ATL	IND	COR	BRI	GTW	DAY	DAR	RCH	GLN	NHA	KAN	LVS	CLT	PHO	TAL	MAR	HOM	-*	-*	

===== Daytona 500 =====
Year	Team	Manufacturer	Start	Finish
2026	23XI Racing	Toyota	29	28

==== Xfinity Series ====
NASCAR Xfinity Series results
Year	Team	No.	Make	1	2	3	4	5	6	7	8	9	10	11	12	13	14	15	16	17	18	19	20	21	22	23	24	25	26	27	28	29	30	31	32	33	NXSC	Pts	Ref
2023	Sam Hunt Racing	24	Toyota	DAY	CAL	LVS	PHO	ATL	COA	RCH	MAR	TAL	DOV; 35	DAR; 10	CLT	PIR	SON	NSH	CSC	ATL	NHA	POC; 37	ROA	MCH	IRC	GLN	DAY	DAR; 15	KAN	BRI	TEX	ROV	LVS	HOM	MAR	PHO	88th	0^{1}	
2024	Sam Hunt Racing	26	Toyota	DAY	ATL	LVS; 13	PHO; 22	COA	RCH; 4	MAR; 35	TEX; 17	TAL	DOV; 35	DAR	CLT	PIR	SON	IOW; 3	NHA; 10	NSH	CSC	POC; 16	IND	MCH	DAY	DAR; 25	ATL; 5	GLN	BRI	KAN; 31	TAL	ROV	LVS; 11	HOM	MAR	PHO	82nd	0^{1}	
2025	Sam Hunt Racing	24	Toyota	DAY	ATL	COA; 31	PHO	LVS	HOM; 37	MAR	DAR	BRI; 8	ROC	TAL	TEX	CLT	NSH	MXC	POC	ATL	CSC	SON	DOV	IND	IOW	GLN	DAY	PIR	GTW	BRI	KAN	ROV	LVS	TAL	MAR	PHO	87th	0^{1}	

==== Truck Series ====
NASCAR Truck Series results
Year	Team	No.	Make	1	2	3	4	5	6	7	8	9	10	11	12	13	14	15	16	17	18	19	20	21	22	23	24	25	NCTC	Pts	Ref
2021	Kyle Busch Motorsports	51	Toyota	DAY	DRC	LVS	ATL	BRD	RCH	KAN	DAR; 23	COA	CLT	TEX	NSH	POC	KNX	GLN; 18	GTW	DAR	BRI	LVS	TAL	MAR; 11	PHO				42nd	71	
2022	Kyle Busch Motorsports	51	Toyota	DAY; 32	LVS	ATL; 1	COA	MAR	BRD	DAR; 23	KAN; 33	TEX; 7	CLT	**GTW**; 1	SON	KNX	NSH; 33	**MOH**; 26	POC; 4	IRP; 5	RCH; 5	KAN; 7	BRI; 10	TAL; 26	HOM; 5	PHO; 7			14th	505	
2023	Tricon Garage	11	Toyota	DAY; 8	LVS; 4	ATL; 34	COA; 6	TEX; 7	BRD; 15	MAR; 1*	KAN; 2	**DAR**; 8	**NWS**; 6	CLT; 2*	GTW	NSH; 4*	**MOH**; 1*	POC; 2*	RCH; 6	IRP; 8	MLW; 4	KAN; 4	BRI; 1	TAL; 5	HOM; 3*	**PHO**; 18			4th	3994	
2024	Tricon Garage	11	Toyota	DAY; 2	ATL; 3	LVS; 3	BRI; 6	COA; 1*	MAR; 10	TEX; 2	KAN; 1*	DAR; 28*	NWS; 1*	CLT; 36*	GTW; 1*	NSH; 3	POC; 1*	IRP; 17	RCH; 16	MLW; 7	BRI; 2	KAN; 1*	TAL; 11	**HOM**; 4*	MAR; 7	PHO; 2			2nd	4035	
2025	Tricon Garage	11	Toyota	DAY; 1	ATL; 23	LVS; 1*	**HOM**; 3*	**MAR**; 6*	BRI; 3	ROC; 8*	TEX; 1*	KAN; 3	NWS; 17*	CLT; 1*	NSH; 2	MCH; 18	POC; 23*	**LRP**; 1*	IRP; 3	**GLN**; 1*	**RCH**; 1	DAR; 1	BRI; 3*	**NHA**; 1*	**ROV**; 1	TAL; 2	MAR; 1*	PHO; 1*	1st	4040	
2026	Tricon Garage	1	Toyota	DAY	ATL; 5	STP		ROC; 1*	BRI; 30	TEX	GLN	DOV	CLT	NSH	MCH; 1	COR	LRP									TAL; 10	MAR	HOM; 6	17th	431	
2026	Tricon Garage	5	Toyota				DAR; 1											NWS; 9	IRP	RCH; 2	NHA	BRI	KAN	CLT	PHO				17th	431	

^{*} Season still in progress
^{1} Ineligible for series points

=== ARCA Menards Series ===
(key) (Bold – Pole position awarded by qualifying time. Italics – Pole position earned by points standings or practice time. * – Most laps led. ** – All laps led.)

ARCA Menards Series results
Year	Team	No.	Make	1	2	3	4	5	6	7	8	9	10	11	12	13	14	15	16	17	18	19	20	AMSC	Pts	Ref
2019	Chad Bryant Racing	22	Ford	DAY	FIF; 5	SLM; 5	TAL	NSV; 11	TOL; 10	CLT	POC	MCH	MAD; 10	GTW; 4	CHI	IOW; 5	POC; 6	ELK; 4	ISF; 7	DSF; 3	SLM; 3	IRP; 4	KAN	10th	2615	
2020	Venturini Motorsports	12	Toyota	DAY	PHO	TAL	POC	IRP	KEN	IOW	KAN; 4	TOL	TOL	MCH	DRC	GTW	L44	TOL	BRI	WIN	MEM			28th	123	
2020	Venturini Motorsports	20	Toyota																			ISF; 8		28th	123	
2020	Fast Track Racing	10	Toyota																				KAN; 1*	28th	123	
2021	Venturini Motorsports	20	Toyota	DAY; 1*	PHO; 2	TAL; 1	KAN; 3	TOL; 2	CLT; 2	**MOH**; 7	POC; 1	ELK; 1	BLN; 3	IOW; 4	**WIN**; 3*	GLN; 1*	MCH; 2	**ISF**; 1*	MLW; 6	DSF; 7	BRI; 5	SLM; 7	KAN; 3	2nd	963	
2022	Venturini Motorsports	20	Toyota	**DAY**; 1*	PHO	TAL; 3	**KAN**; 16*	CLT; 2	IOW	BLN	ELK	MOH	POC	IRP	**MCH**; 2	GLN	ISF	MLW		**KAN**; 1*	BRI	SLM	TOL	18th	294	
2022	Venturini Motorsports	15	Toyota																DSF; 9					18th	294	
2025	Venturini Motorsports	25	Toyota	DAY	PHO	TAL	KAN	CLT	MCH; 2	BLN	ELK	LRP	DOV	IRP	IOW	GLN	ISF	MAD	DSF	BRI	SLM	KAN	TOL	89th	42	

==== ARCA Menards Series East ====
ARCA Menards Series East results
Year	Team	No.	Make	1	2	3	4	5	6	7	8	AMSEC	Pts	Ref
2020	Venturini Motorsports	20	Toyota	NSM; 7	TOL	DOV; 6	TOL	BRI	FIF; 2			9th	167	
2021	Venturini Motorsports	20	Toyota	NSM	FIF	NSV	DOV	SNM	IOW; 4	MLW; 6	BRI; 5	12th	167	

==== ARCA Menards Series West ====
ARCA Menards Series West results
Year	Team	No.	Make	1	2	3	4	5	6	7	8	9	10	11	12	13	14	AMSWC	Pts	Ref
2019	Chad Bryant Racing	22	Ford	LVS	IRW	TUS	TUS	CNS	SON	DCS	IOW	EVG	GTW	MER	AAS	KCR	PHO; 25	65th	19	
2020	Venturini Motorsports	20	Toyota	LVS	MMP	MMP	IRW	EVG	DCS	CNS	LVS	AAS	KCR	PHO; 8				23rd	86	
2021	Venturini Motorsports	20	Toyota	PHO; 2	SON	IRW	CNS	IRW	PIR	LVS	AAS	PHO						36th	43	

=== CARS Late Model Stock Car Tour ===
(key) (Bold – Pole position awarded by qualifying time. Italics – Pole position earned by points standings or practice time. * – Most laps led. ** – All laps led.)

CARS Late Model Stock Car Tour results
Year	Team	No.	Make	1	2	3	4	5	6	7	8	9	10	11	12	13	14	15	16	17	CLMSCTC	Pts	Ref
2019	Lee Pulliam Performance	78	Chevy	SNM	HCY	ROU; 17	ACE	MMS	LGY; 17	DOM	CCS	HCY	ROU	SBO; 3							26th	62	
2020	Lee Pulliam Performance	78	Chevy	SNM; 15	ACE; 8	**HCY**; 1*	HCY; 8	DOM; 15	FCS; 5	**LGY**; 2*	CCS; 2	FLO; 6	GRE; 2								3rd	275	
2022	Lee Pulliam Performance	78	Toyota	CRW; 5	HCY	GRE; 5	AAS	FCS	LGY	DOM	HCY	ACE	MMS	NWS; 27	TCM	ACE	SBO	CRW			32nd	63	
2024	Lee Pulliam Performance	55	Toyota	SNM	HCY	AAS	OCS	ACE	TCM	LGY	DOM	CRW; 24	HCY	NWS; 2	ACE	WCS	FLC	SBO	**TCM**; 18*	NWS	N/A	0	
2026	Nelson Motorsports	12	Toyota	SNM	WCS	NSV	CRW	ACE; 5	LGY	DOM	NWS; 2										36th	97	
2026	Nelson Motorsports	22	Toyota									HCY; 25*	AND	FLC	TCM	NPS	SBO				36th	97	

=== CARS Super Late Model Tour ===
(key)

CARS Super Late Model Tour results
Year	Team	No.	Make	1	2	3	4	5	6	7	8	9	CSLMTC	Pts	Ref
2018	Ray Heim	78	Toyota	MYB; 7	NSH; 11	ROU; 24	HCY; 8	BRI; 3	AND; 12		ROU; 2	SBO; 1	2nd	224	
2018	Ray Heim	28	Ford							HCY; 8			2nd	224	
2019	Ray Heim	78	Ford	SNM	HCY; 4	NSH	MMS	BRI; 7					8th	137	
2019	Ray Heim	17H	Chevy						HCY; 7				8th	137	
2019	Ray Heim	78	Chevy							ROU; 4	SBO; 2		8th	137	
2020	Ray Heim	78	Toyota	SNM	HCY	JEN; 6	HCY	FCS			NSH; 18		13th	57	
2020	Ray Heim	78H	Chevy						BRI; 19	FLC			13th	57	
2021	Ray Heim	78	Toyota	HCY	GPS	NSH	JEN; 2	HCY	MMS	TCM	SBO		20th	32	

=== CARS Pro Late Model Tour ===
(key)

CARS Pro Late Model Tour results
Year	Team	No.	Make	1	2	3	4	5	6	7	8	9	10	11	12	13	CPLMTC	Pts	Ref
2023	Donnie Wilson Motorsports	28	Toyota	SNM	HCY	ACE	NWS; 2	TCM	DIL	CRW	WKS	HCY	TCM	SBO	TCM	CRW	41st	32	
2024	Donnie Wilson Motorsports	20	Toyota	SNM	HCY	OCS	ACE	TCM	CRW	HCY	NWS; 2	ACE	FLC	SBO	TCM	NWS	N/A	0	
2026	Bryson Lopez Racing	78	Toyota	SNM	NSV	CRW	ACE	NWS; 26	HCY	AND	FLC	TCM	NPS	SBO			78th	16	

Sporting positions
Achievements
Preceded by Bubba Wallace	Brickyard 400 winner 2026	Succeeded by incumbent
