= 2024 Würth 400 =

NASCAR Cup Series race

Race details
- Race 11 of 36 in the 2024 NASCAR Cup Series
- Date: April 28, 2024
- Location: Dover Motor Speedway in Dover, Delaware
- Course: Permanent racing facility
- Course length: 1 miles (1.6 km)
- Distance: 400 laps, 400 mi (640 km)
- Average speed: 119.433 miles per hour (192.209 km/h)

Pole position
Driver	Kyle Busch	Richard Childress Racing
- Time: 22.196

Most laps led
Driver	Denny Hamlin	Joe Gibbs Racing
- Laps: 136

Winner
No. 11	Denny Hamlin	Joe Gibbs Racing

Television in the United States
- Network: FS1
- Announcers: Mike Joy, Clint Bowyer, and Kevin Harvick

Radio in the United States
- Radio: PRN
- Booth announcers: Doug Rice and Mark Garrow
- Turn announcers: Pat Patterson (Backstretch)

The 2024 Würth 400 was a NASCAR Cup Series race held on April 28, 2024, at Dover Motor Speedway in Dover, Delaware. Contested over 400 laps on the 1-mile (1.6 km) concrete speedway, it was the 11th race of the 2024 NASCAR Cup Series season. Denny Hamlin won the race. Kyle Larson finished 2nd, and Martin Truex Jr. finished 3rd. Kyle Busch and Chase Elliott rounded out the top five, and Noah Gragson, Ryan Blaney, Alex Bowman, Daniel Hemric, and Ty Gibbs rounded out the top ten.

== Report ==
=== Background ===
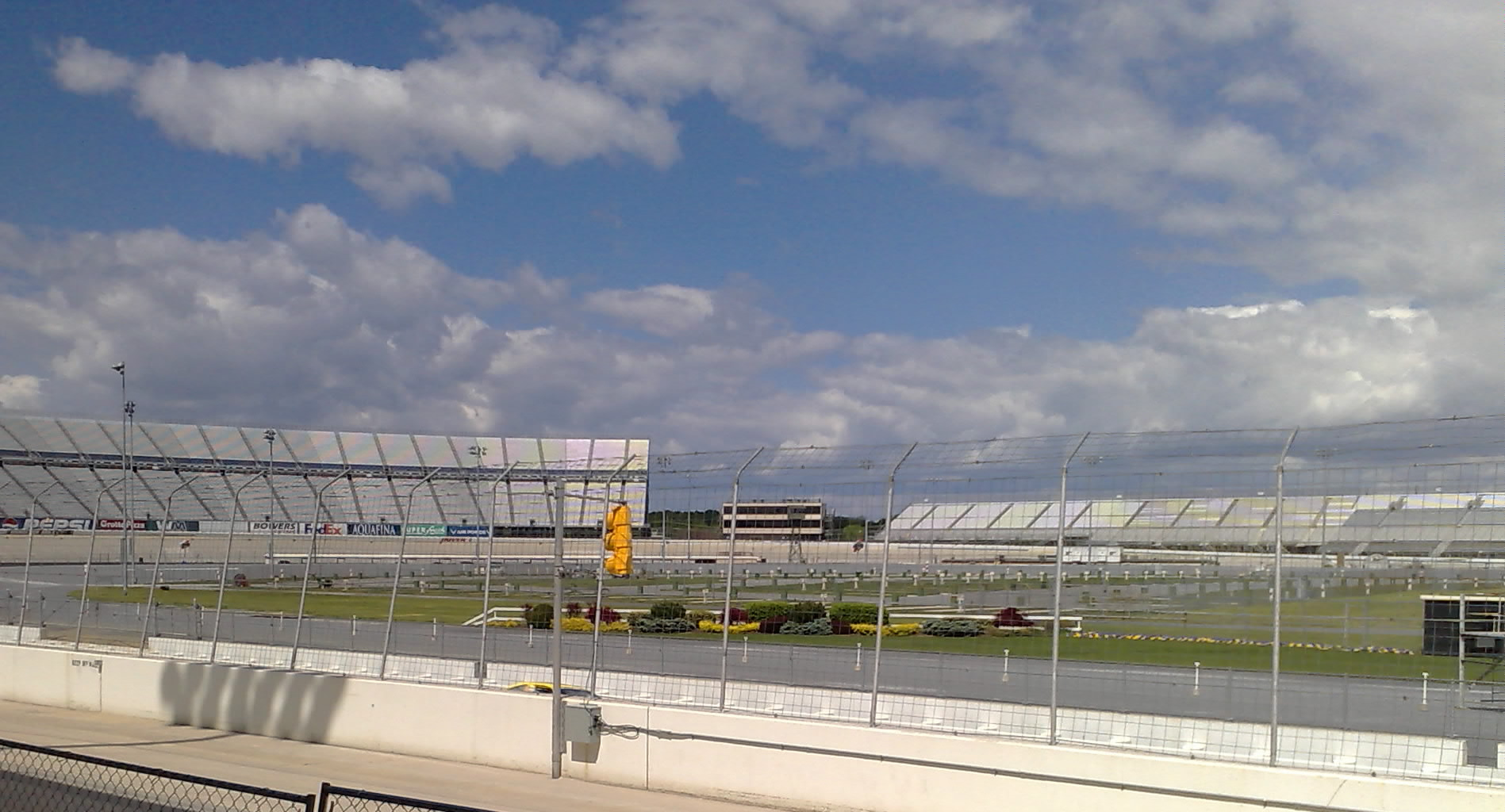
Dover Motor Speedway, the track where the race was held.

Dover Motor Speedway is an oval race track in Dover, Delaware, United States that has held at least two NASCAR races since it opened in 1969. In addition to NASCAR, the track also hosted USAC and the NTT IndyCar Series. The track features one layout, a 1 mile (1.6 km) concrete oval, with 24° banking in the turns and 9° banking on the straights. The speedway is owned and operated by Speedway Motorsports.

The track, nicknamed "The Monster Mile", was built in 1969 by Melvin Joseph of Melvin L. Joseph Construction Company, Inc., with an asphalt surface, but was replaced with concrete in 1995. Six years later in 2001, the track's capacity moved to 135,000 seats, making the track have the largest capacity of sports venue in the mid-Atlantic. In 2002, the name changed to Dover International Speedway from Dover Downs International Speedway after Dover Downs Gaming and Entertainment split, making Dover Motorsports. From 2007 to 2009, the speedway worked on an improvement project called "The Monster Makeover", which expanded facilities at the track and beautified the track. After the 2014 season, the track's capacity was reduced to 95,500 seats.

==== Entry list ====
- (R) denotes rookie driver.
- (i) denotes driver who is ineligible for series driver points.

No.	Driver	Team	Manufacturer
1	Ross Chastain	Trackhouse Racing	Chevrolet
2	Austin Cindric	Team Penske	Ford
3	Austin Dillon	Richard Childress Racing	Chevrolet
4	Josh Berry (R)	Stewart–Haas Racing	Ford
5	Kyle Larson	Hendrick Motorsports	Chevrolet
6	Brad Keselowski	RFK Racing	Ford
7	Corey LaJoie	Spire Motorsports	Chevrolet
8	Kyle Busch	Richard Childress Racing	Chevrolet
9	Chase Elliott	Hendrick Motorsports	Chevrolet
10	Noah Gragson	Stewart–Haas Racing	Ford
11	Denny Hamlin	Joe Gibbs Racing	Toyota
12	Ryan Blaney	Team Penske	Ford
14	Chase Briscoe	Stewart–Haas Racing	Ford
15	Kaz Grala (R)	Rick Ware Racing	Ford
16	A. J. Allmendinger (i)	Kaulig Racing	Chevrolet
17	Chris Buescher	RFK Racing	Ford
19	Martin Truex Jr.	Joe Gibbs Racing	Toyota
20	Christopher Bell	Joe Gibbs Racing	Toyota
21	Harrison Burton	Wood Brothers Racing	Ford
22	Joey Logano	Team Penske	Ford
23	Bubba Wallace	23XI Racing	Toyota
24	William Byron	Hendrick Motorsports	Chevrolet
31	Daniel Hemric	Kaulig Racing	Chevrolet
34	Michael McDowell	Front Row Motorsports	Ford
38	Todd Gilliland	Front Row Motorsports	Ford
41	Ryan Preece	Stewart–Haas Racing	Ford
42	John Hunter Nemechek	Legacy Motor Club	Toyota
43	Corey Heim (i) (Note: Corey Heim replaced Erik Jones after Jones sustained a spinal fracture in a wreck the previous race at Talladega Superspeedway.)	Legacy Motor Club	Toyota
45	Tyler Reddick	23XI Racing	Toyota
47	Ricky Stenhouse Jr.	JTG Daugherty Racing	Chevrolet
48	Alex Bowman	Hendrick Motorsports	Chevrolet
51	Justin Haley	Rick Ware Racing	Ford
54	Ty Gibbs	Joe Gibbs Racing	Toyota
71	Zane Smith (R)	Spire Motorsports	Chevrolet
77	Carson Hocevar (R)	Spire Motorsports	Chevrolet
84	Jimmie Johnson	Legacy Motor Club	Toyota
99	Daniel Suárez	Trackhouse Racing	Chevrolet
Official entry list

== Practice ==
Ryan Blaney was the fastest in the practice session with a time of 22.575 seconds and a speed of 159.468 mph (256.639 km/h).

=== Practice results ===
Pos	No.	Driver	Team	Manufacturer	Time	Speed
1	12	Ryan Blaney	Team Penske	Ford	22.575	159.468
2	45	Tyler Reddick	23XI Racing	Toyota	22.644	158.983
3	24	William Byron	Hendrick Motorsports	Chevrolet	22.648	158.954
Official practice results

== Qualifying ==
Kyle Busch scored the pole for the race with a time of 22.196 and a speed of 162.191 mph (261.021 km/h).

=== Qualifying results ===
Pos	No.	Driver	Team	Manufacturer	R1	R2
1	8	Kyle Busch	Richard Childress Racing	Chevrolet	22.276	22.196
2	12	Ryan Blaney	Team Penske	Ford	22.069	22.229
3	24	William Byron	Hendrick Motorsports	Chevrolet	22.107	22.293
4	45	Tyler Reddick	23XI Racing	Toyota	22.134	22.328
5	10	Noah Gragson	Stewart-Haas Racing	Ford	22.253	22.400
6	11	Denny Hamlin	Joe Gibbs Racing	Toyota	22.174	22.448
7	14	Chase Briscoe	Stewart-Haas Racing	Ford	22.169	22.544
8	34	Michael McDowell	Front Row Motorsports	Ford	22.155	22.629
9	48	Alex Bowman	Hendrick Motorsports	Chevrolet	22.164	22.636
10	16	A. J. Allmendinger (i)	Kaulig Racing	Chevrolet	22.250	22.758
11	2	Austin Cindric	Team Penske	Ford	22.217	—
12	4	Josh Berry (R)	Stewart-Haas Racing	Ford	22.288	—
13	22	Joey Logano	Team Penske	Ford	22.218	—
14	31	Daniel Hemric	Kaulig Racing	Chevrolet	22.300	—
15	19	Martin Truex Jr.	Joe Gibbs Racing	Toyota	22.289	—
16	23	Bubba Wallace	23XI Racing	Toyota	22.325	—
17	47	Ricky Stenhouse Jr.	JTG Daugherty Racing	Chevrolet	22.291	—
18	17	Chris Buescher	RFK Racing	Ford	22.346	—
19	54	Ty Gibbs	Joe Gibbs Racing	Toyota	22.298	—
20	77	Carson Hocevar (R)	Spire Motorsports	Chevrolet	22.374	—
21	5	Kyle Larson	Hendrick Motorsports	Chevrolet	22.333	—
22	1	Ross Chastain	Trackhouse Racing	Chevrolet	22.407	—
23	3	Austin Dillon	Richard Childress Racing	Chevrolet	22.364	—
24	6	Brad Keselowski	RFK Racing	Ford	22.420	—
25	7	Corey LaJoie	Spire Motorsports	Chevrolet	22.421	—
26	21	Harrison Burton	Wood Brothers Racing	Ford	22.487	—
27	84	Jimmie Johnson	Legacy Motor Club	Toyota	22.424	—
28	41	Ryan Preece	Stewart-Haas Racing	Ford	22.512	—
29	9	Chase Elliott	Hendrick Motorsports	Chevrolet	22.513	—
30	38	Todd Gilliland	Front Row Motorsports	Ford	22.559	—
31	99	Daniel Suárez	Trackhouse Racing	Chevrolet	22.546	—
32	43	Corey Heim (i)	Legacy Motor Club	Toyota	22.595	—
33	20	Christopher Bell	Joe Gibbs Racing	Toyota	0.000	—
34	42	John Hunter Nemechek	Legacy Motor Club	Toyota	22.609	—
35	15	Kaz Grala (R)	Rick Ware Racing	Ford	0.000	—
36	51	Justin Haley	Rick Ware Racing	Ford	22.747	—
37	71	Zane Smith (R)	Spire Motorsports	Chevrolet	0.000	—
Official qualifying results

== Race ==
=== Race results ===
==== Stage Results ====
Stage One Laps: 120

Pos	No	Driver	Team	Manufacturer	Points
1	19	Martin Truex Jr.	Joe Gibbs Racing	Toyota	10
2	24	William Byron	Hendrick Motorsports	Chevrolet	9
3	45	Tyler Reddick	23XI Racing	Toyota	8
4	12	Ryan Blaney	Team Penske	Ford	7
5	5	Kyle Larson	Hendrick Motorsports	Chevrolet	6
6	11	Denny Hamlin	Joe Gibbs Racing	Toyota	5
7	8	Kyle Busch	Richard Childress Racing	Chevrolet	4
8	48	Alex Bowman	Hendrick Motorsports	Chevrolet	3
9	9	Chase Elliott	Hendrick Motorsports	Chevrolet	2
10	47	Ricky Stenhouse Jr.	JTG Daugherty Racing	Chevrolet	1
Official stage one results

Stage Two Laps: 130

Pos	No	Driver	Team	Manufacturer	Points
1	5	Kyle Larson	Hendrick Motorsports	Chevrolet	10
2	48	Alex Bowman	Hendrick Motorsports	Chevrolet	9
3	11	Denny Hamlin	Joe Gibbs Racing	Toyota	8
4	19	Martin Truex Jr.	Joe Gibbs Racing	Toyota	7
5	9	Chase Elliott	Hendrick Motorsports	Chevrolet	6
6	8	Kyle Busch	Richard Childress Racing	Chevrolet	5
7	45	Tyler Reddick	23XI Racing	Toyota	4
8	12	Ryan Blaney	Team Penske	Ford	3
9	47	Ricky Stenhouse Jr.	JTG Daugherty Racing	Chevrolet	2
10	23	Bubba Wallace	23XI Racing	Toyota	1
Official stage two results

=== Final Stage Results ===
Stage Three Laps: 150

Pos	Grid	No	Driver	Team	Manufacturer	Laps	Points
1	6	11	Denny Hamlin	Joe Gibbs Racing	Toyota	400	53
2	21	5	Kyle Larson	Hendrick Motorsports	Chevrolet	400	51
3	15	19	Martin Truex Jr.	Joe Gibbs Racing	Toyota	400	51
4	1	8	Kyle Busch	Richard Childress Racing	Chevrolet	400	42
5	29	9	Chase Elliott	Hendrick Motorsports	Chevrolet	400	40
6	5	10	Noah Gragson	Stewart-Haas Racing	Ford	400	31
7	2	12	Ryan Blaney	Team Penske	Ford	400	40
8	9	48	Alex Bowman	Hendrick Motorsports	Chevrolet	400	41
9	14	31	Daniel Hemric	Kaulig Racing	Chevrolet	400	28
10	19	54	Ty Gibbs	Joe Gibbs Racing	Toyota	400	27
11	4	45	Tyler Reddick	23XI Racing	Toyota	400	38
12	22	1	Ross Chastain	Trackhouse Racing	Chevrolet	400	25
13	10	16	A. J. Allmendinger (i)	Kaulig Racing	Chevrolet	400	0
14	12	4	Josh Berry (R)	Stewart-Haas Racing	Ford	400	23
15	11	2	Austin Cindric	Team Penske	Ford	400	22
16	13	22	Joey Logano	Team Penske	Ford	400	21
17	18	17	Chris Buescher	RFK Racing	Ford	400	20
18	31	99	Daniel Suárez	Trackhouse Racing	Chevrolet	399	19
19	7	14	Chase Briscoe	Stewart-Haas Racing	Ford	399	18
20	34	42	John Hunter Nemechek	Legacy Motor Club	Toyota	398	17
21	25	7	Corey LaJoie	Spire Motorsports	Chevrolet	398	16
22	20	77	Carson Hocevar (R)	Spire Motorsports	Chevrolet	397	15
23	36	51	Justin Haley	Rick Ware Racing	Ford	397	14
24	37	71	Zane Smith (R)	Spire Motorsports	Chevrolet	397	13
25	32	43	Corey Heim (i)	Legacy Motor Club	Toyota	397	0
26	26	21	Harrison Burton	Wood Brothers Racing	Ford	397	11
27	23	3	Austin Dillon	Richard Childress Racing	Chevrolet	396	10
28	27	84	Jimmie Johnson	Legacy Motor Club	Toyota	395	9
29	35	15	Kaz Grala (R)	Rick Ware Racing	Ford	394	8
30	24	6	Brad Keselowski	RFK Racing	Ford	383	7
31	30	38	Todd Gilliland	Front Row Motorsports	Ford	379	6
32	16	23	Bubba Wallace	23XI Racing	Toyota	329	6
33	3	24	William Byron	Hendrick Motorsports	Chevrolet	329	13
34	33	20	Christopher Bell	Joe Gibbs Racing	Toyota	328	3
35	17	47	Ricky Stenhouse Jr.	JTG Daugherty Racing	Chevrolet	320	5
36	8	34	Michael McDowell	Front Row Motorsports	Ford	285	1
37	28	41	Ryan Preece	Stewart-Haas Racing	Ford	66	1
Official race results

=== Race statistics ===
- Lead changes: 12 among 9 different drivers
- Cautions/Laps: 5 for 42 laps
- Red flags: 0
- Time of race: 3 hours, 20 minutes and 57 seconds
- Average speed: 119.433 miles per hour (192.209 km/h)

== Media ==
=== Television ===
Fox Sports covered the race on the television side. Mike Joy, Clint Bowyer and three-time Dover winner Kevin Harvick called the race from the broadcast booth. Jamie Little and Regan Smith handled pit road for the television side, and Larry McReynolds provided insight from the Fox Sports studio in Charlotte.

FS1
Booth announcers	Pit reporters	In-race analyst
Lap-by-lap: Mike Joy; Color-commentator: Clint Bowyer; Color-commentator: Kevin Harvick	Jamie Little; Regan Smith	Larry McReynolds

=== Radio ===
PRN had the radio call for the race and was also simulcasted on Sirius XM NASCAR Radio. Doug Rice & Mark Garrow called the race from the broadcast booth when the field raced down the front straightaway. Pat Patterson called the race from atop a scaffold when the field raced thru turns 3 & 4. Brad Gillie, Brett McMillan, and Wendy Venturini called the race for PRN from pit lane.

PRN
Booth announcers	Turn announcers	Pit reporters
Lead announcer: Doug Rice; Announcer: Mark Garrow	Backstretch: Pat Patterson	Brad Gillie; Brett McMillan; Wendy Venturini

== Standings after the race ==
Drivers' Championship standings

	Pos	Driver	Points
	1	Kyle Larson	410
	2	Martin Truex Jr.	395 (–15)
	3	Chase Elliott	377 (–33)
2	4	Denny Hamlin	361 (–49)
	5	Tyler Reddick	354 (–56)
2	6	William Byron	348 (–62)
	7	Ryan Blaney	342 (–68)
	8	Ty Gibbs	323 (–87)
1	9	Alex Bowman	302 (–108)
1	10	Ross Chastain	302 (–108)
6	11	Kyle Busch	275 (–135)
	12	Chase Briscoe	274 (–136)
2	13	Joey Logano	266 (–144)
2	14	Chris Buescher	265 (–145)
4	15	Bubba Wallace	263 (–147)
2	16	Brad Keselowski	261 (–149)
Official driver's standings

Manufacturers' Championship standings

Pos	Manufacturer	Points
1	Chevrolet	406
2	Toyota	402 (–4)
3	Ford	363 (–43)

- Note: Only the first 16 positions are included for the driver standings.
- . – Driver has clinched a position in the NASCAR Cup Series playoffs.

== Notes ==
Previous race: 2024 GEICO 500	NASCAR Cup Series; 2024 season	Next race: 2024 AdventHealth 400
