= 2023 Buckle Up South Carolina 200 =

9th race of the 2023 NASCAR Craftsman Truck Series

Race details
- Race 9 of 23 of the 2023 NASCAR Craftsman Truck Series
- Date: May 12, 2023
- Official name: 4th Annual Buckle Up South Carolina 200
- Location: Darlington Raceway, Darlington, South Carolina
- Course: Permanent racing facility
- Course length: 1.366 miles (2.198 km)
- Distance: 158 laps, 215 mi (346 km)
- Scheduled distance: 147 laps, 200 mi (323 km)
- Average speed: 105.539 mph (169.849 km/h)

Pole position
Driver	Corey Heim	Tricon Garage
- Time: 29.263

Most laps led
Driver	Christian Eckes	McAnally-Hilgemann Racing
- Laps: 82

Winner
No. 19	Christian Eckes	McAnally-Hilgemann Racing

Television in the United States
- Network: FS1
- Announcers: Jamie Little, Phil Parsons, and Michael Waltrip

Radio in the United States
- Radio: MRN

The 2023 Buckle Up South Carolina 200 was the 9th stock car race of the 2023 NASCAR Craftsman Truck Series, and the eleventh Truck Series race at Darlington. The race was held on Friday, May 12, 2023, in Darlington, South Carolina at Darlington Raceway, a 1.366 miles (2.198 km) permanent egg-shaped racetrack. The race was increased from 147 to 158 laps, due to several NASCAR overtime attempts. Christian Eckes, driving for McAnally-Hilgemann Racing, would capture the win after leading when the final caution came out on the last lap. This was Eckes' third career NASCAR Craftsman Truck Series win, and his second of the season. Eckes and pole-sitter Corey Heim had dominated the entire race, leading 82 and 66 laps, respectively. To fill out the podium, Stewart Friesen, driving for Halmar Friesen Racing, and Tanner Gray, driving for Tricon Garage, would finish 2nd and 3rd, respectively.

== Background ==
Darlington Raceway is a race track built for NASCAR racing located near Darlington, South Carolina. It is nicknamed "The Lady in Black" and "The Track Too Tough to Tame" by many NASCAR fans and drivers and advertised as "A NASCAR Tradition." It is of a unique, somewhat egg-shaped design, an oval with the ends of very different configurations, a condition which supposedly arose from the proximity of one end of the track to a minnow pond the owner refused to relocate. This situation makes it very challenging for the crews to set up their cars' handling in a way that is effective at both ends.

=== Entry list ===
- (R) denotes rookie driver.
- (i) denotes driver who is ineligible for series driver points.

#	Driver	Team	Make	Sponsor or throwback
1	Bubba Wallace (i)	Tricon Garage	Toyota	Annie Bosko
02	Kris Wright	Young's Motorsports	Chevrolet	WrightCars.com - Juan Pablo Montoya's 2007 No. 42 Texaco/Havoline paint scheme
2	Nick Sanchez (R)	Rev Racing	Chevrolet	Gainbridge - Mario Andretti's 1967 Daytona 500 winning paint scheme
04	Johnny Sauter	Roper Racing	Ford	Roper Racing, Carquest - Jason Leffler's 2003 No. 2 Team ASE/Hulk paint scheme
4	Chase Purdy	Kyle Busch Motorsports	Chevrolet	Bama Buggies
5	Dean Thompson	Tricon Garage	Toyota	Thompson Pipe Group - Germán Quiroga's 2013 No. 77 Net 10 Wireless paint scheme
7	Corey LaJoie (i)	Spire Motorsports	Chevrolet	Schluter Systems
9	Colby Howard	CR7 Motorsports	Chevrolet	Grant County Mulch
11	Corey Heim	Tricon Garage	Toyota	Safelite - Timothy Peters' 2014 No. 17 Red Horse Racing paint scheme
12	Spencer Boyd	Young's Motorsports	Chevrolet	Sad Daddy Hunting Blinds
13	Hailie Deegan	ThorSport Racing	Ford	Ford Performance
15	Tanner Gray	Tricon Garage	Toyota	Black's Tire Service
16	Tyler Ankrum	Hattori Racing Enterprises	Toyota	LiUNA!
17	Taylor Gray (R)	Tricon Garage	Toyota	Dead On Tools - Todd Bodine's 2012 No. 11 Toyota Endeavour paint scheme
19	Christian Eckes	McAnally-Hilgemann Racing	Chevrolet	Gates Hydraulics - Hershel McGriff's 1950 Southern 500 paint scheme
20	Kaden Honeycutt	Young's Motorsports	Chevrolet	Young's Motorsports
23	Grant Enfinger	GMS Racing	Chevrolet	Champion Power Equipment
24	Rajah Caruth (R)	GMS Racing	Chevrolet	Wendell Scott Foundation - Wendell Scott's 1973 Winston 500 paint scheme
25	Matt DiBenedetto	Rackley WAR	Chevrolet	Rackley Roofing
30	Ryan Vargas	On Point Motorsports	Toyota	KSDT CPA - Sean Woodside's 2000 No. 31 Brevak Racing paint scheme
32	Bret Holmes (R)	Bret Holmes Racing	Chevrolet	Bret Holmes Racing
33	Josh Reaume	Reaume Brothers Racing	Ford	Colonial Countertops, Motorsports Safety Group - Ken Block's No. 43 Gymkhana paint scheme
35	Jake Garcia (R)	McAnally-Hilgemann Racing	Chevrolet	Crown Fiber - Buckshot Jones' 1999 No. 00 Crown Fiber paint scheme
38	Zane Smith	Front Row Motorsports	Ford	rtatel.com
41	Ross Chastain (i)	Niece Motorsports	Chevrolet	Worldwide Express - Lee Petty's 1964 No. 41 Petty Enterprises paint scheme
42	Carson Hocevar	Niece Motorsports	Chevrolet	Worldwide Express, UPS - Dale Jarrett's 2001 No. 88 UPS "We Want To Race The Truck" paint scheme
43	Daniel Dye (R)	GMS Racing	Chevrolet	Race to Stop Suicide - Richard Petty's 1976 No. 43 STP paint scheme
45	Lawless Alan	Niece Motorsports	Chevrolet	AUTOParkIt.com - Adam Petty's 1999 No. 45 Spree paint scheme
46	Brennan Poole (i)	G2G Racing	Toyota	G2G Racing
47	Dawson Cram (i)	G2G Racing	Toyota	G2G Racing
51	William Byron (i)	Kyle Busch Motorsports	Chevrolet	HendrickCars.com
52	Stewart Friesen	Halmar Friesen Racing	Toyota	Halmar International - Tribute to dirt modified legend Ivan Little
56	Timmy Hill	Hill Motorsports	Toyota	UNITS Storage - Ted Musgrave's 2003 No. 1 Mopar paint scheme
75	Parker Kligerman (i)	Henderson Motorsports	Chevrolet	Häagen-Dazs
88	Matt Crafton	ThorSport Racing	Ford	Ideal Door, Menards
98	Ty Majeski	ThorSport Racing	Ford	Tenda, Curb Records
99	Ben Rhodes	ThorSport Racing	Ford	Farm Paint
Official entry list

== Practice ==
The first and only practice session was held on Friday, May 12, at 3:05 PM EST, and would last for 20 minutes. Nick Sanchez, driving for Rev Racing, would set the fastest time in the session, with a lap of 29.301, and an average speed of 167.830 mph (270.096 km/h).

Pos.	#	Driver	Team	Make	Time	Speed
1	2	Nick Sanchez (R)	Rev Racing	Chevrolet	29.301	167.830
2	88	Matt Crafton	ThorSport Racing	Ford	29.612	166.068
3	42	Carson Hocevar	Niece Motorsports	Chevrolet	29.711	165.514
Full practice results

== Qualifying ==
Qualifying was held on Saturday, May 12, at 3:35 PM EST. Since Darlington Raceway is an intermediate racetrack, the qualifying system used is a single-car, single-lap system with only one round. In that round, whoever sets the fastest time will win the pole. Corey Heim, driving for Tricon Garage, would score the pole for the race, with a lap of 29.263, and an average speed of 168.048 mph (270.447 km/h).

Pos.	#	Driver	Team	Make	Time	Speed
1	11	Corey Heim	Tricon Garage	Toyota	29.263	168.048
2	23	Grant Enfinger	GMS Racing	Chevrolet	29.322	167.710
3	2	Nick Sanchez (R)	Rev Racing	Chevrolet	29.328	167.676
4	19	Christian Eckes	McAnally-Hilgemann Racing	Chevrolet	29.412	167.197
5	35	Jake Garcia (R)	McAnally-Hilgemann Racing	Chevrolet	29.428	167.106
6	52	Stewart Friesen	Halmar Friesen Racing	Toyota	29.483	166.794
7	25	Matt DiBenedetto	Rackley WAR	Chevrolet	29.485	166.783
8	51	William Byron (i)	Kyle Busch Motorsports	Chevrolet	29.497	166.715
9	98	Ty Majeski	ThorSport Racing	Ford	29.524	166.563
10	4	Chase Purdy	Kyle Busch Motorsports	Chevrolet	29.553	166.399
11	15	Tanner Gray	Tricon Garage	Toyota	29.591	166.186
12	17	Taylor Gray (R)	Tricon Garage	Toyota	29.622	166.012
13	24	Rajah Caruth (R)	GMS Racing	Chevrolet	29.635	165.939
14	99	Ben Rhodes	ThorSport Racing	Ford	29.640	165.911
15	1	Bubba Wallace (i)	Tricon Garage	Toyota	29.653	165.838
16	41	Ross Chastain (i)	Niece Motorsports	Chevrolet	29.730	165.409
17	16	Tyler Ankrum	Hattori Racing Enterprises	Toyota	29.767	165.203
18	42	Carson Hocevar	Niece Motorsports	Chevrolet	29.815	164.937
19	88	Matt Crafton	ThorSport Racing	Ford	29.826	164.876
20	43	Daniel Dye (R)	GMS Racing	Chevrolet	29.860	164.689
21	75	Parker Kligerman (i)	Henderson Motorsports	Chevrolet	30.004	163.898
22	38	Zane Smith	Front Row Motorsports	Ford	30.023	163.794
23	56	Timmy Hill	Hill Motorsports	Toyota	30.055	163.620
24	20	Kaden Honeycutt	Young's Motorsports	Chevrolet	30.072	163.528
25	5	Dean Thompson	Tricon Garage	Toyota	30.148	163.115
26	13	Hailie Deegan	ThorSport Racing	Ford	30.255	162.538
27	04	Johnny Sauter	Roper Racing	Ford	30.322	162.179
28	46	Brennan Poole (i)	G2G Racing	Toyota	30.337	162.099
29	7	Corey LaJoie (i)	Spire Motorsports	Chevrolet	30.405	161.737
30	45	Lawless Alan	Niece Motorsports	Chevrolet	30.466	161.413
31	47	Dawson Cram (i)	G2G Racing	Toyota	30.632	160.538
Qualified by owner's points
32	30	Ryan Vargas	On Point Motorsports	Toyota	30.853	159.388
33	12	Spencer Boyd	Young's Motorsports	Chevrolet	30.907	159.110
34	32	Bret Holmes (R)	Bret Holmes Racing	Chevrolet	31.325	156.986
35	02	Kris Wright	Young's Motorsports	Chevrolet	32.001	153.670
36	9	Colby Howard	CR7 Motorsports	Chevrolet	–	–
Failed to qualify
37	33	Josh Reaume	Reaume Brothers Racing	Ford	31.639	155.428
Official qualifying results
Official starting lineup

== Race results ==
Stage 1 Laps: 45

Pos.	#	Driver	Team	Make	Pts
1	19	Christian Eckes	McAnally-Hilgemann Racing	Chevrolet	10
2	11	Corey Heim	Tricon Garage	Toyota	9
3	25	Matt DiBenedetto	Rackley WAR	Chevrolet	8
4	51	William Byron (i)	Kyle Busch Motorsports	Chevrolet	0
5	23	Grant Enfinger	GMS Racing	Chevrolet	6
6	42	Carson Hocevar	Niece Motorsports	Chevrolet	5
7	52	Stewart Friesen	Halmar Friesen Racing	Toyota	4
8	1	Bubba Wallace (i)	Tricon Garage	Toyota	0
9	2	Nick Sanchez (R)	Rev Racing	Chevrolet	2
10	4	Chase Purdy	Kyle Busch Motorsports	Chevrolet	1

Stage 2 Laps: 45

Pos.	#	Driver	Team	Make	Pts
1	51	William Byron (i)	Kyle Busch Motorsports	Chevrolet	0
2	11	Corey Heim	Tricon Garage	Toyota	9
3	19	Christian Eckes	McAnally-Hilgemann Racing	Chevrolet	8
4	42	Carson Hocevar	Niece Motorsports	Chevrolet	7
5	1	Bubba Wallace (i)	Tricon Garage	Toyota	0
6	35	Jake Garcia (R)	McAnally-Hilgemann Racing	Chevrolet	5
7	52	Stewart Friesen	Halmar Friesen Racing	Toyota	4
8	23	Grant Enfinger	GMS Racing	Chevrolet	3
9	56	Timmy Hill	Hill Motorsports	Toyota	2
10	17	Taylor Gray (R)	Tricon Garage	Toyota	1

Stage 3 Laps: 68

Fin	St	#	Driver	Team	Make	Laps	Led	Status	Pts
1	4	19	Christian Eckes	McAnally-Hilgemann Racing	Chevrolet	158	82	Running	58
2	6	52	Stewart Friesen	Halmar Friesen Racing	Toyota	158	0	Running	43
3	11	15	Tanner Gray	Tricon Garage	Toyota	158	0	Running	34
4	8	51	William Byron (i)	Kyle Busch Motorsports	Chevrolet	158	7	Running	0
5	18	42	Carson Hocevar	Niece Motorsports	Chevrolet	158	0	Running	44
6	13	24	Rajah Caruth (R)	GMS Racing	Chevrolet	158	0	Running	31
7	15	1	Bubba Wallace (i)	Tricon Garage	Toyota	158	0	Running	0
8	1	11	Corey Heim	Tricon Garage	Toyota	158	66	Running	47
9	25	5	Dean Thompson	Tricon Garage	Toyota	158	0	Running	28
10	24	20	Kaden Honeycutt	Young's Motorsports	Chevrolet	158	0	Running	27
11	3	2	Nick Sanchez (R)	Rev Racing	Chevrolet	158	0	Running	28
12	19	88	Matt Crafton	ThorSport Racing	Ford	158	0	Running	25
13	16	41	Ross Chastain (i)	Niece Motorsports	Chevrolet	158	0	Running	0
14	2	23	Grant Enfinger	GMS Racing	Chevrolet	158	0	Running	32
15	17	16	Tyler Ankrum	Hattori Racing Enterprises	Toyota	158	0	Running	22
16	29	7	Corey LaJoie (i)	Spire Motorsports	Chevrolet	158	0	Running	0
17	36	9	Colby Howard	CR7 Motorsports	Chevrolet	158	0	Running	20
18	14	99	Ben Rhodes	ThorSport Racing	Ford	158	0	Running	19
19	20	43	Daniel Dye (R)	GMS Racing	Chevrolet	158	0	Running	18
20	26	13	Hailie Deegan	ThorSport Racing	Ford	158	2	Running	17
21	12	17	Taylor Gray (R)	Tricon Garage	Toyota	158	1	Running	17
22	22	38	Zane Smith	Front Row Motorsports	Ford	158	0	Running	15
23	34	32	Bret Holmes (R)	Bret Holmes Racing	Chevrolet	158	0	Running	14
24	23	56	Timmy Hill	Hill Motorsports	Toyota	157	0	Running	15
25	7	25	Matt DiBenedetto	Rackley WAR	Chevrolet	157	0	Running	20
26	5	35	Jake Garcia (R)	McAnally-Hilgemann Racing	Chevrolet	157	0	Running	16
27	32	30	Ryan Vargas	On Point Motorsports	Toyota	156	0	Running	10
28	27	04	Johnny Sauter	Roper Racing	Ford	156	0	Running	9
29	35	02	Kris Wright	Young's Motorsports	Chevrolet	155	0	Running	8
30	30	45	Lawless Alan	Niece Motorsports	Chevrolet	126	0	Accident	7
31	9	98	Ty Majeski	ThorSport Racing	Ford	123	0	Running	6
32	10	4	Chase Purdy	Kyle Busch Motorsports	Chevrolet	100	0	Accident	6
33	33	12	Spencer Boyd	Young's Motorsports	Chevrolet	78	0	Fuel Pump	4
34	21	75	Parker Kligerman (i)	Henderson Motorsports	Chevrolet	48	0	Oil Leak	0
35	31	47	Dawson Cram (i)	G2G Racing	Toyota	36	0	Mechanical	0
36	28	46	Brennan Poole (i)	G2G Racing	Toyota	20	0	Engine	0
Official race results

== Standings after the race ==
Drivers' Championship standings

	Pos	Driver	Points
	1	Zane Smith	338
	2	Ty Majeski	329 (-9)
1	3	Corey Heim	323 (-15)
1	4	Ben Rhodes	301 (-37)
1	5	Christian Eckes	299 (-39)
1	6	Grant Enfinger	299 (-39)
	7	Matt Crafton	260 (-78)
	8	Tanner Gray	254 (-84)
	9	Nick Sanchez	233 (-105)
2	10	Stewart Friesen	227 (-111)
Official driver's standings

- Note: Only the first 10 positions are included for the driver standings.

Previous race: 2023 Heart of America 200	NASCAR Craftsman Truck Series; 2023 season	Next race: 2023 Tyson 250
