= 2026 Brickyard 400 =

NASCAR stock car race held in Indianapolis, Indiana, U.S.

2026 Brickyard 400 presented by PPG
Race details
- Race 22 of 36 in the 2026 NASCAR Cup Series
- Date: July 26, 2026
- Location: Indianapolis Motor Speedway in Speedway, Indiana
- Course: Permanent racing facility
- Course length: 2.5 miles (4 km)
- Distance: 160 laps, 400 mi (640 km)
- Average speed: 127.422 miles per hour (205.066 km/h)

Pole position
Driver	Carson Hocevar	Spire Motorsports
- Time: 48.232

Most laps led
Driver	Corey Heim	23XI Racing
- Laps: 58

Fastest lap
Driver	Corey Heim	23XI Racing
- Time: 49.554

Winner
No. 67	Corey Heim	23XI Racing

Television in the United States
- Network: TNT
- Announcers: Adam Alexander, Dale Earnhardt Jr., and Steve Letarte
- Nielsen ratings: 2.384 million

Radio in the United States
- Radio: IMS Radio
- Booth announcers: Brad Gillie and Nick Yeoman
- Turn announcers: Mark Jaynes (Turn 1), Michael Young (Turn 2), Jake Query (Turn 3), and Chris Wilner (Turn 4)

The 2026 Brickyard 400 was a NASCAR Cup Series race held on July 26, 2026, at Indianapolis Motor Speedway in Speedway, Indiana. Contested over 160 laps on the 2.5-mile (4.0 km) oval, it was the 22nd race of the 2026 NASCAR Cup Series season, as well as the fifth and final race of the 2026 NASCAR In-Season Challenge.

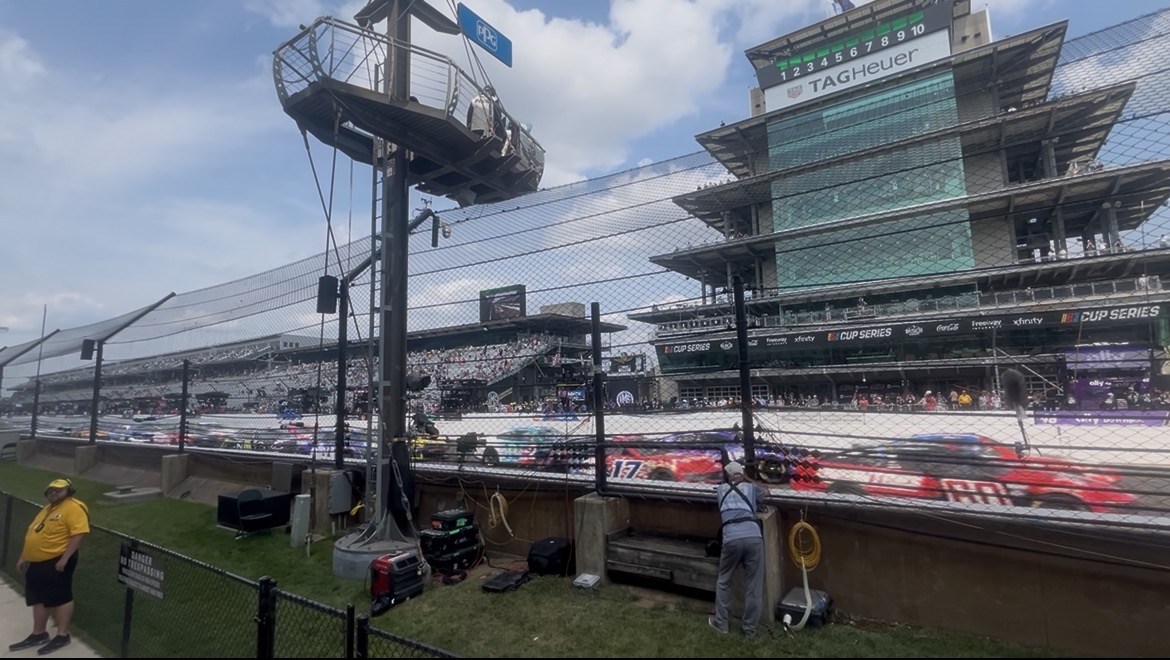
The final restart of the race.

Corey Heim won the race. Christopher Bell finished 2nd, and Joey Logano finished 3rd. Chase Briscoe and Denny Hamlin rounded out the top five, and Brad Keselowski, Josh Berry, Ryan Preece, Carson Hocevar, and Tyler Reddick rounded out the top ten.

Ty Gibbs officially clinched his spot in The Chase.

With a 24th-place finish, Todd Gilliland won the In-Season Challenge along with the US$1 million cash prize. His opponent, Ryan Blaney, ended up in 26th place following a late-race incident with John Hunter Nemechek.

== Report ==
=== Background ===
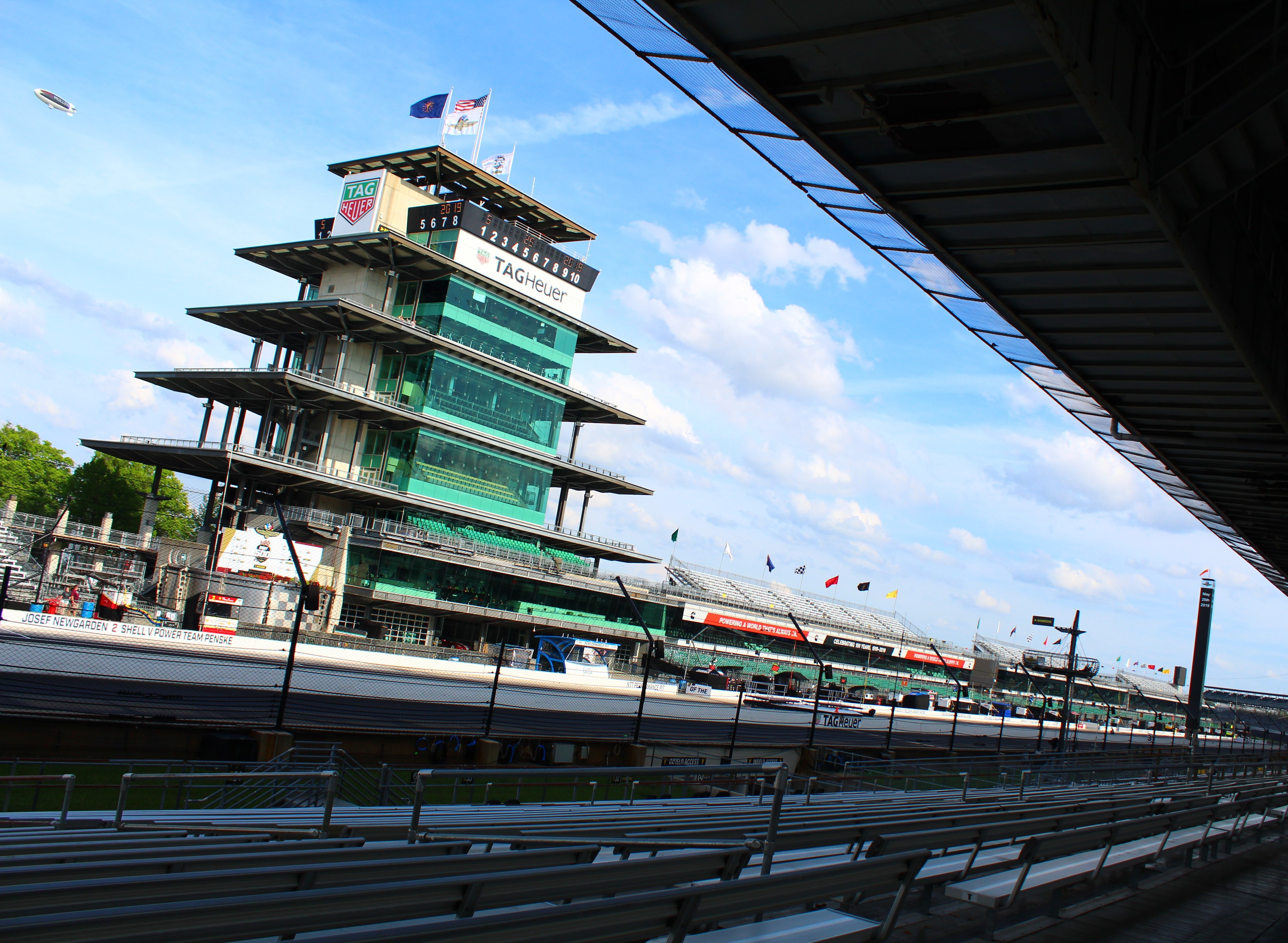
The Pagoda, the control tower, which houses officials, broadcasting, and hospitality suites, is an icon at the Indianapolis Motor Speedway.

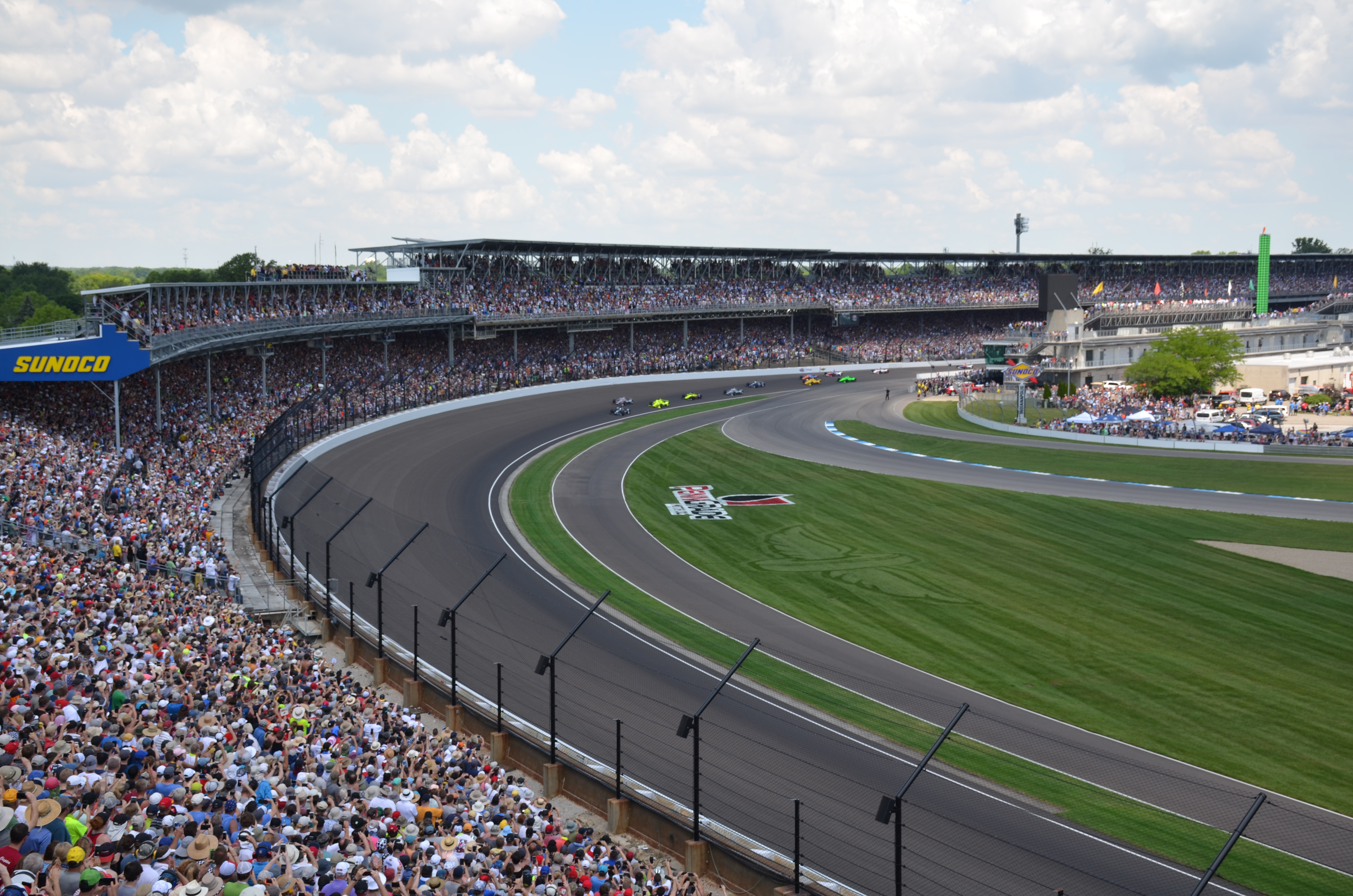
Turn one at the Indianapolis Motor Speedway.

The Indianapolis Motor Speedway, located in Speedway, Indiana, (an enclave suburb of Indianapolis) in the United States, is the home of the Indianapolis 500 of IndyCar Series and the Brickyard 400 of the NASCAR Cup Series. It is located on the corner of 16th Street and Georgetown Road, approximately six miles (10 km) west of Downtown Indianapolis.

Constructed in 1909, it is the original speedway, the first racing facility so named. It has a permanent seating capacity estimated at 235,000 with infield seating raising capacity to an approximate 400,000. It is the highest-capacity sports venue in the world.

Considered relatively flat by American standards, the track is a 2.5-mile (4.0 km), nearly rectangular oval with dimensions that have remained essentially unchanged since its inception: four 0.25-mile (0.40 km) turns, two 0.625-mile-long (1.006 km) straightaways between the fourth and first turns and the second and third turns, and two .125-mile (0.201 km) short straightaways – termed "short chutes" – between the first and second, and third and fourth turns.

The track also held races on its infield road course, formerly the Verizon 200 at the Brickyard, from 2021 to 2023 in the Cup Series, the Pennzoil 150, in the O'Reilly Series, and currently the Sonsio Grand Prix in IndyCar.

==== Entry list ====
- (R) denotes rookie driver.
- (i) denotes driver who is ineligible for series driver points.

No.	Driver	Team	Manufacturer
1	Ross Chastain	Trackhouse Racing	Chevrolet
2	Austin Cindric	Team Penske	Ford
3	Austin Dillon	Richard Childress Racing	Chevrolet
4	Noah Gragson	Front Row Motorsports	Ford
5	Kyle Larson	Hendrick Motorsports	Chevrolet
6	Brad Keselowski	RFK Racing	Ford
7	Daniel Suárez	Spire Motorsports	Chevrolet
9	Chase Elliott	Hendrick Motorsports	Chevrolet
10	Ty Dillon	Kaulig Racing	Chevrolet
11	Denny Hamlin	Joe Gibbs Racing	Toyota
12	Ryan Blaney	Team Penske	Ford
16	A. J. Allmendinger	Kaulig Racing	Chevrolet
17	Chris Buescher	RFK Racing	Ford
19	Chase Briscoe	Joe Gibbs Racing	Toyota
20	Christopher Bell	Joe Gibbs Racing	Toyota
21	Josh Berry	Wood Brothers Racing	Ford
22	Joey Logano	Team Penske	Ford
23	Bubba Wallace	23XI Racing	Toyota
24	William Byron	Hendrick Motorsports	Chevrolet
33	Austin Hill (i)	Richard Childress Racing	Chevrolet
34	Todd Gilliland	Front Row Motorsports	Ford
35	Riley Herbst	23XI Racing	Toyota
38	Zane Smith	Front Row Motorsports	Ford
41	Cole Custer	Haas Factory Team	Ford
42	John Hunter Nemechek	Legacy Motor Club	Toyota
43	Erik Jones	Legacy Motor Club	Toyota
45	Tyler Reddick	23XI Racing	Toyota
47	Ricky Stenhouse Jr.	Hyak Motorsports	Chevrolet
48	Alex Bowman	Hendrick Motorsports	Chevrolet
51	Cody Ware	Rick Ware Racing	Ford
54	Ty Gibbs	Joe Gibbs Racing	Toyota
60	Ryan Preece	RFK Racing	Ford
62	Casey Mears	Beard Motorsports	Chevrolet
67	Corey Heim (i)	23XI Racing	Toyota
71	Michael McDowell	Spire Motorsports	Chevrolet
77	Carson Hocevar	Spire Motorsports	Chevrolet
78	Daniel Dye (i)	Live Fast Motorsports	Chevrolet
88	Connor Zilisch (R)	Trackhouse Racing	Chevrolet
97	Shane van Gisbergen	Trackhouse Racing	Chevrolet
Official entry list

== Practice ==
Christopher Bell was the fastest in the practice session with a time of 49.043 seconds and a speed of 183.512 mph (295.334 km/h).

=== Practice results ===
Pos	No.	Driver	Team	Manufacturer	Time	Speed
1	20	Christopher Bell	Joe Gibbs Racing	Toyota	49.043	183.512
2	42	John Hunter Nemechek	Legacy Motor Club	Toyota	49.132	183.180
3	54	Ty Gibbs	Joe Gibbs Racing	Toyota	49.153	183.102
Official practice results

== Qualifying ==
Carson Hocevar scored the pole for the race with a time of 48.232 and a speed of 186.598 mph (300.300 km/h).

=== Qualifying results ===
Pos	No.	Driver	Team	Manufacturer	Time	Speed
1	77	Carson Hocevar	Spire Motorsports	Chevrolet	48.232	186.598
2	7	Daniel Suárez	Spire Motorsports	Chevrolet	48.288	186.382
3	45	Tyler Reddick	23XI Racing	Toyota	48.367	186.077
4	54	Ty Gibbs	Joe Gibbs Racing	Toyota	48.396	185.966
5	11	Denny Hamlin	Joe Gibbs Racing	Toyota	48.430	185.835
6	71	Michael McDowell	Spire Motorsports	Chevrolet	48.449	185.762
7	67	Corey Heim (i)	23XI Racing	Toyota	48.529	185.456
8	48	Alex Bowman	Hendrick Motorsports	Chevrolet	48.552	185.368
9	16	A. J. Allmendinger	Kaulig Racing	Chevrolet	48.558	185.345
10	5	Kyle Larson	Hendrick Motorsports	Chevrolet	48.566	185.315
11	19	Chase Briscoe	Joe Gibbs Racing	Toyota	48.578	185.269
12	41	Cole Custer	Haas Factory Team	Chevrolet	48.579	185.265
13	12	Ryan Blaney	Team Penske	Ford	48.597	185.197
14	43	Erik Jones	Legacy Motor Club	Toyota	48.633	185.060
15	17	Chris Buescher	RFK Racing	Ford	48.651	184.991
16	6	Brad Keselowski	RFK Racing	Ford	48.676	184.896
17	42	John Hunter Nemechek	Legacy Motor Club	Toyota	48.681	184.877
18	35	Riley Herbst	23XI Racing	Toyota	48.706	184.782
19	22	Joey Logano	Team Penske	Ford	48.728	184.699
20	3	Austin Dillon	Richard Childress Racing	Chevrolet	48.728	184.699
21	24	William Byron	Hendrick Motorsports	Chevrolet	48.761	184.574
22	1	Ross Chastain	Trackhouse Racing	Chevrolet	48.770	184.540
23	20	Christopher Bell	Joe Gibbs Racing	Toyota	48.837	184.287
24	47	Ricky Stenhouse Jr.	Hyak Motorsports	Chevrolet	48.848	184.245
25	97	Shane van Gisbergen	Trackhouse Racing	Chevrolet	48.850	184.237
26	21	Josh Berry	Wood Brothers Racing	Ford	48.879	184.128
27	9	Chase Elliott	Hendrick Motorsports	Chevrolet	48.943	183.887
28	10	Ty Dillon	Kaulig Racing	Chevrolet	48.948	183.869
29	23	Bubba Wallace	23XI Racing	Toyota	48.950	183.861
30	38	Zane Smith	Front Row Motorsports	Ford	49.048	183.494
31	88	Connor Zilisch (R)	Trackhouse Racing	Chevrolet	49.145	183.132
32	33	Austin Hill (i)	Richard Childress Racing	Chevrolet	49.158	183.083
33	4	Noah Gragson	Front Row Motorsports	Ford	49.183	182.990
34	60	Ryan Preece	RFK Racing	Ford	49.238	182.786
35	2	Austin Cindric	Team Penske	Ford	49.254	182.726
36	34	Todd Gilliland	Front Row Motorsports	Ford	49.326	182.460
37	51	Cody Ware	Rick Ware Racing	Chevrolet	49.431	182.072
38	62	Casey Mears	Beard Motorsports	Chevrolet	50.133	179.522
39	78	Daniel Dye (i)	Live Fast Motorsports	Chevrolet	50.290	178.962
Official qualifying results

== Race ==
=== Race results ===
==== Stage Results ====
Stage One Laps: 50

Pos	No	Driver	Team	Manufacturer	Points
1	54	Ty Gibbs	Joe Gibbs Racing	Toyota	10
2	67	Corey Heim (i)	23XI Racing	Toyota	0
3	71	Michael McDowell	Spire Motorsports	Chevrolet	8
4	77	Carson Hocevar	Spire Motorsports	Chevrolet	7
5	24	William Byron	Hendrick Motorsports	Chevrolet	6
6	11	Denny Hamlin	Joe Gibbs Racing	Toyota	5
7	7	Daniel Suárez	Spire Motorsports	Chevrolet	4
8	19	Chase Briscoe	Joe Gibbs Racing	Toyota	3
9	17	Chris Buescher	RFK Racing	Ford	2
10	45	Tyler Reddick	23XI Racing	Toyota	1

Stage Two Laps: 100

Pos	No	Driver	Team	Manufacturer	Points
1	1	Ross Chastain	Trackhouse Racing	Chevrolet	10
2	34	Todd Gilliland	Front Row Motorsports	Ford	9
3	54	Ty Gibbs	Joe Gibbs Racing	Toyota	8
4	11	Denny Hamlin	Joe Gibbs Racing	Toyota	7
5	67	Corey Heim (i)	23XI Racing	Toyota	0
6	77	Carson Hocevar	Spire Motorsports	Chevrolet	5
7	60	Ryan Preece	RFK Racing	Ford	4
8	71	Michael McDowell	Spire Motorsports	Chevrolet	3
9	43	Erik Jones	Legacy Motor Club	Toyota	2
10	7	Daniel Suárez	Spire Motorsports	Chevrolet	1

=== Final Stage Results ===
Stage Three Laps: 160

Pos	Grid	No	Driver	Team	Manufacturer	Laps	Points
1	7	67	Corey Heim (i)	23XI Racing	Toyota	160	0
2	23	20	Christopher Bell	Joe Gibbs Racing	Toyota	160	35
3	19	22	Joey Logano	Team Penske	Ford	160	34
4	11	19	Chase Briscoe	Joe Gibbs Racing	Toyota	160	36
5	5	11	Denny Hamlin	Joe Gibbs Racing	Toyota	160	44
6	16	6	Brad Keselowski	RFK Racing	Ford	160	31
7	26	21	Josh Berry	Wood Brothers Racing	Ford	160	30
8	34	60	Ryan Preece	RFK Racing	Ford	160	33
9	1	77	Carson Hocevar	Spire Motorsports	Chevrolet	160	40
10	3	45	Tyler Reddick	23XI Racing	Toyota	160	28
11	15	17	Chris Buescher	RFK Racing	Ford	160	28
12	4	54	Ty Gibbs	Joe Gibbs Racing	Toyota	160	43
13	12	41	Cole Custer	Haas Factory Team	Chevrolet	160	24
14	35	2	Austin Cindric	Team Penske	Ford	160	23
15	30	38	Zane Smith	Front Row Motorsports	Ford	160	22
16	25	97	Shane van Gisbergen	Trackhouse Racing	Chevrolet	160	21
17	2	7	Daniel Suárez	Spire Motorsports	Chevrolet	160	25
18	6	71	Michael McDowell	Spire Motorsports	Chevrolet	160	30
19	8	48	Alex Bowman	Hendrick Motorsports	Chevrolet	160	18
20	24	47	Ricky Stenhouse Jr.	Hyak Motorsports	Chevrolet	160	17
21	21	24	William Byron	Hendrick Motorsports	Chevrolet	160	22
22	33	4	Noah Gragson	Front Row Motorsports	Ford	160	15
23	22	1	Ross Chastain	Trackhouse Racing	Chevrolet	160	24
24	36	34	Todd Gilliland	Front Row Motorsports	Ford	160	22
25	9	16	A. J. Allmendinger	Kaulig Racing	Chevrolet	160	12
26	13	12	Ryan Blaney	Team Penske	Ford	160	11
27	14	43	Erik Jones	Legacy Motor Club	Toyota	160	12
28	29	23	Bubba Wallace	23XI Racing	Toyota	160	9
29	20	3	Austin Dillon	Richard Childress Racing	Chevrolet	160	8
30	28	10	Ty Dillon	Kaulig Racing	Chevrolet	160	7
31	37	51	Cody Ware	Rick Ware Racing	Chevrolet	160	6
32	17	42	John Hunter Nemechek	Legacy Motor Club	Toyota	158	5
33	32	33	Austin Hill (i)	Richard Childress Racing	Chevrolet	125	0
34	31	88	Connor Zilisch (R)	Trackhouse Racing	Chevrolet	122	3
35	38	62	Casey Mears	Beard Motorsports	Chevrolet	121	2
36	18	35	Riley Herbst	23XI Racing	Toyota	120	1
37	27	9	Chase Elliott	Hendrick Motorsports	Chevrolet	119	1
38	39	78	Daniel Dye (i)	Live Fast Motorsports	Chevrolet	93	0
39	10	5	Kyle Larson	Hendrick Motorsports	Chevrolet	43	1
Official race results

=== Race statistics ===
- Lead changes: 15 among 11 different drivers
- Cautions/Laps: 5 for 27
- Red flags: 0
- Time of race: 3 hours, 8 minutes and 21 seconds
- Average speed: 127.422 miles per hour (205.066 km/h)

== Media ==
=== Television ===
TNT covered the race on the television side. Adam Alexander, Dale Earnhardt Jr. and Steve Letarte called the race from the broadcast booth. Marty Snider, Shannon Spake, Danielle Trotta and Mamba Smith handled pit road for the television side.

TNT
Booth announcers	Pit reporters
Lap-by-lap: Adam Alexander; Color-commentator: Dale Earnhardt Jr. Color-commentator: Steve Letarte	Marty Snider; Shannon Spake; Danielle Trotta; Mamba Smith

=== Radio ===
Indianapolis Motor Speedway Radio Network had the radio call for the race, which was also simulcast on Sirius XM NASCAR Radio. For the first time, members of the Motor Racing Network were part of the network crew, along with IMS Radio and Performance Racing Network personnel.

IMS Radio
Booth announcers	Turn announcers	Pit reporters
Lead announcer: Brad Gillie; Announcer: Nick Yeoman	Turn 1: Mark Jaynes; Turn 2: Michael Young; Turn 3: Jake Query; Turn 4: Chris Wilner	Brett McMillan; Rich Nye; Jason Toy; Jonathan Grace

== Standings after the race ==
Drivers' Championship standings

	Pos	Driver	Points
	1	Denny Hamlin	886
	2	Tyler Reddick	802 (–84)
	3	Ryan Blaney	766 (–120)
	4	Ty Gibbs	751 (–135)
2	5	Carson Hocevar	638 (–248)
1	6	Chase Elliott	635 (–251)
1	7	Chase Briscoe	623 (–263)
2	8	Kyle Larson	617 (–269)
	9	Chris Buescher	613 (–273)
	10	Christopher Bell	609 (–277)
	11	Daniel Suárez	583 (–303)
	12	William Byron	568 (–318)
2	13	Joey Logano	545 (–341)
1	14	Bubba Wallace	540 (–346)
1	15	Shane van Gisbergen	537 (–349)
	16	Austin Cindric	518 (–368)
Official driver's standings

Manufacturers' Championship standings

Pos	Manufacturer	Points
1	Toyota	1,017
2	Chevrolet	866 (–151)
3	Ford	766 (–251)

- Note: Only the first 16 positions are included for the driver standings.

=== NASCAR In-Season Challenge bracket ===
Sonoma
1	#45 Tyler Reddick	36th
32	#48 Alex Bowman	10th
16	#2 Austin Cindric	13th
17	#6 Brad Keselowski	15th
8	#7 Daniel Suárez	31st
25	#34 Todd Gilliland	29th
9	#77 Carson Hocevar	11th
24	#38 Zane Smith	18th
12	#19 Chase Briscoe	2nd
21	#16 A. J. Allmendinger	16th
5	#54 Ty Gibbs	3rd
28	#3 Austin Dillon	27th
13	#23 Bubba Wallace	22nd
20	#71 Michael McDowell	9th
4	#9 Chase Elliott	17th
29	#4 Noah Gragson	32nd
2	#11 Denny Hamlin	26th
31	#10 Ty Dillon	35th
15	#43 Erik Jones	23rd
18	#22 Joey Logano	24th
7	#17 Chris Buescher	19th
26	#42 John Hunter Nemechek	25th
10	#20 Christopher Bell	5th
23	#1 Ross Chastain	14th
11	#24 William Byron	12th
22	#47 Ricky Stenhouse Jr.	21st
6	#5 Kyle Larson	4th
27	#35 Riley Herbst	30th
14	#97 Shane van Gisbergen	1st
19	#60 Ryan Preece	8th
3	#12 Ryan Blaney	6th
30	#21 Josh Berry	28th

Chicagoland
32	#48 Bowman	5th
16	#2 Cindric	13th
25	#34 Gilliland	16th
9	#77 Hocevar	22nd
12	#19 Briscoe	1st
5	#54 Ty Gibbs	8th
20	#71 McDowell	29th
4	#9 Elliott	11th
2	#11 Hamlin	3rd
15	#43 Jones	15th
7	#17 Buescher	19th
10	#20 Bell	2nd
11	#24 Byron	4th
6	#5 Larson	34th
14	#97 van Gisbergen	25th
3	#12 Blaney	7th

Atlanta
32	#48 Bowman	22nd
25	#34 Gilliland	19th
12	#19 Briscoe	36th
4	#9 Elliott	13th
2	#11 Hamlin	12th
10	#20 Bell	2nd
11	#24 Byron	16th
3	#12 Blaney	1st

North Wilkesboro
25	#34 Gilliland	8th
4	#9 Elliott	17th
10	#20 Bell	19th
3	#12 Blaney	11th

Indianapolis
25	#34 Gilliland	24th
3	#12 Blaney	26th

Previous race: 2026 Window World 450	NASCAR Cup Series; 2026 season	Next race: 2026 Iowa Corn 350
