= 2024 GEICO 500 =

NASCAR Cup Series race

Race details
- Race 10 of 36 in the 2024 NASCAR Cup Series
- Date: April 21, 2024
- Location: Talladega Superspeedway in Lincoln, Alabama
- Course: Permanent racing facility
- Course length: 2.66 miles (4.28 km)
- Distance: 188 laps, 500.08 mi (804.64 km)
- Average speed: 155.977 miles per hour (251.021 km/h)

Pole position
| Driver | Michael McDowell | Front Row Motorsports |
- Time: 52.609

Most laps led
| Driver | Michael McDowell | Front Row Motorsports |
- Laps: 36

Winner
| No. 45 | Tyler Reddick | 23XI Racing |

Television in the United States
- Network: Fox
- Announcers: Mike Joy, Clint Bowyer, and Kevin Harvick

Radio in the United States
- Radio: MRN
- Booth announcers: Alex Hayden, Jeff Striegle, and Todd Gordon
- Turn announcers: Dave Moody (1 & 2), Mike Bagley (Backstretch), and Jason Toy (3 & 4)

The 2024 GEICO 500 was a NASCAR Cup Series race held on April 21, 2024, at Talladega Superspeedway in Lincoln, Alabama. Contested over 188 laps on the 2.66 mile (4.28 km) superspeedway, it was the 10th race of the 2024 NASCAR Cup Series season. Tyler Reddick won the race. Brad Keselowski finished 2nd, and Noah Gragson finished 3rd. Ricky Stenhouse Jr. and Alex Bowman rounded out the top five, and Anthony Alfredo, William Byron, Todd Gilliland, Daniel Hemric, and Harrison Burton rounded out the top ten.

== Report ==
=== Background ===
Talladega Superspeedway, the track where the race was held.

Talladega Superspeedway, formerly known as Alabama International Motor Speedway, is a motorsports complex located north of Talladega, Alabama. It is located on the former Anniston Air Force Base in the small city of Lincoln. A tri-oval, the track was constructed in 1969 by the International Speedway Corporation, a business controlled by the France family. Talladega is most known for its steep banking. The track currently hosts NASCAR's Cup Series, Xfinity Series and Craftsman Truck Series. Talladega is the longest NASCAR oval with a length of 2.66-mile-long (4.28 km) tri-oval like the Daytona International Speedway, which is 2.5-mile-long (4.0 km).

==== Entry list ====
- (R) denotes rookie driver.
- (i) denotes driver who is ineligible for series driver points.

| No. | Driver | Team | Manufacturer |
|---|---|---|---|
| 1 | Ross Chastain | Trackhouse Racing | Chevrolet |
| 2 | Austin Cindric | Team Penske | Ford |
| 3 | Austin Dillon | Richard Childress Racing | Chevrolet |
| 4 | Josh Berry (R) | Stewart–Haas Racing | Ford |
| 5 | Kyle Larson | Hendrick Motorsports | Chevrolet |
| 6 | Brad Keselowski | RFK Racing | Ford |
| 7 | Corey LaJoie | Spire Motorsports | Chevrolet |
| 8 | Kyle Busch | Richard Childress Racing | Chevrolet |
| 9 | Chase Elliott | Hendrick Motorsports | Chevrolet |
| 10 | Noah Gragson | Stewart–Haas Racing | Ford |
| 11 | Denny Hamlin | Joe Gibbs Racing | Toyota |
| 12 | Ryan Blaney | Team Penske | Ford |
| 14 | Chase Briscoe | Stewart–Haas Racing | Ford |
| 15 | Cody Ware | Rick Ware Racing | Ford |
| 16 | Shane van Gisbergen (i) | Kaulig Racing | Chevrolet |
| 17 | Chris Buescher | RFK Racing | Ford |
| 19 | Martin Truex Jr. | Joe Gibbs Racing | Toyota |
| 20 | Christopher Bell | Joe Gibbs Racing | Toyota |
| 21 | Harrison Burton | Wood Brothers Racing | Ford |
| 22 | Joey Logano | Team Penske | Ford |
| 23 | Bubba Wallace | 23XI Racing | Toyota |
| 24 | William Byron | Hendrick Motorsports | Chevrolet |
| 31 | Daniel Hemric | Kaulig Racing | Chevrolet |
| 34 | Michael McDowell | Front Row Motorsports | Ford |
| 38 | Todd Gilliland | Front Row Motorsports | Ford |
| 41 | Ryan Preece | Stewart–Haas Racing | Ford |
| 42 | John Hunter Nemechek | Legacy Motor Club | Toyota |
| 43 | Erik Jones | Legacy Motor Club | Toyota |
| 45 | Tyler Reddick | 23XI Racing | Toyota |
| 47 | Ricky Stenhouse Jr. | JTG Daugherty Racing | Chevrolet |
| 48 | Alex Bowman | Hendrick Motorsports | Chevrolet |
| 51 | Justin Haley | Rick Ware Racing | Ford |
| 54 | Ty Gibbs | Joe Gibbs Racing | Toyota |
| 62 | Anthony Alfredo (i) | Beard Motorsports | Chevrolet |
| 71 | Zane Smith (R) | Spire Motorsports | Chevrolet |
| 77 | Carson Hocevar (R) | Spire Motorsports | Chevrolet |
| 78 | B. J. McLeod (i) | Live Fast Motorsports | Chevrolet |
| 99 | Daniel Suárez | Trackhouse Racing | Chevrolet |
Official entry list

== Qualifying ==
Michael McDowell scored the pole for the race with a time of 52.609 and a speed of 182.022 mph (292.936 km/h).

Kyle Larson was on the pit-road to put down a qualifying lap but Nascar officials saw something with his car and pulled him to the garage. He was not allowed to qualify as the team made an unapproved adjustment to the roof rails as they pushed the car to the grid.

=== Qualifying results ===
| Pos | No. | Driver | Team | Manufacturer | R1 | R2 |
|---|---|---|---|---|---|---|
| 1 | 34 | Michael McDowell | Front Row Motorsports | Ford | 52.741 | 52.609 |
| 2 | 2 | Austin Cindric | Team Penske | Ford | 53.020 | 52.691 |
| 3 | 38 | Todd Gilliland | Front Row Motorsports | Ford | 53.000 | 52.789 |
| 4 | 8 | Kyle Busch | Richard Childress Racing | Chevrolet | 52.970 | 52.863 |
| 5 | 3 | Austin Dillon | Richard Childress Racing | Chevrolet | 53.086 | 52.969 |
| 6 | 19 | Martin Truex Jr. | Joe Gibbs Racing | Toyota | 53.048 | 52.992 |
| 7 | 22 | Joey Logano | Team Penske | Ford | 53.027 | 53.044 |
| 8 | 17 | Chris Buescher | RFK Racing | Ford | 53.122 | 53.119 |
| 9 | 9 | Chase Elliott | Hendrick Motorsports | Chevrolet | 53.168 | 53.122 |
| 10 | 20 | Christopher Bell | Joe Gibbs Racing | Toyota | 53.120 | 53.198 |
| 11 | 41 | Ryan Preece | Stewart-Haas Racing | Ford | 53.175 | — |
| 12 | 48 | Alex Bowman | Hendrick Motorsports | Chevrolet | 53.183 | — |
| 13 | 24 | William Byron | Hendrick Motorsports | Chevrolet | 53.185 | — |
| 14 | 23 | Bubba Wallace | 23XI Racing | Toyota | 53.186 | — |
| 15 | 54 | Ty Gibbs | Joe Gibbs Racing | Toyota | 53.208 | — |
| 16 | 21 | Harrison Burton | Wood Brothers Racing | Ford | 53.211 | — |
| 17 | 16 | Shane van Gisbergen (i) | Kaulig Racing | Chevrolet | 53.226 | — |
| 18 | 45 | Tyler Reddick | 23XI Racing | Toyota | 53.262 | — |
| 19 | 31 | Daniel Hemric | Kaulig Racing | Chevrolet | 53.298 | — |
| 20 | 42 | John Hunter Nemechek | Legacy Motor Club | Toyota | 53.306 | — |
| 21 | 12 | Ryan Blaney | Team Penske | Ford | 53.320 | — |
| 22 | 6 | Brad Keselowski | RFK Racing | Ford | 53.322 | — |
| 23 | 11 | Denny Hamlin | Joe Gibbs Racing | Toyota | 53.407 | — |
| 24 | 62 | Anthony Alfredo (i) | Beard Motorsports | Chevrolet | 53.411 | — |
| 25 | 99 | Daniel Suárez | Trackhouse Racing | Chevrolet | 53.414 | — |
| 26 | 14 | Chase Briscoe | Stewart-Haas Racing | Ford | 53.455 | — |
| 27 | 51 | Justin Haley | Rick Ware Racing | Ford | 53.478 | — |
| 28 | 43 | Erik Jones | Legacy Motor Club | Toyota | 53.480 | — |
| 29 | 4 | Josh Berry (R) | Stewart-Haas Racing | Ford | 53.487 | — |
| 30 | 71 | Zane Smith (R) | Spire Motorsports | Chevrolet | 53.532 | — |
| 31 | 7 | Corey LaJoie | Spire Motorsports | Chevrolet | 53.543 | — |
| 32 | 1 | Ross Chastain | Trackhouse Racing | Chevrolet | 53.590 | — |
| 33 | 47 | Ricky Stenhouse Jr. | JTG Daugherty Racing | Chevrolet | 53.686 | — |
| 34 | 15 | Cody Ware | Rick Ware Racing | Ford | 53.720 | — |
| 35 | 77 | Carson Hocevar (R) | Spire Motorsports | Chevrolet | 53.767 | — |
| 36 | 10 | Noah Gragson | Stewart-Haas Racing | Ford | 53.811 | — |
| 37 | 78 | B. J. McLeod (i) | Live Fast Motorsports | Chevrolet | 54.290 | — |
| 38 | 5 | Kyle Larson | Hendrick Motorsports | Chevrolet | 0.000 | — |
Official qualifying results

== Race ==
=== Race results ===
Coming to the checkers, Michael McDowell put a bad block on Brad Keselowski in the tri-oval, triggering a massive wreck behind the leaders, with one car flipping and finishing the race on its side. Tyler Reddick would steal the win from Keselowski and take 23XI Racing to victory lane for the first time in 2024, and the 2nd time at Talladega.

==== Stage Results ====
Stage One Laps: 60

| Pos | No | Driver | Team | Manufacturer | Points |
|---|---|---|---|---|---|
| 1 | 2 | Austin Cindric | Team Penske | Ford | 10 |
| 2 | 9 | Chase Elliott | Hendrick Motorsports | Chevrolet | 9 |
| 3 | 24 | William Byron | Hendrick Motorsports | Chevrolet | 8 |
| 4 | 12 | Ryan Blaney | Team Penske | Ford | 7 |
| 5 | 8 | Kyle Busch | Richard Childress Racing | Chevrolet | 6 |
| 6 | 21 | Harrison Burton | Wood Brothers Racing | Ford | 5 |
| 7 | 20 | Christopher Bell | Joe Gibbs Racing | Toyota | 4 |
| 8 | 6 | Brad Keselowski | RFK Racing | Ford | 3 |
| 9 | 45 | Tyler Reddick | 23XI Racing | Toyota | 2 |
| 10 | 48 | Alex Bowman | Hendrick Motorsports | Chevrolet | 1 |
Official stage one results

Stage Two Laps: 60

| Pos | No | Driver | Team | Manufacturer | Points |
|---|---|---|---|---|---|
| 1 | 22 | Joey Logano | Team Penske | Ford | 10 |
| 2 | 2 | Austin Cindric | Team Penske | Ford | 9 |
| 3 | 5 | Kyle Larson | Hendrick Motorsports | Chevrolet | 8 |
| 4 | 3 | Austin Dillon | Richard Childress Racing | Chevrolet | 7 |
| 5 | 1 | Ross Chastain | Trackhouse Racing | Chevrolet | 6 |
| 6 | 45 | Tyler Reddick | 23XI Racing | Toyota | 5 |
| 7 | 17 | Chris Buescher | RFK Racing | Ford | 4 |
| 8 | 9 | Chase Elliott | Hendrick Motorsports | Chevrolet | 3 |
| 9 | 41 | Ryan Preece | Stewart-Haas Racing | Ford | 2 |
| 10 | 54 | Ty Gibbs | Joe Gibbs Racing | Toyota | 1 |
Official stage two results

=== Final Stage Results ===
Stage Three Laps: 68

| Pos | Grid | No | Driver | Team | Manufacturer | Laps | Points |
|---|---|---|---|---|---|---|---|
| 1 | 18 | 45 | Tyler Reddick | 23XI Racing | Toyota | 188 | 47 |
| 2 | 22 | 6 | Brad Keselowski | RFK Racing | Ford | 188 | 38 |
| 3 | 36 | 10 | Noah Gragson | Stewart-Haas Racing | Ford | 188 | 34 |
| 4 | 33 | 47 | Ricky Stenhouse Jr. | JTG Daugherty Racing | Chevrolet | 188 | 33 |
| 5 | 12 | 48 | Alex Bowman | Hendrick Motorsports | Chevrolet | 188 | 33 |
| 6 | 24 | 62 | Anthony Alfredo (i) | Beard Motorsports | Chevrolet | 188 | 0 |
| 7 | 13 | 24 | William Byron | Hendrick Motorsports | Chevrolet | 188 | 38 |
| 8 | 3 | 38 | Todd Gilliland | Front Row Motorsports | Ford | 188 | 29 |
| 9 | 19 | 31 | Daniel Hemric | Kaulig Racing | Chevrolet | 188 | 28 |
| 10 | 16 | 21 | Harrison Burton | Wood Brothers Racing | Ford | 188 | 32 |
| 11 | 6 | 19 | Martin Truex Jr. | Joe Gibbs Racing | Toyota | 188 | 26 |
| 12 | 26 | 14 | Chase Briscoe | Stewart-Haas Racing | Ford | 188 | 25 |
| 13 | 32 | 1 | Ross Chastain | Trackhouse Racing | Chevrolet | 188 | 30 |
| 14 | 11 | 41 | Ryan Preece | Stewart-Haas Racing | Ford | 188 | 25 |
| 15 | 9 | 9 | Chase Elliott | Hendrick Motorsports | Chevrolet | 188 | 34 |
| 16 | 29 | 4 | Josh Berry (R) | Stewart-Haas Racing | Ford | 188 | 21 |
| 17 | 35 | 77 | Carson Hocevar (R) | Spire Motorsports | Chevrolet | 188 | 20 |
| 18 | 31 | 7 | Corey LaJoie | Spire Motorsports | Chevrolet | 188 | 19 |
| 19 | 7 | 22 | Joey Logano | Team Penske | Ford | 188 | 28 |
| 20 | 21 | 12 | Ryan Blaney | Team Penske | Ford | 188 | 24 |
| 21 | 38 | 5 | Kyle Larson | Hendrick Motorsports | Chevrolet | 188 | 24 |
| 22 | 15 | 54 | Ty Gibbs | Joe Gibbs Racing | Toyota | 188 | 16 |
| 23 | 2 | 2 | Austin Cindric | Team Penske | Ford | 188 | 33 |
| 24 | 34 | 15 | Cody Ware | Rick Ware Racing | Ford | 188 | 13 |
| 25 | 8 | 17 | Chris Buescher | RFK Racing | Ford | 188 | 16 |
| 26 | 25 | 99 | Daniel Suárez | Trackhouse Racing | Chevrolet | 188 | 11 |
| 27 | 4 | 8 | Kyle Busch | Richard Childress Racing | Chevrolet | 188 | 16 |
| 28 | 17 | 16 | Shane van Gisbergen (i) | Kaulig Racing | Chevrolet | 188 | 0 |
| 29 | 30 | 71 | Zane Smith (R) | Spire Motorsports | Chevrolet | 188 | 8 |
| 30 | 5 | 3 | Austin Dillon | Richard Childress Racing | Chevrolet | 188 | 14 |
| 31 | 1 | 34 | Michael McDowell | Front Row Motorsports | Ford | 187 | 6 |
| 32 | 37 | 78 | B. J. McLeod (i) | Live Fast Motorsports | Chevrolet | 187 | 0 |
| 33 | 20 | 42 | John Hunter Nemechek | Legacy Motor Club | Toyota | 184 | 4 |
| 34 | 27 | 51 | Justin Haley | Rick Ware Racing | Ford | 184 | 3 |
| 35 | 28 | 43 | Erik Jones | Legacy Motor Club | Toyota | 154 | 2 |
| 36 | 14 | 23 | Bubba Wallace | 23XI Racing | Toyota | 154 | 1 |
| 37 | 23 | 11 | Denny Hamlin | Joe Gibbs Racing | Toyota | 154 | 1 |
| 38 | 10 | 20 | Christopher Bell | Joe Gibbs Racing | Toyota | 132 | 5 |
Official race results

=== Race statistics ===
- Lead changes: 73 among 23 different drivers
- Cautions/Laps: 4 for 21 laps
- Red flags: 0
- Time of race: 3 hours, 13 minutes and 29 seconds
- Average speed: 155.977 miles per hour (251.021 km/h)

== Media ==
=== Television ===
Fox Sports covered their 24th race at the Talladega Superspeedway. Mike Joy, Clint Bowyer and 2010 spring Talladega winner Kevin Harvick called the race from the broadcast booth. Jamie Little, Regan Smith and Josh Sims handled pit road for the television side, and Larry McReynolds provided insight from the Fox Sports studio in Charlotte.

Fox
| Booth announcers | Pit reporters | In-race analyst |
|---|---|---|
| Lap-by-lap: Mike Joy; Color-commentator: Clint Bowyer; Color-commentator: Kevin Harvick | Jamie Little; Regan Smith; Josh Sims | Larry McReynolds |

=== Radio ===
MRN had the radio call for the race which was also simulcasted on Sirius XM NASCAR Radio. Alex Hayden, Jeff Striegle, & former championship winning crew chief Todd Gordon called the race in the booth when the field raced through the tri-oval. Dave Moody called the race from the Sunoco spotters stand outside turn 2 when the field raced through turns 1 and 2. Mike Bagley called the race from a platform inside the backstretch when the field raced down the backstretch and Jason Toy called the race from the Sunoco spotters stand outside turn 4 when the field raced through turns 3 and 4. Steve Post, Kim Coon, Paul Small and Chris Wilner worked pit road for the radio side for MRN.

MRN Radio
| Booth announcers | Turn announcers | Pit reporters |
|---|---|---|
| Lead announcer: Alex Hayden; Announcer: Jeff Striegle; Announcer: Todd Gordon | Turns 1 & 2: Dave Moody; Backstretch: Mike Bagley; Turns 3 & 4: Jason Toy | Steve Post; Kim Coon; Paul Small; Chris Wilner |

== Standings after the race ==
Drivers' Championship standings

| | Pos | Driver | Points |
|---|---|---|---|
| | 1 | Kyle Larson | 359 |
| | 2 | Martin Truex Jr. | 344 (–15) |
| 1 | 3 | Chase Elliott | 337 (–22) |
| 1 | 4 | William Byron | 335 (–24) |
| 3 | 5 | Tyler Reddick | 316 (–43) |
| 3 | 6 | Denny Hamlin | 308 (–51) |
| | 7 | Ryan Blaney | 302 (–57) |
| 2 | 8 | Ty Gibbs | 296 (–63) |
| 2 | 9 | Ross Chastain | 277 (–82) |
| 4 | 10 | Alex Bowman | 261 (–98) |
| 2 | 11 | Bubba Wallace | 257 (–102) |
| | 12 | Chase Briscoe | 256 (–103) |
| 3 | 13 | Christopher Bell | 255 (–104) |
| 3 | 14 | Brad Keselowski | 254 (–105) |
| | 15 | Joey Logano | 245 (–114) |
| 3 | 16 | Chris Buescher | 245 (–114) |
Official driver's standings

Manufacturers' Championship standings

| Pos | Manufacturer | Points |
|---|---|---|
| 1 | Chevrolet | 371 |
| 2 | Toyota | 362 (–9) |
| 3 | Ford | 332 (–39) |

- Note: Only the first 16 positions are included for the driver standings.
- . – Driver has clinched a position in the NASCAR Cup Series playoffs.

| Previous race: 2024 Autotrader EchoPark Automotive 400 | NASCAR Cup Series; 2024 season | Next race: 2024 Würth 400 |
