= Bubba Pollard =

American racing driver (born 1987)

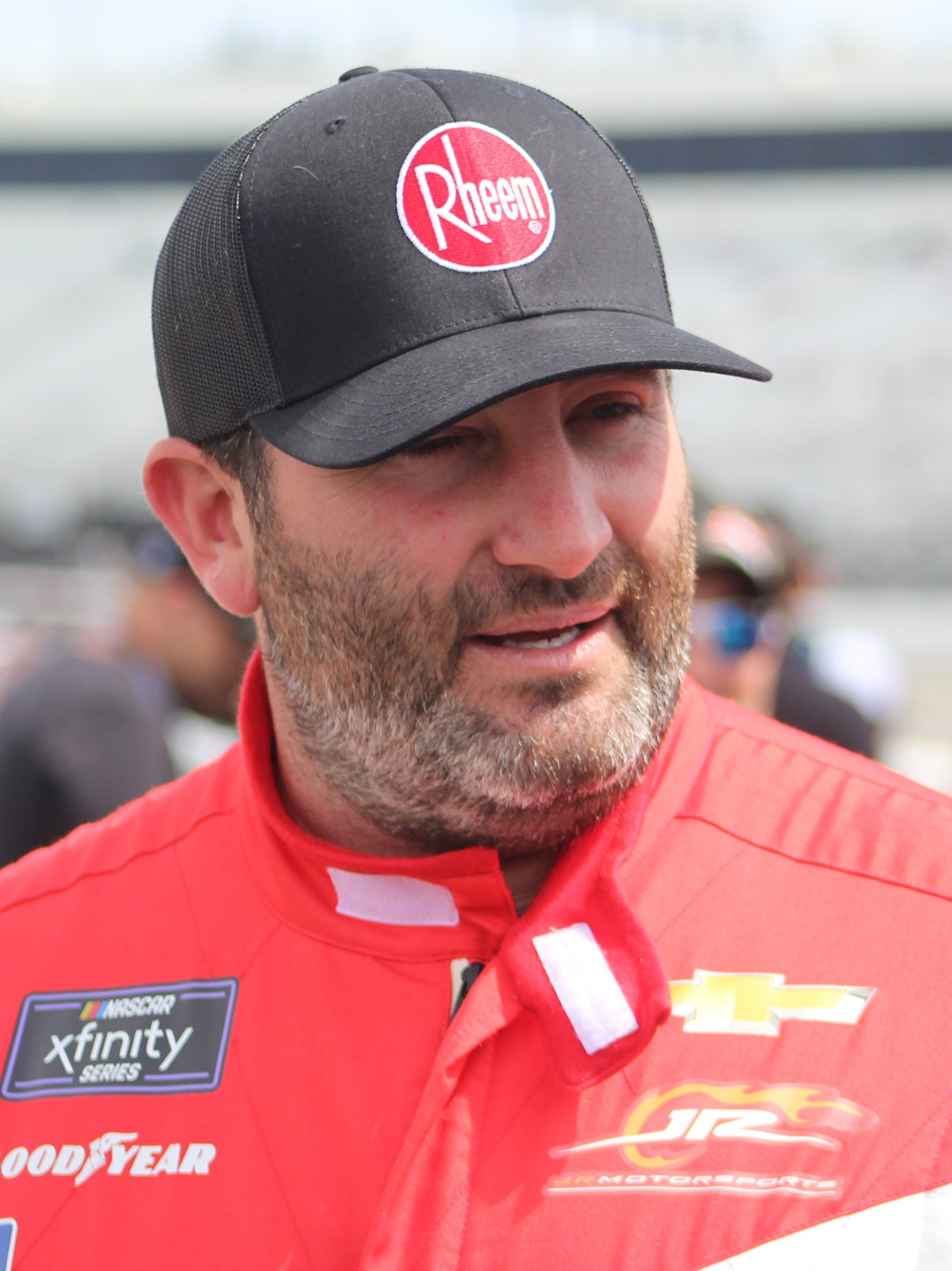
- Pollard at Richmond Raceway in 2024
- Born: Andrew Williams Pollard; March 16, 1987 (age 39); Senoia, Georgia, U.S.
- Achievements: 2016 All American 400 Winner; 2017 Slinger Nationals Winner; 2012, 2023, 2024 Rattler 250 Winner; 2018, 2019 Canadian Short Track Nationals Winner; 2020 Florida Governor's Cup Winner; 2015, 2017, 2022 Red Eye 100 Winner; 2018 Oxford 250 Winner; 2017, 2024 Money in the Bank 150 Winner; 2019 World Series of Asphalt Super Late Model Champion; 2014 Southern Super Series Champion; 2012 CRA South Series Champion; 2011, 2012, 2014 Sunoco Gulf Coast Championship Series Champion; 2014, 2017 Snowflake 100 Winner; 2009, 2011 Viper Pro Late Model Series Champion

NASCAR O'Reilly Auto Parts Series career
- 2 races run over 1 year
- 2024 position: 53rd
- Best finish: 53rd (2024)
- First race: 2024 ToyotaCare 250 (Richmond)
- Last race: 2024 National Debt Relief 250 (Martinsville)
Wins	Top tens	Poles
0	1	0

ARCA Menards Series career
- 5 races run over 3 years
- Best finish: 75th (2005)
- First race: 2005 Harley-Davidson of Cincinnati 150 (Kentucky)
- Last race: 2015 Menards 200 Presented by Federated Car Care (Toledo)
Wins	Top tens	Poles
0	0	0

ARCA Menards Series East career
- 1 race run over 1 year
- Best finish: 39th (2024)
- First race: 2024 Pensacola 150 (Pensacola)
Wins	Top tens	Poles
0	1	0
- Statistics up to date as of September 19, 2024.

Andrew Williams "Bubba" Pollard (born March 16, 1987) is an American professional stock car racing driver. He competes in super late model racing, driving the No. 26 Ford for his own team. He has previously competed in the NASCAR Xfinity Series, the ARCA Racing Series, and the ARCA Menards Series East. He is noted as one of the most successful active super late model drivers, winning the All-American 400, Rattler 250, World Crown 300, and the 2014 Southern Super Series championship.

== Racing career ==
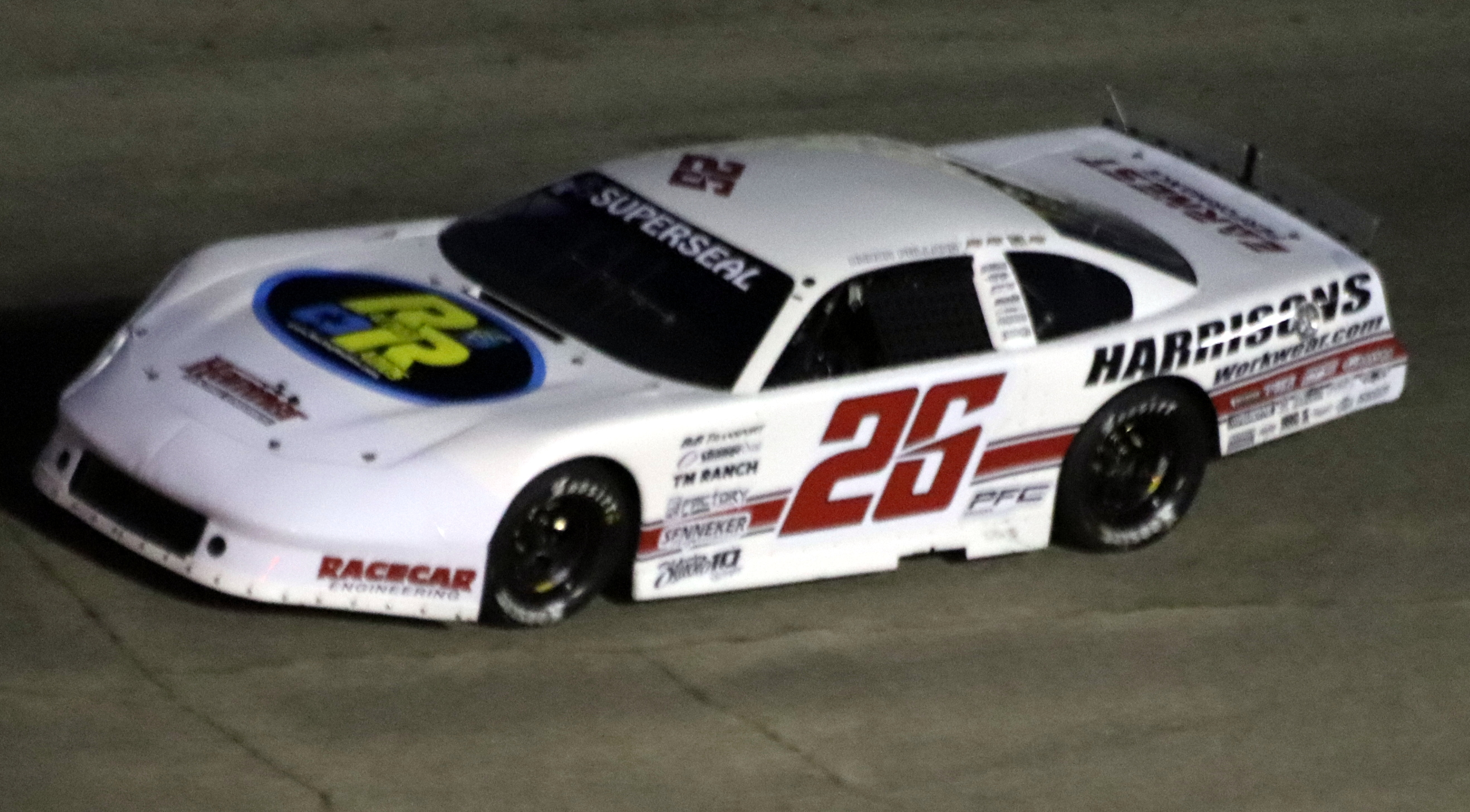
Pollard's No. 26 late model in 2019

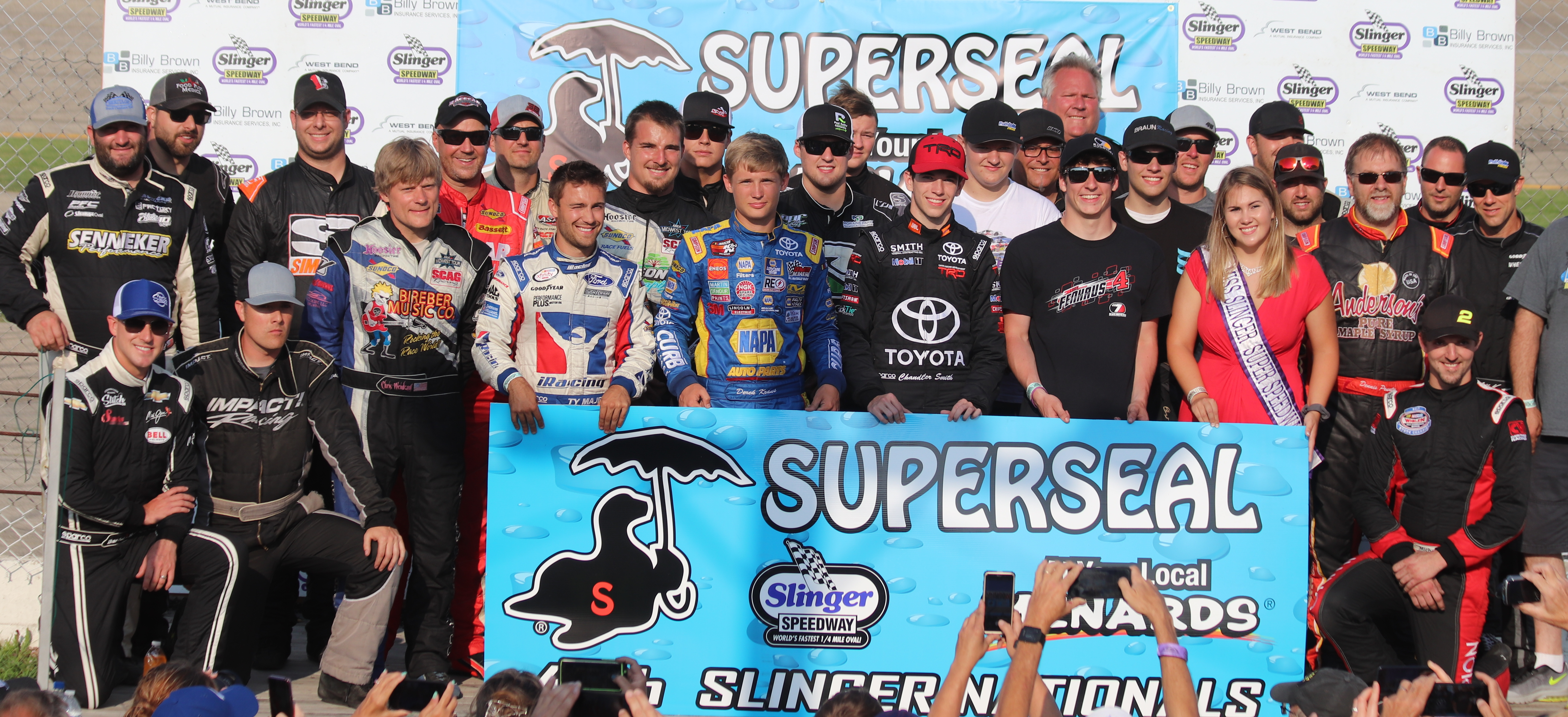
Pollard (first on the left in the back row) and the other drivers who competed in the 2019 Slinger Nationals.

Growing up, Pollard raced at Senoia Speedway in Senoia, Georgia, a track that his grandfather owned. He was invited on Roush Racing: Driver X in 2005 but did not win the contest, and besides for sporadic ARCA Re/Max Series starts, did not have the funding to compete on a national level.

During the 2010s, Pollard won the 2014 Southern Super Series championship, and also ran several premier late model events, winning the Kern County Raceway Park Winter Showdown in 2015 and 2016.

During the 2017 Snowball Derby, Noah Gragson nicknamed Pollard "Redneck Jesus" for his popularity in the short-track racing community and his success. Pollard later said that he does not aspire to move up to NASCAR but rather stay in the grassroots feel of the short track community.

On August 3, 2019, Pollard and Matt Craig battled for the win in a CARS Tour race at Hickory Speedway. Craig won the race, and upon parking his car on pit road after the race, Pollard was offered a hand gesture by Craig's father. Pollard got out of his car and fought Craig's father before local law enforcement separated the two; Pollard was later fined his $1,500 race winnings and was suspended for the next five CARS Tour events. In September 2019, Pollard won his second consecutive Canadian Short Track Nationals at Jukasa Motor Speedway, winning $75,000 CAD ($56,000 USD). In October 2019, Pollard ran for JR Motorsports in the ValleyStar Credit Union 300. The partnership bloomed from Pollard developing a friendship with JRM late model driver Josh Berry during the 2019 CARS Tour season.

To start off 2020, Pollard ran a tour-type Modified for NASCAR Cup Series driver Ryan Preece at the World Series of Asphalt at New Smyrna Speedway.

It was announced on March 9, 2020, that Pollard would make his debut in the ARCA Menards Series East, driving DGR-Crosley's No. 17 Ford in the race at Five Flags. The race was postponed due to the COVID-19 pandemic, but Pollard continued racing his super late model through the summer, scoring a Southern Super Series win at Five Flags. Pollard ventured to Jennerstown Speedway in Pennsylvania, winning a CARS/CRA co-sanctioned race. He also traveled to Wisconsin International Raceway for the ARCA Midwest Tour's Dixieland 250 and won his debut race at Citrus County Speedway.

== Personal life ==
Outside of his racing career, Pollard is a construction worker. Pollard also has a wife, Erin Pollard, and three daughters.

== Motorsports career results ==
=== Stock car career summary ===
Season	Series	Team	Races	Wins	Top 5	Top 10	Points	Position
2005	ARCA Re/Max Series	K Automotive Racing	1	0	0	0	395	75th
2005	ARCA Re/Max Series	Bob Schacht Motorsports	1	0	0	0	395	75th
2005	ARCA Re/Max Series	James Hylton Motorsports	1	0	0	0	395	75th
2012	ARCA Racing Series	Pollard Motorsports	1	0	0	0	175	100th
2015	CARS Super Late Model Tour	Bubba Pollard	2	0	2	2	60	30th
2015	ARCA Racing Series	Goodson Racing	1	0	0	0	140	108th
2017	CARS Super Late Model Tour	N/A	3	1	3	3	58	24th
2018	CARS Super Late Model Tour	Vickie Pollard	4	2	2	2	87	12th
2019	CARS Super Late Model Tour	Bubba Pollard	4	3	4	4	135	9th
2020	CARS Super Late Model Tour	Bubba Pollard	4	2	2	2	132	9th
2020	CARS Late Model Stock Car Tour	Bubba Pollard	1	0	0	0	10	52nd
2021	CARS Super Late Model Tour	Bubba Pollard	2	0	1	1	47	16th
2021	CARS Late Model Stock Car Tour	R&S Race Cars	1	0	0	1	34	32nd
2021	CARS Late Model Stock Car Tour	Justin Johnson	1	0	0	0	34	32nd
2022	SRX Series	N/A	1	0	1	1	0	21st
2023	ASA STARS National Tour	Bubba Pollard Racing	9	1	3	5	495	4th
2024	ASA STARS National Tour	Bubba Pollard Racing	4	1	1	2	217	16th
2024	ARCA Menards Series East	Phoenix Racing	1	0	1	1	41	39th
2024	NASCAR Xfinity Series	JR Motorsports	1	0	0	1	37	53rd
2024	NASCAR Xfinity Series	Sam Hunt Racing	1	0	0	0	37	53rd
2025	ASA STARS National Tour	Bubba Pollard Racing	7	1	2	5	380	13th
2026	ASA STARS National Tour	Bubba Pollard Racing	4	0	0	0		

=== NASCAR ===
(key) (Bold – Pole position awarded by qualifying time. Italics – Pole position earned by points standings or practice time. * – Most laps led.)

==== Xfinity Series ====
NASCAR Xfinity Series results
Year	Team	No.	Make	1	2	3	4	5	6	7	8	9	10	11	12	13	14	15	16	17	18	19	20	21	22	23	24	25	26	27	28	29	30	31	32	33	NXSC	Pts	Ref
2024	JR Motorsports	88	Chevy	DAY	ATL	LVS	PHO	COA	RCH; 6	MAR	TEX	TAL	DOV	DAR	CLT	PIR	SON	IOW	NHA	NSH	CSC	POC	IND	MCH	DAY	DAR	ATL	GLN	BRI	KAN	TAL	ROV	LVS	HOM			53rd	37	
2024	Sam Hunt Racing	26	Toyota																																MAR; 31	PHO	53rd	37	

^{*} Season still in progress
^{1} Ineligible for series points

=== ARCA Racing Series ===
(key) (Bold – Pole position awarded by qualifying time. Italics – Pole position earned by points standings or practice time. * – Most laps led.)

ARCA Racing Series results
Year	Team	No.	Make	1	2	3	4	5	6	7	8	9	10	11	12	13	14	15	16	17	18	19	20	21	22	23	ARSC	Pts	Ref
2005	K Automotive Racing	29	Ford	DAY	NSH	SLM	KEN; 20	TOL	LAN	MIL	POC																75th	395	
2005	Bob Schacht Motorsports	75	Ford									MCH; 11	KAN	KEN	BLN	POC	GTW	LER	NSH								75th	395	
2005	James Hylton Motorsports	48	Ford																	MCH; 28	ISF	TOL	DSF	CHI	SLM	TAL	75th	395	
2012	Pollard Motorsports	29	Chevy	DAY	MOB; 11	SLM	TAL	TOL	ELK	POC	MCH	WIN	NJE	IOW	CHI	IRP	POC	BLN	ISF	MAD	SLM	DSF	KAN				100th	175	
2015	Goodson Racing	1	Ford	DAY	MOB	NSH; DNS	SLM	TAL	TOL; 18	NJE	POC	MCH	CHI	WIN	IOW	IRP	POC	BLN	ISF	DSF	SLM	KEN	KAN				108th	140	

==== ARCA Menards Series East ====
ARCA Menards Series East results
Year	Team	No.	Make	1	2	3	4	5	6	7	8	AMSEC	Pts	Ref
2024	Phoenix Racing	1	Chevy	FIF; 3	DOV	NSV	FRS	IOW	IRP	MLW	BRI	39th	41	

=== Superstar Racing Experience ===
(key) * – Most laps led. ^{1} – Heat 1 winner. ^{2} – Heat 2 winner.

Superstar Racing Experience results
Year	No.	1	2	3	4	5	6	SRXC	Pts
2022	26	FIF; 2^{1}	SBO	STA	NSV	I55	SHA	21st	0^{1}

=== CARS Late Model Stock Car Tour ===
(key) (Bold – Pole position awarded by qualifying time. Italics – Pole position earned by points standings or practice time. * – Most laps led. ** – All laps led.)

CARS Late Model Stock Car Tour results
Year	Team	No.	Make	1	2	3	4	5	6	7	8	9	10	11	12	13	CLMSCTC	Pts	Ref
2020	Bubba Pollard	26	Ford	SNM	ACE; 23	HCY	HCY	DOM	FCS	LGY	CCS	FLO	GRE				52nd	10	
2021	R&S Race Cars	26	Ford	DIL	HCY	OCS; 7	ACE	CRW	LGY	DOM							32nd	34	
2021	Justin Johnson	44	Ford								HCY; 25	MMS	TCM	FLC	WKS	SBO	32nd	34	

=== CARS Super Late Model Tour ===
(key)

CARS Super Late Model Tour results
Year	Team	No.	Make	1	2	3	4	5	6	7	8	9	10	11	12	13	CSLMTC	Pts	Ref
2015	Bubba Pollard	26	Ford	SNM; 4													30th	60	
2015	Bubba Pollard	83	Ford		ROU; 2	HCY	SNM	TCM	MMS	ROU	CON	MYB	HCY				30th	60	
2017	N/A	26P	Ford	CON	DOM	DOM	HCY	HCY	BRI	AND; 1	ROU	TCM					24th	58	
2017	N/A	26	Ford										ROU; 5	HCY; 4	CON	SBO	24th	58	
2018	Vickie Pollard	26P	Ford	MYB	NSH; 33												12th	87	
2018	Vickie Pollard	26	Ford			ROU; 1	HCY	BRI									12th	87	
2018	Vickie Pollard	26P	Chevy						**AND**; 1*								12th	87	
2018	Vickie Pollard	26	Chevy							HCY; 19*	ROU	SBO					12th	87	
2019	Bubba Pollard	26P	Ford	**SNM**; 1*	HCY; 1	NSH											9th	135	
2019	Bubba Pollard	26	Ford				MMS; 1	BRI	HCY; 3	ROU	SBO						9th	135	
2020	Bubba Pollard	26	Ford	SNM; 14	HCY; 1	JEN; 1*	HCY	FCS	BRI	FLC							9th	132	
2020	Bubba Pollard	26P	Ford								NSH; 24						9th	132	
2021	Bubba Pollard	26	Ford	HCY	GPS	NSH	JEN; 16	HCY; 3	MMS	TCM	SBO						16th	47	

=== ASA STARS National Tour ===
(key) (Bold – Pole position awarded by qualifying time. Italics – Pole position earned by points standings or practice time. * – Most laps led. ** – All laps led.)

ASA STARS National Tour results
Year	Team	No.	Make	1	2	3	4	5	6	7	8	9	10	11	12	ASNTC	Pts	Ref
2023	Bubba Pollard Racing	26	Chevy	FIF; 19												4th	495	
2023	Bubba Pollard Racing	26P	Ford		MAD; 2					WIR; 7			NSV; 23			4th	495	
2023	Bubba Pollard Racing	26	Ford			NWS; 1*	HCY; 23	MLW; 8	**AND**; 14		TOL; 4	WIN				4th	495	
2024	Bubba Pollard Racing	26P	Ford	NSM; 1	FIF; 17	HCY; 6	MAD; 19	MLW	AND	OWO	TOL	WIN	NSV			16th	217	
2025	Bubba Pollard Racing	26P	Ford	NSM; 9	FIF; 9	DOM; 14	HCY; 5					OWO; 1	TOL; 17	WIN	NSV	13th	380	
2025	Bubba Pollard Racing	26	Ford					NPS; 9	MAD	SLG	AND					13th	380	
2026	Bubba Pollard Racing	26	Ford	NSM; 31	FIF; 22	HCY; 25	SLG	MAD	NPS	OWO; 15	TRI; Wth	WIN	NSV	NSM		-*	-*	
