= Trey Crews =

American racing driver

- Born: Halifax, Virginia, U.S.

CARS Late Model Stock Tour career
- Debut season: 2020
- Years active: 2020, 2022, 2026–present
- Starts: 3
- Championships: 0
- Wins: 0
- Poles: 0
- Best finish: 41st in 2020
- Statistics up to date as of September 5, 2026.

Trey Crews III (birth date unknown) is an American professional stock car racing driver. He currently competes in the zMAX CARS Tour, driving the No. 16 Dodge for R&S Race Cars.

Crews has also competed in the IHRA Stock Car Series, the Virginia Late Model Triple Crown Series, and the NASCAR Local Racing Series, and is a regular competitor at South Boston Speedway, where he has won multiple Limited Sportsman champion.

== Motorsports results ==
=== CARS Late Model Stock Car Tour ===
(key) (Bold – Pole position awarded by qualifying time. Italics – Pole position earned by points standings or practice time. * – Most laps led. ** – All laps led.)

CARS Late Model Stock Car Tour results
Year	Team	No.	Make	1	2	3	4	5	6	7	8	9	10	11	12	13	14	15	CLMSCTC	Pts	Ref
2020	Trey Crews	9	Toyota	SNM	ACE	HCY	HCY	DOM	FCS	LGY; 12	CCS	FLO	GRE						41st	21	
2022	N/A	44	Ford	CRW	HCY	GRE	AAS	FCS	LGY	DOM	HCY	ACE	MMS	NWS	TCM	ACE	SBO	CRW; 11	52nd	22	
2026	R&S Race Cars	16	Dodge	SNM	WCS	NSV	CRW	ACE	LGY; 25	DOM	NWS	HCY	AND	FLC	TCM	NPS	SBO		88th	17	

=== IHRA Late Model Sportsman Series ===
(key) (Bold – Pole position awarded by qualifying time. Italics – Pole position earned by points standings or practice time. * – Most laps led. ** – All laps led.)

IHRA Late Model Sportsman Series
Year	Team	No.	Make	1	2	3	ISCSS	Pts	Ref
2026	N/A	38	N/A	DUB; 14	CDL	AND	N/A	0	
