= Blake Stallings =

American racing driver (born 1995)

- Born: June 1, 1995 (age 31) Danville, Virginia, U.S.

CARS Late Model Stock Tour career
- Debut season: 2015
- Years active: 2015, 2017–2018, 2020, 2022–2024, 2026–present
- Starts: 22
- Championships: 0
- Wins: 0
- Poles: 0
- Best finish: 9th in 2015
- Statistics up to date as of May 10, 2026.

Blake Stallings (born June 1, 1995) is an American professional stock car racing driver. He currently competes in the zMAX CARS Tour, driving the No. 10 Dodge for R&S Race Cars.

Stallings' father, Steve, is the co-owner of R&S Race Cars, which competes in late model competition. The younger Stallings also works for the team as a fabricator and welder.

Stallings has also competed in the Virginia Late Model Triple Crown Series, the PASS South Super Late Model Series, and the NASCAR Weekly Series, and is a regular competitor at South Boston Speedway. He is also a former winner of the Rodney Cook Classic at Ace Speedway, and a former winner of the Dual Track Showdown hosted by Ace and Tri-County Speedway in 2021.

== Motorsports results ==
=== CARS Late Model Stock Car Tour ===
(key) (Bold – Pole position awarded by qualifying time. Italics – Pole position earned by points standings or practice time. * – Most laps led. ** – All laps led.)

CARS Late Model Stock Car Tour results
Year	Team	No.	Make	1	2	3	4	5	6	7	8	9	10	11	12	13	14	15	16	17	CLMSCTC	Pts	Ref
2015	TORP Chassis	77	Chevy	SNM; 9	ROU; 12	HCY; 9	SNM; 14	TCM; 26	MMS; 6	ROU; 14	CON; 8	MYB; 15	HCY								9th	193	
2017	Steve Stallings	77	Toyota	CON	DOM	DOM	HCY	HCY	BRI	AND	ROU	TCM	ROU	HCY	CON	SBO; 7					43rd	26	
2018	Steve Stallings	77S	Toyota	TCM; 7	MYB	ROU	HCY	BRI	ACE; 6	CCS	KPT	HCY	WKS	OCS	SBO						24th	53	
2020	R&S Race Cars	19	Toyota	SNM	ACE; 7	HCY	HCY; 13	DOM	FCS	LGY; 5	CCS	FLO	GRE								20th	74	
2022	R&S Race Cars	77S	Ford	CRW	HCY	GRE	AAS	FCS	LGY	DOM	HCY	ACE; 11	MMS	NWS	TCM	ACE; 25	SBO; 20	CRW			38th	43	
2023	R&S Race Cars	77S	Ford	SNM	FLC	HCY	ACE	NWS	LGY	DOM	CRW	HCY	ACE; 14	TCM	WKS	AAS	SBO; 25	TCM	CRW		39th	27	
2024	N/A	15C	N/A	SNM	HCY	AAS	OCS	ACE	TCM	LGY	DOM	CRW	HCY	NWS	ACE; 17	WCS	FLC	SBO	TCM	NWS	N/A	0	
2026	R&S Race Cars	10	Dodge	SNM	WCS	NSV	CRW	ACE; 19	LGY	DOM	NWS	HCY	AND	FLC	TCM	NPS	SBO				73rd	23	
