= Willie Allen (racing driver) =

American racing driver & team owner (born 1980)

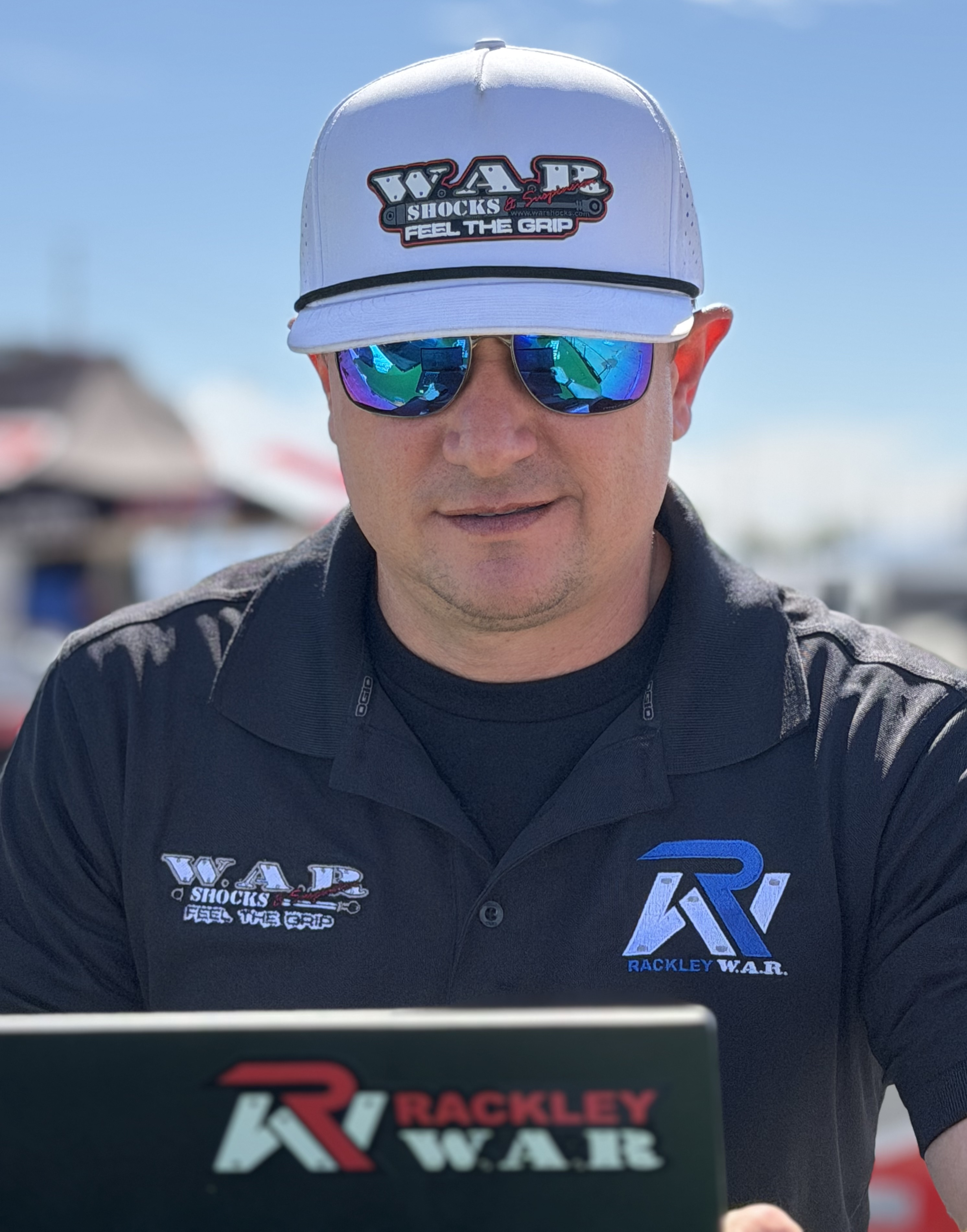
- Allen in 2026
- Born: William A. Allen; June 15, 1980 (age 46); Bon Aqua, Tennessee, U.S.
- Awards: 2007 NASCAR Craftsman Truck Series Rookie of the Year

NASCAR O'Reilly Auto Parts Series career
- 29 races run over 5 years
- 2014 position: 119th
- Best finish: 30th (2010)
- First race: 2006 Sam's Town 250 (Memphis)
- Last race: 2011 Nashville 300 (Nashville)
Wins	Top tens	Poles
0	0	0

NASCAR FedEx Freight Truck Series career
- 35 races run over 7 years
- 2021 position: 58th
- Best finish: 15th (2007)
- First race: 2005 Kroger 200 (Martinsville)
- Last race: 2021 Lucas Oil 150 (Phoenix)
Wins	Top tens	Poles
0	2	0

ARCA Menards Series career
- 2 races run over 1 year
- Best finish: 95th (2006)
- First race: 2006 Daytona ARCA 200 (Daytona)
- Last race: 2006 PFG Lester 150 (Nashville)
Wins	Top tens	Poles
0	0	0
- Statistics up to date as of December 30, 2021.

William A. Allen (born June 15, 1980) is an American professional stock car racing driver and team owner. He is the co-owner of Rackley W.A.R., a team that competes full-time in the NASCAR Craftsman Truck Series and in late model racing. Allen previously competed as a driver in the NASCAR Xfinity Series, Truck Series (including a full season in 2007 where he won the Rookie of the Year award), and the ARCA Menards Series.

== Racing career ==
=== Driving career ===
Allen made his NASCAR debut in the Craftsman Truck Series in 2005, driving the No. 47 Chevrolet Silverado for Morgan-Dollar Motorsports in the Kroger 200 at Martinsville Speedway, starting 21st and finishing sixth. He made one more start in 2005 for SS-Green Light Racing.

Allen ran the first two races of the 2006 ARCA Racing Series season in the No. 75 for Bob Schacht Motorsports, finishing 38th at Daytona and finishing fifth at Nashville. Towards the end of the year, he made his Busch Series debut, driving the No. 14 Dodge for FitzBradshaw Racing at Memphis, where he finished 28th, and Phoenix, where he finished 35th. He also ran the final race of the 2006 Truck Series season for ThorSport Racing in a part-time third truck for the team, the No. 87. This led to his running full-time with the team in 2007, where he replaced Kerry Earnhardt in the team's No. 13 truck. It was his first full season in NASCAR. After finishing the season 15th in the standings, with his only top ten of the season being a sixth-place finish at Talladega, Allen was replaced by Shelby Howard for the 2008 season.

In 2008, Allen started the season in the renamed Nationwide Series, running two races (Daytona and Nashville) in the Sadler Brothers Racing No. 95, with a best finish of 29th at Daytona. Later in the year, returned to Morgan-Dollar Motorsports in the Truck Series to drive three races in the No. 46 at Memphis, Kentucky and Nashville. In those three races, Allen was sponsored by the band Rascal Flatts, who were promoting their new album Still Feels Good on the truck. Shortly after rejoining the team, Morgan-Dollar was bought by New England Patriots player Randy Moss, who renumbered the truck to the No. 81 to match his jersey number in the NFL. However, Allen's plans were not affected by the change in ownership.

Allen attempted six Nationwide races in 2009 in the Nos. 92 and 96 for Whitney Motorsports, but failed to qualify for one race and started and parked in the other five races that he did qualify for. He returned to the Truck Series in 2010 for Team Gill Racing to drive their No. 46 in the race at Nashville, starting 36th and finishing 29th.

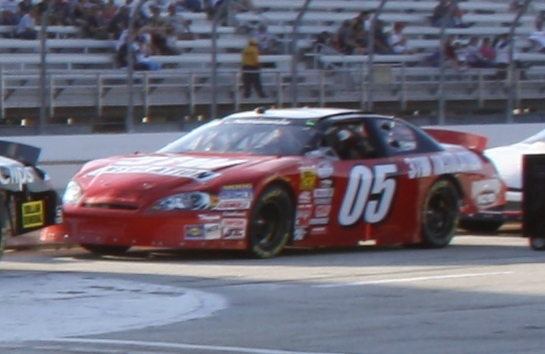
The No. 05 car for Day Enterprise Racing, which Allen would drive part-time in 2010 and 2011

In the Nationwide Series, Allen drove the No. 05 31-W Insulation/CertainTeed/Cash America car for Day Enterprise Racing in 2010. In the 24th race at Bristol that same year, Allen qualified the car in 7th place, his best career start in front of Cup Series regulars Clint Bowyer, Ryan Newman, and Carl Edwards. Allen would finish 11th in that race. Allen ran 18 races in 2010 with a best finish of 11th. Allen also failed to qualify for four additional races. He returned to the team for two more races in 2011 before he was without a ride in any NASCAR series in 2012 and 2013.

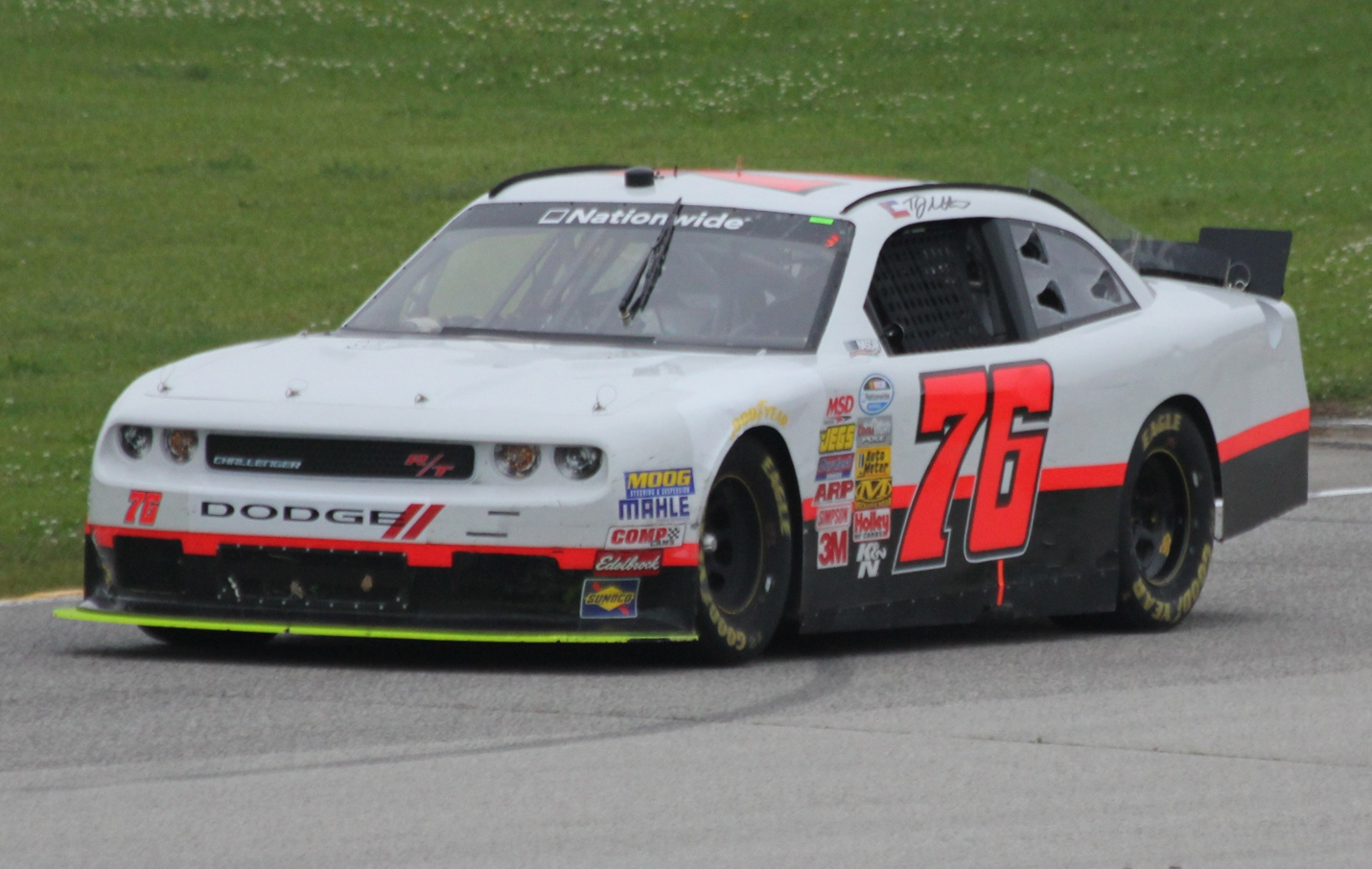
The No. 76 car for Martins Motorsports, which Allen would drive in two races in 2014

Allen found a ride for 2014 in the Nationwide Series, driving multiple races with hopes of a full season in the No. 76 for the upstart Martins Motorsports team. Team owner/driver Tommy Joe Martins (who drove the team's other car, the No. 67) stated that the plan at the start of the season was for Allen to run full races in the No. 76, while Martins would start and park the No. 67. These plans fell apart after both Martins Motorsports cars failed to qualify for the spring race at Bristol, For the remainder of the season, the No. 67 would no longer be fielded (except for at Michigan) and Martins would drive the No. 76 himself instead of Allen. After not racing in the Truck Series for the previous three years, Allen drove Jennifer Jo Cobb's No. 0 start and park truck at Charlotte.

In 2021, Allen returned for the 2021 Chevrolet Silverado 250 at Talladega, his first NASCAR sanctioned race since 2014. He drove the No. 25 for Rackley W.A.R.

=== Team owner ===
After several years out of NASCAR, it was announced that Allen would return to the sport as an owner and would start a full-time team in the Truck Series in 2021 with Curtis Sutton, the owner of Rackley Roofing, which was the primary sponsor of the No. 68 Clay Greenfield Motorsports truck in 2020. With their co-ownership, they named the team Rackley W.A.R. (Rackley for Sutton's company and W.A.R. standing for "Willie Allen Racing"). The team fields the No. 25 Chevrolet Silverado for Dawson Sutton with sponsorship from Rackley Roofing and Chad Kendrick as crew chief.

== Motorsports career results ==
=== NASCAR ===
(key) (Bold – Pole position awarded by qualifying time. Italics – Pole position earned by points standings or practice time. * – Most laps led.)

==== Nationwide Series ====
NASCAR Nationwide Series results
Year	Team	No.	Make	1	2	3	4	5	6	7	8	9	10	11	12	13	14	15	16	17	18	19	20	21	22	23	24	25	26	27	28	29	30	31	32	33	34	35	NNSC	Pts	Ref
2006	FitzBradshaw Racing	14	Dodge	DAY	CAL	MXC	LVS	ATL	BRI	TEX	NSH	PHO	TAL	RCH	DAR	CLT	DOV	NSH	KEN	MLW	DAY	CHI	NHA	MAR	GTW	IRP	GLN	MCH	BRI	CAL	RCH	DOV	KAN	CLT	MEM; 28	TEX	PHO; 35	HOM	103rd	137	
2008	Sadler Brothers Racing	95	Dodge	DAY; 29	CAL	LVS	ATL	BRI	NSH; 33	TEX	PHO	MXC	TAL	RCH	DAR	CLT	DOV	NSH	KEN	MLW	NHA	DAY	CHI	GTW	IRP	CGV	GLN	MCH	BRI	CAL	RCH	DOV	KAN	CLT	MEM	TEX	PHO	HOM	107th	140	
2009	Whitney Motorsports	96	Dodge	DAY	CAL	LVS	BRI	TEX	NSH	PHO	TAL	RCH	DAR	CLT	DOV	NSH; 36	KEN	MLW	NHA; 42	DAY	CHI	GTW; 41	IRP	IOW	GLN														96th	200	
2009	Whitney Motorsports	92	Dodge																							MCH; 42	BRI	CGV	ATL	RCH	DOV	KAN; DNQ	CAL	CLT	MEM; 43	TEX	PHO	HOM	96th	200	
2010	Day Enterprises Racing	05	Chevy	DAY	CAL; 28	LVS; 25	BRI; 15	NSH; 35	PHO	TEX	TAL; DNQ	RCH; 27	DAR; DNQ	DOV; 23	CLT; 22	NSH; 15	KEN; 36	ROA	NHA; 24	DAY	CHI; 27	GTW; 15	IRP	IOW	GLN	MCH; 43	BRI; 11	CGV	ATL; 23	RCH; 32	DOV; 20	KAN; DNQ	CAL; 22	CLT	GTW; DNQ	TEX	PHO	HOM	30th	1605	
2011	Day Enterprises Racing	05	Chevy	DAY	PHO	LVS	BRI; 35	CAL	TEX	TAL	NSH; 41	RCH	DAR	DOV	IOW	CLT	CHI	MCH	ROA	DAY	KEN	NHA	NSH	IRP	IOW	GLN	CGV	BRI	ATL	RCH	CHI	DOV	KAN	CLT	TEX	PHO	HOM		83rd	12	
2014	Martins Motorsports	76	Dodge	DAY; DNQ	PHO	LVS	BRI; DNQ	CAL	TEX	DAR	RCH	TAL	IOW	CLT	DOV	MCH	ROA	KEN	DAY	NHA	CHI	IND	IOW	GLN	MOH	BRI	ATL	RCH	CHI	KEN	DOV	KAN	CLT	TEX	PHO	HOM			119th	0^{1}	

==== Camping World Truck Series ====
NASCAR Camping World Truck Series results
Year	Team	No.	Make	1	2	3	4	5	6	7	8	9	10	11	12	13	14	15	16	17	18	19	20	21	22	23	24	25	NCWTC	Pts	Ref
2005	Morgan-Dollar Motorsports	47	Chevy	DAY	CAL	ATL	MAR	GTW	MFD	CLT	DOV	TEX	MCH	MLW	KAN	KEN	MEM	IRP	NSH	BRI	RCH	NHA	LVS	MAR; 6	ATL	TEX			63rd	211	
2005	Green Light Racing	08	Chevy																								PHO; 34	HOM	63rd	211	
2006	ThorSport Racing	87	Chevy	DAY	CAL	ATL	MAR	GTW	CLT	MFD	DOV	TEX	MCH	MLW	KAN	KEN	MEM	IRP	NSH	BRI	NHA	LVS	TAL	MAR	ATL	TEX	PHO	HOM; 25	89th	0	
2007	ThorSport Racing	13	Chevy	DAY; 29	CAL; 22	ATL; 13	MAR; 22	KAN; 18	CLT; 21	MFD; 28	DOV; 14	TEX; 28	MCH; 22	MLW; 31	MEM; 23	KEN; 15	IRP; 29	NSH; 29	BRI; 19	GTW; 12	NHA; 28	LVS; 23	TAL; 6	MAR; 14	ATL; 20	TEX; 11	PHO; 17	HOM; 28	15th	2524	
2008	Morgan-Dollar Motorsports	46	Chevy	DAY	CAL	ATL	MAR	KAN	CLT	MFD	DOV	TEX	MCH	MLW	MEM; 19														52nd	306	
2008	Randy Moss Motorsports	81	Chevy													KEN; 15	IRP	NSH; 27	BRI	GTW	NHA	LVS	TAL	MAR	ATL	TEX	PHO	HOM	52nd	306	
2010	Team Gill Racing	46	Dodge	DAY	ATL	MAR	NSH; 29	KAN	DOV	CLT	TEX	MCH	IOW	GTW	IRP	POC	NSH	DAR	BRI	CHI	KEN	NHA	LVS	MAR	TAL	TEX	PHO	HOM	108th	76	
2014	Jennifer Jo Cobb Racing	0	Chevy	DAY	MAR	KAN	CLT; 32	DOV	TEX	GTW	KEN	IOW	ELD	POC	MCH	BRI	MSP	CHI	NHA	LVS	TAL	MAR	TEX	PHO	HOM				110th	0^{1}	
2021	Rackley W.A.R.	25	Chevy	DAY	DRC	LVS	ATL	BRD	RCH	KAN	DAR	COA	CLT	TEX	NSH	POC	KNX	GLN	GTW	DAR	BRI	LVS	TAL; 18	MAR	PHO; 24				58th	32	

^{*} Season still in progress
^{1} Ineligible for series points

=== ARCA Re/Max Series ===
(key) (Bold – Pole position awarded by qualifying time. Italics – Pole position earned by points standings or practice time. * – Most laps led.)

ARCA Re/Max Series results
Year	Team	No.	Make	1	2	3	4	5	6	7	8	9	10	11	12	13	14	15	16	17	18	19	20	21	22	23	ARMSC	Pts	Ref
2006	Bob Schacht Motorsports	75	Ford	DAY; 38	NSH; 5	SLM	WIN	KEN	TOL	POC	MCH	KAN	KEN	BLN	POC	GTW	NSH	MCH	ISF	MIL	TOL	DSF	CHI	SLM	TAL	IOW	95th	245	

=== CARS Super Late Model Tour ===
(key)

CARS Super Late Model Tour results
Year	Team	No.	Make	1	2	3	4	5	6	7	8	9	CSLMTC	Pts	Ref
2018	N/A	26A	Toyota	MYB	NSH; 24	ROU	HCY	BRI	AND	HCY	ROU	SBO	N/A	0	
2020	N/A	26A	Toyota	SNM	HCY	JEN	HCY	FCS	BRI	FLC	NSH; 7		N/A	0	

=== ASA STARS National Tour ===
(key) (Bold – Pole position awarded by qualifying time. Italics – Pole position earned by points standings or practice time. * – Most laps led. ** – All laps led.)

ASA STARS National Tour results
Year	Team	No.	Make	1	2	3	4	5	6	7	8	9	10	ASNTC	Pts	Ref
2023	Rackley W.A.R.	26A	Chevy	FIF	MAD	NWS	HCY	MLW	AND	WIR	TOL	WIN	**NSV**; 5	58th	63	

Achievements
Preceded by Erik Darnell	NASCAR Craftsman Truck Series Rookie of the Year; 2007	Succeeded by Colin Braun
