= 2019 CARS Tour =

23rd season of the CARS Tour

The 2019 CARS Tour was the 23rd season of the CARS Tour, a stock car racing series. It began at Southern National Motorsports Park on March 9 and ended at South Boston Speedway on November 2. Bobby McCarty won the Late Model Stock Tour championship, while Matt Craig won the Super Late Model Tour championship.

Bobby McCarty entered the season as the defending Late Model Stock Tour champion, while Jared Fryar entered as the defending Super Late Model Tour champion.

== Schedule & results ==
| Date | Track | Location | LMSC Winner | SLM Winner |
|---|---|---|---|---|
| March 9 | Southern National Motorsports Park | Kenly, North Carolina | Brandon Pierce | Bubba Pollard |
| March 23 | Hickory Motor Speedway | Hickory, North Carolina | Taylor Gray | Bubba Pollard |
| April 9 | Orange County Speedway | Rougemont, North Carolina | Lee Pulliam | N/A |
| May 3 | Ace Speedway | Altamahaw, North Carolina | Josh Berry | N/A |
| May 5 | Nashville Fairgrounds Speedway | Nashville, Tennessee | N/A | Josh Brock |
| May 18 | Motor Mile Speedway | Radford, Virginia | Bobby McCarty | Bubba Pollard |
| June 1 | Bristol Motor Speedway | Bristol, Tennessee | N/A | Stephen Nasse |
| June 8 | Langley Speedway | Hampton, Virginia | Deac McCaskill | N/A |
| June 22 | Dominion Raceway | Thornburg, Virginia | Josh Berry | N/A |
| July 13 | Carteret County Speedway | Swansboro, North Carolina | Josh Berry | N/A |
| August 3 | Hickory Motor Speedway | Hickory, North Carolina | Ryan Repko | Matt Craig |
| August 24 | Orange County Speedway | Rougemont, North Carolina | Bobby McCarty | Trevor Noles |
| November 2 | South Boston Speedway | South Boston, Virginia | Josh Berry | Matt Craig |

== Standings ==
=== Late Model Stock Car championship ===
(key) Bold – Pole position awarded by time. Italics – Pole position set by final practice results or rainout. * – Most laps led.

| Pos | Driver | SNM | HCY | ROU | ACE | MMS | LGY | DOM | CCS | HCY | ROU | SBO | Points |
|---|---|---|---|---|---|---|---|---|---|---|---|---|---|
| 1 | Bobby McCarty | 4 | 5 | 13 | 4* | 1 | 2 | **2*** | 12 | 3 | 1* | 2 | 325 |
| 2 | Josh Berry | 2* | 4 | 4 | 1 | **14*** | 9 | 1 | 1 | **6** | 19 | **1**** | 324 |
| 3 | Deac McCaskill | 3 | 7 | 23 | 3 | 7 | 1 | 7 | 2 | 10 | 5 | 23 | 274 |
| 4 | Brandon Pierce | **1** | 15 | 5 | 16 | 4 | 14 | 3 | 13 | 7 | 12 | 16 | 260 |
| 5 | Tyler Matthews | 15 | 18 | 10 | 14 | 9 | 10 | 9 | 7 | 11 | 7 | 9 | 244 |
| 6 | Mini Tyrrell | 19 | 12 | 8 | 8 | 8 | 15 | 4 | 8 | 24 | 11 | 8 | 238 |
| 7 | Layne Riggs | 6 | 24 | 25 | 20 | 20 | **5** | 5 | 4 | 4 | 17 | 4 | 231 |
| 8 | Justin Carroll | 10 | 22 | 18 | 23 | 2 | 6* | 16 | 14 | 17 | 4 | 6 | 228 |
| 9 | Taylor Gray | 13 | 1* | **2*** | 19 | 12 | 19 | | | 18 | 6 | 7 | 206 |
| 10 | Camden Gullie | 21 | 20 | 12 | 13 | 26 | 13 | 23 | 9 | 22 | 10 | 10 | 184 |
| 11 | Adam Lemke | 28 | 19 | 3 | 5 | 19 | 4 | 11 | | 13 | 13 | | 182 |
| 12 | Trevor Ward | 18 | 14 | 7 | 18 | 16 | 20 | 22 | 6 | 28 | 21 | 13 | 181 |
| 13 | Sammy Smith | | | | 9 | 3 | 3 | | 3 | 5 | 2 | | 173 |
| 14 | Stacy Puryear | 8 | 10 | 11 | 10 | 13 | 8 | 14 | 18 | | | | 172 |
| 15 | Ronald Hill | 23 | 26 | 29 | 15 | 10 | 24 | 10 | 16 | 29 | 9 | 11 | 161 |
| 16 | Craig Moore | 25 | 28 | 21 | 11 | 11 | | 13 | 23 | 2* | **20** | 21 | 158 |
| 17 | Jonathan Findley | 24 | 11 | DNQ | 12 | 25 | 12 | 19 | 19 | DNQ | 3 | 18 | 158 |
| 18 | Zack St. Onge | 16 | 8 | 6 | 6 | 23 | 25 | | | | | | 114 |
| 19 | Jessica Cann | | | DNQ | 17 | 17 | 16 | 18 | 24 | DNS | 16 | 15 | 112 |
| 20 | Tommy Lemons Jr. | 11 | 2 | 19 | 22 | 5 | DNS | | | | | | 109 |
| 21 | Drew Dollar | 7 | | | | 21 | 22 | | 21 | DNQ | 8 | 19 | 102 |
| 22 | Bradley McCaskill | 12 | **6** | 9 | 7 | | | | | | | | 100 |
| 23 | Brody Pope | 27 | 3 | | | 28 | | | | 8 | 22 | 17 | 93 |
| 24 | Cameron Bowen | 17 | 29 | DNQ | 21 | 27 | 7 | 20 | 22 | | | | 90 |
| 25 | Chad McCumbee | 14 | | | | 6 | | | **10*** | | | | 72 |
| 26 | Corey Heim | | | 17 | | | 17 | | | | | 3 | 62 |
| 27 | Ryan Repko | | | | | 15 | 23 | | | 1 | | | 62 |
| 28 | Justin S. Carroll | | | | | | 21 | 15 | 5 | DNQ | | | 60 |
| 29 | Ryan Millington | | 16 | | **2** | | | | | 25 | | | 58 |
| 30 | Terry Carroll | | | | | | 11 | 17 | 20 | DNQ | | | 53 |
| 31 | Jacob Heafner | | 17 | 20 | | | | | | 14 | | | 48 |
| 32 | Terry Dease | | | 14 | | | | | | | 18 | 20 | 47 |
| 33 | Timothy Peters | | | 16 | | | | | | | | 5 | 46 |
| 34 | Matt Cox | 20 | | | | 18 | | | 17 | | | | 44 |
| 35 | Myatt Snider | 9 | | 15 | | | | | | | | | 42 |
| 36 | Austin McDaniel | | 9 | | | | | | | 19 | | | 38 |
| 37 | Terry Brooks Jr. | 22 | | 28 | | 22 | | | | 23 | | | 37 |
| 38 | Lee Pulliam | | | 1 | | | | | | | | | 34 |
| 39 | Sarah Cornett-Ching | | | | | | | | | 20 | 15 | | 31 |
| 40 | Riley Herbst | 5 | | | | | | | | | | | 28 |
| 41 | Doug Barnes Jr. | | | | | | | 6 | | | | | 27 |
| 42 | Joshua Yeoman | | | 24 | | | | | 15 | | | | 27 |
| 43 | Leland Honeyman | DNQ | 21 | | 24 | | | | | DNQ | | | 25 |
| 44 | Michael Hardin | | | | | | | 8 | | | | | 25 |
| 45 | Mike Darne | | | | | | | | | 9 | | | 24 |
| 46 | Brandon Clements | | | | | | | | 11 | | | | 22 |
| 47 | Cole Glasson | | | | | | | | | 12 | | | 21 |
| 48 | Connor Mosack | | | | | | | | | | | 12 | 21 |
| 49 | Howie DiSavino III | | | | | | | 12 | | | | | 21 |
| 50 | Tanner Gray | | 13 | | | | | | | | | | 20 |
| 51 | Jared Fryar | | | | | | | | | | | 14 | 19 |
| 52 | Jeffrey Oakley | | | | | | | | | | 14 | | 19 |
| 53 | Charlie Watson | | | | | | | | | 15 | | | 18 |
| 54 | Mitch Walker | | | | | | | | | 16 | | | 17 |
| 55 | Brenden Queen | | | | | | 18 | | | | | | 15 |
| 56 | Ty Gibbs | | 27 | 26 | | | | | | | | | 13 |
| 57 | Mason Diaz | | | | | | | 21 | | | | | 12 |
| 58 | Matt Leicht | | | | | | | | | 21 | | | 12 |
| 59 | Carson Kvapil | | | 22 | | | | | | | | | 11 |
| 60 | Stuart Crews | | | | | | | | | | | 22 | 11 |
| 61 | Jason York | DNQ | | | 25 | | | | | | | | 10 |
| 62 | Vince Midas | | 23 | | | | | | | | | | 10 |
| 63 | Derek Kale | | | | | 24 | | | | | | | 9 |
| 64 | Dylon Wilson | | 25 | | | | | | | | | | 8 |
| 65 | Gage Painter | | | | | | | | | 26 | | | 7 |
| 66 | Ryan Wilson | 26 | | | | | | | | | | | 7 |
| 67 | Jeremy Burns | | | | | | | | | 27 | | | 6 |
| 68 | Mike Chambers | | | 27 | | | | | | | | | 6 |
| 69 | Quincy Adkins | | | | | | | | | DNQ | | | 2 |
| 70 | Josh Oakley | | | DNQ | | | | | | | | | 0 |
| 71 | R. D. Smith III | | | DNQ | | | | | | | | | 0 |
| Pos | Driver | SNM | HCY | ROU | ACE | MMS | LGY | DOM | CCS | HCY | ROU | SBO | Points |

=== Super Late Model Tour championship ===
(key) Bold – Pole position awarded by time. Italics – Pole position set by final practice results or rainout. * – Most laps led.

| Pos | Driver | SNM | HCY | NSH | MMS | BRI | HCY | ROU | SBO | Points |
|---|---|---|---|---|---|---|---|---|---|---|
| 1 | Matt Craig | 8 | 3 | **3** | **2*** | 6 | **1*** | **2*** | 1* | 253 |
| 2 | Jared Fryar | 4 | 5 | 5 | 9 | 13 | 6 | 6 | 5 | 211 |
| 3 | Nolan Pope | 18 | 15 | 15 | 13 | 8 | 10 | 7 | 4 | 174 |
| 4 | Tate Fogleman | 12 | 13 | | 4 | 28 | 4 | 15 | **3** | 153 |
| 5 | Kodie Conner | 11 | **7** | | 5 | | 8 | 14 | 13 | 142 |
| 6 | Stephen Nasse | 5 | | 12 | 3 | **1** | | 5 | | 142 |
| 7 | Molly Helmuth | 17 | 12 | 13 | 17 | | 13 | 9 | 10 | 140 |
| 8 | Corey Heim | | 4 | | | 7 | 7 | 4 | 6 | 137 |
| 9 | Bubba Pollard | **1*** | 1 | | 1 | | 3 | | | 135 |
| 10 | Brandon Setzer | 3 | 2 | | 10 | | 2 | 18 | | 131 |
| 11 | Jeff Batten | 26 | 16 | | 7 | | 17 | 11 | 12 | 109 |
| 12 | Carson Kvapil | | | | | | 9 | 10 | 2 | 78 |
| 13 | Justin Crider | 7 | | 20 | | 33 | 20 | | 11 | 77 |
| 14 | Mike Speeney | 6 | 11 | | 19 | | | 19 | | 77 |
| 15 | Matt Wallace | 24 | | | 16 | 14 | | 8 | | 71 |
| 16 | Dan Speeney | 14 | 6 | | 11 | | | | | 68 |
| 17 | Colin Garrett | 19 | | | 8 | | | | 8 | 64 |
| 18 | Trevor Noles | 9 | | | | 9 | | 1 | | 58 |
| 19 | Steve Wallace | 25 | | | | 3 | | 16 | | 56 |
| 20 | Bronson Butcher | | 9 | | | | | | 7 | 50 |
| 21 | Tovia Grynewicz | | | | DNQ | | | 13 | 9 | 46 |
| 22 | Preston Peltier | 2 | | | 22 | | | | | 43 |
| 23 | Tim Hollis | 21 | 18 | 22 | | | | | | 38 |
| 24 | Trey Bayne | 20 | 19 | 25 | | 32 | | | | 36 |
| 25 | Tyler Church | 16 | 17 | | | | | | | 33 |
| 26 | Giovanni Bromante | | | 8 | | 18 | | 3 | | 31 |
| 27 | Donnie Wilson | | | 2 | | | 5 | | | 29 |
| 28 | Jared Irvan | | | | 23 | | 16 | | | 27 |
| 29 | Josh Brock | | | 1** | 6 | 4 | | | | 27 |
| 30 | Wyatt Alexander | | 8* | | | | | | | 27 |
| 31 | Anthony Cataldi | 27 | 14 | | | | | | | 25 |
| 32 | Josh Berry | | 10 | | | | | | | 24 |
| 33 | Brandon Lynn | 10 | | | | | | | | 23 |
| 34 | T. J. Duke | | | | | | 11 | | | 22 |
| 35 | Derek Lemke | | | | | | 12 | | | 21 |
| 36 | Kyle Plott | | | | | | | 12 | | 21 |
| 37 | Ryan Moore | | | | 12 | | | | | 21 |
| 38 | Mason Diaz | 13 | | | | | | | | 20 |
| 39 | Amber Balcaen | | | | 14 | | | | | 19 |
| 40 | Brandon Johnson | | | | | | 14 | | | 19 |
| 41 | Dylan Bigley | | | | | | 15 | | | 18 |
| 42 | Gracie Trotter | 15 | | | | | | | | 18 |
| 43 | Toni Breidinger | | | | 15 | | | | | 18 |
| 44 | Erik Nash | | | | | | | 17 | | 16 |
| 45 | Jett Noland | | | 17 | 18 | 21 | | | | 15 |
| 46 | Lee Tissot | | | 26 | | | 18 | | | 15 |
| 47 | Daniel Webster | | | | | | 19 | | | 14 |
| 48 | Josh Reeves | | | | 20 | | | | | 13 |
| 49 | Gus Dean | | | | | | 21 | | | 12 |
| 50 | Trey Jarrell | | | | 21 | | | | | 12 |
| 51 | Gabriel Fogg | 22 | | | | | | | | 11 |
| 52 | Harold Crooms | | | | | | 22 | | | 11 |
| 53 | Jody Measamer | 23 | | | | | | | | 10 |
| 54 | Kyle Ivey | | | | | | 23 | | | 10 |
| 55 | Christian Rose | | DNS | 29 | | | | | | 4 |
| 56 | Alexa Anderson | | | | | 24 | | | | |
| 57 | Anthony Sergi | | | 6 | | 5 | | | | |
| 58 | Augie Grill | | | | | 15 | | | | |
| 59 | Austin Kunert | | | 10 | | 19 | | | | |
| 60 | Austin Reed | | | | | 11 | | | | |
| 61 | Brandon Herbert | | | | | 26 | | | | |
| 62 | Brandon Watson | | | | | 12 | | | | |
| 63 | Casey Roderick | | | 11 | | 2* | | | | |
| 64 | Chris Davidson | | | 23 | | | | | | |
| 65 | Cole Williams | | | 14 | | | | | | |
| 66 | Colton Nelson | | | 33 | | | | | | |
| 67 | Connor Okrzesik | | | 24 | | 30 | | | | |
| 68 | Greg Van Alst | | | 30 | | 31 | | | | |
| 69 | Hunter Jack | | | 18 | | 23 | | | | |
| 70 | Jack Dossey III | | | 7 | | 16 | | | | |
| 71 | Jake Crum | | | | | 20 | | | | |
| 72 | Jeff Gordon | | | | | 25 | | | | |
| 73 | Jeremy Pate | | | 9 | | 10 | | | | |
| 74 | John Coffman | | | | | 27 | | | | |
| 75 | Johnny VanDoorn | | | 4 | | | | | | |
| 76 | Johnny Brazier | | | 32 | | | | | | |
| 77 | Kyle Bryant | | | 19 | | | | | | |
| 78 | Logan Runyon | | | 21 | | 17 | | | | |
| 79 | Mark Wilkins | | | | | 29 | | | | |
| 80 | Michael House | | | 28 | | | | | | |
| 81 | Scott Tomasik | | | 16 | | 22 | | | | |
| 82 | Spencer Wauters | | | 31 | | | | | | |
| 83 | Trey Craig | | | | | DNQ | | | | |
| 84 | Wayne Grubb | | | 27 | | | | | | |
| Pos | Driver | SNM | HCY | NSH | MMS | BRI | HCY | ROU | SBO | Points |

== See also ==
- 2019 Monster Energy NASCAR Cup Series
- 2019 NASCAR Xfinity Series
- 2019 NASCAR Gander Outdoors Truck Series
- 2019 ARCA Menards Series
- 2019 NASCAR K&N Pro Series East
- 2019 NASCAR K&N Pro Series West
- 2019 NASCAR Whelen Modified Tour
- 2019 NASCAR Pinty's Series
- 2019 NASCAR Whelen Euro Series
- 2019 NASCAR PEAK Mexico Series
