= Austin Nason =

American racing driver

- Born: January 23, 1996 (age 30) Roscoe, Illinois, U.S.

CARS Super Late Model Tour career
- Debut season: 2020
- Years active: 2020
- Starts: 2
- Championships: 0
- Wins: 0
- Poles: 0
- Best finish: N/A in 2020
- Statistics up to date as of November 20, 2026.

Austin Nason (born January 23, 1996) is an American semi-retired professional stock car racing driver who has competed in the CARS Tour and the ASA STARS National Tour.

Nason retired from full-time competition following the 2025 season.

Nason has also competed in series such as the ASA Midwest Tour, where he has multiple wins and a former Rookie of the Year, the ASA Southern Super Series, the Big 8 Late Model Series, and the NASCAR Local Racing Series.

== Motorsports results ==
=== Stock car career summary ===
Season	Series	Team	Races	Wins	Top 5	Top 10	Points	Position
2020	CARS Super Late Model Tour	Austin Nason Motorsports	2	0	1	1	0	N/A
2023	ASA STARS National Tour	Austin Nason Motorsports	10	0	1	7	488	5th
2024	ASA STARS National Tour	Austin Nason Motorsports	10	0	4	7	548	5th
2025	ASA STARS National Tour	Austin Nason Motorsports	11	0	1	5	521	10th
2026	ASA STARS National Tour	Austin Nason Motorsports	3	0	0	1		

=== CARS Super Late Model Tour ===
(key)

CARS Super Late Model Tour results
Year	Team	No.	Make	1	2	3	4	5	6	7	8	CSLMTC	Pts	Ref
2020	Austin Nason Motorsports	14N	Ford	SNM	HCY	JEN	HCY	FCS	BRI; 16	FLC	NSH; 5	N/A	0	

=== ASA STARS National Tour ===
(key) (Bold – Pole position awarded by qualifying time. Italics – Pole position earned by points standings or practice time. * – Most laps led. ** – All laps led.)

ASA STARS National Tour results
Year	Team	No.	Make	1	2	3	4	5	6	7	8	9	10	11	12	ASNTC	Pts	Ref
2023	Austin Nason Motorsports	14N	Ford	FIF; 7	MAD; 15		HCY; 8			WIR; 10						5th	488	
2023	Austin Nason Motorsports	14	Ford			NWS; 14		MLW; 13	AND; 8		TOL; 6	WIN; 8	NSV; 4			5th	488	
2024	Austin Nason Motorsports	14N	Ford	NSM; 7	FIF; 26	HCY; 12			AND; 2				NSV; 6			5th	548	
2024	Austin Nason Motorsports	14	Ford				MAD; 3	MLW; 12		OWO; 2	TOL; 4	WIN; 8				5th	548	
2025	Austin Nason Motorsports	14N	Ford	NSM; 13	FIF; 16	DOM; 9	HCY; 14	NPS; 5	MAD; 6	SLG; 15	AND; 7	OWO; 19	TOL; 13	WIN	NSV; 7	10th	521	
2026	Austin Nason Motorsports	14N	Ford	NSM	FIF	HCY	SLG; 14	MAD; 10	NPS	OWO	TRI	WIN	NSV; 29	NSM		-*	-*	
