= Jett Noland =

American racing driver

- Born: November 12, 2003 (age 23) Groveland, Florida, U.S.

CARS Super Late Model Tour career
- Debut season: 2018
- Current team: Jett Motorsports
- Car number: 50
- Engine: Chevrolet
- Starts: 4
- Wins: 0
- Poles: 0
- Best finish: 45th in 2019
- Finished last season: 45th (2019)

NASCAR FedEx Freight Truck Series career
- 3 races run over 1 year
- 2021 position: 68th
- Best finish: 68th (2021)
- First race: 2021 BrakeBest Select 159 (Daytona RC)
- Last race: 2021 Corn Belt 150 (Knoxville)
Wins	Top tens	Poles
0	0	0

Stadium Super Trucks career
- Years active: 2020–2021
- Car number: 50
- Starts: 8
- Wins: 0
- Podiums: 0
- Poles: 0
- Best finish: 8th in 2021

Previous series
- 2020 2019: Trans-Am Series; NASCAR K&N Pro Series East

Awards
- 2020: Trans-Am Series TA2 Rookie of the Year
- Statistics up to date as of December 30, 2021.

Jett Noland (born November 12, 2003) is an American professional racing driver who last competed part-time for Niece Motorsports in both the NASCAR Camping World Truck Series, driving the Nos. 44 and 45 Chevrolet Silverados, and the ARCA Menards Series, driving the No. 50 Chevrolet SS. He has also competed in Stadium Super Trucks, super late model racing, and the Trans-Am Series.

== Racing career ==
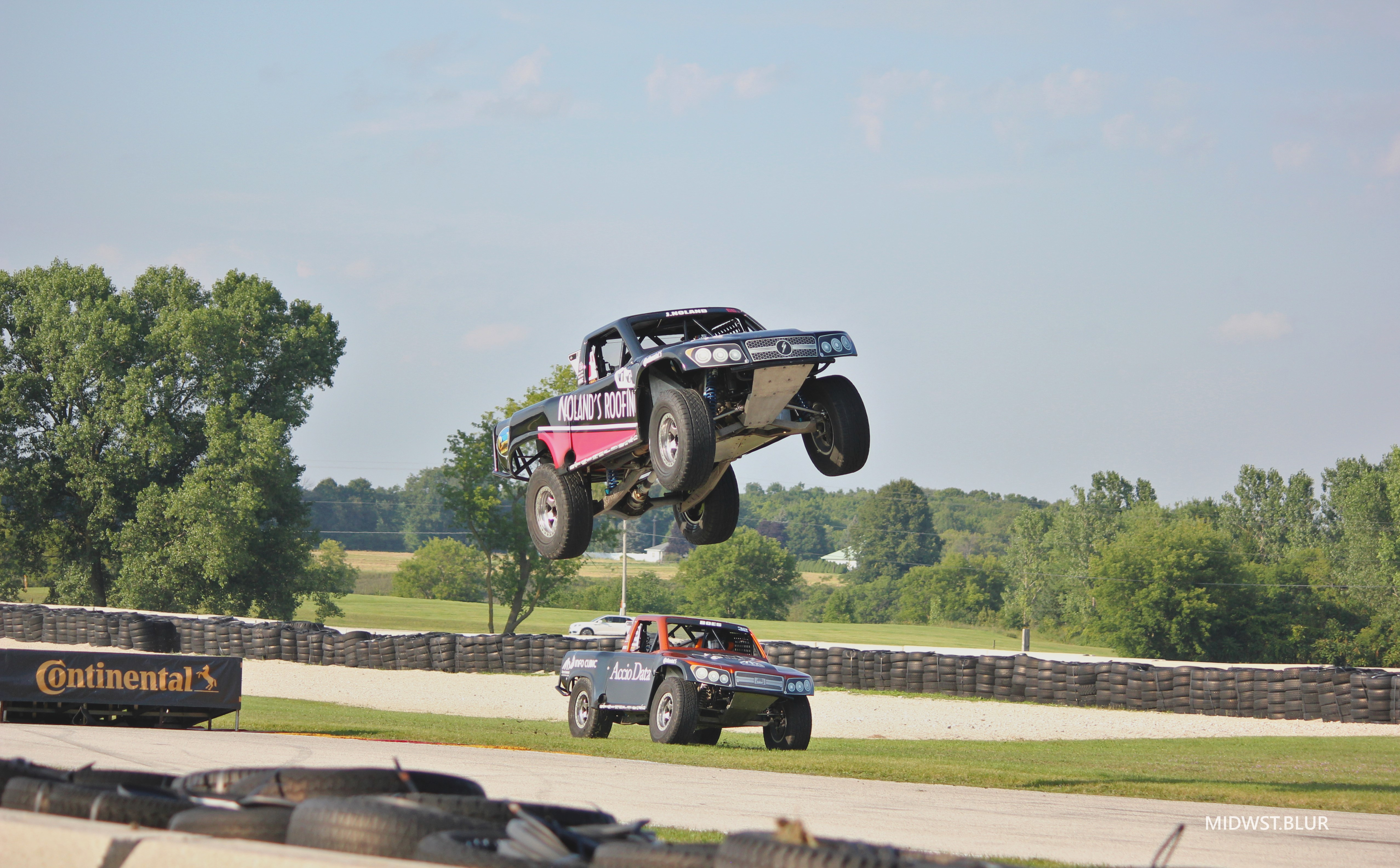
Noland's Stadium Super Truck airborne at Road America in 2020

Noland's racing career started in go-kart racing before later moving up to Pro Trucks.

In May 2017, Noland and the team his parents own, Next Level Motorsports, signed with Cape Motorsports to start a driver development program for Noland, including races in go-karts, Legends cars and an appearance in the Formula 4 United States Championship.

In November 2018, Noland's parents created Hype Motorsports Group for Noland to co-pilot a Honda TCR entry in the 2019 Michelin Pilot Challenge with Victor Gonzalez Jr., who had previously served as Noland's driver coach in CARS Super Late Model Tour competition. During the course of the season, however, Noland did not enter any Pilot Challenge TCR races.

In 2019, Noland raced super late models at New Smyrna Speedway and the Southern Super Series, winning SLM Rookie of the Year at New Smyrna.

To start off his 2020 season, Noland won the Pro Late Model portion of the RedEye 50/50 at New Smyrna on January 5, 2020. On February 6, it was announced that Noland would join Niece Motorsports to make his NASCAR Truck Series in the team's No. 44 truck in six races: Richmond, Iowa, Gateway, Bristol, Martinsville and Phoenix. However, due to financial problems after the COVID-19 pandemic, Noland would not run any of those races for Niece in 2020 and would not make his Truck Series debut until 2021. On February 8, Noland won the pro late model feature for that night of the World Series of Asphalt after incidents with Jamie Skinner and Connor Mosack, leaving both unhappy with Noland. A night later at the same track, Skinner wrecked Noland out of another pro late model race and was later parked for rough driving due to the incident.

In August 2020, Noland made his Stadium Super Trucks debut at Road America; he had been at the track to compete in the Trans-Am Series' TA2 class. Noland also continued to race SLMs for team owners Mike Cope and Anthony Campi in the summer of 2020.

Noland rejoined Niece in February 2021 for a six-race Truck Series schedule beginning with the BrakeBest Select 159 on Daytona International Speedway's infield road course. He also returned to the Stadium Super Trucks at the Grand Prix of St. Petersburg in April.

== Motorsports career results ==
=== Stock car career summary ===
Season	Series	Team	Races	Wins	Top 5	Top 10	Points	Position
2018	CARS Super Late Model Tour	Greg Noland	1	0	0	0	0	N/A
2019	CARS Super Late Model Tour	Pat Jett	3	0	0	0	15	45th
2019	NASCAR K&N Pro Series East	Jett Motorsports	1	0	0	0	33	37th
2020	CARS Super Late Model Tour	Anthony Campi	1	0	0	0	0	N/A
2021	CARS Super Late Model Tour	Anthony Campi	3	0	0	2	0	N/A
2021	ARCA Menards Series	Niece Motorsports	1	0	0	0	33	89th
2021	NASCAR Camping World Truck Series	Niece Motorsports	3	0	0	0	20	68th
2022	CARS Pro Late Model Tour	Jett Noland Motorsports	1	0	1	1	30	33rd
2023	ASA STARS National Tour	Jett Noland Motorsports	4	0	0	1	150	24th
2024	ASA STARS National Tour	Jett Noland Motorsports	3	0	1	2	151	22nd
2025	CARS Pro Late Model Tour	Jett Noland Motorsports	1	0	1	1	39	46th
2026	ASA STARS National Tour	Wilson Motorsports	3	0	0	0		

=== NASCAR ===
(key) (Bold – Pole position awarded by qualifying time. Italics – Pole position earned by points standings or practice time. * – Most laps led.)

==== Camping World Truck Series ====
NASCAR Camping World Truck Series results
Year	Team	No.	Make	1	2	3	4	5	6	7	8	9	10	11	12	13	14	15	16	17	18	19	20	21	22	NCWTC	Pts	Ref
2021	Niece Motorsports	44	Chevy	DAY	DAY; 29	LVS	ATL	BRI	RCH; 26	KAN	DAR	COA	CLT	TEX	NSH	POC										68th	20	
2021	Niece Motorsports	45	Chevy														KNX; 37	GLN	GTW	DAR	BRI	LVS	TAL	MAR	PHO	68th	20	

==== K&N Pro Series East ====
NASCAR K&N Pro Series East results
Year	Team	No.	Make	1	2	3	4	5	6	7	8	9	10	11	12	NKNPSEC	Pts	Ref
2019	Jett Motorsports	09	Toyota	NSM	BRI	SBO	SBO	MEM	NHA	IOW	GLN	BRI; 11	GTW	NHA	DOV	37th	33	

=== ARCA Menards Series ===
(key) (Bold – Pole position awarded by qualifying time. Italics – Pole position earned by points standings or practice time. * – Most laps led.)

ARCA Menards Series results
Year	Team	No.	Make	1	2	3	4	5	6	7	8	9	10	11	12	13	14	15	16	17	18	19	20	AMSC	Pts	Ref
2021	Niece Motorsports	50	Chevy	DAY	PHO	TAL	KAN	TOL	CLT	MOH	POC; 11	ELK	BLN	IOW	WIN	GLN	MCH	ISF	MLW	DSF	BRI	SLM	KAN	89th	33	

=== Stadium Super Trucks ===
(key) (Bold – Pole position. Italics – Fastest qualifier. * – Most laps led.)

Stadium Super Trucks results
Year	1	2	3	4	5	6	7	8	9	10	SSTC	Pts	Ref
2020	ADE	ADE	ADE	ROA; 6	ROA; 4						N/A^{2}	–	
2021	STP; 8	**STP**; 6	MOH	MOH	MOH; 6	MOH; 6	NSH; 4	NSH; 8	LBH	LBH	8th	95	

=== CARS Super Late Model Tour ===
(key)

CARS Super Late Model Tour results
Year	Team	No.	Make	1	2	3	4	5	6	7	8	9	CSLMTC	Pts	Ref
2018	Greg Noland	50	Toyota	MYB	NSH	ROU	HCY	BRI	AND; 25	HCY	ROU	SBO	N/A	0	
2019	Pat Jett	50	Chevy	SNM	HCY	NSH; 17	MMS; 18	BRI; 21	HCY	ROU	SBO		45th	15	
2020	Anthony Campi	81	Toyota	SNM	HCY	JEN	HCY	FCS	BRI	FLC	NSH; 33		N/A	0	
2021	Anthony Campi	81	Toyota	HCY	**GPS**; 6	NSH; 11	JEN	HCY	MMS	TCM; 10	SBO		N/A	0	

=== CARS Pro Late Model Tour ===
(key)

CARS Pro Late Model Tour results
Year	Team	No.	Make	1	2	3	4	5	6	7	8	9	10	11	12	13	CPLMTC	Pts	Ref
2022	Jett Noland Motorsports	50	Chevy	CRW	HCY	GPS	FCS	TCM; 3	HCY	ACE	MMS	TCM	ACE	SBO	CRW		33rd	30	
2025	Jett Noland Motorsports	50	Chevy	AAS	CDL; 3	OCS	ACE	NWS	CRW	HCY	HCY	AND	FLC	SBO	TCM	NWS	46th	39	

=== ASA STARS National Tour ===
(key) (Bold – Pole position awarded by qualifying time. Italics – Pole position earned by points standings or practice time. * – Most laps led. ** – All laps led.)

ASA STARS National Tour results
Year	Team	No.	Make	1	2	3	4	5	6	7	8	9	10	11	12	ASNTC	Pts	Ref
2023	Jett Noland Motorsports	50	Chevy	FIF; 26												24th	150	
2023	Jett Noland Motorsports	50N	Toyota		MAD; 20		HCY; 9	MLW	AND	WIR	TOL	WIN	NSV			24th	150	
2023	Jett Noland Motorsports	50	Toyota			NWS; 13										24th	150	
2024	Jett Noland Motorsports	50	Toyota	NSM; 2	FIF; 9	HCY; 16	MAD	MLW	AND	OWO	TOL	WIN	NSV			22nd	151	
2026	Wilson Motorsports	20	Toyota	NSM	FIF; 18	HCY; 17	SLG	MAD	NPS	OWO	TRI; 11	WIN	NSV	NSM		-*	-*	

^{*} Season still in progress
^{1} Ineligible for series points
^{2} Standings were not recorded by the series for the 2020 season
