= Ryan Millington =

American racing driver (born 2001)

- Born: September 5, 2001 (age 25) Statesville, North Carolina, U.S.

CARS Late Model Stock Tour career
- Debut season: 2016
- Years active: 2016, 2018–present
- Starts: 54
- Championships: 0
- Wins: 2
- Poles: 4
- Best finish: 4th in 2024
- Statistics up to date as of August 9, 2026.

Ryan Millington (born September 5, 2001) is an American professional stock car racing driver. He currently competes in the zMAX CARS Tour, driving the No. 40 for TS Racing. He is a longtime competitor of the series, having made his debut in 2018, and having won two races in 2020 and 2024, four poles, and a best points finish of fourth in 2024.

Millington has also previously competed in the Virginia Late Model Triple Crown Series, the World Series of Asphalt Stock Car Racing, the INEX Summer Shootout Series, and the NASCAR Weekly Series, as well as having competed in the Thunder Road Harley-Davidson 200 at South Boston Speedway, and the South Carolina 400 at Florence Motor Speedway.

== Motorsports results ==
=== CARS Late Model Stock Car Tour ===
(key) (Bold – Pole position awarded by qualifying time. Italics – Pole position earned by points standings or practice time. * – Most laps led. ** – All laps led.)

CARS Late Model Stock Car Tour results
Year	Team	No.	Make	1	2	3	4	5	6	7	8	9	10	11	12	13	14	15	16	17	CLMSCTC	Pts	Ref
2016	Scott Millington Motorsports	17	Chevy	SNM	ROU	HCY	TCM	GRE	ROU	CON	MYB	HCY; Wth	SNM								N/A	0	
2018	Scott Millington Motorsports	17	Chevy	TCM	MYB	ROU	HCY; 20	BRI	ACE; 8	CCS	KPT	HCY	WKS	OCS	SBO						31st	38	
2019	Robert Saville	15	Chevy	SNM	HCY; 16	ROU	ACE; 2	MMS	LGY	DOM	CCS	HCY; 25	ROU	SBO							29th	58	
2020	Bob Saville	17	Chevy	SNM	ACE; 1	HCY; 23	HCY	DOM	FCS	LGY	CCS	FLO	GRE								30th	44	
2021	Bob Saville	15	Chevy	DIL	HCY	OCS	ACE	CRW	LGY	DOM	HCY; 26	MMS	TCM	FLC	WKS	SBO					66th	7	
2022	Bob Saville	15	Chevy	CRW	HCY	GRE	AAS	FCS	LGY	DOM	HCY	ACE	MMS	NWS	TCM; 18						37th	46	
2022	Bob Saville	17	Chevy													**ACE**; 4	SBO	CRW			37th	46	
2023	Saville Millington Motorsports	15	Chevy	SNM; 5*	FLC; 27	HCY; 11	ACE; 2	NWS; 2	LGY; 16	DOM; 14	CRW; 15	HCY; 14	ACE; 3	TCM; 5	WKS; 8	AAS; 9	SBO; 7	TCM; 7	CRW; 19		5th	367	
2024	Saville Millington Motorsports	15	Chevy	SNM; 22	HCY; 8	AAS; 7	OCS; 7	**ACE**; 3	TCM; 17	LGY; 6	DOM; 6	CRW; 10	HCY; 14	NWS; 9	ACE; 14*	WCS; 5	FLC; 1	**SBO**; 3*	TCM; 16	NWS; 9	4th	418	
2025	Saville Millington Motorsports	15	Chevy	AAS; 5	WCS; 13	CDL; 27	OCS; 16	ACE; 2	NWS; 24	LGY	DOM	CRW	HCY; DNQ	AND	FLC	SBO; 24					21st	204	
2025	TS Racing	40	Chevy														TCM; 26	NWS			21st	204	
2026	TS Racing	40	Chevy	SNM; 15	WCS; DNQ	NSV	CRW	ACE; 27	LGY	DOM	NWS										39th	86	
2026	N/A	9	N/A									HCY; 4	AND	FLC	TCM	NPS	SBO				39th	86	
