= Austin Somero =

American racing driver

- Born: Taylors, South Carolina, U.S.

CARS Late Model Stock Tour career
- Debut season: 2020
- Current team: Somero Motorsports
- Years active: 2020, 2022, 2025–present
- Car number: 99
- Starts: 6
- Championships: 0
- Wins: 0
- Poles: 0
- Best finish: 33rd in 2020
- Statistics up to date as of April 26, 2026.

Austin "Willie" Somero (birth date unknown) is an American professional stock car racing driver. He currently competes in the zMAX CARS Tour, driving the No. 99 for Somero Motorsports.

Somero has also competed in series such as the Virginia Late Model Triple Crown Series, the All-Pro Limited Late Model Series, the Southeast Limited Late Model Series, and the Mid-Atlantic Street Stock Championship Series, and is a former competitor at the now defunct Myrtle Beach Speedway and Greenville-Pickens Speedway.

== Motorsports results ==
=== CARS Late Model Stock Car Tour ===
(key) (Bold – Pole position awarded by qualifying time. Italics – Pole position earned by points standings or practice time. * – Most laps led. ** – All laps led.)

CARS Late Model Stock Car Tour results
Year	Team	No.	Make	1	2	3	4	5	6	7	8	9	10	11	12	13	14	15	CLMSCTC	Pts	Ref
2020	Ted Somero	99S	Chevy	SNM	ACE	HCY	HCY	DOM	FCS	LGY	CCS	FLO; 20	GRE; 9						33rd	37	
2022	Ted Somero	99S	Chevy	CRW	HCY	GRE; 12	AAS	FCS	LGY	DOM	HCY	ACE	MMS	NWS	TCM	ACE	SBO	CRW	53rd	21	
2025	Somero Motorsports	99	Chevy	AAS	WCS	CDL	OCS	ACE	NWS	LGY	DOM	CRW	HCY	AND	FLC	SBO	TCM; 22	NWS	85th	20	
2026	Somero Motorsports	99	Chevy	SNM; 24	WCS; DNQ	NSV	CRW; 30	ACE	LGY	DOM	NWS	HCY	AND	FLC	TCM	NPS	SBO		56th	35	
