= Matt Leicht =

American racing driver

- Born: November 8, 1989 (age 37) Asheville, North Carolina, U.S.

CARS Late Model Stock Tour career
- Debut season: 2017
- Years active: 2017, 2019, 2021, 2025–present
- Starts: 5
- Championships: 0
- Wins: 0
- Poles: 0
- Best finish: 58th in 2019
- Statistics up to date as of October 12, 2026.

Matt Leicht (born November 8, 1989) is an American professional stock car racing driver. He currently competes in the zMAX CARS Tour, driving the No. 06 Ford for LTD Racing.

Leicht has also competed in series such as the SouthEast Super Trucks Series, the Virginia Late Model Triple Crown Series, the UARA STARS Late Model Series. and the NASCAR Local Racing Series,

== Motorsports results ==
=== CARS Late Model Stock Car Tour ===
(key) (Bold – Pole position awarded by qualifying time. Italics – Pole position earned by points standings or practice time. * – Most laps led. ** – All laps led.)

CARS Late Model Stock Car Tour results
Year	Team	No.	Make	1	2	3	4	5	6	7	8	9	10	11	12	13	14	15	CLMSCTC	Pts	Ref
2017	Matt Leicht	2L	Ford	CON	DOM	DOM	HCY	HCY	BRI	AND	ROU	TCM; 17	ROU	HCY	CON	SBO			60th	16	
2019	Rick Parries	84	Chevy	SNM	HCY	ROU	ACE	MMS	LGY	DOM	CCS	HCY; 21	ROU	SBO					58th	12	
2021	N/A	2L	Chevy	DIL	HCY; 24	OCS	ACE	CRW	LGY	DOM	HCY	MMS	TCM	FLC	WKS	SBO			64th	9	
2025	LTD Racing	23	Ford	AAS	WCS	CDL	OCS	ACE	NWS	LGY	DOM	CRW	HCY	AND	FLC	SBO	TCM; 14	NWS	69th	28	
2026	LTD Racing	06	Ford	SNM	WCS	NSV	CRW	ACE	LGY	DOM	NWS	HCY; 27	AND	FLC	TCM	NPS	SBO		93rd	15	
