= Jonathan Findley =

American racing driver

- Born: November 18, 1998 (age 27) Bristow, Virginia, U.S.

CARS Late Model Stock Tour career
- Debut season: 2019
- Years active: 2019–present
- Starts: 40
- Championships: 0
- Wins: 1
- Poles: 0
- Best finish: 7th in 2020
- Statistics up to date as of October 22, 2025.

Jonathan Findley (born November 18, 1998) is an American professional stock car racing driver. He last competed in the zMAX CARS Tour, driving the No. 4F for AJ Motorsports. He a former development driver for the now defunct BK Racing.

On August 9, 2020, Findley won his first and only CARS Tour victory at Dominion Raceway.

Findley has also competed in the Dirty Dozen Series, the Virginia Late Model Triple Crown Series, the Paramount Kia Big 10 Challenge, and the NASCAR Weekly Series.

== Motorsports results ==
=== CARS Late Model Stock Car Tour ===
(key) (Bold – Pole position awarded by qualifying time. Italics – Pole position earned by points standings or practice time. * – Most laps led. ** – All laps led.)

CARS Late Model Stock Car Tour results
Year	Team	No.	Make	1	2	3	4	5	6	7	8	9	10	11	12	13	14	15	16	17	CLMSCTC	Pts	Ref
2019	John Findley	4	Ford	SNM; 24	HCY; 11	ROU; DNQ	ACE; 12	MMS; 25		DOM; 19	CCS; 19		ROU; 3	SBO; 18							17th	158	
2019	Craig Moore	1	Chevy						LGY; 12												17th	158	
2019	John Findley	28	Ford									HCY; DNQ									17th	158	
2020	Lee Faulk Racing	4	Chevy	SNM; 8	ACE; 24	HCY; 19	HCY; 17	DOM; 1	FCS; 11	LGY; 9	CCS; 15	FLO; 10	GRE; 5								7th	213	
2021	John Findley	4	Ford	DIL; 20	HCY; 6	OCS; 24	ACE; 10	CRW; 7	LGY; 19	DOM; 20		MMS; 20	TCM; 20	FLC; 18	WKS; 16	SBO; 25					15th	202	
2021	John Findley	41	Ford								HCY; 14										15th	202	
2022	John Findley	4F	Ford	CRW	HCY	GRE; 22	AAS	FCS	LGY	DOM; 5											34th	61	
2022	John Findley	28	Ford								HCY; 11	ACE	MMS	NWS	TCM	ACE	SBO	CRW			34th	61	
2023	Derek Peebles Motorsports	4F	Chevy	SNM; 21	FLC	HCY	ACE	NWS	LGY												42nd	26	
2023	N/A	45	N/A							DOM; 22	CRW	HCY	ACE	TCM; 31	WKS	AAS	SBO	TCM	CRW		42nd	26	
2024	Derek Peebles Motorsports	28	Chevy	SNM; DNQ																	N/A	0	
2024	N/A	44F	N/A		HCY; 22	AAS	OCS	ACE	TCM	LGY											N/A	0	
2024	N/A	4F	Chevy								DOM; 18	CRW	HCY	NWS	ACE	WCS	FLC	SBO	TCM	NWS	N/A	0	
2025	AJ Motorsports	4F	N/A	AAS	WCS	CDL	OCS	ACE	NWS	LGY	DOM; 11	CRW	HCY	AND	FLC	SBO	TCM	NWS			63rd	31	
