= 2024 ASA STARS National Tour =

2nd season of the ASA STARS National Tour

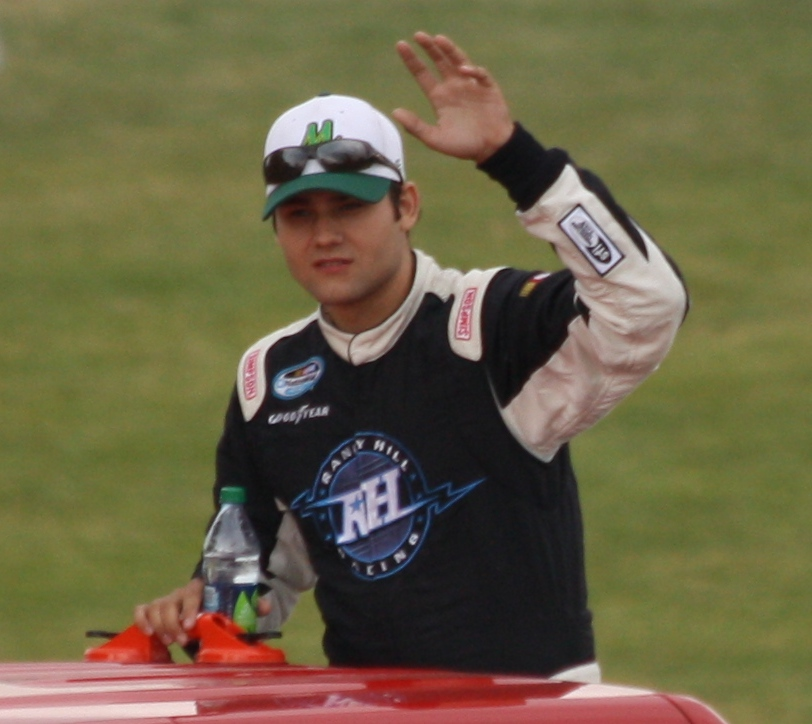
Casey Roderick, the 2024 ASA STARS National Tour champion

The 2024 ASA STARS National Tour was the 2nd season of the ASA STARS National Tour, a stock car racing series. It began at New Smyrna Speedway with the Clyde Hart Memorial 200 on February 13, and ended at Nashville Fairgrounds Speedway with the All American 400 on November 3.

Ty Majeski entered the season as the defending champion, but did not run a full season to defend his title. Casey Roderick went on to win his first series championship.

== Schedule ==
No.	Race title	Track	Date
1	Clyde Hart Memorial 200	New Smyrna Speedway, New Smyrna Beach, Florida	February 13
2	Sunshine State 200	Five Flags Speedway, Pensacola, Florida	March 24
3	Tar Heel 250	Hickory Motor Speedway, Hickory, North Carolina	May 23
4	Capital 200	Madison International Speedway, Oregon, Wisconsin	June 14
5	Father's Day 100	Milwaukee Mile, West Allis, Wisconsin	June 16
6	Redbud 400	Anderson Speedway, Anderson, Indiana	July 20
7	Michigan 300	Owosso Speedway, Ovid, Michigan	August 25
8	Glass City 200	Toledo Speedway, Toledo, Ohio	September 14
9	Winchester 400	Winchester Speedway, Winchester, Indiana	October 13
10	All American 400	Nashville Fairgrounds Speedway, Nashville, Tennessee	November 3

== Results and standings ==
=== Races ===
No.	Race	Fastest qualifier	Most laps led	Winning driver
1	Clyde Hart Memorial 200	Conner Jones	Ty Majeski	Bubba Pollard
2	Sunshine State 200	Matt Craig	Cole Butcher	Cole Butcher
3	Tar Heel 250	Brent Crews	Brent Crews	Cole Butcher
4	Capital 200	Ty Majeski	Ty Majeski	Ty Majeski
5	Father's Day 100	Casey Roderick	Ty Majeski	Dawson Sutton
6	Redbud 400	Cole Butcher	Kyle Steckly	Kyle Steckly
7	Michigan 300	Casey Roderick	Chandler Smith	Chandler Smith
8	Glass City 200	Casey Roderick	Casey Roderick	Casey Roderick
9	Winchester 400	Casey Roderick	Ty Majeski	Cole Butcher
10	All American 400	Casey Roderick	Dawson Sutton	Jake Garcia

=== Drivers' championship ===
(key) Bold - Pole position awarded by time. Italics - Pole position set by final practice results or rainout. * – Most laps led.

Pos	Driver	NSM	FIF	HCY	MAD	MLW	AND	OWO	TOL	WIN	NSV	Points
1	Casey Roderick	3	11	2	2	3	6	**5**	**1***	**5**	**2**	743
2	Kyle Steckly	8	19	20	6	11	1*	6	6	3	12	573
3	Cole Butcher	9	1	1	14	2	**7**			1	14	572
4	Dawson Sutton	24	23	3	13	1	16	4	18	17	3*	551
5	Austin Nason	7	26	12	3	12	2	2	4	8	6	548
6	Gio Ruggiero	5	3	17		7	3		2	10	4	531
7	Billy VanMeter	27	12	15	20	4	5	12	7	9	19	423
8	Albert Francis	17	14		10	10	10	9	13	12	13	296
9	Derek Kraus	12		8	11	8	4		16			296
10	Stephen Nasse	22	2	7			9			20	5	294
11	Jonathan Knee	18			9	15		10	5	13	16	290
12	Ty Majeski	16			**1***	DSQ*				2*		285
13	Caden Kvapil	DNQ	24	22	4	5	12					259
14	Matt Craig	14	**5**	4							9	231
15	Chase Burda						14	7	12	11	22	227
16	Bubba Pollard	1	17	6	19							217
17	Gavan Boschele			23				3	3	7		211
18	Michael Hinde	29	6	14						14	25	178
19	Chase Pinsonneault							8	8	4		177
20	Blake Rowe							13	10	18	18	163
21	Jake Finch	10	7								8	155
22	Jett Noland	2	9	16								151
23	Brent Crews	4		**18***								131
24	Conner Jones	**13**	13	11								129
25	Connor Okrzesik		20	9							20	128
26	Gabe Sommers	DNQ			7	14						117
27	Jake Garcia									15	1	109
28	Chase Elliott	6		21								100
29	Chandler Smith							1*				95
30	William Sawalich	11		10								91
31	Jeff Storm				15	9						85
32	Ty Fredrickson	21			12							84
33	Michael Simko							11	14			80
34	Dylan Fetcho		29								7	76
35	Dylan Bates						15				15	74
36	Evan Shotko							14	21			74
37	Dustin Smith		22	13								69
38	Kasey Kleyn		27								11	66
39	Josh Berry			5								66
40	Chris Munson							20		21		63
41	Levon Van Der Geest				5							62
42	Timothy Watson	15	28									61
43	Jacob Gomes		4									59
44	Dakoda Armstrong						8					59
45	Colby Howard		8									57
46	Cody Coughlin						13					57
47	Brian Campbell								11			56
48	Jordan Lawrence	DNQ	16									56
49	Chris Shannon									6		55
50	James Lynch	DNQ			8							54
51	Eddie MacDonald					6						53
52	Hunter Wright	31									23	50
53	Michael Goddard	30	25									50
54	Kendrick Kreyer								9			45
55	Sean Hingorani		10									45
56	Tyler Tanner										10	43
57	Hudson Halder				16	DNS						41
58	J. P. Crabtree						11					41
59	Derek Thorn										21	39
60	John Bolen	DNQ	18									39
61	Matthew Henderson					13						39
62	Jake Francis								15			37
63	Jace Hansen		15									37
64	Dylan Stovall							15				37
65	Ridge Oien					16						36
66	Guy Fire							16				36
67	Logan Bearden									16		36
68	Josh Stade										17	35
69	Brandon Barker								17			35
70	Casey Johnson				17							35
71	Josh Nelms					17						35
72	Scott Tomasik						17					35
73	Brandon Varney							17				35
74	Michael Bilderback				18							34
75	David Liaeff							18				34
76	Nick Neri								19			33
77	Jackson Boone			19								33
78	Nicholas Naugle	19										33
79	Evan Varney							19				33
80	Jon Beech									19		33
81	Matt Tifft								20			32
82	Treyten Lapcevich	20										32
83	Michael Atwell		21									31
84	Josh Ebbert							21				31
85	Jeff Choquette	23										29
86	Brett Robinson						DNS				29	28
87	Boris Jurkovic										24	28
88	Justin Crider			24								28
89	Brad May	25										27
90	Kodie Conner			25								27
91	Haeden Plybon										26	26
92	Anthony Sergi	26										26
93	Johnny Brazier										27	25
94	Mark Day										28	24
95	Derek Griffith	28										24
96	Dave Farrington Jr.	DNQ										20
97	Johnny Sauter	DNQ										20
98	Kris Wright	32										20
99	Mitch Haver	DNQ										20
100	Steve Weaver	DNQ										20
101	Tommy Catalano	DNQ										20
102	Bob Good	DNQ										5
103	Cody Krucker	DNQ										5
104	Daniel Webster	DNQ										5
105	Danny Knoll Jr.	DNQ										5
106	Derrick Kelley	DNQ										5
Pos	Driver	NSM	FIF	HCY	MAD	MLW	AND	OWO	TOL	WIN	NSV	Points

== See also ==
- 2024 NASCAR Cup Series
- 2024 NASCAR Xfinity Series
- 2024 NASCAR Craftsman Truck Series
- 2024 ARCA Menards Series
- 2024 ARCA Menards Series East
- 2024 ARCA Menards Series West
- 2024 NASCAR Whelen Modified Tour
- 2024 NASCAR Canada Series
- 2024 NASCAR Mexico Series
- 2024 NASCAR Whelen Euro Series
- 2024 NASCAR Brasil Sprint Race
- 2024 CARS Tour
- 2024 SMART Modified Tour
