= Nolan Pope =

American racing driver

- Born: Harrisonville, Missouri, U.S.

CARS Late Model Stock Tour career
- Debut season: 2020
- Years active: 2020
- Starts: 10
- Championships: 0
- Wins: 1
- Poles: 0
- Best finish: 5th in 2020
- Statistics up to date as of November 24, 2025.

Nolan Pope (birth date unknown) is an American former professional stock car racing driver who previously competed in the CARS Tour from 2017 to 2020.

On October 25, 2020, Pope won his only CARS Late Model Stock Tour race at Florence Motor Speedway.

Pope has also competed in series such as the ASA CRA Super Series, the CRA JEGS All-Stars Tour, the INEX Summer Shootout Series, the World Series of Asphalt Stock Car Racing, and the NASCAR Weekly Series.

== Motorsports results ==
=== CARS Late Model Stock Car Tour ===
(key) (Bold – Pole position awarded by qualifying time. Italics – Pole position earned by points standings or practice time. * – Most laps led. ** – All laps led.)

CARS Late Model Stock Car Tour results
Year	Team	No.	Make	1	2	3	4	5	6	7	8	9	10	CLMSCTC	Pts	Ref
2020	Lee Faulk Racing	1	Chevy	SNM; 17	ACE; 4	HCY; 3	HCY; 19	DOM; 17	FCS; 10	LGY; 7	CCS; 9	FLO; 1	GRE; 7	5th	247	

=== CARS Super Late Model Tour ===
(key)

CARS Super Late Model Tour results
Year	Team	No.	Make	1	2	3	4	5	6	7	8	9	10	11	12	13	CSLMTC	Pts	Ref
2017	James Pope	34	Chevy	CON; 12	DOM; 5	DOM; 3	HCY; 6	HCY; 11	BRI; 24	AND; 15	ROU; 7	TCM; 9	ROU; 11	HCY; 11	CON; 6	SBO; 13	4th	296	
2018	Nolan Pope	34	Chevy	MYB	NSH	ROU	HCY	BRI	AND	HCY; 7	ROU						21st	54	
2018	James Pope	34	Chevy									SBO; 5					21st	54	
2019	James Pope	34	Chevy	SNM; 18	HCY; 15	NSH; 15	MMS; 13	BRI; 8	HCY; 10	ROU; 7	SBO; 4						3rd	174	
2020	Lee Faulk Racing	1	N/A	SNM	HCY; 6	JEN	HCY	FCS	BRI	FLC	NSH						23rd	27	
