= 2023 ASA STARS National Tour =

1st season of the ASA STARS National Tour

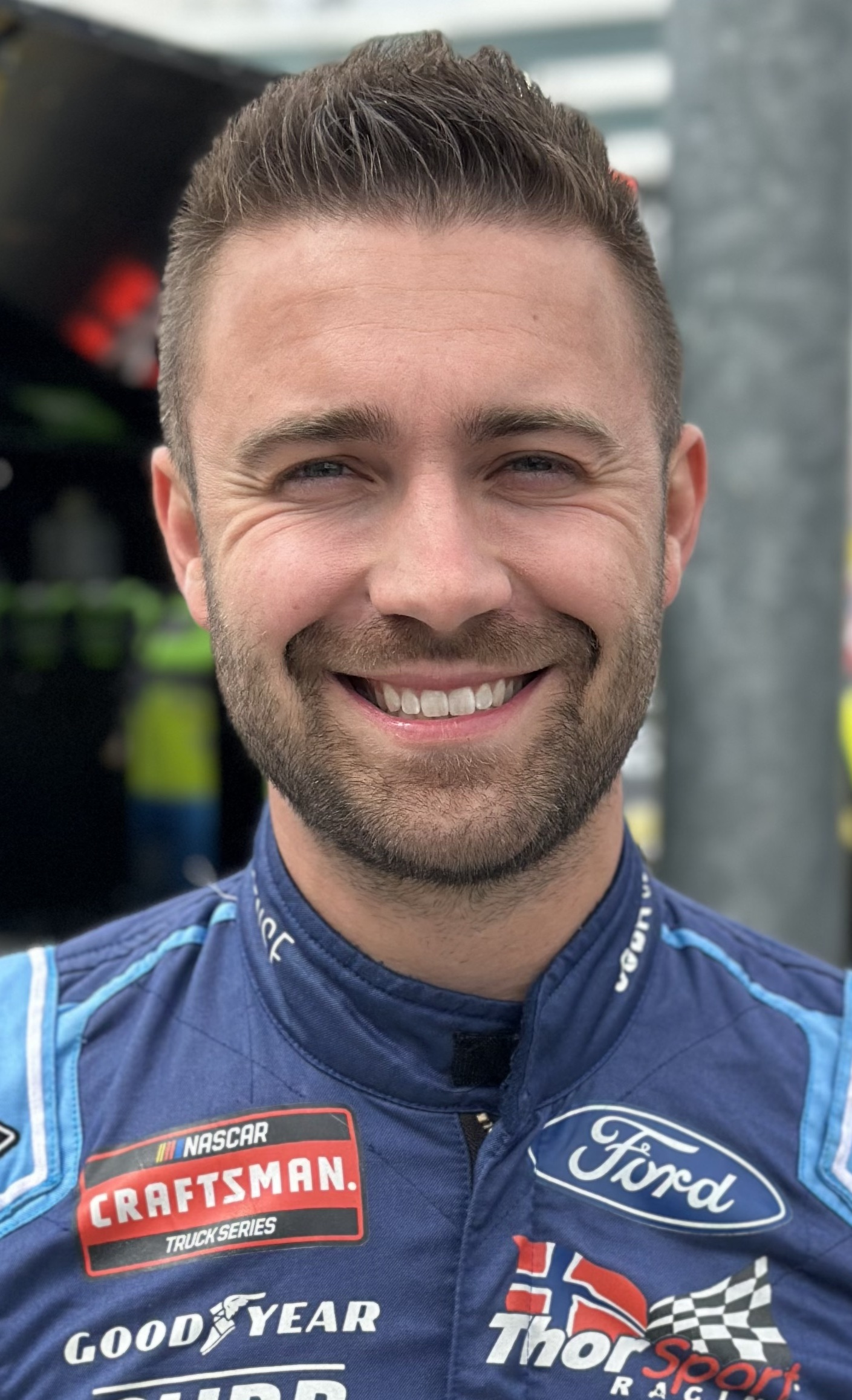
Ty Majeski, the 2023 ASA STARS National Tour champion

The 2023 ASA STARS National Tour was the inaugural season of the ASA STARS National Tour, a stock car racing series, after racing promoter Track Enterprises announced that the American Speed Association would make a return to sanction the series under a licensing agreement with ARCA. It began at Five Flags Speedway with the Sunshine State 200 on March 11, and ended at Nashville Fairgrounds Speedway with the All American 400 on November 5.

At seasons end, Ty Majeski went on to win the championship.

== Schedule ==
No.	Race title	Track	Date
1	Sunshine State 200	Five Flags Speedway, Pensacola, Florida	March 11
2	Joe Shear Classic 200	Madison International Speedway, Oregon, Wisconsin	May 7
3	EMCD 150	North Wilkesboro Speedway, North Wilkesboro, North Carolina	May 17
4	Tar Heel 250	Hickory Motor Speedway, Hickory, North Carolina	May 25
5	Father's Day 100	Milwaukee Mile, West Allis, Wisconsin	June 18
6	Redbud 400	Anderson Speedway, Anderson, Indiana	July 15
7	Gandrud Auto Group 250	Wisconsin International Raceway, Kaukauna, Wisconsin	August 1
8	Glass City 200	Toledo Speedway, Toledo, Ohio	September 14
9	Winchester 400	Winchester Speedway, Winchester, Indiana	October 13
10	All American 400	Nashville Fairgrounds Speedway, Nashville, Tennessee	November 3

== Results and standings ==
=== Races ===
No.	Race	Fastest qualifier	Most laps led	Winning driver
1	Sunshine State 200	Derek Thorn	Matt Craig	Casey Roderick
2	Joe Shear Classic 200	Paul Shafer Jr.	Ty Majeski	Ty Majeski
3	EMCD 150	Daniel Suárez	Bubba Pollard	Bubba Pollard
4	Tar Heel 250	Matt Craig	William Byron	Gio Ruggiero
5	Father's Day 100	Ty Majeski	Ty Majeski	Ty Majeski
6	Redbud 400	Cole Butcher	Ty Majeski	Cole Butcher
7	Gandrud Auto Group 250	Luke Fenhaus	Ty Majeski	Ty Majeski
8	Glass City 200	Cole Butcher	Cole Butcher	Jesse Love
9	Winchester 400	Ty Majeski	Cole Butcher	Gio Ruggiero
10	All American 400	Willie Allen	Matt Craig	William Sawalich

=== Drivers' championship ===
(key) Bold - Pole position awarded by time. Italics - Pole position set by final practice results or rainout. * – Most laps led.

Pos	Driver	FIF	MAD	NWS	HCY	MLW	AND	WIR	TOL	WIN	NSV	Points
1	Ty Majeski	3	1*	10	4	**1***	3*	1*	13	**21**	11	700
2	Cole Butcher	4	14	8	3	2	**1**	8	**2***	2*	22	668
3	Gio Ruggiero	15	6	29	1	6	2	6	9	1	26	573
4	Bubba Pollard	19	2	1*	23	8	14	7	4		23	495
5	Austin Nason	7	15	14	8	13	8	10	6	8	4	488
6	Billy VanMeter	14	DNQ	27	14	10	7	9	7	17	8	398
7	Albert Francis	17	7	22	16	21	11	18	12	16	20	375
8	Casey Roderick	1	4	7	12	3						342
9	Stephen Nasse	28	DNQ	17	7		6			3	25	265
10	William Sawalich			12		5				4	1	252
11	Gabe Sommers	6	3			7		4				249
12	Michael Hinde	11		15	10		13			20	16	233
13	Derek Kraus	21	9	32		9		3				227
14	Matt Craig	10*		11	**15**						29*	216
15	Jake Finch	16		19	24					9	7	206
16	Carson Hocevar	5		18	21	4						199
17	Chase Burda						10		3	7	28	198
18	Logan Bearden						17		10	6	9	179
19	William Byron			2	2*							173
20	Dakoda Stroup	22	DNQ	DNQ			12			5		173
21	Luke Fenhaus		26			17		**2**			18	173
22	Derek Thorn	**23**		9							2	158
23	Jesse Love				11				1			155
24	Jett Noland	26	20	13	9							150
25	Jonathan Eilen		10			11		15				140
26	Jeremy Doss	2		16							24	133
27	Chase Elliott			3	6							132
28	Kyle Crump		DNQ				4		14			131
29	Levon Van Der Geest		5			14		19				125
30	Bryan Syer-Keske		12			12		11				122
31	Justin Mondeik		11			23		13				121
32	Noah Gragson			30					11	15		119
33	Dustin Smith	33		DNQ	17						6	115
34	Jacob Goede		8								10	111
35	Caden Kvapil			6	5							109
36	Blaine Rocha	13		20	20							103
37	Barrett Polhemus		DNQ			15		5				103
38	John De Angelis Jr.		19					14				101
39	Dalton Armstrong						5			19		100
40	Jake Garcia									11	19	99
41	Andrik Dimayuga								5	13		96
42	Dan Fredrickson	12	DSQ			25						92
43	Paul Shafer Jr.		**22**					12				91
44	Sammy Smith			4				21				90
45	Scott Tomasik						16		8			89
46	Johnny Sauter		21	DNQ				25			33	84
47	Jacob Gomes	8	16									83
48	Blake Rowe						9		DNS	18		82
49	Harley Jankowski		DNQ			18		16				79
50	Brandon Varney								15	14		77
51	John Bolen	9		24								73
52	Daniel Suárez			5								70
53	Bobby Kendall		17					22				70
54	Michael Bilderback	29	18	DNQ								67
55	Tony Elrod	27	DNQ	DNQ	25							65
56	Jackson Boone				19						31	65
57	Joseph Scholze		DNQ			24		24				64
58	Willie Allen										**5**	63
59	R. J. Braun		23					20				61
60	Michael House										3	61
61	Jeff Storm		24			22						58
62	Hunter Robbins	18		DNQ								55
63	Preston Peltier	20										52
64	Ross Strmiska			DNQ	13							52
65	Grant Enfinger	31		23								50
66	Steve Apel		13									46
67	Tyler Tanner			DNS	18							44
68	Kodie Conner			DNQ	22							42
69	Jordan Miller									10		41
70	Jaden Cretacci									12		40
71	T. J. Duke										12	40
72	Josh Hicks										13	39
73	John Aramendia										14	38
74	Jaren Crabtree						15					37
75	Tommy Joe Martins										15	37
76	Ryan Farrell					16						36
77	Michael Simko								16			36
78	Ryan Moore	25		DNQ								35
79	Andy Monday							17				35
80	Brian Campbell								17			35
81	Hunter Wright										17	35
82	Cassten Everidge						18					34
83	David Liaeff								18			34
84	Sean Hingorani					19						33
85	Jordan Riddick										27	33
86	Steve Seligman					20						32
87	Hudson Halder			21								31
88	Ty Fredrickson										21	31
89	Chris Munson									22		30
90	Trevor Vandermelon							23				29
91	Jon Beach									23		29
92	Timothy Watson	24										28
93	Evan Varney									24		28
94	Andrew Morrissey		25									27
95	Derek Griffith			25								27
96	Anthony Sergi			26								26
97	Pete Vandermelon							26				26
98	Jordan DeVoy		27									25
99	James Swanson							27				25
100	Justin Crider			28								24
101	Connor Okrzesik	30										22
102	Conner Jones			31								22
103	Johnny Brazier										30	22
104	Allen Karnes										32	20
105	Ryan Luza	34										18
106	Kyle Bryant	35										17
107	Augie Grill			DNQ								15
108	Billy Mohn		DNQ									14
109	Dylan Caldwell			DNQ								12
110	Mason Diaz			DNQ								11
111	J. P. Crabtree						DNS			DNS		10
112	Joe Vinachi		DNQ									8
113	Boris Jurkovic	32										5
114	Clint Folsom	DNS										5
115	Rich Clouser			DNQ								5
116	Erik Jones			DNQ								5
117	Dusty Williams			DNQ								5
118	Chandler Smith			DNQ								5
119	Dylan Garner			DNQ								5
120	Harrison Halder			DNQ								5
121	John Coffman			DNQ								5
Pos	Driver	FIF	MAD	NWS	HCY	MLW	AND	WIR	TOL	WIN	NSV	Points

== See also ==
- 2023 NASCAR Cup Series
- 2023 NASCAR Xfinity Series
- 2023 NASCAR Craftsman Truck Series
- 2023 ARCA Menards Series
- 2023 ARCA Menards Series East
- 2023 ARCA Menards Series West
- 2023 NASCAR Whelen Modified Tour
- 2023 NASCAR Pinty's Series
- 2023 NASCAR Mexico Series
- 2023 NASCAR Whelen Euro Series
- 2023 NASCAR Brasil Sprint Race
- 2023 SRX Series
- 2023 CARS Tour
- 2023 SMART Modified Tour
