= 2020 CARS Tour =

24th season of the CARS Tour

The 2020 CARS Tour was the 24th season of the Solid Rock Carriers CARS Tour, a stock car racing series. It began at Southern National Motorsports Park on March 7 and ended at Nashville Fairgrounds Speedway on November 1. Jared Fryar won the Late Model Stock Tour championship, while Matt Craig won the Super Late Model Tour championship.

Bobby McCarty entered the season as the defending Late Model Stock Tour champion, while Matt Craig entered as the defending Super Late Model Tour champion.

== Schedule & results ==
Date	Track	Location	LMSC Winner	SLM Winner
March 7	Southern National Motorsports Park	Kenly, North Carolina	Taylor Gray	Matt Craig
June 6	Ace Speedway	Altamahaw, North Carolina	Ryan Millington	N/A
June 13	Hickory Motor Speedway	Hickory, North Carolina	Corey Heim	Bubba Pollard
July 4	Jennerstown Speedway	Jennerstown, Pennsylvania	N/A	Bubba Pollard
August 1	Hickory Motor Speedway	Hickory, North Carolina	Bobby McCarty	Matt Craig
August 8	Dominion Raceway	Thornburg, Virginia	Jonathan Findley	N/A
August 22	Franklin County Speedway	Callaway, Virginia	Jared Fryar	Bubba Pollard
August 29	Langley Speedway	Hampton, Virginia	Layne Riggs	N/A
September 12	Carteret County Speedway	Swansboro, North Carolina	Layne Riggs	N/A
September 26	Bristol Motor Speedway	Bristol, Tennessee	N/A	Trevor Noles
October 3	Florence Motor Speedway	Timmonsville, South Carolina	Nolan Pope	Matt Craig
October 25	Greenville-Pickens Speedway	Greenville, South Carolina	Josh Berry	N/A
November 1	Nashville Fairgrounds Speedway	Nashville, Tennessee	N/A	Casey Roderick

== Standings ==
=== Late Model Stock Car championship ===
(key) Bold – Pole position awarded by time. Italics – Pole position set by final practice results or rainout. * – Most laps led.

Pos	Driver	SNM	ACE	HCY	HCY	DOM	FCS	LGY	CCS	FLO	GRE	Points
1	Jared Fryar	13	3	4	2	6	1	3	3	5	13	280
2	Layne Riggs	5	2	5	22	5	7	1	**1****	**15**	3	279
3	Corey Heim	15	8	**1***	8	15	5	**2***	2	6	2	275
4	Bobby McCarty	10	**18***	7	1**	11	4	6	5	13	6	256
5	Nolan Pope	17	4	3	10	17	10	7	9	1	7	247
6	Connor Mosack	3	11	10	7	8	3	8	4	21	10	245
7	Jonathan Findley	8	24	19	17	1	11	9	15	10	5	213
8	Chad McCumbee	19	25	14	5	13	12	10	13	3	8	210
9	Jonathan Shafer	9	14	20	9	**4***	8	11	16	16		193
10	Brandon Pierce	16	9	8	12	3	19	17	7		17	189
11	Justin Johnson	11	22	13	20	7	14	14	14	19	12	185
12	Mini Tyrrell	24	26	25	**3**	2	17	4	12	8	29	181
13	Matt Cox	12	15	22	11	9	16	13	20	17	22	174
14	Ronald Hill	7	21	18	19	19	13	16	6	12	28	171
15	Deac McCaskill	**2**	27	12	14		6			7	4	161
16	Jessica Cann		17	21	18	10	18	21	8	14	20	150
17	Tyler Matthews	18	20	17	23	16	22	18	22	11	16	147
18	Trevor Ward	21	13	15	4				17			95
19	Gage Painter	22	12	2	16							80
20	Blake Stallings		7		13			5				74
21	Craig Moore	14		6	24	18						71
22	Josh Berry	4	DSQ								**1***	65
23	Stacy Puryear						9	15	10			65
24	Sammy Smith		5			14			19			61
25	Timothy Peters							22		2*	19	58
26	Mike Looney						**2***				11	57
27	Taylor Gray	1*	16									52
28	Sam Butler			11	6							49
29	Camden Gullie		10					20	21			48
30	Ryan Millington		1	23								44
31	Justin Carroll		6		21							39
32	Mike Darne	6	DNQ								23	39
33	Austin Somero									20	9	37
34	Chris Chapman	20								9		37
35	Adam Lemke		19	16								31
36	Grayson Cullather					12		23				31
37	Travis Truett								18	18		30
38	Lee Pulliam									4		29
39	Drew Dollar			9								24
40	Brandon Clements								11			22
41	Trey Crews							12				21
42	Cameron Bolin										14	19
43	Kyle Dudley						15					18
44	Taylor Satterfield										15	18
45	William Cox III				15							18
46	Ralph Carnes										18	15
47	Terry Carroll							19				14
48	Chris Carroll						20					13
49	Logan Jones					20						13
50	Ricky Gillespie						21					12
51	Trey Gibson										21	12
52	Bubba Pollard		23									10
53	Chris Burns								23			10
54	Peyton Sellers										24	10
55	Tommy Lemons Jr.	23										10
56	Dillon Houser			24								9
57	Justin S. Carroll							24				9
58	Riley Gentry										25	8
59	Janson Marchbanks										26	7
60	Ross Dalton										27	6
61	Jackie Manley										30	3
62	Anthony Anders										DNQ	2
63	Jake Crum		DNQ									2
64	Jeremy Burns										DNQ	2
Pos	Driver	SNM	ACE	HCY	HCY	DOM	FCS	LGY	CCS	FLO	GRE	Points

=== Super Late Model Tour championship ===
(key) Bold – Pole position awarded by time. Italics – Pole position set by final practice results or rainout. * – Most laps led.

Pos	Driver	SNM	HCY	JEN	HCY	FCS	BRI	FLC	NSH	Points
1	Matt Craig	1*	3*	8	1*	5	12	1*	10	235
2	Kodie Conner	6	5	15	2	7	9	4	**8**	210
3	Sammy Smith	12	7	2	6	2*	**7**	3	20	207
4	Trevor Noles	**2**	**8**	**23**	**3**	10	1	**2**		192
5	Carson Kvapil	5	4	12	4	6		9	27	164
6	Jeff Batten	11	13	16	7	9	21	7		147
7	Jake Garcia		9	3		4	5*		6	140
8	Justin Crider		14	21	8	8	8	5		134
9	Bubba Pollard	14	1	1*		**1**			24	132
10	Stephen Nasse	3		18			3		3	105
11	Tyler Church		16		5			6		72
12	Hudson Halder	8	12	13					34	68
13	Corey Heim			6			19		18	57
14	Mike Hopkins	7		7						52
15	Kris Wright				11			8		47
16	Michael Ritch				13			11		43
17	T. J. Duke				9		18			39
18	Jeremy Barclay	15	15							36
19	Chandler Smith		2						2	31
20	Gus Dean					3				30
21	Tate Fogleman			4						30
22	Travis Braden	4								29
23	Nolan Pope		6							27
24	Mike Speeney	9								24
25	Austin MacDonald	10								23
26	Cole Timm							10		23
27	Mamba Smith				10					23
28	Jake Crum		10							23
29	Harrison Halder		11							22
30	Jeff Fultz				12					22
31	Gabe Sommers	13							13	20
32	Tovia Grynewicz			17						16
33	Greg Van Alst			20			2		23	
34	Albert Francis			10					29	
35	Austin Nason						16		5	
36	Cody Coughlin			DNS			14			
37	Connor Okrzesik						11		9	
38	Daniel Dye						4		25	
39	Jeremy Pate						8		16	
40	Josh Brock			9			13			
41	Logan Runyon			14			6			
42	Michael Simko			19			15			
43	Boris Jurkovic								31	
44	Brandon Oakley								17	
45	Brittney Zamora								11	
46	Carson Hocevar								21	
47	Casey Roderick								1	
48	Chris Davidson			5						
49	Cody Dempster								14	
50	Derek Thorn								22*	
51	Donnie Wilson								4	
52	Hunter Robbins						DNS		12	
53	Jeff Storm								30	
54	Jett Noland								33	
55	John Coffman						17			
56	Johnny Brazier								32	
57	Josh Todd						20			
58	Kyle Crump			22						
59	Kyle Neveau								15	
60	Kyle Plott			11						
61	Mason Keller								26	
62	Trevor McCoy								28	
63	Trevor Cristiani								19	
64	Willie Allen								7	
65	Alex Prunty						DNS			
Pos	Driver	SNM	HCY	JEN	HCY	FCS	BRI	FLC	NSH	Points

== See also ==
- 2020 NASCAR Cup Series
- 2020 NASCAR Xfinity Series
- 2020 NASCAR Gander RV & Outdoors Truck Series
- 2020 ARCA Menards Series
- 2020 ARCA Menards Series East
- 2020 ARCA Menards Series West
- 2020 NASCAR Whelen Modified Tour
- 2020 NASCAR Pinty's Series
- 2020 NASCAR Whelen Euro Series
- eNASCAR iRacing Pro Invitational Series
- 2020 EuroNASCAR Esports Series
