= Jared Fryar =

American racing driver

- Born: March 10, 1994 (age 32) Trinity, North Carolina, U.S.

CARS Late Model Stock Tour career
- Debut season: 2017
- Years active: 2017, 2019–present
- Starts: 64
- Championships: 0
- Wins: 7
- Poles: 1
- Best finish: 1st in 2020

Championship titles
- 2020
- Statistics up to date as of October 18, 2026.

Jared Fryar (born March 10, 1994) is an American professional stock car racing driver. He currently competes in the zMAX CARS Tour, driving the No. 14 Dodge for JM Racing, and the No. 22 Toyota for Nelson Motorsports. He is a longtime competitor and former champion of the series, having previously won the Late Model Stock championship in 2020, and having won the former Super Late Model Tour championship in 2018. As of 2025, he has also won seven races in the Late Model Stock Tour.

Fryar is the grandson of the late Freddy Fryar, who competed part-time in the NASCAR Winston Cup Series, and won the Snowball Derby in 1979 and 1981.

Before the 2026 season, Fryar competed in Kaulig Racing's "Race For the Seat", competing against 14 other drivers to try to win a full-season ride in the teams No. 14 truck.

Fryar has also competed in series such as the NASCAR Whelen Modified Tour, the SMART Modified Tour, the Virginia Late Model Triple Crown Series, the ASA CRA Super Series, and the NASCAR Weekly Series.

== Motorsports results ==
=== NASCAR ===
(key) (Bold – Pole position awarded by qualifying time. Italics – Pole position earned by points standings or practice time. * – Most laps led.)

==== Whelen Modified Tour ====
NASCAR Whelen Modified Tour results
Year	Car owner	No.	Make	1	2	3	4	5	6	7	8	9	10	11	12	13	14	NWMTC	Pts	Ref
2021	Brother-In-Law Racing	57	Chevy	MAR; 16	STA	RIV	JEN	OSW	RIV	NHA	NRP	STA	BEE	OSW	RCH	RIV	STA	58th	28	

=== CARS Late Model Stock Car Tour ===
(key) (Bold – Pole position awarded by qualifying time. Italics – Pole position earned by points standings or practice time. * – Most laps led. ** – All laps led.)

CARS Late Model Stock Car Tour results
Year	Team	No.	Make	1	2	3	4	5	6	7	8	9	10	11	12	13	14	15	16	17	CLMSCTC	Pts	Ref
2017	Larry Coleman	81F	Chevy	CON	DOM; 5	DOM; 1															8th	249	
2017	Larry Coleman	81	Ford				HCY; 10	HCY; 21	BRI; 2	AND; 5			ROU; 4		CON; 16	SBO; 23					8th	249	
2017	Larry Coleman	81F	Ford								ROU; 6	TCM									8th	249	
2017	Larry Coleman	44	Ford											HCY; 13							8th	249	
2019	JM Racing	17F	Chevy	SNM	HCY	ROU	ACE	MMS	LGY	DOM	CCS	HCY	ROU	SBO; 14							51st	19	
2020	JM Racing	14	Ford	SNM; 13	ACE; 3	HCY; 4	HCY; 2	DOM; 6	FCS; 1	LGY; 3	CCS; 3	FLO; 5	GRE; 13								1st	280	
2021	JM Racing	14	Ford	DIL; 4	HCY; 11	OCS; 4	ACE; 4	CRW; 13	LGY; 5	DOM; 4	HCY; 5	MMS; 11	TCM; 5	FLC; 7	WKS; 4	SBO; 8					3rd	344	
2022	JM Racing	14	Ford	CRW; 3	HCY	GRE; 2	AAS	FCS	LGY	DOM; 18	HCY	ACE; 6	MMS	NWS; 14	TCM	ACE; 8	SBO	CRW; 1			19th	182	
2023	JM Racing	14	Ford	SNM; 12	FLC; 12	HCY	ACE				CRW; 1	HCY	ACE	TCM; 6	WKS	AAS	SBO	TCM	CRW; 4		21st	161	
2023	JM Racing	14	Chevy					NWS; 3	LGY	DOM											21st	161	
2024	JM Racing	14	Ford	SNM	HCY	AAS	OCS	ACE	TCM	LGY	DOM	**CRW**; 4	HCY	NWS	ACE	WCS	FLC	SBO	TCM; 2	NWS	N/A	0	
2025	JM Racing	14	Ford	AAS; 29	WCS	CDL	OCS; 1	ACE	NWS	LGY; 2	DOM	CRW; 1	HCY; 2	AND; 3*	FLC	SBO	TCM; 1	NWS			17th	271	
2026	JM Racing	14	Dodge	SNM; 6	WCS; 20	NSV; 24	CRW; 6	ACE	LGY; Wth												16th	221	
2026	Nelson Motorsports	22	Toyota							DOM; 19	NWS	HCY	AND; 26	FLC							16th	221	
2026	Nelson Motorsports	22F	Toyota												TCM; 8	NPS					16th	221	
2026	Nelson Motorsports	12	Toyota														SBO; 7				16th	221	

=== CARS Super Late Model Tour ===
(key)

CARS Super Late Model Tour results
Year	Team	No.	Make	1	2	3	4	5	6	7	8	9	10	11	12	13	CSLMTC	Pts	Ref
2016	Marc Fryar	14	N/A	SNM	ROU	HCY	TCM	GRE	ROU	CON	MYB	HCY	SNM; 10				48th	23	
2017	Brandin Wrisley	14F	Chevy	CON	DOM	DOM	HCY	HCY	BRI	AND	ROU	TCM	ROU	HCY	CON	SBO; 8	38th	26	
2018	Brandin Wrisley	14F	Chevy	MYB; 8	NSH; 9	ROU; 3		**BRI**; 7									1st	232	
2018	Brandin Wrisley	14	Chevy				HCY; 3		AND; 14		ROU; 4	SBO; 12					1st	232	
2018	Brandin Wrisley	48	Chevy							HCY; 5							1st	232	
2019	Brandin Wrisley	14	Chevy	SNM; 4	HCY; 5		MMS; 9		HCY; 6	ROU; 6	SBO; 5						2nd	211	
2019	Brandin Wrisley	14F	Chevy			NSH; 5		BRI; 13									2nd	211	

=== SMART Modified Tour ===
SMART Modified Tour results
Year	Car owner	No.	Make	1	2	3	4	5	6	7	8	9	10	11	12	SMTC	Pts	Ref
2021	N/A	44NC	N/A	CRW; 7	FLO	SBO	FCS	CRW	DIL	CAR	CRW	DOM	PUL	HCY	ACE	36th	24	
