= Justin Johnson (racing driver, born 1987) =

American racing driver (born 1987)

- Born: March 3, 1987 (age 39) Roxboro, North Carolina, U.S.

CARS Late Model Stock Tour career
- Debut season: 2015
- Years active: 2015–2018, 2020–2022
- Starts: 46
- Championships: 0
- Wins: 2
- Poles: 1
- Best finish: 4th in 2021
- Statistics up to date as of October 22, 2025.

Justin Johnson (born March 3, 1987) is an American professional stock car racing driver and team owner who previously competed in the CARS Tour from 2015 to 2022, where he earned two wins and one pole position, all coming in 2021. He is also the owner of Justin Johnson Racing, which competes in Late Model racing.

Johnson has also competed in series such as the Virginia Late Model Triple Crown Series, the Dirty Dozen Series, the Southeast Limited Late Model Series, and the NASCAR Weekly Series.

== Motorsports results ==
=== CARS Late Model Stock Car Tour ===
(key) (Bold – Pole position awarded by qualifying time. Italics – Pole position earned by points standings or practice time. * – Most laps led. ** – All laps led.)

CARS Late Model Stock Car Tour results
Year	Team	No.	Make	1	2	3	4	5	6	7	8	9	10	11	12	13	14	15	CLMSCTC	Pts	Ref
2015	Justin Johnson Racing	44	Chevy	SNM; 27	ROU; 7	HCY	SNM	TCM	MMS	ROU	CON	MYB	HCY						38th	32	
2016	Justin Johnson Racing	44	Chevy	SNM; 9	ROU; 8	HCY	TCM	GRE	ROU	CON	MYB	HCY	SNM						23rd	49	
2017	Tommy Lemons	44	Chevy	CON; 4	DOM; 7	DOM; 5	HCY; 20	HCY; 5	BRI; 26	AND; 3	ROU; 11	TCM; 10	ROU; 13						9th	241	
2017	Tommy Lemons	82	Chevy											HCY; 17	CON	SBO			9th	241	
2018	Robert Tyler	44	Ford	TCM; 22	MYB; 3	ROU; 11	HCY	BRI	ACE	CCS	KPT	HCY	WKS						18th	82	
2018	Robert Tyler	57	Ford											ROU; 15	SBO				18th	82	
2020	John Carroll	44	Chevy	SNM; 11	ACE; 22														11th	185	
2020	John Carroll	44	Ford			HCY; 13													11th	185	
2020	Justin Johnson Racing	44	Chevy				HCY; 20												11th	185	
2020	Boyce McCaskill	08	Chevy					DOM; 7	FCS; 14	LGY; 14	CCS; 14	FLO; 19	GRE; 12						11th	185	
2021	Justin Johnson Racing	44	Ford	DIL; 1	HCY; 10	**OCS**; 25	ACE; 3	CRW; 1	LGY; 2	DOM; 5		MMS; 2	TCM; 7	FLC; 3	WKS; 13	SBO; 14			4th	337	
2021	Justin Johnson Racing	8J	Ford								HCY; 13								4th	337	
2022	Justin Johnson Racing	4	Ford	CRW; 25	HCY; 14	GRE; 17	AAS; 17	FCS	LGY	DOM	HCY	ACE	MMS	NWS	TCM	ACE	SBO	CRW	33rd	63	
