= Matt Craig (racing driver) =

American racing driver

- Born: February 9, 1999 (age 27) Kannapolis, North Carolina, U.S.

CARS Pro Late Model Tour career
- Debut season: 2022
- Years active: 2022–2024
- Starts: 4
- Championships: 0
- Wins: 0
- Poles: 0
- Best finish: 34th in 2022
- Statistics up to date as of November 24, 2025.

Matthew Craig (born February 9, 1999) is an American professional stock car racing driver who competes in the zMAX CARS Tour and the ASA STARS National Tour.

Craig is a former champion of the now-defunct Super Late Model Tour, having won it in 2019 and 2020. During his time in the series, he won nine races between 2015 and 2021 in the SLM category (one in 2016, two in 2017, two in 2019, three in 2020, and one in 2021), as well as five pole positions.

Craig has also competed in series such as the PASS South Super Late Model Series, where he won three consecutive championships from 2016 to 2018, the CRA JEGS All-Stars Tour, the ASA Southern Super Series, and the NASCAR Weekly Series, and is a former winner of the All American 400 at Nashville Fairgrounds Speedway, having previously won it in 2021.

== Motorsports results ==
=== Stock car career summary ===
Season	Series	Team	Races	Wins	Top 5	Top 10	Points	Position
2015	CARS Super Late Model Tour	Jeff Craig	8	0	0	0	115	17th
2016	CARS Super Late Model Tour	Jeff Craig	9	1	5	7	244	**3rd**
2017	CARS Super Late Model Tour	Jeff Craig	10	2	8	10	313	**3rd**
2018	CARS Super Late Model Tour	Jeff Craig	6	0	1	4	141	7th
2019	CARS Super Late Model Tour	Jeff Craig	8	2	6	8	253	**1st**
2020	CARS Super Late Model Tour	Jeff Craig	8	3	5	7	235	**1st**
2021	CARS Super Late Model Tour	Jeff Craig	8	1	8	8	252	**2nd**
2022	CARS Pro Late Model Tour	JCR-3 Racing	1	0	1	1	30	34th
2023	ASA STARS National Tour	Matt Craig	4	0	0	1	216	14th
2023	CARS Pro Late Model Tour	JCR-3 Racing	2	0	1	1	32	40th
2024	ASA STARS National Tour	Matt Craig	4	0	2	3	231	14th
2024	CARS Pro Late Model Tour	JCR-3 Racing	1	0	1	1	0	N/A
2025	ASA STARS National Tour	Matt Craig	6	0	1	2	345	14th
2026	ASA STARS National Tour	Matt Craig	6	0	2	3		
2026	CARS Late Model Stock Car Tour	R&S Race Cars	1	0	0	0	22	77th

=== CARS Late Model Stock Car Tour ===
(key) (Bold – Pole position awarded by qualifying time. Italics – Pole position earned by points standings or practice time. * – Most laps led. ** – All laps led.)

CARS Late Model Stock Car Tour results
Year	Team	No.	Make	1	2	3	4	5	6	7	8	9	10	11	12	13	14	CLMSCTC	Pts	Ref
2026	R&S Race Cars	10	Dodge	SNM	WCS	NSV; 20	CRW	ACE	LGY	DOM	NWS	HCY	AND	FLC	TCM	NPS	SBO	77th	22	

=== CARS Super Late Model Tour ===
(key)

CARS Super Late Model Tour results
Year	Team	No.	Make	1	2	3	4	5	6	7	8	9	10	11	12	13	CSLMTC	Pts	Ref
2015	Jeff Craig	54	Chevy	SNM; 21	ROU; 29	HCY	SNM; 26	TCM; 15	MMS; 11	ROU	CON; 16	MYB; 12	HCY; 27				17th	115	
2016	Jeff Craig	54	Chevy	SNM; 5	ROU	HCY; 10	TCM; 3	**GRE**; 1*	ROU; 13	CON; 4	MYB; 4	HCY; 14	SNM; 7				3rd	244	
2017	Jeff Craig	54	Chevy	CON; 4*	DOM	DOM	HCY; 1	HCY; 6	BRI	**AND**; 6	**ROU**; 3*	**TCM**; 1*	ROU; 2	**HCY**; 2*	CON; 5	SBO; 2	3rd	313	
2018	Jeff Craig	54	Chevy	MYB; 10	NSH	ROU; 8	HCY; 15	BRI	AND; 5		ROU; 13	SBO					7th	141	
2018	Jeff Craig	63	Chevy							HCY; 6							7th	141	
2019	Jeff Craig	54	Chevy	SNM; 8	HCY; 3	NSH; 3	**MMS**; 2*	BRI; 6		**ROU**; 2*	SBO; 1**						1st	253	
2019	Jeff Craig	74	Chevy						**HCY**; 1*								1st	253	
2020	Jeff Craig	54	Chevy	SNM; 1**	HCY; 3*	JEN; 8	HCY; 1*	FCS; 5	BRI; 12	FLC; 1*							1st	235	
2020	Jeff Craig	54	Toyota								NSH; 10						1st	235	
2021	Jeff Craig	54	Chevy	HCY; 2*	GPS; 4	NSH; 2	JEN; 3	**HCY**; 1*	MMS; 3	TCM; 3	SBO; 3						2nd	252	

=== CARS Pro Late Model Tour ===
(key)

CARS Pro Late Model Tour results
Year	Team	No.	Make	1	2	3	4	5	6	7	8	9	10	11	12	13	CPLMTC	Pts	Ref
2022	JCR-3 Racing	54	Chevy	CRW	HCY	GPS	FCS	TCM	HCY	ACE	MMS	TCM; 3	ACE	SBO	CRW		34th	30	
2023	JCR-3 Racing	54	Chevy	SNM	HCY; 4	ACE	NWS; 31	TCM	DIL	CRW	WKS	HCY	TCM	SBO	TCM	CRW	40th	32	
2024	JCR-3 Racing	54	Chevy	SNM	HCY	OCS	ACE	TCM	CRW	HCY	NWS; 5	ACE	FLC	SBO	TCM	NWS	N/A	0	

=== ASA STARS National Tour ===
(key) (Bold – Pole position awarded by qualifying time. Italics – Pole position earned by points standings or practice time. * – Most laps led. ** – All laps led.)

ASA STARS National Tour results
Year	Team	No.	Make	1	2	3	4	5	6	7	8	9	10	11	12	ASNTC	Pts	Ref
2023	Matt Craig	54	Chevy	FIF; 10*	MAD	NWS; 11	HCY; 15	MLW	AND	WIR	TOL	WIN	NSV; 29*			14th	216	
2024	Matt Craig	54C	Chevy	NSM; 14												14th	231	
2024	Matt Craig	54	Chevy		**FIF**; 5	HCY; 4	MAD	MLW	AND	OWO	TOL	WIN	NSV; 9			14th	231	
2025	Matt Craig	54	Chevy	NSM; 17		DOM; 10	HCY; 17	NPS	MAD	SLG	AND	OWO	TOL		NSV; 13	14th	345	
2025	Matt Craig	54C	Chevy		FIF; 3											14th	345	
2025	Matt Craig	54	Toyota											WIN; 11		14th	345	
2026	Matt Craig	54	Chevy	NSM; 11	FIF; 15	HCY; 9	SLG	MAD	**NPS**; 2*	OWO	TRI; 14	WIN	NSV; 2	NSM		-*	-*	
