= Arnout Kok =

South African professional stock car racing driver

- Born: February 28, 1977 (age 49); Westville, South Africa

ARCA Menards Series career
- 5 races run over 2 years
- Best finish: 43rd (2021)
- First race: 2021 Dawn 150 (Mid-Ohio)
- Last race: 2022 Dawn 150 (Mid-Ohio)
Wins	Top tens	Poles
0	1	0
- Statistics up to date as of December 2, 2021.

Arnout Kok (born February 28, 1977) is a South African professional stock car racing driver. He last competed part-time in the ARCA Menards Series, driving the Nos. 01/10 Toyota for Fast Track Racing.

== Racing career ==
=== K&N Pro Series West ===
In 2018, Kok was initially signed to run with Obaika Racing for one race at the 2018 Star Nursery 100. While the team had promised Kok to have a race-ready car before the event, the car did not turn up to the event and eventually, the team withdrew in a press statement. While the team reportedly said that they would try and find Kok another ride to race in the series, he would never run a race in the series.

=== ARCA Menards Series ===
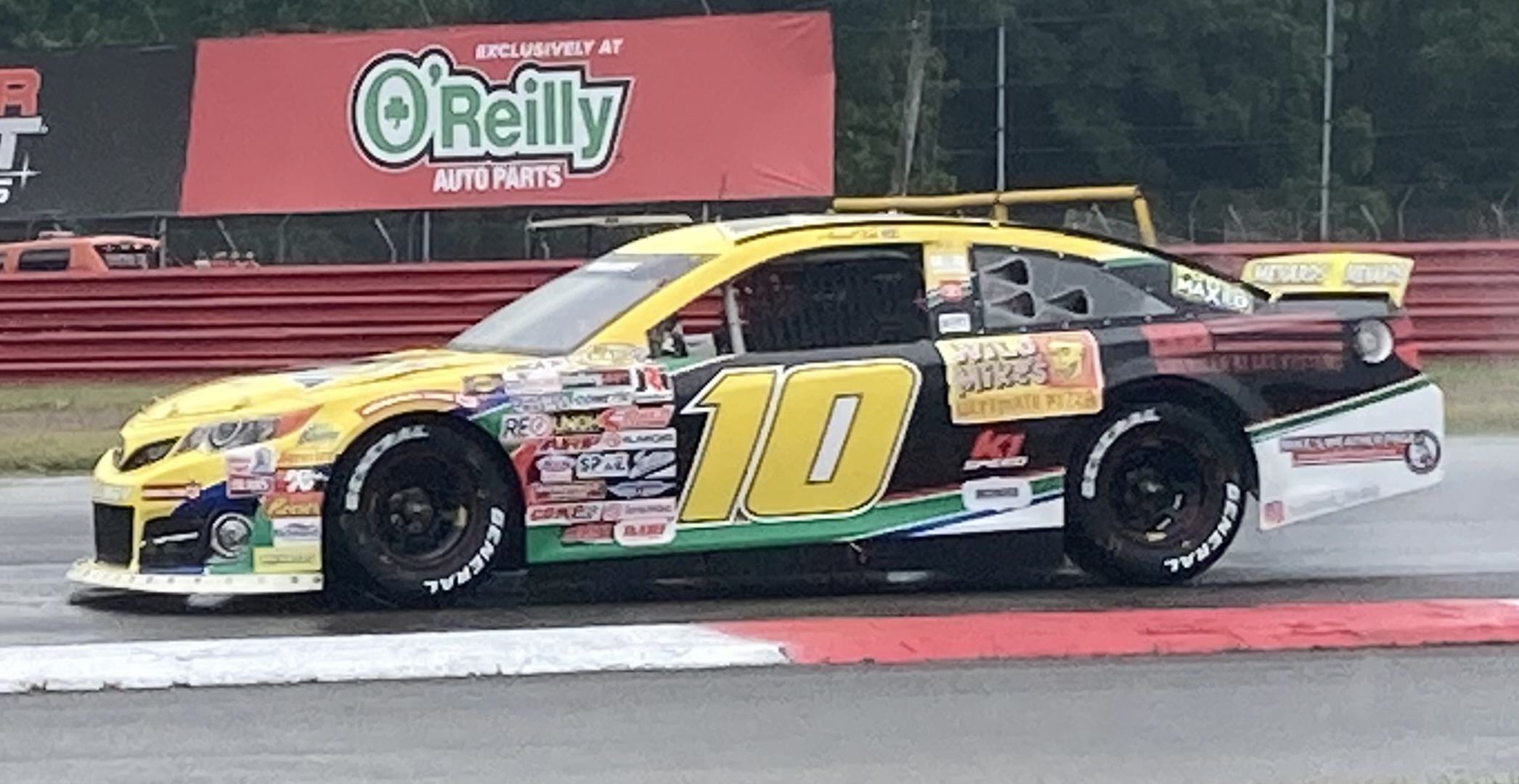
Kok at Mid-Ohio in the 2022 Dawn 150

In 2021, Kok was signed to run the 2021 Dawn 150 with Fast Track Racing, finally making his American debut after being delayed due to the COVID-19 pandemic. He would finish well, getting a top-ten in his first ever start. He would attempt three more races that year, with considerably worse results, including a "did not start" at the 2021 Sprecher 150 due to engine issues.

Kok returned to Fast Track Racing for the 2022 season on a part-time basis. He was scheduled to drive for the team in the No. 01 Toyota in the 2022 Dutch Boy 150, but did not start. He was credited in the nineteenth position. Kok returned to Mid-Ohio in 2022 once again driving Fast Track Racing’s No. 10 Toyota. He started seventeenth and finished the race in fourteenth while four laps down. This was Kok’s best and final finish in the 2022 ARCA Menards Series. He would end the season with a 59th place points finish.

== Motorsports career results ==
=== NASCAR ===
==== K&N Pro Series West ====
(key) (Bold – Pole position awarded by qualifying time. Italics – Pole position earned by points standings or practice time. * – Most laps led.)

NASCAR K&N Pro Series West results
Year	Team	No.	Make	1	2	3	4	5	6	7	8	9	10	11	12	13	14	AMSWC	Pts	Ref
2018	Obaika Racing	97	Chevy	KCR	TUS	TUS	OSS	CNS	SON	DCS	IOW	EVG	GTW	LVS; Wth	MER	AAS	KCR	N/A	0	

=== ARCA Menards Series ===
(key) (Bold – Pole position awarded by qualifying time. Italics – Pole position earned by points standings or practice time. * – Most laps led.)

ARCA Menards Series results
Year	Team	No.	Make	1	2	3	4	5	6	7	8	9	10	11	12	13	14	15	16	17	18	19	20	AMSC	Pts	Ref
2021	Fast Track Racing	10	Toyota	DAY	PHO	TAL	KAN	TOL	CLT	MOH; 9	POC	ELK	BLN	IOW	WIN	GLN; 19	MCH	ISF	MLW; 24	DSF	BRI	SLM	KAN; 20	43rd	63	
2022	Fast Track Racing	01	Toyota	DAY	PHO	TAL	KAN; 19	CLT	IOW	BLN	ELK													59th	55	
2022	Fast Track Racing	10	Toyota									MOH; 14	POC	IRP	MCH	GLN	ISF	MLW	DSF	KAN	BRI	SLM	TOL	59th	55	

==== ARCA Menards Series East ====
ARCA Menards Series East results
Year	Team	No.	Make	1	2	3	4	5	6	7	8	AMSEC	Pts	Ref
2021	Fast Track Racing	10	Toyota	NSM	FIF	NSV	DOV	SNM	IOW	MLW; 24	BRI	56th	3	
