= Brandon Varney =

American racing driver (born 1997)

- Born: July 27, 1997 (age 29) Richmond, Michigan, U.S.

ARCA Menards Series East career
- Debut season: 2022
- Current team: Ferrier-McClure Racing
- Car number: 44
- Engine: Ford
- Crew chief: Jeff McClure
- Starts: 1
- Championships: 0
- Wins: 0
- Poles: 0
- Statistics up to date as of March 24, 2022.

Brandon Varney (born July 27, 1997) is an American professional stock car racing driver. He last competed part-time in the ARCA Menards Series East, driving the No. 44 Ford Fusion for Ferrier-McClure Racing.

== Racing career ==
=== ARCA Menards Series ===
Varney made his ARCA Menards Series debut in 2021. He debuted in the Calypso Lemonade 200 at Winchester Speedway, finishing sixth. He ran one more race, the Henry Ford Health System 200 at Michigan International Speedway, finishing tenth.

=== ARCA Menards Series East ===
Varney made his ARCA Menards Series East debut in 2022 at Five Flags Speedway in the Pensacola 200. Similarly to his ARCA Menards Series debut, Varney finished sixth.

== Motorsports career results ==
=== ARCA Menards Series ===
(key) (Bold – Pole position awarded by qualifying time. Italics – Pole position earned by points standings or practice time. * – Most laps led.)

ARCA Menards Series results
Year	Team	No.	Make	1	2	3	4	5	6	7	8	9	10	11	12	13	14	15	16	17	18	19	20	AMSC	Pts	Ref
2021	Fast Track Racing	10	Toyota	DAY	PHO	TAL	KAN	TOL	CLT	MOH	POC	ELK	BLN	IOW	WIN; 6	GLN								53rd	72	
2021	Fast Track Racing	11	Toyota														MCH; 10	ISF	MLW	DSF	BRI	SLM	KAN	53rd	72	
2022	Fast Track Racing	11	Toyota	DAY	PHO	TAL	KAN	CLT	IOW	BLN	ELK	MOH	POC	IRP	MCH	GLN	ISF	MLW	DSF	KAN	BRI	SLM	TOL; 11	87th	33	

==== ARCA Menards Series East ====
ARCA Menards Series East results
Year	Team	No.	Make	1	2	3	4	5	6	7	AMSWC	Pts	Ref
2022	Ferrier-McClure Racing	44	Ford	NSM	FIF; 6	DOV	NSV	IOW	MLW	BRI	39th	38	

=== ASA STARS National Tour ===
(key) (Bold – Pole position awarded by qualifying time. Italics – Pole position earned by points standings or practice time. * – Most laps led. ** – All laps led.)

ASA STARS National Tour results
Year	Team	No.	Make	1	2	3	4	5	6	7	8	9	10	ASNTC	Pts	Ref
2023	Bob Varnay	77	Chevy	FIF	MAD	NWS	HCY	MLW	AND	WIR	TOL; 15	WIN; 14	NSV	50th	77	
2024	Bob Varnay	61	Chevy	NSM	FIF	HCY	MAD	MLW	AND	OWO; 17	TOL	WIN	NSV	73rd	35	
