= 2021 Reese's 150 =

Race details
- Race 20 of 20 of the 2021 ARCA Menards Series
- Date: October 22, 2021
- Official name: 21st Annual Reese's 150
- Location: Kansas Speedway, Kansas City, Kansas
- Course: Permanent racing facility
- Course length: 1.5 miles (2.4 km)
- Distance: 102 laps, 150 mi (246.228 km)
- Scheduled distance: 100 laps, 150 mi (241.402 km)
- Average speed: 120.482 miles per hour (193.897 km/h)

Pole position
Driver	Ty Gibbs	Joe Gibbs Racing
- Time: 30.575

Most laps led
Driver	Ty Gibbs	Joe Gibbs Racing
- Laps: 99

Winner
No. 2	Nick Sanchez	Rev Racing

Television in the United States
- Network: MAVTV
- Announcers: Bob Dillner, Jim Tretow

Radio in the United States
- Radio: MRN; SiriusXM

The 2021 Reese's 150 was the 20th and final stock car race of the 2021 ARCA Menards Series, and the 21st iteration of the event. The race was held on Saturday, October 23, 2021 in Kansas City, Kansas at Kansas Speedway, a 1.500 miles (2.414 km) permanent paved oval-shaped racetrack. The race took 102 laps to complete due to an overtime finish. On the final restart on lap 101, Nick Sanchez of Rev Racing would take the lead to win his first career ARCA Menards Series win and his only win of the season. Meanwhile, Ty Gibbs of Joe Gibbs Racing, who finished 2nd, would win the 2021 ARCA Menards Series championship after taking the green flag, who won by 37 points over Corey Heim. To fill out the podium, Rajah Caruth of Rev Racing would finish third.

== Background ==
Kansas Speedway is a 1.5-mile (2.4 km) tri-oval race track in the Village West area near Kansas City, Kansas, United States. It was built in 2001 and it currently hosts two annual NASCAR race weekends. The IndyCar Series also held races at the venue until 2011. The speedway is owned and operated by NASCAR.

=== Entry list ===
#	Driver	Team	Make	Sponsor
01	D. L. Wilson	Fast Track Racing	Chevrolet	Tradinghouse Bar & Grill
02	Connor Mosack	Young's Motorsports	Chevrolet	Nic Tailor Custom Underwear
2	Nick Sanchez (R)	Rev Racing	Chevrolet	Max Siegel Incorporated
06	Wayne Peterson	Wayne Peterson Racing	Chevrolet	Great Railing
6	Rajah Caruth	Rev Racing	Chevrolet	Max Siegel Incorporated
7	Eric Caudell	CCM Racing	Toyota	Consolidated Electrical Distributors
10	Arnout Kok	Fast Track Racing	Toyota	Brand South Africa, Power Maxed
11	Ron Vandermeir Jr.	Fast Track Racing	Ford	Mac Rak Incorporated
12	Tony Cosentino	Fast Track Racing	Toyota	Fast Track Racing
15	Drew Dollar	Venturini Motorsports	Toyota	Sunbelt Rentals
18	Ty Gibbs	Joe Gibbs Racing	Toyota	Monster Energy
20	Corey Heim	Venturini Motorsports	Toyota	JBL
25	Parker Chase	Venturini Motorsports	Toyota	NXTLVL Marine
27	Zachary Tinkle	Richmond Clubb Motorsports	Ford	Indiana Owned
28	Kyle Sieg	RSS Racing	Chevrolet	RSS Racing
30	Kris Wright	Rette Jones Racing	Ford	Wright Automotive Group
35	Greg Van Alst	Greg Van Alst Motorsports	Ford	CB Fabricating
36	Ryan Huff	Huff Racing	Ford	H&H Excavation, South Eastern Services
40	Dean Thompson	Niece Motorsports	Chevrolet	Thompson Pipe Group
46	J. P. Bergeron	David Gilliland Racing	Ford	Technoflex
48	Brad Smith	Brad Smith Motorsports	Chevrolet	Life Worth Living
55	Toni Breidinger	Venturini Motorsports	Toyota	FP Movement
66	Kyle Lockrow	Vandermeir Racing	Ford	Pedalin Pup
69	Scott Melton	Kimmel Racing	Toyota	Melton McFadden Insurance Agency
73	Andy Jankowiak	Jankowiak Motorsports	Ford	Phillips 66 Lubricants
91	Justin Carroll	TC Motorsports	Toyota	Carrolls Automotive
Official entry list

== Practice ==
The only 45-minute practice session was held on Saturday, October 23, at 11:00 a.m. CST. Ty Gibbs of Joe Gibbs Racing would set the fastest time in the session, with a lap of 30.318 and an average speed of 178.112 miles per hour (286.643 km/h).

Pos.	#	Driver	Team	Make	Time	Speed
1	18	Ty Gibbs	Joe Gibbs Racing	Toyota	30.318	178.112
2	20	Corey Heim	Venturini Motorsports	Toyota	30.672	176.056
3	2	Nick Sanchez (R)	Rev Racing	Chevrolet	30.683	175.993
Full practice results

== Qualifying ==
Qualifying was held on Saturday, October 23, at 12:45 p.m. EST. Each driver would have two laps to set their fastest lap; whichever lap was fastest would be considered their official lap time. Ty Gibbs of Joe Gibbs Racing would win the pole, setting a lap of 30.575 and an average speed of 176.615 miles per hour (284.234 km/h).

=== Full qualifying results ===
Pos.	#	Driver	Team	Make	Time	Speed
1	18	Ty Gibbs	Joe Gibbs Racing	Toyota	30.575	176.615
2	20	Corey Heim	Venturini Motorsports	Toyota	30.674	176.045
3	2	Nick Sanchez (R)	Rev Racing	Chevrolet	30.675	176.039
4	15	Drew Dollar	Venturini Motorsports	Toyota	30.911	174.695
5	46	J. P, Bergeron	David Gilliland Racing	Ford	30.989	174.255
6	28	Kyle Sieg	RSS Racing	Chevrolet	31.025	174.053
7	30	Kris Wright	Rette Jones Racing	Ford	31.038	174.980
8	35	Greg Van Alst	Greg Van Alst Motorsports	Ford	31.057	173.874
9	25	Parker Chase	Venturini Motorsports	Toyota	31.090	173.689
10	02	Connor Mosack	Young's Motorsports	Chevrolet	31.147	173.371
11	6	Rajah Caruth	Rev Racing	Chevrolet	31.220	172.966
12	40	Dean Thompson	Niece Motorsports	Chevrolet	31.436	171.778
13	73	Andy Jankowiak	Jankowiak Motorsports	Ford	31.772	169.961
14	69	Scott Melton	Kimmel Racing	Toyota	32.389	166.723
15	55	Toni Breidinger	Venturini Motorsports	Toyota	32.435	166,487
16	27	Zachary Tinkle	Richmond Clubb Motorsports	Toyota	32.436	166,482
17	11	Ron Vandermeir Jr.	Fast Track Racing	Ford	32.551	165.894
18	12	Tony Cosentino	Fast Track Racing	Toyota	32.692	165,178
19	7	Eric Caudell	CCM Racing	Toyota	33.087	163.206
20	01	D. L. Wilson	Fast Track Racing	Chevrolet	33.674	160.361
21	66	Kyle Lockrow	Vandermeir Racing	Ford	34.727	155.499
22	10	Arnout Kok	Fast Track Racing	Toyota	36.114	149.526
23	06	Brad Smith	Wayne Peterson Racing	Chevrolet	51.100	104.854
Official qualifying results

== Race results ==
Fin	St	#	Driver	Team	Make	Laps	Led	Status	Pts
1	3	2	Nick Sanchez (R)	Rev Racing	Chevrolet	102	2	running	47
2	1	18	Ty Gibbs	Joe Gibbs Racing	Toyota	102	99	running	44
3	2	20	Corey Heim	Venturini Motorsports	Toyota	102	1	running	42
4	4	15	Drew Dollar	Venturini Motorsports	Toyota	102	0	running	40
5	5	46	J. P. Bergeron	David Gilliland Racing	Ford	102	0	running	39
6	7	30	Kris Wright	Rette Jones Racing	Ford	101	0	running	38
7	6	28	Kyle Sieg	RSS Racing	Chevrolet	101	0	running	37
8	12	40	Dean Thompson	Niece Motorsports	Chevrolet	101	0	running	36
9	11	6	Rajah Caruth	Rev Racing	Chevrolet	101	0	running	35
10	9	25	Parker Chase	Venturini Motorsports	Toyota	100	0	running	34
11	10	02	Connor Mosack	Young's Motorsports	Chevrolet	100	0	running	33
12	14	69	Scott Melton	Kimmel Racing	Toyota	100	0	running	32
13	13	73	Andy Jankowiak	Jankowiak Motorsports	Ford	100	0	running	31
14	8	35	Greg Van Alst	Greg Van Alst Motorsports	Ford	100	0	running	30
15	17	11	Ron Vandermeir Jr.	Fast Track Racing	Ford	99	0	running	29
16	15	55	Toni Breidinger	Venturini Motorsports	Toyota	98	0	running	28
17	16	27	Zachary Tinkle	Richmond Clubb Motorsports	Toyota	94	0	running	27
18	20	01	D. L. Wilson	Fast Track Racing	Chevrolet	94	0	running	26
19	19	7	Eric Caudell	CCM Racing	Toyota	92	0	running	25
20	22	10	Arnout Kok	Fast Track Racing	Toyota	23	0	rear end	24
21	21	66	Kyle Lockrow	Vandermeir Racing	Ford	21	0	engine	23
22	18	12	Tony Cosentino	Fast Track Racing	Toyota	12	0	brakes	22
23	23	06	Brad Smith	Wayne Peterson Racing	Chevrolet	4	0	vibration	21
24	24	48	Wayne Peterson	Brad Smith Motorsports	Chevrolet	0	0	did not start	3
Official race results

Previous race: 2021 Sioux Chief PowerPEX 200	ARCA Menards Series; 2021 season	Next race: 2022 Lucas Oil 200
