= 2019 Sports Car Challenge of Mid-Ohio =

Fourth round of the 2019 IMSA SportsCar Championship season

The layout of Mid-Ohio Sports Car Course

The 2019 Acura Sports Car Challenge of Mid-Ohio was a sports car race sanctioned by the International Motor Sports Association (IMSA). The race was held at Mid-Ohio Sports Car Course in Lexington, Ohio, on May 5, 2019. It was the fourth round of the 2019 WeatherTech SportsCar Championship and the first round of the 2019 WeatherTech Sprint Cup.

== Background ==
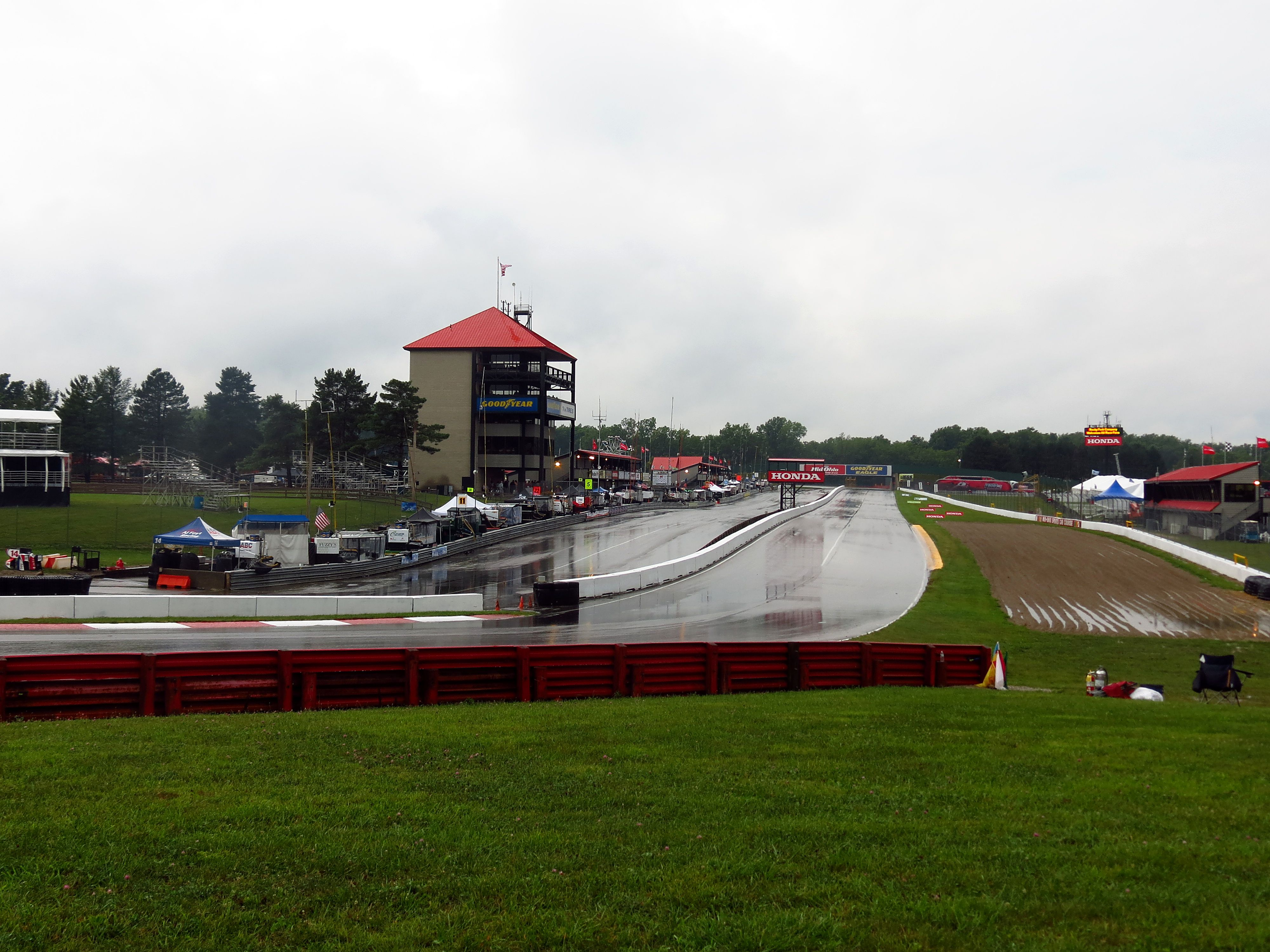
Mid-Ohio Sports Car Course, where the race was held.

International Motor Sports Association's (IMSA) president Scott Atherton confirmed the race was part of the schedule for the 2019 IMSA SportsCar Championship (IMSA SCC) in August 2018. It was the second consecutive year it was part of the WeatherTech SportsCar Championship. The 2019 Sports Car Challenge of Mid-Ohio was the fourth of twelve sports car races of 2019 by IMSA, and it was the first of seven rounds held as part of the WeatherTech Sprint Cup. The race was held at the thirteen-turn 2.258 mi (3.634 km) Mid-Ohio Sports Car Course in Lexington, Ohio on May 5, 2019.

The event marked the inaugural event of a new support championship for the GT Daytona (GTD) class called the WeatherTech Sprint Cup. It is a championship of all the non-endurance events in the GTD calendar, using the same scoring system as the overall full-time championship, unlike its sister support championship, the Michelin Endurance Cup.

Two and a half weeks prior to the event, Ford announced they would end their factory program with Chip Ganassi Racing in the GTLM class in both the World Endurance Championship and the WeatherTech championship at the end of 2019.

On April 24, 2019, IMSA released a technical bulletin regarding the Balance of Performance for the race. There were no changes made to either the DPi or GT Le Mans classes. In GTD, the Lamborghini Huracán GT3, which had been victorious in the previous two rounds at Daytona and Sebring, received a 30 kilogram weight increase and a 1-liter reduction in fuel capacity. In contrast, the Audi R8 LMS and Mercedes-AMG GT3 cars were given weight reductions of 25 and 20 kilograms, respectively. The McLaren 720S GT3 received its baseline weight of 1320 kilograms and RPM of 8,000 for its first IMSA event.

Before the race, Pipo Derani and Felipe Nasr led the DPi Drivers' Championship with 92 points, 2 points ahead of Hélio Castroneves and Ricky Taylor in second position followed by Filipe Albuquerque and João Barbosa in third with 89 points. In LMP2, Cameron Cassels and Kyle Masson led the Drivers' Championship with 67 points; the duo held a seven-point gap over Matt McMurry and Gabriel Aubry. Earl Bamber and Laurens Vanthoor led the GTLM Drivers' Championship with 91 points, ahead of Patrick Pilet and Nick Tandy with 87 points, and Antonio García and Jan Magnussen in third with 87 points. With 70 points, Mirko Bortolotti, Rik Breukers, and Rolf Ineichen led the GTD Drivers' Championship, 16 points clear of Frankie Montecalvo, Townsend Bell, and Aaron Telitz. Cadillac, Porsche, and Lamborghini were leading their respective Manufacturers' Championships, while Whelen Engineering Racing, Performance Tech Motorsports, Porsche GT Team, and GRT Grasser Racing Team each led their own Teams' Championships.

=== Entries ===
A total of 36 cars took part in the event split across four classes. There were 11 cars in the Daytona Prototype international (DPi) class, two in the Le Mans Prototype 2 (LMP2) class, eight entries in GT Le Mans (GTLM), and 15 entries in the GTD class.

There were some considerable additions and changes among the field. Lone Star Racing returned to IMSA competition in the GTD class, having previously participated at Laguna Seca in 2017. Starworks Motorsport driver Parker Chase, who had previously only been on contract for the endurance events, would sign an agreement to run the full season with Starworks in 2019, alongside the existing full-season driver Ryan Dalziel. The biggest addition to the entry list, however, was Compass Racing, who would field a new McLaren 720S GT3 with factory backing in the full Sprint Cup-only campaign for the season. Their drivers were McLaren factory driver Paul Holton and Matt Plumb. On April 19, 2019, McLaren Automotive signed a multi-year agreement with IMSA in which they officially became an automotive partner of the International Motor Sports Association.

After initially confirming full-season programs, GTD teams Precision Performance Motorsports and P1 Motorsports would not return for Mid-Ohio, with the latter pulling the plug on using their Mercedes-AMG GT3 cars in championships.

Due to scheduling conflicts for full-season drivers Gabriel Aubry, Patrick Lindsey and Harry Tincknell, who were at Circuit de Spa-Francorchamps for the FIA World Endurance Championship, drivers Eric Lux, Marco Seefried and Ryan Hunter-Reay respectively would replace these drivers for the Mid-Ohio event.

== Practice ==
There were three practice sessions preceding the start of the race on Sunday, two on Friday and one on Saturday. The session on Friday morning lasted 75 minutes while the second session on Friday afternoon lasted one hour. The third session on Saturday morning lasted one hour.

=== Practice 1 ===
The first practice session took place at 10:05 am ET on Friday and ended with Juan Pablo Montoya topping the charts for Acura Team Penske, with a lap time of 1:41.568. Colin Braun put the No. 54 CORE Autosport second fastest in the DPi class followed by the No. 7 Acura of Ricky Taylor. Earl Bamber set the fastest time in GTLM with a time of 1:42.230, 2.208 seconds faster than Tom Blomqvist's No. 25 BMW. Trent Hindman was fastest in GTD. Neither of the LMP2 entries set a lap time. 14 of the 36 entries did not get a time in due to heavy rain.

Pos.	Class	No.	Team	Driver	Time	Gap
1	DPi	6	Acura Team Penske	Juan Pablo Montoya	1:41.568	_
2	GTLM	912	Porsche GT Team	Earl Bamber	1:42.230	+0.662
3	GTLM	25	BMW Team RLL	Tom Blomqvist	1:44.438	+2.870

=== Practice 2 ===
The second practice session took place at 3:15 PM ET on Friday and ended with Oliver Jarvis topping the charts for Mazda Team Joest, with a lap time of 1:28.158. The No. 55 Mazda of Ryan Hunter-Reay was second fastest followed by Simon Trummer in the No. 84 Cadillac. Eric Lux set the fastest time in LMP2. The GTLM class was topped by the No. 911 Porsche GT Team Porsche 911 RSR of Nick Tandy with a time of 1:32.142. Jesse Krohn in the No. 24 BMW was second fastest followed by Laurens Vanthoor in the No. 912 Porsche. The GTD class was topped by the No. 14 AIM Vasser Sullivan Lexus RC F GT3 of Jack Hawksworth with a time of 1:30.190. Zacharie Robichon was second fastest in the No. 9 Pfaff Motorsports Porsche followed by Marco Seefried in the No. 73 Park Place Motorsports Porsche. The Konica Minolta Cadillac, Whelen Engineering Racing, and Starworks Motorsport entries did not set a lap time. The session was red flagged two times. 6 minutes into the session, Ricky Taylor spun the No. 7 Acura ARX-05 at turn 12 and hit the tire barrier. Taylor got the car back to the pit lane and the session was stopped for eight minutes. The final stoppage came when Will Hardeman spun the No. 19 Audi at turn 12 and was beached in the gravel trap.

Pos.	Class	No.	Team	Driver	Time	Gap
1	DPi	77	Mazda Team Joest	Oliver Jarvis	1:28.158	_
2	DPi	55	Mazda Team Joest	Ryan Hunter-Reay	1:28.222	+0.064
3	DPi	84	JDC-Miller Motorsports	Simon Trummer	1:28.556	+0.398

=== Practice 3 ===
The third and final practice session took place at 8:00 am ET and ended with Hélio Castroneves topping the charts for Acura Team Penske, with a lap time of 1:12.737. Dane Cameron was second fastest in the sister No. 6 Acura followed by João Barbosa in the No. 5 Cadillac. Kyle Masson set the fastest time in LMP2. The GTLM class was topped by the No. 67 Ford Chip Ganassi Racing Ford GT of Ryan Briscoe with a time of 1:20.100. Laurens Vanthoor was second fastest in the No. 912 Porsche GT Team entry followed by Patrick Pilet in the sister No. 911 Porsche. The GTD class was topped by the No. 86 Meyer Shank Racing Acura NSX GT3 Evo of Trent Hindman with a time of 1:21.818. Richard Heistand was second fastest in the No. 14 Lexus followed by Lawson Aschenbach in the No. 74 Lone Star Racing Mercedes-AMG. The session was red flagged two times. 4 minutes into the session, Townsend Bell's No. 12 Lexus went wide at turn 2 and got stuck in the grass. The final stoppage came when Bell's co-driver, Frankie Montecalvo went wide at the Carousel and got stuck in the grass. Montecalvo got the car back to the pit lane and the session was restarted with 6 minutes remaining.

Pos.	Class	No.	Team	Driver	Time	Gap
1	DPi	7	Acura Team Penske	Hélio Castroneves	1:12.737	_
2	DPi	6	Acura Team Penske	Dane Cameron	1:13.563	+0.826
3	DPi	5	Mustang Sampling Racing	João Barbosa	1:13.851	+1.114

== Qualifying ==
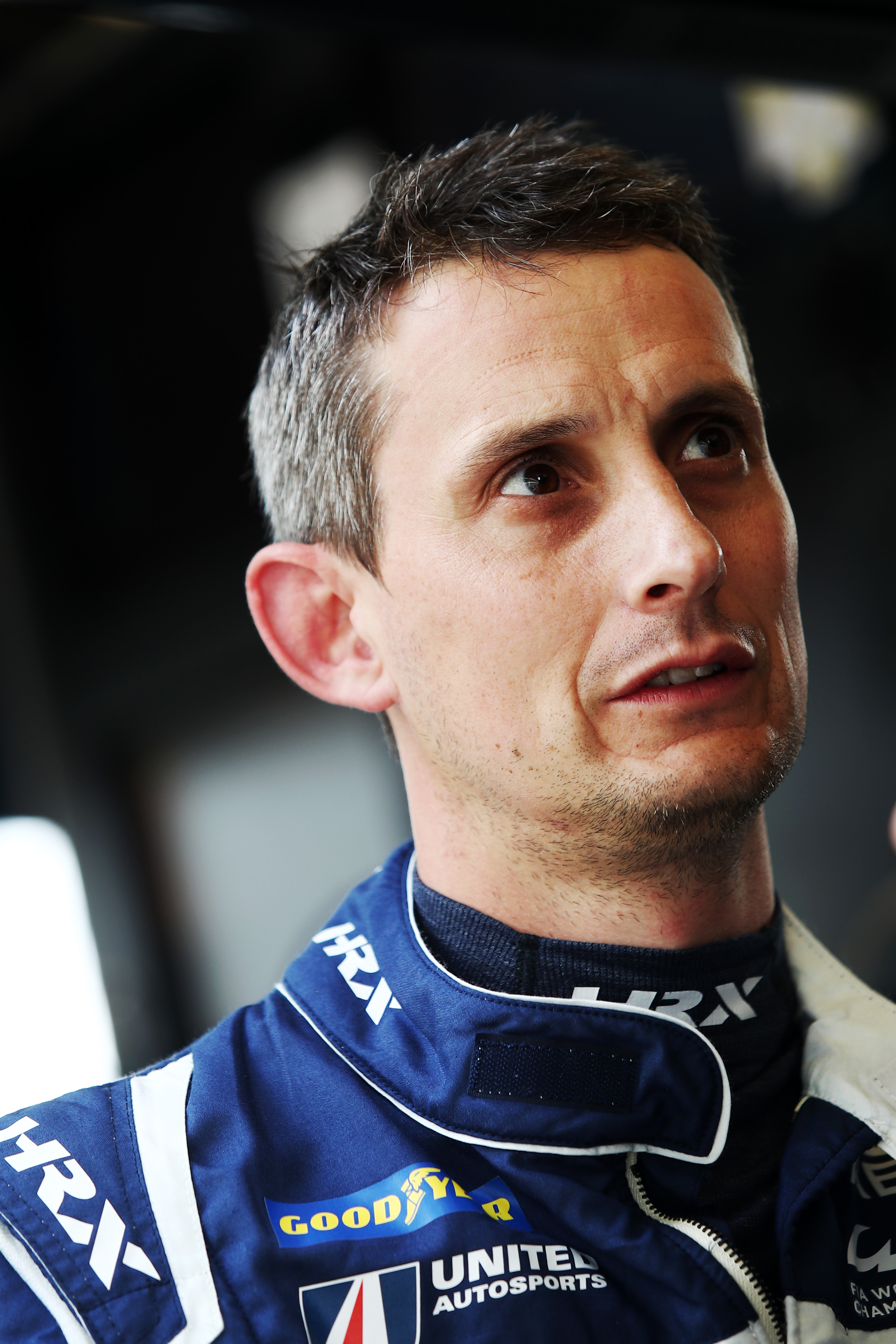
Oliver Jarvis (pictured in 2022) helped take the No. 77 Mazda's second pole position of 2019.

Saturday's late morning qualification session was broken into three groups that lasted 15 minutes each. Cars in GTD were sent out first before those grouped in GTLM and DPi/LMP2 had two separate identically timed sessions. All cars were required to be driven by one participant and the starting order was determined by the competitor's fastest lap. IMSA then arranged the grid so that the DPi, LMP2, and GTLM cars started in front of the GTD field.

The first was for cars in the GTD class. Richard Heistand qualified on pole for the class driving the No. 14 car for AIM Vasser Sullivan. The session saw one incident when Marco Seefried, driving the No. 73 Park Place Motorsports Porsche, spun at turn two and got stuck in the grass. Seefried had his best two laps from the session deleted for causing a red flag, effectively leaving him with no time set. Zacharie Robichon was second fastest, but lost his fastest lap for not serving a drive-through penalty in the pitlane during the session's only red flag. As a result, Robichon would start from fifth position, while Ben Keating in the No. 33 Mercedes-AMG was promoted to second followed by Frankie Montecalvo's No. 12 Lexus in third position, and Will Hardeman's No. 19 Audi in fourth.

The second session was for cars in the GTLM class. Sébastien Bourdais qualified on pole for the class driving the No. 66 car for Ford Chip Ganassi Racing, besting Laurens Vanthoor in the No. 912 Porsche GT Team entry by 0.275 seconds. Following in third was Jesse Krohn's No. 24 BMW with the No. 4 Corvette of Tommy Milner in fourth. Ryan Briscoe completed the top five in the No. 67 Ford GT followed by Connor De Phillippi's No. 25 BMW in sixth. The No. 3 Corvette Racing and No. 911 Porsche GT Team entries rounded out the GTLM qualifiers.

The final session of qualifying was for cars in the LMP2 and DPi classes. Oliver Jarvis qualified on pole driving the No. 77 car for Mazda Team Joest, beating Hélio Castroneves in the No. 7 Acura by 0.022 seconds. Jarvis ran out of fuel on his final lap and coasted to the pitlane. Dane Cameron qualified the No. 6 Acura Team Penske entry in third position followed by Pipo Derani's No. 31 Whelen Engineering Racing Cadillac. João Barbosa in the No. 5 Mustang Sampling Racing Cadillac started from fifth place. Following in sixth was Ryan Hunter-Reay's No. 55 Mazda followed by Renger van der Zande in the No. 10 Konica Minolta Cadillac in seventh place. Kyle Masson's No. 38 Performance Tech Motorsports Oreca set the fastest time in LMP2, but the car would be dropped to the rear of the LMP2 field because the team changed their starting driver. As a result, Eric Lux was promoted to first and would start the race from pole position.

=== Qualifying Results ===
Pole positions in each class are indicated in bold and by ‡.

Pos.	Class	No.	Team	Driver	Time	Gap	Grid
1	**DPi**	**77**	**(Germany) Mazda Team Joest**	**(United Kingdom) Oliver Jarvis**	**1:10.705**	**_**	1‡
2	DPi	7	(United States) Acura Team Penske	(Brazil) Hélio Castroneves	1:10.727	+0.022	2
3	DPi	6	(United States) Acura Team Penske	(United States) Dane Cameron	1:10.806	+0.101	3
4	DPi	31	(United States) Whelen Engineering Racing	(Brazil) Pipo Derani	1:11.720	+1.016	4
5	DPi	5	(United States) Mustang Sampling Racing	(Portugal) João Barbosa	1:12.320	+1.615	5
6	DPi	55	(Germany) Mazda Team Joest	(United States) Ryan Hunter-Reay	1:12.326	+1.621	6
7	DPi	10	(United States) Konica Minolta Cadillac	(Netherlands) Renger van der Zande	1:12.525	+1.820	7
8	DPi	84	(United States) JDC-Miller Motorsports	(Switzerland) Simon Trummer	1:12.595	+1.890	8
9	DPi	50	(Argentina) Juncos Racing	(United States) Will Owen	1:13.394	+2.689	9
10	DPi	85	(United States) JDC-Miller Motorsports	(Canada) Misha Goikhberg	1:13.570	+2.865	10
11	LMP2	38	(United States) Performance Tech Motorsports	(United States) Kyle Masson	1:14.877	+4.172	13^{1}
13	DPi	54	(United States) CORE Autosport	(United States) Jon Bennett	1:17.321	+6.616	11
13	**GTLM**	**66**	**(United States) Ford Chip Ganassi Racing**	**(France) Sébastien Bourdais**	**1:19.124**	**+8.419**	14‡
14	GTLM	912	(United States) Porsche GT Team	(Belgium) Laurens Vanthoor	1:19.399	+8.694	15
15	GTLM	24	(United States) BMW Team RLL	(Finland) Jesse Krohn	1:19.623	+8.918	16
16	GTLM	4	(United States) Corvette Racing	(United States) Tommy Milner	1:19.721	+9.016	17
17	GTLM	67	(United States) Ford Chip Ganassi Racing	(Australia) Ryan Briscoe	1:19.724	+9.019	18
18	GTLM	25	(United States) BMW Team RLL	(United States) Connor De Phillippi	1:19.893	+9.188	19
19	GTLM	3	(United States) Corvette Racing	(Denmark) Jan Magnussen	1:19.919	+9.214	20
20	GTLM	911	(United States) Porsche GT Team	(France) Patrick Pilet	1:20.026	+9.321	21
21	**LMP2**	**52**	**(United States) PR1/ Mathiasen Motorsports**	**(United States) Eric Lux**	**1:21.752**	**+11.047**	12‡
22	**GTD**	**14**	**(Canada) AIM Vasser Sullivan**	**(United States) Richard Heistand**	**1:24.281**	**+13.576**	22‡
23	GTD	33	(United States) Mercedes-AMG Team Riley Motorsports	(United States) Ben Keating	1:26.109	+15.404	23
24	GTD	12	(Canada) AIM Vasser Sullivan	(United States) Frankie Montecalvo	1:26.451	+15.746	24
25	GTD	19	(United States) Moorespeed	(United States) Will Hardeman	1:26.951	+16.246	25
26	GTD	9	(Canada) Pfaff Motorsports	(Canada) Zacharie Robichon	1:27.113	+16.408	26
27	GTD	96	(United States) Turner Motorsport	(United States) Robby Foley	1:27.152	+16.447	27
28	GTD	48	(United States) Paul Miller Racing	(United States) Ryan Hardwick	1:27.300	+16.595	28
29	GTD	76	(Canada) Compass Racing	(United States) Matt Plumb	1:27.657	+16.952	29
30	GTD	86	(United States) Meyer Shank Racing with Curb-Agajanian	(United States) Trent Hindman	1:27.725	+17.020	30
31	GTD	8	(United States) Starworks Motorsport	(United States) Parker Chase	1:27.753	+17.048	31
32	GTD	63	(United States) Scuderia Corsa	(United States) Cooper MacNeil	1:27.777	+17.072	32
33	GTD	74	(United States) Lone Star Racing	(United States) Gar Robinson	1:30.778	+20.073	33
34	GTD	44	(United States) Magnus Racing	(United States) John Potter	1:31.124	+20.419	34
35	GTD	57	(United States) Heinricher Racing w/Meyer Shank Racing	(Denmark) Christina Nielsen	1:31.851	+21.146	35
36	GTD	73	(United States) Park Place Motorsports	None	None	N/A	36
Sources:

- ^{1} The No. 38 Performance Tech Motorsports was moved to the back of the LMP2 field for starting the race with a different driver than who qualified.

== Race ==
=== Post-race ===
The final results of DPi kept Derani and Nasr atop the Drivers' Championship with 120 points while Albuquerque and Barbose dropped from third to fifth. Cameron and Montoya's victory allowed them to advance from fifth to fourth. The final results of LMP2 kept Cassels and Masson atop the Drivers' Championship, but their advantage was reduced to four points by race winner McMurry. With a total of 126 points, Bamber and Vanthoor's victory allowed them to extend their advantage to seven points while García and Magnussen took over second position in the GTLM Drivers' Championship. Farnbacher and Hindman took the lead of the GTD Drivers' Championship with 84 points while the absent Bortolotti, Breukers, and Ineichen dropped to sixth. Heinstand and Hawksworth advanced from seventh to third while Long jumped from sixth to fourth. Cadillac, Porsche, and Lamborghini continued to top their respective Manufacturers' Championships while, Whelen Engineering Racing, Performance Tech Motorsports, and Porsche GT Team kept their respective advantages in their Teams' Championships. Meyer Shank Racing took the lead of the GTD Teams' Championship with eight rounds left in the season.

=== Race results ===
Class winners are denoted in bold and ‡.

Pos	Class	No.	Team	Drivers	Chassis	Laps	Time/Retired
Pos	Class	No.	Team	Drivers	Engine	Laps	Time/Retired
1	**DPi**	**6**	**(United States) Acura Team Penske**	**(United States) Dane Cameron (Colombia) Juan Pablo Montoya**	**Acura ARX-05**	**123**	**2:41:05.736‡**
1	**DPi**	**6**	**(United States) Acura Team Penske**	**(United States) Dane Cameron (Colombia) Juan Pablo Montoya**	**Acura AR35TT 3.5 L Turbo V6**	**123**	**2:41:05.736‡**
2	DPi	77	(Germany) Mazda Team Joest	(United Kingdom) Oliver Jarvis (United States) Tristan Nunez	Mazda RT24-P	123	+2.022
2	DPi	77	(Germany) Mazda Team Joest	(United Kingdom) Oliver Jarvis (United States) Tristan Nunez	Mazda MZ-2.0T 2.0 L Turbo I4	123	+2.022
3	DPi	55	(Germany) Mazda Team Joest	(United States) Jonathan Bomarito (United States) Ryan Hunter-Reay	Mazda RT24-P	123	+30.050
3	DPi	55	(Germany) Mazda Team Joest	(United States) Jonathan Bomarito (United States) Ryan Hunter-Reay	Mazda MZ-2.0T 2.0 L Turbo I4	123	+30.050
4	DPi	31	(United States) Whelen Engineering Racing	(Brazil) Pipo Derani (Brazil) Felipe Nasr	Cadillac DPi-V.R	123	+39.114
4	DPi	31	(United States) Whelen Engineering Racing	(Brazil) Pipo Derani (Brazil) Felipe Nasr	Cadillac 5.5 L V8	123	+39.114
5	DPi	7	(United States) Acura Team Penske	(Brazil) Hélio Castroneves (United States) Ricky Taylor	Acura ARX-05	122	+1 Lap
5	DPi	7	(United States) Acura Team Penske	(Brazil) Hélio Castroneves (United States) Ricky Taylor	Acura AR35TT 3.5 L Turbo V6	122	+1 Lap
6	DPi	10	(United States) Konica Minolta Cadillac	(United States) Jordan Taylor (Netherlands) Renger van der Zande	Cadillac DPi-V.R	122	+1 Lap
6	DPi	10	(United States) Konica Minolta Cadillac	(United States) Jordan Taylor (Netherlands) Renger van der Zande	Cadillac 5.5 L V8	122	+1 Lap
7	DPi	84	(United States) JDC-Miller Motorsports	(South Africa) Stephen Simpson (Switzerland) Simon Trummer	Cadillac DPi-V.R	122	+1 Lap
7	DPi	84	(United States) JDC-Miller Motorsports	(South Africa) Stephen Simpson (Switzerland) Simon Trummer	Cadillac 5.5 L V8	122	+1 Lap
8	DPi	5	(United States) Mustang Sampling Racing	(Portugal) Filipe Albuquerque (Portugal) João Barbosa	Cadillac DPi-V.R	122	+1 Lap
8	DPi	5	(United States) Mustang Sampling Racing	(Portugal) Filipe Albuquerque (Portugal) João Barbosa	Cadillac 5.5 L V8	122	+1 Lap
9	DPi	50	(United States) Juncos Racing	(United States) Kyle Kaiser (United States) Will Owen	Cadillac DPi-V.R	122	+1 Lap
9	DPi	50	(United States) Juncos Racing	(United States) Kyle Kaiser (United States) Will Owen	Cadillac 5.5 L V8	122	+1 Lap
10	DPi	85	(United States) JDC-Miller Motorsports	(Canada) Misha Goikhberg (France) Tristan Vautier	Cadillac DPi-V.R	122	+1 Lap
10	DPi	85	(United States) JDC-Miller Motorsports	(Canada) Misha Goikhberg (France) Tristan Vautier	Cadillac 5.5 L V8	122	+1 Lap
11	**LMP2**	**52**	**(United States) PR1/ Mathiasen Motorsports**	**(United States) Eric Lux (United States) Matt McMurry**	**Oreca 07**	**116**	**+7 Laps‡**
11	**LMP2**	**52**	**(United States) PR1/ Mathiasen Motorsports**	**(United States) Eric Lux (United States) Matt McMurry**	**Gibson GK428 4.2 L V8**	**116**	**+7 Laps‡**
12	**GTLM**	**912**	**(United States) Porsche GT Team**	**(New Zealand) Earl Bamber (Belgium) Laurens Vanthoor**	**Porsche 911 RSR**	**116**	**+7 Laps‡**
12	**GTLM**	**912**	**(United States) Porsche GT Team**	**(New Zealand) Earl Bamber (Belgium) Laurens Vanthoor**	**Porsche 4.0 L Flat-6**	**116**	**+7 Laps‡**
13	GTLM	3	(United States) Corvette Racing	(Spain) Antonio García (Denmark) Jan Magnussen	Chevrolet Corvette C7.R	116	+7 Laps
13	GTLM	3	(United States) Corvette Racing	(Spain) Antonio García (Denmark) Jan Magnussen	Chevrolet LT5.5 5.5 L V8	116	+7 Laps
14	GTLM	911	(United States) Porsche GT Team	(France) Patrick Pilet (United Kingdom) Nick Tandy	Porsche 911 RSR	116	+7 Laps
14	GTLM	911	(United States) Porsche GT Team	(France) Patrick Pilet (United Kingdom) Nick Tandy	Porsche 4.0 L Flat-6	116	+7 Laps
15	GTLM	25	(United States) BMW Team RLL	(United Kingdom) Tom Blomqvist (United States) Connor De Phillippi	BMW M8 GTE	116	+7 Laps
15	GTLM	25	(United States) BMW Team RLL	(United Kingdom) Tom Blomqvist (United States) Connor De Phillippi	BMW S63 4.0 L Twin-turbo V8	116	+7 Laps
16	GTLM	67	(United States) Ford Chip Ganassi Racing	(Australia) Ryan Briscoe (United Kingdom) Richard Westbrook	Ford GT	116	+7 Laps
16	GTLM	67	(United States) Ford Chip Ganassi Racing	(Australia) Ryan Briscoe (United Kingdom) Richard Westbrook	Ford EcoBoost 3.5 L Turbo V6	116	+7 Laps
17	GTLM	24	(United States) BMW Team RLL	(United States) John Edwards (Finland) Jesse Krohn	BMW M8 GTE	116	+7 Laps
17	GTLM	24	(United States) BMW Team RLL	(United States) John Edwards (Finland) Jesse Krohn	BMW S63 4.0 L Twin-turbo V8	116	+7 Laps
18	GTLM	66	(United States) Ford Chip Ganassi Racing	(France) Sébastien Bourdais (Germany) Dirk Müller	Ford GT	115	+8 Laps‡
18	GTLM	66	(United States) Ford Chip Ganassi Racing	(France) Sébastien Bourdais (Germany) Dirk Müller	Ford EcoBoost 3.5 L Turbo V6	115	+8 Laps‡
19	**GTD**	**14**	**(Canada) AIM Vasser Sullivan**	**(United Kingdom) Jack Hawksworth (United States) Richard Heistand**	**Lexus RC F GT3**	**114**	**+9 Laps‡**
19	**GTD**	**14**	**(Canada) AIM Vasser Sullivan**	**(United Kingdom) Jack Hawksworth (United States) Richard Heistand**	**Lexus 5.0 L V8**	**114**	**+9 Laps‡**
20	GTD	86	(United States) Meyer Shank Racing with Curb-Agajanian	(Germany) Mario Farnbacher (United States) Trent Hindman	Acura NSX GT3 Evo	114	+9 Laps
20	GTD	86	(United States) Meyer Shank Racing with Curb-Agajanian	(Germany) Mario Farnbacher (United States) Trent Hindman	Acura 3.5 L Turbo V6	114	+9 Laps
21	GTD	48	(United States) Paul Miller Racing	(United States) Ryan Hardwick (United States) Bryan Sellers	Lamborghini Huracán GT3 Evo	113	+10 Laps
21	GTD	48	(United States) Paul Miller Racing	(United States) Ryan Hardwick (United States) Bryan Sellers	Lamborghini 5.2 L V10	113	+10 Laps
22	GTD	73	(United States) Park Place Motorsports	(United States) Patrick Long (Germany) Marco Seefried	Porsche 911 GT3 R	113	+10 Laps
22	GTD	73	(United States) Park Place Motorsports	(United States) Patrick Long (Germany) Marco Seefried	Porsche 4.0 L Flat-6	113	+10 Laps
23	GTD	12	(Canada) AIM Vasser Sullivan	(United States) Townsend Bell (United States) Frankie Montecalvo	Lexus RC F GT3	113	+10 Laps
23	GTD	12	(Canada) AIM Vasser Sullivan	(United States) Townsend Bell (United States) Frankie Montecalvo	Lexus 5.0 L V8	113	+10 Laps
24	GTD	19	(United States) Moorespeed	(United States) Will Hardeman (Spain) Alex Riberas	Audi R8 LMS GT3	123	+10 Laps
24	GTD	19	(United States) Moorespeed	(United States) Will Hardeman (Spain) Alex Riberas	Audi 5.2 L V10	123	+10 Laps
25	GTD	63	(United States) Scuderia Corsa	(United States) Cooper MacNeil (Finland) Toni Vilander	Ferrari 488 GT3	122	+11 Laps
25	GTD	63	(United States) Scuderia Corsa	(United States) Cooper MacNeil (Finland) Toni Vilander	Ferrari F154 3.9 L Turbo V8	122	+11 Laps
26	GTD	44	(United States) Magnus Racing	(United States) Andy Lally (United States) John Potter	Lamborghini Huracán GT3 Evo	112	+11 Laps
26	GTD	44	(United States) Magnus Racing	(United States) Andy Lally (United States) John Potter	Lamborghini 5.2 L V10	112	+11 Laps
27	GTD	8	(United States) Starworks Motorsport	(United States) Parker Chase (United Kingdom) Ryan Dalziel	Audi R8 LMS GT3	112	+11 Laps
27	GTD	8	(United States) Starworks Motorsport	(United States) Parker Chase (United Kingdom) Ryan Dalziel	Audi 5.2 L V10	112	+11 Laps
28	GTD	57	(United States) Heinricher Racing w/Meyer Shank Racing	(United Kingdom) Katherine Legge (Denmark) Christina Nielsen	Acura NSX GT3 Evo	112	+11 Laps
28	GTD	57	(United States) Heinricher Racing w/Meyer Shank Racing	(United Kingdom) Katherine Legge (Denmark) Christina Nielsen	Acura 3.5 L Turbo V6	112	+11 Laps
29	GTD	74	(United States) Lone Star Racing	(United States) Lawson Aschenbach (United States) Gar Robinson	Mercedes-AMG GT3	112	+11 Laps
29	GTD	74	(United States) Lone Star Racing	(United States) Lawson Aschenbach (United States) Gar Robinson	Mercedes-AMG M159 6.2 L V8	112	+11 Laps
30 DNF	GTD	9	(Canada) Pfaff Motorsports	(Canada) Scott Hargrove (Canada) Zacharie Robichon	Porsche 911 GT3 R	107	Spun Off
30 DNF	GTD	9	(Canada) Pfaff Motorsports	(Canada) Scott Hargrove (Canada) Zacharie Robichon	Porsche 4.0 L Flat-6	107	Spun Off
31	GTLM	4	(United States) Corvette Racing	(United Kingdom) Oliver Gavin (United States) Tommy Milner	Chevrolet Corvette C7.R	105	+18 Laps
31	GTLM	4	(United States) Corvette Racing	(United Kingdom) Oliver Gavin (United States) Tommy Milner	Chevrolet LT5.5 5.5 L V8	105	+18 Laps
32 DNF	DPi	54	(United States) CORE Autosport	(United States) Jon Bennett (United States) Colin Braun	Nissan DPi	97	Suspension
32 DNF	DPi	54	(United States) CORE Autosport	(United States) Jon Bennett (United States) Colin Braun	Nissan VR38DETT 3.8 L Turbo V6	97	Suspension
33 DNF	GTD	76	(Canada) Compass Racing	(United States) Paul Holton (United States) Matt Plumb	McLaren 720S GT3	82	Electrical
33 DNF	GTD	76	(Canada) Compass Racing	(United States) Paul Holton (United States) Matt Plumb	McLaren M480T 4.0 L Twin-turbo V8	82	Electrical
34	LMP2	38	(United States) Performance Tech Motorsports	(Canada) Cameron Cassels (United States) Kyle Masson	Oreca 07	82	+41 Laps
34	LMP2	38	(United States) Performance Tech Motorsports	(Canada) Cameron Cassels (United States) Kyle Masson	Gibson GK428 4.2 L V8	82	+41 Laps
35 DNF	GTD	33	(United States) Mercedes-AMG Team Riley Motorsports	(Netherlands) Jeroen Bleekemolen (United States) Ben Keating	Mercedes-AMG GT3	34	Crash Damage
35 DNF	GTD	33	(United States) Mercedes-AMG Team Riley Motorsports	(Netherlands) Jeroen Bleekemolen (United States) Ben Keating	Mercedes-AMG M159 6.2 L V8	34	Crash Damage
36 DNF	GTD	96	(United States) Turner Motorsport	(United States) Bill Auberlen (United States) Robby Foley	BMW M6 GT3	1	Crash Damage
36 DNF	GTD	96	(United States) Turner Motorsport	(United States) Bill Auberlen (United States) Robby Foley	BMW 4.4 L Turbo V8	1	Crash Damage

== Standings after the race ==
DPi Drivers' Championship standings
Pos.	+/–	Driver	Points
1		(Brazil) Pipo Derani (Brazil) Felipe Nasr	120
2		(Brazil) Hélio Castroneves (United States) Ricky Taylor	116
3	1	(United States) Jordan Taylor (Netherlands) Renger van der Zande	113
4	1	(United States) Dane Cameron (Colombia) Juan Pablo Montoya	112
5	2	(Portugal) Filipe Albuquerque (Portugal) João Barbosa	112

LMP2 Drivers' Championship standings
Pos.	+/–	Driver	Points
1		(Canada) Cameron Cassels (United States) Kyle Masson	99
2		(United States) Matt McMurry	95
3	1	(France) Gabriel Aubry	60
4	1	(Colombia) Sebastián Saavedra (Venezuela) Pastor Maldonado (Republic of Ireland) Ryan Cullen (Mexico) Roberto González	35
5	1	(United States) Andrew Evans	35

GTLM Drivers' Championship standings
Pos.	+/–	Driver	Points
1	4	(New Zealand) Earl Bamber (Belgium) Laurens Vanthoor	126
2	1	(Spain) Antonio García (Denmark) Jan Magnussen	119
3	1	(France) Patrick Pilet (United Kingdom) Nick Tandy	117
4	1	(United States) Connor De Phillippi	111
5	1	(Germany) Dirk Müller (France) Sebastien Bourdais	108

GTD Drivers' Championship standings
Pos.	+/–	Driver	Points
1	3	(Germany) Mario Farnbacher (United States) Trent Hindman	84
2		(United States) Frankie Montecalvo (United States) Townsend Bell	80
3	4	(United States) Richard Heistand (United Kingdom) Jack Hawksworth	77
4	2	(United States) Patrick Long	77
5	2	(United States) Andy Lally (United States) John Potter	76

- Note: Only the top five positions are included for all sets of standings.

DPi Teams' Championship standings
Pos.	+/–	Team	Points
1		(United States) #31 Whelen Engineering Racing	120
2		(United States) #7 Acura Team Penske	116
3	1	(United States) #10 Konica Minolta Cadillac	113
4	1	(United States) #6 Acura Team Penske	112
5	2	(United States) #5 Mustang Sampling Racing	100

LMP2 Teams' Championship standings
Pos.	+/–	Team	Points
1		(United States) #38 Performance Tech Motorsports	99
2		(United States) #52 PR1/Mathiasen Motorsports	95
3		(United States) #18 DragonSpeed	35
4		(United States) #81 DragonSpeed	30

GTLM Teams' Championship standings
Pos.	+/–	Team	Points
1		(United States) #912 Porsche GT Team	126
2	1	(United States) #3 Corvette Racing	119
3	1	(United States) #911 Porsche GT Team	117
4	1	(United States) #25 BMW Team RLL	111
5	1	(United States) #66 Ford Chip Ganassi Racing	108

GTD Teams' Championship standings
Pos.	+/–	Team	Points
1	3	(United States) #86 Meyer-Shank Racing with Curb Agajanian	84
2		(Canada) #12 AIM Vasser Sullivan	80
3	4	(Canada) #14 AIM Vasser Sullivan	77
4		(United States) #73 Park Place Motorsports	77
5	2	(United States) #44 Magnus Racing	76

- Note: Only the top five positions are included for all sets of standings.

DPi Manufacturers' Championship standings
Pos.	+/–	Manufacturer	Points
1		(United States) Cadillac	135
2		(Japan) Acura	131
3	1	(Japan) Mazda	118
4	1	(Japan) Nissan	116

GTLM Manufacturers' Championship standings
Pos.	+/–	Manufacturer	Points
1		(Germany) Porsche	135
2		(Germany) BMW	121
3	1	(United States) Chevrolet	120
4	1	(United States) Ford	118
5		(Italy) Ferrari	32

GTD Manufacturers' Championship standings
Pos.	+/–	Manufacturer	Points
1		(Italy) Lamborghini	100
2	1	(Japan) Lexus	91
3	1	(Germany) Audi	86
4	2	(Japan) Acura	85
5	1	(Italy) Ferrari	81

- Note: Only the top five positions are included for all sets of standings.

IMSA SportsCar Championship
Previous race: 2019 BUBBA Burger Sports Car Grand Prix	2019 season	Next race: 2019 Chevrolet Sports Car Classic
