= 2021 Calypso Lemonade 200 =

Race details
- Race 12 of 20 of the 2021 ARCA Menards Series; Race 6 of 10 of the 2021 Sioux Chief Showdown
- Date: July 31, 2021
- Official name: 26th Annual Calypso Lemonade 200
- Location: Winchester, Indiana, Winchester Speedway
- Course: Permanent racing facility
- Course length: 0.805 km (0.5 miles)
- Distance: 205 laps, 102.5 mi (165 km)
- Scheduled distance: 200 laps, 100 mi (160 km)
- Average speed: 69.426 miles per hour (111.730 km/h)

Pole position
Driver	Corey Heim	Venturini Motorsports
- Time: 15.796

Most laps led
Driver	Corey Heim	Venturini Motorsports
- Laps: 175

Winner
No. 18	Ty Gibbs	Joe Gibbs Racing

Television in the United States
- Network: MAVTV
- Announcers: Bob Dillner, Jim Trebow

Radio in the United States
- Radio: ARCA Racing Network

The 2021 Calypso Lemonade 200 was the 12th stock car race of the 2021 ARCA Menards Series season, the sixth race of the 2021 Sioux Chief Showdown, and the 26th iteration of the event. The race was held on Saturday, July 31, in Winchester, Indiana at Winchester Speedway, a 1/2 mile (0.80 km) permanent, oval-shaped, high-banked racetrack. The race was extended from 200 laps to 205 laps due to a green–white–checker finish. After Corey Heim would spin within the closing laps of the race, Ty Gibbs would defend against a charging Greg Van Alst to win his 15th ARCA Menards Series career win, his seventh of the season, and his second consecutive win. To fill out the podium, Heim would come back to finish third.

== Background ==
Winchester Speedway is a half-mile paved oval motor racetrack in White River Township, Randolph County, just outside Winchester, Indiana, approximately 90 miles (145 km) northeast of Indianapolis. It seats 4000 spectators. It is also known as the "World's Fastest 1/2 mile".

The track's 37 degree banking is one of the steepest in motorsports, and the highest-banked active racetrack in the country. Notable drivers that raced at Winchester include Rusty Wallace, Mark Martin, Jeff Gordon, Tony Stewart, Ryan Newman, Sarah Fisher and Chase Briscoe.

=== Entry list ===
#	Driver	Team	Make	Sponsor
01	Owen Smith	Fast Track Racing	Ford	Academy Mortgage
2	Nick Sanchez	Rev Racing	Chevrolet	Max Siegel Incorporated
06	Zachary Tinkle	Wayne Peterson Racing	Ford	Great Railing
10	Brandon Varney	Fast Track Racing	Toyota	Van's Tire Center
11	Tony Cosentino	Fast Track Racing	Toyota	The Brews Box, Tamayo Sports
12	D. L. Wilson	Fast Track Racing	Chevrolet	Leggott Tractors of Waco, Inc.
15	Parker Chase	Venturini Motorsports	Toyota	Eagle Marine, NXTLVL Marine
17	Taylor Gray	David Gilliland Racing	Ford	Ripper Coffee Company
18	Ty Gibbs	Joe Gibbs Racing	Toyota	Joe Gibbs Racing
20	Corey Heim	Venturini Motorsports	Toyota	Craftsman
21	Daniel Dye	GMS Racing	Chevrolet	Race to End Suicide, Solar Fit
25	Toni Breidinger	Venturini Motorsports	Toyota	Triller
27	Alex Clubb	Richmond Clubb Motorsports	Ford	Richmond Clubb Motorsports
30	Kris Wright	Rette Jones Racing	Ford	Wright Automotive Group
35	Greg Van Alst	Greg Van Alst Motorsports	Ford	CB Fabrication
46	Thad Moffitt	David Gilliland Racing	Ford	Clean Harbors
48	Brad Smith	Brad Smith Motorsports	Chevrolet	Henshaw Automation
Official entry list

== Practice ==
The only 45-minute practice session was held on Saturday, July 31, at 4:15 PM EST. Corey Heim of Venturini Motorsports would set the fastest time in the session, with a lap of 16.043 and an average speed of 112.198 miles per hour (180.565 km/h).

Pos.	#	Driver	Team	Make	Time	Speed
1	20	Corey Heim	Venturini Motorsports	Toyota	16.043	112.198
2	18	Ty Gibbs	Joe Gibbs Racing	Toyota	16.127	111.614
3	2	Nick Sanchez	Rev Racing	Chevrolet	16.141	111.517
Full practice results

== Qualifying ==
Qualifying was held on Saturday, July 31, at 6:00 PM EST. Each driver would have two laps to set a fastest time- the fastest of the two would count as their official lap time. Corey Heim of Venturini Motorsports would win the pole, setting a time of 15.796 and an average speed of 113.953 miles per hour (183.390 km/h).

No drivers would fail to qualify.

=== Full qualifying results ===
Pos.	#	Driver	Team	Make	Time	Speed
1	20	Corey Heim	Venturini Motorsports	Toyota	15.796	113.953
2	18	Ty Gibbs	Joe Gibbs Racing	Toyota	15.901	113.200
3	2	Nick Sanchez	Rev Racing	Chevrolet	15.983	112.620
4	21	Daniel Dye	GMS Racing	Chevrolet	16.070	112.010
5	17	Taylor Gray	David Gilliland Racing	Ford	16.171	111.310
6	35	Greg Van Alst	Greg Van Alst Motorsports	Ford	16.374	109.930
7	15	Parker Chase	Venturini Motorsports	Toyota	16.384	109.863
8	30	Kris Wright	Rette Jones Racing	Ford	16.530	108.893
9	10	Brandon Varney	Fast Track Racing	Toyota	16.561	108.689
10	46	Thad Moffitt	David Gilliland Racing	Ford	16.633	108.219
11	11	Tony Cosentino	Fast Track Racing	Toyota	17.168	104.846
12	25	Toni Breidinger	Venturini Motorsports	Toyota	17.213	104.572
13	06	Zachary Tinkle	Wayne Peterson Racing	Ford	17.633	102.081
14	12	D. L. Wilson	Fast Track Racing	Chevrolet	18.458	97.519
15	48	Brad Smith	Brad Smith Motorsports	Chevrolet	18.675	96.386
16	27	Alex Clubb	Richmond Clubb Motorsports	Ford	19.286	93.332
17	01	Owen Smith	Fast Track Racing	Ford	19.434	92.621
Official qualifying results

== Race results ==
Fin	St	#	Driver	Team	Make	Laps	Led	Status	Pts
1	2	18	Ty Gibbs	Joe Gibbs Racing	Toyota	205	30	running	47
2	6	35	Greg Van Alst	Greg Van Alst Motorsports	Ford	205	0	running	42
3	1	20	Corey Heim	Venturini Motorsports	Toyota	205	175	running	44
4	10	46	Thad Moffitt	David Gilliland Racing	Ford	205	0	running	40
5	5	17	Taylor Gray	David Gilliland Racing	Ford	205	0	running	39
6	9	10	Brandon Varney	Fast Track Racing	Toyota	205	0	running	38
7	7	15	Parker Chase	Venturini Motorsports	Toyota	204	0	running	37
8	8	30	Kris Wright	Rette Jones Racing	Ford	204	0	running	36
9	12	25	Toni Breidinger	Venturini Motorsports	Toyota	201	0	running	35
10	11	11	Tony Cosentino	Fast Track Racing	Toyota	199	0	running	34
11	13	06	Zachary Tinkle	Wayne Peterson Racing	Ford	193	0	running	33
12	14	12	D. L. Wilson	Fast Track Racing	Chevrolet	123	0	brakes	32
13	4	21	Daniel Dye	GMS Racing	Chevrolet	84	0	accident	31
14	3	2	Nick Sanchez	Rev Racing	Chevrolet	84	0	accident	30
15	16	27	Alex Clubb	Richmond Clubb Motorsports	Ford	63	0	power steering	29
16	15	48	Brad Smith	Brad Smith Motorsports	Chevrolet	25	0	brakes	28
17	17	01	Owen Smith	Fast Track Racing	Ford	4	0	electrical	27
Official race results

Previous race: 2021 Shore Lunch 150	ARCA Menards Series; 2021 season	Next race: 2021 Clean Harbors 100 at The Glen
