= Brian Kaltreider =

American racing driver (born 1974)

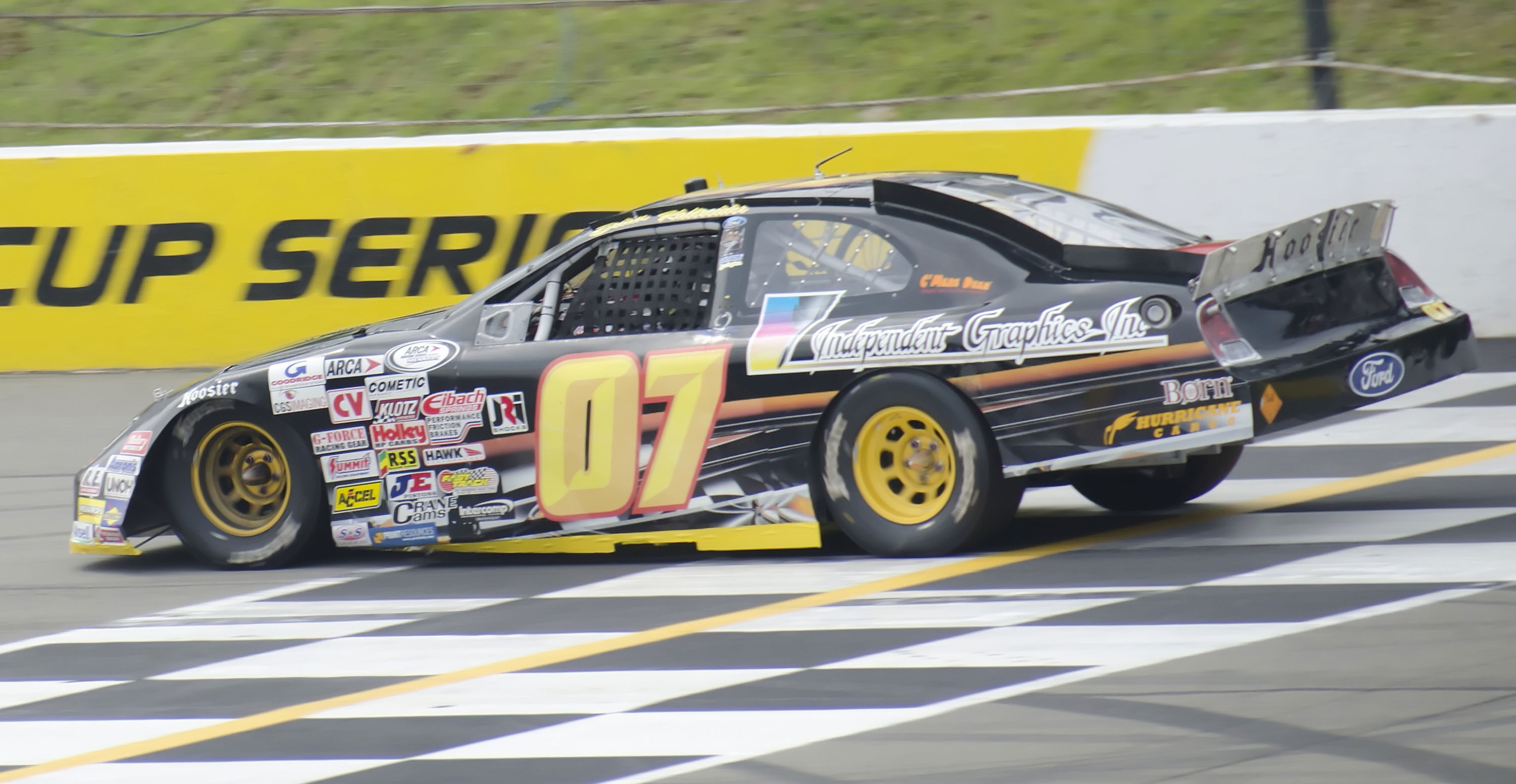
- Kaltreider's No. 07 car in the ARCA race at Pocono in August 2011
- Born: March 22, 1974 (age 52); Reading, Pennsylvania, U.S.

NASCAR FedEx Freight Truck Series career
- 1 race run over 1 year
- 2018 position: 78th
- Best finish: 78th (2018)
- First race: 2018 Overton's 225 (Chicagoland)
Wins	Top tens	Poles
0	0	0

ARCA Menards Series career
- 32 races run over 18 years
- Best finish: 72nd (2018)
- First race: 2001 EasyCare Vehicle Services Contracts 100 (Charlotte)
- Last race: 2022 General Tire 200 (Talladega)
Wins	Top tens	Poles
0	0	0

ARCA Menards Series West career
- 1 race run over 1 year
- Best finish: 71st (2022)
- First race: 2022 General Tire 150 (Phoenix)
Wins	Top tens	Poles
0	0	0
- Statistics up to date as of June 28, 2022.

Brian Kaltreider (born March 22, 1974) is an American professional stock car racing driver who last competed part-time in the ARCA Menards Series and the ARCA Menards Series West, driving the No. 07 Ford for his own team, Mystic Motorsports. He has also driven in the NASCAR Camping World Truck Series in the past.

== Racing career ==
=== NASCAR Camping World Truck Series ===
Kaltreider began his NASCAR career in 2018, driving the No. 50 Chevrolet Silverado for Beaver Motorsports at Chicagoland. He finished 25th after starting 30th.

=== ARCA Menards Series ===
Kaltreider first started racing in 2001, where he drove the No. 36 Ford for his own team at Charlotte, though failed to finish due to clutch problems. He kept racing on a part-time schedule throughout the years, normally at Pocono. On December 25, 2018, most of Kaltreider's equipment was destroyed in a shop fire. His cars were being updated for the 2019 ARCA Menards Series season (one by GMS Racing) but none of the losses were covered by insurance and only one legacy car was left.

On the 2022 Lucas Oil 200 entry list, it was revealed that Kaltreider would return after three years away from ARCA, for the first time since the 2018 shop fire mishap. It appeared that he and the team would attempt the full season as they attempted the first three races. However, at Talladega, the team suffered an engine failure and without a new engine, they have not been able to attempt any races since then.

=== ARCA Menards Series West ===
Kaltreider made his West Series debut in the 2022 General Tire 150, which was a combination race between the main ARCA Series and the West Series.

== Motorsports career results ==
=== NASCAR ===
(key) (Bold – Pole position awarded by qualifying time. Italics – Pole position earned by points standings or practice time. * – Most laps led.)

==== Camping World Truck Series ====
NASCAR Camping World Truck Series results
Year	Team	No.	Make	1	2	3	4	5	6	7	8	9	10	11	12	13	14	15	16	17	18	19	20	21	22	23	NCWTC	Pts	Ref
2018	Beaver Motorsports	50	Chevy	DAY	ATL	LVS	MAR	DOV	KAN	CLT	TEX	IOW	GTW	CHI; 25	KEN	ELD	POC	MCH	BRI	MSP	LVS	TAL	MAR	TEX	PHO	HOM	78th	12	

=== ARCA Menards Series ===
(key) (Bold – Pole position awarded by qualifying time. Italics – Pole position earned by points standings or practice time. * – Most laps led.)

ARCA Menards Series results
Year	Team	No.	Make	1	2	3	4	5	6	7	8	9	10	11	12	13	14	15	16	17	18	19	20	21	22	23	24	25	AMSC	Pts	Ref
2001	Mystic Motorsports	36	Ford	DAY	NSH	WIN	SLM	GTY	KEN	CLT	KAN	MCH	POC	MEM	GLN	KEN	MCH	POC	NSH	ISF	CHI	DSF	SLM	TOL	BLN	CLT; 38	TAL	ATL	184th	40	
2003	Mystic Motorsports	36	Ford	DAY	ATL	NSH	SLM	TOL	KEN	CLT	BLN	KAN	MCH	LER	POC; 15	POC; 29	NSH	ISF	WIN	DSF	CHI	SLM	TAL	CLT	SBO				105th	240	
2004	Mark Gibson Racing	56	Chevy	DAY	NSH	SLM	KEN	TOL	CLT	KAN	POC; 32	MCH	SBO	BLN	KEN	GTW	POC	LER	NSH	ISF	TOL	DSF	CHI	SLM	TAL				172nd	70	
2005	Mystic Motorsports	36	Ford	DAY	NSH	SLM	KEN	TOL	LAN	MIL	POC; 18	MCH	KAN	KEN	BLN	POC; 39	GTW	LER	NSH	MCH	ISF	TOL	DSF	CHI	SLM	TAL			112th	175	
2006	Mystic Motorsports	39	Ford	DAY	NSH	SLM	WIN	KEN	TOL	POC; 20	MCH	KAN	KEN	BLN	POC; 21	GTW	NSH												73rd	440	
2006	Mystic Motorsports	36	Ford															MCH; DNQ	ISF	MIL	TOL	DSF							73rd	440	
2006	Bob Aiello	62	Ford																				CHI; 41	SLM	TAL; 20	IOW			73rd	440	
2007	Mystic Motorsports	36	Ford	DAY	USA	NSH	SLM	KAN	WIN	KEN	TOL	IOW	POC	MCH	BLN	KEN	POC; DNQ	NSH	ISF	MIL	GTW	DSF							N/A	0	
2007	Mystic Motorsports	94	Ford																				CHI; DNQ	SLM	TAL	TOL			N/A	0	
2008	Mystic Motorsports	94	Ford	DAY	SLM	IOW	KAN	CAR	KEN	TOL	POC; 14	MCH; 38	CAY	KEN	BLN														86th	225	
2008	Mystic Motorsports	36	Ford													POC; DNQ	NSH	ISF	DSF	CHI	SLM	NJM	TAL	TOL					86th	225	
2009	Mystic Motorsports	7	Ford	DAY	SLM	CAR	TAL	KEN	TOL	POC; 20	MCH	MFD	IOW	KEN	BLN	POC; 28	ISF	CHI	TOL	DSF	NJM	SLM	KAN	CAR					99th	220	
2010	Mystic Motorsports	7	Ford	DAY	PBE	SLM	TEX	TAL	TOL	POC	MCH	IOW	MFD	POC; 23	BLN	NJM	ISF	CHI	DSF	TOL	SLM	KAN	CAR						114th	115	
2011	Mystic Motorsports	07	Ford	DAY	TAL	SLM	TOL	NJM	CHI	POC; 25	MCH	WIN	BLN	IOW	IRP	POC; 17	ISF	MAD	DSF	SLM	KAN	TOL							78th	250	
2012	Mystic Motorsports	07	Ford	DAY	MOB	SLM	TAL	TOL	ELK	POC; 20	MCH	WIN	NJM	IOW	CHI	IRP	POC; 22	BLN	ISF	MAD	SLM	DSF	KAN						78th	250	
2013	Mystic Motorsports	07	Ford	DAY	MOB	SLM	TAL	TOL	ELK	POC; 15	MCH	ROA	WIN	CHI	NJM	POC; 18	BLN	ISF	MAD	DSF	IOW	SLM	KEN	KAN					79th	295	
2014	Mystic Motorsports	07	Ford	DAY	MOB	SLM	TAL	TOL	NJM	POC	MCH	ELK	WIN	CHI	IRP	POC; 21	BLN	ISF	MAD	DSF	SLM	KEN	KAN						118th	125	
2015	Mystic Motorsports	07	Ford	DAY	MOB	NSH	SLM	TAL	TOL	NJM	POC; 34	MCH	CHI	WIN	IOW	IRP	POC; 22	BLN	ISF	DSF	SLM	KEN	KAN						97th	180	
2016	Mystic Motorsports	07	Ford	DAY	NSH	SLM	TAL	TOL	NJM	POC; 22	MCH	MAD	WIN	IOW	IRP	POC; 14	BLN	ISF	DSF	SLM	CHI	KEN	KAN						79th	280	
2017	Mystic Motorsports	07	Ford	DAY	NSH	SLM	TAL	TOL	ELK	POC	MCH	MAD	IOW	IRP	POC; 23	WIN	ISF	ROA	DSF	SLM	CHI	KEN	KAN						107th	115	
2018	Mystic Motorsports	07	Ford	DAY	NSH	SLM	TAL	TOL	CLT	POC; 26	MCH	MAD	GTW	CHI	IOW	ELK	POC; 17	ISF	BLN	DSF	SLM	IRP	KAN						72nd	245	
2022	Mystic Motorsports	07	Ford	DAY; 27	PHO; 37	TAL; 32	KAN	CLT	IOW	BLN	ELK	MOH	POC	IRP	MCH	GLN	ISF	MLW	DSF	KAN	BRI	SLM	TOL						79th	36	

==== ARCA Menards Series West ====
ARCA Menards Series West results
Year	Team	No.	Make	1	2	3	4	5	6	7	8	9	10	11	AMSWC	Pts	Ref
2022	Mystic Motorsports	07	Ford	PHO; 37	IRW	KCR	PIR	SON	IRW	EVG	PIR	AAS	LVS	PHO	71st	7	
