= 2021 Henry Ford Health System 200 =

Race details
- Race 14 of 20 of the 2021 ARCA Menards Series
- Date: August 20, 2021
- Official name: 33rd Annual Henry Ford Health System 200
- Location: Brooklyn, Michigan, Michigan International Speedway
- Course: Permanent racing facility
- Course length: 2.0 miles (3.2 km)
- Distance: 100 laps, 200 mi (321.869 km)
- Scheduled distance: 100 laps, 200 mi (321.869 km)
- Average speed: 117.264 miles per hour (188.718 km/h)

Pole position
Driver	Ty Gibbs	Joe Gibbs Racing
- Time: Set by 2021 owner's points

Most laps led
Driver	Ty Gibbs	Joe Gibbs Racing
- Laps: 99

Winner
No. 18	Ty Gibbs	Joe Gibbs Racing

Television in the United States
- Network: MAVTV
- Announcers: Bob Dillner, Jim Trebow

Radio in the United States
- Radio: Motor Racing Network

The 2021 Henry Ford Health System 200 was the 14th stock car race of the 2021 ARCA Menards Series season and 33rd iteration of the event. The race was held on Friday, August 20, 2021, in Brooklyn, Michigan at Michigan International Speedway, a two-mile (3.2 km) moderate-banked D-shaped speedway. The race took the scheduled 100 laps to complete. At race's end, Ty Gibbs of Joe Gibbs Racing would dominate the race and win his 16th career ARCA Menards Series win and his eighth of the season. To fill out the podium, Corey Heim of Venturini Motorsports and Nick Sanchez of Rev Racing would finish second and third, respectively.

== Background ==
The race was held at Michigan International Speedway, a two-mile (3.2 km) moderate-banked D-shaped speedway located in Brooklyn, Michigan. The track is used primarily for NASCAR events. It is known as a "sister track" to Texas World Speedway as MIS's oval design was a direct basis of TWS, with moderate modifications to the banking in the corners, and was used as the basis of Auto Club Speedway. The track is owned by International Speedway Corporation. Michigan International Speedway is recognized as one of motorsports' premier facilities because of its wide racing surface and high banking (by open-wheel standards; the 18-degree banking is modest by stock car standards).

=== Entry list ===
#	Driver	Team	Make	Sponsor
01	Tony Cosentino	Fast Track Racing	Chevrolet	Fast Track Racing
2	Nick Sanchez	Rev Racing	Chevrolet	Max Siegel Incorporated
02	Connor Mosack	Young's Motorsports	Chevrolet	Nic Tailor Custom Fit Underwear
06	Zachary Tinkle	Wayne Peterson Racing	Ford	Great Railing
10	Morgen Baird	Fast Track Racing	Toyota	Founders Brewing Company, Recruit Personalized Staffing
11	Brandon Varney	Fast Track Racing	Toyota	Richmond Home Furnishings, Van's Tire Center
12	D. L. Wilson	Fast Track Racing	Chevrolet	Tradinghouse Bar & Grill
15	Drew Dollar	Venturini Motorsports	Toyota	Sunbelt Rentals
18	Ty Gibbs	Joe Gibbs Racing	Toyota	Joe Gibbs Racing
20	Corey Heim	Venturini Motorsports	Toyota	JBL
23	Sam Mayer	Bret Holmes Racing	Chevrolet	QPS Employment Group
25	Gracie Trotter	Venturini Motorsports	Toyota	Mobil 1
27	Tim Richmond	Richmond Clubb Motorsports	Chevrolet	Richmond Clubb Motorsports
28	Kyle Sieg	RSS Racing	Chevrolet	Chubby Charlie's Pizza "Don't just eat pizza, enjoy it!"
35	Greg Van Alst	Greg Van Alst Motorsports	Ford	CB Fabricating
46	Thad Moffitt	David Gilliland Racing	Ford	Clean Harbors
48	Brad Smith	Brad Smith Motorsports	Chevrolet	Henshaw Automation
65	Jeffery MacZink	MacZink Racing	Toyota	Parkway Services, Inc., Syncon Performance Flooring
69	Scott Melton	Kimmel Racing	Toyota	Melton-McFadden Insurance Agency
97	Jason Kitzmiller	CR7 Motorsports	Chevrolet	A. L. L. Construction
Official entry list

== Starting lineup ==
No qualifying was scheduled for the event. The starting lineup was instead determined by car owner points for the 2021 season and provisionals. As a result, Ty Gibbs of Joe Gibbs Racing won the pole.

Pos.	#	Driver	Team	Make
1	18	Ty Gibbs	Joe Gibbs Racing	Toyota
2	20	Corey Heim	Venturini Motorsports	Toyota
3	15	Drew Dollar	Venturini Motorsports	Toyota
4	46	Thad Moffitt	David Gilliland Racing	Ford
5	2	Nick Sanchez	Rev Racing	Chevrolet
6	25	Gracie Trotter	Venturini Motorsports	Toyota
7	10	Morgen Baird	Fast Track Racing	Toyota
8	27	Tim Richmond	Richmond Clubb Motorsports	Chevrolet
9	11	Brandon Varney	Fast Track Racing	Toyota
10	12	D. L. Wilson	Fast Track Racing	Chevrolet
11	01	Tony Cosentino	Fast Track Racing	Chevrolet
12	48	Brad Smith	Brad Smith Motorsports	Chevrolet
13	28	Kyle Sieg	RSS Racing	Chevrolet
14	06	Zachary Tinkle	Wayne Peterson Racing	Ford
15	23	Sam Mayer	Bret Holmes Racing	Chevrolet
16	69	Scott Melton	Kimmel Racing	Toyota
17	02	Connor Mosack	Young's Motorsports	Chevrolet
18	35	Greg Van Alst	Greg Van Alst Motorsports	Ford
19	97	Jason Kitzmiller	CR7 Motorsports	Chevrolet
20	65	Jeffery MacZink	MacZink Racing	Toyota
Official starting lineup

== Race results ==
Fin	St	#	Driver	Team	Make	Laps	Led	Status	Pts
1	1	18	Ty Gibbs	Joe Gibbs Racing	Toyota	100	99	running	48
2	2	20	Corey Heim	Venturini Motorsports	Toyota	100	1	running	43
3	5	2	Nick Sanchez	Rev Racing	Chevrolet	100	0	running	41
4	15	23	Sam Mayer	Bret Holmes Racing	Chevrolet	100	0	running	40
5	13	28	Kyle Sieg	RSS Racing	Chevrolet	100	0	running	39
6	18	35	Greg Van Alst	Greg Van Alst Motorsports	Ford	100	0	running	38
7	7	10	Morgen Baird	Fast Track Racing	Toyota	100	0	running	37
8	4	46	Thad Moffitt	David Gilliland Racing	Ford	98	0	running	36
9	20	65	Jeffery MacZink	MacZink Racing	Toyota	96	0	running	35
10	9	11	Brandon Varney	Fast Track Racing	Toyota	95	0	running	34
11	12	48	Brad Smith	Brad Smith Motorsports	Chevrolet	86	0	running	33
12	19	97	Jason Kitzmiller	CR7 Motorsports	Chevrolet	75	0	accident	32
13	6	25	Gracie Trotter	Venturini Motorsports	Toyota	74	0	accident	31
14	16	69	Scott Melton	Kimmel Racing	Toyota	47	0	oil leak	30
15	14	06	Zachary Tinkle	Wayne Peterson Racing	Ford	42	0	oil leak	29
16	17	02	Connor Mosack	Young's Motorsports	Chevrolet	33	0	fuel pump	28
17	8	27	Tim Richmond	Richmond Clubb Motorsports	Chevrolet	20	0	accident	27
18	3	15	Drew Dollar	Venturini Motorsports	Toyota	18	0	accident	26
19	10	12	D. L. Wilson	Fast Track Racing	Chevrolet	8	0	oil line	25
20	11	01	Tony Cosentino	Fast Track Racing	Chevrolet	0	0	fuel pump	24
Official race results

Previous race: 2021 Clean Harbors 100 at The Glen	ARCA Menards Series; 2021 season	Next race: 2021 Allen Crowe 100
