= Kyle Lockrow =

American racing driver

- Born: May 5, 1990 (age 36); La Plata, Maryland, U.S.

ARCA Menards Series career
- 1 race run over 1 year
- Best finish: 106th (2021)
- First race: 2021 Reese's 150 (Kansas)
Wins	Top tens	Poles
0	0	0
- Statistics up to date as of February 4, 2025.

Kyle Lockrow (born May 5, 1990) is an American professional stock car racing driver who has competed in the ARCA Menards Series.

Lockrow has also previously competed in the NASCAR Advance Auto Parts Weekly Series.

== Motorsports results ==
=== ARCA Menards Series ===
(key) (Bold – Pole position awarded by qualifying time. Italics – Pole position earned by points standings or practice time. * – Most laps led.)

ARCA Menards Series results
Year	Team	No.	Make	1	2	3	4	5	6	7	8	9	10	11	12	13	14	15	16	17	18	19	20	AMSC	Pts	Ref
2021	Vanco Racing	66	Ford	DAY	PHO	TAL	KAN	TOL	CLT	MOH	POC	ELK	BLN	IOW	WIN	GLN	MCH	ISF	MLW	DSF	BRI	SLM	KAN; 21	106th	23	
