= Parker Chase =

American racing driver

- Nationality: (United States) American
- Born: Parker B. Chase; February 22, 2001 (age 25) New Braunfels, Texas, U.S.

Michelin Pilot Challenge career
- Debut season: 2017
- Current team: Bryan Herta Autosport
- Categorisation: FIA Silver
- Car number: 98
- Co-driver: Ryan Norman
- Starts: 11
- Best finish: 6th in 2020
- Finished last season: 6th

NASCAR O'Reilly Auto Parts Series career
- 8 races run over 2 years
- 2023 position: 42nd
- Best finish: 42nd (2023)
- First race: 2022 Pit Boss 250 (Austin)
- Last race: 2023 Andy's Frozen Custard 300 (Texas)
Wins	Top tens	Poles
0	0	0

NASCAR FedEx Freight Truck Series career
- 2 races run over 1 year
- 2021 position: 57th
- Best finish: 57th (2021)
- First race: 2021 BrakeBest Select 159 (Daytona RC)
- Last race: 2021 Toyota Tundra 225 (Austin)
Wins	Top tens	Poles
0	0	0

ARCA Menards Series career
- 14 races run over 3 years
- Best finish: 15th (2022)
- First race: 2020 General Tire 100 (Daytona RC)
- Last race: 2022 Dawn 150 (Mid-Ohio)
Wins	Top tens	Poles
0	8	0

ARCA Menards Series East career
- 2 races run over 2 years
- Best finish: 38th (2021)
- First race: 2021 Bush's Beans 200 (Bristol)
Wins	Top tens	Poles
0	2	0

ARCA Menards Series West career
- 3 races run over 2 years
- Best finish: 30th (2022)
- First race: 2021 Arizona Lottery 100 (Phoenix)
- Last race: 2022 General Tire 150 (Phoenix)
Wins	Top tens	Poles
0	1	0

WeatherTech SportsCar Championship career
- Debut season: 2017
- Former teams: AIM Vasser Sullivan
- Starts: 9
- Championships: 0
- Wins: 0
- Podiums: 0
- Poles: 0
- Best finish: 19th in 2019
- Finished last season: 50th (2020)

Previous series
- 2020: ARCA Menards Series

Championship titles
- 2018: Pirelli World Challenge SprintX GT Pro/Am
- Statistics up to date as of December 30, 2024.

Parker B. Chase (born February 22, 2001) is an American professional racing driver who competes full-time in the International Motor Sports Association (IMSA) Michelin Pilot Challenge and driving the No. 98 Hyundai Veloster N TCR for Bryan Herta Autosport. He has experience in sports car and stock car racing, including racing in the IMSA WeatherTech SportsCar Championship, NASCAR Xfinity Series, NASCAR Camping World Truck Series, and ARCA Menards Series.

== Racing career ==
In 2011, Chase begun his racing career driving go-karts at the age of ten in his hometown of New Braunfels, Texas. The next year, Chase would enter the 2012 Florida Winter Tour, finishing 38th in the event.

In 2013, Chase entered the Rotax Max Challenge Grand finals where he would finish in 25th. In 2014, Chase entered the SKUSA SuperNationals XVIII, where he would finish in 45th.

In 2015, Chase would stray away from go-karts, driving a Mazda MX-5 Miata in the NASA Eastern States Championships for one race, finishing twelfth. Chase would then join Chastain Motorsports in the F1600 Formula F Championship Series for ten races. At Road Atlanta, he finished eleventh twice in a row before finishing eighth. A month later at Watkins Glen, Chase would finish 15th, 17th, and then 16th. Another month later, Formula F raced three times at Virginia International Raceway, where he would finish thirteenth, eighteenth, and eleventh. Chase also attempted another Florida Winter Tour, this time finishing 39th.

In 2016, Chase would join Performance Motorsports Group in the Pirelli World Challenge for the whole season. The season started well for Chase finishing on the podium at the Circuit of the Americas, before finishing fifth on the same track a day later. Throughout the season, Chase would rack up six podiums, three of them being second-place finishes. He would finish fourth in the overall standings. He also raced in the Global RallyCross Championship Lites division for PMG until the team sold his car to DirtFish Motorsports.

Chase would return to the Performance Motorsports Group for ten races in 2017, getting a podium in four races, getting second place in both races at the Circuit of the Americas. Later that year, Chase joined Century Motorsport in the British GT Championship for two races. He would also make his debut in the WeatherTech SportsCar Championship at Circuit of the Americas, driving a Porsche for The Motorsports Group alongside driver Harry Gottsacker. The pair would finish 29th, a lap behind the leaders. In 2018, Chase would join TruSpeed AutoSport in two different Pirelli World Challenge series, winning six races between the two and coming home with a championship.

The next year, Chase would enter the Pirelli GT4 American East this time with RENNtech Motorsports, where he raced only two races at Circuit of the Americas, where he finished second both times. He also entered the WeatherTech SportsCar Championship driving for Starworks Motorsport in six races and AIM Vasser Sullivan for one race. During the season, Chase would enter his first 24 Hours at Daytona event, teaming up with drivers Ryan Dalziel, Ezequiel Perez Companc, and Christopher Haase towards a thirteenth place finish in their class. At Sebring, Chase, Companc, and Dalziel would team up again, finishing the race 34th overall. In the next five races that Chase participated in, he would team up with Dalziel. However, at Watkins Glen Mike Skeen joined the duo for a single race, helping them towards a finish of 29th overall. At Road Atlanta, Chase joined AIM Vasser Sullivan for a single race, teaming up with drivers Jack Hawksworth and Richard Heistand towards an overall finish of 28th.

Chase would stay with AIM Vasser Sullivan in 2020, racing in the 24 Hours of Daytona alongside Hawksworth, Michael de Quesada, and Kyle Busch. They would finish 9th in their class and 26th overall. In June, he signed with Bryan Herta Autosport for the Michelin Pilot Challenge season, driving the No. 29 Hyundai Veloster N TCR alongside Spencer Brockman. Chase began competing in stock cars in August when he ran the ARCA Menards Series race on the Daytona road course for Chad Bryant Racing and in late models in North Carolina.

In 2021, Chase moved to Herta's No. 98, sharing the car with MPC TCR champion Ryan Norman. He also joined Kyle Busch Motorsports for a two-race NASCAR Camping World Truck Series schedule on Daytona's road course and at Circuit of the Americas.

== Motorsports career results ==
=== NASCAR ===
(key) (Bold – Pole position awarded by qualifying time. Italics – Pole position earned by points standings or practice time. * – Most laps led.)

==== Xfinity Series ====
NASCAR Xfinity Series results
Year	Team	No.	Make	1	2	3	4	5	6	7	8	9	10	11	12	13	14	15	16	17	18	19	20	21	22	23	24	25	26	27	28	29	30	31	32	33	NXSC	Pts	Ref
2022	Sam Hunt Racing	26	Toyota	DAY	CAL	LVS	PHO	ATL	COA; 19	RCH	MAR	TAL	DOV	DAR	TEX	CLT	PIR; 27	NSH	ROA	ATL	NHA	POC	IND	MCH	GLN	DAY	DAR	KAN	BRI	TEX	TAL	CLT	LVS	HOM	MAR	PHO	55th	31	
2023	Sam Hunt Racing	24	Toyota	DAY; 16	CAL	LVS	PHO	ATL				TAL; 38	DOV	DAR	CLT				CSC; 16	ATL; 27	NHA	POC	ROA	MCH	IRC	GLN	DAY	DAR	KAN	BRI	TEX; 16	ROV	LVS	HOM	MAR	PHO	42nd	76	
2023	Emerling-Gase Motorsports	35	Toyota						COA; DNQ	RCH	MAR					PIR; 35	SON	NSH																			42nd	76	

==== Camping World Truck Series ====
NASCAR Camping World Truck Series results
Year	Team	No.	Make	1	2	3	4	5	6	7	8	9	10	11	12	13	14	15	16	17	18	19	20	21	22	NCWTC	Pts	Ref
2021	Kyle Busch Motorsports	51	Toyota	DAY	DAY; 23	LVS	ATL	BRI	RCH	KAN	DAR	COA; 18	CLT	TEX	NSH	POC	KNX	GLN	GTW	DAR	BRI	LVS	TAL	MAR	PHO	57th	33	

^{*} Season in progress
^{1} Ineligible for series points

=== ARCA Menards Series ===
(key) (Bold – Pole position awarded by qualifying time. Italics – Pole position earned by points standings or practice time. * – Most laps led.)

ARCA Menards Series results
Year	Team	No.	Make	1	2	3	4	5	6	7	8	9	10	11	12	13	14	15	16	17	18	19	20	AMSC	Pts	Ref
2020	Chad Bryant Racing	22	Ford	DAY	PHO	TAL	POC	IRP	KEN	IOW	KAN	TOL	TOL	MCH	DAY; 10	GTW	L44	TOL	BRI	WIN	MEM	ISF	KAN	59th	34	
2021	Venturini Motorsports	25	Toyota	DAY	PHO	TAL	KAN	TOL	CLT; 4	MOH	POC	ELK	BLN	IOW	WIN; 7	GLN	MCH	ISF	MLW	DSF		SLM	KAN; 10	28th	146	
2021	Venturini Motorsports	55	Toyota																		BRI; 9			28th	146	
2022	Venturini Motorsports	15	Toyota	DAY; 2	PHO; 20	TAL; 9	KAN	CLT; 15	IOW	BLN	ELK	MOH; 2	POC; 18	IRP	MCH	GLN; 6	ISF	MLW	DSF	KAN; 6	BRI; 6	SLM	TOL	15th	313	

==== ARCA Menards Series East ====
ARCA Menards Series East results
Year	Team	No.	Make	1	2	3	4	5	6	7	8	AMSEC	Pts	Ref
2021	Venturini Motorsports	55	Toyota	NSM	FIF	NSV	DOV	SNM	IOW	MLW	BRI; 9	38th	35	
2022	Venturini Motorsports	15	Toyota	NSM	FIF	DOV	NSV	IOW	MLW	BRI; 6		41st	38	

==== ARCA Menards Series West ====
ARCA Menards Series West results
Year	Team	No.	Make	1	2	3	4	5	6	7	8	9	10	11	AMSWC	Pts	Ref
2021	Venturini Motorsports	25	Toyota	PHO	SON	IRW	CNS	IRW	PIR	LVS	AAS	PHO; 13			53rd	31	
2022	Venturini Motorsports	15	Toyota	PHO; 20	IRW	KCR	PIR	SON	IRW	EVG	PIR	AAS	LVS	PHO; 8	30th	110	

=== Complete IMSA SportsCar Championship results ===
(key) (Races in bold indicate pole position) (Races in italics indicate fastest lap)

Year	Team	Class	Make	Engine	1	2	3	4	5	6	7	8	9	10	11	12	Pos.	Pts
2017	TRG	GTD	Porsche 911 GT3 R	Porsche 4.0 L Flat-6	DAY	SEB	LBH	AUS; 16	BEL	WGL	MOS	LIM	ELK	VIR	LGA	PET	75th	15
2019	Starworks Motorsport	GTD	Audi R8 LMS Evo	Audi 5.2 L V10	DAY; 13	SEB; 14	MOH; 9	DET; 6	WGL; 12	MOS	LIM	ELK; 10	VIR	LGA			19th	119
2019	AIM Vasser Sullivan	GTD	Lexus RC F GT3	Lexus 5.0 L V8	DAY	SEB	MOH	DET	WGL	MOS	LIM	ELK	VIR	LGA	PET; 9		19th	119
2020	AIM Vasser Sullivan	GTD	Lexus RC F GT3	Lexus 5.0 L V8	DAY; 9	DAY	SEB	ELK	VIR	ATL	MOH	CLT	PET	LGA	SEB		36th	43

=== 24 Hours of Daytona ===
Year	Team	Co-drivers	Car	Class	Laps	Pos.	Class Pos.
2019	(United States) Starworks Motorsport	(United Kingdom) Ryan Dalziel (Argentina) Ezequiel Perez Companc (Germany) Christopher Haase	Audi R8 LMS GT3	GTD	547	33rd	13th
2020	(Canada) AIM Vasser Sullivan	(United States) Michael de Quesada (United Kingdom) Jack Hawksworth (United States) Kyle Busch	Lexus RCF GT3	GTD	757	26th	9th
