= 2022 Lucas Oil 200 =

First race of the 2022 ARCA Menards Series

2022 Lucas Oil 200 Driven by General Tire
Race details
- Race 1 of 20 of the 2022 ARCA Menards Series
- Date: February 19, 2022
- Official name: Lucas Oil 200 Driven by General Tire
- Location: Daytona Beach, Florida, Daytona International Speedway
- Course: Permanent racing facility
- Course length: 2.5 miles (4 km)
- Distance: 80 laps, 200 mi (321.84 km)
- Scheduled distance: 80 laps, 200 mi (321.84 km)
- Average speed: 126.783 mph (204.037 km/h)

Pole position
Driver	Corey Heim	Venturini Motorsports
- Time: 49.150

Most laps led
Driver	Corey Heim	Venturini Motorsports
- Laps: 74

Winner
No. 20	Corey Heim	Venturini Motorsports

Television in the United States
- Network: Fox Sports 1
- Announcers: Jamie Little, Chase Briscoe, Phil Parsons

Radio in the United States
- Radio: Motor Racing Network

The 2022 Lucas Oil 200 Driven by General Tire was the first stock car race of the 2022 ARCA Menards Series season and was the 59th iteration of the event. The race was held on Saturday, February 19, 2022, in Daytona Beach, Florida at Daytona International Speedway, a 2.5 mile (4 km) permanent asphalt superspeedway. The race was run over 80 laps. Corey Heim of Venturini Motorsports would win the race after leading the most laps. This was Heim's eighth career ARCA Menards Series win, and his third superspeedway win.

== Background ==
Daytona International Speedway is one of three superspeedways to hold NASCAR races, the other two being Indianapolis Motor Speedway and Talladega Superspeedway. The standard track at Daytona International Speedway is a four-turn superspeedway that is 2.5 miles (4.0 km) long. The track's turns are banked at 31 degrees, while the front stretch, the location of the finish line, is banked at 18 degrees.

=== Entry list ===
#	Driver	Team	Make	Sponsor
0	Con Nicolopoulos	Wayne Peterson Racing	Chevrolet	Grateful Rescue, GreatRailing.com
01	Benny Chastain	Fast Track Racing	Ford	Fast Track High Performance Driving School
02	Chuck Walker	Young's Motorsports	Chevrolet	Young's Motorsports
2	Nick Sanchez	Rev Racing	Chevrolet	Rev Racing
03	Brayton Laster	Mullins Racing	Ford	Indy Auto Recyclers
3	Willie Mullins	Mullins Racing	Chevrolet	CorvetteParts.net, Crow Wing Recycling
5	Dale Quarterley	Bobby Gerhart Racing	Chevrolet	Van Dyk Recycling Solutions
06	Zachary Tinkle	Wayne Peterson Racing	Ford	GreatRailing.com
6	Rajah Caruth (R)	Rev Racing	Chevrolet	Rev Racing
07	Brian Kaltreider	Kaltreider Motorsports	Ford	Kaltreider Motorsports
7	Eric Caudell	CCM Racing	Ford	Red Tide Canopies, Coble Enterprises
10	Jason White	Fast Track Racing	Chevrolet	Powder Ventures Excavations
11	Chuck Hiers	Fast Track Racing	Toyota	Ashley Homes
12	D. L. Wilson	Fast Track Racing	Chevrolet	Tradinghouse Bar & Grill
15	Parker Chase	Venturini Motorsports	Toyota	Vertical Bridge
18	Drew Dollar	Kyle Busch Motorsports	Toyota	Lynx Capitol
20	Corey Heim	Venturini Motorsports	Toyota	Crescent Tools
25	Toni Breidinger (R)	Venturini Motorsports	Toyota	Venturini Motorsports
27	Tim Richmond	Richmond Motorsports	Toyota	Immigration Law Center
29 (Note: The team ran the #29 in honor of Bob Keselowski.)	Sean Corr	Empire Racing	Chevrolet	NESCO, Winnebago
30	Amber Balcaen (R)	Rette Jones Racing	Ford	ICON Direct
32	Max Gutiérrez	AM Racing	Chevrolet	Tough Built
35	Greg Van Alst	Greg Van Alst Motorsports	Chevrolet	CB Fabricating
36	Ryan Huff	Huff Racing	Ford	H&H Excavation, South Eastern Services
42	Christian Rose	Cook Racing Technologies	Chevrolet	Visit West Virginia
43	Daniel Dye (R)	GMS Racing	Chevrolet	GMS Racing
44	Mason Diaz	Ferrier-McClure Racing	Chevrolet	Solid Rock Carriers, Prince William Marina
48	Brad Smith	Brad Smith Motorsports	Chevrolet	PSST... Copraya Websites
55	Gus Dean	Venturini Motorsports	Toyota	Venturini Motorsports
57	Bryan Dauzat	Brother-in-Law Racing	Chevrolet	Brother-in-Law Racing
60	Michael Lira	Josh Williams Motorsports	Ford	Josh Williams Motorsports
63	Dave Mader III	Spraker Racing Enterprises	Chevrolet	Diamond C Ranch, PBW LLC
68	Will Kimmel	Kimmel Racing	Ford	E3 Spark Plugs
69	Scott Melton	Kimmel Racing	Ford	Melton McFadden Insurance Agency
73	Andy Jankowiak	Jankowiak Motorsports	Ford	Jankowiak Motorsports
94	Bryce Haugeberg	Haugeberg Racing	Toyota	Magnum Contracting
97	Jason Kitzmiller	CR7 Motorsports	Chevrolet	A. L. L. Construction
Official entry list

== Practice ==
=== First and final practice ===
Toni Breidinger was fastest in practice with a time of 49.170 seconds and a speed of 183.038 mph (294.571 km/h).

Pos	No.	Driver	Team	Manufacturer	Time	Speed
1	25	Toni Breidinger (R)	Venturini Motorsports	Toyota	49.170	183.038
2	15	Parker Chase	Venturini Motorsports	Toyota	49.205	182.908
3	20	Corey Heim	Venturini Motorsports	Toyota	49.216	182.867
Full practice results

== Qualifying ==
Corey Heim scored the pole for the race with a time of 49.150 seconds and a speed of 183.113 mph (294.692 km/h).

Pos.	#	Driver	Team	Make	Time	Speed
1	20	Corey Heim	Venturini Motorsports	Toyota	49.150	183.113
2	55	Gus Dean	Venturini Motorsports	Toyota	49.163	183.064
3	15	Parker Chase	Venturini Motorsports	Toyota	49.172	183.031
4	44	Mason Diaz	Ferrier-McClure Racing	Chevrolet	49.178	183.009
5	29	Sean Corr	Empire Racing	Chevrolet	49.195	182.945
6	35	Greg Van Alst	Greg Van Alst Motorsports	Chevrolet	49.723	181.003
7	27	Tim Richmond	Richmond Motorsports	Toyota	49.730	180.977
8	3	Willie Mullins	Mullins Racing	Ford	49.733	180.966
9	11	Chuck Hiers	Fast Track Racing	Toyota	49.735	180.959
10	18	Drew Dollar	Kyle Busch Motorsports	Toyota	49.735	180.959
11	25	Toni Breidinger (R)	Venturini Motorsports	Toyota	49.737	180.952
12	73	Andy Jankowiak	Jankowiak Motorsports	Ford	49.786	180.774
13	97	Jason Kitzmiller	CR7 Motorsports	Chevrolet	49.808	180.694
14	43	Daniel Dye (R)	GMS Racing	Chevrolet	49.821	180.647
15	5	Dale Quarterley	Bobby Gerhart Racing	Chevrolet	50.097	179.651
16	57	Bryan Dauzat	Brother-in-Law Racing	Chevrolet	50.346	178.763
17	03	Brayton Laster	Mullins Racing	Ford	50.354	178.735
18	60	Michael Lira	Josh Williams Motorsports	Ford	50.359	178.717
19	32	Max Gutiérrez	AM Racing	Chevrolet	50.360	178.713
20	42	Christian Rose	Cook Racing Technologies	Chevrolet	50.364	178.699
21	6	Rajah Caruth (R)	Rev Racing	Chevrolet	50.370	178.678
22	30	Amber Balcaen (R)	Rette Jones Racing	Ford	50.380	178.642
23	2	Nick Sanchez	Rev Racing	Chevrolet	50.512	178.175
24	63	Dave Mader III	Spraker Racing Enterprises	Chevrolet	50.547	178.052
25	10	Jason White	Fast Track Racing	Chevrolet	50.557	178.017
26	36	Ryan Huff	Huff Racing	Ford	50.781	177.232
27	68	Will Kimmel	Kimmel Racing	Ford	50.989	176.509
28	7	Eric Caudell	CCM Racing	Ford	51.326	175.350
29	12	D. L. Wilson	Fast Track Racing	Chevrolet	51.440	174.961
30	69	Scott Melton	Kimmel Racing	Ford	52.115	172.695
31	94	Bryce Haugeberg	Haugeberg Racing	Toyota	52.675	170.859
32	06	Zachary Tinkle	Wayne Peterson Racing	Chevrolet	53.838	167.168
33	0	Con Nicolopoulos	Wayne Peterson Racing	Ford	54.681	164.591
34	48	Brad Smith	Brad Smith Motorsports	Chevrolet	54.754	164.372
35	07	Brian Kaltreider	Kaltreider Motorsports	Ford	56.315	159.815
36	01	Benny Chastain	Fast Track Racing	Ford	-	-
Withdrew
37	02	Chuck Walker	Young's Motorsports	Chevrolet	-	-
Full qualifying results

== Race results ==
Fin	St	#	Driver	Team	Make	Laps	Led	Status	Pts
1	1	20	Corey Heim	Venturini Motorsports	Toyota	80	74	Running	49
2	3	15	Parker Chase	Venturini Motorsports	Toyota	80	0	Running	42
3	14	43	Daniel Dye (R)	GMS Racing	Chevrolet	80	0	Running	41
4	5	29	Sean Corr	Empire Racing	Chevrolet	80	6	Running	41
5	2	55	Gus Dean	Venturini Motorsports	Toyota	80	0	Running	39
6	12	73	Andy Jankowiak	Jankowiak Motorsports	Ford	80	0	Running	38
7	4	44	Mason Diaz	Ferrier-McClure Racing	Chevrolet	80	0	Running	37
8	24	63	Dave Mader III	Spraker Racing Enterprises	Chevrolet	80	0	Running	36
9	11	25	Toni Breidinger (R)	Venturini Motorsports	Toyota	80	0	Running	35
10	26	36	Ryan Huff	Huff Racing	Ford	80	0	Running	34
11	21	6	Rajah Caruth (R)	Rev Racing	Chevrolet	80	0	Running	33
12	15	5	Dale Quarterley	Bobby Gerhart Racing	Chevrolet	80	0	Running	32
13	17	03	Brayton Laster	Mullins Racing	Ford	80	0	Running	31
14	8	3	Willie Mullins	Mullins Racing	Ford	80	0	Running	30
15	10	11	Chuck Hiers	Fast Track Racing	Toyota	80	0	Running	29
16	22	30	Amber Balcaen (R)	Rette Jones Racing	Ford	80	0	Running	28
17	25	10	Jason White	Fast Track Racing	Chevrolet	80	0	Running	27
18	7	27	Tim Richmond	Richmond Motorsports	Toyota	80	0	Running	26
19	9	18	Drew Dollar	Kyle Busch Motorsports	Toyota	79	0	Accident	25
20	23	2	Nick Sanchez	Rev Racing	Chevrolet	79	0	Running	24
21	18	60	Michael Lira	Josh Williams Motorsports	Ford	79	0	Running	23
22	6	35	Greg Van Alst	Greg Van Alst Motorsports	Chevrolet	79	0	Running	22
23	29	12	D. L. Wilson	Fast Track Racing	Chevrolet	78	0	Running	21
24	32	06	Zachary Tinkle	Wayne Peterson Racing	Chevrolet	78	0	Running	20
25	35	01	Benny Chastain	Fast Track Racing	Ford	78	0	Running	19
26	16	57	Bryan Dauzat	Brother-in-Law Racing	Chevrolet	77	0	Running	18
27	36	07	Brian Kaltreider	Kaltreider Motorsports	Ford	76	0	Running	17
28	34	48	Brad Smith	Brad Smith Motorsports	Chevrolet	76	0	Running	16
29	33	0	Con Nicolopoulos	Wayne Peterson Racing	Ford	76	0	Running	15
30	30	69	Scott Melton	Kimmel Racing	Ford	75	0	Electrical	14
31	20	42	Christian Rose	Cook Racing Technologies	Chevrolet	73	0	Transmission	13
32	19	32	Max Gutiérrez	AM Racing	Chevrolet	63	0	Running	12
33	31	94	Bryce Haugeberg	Haugeberg Racing	Toyota	61	0	Running	11
34	13	97	Jason Kitzmiller	CR7 Motorsports	Chevrolet	51	0	Accident	10
35	27	68	Will Kimmel	Kimmel Racing	Ford	50	0	Accident	9
36	28	7	Eric Caudell	CCM Racing	Ford	21	0	Accident	8
Official race results

== Standings after the race ==
Drivers' Championship standings

Pos	Driver	Points
1	Corey Heim	49
2	Parker Chase	42 (-7)
3	Daniel Dye	41 (-8)
4	Sean Corr	41 (-8)
5	Gus Dean	39 (-10)
6	Andy Jankowiak	38 (-11)
7	Mason Diaz	37 (-12)
8	Dave Mader III	36 (-13)
9	Toni Breidinger	35 (-14)
10	Ryan Huff	34 (-15)

- Note: Only the first 10 positions are included for the driver standings.

Previous race: 2021 Reese's 150	ARCA Menards Series; 2022 season	Next race: 2022 General Tire 150 (Phoenix)
