= Jake Finch =

American racing driver (born 2005)

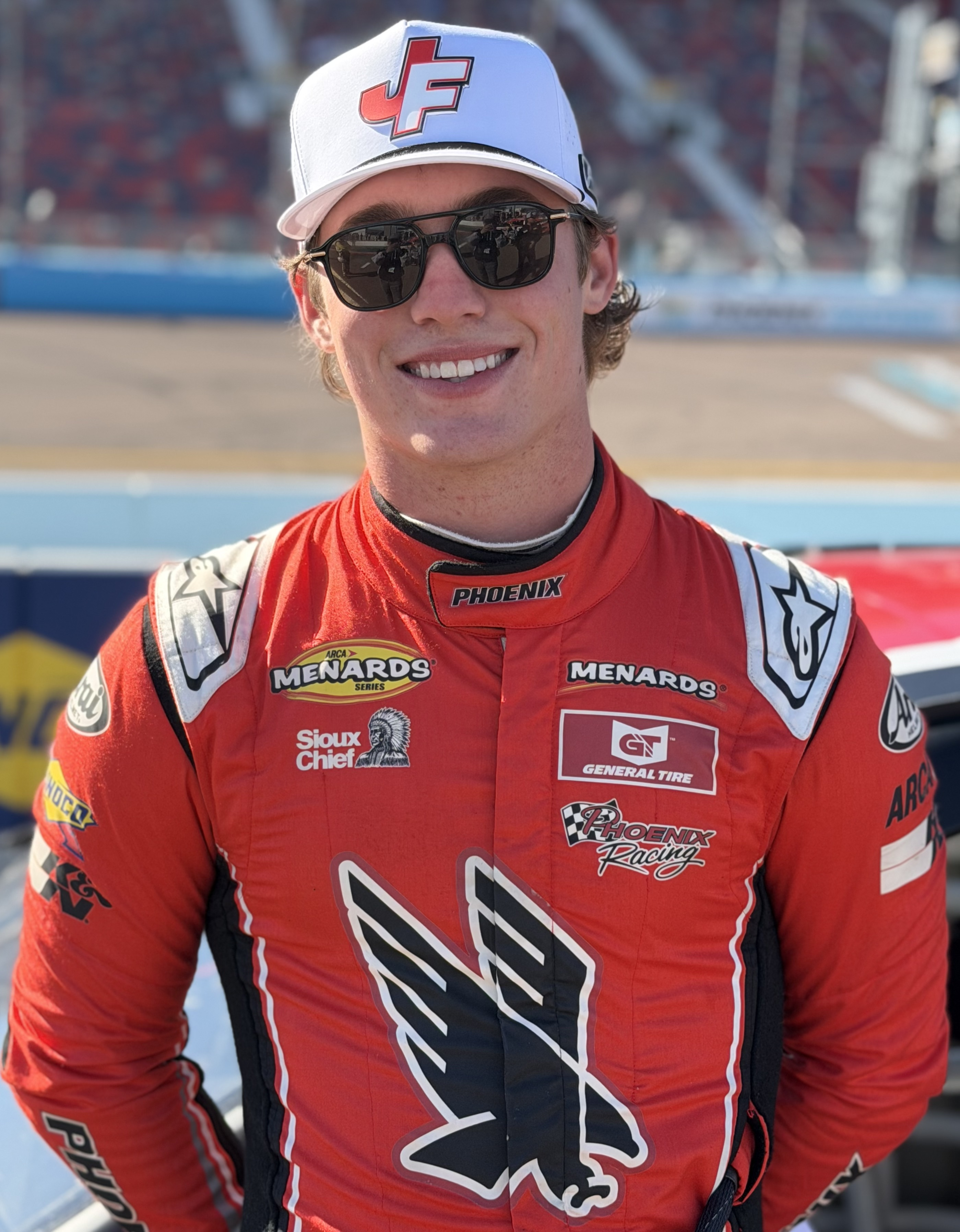
- Finch at Phoenix Raceway in 2025
- Born: James David Finch; June 16, 2005 (age 21); Lynn Haven, Florida, U.S.

NASCAR O'Reilly Auto Parts Series career
- 7 races run over 2 years
- 2026 position: 43rd
- Best finish: 43rd (2026)
- First race: 2025 BetRivers 200 (Dover)
- Last race: 2026 TPG 250 (Talladega)
Wins	Top tens	Poles
0	0	0

ARCA Menards Series career
- 23 races run over 5 years
- Best finish: 18th (2024)
- First race: 2022 General Tire Delivers 200 (Pensacola)
- Last race: 2026 Bush's Best 200 (Bristol)
- First win: 2024 General Tire 200 (Talladega)
Wins	Top tens	Poles
1	14	1

ARCA Menards Series East career
- 16 races run over 4 years
- Best finish: 6th (2022)
- First race: 2022 Pensacola 200 (Pensacola)
- Last race: 2026 Bush's Best 200 (Bristol)
- First win: 2023 General Tire 125 (Dover)
Wins	Top tens	Poles
1	13	1

ARCA Menards Series West career
- 7 races run over 3 years
- Best finish: 27th (2022)
- First race: 2022 NAPA Auto Parts 150 (Irwindale)
- Last race: 2025 Desert Diamond Casino West Valley 100 (Phoenix)
Wins	Top tens	Poles
0	6	0
- Statistics up to date as of November 7, 2026.

James David "Jake" Finch Jr. (born June 16, 2005) is an American professional stock car racing driver. He last competed part-time in the NASCAR O'Reilly Auto Parts Series, driving the No. 9 Chevrolet SS for JR Motorsports. He also competes part-time in the ARCA Menards Series, driving the No. 15 Toyota for Nitro Motorsports, and the No. 1 Chevrolet for Phoenix Racing. He has previously competed in the ARCA Menards Series East, and the ARCA Menards Series West.

== Racing career ==
Finch began racing go-karts at a young age. In 2020, he would drive in three late model races for Anthony Campi Racing and would win in his first start after dominating the race and leading the most laps. In his next two starts, he would finish second. Phoenix Racing, the former NASCAR Cup Series team owned by Finch's father James that was sold to Turner Scott Motorsports co-owner Harry Scott Jr. in 2013, would re-open its doors and Finch would drive in several late model races with them in 2021. He entered the SRL Southwest Tour in 2022 for the same team, finishing 22nd and 23rd in his first two starts.

=== ARCA Menards Series ===
On March 15, 2022, Phoenix Racing announced that Finch would be making his ARCA Menards Series East debut for the team in their No. 1 car at Five Flags Speedway. It would be the first time since 2013 that Phoenix Racing would compete in a NASCAR-sanctioned race. On April 26, 2022, Finch would sign with Venturini Motorsports for one race in the ARCA Menards Series East (at Dover driving the No. 25), and one race in the ARCA Menards Series (at Pocono driving the No. 55). Finch would return to his family team and the No. 1 car for the East Series race at Nashville. He would start on the pole, lead 44 laps, and finish second in the race. In both of his East Series races for Phoenix Racing, Finch drove an unbadged Toyota. He finished sixth in the East Series standings despite running a partial schedule. He also raced in two ARCA Menards Series West races for Phoenix Racing, finished in the top-ten in both races.

In 2023, Finch once again ran a partial schedule between the main ARCA series and the East Series, splitting between Venturini Motorsports and Phoenix Racing. At the East Series race at Dover, Finch, driving for Venturini Motorsports, would hold off Landen Lewis in a side-by-side battle on the final restart to earn his first career ARCA Menards Series East win. Finch would also dominate the race, leading a race-high 89 laps.

In 2024, Finch returned to Venturini on a partial schedule, with his first start coming at Daytona International Speedway. At Daytona, he led the most laps and was involved in a multi-car crash while leading on the final lap. In his next race at Talladega Superspeedway, he led every lap of the race to earn his first career ARCA Menards Series win. It was the first Talladega race in series history where a driver led every lap to win the race.

Finch remained with Venturini in 2025. He was originally scheduled to compete at Michigan International Speedway, but withdrew due to illness and was replaced by Corey Heim.

On January 13, 2026, it was announced that Finch will drive for Nitro Motorsports at Daytona and Talladega.

=== NASCAR O'Reilly Auto Parts Series ===
Finch's No. 9 car at Charlotte Motor Speedway in 2026.

On April 16, 2025, Dale Earnhardt Jr. revealed on The Dale Jr. Download that Finch would make his NASCAR Xfinity Series debut during the season, driving the No. 17 for Hendrick Motorsports. On July, the team confirmed Finch would make his debut at Dover.

On March 25, 2026, it was announced that Finch will drive the No. 9 for JR Motorsports in five races.

== Personal life ==
Jake's father, James Finch, is the owner of the former NASCAR Cup Series team, Phoenix Racing. He also runs an airport construction company, Phoenix Construction. Before Jake started racing, he was an active baseball player for his local school. He attended A. Crawford Mosley High School and graduated in the class of 2023.

== Motorsports career results ==
=== Stock car career summary ===
Season	Series	Team	Races	Wins	Top 5	Top 10	Points	Position
2021	CARS Super Late Model Tour	Phoenix Racing	2	0	0	1	0	N/A
2022	ARCA Menards Series West	Phoenix Racing	2	0	0	2	123	27th
2022	ARCA Menards Series East	Phoenix Racing	4	0	1	2	235	6th
2022	ARCA Menards Series East	Venturini Motorsports	1	0	0	1	235	6th
2022	ARCA Menards Series	Venturini Motorsports	1	0	0	1	104	35th
2022	ARCA Menards Series	Phoenix Racing	2	0	0	1	104	35th
2023	ASA STARS National Tour	Phoenix Racing	5	0	0	2	206	15th
2023	ARCA Menards Series West	Phoenix Racing	0	0	0	0	0	N/A
2023	ARCA Menards Series East	Venturini Motorsports	2	1	2	2	203	11th
2023	ARCA Menards Series East	Phoenix Racing	3	0	2	3	203	11th
2023	ARCA Menards Series	Venturini Motorsports	4	0	1	3	214	23rd
2023	ARCA Menards Series	Phoenix Racing	2	0	1	2	214	23rd
2024	ASA STARS National Tour	Phoenix Racing	3	0	3	3	155	21st
2024	ARCA Menards Series West	Venturini Motorsports	4	0	1	3	147	19th
2024	ARCA Menards Series East	Venturini Motorsports	1	0	0	1	73	27th
2024	ARCA Menards Series East	Phoenix Racing	1	0	0	1	73	27th
2024	ARCA Menards Series	Venturini Motorsports	6	1	3	3	253	18th
2024	ARCA Menards Series	Phoenix Racing	1	0	0	1	253	18th
2025	ASA STARS National Tour	Phoenix Racing	2	0	0	1	80	35th
2025	ARCA Menards Series West	Phoenix Racing	1	0	0	1	35	52nd
2025	ARCA Menards Series East	Venturini Motorsports	3	0	0	2	92	25th
2025	ARCA Menards Series	Venturini Motorsports	4	0	0	3	141	31st
2025	NASCAR Xfinity Series	Hendrick Motorsports	1	0	0	0	20	58th
2026	ASA STARS National Tour	Phoenix Racing	3	0	0	0		
2026	ARCA Menards Series East	Phoenix Racing	1	0	0	0	16	66th
2026	ARCA Menards Series	Nitro Motorsports	2	0	0	0	74	60th
2026	ARCA Menards Series	Phoenix Racing	1	0	0	0	74	60th
2026	NASCAR O'Reilly Auto Parts Series	JR Motorsports	6	0	0	0	63	43rd

=== NASCAR ===
(key) (Bold – Pole position awarded by qualifying time. Italics – Pole position earned by points standings or practice time. * – Most laps led.)

==== O'Reilly Auto Parts Series ====
NASCAR O'Reilly Auto Parts Series results
Year	Team	No.	Make	1	2	3	4	5	6	7	8	9	10	11	12	13	14	15	16	17	18	19	20	21	22	23	24	25	26	27	28	29	30	31	32	33	NOAPSC	Pts	Ref
2025	Hendrick Motorsports	17	Chevy	DAY	ATL	COA	PHO	LVS	HOM	MAR	DAR	BRI	CAR	TAL	TEX	CLT	NSH	MXC	POC	ATL	CSC	SON	DOV; 17	IND	IOW	GLN	DAY	PIR	GTW	BRI	KAN	ROV	LVS	TAL	MAR	PHO	58th	20	
2026	JR Motorsports	9	Chevy	DAY	ATL	COA	PHO	LVS	DAR	MAR	CAR	BRI	KAN	TAL	TEX	GLN	DOV	CLT	NSH	POC	COR	SON	CHI	ATL; 30	IND	IOW	DAY	DAR; 18	GTW	BRI; 11	LVS	CLT; 31	PHO; 38	TAL; 38	MAR	HOM	43rd	63	

=== ARCA Menards Series ===
(key) (Bold – Pole position awarded by qualifying time. Italics – Pole position earned by points standings or practice time. * – Most laps led. ** – All laps led.)

ARCA Menards Series results
Year	Team	No.	Make	1	2	3	4	5	6	7	8	9	10	11	12	13	14	15	16	17	18	19	20	AMSC	Pts	Ref
2022	Venturini Motorsports	55	Toyota	DAY	PHO	TAL	KAN	CLT	IOW	BLN	ELK	MOH	POC; 7	IRP	MCH	GLN	ISF							35th	104	
2022	Phoenix Racing	1	Toyota															MLW; 8	DSF	KAN	BRI; 13	SLM	TOL	35th	104	
2023	Venturini Motorsports	1	Toyota	DAY	PHO	TAL	KAN	CLT	BLN	ELK	MOH	IOW	POC; 10											23rd	214	
2023	Venturini Motorsports	15	Toyota											MCH; 12	IRP					KAN; 5				23rd	214	
2023	Venturini Motorsports	55	Toyota													GLN; 10	ISF							23rd	214	
2023	Phoenix Racing	1	Toyota															MLW; 9	DSF		BRI; 4	SLM	TOL	23rd	214	
2024	Venturini Motorsports	20	Toyota	DAY; 11*	PHO	TAL; 1**	DOV	KAN; 5	CLT	IOW	MOH	BLN	IRP	SLM; 18	ELK	MCH; 4	ISF	MLW	DSF					18th	253	
2024	Venturini Motorsports	55	Toyota																	GLN; 15				18th	253	
2024	Phoenix Racing	1	Toyota																		BRI; 8	KAN	TOL	18th	253	
2025	Venturini Motorsports	25	Toyota	DAY; 15	PHO	TAL; 7	KAN	CLT	MCH; Wth	BLN	ELK	LRP	DOV; 7	IRP	IOW	GLN	ISF	MAD	DSF					31st	141	
2025	Venturini Motorsports	15	Toyota																	BRI; 7	SLM	KAN	TOL	31st	141	
2026	Nitro Motorsports	15	Toyota	DAY; 20*	PHO	KAN	TAL; 12	GLN	TOL	MCH	POC	BER	ELK	CHI	LRP	IRP	IOW	ISF	MAD	DSF	SLM			60th	74	
2026	Phoenix Racing	1	Chevy																			BRI; 28	KAN	60th	74	

==== ARCA Menards Series East ====
ARCA Menards Series East results
Year	Team	No.	Make	1	2	3	4	5	6	7	8	AMSEC	Pts	Ref
2022	Phoenix Racing	1	Toyota	NSM	FIF; 8		**NSV**; 2	IOW	MLW; 8	BRI; 13		6th	235	
2022	Venturini Motorsports	25	Toyota			DOV; 6						6th	235	
2023	Venturini Motorsports	20	Toyota	FIF; 3	DOV; 1*							11th	203	
2023	Phoenix Racing	1	Toyota			NSV; 5	FRS	IOW	IRP	MLW; 9	BRI; 4	11th	203	
2024	Venturini Motorsports	55	Toyota	FIF; 7	DOV	NSV	FRS	IOW	IRP	MLW		27th	73	
2024	Phoenix Racing	1	Toyota								BRI; 8	27th	73	
2025	Venturini Motorsports	20	Toyota	FIF	CAR; 26	NSV	FRS					25th	92	
2025	Venturini Motorsports	25	Toyota					DOV; 7	IRP	IOW		25th	92	
2025	Venturini Motorsports	15	Toyota								BRI; 7	25th	92	
2026	Phoenix Racing	1	Chevy	HCY	CAR	NSV	TOL	IRP	FRS	IOW	BRI; 28	66th	16	

==== ARCA Menards Series West ====
ARCA Menards Series West results
Year	Team	No.	Make	1	2	3	4	5	6	7	8	9	10	11	12	AMSWC	Pts	Ref
2022	Phoenix Racing	1	Toyota	PHO	IRW	KCR	PIR	SON	IRW; 6	EVG	PIR	AAS	LVS	PHO; 9		27th	123	
2023	Phoenix Racing	1	Toyota	PHO	IRW	KCR	PIR	SON	IRW	SHA	EVG	AAS	LVS	MAD	PHO; Wth	N/A	0	
2024	Venturini Motorsports	15	Toyota	PHO	KER	PIR; 11	SON									19th	147	
2024	Venturini Motorsports	20	Toyota					IRW; 3	IRW; 8	SHA	TRI	MAD	AAS	KER		19th	147	
2024	Venturini Motorsports	55	Toyota												PHO; 7	19th	147	
2025	Phoenix Racing	15	Toyota	KER	PHO	TUC	CNS	KER	SON	TRI	PIR	AAS	MAD	LVS	PHO; 9	52nd	35	

=== CARS Super Late Model Tour ===
(key)

CARS Super Late Model Tour results
Year	Team	No.	Make	1	2	3	4	5	6	7	8	CSLMTC	Pts	Ref
2021	Phoenix Racing	51F	Chevy	HCY	GPS	NSH; 16	JEN	HCY	MMS	TCM; 9	SBO	N/A	0	

=== ASA STARS National Tour ===
(key) (Bold – Pole position awarded by qualifying time. Italics – Pole position earned by points standings or practice time. * – Most laps led. ** – All laps led.)

ASA STARS National Tour results
Year	Team	No.	Make	1	2	3	4	5	6	7	8	9	10	11	12	ASNTC	Pts	Ref
2023	Phoenix Racing	51F	Chevy	FIF; 16	MAD		HCY; 24	MLW	AND	WIR	TOL		NSV; 7			15th	206	
2023	Phoenix Racing	51	Chevy			NWS; 19										15th	206	
2023	Phoenix Racing	51F	Ford									WIN; 9				15th	206	
2024	Phoenix Racing	51F	N/A	NSM; 10	FIF; 7	HCY	MAD	MLW	AND	OWO	TOL	WIN	NSV; 8			21st	155	
2025	Phoenix Racing	51F	Chevy	NSM; 16	FIF; 10	DOM	HCY	NPS	MAD	SLG	AND	OWO	TOL	WIN	NSV	35th	80	
2026	Phoenix Racing	51F	Chevy	NSM; 17	FIF; 14	HCY	SLG	MAD	NPS	OWO	TRI	WIN	NSV; 22	NSM		-*	-*	
