= Chase Burda =

American racing driver

- Born: December 30, 2004 (age 21) Columbiaville, Michigan, U.S.

CARS Pro Late Model Tour career
- Debut season: 2023
- Years active: 2023
- Starts: 1
- Championships: 0
- Wins: 0
- Poles: 0
- Best finish: 43rd in 2023
- Statistics up to date as of November 22, 2026.

Chase Burda (born December 30, 2004) is an American professional stock car racing driver who has competed in the zMAX CARS Tour and the ASA STARS National Tour.

In 2025, it was revealed that Burda would participate in the pre-season test for the ARCA Menards Series at Daytona International Speedway, driving for Fast Track Racing as a part on the Road to Daytona program.

Burda has also competed in series such as the ASA CRA Super Series, where he won the championship in 2024, the CRA JEGS All-Stars Tour, where he won the championship in 2023, the ASA Midwest Tour, and the NASCAR Local Racing Series.

== Motorsports results ==
=== Stock car career summary ===
Season	Series	Team	Races	Wins	Top 5	Top 10	Points	Position
2023	ASA STARS National Tour	Chase Burda Motorsports	4	0	1	3	198	17th
2023	CARS Pro Late Model Tour	Chase Burda Motorsports	1	0	1	1	40	43rd
2024	ASA STARS National Tour	Chase Burda Motorsports	5	0	0	1	227	15th
2025	ASA STARS National Tour	Chase Burda Motorsports	2	0	0	0	80	34th
2026	ASA STARS National Tour	Chase Burda Motorsports	1	0	1	1		

=== CARS Pro Late Model Tour ===
(key)

CARS Pro Late Model Tour results
Year	Team	No.	Make	1	2	3	4	5	6	7	8	9	10	11	12	13	CPLMTC	Pts	Ref
2023	Chase Burda Motorsports	18	Ford	SNM	HCY	ACE	NWS	TCM	DIL	CRW	WKS	HCY	FLC	SBO	TCM; 2	CRW	43rd	30	

=== ASA STARS National Tour ===
(key) (Bold – Pole position awarded by qualifying time. Italics – Pole position earned by points standings or practice time. * – Most laps led. ** – All laps led.)

ASA STARS National Tour results
Year	Team	No.	Make	1	2	3	4	5	6	7	8	9	10	11	12	ASNTC	Pts	Ref
2023	Chase Burda Motorsports	18B	Chevy	FIF	MAD	NWS	HCY	MLW	AND; 10	WIR						17th	198	
2023	Chase Burda Motorsports	18	Chevy								TOL; 3	WIN; 7				17th	198	
2023	Chase Burda Motorsports	18	Ford										NSV; 28			17th	198	
2024	Chase Burda Motorsports	18	Ford	NSM	FIF	HCY	MAD	MLW	AND; 14	OWO; 7	TOL; 12					15th	227	
2024	Chase Burda Motorsports	18	Toyota									WIN; 11	NSV; 22			15th	227	
2025	Chase Burda Motorsports	18	N/A	NSM	FIF	DOM	HCY	NPS	MAD	SLG	AND; 11	OWO; 21	TOL	WIN	NSV	34th	80	
2026	Chase Burda Motorsports	18	Ford	NSM	FIF	HCY	SLG	MAD	NPS	OWO; 5	TRI	WIN; Wth	NSV	NSM		-*	-*	
