= George Phillips (racing driver) =

American racing driver

- Born: August 1, 2008 (age 18) Charlotte, North Carolina, U.S.

CARS Pro Late Model Tour career
- Debut season: 2023
- Years active: 2023–2024
- Starts: 13
- Championships: 0
- Wins: 0
- Poles: 1
- Best finish: 6th in 2023
- Statistics up to date as of March 20, 2026.

George Phillips (born August 1, 2008) is an American professional stock car racing driver. He currently competes in the ASA STARS National Tour, driving the No. 22P Toyota for Wilson Motorsports.

Phillips has also competed in series such as the CARS Pro Late Model Tour, the Carolina Pro Late Model Series, the INEX Winter Heat Series, the World Series of Asphalt Stock Car Racing, and the NASCAR Weekly Series.

== Racing career ==
Phillips first raced in 7-volt cars, and was later mentored by four-time NASCAR Cup Series champion Jeff Gordon on his way to quarter midgets, where he won two cup titles and two track championships. Afterward, Phillips ran bandoleros under the suggestion of John Bickford, Gordon's stepfather. At the age of twelve, he progressed to legends cars, where he ran for two years.

At the age of fourteen, Phillips moved up to pro late models, where he drove for Setzer Racing & Development. He won the Carolina Pro Late Model Series championship in 2023 with six wins across the year. It was also during this year that he ran in the CARS Pro Late Model Tour for Setzer, where he finished sixth in the points standings. He also ran in the INEX Summer Shootout at Charlotte Motor Speedway, where he won the championship in the Semi-Pro division.

In 2024, Phillips joined FatHead Racing, where he won multiple pro late model races.

In 2025, Phillips signed a deal to become a development driver for Toyota. Alongside this, he would run full-time in the ASA STARS National Tour, where he drove the No. 22 for Wilson Motorsports. He finished ninth in the points and won Rookie of the Year honors.

== Personal life ==
Phillips' mother was a former All-American NCAA Division 1 runner.

== Motorsports career results ==
=== Stock car career summary ===
| Season | Series | Team | Races | Wins | Top 5 | Top 10 | Points | Position |
|---|---|---|---|---|---|---|---|---|
| 2023 | CARS Pro Late Model Tour | Setzer Racing & Development | 11 | 0 | 1 | 5 | 218 | 6th |
| 2024 | CARS Pro Late Model Tour | FadHead Racing | 2 | 0 | 0 | 1 | 0 | N/A |
| 2025 | ASA STARS National Tour | Wilson Motorsports | 12 | 0 | 1 | 6 | 525 | 9th |
| 2026 | ASA STARS National Tour | Wilson Motorsports | 7 | 0 | 1 | 3 | | |

=== CARS Pro Late Model Tour ===
(key)

CARS Pro Late Model Tour results
| Year | Team | No. | Make | 1 | 2 | 3 | 4 | 5 | 6 | 7 | 8 | 9 | 10 | 11 | 12 | 13 | CPLMTC | Pts | Ref |
|---|---|---|---|---|---|---|---|---|---|---|---|---|---|---|---|---|---|---|---|
| 2023 | Setzer Racing & Development | 6 | Chevy | SNM; 14 | HCY; 25 | ACE; 16 | NWS; 19 | TCM; 20 | **DIL**; 8 | CRW; 15 | WKS; 6 | HCY; 9 | TCM | SBO; 10 | TCM | CRW; 5 | 6th | 218 | |
| 2024 | FatHead Racing | 55 | N/A | SNM | HCY | OCS | ACE | TCM | CRW | HCY; 6 | NWS; 11 | ACE | FLC | SBO | TCM | NWS | N/A | 0 | |

=== ASA STARS National Tour ===
(key) (Bold – Pole position awarded by qualifying time. Italics – Pole position earned by points standings or practice time. * – Most laps led. ** – All laps led.)

ASA STARS National Tour results
| Year | Team | No. | Make | 1 | 2 | 3 | 4 | 5 | 6 | 7 | 8 | 9 | 10 | 11 | 12 | ASNTC | Pts | Ref |
|---|---|---|---|---|---|---|---|---|---|---|---|---|---|---|---|---|---|---|
| 2025 | Wilson Motorsports | 22P | Toyota | NSM; 4 | FIF; 13 | DOM; 20 | HCY; 10 | NPS; 13 | MAD; 18 | SLG; 14 | AND; 10 | OWO; 10 | TOL; 9 | WIN; 9 | NSV; 15 | 9th | 535 | |
| 2026 | Wilson Motorsports | 22P | Toyota | NSM; 15 | FIF; 11 | HCY; 23 | SLG | MAD | NPS; 4 | OWO | TRI; 16 | WIN | NSV; 6 | NSM; 6 | | -* | -* | |
