= 2025 ASA STARS National Tour =

3rd season of the ASA STARS National Tour

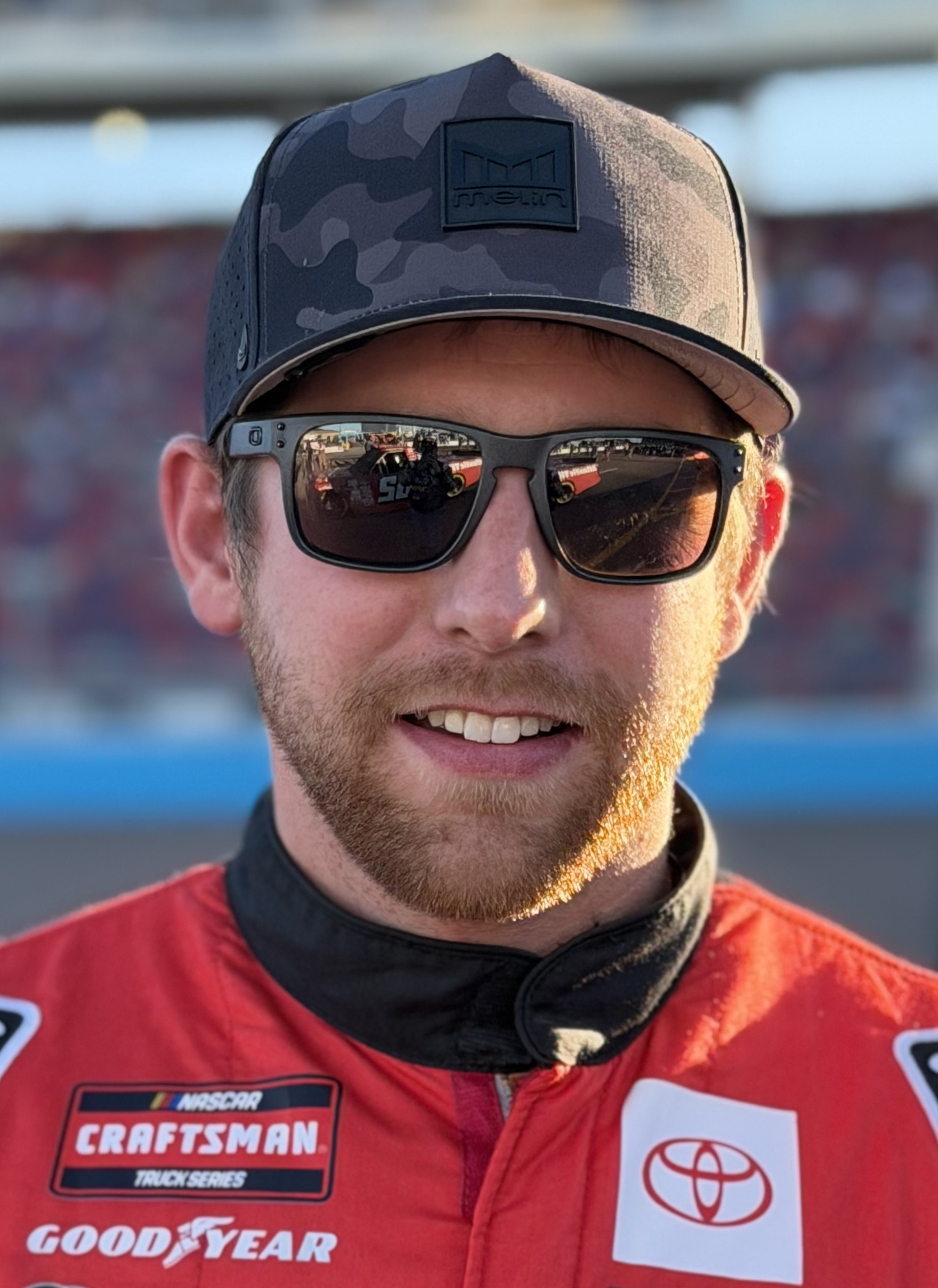
Cole Butcher, the 2025 ASA STARS National Tour champion

The 2025 Appalachian Sucker Punch ASA STARS National Tour was the 3rd season of the ASA STARS National Tour, a stock car racing series. It began at New Smyrna Speedway with the Clyde Hart Memorial 200 on February 11, and ended at Nashville Fairgrounds Speedway with the All American 400 on November 9.

Casey Roderick entered the season as the defending champion, but did not run a full season to defend his title. Cole Butcher went on to win his first series championship.

== Schedule ==
No.	Race title	Track	Date
1	Clyde Hart Memorial 200	New Smyrna Speedway, New Smyrna Beach, Florida	February 11
2	Sunshine State 200	Five Flags Speedway, Pensacola, Florida	March 23
3	Appalachian Sucker Punch 250	Dominion Raceway, Thornburg, Virginia	April 5
4	Ross & Witmer 255	Hickory Motor Speedway, Hickory, North Carolina	May 22
5	Food Country USA 300	Newport Speedway, Newport, Tennessee	May 24
6	El Bandido Yankee Tequila Capital 250	Madison International Speedway, Oregon, Wisconsin	June 13
7	El Bandido Yankee Tequila 300	Slinger Speedway, Slinger, Wisconsin	June 15
8	Redbud 400	Anderson Speedway, Anderson, Indiana	July 26
9	Michigan 300	Owosso Speedway, Ovid, Michigan	August 20
10	Glass City 200	Toledo Speedway, Toledo, Ohio	September 13
11	Winchester 400	Winchester Speedway, Winchester, Indiana	October 12
12	All American 400	Nashville Fairgrounds Speedway, Nashville, Tennessee	November 9

== Results and standings ==
=== Races ===
No.	Race	Fastest qualifier	Most laps led	Winning driver
1	Clyde Hart Memorial 200	Conner Jones	Ty Majeski	Gavan Boschele
2	Sunshine State 200	Carson Brown	Cole Butcher	Cole Butcher
3	Appalachian Sucker Punch 250	Carson Brown	Cole Butcher; Carson Brown (Note: Butcher and Brown both led 91 laps.)	Cole Butcher
4	Ross & Witmer 255	Colby Howard	Cole Butcher	Colby Howard
5	Food Country USA 300	Carson Brown	Dawson Sutton	Derek Kraus
6	El Bandido Yankee Tequila Capital 250	Gabe Sommers	Carson Brown	Carson Brown
7	El Bandido Yankee Tequila 300	Ty Majeski	Luke Fenhaus	Cole Butcher
8	Redbud 400	Derek Kraus	Derek Kraus	Cole Butcher
9	Michigan 300	Kyle Steckly	Kyle Steckly	Bubba Pollard
10	Glass City 200	Dawson Sutton	Dawson Sutton	Dawson Sutton
11	Winchester 400	Ty Majeski	Ty Majeski	Ty Majeski
12	All American 400	Dawson Sutton	Dawson Sutton	Dawson Sutton

=== Drivers' championship ===
(key) Bold - Pole position awarded by time. Italics - Pole position set by final practice results or rainout. * – Most laps led.

Pos	Driver	NSM	FIF	DOM	HCY	NPS	MAD	SLG	AND	OWO	TOL	WIN	NSV	Points
1	Cole Butcher	11	1*	1*	6*	11	2	1	1	3	2	3	14	894
2	Carson Brown	23	**26**	**4***	4	**4**	1*	19	4	4	6	6	2	779
3	Dawson Sutton	22	11	5	9	3*	14	7	13	2	**1***	2	**1***	767
4	Gavan Boschele	1	6	15	3	12	8	5	2	5	10	15	8	658
5	Stephen Nasse	5	4	7	16	2	4	3	16			5	5	568
6	Kyle Steckly	31	7	13	15	10	20	13	3	**8***	14	7	22	564
7	Derek Thorn	14	12	2	13	15	10	10	18	12	15	18	3	558
8	Derek Kraus	12	20	18	11	1	9	4	**12***	18	21	13	20	550
9	George Phillips	4	13	20	10	13	18	14	10	10	9	9	15	535
10	Austin Nason	13	16	9	14	5	6	15	7	19	13		7	521
11	Chase Pinsonneault	20	17	12	12	8	15	6	6	14	18	16	11	509
12	Ty Majeski	25*					21	**2**			5	**1***	6	399
13	Bubba Pollard	9	9	14	5	9				1	17			380
14	Matt Craig	17	3	10	17	7						11	13	345
15	Kasey Kleyn		27				5	9		13	4	10	27	320
16	Ty Fredrickson	29	28	8			3	12		7			10	320
17	Colby Howard	15	6		**1**	6								278
18	Gabe Sommers	7					**12**	17					9	231
19	Albert Francis			11						9	7	22	16	229
20	Gabrielle Grisby					16	19	18	20		12	23	DNS	214
21	Steve Ulman			17					5	20	20	20		185
22	Billy VanMeter	21		16					14			4		183
23	Jake Garcia		2	3								17	DNS	180
24	Spencer Davis	10	24		7								19	163
25	Conner Jones	**28**	18			14							24	148
26	Caden Kvapil			6	20						8			142
27	Johnny Sauter	DNQ	22	19						6				124
28	Luke Fenhaus						11	16*						122
29	Jonathan Knee							11			11		17	117
30	Penn Sauter						16				19		21	112
31	Blake Rowe									11		8		110
32	Justin Mondeik						7	8						99
33	Kole Raz								8	17				88
34	Chase Burda								11	21				80
35	Jake Finch	16	10											80
36	Max Reaves										3			80
37	Dylan Bates								9				25	77
38	Kyle Crump									15	16			73
39	William Sawalich	2												72
40	Dylan Fetcho												4	70
41	Chase Elliott				2									69
42	Michael Hinde	19											23	65
43	Nicholas Naugle	18	23											63
44	Cory Hall	3												61
45	Dustin Smith	24	21											58
46	Will Sahutske											24		58
47	Camden Murphy				8									52
48	Christopher Bell	6												51
49	Kaden Honeycutt		8											50
50	Derek Griffith	8												47
51	Andrew Morrissey						17							45
52	Erik Jones									16				45
53	Casey Roderick												12	42
54	Chris Shannon											12		40
55	Ridge Oien						13							39
56	Connor Okrzesik		14											38
57	Jesse Bernhagen											14		38
58	Carson Hocevar								15					37
59	Jackson Boone		15											37
60	Dakoda Armstrong								17					35
61	Brandon Turbush				18									34
62	Johnny Brazier												18	34
63	Jacob Gomes		19											33
64	Logan Bearden											19		33
65	Nick Loden				19									33
66	Ryder Van Alst								19					33
67	Avery Demland											21		31
68	Noah Gragson									DSQ				29
69	Buddy Shepherd		25											27
70	Jon Beach											25		27
71	Boris Jurkovic												26	26
72	Chris Munson											26		26
73	Paul Shafer Jr.	26												26
74	Cody Ware	27												25
75	Joseph Meyer												28	24
76	Levon Van Der Geest												29	23
77	Brad May	30												22
78	Mike Hopkins	32												20
79	Austin Green												DNS	5
80	Austin Teras	DNQ												5
81	Bobby Good	DNQ												5
82	Derrick Kelley	DNQ												5
83	Landon Pembelton			DNS										5
84	Michael Simko										DNS			5
Pos	Driver	NSM	FIF	DOM	HCY	NPS	MAD	SLG	AND	OWO	TOL	WIN	NSV	Points

== See also ==
- 2025 NASCAR Cup Series
- 2025 NASCAR Xfinity Series
- 2025 NASCAR Craftsman Truck Series
- 2025 ARCA Menards Series
- 2025 ARCA Menards Series East
- 2025 ARCA Menards Series West
- 2025 NASCAR Whelen Modified Tour
- 2025 NASCAR Canada Series
- 2025 NASCAR Mexico Series
- 2025 NASCAR Euro Series
- 2025 NASCAR Brasil Series
- 2025 CARS Tour
- 2025 SMART Modified Tour
