= Gabe Sommers =

American racing driver

- Born: April 3, 2003 (age 23) Plover, Wisconsin, U.S.

CARS Super Late Model Tour career
- Debut season: 2020
- Years active: 2020
- Starts: 2
- Championships: 0
- Wins: 0
- Poles: 0
- Best finish: N/A in 2020
- Statistics up to date as of November 20, 2026.

Gabe Sommers (born April 4, 2003) is an American professional stock car racing driver who has competed in the CARS Tour and the ASA STARS National Tour.

In 2020, Sommers participated in Fast Track Racing's Road to Daytona program, where he participated in the pre-season test for the ARCA Menards Series at Daytona International Speedway.

Sommers has also competed in series such as the ASA Midwest Tour, where he won the championship in 2023 and 2024, the Alive for 5 Super Late Model Series, where he won the championship in 2022 and 2024, the World Series of Asphalt Stock Car Racing, and the NASCAR Local Racing Series.

== Motorsports results ==
=== Stock car career summary ===
Season	Series	Team	Races	Wins	Top 5	Top 10	Points	Position
2020	CARS Super Late Model Tour	Scott Sommers	2	0	0	0	0	N/A
2023	ASA STARS National Tour	Gabe Sommers Racing	4	0	2	4	249	11th
2024	ASA STARS National Tour	Gabe Sommers Racing	2	0	0	1	117	26th
2025	ASA STARS National Tour	Gabe Sommers Racing	4	0	0	2	231	18th
2026	ASA STARS National Tour	Gabe Sommers Racing	3	0	0	0		

=== CARS Super Late Model Tour ===
(key)

CARS Super Late Model Tour results
Year	Team	No.	Make	1	2	3	4	5	6	7	8	CSLMTC	Pts	Ref
2020	Scott Sommers	15S	Toyota	SNM; 13	HCY	JEN	HCY	FCS	BRI	FLC		N/A	0	
2020	Scott Sommers	15	Toyota								NSH; 13	N/A	0	

=== ASA STARS National Tour ===
(key) (Bold – Pole position awarded by qualifying time. Italics – Pole position earned by points standings or practice time. * – Most laps led. ** – All laps led.)

ASA STARS National Tour results
Year	Team	No.	Make	1	2	3	4	5	6	7	8	9	10	11	12	ASNTC	Pts	Ref
2023	Gabe Sommers Racing	15	Ford	FIF; 6												11th	249	
2023	Gabe Sommers Racing	15S	Toyota		MAD; 3	NWS	HCY									11th	249	
2023	Gabe Sommers Racing	15	Toyota					MLW; 7	AND							11th	249	
2023	Gabe Sommers Racing	15S	Chevy							WIR; 4	TOL	WIN	NSV			11th	249	
2024	Gabe Sommers Racing	15	Ford	NSM; DNQ	FIF	HCY	MAD; 7	MLW; 14	AND	OWO	TOL	WIN	NSV			26th	117	
2025	Gabe Sommers Racing	15S	Ford	NSM; 7	FIF	DOM	HCY	NPS								18th	231	
2025	Gabe Sommers Racing	15	Ford						**MAD**; 12	SLG; 17	AND	OWO	TOL	WIN	NSV; 9	18th	231	
2026	Gabe Sommers Racing	15	Ford	NSM; 28	FIF	HCY	SLG	MAD; 12	NPS	OWO	TRI	WIN	NSV; 27	NSM		-*	-*	
