= Penn Sauter =

American racing driver

- Born: January 13, 2010 (age 16) DeForest, Wisconsin, U.S.

ASA STARS National Tour career
- Debut season: 2025
- Years active: 2025
- Starts: 6
- Championships: 0
- Wins: 0
- Poles: 0
- Best finish: 30th in 2025
- Statistics up to date as of November 20, 2026.

Penn Sauter (born January 13, 2010) is an American professional stock car racing driver who has competed in the ASA STARS National Tour. He is the son of 2016 NASCAR Camping World Truck Series champion driver Johnny Sauter, and the grandson of Jim Sauter.

Sauter first started racing at the age of 11, where he competed in Bandoleros.

In 2026, Sauter was announced as a finalist in the Kulwicki Driver Development Program.

Sauter has also competed in series such as the ASA Midwest Tour, where he finished second in the points in 2026, the ASA CRA Super Series, the Alive for 5 Super Late Model Series, and the TUNDRA Super Late Model Series.

== Motorsports results ==
=== Stock car career summary ===
Season	Series	Team	Races	Wins	Top 5	Top 10	Points	Position
2025	ASA STARS National Tour	Duke Thorson	3	0	0	0	112	30th
2026	ASA STARS National Tour	Johnny Sauter	3	0	0	2		

=== ASA STARS National Tour ===
(key) (Bold – Pole position awarded by qualifying time. Italics – Pole position earned by points standings or practice time. * – Most laps led. ** – All laps led.)

ASA STARS National Tour results
Year	Team	No.	Make	1	2	3	4	5	6	7	8	9	10	11	12	ASNTC	Pts	Ref
2025	Duke Thorson	5	Ford	NSM	FIF	DOM	HCY	NPS	MAD; 16	SLG	AND	OWO				30th	112	
2025	Duke Thorson	5S	Ford										TOL; 19	WIN	NSV; 21	30th	112	
2026	Johnny Sauter	5S	Ford	NSM	FIF	HCY	SLG	MAD; 7	NPS	OWO; 9	TRI	WIN	NSV; 24	NSM		-*	-*	
