= Nick Loden =

American racing driver

- Born: November 13, 2004 (age 21) Stanley, North Carolina, U.S.

CARS Pro Late Model Tour career
- Debut season: 2022
- Years active: 2022–present
- Starts: 24
- Championships: 0
- Wins: 1
- Poles: 4
- Best finish: 11th in 2022
- Statistics up to date as of October 10, 2026.

Nick Loden (born November 13, 2004) is an American professional stock car racing driver. He currently competes in the zMAX CARS Tour, driving the No. 43 for Nick Loden Racing. He is a former development driver for Ingersoll Rand.

In 2023, Loden got his first win in the CARS Pro Late Model Tour at South Boston Speedway.

Loden has also competed in series such as the Carolina Pro Late Model Series, where he won the championship in 2021, the ASA STARS National Tour, the IHRA Stock Car Series, and the INEX Winter Heat.

== Motorsports results ==
=== CARS Pro Late Model Tour ===
(key)

CARS Pro Late Model Tour results
Year	Team	No.	Make	1	2	3	4	5	6	7	8	9	10	11	12	13	CPLMTC	Pts	Ref
2022	Nick Loden Racing	29L	Chevy	CRW	HCY	GPS	FCS	TCM	HCY; 4	ACE; 4	MMS	TCM	ACE; 6	SBO; 5	CRW		11th	113	
2023	Nick Loden Racing	43	Chevy	SNM; 12	HCY; 21	ACE; 19	NWS; 37	TCM	DIL	CRW	WKS	HCY; 7	TCM; 13	**SBS**; 1	**TCM**; 15	CRW	15th	152	
2024	Nick Loden Racing	43	Chevy	SNM; 14	HCY; 3	OCS; 2	ACE; 15	**TCM**; 16	CRW		**NWS**; 25	ACE	FLC; 12	SBO; 15	TCM	NWS	13th	179	
2024	Nick Loden Racing	29L	Chevy							HCY; 18							13th	179	
2025	Nick Loden Racing	43	Chevy	AAS	CDL	OCS	ACE	NWS	CRW	HCY; 7	HCY; 12	AND	FLC	SBO	TCM	NWS	31st	65	
2026	Nick Loden Racing	43	Chevy	SNM	NSV	CRW	ACE	NWS	HCY; 23	AND	FLC	TCM	NPS	SBO			73rd	19	

=== ASA STARS National Tour ===
(key) (Bold – Pole position awarded by qualifying time. Italics – Pole position earned by points standings or practice time. * – Most laps led. ** – All laps led.)

ASA STARS National Tour results
Year	Team	No.	Make	1	2	3	4	5	6	7	8	9	10	11	12	ASNTC	Pts	Ref
2025	Nick Loden	43	N/A	NSM	FIF	DOM	HCY; 19	NPS	MAD	SLG	AND	OWO	TOL	WIN	NSV	65th	33	

=== IHRA Late Model Sportsman Series ===
(key) (Bold – Pole position awarded by qualifying time. Italics – Pole position earned by points standings or practice time. * – Most laps led. ** – All laps led.)

IHRA Late Model Sportsman Series
Year	Team	No.	Make	1	2	3	ISCSS	Pts	Ref
2026	Nick Loden Racing	43	N/A	DUB; 15	CDL; 13*	AND; 9	6th	113	

=== IHRA Pro Late Model Series ===
(key) (Bold – Pole position awarded by qualifying time. Italics – Pole position earned by points standings or practice time. * – Most laps led. ** – All laps led.)

IHRA Pro Late Model Series
Year	Team	No.	Make	1	2	3	ISCSS	Pts	Ref
2026	Nick Loden Racing	43	N/A	DUB; 2	CDL; 2*	AND; 2	1st	140	
