= Carson Brown =

American racing driver (born 2008)

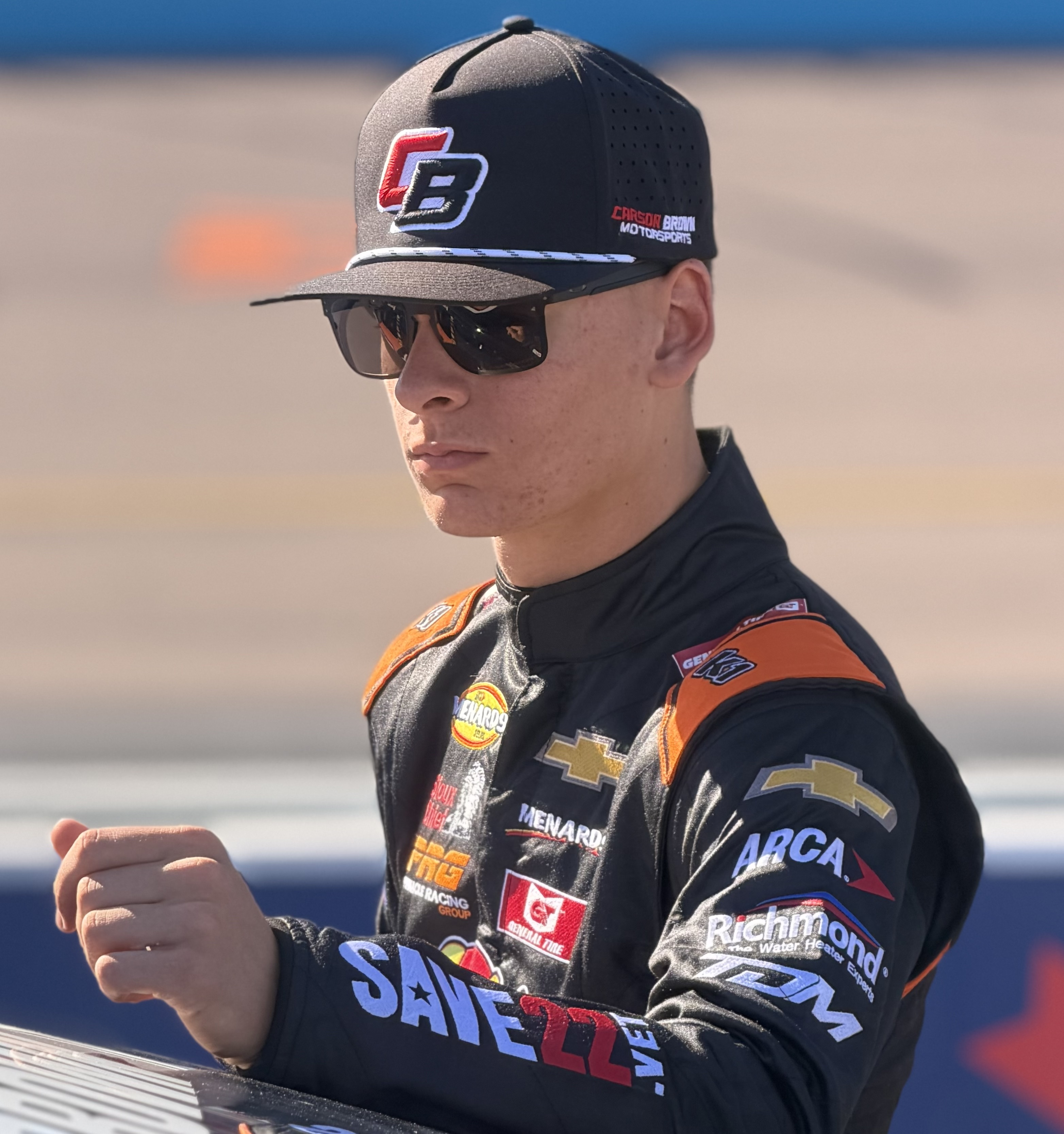
- Brown at Phoenix Raceway in 2025
- Born: Carson Michael Brown; July 13, 2008 (age 18); New London, North Carolina, U.S.
- Achievements: 2022 INEX Cook Out Summer Shootout Semi-Pro Champion; 2026 ASA STARS National Tour Champion
- Awards: 2025 ASA STARS National Tour Rookie of the Year

NASCAR O'Reilly Auto Parts Series career
- 2 races run over 1 year
- Car no., team: No. 2 (Richard Childress Racing)
- 2026 position: 46th
- Best finish: 46th (2026)
- First race: 2026 Hy-Vee PERKS 250 (Iowa)
- Last race: 2026 Blue Cross NC 300 (Charlotte)
Wins	Top tens	Poles
0	1	0

ARCA Menards Series career
- 13 races run over 1 year
- Best finish: 8th (2026)
- First race: 2026 General Tire 150 (Phoenix)
- Last race: 2026 Menards 150 (Kansas)
- First win: 2026 General Tire 150 (Phoenix)
- Last win: 2026 Menards 150 (Kansas)
Wins	Top tens	Poles
4	12	6

ARCA Menards Series East career
- 8 races run over 2 years
- Best finish: 6th (2026)
- First race: 2025 Pensacola 150 (Pensacola)
- Last race: 2026 Bush's Best 200 (Bristol)
- First win: 2026 Bush's Best 200 (Bristol)
Wins	Top tens	Poles
1	7	3

ARCA Menards Series West career
- 2 races run over 2 years
- Best finish: 39th (2026)
- First race: 2025 Desert Diamond Casino West Valley 100 (Phoenix)
- Last race: 2026 General Tire 150 (Phoenix)
- First win: 2026 General Tire 150 (Phoenix)
Wins	Top tens	Poles
1	2	1
- Statistics up to date as of November 7, 2026.

Carson Michael Brown (born July 13, 2008) is an American professional stock car racing and dirt track racing driver. He competes full-time in the NASCAR O'Reilly Auto Parts Series, driving the No. 2 Chevrolet Camaro SS for Richard Childress Racing.

Brown has previously competed in series such as the World Series of Asphalt Stock Car Racing, the INEX Summer Shootout, the CARS Late Model Stock Tour, and the ASA STARS National Tour.

== Racing career ==
Brown first started racing at the age of ten, where he raced in bandoleros and legends cars.

In 2023, Brown began to compete in Pro Late Models, winning in his second start in the category at the World Series of Asphalt Stock Car Racing at New Smyrna Speedway. He also competed in the first eight races of the CARS Tour in the LMSC category, driving for Cook Racing Technologies.

In 2025, Brown ran full-time in the ASA STARS National Tour for Anthony Campi Racing, where he won one race at Madison International Speedway, and was awarded rookie of the year honors. Brown ran full-time in both the CARS Late Model Stock Car Tour for Lee Pulliam Performance, where he finished seventh in the points despite missing two races, and the ASA STARS National Tour for Anthony Campi Racing in 2026, where he won six races to win the championship.

On November 17, 2025, it was revealed that Brown would join Richard Childress Racing as a development driver.

=== ARCA Menards Series ===
In 2025, it was announced that Brown would make his ARCA Menards Series East debut at Five Flags Speedway, driving the No. 4 Chevrolet for Hettinger Racing. He started and finished on the lead lap in sixth place. He also made his debut in the ARCA Menards Series West at the season ending race at Phoenix Raceway, driving the No. 28 Chevrolet for Pinnacle Racing Group, where he finished in second place behind race winner Brent Crews.

On December 17, 2025, it was announced that Brown would run the majority of the ARCA Menards Series schedule, as well as full-time in the ARCA Menards Series East, driving the No. 28 for PRG. He would also participate with the team in the pre-season test for the series at Daytona International Speedway, where he set the 20th quickest time between the two sessions held. He won the ARCA / ARCA West combination race at Phoenix and the standalone events at DuQuoin, Bristol and the finale at Kansas.

=== NASCAR O'Reilly Auto Parts Series ===
Brown's No. 32 car at Charlotte Motor Speedway in 2026

On August 3, 2026, it was announced that Brown would make his debut in the NASCAR O'Reilly Auto Parts Series at Iowa Speedway, driving the No. 32 Chevrolet for Jordan Anderson Racing, where he finished in 15th. He made another start with the team later that year at Charlotte, where he finished in fifth place.

On August 26, 2026, it was announced that Brown will drive full-time in the NASCAR O'Reilly Auto Parts Series for Richard Childress Racing in the No. 2 Chevrolet for the 2027 season.

== Motorsports career results ==
=== Racing career summary ===
Season	Series	Team	Races	Wins	Top 5	Top 10	Points	Position
2023	CARS Late Model Stock Car Tour	Cook Racing Technologies	8	0	0	0	96	25th
2025	ASA STARS National Tour	Anthony Campi Racing	12	1	7	9	779	**2nd**
2025	ARCA Menards Series West	Pinnacle Racing Group	1	0	1	1	42	42nd
2025	ARCA Menards Series East	Hettinger Racing	1	0	0	1	38	51st
2026	ASA STARS National Tour	Anthony Campi Racing	10	5	9	9	944	**1st**
2026	CARS Late Model Stock Car Tour	Lee Pulliam Performance	12	0	4	9	400	7th
2026	ARCA Menards Series West	Pinnacle Racing Group	1	1	1	1	49	39th
2026	ARCA Menards Series East	Pinnacle Racing Group	7	0	5	6	332	6th
2026	ARCA Menards Series	Pinnacle Racing Group	13	2	11	12	600	8th
2026	NASCAR O'Reilly Auto Parts Series	Jordan Anderson Racing	2	0	1	1	54	46th
2027	NASCAR O'Reilly Auto Parts Series	Richard Childress Racing					TBD	TBD

^{†} As Brown was a guest driver, he was ineligible for championship points.

=== NASCAR ===
(key) (Bold – Pole position awarded by qualifying time. Italics – Pole position earned by points standings or practice time. * – Most laps led. ** – All laps led.)

==== O'Reilly Auto Parts Series ====
NASCAR O'Reilly Auto Parts Series results
Year	Team	No.	Make	1	2	3	4	5	6	7	8	9	10	11	12	13	14	15	16	17	18	19	20	21	22	23	24	25	26	27	28	29	30	31	32	33	NOAPSC	Pts	Ref
2026	Jordan Anderson Racing	32	Chevy	DAY	ATL	COA	PHO	LVS	DAR	MAR	CAR	BRI	KAN	TAL	TEX	GLN	DOV	CLT	NSH	POC	COR	SON	CHI	ATL	IND	IOW; 15	DAY	DAR	GTW	BRI	LVS	CLT; 5	PHO	TAL	MAR	HOM	46th	54	

^{*} Season still in progress
^{1} Ineligible for series points

=== ARCA Menards Series ===
(key) (Bold – Pole position awarded by qualifying time. Italics – Pole position earned by points standings or practice time. * – Most laps led. ** – All laps led.)

ARCA Menards Series results
Year	Team	No.	Make	1	2	3	4	5	6	7	8	9	10	11	12	13	14	15	16	17	18	19	20	AMSC	Pts	Ref
2026	Pinnacle Racing Group	28	Chevy	DAY	**PHO**; 1**	KAN	TAL	GLN; 2	TOL; 3	MCH	POC; 3	BER	ELK	CHI	**LRP**; 3	**IRP**; 3*	IOW; 2	ISF; 13	**MAD**; 2	**DSF**; 1*	SLM; 10	**BRI**; 1**	KAN; 1	8th	600	

==== ARCA Menards Series East ====
ARCA Menards Series East results
Year	Team	No.	Make	1	2	3	4	5	6	7	8	AMSEC	Pts	Ref
2025	Hettinger Racing	4	Chevy	FIF; 6	CAR	NSV	FRS	DOV	IRP	IOW	BRI	51st	38	
2026	Pinnacle Racing Group	28	Chevy	HCY	CAR; 2	NSV; 9	TOL; 3	**IRP**; 3*	**FRS**; 18	IOW; 2	**BRI**; 1**	6th	332	

==== ARCA Menards Series West ====
ARCA Menards Series West results
Year	Team	No.	Make	1	2	3	4	5	6	7	8	9	10	11	12	13	AMSWC	Pts	Ref
2025	Pinnacle Racing Group	28	Chevy	KER	PHO	TUC	CNS	KER	SON	TRI	PIR	AAS	MAD	LVS	PHO; 2		42nd	42	
2026	Pinnacle Racing Group	28	Chevy	KER	**PHO**; 1**	TUC	SHA	CNS	TRI	SON	PIR	AAS	MAD	LVS	PHO	KER	39th	49	

=== CARS Late Model Stock Car Tour ===
(key) (Bold – Pole position awarded by qualifying time. Italics – Pole position earned by points standings or practice time. * – Most laps led. ** – All laps led.)

CARS Late Model Stock Car Tour results
Year	Team	No.	Make	1	2	3	4	5	6	7	8	9	10	11	12	13	14	15	16	CLMSCTC	Pts	Ref
2023	Cook Racing Technologies	42	Chevy	SNM; 25	FLC; 15	HCY; 24	ACE; 21	NWS; 22	LGY; 25	DOM; 16	CRW; 20	HCY	ACE	TCM	WKS	AAS	SBO	TCM	CRW	25th	96	
2026	Lee Pulliam Performance	5	Chevy	SNM; 10	WCS; 13	NSV; 7	CRW; 8	ACE; 26	LGY; 4	**DOM**; 4*	NWS; 10	HCY	AND; 11	FLC; 2	TCM	NPS; 3	SBO; 9			7th	400	

=== ASA STARS National Tour ===
(key) (Bold – Pole position awarded by qualifying time. Italics – Pole position earned by points standings or practice time. * – Most laps led. ** – All laps led.)

ASA STARS National Tour results
Year	Team	No.	Make	1	2	3	4	5	6	7	8	9	10	11	12	ASNTC	Pts	Ref
2025	Anthony Campi Racing	81	Chevy	NSM; 23	**FIF**; 26	**DOM**; 4*	HCY; 4	**NPS**; 4	MAD; 1*	SLG; 19	AND; 4	OWO; 4	TOL; 6	WIN; 6	NSV; 2	2nd	779	
2026	Anthony Campi Racing	81	Chevy	NSM; 1*	FIF; 1*	**HCY**; 2*	SLG; 1	MAD; 2	NPS; 1	OWO; 4	TRI; 2*	WIN; 1*	NSV; 11	**NSM**; 1**		1st	944	
