= Cole Butcher =

Canadian racing driver (born 1996)

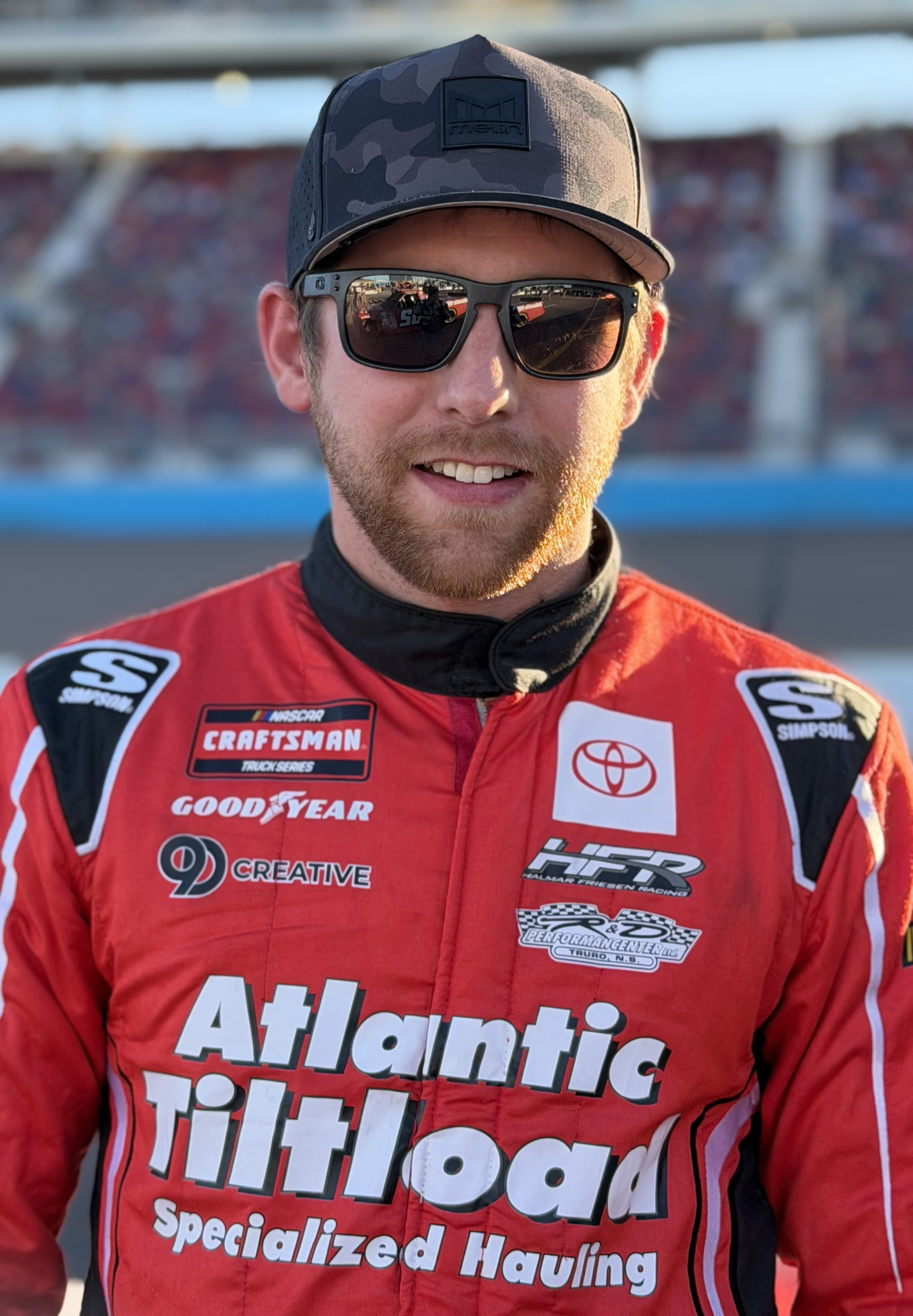
- Butcher at Phoenix Raceway in 2025
- Born: August 31, 1996 (age 30); Porters Lake, Nova Scotia, Canada
- Achievements: 2016, 2018 East Coast International Pro Stock Tour Champion; 2025 ASA STARS National Tour Champion; 2024 Winchester 400 Winner; 2025 Florida Governor's Cup Winner; 2023, 2025 Redbud 400 Winner; 2022, 2023 Oxford 250 Winner; 2016, 2017 Toromont Cat 250 Winner

NASCAR FedEx Freight Truck Series career
- 27 races run over 2 years
- Truck no., team: No. 13 (ThorSport Racing)
- 2026 position: 18th
- Best finish: 18th (2026)
- First race: 2025 UNOH 250 (Bristol)
- Last race: 2026 Craftsman 200 (Homestead)
Wins	Top tens	Poles
0	1	0
- Statistics up to date as of November 6, 2026.

Cole Butcher (born August 31, 1996) is a Canadian professional stock car racing driver. He competes full-time in the NASCAR Craftsman Truck Series, driving the No. 13 Ford F-150 for ThorSport Racing.

== Racing career ==
Butcher has previously competed in series such as the CARS Pro Late Model Tour, where he won a race at Hickory Motor Speedway in 2023, the ASA STARS National Tour, where he won the championship in 2025, and has seven wins as of 2026, the ASA CRA Super Series, the NASCAR Weekly Series, and the ASA Southern Super Series. He is also a former winner of the Oxford 250, having previously won it in 2022 and 2023.

On August 10, 2025, it was announced that Butcher would attempt to make his debut in the NASCAR Craftsman Truck Series at Bristol Motor Speedway, driving the No. 62 Toyota for Halmar Friesen Racing. He started in 21st and finished two laps down in 23rd. In October of that year, it was revealed that Butcher would run with the team at Phoenix Raceway.

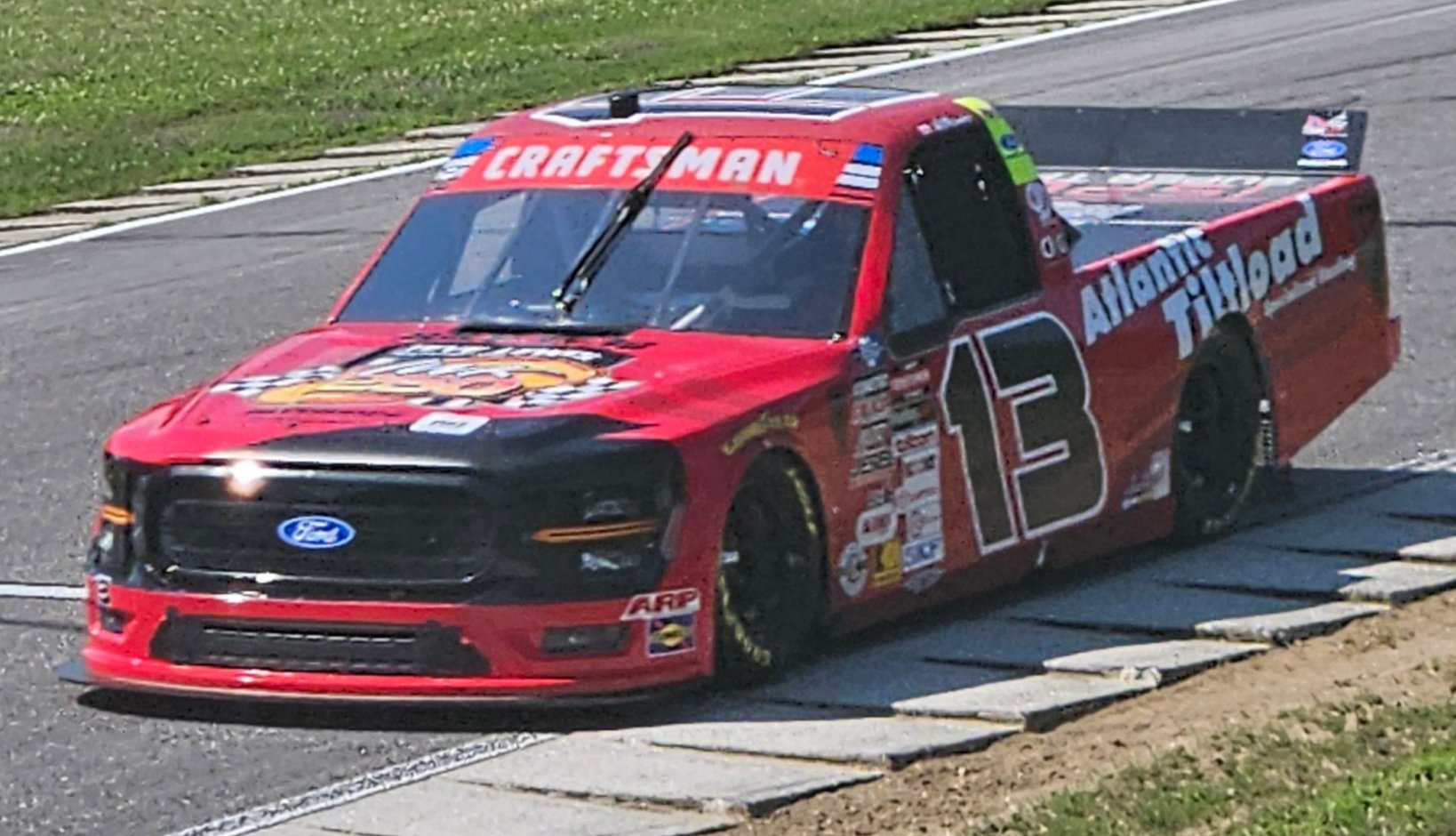
Butcher's No. 13 truck at Lime Rock Park in 2026.

In 2026, it was revealed that Butcher would participate in the pre-season test for the ARCA Menards Series at Daytona International Speedway, driving the No. 30 Ford for Rette Jones Racing, where he set the ninth quickest time between the two sessions held. A week later, it was announced that he will run full-time in the Truck Series for the 2026 season, driving the No. 13 Ford for ThorSport Racing.

== Personal life ==
Butcher is the brother of Jarrett Butcher, who also competes in racing. He is also the son of Darrin and Ann Butcher, the owners of Atlantic Tiltload, and married to Amber Butcher (Vandenberg) and together had a son named Brody Butcher.

== Motorsports career results ==
=== Racing career summary ===
Season	Series	Team	Races	Wins	Top 5	Top 10	Points	Position
2023	ASA STARS National Tour	Wilson Motorsports	10	1	6	8	668	**2nd**
2023	CARS Pro Late Model Tour	Wilson Motorsports	5	1	5	5	157	11th
2024	ASA STARS National Tour	Wilson Motorsports	8	3	4	6	572	**3rd**
2025	ASA STARS National Tour	Wilson Motorsports	12	4	8	9	894	**1st**
2025	NASCAR Craftsman Truck Series	Halmar Friesen Racing	2	0	0	0	28	52nd
2026	ASA STARS National Tour	Bob Lyon	4	0	1	2	214*	14th*
2026	NASCAR Craftsman Truck Series	ThorSport Racing	25	0	0	1	378	18th

=== NASCAR ===
(key) (Bold – Pole position awarded by qualifying time. Italics – Pole position earned by points standings or practice time. * – Most laps led.)

==== Craftsman Truck Series ====
NASCAR Craftsman Truck Series results
Year	Team	No.	Make	1	2	3	4	5	6	7	8	9	10	11	12	13	14	15	16	17	18	19	20	21	22	23	24	25	NCTC	Pts	Ref
2025	Halmar Friesen Racing	62	Toyota	DAY	ATL	LVS	HOM	MAR	BRI	CAR	TEX	KAN	NWS	CLT	NSH	MCH	POC	LRP	IRP	GLN	RCH	DAR	BRI; 23	NHA	ROV	TAL	MAR	PHO; 23	52nd	28	
2026	ThorSport Racing	13	Ford	DAY; 14	ATL; 31	STP; 14	DAR; 28	CAR; 10	BRI; 28	TEX; 35	GLN; 35	DOV; 33	CLT; 26	NSH; 16	MCH; 33	COR; 15	LRP; 11	NWS; 22	IRP; 23	RCH; 22	NHA; 17	BRI; 28	KAN; 12	CLT; 18	PHO; 18	TAL; 29	MAR; 22	HOM; 22	18th	378	

^{*} Season still in progress
^{1} Ineligible for series points

=== CARS Pro Late Model Tour ===
(key)

CARS Pro Late Model Tour results
Year	Team	No.	Make	1	2	3	4	5	6	7	8	9	10	11	12	13	CPLMTC	Pts	Ref
2023	Wilson Motorsports	53	Toyota	SNM	HCY	ACE	NWS	TCM; 4	DIL								11th	157	
2023	Wilson Motorsports	28	Toyota							CRW; 4	WKS	HCY; 1**	TCM; 3	SBO; 2	TCM	CRW	11th	157	

=== ASA STARS National Tour ===
(key) (Bold – Pole position awarded by qualifying time. Italics – Pole position earned by points standings or practice time. * – Most laps led. ** – All laps led.)

ASA STARS National Tour results
Year	Team	No.	Make	1	2	3	4	5	6	7	8	9	10	11	12	ASNTC	Pts	Ref
2023	Wilson Motorsports	28B	Toyota	FIF; 4	MAD; 14					WIR; 8			NSV; 22			2nd	668	
2023	Wilson Motorsports	28	Toyota			NWS; 8		MLW; 2	AND; 1		**TOL**; 2*	**WIN**; 2*				2nd	668	
2023	Wilson Motorsports	53	Toyota				HCY; 3									2nd	668	
2024	Wilson Motorsports	28B	Toyota	NSM; 9	FIF; 1*											3rd	572	
2024	Wilson Motorsports	28	Toyota			HCY; 1	MAD; 14	MLW; 2	**AND**; 7	OWO	TOL	WIN; 1	NSV; 14			3rd	572	
2025	Wilson Motorsports	28	Toyota	NSM; 11	FIF; 1*	DOM; 1*	HCY; 6*	NPS; 11	MAD; 2	SLG; 1	AND; 1	OWO; 3	TOL; 2		NSV; 14	1st	894	
2025	Wilson Motorsports	28C	Toyota											WIN; 3		1st	894	
2026	Bob Lyon	44	Ford	NSM	FIF; 3	HCY	SLG	MAD	NPS	OWO	TRI; 7	WIN; 12	NSV; 26	NSM		-*	-*	
