= Dustin Smith (racing driver) =

American racing driver

- Born: October 24, 1997 (age 29) Mobile, Alabama, U.S.

CARS Pro Late Model Tour career
- Debut season: 2023
- Years active: 2023
- Starts: 1
- Championships: 0
- Wins: 0
- Poles: 0
- Best finish: 70th in 2023
- Statistics up to date as of March 20, 2026.

Dustin Smith (born October 24, 1997) is an American professional stock car racing driver. He currently competes in the ASA STARS National Tour, driving the No. 33 Chevrolet for Smith Motorsports.

In 2025, it was revealed that Smith would participate in the pre-season test for the ARCA Menards Series at Daytona International Speedway, driving the No. 9S Ford for Fast Track Racing, where he set the 42nd quickest time overall among all drivers.

Smith has also competed in series such as the CARS Pro Late Model Tour, the ASA Southern Super Series, the ASA CRA Super Series, and the World Series of Asphalt Stock Car Racing. and is a former winner and champion of the Southern Pro Series, having won the title in 2025.

== Motorsports results ==
=== Stock car career summary ===
Season	Series	Team	Races	Wins	Top 5	Top 10	Points	Position
2023	ASA STARS National Tour	Smith Motorsports	3	0	0	1	115	33rd
2023	CARS Pro Late Model Tour	Smith Motorsports	1	0	0	0	8	70th
2024	ASA STARS National Tour	Smith Motorsports	2	0	0	0	69	37th
2025	ASA STARS National Tour	Smith Motorsports	2	0	0	0	58	45th
2026	ASA STARS National Tour	Smith Motorsports	1	0	0	0		

=== CARS Pro Late Model Tour ===
(key)

CARS Pro Late Model Tour results
Year	Team	No.	Make	1	2	3	4	5	6	7	8	9	10	11	12	13	CPLMTC	Pts	Ref
2023	Smith Motorsports	33	Chevy	SNM	HCY	ACE	NWS; 25	TCM	DIL	CRW	WKS	HCY	FLC	SBO	TCM	CRW	70th	8	

=== ASA STARS National Tour ===
(key) (Bold – Pole position awarded by qualifying time. Italics – Pole position earned by points standings or practice time. * – Most laps led. ** – All laps led.)

ASA STARS National Tour results
Year	Team	No.	Make	1	2	3	4	5	6	7	8	9	10	11	12	ASNTC	Pts	Ref
2023	Smith Motorsports	33S	Chevy	FIF; 33	MAD	NWS; DNQ							NSV; 6			33rd	115	
2023	Smith Motorsports	33	Chevy				HCY; 17	MLW	AND	WIR	TOL	WIN				33rd	115	
2024	Smith Motorsports	33S	Chevy	NSM	FIF; 22	HCY; 13	MAD	MLW	AND	OWO	TOL	WIN	NSV			37th	69	
2025	Smith Motorsports	33S	Chevy	NSM; 24												45th	58	
2025	Smith Motorsports	112	Chevy		FIF; 21	DOM	HCY	NPS	MAD	SLG	AND	OWO	TOL	WIN	NSV	45th	58	
2026	Smith Motorsports	33	Chevy	NSM	**FIF**; 19	HCY	SLG	MAD	NPS	OWO	TRI	WIN	NSV	NSM		-*	-*	
