= Anthony Bello =

American racing driver (born 2005)

- Nationality: American
- Born: November 11, 2005 (age 21) Newtown, Connecticut, U.S.

NASCAR Whelen Modified Tour career
- Debut season: 2023
- Years active: 2023
- Starts: 5
- Championships: 0
- Wins: 0
- Poles: 0
- Best finish: 34th in 2023
- Statistics up to date as of April 22, 2025.

Anthony Bello (born November 11, 2005) is an American professional stock car racing driver who has previously competed in the NASCAR Whelen Modified Tour and the SMART Modified Tour.

Bello has also competed in series such as the ACT Late Model Tour, the PASS North Super Late Model Series, the Granite State Pro Stock Series, and the Monaco Modified Tri-Track Series.

== Motorsports results ==
=== Stock car career summary ===
Season	Series	Team	Races	Wins	Top 5	Top 10	Points	Position
2022	SMART Modified Tour	Paul French	4	0	0	0	35	34th
2023	NASCAR Whelen Modified Tour	Paul French	1	0	0	0	110	34th
2023	NASCAR Whelen Modified Tour	John Bello	4	0	0	0	110	34th
2024	SMART Modified Tour	Hill Enterprises	14	0	2	5	410	8th
2025	SMART Modified Tour	Paul French	4	0	1	2	105	24th
2026	ASA STARS National Tour	Fetcho Motorsports	1	0	0	0		
2026	CARS Pro Late Model Tour	Fetcho Motorsports	1	0	0	0	16	77th

=== NASCAR ===
(key) (Bold – Pole position awarded by qualifying time. Italics – Pole position earned by points standings or practice time. * – Most laps led.)

==== Whelen Modified Tour ====
NASCAR Whelen Modified Tour results
Year	Car owner	No.	Make	1	2	3	4	5	6	7	8	9	10	11	12	13	14	15	16	17	18	NWMTC	Pts	Ref
2023	Paul French	12	Chevy	NSM; 31	RCH	MON	RIV	LEE	SEE	RIV	WAL											34th	110	
2023	John Bello	21	Chevy									NHA; 24	LMP	THO; 22	LGY	OSW	MON	RIV	NWS	THO; 12	MAR; 21	34th	110	

=== CARS Pro Late Model Tour ===
(key)

CARS Pro Late Model Tour results
Year	Team	No.	Make	1	2	3	4	5	6	7	8	9	10	11	CPLMTC	Pts	Ref
2026	Fetcho Motorsports	51B	N/A	SNM	NSV; 26	CRW	ACE	NWS	HCY	AND	FLC	TCM	NPS	SBO	77th	16	

=== SMART Modified Tour ===
SMART Modified Tour results
Year	Car owner	No.	Make	1	2	3	4	5	6	7	8	9	10	11	12	13	14	SMTC	Pts	Ref
2022	Paul French	12	N/A	FLO	SNM	CRW; 12	SBO	FCS										34th	35	
2022	Paul French	2PA	N/A						CRW; 15	NWS; 12	NWS; 11	CAR	DOM	HCY	TRI	PUL		34th	35	
2024	Hill Enterprises	79	N/A	FLO; 13	CRW; 12	SBO; 5	TRI; 11	ROU; 7	HCY; 14	FCS; 16	CRW; 8	JAC; 23	CAR; 12	CRW; 3	DOM; 16	SBO; 9	NWS; 17	8th	410	
2025	Paul French	12PA	N/A	FLO	AND	SBO; 30	ROU	HCY	FCS	CRW; 7	CPS	CAR	CRW	DOM; 2	FCS	TRI	NWS; 20	24th	105	

=== ASA STARS National Tour ===
(key) (Bold – Pole position awarded by qualifying time. Italics – Pole position earned by points standings or practice time. * – Most laps led. ** – All laps led.)

ASA STARS National Tour results
Year	Team	No.	Make	1	2	3	4	5	6	7	8	9	10	11	ASNTC	Pts	Ref
2026	Fetcho Motorsports	51	Chevy	NSM; 24	FIF	HCY	SLG	MAD	NPS	OWO	TRI	WIN	NSV	NSM	-*	-*	
