= 2026 ASA STARS National Tour =

4th season of the ASA STARS National Tour

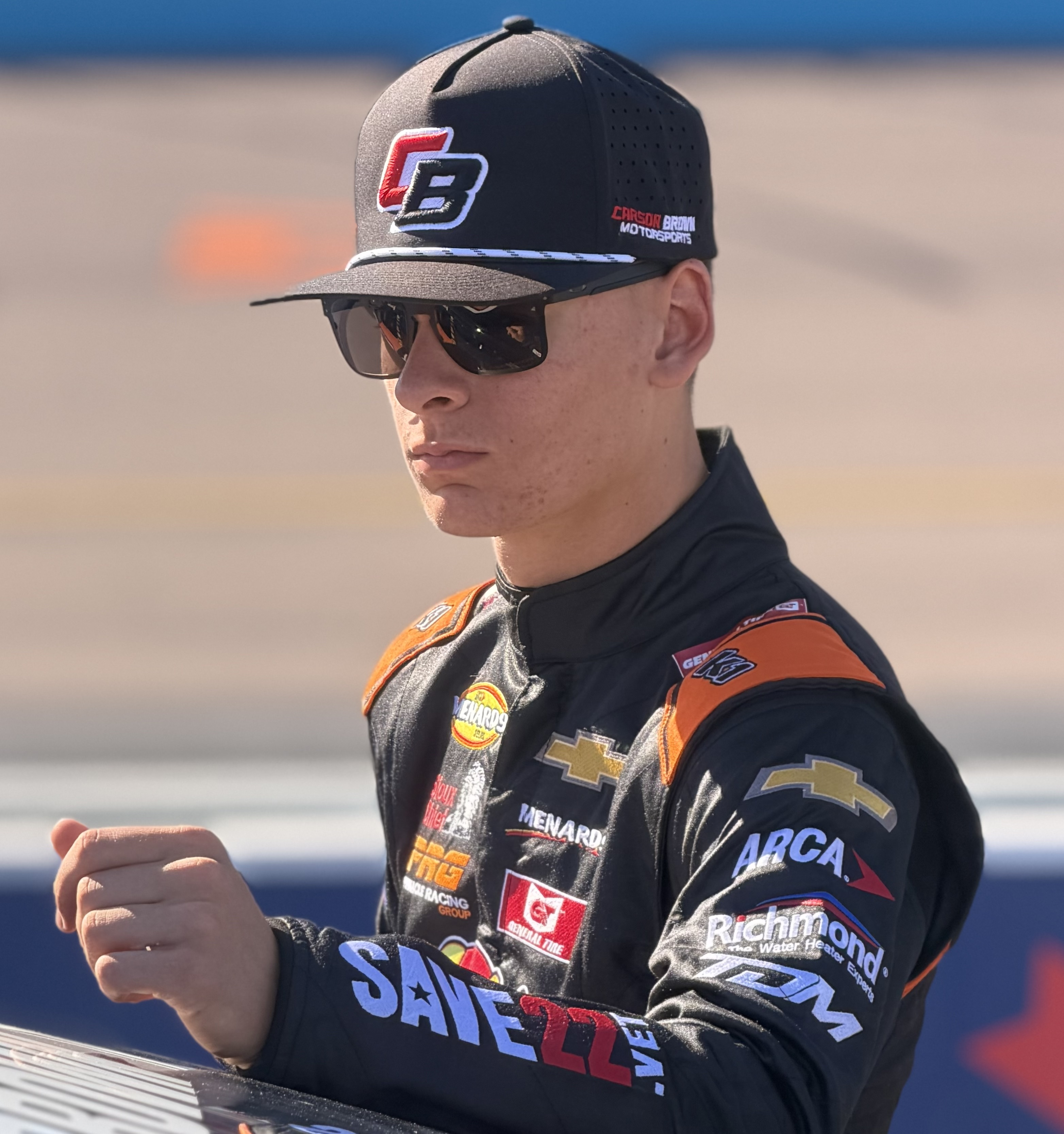
Carson Brown, the 2026 ASA STARS National Tour champion

The 2026 Appalachian Sucker Punch ASA STARS National Tour was the 4th and final season of the ASA STARS National Tour, a stock car racing series. It began at New Smyrna Speedway with the SIG Sauer Academy Clyde Hart Memorial 200 on February 10, and ended at the same track with the Florida Governor’s Cup on November 15.

Cole Butcher entered the season as the defending champion, but did not return full-time for a second championship, as he moved up the NASCAR Craftsman Truck Series full-time, driving for ThorSport Racing. Carson Brown went on to win his first series championship.

This season will be the last under the ASA STARS National Tour banner, as the series will become the CARS STARS Super Tour following the merging of ASA and the CARS Tour West.

== Schedule ==
Notes: The race names and title sponsors are subject to change. Not all title sponsors/names of races have been announced for 2026. For the races where a 2026 name and title sponsor has yet to be announced, the title sponsors/names of those races in 2025 are listed and marked with star.

No.	Race title	Track	Date
1	SIG Sauer Academy Clyde Hart Memorial 200	New Smyrna Speedway, New Smyrna Beach, Florida	February 10
2	Sunshine State 200	Five Flags Speedway, Pensacola, Florida	March 14
3	Tar Heel 250	Hickory Motor Speedway, Hickory, North Carolina	May 21
4	Badger State 325	Slinger Speedway, Slinger, Wisconsin	June 21
5	Capital 200 presented by Sucker Punch	Madison International Speedway, Oregon, Wisconsin	June 23
6	HickoryHillTN.com 325	Newport Speedway, Newport, Tennessee	July 25
7	Michigan 300	Owosso Speedway, Ovid, Michigan	August 26
8	ebb Logistics 250	Tri-County Motor Speedway, Hudson, North Carolina	September 9
9	Winchester 400	Winchester Speedway, Winchester, Indiana	October 10
10	All American 400	Nashville Fairgrounds Speedway, Nashville, Tennessee	November 8
11	Florida Governor’s Cup	New Smyrna Speedway, New Smyrna Beach, Florida	November 15

== Results and standings ==
=== Races ===
No.	Race	Fastest qualifier	Most laps led	Winning driver
1	SIG Sauer Academy Clyde Hart Memorial 200	Kyle Steckly	Carson Brown	Carson Brown
2	Sunshine State 200	Dustin Smith	Carson Brown	Carson Brown
3	Tar Heel 250	Carson Brown	Carson Brown	Caden Kvapil
4	Badger State 325	Ty Majeski	Ty Majeski	Carson Brown
5	Capital 200 presented by Sucker Punch	Luke Fenhaus	Tristan McKee	Kyle Steckly
6	HickoryHillTN.com 325	Matt Craig	Matt Craig	Carson Brown
7	Michigan 300	Keelan Harvick	Keelan Harvick	Keelan Harvick
8	ebb Logistics 250	Keelan Harvick	Carson Brown	Christopher Bell
9	Winchester 400	Dawson Sutton	Carson Brown	Carson Brown
10	All American 400	Dawson Sutton	Dawson Sutton	Stephen Nasse
11	Florida Governor’s Cup	Carson Brown	Carson Brown	Carson Brown

=== Drivers' championship ===
(key) Bold - Pole position awarded by time. Italics - Pole position set by final practice results or rainout. * – Most laps led.

Pos	Driver	NSM	FIF	HCY	SLG	MAD	NPS	OWO	TRI	WIN	NSV	NSM	Points
1	Carson Brown	1*	1*	**2***	1	2	1	4	2*	1*	11	**1****	944
2	Kyle Steckly	**13**	2	3	5	1	7	2	22	7	5	12	679
3	Jade Avedisian	7	5	15	8	16	15	3	6	9	3	4	592
4	Tristan McKee	3	7	7	6	6*	14	13	20	4	9	Wth	574
5	Stephen Nasse	9	9	13	3	18	13			2	1	7	521
6	Derek Thorn	18	21	6	11	5	8	10	15	8	18	21	512
7	Chase Pinsonneault	20	8	4	9	17	12	11	12	6	16	9	508
8	Derek Kraus	14	17	16	4	13	16	12	5	11	17	5	501
9	Kasey Kleyn	19	23	Wth	12	21	3	7	13	10	8	16	444
10	Casey Roderick	26	6	21	13	11	6	8	4	Wth	13		406
11	Matt Craig	11	15	9			**2***		14		2		335
12	George Phillips	15	11	23			4		16		6	6	332
13	Isaac Kitzmiller	DNQ	16	12	10	9		14	17				250
14	Ty Majeski				**2***	3						2	247
15	Spencer Davis	4	10	8								3	230
16	Cole Butcher		3						7	12	26		214
17	Keelan Harvick						10	**1***	**21**				212
18	Dawson Sutton	2								**15**	**10***		207
19	Ty Fredrickson	22	26	Wth	DNS	4			3				178
20	Conner Jones	8	24	24					8				159
21	Penn Sauter					7		9			24		145
22	Bubba Pollard	31	22	25				15	Wth				136
23	Michael Simko							6		13	20		131
24	Brandon Lopez	DNQ		18					18		12		128
25	Austin Nason				14	10					29		123
26	Dylan Fetcho		20						19		7		117
27	Jett Noland		18	17					11		Wth		115
28	Jake Finch	17	14								22		105
29	Hudson Bulger	25	12									17	102
30	Gabe Sommers	28				12					27		102
31	Cory Hall	6		10									100
32	Jake Garcia		4								15		98
33	Nicholas Naugle	21	25									15	96
34	William Sawalich	12		5									95
35	Justin Mondeik				7	19							89
36	Levon Van Der Geest				15	8							87
37	Christopher Bell								1				87
38	Colby Howard			11			9						86
39	Dylan Bates						5				21		86
40	Max Reaves	23				14							85
41	Brad May	27										8	84
42	Vito Cancilla			19					9				78
43	Caden Kvapil			1									78
44	Treyten Lapcevich										4		78
45	Justin Crider			22			11						74
46	Billy VanMeter	DNQ								3			73
47	Paul Shafer Jr.		13			20							71
48	Gabrielle Grigsby									24		19	61
49	Carson Hocevar	5											59
50	Chase Burda							5		Wth			59
51	Chris Shannon									5			58
52	Dustin Smith		**19**										58
53	Albert Francis							Wth		20	28		56
54	Luke Fenhaus					**15**							51
55	Michael Hinde	10	DNS										48
56	Bobby Good											10	48
57	Brent Crews								10				46
58	Luke Yarbrough											11	41
59	Kaden Honeycutt	16											40
60	Derrick Kelley											13	39
61	Donnie Wilson									14			38
62	Nick Tucker			14									38
63	Buddy Shepherd										14		38
64	Garrett Mitchell											14	38
65	Bryce Miller							16					36
66	J. P. Crabtree									16			36
67	Cody Scott									17			35
68	Jon Beach									18			34
69	Jim Brinkley Jr.											18	34
70	Kyle Crump									19			33
71	Wesley Slimp										19		33
72	Carson Ware			20					Wth				32
73	Anastasia Markovic											20	32
74	Jeff Myers Jr.									21			31
75	Chris Munson									22			30
76	Ryan Herbert											22	30
77	Josh Ebbert									23			29
78	Cole Robie										23		29
79	Nate Smith											23	29
80	Anthony Bello	24											28
81	Dustin Hester											24	28
82	Cole Munson									25			27
83	Ridge Oien										25		27
84	Kyle Benjamin	29											23
85	Kole Raz	30							Wth				22
86	Johnny Brazier										30		22
87	Trey Craig										31		21
88	Hunter Wright	32											20
89	Derek Griffith	DNQ											15
90	R. J. Braun	DNQ											12
91	Cody Brinson	DNQ											5
	George Gorham Jr.											DNS	
	Zack Walker											DNS	
	Dustin Higdon											DNS	
	Chase Elliott			Wth									
	Wes Burton			Wth									
	Tyler Di Legge							Wth					
	Billy Hayes									Wth			
	Casey Johnson											Wth	
	Trenton Henick											Wth	
	Holden Myers											Wth	
Pos	Driver	NSM	FIF	HCY	SLG	MAD	NPS	OWO	TRI	WIN	NSV	NSM	Points

== See also ==
- 2026 NASCAR Cup Series
- 2026 NASCAR O'Reilly Auto Parts Series
- 2026 NASCAR Craftsman Truck Series
- 2026 ARCA Menards Series
- 2026 ARCA Menards Series East
- 2026 ARCA Menards Series West
- 2026 NASCAR Whelen Modified Tour
- 2026 NASCAR Euro Series
- 2026 NASCAR Canada Series
- 2026 NASCAR Brasil Series
- 2026 CARS Tour
- 2026 SMART Modified Tour
