= Eric Gordon (racing driver) =

American racing driver (born 1967)

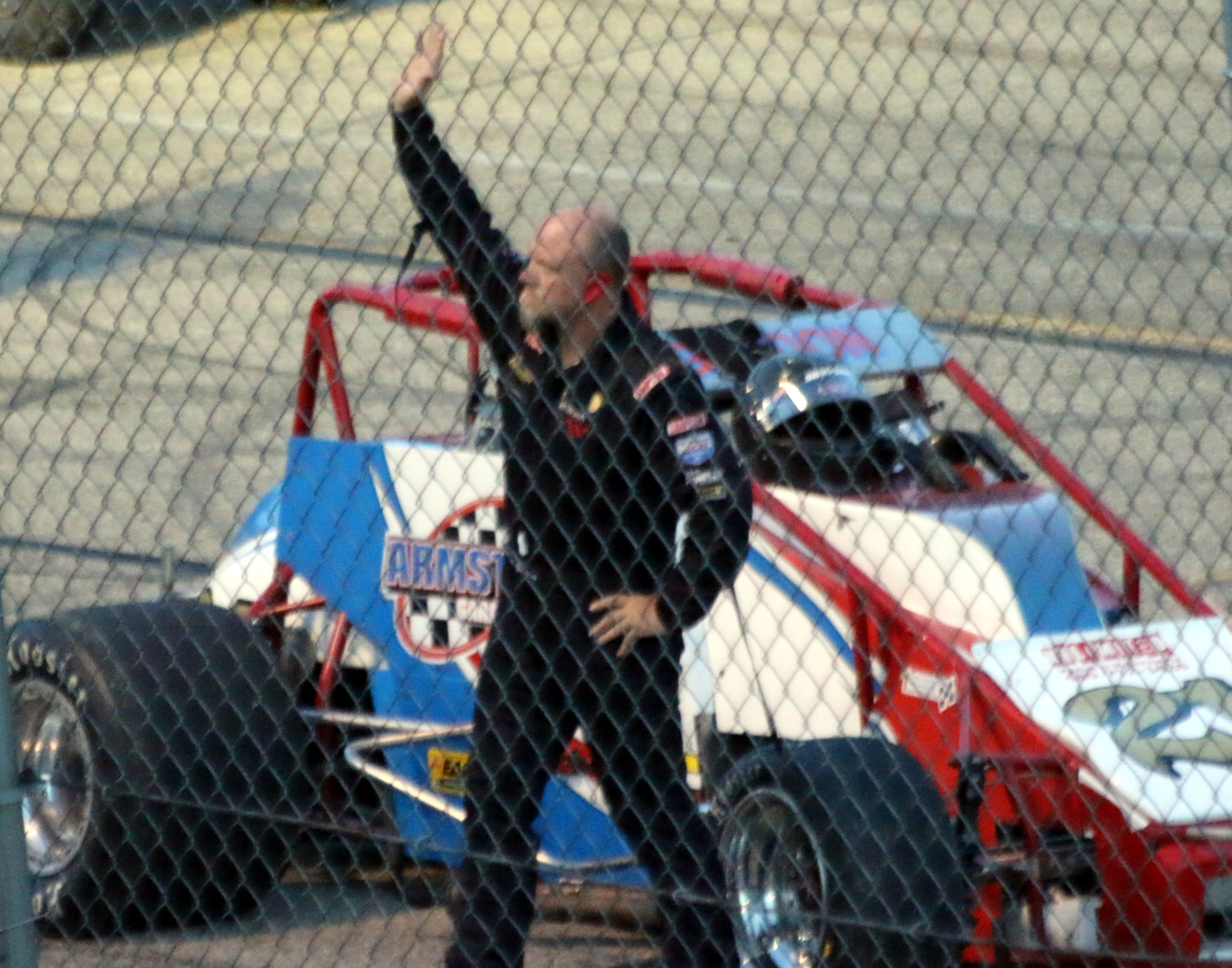
- Gordon in 2018
- Born: November 17, 1967 (age 58); Indianapolis, Indiana, U.S.
- Achievements: 9 time winner of the Little 500 USAC Sprint car race
- Awards: 1989 USAC National Sprint Car Rookie of the Year; 2022 National Sprint Car Hall of Fame inductee

NASCAR O'Reilly Auto Parts Series career
- 1 race run over 1 year
- Best finish: 103rd (1993)
- First race: 1993 Kroger 200 (IRP)
Wins	Top tens	Poles
0	0	0

Eric Gordon (born November 17, 1967) is an American professional race car driver. Gordon raced primarily in the United States Auto Club (USAC) open wheel sprint cars and Silver Crown cars. He finished second in both USAC Sprint and Silver Crown championships in the 1980s and 1990s. Gordon made one NASCAR Busch Series start at Indianapolis Raceway Park. He most recently raced for the full 2021 Silver Crown championship season in the No. 99 car for Brad & Tara Armstrong.

== Racing career ==
=== Open wheel ===
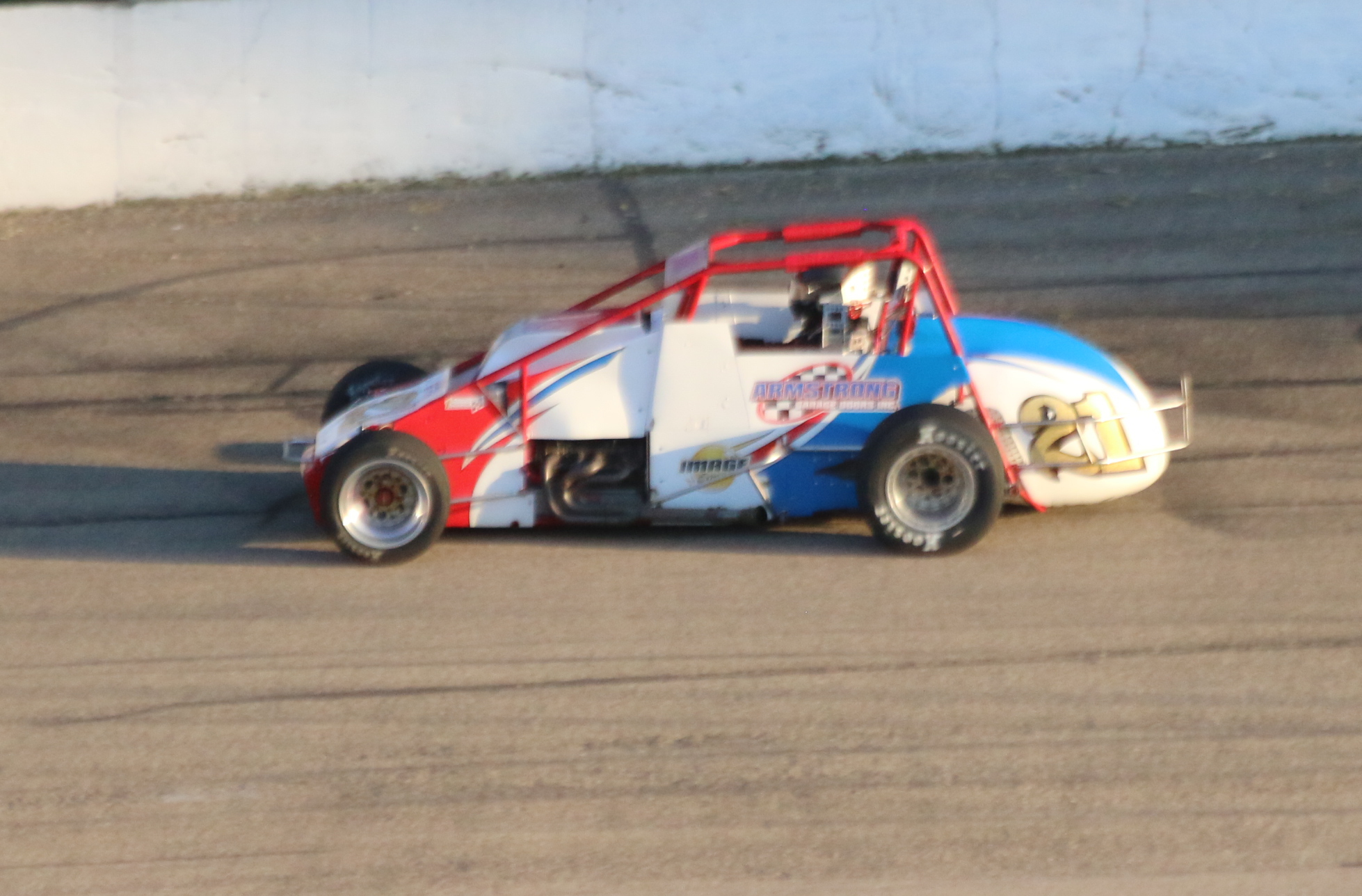
Gordon's 2018 USAC Silver Crown car at Madison

Gordon has finished second in the United States Auto Club (USAC) Sprint car points three times (1989, 1990, 1998) and second in the USAC Silver Crown series once (1990). Gordon won the Little 500 Sprint car race at Anderson Speedway a record nine times in 22 starts. Gordon retired from racing and helped his son to do racing. He didn't race Silver Crown cars from 2012 until resuming in 2018. As of the start of the 2022 season, he has won 13 total USAC Sprint car features.

Gordon also has an Indy Lights start.

=== Stock car ===
Gordon made one NASCAR Busch Series start at Indianapolis Raceway Park in 1993. He has not attempted another NASCAR race since.

== Legacy ==
Gordon was inducted in the National Sprint Car Hall of Fame in 2022.

== Motorsports career results ==
=== NASCAR ===
(key) (Bold – Pole position awarded by qualifying time. Italics – Pole position earned by points standings or practice time. * – Most laps led.)

==== Busch Series ====
NASCAR Busch Series results
Year	Team	No.	Make	1	2	3	4	5	6	7	8	9	10	11	12	13	14	15	16	17	18	19	20	21	22	23	24	25	26	27	28	NBSC	Pts	Ref
1993	Ingram Racing	10	Chevy	DAY	CAR	RCH	DAR	BRI	HCY	ROU	MAR	NZH	CLT	DOV	MYB	GLN	MLW	TAL	IRP; 33	MCH	NHA	BRI	DAR	RCH	DOV	ROU	CLT	MAR	CAR	HCY	ATL	103rd	64	
