= Anderson Speedway =

Racetrack

Coordinates: 40.0887°N 85.696479°W

Anderson Speedway is a quarter mile (400 m) high-banked paved oval racetrack in Anderson, Indiana, United States.

The track hosts the annual Little 500 sprint car race and the Redbud 400 stock car race. Weekly racing features several stock car divisions, Including: Crown Vic Ford Division, Legends, Asphalt Late Models, Street Stocks, Thunder Roadsters, and Front Wheel Drives.

The corners are banked at 17 degrees. The 2010 track record of 10.28 seconds in a winged sprint car was the world record for quarter-mile paved ovals until a sprint car driver qualified at Slinger Speedway in 9.909 seconds in August 2010. The track was originally constructed by Joe Helpling in 1947.

== Redbud 400 ==
The premier stock car race at Anderson is the Redbud 400, a 400-lap super late model race held since 1967. It was sanctioned by the American Speed Association from 1969 to 1999 before the original tour ended. The race joined the ARCA/CRA Super Series in 2001, and was co-sanctioned by the new ASA STARS National Tour from 2023 to 2025. For the 2026 edition, the format was changed into a 200-lap late model race and a 200-lap street stocks race. Originally held in August, the event now typically takes place in mid July since 1998.

The quote, "It's like racing jet fighters in a gym", is attributed to noted short track driver Dick Trickle concerning racing ASA stock cars at the track.

Notable winners include Tiny Lund, Mark Martin, Alan Kulwicki, Dick Trickle, Kyle Busch, Daniel Hemric and Erik Jones, and Carson Hocevar

== Little 500 ==
The track hosts the annual Little 500 presented by UAW on the Saturday of the Memorial Day weekend, the night before the Indianapolis 500. At 500 laps, or 125 miles, the race is unusually long for sprint car races (typically races are between 10 and 50 miles) and is considered one of the premier wingless asphalt sprint car races.

The field consists of 33 cars lined up in eleven rows of three, mimicking the traditional Indy 500 lineup. Likewise, qualifying is held over four consecutive laps. Many eventual Indy 500 drivers competed in the Little 500 over the years. The 70th edition of the Pay Less Little 500 presented by UAW-GM paid out over $125,150 to the field. The 72nd edition, held in 2020, was moved to September because of county governmental regulations.

In 2022, the race became part of the 500 Sprint Car Tour, a new ten-event pavement sprint tour at Anderson, Lucas Oil Raceway, Berlin Raceway (MI), and other stops. All races use identical specifications and share rules, except for the Little 500 with its formation (eleven rows of three).

=== Winners ===
- 1949 Sam Skinner
- 1950 Tom Cherry
- 1951 Red Renner
- 1952 Tom Cherry
- 1953 Bob King
- 1954 Tom Cherry
- 1955 Tom Cherry
- 1956 Bob Cleberg
- 1957 Johnny White
- 1958 Wayne Alspaugh
- 1959 Ronnie Duman
- 1960 Ronnie Duman
- 1961 Jim McElreath
- 1962 Arnie Knepper
- 1963 Johnny White/Bob Coulter
- 1964 Dick Good
- 1965 Bob King/Chuck Taylor
- 1966 Rollie Beale
- 1967 Darl Harrison/Cy Fairchild
- 1968 Karl Busson
- 1969 Buzz Gregory
- 1970 Darl Harrison
- 1971 Herman Wise
- 1972 Jeff Bloom
- 1973 Dick Gaines
- 1974 Larry Dickson
- 1975 Darl Harrison
- 1976 Dick Gaines
- 1977 Jeff Bloom
- 1978 Don Mack/Curt Kelley
- 1979 Wayne Reutimann/Danny Smith
- 1980 Bob Frey
- 1981 Greg Leffler
- 1982 Marvin Carman
- 1983 Marvin Carman
- 1984 Frank Riddle
- 1985 Frank Riddle
- 1986 Dave Scarborough
- 1987 Bob Frey
- 1988 Bob Frey
- 1989 Bob Frey
- 1990 Bob Frey
- 1991 Jeff Bloom
- 1992 Jim Childers
- 1993 Eric Gordon
- 1994 Jim Childers
- 1995 Bentley Warren
- 1996 Dave Steele
- 1997 Bentley Warren
- 1998 Eric Gordon
- 1999 Chet Fillip
- 2000 Jim Childers
- 2001 Eric Gordon
- 2002 Eric Gordon
- 2003 Eric Gordon
- 2004 Eric Gordon
- 2005 Eric Gordon
- 2006 Brian Tyler
- 2007 Eric Gordon
- 2008 Shane Cottle
- 2009 Dave Steele
- 2010 Eric Gordon
- 2011 Chris Windom
- 2012 Brian Tyler
- 2013 Jacob Wilson
- 2014 Jacob Wilson
- 2015 Chris Windom
- 2016 Kody Swanson
- 2017 Kyle Hamilton
- 2018 Kody Swanson
- 2019 Kody Swanson
- 2020 Bobby Santos III
- 2021 Tyler Roahrig
- 2022 Tyler Roahrig
- 2023 Jake Trainor
- 2024 Caleb Armstrong
- 2025 Jake Trainer
- 2026 Kody Swanson
