= Toledo Speedway =

Motorsport track in the United States

- Location: Toledo, Ohio, United States
- Coordinates: 41°43′0″N 83°30′41″W
- Capacity: 8,000
- Owner: NASCAR (2019–present); ARCA (1960–1978, 1999–2018); Thomas "Sonny" Adams Sr (1979–1998)
- Opened: 1960
- Construction cost: $250,000
- Major events: Current: ARCA Menards Series; Owens Corning 200 (1984–1987, 1989–1994, 1996–present); USAC Silver Crown Series; Rollie Beale Classic; ASA STARS National Tour; Glass City 200 (2000–2003, 2023–present); ARCA Menards Series East (2020, 2026)

Paved Oval (1964–present)
- Surface: Asphalt
- Length: 0.500 mi (0.804 km)
- Banking: 12–13° (Turns 1/2), 11° (Turns 3-4)
- Race lap record: 0:15.860 (Justin Lofton, Dodge Charger, 2008, ARCA)

Toledo Speedway is a half-mile paved oval racetrack located in Toledo, Ohio, United States. It is owned by the Automobile Racing Club of America (ARCA) President Ron Drager, and is the sister track to Flat Rock Speedway in Flat Rock, Michigan.

== History ==
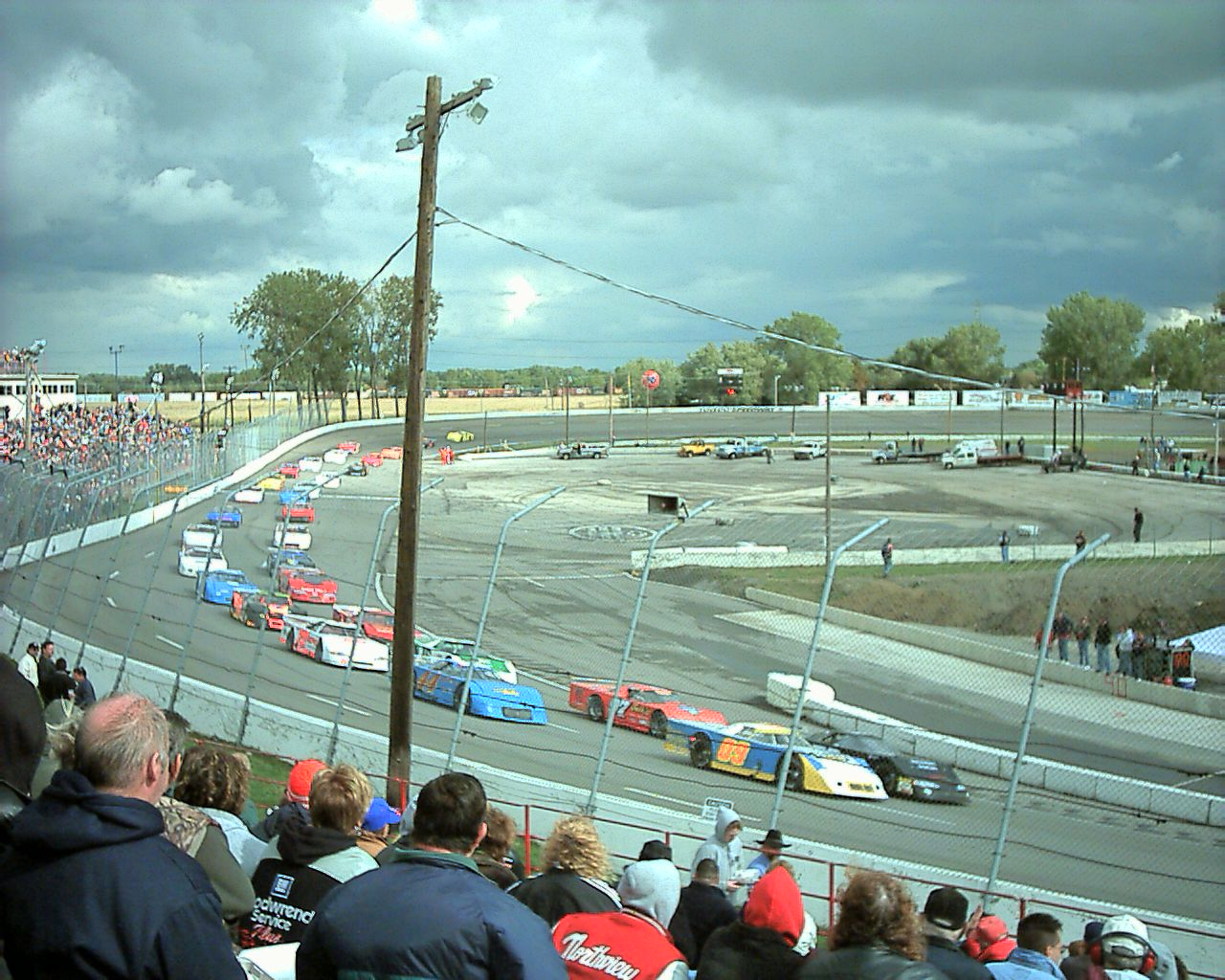
Outlaw late models heading into turn 1 at Toledo Speedway in 2003

Toledo Speedway opened in 1960 and was paved in 1964. In 1978 it was sold to Thomas "Sonny" Adams Sr. The speedway was reacquired by ARCA under president Ron Drager in 1999. The track also features the weekly racing divisions of sportsman on the half-mile and Figure 8, factory stock, and four cylinders on a quarter-mile track inside the big track. They also have a series of races with outlaw-bodied late models that includes four 100-lap races and ends with Glass City 200. The track hosts the "Fastest short track show in the world" which features winged sprints and winged Super Modifieds on the half mile. Toledo also used to host a 200-lap late model race until its sale to ARCA in 1999.

Toledo is known for the foam blocks that line the race track, different than the concrete walls that line many short tracks throughout America. The crumbling walls can make track cleanup a difficult task for workers.

Although NASCAR purchased ARCA in 2018, Drager retained ownership of the speedway.

Toledo was one of the oldest tracks to still host an ARCA Menards Series race until 2019. Starting in 2020, the race became part of the rebranded ARCA Menards Series East (former NASCAR K&N Pro Series East). However, due to COVID-19 pandemic-related scheduling changes, the track ended up hosting three ARCA races in 2020, and returned to the national schedule in 2021 before becoming the season finale the following year.

== National events ==
Toledo, as a track owned by ARCA, plays host to an ARCA Menards Series race and an ARCA Menards Series East race. The USAC Silver Crown Series also visits the track. A touring super late model series, the ARCA/CRA Super Series, also holds an event at Toledo.
