= Owosso Speedway =

Raceway

- Location: Middlebury Township, Shiawassee County, at 7204 West M-21 Ovid, Michigan
- Coordinates: 43°00′06″N 84°18′28″W
- Owner: Rex Wheeler (2022–present)
- Operator: Fast Track Promotions
- Opened: 1939
- Former names: Rocket Motor Speedway, M-21 Speedway
- Major events: Current: ASA STARS National Tour (2024–present); ASA/CRA Super Series (2024–present)
- Website: OwossoSpeedway.com

Speedway (1939–present)
- Surface: Asphalt
- Length: 0.375 mi (0.604 km)
- Turns: 4

Owosso Speedway is a 0.375 mi (0.604 km), progressively banked oval short track located east of Ovid, Michigan, between Ovid and Owosso, further east.

== Track history ==
In 1939 the Owosso Speedway opened as a 1/4 mile (0.40 km) dirt oval. The track would operate until 1944 when it closed to serve as a POW Camp for captured German soldiers from World War II. These soldiers were housed on the Speedway facilities and were allowed out into the community to do small jobs for the locals.

- The track resumed racing in 1946 with a brand-new high banked 1/2 mile (0.80 km) asphalt oval sharing a front stretch with the 1/4 mile. In 1953 the 1/4 mile was paved, while the 1/2 mile remained a dirt track. In 1960 the 1/2 mile would go dormant, as it was closed because the track was allegedly too fast to be insured.
- The 1/2 mile would be resurrected in 1963 and the facility would continue on that way until 1972 when the big track was paved to go along with the already paved little track.
- In 1983 the track was converted over to dirt, for the first time since 1952 the two tracks were both dirt. The Speedway would close in 1988–1989 when the Simko family converted the 1/2 and 1/4 mile tracks over to the current 3/8 mile (0.60 km) oval with progressive banking (steeper in higher lanes), similar to what has since happened to South Boston Speedway in Virginia.
- The circuit was sold in 2022 to current owner Rex Wheeler, who repaved the circuit for the 2023 season.

== Notable alumni ==
- Benny Parsons – 1973 NASCAR Winston Cup Series Champion
- Brad Keselowski – 2012 NASCAR Sprint Cup Series Champion
- Erik Jones – 2017 Monster Energy NASCAR Cup Series Rookie of the year

== Current operations ==
The Owosso Speedway currently races Saturday nights from early-May through September. The weekly classes at the facility are the Pro Late Models, Modifieds Sportsmans, Pure Stocks.

The Speedway also features one Winged Sprint Car event a year along with one special event for the Outlaw Super Late Models every year.
