= Five Flags Speedway =

Auto race track in Pensacola, Florida

- Location: 7451 Pine Forest Rd, Pensacola, Florida
- Coordinates: 30°30′14″N 87°18′30″W
- Opened: 1953
- Major events: Current: Snowball Derby (1968–present); ASA STARS National Tour (2023–present); Former: ARCA Menards Series East; Pensacola 150 (2013–2014, 2020–2025); Superstar Racing Experience (2022); ARCA Menards Series (1992–1996, 2019); X-1R Pro Cup Series (2001–2003); ASA National Tour (2002); NASCAR Southeast Series (1991–1997); NASCAR Grand National Series (1953)

Paved Oval (1953–present)
- Length: 0.500 mi (0.805 km)
- Banking: Turns: 15° Straights: 9°
- Race lap record: 0:17.686 ( (United States) Gio Ruggiero, Toyota Camry, 2024, ARCA Menards)

Five Flags Speedway is a half-mile (0.8 km) paved oval racetrack in Pensacola, Florida. It opened in 1953 and is located on Pine Forest Road. It is christened after the nickname of Pensacola—"City of Five Flags."

It runs several local classes during the regular racing season (March–October). These classes include Super Late Models, Pro Late Models, Pro Trucks, Outlaw Stocks, Sportsman, and Pure Stocks. The races are usual held on Friday nights bi-weekly. The track has also hosted many regional touring series.

== History ==
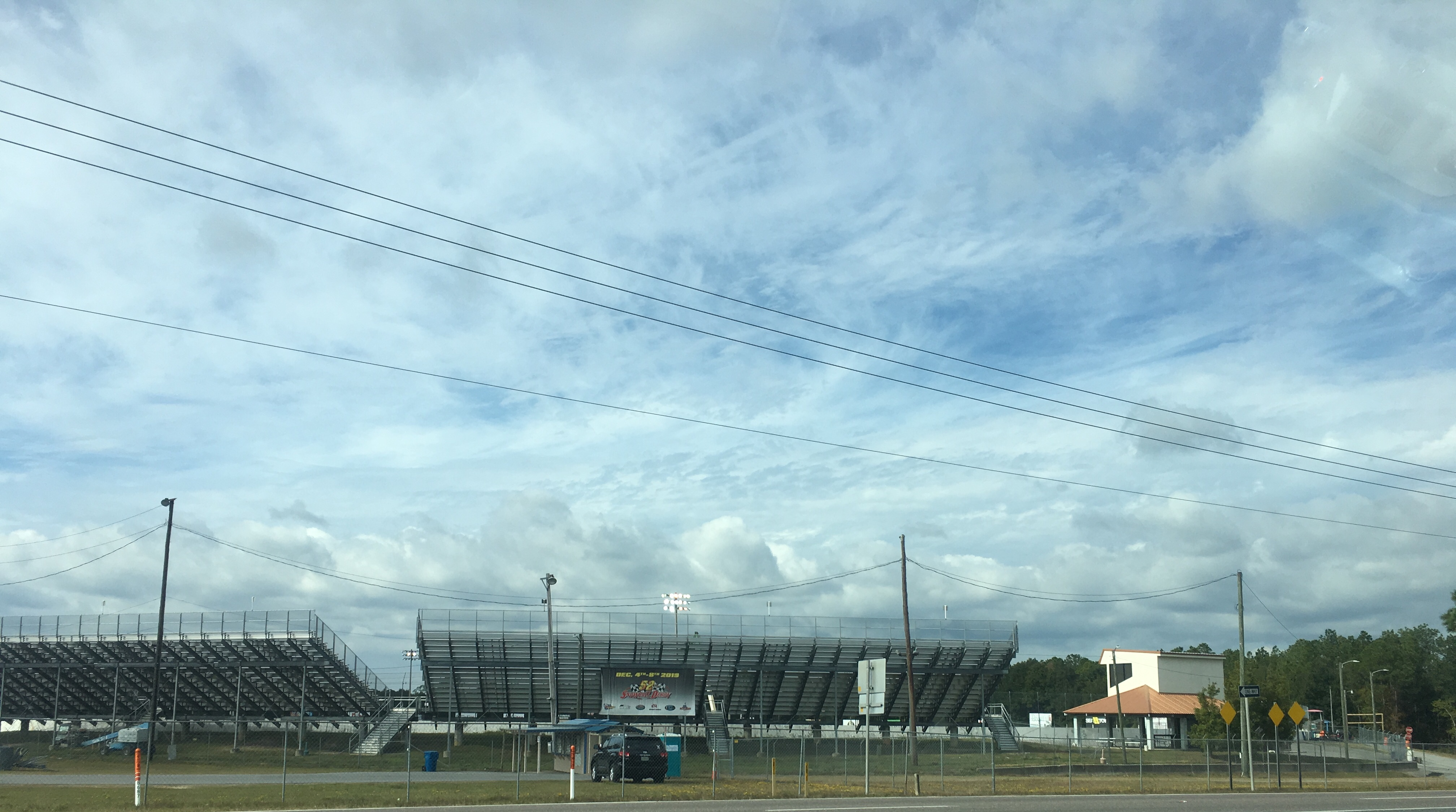
Five Flags Speedway as seen from Pine Forest Road, November 2019

Five Flags hosted a Grand National (now NASCAR Cup Series) race the year that the track opened (1953). The race was won by Herb Thomas driving his Fabulous Hudson Hornet. Other major tours that it has hosted included the NASCAR K&N Pro Series East in 2013 and 2014, NASCAR Southeast Series from 1991 through 1997, the ARCA Racing Series from 1992 to 1996, an ASA National Tour date in 2002, and the CARS X-1R Pro Cup Series from 2001 to 2003.

In 2019, the ARCA Menards Series returned to the track, but for one year only. After the merge between ARCA and NASCAR after the 2019 season, the former NASCAR K&N Pro Series East, (now called ARCA Menards Series East) began racing at Five Flags in 2020.

Gulf Coast Region SCCA runs monthly (based on availability) year around 2-day Autocross events on the inner road of the track, with a variety of layouts based on weather conditions, and an average course time of 35 seconds.

The Superstar Racing Experience visited Five Flags in 2022.

The track's signature event is the Snowball Derby, run every December since 1968. ESPN said that the "Snowball Derby is one of the premier late-model stock-car races in the country, attracting some of the top drivers."

Due to the track lay-out and the highly banked turns, Five Flags is an extremely fast track. The current track record for Super Late Models is 16.120 seconds, set by Ty Majeski in qualifying for the 2015 Snowball Derby.

Five Flags is also well known for having an abrasive surface that quickly wears tires. This characteristic rewards drivers who do not abuse their tires and is considered by many to be part of the appeal of the track.
