= Madison International Speedway =

Stock car racing track in Rutland, Wisconsin

The Track of Champions, Wisconsin's Fastest Half Mile.
- Location: Town of Rutland, Dane County, Wisconsin
- Coordinates: 42°54′21.85″N 89°19′36.3″W
- Capacity: 10,000+
- Owner: Gregg & Angie McKarns (2015–present)
- Opened: 1969
- Former names: Capital Super Speedway; Impact Speedway
- Major events: Current: ASA STARS National Tour (2024–present); ARCA Menards Series; Badger 200 (2011–2014, 2016–2019, 2025–present); Former: X1-R Pro Cup (2005–2007); ASA National Tour (2000–2004); NASCAR Midwest Series (1998–2002)

Outer Oval
- Surface: Asphalt
- Length: 0.500 mi (0.805 km)
- Turns: 4
- Banking: 18°
- Race lap record: 0:18.643 ( (United States) Max Reaves, Toyota Camry, 2025, ARCA Menards)

Inner Oval
- Surface: Asphalt
- Length: 0.250 mi (0.402 km)

Madison International Speedway (MIS) is a half-mile paved oval racetrack in the Town of Rutland near Oregon, Wisconsin, United States. With 18-degree banked turns, the track is billed as "The Track of Champions" and "Wisconsin's Fastest Half Mile." The track hosts weekly program at the track runs on Friday nights under NASCAR Local Racing Series sanction and the ARCA Menards Series' Badger 200.

== History ==
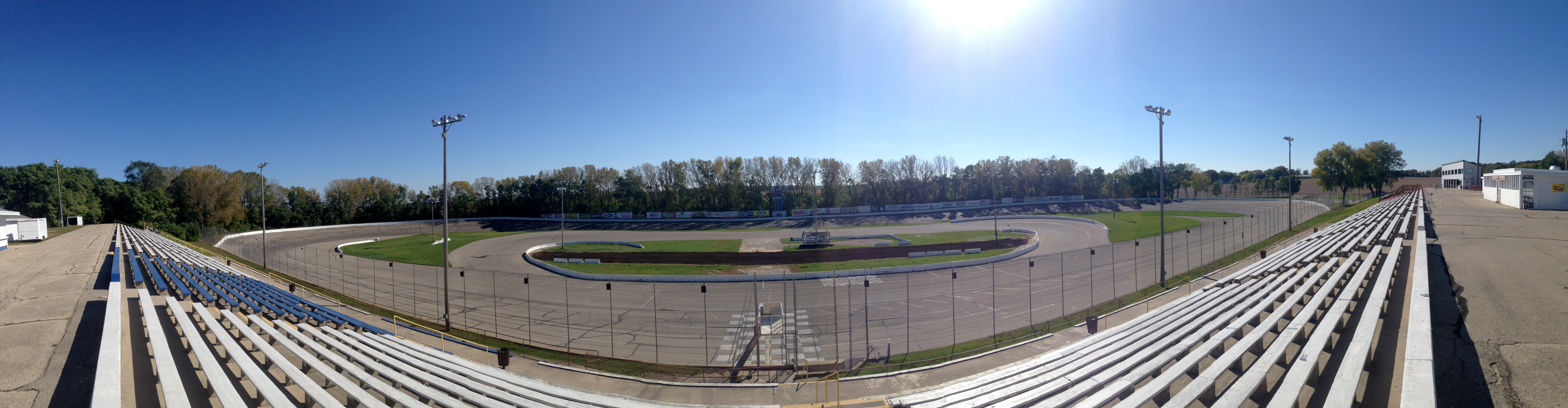
Panoramic view of the track in the fall of 2014.

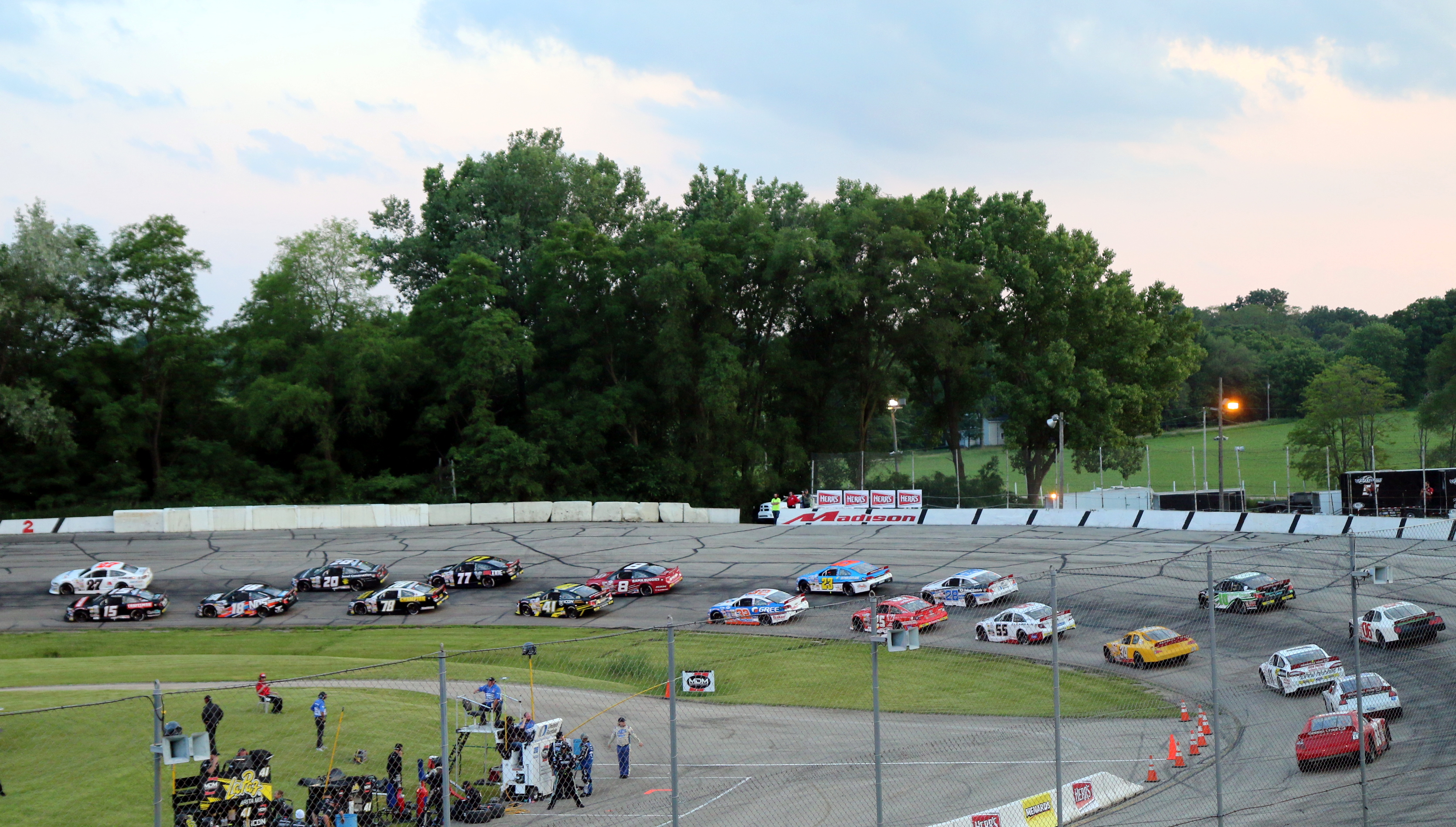
2018 ARCA race field in Turns 1 and 2

The track opened in the 1950s as a dirt quarter-mile run by several organizations as Oregon Legion Speedway. Sam Bartus purchased the track in 1963 and paved the track. In 1969, he tore down the quarter-mile track and built a state of the art high-banked half-mile oval and named it "Capital Super Speedway". Fred Nielsen bought the track in 1980 with John and Sue McKarns running the track in 1980 and 1981. Tony Zidar and his brother Bob purchased the track in 1983 and the added 29 rows of grandstand seating along with a scoreboard on the backstretch. They built a quarter mile track in the infield of the half mile so that sportsman drivers from Jefferson Speedway could race at the track. The track resumed operation as a dirt track under the name of Impact Speedway from 1987 until 1989 under the ownership of Craig Henmen, where the World of Outlaws Sprint Cars made numerous appearances.

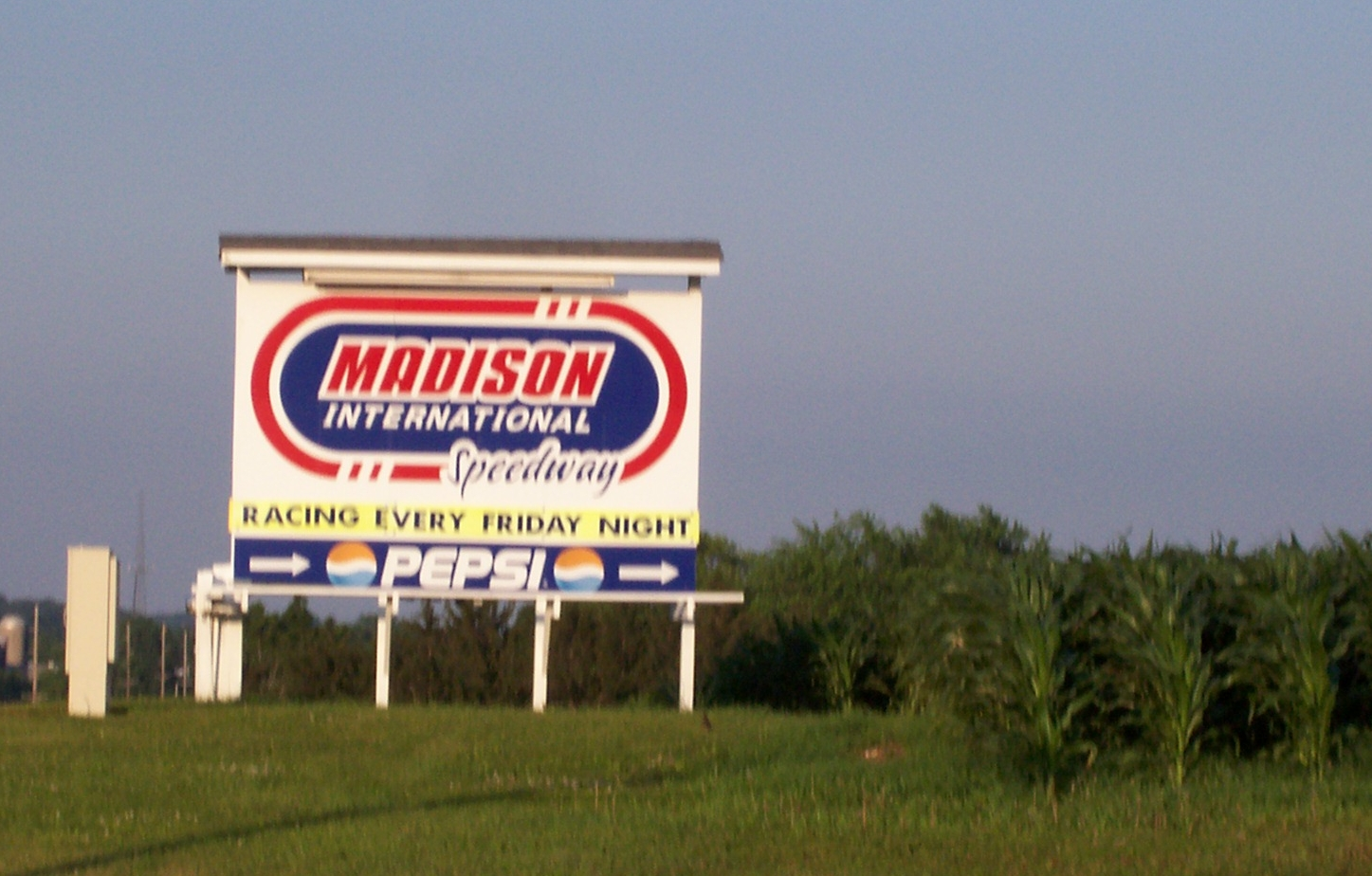
Sign along WIS 138 in 2008

The track was closed down until 1992 when Wayne Erickson, the owner of Slinger Super Speedway, took over. Wayne ran the track until 1996 when Jerry Fillner and his son Kevin Fillner took over. The Fillner family operated the track and made several improvements to the pits and upper concession areas. In 2003, Chicago area businessman Terry Kunes purchased the racetrack and hired Roy Kenseth (Matt Kenseth's father) to be the promoter. After two seasons Roy Kenseth started RK Promotions and decided to leave the track. Steve Einhaus was hired to fill the void left by Kenseth. In 2007, Einhaus would be focusing his attention on the newly formed ASA Midwest Tour (now known as ARCA Midwest Tour) Super Late Model Series. Track promotions were turned over to longtime competitor and official Dave Grueneberg. During his tenure, the track had weekly Friday night races in most seasons but in 2013 it was occasional Sunday afternoon races. In 2015, new ARCA Midwest Tour owner Gregg McKarns purchased the speedway from Kunes. He decided to run weekly Late Models races following the Big 8 Series rules with a monthly Super Late Model event. MIS was later announced as a weekly NASCAR Whelen All-American Series track starting in 2015. It was the third NASCAR weekly track in Wisconsin after Cedar Lake Speedway and La Crosse Fairgrounds Speedway. The late models were designated NASCAR Division I, Sportsman as Division II, and Bandits as Division III. Starting in 2015, the 6Shooter division had its inception. The division consists of six cylinder American made cars which are model years 2002 and older. The division is "True Entry-Level" providing racing experience at a low cost. Points are not awarded and pay is minimal, it's just for fun!

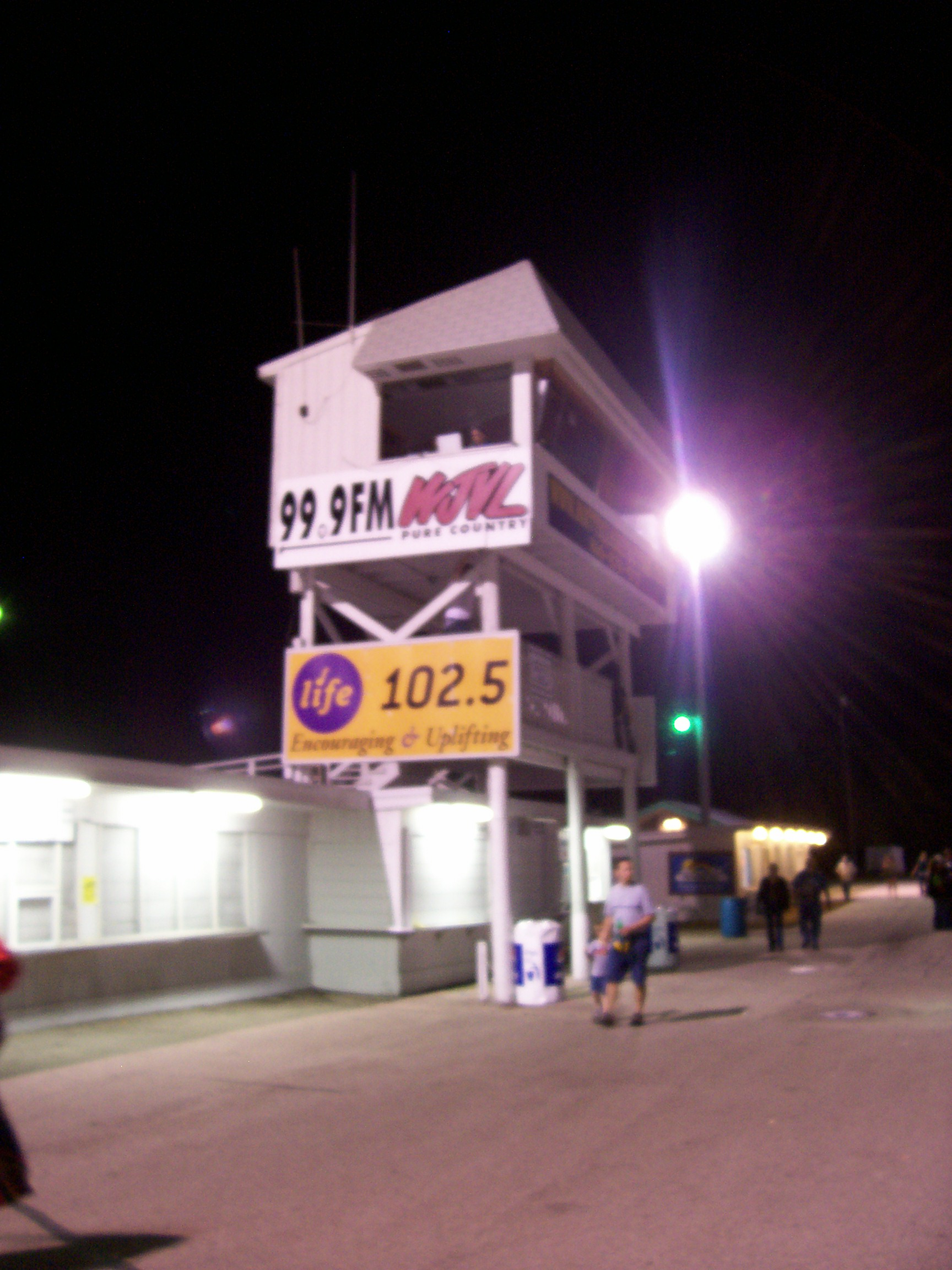
The Scoring tower pictured in 2008

== Track ==
The track was a quarter mile long before it was torn up and replaced with a half mile paved oval in 1969. The first winner on the half mile was Ramo Stott, and the surface's first champion was Jimmy Back. The track seats over 10,000 spectators. There is a quarter mile track inside the half mile. A track veteran described racing the track by saying that you drive into the corners way over your head before you stand on the brakes. The more that you frighten yourself in the corners, the faster that the laps ended up.

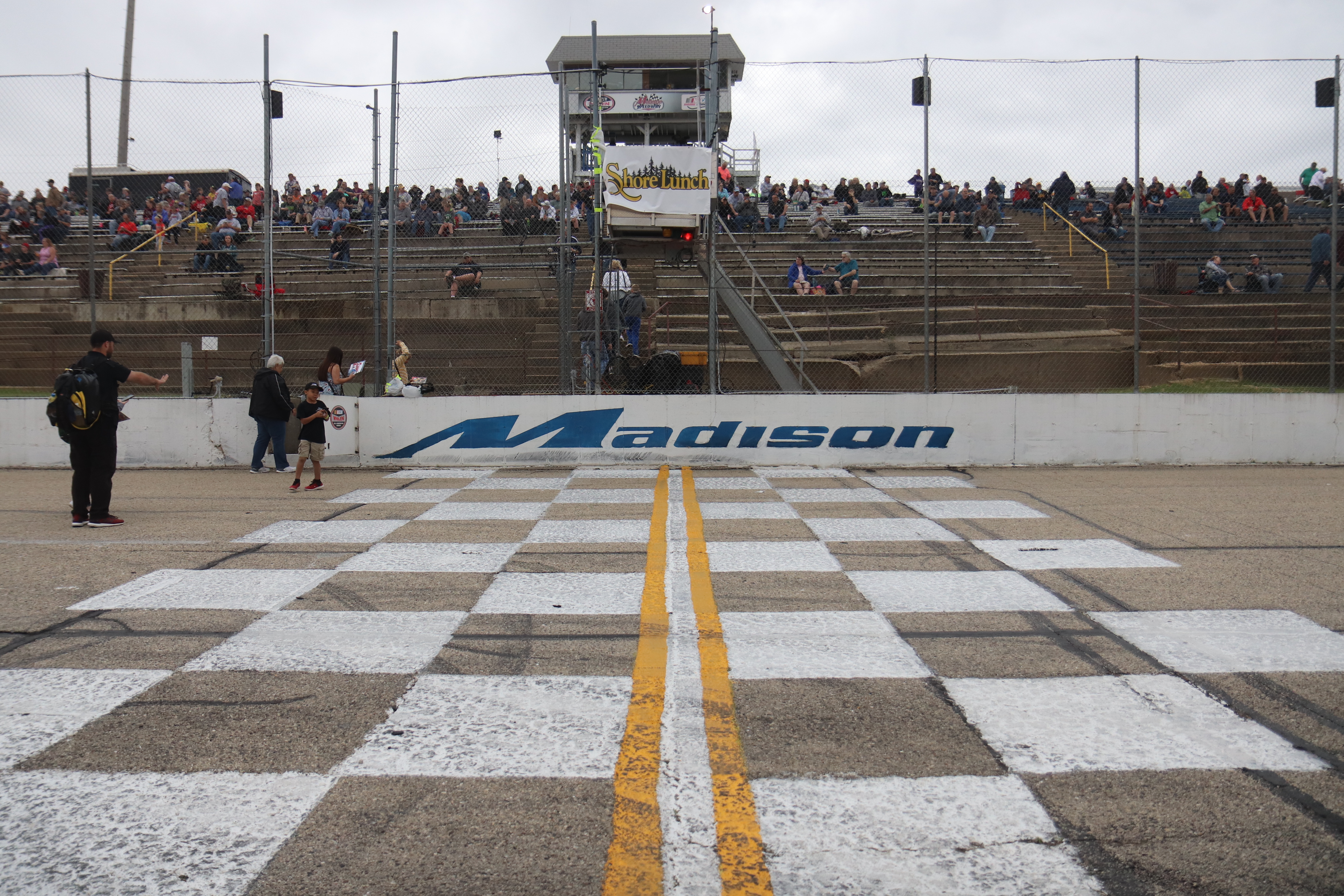
Start-Finish line in 2019

=== Stock car weekly divisions ===
Mike Storkson's 2006 Hobby Stock Track Champion car

As of 2010, MIS featured five weekly divisions. Three race weekly on the half mile outer track: Late models, Area Sportsman, and Hobby Stock. There is a quarter mile track inside the half mile. Weekly division on the inner quarter mile include Legends and Bandits (4 cylinders). Other divisions that race on selected nights include Super Late Models, Super Trucks, Super Stocks, Ford Focus, Midgets, and Bandoleros. The track held Super Late Model races as its premiere class until 2008; the limited late model class became the premiere class in 2009 when it began being called late models.

=== Stock car special events and touring series ===
The track holds events in the ASA Midwest Tour and ASA Late Model Series Northern Division. In 2011, the track held its first ARCA Racing Series race since 1973. The track regularly held American Speed Association events before the national touring series ended. The United States Super Trucks, Mid-American Stock Car Series, the HOSS series, the USAC midgets, the ASA National Tour, the NASCAR Midwest Series and the USAR Hooters Pro Cup Series have appeared in the past.

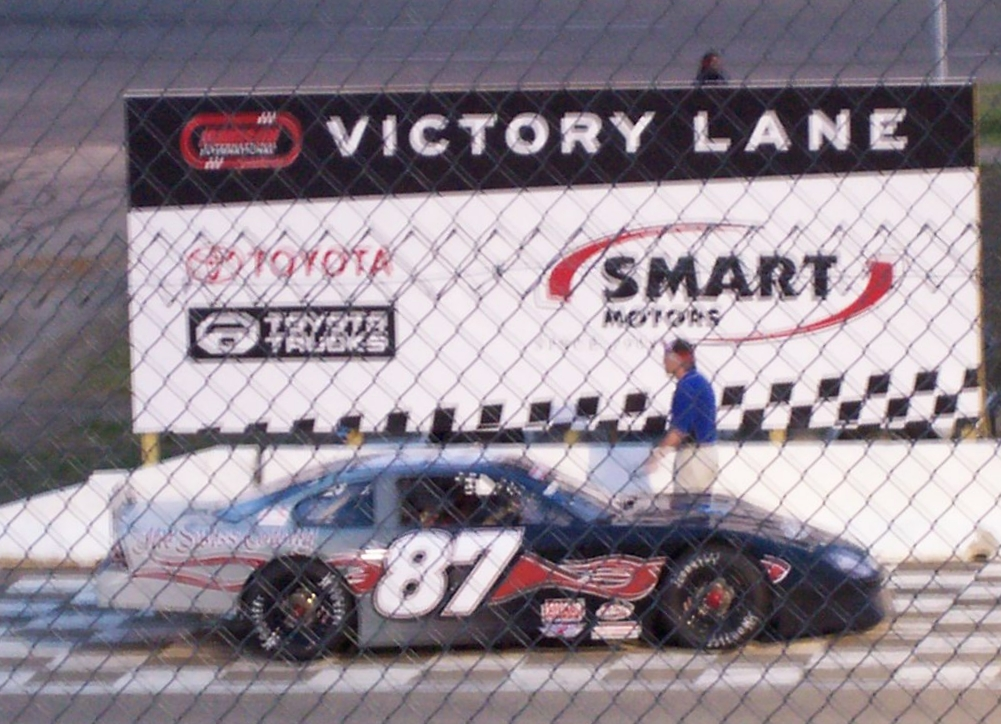
Nathan Haseleu's Late model in Victory Lane in 2007
