= 2016 NASCAR Sprint All-Star Race =

32nd iteration of the NASCAR All-Star Race

Race details
- Date: May 21, 2016
- Location: Charlotte Motor Speedway in Concord, North Carolina
- Course: Permanent racing facility 1.5 mi (2.4 km)
- Distance: Showdown: 50 laps, 75 mi (121 km); All-Star Race: 113 laps, 169.5 mi (272.8 km)
- Avg Speed: Showdown: 82.924 mph (133.453 km/h); All-Star Race: 98.103 mph (157.881 km/h)
- Weather: Temperatures up to 78.1 °F (25.6 °C) with wind speeds up to 13.81 miles per hour (22.23 km/h)

Sprint Showdown
- Pole: Chase Elliott (Hendrick Motorsports)
- Time: Time trials were canceled because of inclement weather.
- Winner (segment 1): Trevor Bayne (Roush Fenway Racing)
- Winner (segment 2): Greg Biffle (Roush Fenway Racing)
- Winner (segment 3): Kyle Larson (Chip Ganassi Racing)
- Fan Vote winners: Chase Elliott (Hendrick Motorsports); Danica Patrick (Stewart–Haas Racing)

Sprint All-Star Race
- Pole: Kevin Harvick (Stewart–Haas Racing)
- Time: Time trials were canceled because of inclement weather.
- Most laps led: Brad Keselowski (Team Penske)
- Laps led: 38
- Winner: Joey Logano (Team Penske)

Television
- Network: Fox Sports 1
- Announcers: Mike Joy, Jeff Gordon and Darrell Waltrip
- Nielsen ratings: 1.7 (Overnight); 2.0 (Final); 3.3 million viewers

Radio
- Network: Motor Racing Network
- Announcers: Joe Moore, Jeff Striegle and Rusty Wallace (Booth); Dave Moody (1 & 2); Kyle Rickey (3 & 4) (Turns)

The 2016 NASCAR Sprint All-Star Race (XXXII) was a NASCAR Sprint Cup Series stock car exhibition race held on May 21, 2016 at Charlotte Motor Speedway in Concord, North Carolina. Contested over 113 laps, it was the second exhibition race of the 2016 Sprint Cup Series season.

This marks the first all-star race without Jeff Gordon since 1993.

== Report ==
=== Background ===
Charlotte Motor Speedway, the track where the race was held.

The All-Star Race was open to race winners from last season through the 2016 AAA 400 Drive for Autism at Dover International Speedway and all previous All-Star race winners and Sprint Cup champions who had attempted to qualify for every race in 2016 were eligible to compete in the All-Star Race.

==== Entry list ====
===== Sprint Showdown =====
The entry list for the Sprint Showdown was released on Monday, May 16 at 12:29 p.m. Eastern time. Twenty-five drivers were entered for the race.

No.	Driver	Team	Manufacturer
3	Austin Dillon	Richard Childress Racing	Chevrolet
6	Trevor Bayne	Roush Fenway Racing	Ford
7	Regan Smith	Tommy Baldwin Racing	Chevrolet
10	Danica Patrick	Stewart–Haas Racing	Chevrolet
13	Casey Mears	Germain Racing	Chevrolet
15	Clint Bowyer	HScott Motorsports	Chevrolet
16	Greg Biffle	Roush Fenway Racing	Ford
17	Ricky Stenhouse Jr.	Roush Fenway Racing	Ford
21	Ryan Blaney (R)	Wood Brothers Racing	Ford
23	David Ragan	BK Racing	Toyota
24	Chase Elliott (R)	Hendrick Motorsports	Chevrolet
27	Paul Menard	Richard Childress Racing	Chevrolet
30	Josh Wise	The Motorsports Group	Chevrolet
32	Jeffrey Earnhardt (R)	Go FAS Racing	Ford
34	Chris Buescher (R)	Front Row Motorsports	Ford
38	Landon Cassill	Front Row Motorsports	Ford
42	Kyle Larson	Chip Ganassi Racing	Chevrolet
43	Aric Almirola	Richard Petty Motorsports	Ford
44	Brian Scott (R)	Richard Petty Motorsports	Ford
46	Michael Annett	HScott Motorsports	Chevrolet
47	A. J. Allmendinger	JTG Daugherty Racing	Chevrolet
55	Reed Sorenson	Premium Motorsports	Chevrolet
83	Matt DiBenedetto	BK Racing	Toyota
95	Michael McDowell	Circle Sport – Leavine Family Racing	Chevrolet
98	Cole Whitt	Premium Motorsports	Chevrolet
Official initial Sprint Showdown entry list

Key	Meaning
(R)	Rookie

===== Sprint All-Star Race =====
The entry list for the All-Star Race was released that same day at 11:34 a.m. Fifteen cars were automatically entered for the race. Five other cars transferred from the Sprint Showdown to determine the final grid for the Sprint All-Star Race. Kyle Busch's car was renumbered to No. 75 to celebrate the said anniversary of sponsor Mars Corporation's M&M's brand candy.

No.	Driver	Team	Manufacturer
1	Jamie McMurray	Chip Ganassi Racing	Chevrolet
2	Brad Keselowski	Team Penske	Ford
4	Kevin Harvick	Stewart–Haas Racing	Chevrolet
5	Kasey Kahne	Hendrick Motorsports	Chevrolet
11	Denny Hamlin	Joe Gibbs Racing	Toyota
14	Tony Stewart	Stewart–Haas Racing	Chevrolet
19	Carl Edwards	Joe Gibbs Racing	Toyota
20	Matt Kenseth	Joe Gibbs Racing	Toyota
22	Joey Logano	Team Penske	Ford
31	Ryan Newman	Richard Childress Racing	Chevrolet
41	Kurt Busch	Stewart–Haas Racing	Chevrolet
48	Jimmie Johnson	Hendrick Motorsports	Chevrolet
75	Kyle Busch	Joe Gibbs Racing	Toyota
78	Martin Truex Jr.	Furniture Row Racing	Toyota
88	Dale Earnhardt Jr.	Hendrick Motorsports	Chevrolet
Official Sprint All-Star Race entry list

== Practice ==
=== Sprint Showdown practice ===
Sprint Showdown practice was originally scheduled to be held on Friday, May 20. However, the practice session was canceled because of wet track conditions caused by constant rain showers.

=== All-Star Race practice ===
Pos	No.	Driver	Team	Manufacturer	Time	Speed
1	2	Brad Keselowski	Team Penske	Ford	28.121	192.027
2	19	Carl Edwards	Joe Gibbs Racing	Toyota	28.121	192.027
3	11	Denny Hamlin	Joe Gibbs Racing	Toyota	28.139	191.904
Sprint All-Star Final practice results

== Sprint Showdown ==
=== Segment One ===
Chase Elliott led the field to the green flag at 11:32 a.m. The first caution of the race flew on lap 16 for a single-car spin on the frontstretch. Exiting turn 4, Michael McDowell got loose and spun through the grass.

The race restarted on lap 20. Coming to the line, Trevor Bayne edged out Elliott to win the first segment. Brian Scott was tagged for a lug nut violation and Cole Whitt was tagged for his crew being over the wall too soon. Both restarted the race from the tail-end of the field.

=== Segment Two ===
The race restarted on lap 21. Austin Dillon passed Elliott going into turn 1 to take the lead on lap 22. Greg Biffle passed Dillon going into turn 3 to take the lead with 24 laps to go and drove onto win the segment.

=== Segment Three ===
The race restarted with 10 laps to go. Kyle Larson battled Elliott to the line to win the segment. Elliott was voted into the All-Star Race by fan vote. Because of a quick caused by an eligible driver not being entered, second place in fan vote Danica Patrick was also voted into the All-Star Race.

=== Sprint Showdown results ===
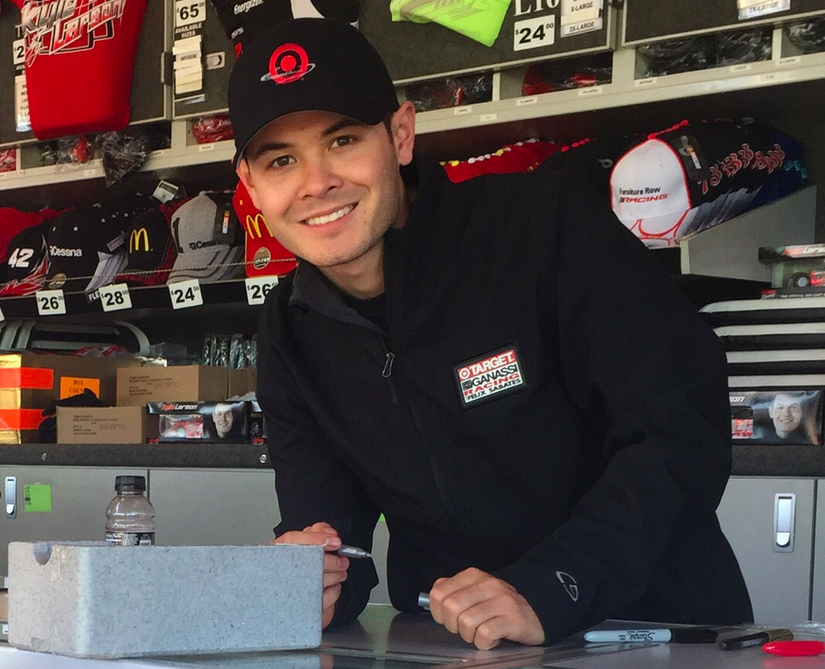
Kyle Larson was the winner of the third and final segment in the Sprint Showdown.

Pos	Grid	No.	Driver	Team	Manufacturer	Laps
1	7	42	Kyle Larson	Chip Ganassi Racing	Chevrolet	50
1	10	16	Greg Biffle	Roush Fenway Racing	Ford	40^{a}
1	5	6	Trevor Bayne	Roush Fenway Racing	Ford	20^{b}
2	1	24	Chase Elliott (R)	Hendrick Motorsports	Chevrolet	50
3	3	21	Ryan Blaney (R)	Wood Brothers Racing	Ford	50
4	11	43	Aric Almirola	Richard Petty Motorsports	Ford	50
5	4	47	A. J. Allmendinger	JTG Daugherty Racing	Chevrolet	50
6	13	38	Landon Cassill	Front Row Motorsports	Ford	50
7	12	15	Clint Bowyer	HScott Motorsports	Chevrolet	50
8	14	13	Casey Mears	Germain Racing	Chevrolet	50
9	9	10	Danica Patrick	Stewart–Haas Racing	Chevrolet	50
10	6	17	Ricky Stenhouse Jr.	Roush Fenway Racing	Ford	50
11	15	44	Brian Scott (R)	Richard Petty Motorsports	Ford	50
12	2	3	Austin Dillon	Richard Childress Racing	Chevrolet	50
13	8	27	Paul Menard	Richard Childress Racing	Chevrolet	50
14	17	23	David Ragan	BK Racing	Toyota	50
15	18	83	Matt DiBenedetto	BK Racing	Toyota	50
16	16	95	Michael McDowell	Circle Sport – Leavine Family Racing	Chevrolet	50
17	20	34	Chris Buescher (R)	Front Row Motorsports	Ford	50
18	21	46	Michael Annett	HScott Motorsports	Chevrolet	50
19	19	7	Regan Smith	Tommy Baldwin Racing	Chevrolet	50
20	25	30	Josh Wise	The Motorsports Group	Chevrolet	50
21	22	98	Cole Whitt	Premium Motorsports	Chevrolet	50
22	23	32	Jeffrey Earnhardt (R)	Go FAS Racing	Ford	50
23	24	55	Reed Sorenson	Premium Motorsports	Chevrolet	49
^a Winner of the second segment.^b Winner of the first segment.
Sprint Showdown race results

== All-Star Race starting lineup ==
Pos	No.	Driver	Team	Manufacturer
1	4	Kevin Harvick	Stewart–Haas Racing	Chevrolet
2	75	Kyle Busch	Joe Gibbs Racing	Toyota
3	41	Kurt Busch	Stewart–Haas Racing	Chevrolet
4	19	Carl Edwards	Joe Gibbs Racing	Toyota
5	48	Jimmie Johnson	Hendrick Motorsports	Chevrolet
6	2	Brad Keselowski	Team Penske	Ford
7	24	Chase Elliott (R)	Hendrick Motorsports	Chevrolet
8	22	Joey Logano	Team Penske	Ford
9	78	Martin Truex Jr.	Furniture Row Racing	Toyota
10	88	Dale Earnhardt Jr.	Hendrick Motorsports	Chevrolet
11	20	Matt Kenseth	Joe Gibbs Racing	Toyota
12	11	Denny Hamlin	Joe Gibbs Racing	Toyota
13	1	Jamie McMurray	Chip Ganassi Racing	Chevrolet
14	31	Ryan Newman	Richard Childress Racing	Chevrolet
15	6	Trevor Bayne	Roush Fenway Racing	Ford
16	5	Kasey Kahne	Hendrick Motorsports	Chevrolet
17	14	Tony Stewart	Stewart–Haas Racing	Chevrolet
18	42	Kyle Larson	Chip Ganassi Racing	Chevrolet
19	10	Danica Patrick	Stewart–Haas Racing	Chevrolet
20	16	Greg Biffle	Roush Fenway Racing	Ford
Sprint All-Star Race starting lineup

== All-Star Race ==
=== Segment 1 ===
Under North Carolina night skies, Kevin Harvick led the field to the green flag at 10:11 p.m. Kyle Busch led the first lap, but he and Harvick raced side-by-side for the lead for a number of laps before Harvick took it on lap 6. Harvick made his mandatory stop of the race on lap 27 and surrendered the lead to Busch. Logano passed Busch to take the lead on lap 34. He pitted with five laps to go in the first segment as Jamie McMurray spinning brought out the first caution of the race. Matt Kenseth hadn't pitted under green as the rules require, so he was held a lap under caution as the segment ended. Brad Keselowski exited pit road with the race lead.

=== Segment 2 ===
The race restarted on lap 51. Weepers in turn 2 brought out the second caution of the race on lap 57.

The race restarted on lap 62 and a multi-car wreck on the frontstretch brought out the third caution of the race. Exiting turn 4, Kenseth got turned up the track, collected Tony Stewart and slammed the wall. Stewart's car turned down the track and collected Kasey Kahne. Stewart said afterwards that he was "as baffled as anybody. I don’t know how we were scored a lap down after they stopped the 20 car, and they pit everyone together. Lap down and lead lap and lap down. It’s the most screwed up All-Star race I’ve ever been a part of. I’m glad this is the last one.” He would go on to finish last.

The race restarted on lap 72.

=== 13 laps to go ===
The race restarted with 13 laps to go. Logano dove underneath Kyle Larson going into turn 1 and Larson ended up in the wall with three laps to go. Larson said afterwards that he "was able to clear them and I thought I would pull away pretty easily because I was really good on short runs. Joey and their team must have done a really good job at making the right adjustments. We made the car a little bit better, but I guess we really didn't take a big enough swing to tighten up." Logano drove on to score the victory.

=== Post-race ===
==== Driver comments ====
Logano said after the race that his race was "awesome. I thought it went great. What a great car. It says a lot about our race team to unload today with a completely new package, have 10 minutes of practice and unload and say, ‘The car is pretty good. I don’t have much to say. We really made only one change on our car. That was about the only amount of time we had in practice was to make one change. It was the same for everybody, but, overall, I felt like our car was competitive.”

=== All-Star Race results ===
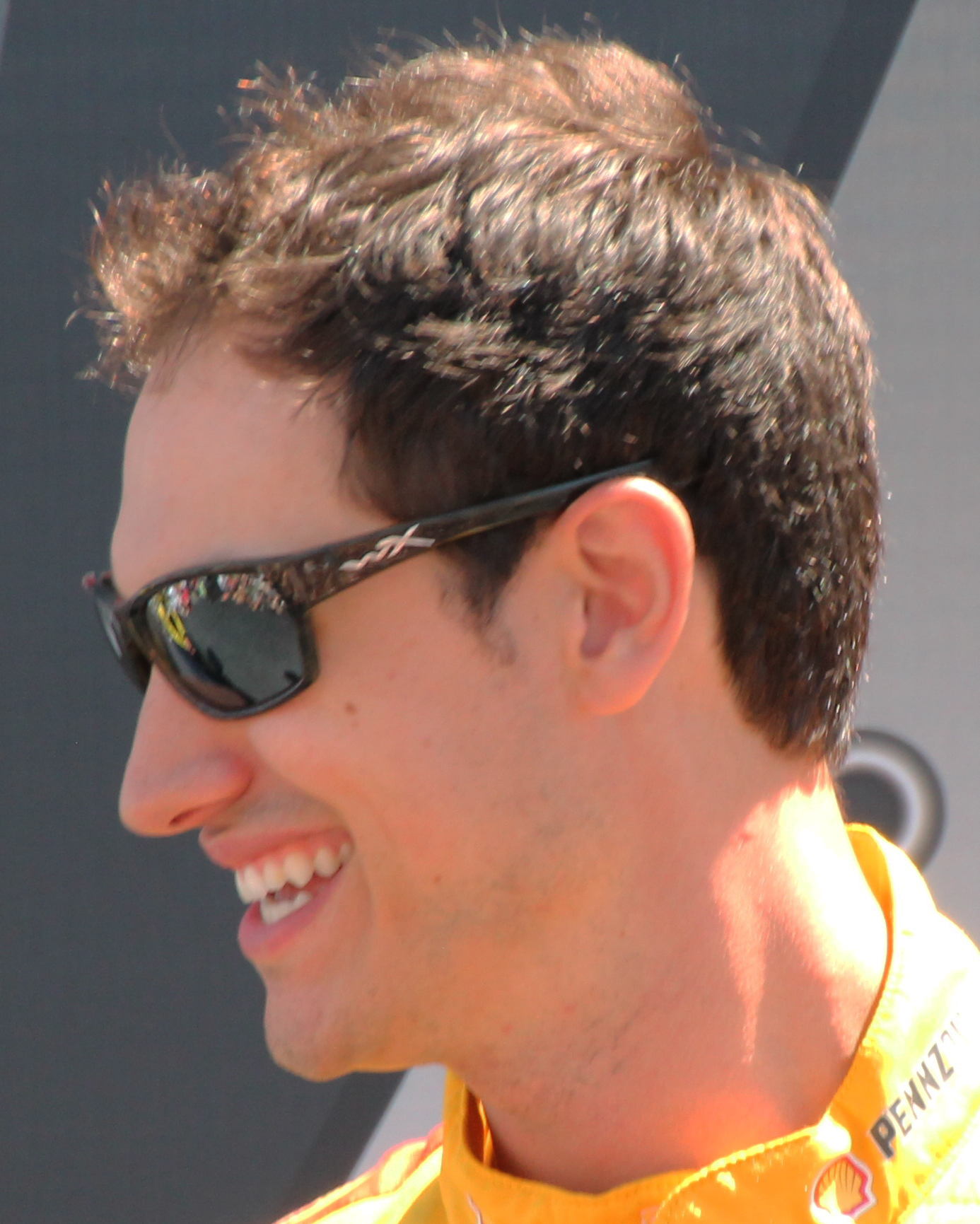
Joey Logano took the victory during the final segment.

Pos	Grid	No.	Driver	Team	Manufacturer	Laps
1	8	22	Joey Logano	Team Penske	Ford	113
2	6	2	Brad Keselowski	Team Penske	Ford	113
3	10	88	Dale Earnhardt Jr.	Hendrick Motorsports	Chevrolet	113
4	4	19	Carl Edwards	Joe Gibbs Racing	Toyota	113
5	3	41	Kurt Busch	Stewart–Haas Racing	Chevrolet	113
6	7	24	Chase Elliott	Hendrick Motorsports	Chevrolet	113
7	15	6	Trevor Bayne	Roush Fenway Racing	Ford	113
8	20	16	Greg Biffle	Roush Fenway Racing	Ford	113
9	12	11	Denny Hamlin	Joe Gibbs Racing	Toyota	113
10	2	75	Kyle Busch	Joe Gibbs Racing	Toyota	113
11	1	4	Kevin Harvick	Stewart–Haas Racing	Chevrolet	113
12	5	48	Jimmie Johnson	Hendrick Motorsports	Chevrolet	113
13	14	31	Ryan Newman	Richard Childress Racing	Chevrolet	113
14	9	78	Martin Truex Jr.	Furniture Row Racing	Toyota	113
15	19	10	Danica Patrick	Stewart–Haas Racing	Chevrolet	113
16	18	42	Kyle Larson	Chip Ganassi Racing	Chevrolet	111
17	13	1	Jamie McMurray	Chip Ganassi Racing	Chevrolet	110
18	11	20	Matt Kenseth	Joe Gibbs Racing	Toyota	71
19	16	5	Kasey Kahne	Hendrick Motorsports	Chevrolet	71
20	17	14	Tony Stewart	Stewart–Haas Racing	Chevrolet	70
All-Star Race results

== Media ==
=== Television ===
Fox Sports was the television broadcaster of the race in the United States. Lap-by-lap announcer, Mike Joy, was accompanied on the broadcast by retired NASCAR drivers, Jeff Gordon and Darrell Waltrip. Jamie Little, Vince Welch, and Matt Yocum reported from pit lane.

Fox Sports 1 Television
Booth announcers	Pit reporters
Lap-by-lap: Mike Joy; Color-commentator: Jeff Gordon; Color commentator: Darrell Waltrip	Jamie Little; Vince Welch; Matt Yocum

=== Radio ===
Motor Racing Network (MRN) continued their longstanding relationship with the track to broadcast the race on radio. The lead announcers for the race's broadcast were Joe Moore, Jeff Striegle and Rusty Wallace. The network also implemented two announcers on each side of the track: Dave Moody in turns 1 and 2 and Kyle Rickey in turns 3 and 4. Alex Hayden, Winston Kelly and Steve Post were the network's pit lane reporters. The network's broadcast was also simulcasted on Sirius XM NASCAR Radio.

MRN Radio
Booth announcers	Turn announcers	Pit reporters
Lead announcer: Joe Moore; Announcer: Jeff Striegle; Announcer: Rusty Wallace	Turns 1 & 2: Dave Moody; Turns 3 & 4: Kyle Rickey	Alex Hayden; Winston Kelly; Steve Post

Previous race: 2016 AAA 400 Drive for Autism	Sprint Cup Series; 2016 season	Next race: 2016 Coca-Cola 600
