= Chase Elliott =

American racing driver (born 1995)

- Elliott at Las Vegas Motor Speedway in 2026
- Born: William Clyde Elliott II; November 28, 1995 (age 30); Dawsonville, Georgia, U.S.
- Height: 6 ft 1 in (1.85 m)
- Achievements: 2020 NASCAR Cup Series Champion; 2022 NASCAR Cup Series Regular Season Champion; 2014 Nationwide Series Champion; 2020 NASCAR All-Star Race Winner; 2025 Cook Out Clash Winner; 3× The Duel at Daytona Winner (2017, 2018, 2026); 2× Daytona 500 Pole Winner (2016, 2017); 2× Snowball Derby Winner (2011, 2015); 3× Snowflake 100 Winner (2010, 2012, 2013); 2010 Winchester 400 Winner; 2012 World Crown 300 Winner; 2013 All American 400 Winner; Youngest Cup road course winner (22 years); Youngest Dover International Speedway Cup race winner (22 years, 10 months, 8 days); Youngest Kansas Speedway Cup race winner (22 years); Youngest Darlington Raceway Xfinity race winner (18 years)
- Awards: 2014 NASCAR Nationwide Series Rookie of the Year; 2014–2015 NASCAR Xfinity Series Most Popular Driver; 2016 NASCAR Sprint Cup Series Rookie of the Year; 2018–2025 NASCAR Cup Series Most Popular Driver (8 times); Named one of NASCAR's 75 Greatest Drivers

NASCAR Cup Series career
- 394 races run over 12 years
- Car no., team: No. 9 (Hendrick Motorsports)
- 2026 position: 12th
- Best finish: 1st (2020)
- First race: 2015 STP 500 (Martinsville)
- Last race: 2026 Season Finale 400 (Homestead)
- First win: 2018 Go Bowling at The Glen (Watkins Glen)
- Last win: 2026 Würth 400 (Texas)
| Wins | Top tens | Poles |
|---|---|---|
| 23 | 203 | 12 |

NASCAR O'Reilly Auto Parts Series career
- 89 races run over 10 years
- 2026 position: 73rd
- Best finish: 1st (2014)
- First race: 2014 DRIVE4COPD 300 (Daytona)
- Last race: 2026 Pennzoil 250 (Indianapolis)
- First win: 2014 O'Reilly Auto Parts 300 (Texas)
- Last win: 2024 BetMGM 300 (Charlotte)
| Wins | Top tens | Poles |
|---|---|---|
| 6 | 73 | 3 |

NASCAR FedEx Freight Truck Series career
- 19 races run over 8 years
- 2026 position: 108th
- Best finish: 22nd (2013)
- First race: 2013 Kroger 250 (Martinsville)
- Last race: 2026 FaithFest 250 (North Wilkesboro)
- First win: 2013 Chevrolet Silverado 250 (Mosport)
- Last win: 2020 North Carolina Education Lottery 200 (Charlotte)
| Wins | Top tens | Poles |
|---|---|---|
| 3 | 16 | 3 |

ARCA Menards Series career
- 12 races run over 3 years
- Best finish: 25th (2012)
- First race: 2012 Mobile ARCA 200 (Mobile)
- Last race: 2014 Lucas Oil 200 (Daytona)
- First win: 2013 Pocono ARCA 200 (Pocono)
| Wins | Top tens | Poles |
|---|---|---|
| 1 | 11 | 1 |

ARCA Menards Series East career
- 26 races run over 2 years
- Best finish: 4th (2012)
- First race: 2011 Kevin Whitaker Chevrolet 150 (Greenville-Pickens)
- Last race: 2012 Classic 3 Championship (Rockingham)
- First win: 2012 Graham Tire 150 (Iowa)
| Wins | Top tens | Poles |
|---|---|---|
| 1 | 15 | 1 |

ARCA Menards Series West career
- 4 races run over 3 years
- Best finish: 38th (2012, 2016)
- First race: 2011 Casino Arizona 125 (Phoenix)
- Last race: 2016 Chevy's Fresh Mex 200 (Sonoma)
- First win: 2016 Chevy's Fresh Mex 200 (Sonoma)
| Wins | Top tens | Poles |
|---|---|---|
| 1 | 3 | 1 |

Signature
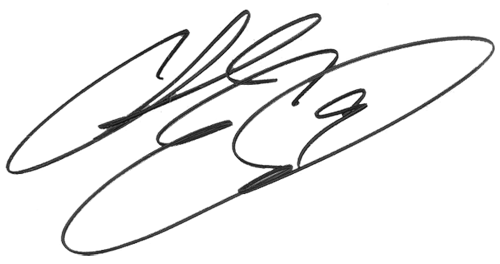
- Statistics up to date as of November 8, 2026.

William Clyde "Chase" Elliott II (born November 28, 1995) is an American professional stock car racing driver. He competes full-time in the NASCAR Cup Series, driving the No. 9 Chevrolet Camaro ZL1 for Hendrick Motorsports.

Chase is the son of 1988 Winston Cup Series champion and 2015 NASCAR Hall of Fame inductee Bill Elliott. The Elliotts are one of many father-son duos in NASCAR history, joining Lee and Richard Petty, Buck and Buddy Baker, Ned and Dale Jarrett, Bobby and Davey Allison, as well as Dale Earnhardt and Dale Earnhardt Jr. (all NASCAR Hall of Fame Inductees). Before Chase's stock car racing career, Elliott had an extremely highly successful career in late model racing, with wins in several prestigious events, including completing the "unofficial grand slam of super late model racing", with wins in the Snowball Derby in 2011 & 2015 (including three prelude wins in the Snowflake 100 in 2010, 2012, & 2013), the Winchester 400 in 2010, the World Crown 300 in 2012, and the All American 400 in 2013.

Elliott began his NASCAR career by winning the 2014 NASCAR Nationwide Series Rookie of the Year and the 2014 NASCAR Nationwide Series championship, becoming the first rookie and the youngest driver to win a national series championship in NASCAR history. Elliott began racing full-time in the NASCAR Cup Series in 2016, taking over the iconic No. 24 Chevrolet for Hendrick Motorsports, previously driven by Jeff Gordon. That same year, he earned the NASCAR Sprint Cup Series Rookie of the Year award.

In 2018, Elliott began driving the No. 9 (in honor of his father) NAPA Auto Parts sponsored Chevrolet, and won his first career Cup Series race at the road course of Watkins Glen. In 2020, he won the NASCAR Cup Series championship, marking Hendrick Motorsports' thirteenth overall Cup Series Championship, their first title since 2016, and Chase joining his father Bill Elliott as the third father-son duo in NASCAR history to win NASCAR Cup Series Championships (joining Lee & Richard Petty, and Ned & Dale Jarrett). Elliott has won exhibition races in the 2020 NASCAR All-Star Race at Bristol, and the 2025 Cook Out Clash at Bowman Gray Stadium, while currently amassing an additional 23 career Cup Series victories, including seven on road courses. He is currently NASCAR's reigning 8x Most Popular Driver Award winner, and in 2023 was named as one of NASCAR's 75 Greatest Drivers.

== Racing career ==
=== Early career and short track racing ===
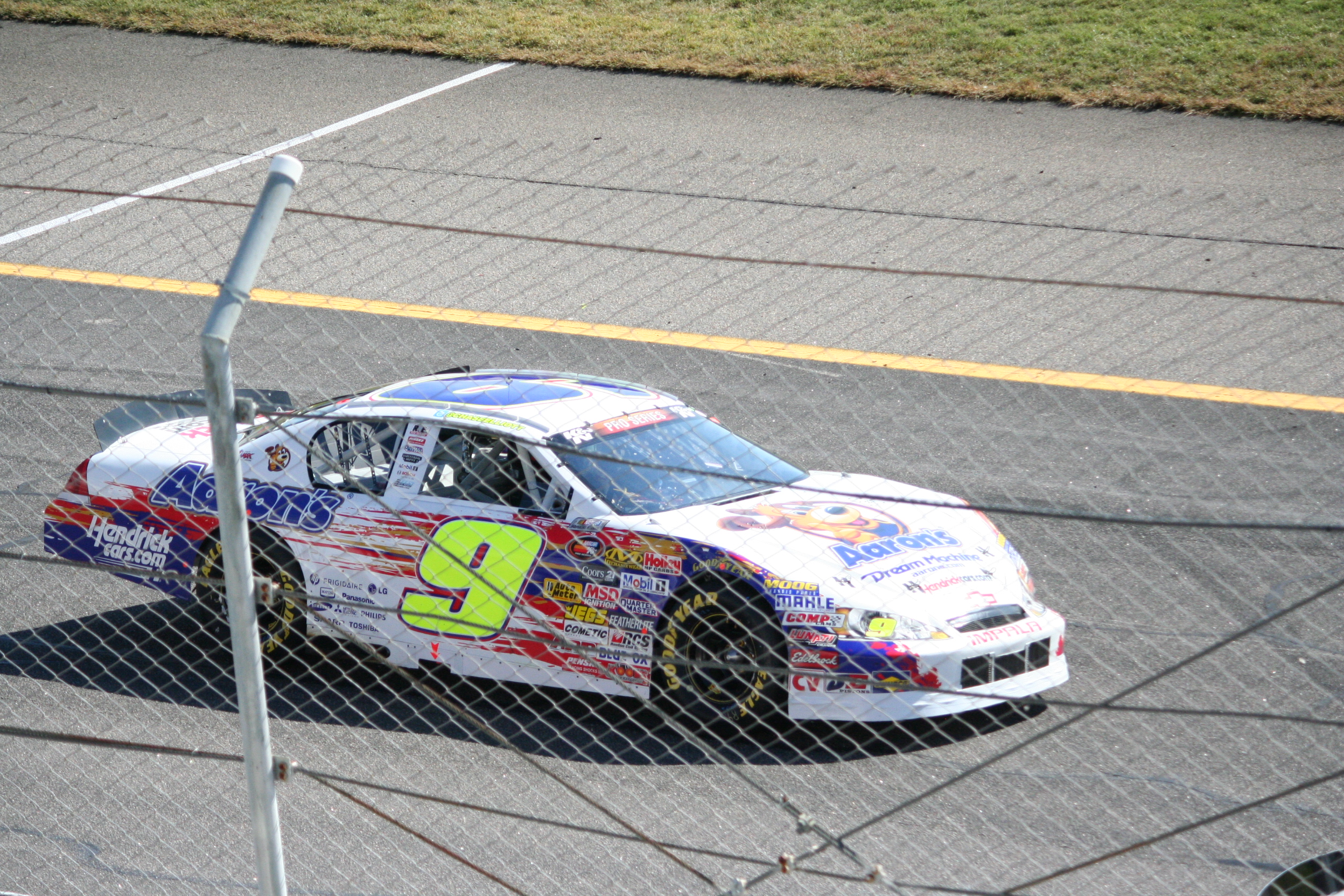
Chase's K&N Pro Series East car at Rockingham in 2012

At the age of thirteen, Elliott was featured in the July 13, 2009, issue of Sports Illustrated alongside 13 other athletes, including future world number one golfer Jordan Spieth and future NBA second overall pick Michael Kidd-Gilchrist, as potential stars. In 2010, Elliott competed in forty races across various series, winning twelve events and finishing in the top-ten 38 times. During his third season of racing, he won the Blizzard Series, Miller Lite, and Gulf Coast championships and was named the Georgia Asphalt Pro Late Model Series Rookie of the Year. He capped off the season by winning the prestigious Winchester 400. Sports Illustrated recognized Elliott as its High School Player of the Week in April 2011. That year, he competed in the Champion Racing Association, claiming the National Super Late Model championship. Shortly after turning 16, Elliott made history as the youngest winner of the Snowball Derby, edging out D.J. Vanderley by a record 0.229 seconds. In 2012, Elliott added to his achievements by winning the Alan Turner Snowflake 100, the Snowball Derby's prelude race, for the second time in three years.

In November 2013, Elliott won the All American 400, becoming the first driver to capture all four of the nation's premier short-track races: the All American 400, the Snowball Derby, the World Crown 300, and the Winchester 400. The following month, Elliott initially appeared to make history by sweeping the Snowball Derby and Snowflake 100 in the same weekend. However, during a post-race inspection, his car was found to contain a prohibited piece of tungsten, resulting in his disqualification and the victory being awarded to Erik Jones. Elliott later claimed the Snowball Derby title in 2015 after the original winner, Christopher Bell, was disqualified.

=== ARCA Menards Series ===
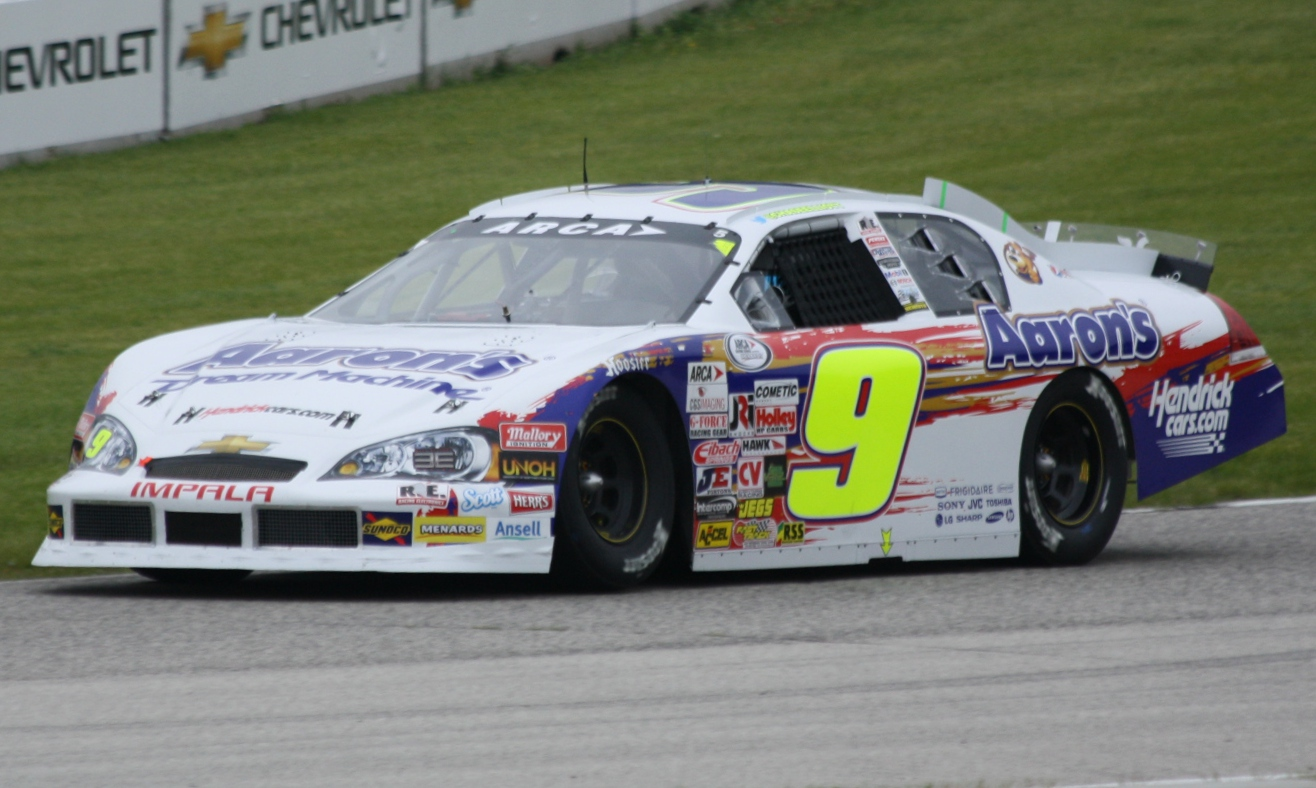
Elliott's 2013 ARCA car at Road America

Elliott competed in six ARCA Racing Series races in 2012 and five in 2013, driving the No. 9 car to gain experience on larger circuits. At the time, ARCA permitted seventeen-year-old drivers to race at Pocono Raceway and Kentucky Speedway, which both have a minimum age of eighteen in NASCAR. For ARCA, the minimum age for ovals longer than 1.25 miles (2,000 meters) is eighteen, while shorter tracks and road courses allow drivers as young as sixteen. On June 8, 2013, Elliott made history at Pocono Raceway by becoming the youngest winner in ARCA superspeedway history.

=== NASCAR ===
==== K&N Pro Series ====
Elliott signed a three-year driver development contract with Hendrick Motorsports in February. In 2012, he competed in the K&N Pro Series East, driving the No. 9 car and finishing ninth in the season standings. Later that year, he returned to the series and secured his first career victory at Iowa Speedway in May, ultimately finishing fourth in the championship standings.

Elliott competed in three NASCAR K&N Pro Series West races at Phoenix Raceway, once in 2011 and twice in 2012. In his 2011 race, he finished third. In 2012, he placed 17th in one race due to a crash and fourth in the other.

==== Craftsman Truck Series ====
In January 2013, it was announced that Elliott would compete in nine NASCAR Craftsman Truck Series races for Hendrick Motorsports during the 2013 season, using trucks prepared by Turner Scott Motorsports. During qualifying for the UNOH 200 at Bristol Motor Speedway, Elliott earned his first career NASCAR pole position with a lap speed of 125.183 mph (201.463 km/h), becoming the youngest pole-sitter in Truck Series history.

Elliott secured his first career win in the Chevrolet Silverado 250 at Canadian Tire Motorsport Park, the first road course race for the Truck Series held outside the United States. At the time, he became the youngest winner in Truck Series history at seventeen years, nine months, and four days. This record stood until September 2014, when Cole Custer won at New Hampshire Motor Speedway at just sixteen years, seven months, and 28 days. Elliott's victory, however, was not without controversy. On the final corner, he made contact with leader Ty Dillon, causing Dillon to hit the tire barrier. Elliott veered into the grass but managed to recover and cross the finish line ahead of Chad Hackenbracht from Kyle Busch Motorsports. After the race, Dillon expressed his frustration, stating that the next time they raced, "he won't finish the race." Elliott later mentioned that he tried to apologize to Dillon but received no response. The following week at Iowa Speedway, Elliott cut down a tire early in the race and crashed, with no involvement from Dillon.

In October 2016, Elliott competed in the Alpha Energy Solutions 200 at Martinsville Speedway, marking his first Truck Series race since 2013. Driving the No. 71 for Contreras Motorsports, which leased owner points and a truck chassis from JR Motorsports, he led a race-high 109 laps and finished second. In 2017, Elliott joined GMS Racing, driving the No. 23 truck in two races at Atlanta and Martinsville, where he secured a win at Martinsville. Three years later, he returned to the series with GMS Racing in the No. 24 truck. This effort was prompted by Kevin Harvick's bounty challenge, offering a reward to full-time Cup Series drivers who could beat Kyle Busch in a Truck Series race. Originally scheduled for Atlanta, Elliott's attempt was postponed to Charlotte in May due to the COVID-19 pandemic. Elliott ultimately won the race, finishing ahead of Busch and claiming the bounty. The victory came amidst lingering tensions between the two drivers following an earlier incident that season.

In 2021, Elliott returned to the Truck Series, racing for GMS Racing at Texas Motor Speedway. In 2022, he drove the No. 7 truck for Spire Motorsports in the Bristol Dirt event. For the 2023 season opener at Daytona International Speedway on February 17, Elliott took the wheel of the No. 35 Chevy Silverado RST for McAnally–Hilgemann Racing, substituting for Jake Garcia, who was underage to compete. The rain-shortened race ended after 79 of the scheduled 100 laps, with Elliott finishing in tenth place.

==== O'Reilly Auto Parts Series ====
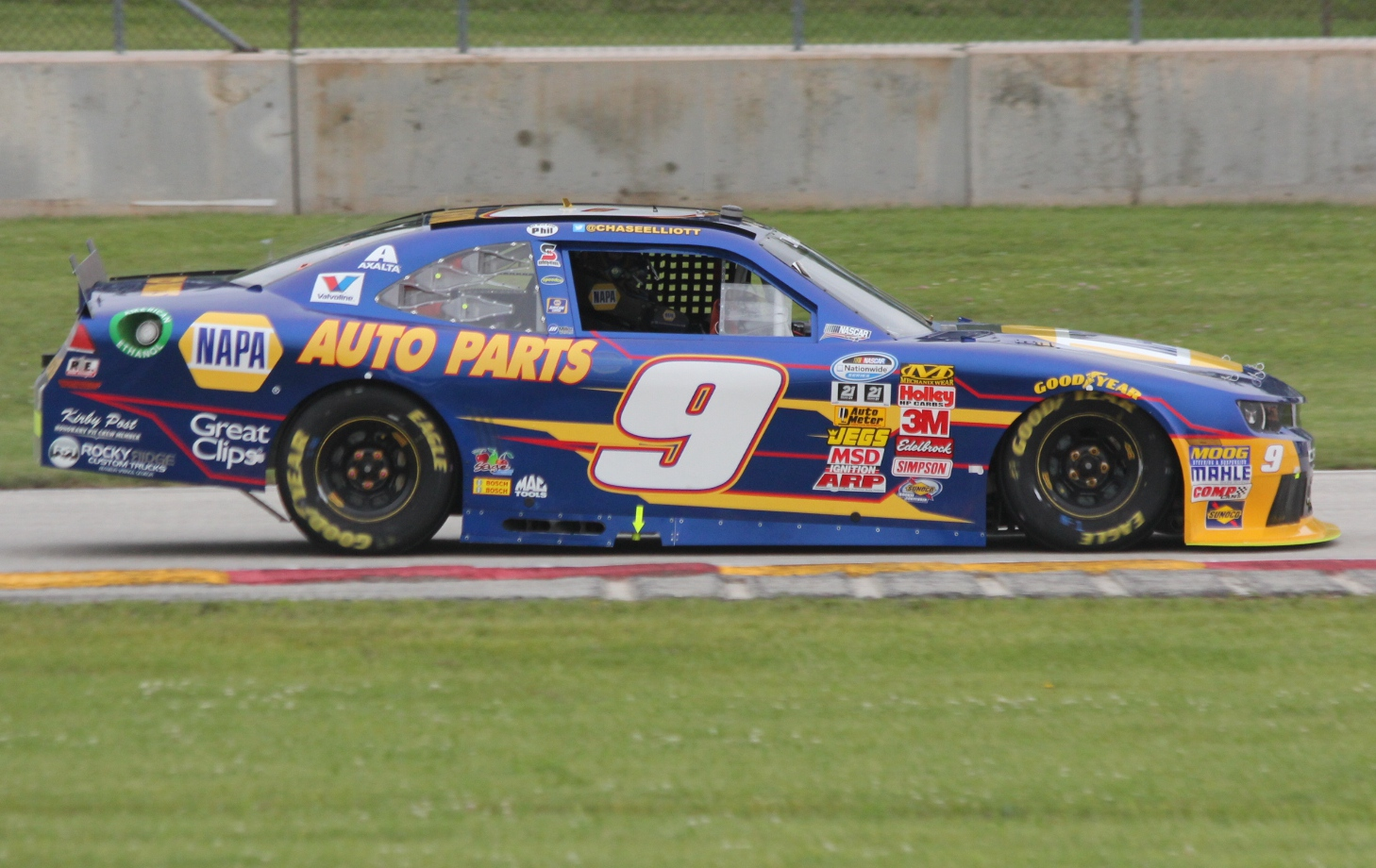
Elliott racing his Nationwide car at Road America in 2014

In January 2014, it was announced that Elliott would compete full-time in the Nationwide Series, driving the No. 9 Chevrolet for JR Motorsports with sponsorship from NAPA Auto Parts. On April 4, 2014, Elliott earned his first series win at the O'Reilly Auto Parts 300 at Texas Motor Speedway, holding off Kevin Harvick and Kyle Busch after taking the lead with sixteen laps remaining. A week later, on April 11, he secured another victory at the VFW Sport Clips Help a Hero 200 at Darlington Raceway by passing Elliott Sadler on the final lap after restarting sixth with just two laps to go. Elliott continued his success with a win at the EnjoyIllinois.com 300 at Chicagoland Speedway, where he held off Trevor Bayne for the victory. At Phoenix, he clinched the Nationwide Series championship with a 53-point lead over teammate Regan Smith, becoming both the first rookie and the youngest driver to win a NASCAR national series title. To cap off an impressive season, Elliott was also named the Nationwide Series Most Popular Driver.

In 2015, Elliott recorded the first DNF of his career after being involved in the second major crash at Daytona, finishing 28th. On September 11, he snapped a 36-race winless streak by securing his first victory of the season at Richmond. Despite battling Chris Buescher for the championship, Elliott ultimately finished second in the standings. After moving up to the Cup Series in 2016, Elliott continued to compete part-time in the Xfinity Series for JR Motorsports. That year, he drove the No. 88 car in five races, including the season-opening PowerShares QQQ 300 at Daytona, which he won. He also piloted the No. 5 car at Texas.

In 2018, he started the season driving the No. 88 car at Daytona, where his teammate Tyler Reddick secured a photo-finish victory over teammate Elliott Sadler. After Spencer Gallagher's suspension from NASCAR, it was announced that he would drive the No. 23 car for GMS Racing in select events, including races at Charlotte, Pocono, Chicagoland, Daytona, and Bristol.

In 2021, Elliott substituted for Michael Annett at the Indianapolis Motor Speedway road course. In 2022, he surprisingly failed to qualify for the Darlington spring event after qualifying was canceled due to rain. In 2024, Elliott drove the Hendrick Motorsports No. 17 to victory lane at Charlotte.

==== Cup Series ====
On January 29, 2015, Hendrick Motorsports announced that Elliott would make his Sprint Cup Series debut that year, driving the No. 25 car with Kenny Francis as his crew chief. Elliott was scheduled to compete in five races: Martinsville, Richmond, Charlotte, Indianapolis, and Darlington. The team also revealed that Elliott would take over Jeff Gordon's iconic No. 24 car starting in 2016.

Elliott's Cup Series debut in the STP 500 faced uncertainty due to potential rain. Without the owner's points or prior race attempts, he would have failed to qualify if qualifying had been canceled. However, Elliott secured a spot by recording a lap speed of 96.919 mph (155.976 km/h), placing 27th on the starting grid. During the race, Elliott made contact with Brett Moffitt on lap 75, causing debris to fall from his car and leaving damage hanging from its rear. Additionally, his power steering was compromised. The incident forced him to drop to 37th and enter the garage. Elliott returned to the track on lap 144, 69 laps behind the leader, and ultimately finished 38th, 73 laps down. On May 5, 2015, it was announced that Elliott would compete in the Sprint All-Star Race's Sprint Showdown. He finished eighth and fifth in the event's two segments.

===== 2016: Rookie season =====
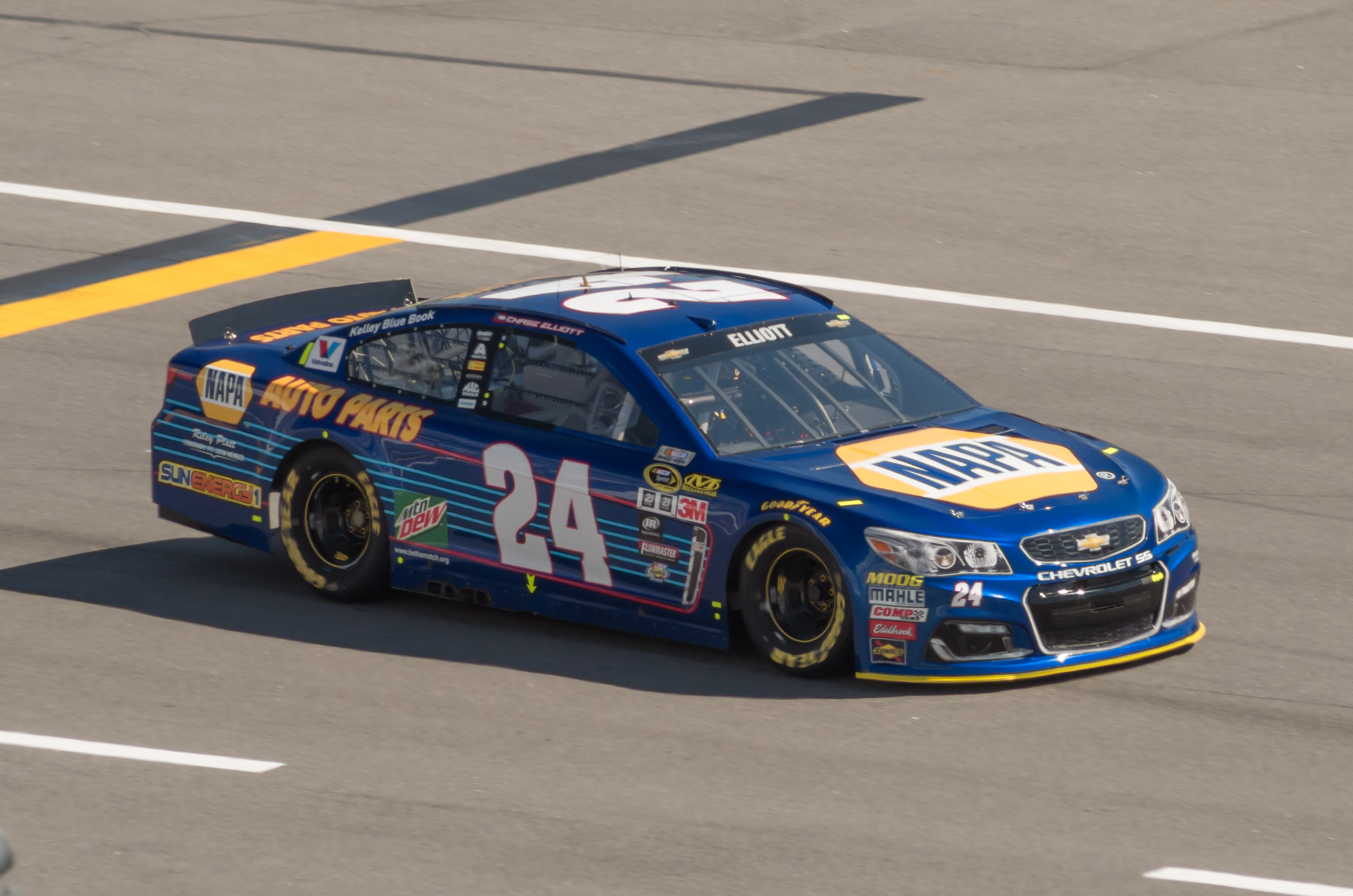
Elliott's No. 24 before the 2016 Daytona 500

Elliott joined the Sprint Cup Series full-time in 2016, driving the No. 24 car with Alan Gustafson as his crew chief. He replaced the retiring Jeff Gordon, a long-time driver of the No. 24. Elliott's primary sponsors included NAPA Auto Parts, 3M, SunEnergy1, Kelley Blue Book, and Mountain Dew. That year, he won the rookie of the Year award, beating competitors Ryan Blaney, Chris Buescher, Jeffrey Earnhardt, and Brian Scott.

In his Daytona 500 debut, Elliott won the pole position with a speed of 196.314 mph (315.937 km/h), becoming the youngest pole-sitter in the race's history at just 20 years old. Elliott led three laps before spinning out on lap 18 while exiting turn four, sliding into the grass and damaging the front of his car. After repairs, he returned to the race on lap 59, forty laps down, and finished 37th. The following week, Elliott earned his first Sprint Cup top-ten finish with an eighth-place result at Atlanta. At Las Vegas, he ran inside the top-five with forty laps to go but ultimately crashed and finished 38th. Despite setbacks, Elliott's rookie season saw consistent improvement. He secured multiple top-ten finishes during the spring, including fifth at Texas (his first top-five finish), fourth at Bristol, fifth at Talladega, ninth at Kansas, third at Dover, eighth in the Coca-Cola 600, and a career-best second at Michigan. At Pocono, during the Axalta "We Paint Winners" 400, Elliott had a breakout performance. Starting thirteenth, he led a race-high 51 laps, marking the first time he led the most laps in a Sprint Cup race. Although he lost the lead on a late restart, he managed a solid fourth-place finish. In June at Michigan, Elliott again finished second after missing a shift while leading. Elliott also advanced to the All-Star Race by winning the fan vote and finished seventh, narrowly missing a win in the Sprint Showdown after losing to Kyle Larson in a photo finish. Fifteen races into his rookie season, Elliott was 6th in the standings—highest among drivers without a victory—with two poles (Daytona 500 and Talladega), six top-five finishes, and eleven top-ten finishes. However, he struggled at Sonoma, starting sixteenth and finishing 21st.

He was one of the first rookies to qualify for the Chase, along with Chris Buescher, since Denny Hamlin in 2006. On September 18, 2016, at the Teenage Mutant Ninja Turtles 400, he came close to securing his first win. However, a late caution erased his three-second lead over Martin Truex Jr., who went on to win the race while Elliott finished 3rd. Although he was eliminated after the Round of 12, he still managed to finish tenth in the final standings.

===== 2017: Sophomore season =====
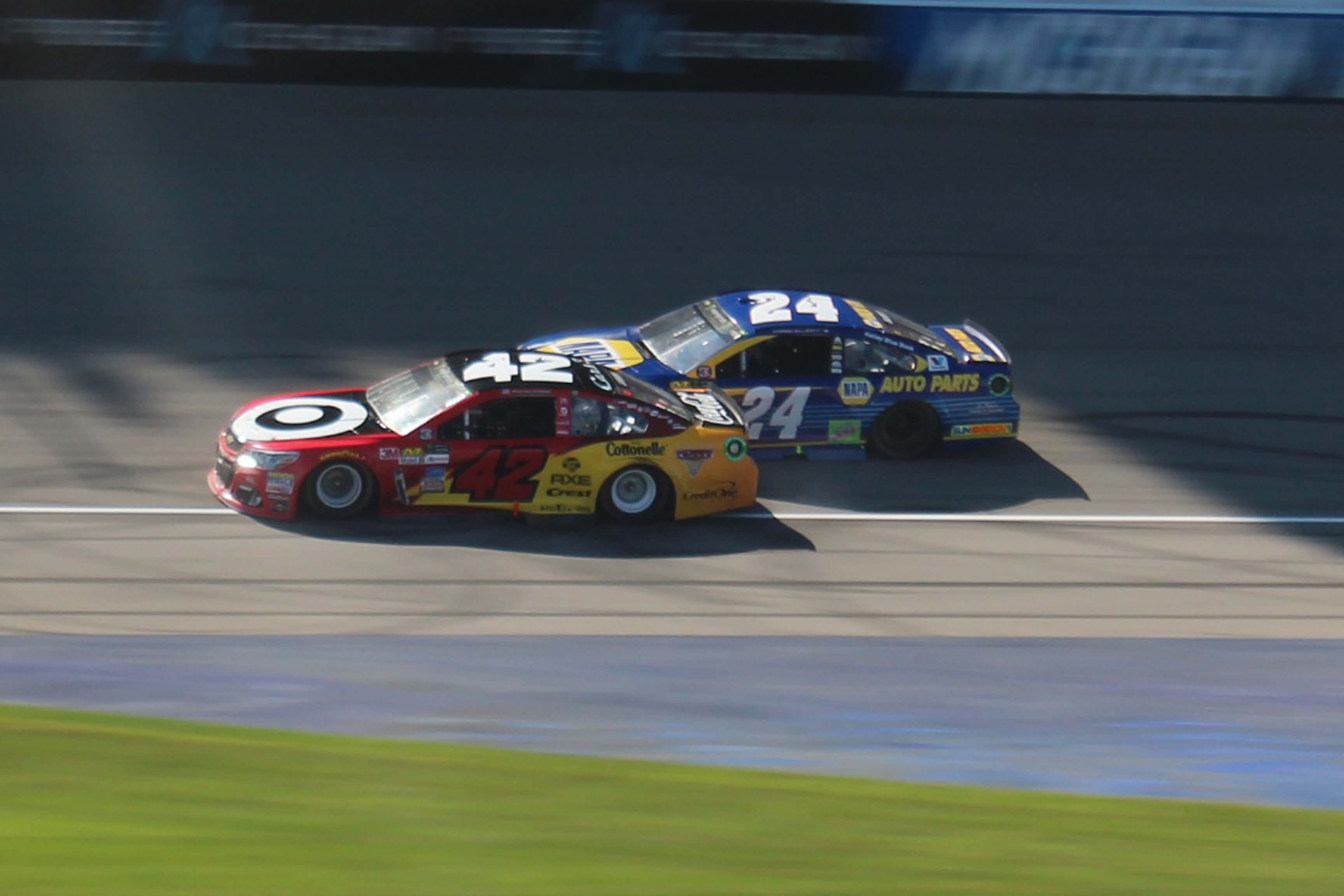
Elliott battling Kyle Larson (No. 42) for the lead at Michigan

Elliott began the 2017 season by winning the pole for the Daytona 500 for the second consecutive year. He followed it up with a victory in the first Can-Am Duel race, becoming the first driver since Dale Earnhardt in 1996—and only the third in NASCAR history (after Davey Allison in 1990)—to win both the Daytona 500 pole and a qualifying race. Later in the season at Martinsville, Elliott capitalized on a bump from Ricky Stenhouse Jr. that moved Kyle Busch's No. 18 car out of the way, allowing Elliott to claim the Stage 2 win. However, his season had its challenges as well. At Talladega on May 7, Elliott was involved in a massive 16-car pileup that nearly caused his car to flip as it briefly went airborne. In June at Michigan, Elliott finished second for the third consecutive time at the track.

On October 1, 2017, Elliott came close to securing his first career win at Dover. Leading 138 laps and holding a 4-second lead over Kyle Busch with 50 laps to go, Elliott encountered lap traffic and was slowed down behind Ryan Newman, known for being one of the hardest drivers to pass. This allowed Busch to overtake Elliott with just two laps remaining, leaving Elliott to finish second. After the race, Jeff Gordon, Elliott's mentor and the former driver of the No. 24 car, confronted Newman for impeding Elliott and costing him his first victory. Later that season, during the fall race at Martinsville, Elliott took the lead from Brad Keselowski with four laps to go, only to have his chances of winning dashed when Denny Hamlin hit him from behind, spinning him out with three laps remaining. Frustrated, Elliott retaliated by driving Hamlin into the outside wall during the cool-down lap. Speaking to NBCSN afterward, Elliott said, "My mom always said if you don't have anything nice to say don't say anything at all, He's not even worth my time. … We had a good opportunity. I can't control his decisions and whatever the hell that was. On to Texas." Hamlin later apologized to Elliott via Twitter.

At Phoenix, Elliott faced a must-win scenario to advance to Miami. Despite leading 34 laps, his championship hopes were dashed when Matt Kenseth passed him with ten laps remaining, leaving Elliott to finish second in the race. Ultimately, he concluded the season ranked fifth in the final standings.

===== 2018: First Cup wins =====
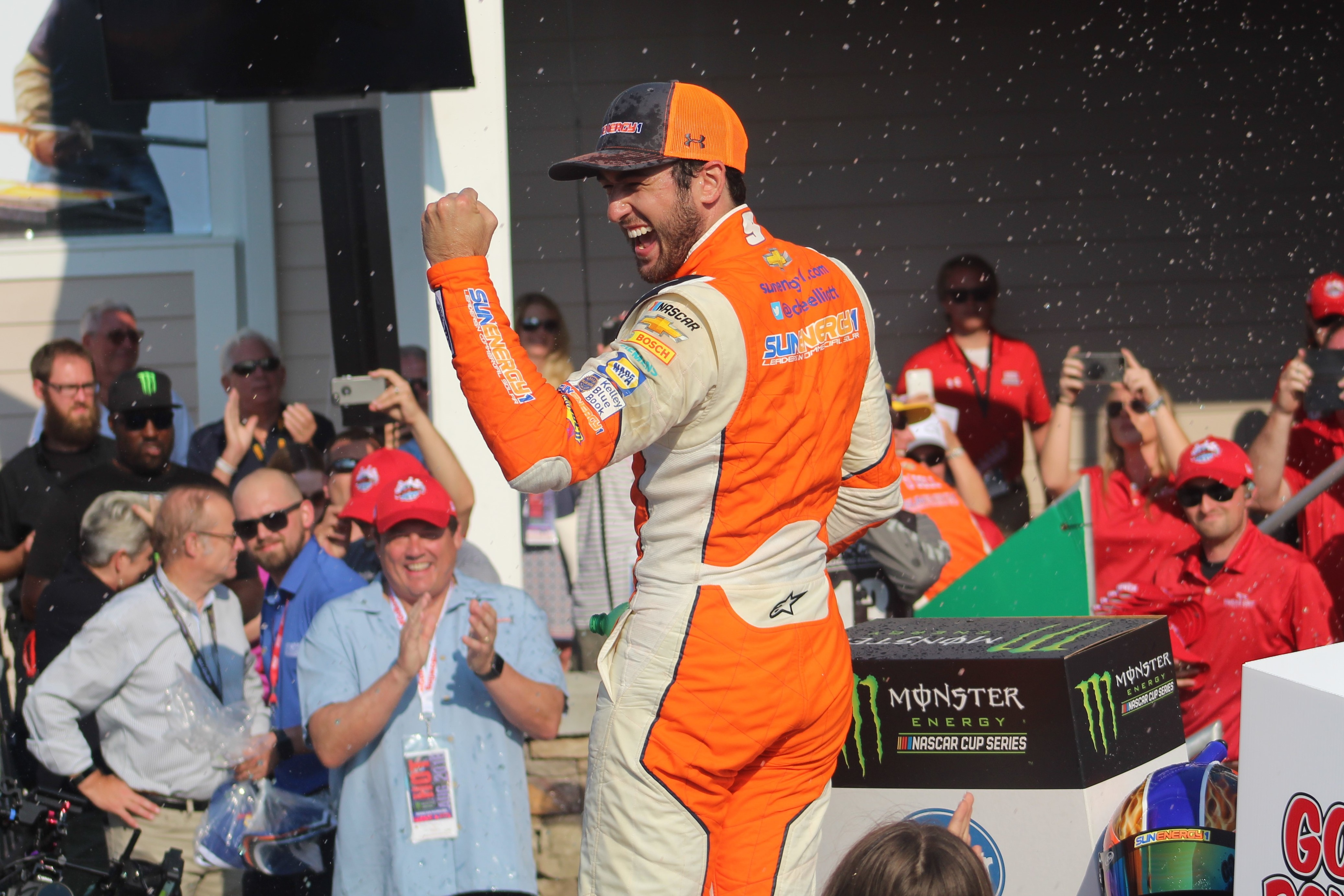
Elliott celebrating after winning the 2018 Go Bowling at The Glen

In 2018, Hendrick Motorsports changed Elliott's car number from No. 24 to No. 9, honoring the number his father, Bill Elliott, drove for most of his racing career. It was also the number Chase used in NASCAR's lower series. Elliott retained his crew, including crew chief Alan Gustafson. During qualifying for the Daytona 500, Elliott posted the ninth-fastest time, ending his streak of two consecutive Daytona 500 poles. In the Advance Auto Parts Clash, he led seventeen of the 75 laps and ran up front for much of the race, but fell back after an incident on the backstretch and was involved in a wreck on the final lap. Despite this, Elliott bounced back to win the second Can-Am Duel, earning a spot in the second row for the Daytona 500. In the Daytona 500, Elliott ran near the front during the first half of the race and even led four laps. However, his day ended early after being caught in an accident on lap 102, resulting in a 33rd-place finish.

In April at Richmond, Elliott secured his best finish of the season so far, placing second in the Toyota Owners 400. This marked the eighth runner-up finish of his career, matching the number of second-place finishes his father had before earning his first win. The following week at Talladega, Elliott started at the rear of the field due to an unapproved tire change but rallied to finish third in the GEICO 500. At Dover, he started sixth and ran well, finishing in the top-ten in both stages before slipping to twelfth by the end. He followed this with another twelfth-place finish at Kansas and rebounded from a 22nd-place qualifying position to finish eleventh in the Coca-Cola 600. Elliott described the Pocono 400 as his team's "best race of the year" up to that point, finishing tenth with top-ten finishes in both stages. At Sonoma, a track he considers "one of [his] worst," he delivered an impressive performance, earning a race-high 49 points with two top-five stage finishes and taking fourth place overall in the Toyota/Save Mart 350.

He scored his first pole of the 2018 season at the Coke Zero Sugar 400 at Daytona, recording a lap 0.240 seconds faster than the rest of the field during qualifying. However, his race ended prematurely the following day in the "big one" on lap 54, when Ricky Stenhouse Jr. turned Brad Keselowski near the front of the pack, triggering a massive crash involving 25 other drivers and resulting in a 34th-place finish for Elliott. At the Go Bowling at The Glen, Elliott started third, won Stage 2 for the third consecutive week (following Loudon and Pocono), and led the final 33 laps to claim his first career Cup Series victory. The win mirrored his father Bill Elliott's career in several ways: both drivers finished second eight times before earning their first win, and both secured their maiden victories on road courses (Bill's first win came at the now-defunct Riverside International Raceway). Notably, Bill also served as one of Chase's spotters during the race. The victory marked Hendrick Motorsports' 250th Cup Series win and made Elliott the youngest driver to win on a road course. In a memorable post-race moment, teammate Jimmie Johnson gave Elliott's car a push after it ran out of fuel while Elliott was being congratulated by fellow drivers.

Elliott qualified for the 2018 playoffs and earned his second career victory on October 7 at Dover, holding off Denny Hamlin in overtime. The win secured his spot in the third round. Following a chaotic final lap at Talladega, Elliott claimed another victory later that month at Kansas, fending off a late charge from Kyle Busch. He advanced to the Round of 8 but was eliminated after a late crash involving Denny Hamlin and Kurt Busch at Phoenix. Elliott ultimately finished the season sixth in the points standings.

===== 2019: Continued Cup Series success =====
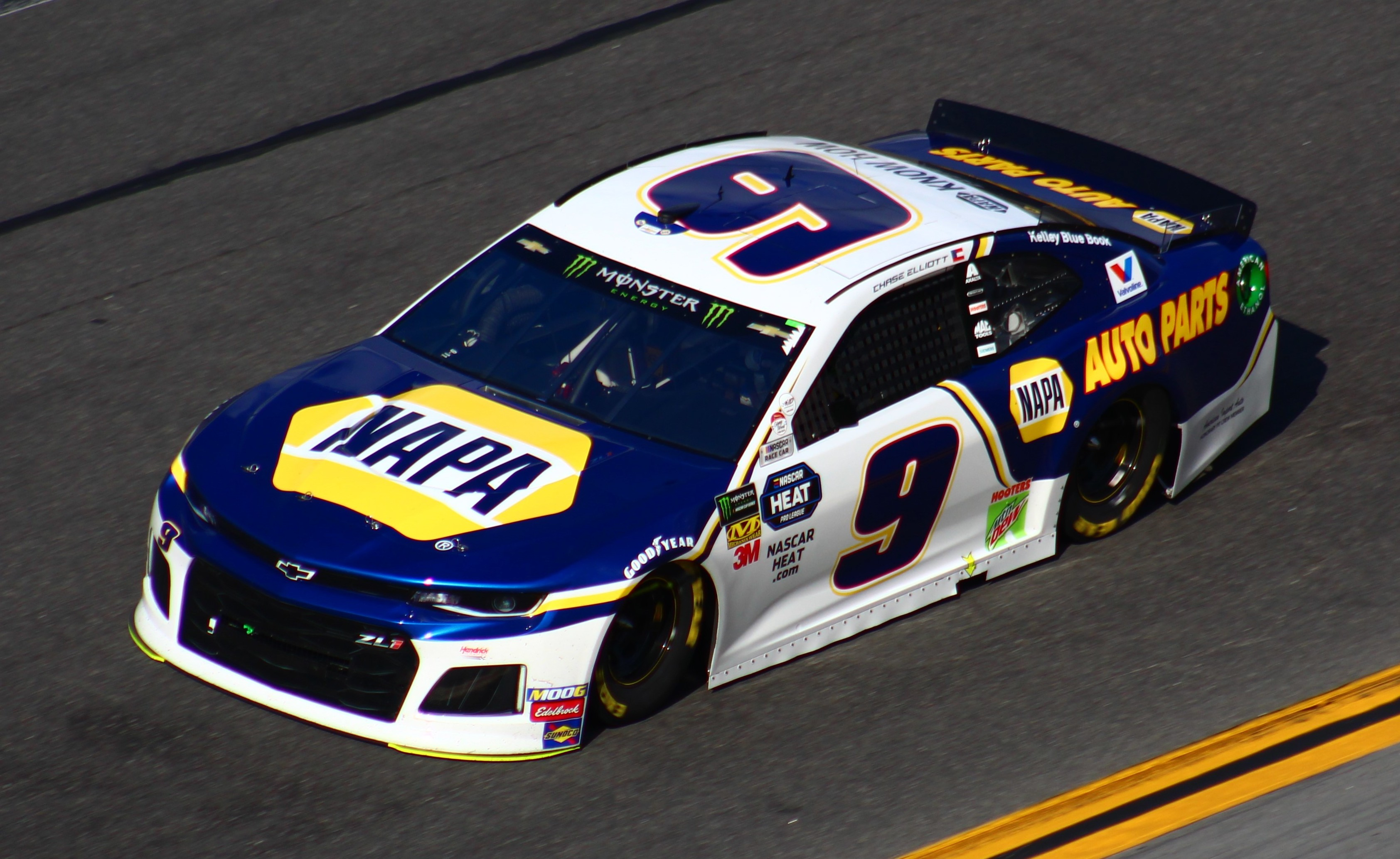
Elliott's No. 9 at Daytona International Speedway in 2019

Elliott began the 2019 season by qualifying eighteenth for the Daytona 500. He spent most of the race running mid-pack before being involved in a wreck on lap 200, finishing 17th. The following week at Atlanta, he qualified 22nd and finished nineteenth, marking his second consecutive finish outside the top ten. At Las Vegas, Elliott secured his first top-ten finish of the season with a ninth-place result. He followed this with a strong performance at Martinsville, finishing second after losing the lead with 126 laps remaining. Elliott earned his first victory of the season at Talladega when a crash under the white flag ended the race under caution. Later in the year, he defeated Martin Truex Jr. at Watkins Glen for the second consecutive season. Elliott advanced through the first round of the playoffs with a fourth-place finish at Las Vegas, a 13th at Richmond, and a dramatic win at the Charlotte Roval. During the Roval race, he locked his brakes and hit the turn 1 tire barrier while leading on lap 65. Despite the setback, he capitalized on cautions and regained the lead on lap 104, securing his third win of the season and the sixth of his career. However, Elliott faced challenges in the later stages of the playoffs. He finished 38th at Dover due to an engine failure on lap seven. He advanced to the Round of 8 after a runner-up finish at Kansas but failed to make the Championship 4 after crashing and finishing 39th at Phoenix.

===== 2020: Cup Series Champion =====
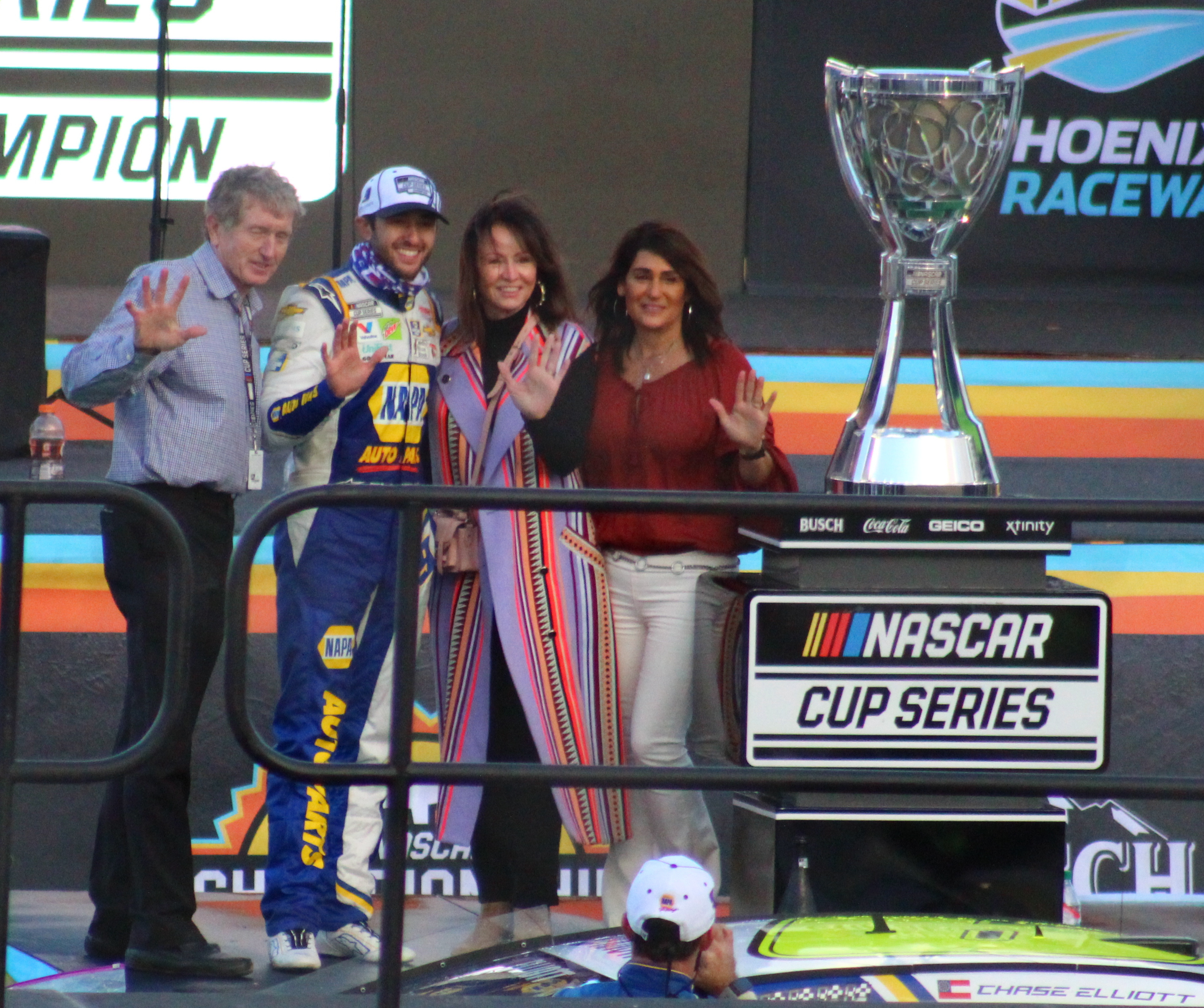
Elliott after winning the 2020 NASCAR Cup Series Championship

Elliott began the 2020 season with a stage win and a seventeenth-place finish in the Daytona 500. The following week at Las Vegas, he won the first two stages but suffered a flat tire on lap 220, spinning into the turn one wall and finishing 26th. He bounced back with three consecutive top-ten finishes, including winning the pole and leading a race-high 93 laps at Phoenix, though a late brush with the wall relegated him to a seventh-place finish.

Elliott faced a string of late-race misfortunes in the following events. In the Toyota 500 at Darlington, with 28 laps to go, Kyle Busch turned Elliott while he was running second, prompting Elliott to give Busch a one-finger salute as he drove by. In the next Cup Series race, the Coca-Cola 600—one of the few Crown Jewels his father Bill never won—Elliott was leading late when a flat tire on teammate William Byron's car triggered a caution and overtime. Elliott's team opted to pit before the restart, dropping him out of the lead. He finished third but was later promoted to second after teammate Jimmie Johnson was disqualified. Elliott bounced back by winning the Alsco Uniforms 500, passing Kevin Harvick for the lead with 27 laps to go. However, his momentum faltered at Bristol, where he was poised for a second consecutive win until contact with Joey Logano with three laps remaining dropped him to 22nd. The incident led to a post-race discussion between the two drivers.

In July, Elliott won the NASCAR All-Star Race at Bristol, dominating the event by winning two of the first three stages and leading the final segment. This victory made the Elliotts only the second father-son duo to win the All-Star Race, joining Dale Earnhardt and Dale Earnhardt Jr. Notably, both Elliott wins occurred at alternate venues; Bill Elliott's 1986 victory took place at Atlanta instead of the traditional host, Charlotte. A month later, during the inaugural Go Bowling 235 on the Daytona International Speedway road course, Elliott led a race-high 34 laps to secure his second points-paying victory of the season and his third consecutive road course win. This performance elevated him to the highest all-time winning percentage on road courses at 36.36%.

In the first race of the playoffs, the Cook Out Southern 500, Elliott's car featured a throwback paint scheme honoring his teammate, mentor, and friend Jimmie Johnson. Elliott ran near the front for much of the race and was leading with less than twenty laps to go when Martin Truex Jr. attempted a pass after a strong run. The two made contact, sending both cars into the wall and causing significant damage that affected their speed and track position. Despite opting not to pit, Elliott ultimately dropped to a twentieth-place finish.

In the Bank of America Roval 400, Elliott had one of the strongest cars of the race. Starting second, he tied teammate William Byron for the most laps led and secured his fourth consecutive road course victory. This win made Elliott both the youngest and oldest driver to claim victory at the Roval. Heading into Martinsville's Xfinity 500, Elliott needed a win to advance to the Championship 4. He finished fourth in Stage 1, dominated Stage 2 to take the stage win, and passed Martin Truex Jr. with 43 laps remaining to clinch the victory, securing his spot in the Championship Round at Phoenix.

Elliott started last in the Season Finale 500 after failing pre-race inspection twice but went on to lead a race-high 153 laps, securing both the race victory and the championship. At 24 years old, he became the second-youngest driver to win a Cup Series championship. Together with his father, the Elliotts became the third father-son duo to win Cup Series titles, following the Pettys (Lee and Richard) and the Jarretts (Ned and Dale).

===== 2021: Title defense and feud with Kevin Harvick =====
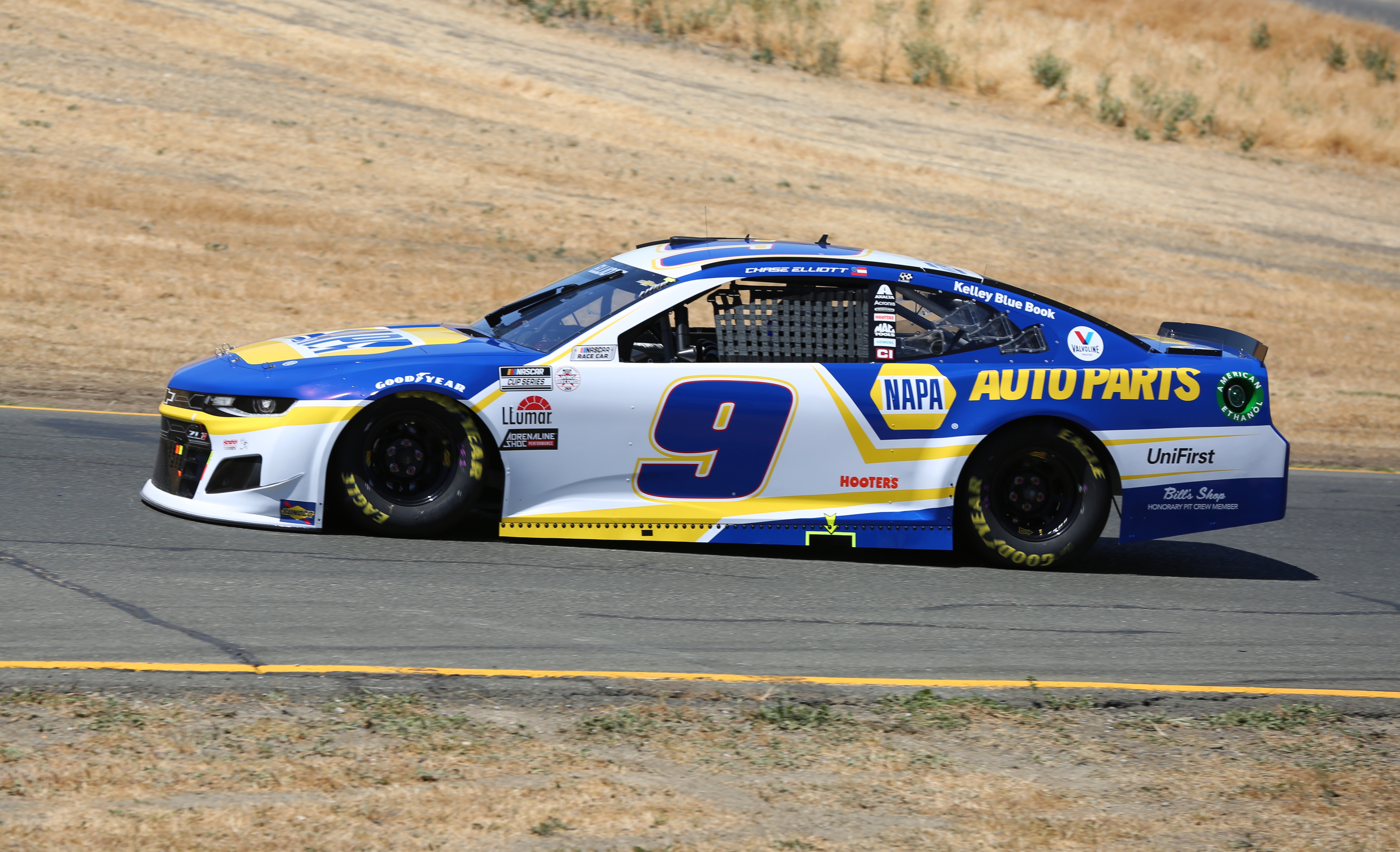
Elliott's No. 9 at Sonoma Raceway in 2021

The early 2021 NASCAR season was a rollercoaster for Elliott. After finishing second in the Daytona 500, he led much of the following race at the Daytona Road Course. However, a caution for rain prompted a pit stop, and a spin with six laps remaining dropped him to 21st. In May, Elliott secured his first win of the season at the inaugural race at Circuit of the Americas, delayed by rain. This victory marked two milestones: Hendrick Motorsports' 268th Cup win, tying Petty Enterprises for the most Cup victories by a team in NASCAR history, and Chevrolet's 800th Cup win as a manufacturer. Elliott finished thirteenth at the inaugural Ally 400 in Nashville but was disqualified after post-race inspection revealed five loose lug nuts. He rebounded a few weeks later at Road America, claiming another victory by beating Christopher Bell and Kyle Busch. The season also featured heated moments, particularly during the Bristol Night Race, where Elliott clashed with Kevin Harvick. Their feud continued at the Charlotte Roval, where Harvick intentionally wrecked Elliott, only to later crash out of the race himself.

At the Xfinity 500, Elliott swept both stages, earning enough points to secure a spot in the NASCAR Cup Series Championship Race. Competing against teammate Kyle Larson and Joe Gibbs Racing drivers Denny Hamlin and Martin Truex Jr., Elliott finished fifth, the lowest among the Championship 4 contenders, and failed to defend his title.

===== 2022: Regular season champion =====
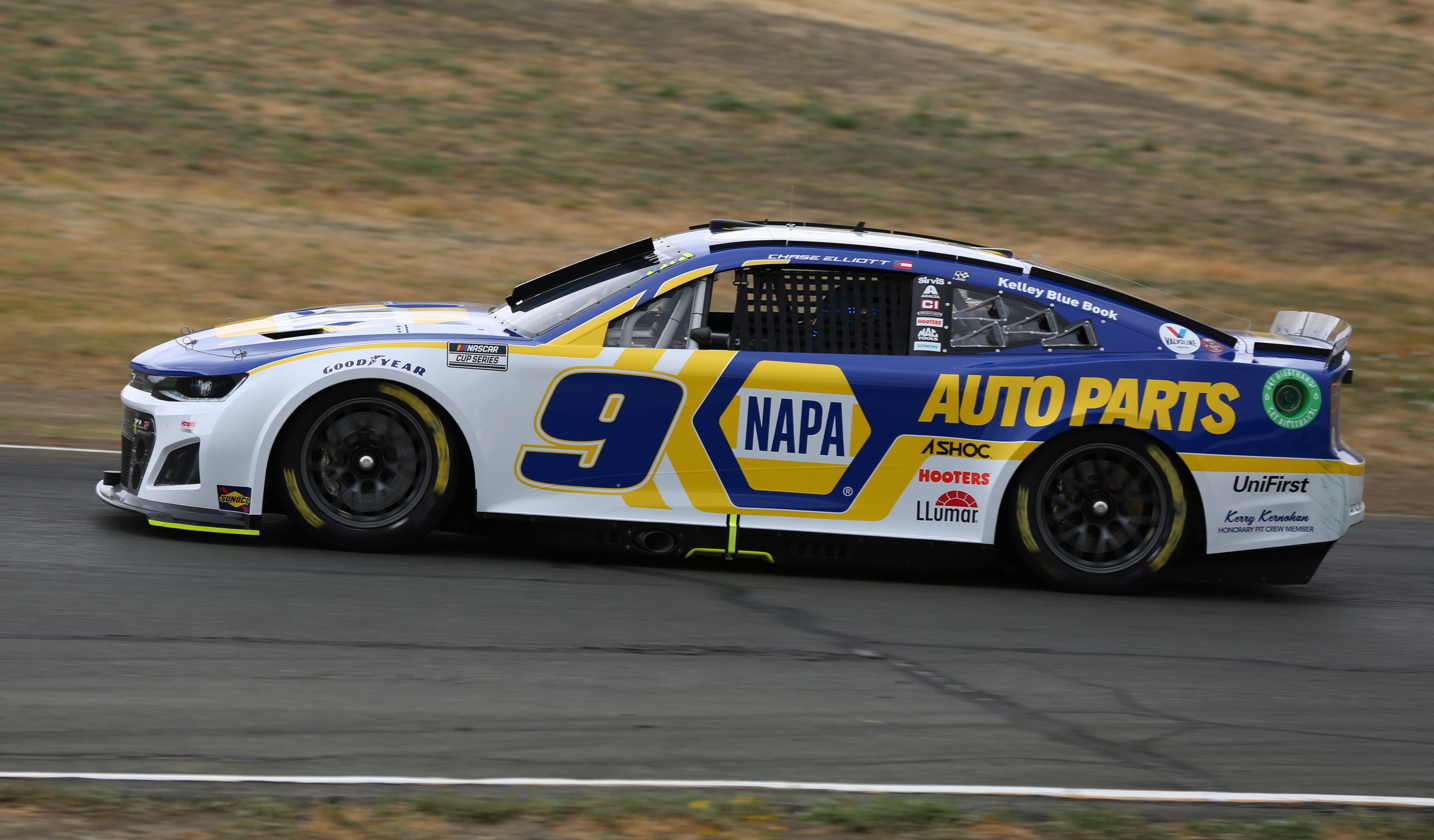
Elliott's No. 9 car at Sonoma Raceway in 2022

Elliott's 2022 season began with a tenth-place finish in the Daytona 500. However, his second race at California was marked by controversy, as Hendrick Motorsports teammate and eventual race winner Kyle Larson made contact with Elliott in Turn 1, sending him into the wall and resulting in a 26th place finish. Despite the setback, Elliott rebounded with ten consecutive top-fifteen finishes. This stretch included a fourth place result at Circuit of the Americas, a pole win and tenth place finish at Martinsville, his first win of the season at Dover, and a fifth place finish at Darlington. After Darlington, Elliott faced a rough patch. He finished 29th at Kansas after losing a tire late in the race, crashed out during the All-Star Race, and led 86 of the first 188 laps in the Coca-Cola 600 before getting caught in a crash and failing to finish. The struggles continued with a 21st-place finish at Gateway following contact with Ross Chastain.

After an eighth-place rebound at Sonoma, Elliott hit a hot streak with five straight finishes of first or second. He earned his second win of the season at Nashville, leading 42 of 300 laps. At Road America, Elliott led 36 of 62 laps but finished second after being passed by Tyler Reddick, who claimed his first Cup Series win. Elliott bounced back with a dominant victory at Atlanta, winning both stages and leading 96 of 260 laps for his third win of the season. This victory made him and his father, Bill, the second father-son duo to win at Atlanta, joining Dale Earnhardt and Dale Earnhardt Jr., and the only Georgia-born drivers to do so. At New Hampshire, Elliott finished second after leading late but was overtaken by Christopher Bell with 41 laps remaining. He followed this with a 3rd-place finish at Pocono but was later awarded his fourth win when Denny Hamlin and Kyle Busch were disqualified for failing post-race inspections.

Following a fifth-place finish at Richmond and a fourth-place finish at Watkins Glen, Elliott secured the 2022 NASCAR regular-season championship with one race remaining. In the final regular-season race at Daytona, Elliott started on the outside pole and led a race-high 31 of 160 laps. However, he was involved in a major multi-car crash caused by rain and ultimately finished 29th.

At the Southern 500, Elliott finished 36th after a crash caused catastrophic rear suspension damage. However, he bounced back with an eleventh-place finish at Kansas and a runner-up result to Chris Buescher at the Bristol Night Race, securing his spot in the Round of 12. On October 2, Elliott claimed his second career victory at Talladega, clinching a spot in the Round of 8. The win marked his series-high fifth victory of the season, tying his career-best performance from his championship-winning 2020 season. Elliott's championship hopes ended at the Phoenix finale, where he finished 28th after being spun into the inside wall by Ross Chastain with 119 laps remaining, ultimately finishing fourth in the points standings.

===== 2023: Leg injury, suspension, and missing the playoffs, third winless season =====
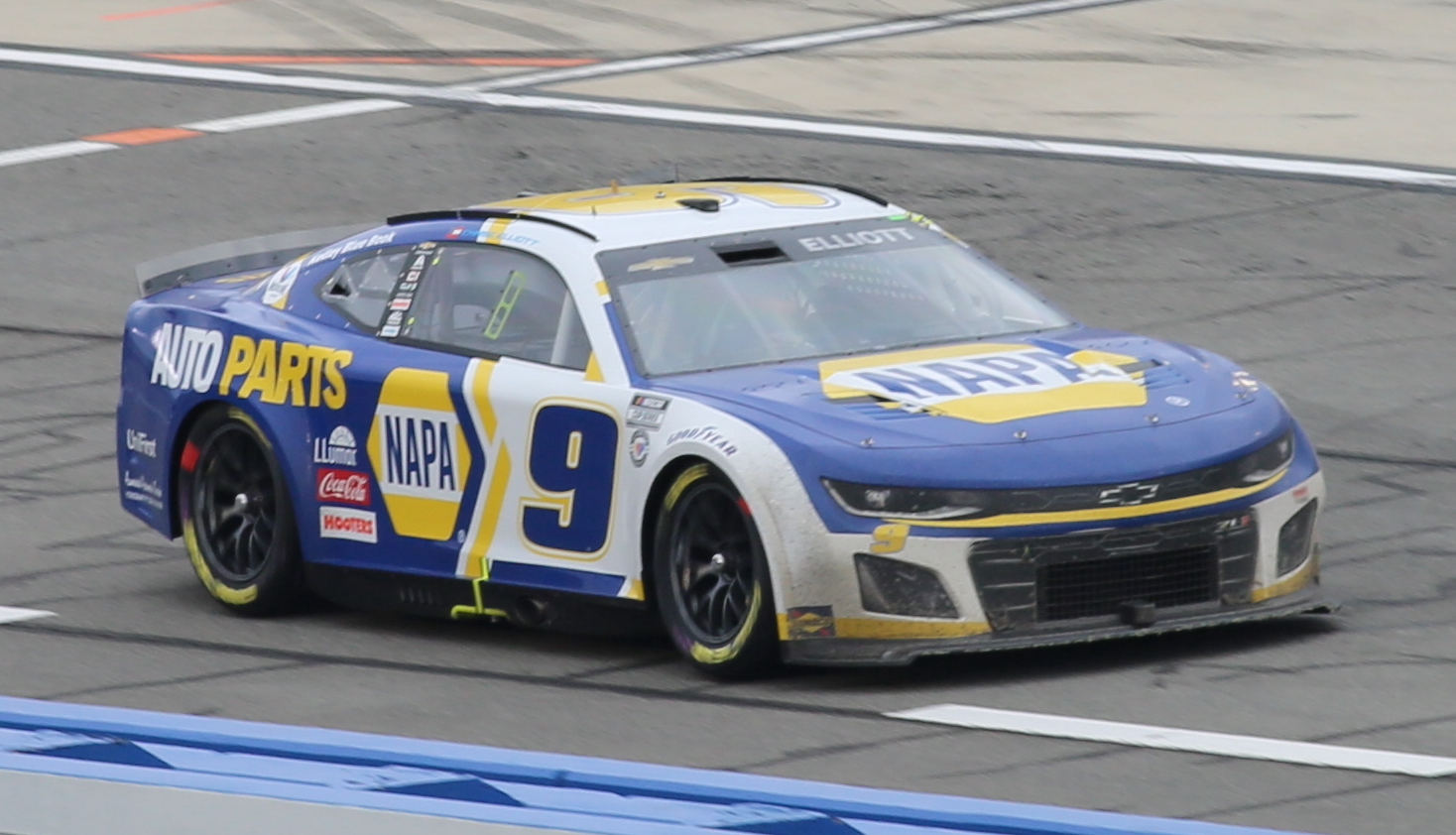
Elliott's No. 9 car at Auto Club Speedway in 2023

Elliott began the 2023 season with a 38th-place finish at the Daytona 500 but rebounded with a strong second-place finish at Fontana a week later. On March 3, 2023, Xfinity Series driver Josh Berry was announced as the substitute driver for the No. 9 car after Elliott sustained a fractured tibia while snowboarding in Colorado. On March 15, the No. 9 team received an L2 penalty after unapproved hood louvers were discovered during a pre-race inspection at Phoenix. The penalty did not affect Elliott's driver points due to his injury, as substitute drivers in the No. 9 were ineligible for points. Elliott returned to the No. 9 car at Martinsville, where he finished tenth. Later, at Charlotte, Elliott was involved in an incident with Denny Hamlin, who got loose underneath him and made contact. In retaliation, Elliott intentionally right-rear hooked Hamlin, causing both cars to crash. As a result, NASCAR suspended Elliott for one race. Corey LaJoie was announced as the substitute driver for the No. 9 at Gateway. Despite his efforts, Elliott was unable to secure a victory to compensate for the races he missed, causing him to miss the playoffs for the first time in his Cup Series career.

===== 2024: Bounceback year =====
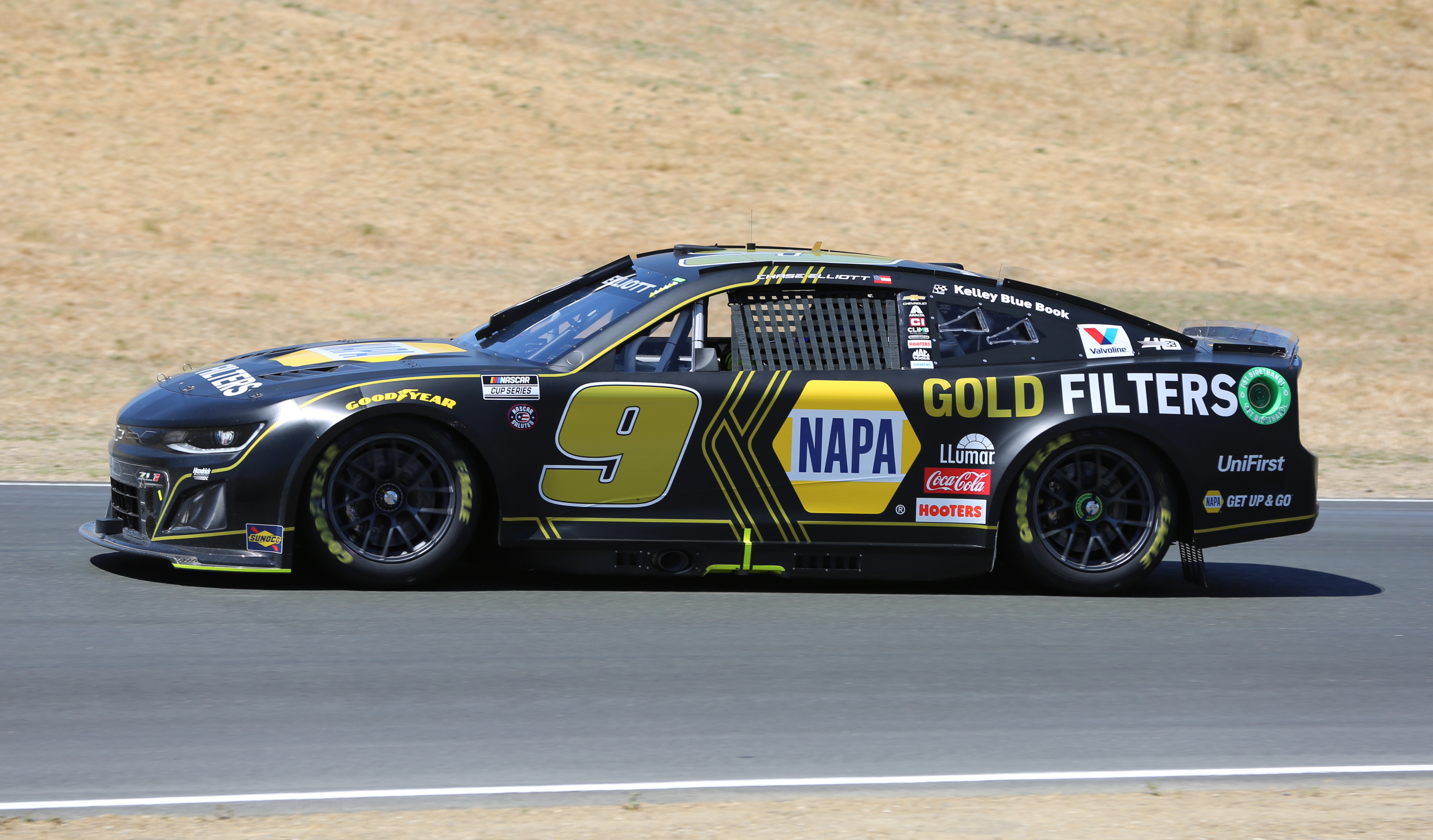
Elliott competing in the 2024 Toyota/Save Mart 350 at Sonoma Raceway.

Elliott began the 2024 season with a 14th-place finish in the Daytona 500. On April 14, he claimed victory at Texas, ending a 42-race winless streak. This win marked Hooters' first as a sponsor since Alan Kulwicki's championship season in 1992. However, it was Elliott's only win of the season, and he failed to qualify for the Championship 4. On July 1, Hendrick Motorsports announced the end of their partnership with Hooters, as the restaurant chain was unable to fulfill its sponsorship obligations for the No. 9 team. During the playoffs, Elliott was winless, but he scored four top-three finishes; however, a DNF at Las Vegas and not winning in the round resulted in him being eliminated after the Round of 8, finishing seventh in the points standings.

===== 2025 =====
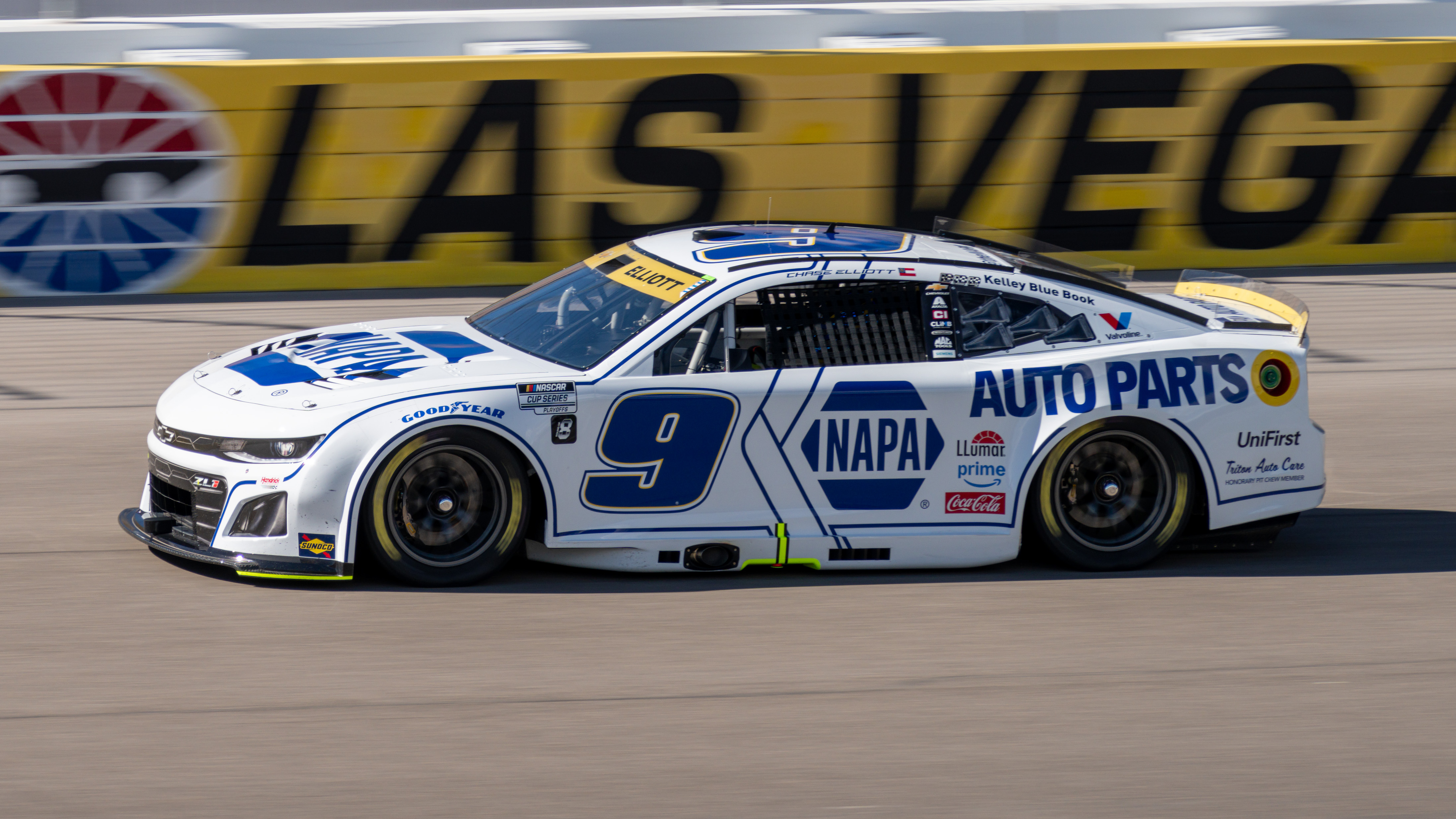
Elliott practicing for the 2025 South Point 400

In 2025, Elliott opened the season with a victory at the Cook Out Clash. Elliott started the regular season with a 15th-place finish at the 2025 Daytona 500. After staying consistent throughout the year, he earned his 20th career victory at Atlanta after passing Brad Keselowski on the final lap. During the playoffs, Elliott won at Kansas. He ultimately finished the season 8th in the standings.

===== 2026 =====
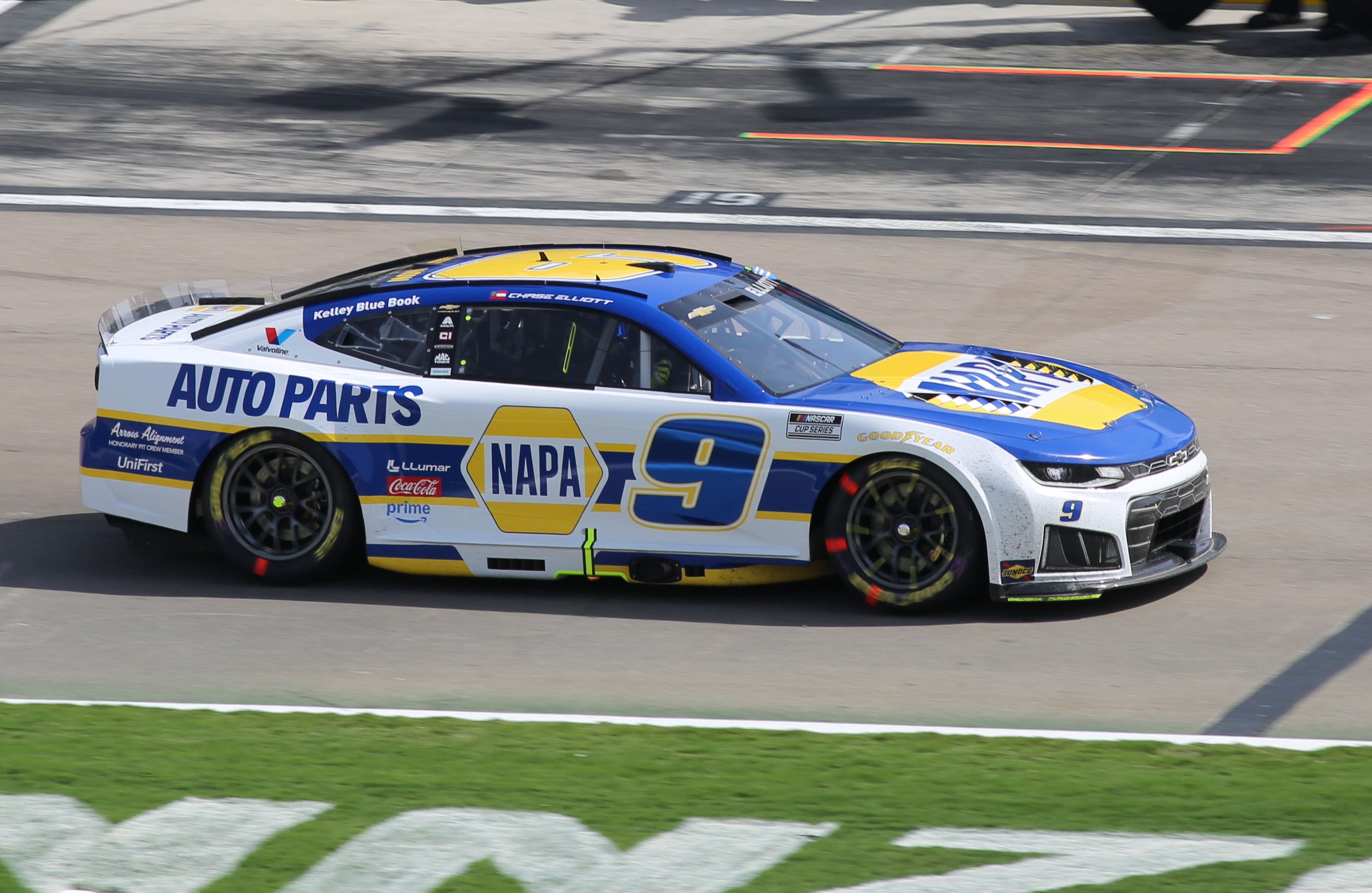
Elliott's No. 9 car at Las Vegas Motor Speedway in 2026

Elliott began the 2026 season with a fourth place finish at the 2026 Daytona 500. During the regular season, he scored wins at Martinsville and Texas.

=== Other racing ===
In 2021, Elliott made his debut in the 24 Hours of Daytona, driving the No. 31 Cadillac for Action Express Racing alongside Mike Conway, Pipo Derani, and Felipe Nasr. Despite starting on the pole, the car faced multiple mechanical issues, leaving Elliott to complete a stint while the team was 22 laps behind the leader. The race ended prematurely for the team with four hours remaining due to a gear failure.

Elliott has competed in the Superstar Racing Experience (SRX) twice. In the 2021 season finale at Nashville Fairgrounds Speedway, he started fourth and battled his father, Bill, throughout the second half of the race before passing him to secure the victory. This marked the second time the father-son duo raced against each other, the first being a late model race at South Alabama Speedway in 2013. In the 2022 season finale at Sharon Speedway, Elliott won his second heat race and went on to claim victory in the main event after a duel with Tony Stewart.

== In popular culture ==
=== Television and film appearances ===
Elliott has made appearances on television, including CMT's The Dude Perfect Show. He voices the character Mark Set-Go on Nickelodeon's Blaze and the Monster Machines and Chase Racelott in the 2017 Pixar film Cars 3.

Elliott served as a Fox NASCAR analyst for the 2017 Xfinity Series race at Atlanta. He returned to Fox as a remote guest commentator for the 2023 EchoPark Automotive Grand Prix while recovering from a broken leg.

In 2021, Elliott was the subject of a documentary with Dale Earnhardt Jr. called Chase which talks about the story of his racing career.

=== Magazines ===
Elliott has appeared on the cover of magazines, including NASCAR Illustrated; NASCAR Pole Position; and Georgia Magazine.

=== Video games ===
Elliott is featured as a playable driver in Forza Motorsport 6, via the NASCAR expansion pack. The expansion features twenty-four paint schemes from the 2016 Sprint Cup Series season, including Elliott's No. 24 NAPA SS. Elliott, along with Jimmie Johnson and Kyle Busch, provide commentary in the expansion as the "voices of motorsport". Elliott and Johnson also had roles in developing the expansion.

Elliott has been a driver in all of the NASCAR Heat series of games by 704Games. All four 2018 Hendrick drivers, including Elliott, were on the cover of NASCAR Heat 3, which was released September 7, 2018. Elliott also appeared by himself on the cover for the 2020 NASCAR Heat 5, is featured on the cover of the 2021 Nintendo Switch-exclusive NASCAR Heat: Ultimate Edition+, and is one of three drivers on the cover of NASCAR 21: Ignition. He is also in the 2022 Nintendo Switch-exclusive NASCAR Rivals along with his car and 2022 paint schemes.

== Motorsports career results ==
=== Career summary ===
| Season | Series | Team | Races | Wins | Top 5s | Top 10s | Stage Wins | Poles | Points | Position |
|---|---|---|---|---|---|---|---|---|---|---|
| 2010 | CARS X-1R Pro Cup Series | Ford Racing | 9 | 0 | 5 | 8 | N/A | 0 | 492 | 19th |
| 2011 | CARS X-1R Pro Cup Series | Hendrick Motorsports | 2 | 1 | 2 | 2 | N/A | 1 | 300 | 22nd |
| 2011 | NASCAR K&N Pro Series East | Hendrick Motorsports | 12 | 0 | 3 | 6 | N/A | 0 | 1510 | 9th |
| 2011 | NASCAR K&N Pro Series West | Hendrick Motorsports | 1 | 0 | 1 | 1 | N/A | 0 | 165 | 67th |
| 2012 | NASCAR K&N Pro Series East | Hendrick Motorsports | 14 | 1 | 6 | 9 | N/A | 1 | 500 | 4th |
| 2012 | ARCA Racing Series | Hendrick Motorsports | 6 | 0 | 3 | 6 | N/A | 1 | 1260 | 25th |
| 2012 | NASCAR K&N Pro Series West | Hendrick Motorsports | 2 | 0 | 1 | 1 | N/A | 0 | 67 | 38th |
| 2013 | NASCAR Camping World Truck Series | Hendrick Motorsports | 9 | 1 | 5 | 7 | N/A | 1 | 315 | 22nd |
| 2013 | ARCA Racing Series | Hendrick Motorsports | 5 | 1 | 3 | 4 | N/A | 0 | 975 | 28th |
| 2014 | NASCAR Nationwide Series | JR Motorsports | 33 | 3 | 16 | 26 | N/A | 2 | 1213 | **1st** |
| 2014 | ARCA Racing Series | Hendrick Motorsports | 1 | 0 | 0 | 1 | N/A | 0 | 185 | 86th |
| 2015 | NASCAR Xfinity Series | JR Motorsports | 33 | 1 | 11 | 27 | N/A | 0 | 1175 | 2nd |
| 2015 | NASCAR Sprint Cup Series | Hendrick Motorsports | 5 | 0 | 0 | 0 | N/A | 0 | 0 | 59th |
| 2016 | NASCAR Sprint Cup Series | Hendrick Motorsports | 36 | 0 | 10 | 17 | N/A | 2 | 2285 | 10th |
| 2016 | NASCAR Xfinity Series | JR Motorsports | 5 | 1 | 4 | 5 | N/A | 0 | 0 | 90th |
| 2016 | NASCAR Camping World Truck Series | Contreras Motorsports | 1 | 0 | 1 | 1 | N/A | 1 | 0 | 83rd |
| 2016 | NASCAR K&N Pro Series West | HScott Motorsports | 1 | 1 | 1 | 1 | N/A | 1 | 47 | 38th |
| 2017 | Monster Energy NASCAR Cup Series | Hendrick Motorsports | 36 | 0 | 12 | 21 | 4* | 1 | 2377 | 5th |
| 2017 | NASCAR Camping World Truck Series | GMS Racing | 2 | 1 | 1 | 2 | 1 | 1 | 0 | 76th |
| 2018 | Monster Energy NASCAR Cup Series | Hendrick Motorsports | 36 | 3 | 11 | 21 | 5* | 1 | 2350 | 6th |
| 2018 | NASCAR Xfinity Series | JR Motorsports | 1 | 0 | 0 | 0 | 1 | 0 | 0 | 90th |
| 2018 | NASCAR Xfinity Series | GMS Racing | 7 | 0 | 2 | 5 | 0 | 0 | 0 | 90th |
| 2019 | Monster Energy NASCAR Cup Series | Hendrick Motorsports | 36 | 3 | 11 | 15 | 5 | **4** | 2275 | 10th |
| 2019 | NASCAR Xfinity Series | JR Motorsports | 1 | 0 | 0 | 0 | 0 | 1 | 0 | 90th |
| 2020 | NASCAR Cup Series | Hendrick Motorsports | 36 | **5** | **15** | **22** | **10** | 1 | 5040 | **1st** |
| 2020 | NASCAR Gander RV & Outdoors Truck Series | GMS Racing | 3 | 1 | 2 | 2 | 1 | 0 | 0 | 79th |
| 2021 | NASCAR Cup Series | Hendrick Motorsports | 36 | 2 | **15** | 21 | 6 | 0 | 5032 | 4th |
| 2021 | NASCAR Xfinity Series | JR Motorsports | 1 | 0 | 1 | 1 | 0 | 0 | 0 | 78th |
| 2021 | NASCAR Camping World Truck Series | GMS Racing | 1 | 0 | 1 | 1 | 0 | 0 | 0 | 97th |
| 2021 | Camping World SRX Series | NAPA Auto Parts | 1 | 1 | 1 | 1 | 0 | 0 | 41 | 14th |
| 2021 | WeatherTech SportsCar Championship | Whelen Engineering Racing | 1 | 0 | 0 | 1 | N/A | 0 | 285 | 17th |
| 2022 | NASCAR Cup Series | Hendrick Motorsports | 36 | 5 | 12 | 20 | 6 | 3 | 5009 | 4th |
| 2022 | NASCAR Camping World Truck Series | Spire Motorsports | 1 | 0 | 0 | 1 | 0 | 0 | 0 | 92nd |
| 2022 | SRX Series | ASHOC Energy | 1 | 1 | 1 | 1 | 1 | 0 | 43 | 13th |
| 2023 | NASCAR Cup Series | Hendrick Motorsports | 29 | 0 | 7 | 15 | 2 | 0 | 820 | 17th |
| 2023 | NASCAR Xfinity Series | Hendrick Motorsports | 1 | 0 | 1 | 1 | 0 | 0 | 0 | 79th |
| 2023 | NASCAR Craftsman Truck Series | McAnally–Hilgemann Racing | 1 | 0 | 0 | 1 | 0 | 0 | 0 | 98th |
| 2024 | NASCAR Cup Series | Hendrick Motorsports | 36 | 1 | 11 | 19 | 2 | 0 | 2342 | 7th |
| 2024 | NASCAR Xfinity Series | Hendrick Motorsports | 2 | 1 | 2 | 2 | 0 | 0 | 0 | N/A |
| 2025 | NASCAR Cup Series | Hendrick Motorsports | 36 | 2 | 11 | 19 | 1 | 0 | 2310 | 8th |
| 2025 | NASCAR Xfinity Series | Hendrick Motorsports | 2 | 0 | 2 | 2 | 0 | 1 | 0 | N/A |
| 2026 | NASCAR Cup Series | Hendrick Motorsports | 36 | 2 | 8 | 13 | 1 | 0 | 2287 | 12th |
| 2026 | NASCAR O'Reilly Auto Parts Series | JR Motorsports | 2 | 0 | 2 | 2 | 0 | 0 | 0 | N/A |
| 2026 | NASCAR Craftsman Truck Series | Spire Motorsports | 1 | 0 | 0 | 1 | 0 | 0 | 0 | N/A |
| NASCAR Cup Series | | | 394 | 23 | 123 | 203 | 37* | 12 | 1st (2020) | |
| NASCAR O'Reilly Auto Parts Series | | | 89 | 6 | 41 | 73 | 1 | 3 | 1st (2014) | |
| NASCAR Craftsman Truck Series | | | 19 | 3 | 11 | 16 | 2 | 4 | 22nd (2013) | |
| K&N Pro Series East | | | 26 | 1 | 9 | 15 | N/A | 1 | 4th (2012) | |
| K&N Pro Series West | | | 4 | 1 | 3 | 3 | N/A | 1 | 38th (2012) | |
| ARCA Racing Series | | | 12 | 1 | 6 | 11 | N/A | 1 | 25th (2012) | |
| Superstar Racing Experience | | | 2 | 2 | 2 | 2 | 1 | 0 | 13th (2022) | |
| CARS X-1R Pro Cup Series | | | 11 | 1 | 7 | 10 | N/A | 0 | 19th (2010) | |
| IMSA SportsCar Championship | | | 1 | 0 | 0 | 1 | N/A | 0 | 17th (2021) | |

NOTE: The asterisk denotes Elliott won a Daytona 500 qualifying race, which counts as a stage win for championship purposes (ten points) but not a playoff point.

=== NASCAR ===
(key) (Bold – Pole position awarded by qualifying time. Italics – Pole position earned by points standings or practice time. * – Most laps led.)

==== Cup Series ====
NASCAR Cup Series results
| Year | Team | No. | Make | 1 | 2 | 3 | 4 | 5 | 6 | 7 | 8 | 9 | 10 | 11 | 12 | 13 | 14 | 15 | 16 | 17 | 18 | 19 | 20 | 21 | 22 | 23 | 24 | 25 | 26 | 27 | 28 | 29 | 30 | 31 | 32 | 33 | 34 | 35 | 36 | NCSC | Pts | Ref |
|---|---|---|---|---|---|---|---|---|---|---|---|---|---|---|---|---|---|---|---|---|---|---|---|---|---|---|---|---|---|---|---|---|---|---|---|---|---|---|---|---|---|---|
| 2015 | Hendrick Motorsports | 25 | Chevy | DAY | ATL | LVS | PHO | CAL | MAR; 38 | TEX | BRI | RCH; 16 | TAL | KAN | CLT; 18 | DOV | POC | MCH | SON | DAY | KEN | NHA | IND; 18 | POC | GLN | MCH | BRI | DAR; 41 | RCH | CHI | NHA | DOV | CLT | KAN | TAL | MAR | TEX | PHO | HOM | 59th | 0^{1} | |
| 2016 | Hendrick Motorsports | 24 | Chevy | **DAY**; 37 | ATL; 8 | LVS; 38 | PHO; 8 | CAL; 6 | MAR; 20 | TEX; 5 | BRI; 4 | RCH; 12 | **TAL**; 5 | KAN; 9 | DOV; 3 | CLT; 8 | POC; 4* | MCH; 2 | SON; 21 | DAY; 32 | KEN; 31 | NHA; 34 | IND; 15 | POC; 33 | GLN; 13 | BRI; 15 | MCH; 2 | DAR; 10 | RCH; 19 | CHI; 3 | NHA; 13 | DOV; 3 | CLT; 33 | KAN; 31 | TAL; 12 | MAR; 12 | TEX; 4 | PHO; 9 | HOM; 11 | 10th | 2285 | |
| 2017 | Hendrick Motorsports | 24 | Chevy | **DAY**; 14 | ATL; 5 | LVS; 3 | PHO; 12 | CAL; 10 | MAR; 3 | TEX; 9 | BRI; 7 | RCH; 24 | TAL; 30 | KAN; 29 | CLT; 38 | DOV; 5 | POC; 8 | MCH; 2 | SON; 8 | DAY; 22 | KEN; 3 | NHA; 11 | IND; 39 | POC; 10 | GLN; 13 | MCH; 8 | BRI; 18 | DAR; 11 | RCH; 10 | CHI; 2 | NHA; 11 | DOV; 2* | CLT; 2 | TAL; 16 | KAN; 4 | MAR; 27 | TEX; 8 | PHO; 2 | HOM; 5 | 5th | 2377 | |
| 2018 | Hendrick Motorsports | 9 | Chevy | DAY; 33 | ATL; 10 | LVS; 34 | PHO; 3 | CAL; 16 | MAR; 9 | TEX; 11 | BRI; 29 | RCH; 2 | TAL; 3 | DOV; 12 | KAN; 12 | CLT; 11 | POC; 10 | MCH; 9 | SON; 4 | CHI; 19 | **DAY**; 34 | KEN; 13 | NHA; 5 | POC; 7 | GLN; 1* | MCH; 9 | BRI; 3 | DAR; 5 | IND; 15 | LVS; 36 | RCH; 4 | ROV; 6 | DOV; 1 | TAL; 31 | KAN; 1 | MAR; 7 | TEX; 6 | PHO; 23 | HOM; 7 | 6th | 2350 | |
| 2019 | Hendrick Motorsports | 9 | Chevy | DAY; 17 | ATL; 19 | LVS; 9 | PHO; 14 | CAL; 11 | MAR; 2 | TEX; 13 | **BRI**; 11 | RCH; 15 | TAL; 1* | **DOV**; 5* | KAN; 4 | CLT; 4 | POC; 4 | MCH; 20 | SON; 37 | CHI; 11 | DAY; 35 | KEN; 15 | NHA; 29 | POC; 38 | **GLN**; 1* | MCH; 9 | BRI; 5 | DAR; 19 | IND; 9 | LVS; 4 | RCH; 13 | ROV; 1* | DOV; 38 | **TAL**; 8 | KAN; 2 | MAR; 36 | TEX; 32 | PHO; 39 | HOM; 15 | 10th | 2275 | |
| 2020 | Hendrick Motorsports | 9 | Chevy | DAY; 17 | LVS; 26 | CAL; 4 | **PHO**; 7* | DAR; 4 | DAR; 38 | CLT; 2 | CLT; 1 | BRI; 22 | ATL; 8 | MAR; 5 | HOM; 2 | TAL; 38 | POC; 25 | POC; 4 | IND; 11 | KEN; 23 | TEX; 12 | KAN; 12 | NHA; 9 | MCH; 7 | MCH; 9 | DRC; 1* | DOV; 5 | DOV; 39 | DAY; 2 | DAR; 20 | RCH; 5 | BRI; 7 | LVS; 22 | TAL; 5 | ROV; 1* | KAN; 6 | TEX; 20 | MAR; 1* | PHO; 1* | 1st | 5040 | |
| 2021 | Hendrick Motorsports | 9 | Chevy | DAY; 2 | DRC; 21* | HOM; 14 | LVS; 13 | PHO; 5 | ATL; 38 | BRD; 10 | MAR; 2 | RCH; 12 | TAL; 24 | KAN; 5 | DAR; 7 | DOV; 3 | COA; 1 | CLT; 2 | SON; 2 | NSH; 39 | POC; 12 | POC; 27 | ROA; 1* | ATL; 7 | NHA; 18 | GLN; 2 | IRC; 4 | MCH; 8 | DAY; 8 | DAR; 31 | RCH; 4 | BRI; 25 | LVS; 2 | TAL; 18 | ROV; 12 | TEX; 7 | KAN; 2 | MAR; 16* | PHO; 5 | 4th | 5032 | |
| 2022 | Hendrick Motorsports | 9 | Chevy | DAY; 10 | CAL; 26 | LVS; 9 | PHO; 11 | ATL; 6 | COA; 4 | RCH; 14 | **MAR**; 10 | BRD; 8 | TAL; 7 | DOV; 1 | DAR; 5 | KAN; 29 | CLT; 33 | GTW; 21 | SON; 8 | NSH; 1 | **ROA**; 2* | ATL; 1* | NHA; 2 | POC; 1 | IRC; 16 | MCH; 11 | RCH; 5 | **GLN**; 4* | DAY; 29* | DAR; 36 | KAN; 11 | BRI; 2 | TEX; 32 | TAL; 1 | ROV; 20* | LVS; 21 | HOM; 14 | MAR; 10 | PHO; 28 | 4th | 5009 | |
| 2023 | Hendrick Motorsports | 9 | Chevy | DAY; 38 | CAL; 2 | LVS | PHO | ATL | COA | RCH | BRD | MAR; 10 | TAL; 12 | DOV; 11 | KAN; 7 | DAR; 3 | CLT; 34 | GTW | SON; 5 | NSH; 4 | CSC; 3 | ATL; 13 | NHA; 12 | POC; 10 | RCH; 13 | MCH; 36 | IRC; 2 | GLN; 32 | DAY; 4 | DAR; 8 | KAN; 6 | BRI; 7 | TEX; 11 | TAL; 7 | ROV; 9 | LVS; 32 | HOM; 15 | MAR; 17 | PHO; 16 | 17th | 820 | |
| 2024 | Hendrick Motorsports | 9 | Chevy | DAY; 14 | ATL; 15 | LVS; 12 | PHO; 19 | BRI; 8 | COA; 16 | RCH; 5 | MAR; 3 | TEX; 1 | TAL; 15 | DOV; 5 | KAN; 3 | DAR; 12 | CLT; 7 | GTW; 13 | SON; 4 | IOW; 3 | NHA; 18 | NSH; 18 | CSC; 21 | POC; 9 | IND; 10 | RCH; 9 | MCH; 15 | DAY; 36 | DAR; 11 | ATL; 8 | GLN; 19 | BRI; 2 | KAN; 9 | TAL; 29 | ROV; 5 | LVS; 33 | HOM; 5 | MAR; 2 | PHO; 8 | 7th | 2342 | |
| 2025 | Hendrick Motorsports | 9 | Chevy | DAY; 15 | ATL; 20 | COA; 4 | PHO; 10 | LVS; 10 | HOM; 18 | MAR; 4 | DAR; 8 | BRI; 15 | TAL; 5 | TEX; 16 | KAN; 15 | CLT; 6 | NSH; 15 | MCH; 15 | MXC; 3 | POC; 5 | ATL; 1 | CSC; 16 | SON; 3 | DOV; 6* | IND; 13 | IOW; 14 | GLN; 26 | RCH; 38 | DAY; 10 | DAR; 17 | GTW; 3 | BRI; 38 | NHA; 5 | KAN; 1 | ROV; 8 | LVS; 18 | TAL; 40 | MAR; 3 | PHO; 10 | 8th | 2310 | |
| 2026 | Hendrick Motorsports | 9 | Chevy | DAY; 4 | ATL; 11 | COA; 7 | PHO; 23 | LVS; 2 | DAR; 15 | MAR; 1 | BRI; 22 | KAN; 8 | TAL; 4 | TEX; 1* | GLN; 24 | CLT; 37 | NSH; 7 | MCH; 32* | POC; 11 | COR; 12 | SON; 17 | CHI; 11 | ATL; 13 | NWS; 17 | IND; 37 | IOW; 15 | RCH; 5 | NHA; 25 | DAY; 23 | DAR; 14 | GTW; 31 | BRI; 23 | KAN; 8 | LVS; 7 | CLT; 12 | PHO; 3 | TAL; 36 | MAR; 2 | HOM; 22 | 12th | 2287 | |

===== Daytona 500 =====
| Year | Team | Manufacturer | Start | Finish |
|---|---|---|---|---|
| 2016 | Hendrick Motorsports | Chevrolet | **1** | 37 |
| 2017 | Hendrick Motorsports | Chevrolet | **1** | 14 |
| 2018 | Hendrick Motorsports | Chevrolet | 4 | 33 |
| 2019 | Hendrick Motorsports | Chevrolet | 18 | 17 |
| 2020 | Hendrick Motorsports | Chevrolet | 25 | 17 |
| 2021 | Hendrick Motorsports | Chevrolet | 12 | 2 |
| 2022 | Hendrick Motorsports | Chevrolet | 11 | 10 |
| 2023 | Hendrick Motorsports | Chevrolet | 8 | 38 |
| 2024 | Hendrick Motorsports | Chevrolet | 5 | 14 |
| 2025 | Hendrick Motorsports | Chevrolet | 17 | 15 |
| 2026 | Hendrick Motorsports | Chevrolet | 4 | 4 |

==== O'Reilly Auto Parts Series ====
NASCAR O'Reilly Auto Parts Series results
| Year | Team | No. | Make | 1 | 2 | 3 | 4 | 5 | 6 | 7 | 8 | 9 | 10 | 11 | 12 | 13 | 14 | 15 | 16 | 17 | 18 | 19 | 20 | 21 | 22 | 23 | 24 | 25 | 26 | 27 | 28 | 29 | 30 | 31 | 32 | 33 | NOAPSC | Pts | Ref |
|---|---|---|---|---|---|---|---|---|---|---|---|---|---|---|---|---|---|---|---|---|---|---|---|---|---|---|---|---|---|---|---|---|---|---|---|---|---|---|---|
| 2014 | JR Motorsports | 9 | Chevy | DAY; 15 | PHO; 9 | LVS; 5 | BRI; 9 | CAL; 6 | TEX; 1 | DAR; 1 | RCH; 2 | TAL; 19 | IOW; 4 | CLT; 37 | DOV; 5 | MCH; 6 | ROA; 4 | KEN; 12 | DAY; 20 | NHA; 8 | CHI; 1* | IND; 12 | IOW; 8 | GLN; 6 | MOH; 4 | BRI; 3 | **ATL**; 5 | RCH; 2 | CHI; 10 | KEN; 4 | DOV; 3 | KAN; 10 | **CLT**; 8* | TEX; 4 | PHO; 5 | HOM; 17 | 1st | 1213 | |
| 2015 | JR Motorsports | 9 | Chevy | DAY; 28 | ATL; 5 | LVS; 5 | PHO; 7 | CAL; 4 | TEX; 8 | BRI; 6 | RCH; 5 | TAL; 37 | IOW; 2* | CLT; 8 | DOV; 6 | MCH; 2 | CHI; 14 | DAY; 3 | KEN; 13 | NHA; 9 | IND; 10 | IOW; 9 | GLN; 7 | MOH; 5 | BRI; 7 | ROA; 4* | DAR; 24 | RCH; 1* | CHI; 14 | KEN; 4 | DOV; 7 | CLT; 9 | KAN; 7 | TEX; 8 | PHO; 7 | HOM; 8 | 2nd | 1175 | |
| 2016 | JR Motorsports | 88 | Chevy | DAY; 1 | ATL | LVS; 4 | PHO; 5 | CAL | | | | TAL; 9 | DOV | CLT | POC | MCH | IOW | DAY; 9 | KEN | NHA | IND | IOW | GLN | MOH | BRI | ROA | DAR | RCH | CHI | KEN | DOV | CLT | KAN | TEX | PHO | HOM | 90th | 0^{1} | |
| 2016 | JR Motorsports | 5 | Chevy | | | | | | TEX; 4 | BRI | RCH | | | | | | | | | | | | | | | | | | | | | | | | | | 90th | 0^{1} | |
| 2018 | JR Motorsports | 88 | Chevy | DAY; 12 | ATL | LVS | PHO | CAL | TEX | BRI | RCH | TAL | DOV | | | | | | | | | | | | | | | | | | | | | | | | 90th | 0^{1} | |
| 2018 | GMS Racing | 23 | Chevy | | | | | | | | | | | CLT; 37 | POC; 2 | MCH | IOW | CHI; 10 | DAY; 29 | KEN | NHA | IOW | GLN | MOH | BRI; 8 | ROA | DAR; 6 | IND; 4 | LVS | RCH | ROV | DOV | KAN | TEX | PHO | HOM | 90th | 0^{1} | |
| 2019 | JR Motorsports | 8 | Chevy | DAY; 10 | ATL | LVS | PHO | CAL | TEX | BRI | RCH | TAL | DOV | CLT | POC | MCH | IOW | CHI | DAY | KEN | NHA | IOW | GLN | MOH | BRI | ROA | DAR | IND | LVS | RCH | ROV | DOV | KAN | TEX | PHO | HOM | 90th | 0^{1} | |
| 2021 | JR Motorsports | 1 | Chevy | DAY | DRC | HOM | LVS | PHO | ATL | MAR | TAL | DAR | DOV | COA | CLT | MOH | TEX | NSH | POC | ROA | ATL | NHA | GLN | IRC; 4 | MCH | DAY | DAR | RCH | BRI | LVS | TAL | ROV | TEX | KAN | MAR | PHO | 78th | 0^{1} | |
| 2022 | JR Motorsports | 88 | Chevy | DAY | CAL | LVS | PHO | ATL | COA | RCH | MAR | TAL | DOV | DAR; DNQ | TEX | CLT | PIR | NSH | ROA | ATL | NHA | POC | IRC | MCH | GLN | DAY | DAR | KAN | BRI | TEX | TAL | ROV | LVS | HOM | MAR | PHO | N/A | 0^{1} | |
| 2023 | Hendrick Motorsports | 17 | Chevy | DAY | CAL | LVS | PHO | ATL | COA | RCH | MAR | TAL | DOV | DAR | CLT | PIR | SON | NSH | CSC | ATL | NHA | POC; 3 | ROA | MCH | IRC | GLN | DAY | DAR | KAN | BRI | TEX | ROV | LVS | HOM | MAR | PHO | 79th | 0^{1} | |
| 2024 | Hendrick Motorsports | 17 | Chevy | DAY | ATL | LVS | PHO | COA | RCH | MAR | TEX | TAL | DOV | DAR | CLT; 1 | PIR | SON | IOW | NHA | NSH | CSC | POC | IND | MCH | DAY | DAR; 4 | ATL | GLN | BRI | KAN | TAL | ROV | LVS | HOM | MAR | PHO | 80th | 0^{1} | |
| 2025 | Hendrick Motorsports | 17 | Chevy | DAY | ATL | COA | PHO | LVS | HOM | MAR | DAR; 2 | BRI | CAR | TAL | TEX | CLT | NSH | MXC | **POC**; 4* | ATL | CSC | SON | DOV | IND | IOW | GLN | DAY | PIR | GTW | BRI | KAN | ROV | LVS | TAL | MAR | PHO | 80th | 0^{1} | |
| 2026 | JR Motorsports | 88 | Chevy | DAY | ATL | COA | PHO | LVS | DAR | MAR | CAR | BRI | KAN | TAL | TEX | GLN | DOV | CLT | NSH | POC | COR | SON | CHI; 2* | ATL | IND; 4 | IOW | DAY | DAR | GTW | BRI | LVS | CLT | PHO | TAL | MAR | HOM | 73rd | 0^{1} | |

==== Craftsman Truck Series ====
NASCAR Craftsman Truck Series results
| Year | Team | No. | Make | 1 | 2 | 3 | 4 | 5 | 6 | 7 | 8 | 9 | 10 | 11 | 12 | 13 | 14 | 15 | 16 | 17 | 18 | 19 | 20 | 21 | 22 | 23 | 24 | 25 | NCTC | Pts | Ref |
|---|---|---|---|---|---|---|---|---|---|---|---|---|---|---|---|---|---|---|---|---|---|---|---|---|---|---|---|---|---|---|---|
| 2013 | Hendrick Motorsports | 94 | Chevy | DAY | MAR; 6 | CAR; 5 | KAN | CLT | DOV; 4 | TEX | KEN | IOW; 5 | ELD | POC | MCH | **BRI**; 5 | MSP; 1 | IOW; 31 | CHI | LVS | TAL | MAR; 20 | TEX | PHO; 10 | HOM | | | | 22nd | 315 | |
| 2016 | Contreras Motorsports | 71 | Chevy | DAY | ATL | MAR | KAN | DOV | CLT | TEX | IOW | GTW | KEN | ELD | POC | BRI | MCH | MSP | CHI | NHA | LVS | TAL | **MAR**; 2* | TEX | PHO | HOM | | | 83rd | 0^{1} | |
| 2017 | GMS Racing | 23 | Chevy | DAY | ATL; 5 | **MAR**; 1 | KAN | CLT | DOV | TEX | GTW | IOW | KEN | ELD | POC | MCH | BRI | MSP | CHI | NHA | LVS | TAL | MAR | TEX | PHO | HOM | | | 76th | 0^{1} | |
| 2020 | GMS Racing | 24 | Chevy | DAY | LVS | CLT; 1* | ATL; 20 | HOM; 4 | POC | KEN | TEX | KAN | KAN | MCH | DRC | DOV | GTW | DAR | RCH | BRI | LVS | TAL | KAN | TEX | MAR | PHO | | | 79th | 0^{1} | |
| 2021 | GMS Racing | 24 | Chevy | DAY | DRC | LVS | ATL | BRD | RCH | KAN | DAR | COA | CLT | TEX; 2 | NSH | POC | KNX | GLN | GTW | DAR | BRI | LVS | TAL | MAR | PHO | | | | 97th | 0^{1} | |
| 2022 | Spire Motorsports | 7 | Chevy | DAY | LVS | ATL | COA | MAR | BRD; 7 | DAR | KAN | TEX | CLT | GTW | SON | KNX | NSH | MOH | POC | IRP | RCH | KAN | BRI | TAL | HOM | PHO | | | 92nd | 0^{1} | |
| 2023 | McAnally–Hilgemann Racing | 35 | Chevy | DAY; 10 | LVS | ATL | COA | TEX | BRD | MAR | KAN | DAR | NWS | CLT | GTW | NSH | MOH | POC | RCH | IRP | MLW | KAN | BRI | TAL | HOM | PHO | | | 98th | 0^{1} | |
| 2026 | Spire Motorsports | 7 | Chevy | DAY | ATL | STP | DAR | ROC | BRI | TEX | GLN | DOV | CLT | NSH | MCH | COR | LRP | NWS; 7 | IRP | RCH | NHA | BRI | KAN | CLT | PHO | TAL | MAR | HOM | 108th | 0^{1} | |

^{*} Season still in progress
^{1} Ineligible for series points

=== ARCA Racing Series ===
(key) (Bold – Pole position awarded by qualifying time. Italics – Pole position earned by points standings or practice time. * – Most laps led.)

ARCA Racing Series results
| Year | Team | No. | Make | 1 | 2 | 3 | 4 | 5 | 6 | 7 | 8 | 9 | 10 | 11 | 12 | 13 | 14 | 15 | 16 | 17 | 18 | 19 | 20 | 21 | ARSC | Pts | Ref |
|---|---|---|---|---|---|---|---|---|---|---|---|---|---|---|---|---|---|---|---|---|---|---|---|---|---|---|---|
| 2012 | Hendrick Motorsports | 9 | Chevy | DAY | MOB; 10 | SLM; 4 | TAL | TOL | ELK | POC | MCH | WIN | NJE; 2 | IOW | CHI | IRP | POC | BLN; 7 | ISF | MAD; 8 | **SLM**; 3 | DSF | KAN | | 25th | 1260 | |
| 2013 | Hendrick Motorsports | 9 | Chevy | DAY | MOB | SLM | TAL | TOL | ELK | POC; 1 | MCH | ROA; 4 | WIN | CHI | NJE; 3* | POC; 9 | BLN | ISF | MAD | DSF | IOW | SLM | KEN; 27 | KAN | 28th | 975 | |
| 2014 | Hendrick Motorsports | 9 | Chevy | DAY; 9 | MOB | SLM | TAL | TOL | NJE | POC | MCH | ELK | WIN | CHI | IRP | POC | BLN | ISF | MAD | DSF | SLM | KEN | KAN | | 86th | 185 | |

==== K&N Pro Series East ====
NASCAR K&N Pro Series East results
| Year | Team | No. | Make | 1 | 2 | 3 | 4 | 5 | 6 | 7 | 8 | 9 | 10 | 11 | 12 | 13 | 14 | NKNPSEC | Pts | Ref |
|---|---|---|---|---|---|---|---|---|---|---|---|---|---|---|---|---|---|---|---|---|
| 2011 | Hendrick Motorsports | 9 | Chevy | GRE; 4 | SBO; 22 | RCH; 24 | IOW; 7 | BGS; 18 | JFC; 22 | LGY; 5 | NHA; 10 | COL; 6 | GRE; 3 | NHA; 11 | DOV; 29 | | | 9th | 1510 | |
| 2012 | Hendrick Motorsports | 9 | Chevy | BRI; 10 | GRE; 6 | RCH; 2 | IOW; 1 | BGS; 6 | JFC; 14 | **LGY**; 3 | CNB; 15 | COL; 15 | IOW; 4 | NHA; 5 | DOV; 27 | GRE; 2 | CAR; 12 | 4th | 500 | |

==== K&N Pro Series West ====
NASCAR K&N Pro Series West results
| Year | Team | No. | Make | 1 | 2 | 3 | 4 | 5 | 6 | 7 | 8 | 9 | 10 | 11 | 12 | 13 | 14 | 15 | NKNPSWC | Pts | Ref |
|---|---|---|---|---|---|---|---|---|---|---|---|---|---|---|---|---|---|---|---|---|---|
| 2011 | Hendrick Motorsports | 94 | Chevy | PHO | AAS | MMP | IOW | LVS | SON | IRW | EVG | PIR | CNS | MRP | SPO | AAS | PHO; 3 | | 67th | 165 | |
| 2012 | Hendrick Motorsports | 94 | Chevy | PHO; 17 | LHC | MMP | S99 | IOW | BIR | LVS | SON | EVG | CNS | IOW | PIR | SMP | AAS | PHO; 4 | 38th | 67 | |
| 2016 | HScott Motorsports | 24 | Chevy | IRW | KCR | TUS | OSS | CNS | **SON**; 1 | SLS | IOW | EVG | DCS | MMP | MMP | MER | AAS | | 38th | 47 | |

=== CARS Late Model Stock Car Tour ===
(key) (Bold – Pole position awarded by qualifying time. Italics – Pole position earned by points standings or practice time. * – Most laps led. ** – All laps led.)

CARS Late Model Stock Car Tour results
| Year | Team | No. | Make | 1 | 2 | 3 | 4 | 5 | 6 | 7 | 8 | 9 | 10 | 11 | 12 | 13 | 14 | CLMSCTC | Pts | Ref |
|---|---|---|---|---|---|---|---|---|---|---|---|---|---|---|---|---|---|---|---|---|
| 2026 | JR Motorsports | 8E | Chevy | SNM | WCS | NSV | CRW | ACE | LGY | DOM | NWS; 14 | HCY | AND | FLC | TCM | NPS | SBO | 64th | 28 | |

=== CARS Super Late Model Tour ===
(key)

CARS Super Late Model Tour results
| Year | Team | No. | Make | 1 | 2 | 3 | 4 | 5 | 6 | 7 | 8 | 9 | 10 | CSLMTC | Pts | Ref |
|---|---|---|---|---|---|---|---|---|---|---|---|---|---|---|---|---|
| 2015 | Chase Elliott | 9E | Chevy | SNM | ROU | HCY; 2 | SNM | TCM | MMS | ROU | CON | MYB | HCY | 41st | 31 | |

=== CARS Pro Late Model Tour ===
(key)

CARS Pro Late Model Tour results
| Year | Team | No. | Make | 1 | 2 | 3 | 4 | 5 | 6 | 7 | 8 | 9 | 10 | 11 | CPLMTC | Pts | Ref |
|---|---|---|---|---|---|---|---|---|---|---|---|---|---|---|---|---|---|
| 2026 | N/A | 9 | Chevy | SNM | NSV | CRW | ACE | NWS; 14 | HCY | AND | FLC | TCM | NPS | SBO | 56th | 28 | |

=== ASA STARS National Tour ===
(key) (Bold – Pole position awarded by qualifying time. Italics – Pole position earned by points standings or practice time. * – Most laps led. ** – All laps led.)

ASA STARS National Tour results
| Year | Team | No. | Make | 1 | 2 | 3 | 4 | 5 | 6 | 7 | 8 | 9 | 10 | 11 | 12 | ASNTC | Pts | Ref |
|---|---|---|---|---|---|---|---|---|---|---|---|---|---|---|---|---|---|---|
| 2023 | Chase Elliott Motorsports | 9 | Chevy | FIF | MAD | NWS; 3 | HCY; 6 | MLW | AND | WIR | TOL | WIN | NSV | | | 27th | 132 | |
| 2024 | Marcus Barela | 9 | Chevy | NSM; 6 | FIF | HCY; 21 | MAD | MLW | AND | OWO | TOL | WIN | NSV | | | 28th | 100 | |
| 2025 | Marcus Barela | 9E | Chevy | NSM | FIF | DOM | HCY; 2 | NPS | MAD | SLG | AND | OWO | TOL | WIN | NSV | 41st | 69 | |
| 2026 | Marcus Barela | 9E | Chevy | NSM | FIF | HCY; Wth | SLG | MAD | NPS | OWO | TRI | WIN | NSV | NSM | | -* | -* | |

=== Complete WeatherTech SportsCar Championship results ===
(key) (Races in bold indicate pole position; races in italics indicate fastest lap)

| Year | Entrant | Class | Make | Engine | 1 | 2 | 3 | 4 | 5 | 6 | 7 | 8 | 9 | 10 | Rank | Points |
|---|---|---|---|---|---|---|---|---|---|---|---|---|---|---|---|---|
| 2021 | Whelen Engineering Racing | DPi | Cadillac DPi-V.R | Cadillac 5.5 L V8 | **DAY**; 6 | SEB | MDO | DET | WGL | WGL | ELK | LGA | LBH | PET | 19th | 285 |

==== 24 Hours of Daytona results ====
| Year | Team | Co-drivers | Car | Class | Laps | Pos. | Class Pos. |
|---|---|---|---|---|---|---|---|
| 2021 | (United States) Whelen Engineering Racing | (United Kingdom) Mike Conway (Brazil) Pipo Derani (Brazil) Felipe Nasr | Cadillac DPi-V.R | DPi | 783 | 8th | 6th |

=== Superstar Racing Experience ===
(key) * – Most laps led. ^{1} – Heat 1 winner.^{2} – Heat 2 winner.

Superstar Racing Experience results
| Year | No. | 1 | 2 | 3 | 4 | 5 | 6 | SRXC | Pts |
|---|---|---|---|---|---|---|---|---|---|
| 2021 | 94 | STA | KNX | ELD | IRP | SLG | NSV; 1 | 14th | 41 |
| 2022 | 9 | FIF | SBO | STA | NSV | I-55 | SHA; 1^{2} | 13th | 43 |

== See also ==
- List of NASCAR O'Reilly Auto Parts Series champions
- List of people from Georgia (U.S. state)

Sporting positions
| Preceded by Brett Moffitt | NASCAR Cup Series Rookie of the Year; 2016 | Succeeded by Erik Jones |
| Preceded by Kyle Busch | NASCAR Cup Series Champion; 2020 | Succeeded by Kyle Larson |
| Preceded by Kyle Larson | NASCAR Nationwide Series Rookie of the Year; 2014 | Succeeded by Daniel Suárez |
| Preceded by Austin Dillon | NASCAR Nationwide Series Champion; 2014 | Succeeded by Chris Buescher |
| Preceded by Johanna Long | Sunoco Gulf Coast Championship Series; 2010 | Succeeded by Bubba Pollard |
Achievements
| Preceded by Kyle Larson | NASCAR All-Star Race Winner; 2020 | Succeeded by Kyle Larson |
| Preceded by Kyle Busch | Winchester 400 Winner; 2010 | Succeeded by Boris Jurkovic |
| Preceded by Johanna Long | Snowball Derby Winner; 2011 | Succeeded by Erik Jones |
| Preceded by Chris Wimmer | World Crown 300 Winner; 2012 | Succeeded by Preston Peltier |
| Preceded by Ross Kenseth | All American 400 Winner; 2013 | Succeeded by John Hunter Nemechek |
| Preceded by John Hunter Nemechek | Snowball Derby Winner; 2015 | Succeeded by Christian Eckes |
