= Brian Ross (racing driver) =

American racing driver (born 1962)

- Born: January 14, 1962 (age 64); Plymouth, Indiana, U.S.
- Achievements: 1999 and 2001 CRA Kendall Late Model Series Champion; 2012 Plymouth Speedway Track Champion; 2002 USAR Hooters Pro Cup Northern Division Champion; 1999 Winchester 400 Winner
- Awards: 2000 ARCA Rookie of the Year 2002 USAR Hooters Pro Cup Rookie of the Year

NASCAR O'Reilly Auto Parts Series career
- 0 races run over 1 year
Wins	Top tens	Poles
0	0	0

NASCAR FedEx Freight Truck Series career
- 2 races run over 1 year
- Best finish: 75th (2002)
- First race: 2002 Power Stroke Diesel 200 (IRP)
- Last race: 2002 Richmond Is For Lovers 200 (Richmond)
Wins	Top tens	Poles
0	0	0
- Statistics up to date as of August 17, 2014.

Brian Ross (born January 14, 1962) is an American racecar driver. He won Rookie of the Year honors in the Automobile Racing Club of America in 2000 and won the CRA Kendall Late Model Series in 1999 and 2001. He has two career starts in the NASCAR Craftsman Truck Series starts, both in 2002. In 2012, Brian Ross won his first ever track championship at Plymouth Speedway.

Ross was also the USAR Hooters Pro Cup Series rookie of the year and northern division champion in 2002. That year, he earned five wins. Ross was the 1999 winner of the annual Winchester 400.

== Motorsports career results ==
=== NASCAR ===
(key) (Bold – Pole position awarded by qualifying time. Italics – Pole position earned by points standings or practice time. * – Most laps led.)

==== Busch Series ====
NASCAR Busch Series results
Year	Team	No.	Make	1	2	3	4	5	6	7	8	9	10	11	12	13	14	15	16	17	18	19	20	21	22	23	24	25	26	27	28	29	30	31	32	33	34	NBSC	Pts	Ref
2002	Jules Bickel	62	Ford	DAY	CAR	LVS	DAR	BRI	TEX	NSH	TAL	CAL	RCH	NHA	NZH	CLT	DOV	NSH	KEN	MLW; DNQ	DAY	CHI	GTY	PPR	IRP	MCH; DNQ	BRI	DAR	RCH	DOV	KAN	CLT	MEM	ATL	CAR	PHO	HOM	NA	-	

==== Craftsman Truck Series ====
NASCAR Craftsman Truck Series results
Year	Team	No.	Make	1	2	3	4	5	6	7	8	9	10	11	12	13	14	15	16	17	18	19	20	21	22	NCTC	Pts	Ref
2002	James Bailey	70	Ford	DAY	DAR	MAR	GTY	PPR	DOV	TEX	MEM	MLW	KAN	KEN	NHA	MCH	IRP; 26	NSH	RCH; 31	TEX	SBO	LVS	CAL	PHO	HOM	75th	155	

Sporting positions
Preceded by Brian Rielvey	CRA Super Series Champion; 1999	Succeeded by Scott Hantz
Preceded by Scott Hantz	CRA Super Series Champion; 2001	Succeeded by Joel Kauffman
