= Stephen Nasse =

American stock car racing driver

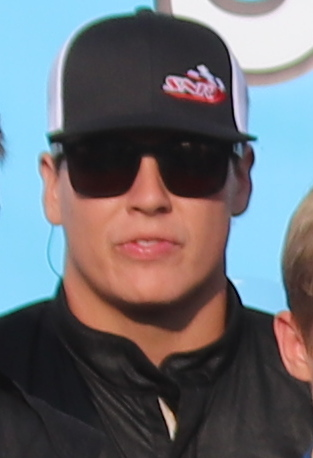
- Nasse in 2019
- Born: May 5, 1995 (age 31); Pinellas Park, Florida, U.S.
- Achievements: 2017, 2020 Southern Super Series Champion; 2018 World Series of Asphalt Super Late Model Champion; 2011, 2013 Red Eye 100 Winner; 2016 Hart to Heart 100 Winner; 2019, 2022 Winchester 400 Winner; 2022, 2026 All American 400 Winner; 2019 U.S. Short Track Nationals Super Late Model 100 Winner; 2020 Clyde Hart Memorial Winner; 2021 Orange Blossom 100 Winner; 2024 Snowflake 100 Winner; 2025 Snowball Derby Winner

ARCA Menards Series East career
- 3 races run over 2 years
- Best finish: 32nd (2020)
- First race: 2012 Blue Ox 100 (Richmond)
- Last race: 2020 Skip's Western Outfitters 175 (New Smyrna)
| Wins | Top tens | Poles |
|---|---|---|
| 0 | 1 | 0 |
- Statistics up to date as of March 7, 2023.

Stephen Nasse (born May 5, 1995) is an American professional stock car racing driver. He last competed part-time in the ARCA Menards Series East, driving the No. 09 Toyota for Jett Motorsports. He also competes in various super late model events. He is nicknamed ”Nasty Nasse” due to his short tempered nature and on track antics.

== Racing career ==
A third-generation racer, Nasse started his racing career in the go-kart ranks at age four. He won a national karting championship. He grew up watching racing at his hometown track Sunshine (now Showtime) Speedway. As a 13-year-old, he moved up to Florida's FasTrucks. Nasse had his first late model win as a 14-year-old in the 2009 New Smyrna Speedway's World Series of Asphalt Racing, and moved up to full-time late model racing in 2010. He and his family team eventually made two NASCAR K&N Pro Series East starts in 2012. Nasse won the Red Eye 100 late model race in 2012 and 2013.

Nasse was running in the Pro Cup Series in 2013 when he caught pneumonia, keeping him off of the track for two-plus months. After he recovered, Nasse ran in the Pro Cup Series' successor, the CARS Super Late Model Tour, teaming with DLP Motorsports.

In 2015, Nasse spun leader Anderson Bowen on the first lap of the Rattler 250 at South Alabama Speedway. Nasse took responsibility for the incident but called it an accident, claiming that Bowen took an irregular line into corner entry, braking earlier than Nasse was expecting. During a Pro All Stars Series South contest at South Boston Speedway, Nasse was spun from the lead by Brandon Setzer and retired from the race. 2016 saw Nasse take checkered flags in various events, including the Baby Rattler 125 and races sanctioned by the Bright House Challenge Series and the CARS Tour. Multiple run-ins with Dalton Sargeant led to a brief rivalry between the two. In the 2016 Snowball Derby, Nasse wrecked William Byron under caution in retaliation for an on-track incident; Nasse later called out Byron, Johanna Long and Todd Gilliland for moving up by writing checks and not moving up by talent.

Nasse won the 2017 Southern Super Series championship and also claimed a victory in the CARS Super Late Model Tour season finale. The SSS championship came after Nasse started the season unsure of whether he would run the full season, as he had never done so in the past.

Nasse switched teams from DLP Motorsports to Jett Motorsports in 2018 and followed the championship up with an early 2018 championship in the World Series of Asphalt. In April 2018, Nasse punched rival Donnie Wilson while Wilson was still in his car after an on-track incident at Five Flags Speedway. Nasse later controlled the last third of the race to win the Mobile 300 at Mobile International Speedway. At the Snowball Derby in December, Nasse wrapped his car in a Fortnite-style winter paint scheme. He also spent $5000 to hire what he thought was a Roush Fenway Racing development pit crew for the race but had myriad problems with the crew during the day, losing spots on pit road and eventually returning to the track twice with a loose wheel, ending his day in a crash. Nasse, infuriated by the smirks he saw on the rented pit crew's faces, charged the crew after exiting his car over an estimated $40,000 loss.

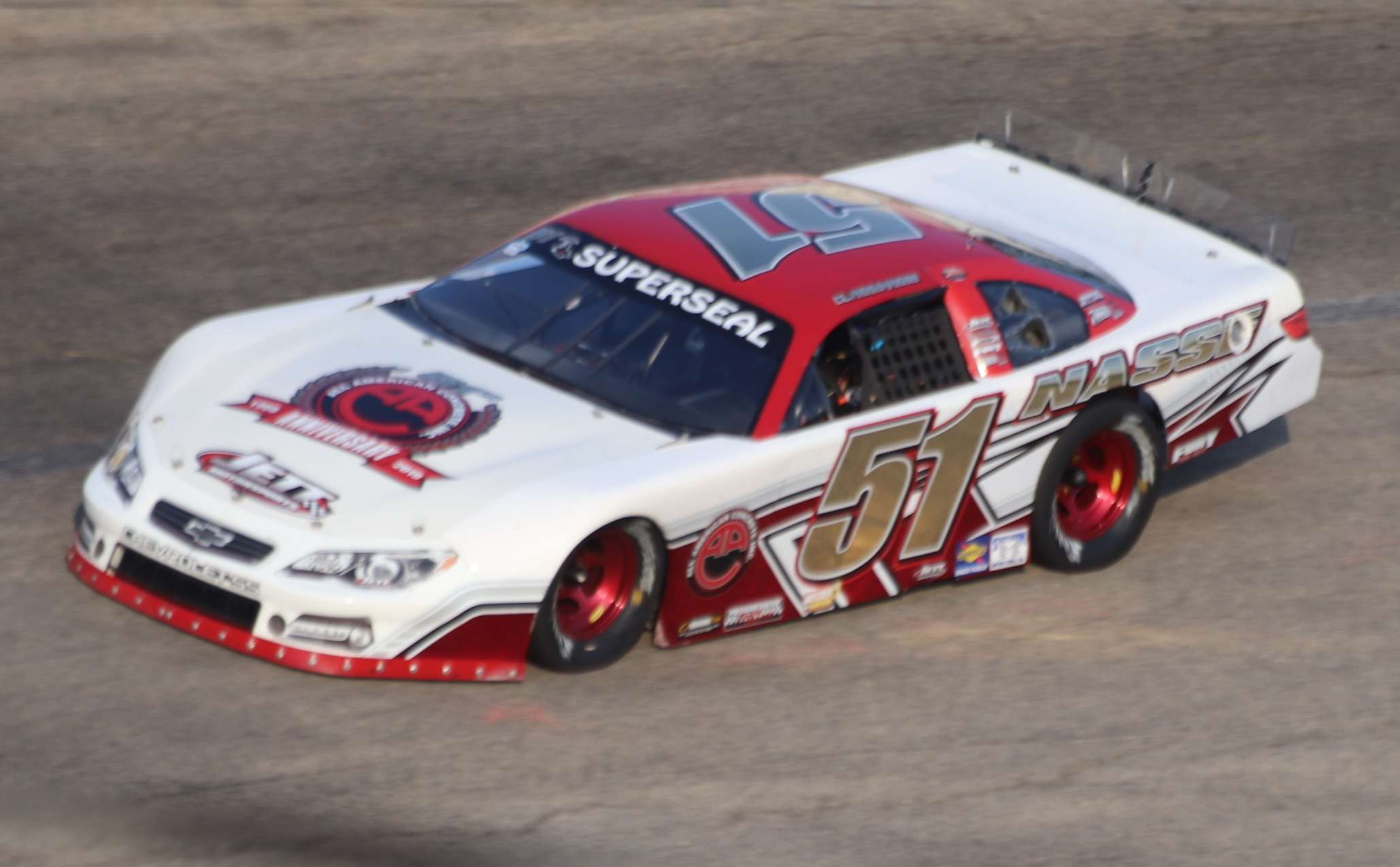
Nasse's No. 51 super late model in 2019

Nasse switched to a freelance schedule in 2019 instead of running for any one particular points championship. He won the super late model portion of Short Track Nationals at Bristol Motor Speedway in May, prevailing over Casey Roderick. At Winchester Speedway, Nasse led all but eight laps en route to a Winchester 400 win. After leading laps in the All American 400 at Fairgrounds Speedway, brake issues dropped Nasse from contention. He also finished first in the Snowball Derby in December, but was stripped of the win during post-race technical inspection for having titanium piston caps in the braking system, something that was explicitly disallowed in the rulebook. Nasse claimed that his former brake supplier, PFC Brakes, told technical inspectors to check the brakes, and the claim was not immediately refuted by PFC employees, although the company later released a statement denying involvement. Nasse also blasted PFC for playing favorites within their customer base.

Nasse at New Smyrna Speedway in 2020

To start the 2020 season, Nasse debuted a new Rowdy Manufacturing super late model chassis, switching from a Fury Race Cars-built entry. After winning the pro late model portion of SpeedFest in January, he spun Bubba Pollard with fifteen laps to go in the super late model portion of the event. Pollard later dumped Nasse, leading to an exchange of words between the two culminating in Nasse calling Pollard "the biggest crybaby in this pit area." In February, Nasse was asked by his team owner to run the ARCA Menards Series East race at New Smyrna Speedway in an aim to get into the driver development program arena. In his first race at Five Flags since the Snowball, Nasse scored a win at a Blizzard Series race there. After a potential late model stock car debut at the ValleyStar Credit Union 300 was cancelled, he returned to the Short Track Nationals. Nasse also won two Southern Super Series races, claiming a $5,000 bonus for his win at Crisp Motorsports Park in August.

=== Other racing ===
Nasse has said that he originally aspired to be a high-level NASCAR driver, but decided against it due to what he called "boring racing, empty stands and vanilla personalities". As an alternative, Nasse said that he would like to run in a World of Outlaws Late Model with personalities like Scott Bloomquist.

== Personal life ==
When not racing, Nasse works as a foundation builder for residential construction. He is a casual iRacing player. Other hobbies of his include bass fishing in his hometown, and spending time with his friends including Cornbread.

== Motorsports career results ==
=== Stock car career summary ===
| Season | Series | Team | Races | Wins | Top 5 | Top 10 | Points | Position |
|---|---|---|---|---|---|---|---|---|
| 2012 | NASCAR K&N Pro Series East | DLP Motorsports | 2 | 0 | 0 | 0 | 46 | 48th |
| 2015 | CARS Super Late Model Tour | Jeff Nasse | 7 | 0 | 1 | 2 | 153 | 10th |
| 2016 | CARS Super Late Model Tour | Jeff Nasse | 3 | 1 | 1 | 1 | 68 | 23rd |
| 2017 | CARS Super Late Model Tour | Jeff Nasse | 4 | 1 | 2 | 2 | 70 | 18th |
| 2018 | CARS Super Late Model Tour | Jeff Nasse | 3 | 0 | 1 | 2 | 53 | 23rd |
| 2019 | CARS Super Late Model Tour | Jeff Nasse | 5 | 1 | 4 | 4 | 142 | 6th |
| 2020 | CARS Super Late Model Tour | Jeff Nasse | 4 | 0 | 3 | 3 | 105 | 10th |
| 2020 | ARCA Menards Series East | Jett Motorsports | 1 | 0 | 1 | 1 | 38 | 32nd |
| 2021 | CARS Super Late Model Tour | Jeff Nasse | 4 | 1 | 4 | 4 | 62 | 10th |
| 2021 | CARS Late Model Stock Car Tour | Jamie Yelton | 2 | 0 | 1 | 2 | 52 | 23rd |
| 2023 | ASA STARS National Tour | Stephen Nasse Racing | 6 | 0 | 1 | 3 | 265 | 6th |
| 2023 | CARS Late Model Stock Car Tour | Jamie Yelton | 1 | 0 | 1 | 1 | 28 | 38th |
| 2024 | ASA STARS National Tour | Stephen Nasse Racing | 6 | 0 | 2 | 4 | 294 | 10th |
| 2025 | ASA STARS National Tour | Stephen Nasse Racing | 10 | 0 | 7 | 8 | 568 | 5th |
| 2026 | ASA STARS National Tour | Stephen Nasse Racing | 9 | 1 | 3 | 6 | | |

=== ARCA Menards Series East ===
(key) (Bold – Pole position awarded by qualifying time. Italics – Pole position earned by points standings or practice time. * – Most laps led.)

ARCA Menards Series East results
| Year | Team | No. | Make | 1 | 2 | 3 | 4 | 5 | 6 | 7 | 8 | 9 | 10 | 11 | 12 | 13 | 14 | AMSEC | Pts | Ref |
|---|---|---|---|---|---|---|---|---|---|---|---|---|---|---|---|---|---|---|---|---|
| 2012 | DLP Motorsports | 51 | Toyota | BRI | GRE | RCH; 20 | IOW | BGS | JFC; 22 | LGY | CNB | COL | IOW | NHA | DOV | GRE | CAR | 48th | 46 | |
| 2020 | Jett Motorsports | 09 | Toyota | NSM; 6 | TOL | DOV | TOL | BRI | FIF | | | | | | | | | 32nd | 38 | |

=== CARS Late Model Stock Car Tour ===
(key) (Bold – Pole position awarded by qualifying time. Italics – Pole position earned by points standings or practice time. * – Most laps led. ** – All laps led.)

CARS Late Model Stock Car Tour results
| Year | Team | No. | Make | 1 | 2 | 3 | 4 | 5 | 6 | 7 | 8 | 9 | 10 | 11 | 12 | 13 | 14 | 15 | 16 | CLMSCTC | Pts | Ref |
|---|---|---|---|---|---|---|---|---|---|---|---|---|---|---|---|---|---|---|---|---|---|---|
| 2021 | Jamie Yelton | 51 | Chevy | DIL | HCY | OCS; 5 | ACE | CRW | LGY | DOM | HCY | MMS | TCM; 9 | FLC | WKS | SBO | | | | 23rd | 52 | |
| 2023 | Jamie Yelton | 51 | Chevy | SNM | FLC | HCY | ACE | NWS | LGY | DOM | CRW | HCY | ACE | TCM | WKS | AAS | SBO | TCM; 5 | CRW | 38th | 28 | |

=== CARS Super Late Model Tour ===
(key)

CARS Super Late Model Tour results
| Year | Team | No. | Make | 1 | 2 | 3 | 4 | 5 | 6 | 7 | 8 | 9 | 10 | 11 | 12 | 13 | CSLMTC | Pts | Ref |
|---|---|---|---|---|---|---|---|---|---|---|---|---|---|---|---|---|---|---|---|
| 2015 | Jeff Nasse | 51N | Ford | SNM; 7 | ROU; 17 | HCY; 15 | SNM; 13 | TCM; 12 | MMS; 20 | ROU; 2 | CON | MYB | HCY | | | | 10th | 153 | |
| 2016 | Jeff Nasse | 51 | Ford | SNM; 12 | | | | | **ROU**; 1** | CON | MYB | HCY | SNM | | | | 23rd | 68 | |
| 2016 | Jeff Nasse | 51 | Chevy | | ROU; 22 | HCY | TCM | GRE | | | | | | | | | 23rd | 68 | |
| 2017 | Jeff Nasse | 51N | Chevy | CON | DOM | DOM | HCY | HCY | BRI; 4 | | | | | | | | 18th | 70 | |
| 2017 | Jeff Nasse | 51 | Ford | | | | | | | AND; 12 | ROU | TCM | | | | | 18th | 70 | |
| 2017 | Jeff Nasse | 51 | Chevy | | | | | | | | | | ROU; 18 | HCY | CON | | 18th | 70 | |
| 2017 | Jeff Nasse | 74 | Chevy | | | | | | | | | | | | | SBO; 1 | 18th | 70 | |
| 2018 | Jeff Nasse | 51N | Chevy | MYB | NSH; 7 | ROU; 2 | HCY | BRI; 12 | AND | HCY | ROU | SBO | | | | | 23rd | 53 | |
| 2019 | Jeff Nasse | 51 | Chevy | SNM; 5 | HCY | | MMS; 3 | **BRI**; 1 | HCY | ROU; 5 | SBO | | | | | | 6th | 142 | |
| 2019 | Jeff Nasse | 51N | Chevy | | | NSH; 12 | | | | | | | | | | | 6th | 142 | |
| 2020 | Jeff Nasse | 51 | Chevy | SNM; 3 | HCY | JEN; 18 | HCY | FCS | | | | | | | | | 10th | 105 | |
| 2020 | Jeff Nasse | 51N | Chevy | | | | | | BRI; 3 | FLC | NSH; 3 | | | | | | 10th | 105 | |
| 2021 | Jeff Nasse | 51 | Chevy | HCY | GPS; 1 | NSH; 3 | JEN; 5 | HCY | MMS | TCM; 2 | SBO | | | | | | 10th | 62 | |

=== ASA STARS National Tour ===
(key) (Bold – Pole position awarded by qualifying time. Italics – Pole position earned by points standings or practice time. * – Most laps led. ** – All laps led.)

ASA STARS National Tour results
| Year | Team | No. | Make | 1 | 2 | 3 | 4 | 5 | 6 | 7 | 8 | 9 | 10 | 11 | 12 | ASNTC | Pts | Ref |
|---|---|---|---|---|---|---|---|---|---|---|---|---|---|---|---|---|---|---|
| 2023 | Stephen Nasse Racing | 51N | Toyota | FIF; 28 | MAD; DNQ | | HCY; 7 | MLW | | | | | | | | 9th | 265 | |
| 2023 | Stephen Nasse Racing | 51 | Toyota | | | NWS; 17 | | | AND; 6 | WIR | TOL | | | | | 9th | 265 | |
| 2023 | Stephen Nasse Racing | 51N | Chevy | | | | | | | | | WIN; 3 | NSV; 25 | | | 9th | 265 | |
| 2024 | Stephen Nasse Racing | 51N | N/A | NSM; 22 | FIF; 2 | | | | | | | | | | | 10th | 294 | |
| 2024 | Stephen Nasse Racing | 51 | Toyota | | | HCY; 7 | MAD | MLW | AND; 9 | OWO | TOL | | | | | 10th | 294 | |
| 2024 | Stephen Nasse Racing | 51 | Chevy | | | | | | | | | WIN; 20 | NSV; 5 | | | 10th | 294 | |
| 2025 | Stephen Nasse Racing | 51N | Chevy | NSM; 5 | FIF; 4 | | | | | | | | | | | 5th | 568 | |
| 2025 | Stephen Nasse Racing | 51 | Chevy | | | DOM; 7 | HCY; 16 | NPS; 2 | MAD; 4 | SLG; 3 | AND; 16 | OWO | TOL | WIN; 5 | NSV; 5 | 5th | 568 | |
| 2026 | Stephen Nasse Racing | 51N | Chevy | NSM; 9 | FIF; 9 | HCY; 13 | SLG; 3 | MAD; 18 | NPS; 13 | OWO | TRI | WIN; 2 | NSV; 1 | | | -* | -* | |
| 2026 | Stephen Nasse Racing | 51N | Ford | | | | | | | | | | | NSM; 7 | | -* | -* | |

^{*} Season still in progress
^{1} Ineligible for series points
