= New Smyrna Speedway =

Race track

"Clyde's Place"
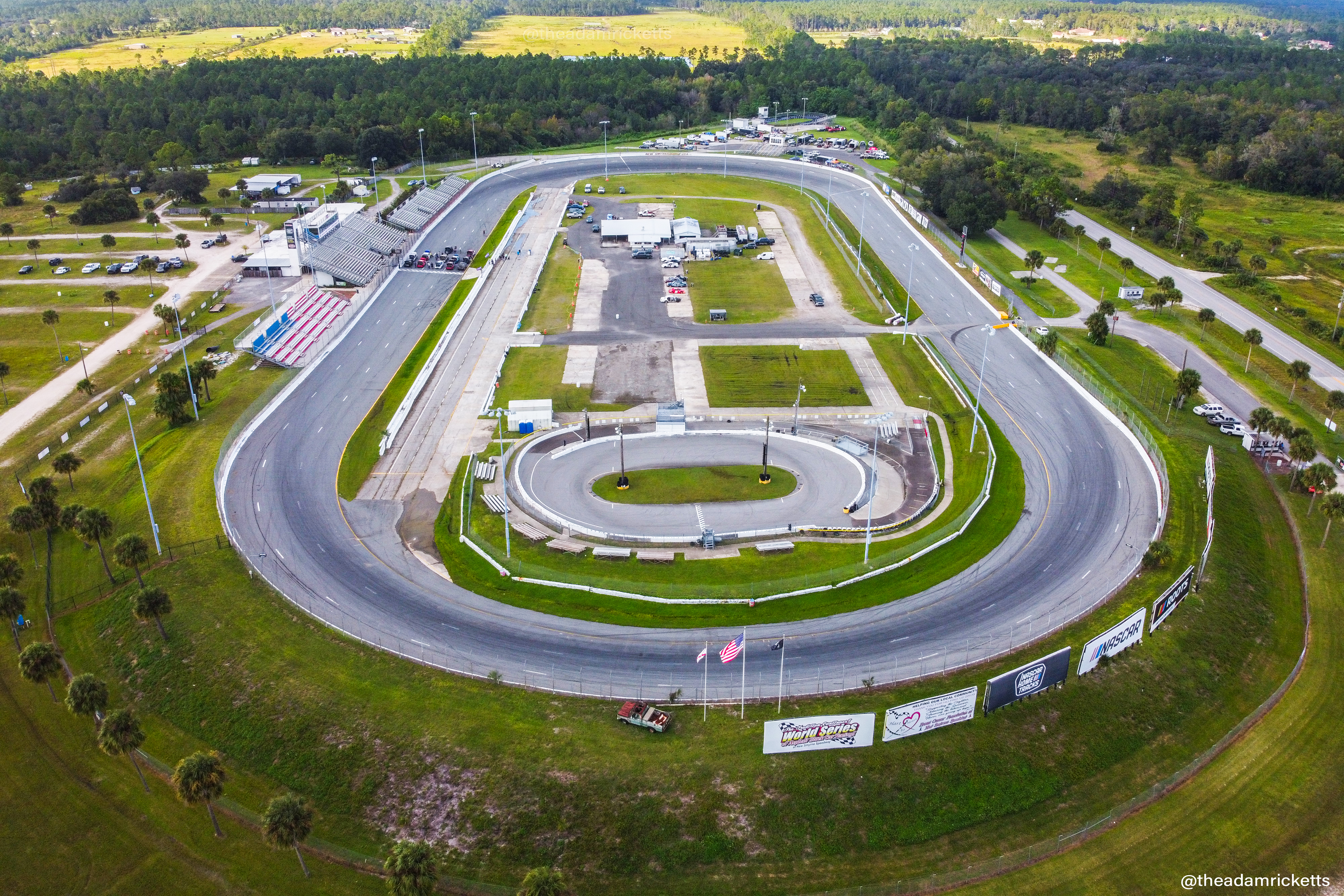
- Aerial view of New Smyrna Speedway in September 2020.
- Location: S.R. 44 and County Rd. 415, Samsula, Florida
- Coordinates: 29°00′48″N 81°04′12″W
- Capacity: 8,000
- Owner: Hart family
- Operator: Rusty Marcus & Holli Hanna
- Broke ground: January 1966; 60 years ago
- Opened: April 23, 1967; 59 years ago
- Construction cost: $183,000 Est.
- Architect: Benny Corbin
- Former names: Daytona Raceway (1966–1967)
- Major events: Current: ASA Southern Super Series; Florida Governor's Cup (1988–2021, 2023, 2025–present); NASCAR Whelen Modified Tour (2022–2026); Future: SMART Modified Tour (2027); Former: ARCA Menards Series East; Race to Stop Suicide 200 (2014–2022); American Canadian Tour (2015); X-1R Pro Cup Series (2002–2004, 2010–2011)
- Website: http://www.newsmyrnaspeedway.org/

Oval (1967–present)
- Surface: Asphalt
- Length: 0.500 mi (0.805 km)
- Turns: 4
- Banking: 23°

Little New Smyrna
- Surface: Asphalt
- Length: 0.052 mi (0.083 km)
- Turns: 4

New Smyrna Speedway is a 0.500 mi (0.805 km) asphalt oval racetrack located near New Smyrna Beach, Florida, that races the NASCAR Local Racing Series every Saturday night. It also has a smaller track, known as "Little New Smyrna Speedway" in the infield. This track races quarter midgets on Friday nights.

== Overview ==
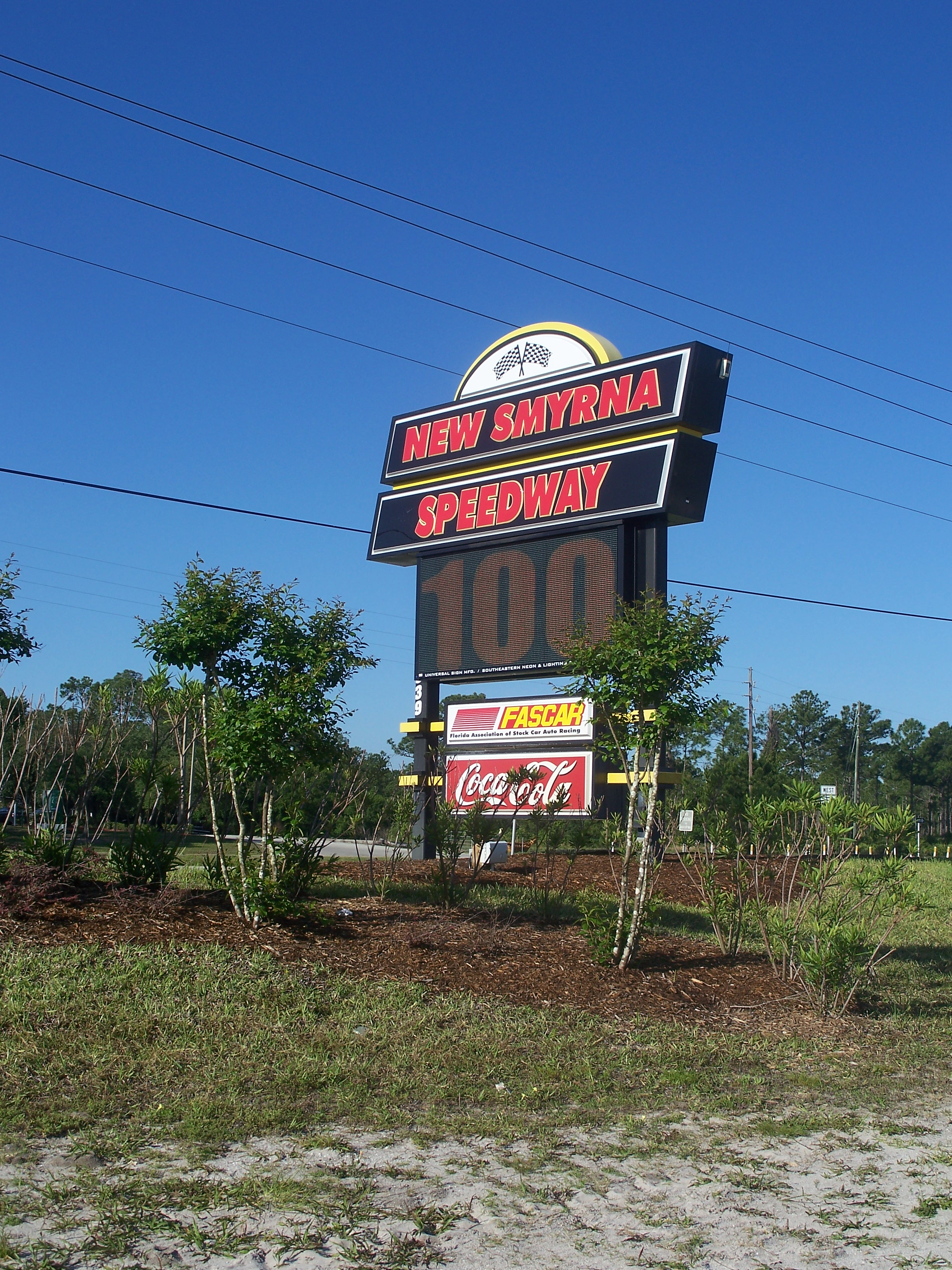
New Smyrna Speedway's sign

New Smyrna Speedway hosts the annual World Series of Asphalt Stock Car Racing, featuring nine consecutive nights of racing that runs during Speedweeks every February. The World Series has seen many of the current and former top names in NASCAR competing on the high-banked half-mile including Ryan Newman, Tony Stewart, Kyle Busch, Mark Martin, Geoff Bodine, Rick Wilson, Richie Evans, Jimmy Spencer, and Pete Hamilton, and continually draws skill from around the United States and Canada.

The event features NASCAR tour-type modifieds, "SK" type modifieds, Florida/IMCA-type modifieds, David Rogers super late models, late models, crate engine late models, winged sprint cars, and pro-trucks. Only Geoff Bodine and Ryan Newman have won a championship at the annual event, and gone on in their career to win the Daytona 500. The event included the Race to Stop Suicide 200, the ARCA Menards Series East season opener, from 2014 to 2022. The NASCAR Whelen Modified Tour has a race during the event since 2022.

The racing surface was repaved in January 2007.

== History ==
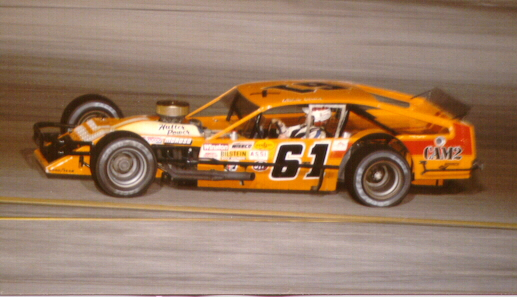
Richie Evans competes at New Smyrna Speedway circa 1985

=== Daytona Raceway ===
In 1966, Auto Racing Enterprises, Inc., leased and broke ground on what was to become "Daytona Raceway", in Samsula, Florida. The organizations secretary, Benny Corbin, designed the half-mile dirt oval with 13 degree banks and construction was completed by the East Coast Paving Company out of Palatka. After months of delays, leadership of Auto Racing Enterprises, Inc., shifted to Dan Epps and the track held its first event on April 23, 1967. The Sunday afternoon races provided space for 4,000 race fans with an admission price of $2 for adults, $1 for students, and free entry for children. The opening heats and the feature sportsman division event were both won by 27-year-old Budweiser route salesman Jimmy Sapp of Gainesville. Charley Brown of St. Augustine took the win in the late model division. Following the second week of operations, the track shut down for three weeks due to "powder dry" conditions of the track. Despite installing sprinklers systems, using water trucks, and starting races later in the day, dust issues persisted. Facing an unrelenting drought, the dirt oval became asphalt and the first race on the new surface was held on Labor Day of the same year with a 200-lap feature. Racing continued through the end of the season in November.

=== New Smyrna Speedway ===
Following disagreements with the members of Auto Racing Enterprises Inc., Benny Corbin and Dan Epps founded Florida Motor Speedways Inc., leased the property, and started the 1968 season with another major change. In an effort to avoid confusion with the nearby Daytona International Speedway (often referred to as the Daytona Raceway), the track changed its name to New Smyrna Speedway.

Afterwards, Corbin partnered with racing promoters Bob Bartel and Ed Otto to launch the World Series of Asphalt Auto Racing at New Smyrna Speedway.

The track's schedule traditionally starts the new NASCAR Advance Auto Parts Weekly Series club racing championship. Drivers across the country participate in the track's annual Red Eye held on the first weekend of January, where drivers can earn points towards the annual national and Florida state championships. The Red Eye was traditionally a 100 lap super late model race and later split into two separate 50-lap features, but for 2026 will expand to a pair of 60-lap features for the pro late models and David Rogers super late models, as the track renamed the premier class in memory of a local racer and former NASCAR Weekly Series national champion who died of cancer in 2020. The primary difference is engine and suspension regulations between the Late Model and David Rogers divisions. The David Rogers rules comply with Super Late Models such as those used in regional and national touring series. The Pro Late Models have a reduced horsepower engine similar to what is used in numerous lower series (CARS West) but the same offset chassis, unlike the Carolinas and Virginia NASCAR Late Model, which is a perimeter chassis.

== Florida Governor's Cup ==
New Smyrna Speedway began hosting the annual Florida Governor's Cup in 1988 each November. Initially known as the Florida State Late Model Championship, the Governor's Cup was commissioned by former Governor Haydon Burns to pay tribute to Al Keller, long time promoter of Florida short-track racing. Originating at Tampa's Golden State Speedway in 1963, the event was held at the Showtime Speedway in Pinellas Park as the Cup in 1979 and then as the State Championship from 1984 to 1987. It is one of the most sought-after short-track awards in the country.

In 2025, the race will be run with the ASA Southern Super Series, acting as the championship finale for the series and the track.

Governor's Cup Winners
Year	Winner	Location	Year	Winner	Location
1963^{†}	Dave McInnis	Golden Gate Speedway	2001	James Powell, III	New Smyrna Speedway
1964^{†}	Freddy Fryar	Golden Gate Speedway	2002	Mike Fritts	New Smyrna Speedway
1965	Wayne Reutimann	Golden Gate Speedway	2003	Wayne Anderson	New Smyrna Speedway
1966	Bobby Brack	Golden Gate Speedway	2004	Jeff Choquette	New Smyrna Speedway
1967	Dumont Smith	Golden Gate Speedway	2005	Mike Fritts	New Smyrna Speedway
1968	Gary Balough	Golden Gate Speedway	2006	Jeff Scofield	New Smyrna Speedway
1969	Robert Hamke	Golden Gate Speedway	2007	Jeff Choquette	New Smyrna Speedway
1970	Don Gregory	Golden Gate Speedway	2008	Wayne Anderson	New Smyrna Speedway
1971	Jack Arnold	Golden Gate Speedway	2009	Tim Russell	New Smyrna Speedway
1972	Ed Howe	Golden Gate Speedway	2010	David Rogers	New Smyrna Speedway
1973	Wayne Reutimann	Golden Gate Speedway	2011	Erik Jones	New Smyrna Speedway
1974	Ed Howe	Golden Gate Speedway	2012	Augie Grill	New Smyrna Speedway
1975	Ed Howe	Golden Gate Speedway	2013	Augie Grill	New Smyrna Speedway
1976	Ed Howe	Golden Gate Speedway	2014	Travis Cope	New Smyrna Speedway
1977	Robert Hamke	Golden Gate Speedway	2015	Ty Majeski	New Smyrna Speedway
1978	Dick Trickle	Golden Gate Speedway	2016	Ty Majeski	New Smyrna Speedway
1979^{‡}	Jim Fenton	Showtime Speedway	2017	Ty Majeski	New Smyrna Speedway
1981	Mike Eddy	Golden Gate Speedway	2018	Jeff Choquette	New Smyrna Speedway
1982	Jimmy Cope	Golden Gate Speedway	2019	Matt Craig	New Smyrna Speedway
1983	Leroy Porter	Golden Gate Speedway	2020	Bubba Pollard	New Smyrna Speedway
1984^{†}	Butch Miller	Showtime Speedway	2021	Sammy Smith	New Smyrna Speedway
1985^{†}	Butch Miller	Showtime Speedway	2023*	Stephen Nasse	New Smyrna Speedway
1986^{†}	Butch Miller	Showtime Speedway	2025*	Cole Butcher	New Smyrna Speedway
1987^{†}	Butch Miller	Showtime Speedway	2026	Carson Brown	New Smyrna Speedway
1988	Dick Anderson	New Smyrna Speedway			
1989	Dick Anderson	New Smyrna Speedway			
1990	Bobby Gill	New Smyrna Speedway			
1991	Bobby Gill	New Smyrna Speedway			
1992	Bobby Gill	New Smyrna Speedway			
1993	Pete Orr	New Smyrna Speedway			
1994	Pete Orr	New Smyrna Speedway			
1995	David Russell	New Smyrna Speedway			
1996	Jack Cook	New Smyrna Speedway			
1997	David Rogers	New Smyrna Speedway			
1998	Billy Bigley, Jr.	New Smyrna Speedway			
1999	Wayne Anderson	New Smyrna Speedway			
2000	Jimmy Cope	New Smyrna Speedway			
^{†}Race was branded only as the Florida State Late Model Championship, and the Cup was not awarded these years..^{‡}Event was relocated in 1979 and not held in 1980 due to EPA noise complaints at Golden Gate. *Event was cancelled in 2022 and 2024 due to weather.
