= Augie Grill =

American racing driver

- Born: November 14, 1976 (age 49); Birmingham, Alabama, U.S.
- Achievements: 2007, 2008 Snowball Derby Winner; 2007, 2009, 2010, 2011, 2019, Alabama 200 Winner (Most All-Time); 2009, 2011, 2016 Snowflake 100 Winner; 2009, 2019 Show Me The Money Pro Late Model Series Champion

NASCAR FedEx Freight Truck Series career
- 1 race run over 1 year
- 2012 position: 72nd
- Best finish: 72nd (2012)
- First race: 2012 American Ethanol 200 (Iowa)
Wins	Top tens	Poles
0	0	0

August Grill (born November 14, 1976) is an American professional stock car racing driver. He is the son of car owner and chassis builder, Frankie Grill. He currently races Super Late Models predominantly in the southeast. He is best known for winning the Snowball Derby in 2007 and 2008.

== Motorsports career results ==
=== NASCAR ===
(key) (Bold – Pole position awarded by qualifying time. Italics – Pole position earned by points standings or practice time. * – Most laps led.)

==== Camping World Truck Series ====
NASCAR Camping World Truck Series results
Year	Team	No.	Make	1	2	3	4	5	6	7	8	9	10	11	12	13	14	15	16	17	18	19	20	21	22	NCWTC	Pts	Ref
2012	Turner Motorsports	4	Chevy	DAY	MAR	CAR	KAN	CLT	DOV	TEX	KEN	IOW	CHI	POC	MCH	BRI	ATL	IOW; 27	KEN	LVS	TAL	MAR	TEX	PHO	HOM	72nd	17	

=== CARS Super Late Model Tour ===
(key)

CARS Super Late Model Tour results
Year	Team	No.	Make	1	2	3	4	5	6	7	8	9	10	11	12	13	CSLMTC	Pts	Ref
2017	N/A	112	Ford	CON	DOM	DOM	HCY	HCY	BRI; DNQ	AND	ROU	TCM	ROU	HCY	CON	SBO	N/A	0	
2019	N/A	112	Ford	SNM	HCY	NSH	MMS	BRI; 15	HCY	ROU	SBO						N/A	0	

=== CARS Pro Late Model Tour ===
(key)

CARS Pro Late Model Tour results
Year	Team	No.	Make	1	2	3	4	5	6	7	8	9	10	11	12	13	CPLMTC	Pts	Ref
2023	Alabama Brick Delivery Racing	43G	Ford	SNM	HCY	ACE	**NWS**; 1*	TCM	DIL	CRW	WKS	HCY	TCM	SBO	TCM	CRW	36th	37	
2025	Alabama Brick Delivery Racing	43	Ford	AAS	CDL; 24	OCS	ACE	NWS	CRW	HCY	HCY	AND	FLC	SBO	TCM	NWS	80th	18	

=== ASA STARS National Tour ===
(key) (Bold – Pole position awarded by qualifying time. Italics – Pole position earned by points standings or practice time. * – Most laps led. ** – All laps led.)

ASA STARS National Tour results
Year	Team	No.	Make	1	2	3	4	5	6	7	8	9	10	ASNTC	Pts	Ref
2023	Augie Grill	112	Chevy	FIF	MAD	NWS; DNQ	HCY	MLW	AND	WIR	TOL	WIN	NSV	107th	15	
