= Travis Braden =

American racing driver

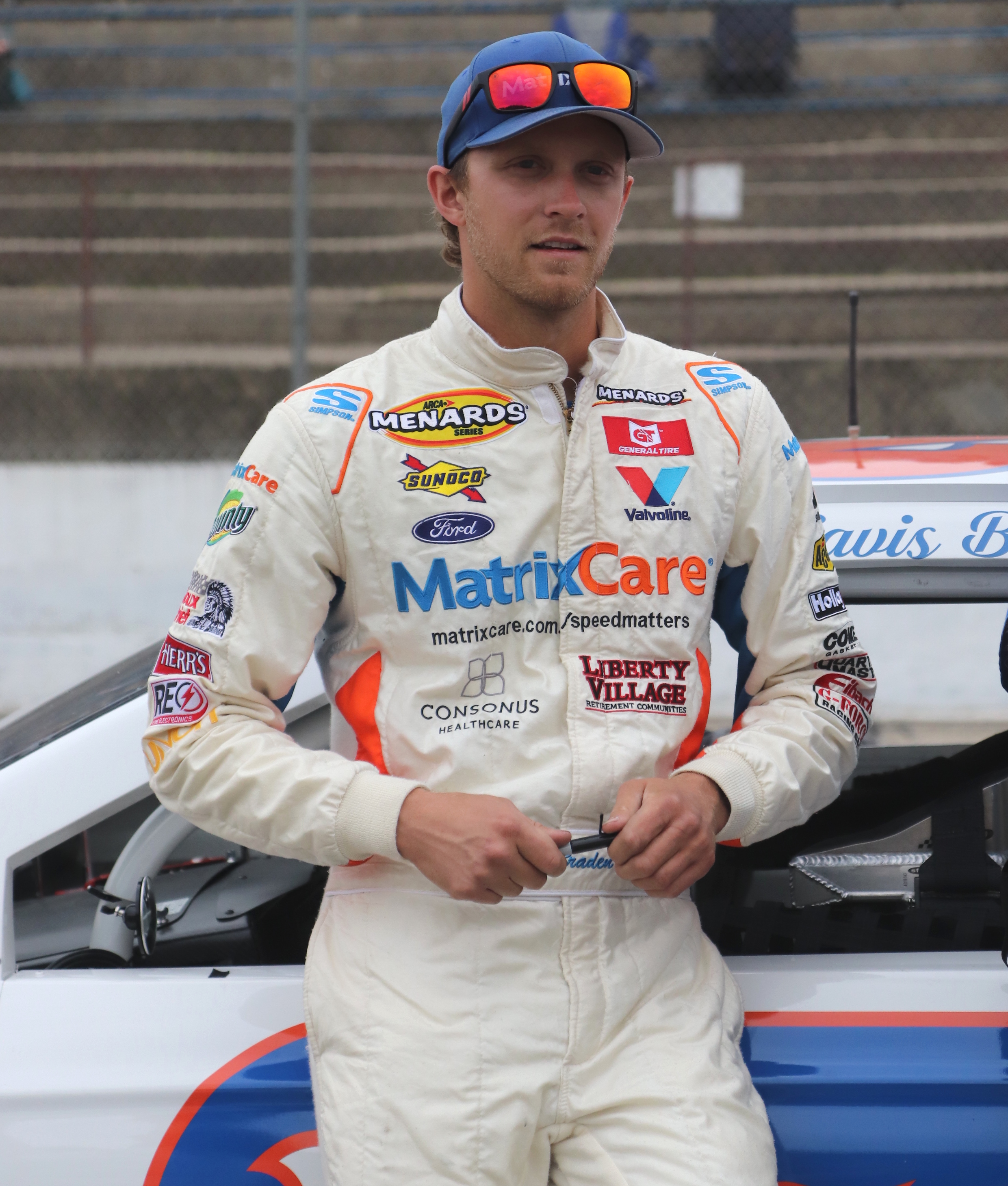
- Braden in 2019
- Born: Travis Donald Braden; March 25, 1994 (age 32); Wheeling, West Virginia, U.S.
- Achievements: 2013, 2014 ARCA/CRA Super Series Champion; 2019 Snowball Derby Winner; 2016 Winchester 400 Winner

ARCA Menards Series career
- 50 races run over 5 years
- Best finish: 4th (2019)
- First race: 2015 Sioux Chief PowerPEX 200 (IRP)
- Last race: 2019 Kansas ARCA 150 (Kansas)
- First win: 2015 Sioux Chief PowerPEX 200 (IRP)
Wins	Top tens	Poles
1	34	0
- Statistics up to date as of August 8, 2022.

Travis Donald Braden (born March 25, 1994) is an American professional stock car racing driver. He most recently competed full-time in the ARCA Menards Series, driving the No. 27 Ford for RFMS Racing. He currently serves as a mechanic for Hendrick Motorsports on the No. 48 Chevrolet Camaro ZL1 for Alex Bowman. He has also raced super late models, winning the Winchester 400 in 2016 and the Snowball Derby in 2019.

== Racing career ==
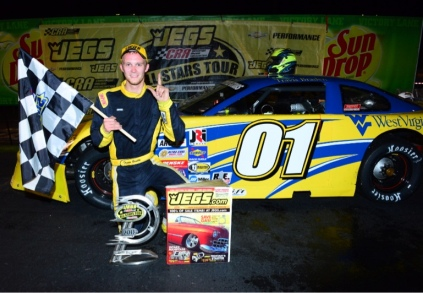
Braden in victory lane at Berlin Raceway in 2014

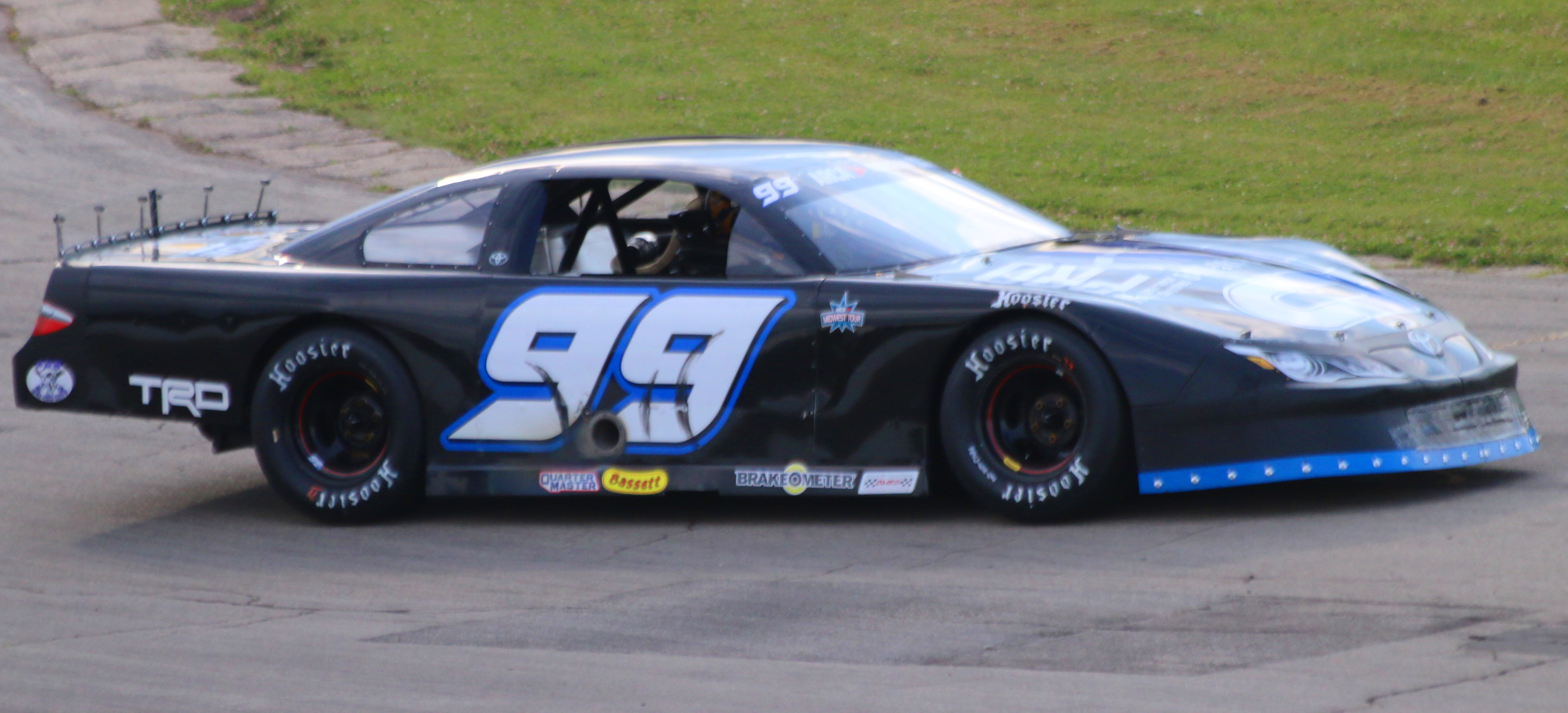
Braden in the ARCA Midwest Tour race at Wisconsin International Raceway in 2017

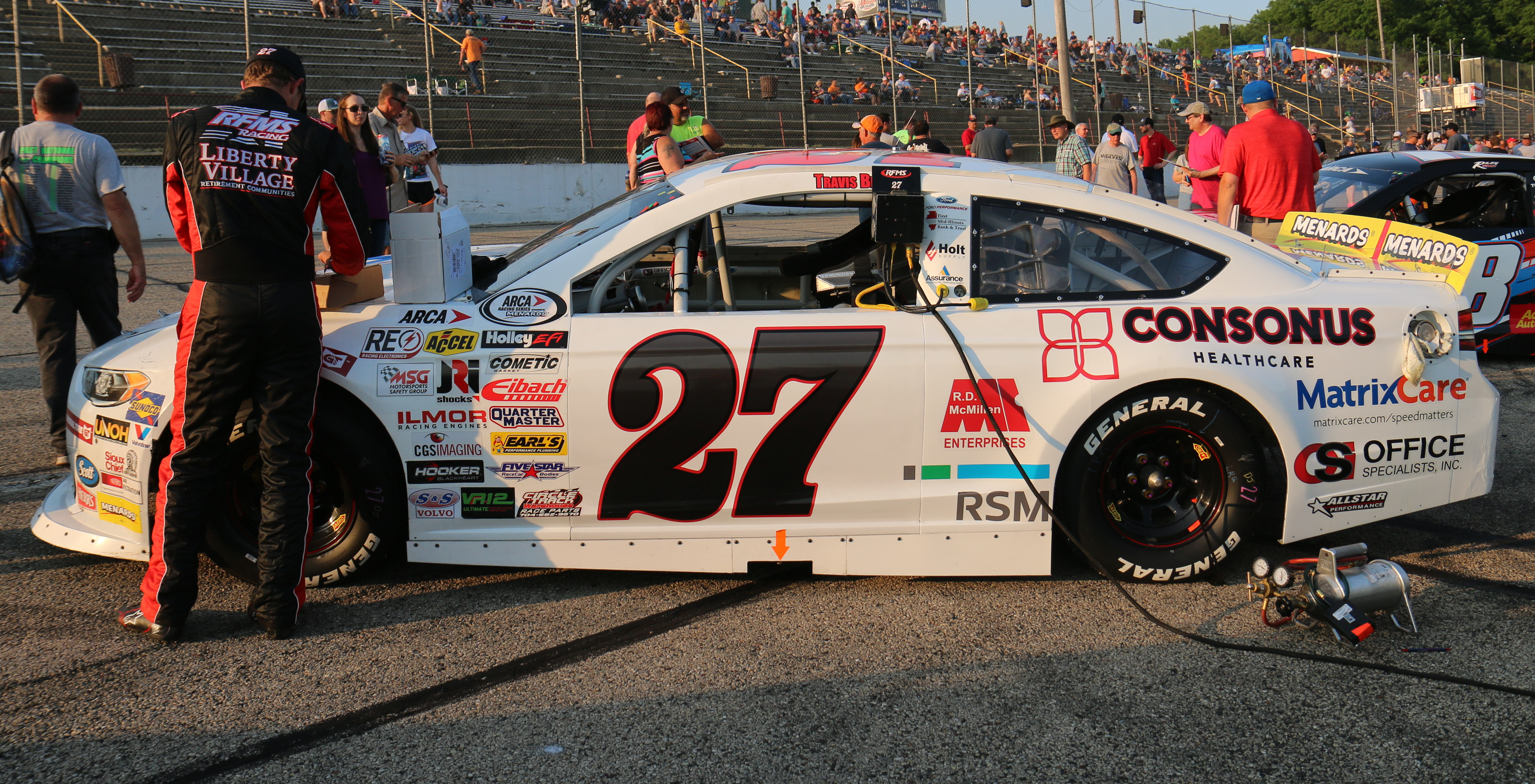
Braden's 2018 ARCA car at Madison

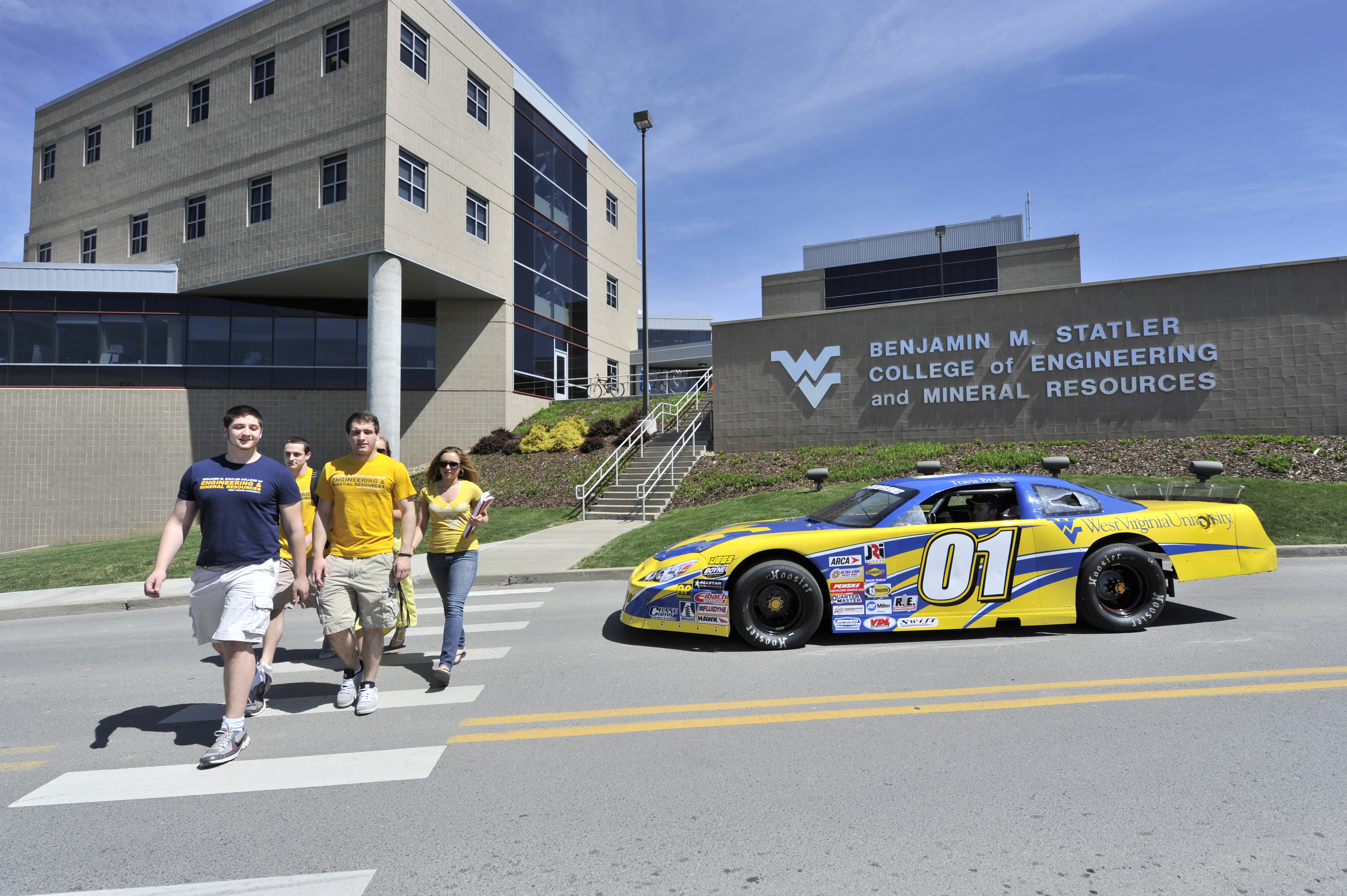
Braden's No. 01 late model on the campus of West Virginia University

Braden began racing when he was eight years old, competing in mini-wedges, quarter-midgets and Legends car racing, winning a Young Lions national points championship. He later won the Whelen All-American Series state championship in Ohio.

He raced super late models in 2013 and 2014, winning the ARCA/CRA Super Series championship both of those years.

Braden made his ARCA Menards Series debut in 2015, and won his first start in the series, passing William Byron near the end of the race at Lucas Oil Raceway.

In 2016, Braden went super late model racing, winning the Winchester 400 in Winchester, Indiana.

After running part-time for RFMS Racing in the 2017 ARCA Racing Series, the team and Braden agreed to a full-time slate in 2018. Braden returned to RFMS for a second full season in 2019, and early in the year, led the championship point standings, which he would finish fourth in at the end of the season.

In 2019, Braden entered the Snowball Derby for the first time. He qualified 30th, the last car in on time trials, after qualifying with a rebuilt car after being wrecked by another competitor in practice. He was declared the winner of the race after original winner Stephen Nasse's car failed post-race technical inspection.

In early 2020, Braden revealed that he would not contest another season in the ARCA Menards Series, instead using the year to move to Charlotte, North Carolina and focus on large super late model races and races in NASCAR's top three divisions.

== Personal life ==
Braden is a native of Wheeling, West Virginia, and attended West Virginia University where he double-majored in aerospace and mechanical engineering. Braden is a 2012 graduate of Wheeling Park High School.

== Motorsports career results ==
=== ARCA Menards Series ===
(key) (Bold – Pole position awarded by qualifying time. Italics – Pole position earned by points standings or practice time. * – Most laps led.)

ARCA Menards Series results
Year	Team	No.	Make	1	2	3	4	5	6	7	8	9	10	11	12	13	14	15	16	17	18	19	20	ARSC	Pts	Ref
2015	Platinum Motorsports	01	Chevy	DAY	MOB	NSH	SLM	TAL	TOL	NJE	POC	MCH	CHI	WIN	IOW	IRP; 1	POC	BLN	ISF	DSF	SLM	KEN; 2	KAN; 6	36th	655	
2016	Platinum Motorsports	01	Chevy	DAY	NSH	SLM	TAL	TOL	NJE	POC	MCH; 4	MAD	WIN	IOW	IRP	POC	BLN	ISF	DSF	SLM	CHI; 7	KEN	KAN	61st	405	
2017	Platinum Motorsports	01	Ford	DAY; 22	NSH	SLM	TAL	TOL	ELK	POC	MCH	MAD	IOW	IRP	POC									31st	845	
2017	RFMS Racing	27	Ford													WIN; 4	ISF	ROA	DSF	SLM	CHI; 11	KEN; 9	KAN; 17	31st	845	
2018	RFMS Racing	27	Ford	DAY; 22	NSH; 15	SLM; 14	TAL; 9	TOL; 8	CLT; 11	POC; 4	MCH; 12	MAD; 11	GTW; 9	CHI; 7	IOW; 9	ELK; 7	POC; 9	ISF; 4	BLN; 3	DSF; 15	SLM; 5	IRP; 12	KAN; 20	5th	4445	
2019	RFMS Racing	27	Ford	DAY; 8	FIF; 10	SLM; 12	TAL; 7	NSH; 8	TOL; 13	CLT; 9	POC; 10	MCH; 6	MAD; 4	GTW; 7	CHI; 5	ELK; 12	IOW; 7	POC; 9	ISF; 11	DSF; 7	SLM; 9	IRP; 7	KAN; 5	4th	4780	

=== CARS Super Late Model Tour ===
(key)

CARS Super Late Model Tour results
Year	Team	No.	Make	1	2	3	4	5	6	7	8	9	10	11	12	13	CSLMTC	Pts	Ref
2017	N/A	22	Toyota	CON	DOM	DOM	HCY	HCY	BRI; 22	AND	ROU	TCM	ROU	HCY	CON	SBO	N/A	0	
2020	Bryan Rogers	77	Chevy	SNM; 4	HCY	JEN	HCY	FCS	BRI	FLC	NSH						22nd	29	

=== CARS Pro Late Model Tour ===
(key)

CARS Pro Late Model Tour results
Year	Team	No.	Make	1	2	3	4	5	6	7	8	9	10	11	12	13	CPLMTC	Pts	Ref
2024	Mavrick Page Motorsports	51	Chevy	SNM	HCY	OCS	ACE	TCM	CRW	HCY	NWS	ACE; 9			TCM; 10	NWS; 6	18th	119	
2024	Mavrick Page Motorsports	51B	Chevy										FLC; 15	SBO; 6			18th	119	
