= Bobby Gill =

American racing driver (1959–2024)

- Born: June 25, 1959; Sarasota, Florida, U.S.
- Died: October 17, 2024 (aged 65)
- Achievements: 1999, 2000, 2001, 2007 USAR Hooters Pro Cup Champion; 1993, 1997 Snowball Derby Winner; 1994 All American 400 Winner

NASCAR FedEx Freight Truck Series career
- 16 races run over 2 years
- Best finish: 21st (1996)
- First race: 1996 Florida Dodge Dealers 400 (Homestead)
- Last race: 2000 Quaker State 200 (Memphis)
Wins	Top tens	Poles
0	4	0
- Statistics up to date as of December 30, 2012.

Bobby Gill (June 25, 1959 – October 17, 2024) was an American professional stock car racing driver. He raced for a number of years in the NASCAR Craftsman Truck Series, earning four top-tens in 16 starts.

== Pre-NASCAR career ==
Prior to racing in NASCAR's national touring series, Gill found success in NASCAR's All-Pro Series, and was the winner of the ASA's Miller 300 at the Minnesota State Fairgrounds in 1995.

== Career ==
Most of Gill's starts in the NASCAR Craftsman Truck Series came in 1996, when he started off with Spears Motorsports. In his debut with the team, he started 15th and finished 23rd at Homestead-Miami. Then, the very next race at Phoenix, Gill earned his first career top-ten with a ninth-place showing. He would later better that with a seventh at Tucson and Bristol and a sixth at Milwaukee. He also earned one top-ten start at Colorado. After an 11th-place finish at Louisville, Gill was released from the team for unspecified reasons. He was running 11th in the points at the time, just thirty points out of tenth.

Gill recovered by joining Billy Ballew Motorsports for three races in later 1996. After finishing 22nd at Nashville, Gill closed out the year with a pair of 11ths, allowing him to finish 21st in points, despite missing ten races during the year.

Gill returned to the series for two starts in 2000. He started seventh in his season debut at Milwaukee before finishing 34th due to a rear end gear failure. He did not fare much better at Memphis, where he crashed to 32nd. This would be Gill's final start in a major NASCAR series.

== Post-NASCAR ==
Residing in Dalton, Georgia, Gill carved out a successful niche in the USAR Hooters Pro Cup developmental series where he won three straight championships from 1999 to 2001. Gill added his fourth USAR championship in 2007.

Gill died from brain cancer on October 17, 2024, at the age of 65.

== Motorsports career results ==
=== NASCAR ===
(key) (Bold – Pole position awarded by qualifying time. Italics – Pole position earned by points standings or practice time. * – Most laps led.)

==== Craftsman Truck Series ====
NASCAR Craftsman Truck Series results
Year	Team	No.	Make	1	2	3	4	5	6	7	8	9	10	11	12	13	14	15	16	17	18	19	20	21	22	23	24	NCTC	Pts	Ref
1996	Spears Motorsports	75	Chevy	HOM; 23	PHO; 9	POR; 20	EVG; 26	TUS; 7	CNS; 11	HPT; 15	BRI; 7	NZH; 18	MLW; 6	LVL; 11	I70	IRP	FLM	GLN										21st	1818	
1996	Billy Ballew Motorsports	15	Ford																NSV; 22	RCH	NHA; 11	MAR; 11	NWS	SON	MMR	PHO	LVS	21st	1818	
2000	Billy Ballew Motorsports	15	Ford	DAY	HOM	PHO	MMR	MAR; 34	PIR	GTY	MEM; 32	PPR	EVG	TEX	KEN	GLN	MLW	NHA	NZH	MCH	IRP	NSV; DNQ	CIC	RCH	DOV	TEX	CAL	107th	66	

Achievements
Preceded by Rich Bickle	Snowball Derby Winner; 1997	Succeeded by Rich Bickle
Preceded by Gary St. Amant	Snowball Derby Winner; 1993	Succeeded by Tammy Jo Kirk
