= Chris Gabehart =

American NASCAR crew chief (born 1981)

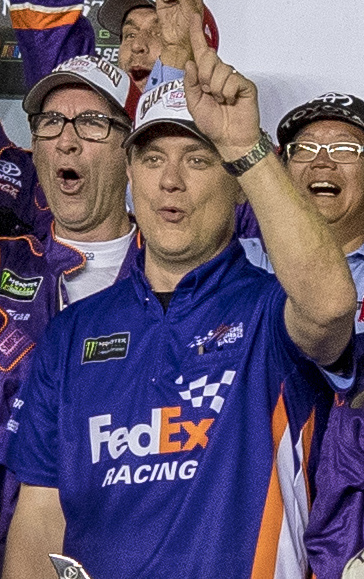
- Gabehart after winning the 2019 Daytona 500

Personal information
- Nationality: (United States) American
- Born: Christopher Allen Gabehart; May 16, 1981 (age 45) Louisville, Kentucky, U.S.

Sport
- Country: United States
- Sport: NASCAR Cup Series
- Team: Spire Motorsports

Christopher Allen Gabehart (born May 16, 1981) is an American NASCAR director of competition and former stock car racing driver. He currently works for Spire Motorsports as their Chief Motorsports Officer. He formally worked for Joe Gibbs Racing from 2012 to 2025, first as an engineer, then a crew chief for Denny Hamlin's No. 11 NASCAR Cup Series car from 2019 to 2024, then as Director of Competition in 2025. Before becoming an engineer and crew chief, Gabehart was a driver himself and won the CRA Super Series championship in 2007 and won the All American 400 in 2008.

== Career ==
=== Driving career ===
Gabehart began his career in racing as a driver, starting to race go-karts at age ten in the World Karting Association. Quickly succeeding in that series, he picked up numerous national championships before competing in late model racing. He drove full-time in the ARCA/CRA Super Series in 2007 for his family team. He won the series championship, but quit driving after that season due to sponsorship and financial issues.

=== Crew chiefing career ===
Gabehart met Tom Busch, the father of NASCAR superstar Kyle Busch during his late model season in 2007, which led him to working as an engineer for Kyle Busch Motorsports' late model program and later in the Truck Series for the team. Then, Gabehart would move up to Joe Gibbs Racing in the Cup Series in 2012 as an engineer on Busch's No. 18 car.

==== 2016–2018: JGR Xfinity teams ====
Gabehart's first crew chiefing job came in 2016, where he worked with defending Truck Series champion Erik Jones in his first and only full season in the Xfinity Series. They were in contention for the championship after a multiple-win season for the team, but lost the championship to fellow JGR driver Daniel Suárez. When Jones moved up to the Cup Series full-time in 2017, the car was driven by multiple drivers, including JGR Cup drivers Erik Jones, Hamlin and Suárez, as well as up-and-comers Kyle Benjamin and Ryan Preece. For 2018, Gabehart moved from the No. 20 to the No. 19 to crew chief Brandon Jones, who joined JGR that year from Richard Childress Racing.

==== 2019–2025: No. 11 Cup Series team and JGR Competition Director ====
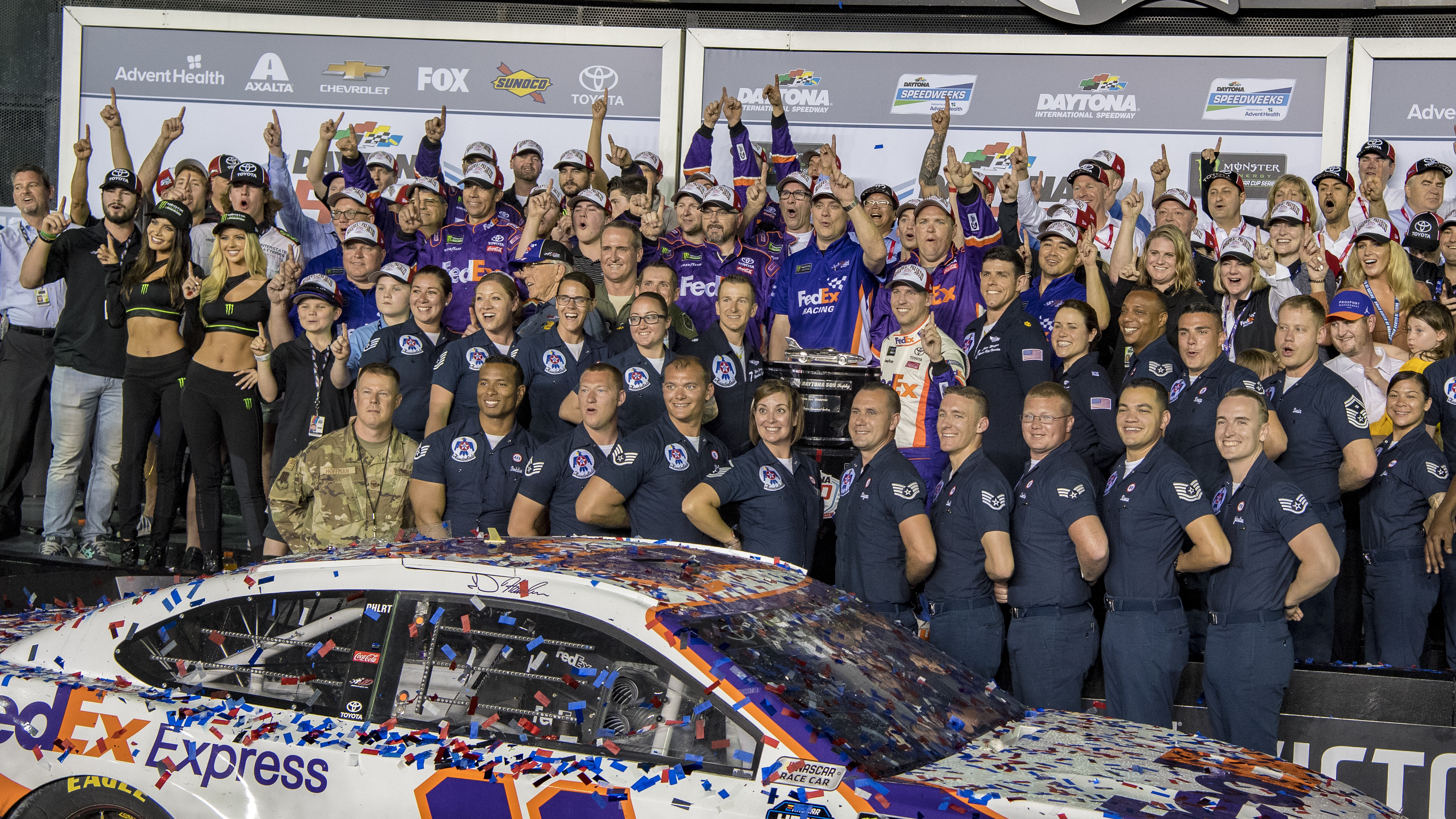
Gabehart (above the Harley J. Earl Trophy) after winning the 2019 Daytona 500

In 2019, Gabehart was assigned as the crew chief of the No. 11 driven by Denny Hamlin. Both Hamlin and Gabehart started the season by winning the 2019 Daytona 500, breaking Hamlin's 47-race winless streak. With four wins, the duo finished the season fourth in the points standings.

Gabehart and Hamlin started the 2020 season by winning their second (and Hamlin's overall third) Daytona 500. Gabehart was suspended for four races after Hamlin's car dropped a ballast prior to the start of the 2020 Coca-Cola 600. With a total of seven wins, the No. 11 team once again finished fourth in the points standings.

On May 3, 2022, Gabehart was suspended for four races due to a tire and wheel loss at Dover.

On November 22, 2024, JGR promoted Gabehart to competition director while Chris Gayle was named the new crew chief of the No. 11 car starting in 2025.

==== 2026–present: Spire Motorsports Chief Motorsports Officer and lawsuit against JGR. ====
On December 3, 2025, outside the courtroom during the 23XI Racing v. NASCAR trial, reporter Jenna Fryer confirmed that Gabehart had left JGR and was rumored to be heading to Spire Motorsports in 2026. However, there has been no official announcement regarding his status for 2026, although on February 19, 2026, JGR filed a lawsuit against Gabehart, claiming he took confidential team information and accepted a leadership role with Spire.

On February 21, 2026, Spire confirmed that Gabehart was hired as their Chief Motorsports Officer. On February 24, 2026, JGR requested a temporary restraining order from the courts preventing Gabehart from working in a comparable competitive role for Spire during the non-compete period.

== Personal life ==
Gabehart was born and grew up in Louisville, Kentucky. He went to Indiana to attend Purdue University, where he met his wife, Jennifer Schafer Gabehart and graduated in 2005 with a mechanical engineering degree. He was the first member of his family to go to college. Both Gabehart's grandfather Al Straub and father Kevin inspired him to go racing, as Straub had previously been a NASCAR driver in the 1960s and 1970s and his father had competed in NASCAR-sanctioned races at his home track of Louisville Motor Speedway. Gabehart moved to the Charlotte, North Carolina area in 2010 to pursue a career in professional racing. He still resides there with his wife and 2 children, Leona Laine Gabehart and Fletcher Fitzgerald Gabehart.
