= Gary St. Amant =

American racing driver

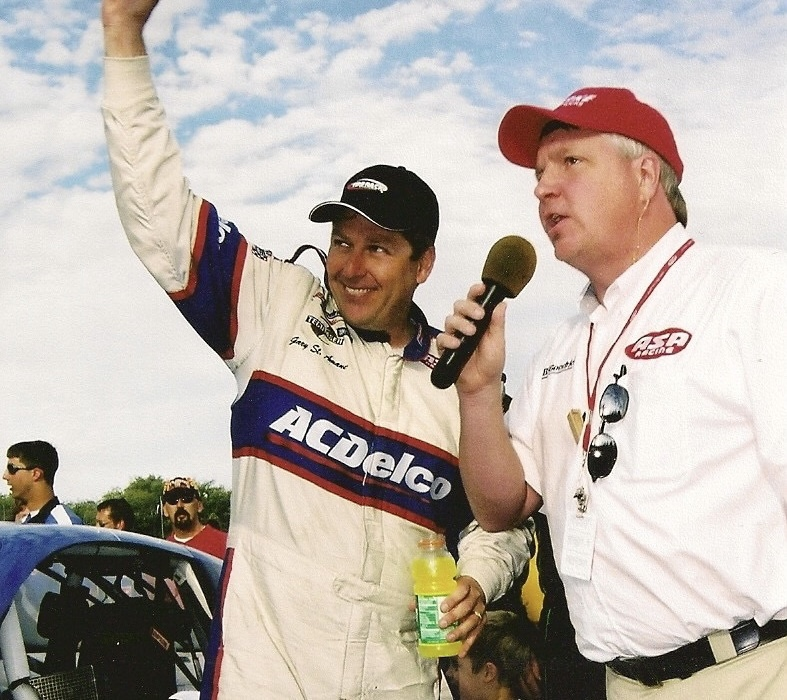
- Born: Gary Wayne St. Amant; October 19, 1962 (age 64); Columbus, Ohio, U.S.
- Achievements: 1998, 2000 American Speed Association Champion; 2007 Hooters Pro Cup Series Northern Division Champion; 1992, 2000 Snowball Derby Winner; 1999 Snowflake 100 Winner; 1990 All American 400 Winner; 1999, 2002 Winchester 400 Winner
- Awards: Seven-Time American Speed Association Outstanding Sportsmanship Recipient

NASCAR FedEx Freight Truck Series career
- 5 races run over 5 years
- 2008 position: 116th
- Best finish: 64th (1995)
- First race: 1995 Action Packed Racing Cards 150 (IRP)
- Last race: 2008 Ohio 250 (Mansfield)
| Wins | Top tens | Poles |
|---|---|---|
| 0 | 0 | 0 |

Gary Wayne St. Amant (born October 19, 1962) is an American former stock car racing driver from Columbus, Ohio. While he competed in several NASCAR Craftsman Truck Series races, his career is most notable for his success in the American Speed Association, winning the National Tour in 1998 and 2000. When the ASA folded after the 2004 season, he found success in the Hooters Pro Cup Series, winning the Northern Division Championship in 2007. With St. Amant having won the Snowball Derby and Winchester 400 twice, along with the All American 400 and Snowflake 100 once, he is the only driver in history besides Chase Elliott to have won all four short-track crown jewel events. He also showed his mentorship to a young Jimmie Johnson in his early ASA days, before his transition to NASCAR. Johnson has since mentioned his appreciation for the coaching while making history himself in the NASCAR Sprint Cup Series.

== ASA career ==
St. Amant's career in the ASA National Tour began in April 1986 at Auburn, Michigan's Tri-City Motor Speedway with an 11th-place finish. He scored his first ASA win at his home track, Columbus Motor Speedway, in the 1990 Buckeye 300, holding off Rich Bickle and Ted Musgrave. Later that fall, he won the prestigious All-American 400 at Nashville's Music City Motorplex, which also counted as a win in the All Pro Series. He managed another hometown win at Columbus in 1996, leading all 200 laps from the pole.

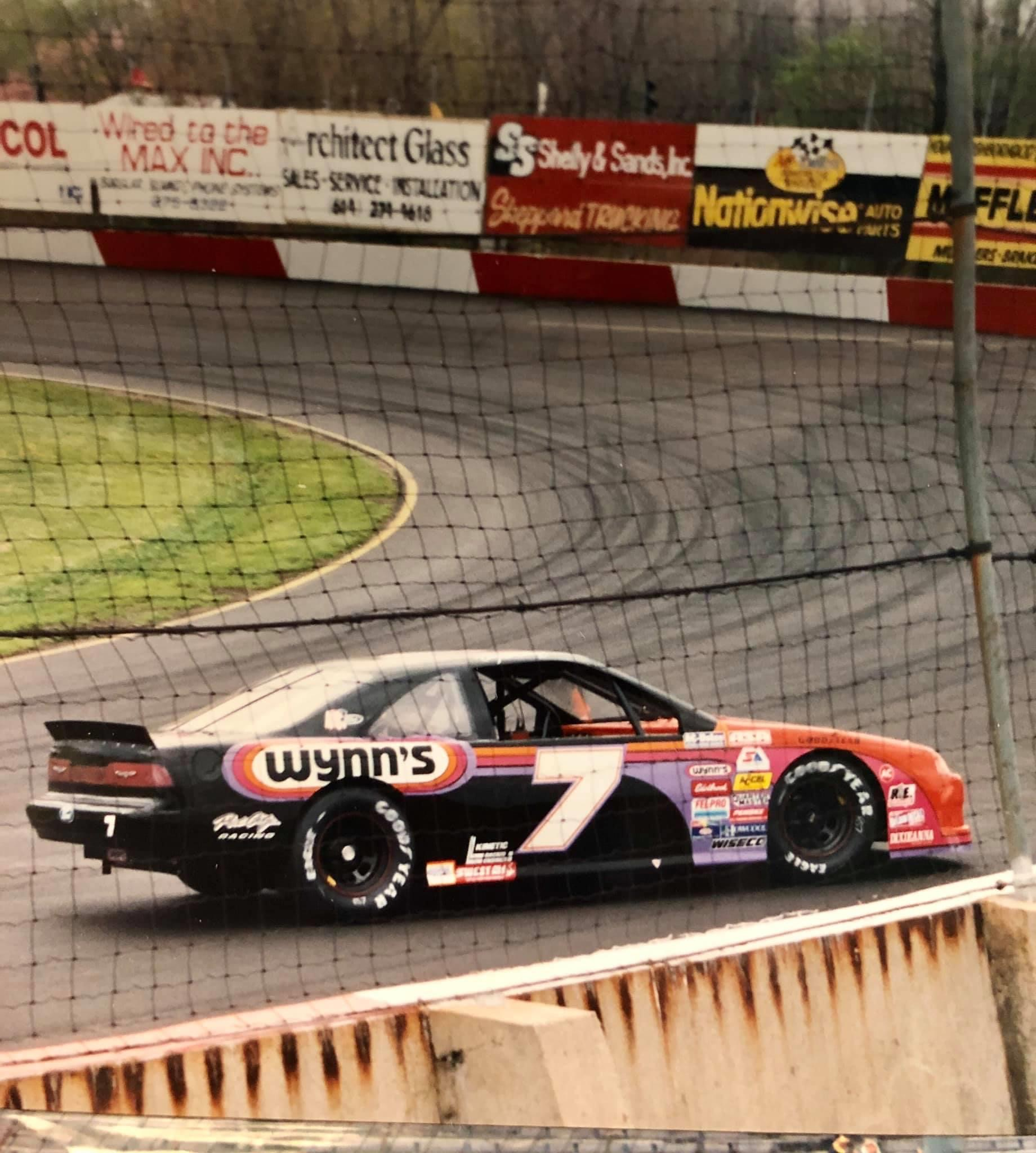
St.Amant in the iconic Wynn’s livery at an ASA event at Columbus Motor Speedway

In 1998, though he only managed two wins (Orange County Speedway and Berlin Raceway) to Scott Hansen's seven, St. Amant was more consistent, and leading nearly twice as many laps as any other driver helped him claim the 1998 title. His 2000 championship was won quite similarly; domination and consistent Top 5 finishes placed the Winchester 400 winner nearly 500 points ahead of second place Kevin Cywinski. After playing second fiddle to NASCAR-bound rookie Johnny Sauter in 2001, St. Amant and Joey Clanton waged war for the 2002 championship. Clanton won the first five races of the season (winning nine overall) and ultimately led over 35% of the laps, but had several poor finishes during the year. St. Amant won just four times (all but one of the final five races) but had only two finishes outside of the top-ten. St. Amant won the season-ending Winchester 400, but Clanton recovered from a late-race crash to finish third, defeating St. Amant for the title by one point, the closest points margin in series history.

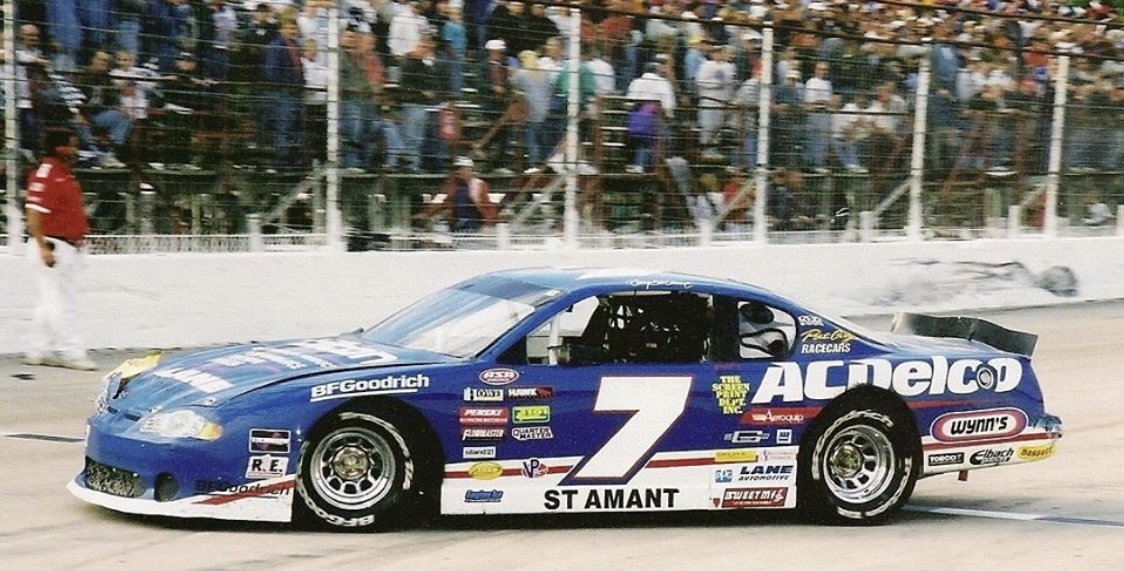
StAmant after winning the 2002 Winchester 400, his final ASA victory

After the 2002 season, St. Amant and team owner Bud Gebben parted ways after claiming two championships. St. Amant would later join Frankie Grill's Grand American team, driving his historical No. 7 in Jani-King colors. After several mechanical failures, he would leave Grill's team early in the season and join Appalachian Motorsports. Even while resurfacing with a new team, good luck continued to elude him.

While his 2003 season was already hitting rock bottom, St. Amant's season only got worse during the ninth round at Mansfield Motorsports Park. During the late stages of the race, he clipped the left rear of another car, losing control and spinning down the frontstretch. His racecar stopped with the driver's side facing oncoming traffic. His teammate, Stephen Leicht, swerved to avoid, but instead drilled into St. Amant's door. St. Amant suffered four broken bones in his lower back, bruised kidneys and bruises throughout his arms and shoulders, and was sidelined for the following race at Indianapolis Raceway Park.

For the remainder of the 2003 and 2004 seasons, St. Amant did not win again in the ASA, with his best finish of fourth coming at Illiana Motor Speedway late in 2003. His last start came in September 2004: a 17th-place result at Minnesota's Elko Speedway.

Upon the demise of the series at season's end, St. Amant sat eighth on the all-time wins list with 21 triumphs. He also won pole position 26 times, led 6427 laps, and is the all-time money leader with over $2 million in career earnings.

== NASCAR ==
St. Amant competed quite sparingly in NASCAR-sanctioned events. In 1994, he won the Pro Gold 400 NASCAR All Pro Series race at Myrtle Beach Speedway, joining several other Midwest short track stars moonlighting in the Southern-based series. In 1995, he debuted in the new NASCAR SuperTruck Series, finishing 11th at Indianapolis Raceway Park. On the final lap, he was racing former ASA champion Johnny Benson for second place, but spun on the backstraight and hit a light pole (which went dark upon impact). St. Amant restarted the truck and took the checkered flag to complete the 150th lap (in the Busch Series race the following night Chris Diamond would hit the same light pole). In four more Truck Series starts, he never finished better than 25th.

== Hooters Pro Cup Series ==
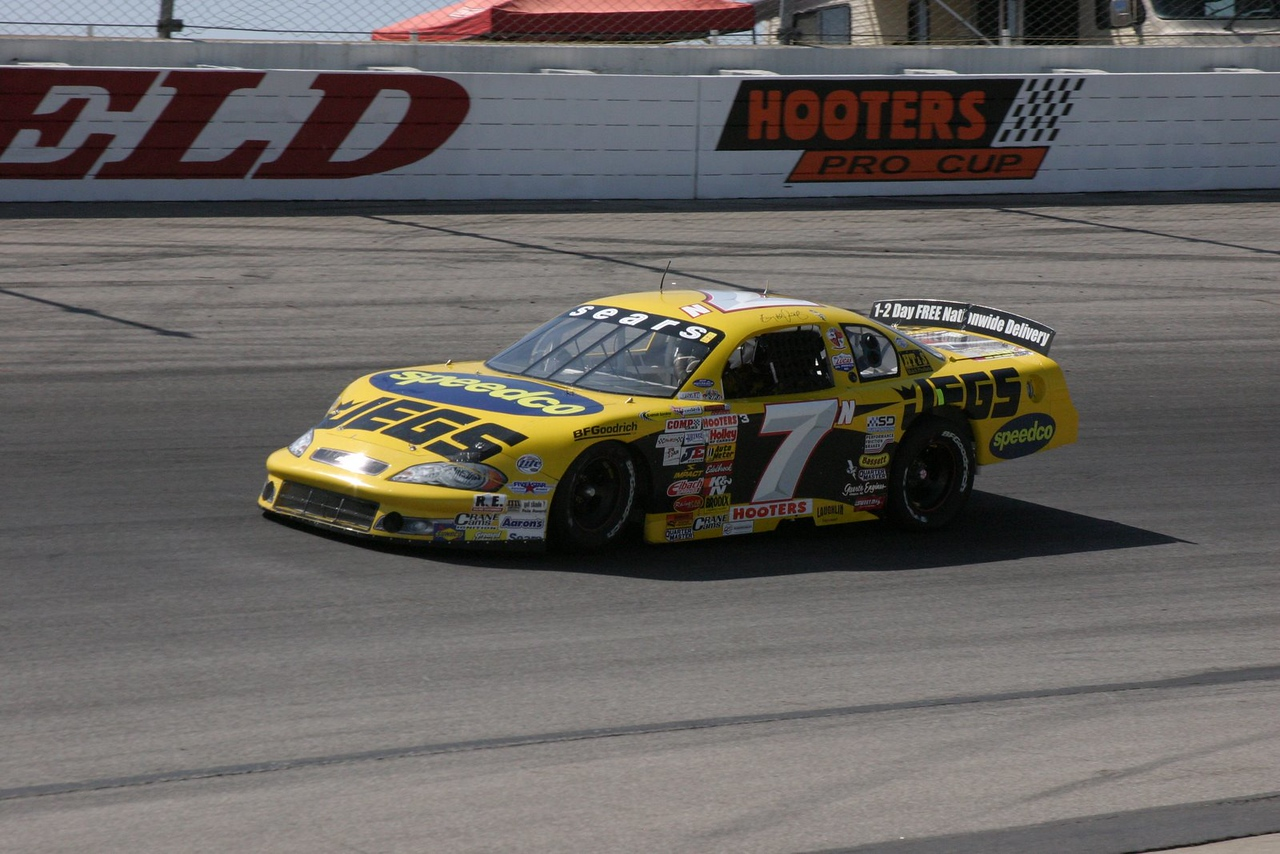
St.Amant’s 2007 Pro Cup Car

After the ASA was discontinued, St. Amant joined the growing Hooters Pro Cup Series with Bullet Racing. Though not a dominant driver, consistency through experience (44% of his starts resulted in a top-five finish) placed him no worse than ninth in his five full seasons in the series. He won only twice, at Lake Erie Speedway in 2004 and Salem Speedway in 2007, but better consistency than the dominant Benny Gordon took him to the 2007 Hooters Pro Cup Series Northern Division championship.

== Post-racing career ==
Since leaving the now CARS Tour after the 2008 season, St. Amant has worked out of his raceshop located outside of Columbus. He has aided former Hendrick Motorsports driver Landon Cassill in various short-track events, as well as being a crew chief and driver coach for Joe Gibbs Racing development driver Cody Coughlin. Since 2014, he has helped two-time CRA Super Series champion Travis Braden, including leading him to his second-consecutive championship in 2014. St. Amant planned to continue to aid Braden in the premier CRA division as well as some ARCA Racing Series events throughout 2015.

== Motorsports career results ==
=== NASCAR ===
(key) (Bold – Pole position awarded by qualifying time. Italics – Pole position earned by points standings or practice time. * – Most laps led.)

==== Craftsman Truck Series ====
NASCAR Craftsman Truck Series results
| Year | Team | No. | Make | 1 | 2 | 3 | 4 | 5 | 6 | 7 | 8 | 9 | 10 | 11 | 12 | 13 | 14 | 15 | 16 | 17 | 18 | 19 | 20 | 21 | 22 | 23 | 24 | 25 | 26 | 27 | NCTC | Pts | Ref |
|---|---|---|---|---|---|---|---|---|---|---|---|---|---|---|---|---|---|---|---|---|---|---|---|---|---|---|---|---|---|---|---|---|---|
| 1995 | Doran Racing | 77 | Chevy | PHO | TUS | SGS | MMR | POR | EVG | I70 | LVL | BRI | MLW | CNS | HPT | IRP; 11 | FLM | RCH; 31 | MAR | NWS | SON | MMR | PHO | | | | | | | | 64th | 200 | |
| 1996 | Doran Racing | 77 | Chevy | HOM | PHO | POR | EVG | TUS | CNS; 25 | HPT | BRI | NZH | MLW | LVL | I70 | IRP | FLM | GLN | NSV | RCH | NHA | MAR | NWS | SON | MMR | PHO | LVS | | | | 111th | 88 | |
| 1997 | Doran Racing | 71 | Chevy | WDW | TUS | HOM | PHO | POR | EVG | I70 | NHA | TEX | BRI | NZH | MLW | LVL | CNS | HPT | IRP; DNQ | FLM | NSV | GLN | RCH | MAR | SON | MMR | CAL | PHO | LVS | | NA | - | |
| 1998 | Doran Racing | 77 | Chevy | WDW | HOM | PHO | POR | EVG | I70 | GLN | TEX | BRI | MLW | NZH | CAL | PPR | IRP; 25 | NHA | FLM | NSV | HPT | LVL | RCH | MEM | GTY | MAR | SON | MMR | PHO | LVS | 94th | 88 | |
| 2008 | Tatman Racing | 37 | Chevy | DAY | CAL | ATL | MAR | KAN | CLT | MFD; 28 | DOV | TEX | MCH | MLW | MEM | KEN | IRP | NSH | BRI | GTW | NHA | LVS | TAL | MAR | ATL | TEX | PHO | HOM | | | 116th | 0^{1} | |

^{*} Season still in progress
^{1} Ineligible for series points
