= Snowball Derby =

Annual stock car race

- Venue: Five Flags Speedway
- Location: Pensacola, Florida
- First race: 1968
- Distance: 150 Miles
- Laps: 300
- Most wins (driver): Rich Bickle (5)

Circuit information
- Surface: Asphalt
- Length: 0.5 mi (0.80 km)
- Turns: 4

The Snowball Derby is a 300-lap super late model stock car race held annually at the Five Flags Speedway, a half-mile paved oval track in Pensacola, Florida.

The race has been contested every year since 1968 and is typically run on the first Sunday in December, although in some years it has been run on the second Sunday.

Stephen Nasse is the defending winner, having won it in 2025.

== History ==
The Snowball Derby has a reputation for attracting some of the bigger names in short track racing, including top series NASCAR drivers. For example, the 2009 event was won by NASCAR driver Kyle Busch, and also featured Steve Wallace, Bobby Gill, Chase Elliott, Matt Kenseth's son Ross Kenseth, David Stremme, and Cale Gale. The popularity of the race forced NASCAR to move their annual national series prizegiving banquet in 2017 to a date as to not conflict with the Snowball Derby.

Because of the "all-star" nature of the race, the Snowball Derby is considered by many to be the most prestigious race in super late model racing. Though most drivers entering the race are from nearby states, some drivers travel across the United States to compete, mainly because of the posted awards and super late model rules, which are very similar to each other regardless of track or tours (the United Super Late Model Rules Alliance).

The Snowball Derby has been won by past and future stars of NASCAR, including five national series champions (one Cup Series, two who won both a Cup and Xfinity Series championship, two Truck Series, total ten national championships), five Cup Series, two Xfinity Series, and seven Truck Series race winners. Tammy Jo Kirk became the first female winner of the race in 1994 which led to her becoming a future NASCAR competitor. Johanna Long would become the second female driver to win the Snowball Derby in 2010. From 2011 until 2014, the Snowball was won by teenage drivers who have since won in NASCAR's national series. In the 2010s, only two drivers (2015, 2019) were in their 20's and one driver (2017) was in their 30's.

Over the years, the race format has varied between 100 laps, 200 laps, and a unique 300 laps plus additional laps equalling the number of runnings of this race. The format has settled into a straight 300 lap event, though a late yellow flag can create a green–white–checkered finish that extends the race beyond 300 laps.

The Snowball Derby is an independent event, meaning that it is not officially sanctioned (for a fee) by a racing organization. However, it is associated with both the United Super Late Model Rules Alliance and the Southern Super Series, a series of Super Late Model races in the region including Five Flags Speedway, with officials from that series, most notably Ricky Brooks as chief steward, officiating the race. Most Super Late Model races are run with the USLMRA package, regardless of tracks or regional series (although the track requires Continental AG tires, while some tracks may use American Racer or Goodyear), various series will encourage drivers to attend the event (PASS North and South, Southern Super Series, ARCA JEG'S/CRA, Spears Southwest). In the past the Snowball was sanctioned by Bob Harmon's All Pro organization, and for one year by NASCAR when it acquired All Pro.

== Snowflake 125 ==
The Allen Turner Snowflake 125 is a 125-lap pro late model race held the Saturday before the Snowball Derby. Held since 1999, notable winners include multi-year winners Kyle Busch, Erik Jones, and Chase Elliott. Other notable NASCAR winners are Darrell Waltrip, Donnie Allison, Noah Gragson and John Hunter Nemechek. Originally 100 laps, the race went to 100 green flag laps in 2007 (eliminating all safety car laps from the count), and increased to 125 laps in 2025.

Keelan Harvick, son of Kevin Harvick, is the youngest winner of the event and the latest winner of the event, having won it in 2025.

== Snowball Derby 75 ==
The Snowball Derby 75 is a 75-lap modified race held since 2018.

== Past Snowball Derby winners ==
Year	Date	Driver	Race Distance		Ref
Year	Date	Driver	Laps	Miles	Ref
1968	December 15	Wayne Niedecken Sr.	300	150 (241.4 km)	
1969	December 14	Friday Hassler	300	150 (241.4 km)	—
1970	December 6	Wayne Niedecken Sr. (2)	300	150 (241.4 km)	—
1971	December 5	Dickie Davis	300	150 (241.4 km)	—
1972	December 3	Ed Howe	300	150 (241.4 km)	—
1973	December 2	Dickie Davis (2)	300	150 (241.4 km)	—
1974	December 8	Pete Hamilton	300	150 (241.4 km)	—
1975	December 7	Donnie Allison	300	150 (241.4 km)	—
1976	December 5	Darrell Waltrip	300	150 (241.4 km)	—
1977	December 4	Ronnie Sanders	300	150 (241.4 km)	—
1978	December 3	Dave Mader III	300	150 (241.4 km)	—
1979	December 2	Freddy Fryar	300	150 (241.4 km)	—
1980	December 7	Gary Balough	300	150 (241.4 km)	—
1981	December 6	Freddy Fryar (2)	300	150 (241.4 km)	—
1982	December 5	Gene Morgan	300	150 (241.4 km)	—
1983	December 14	Mickey Gibbs	300	150 (241.4 km)	—
1984	December 9	Butch Lindley	300	150 (241.4 km)	—
1985	December 8	Jody Ridley	300	150 (241.4 km)	—
1986	December 7	Gary Balough	300	150 (241.4 km)	—
1987	December 6	Butch Miller	300	150 (241.4 km)	—
1988	December 4	Ted Musgrave	300	150 (241.4 km)	—
1989	December 3	Rick Crawford	300	150 (241.4 km)	—
1990	December 2	Rich Bickle	300	150 (241.4 km)	—
1991	December 8	Rich Bickle (2)	300	150 (241.4 km)	—
1992	December 6	Gary St. Amant	300	150 (241.4 km)	
1993	December 5	Bobby Gill	300	150 (241.4 km)	
1994	December 4	Tammy Jo Kirk	300	150 (241.4 km)	
1995	December 3	Jeff Purvis	300	150 (241.4 km)	
1996	December 8	Rich Bickle (3)	300	150 (241.4 km)	
1997	December 7	Bobby Gill	300	150 (241.4 km)	
1998	December 6	Rich Bickle (4)	300	150 (241.4 km)	
1999	December 5	Rich Bickle (5)	300	150 (241.4 km)	
2000	December 3	Gary St. Amant (2)	300	150 (241.4 km)	
2001	December 2	Wayne Anderson	300	150 (241.4 km)	
2002	December 8	Ricky Turner	300	150 (241.4 km)	
2003	December 7	Charlie Bradberry	300	150 (241.4 km)	
2004	December 11	Steve Wallace	300	150 (241.4 km)	
2005	December 4	Eddie Mercer	300	150 (241.4 km)	
2006	December 3	Clay Rogers	300	150 (241.4 km)	
2007	December 2	Augie Grill	300	150 (241.4 km)	
2008	December 7	Augie Grill (2)	300	150 (241.4 km)	
2009	December 6	Kyle Busch	300	150 (241.4 km)	
2010	December 5	Johanna Long	300	150 (241.4 km)	
2011	December 4	Chase Elliott	300	150 (241.4 km)	
2012	December 2	Erik Jones	300	150 (241.4 km)	
2013	December 8	Erik Jones (2)	300	150 (241.4 km)	
2014	December 7	John Hunter Nemechek	300	150 (241.4 km)	
2015	December 6	Chase Elliott (2)	300	150 (241.4 km)	
2016	December 6	Christian Eckes	300	150 (241.4 km)	
2017	December 3	Kyle Busch (2)	300	150 (241.4 km)	
2018	December 2	Noah Gragson	300	150 (241.4 km)	
2019	December 9	Travis Braden	300	150 (241.4 km)	
2020	December 6	Ty Majeski	300	150 (241.4 km)	
2021	December 5	Chandler Smith	300	150 (241.4 km)	
2022	December 4	Derek Thorn	300	150 (241.4 km)	
2023	December 3	Ty Majeski (2)	300	150 (241.4 km)	
2024	December 8	Kaden Honeycutt	300	150 (241.4 km)	
2025	December 7 (raced on December 8)	Stephen Nasse	300	150 (241.4 km)	—

=== Multiple winners (drivers) ===
# Wins	Driver	Years won
5	Rich Bickle	1990, 1991, 1996, 1998, 1999
2	Wayne Niedecken	1968, 1970
2	Freddy Fryar	1979, 1981
2	Augie Grill	2007, 2008
2	Chase Elliott	2011, 2015
2	Kyle Busch	2009, 2017
2	Dickie Davis	1971, 1973
2	Erik Jones	2012, 2013
2	Bobby Gill	1993, 1997
2	Gary St. Amant	1992, 2000
2	Gary Balough	1980, 1986
2	Ty Majeski	2020, 2023
