= Freddy Fryar =

American racing driver (1935–2020)

- Born: February 15, 1935; Chattanooga, Tennessee, U.S.
- Died: April 29, 2020 (aged 85)
- Achievements: 1979, 1981 Snowball Derby winner 1964 Florida Governor's Cup

NASCAR Cup Series career
- 6 races run over 5 years
- Best finish: 68th (1970)
- First race: 1956 Race No. 45 (Montgomery)
- Last race: 1971 Daytona 500 (Daytona)
Wins	Top tens	Poles
0	1	0

Freddy Fryar (February 15, 1935 – April 29, 2020) was an American stock car racing driver. He competed in the NASCAR Grand National and Winston Cup Series between 1956 and 1971.

== Career summary ==
Born in Chattanooga, Tennessee, Fryar made his first start in NASCAR Grand National (now Cup Series) competition in 1956.

Known as "the Beaumont Flyer", Fryar participated in 772 laps of racing; equivalent to 1,371.1 miles (2,206.6 km) of racing. His average start position was 27th, while his average finish position was 21st. Fryar's total career earnings were $5,310 ($44,022.49 when adjusted for inflation).

Fryar was also a regular participant of the Snowball Derby, winning the event in 1979 and 1981. During the 1980s, Fryar was seen frequently racing at various races taking place at the Mobile International Speedway in Irvington, Alabama. Fryar's sponsor was Buster Davis throughout his career. Most of Fryar's races were during the 1970s (three races) as opposed to the 1960s (one race) and the 1950s (two races). Fryar eddy also raced cars owned and sponsored by A. J. Fasulo, who owned a body shop in Beaumont, Texas, from the early 1970s for almost 15 years. He raced at Houston's Meyer Speedway, Five Flags Speedway in Pensacola, Florida, and other places all over the United States. He was named NASCAR's Most Popular Driver in 1968.

A winner of 826 races, Fryar worked as a driving instructor at the Richard Petty Driving Experience following his retirement; he was inducted in to the Alabama Auto Racing Pioneers Hall of Fame in 2012, and the Ozarks Auto Racing Hall of Fame in 2013.

Fryar died on April 29, 2020, due to complications from leukemia, at the age of 85.

Achievements
Preceded by Gary Balough	Snowball Derby Winner; 1981	Succeeded by Gene Morgan
Preceded by Dave Mader III	Snowball Derby Winner; 1979	Succeeded by Gary Balough
