= Winchester 400 =

Stock car race

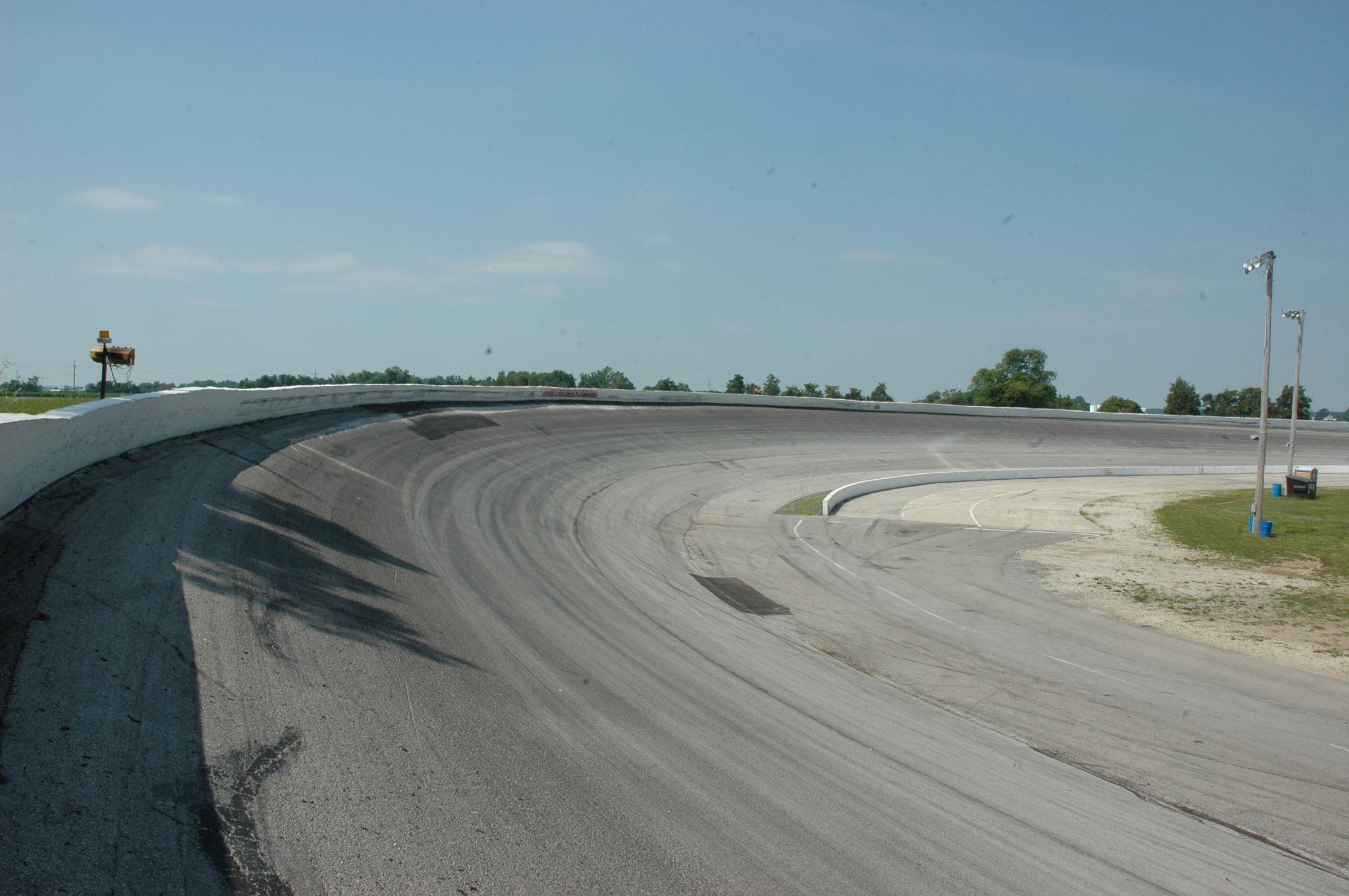
Looking backwards at Turn 2

The Winchester 400 is a 400-lap short-track super late model stock car race held each fall at the Winchester Speedway, a half-mile long paved oval motor racetrack in Winchester, Indiana, United States. Held annually since 1970, the Winchester 400 started off as an American Speed Association event. Later it became part of the NASCAR Southeast Series from 1992 to 1998. It returned to the ASA National Tour from 2000 to 2002. The event is sanctioned by the ARCA/CRA Super Series since 2003, and in 2023 it will be co-sanctioned by the new ASA STARS National Tour.

Billed as the "World's Fastest 1/2 mile", Winchester's 37 degree banking are some of the steepest in motorsports and the reason for the high speeds. The track has permanent seating for approximately 4000 spectators. The race has served as a launching point for the careers of several young drivers including former winners Rusty Wallace, Mark Martin, Mike Eddy, Ted Musgrave, Chase Elliott, and Carson Hocevar.

== History ==
Year	Date	Winner	Make	Pole	Make
1970	October 4	Dave Sorg	Mercury	Ron North	Oldsmobile
1971	October 3	Denny Miles	Chevrolet	Les Snow	Plymouth
1972	October 1	Dave Sorg	Chevrolet	Larry Moore	Chevrolet
1973	September 30	Vern Schrock	Pontiac	Ed VanderLaan	Chevrolet
1974	September 29	Bob Senneker	Chevrolet	Vern Schrock	Chevrolet
1975	September 28	Bob Senneker	Chevrolet	Larry Moore	Chevrolet
1976	October 4	Bob Senneker	Chevrolet	Bob Senneker	Chevrolet
1977	October 2	Bob Senneker	Chevrolet	Bob Senneker	Chevrolet
1978	October 1	Bob Senneker	Chevrolet	Bob Sensiba	Chevrolet
1979	October 7	Don Gregory	Oldsmobile	Randy Sweet	Chevrolet
1980	October 5	Terry Senneker	Chevrolet	Mark Martin	Chevrolet
1981	October 4	Mike Eddy	Chevrolet	Mark Martin	Chevrolet
1982	October 3	Rusty Wallace	Chevrolet	Bob Strait	Pontiac
1983	October 2	Mike Eddy	Pontiac	Dick Trickle	Pontiac
1984	September 30	Bob Senneker	Pontiac	Dick Trickle	Pontiac
1985	September 29	Mark Martin	Ford	Mark Martin	Ford
1986	October 5	Mark Martin	Ford	Mark Martin	Pontiac
1987	October 4	Butch Miller	Chevrolet	Butch Miller	Chevrolet
1988	October 2	Ted Musgrave	Chevrolet	Butch Miller	Chevrolet
1989	October 1	Butch Miller	Chevrolet	Kenny Wallace	Pontiac
1990	September 30	Bob Senneker	Chevrolet	Dave Jackson	Chevrolet
1991	October 6	Glenn Allen Jr.	Chevrolet	Mike Eddy	Pontiac
1992	October 4	Tim Steele	Chevrolet	Mike Garvey	Ford
1993	October 3	Mike Cope	Oldsmobile	Hal Goodson	Ford
1994	October 2	Mike Cope	Oldsmobile	Toby Porter	Oldsmobile
1995	October 1	Mike Cope	Chevrolet	Ron Barfield Jr.	Ford
1996	September 29	Scot Walters	Chevrolet	Wayne Anderson	Chevrolet
1997	September 28	Hank Parker Jr.	Chevrolet	Nipper Alsup	Chevrolet
1998	September 27	Derrick Gilchrist	Chevrolet	Jeff Fultz	Chevrolet
1999	September 26	Brian Ross	Chevrolet	Matt Hagans	Ford
2000	October 1	Gary St. Amant	Chevrolet	Larry Foyt	Pontiac
2001	September 23	Joey Clanton	Chevrolet	David Stremme	Ford
2002	October 6	Gary St. Amant	Chevrolet	David Stremme	Chevrolet
2003	October 5	Bobby Parsley	Chevrolet	Dave Jackson	Chevrolet
2004	not held				
2005	not held				
2006	October 15	Scott Hantz	Chevrolet	Danny Jackson	
2007	October 14	Ryan Lawler	Ford	Ryan Lawler	Ford
2008	October 12	David Stremme	Dodge	Chris Gabehart	
2009	October 18	Kyle Busch	Toyota	Chris Gabehart	
2010	October 17	Chase Elliott	Ford	Johnny VanDoorn	
2011	October 15	Boris Jurkovic	Toyota	Derrick Griffin	Toyota
2012	October 14	Ross Kenseth	Ford	Rick Turner	Ford
2013	October 13	Erik Jones	Toyota	Chase Elliott	Chevrolet
2014	October 12	Erik Jones	Toyota	Erik Jones	Toyota
2015	October 11	Erik Jones	Toyota	Terry Fisher Jr.	Chevrolet
2016	October 9	Travis Braden	Chevrolet	Brandon Oakley	Toyota
2017	October 8	Noah Gragson	Toyota	Cole Rouse	Toyota
2018	October 14	Jeff Choquette	Chevrolet	Chandler Smith	Toyota
2019	October 13	Stephen Nasse	Chevrolet	Travis Braden	Toyota
2020	October 11	Carson Hocevar	Chevrolet	Cayden Lapcevich	Chevrolet
2021	October 12	Sammy Smith	Toyota	Corey Heim	Toyota
2022	October 16	Stephen Nasse	Toyota	Casey Roderick	Toyota
2023	October 15	Gio Ruggiero	Toyota	Cole Butcher	Toyota
2024	October 13	Cole Butcher	Toyota	Casey Roderick	Chevrolet
2025	October 12	Ty Majeski	Ford	Ty Majeski	Ford
2026	October 10	Carson Brown	Chevrolet	Dawson Sutton	Chevrolet

Reference (for 1970 - 2013 winners):
