= Winchester Speedway =

Motorsport track in the United States

"World's Fastest 1/2 Mile"
- Location: 2656 W State Road 32; Winchester, Indiana
- Coordinates: 40°10′31″N 85°1′37″W
- Capacity: 5,000
- Owner: Charlie Shaw
- Broke ground: 1914
- Opened: 1916
- Former names: Funk's Speedway (1914–1951)
- Major events: Current: ARCA/CRA Super Series; Winchester 400 (1970–2003, 2006–present); Former: ARCA Menards Series; Calypso Lemonade 200 (1982–1983, 1988, 1990, 1993–2003, 2006–2007, 2011–2017, 2020–2021); CARS Tour (2001–2003, 2009); ASA National Tour (2000–2002); NASCAR Southeast Series (1992–1998); NASCAR Grand National Series (1950)
- Website: www.winchesterinspeedway.com

Oval (1952–present)
- Surface: Asphalt
- Length: 0.500 mi (0.805 km)
- Turns: 4
- Banking: 37°

Clay oval (1916–1952)
- Surface: Clay
- Length: 0.500 mi (0.805 km)
- Turns: 4
- Banking: 45°

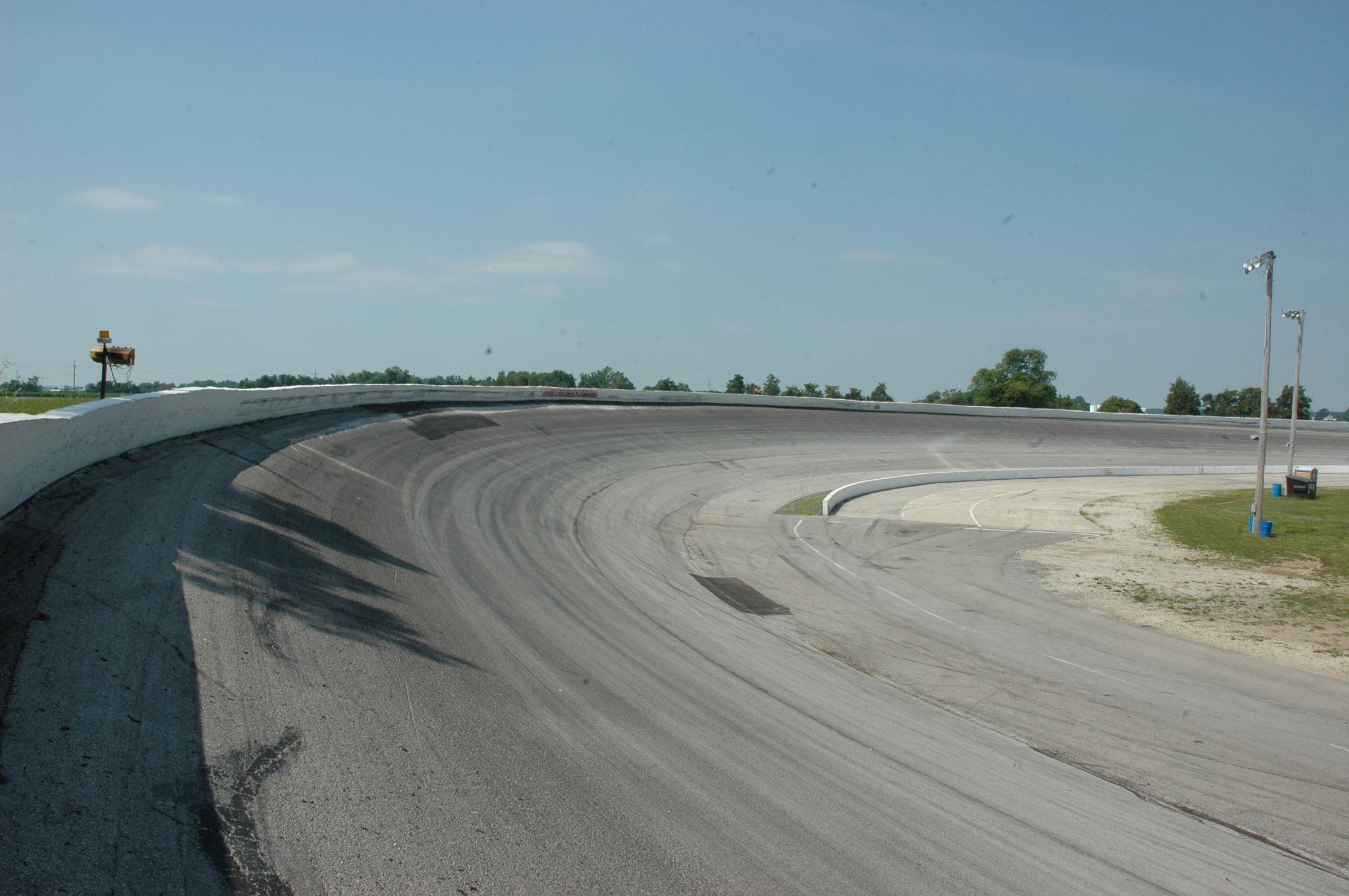
Looking backwards at Turn 2

Winchester Speedway is a 0.500 mi (0.805 km) paved oval motor racetrack in White River Township, Randolph County, just outside Winchester, Indiana, approximately 90 miles (144.8 km) northeast of Indianapolis. It seats 5,000 spectators. It is also known as the "World's Fastest 1/2 mile".

The track's 37-degree banking is one of the steepest in motorsports, and the highest-banked active racetrack in the country. Notable drivers that raced at Winchester include Rusty Wallace, Mark Martin, Jeff Gordon, Tony Stewart, Ryan Newman, Sarah Fisher, Chase Briscoe and William "Billy" Hutson.

== Funk's Speedway ==
The original half-mile clay oval was built in a cornfield by Frank Funk in 1914, and the track opened in 1916 with the name of Funk's Speedway. As owner and operator, Funk pursued a two-pronged strategy to attract spectators. First, he recognized that attendance went up as the clay banks were raised higher and higher, reaching 25 feet by 1932, and the turns were said to be banked at 45° in 1948. In 1932, the track could seat 6,000 in the grandstands, with the grounds accommodating 12,000 to 14,000.

Second, Funk tested various treatments to reduce dust and increase traction for the drivers. He started with mineral oil, then branched out into various other substances, which would result in a track "not only relatively dust-free but pavement fast." This work brought the attention of highway engineers, who made the track a proving ground for roadbuilding technology.

== Winchester Speedway ==
NASCAR Cup Series held a race at Winchester in 1950, and Lloyd Moore won the race.

The track's signature event is the Winchester 400, an annual 400-lap super late model stock car race, currently sanctioned by the ARCA/CRA Super Series. Former winners during the first 36 editions include: Bob Senneker (7 wins), Mike Cope (3), Mike Eddy (2), Mark Martin (2), Gary St. Amant (2), Butch Miller, Rusty Wallace, Ted Musgrave, Glenn Allen Jr., Tim Steele, Scot Walters, and Hank Parker Jr. The venue regularly hosts additional ARCA/CRA Super Series races every year since its inception in 1997.

The track has hosted numerous USAC midget, sprint and USAC Silver Crown races. Since 1991, the event is titled the Rich Vogler Classic. A second round was held in 2005 and 2006 under the title Kenny Irwin Memorial.

The track has hosted the ARCA Menards Series Winchester ARCA 200 since 1982 with some interruptions.

NASCAR Southeast Series ran 7 races at the speedway between 1992 through 1998.

ASA National Tour had 3 races at the facility, between 2000 and 2002. Also USAR Pro Cup Series ran 6 races at Winchester between 2001 and 2009.

== Gallery ==
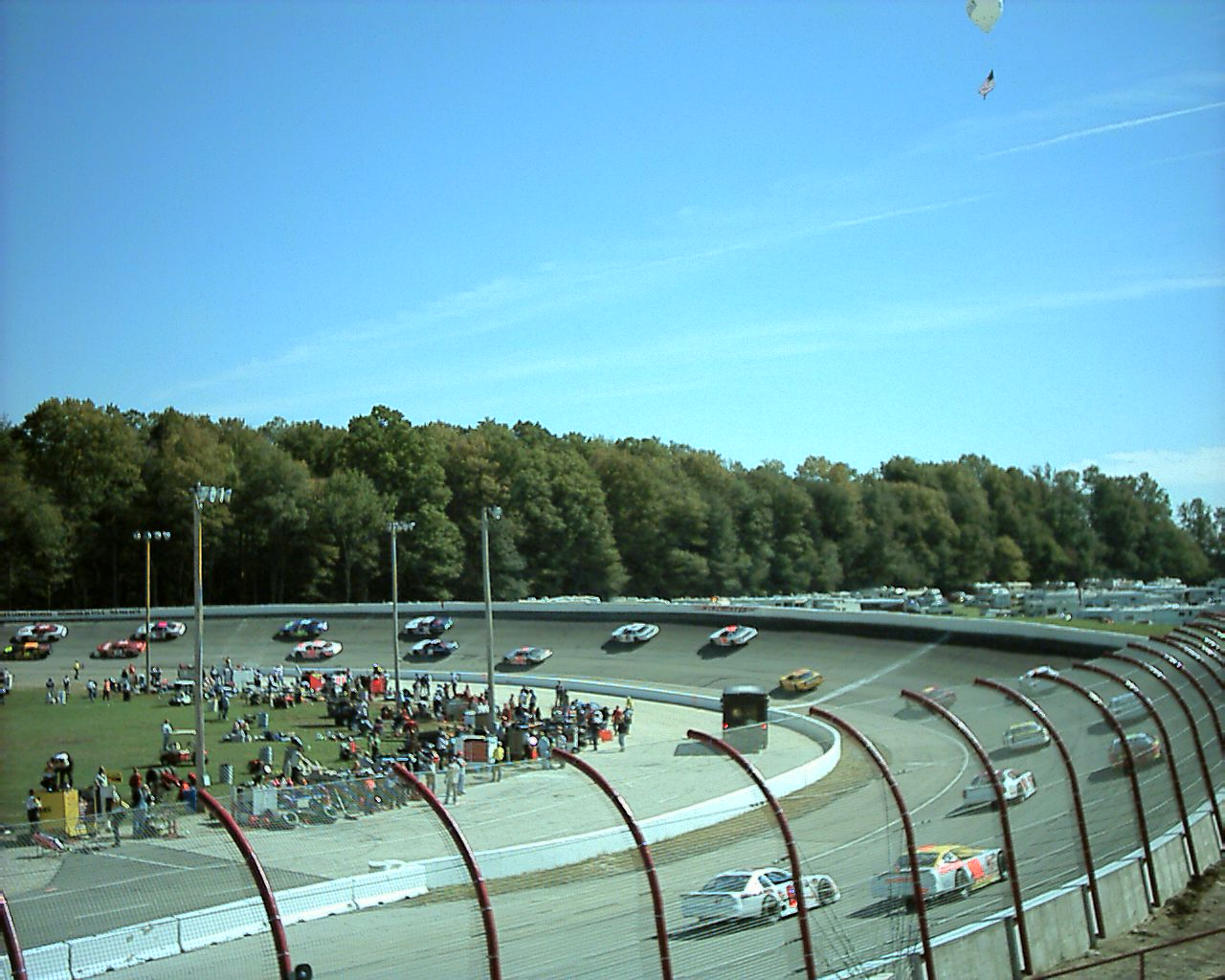
ASA race at Winchester Speedway in 2003; heading into turn 1

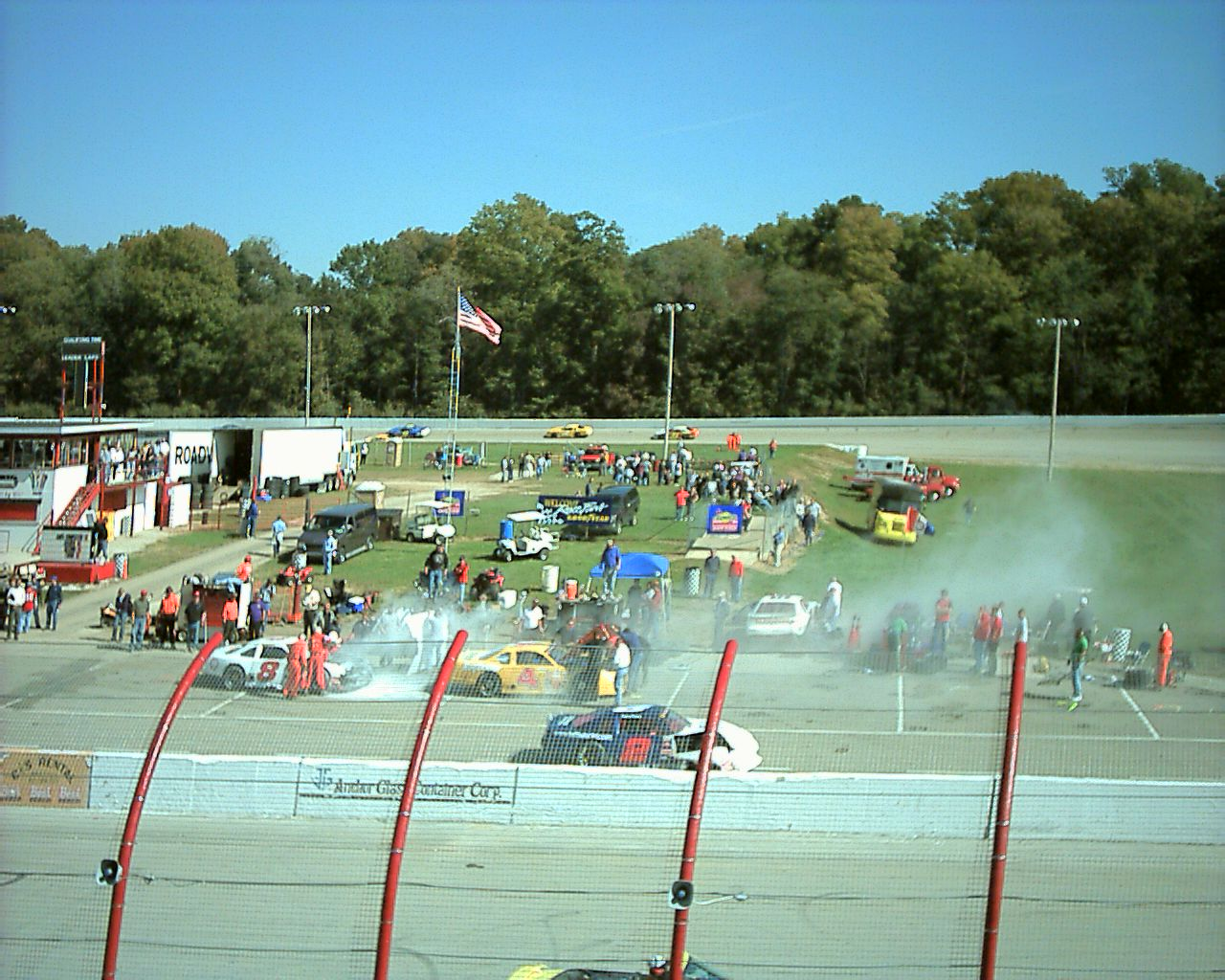
Winchester Speedway after a crash

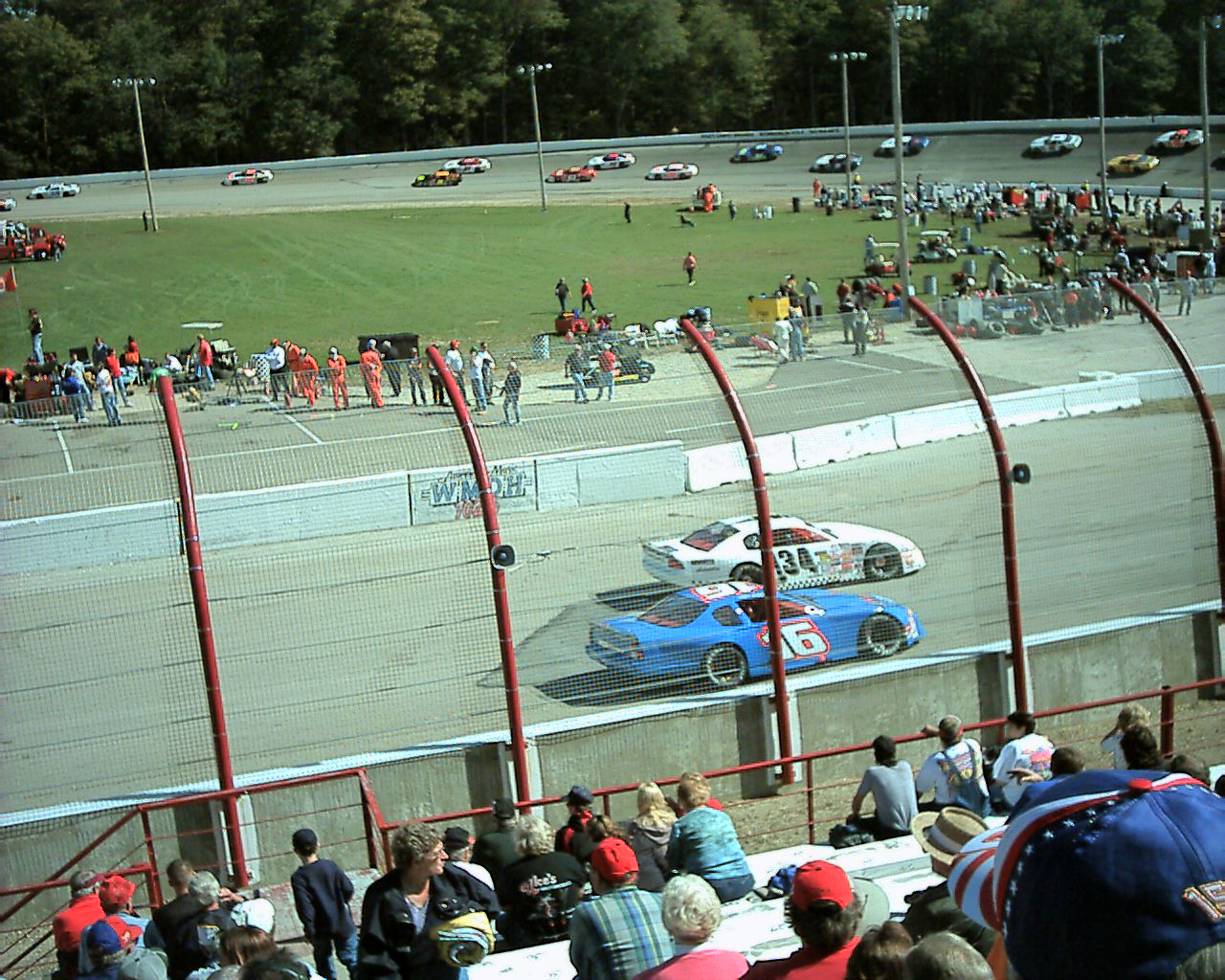
ASA race at Winchester Speedway in 2003; front stretch

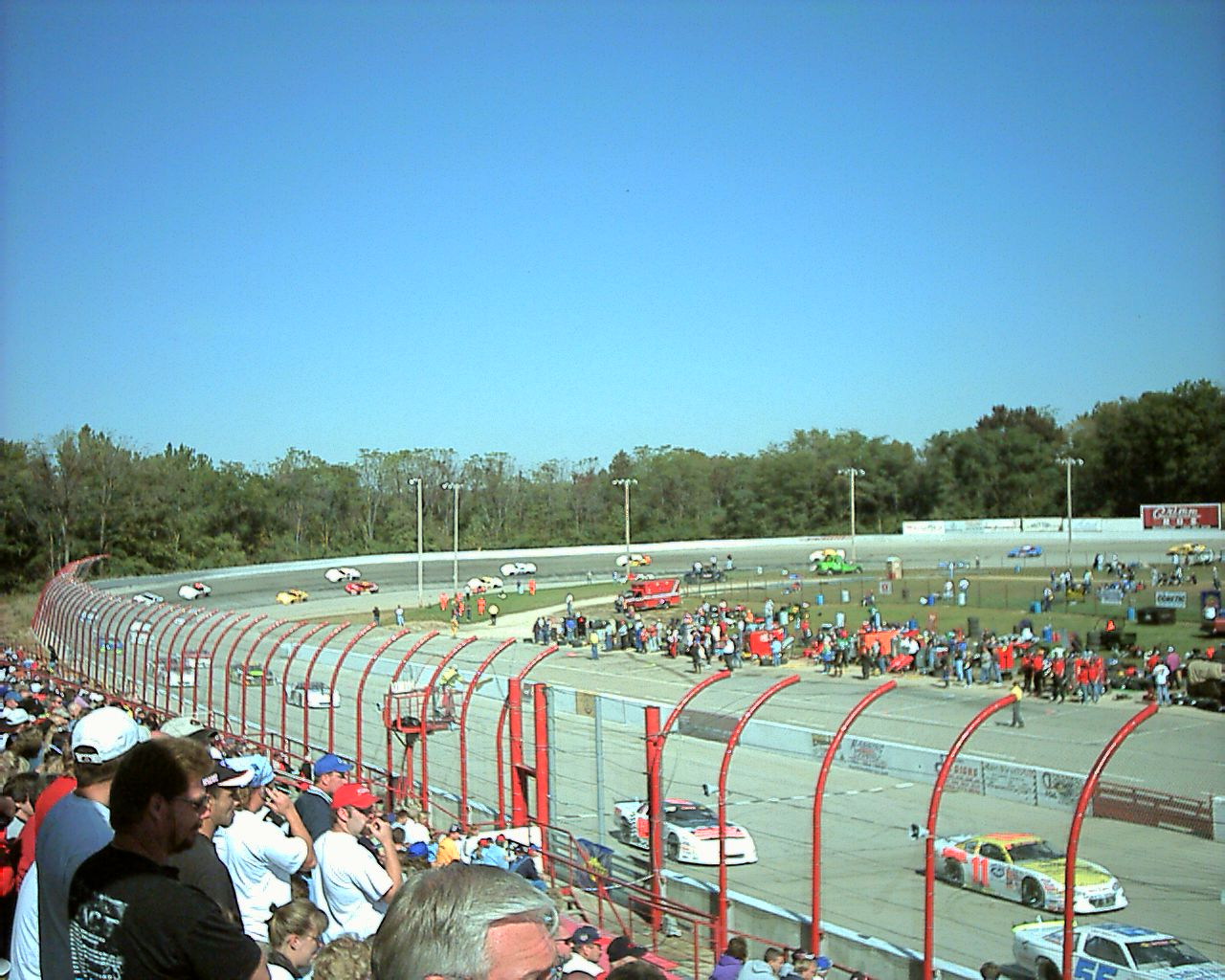
ASA race at Winchester Speedway in 2003; turn 4 and front stretch
