= CRA Super Series =

- Category: Stock car racing
- Country: United States
- Inaugural season: 1997
- Drivers: 59
- Engine suppliers: Chevrolet; Dodge; Ford; Toyota
- Drivers' champion: Chase Burda
- Makes' champion: Ford
- Teams' champion: Brandon Oakley Racecars
- Official website: http://cra-racing.com/

The ASA/CRA Super Series is a super late model stock car racing series owned and operated by the American Speed Association. It is a touring series based in the Midwestern United States, which competes at paved short ovals. It was formerly known as the Kendall Late Model Series and the Sunoco Super Series.

The series utilizes super late model chassis race cars. Regulations on engine and body are based on the United Super Late Model Rules Alliance using an Approved Body Configuration legal body, with 358 cubic inch engines. Car body designs are based on the Holden Commodore (VF) (2014-17), Chevrolet Camaro, Dodge Charger, Ford Fusion, and the Toyota Camry.

Most races are 100-125 laps long, except the Winchester 400 at Winchester Speedway, the Redbud 400 at Anderson Speedway, the Berlin 251 at Berlin Raceway, and the SpeedFest 200 at Watermelon Capital Speedway.

The CRA Super Series is based out of Indiana, but in the past few years has been expanding its series to visit a variety of racetracks from Michigan to Florida. CRA started a partnership with the ARCA Racing Series presented by Menards at the start of the 2012 season. In 2023, the ASA bought out the CRA sanctioning body along with the Midwest Tour and partnered with the Southern Super Series to bring back the ASA National Tour. All 4 series run co-sanctoned races throughout the year along with standalone races.

The winningest driver in CRA Super Series history is Scott Hantz, with 31 career wins. He also shares the record with Johnny VanDoorn for the most series championships with 3 each.

Two women have won a CRA Super Series race, with Kenzie Ruston (now NASCAR Craftsman Truck Series driver Daniel Hemric's wife) winning at Lucas Oil Raceway in 2012 (the same year her future husband won the series championship) and Ali Kern at Kalamazoo Speedway in 2015.

== 2026 ASA/CRA Super Series Schedule ==
Date	Track	Location	Winner
April 26	Dominion Raceway	Woodford, Virginia	
June 6	Flat Rock Speedway	Flat Rock, Michigan	
August 26	Owosso Speedway	Ovid, Michigan	
September 19	Toledo Speedway	Toledo, Ohio	
October 11	Winchester Speedway	Winchester, Indiana	
November 8	Nashville Fairgrounds Speedway	Nashville, Tennessee	
November 15	New Smyrna Speedway	New Smyrna, Florida	

== Rookies of the Year ==
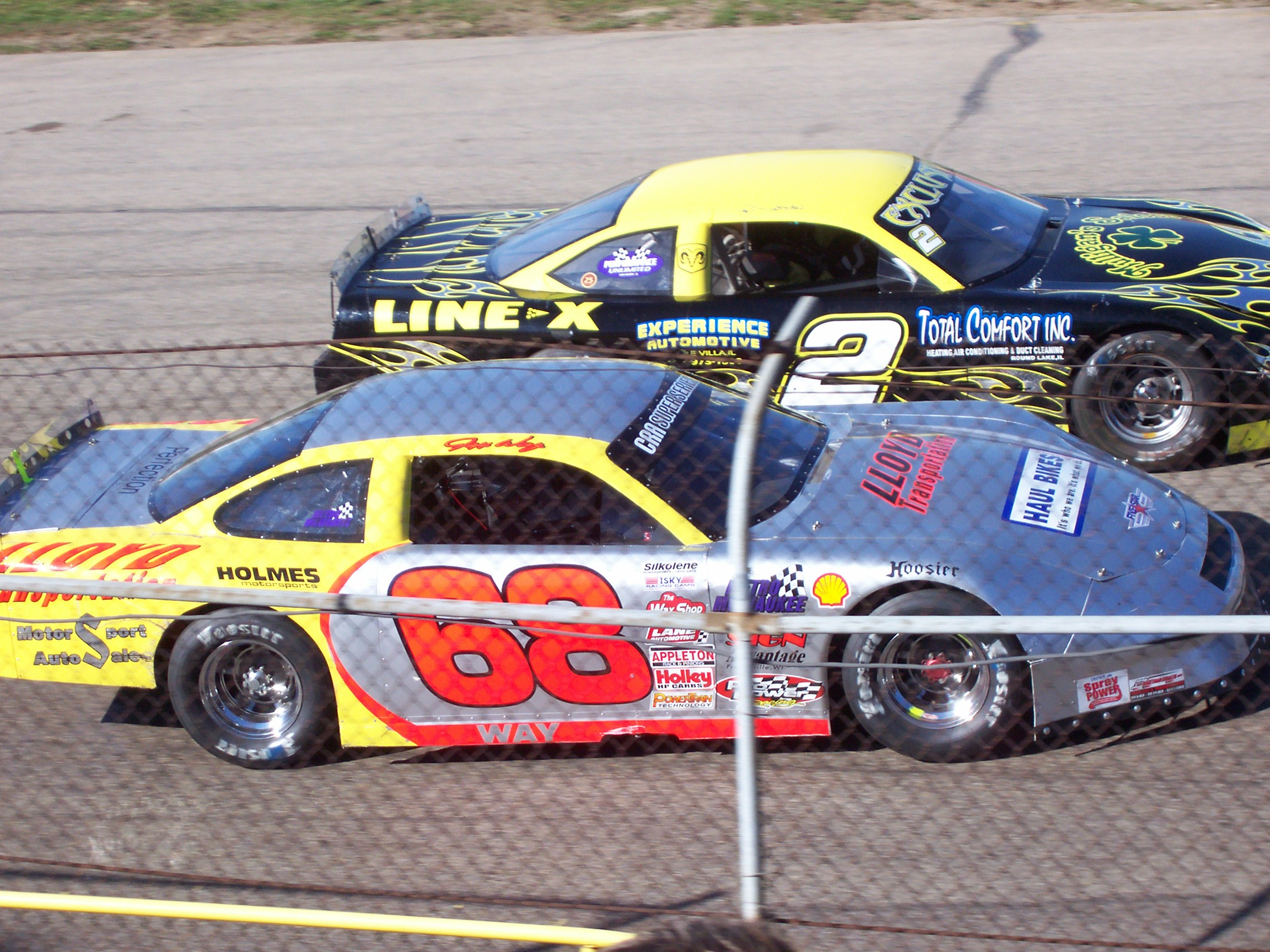
2006 CRA Late model (foreground)

- 2022 Billy Van Meter
- 2020 Jaren Crabtree
- 2019 Jake Dossey III
- 2018 Austin Kunert
- 2017 Logan Runyon
- 2016 Dalton Armstrong
- 2015 Grant Quinlan
- 2014 West Griffith, Jr.
- 2013 Ali Kern
- 2012 Travis Braden
- 2011 Derrick Griffin
- 2010 Nick Gullatta
- 2009 Tyler Roahrig
- 2008 Aaron Pierce
- 2007 Johnny Van Doorn
- 2006 Danny Jackson
- 2005 Tommy St. John
- 2004 Chris Gabehart
- 2003 Chuck Barnes, Jr.
- 2002 Andy Ponstein
- 2001 Joel Kauffman
- 2000 Scott Hantz
- 1999 Peter Cozzolino
- 1998 Spanks Overbeck

== ASA/CRA Super Series Champions (1997–present) ==
Year	Super Series
1997	Kenny Tweedy
1998	Brian Rievely
1999	Brian Ross
2000	Scott Hantz
2001	Brian Ross (2)
2002	Joel Kauffman
2003	Bobby Parsley
2004	Chuck Barnes Jr
2005	Jeff Lane
2006	Scott Hantz (2)
2007	Chris Gabehart
2008	Scott Hantz (3)
2009	Johnny VanDoorn
2010	Johnny VanDoorn (2)
2011	Derrick Griffin
2012	Johnny VanDoorn (3)
2013	Travis Braden
2014	Travis Braden (2)
2015	Grant Quinlan
2016	Cody Coughlin
2017	Logan Runyon
2018	Josh Brock
2019	Greg Van Alst
2020	Josh Brock (2)
2021	Hunter Jack
2022	Eddie Van Meter
2023	Gio Ruggiero
2024	Chase Burda

== Racetracks ==
The most frequent CRA racetracks have been:

Track	Town	State	Races
Anderson Speedway	Anderson	Indiana	74
Angola Motorsport Speedway	Angola	Indiana	16
Baer Field Speedway	Fort Wayne	Indiana	19
Berlin Raceway	Marne	Michigan	24
Columbus Motor Speedway	Obetz	Ohio	11
Flat Rock Speedway	Flat Rock	Michigan	8
Indianapolis Raceway Park	Brownsburg	Indiana	32
Illiana Motor Speedway	Schererville	Indiana	8
Kalamazoo Speedway	Kalamazoo	Michigan	9
Nashville Fairgrounds Speedway	Nashville	Tennessee	18
Plymouth Motor Speedway	Plymouth	Indiana	8
Salem Speedway	Salem	Indiana	24
Shady Bowl Speedway	DeGraff	Ohio	7
Toledo Speedway	Toledo	Ohio	26
Winchester Speedway	Winchester	Indiana	55

The series has visited several other racetracks, including Bristol Motor Speedway and North Wilkesboro Speedway.

== See also ==
- CRA
- ACT
- CARS Tour
- PASS
- SRL Southwest Tour
- Winchester 400
