= Lowell Bennett =

American stock car racing driver

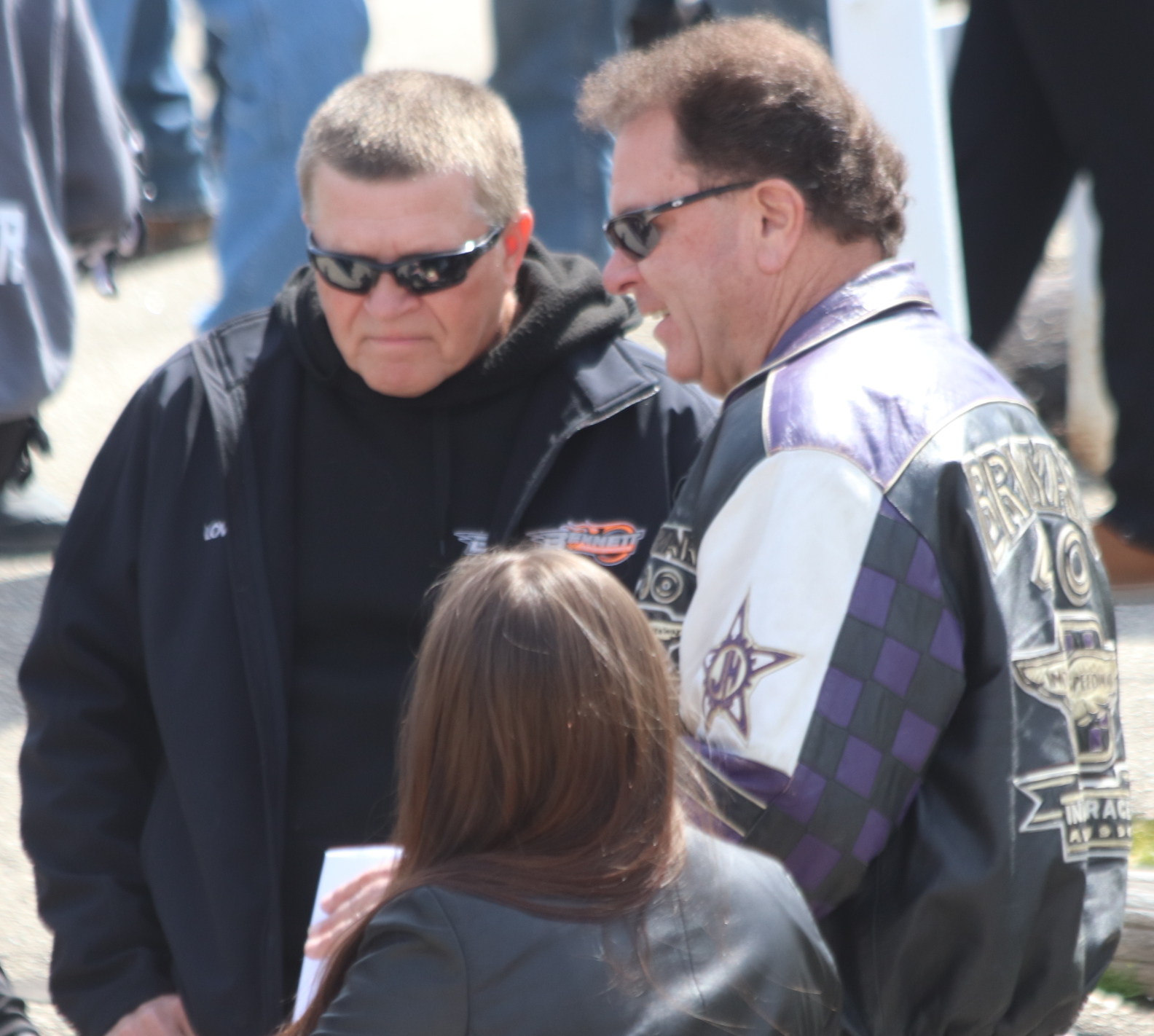
- Bennett (left) talking with Rich Bickle in 2019
- Born: May 14, 1958 (age 68); Germany
- Achievements: 1997, 2000, 2004, 2007, 2010 Slinger Nationals Winner

NASCAR O'Reilly Auto Parts Series career
- 7 races run over 3 years
- 2004 position: 118th
- Best finish: 80th (2002)
- First race: 2002 GNC Live Well 250 (Milwaukee)
- Last race: 2004 Emerson Radio 250 (Richmond)
Wins	Top tens	Poles
0	0	0
- Statistics up to date as of September 5, 2017.

Lowell Bennett (born May 14, 1958) is an American stock car racing driver. The Neenah, Wisconsin native has competed in the NASCAR Busch Series, the World Series of Asphalt, and has five Slinger Nationals championships. He continues to race in Wisconsin, primarily at Wisconsin International Raceway (WIR).

== Racing career ==
=== Early years ===
Bennett started racing on dirt, in a 1972 Chevrolet Chevelle bought from his father. The first track that he raced on was Shawano Speedway, just outside of Shawano, Wisconsin. Bennett's first year of racing was 1976; he won his first race at Shawano and it paid $80. In the following years, Bennett raced at Shawano, and in De Pere and Seymour, Wisconsin at dirt tracks. In 1981, he tried his hand at asphalt racing and raced at Shawano and Slinger Speedway, after winning a track championship at Shawano that year and one more year of double duty in 1982, Bennett decided to back down his schedule. He continued to race at local tracks through the end of the 1900s, eventually transitioning to the half-mile paved oval at Wisconsin International Raceway. Bennett won his first Slinger Nationals title in 1997, then followed it up in 2000, 2004, 2007 and 2010 to come out with a total of five championships.

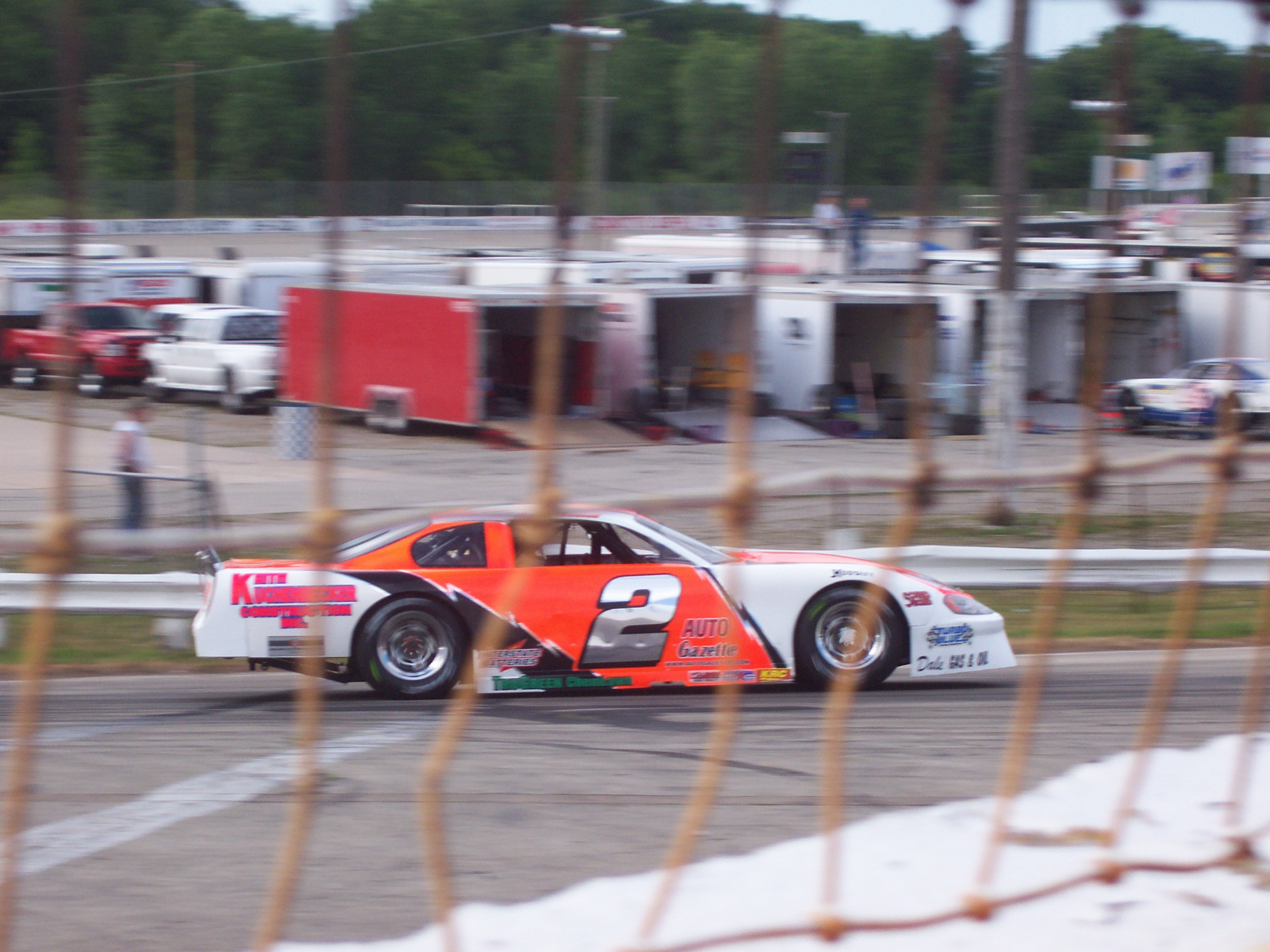
Bennett's super late model at Wisconsin International Raceway in 2006.

=== NASCAR ===
Running a self-funded team, Bennett ran seven total races in the NASCAR Busch Series (now the Xfinity Series). Three were in 2002, and two each in 2003 and 2004. He scored a best finish of 21st, at the Indianapolis Raceway Park in 2002.

=== Post-NASCAR ===
Bennett has continued to run at Wisconsin International Raceway and Slinger Speedway, winning the prestigious Red, White and Blue championship at the former and the Slinger Nationals at the latter. His son Braison now runs at WIR and other regional touring series as part of the 2017 Kulwicki Driver Development Program.

== Personal life ==
Bennett's father Bobby was a local late model driver who also served in the United States Army. Lowell was 1st of ten kids born in the family (hence the car number 2 as Bobby was #1, Lowell #2, and down the lines it went with all 6 boys in his racing family) and was born in Germany while his father was on tour.

== Motorsports career results ==
=== NASCAR ===
(key) (Bold – Pole position awarded by qualifying time. Italics – Pole position earned by points standings or practice time. * – Most laps led.)

==== Busch Series ====
NASCAR Busch Series results
Year	Team	No.	Make	1	2	3	4	5	6	7	8	9	10	11	12	13	14	15	16	17	18	19	20	21	22	23	24	25	26	27	28	29	30	31	32	33	34	NBSC	Pts	Ref
2002	Bennett Motorsports	02	Chevy	DAY	CAR	LVS	DAR	BRI	TEX	NSH	TAL	CAL	RCH	NHA	NZH	CLT	DOV	NSH	KEN	MLW; 41	DAY	CHI	GTY	PPR									MEM; 26	ATL	CAR	PHO	HOM	80th	225	
2002	Bennett Motorsports	22	Chevy																						IRP; 21	MCH	BRI	DAR	RCH	DOV	KAN	CLT						80th	225	
2003	Bennett Motorsports	02	Chevy	DAY	CAR	LVS	DAR	BRI	TEX	TAL	NSH	CAL	RCH	GTY	NZH	CLT	DOV	NSH	KEN	MLW; 28	DAY	CHI	NHA	PPR	IRP; 24	MCH	BRI	DAR	RCH	DOV	KAN	CLT	MEM	ATL	PHO	CAR	HOM	96th	170	
2004	Bennett Motorsports	82	Chevy	DAY	CAR	LVS	DAR	BRI	TEX	NSH	TAL	CAL	GTY	RCH	NZH	CLT	DOV	NSH	KEN	MLW	DAY	CHI	NHA	PPR	IRP; 36	MCH	BRI	CAL	RCH; 38	DOV	KAN	CLT	MEM	ATL	PHO	DAR	HOM	118th	104	
