= Scott Hansen (racing driver) =

American stock car racing driver

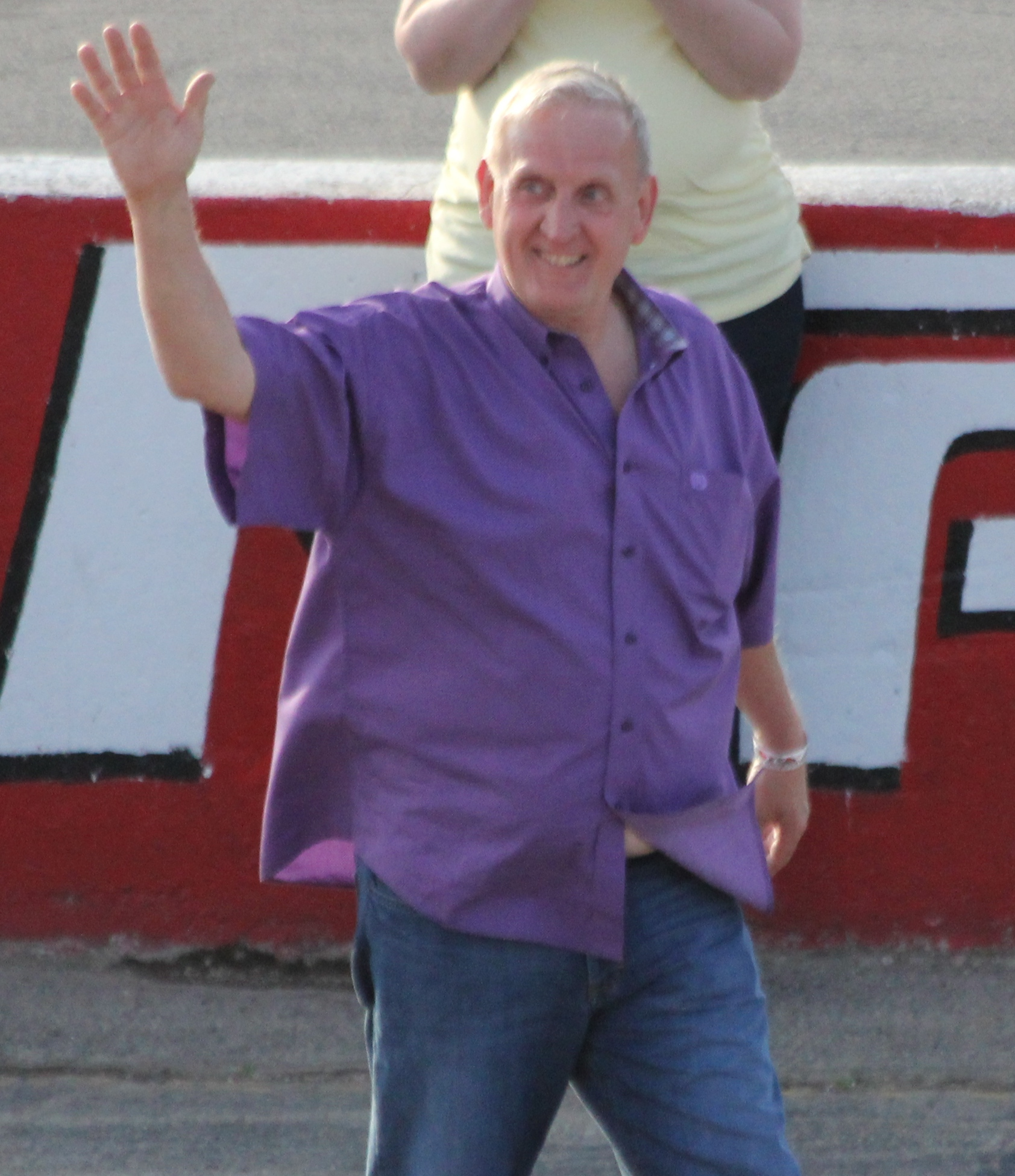
- Hansen waves to crowd at Wisconsin International Raceway in 2015
- Born: June 17, 1955 (age 71); Green Bay, Wisconsin, U.S.

NASCAR O'Reilly Auto Parts Series career
- 4 races run over 3 years
- Best finish: 95th (1999)
- First race: 1998 Carquest Auto Parts 250 (Gateway)
- Last race: 2001 Sam's Town 250 (Memphis)
Wins	Top tens	Poles
0	0	0

NASCAR FedEx Freight Truck Series career
- 28 races run over 2 years
- Best finish: 18th (1999)
- First race: 1998 DieHard 200 (Milwaukee)
- Last race: 1999 O'Reilly 300 (Texas)
Wins	Top tens	Poles
0	3	0
- Statistics up to date as of May 12, 2014.

Scott Hansen (born June 17, 1955) is an American stock car driver from Green Bay, Wisconsin. Now retired, Hansen primarily competed in the American Speed Association. He raced for several years in the NASCAR Craftsman Truck Series and Busch Series.

== Background ==
Hansen grew up in a racing family as his father Rollie Hansen was a race car driver and the flagman in the 1960s at the Brown County fairgrounds at De Pere, Wisconsin.

== Racing career ==
=== Local driver ===
Hansen won five late model track championships at the Wisconsin International Raceway between 1985 and 1989.

=== American Speed Association and ARTGO ===
Hansen moved to the American Speed Association (ASA) and ARTGO touring series and was the ASA series Rookie of the Year in 1989. He drove for Ken Schrader's ASA team. One ARTGO win was the 1994 National Short Track championship race at Rockford Speedway.

=== ARCA ===
Hansen also made two spot ARCA starts in 1991; he had a seventh-place finish at the first race at Daytona and 24th at Atlanta.

=== NASCAR Craftsman Truck Series ===
Hansen failed to qualify for a Phoenix NASCAR Craftsman Truck Series race in 1995 and Tucson race in 1997. He made his first truck start for Billy Ballew Motorsports at the Milwaukee Mile in 1998; he qualified eighth in finished 24th. Hansen's second start came a month later at Indianapolis Raceway Park (IRP) when he qualified 20th and finished 24th. He started the final two races that season (Phoenix and Las Vegas) and both ended with Did Not Finish's (DNF).

Hansen teamed up with Ken Schrader full-time for the 1999 season. He started the season with a seventh-place finish at Homestead-Miami Speedway. His second top ten finish was a tenth-place finish at Bristol Motor Speedway in the ninth race. Hansen's best career NASCAR finish came at the fifteenth race; he claimed the third place at Nazareth Speedway. Hansen parted from the team with one race left in the season; he finished eighteenth in the season points.

=== NASCAR Busch Series ===
Hansen started in first Busch Series race at Gateway Motorsports Park in 1998. Schrader earlier had Hansen qualify his Busch car at Milwaukee and he had qualified the car third fastest. Schrader and his co-owner Kenny Wallace needed a driver to race for Wallace after wildfires caused the Pepsi 400 Daytona race to be postponed. Schrader tapped his ASA driver; Hansen qualified 42nd and raced his way up to 16th - the first car one lap down. Hansen failed in his attempt to qualify the car for the following race at Rockingham Speedway.

Hansen raced in two Busch races in 1999, a 28th-place finish in his home track at Milwaukee and a 37th-place finish at IRP. He made his final NASCAR start in 2001 at Memphis International Raceway finishing 37th. He failed to qualify at Rockingham later that season.

== Motorsports career results ==
=== NASCAR ===
(key) (Bold – Pole position awarded by qualifying time. Italics – Pole position earned by points standings or practice time. * – Most laps led.)

==== Busch Series ====
NASCAR Busch Series results
Year	Team	No.	Make	1	2	3	4	5	6	7	8	9	10	11	12	13	14	15	16	17	18	19	20	21	22	23	24	25	26	27	28	29	30	31	32	33	NBGNC	Pts	Ref
1994	Ken Schrader Racing	52	Chevy	DAY	CAR	RCH	ATL	MAR	DAR	HCY	BRI	ROU	NHA	NZH	CLT	DOV	MYB	GLN	MLW; QL^{†}	SBO	TAL	HCY	IRP	MCH	BRI	DAR	RCH	DOV	CLT	MAR	CAR						N/A	0	
1998	Ken Schrader Racing	12	Chevy	DAY	CAR	LVS	NSV	DAR	BRI	TEX	HCY	TAL	NHA	NZH	CLT	DOV	RCH	PPR	GLN	MLW	MYB	CAL	SBO	IRP	MCH	BRI	DAR	RCH	DOV	CLT	GTY; 16						97th	115	
1998	Sasser Motorsports	09	Chevy																													CAR; DNQ	ATL	HOM			97th	115	
1999	LAR Motorsports	28	Chevy	DAY	CAR	LVS	ATL	DAR	TEX	NSV	BRI	TAL	CAL	NHA	RCH	NZH	CLT	DOV	SBO	GLN	MLW; 28	MYB	PPR	GTY													95th	131	
1999	Black Diamond Motorsports	62	Chevy																						IRP; 37	MCH	BRI	DAR	RCH	DOV	CLT	CAR	MEM	PHO	HOM		95th	131	
2000	Petty Enterprises	45	Chevy	DAY	CAR	LVS	ATL	DAR	BRI	TEX	NSV	TAL	CAL	RCH	NHA	CLT	DOV	SBO	MYB	GLN	MLW; QL^{‡}	NZH	PPR	GTY	IRP	MCH	BRI	DAR	RCH	DOV	CLT	CAR	MEM	PHO	HOM		N/A	0	
2001	Henderson Motorsports	75	Chevy	DAY	CAR	LVS	ATL	DAR	BRI	TEX	NSH	TAL	CAL	RCH	NHA	NZH	CLT	DOV	KEN	MLW	GLN	CHI	GTY	PPR	IRP	MCH	BRI	DAR	RCH	DOV	KAN	CLT	MEM; 37	PHO	CAR; DNQ	HOM	131st	52	
^{†} - Qualified for Ken Schrader. ^{‡} - Qualified for Kyle Petty.

==== Craftsman Truck Series ====
NASCAR Craftsman Truck Series results
Year	Team	No.	Make	1	2	3	4	5	6	7	8	9	10	11	12	13	14	15	16	17	18	19	20	21	22	23	24	25	26	27	NCTC	Pts	Ref
1995	Hansen Racing	53	Ford	PHO	TUS	SGS	MMR	POR	EVG	I70	LVL	BRI	MLW	CNS	HPT	IRP	FLM	RCH	MAR	NWS	SON	MMR	PHO; DNQ								103rd	3	
1997	Ken Schrader Racing	53	Chevy	WDW	TUS; DNQ	HOM	PHO	POR	EVG	I70	NHA	TEX	BRI	NZH	MLW	LVL	CNS	HPT	IRP	FLM	NSV	GLN	RCH	MAR	SON	MMR	CAL	PHO	LVS		138th	52	
1998	Billy Ballew Motorsports	15	Ford	WDW	HOM	PHO	POR	EVG	I70	GLN	TEX	BRI	MLW; 24	NZH	CAL	PPR															53rd	298	
1998	CSG Motorsports	57	Ford														IRP; 24	NHA	FLM	NSV	HPT	LVL	RCH	MEM	GTY	MAR	SON	MMR			53rd	298	
1998	Team Racing	11	Chevy																										PHO; 31	LVS; 39	53rd	298	
1999	Ken Schrader Racing	52	Chevy	HOM; 7	PHO; 16	EVG; 13	MMR; 18	MAR; 14	MEM; 15	PPR; 30	I70; 13	BRI; 10	TEX; 13	PIR; 15	GLN; 17	MLW; 31	NSV; 11	NZH; 3	MCH; 16	NHA; 27	IRP; 11	GTY; 24	HPT; 24	RCH; 14	LVS; 26	LVL; 16	TEX; 19	CAL			18th	2719	
