= Figure 8 racing =

Form of stock car racing

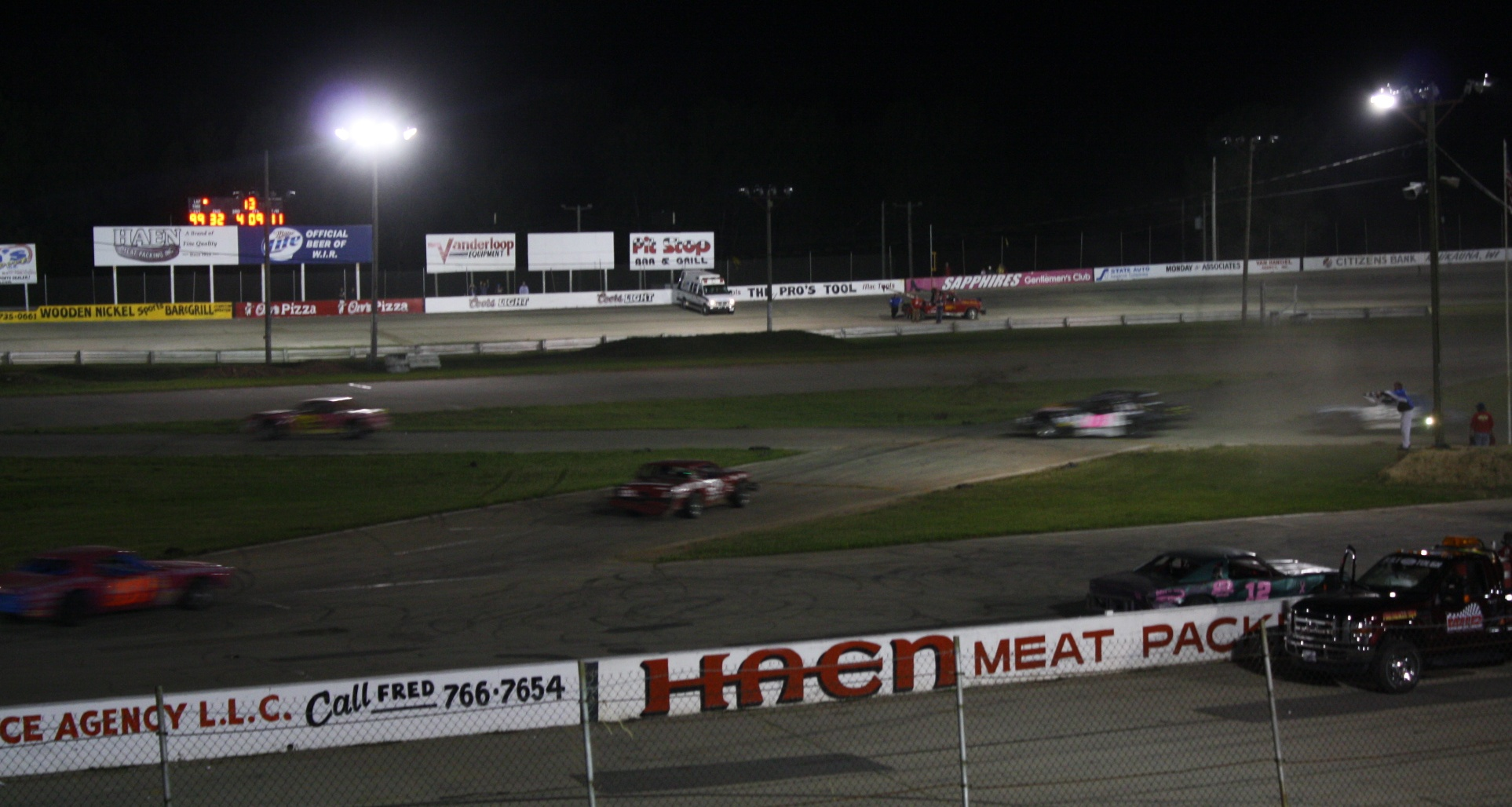
- A figure 8 race at Wisconsin International Raceway in 2009
- First played: Late 1940s

Characteristics
- Contact: Yes
- Type: Outdoor
- Venue: 8-shaped tracks and courses

Presence
- Country or region: United States, Canada

Figure 8 racing is a type of stock car racing in which automobiles race on an "8"-shaped track that purposely intersects itself, increasing the risk of collisions. Such contact between the participating vehicles, or at least the risk of such an occurrence, is an intentional part of the sport, with the intent being to damage them over the course of the race.

Figure 8 racing is most common and popular in the United States and Canada, and can be seen as the North American equivalent to the European motorsport of banger racing, which also uses modified derelict older-model cars in races where vehicle damage is an integral feature.

== Track ==
Racing is done on a track shaped like an "8". The cars cross paths at an intersection at the center of the "8", which is known as the "crossover" or the "X". Because of this layout, crashes are common. Figure 8 racing is a unique form of motorsport that requires strict attention to timing to successfully navigate the crossover. In Canada, figure 8 racing often takes place as a part of demolition derby events. Boundary lines are marked to form a figure 8 track, and barriers are installed to protect light poles, recovery vehicles, and safety cars.

== Vehicles ==
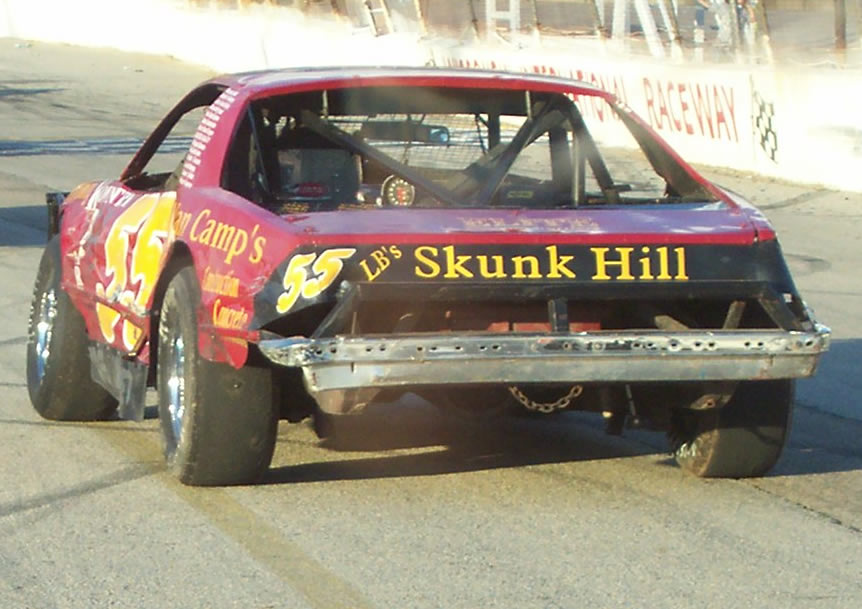
A typical figure 8 race car

The cars used are often stock cars that are modified for lightness and safety by removing the window glass and adding a roll cage. A large spoiler is sometimes placed on the roof to increase downforce. The cars' bodies are typically made out of sheet metal. All manner of vehicles have been used, ranging from older-model full-size sedans and muscle cars, to the aforementioned sprint car-like buggies, to school buses.

== History ==
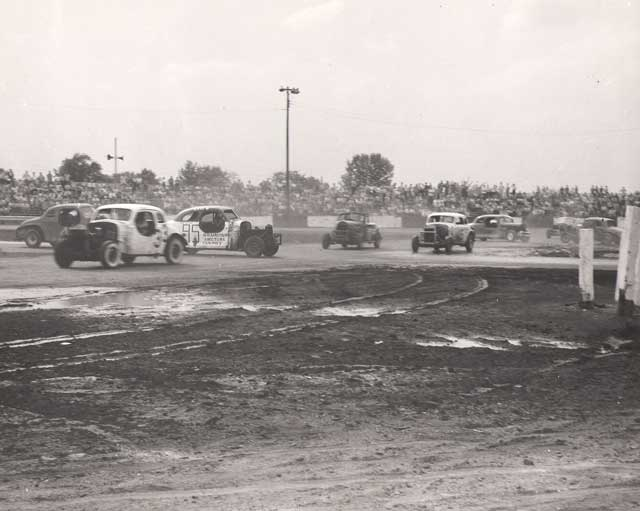
A figure 8 race at the Indianapolis Speedrome in the late 1940s

Figure 8 racing originated in the late 1940s. The first track to be considered a figure 8 track is unclear, but it may have had an overpass so that the cars did not cross each other's paths, instead simply being an "8"-shaped track. The first track where drivers crossed paths is believed to be the 1/5 mile-long Indianapolis Speedrome in Indianapolis, Indiana, which opened in 1941 but seems to have included a figure 8 track by the late 1940s. The sport received national publicity when it was frequently televised on ABC's Wide World of Sports in the 1960s, usually from Islip Speedway in Islip, New York.

== Championships ==
The Indianapolis Speedrome hosts the annual World Figure 8 race, which is considered the world championship event. The first three-hour endurance race was held in 1977.

The National Championship in the United States is held at Riverhead Raceway in Riverhead, New York.

== Notable figure 8 tracks ==
Many of these tracks have configurations that allow for both standard oval and figure 8 races.

- Altamont Raceway Park, Tracy, California (closed in 2008)
- Anderson Speedway, Anderson, Indiana
- Arizona State Fairgrounds, Phoenix, Arizona (yearly Grandstand event during the fair)
- Ascot Park, Gardena, California (Closed)
- Beech Bend Raceway Park, Bowling Green, Kentucky (Oval/Figure 8 Closed)
- Columbus Motor Speedway (Closed)
- Colorado National Speedway
- Evergreen Speedway
- Empire Expo Center
- Flat Rock Speedway
- Holland Speedway
- Indianapolis Speedrome
- Irwindale Speedway (Closed in 2024)
- Islip Speedway Islip, New York (Closed in 1984)
- Lake Erie Speedway
- Little Valley Speedway (Closed in 2017)
- Manzanita Speedway (Closed in 2009)
- Oxford Plains Speedway Oxford Plains, Maine
- Painesville Speedway Painesville, Ohio
- Raceway Park (Minnesota), Shakopee, Minnesota (Closed in 2013)
- Riverhead Raceway
- Riverside Park Speedway Agawam, Massachusetts (Closed in 1999)
- Rockford Speedway
- Seekonk Speedway
- Slinger Super Speedway
- Sportsdrome Speedway, Jeffersonville, Indiana (Added 2017)
- Toledo Speedway
- Wisconsin International Raceway

== Media ==
Figure 8 racing
Figure 8 racing at Wisconsin International Raceway — 3.3 MB
