= Slinger Speedway =

Racetrack

Coordinates: 43.340688°N 88.277534°W

World's Fastest 1/4 Mile Oval
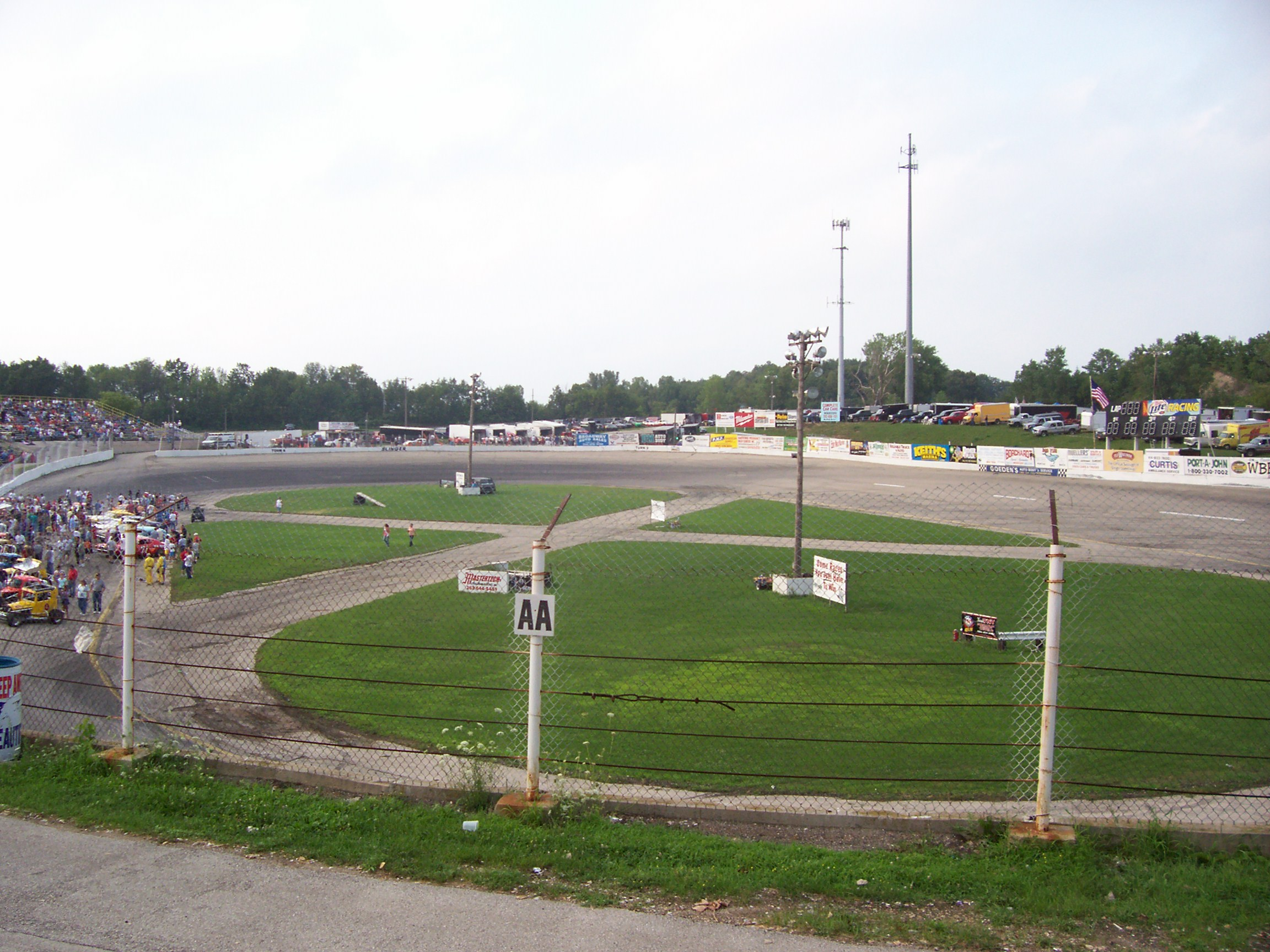
- Location: Slinger, Wisconsin
- Capacity: 10,000
- Owner: Travis Dassow & Kelsey Dassow
- Opened: 1948
- Major events: Current: Slinger Nationals; ASA STARS National Tour (2025)
- Website: https://slingersuperspeedway.com

Oval
- Surface: Asphalt
- Length: 0.25 mi (0.40 km)
- Turns: 4
- Banking: Turns: 33°
- Race lap record: 9.908 seconds (Jeff Bloom, 2010, Xtreme Sprint Series)

The Slinger Super Speedway (also known as Slinger Speedway) is a 1/4 mile paved oval automobile race track with 33-degree banked corners located in Slinger, Wisconsin. The track is billed as the "World's Fastest Quarter Mile Oval." The current track record was set by Jeff Bloom in a 410 extreme winged sprint car on August 21, 2010 at a time of 9.908 seconds. This is the first lap recorded under 10 seconds on a quarter mile oval track of any type, breaking Anderson Speedway's 10.28 second lap record. Bloom's lap eclipsed the track record set by USAC midget car driver Tracy Hines on May 17, 2008 at an elapsed time of 10.845 seconds. The lap was the fastest ever midget car lap on an asphalt quarter mile track. He eclipsed the long-standing mark of 11.095 seconds set by Tony Strupp's late model on June 12, 1994. Strupp's 31 year old record for Super Late models was broken by Steve Apel who ran the first ever sub 11 second super late model lap with a time of 10.994 on May 18, 2025

== Track history ==
The track opened in 1948 and continued with a clay surface through the 1973 season. When it opened for the 1974 season on June 2, track promoter Rollie Heder had the track converted from a flat 1/5 mile dirt track to a 1/4 mile high-banked asphalt track. The track hosted modified and sportsman classes on the new surface. At the end of July 21, 1974, the classes were switched to late models, sportsman, and road runner stocks. As the modified points leader, Larry Ninneman was named the track's modified champion. Joe Shear won two late model special races and another three of five regular season late model races to be named the track's 1974 late model champion over his teammate Dave Watson. Watson won the 1975 late model championship. The track had a paved "X" infield added in the late 1970s, allowing for figure 8 racing at the end of the weekly Sunday night race events. In 2021, track owner Todd Thelen brought the then all-new Superstar Racing Experience (SRX series) to Slinger Speedway. The July 10, 2021 race was won by Marco Andretti. It was the first time in the track's history that an event was broadcast live on national television (on CBS).

== Weekly divisions ==
There are seven divisions running for points in a weekly program:

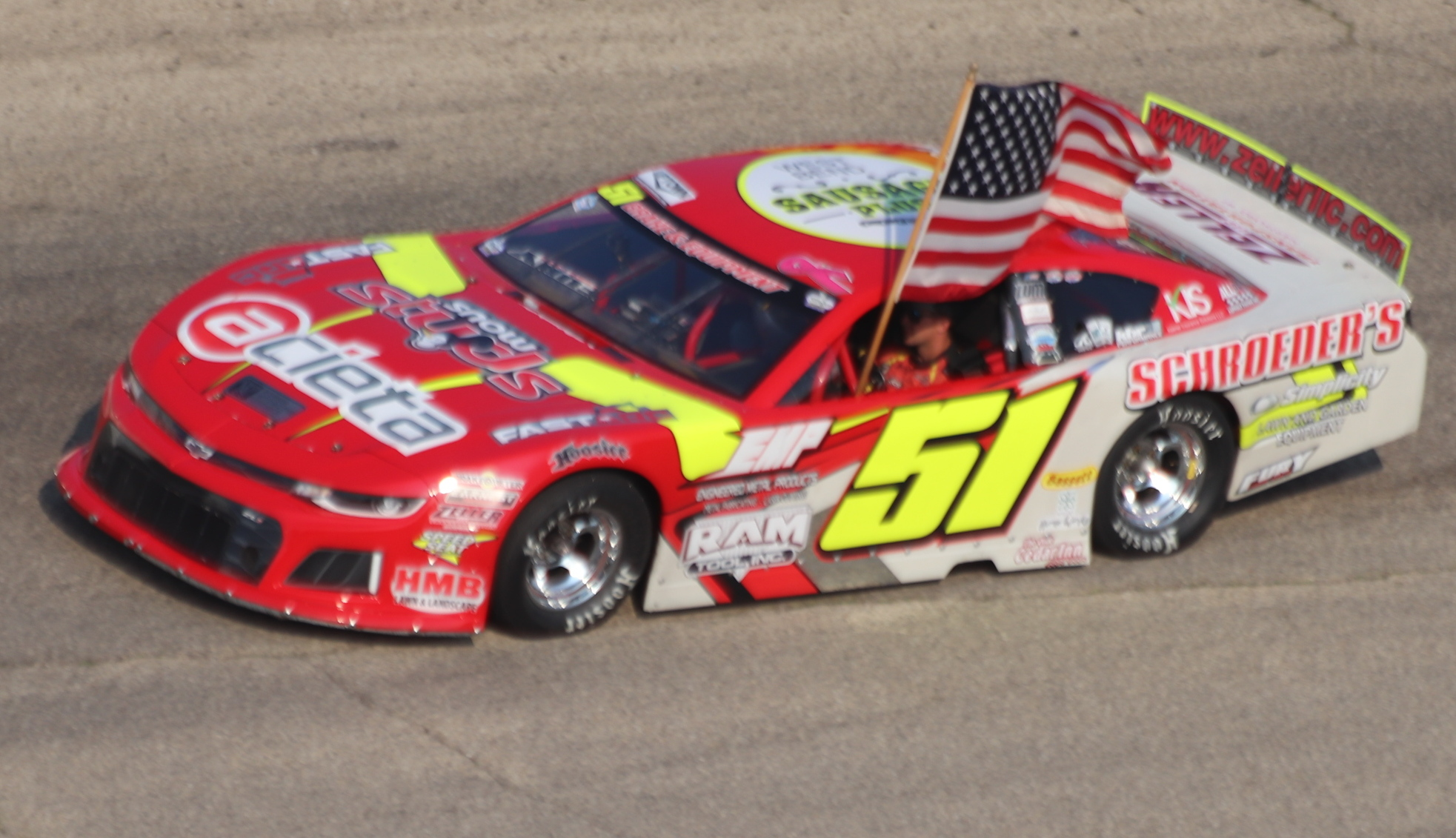
Super Late Model (2019)

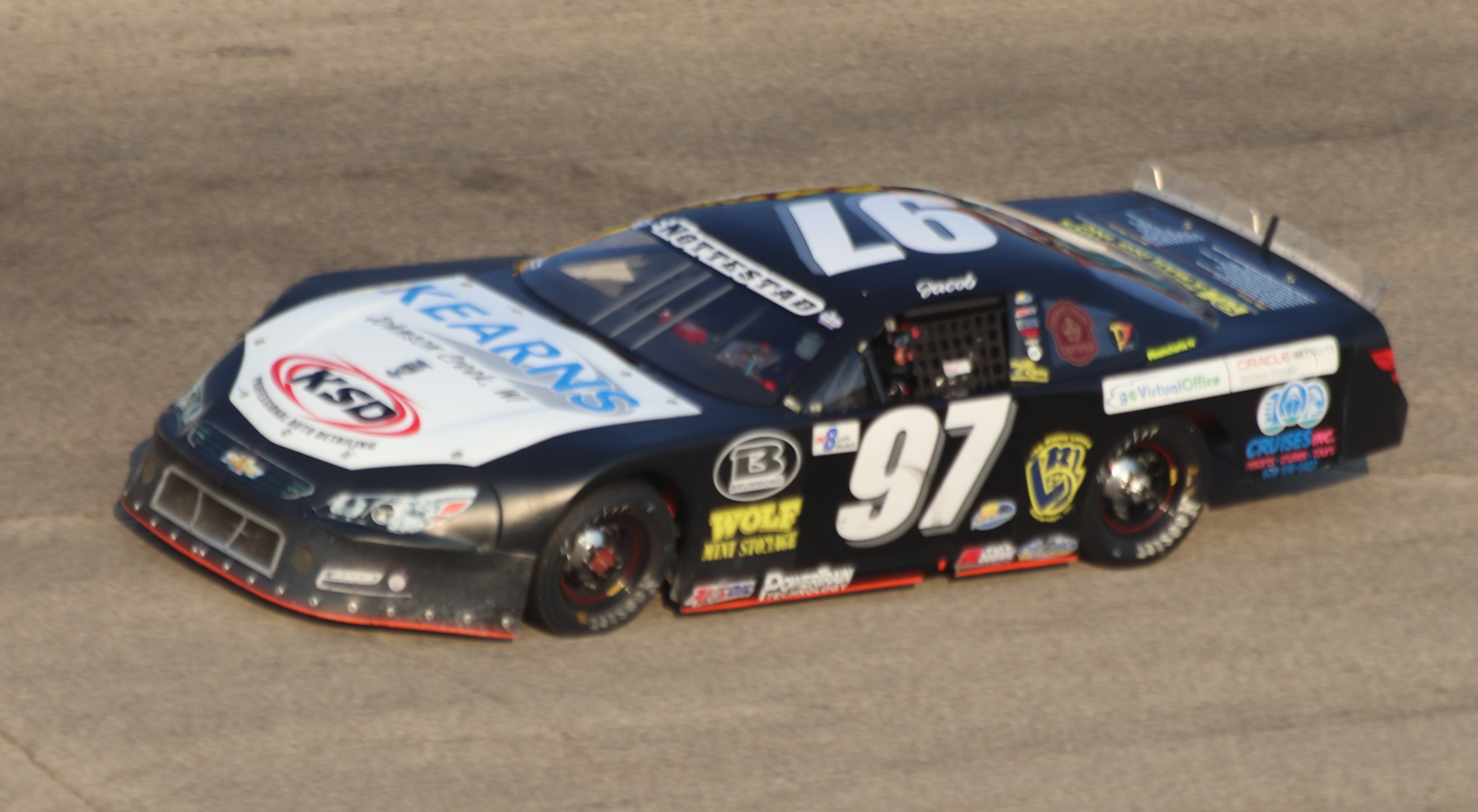
Late model (2019)

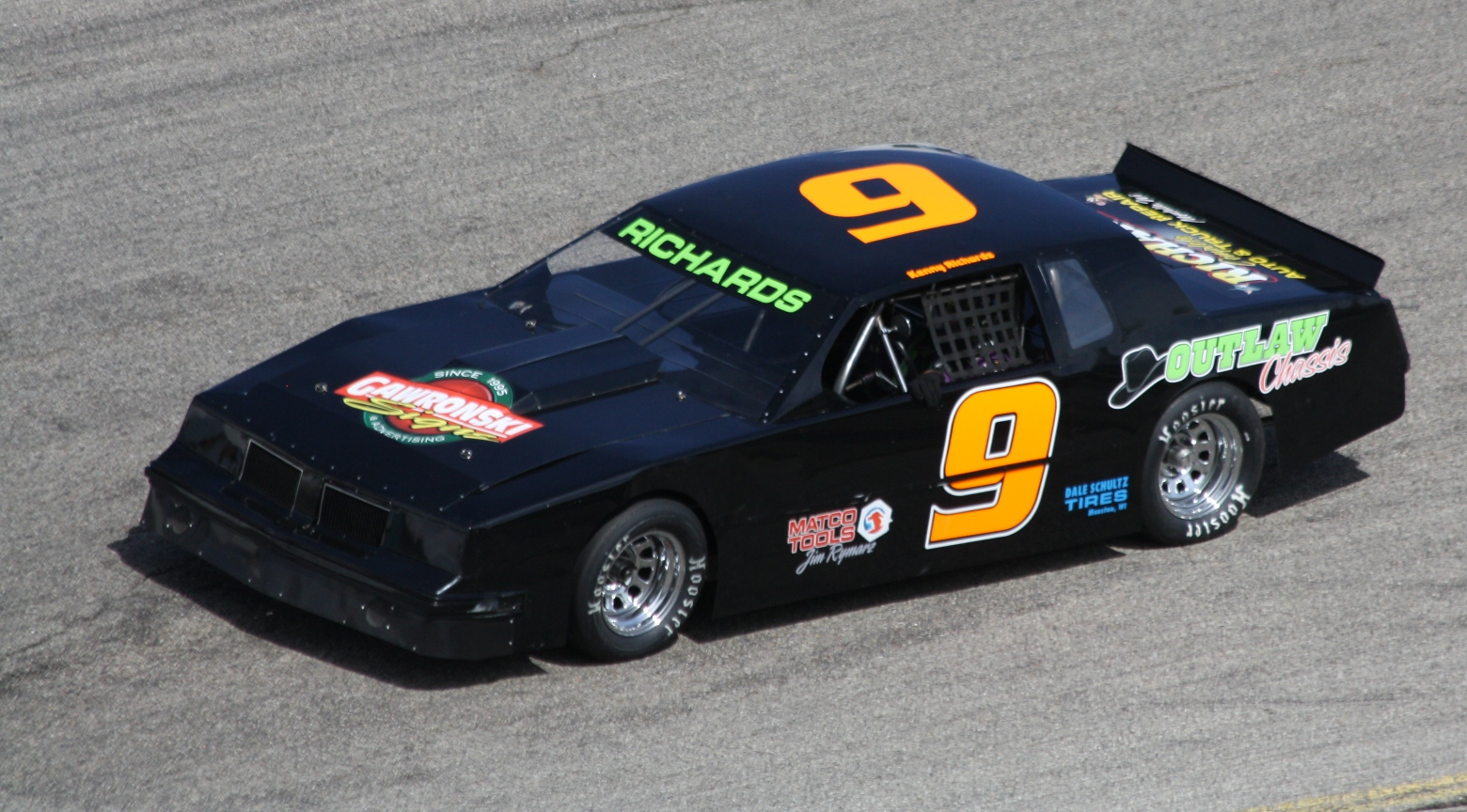
Sportsman (2013 Bill Prietzel)

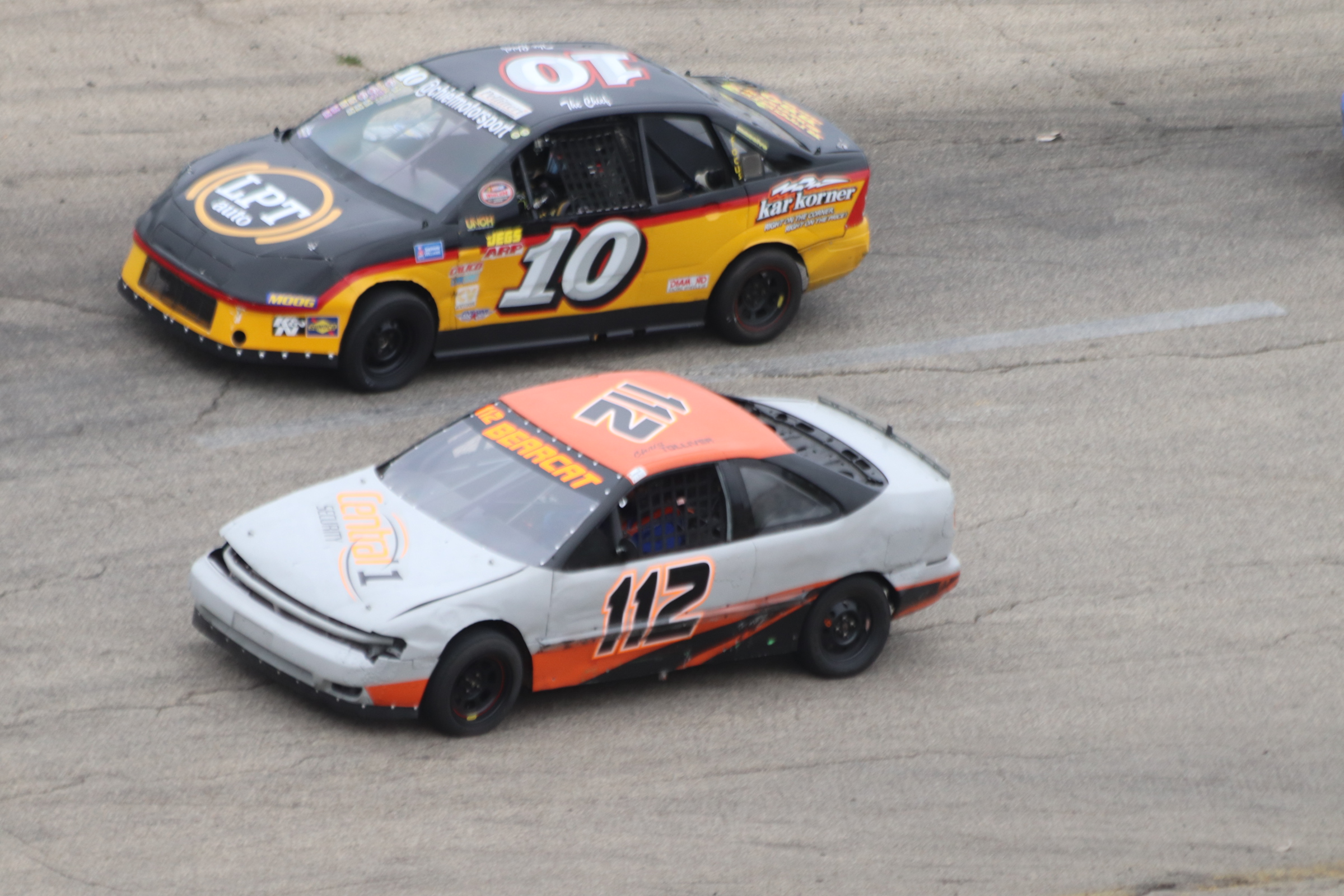
Slinger Bees (2019) - 4-cylinder cars

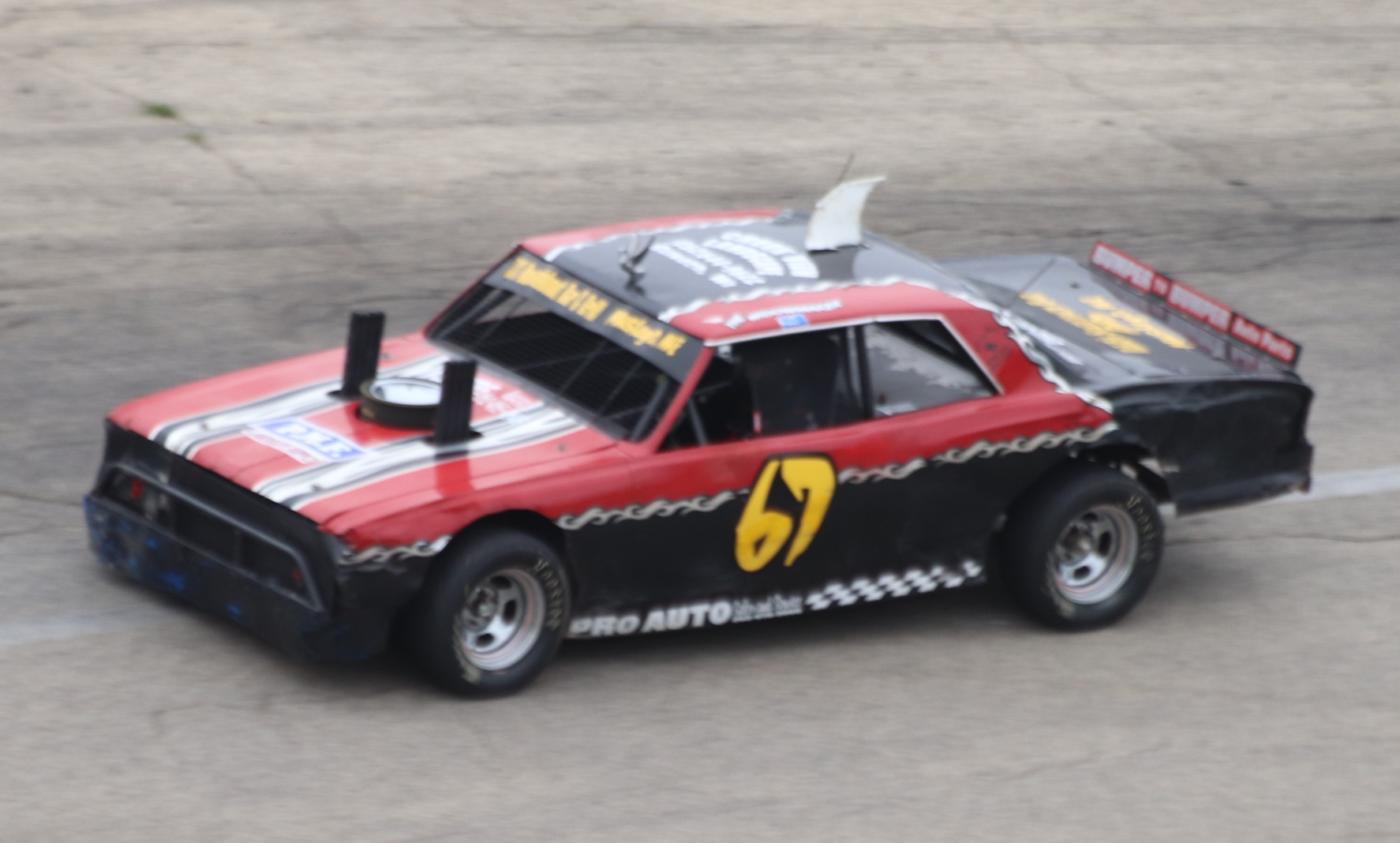
Figure 8 (2019)

== Notable drivers to appear at the track ==
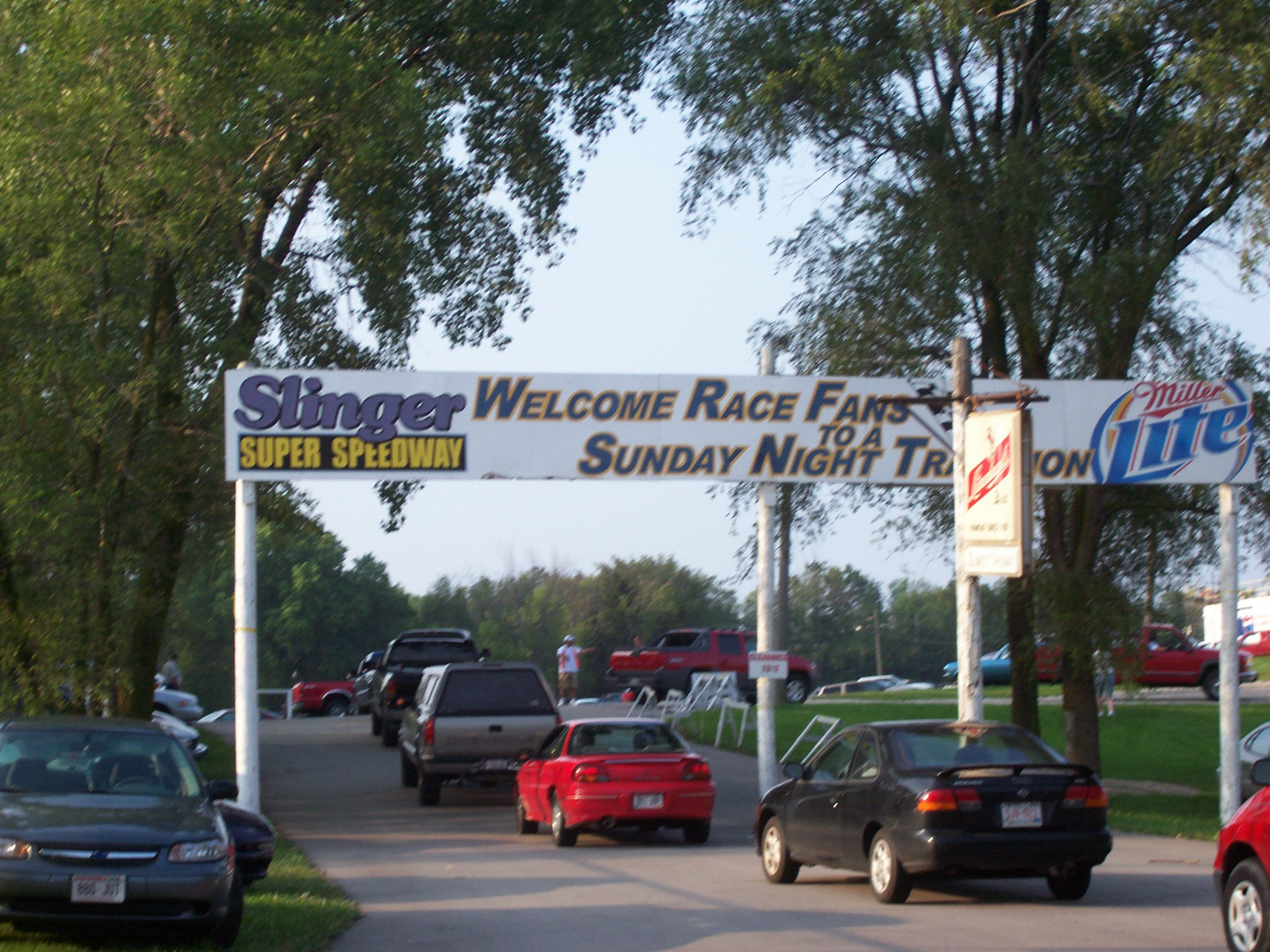
Entrance

Rich Bickle, Erik Darnell, Ryan Mathews (2001 Late Model Rookie of the Year), Robbie Reiser, Joe Shear, Lowell Bennett, Dick Trickle, Dave Watson and Scott Wimmer competed at Slinger before they moved to NASCAR. Several NASCAR Cup Series champions including, Dale Earnhardt, Rusty Wallace, Bobby Allison, Alan Kulwicki, Matt Kenseth, Kyle Busch, and Chase Elliott have competed at the track.

== Slinger Nationals ==
The track's biggest race of the year is the Slinger Nationals. The 200 lap super late model stock car race occurs in the middle of summer. The winner wins the Larry Detjens Memorial Trophy, which was named for the 1980 winner who died in a racing incident at another Wisconsin track later in the season. The 2026 Slinger Nationals will be the 47th running of this event.

The event is usually held on a Tuesday night in order for the nationally and regionally known drivers to participate in the Nationals. NASCAR stars frequently come to the circuit for a one time drive in a local car owner's car in the signature race. Non-local NASCAR drivers frequently race in the event. The 1987 event featured Davey Allison, his father Bobby Allison, Dale Earnhardt, Alan Kulwicki, Mark Martin, Ted Musgrave, and Butch Miller. Kenseth was already a Cup regular when he won his second Nationals in 2002. Three Roush Racing drivers, one from each of the three national series, raced in 2006. The 2007 event had ten drivers with experience in at least one of the three major NASCAR series: Matt Kenseth, Kyle Busch, Erik Darnell, Dick Trickle, Rich Bickle, Scott Wimmer, Chris Wimmer, Lowell Bennett, Kelly Bires, and Brad Mueller. Other notable drivers who have raced in the Slinger Nationals include Neil Bonnett, Harry Gant, Ernie Irvan, Dale Jarrett, Sterling Marlin, Kyle Petty, Rusty Wallace, Ken Schrader and Michael Waltrip. In 2021, by virtue of his win in the Nationals on Tuesday, Luke Fenhaus was granted an automatic invitation to compete in the SRX series race that Saturday as the series' "Local Ringer".

=== List of Slinger Nationals winners ===
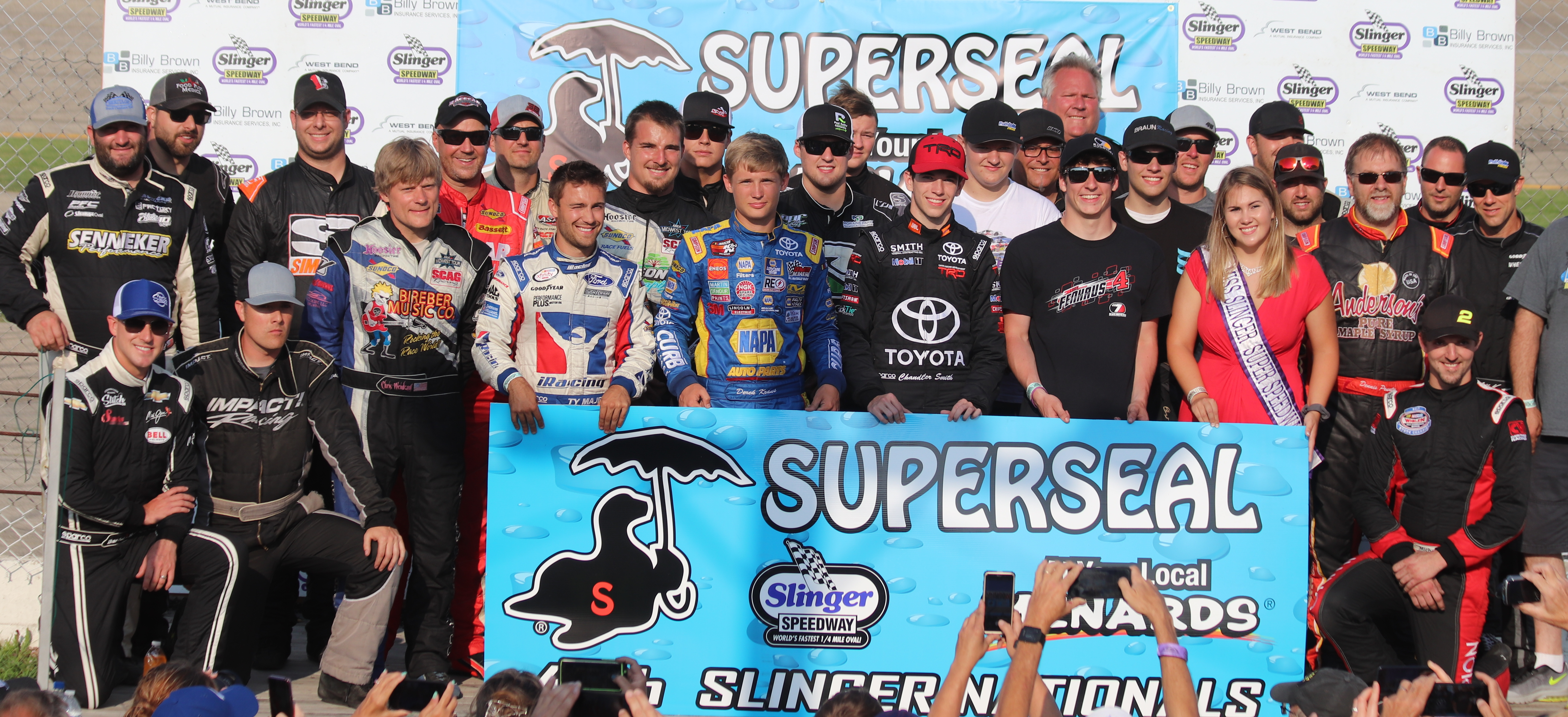
2019 Slinger Nationals field

- 1980 Larry Detjens
- 1981 Alan Kulwicki
- 1982 Dick Trickle
- 1983 Dick Trickle (2)
- 1984 Mark Martin
- 1985 Dick Trickle (3)
- 1986 John Ziegler
- 1987 Joe Shear
- 1988 Butch Miller
- 1989 Dick Trickle (4)
- 1990 Joe Shear (2)
- 1991 Joe Shear (3)
- 1992 Rich Bickle
- 1993 Joe Shear (4)
- 1994 Matt Kenseth
- 1995 Butch Miller (2)
- 1996 Rich Bickle (2)
- 1997 Lowell Bennett
- 1998 Tony Strupp
- 1999 Conrad Morgan
- 2000 Lowell Bennett (2)
- 2001 David Prunty
- 2002 Matt Kenseth (2)
- 2003 Rich Bickle (3)
- 2004 Lowell Bennett (3)
- 2005 Nathan Haseleu
- 2006 Matt Kenseth (3)
- 2007 Lowell Bennett (4)
- 2008 Matt Kenseth (4)
- 2009 Matt Kenseth (5)
- 2010 Lowell Bennett (5)
- 2011 Kyle Busch
- 2012 Matt Kenseth (6)
- 2013 Rich Bickle (4)
- 2014 Chris Wimmer
- 2015 Dennis Prunty
- 2016 Matt Kenseth (7)
- 2017 Bubba Pollard
- 2018 Ty Majeski
- 2019 Matt Kenseth (8)
- 2020 Ty Majeski (2)
- 2021 Luke Fenhaus
- 2022 William Byron
- 2023 Ty Majeski (3)
- 2024 Brad Mueller
- 2025 Ty Majeski (4)
- 2026 Casey Johnson

=== List of Slinger Nationals winners by driver ===
Driver	Total	Years won
Matt Kenseth	8	1994, 2002, 2006, 2008, 2009, 2012, 2016, 2019
Lowell Bennett	5	1997, 2000, 2004, 2007, 2010
Dick Trickle	4	1982, 1983, 1985, 1989
Joe Shear	4	1987, 1990, 1991, 1993
Rich Bickle	4	1992, 1996, 2003, 2013
Ty Majeski	4	2018, 2020, 2023, 2025
Butch Miller	2	1988, 1995
Larry Detjens	1	1980
Alan Kulwicki	1	1981
Mark Martin	1	1984
John Ziegler	1	1986
Tony Strupp	1	1998
Conrad Morgan	1	1999
David Prunty	1	2001
Nathan Haseleu	1	2005
Kyle Busch	1	2011
Chris Wimmer	1	2014
Dennis Prunty	1	2015
Bubba Pollard	1	2017
Luke Fenhaus	1	2021
William Byron	1	2022
