= Wisconsin International Raceway =

Racetrack

Wisconsin International Raceway (WIR)
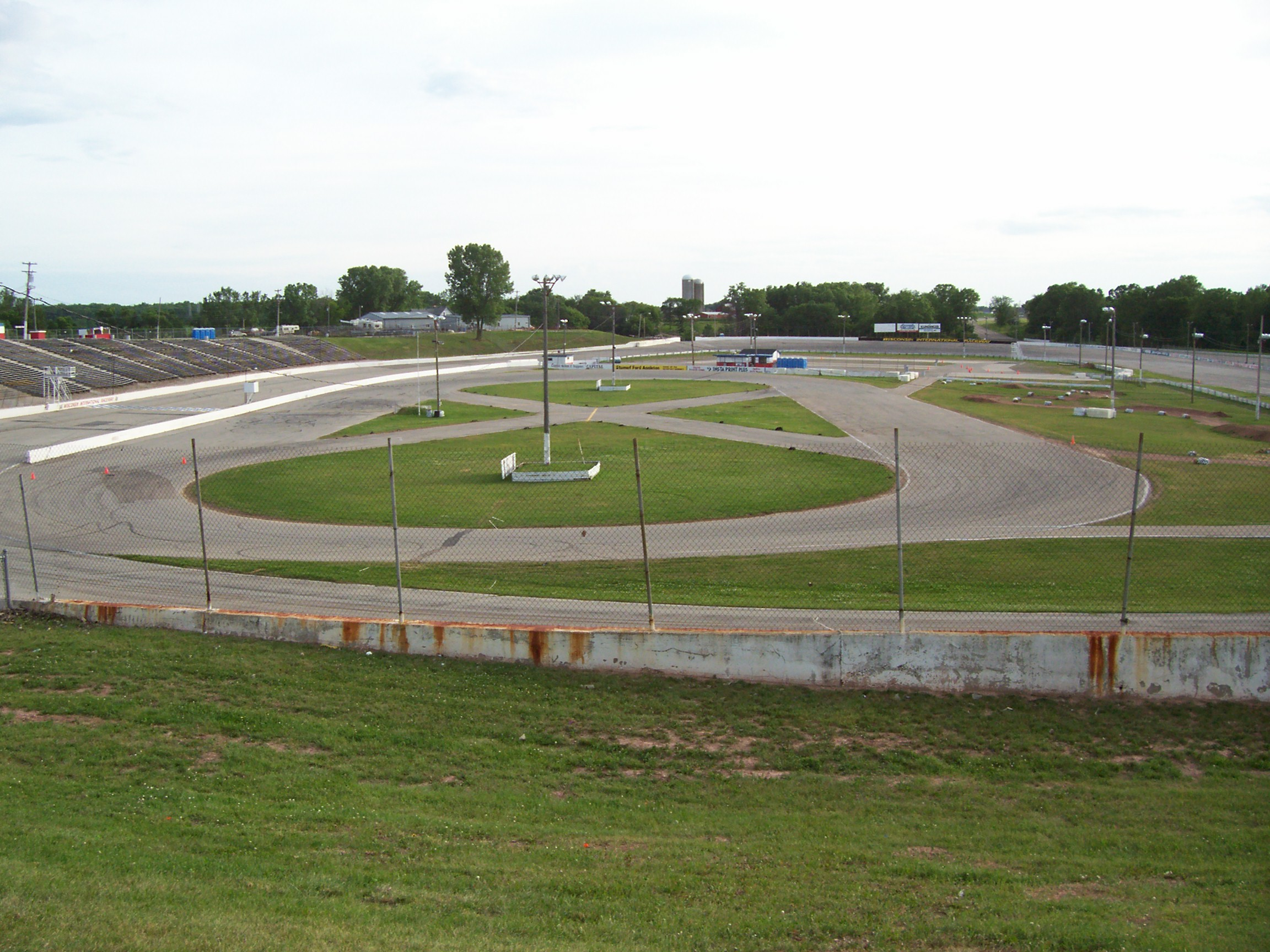
- 1/4 mile oval and Figure 8 tracks, plus most of the 1/2 mile oval
- Location: Kaukauna, Wisconsin (town of Buchanan)
- Coordinates: 44.2455°N 88.2603°W
- Opened: May 30, 1964; 62 years ago
- Major events: Dixieland 250; Red, White and Blue State Championship Series

1/2 mile
- Surface: asphalt
- Length: 0.50 mi (0.80 km)
- Turns: 4 plus dogleg on frontstretch
- Race lap record: 18.706 (Ty Majeski, 2021, Super late model)

1/4 mile
- Surface: asphalt
- Length: 0.40 km (0.25 mi)

Figure 8
- Surface: asphalt

Drag strip
- Surface: asphalt
- Banking: flat

The Wisconsin International Raceway (abbreviated WIR) is an asphalt stock car racing oval and dragstrip in the Town of Buchanan, in Outagamie County, just outside Kaukauna, Wisconsin, USA.

== History ==
Wisconsin International Raceway originally opened as KK Sports Arena, a nod to its location on County Trunk Highway KK, and opened its maiden season on May 30, 1964, with a single quarter-mile oval dirt track. A half mile D-shaped dirt track was inaugurated on August 1, 1965 with motorcycle races, by which time a figure-8 dirt track had been established inside the quarter-mile oval. Its paved drag strip opened on June 5, 1966. The half mile track was paved in 1968.

The name of the racing complex was changed to Wisconsin International Raceway on March 9, 1971.

== Oval track ==
There are seven divisions at the track. The Super Late Model and Late Model divisions race on the half-mile track. The Super Stocks, Sport 4's (stock four cylinders modified for racing), Quarter-mile Late Models, and Wisconsin Sport Trucks divisions race on the quarter-mile track. The Figure 8 cars end programs on the Figure 8 track inside of the quarter-mile. An automated timing and scoring system was set up for the 2007 season, and each race car carries a transponder.

The Wisconsin Sport Trucks series ran as the Mini Champs series at the track from 1988-1995. Due to insurance issues, they developed a new prototype body which became a truck, different from Mini Champs' open-wheel-style vehicle. 1996 was the inaugural year for the modern Wisconsin Sport Trucks series as we know it today at the track.

The Fox River Racing Club began helping promote the weekly events in 1975.

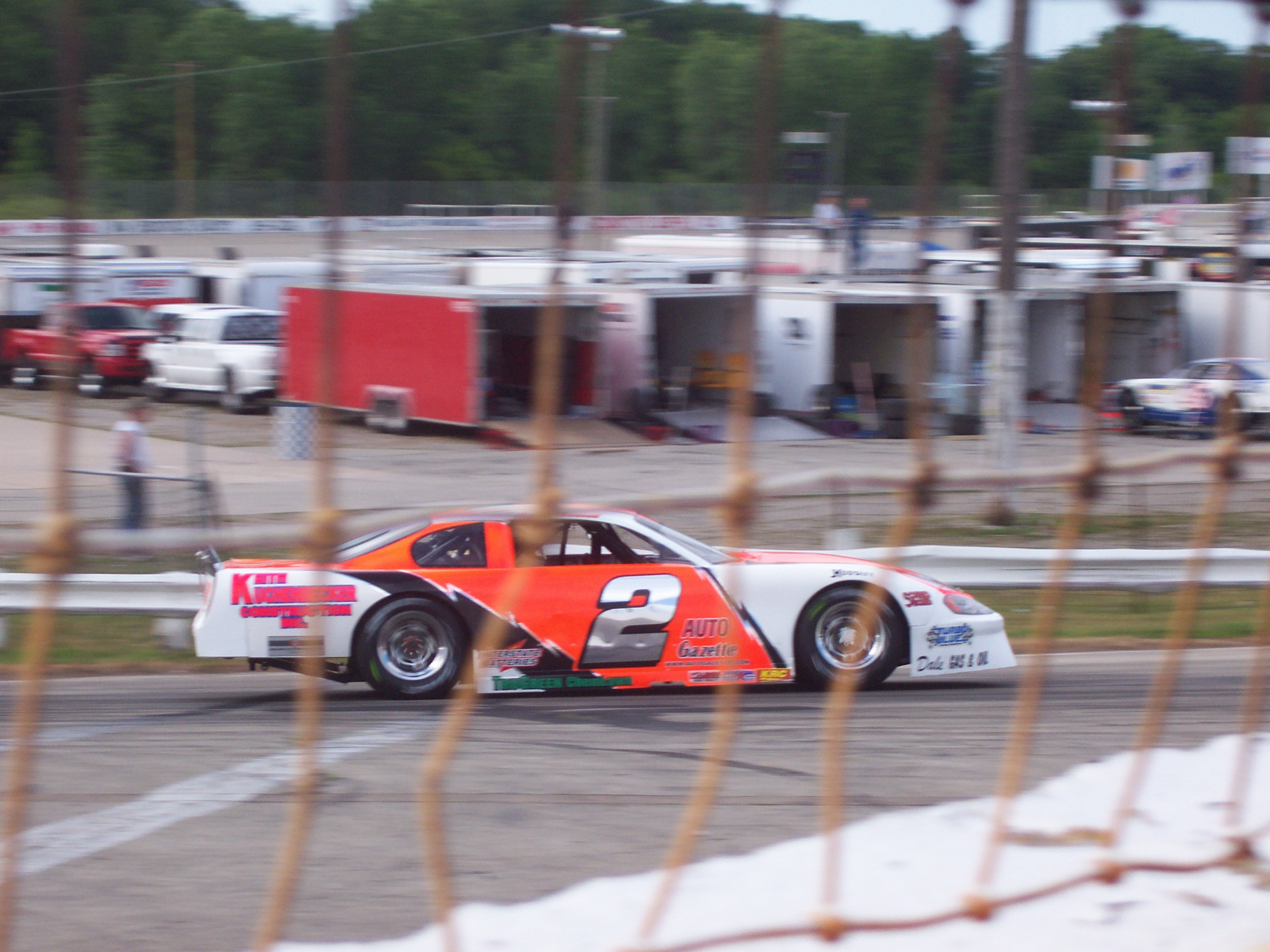
Super Late Model – Lowell Bennett

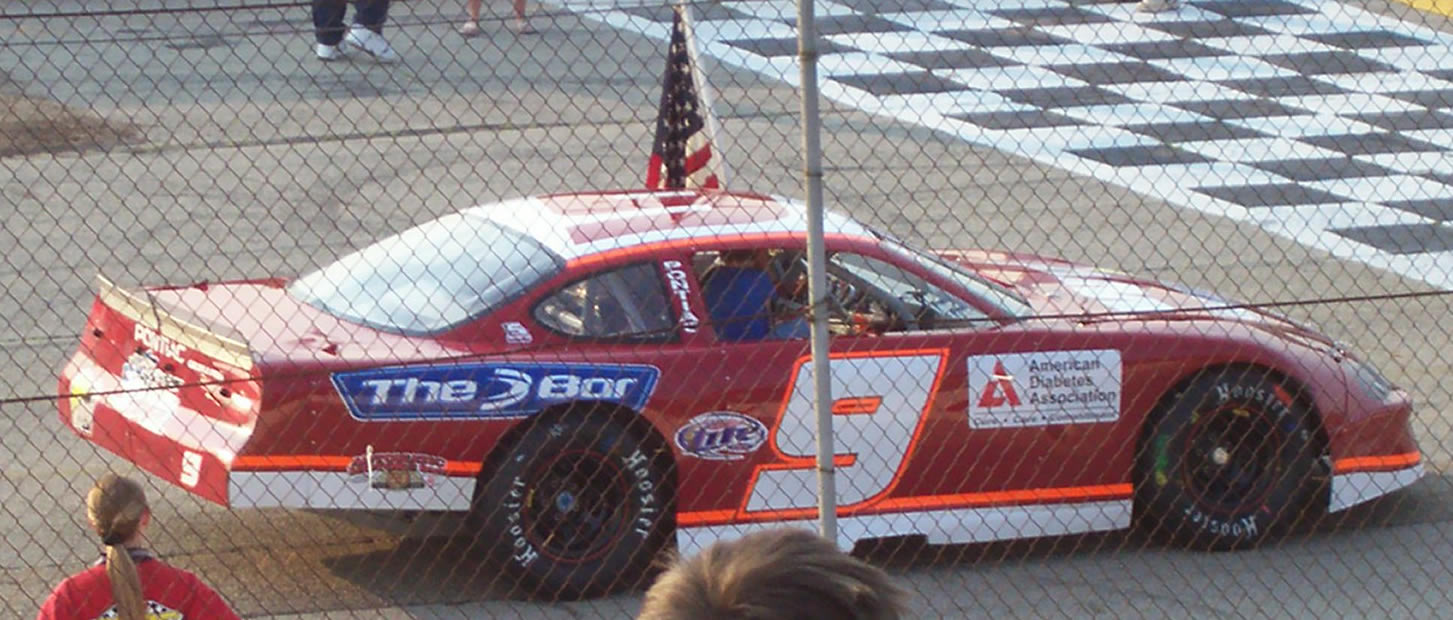
Late Model – Doug Mahlik

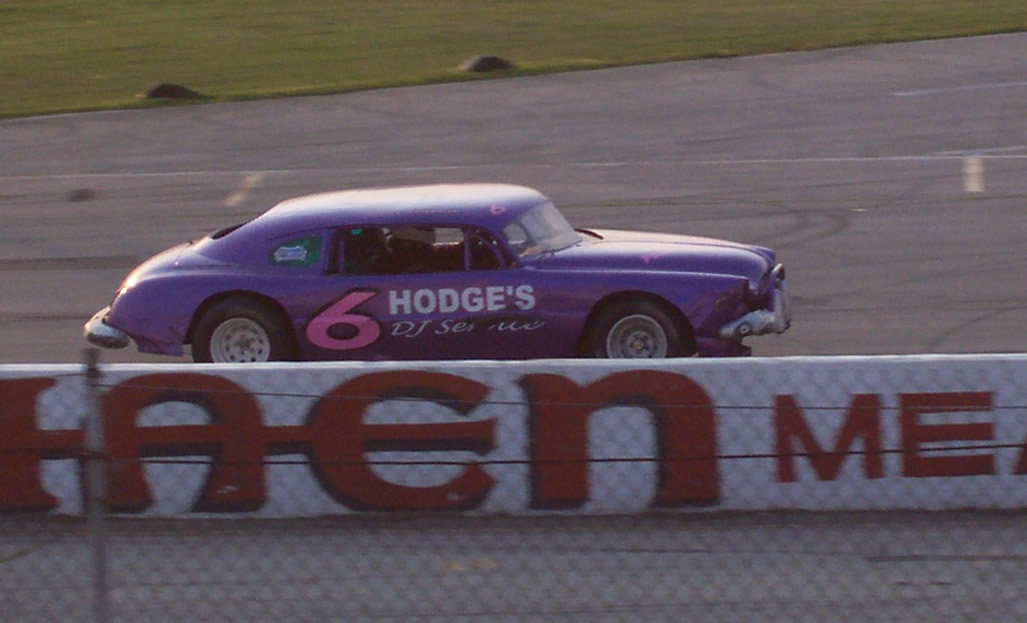
Super Stock

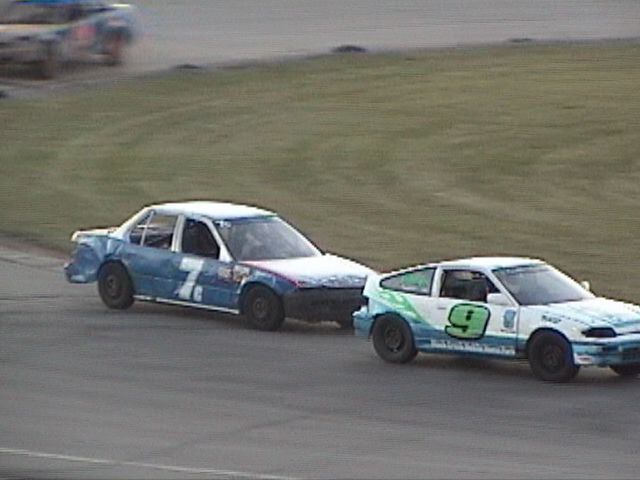
sizzlin 4's

Figure 8 cars

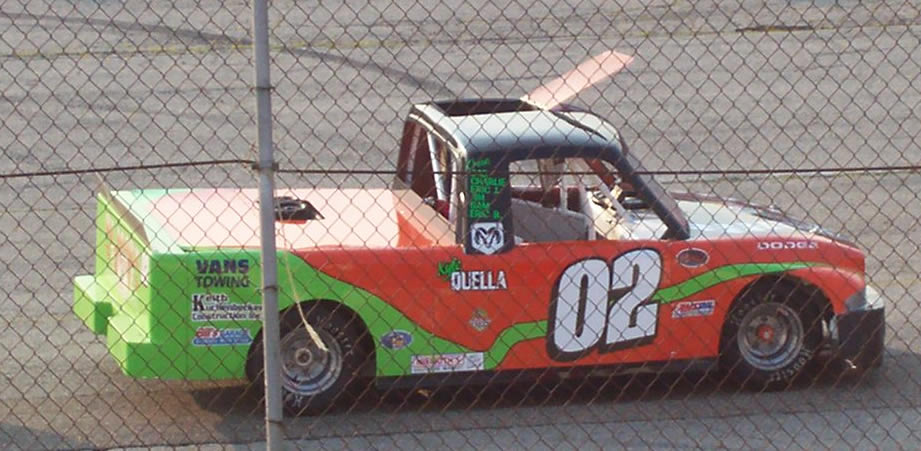
Wisconsin Sport Truck

=== Special events ===
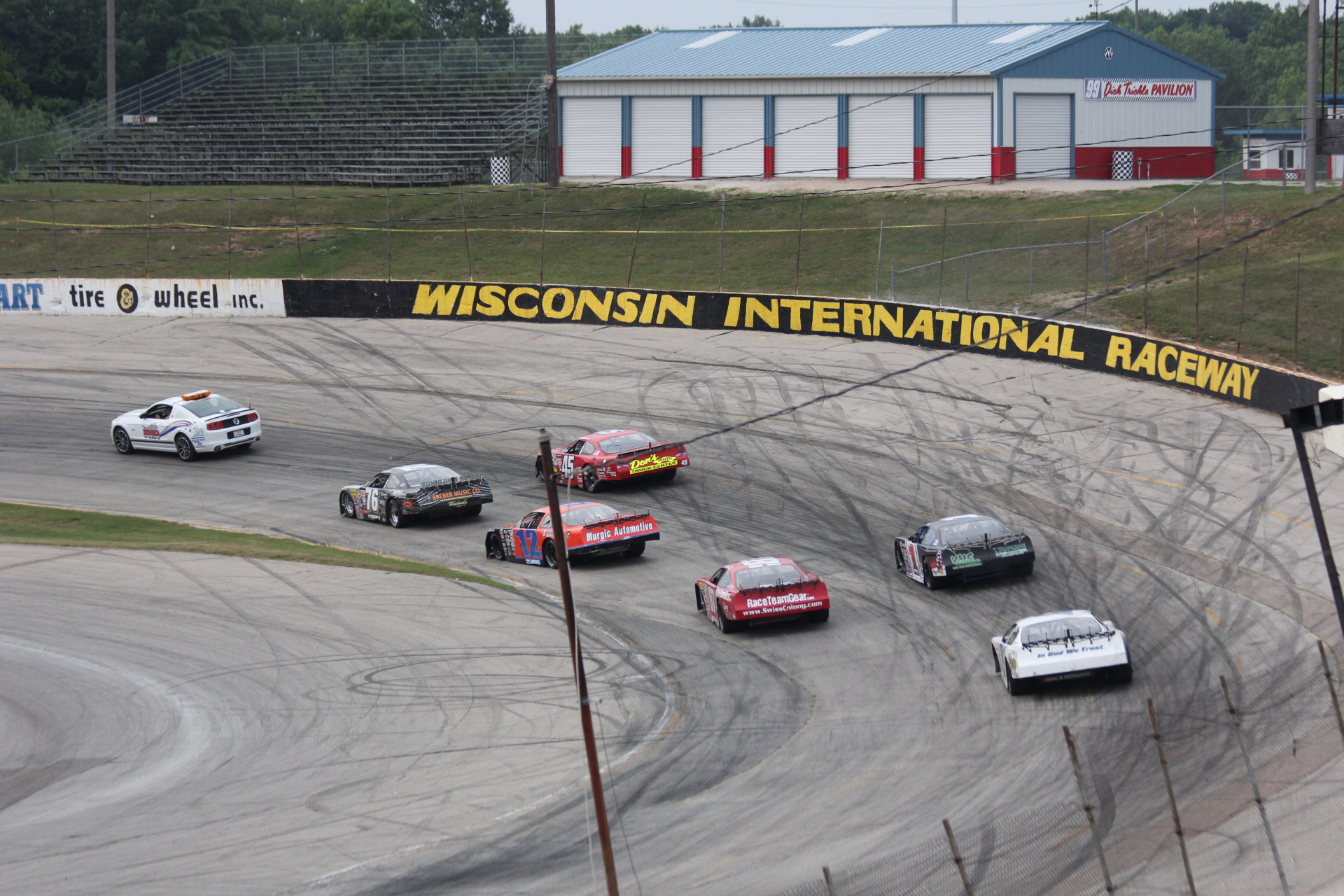
2014 ARCA Midwest Tour race

The track had an annual American Speed Association event when the sanctioning body was in existence. The track resumed hosting ASA events after the series was reorganized, and it held an event in 2007 for the ASA Midwest Tour. That event, the Dixieland 250, is now part of the ARCA Midwest Tour schedule and is one of the most prestigious events on the calendar, attracting NASCAR champions Kevin Harvick and Ron Hornaday Jr. in 2009 and Kyle Busch in 2017. The race was part of the NASCAR Midwest Series between 1998 and 2004 and had 13 races under NASCAR banner. Earlier the USAC Stock Car series had raced at the track.

The track has hosted an annual Red, White, and Blue State Championship Series for super late models since 1972. The series consist of three races in June (red), July (white), and August (blue). The series changed from Saturday nights to Thursday nights to combine with the weekly series in 2009. The series was part of the Midwest Challenge Series (formerly ARTGO) and later part of the Wisconsin Challenge Series. 7,832 people watched Dick Trickle win the first red race.

ASA National Tour ran a race at the facility in 2002. The race was won by Kevin Cywinski.

=== Notable drivers ===
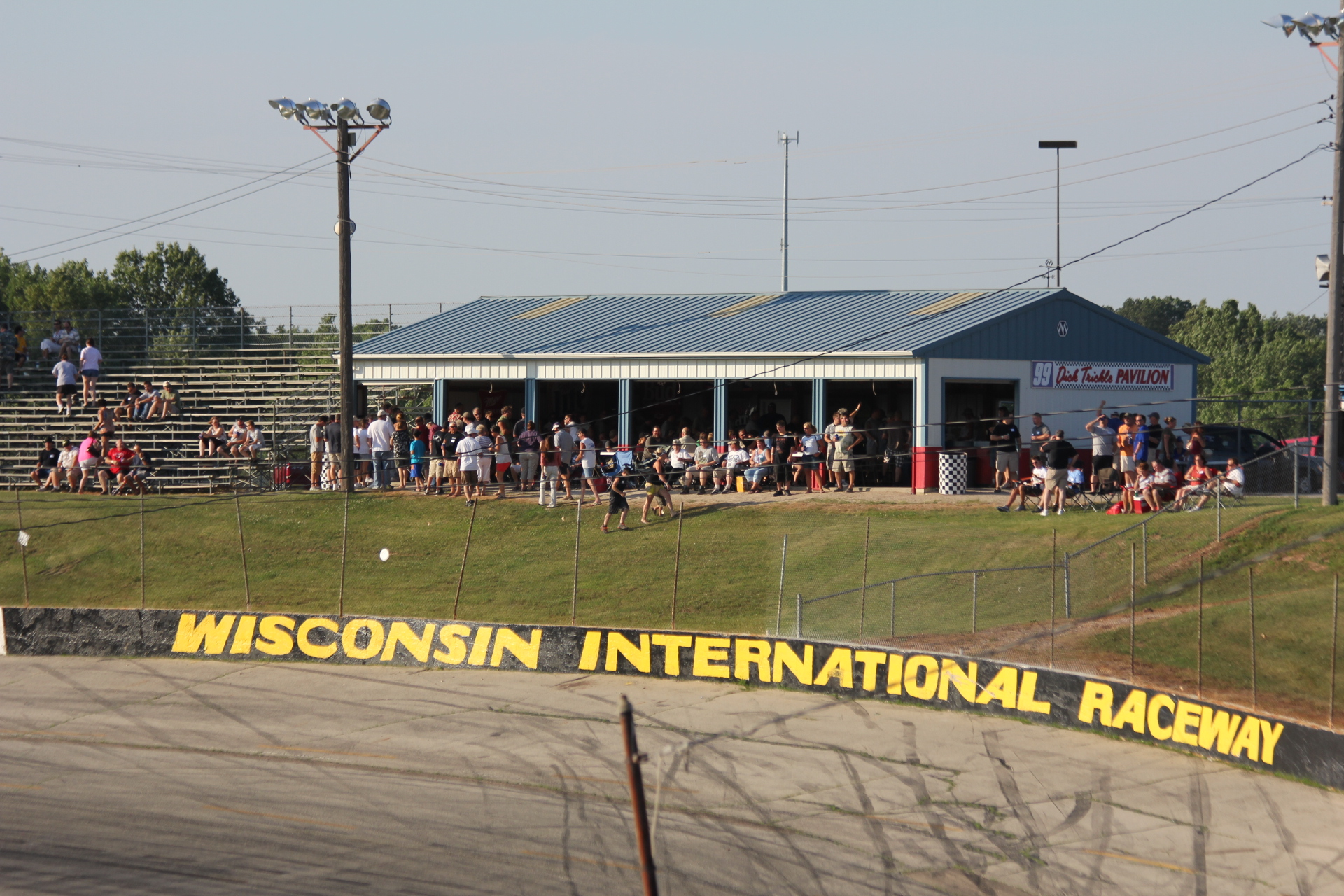
Dick Trickle pavilion in Turn 2

All drivers listed later competed in NASCAR nationally-sanctioned events

- Lowell Bennett (1991, 1998 and 2012 track champion, 1999, 2004, 2009, and 2010, 2012. Five Red, White & Blue championships )
- Rich Bickle
- Scott Hansen (1985–89 track champion)
- Matt Kenseth (1994 and 1995 track champion)
- Todd Kluever
- Alan Kulwicki (1979 and 1980 track champion)
- Ty Majeski
- Dave Marcis
- Mark Martin (Red, White, and Blue champion)
- Ted Musgrave
- Robbie Reiser
- Jim Sauter (1981 track champion)
- Tim Sauter
- Johnny Sauter
- Jason Schuler
- Dick Trickle (seven Red, White, and Blue championships)
- Dave Watson (two Red, White, and Blue championships)

Trickle carved enough of a legacy that the track dedicated the Dick Trickle Pavilion in Turn 2. Joe Shear won the Red, White, and Blue series 1979, 1987, and 1988.

=== Track champions ===
Year	Super late model	Super Stock	Sizzlin' 4s	Figure 8	Mini Champs & Wisconsin Sport Trucks
1975	Rich Somers				
1976	Larry Schuler				
1977	Jerry "Medina" Smith			Kenny Van Wychen	
1978	Rich Somers			Rick Zieler	
1979	Alan Kulwicki	Pete Berken		Tom Munes	
1980	Alan Kulwicki	Pete Berken		Tom Munes	
1981	Jim Sauter			Randy Rahn	
1982	Terry Baldry			Dave Uttecht	
1983	Terry Baldry			Randy Rahn	
1984	Terry Baldry			Randy Rahn	
1985	Scott Hansen			Dan Gracyalny	
1986	Scott Hansen			Jeff Beschta	
1987	Scott Hansen			Dan Gracyalny	
1988	Scott Hansen			Dan Gracyalny	Jeff Korinek
1989	Scott Hansen			Terry Van Roy	Bill Daul
1990	J. J. Smith	Terry Van Roy		Dan Gracyalny	Bill Daul
1991	Lowell Bennett	Terry Van Roy		Dan Gracyalny	Jeff Korinek
1992	Jim Weber	Terry Van Roy		Terry Van Roy	Mike Springstroh
1993	Terry Baldry	Terry Van Roy		Rick Kaufert	Mike Springstroh
1994	Matt Kenseth	Terry Van Roy		Terry Van Roy	Hank Calmes
1995	Matt Kenseth	Chris LaRocque		Terry Van Roy	Andy Geiger
1996	Mark Schroeder	Chris LaRocque		Dan Gracyalny	Andy Geiger
1997	Terry Baldry	Mike Rahn		Terry Van Roy	Mike Schneider
1998	Lowell Bennett	Randy Van Roy		Dan Gracyalny	Mike Schneider
1999	Terry Baldry	Terry Van Roy		Randy Thiemer	Andy Geiger
2000	Terry Baldry	Chris LaRocque		Terry Van Roy	Robyn Wussow
2001	Terry Baldry	Terry Van Roy		Terry Van Roy	Robyn Wussow
2002	Terry Baldry	Terry Van Roy		Terry Van Roy	Hank Calmes
2003	Terry Baldry	Andy Casavant	Craig VandeWettering	Jeff Beschta	Dan Hansen
2004	Terry Baldry	Andy Casavant	Bryan Monday	Terry Van Roy	Jason Van Handel
2005	Rod Wheeler	Andy Casavant	Phil Verboomen	Donald Van Camp	Todd Schuette
2006	Tim Rothe	Randy Van Roy	Nick Boldt	Donald Van Camp	Dan Vixmer
2007	Tim Rothe	Greg Hauser	Scott Verboomen	Terry Van Roy	Dan Vixmer
2008	Jeff Van Oudenhoven	Greg Hauser; Andy Casavant	Tom Schweitzer	Jeff Wohlrabe	Ron Magdanz
2009	Jeff Van Oudenhoven	Todd Bauman	Tim Richter	Terry Van Roy	Ron Magdanz
2010	Terry Baldry	Greg Hauser; Andy Casavant	Wayne Sonkowsky	Dan Gracyalny	Jason Plutz
2011	Jeff Van Oudenhoven	Greg Hauser; Andy Casavant	Cody Kippenhan	Dan Gracyanly	John Roeser
2012	Lowell Bennett	Dylan Wenzel	Cory Romenesko	Craig VandeWettering	Bryan Monday
2013	Jeff Van Oudenhoven	Dylan Wenzel	Ethan Beattie	Jared Baughman	Brett Van Horn
2014	Lowell Bennett	Greg Hauser	Wayne Sonkowsky	Craig VandeWettering	Brett Van Horn
2015	Lowell Bennett	Schwalback/Van Roy	Mike Klein	Craig VandeWettering	Brett Van Horn
2016	Jeff Van Oudenhoven	Dyaln Wenzel	Mike Klein	Craig VandeWettering	Brett Van Horn
2017	Andy Monday	Dylan Wenzel	Dan Thomson	Craig VandeWettering; Terry Van Roy	Kyle Quella
2018	Casey Johnson	Rachel Meyerhofer	Andy Miller	Craig VandeWettering	Jason Plutz
2019	Casey Johnson	Wayne Sonkowsky; Greg Hauser	Emery Beattie; Evan Beattie	Mike Meyerhofer Jr	Kyle Quella
2020	Bobby Kendall	Shane Krueger	Scott Wolf	Nick Osberg	Cody Vanderloop
2021	Maxwell Schultz	Mitch Meyerhofer; Josh Mueller	Emery Beattie; Ethan Beattie	Terry Van Roy	Bobby Wautier
2022	Dalton Zehr	Mitch Meyerhofer; Josh Mueller	Justin Fickel	Russ Lorbiecki	Bobby Wautier
2023	Sawyer Effertz	George Schwalbach	Mitchel Opsahl	Mike Meyerhofer Jr.	Jason Van Handel
2024	Chad Butz	Mike King	Gavin Klein	Jordan Gracyalny	Kyle Quella
2025	Grant Griesbach	Dylan Wenzel	Jeremy Czarapata	Craig VandeWettering Dan Gracyalny	Brady Vanderloop
2026	Riley Stenjem	Josh Mueller	Jordan Fickel; Justin Fickel	Craig VandeWettering Matthew Bauer	Mason Calmes

== Dragstrip ==
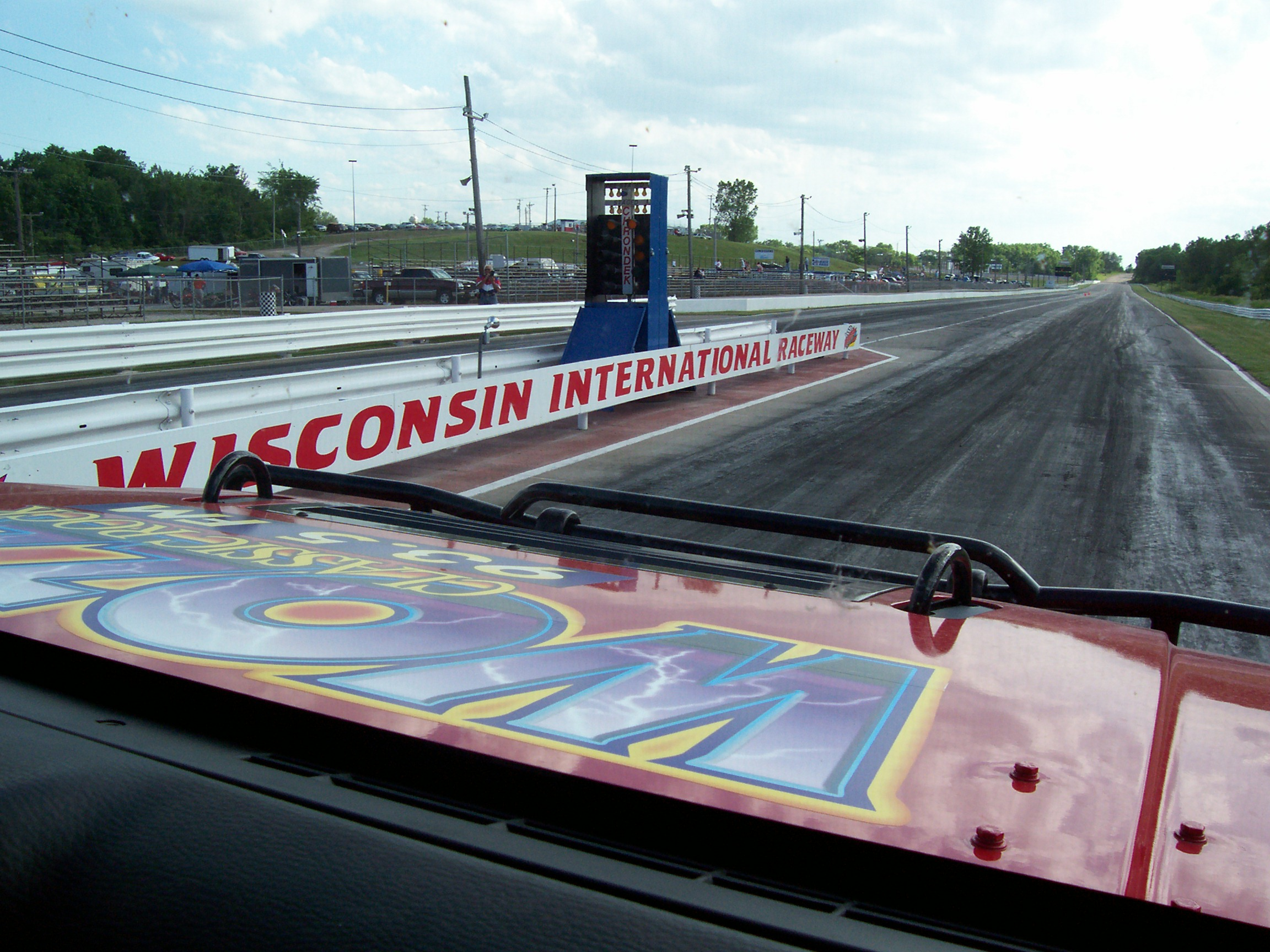
Looking down the drag strip

The dragstrip is a 1/4 mile paved track. It is one of three operating dragstrips in Wisconsin.

=== Weekly divisions ===
There are six weekly divisions that compete on Saturday nights: Top Eliminator Class, Hot Rod Eliminator, Street Eliminator, Pro-Bike and Snowmobile, Street Bike, and Junior Dragsters.

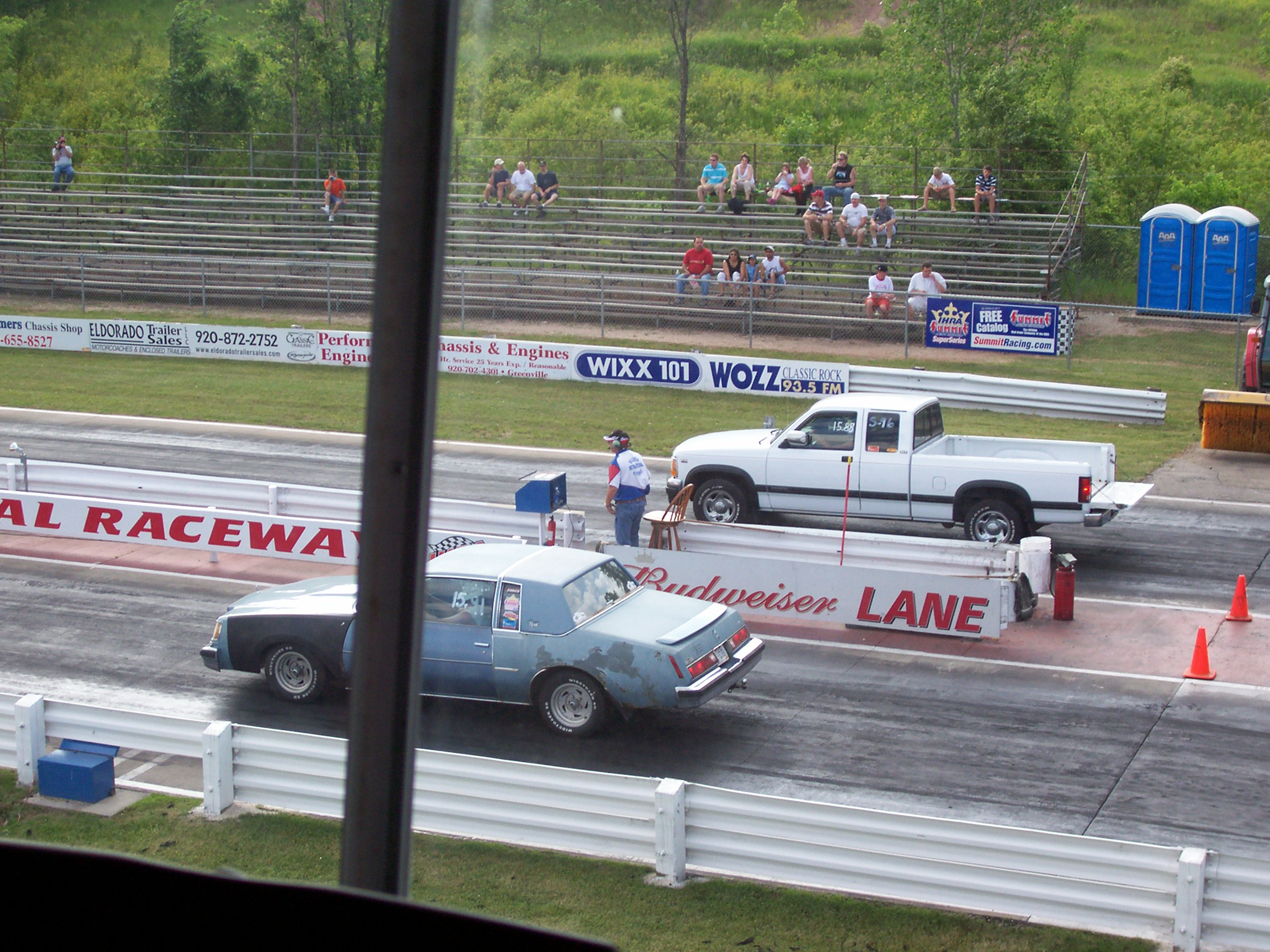
Street Eliminators

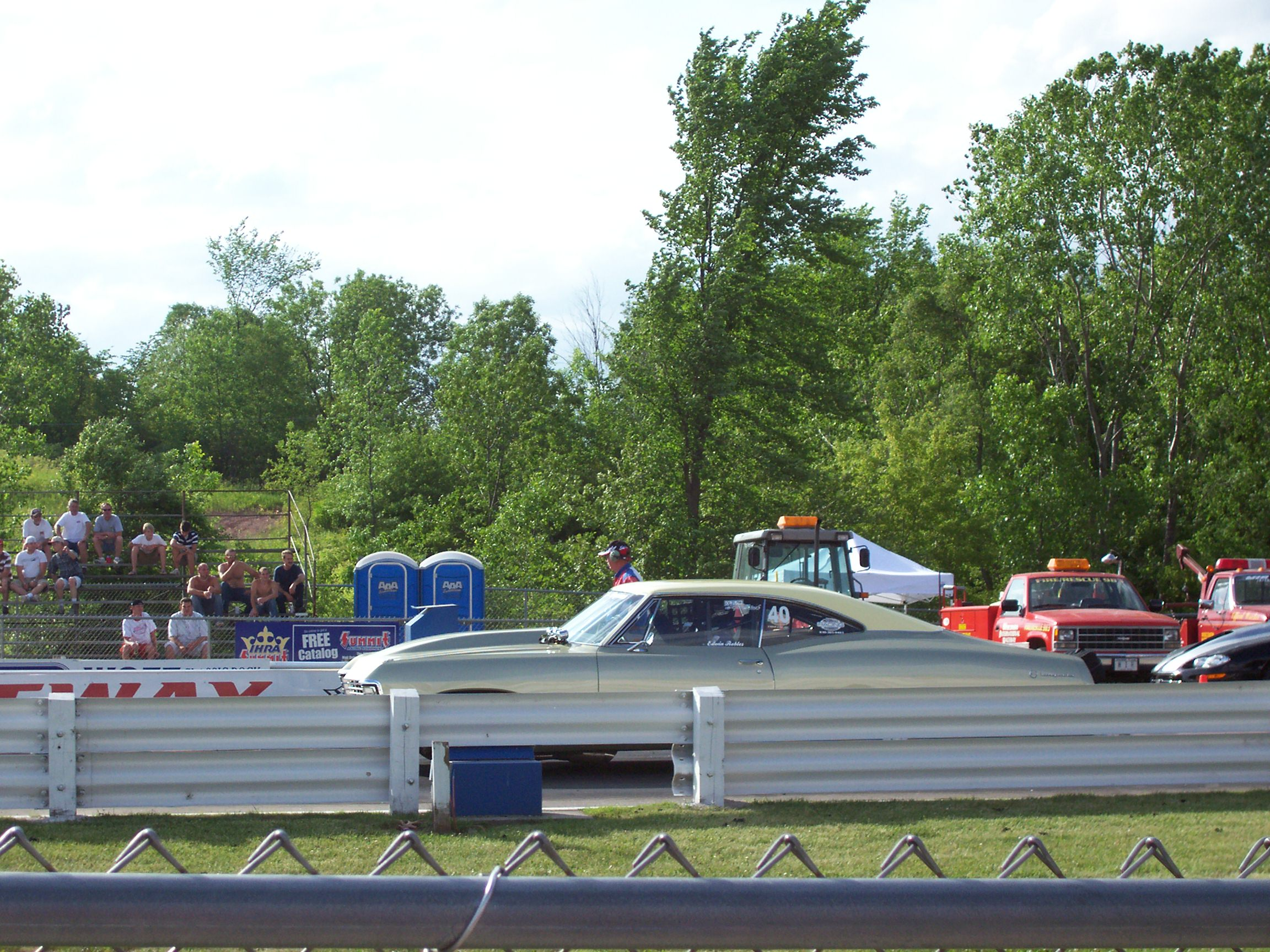
Hot Rod Eliminators

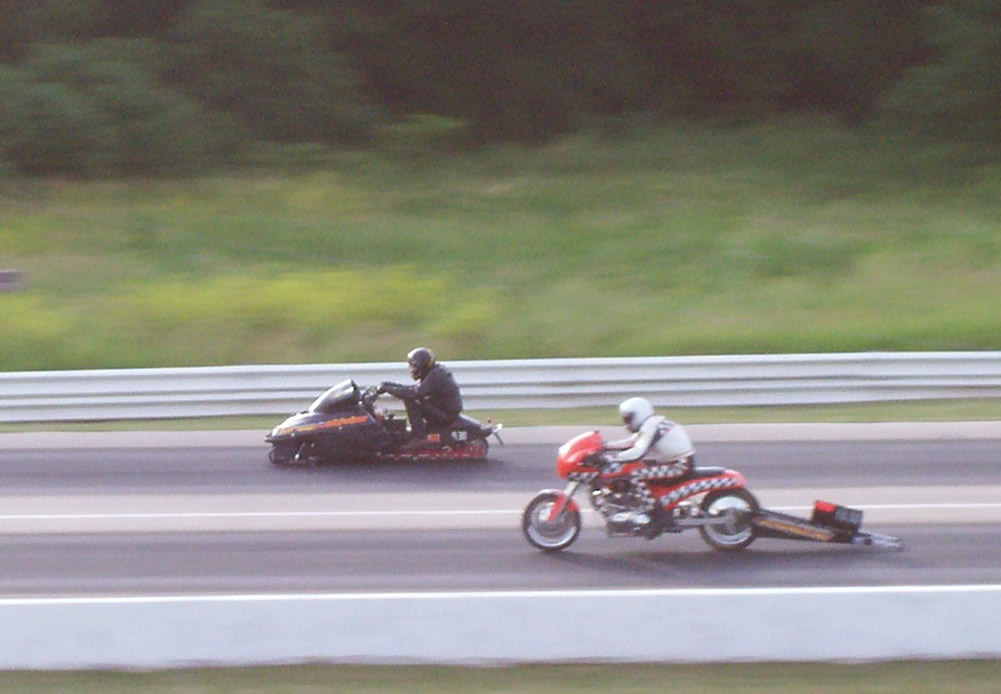
Snowmobile vs. Pro-Bike

== Eve of Destruction ==
The track has hosted an annual "Eve of Destruction" each September since 1993 and it is the track's annual season finale for the oval track. The Eve of Destruction is one of the biggest events hosted at track, as the 10,000 seat raceway is generally packed. Drivers compete in a variety of unusual events such as chain races (two cars are chained together), spin to win (race backwards and then spin around forward for the finish), trailer races (part of the trailer must remain intact to continue racing), etc. In between races, fans are entertained by stunt car drivers. Ten school buses compete in a survival-of-the-fittest competition, where the last bus standing wins. Track owner Roger Van Daalwyk described the Eve of Destruction: "We kind of wreck everything." During the 2017 Eve of Destruction, a local driver died from injuries sustained in a figure-eight race.

== Media ==
Figure 8 racing
Figure 8 racing at Wisconsin International Raceway — 3.3 MB
